= Judo at the 2000 Summer Olympics – Qualification =

Qualification for judo at the Games of the XXVII Olympiad

Qualification for Judo at the 2000 Summer Olympics was based on the IJF 1999 World Judo Championships in June 1999. The top 8 men and women from each division qualify, subject to a limit of 1 judoka per National Olympic Committee ("NOC") per division. Further continental quotas (Europe 98, Africa 35, Pan-America 63, Asia 56 and Oceania 14 across both sexes and all divisions) also qualify subject to an overall limit of 1 judoka per NOC. The qualification is allocated to the athlete.

== Qualification timeline ==
List of tournaments
Africa
Event	Date	Venue	Even Ref.
1998 African Judo Championships	July 23–26, 1998	(Senegal) Dakar	
1999 Kano Cup	10 January 9–10, 1999	(Japan) Tokyo	
1999 Women's International Tournament	10 January 9–10, 1999	(Japan) Fukuoka	
1999 International Tournament	February 11–14, 1999	(France) Paris	
1999 International Tournament	February 20–21, 1999	(Austria) Leonding	
1999 International Tournament	February 27–28, 1999	(Germany) München	
1999 International Tournament	March 27–28, 1999	(Italy) Rome	
1999 International Tournament	March 26–28, 1999	(Tunisia) Tunis	
1999 International Tournament	April 3–5, 1999	(Cameroon) Yaoundé	
1999 International Tournament	May 13–16, 1999	(Madagascar) Tananarive	
1999 International Tournament	May 22–24, 1999	Mauritius	
1999 International Tournament	June 12–13, 1999	(Ivory Coast) Abidjan	
1999 All-Africa Games	September 11–14, 1999	(South Africa) Johannesburg	
1999 Sungkop Tournament	December 20–21, 1999	(South Korea) Seoul	
1999 Women's International Tournament	December 11–12, 1999	(Japan) Fukuoka	
2000 International Tournament	February 19–20, 2000	(Austria) Leonding	
2000 International Tournament	March 24–26, 2000	(Tunisia) Tunis	
2000 International Tournament	April, 2000	(Cameroon) Yaoundé	
2000 International Tournament	May, 2000	(Madagascar) Tananarive	
2000 International Tournament	May, 2000	Mauritius	
2000 International Tournament	June, 2000	(Ivory Coast) Abidjan	
2000 African Judo Championships	May 9–12, 2000	(Algeria) Algiers	
Asia
Event	Date	Venue	Even Ref.
1998 Asian Games	December 7–10, 1998	(Thailand) Bangkok	
1999 Kano Cup	10 January 9–10, 1999	(Japan) Tokyo	
1999 Women's International Tournament	10 January 9–10, 1999	(Japan) Fukuoka	
1999 International Tournament	January 23–24, 1999	(Russia) Moscow	
1999 International Tournament	February 11–14, 1999	(France) Paris	
1999 International Tournament	February 20–21, 1999	(Austria) Leonding	
1999 International Tournament	February 27–28, 1999	(Germany) München	
1999 International Tournament	March 6–7, 1999	(Hungary) Budapest	
1999 Pacific Rim Judo Championships	July 17–18, 1999	(Taiwan) Taoyuan	
1999 Asian Judo Championships	June 25–26, 1999	(China) Wenzhou	
1999 World Judo Championships	October 7–10, 1999	(United Kingdom) Birmingham	
1999 Sungkop Tournament	December 20–21, 1999	(South Korea) Seoul	
1999 Women's International Tournament	December 11–12, 1999	(Japan) Fukuoka	
2000 Matsutaro Shoriki Cup Tokyo	January, 2000	(Japan) Tokyo	
2000 International Tournament	January 22–23, 2000	(Russia) Moscow	
2000 International Tournament	February 12–13, 2000	(France) Paris	
2000 International Tournament	February 19–20, 2000	(Austria) Leonding	
2000 International Tournament	February 26–27, 2000	(Germany) München	
2000 International Tournament	March 3–5, 2000	(Hungary) Budapest	
2000 Asian Judo Championships	May 26–28, 2000	(Japan) Osaka	
Europe
Event	Date	Venue	Even Ref.
1999 World Judo Championships	October 7–10, 1999	(United Kingdom) Birmingham	
2000 International Tournament	January 22–23, 2000	(Russia) Moscow	
2000 International Tournament	February 5–6, 2000	(Bulgaria) Sofia	
2000 International Tournament	February 12–13, 2000	(France) Paris	
2000 International Tournament	February 19–20, 2000	(Austria) Leonding	
2000 International Tournament	February 26–27, 2000	(Germany) München	
2000 International Tournament	March 3–5, 2000	(Hungary) Budapest	
2000 International Tournament	March 11–12, 2000	(Czech Republic) Prague	
2000 International Tournament	March 18–19, 2000	(Poland) Warsaw	
2000 International Tournament	March 25–26, 2000	(Italy) Rome	
2000 International Tournament	March 31, - April 2, 2000	(Netherlands) Rotterdam	
2000 European Judo Championships	May 18–21, 2000	(Poland) Wroclaw	
Oceania
Event	Date	Venue	Even Ref.
1999 World Judo Championships	October 7–10, 1999	(United Kingdom) Birmingham	
1999 USA Invitational Open	October 22–23, 1999	(United States) Colorado Springs	
2000 Oceania Judo Championships	March 11–13, 2000	(Australia) Sydney	
Pan America
Event	Date	Venue	Even Ref.
1997 Pan American Judo Championships	August 29, 1997	(Mexico) Guadalajara	
1997 World Judo Championships	October 9–12, 1997	(France) Paris	
1997 Central American Games (Note: Belize, Costa Rica, El Salvador, Guatemala, Honduras, Nicaragua, Panama)	December 5–15, 1997	(Honduras) San Pedro Sula	
1998 Central American and Caribbean Games (Note: Aruba, Bahamas, Barbados, Bermuda, British Virgin Islands, Cayman Islands, Cuba, Dominica, Dominican Republic, Grenada, Haiti, Jamaica, Mexico, Netherlands Antilles, Puerto Rico, Saint Lucia, St. Vincent & the Grenadines, Trinidad and Tobago, Virgin Islands)	August 18–21, 1998	(Venezuela) Maracaibo	
1998 South American Games (Note: Argentina, Bolivia, Brazil, Chile, Colombia, Ecuador, Guyana, Paraguay, Peru, Suriname, Uruguay, Venezuela)	October 28–31, 1998	(Ecuador) Cuenca	
1998 Pan American Judo Championships	November 29–30, 1998	(Dominican Republic) Santo Domingo	
1999 Pan American Games	August 2–5, 1999	(Canada) Winnipeg	
1999 World Judo Championships	October 7–10, 1999	(United Kingdom) Birmingham	
1999 Pan American Judo Championships	November 12, 1999	(Uruguay) Montevideo	
Tournament (Note: Canada, USA)			

== Men's events ==
=== Extra-lightweight (60 kg) ===
Qualification method		Places	Rank	NOC	Qualified judoka	Ranking points	Qualified* (not highest ranked in NOC)
World Championship		8	1	Cuba	Manolo Poulot		
World Championship		8	2	Japan	Kazuhiko Tokuno		
World Championship		8	3	Belarus	Natig Bahirov		
World Championship		8	4	Georgia	Nestor Khergiani		
World Championship		8	5	Great Britain	John Buchanan		
World Championship		8	6	Mongolia	Dorjpalamyn Narmandakh		
World Championship		8	7	Armenia	Vardan Voskanyan		
World Championship		8	8	Russia	Evguani Stanev		
Continental quota	Africa	3	1	TUN	Makrem Ayed		
Continental quota	Africa	3	2	MAR	Abdelouahed Idrissi Chorfi		
Continental quota	Africa	3	3	ALG	Omar Rebahi		
Continental quota	Asia	5	1	KGZ	Aidyn Smagulov		
Continental quota	Asia	5	2	KOR	Jung Bu-kyung		
Continental quota	Asia	5	3	CHN	Jia Yunbing		
Continental quota	Asia	5	4	UZB	Alisher Mukhtarov		
Continental quota	Asia	5	5	KAZ	Bazarbek Donbay		Nurbolo SULEYMENOV
Continental quota	Europe	9	1	Azerbaijan	Elchin Ismayilov	150	
Continental quota	Europe	9	2	Spain	Óscar Peñas	120	
Continental quota	Europe	9	3	France	Eric Despezelle	120	
Continental quota	Europe	9	4	Belgium	Cédric Taymans	80	
Continental quota	Europe	9	5	Germany	Oliver Gussenberg	80	
Continental quota	Europe	9	6	Slovakia	Marek Matuszek	80	
Continental quota	Europe	9	7	Moldova	Giorgi Kurdgelashvili	60	
Continental quota	Europe	9	8	Switzerland	David Moret	60	
Continental quota	Europe	9	9	Ukraine	Ruslan Mirzaliyev	41	
Continental quota	Oceania	1	1	New Zealand	Brendon Crooks	9	
Continental quota	America	6	1	BRA	Denílson Lourenço		
Continental quota	America	6	2	ARG	Jorge Lencina		
Continental quota	America	6	3	DOM	Juan Carlos Jacinto		
Continental quota	America	6	4	USA	Brandan Greczkowski		
Continental quota	America	6	5	VEN	Reiver Alvarenga		
Continental quota	America	6	6	ECU	Juan Barahona		
Invitations	Host nation	1	—	Australia	Adrian Robertson		
Invitations	I.O.C./.I.J.F./ ANOC						

=== Half-lightweight (66 kg) ===
Qualification method		Places	Rank	NOC	Qualified judoka	Ranking points	Qualified* (not highest ranked in NOC)
World Championship		8	1	France	Larbi Benboudaoud		
World Championship		8	2	Turkey	Hüseyin Özkan		
World Championship		8	3	Netherlands	Patrick van Kalken		
World Championship		8	4	Cuba	Yordanis Arencibia		
World Championship		8	5	Venezuela	Ludwig Ortíz		
World Championship		8	6	South Korea	Han Ji-hwan		
World Championship		8	7	Spain	Kiyoshi Uematsu		
World Championship		8	8	Mongolia	Pürevdorjiin Nyamlkhagva		
Continental quota	Africa	3	1	ALG	Amar Meridja		
Continental quota	Africa	3	2	CMR	Jean Claude Cameroun		
Continental quota	Africa	3	3	TUN	Anis Lounifi		
Continental quota	Asia	5	1	JPN	Yukimasa Nakamura		
Continental quota	Asia	5	2	UZB	Mansur Zhumayev		
Continental quota	Asia	5	3	IRI	Arash Miresmaeili		
Continental quota	Asia	5	4	CHN	Zhang Guangjun		
Continental quota	Asia	5	5	KAZ	Ivan Baglayev		
Continental quota	Europe	9	1	Russia	Islam Matsiev	150	
Continental quota	Europe	9	2	Georgia	Giorgi Vazagashvili	85	
Continental quota	Europe	9	3	Hungary	József Csák	80	
Continental quota	Europe	9	4	Italy	Girolamo Giovinazzo	80	
Continental quota	Europe	9	5	Moldova	Victor Bivol	70	
Continental quota	Europe	9	6	Bulgaria	Georgi Georgiev	65	
Continental quota	Europe	9	7	Great Britain	David Somerville	60	
Continental quota	Europe	9	8	Sweden	Gabriel Bengtsson	58	
Continental quota	Europe	9	9	Portugal	Pedro Caravana	46	
Continental quota	Oceania	1	1				
Continental quota	America	6	1	ARG	Martín Ríos		
Continental quota	America	6	2	USA	Alex Ottiano		
Continental quota	America	6	3	BRA	Henrique Guimaraes		
Continental quota	America	6	4	PUR	Melvin Méndez		
Continental quota	America	6	5	ESA	Miguel Angel Moreno		
Continental quota	America	6	6	GUA	Jorge Quintanal		
Invitations	Host nation	1	—	Australia	Andrew Collett		
Invitations	I.O.C./.I.J.F./ ANOC						

=== Lightweight (73 kg) ===
Qualification method		Places	Rank	NOC	Qualified judoka	Ranking points	Qualified* (not highest ranked in NOC)
World Championship		8	1	United States	Jimmy Pedro		
World Championship		8	2	Russia	Vitaliy Makarov		
World Championship		8	3	Brazil	Sebastian Pereira		
World Championship		8	4	Georgia	Georgi Revazichvili		
World Championship		8	5	Poland	Rafał Kozielewski		
World Championship		8	6	Hungary	Miklós Illyés		
World Championship		8	7	Puerto Rico	Carlos Méndez		
World Championship		8	8	Belarus	Anatoly Laryukov		
Continental quota	Africa	3	1	ALG	Noureddine Yagoubi		
Continental quota	Africa	3	2	TUN	Hassen Moussa		
Continental quota	Africa	3	3	EGY	Haitham Awad		
Continental quota	Asia	5	1	JPN	Kenzo Nakamura		
Continental quota	Asia	5	2	KAZ	Askhat Shakharov		
Continental quota	Asia	5	3	KOR	Choi Yong-sin		
Continental quota	Asia	5	4	UZB	Andrey Shturbabin		
Continental quota	Asia	5	5	KGZ	Sagdat Sadykov		
Continental quota	Europe	9	1	Portugal	Michel Almeida	153	
Continental quota	Europe	9	2	France	Ferrid Kheder	140	
Continental quota	Europe	9	3	Ukraine	Gennadiy Bilodid	90	
Continental quota	Europe	9	4	Israel	Gil Offer	71	
Continental quota	Europe	9	5	Germany	Martin Schmidt	70	
Continental quota	Europe	9	6	Latvia	Vsevolods Zeļonijs	70	
Continental quota	Europe	9	7	Italy	Giuseppe Maddaloni	66	
Continental quota	Europe	9	8	Romania	Claudiu Baștea	60	
Continental quota	Europe	9	9	Austria	Christoph Stangl	39	
Continental quota	Oceania	1	1				
Continental quota	America	6	1	VEN	Eduardo Manglés		
Continental quota	America	6	2	HAI	Ernst Laraque		
Continental quota	America	6	3	CUB	Hector Lombard		
Continental quota	America	6	4	ARG	Sebastian Alquati		
Continental quota	America	6	5	PER	Germán Velasco		
Continental quota	America	6	6	BAR	Andrew Payne		
Invitations	Host nation	1	—	Australia	Thomas Hill		
Invitations	I.O.C./.I.J.F./ ANOC						

=== Half-middleweight (81 kg) ===
Qualification method		Places	Rank	NOC	Qualified judoka	Ranking points	Qualified* (not highest ranked in NOC)
World Championship		8	1	Great Britain	Graeme Randall		
World Championship		8	2	Uzbekistan	Farkhod Turaev		
World Championship		8	3	North Korea	Kwak Ok-chol		
World Championship		8	4	South Korea	Cho In-chul		
World Championship		8	5	Portugal	Nuno Delgado		
World Championship		8	6	France	Djamel Bouras		
World Championship		8	7	Netherlands	Maarten Arens		
World Championship		8	8	Austria	Patrick Reiter		
Continental quota	Africa	3	1	MAR	Adil Belgaïd		
Continental quota	Africa	3	2	TUN	Abdessalem Arous		
Continental quota	Africa	3	3	NGR	Majemite Omagbaluwaje		
Continental quota	Asia	5	1	IRI	Kazem Sarikhani		
Continental quota	Asia	5	2	KAZ	Ruslan Seilkhanov		
Continental quota	Asia	5	3	MGL	Tsend-Ayuushiin Ochirbat		
Continental quota	Asia	5	4	JPN	Makoto Takimoto		
Continental quota	Asia	5	5	TPE	Chen Chun-ching		
Continental quota	Europe	9	1	Switzerland	Sergei Aschwanden	150	
Continental quota	Europe	9	2	Poland	Robert Krawczyk	110	
Continental quota	Europe	9	3	Azerbaijan	Mehman Azizov	106	
Continental quota	Europe	9	4	Estonia	Aleksei Budõlin	80	
Continental quota	Europe	9	5	Spain	Ricardo Echarte	70	
Continental quota	Europe	9	6	Hungary	Krisztián Tölgyesi	53	
Continental quota	Europe	9	7	Germany	Florian Wanner	50	
Continental quota	Europe	9	8	Belarus	Siarhei Kukharenka	31	
Continental quota	Europe	9	9	Italy	Francesco Lepre	31	
Continental quota	Oceania	1	1	New Zealand	Timothy Slyfield		
Continental quota	America	6	1	BRA	Marcel Aragão		
Continental quota	America	6	2	CUB	Gabriel Arteaga		
Continental quota	America	6	3	ARG	Dario García		
Continental quota	America	6	4	USA	Jason Morris		
Continental quota	America	6	5	PUR	José Figueroa		
Continental quota	America	6	6	VEN	Hermágoras Manglés		
Invitations	Host nation	1	—	Australia	Daniel Kelly		
Invitations	I.O.C./.I.J.F./ ANOC						

=== Middleweight (90 kg) ===
Qualification method		Places	Rank	NOC	Qualified judoka	Ranking points	Qualified* (not highest ranked in NOC)
World Championship		8	1	Japan	Hidehiko Yoshida		
World Championship		8	2	Moldova	Victor Florescu		
World Championship		8	3	South Korea	Yoo Sung-yeon		
World Championship		8	4	Romania	Adrian Croitoru		
World Championship		8	5	Brazil	Carlos Honorato		
World Championship		8	6	Kazakhstan	Sergey Shakimov		
World Championship		8	7	Canada	Keith Morgan		
World Championship		8	8	Cuba	Yosvany Despaigne		
Continental quota	Africa	3	1	TUN	Iskander Hachicha		
Continental quota	Africa	3	2	MRI	Jean Claude Raphael		
Continental quota	Africa	3	3	ALG	Khaled Meddah		
Continental quota	Asia	5	1	UZB	Kamol Muradov		
Continental quota	Asia	5	2	CHN	Xu Zhiming		
Continental quota	Asia	5	3	MGL	Batjargalyn Odkhüü		
Continental quota	Asia	5	4	TPE	Lee Chih-feng		
Continental quota	Asia	5	5	INA	Krisna Bayu		
Continental quota	Europe	9	1	Netherlands	Mark Huizinga	160	
Continental quota	Europe	9	2	France	Frédéric Demontfaucon	100	
Continental quota	Europe	9	3	Russia	Dmitri Morozov	100	
Continental quota	Europe	9	4	Ukraine	Ruslan Mashurenko	100	
Continental quota	Europe	9	5	Azerbaijan	Rasul Salimov	90	
Continental quota	Europe	9	6	Georgia	Georgi Gugava	90	
Continental quota	Europe	9	7	Italy	Michele Monti	80	
Continental quota	Europe	9	8	Germany	Marko Spittka	66	
Continental quota	Europe	9	9	Spain	Fernando González	60	
Continental quota	Oceania	1	1				
Continental quota	America	6	1	USA	Brian Olson		
Continental quota	America	6	2	ARG	Eduardo Costa		
Continental quota	America	6	3	DOM	Vicbart Geraldino		
Continental quota	America	6	4	VEN	Luis René López		
Continental quota	America	6	5	PUR	Carlos Santiago		
Continental quota	America	6	6	CHI	Gabriel Lama		
Invitations	Host nation	1	—	Australia	Robert Ivers		
Invitations	I.O.C./.I.J.F./ ANOC						

=== Half-heavyweight (100 kg) ===
Qualification method		Places	Rank	NOC	Qualified judoka	Ranking points	Qualified* (not highest ranked in NOC)
World Championship		8	1	Japan			
World Championship		8	2	South Korea	Jang Sung-ho		
World Championship		8	3	Russia	Alexandre Mikhaylin		
World Championship		8	4	Canada	Nicolas Gill		
World Championship		8	5	France	Stéphane Traineau		
World Championship		8	6	Israel	Ariel Ze'evi		
World Championship		8	7	Netherlands	Ben Sonnemans		
World Championship		8	8	Belarus	Leonid Svirid		
Continental quota	Africa	3	1	EGY	Bassel El Gharbawy		
Continental quota	Africa	3	2	ALG	Sami Belgroun		
Continental quota	Africa	3	3	TUN	Sadok Khalki		
Continental quota	Asia	5	1	UZB	Armen Bagdasarov		
Continental quota	Asia	5	2	TPE	Yen Kuo-che		
Continental quota	Asia	5	3	KAZ	Askhat Zhitkeyev		
Continental quota	Asia	5	4	CHN	Song Qitao		
Continental quota	Asia	5	5	KGZ	Vadim Sergeev		
Continental quota	Europe	9	1	Georgia	Iveri Jikurauli	140	
Continental quota	Europe	9	2	Hungary	Antal Kovács	100	
Continental quota	Europe	9	3	Lithuania	Marius Paškevičius	100	
Continental quota	Europe	9	4	Poland	Paweł Nastula	100	
Continental quota	Europe	9	5	Portugal	Pedro Soares	90	
Continental quota	Europe	9	6	Germany	Daniel Gürschner	85	
Continental quota	Europe	9	7	Italy	Luigi Guido	80	
Continental quota	Europe	9	8	Austria	Franz Birkfellner	55	
Continental quota	Europe	9	9	Romania	Radu Ivan	50	
Continental quota	Oceania	1	1	New Zealand	Daniel Gowing		
Continental quota	America	6	1	CUB	Yosvani Kessel		
Continental quota	America	6	2	BRA	Mário Sabino		
Continental quota	America	6	3	USA	Ato Hand		
Continental quota	America	6	4	ARG	Alejandro Bender		
Continental quota	America	6	5	DOM	José Augusto Geraldino		
Continental quota	America	6	6	VEN	Luís Gregorio López		
Invitations	Host nation	1	—	Australia	Daniel Rusitovic		
Invitations	I.O.C./.I.J.F./ ANOC						

=== Heavyweight (+100 kg) ===
Qualification method		Places	Rank	NOC	Qualified judoka	Ranking points	Qualified* (not highest ranked in NOC)
World Championship		8	1	Japan	Shinichi Shinohara		
World Championship		8	2	Estonia	Indrek Pertelson		
World Championship		8	3	China	Pan Song		
World Championship		8	4	Turkey	Selim Tataroğlu		
World Championship		8	5	France	Jérôme Dreyfus		
World Championship		8	6	Germany	Frank Möller		
World Championship		8	7	Russia	Tamerlan Tmenov		
World Championship		8	8	Poland	Rafał Kubacki		
Continental quota	Africa	3	1	ALG	Mohamed Bouaichaoui		
Continental quota	Africa	3	2	GAB	Steeve Nguema Ndong		
Continental quota	Africa	3	3	EGY	Ahmed Baly		
Continental quota	Asia	5	1	KAZ	Vyacheslav Berduta		
Continental quota	Asia	5	2	KOR	Ko Kyung-doo		
Continental quota	Asia	5	3	IRI	Mahmoud Miran		
Continental quota	Asia	5	4	MGL	Badmaanyambuugiin Bat-Erdene		
Continental quota	Asia	5	5	UZB	Abdullo Tangriev		
Continental quota	Europe	9	1	Netherlands	Dennis van der Geest	150	
Continental quota	Europe	9	2	Spain	Ernesto Pérez	140	
Continental quota	Europe	9	3	Romania	Gabriel Munteanu	90	
Continental quota	Europe	9	4	Georgia	Alexander Davitashvili	80	
Continental quota	Europe	9	5	Belgium	Harry van Barneveld	65	
Continental quota	Europe	9	6	Hungary	Imre Csösz	50	
Continental quota	Europe	9	7	Czech Republic	Petr Jákl	40	
Continental quota	Europe	9	8	Ukraine	Valentyn Ruslyakov	40	
Continental quota	Europe	9	9	Belarus	Ruslan Sharapov	35	
Continental quota	Oceania	1	1	Fiji	Nacanieli Qerewaqa		
Continental quota	America	6	1	CUB	Ángel Sánchez		
Continental quota	America	6	2	BRA	Daniel Hernandes		
Continental quota	America	6	3	ARG	Orlando Baccino		
Continental quota	America	6	4	USA	Martin Boonzaayer		
Continental quota	America	6	5	VEN	CARDOZO Douglas		
Continental quota	America	6	6	DOM	José Vásquez		
Invitations	Host nation	1	—	Australia	Robert Ball		
Invitations	I.O.C./.I.J.F./ ANOC						

== Women's events ==
=== Extra-lightweight (48 kg) ===
Qualification method		Places	Rank	NOC	Qualified judoka	Ranking points	Qualified* (not highest ranked in NOC)
World Championship		8	1	Japan	Ryoko Tamura		
World Championship		8	2	Cuba	Amarilis Savón		
World Championship		8	3	France	Sarah Nichilo-Rosso		
World Championship		8	4	Germany	Anna-Maria Gradante		
World Championship		8	5	Spain	Vanesa Arenas		
World Championship		8	6	South Korea	Park Sung-ja		
World Championship		8	7				
World Championship		8	8	Great Britain	Victoria Dunn		
Continental quota	Africa	2	1	TUN	Hayet Rouini		
Continental quota	Africa	2	2	RSA	Tania Tallie		
Continental quota	Asia	3	1	PRK	Cha Hyon-Hyang		
Continental quota	Asia	3	2	TKM	Galina Atayeva		
Continental quota	Asia	3	3	KGZ	Natalya Kuligina		
Continental quota	Europe	5	1	Romania	Laura Moise	140	
Continental quota	Europe	5	2	Russia	Lyubov Bruletova	140	
Continental quota	Europe	5	3	Belgium	Ann Simons	120	
Continental quota	Europe	5	4	Turkey	Neşe Şensoy Yıldız	80	
Continental quota	Europe	5	5	Ukraine	Lyudmyla Lusnikova	60	
Continental quota	Oceania	1	1				no applicant = IJF
Continental quota	America	3	1	USA	Lauren Meece		
Continental quota	America	3	2	BRA	Mariana Martins		
Continental quota	America	3	3	MEX	Adriana Angeles Lozada		CAN NOC decline
Invitations	Host nation	1	—	Australia	Jenny Hill		
Invitations	I.O.C./.I.J.F./ ANOC						

=== Half-lightweight (52 kg) ===
Qualification method		Places	Rank	NOC	Qualified judoka	Ranking points	Qualified* (not highest ranked in NOC)
World Championship		8	1	Japan	Noriko Narazaki		
World Championship		8	2	Cuba	Legna Verdecia		
World Championship		8	3	North Korea	Kye Sun-hui		
World Championship		8	4	France	Marie-Claire Restoux		
World Championship		8	5	China	Liu Yuxiang		
World Championship		8	6	Algeria	Salima Souakri		
World Championship		8	7	Canada	Luce Baillargeon		
World Championship		8	8	Great Britain	Deborah Allan		
Continental quota	Africa	2	1	MAD	Naina Ravaoarisoa		
Continental quota	Africa	2	2	CMR	Judith Aline Esseng Abollo		
Continental quota	Asia	3	1	KOR	Jang Jae-Sim		
Continental quota	Asia	3	2	TPE	Shih Pei-Chun		
Continental quota	Asia	3	3	IND	Lourembam Brojeshori Devi		
Continental quota	Europe	5	1	Netherlands	Deborah Gravenstijn	100	
Continental quota	Europe	5	2	Belgium	Inge Clement	90	
Continental quota	Europe	5	3	Spain	Miren León	90	
Continental quota	Europe	5	4	Switzerland	Isabelle Schmutz	90	
Continental quota	Europe	5	5	Romania	Ioana Maria Aluaş	65	
Continental quota	Oceania	1	1				
Continental quota	America	3	1	VEN	Jackelin Díaz		
Continental quota	America	3	2	ARG	Carolina Mariani		
Continental quota	America	3	3	USA	Hillary Wolf		
Invitations	Host nation	1	—	Australia	Rebecca Sullivan		
Invitations	I.O.C./.I.J.F./ ANOC			Liechtenstein	Ulrike Kaiser		

=== Lightweight (57 kg) ===
Qualification method		Places	Rank	NOC	Qualified judoka	Ranking points	Qualified* (not highest ranked in NOC)
World Championship		8	1	Cuba	Driulis González		
World Championship		8	2	Spain	Isabel Fernández		
World Championship		8	3	Netherlands	Jessica Gal		
World Championship		8	4	Czech Republic	Michaela Vernerová		
World Championship		8	5	Sweden	Pernilla Andersson		
World Championship		8	6	Azerbaijan	Zulfiyya Huseynova		
World Championship		8	7	France	Magali Baton		
World Championship		8	8	Israel	Orit Bar-On		
Continental quota	Africa	2	1	CMR	Françoise Nguele		
Continental quota	Africa	2	2	CIV	Rose Marie Kouaho		
Continental quota	Asia	3	1	JPN	Kie Kusakabe		
Continental quota	Asia	3	2	MGL	Khishigbatyn Erdenet-Od		
Continental quota	Asia	3	3	CHN	Shen Jun		
Continental quota	Europe	5	1	Great Britain	Cheryle Peel	150	
Continental quota	Europe	5	2	Belgium	Marisabel Lomba	100	
Continental quota	Europe	5	3	Italy	Cinzia Cavazzuti	80	
Continental quota	Europe	5	4	Portugal	Filipa Cavalleri	63	
Continental quota	Europe	5	5	Moldova	Ludmila Cristea	45	
Continental quota	Oceania	1	1				
Continental quota	America	3	1	BRA	Tânia Ferreira		
Continental quota	America	3	2	CAN	Michelle Buckingham		
Continental quota	America	3	3	USA	Ellen Wilson		
Invitations	Host nation	1	—	Australia	Maria Pekli		
Invitations	I.O.C./.I.J.F./ ANOC						

=== Half-middleweight (63 kg) ===
Qualification method		Places	Rank	NOC	Qualified judoka	Ranking points	Qualified* (not highest ranked in NOC)
World Championship		8	1	Japan	Keiko Maeda		
World Championship		8	2	Belgium	Gella Vandecaveye		
World Championship		8	3	Spain	Sara Álvarez		
World Championship		8	4	Great Britain	Karen Roberts		
World Championship		8	5	Hungary	Eszter Csizmadia		
World Championship		8	6	United States	Celita Schutz		
World Championship		8	7	China			
World Championship		8	8	Cuba	Kenia Rodríguez		
Continental quota	Africa	2	1	TUN	Nesria Traki		
Continental quota	Africa	2	2	NGR	Bilkisu Yusuf		
Continental quota	Asia	3	1	KOR	Jung Sung-Sook		
Continental quota	Asia	3	2	PRK	Ji Kyong-Sun		
Continental quota	Asia	3	3	KGZ	Olga Artamonova		
Continental quota	Europe	5	1	Russia	Anna Saraeva	140	
Continental quota	Europe	5	2	France	Séverine Vandenhende	120	
Continental quota	Europe	5	3	Italy	Jenny Gal	120	
Continental quota	Europe	5	4	Germany	Anja von Rekowski	90	
Continental quota	Europe	5	5	Netherlands	Daniëlle Vriezema	80	
Continental quota	Oceania	1	1				
Continental quota	America	3	1	BRA	Vânia Ishii		
Continental quota	America	3	2	CAN	Sophie Roberge		
Continental quota	America	3	3	DOM	Eleucadia Vargas		
Invitations	Host nation	1	—	Australia	Carly Dixon		
Invitations	I.O.C./.I.J.F./ ANOC						

=== Middleweight (70 kg) ===
Qualification method		Places	Rank	NOC	Qualified judoka	Ranking points	Qualified* (not highest ranked in NOC)
World Championship		8	1	Cuba	Sibelis Veranes		
World Championship		8	2	Belgium	Ulla Werbrouck		
World Championship		8	3	Great Britain	Kate Howey		
World Championship		8	4	Italy	Ylenia Scapin		
World Championship		8	5	Japan	Masae Ueno		
World Championship		8	6	Germany	Yvonne Wansart		
World Championship		8	7	Spain	Úrsula Martín		
World Championship		8	8	China	Qin Dongya		
Continental quota	Africa	2	1	CIV	Lea Zahoui Blavo		
Continental quota	Africa	2	2	TUN	Saida Dhahri		
Continental quota	Asia	3	1	MGL	Dorjgotovyn Tserenkhand		
Continental quota	Asia	3	2	KOR	Cho Min-Sun		
Continental quota	Asia	3	3	INA	Aprilia Marzuki		
Continental quota	Europe	5	1	Russia	Yulia Kuzina	130	
Continental quota	Europe	5	2	Netherlands	Edith Bosch	100	
Continental quota	Europe	5	3	France	Karine Rambault	60	
Continental quota	Europe	5	4	Czech Republic	Andrea Pažoutová	58	
Continental quota	Europe	5	5	Ukraine	Tetyana Byelyayeva	53	
Continental quota	Oceania	1	1				
Continental quota	America	3	1	USA	Sandra Bacher		
Continental quota	America	3	2	VEN	Xiomara Griffith		
Continental quota	America	3	3	ARG	Daniela Krukower		CAN NOC declined
Invitations	Host nation	1	—	Australia	Catherine Arlove		
Invitations	I.O.C./.I.J.F./ ANOC						

=== Half-heavyweight (78 kg) ===
Qualification method		Places	Rank	NOC	Qualified judoka	Ranking points	Qualified* (not highest ranked in NOC)
World Championship		8	1	Japan	Noriko Anno		
World Championship		8	2	China	Tang Lin		
World Championship		8	3	France	Céline Lebrun		
World Championship		8	4	Cuba	Diadenis Luna		
World Championship		8	5	Netherlands	Karin Kienhuis		
World Championship		8	6	South Korea	Lee So-yeon		
World Championship		8	7	Spain	Esther San Miguel		
World Championship		8	8	Portugal	Sandra Godinho		
Continental quota	Africa	2	1	GAB	Mélanie Engoang		
Continental quota	Africa	2	2	CIV	Akissi Monney		
Continental quota	Asia	3	1	MGL	Sambuugiin Dashdulam		
Continental quota	Asia	3	2	TKM	Nasiba Salaeva		
Continental quota	Asia	3	3	TPE	Hsu Yuan-lin		
Continental quota	Europe	5	1	Germany	Uta Kühnen	140	
Continental quota	Europe	5	2	Italy	Emanuela Pierantozzi	130	
Continental quota	Europe	5	3	Romania	Simona Richter	130	
Continental quota	Europe	5	4	Belgium	Heidi Rakels	120	
Continental quota	Europe	5	5	Great Britain	Chloe Cowen	120	
Continental quota	Oceania	1	1	Fiji	Laisa Laveti		
Continental quota	America	3	1	CAN	Kimberly Ribble		
Continental quota	America	3	2	BRA	Edinanci Silva		
Continental quota	America	3	3	USA	Amy Tong		
Invitations	Host nation	1	—	Australia	Natalie Jenkinson		
Invitations	I.O.C./.I.J.F./ ANOC						

=== Heavyweight (+78 kg) ===
Qualification method		Places	Rank	NOC	Qualified judoka	Ranking points	Qualified* (not highest ranked in NOC)
World Championship		8	1	Poland	Beata Maksymow		
World Championship		8	2	China	Yuan Hua		
World Championship		8	3	Japan	Miho Ninomiya		
World Championship		8	4	Great Britain	Karina Bryant		
World Championship		8	5	France	Christine Cicot		
World Championship		8	6	Belgium	Brigitte Olivier		
World Championship		8	7	United States	Colleen Rosensteel		
World Championship		8	8	Bulgaria	Tsvetana Bozhilova		
Continental quota	Africa	2	1	EGY	Heba Hefny		
Continental quota	Africa	2	2	SEN	Adja Marieme Diop		
Continental quota	Asia	3	1	KOR	Kim Seon-Young		
Continental quota	Asia	3	2	KAZ	Gulnara Kusherbayeva		
Continental quota	Asia	3	3	TPE	Lee Hsiao-hung		
Continental quota	Europe	5	1	Germany	Sandra Köppen	150	
Continental quota	Europe	5	2	Russia	Irina Rodina	110	
Continental quota	Europe	5	3	Ukraine	Maryna Prokof'yeva	60	
Continental quota	Europe	5	4	FR Yugoslavia	Mara Kovacevic	50	
Continental quota	Europe	5	5	Spain	Beatriz Martín	35	
Continental quota	Oceania	1	1	New Zealand	Fiona Iredale		
Continental quota	America	3	1	CUB	Daima Beltrán		
Continental quota	America	3	2	BRA	Priscila Marques		
Continental quota	America	3	3	ECU	Carmen Chalá		
Invitations	Host nation	1	—	Australia	Caroline Curren		
Invitations	I.O.C./.I.J.F./ ANOC						
