= North Korea at the 2000 Summer Olympics =

- IOC code: PRK
- NOC: Olympic Committee of the Democratic People's Republic of Korea

in Sydney
- Competitors: 32 (12 men & 20 women) in 10 sports
- Flag bearer: Pak Jung-Chul
- Medals Ranked 60th: Gold 0 Silver 1 Bronze 3 Total 4

Summer Olympics appearances (overview)
- 1972; 1976; 1980; 1984–1988; 1992; 1996; 2000; 2004; 2008; 2012; 2016; 2020; 2024; 2028

North Korea competed as the Democratic People's Republic of Korea at the 2000 Summer Olympics in Sydney, Australia. Athletes from North and South Korea marched together in the opening ceremony under the Unification Flag of Korea.

== Medalists ==
Medal	Name	Sport	Event
Silver	Ri Song-hui	Weightlifting	Women's 58 kg
Bronze	Kim Un-chol	Boxing	Men's light flyweight
Bronze	Kye Sun-hui	Judo	Women's 52 kg
Bronze	Kang Yong-gyun	Wrestling	Men's Greco-Roman 54 kg

== Archery ==
Athlete	Event	Ranking round		Round of 64	Round of 32	Round of 16	Quarterfinals	Semifinals	Final / BM	
Athlete	Event	Score	Seed	Opposition Score	Opposition Score	Opposition Score	Opposition Score	Opposition Score	Opposition Score	Rank
Choe Ok-sil	Women's individual	649	7	Suutari (FIN); W 161–149	Burdeyna (UKR); W 162–160	Serdyuk (UKR); W 160–153	Valeeva (ITA); W 107–103	Kim N-s (KOR); L 107–114	Bronze medal match Kim S-n (KOR); L 101–103	4

== Athletics ==
Track and road events

Athlete	Event	Heat		Quarterfinal		Semifinal		Final	
Athlete	Event	Time	Rank	Time	Rank	Time	Rank	Time	Rank
Kil Jae-son	Men's marathon	—N/a						2:25:13	59
Kim Jong-chol	Men's marathon	—N/a						2:18:04	30
Kim Jung-won	Men's marathon	—N/a						2:18:04	29
Ham Bong-sil	Women's marathon	—N/a						2:27:07	8
Jong Yong-ok	Women's marathon	—N/a						2:31:40	20
Kim Chang-ok	Women's marathon	—N/a						2:35:32	28

== Boxing ==
Athlete	Event	Round of 32	Round of 16	Quarterfinal	Semifinal	Final	
Athlete	Event	Opposition Result	Opposition Result	Opposition Result	Opposition Result	Opposition Result	Rank
Kim Un-chol	Light flyweight	Keketsi (LES); W RSC R4	Lakatos (HUN); W 20–8	Stapovičius (LTU); W 22–10	Lozano (ESP); L 10–15	Did not advance	3rd place, bronze medalist(s)

== Diving ==
Athlete	Event	Preliminary		Semifinal				Final		Total	
Athlete	Event	Points	Rank	Points	Rank	Total	Rank	Points	Rank	Points	Rank
Choe Hyong-gil	Men's 10 m platform	448.41	6 Q	185.52	9	633.93	6 Q	377.46	12	562.98	12
Pak Yong-ryong	Men's 3 m springboard	271.47	47	Did not advance							
Pak Yong-ryong	Men's 10 m platform	400.29	15 Q	181.74	11	582.03	16	Did not advance			
Choe Myong-hwa	Women's 10 m platform	308.73	8 Q	183.84	4	492.57	6 Q	269.22	11	453.06	10
Choe Song-hui	Women's 3 m springboard	222.84	33	Did not advance							
Ri Ok-rim	Women's 3 m springboard	238.77	26	Did not advance							
Ri Ok-rim	Women's 10 m platform	262.20	22	Did not advance							

== Gymnastics ==
=== Artistic ===
==== Men ====
Athlete	Event	Qualification								Final							
Athlete	Event	Apparatus						Total	Rank	Apparatus						Total	Rank
Athlete	Event	F	PH	R	V	PB	HB	Total	Rank	F	PH	R	V	PB	HB	Total	Rank
Pae Gil-su	All-around	7.550	9.762	6.375	8.537	8.237	7.950	48.411	53	Did not advance							
Pae Gil-su	Pommel horse	—N/a	9.762	—N/a				9.762	6 Q	—N/a	9.762	—N/a				9.762	5

==== Women ====
Athlete	Event	Qualification						Final					
Athlete	Event	Apparatus				Total	Rank	Apparatus				Total	Rank
Athlete	Event	V	UB	BB	F	Total	Rank	V	UB	BB	F	Total	Rank
Mok Un-ju	All-around	9.031	9.237	9.475	8.825	36.568	41	Did not advance					
Son Un-hui	All-around	0.000	9.425	8.212	8.537	26.174	77	Did not advance					

== Judo ==
Athlete	Event	Round of 64	Round of 32	Round of 16	Quarterfinal	Semifinal	Repechage 1	Repechage 2	Repechage 3	Repechage 4	Final / BM	
Athlete	Event	Opposition Result	Opposition Result	Opposition Result	Opposition Result	Opposition Result	Opposition Result	Opposition Result	Opposition Result	Opposition Result	Opposition Result	Rank
Kwak Ok-chol	Men's –81 kg	Bye	Manglés (VEN); W 0211–0010	Kukharenka (BLR); W 0010–0010	Bouras (FRA); L 0001–1000	Did not advance	—N/a		Arens (NED); W 1100–0010	Paseyro (URU); L 0001–1000	Did not advance	
Cha Hyon-hyang	Women's –48 kg	—N/a	Nichilo-Rosso (FRA); W 1000–0000	Atayeva (TKM); W 0011–0001	Arenas (ESP); W 0010–0001	Tamura (JPN); L 0010–0010	—N/a				Bronze Medal Bout; Simons (BEL); L 0011–0012	5
Kye Sun-hui	Women's –52 kg	—N/a	Wolf (USA); W 1120–0001	Gravenstijn (NED); W 0100–0001	Sullivan (AUS); W 1000–0000	Verdecia (CUB); L 0100–0100	—N/a				Bronze Medal Bout; Dinea (ROU); W 0200–0001	3rd place, bronze medalist(s)
Ji Kyong-sun	Women's –63 kg	—N/a	Vargas (DOM); W DQ	Vandecaveye (BEL); L 0001–1000	Did not advance							

== Shooting ==
Athlete	Event	Qualification		Final		Total	
Athlete	Event	Points	Rank	Points	Rank	Points	Rank
Kim Myong-hwa	Women's skeet	69	9	Did not advance			

== Synchronized swimming ==
Athlete	Event	Technical routine		Free routine (preliminary)				Free routine (final)		Total	
Athlete	Event	Points	Rank	Points	Rank	Total	Rank	Points	Rank	Points	Rank
Choe Son-yong; Jo Yong-hui	Duet	85.533	19	86.467	17	86.071	17	Did not advance			

== Weightlifting ==
Athlete	Event	Snatch		Clean & Jerk		Total	
Athlete	Event	Weight	Rank	Weight	Rank	Weight	Rank
Im Yong-su	Men's –62 kg	137.5	6	DNF			
Jon Chol-ho	Men's –77 kg	162.5	4	190.0	7	352.5	6
Ri Song-hui	Women's –58 kg	97.5 OR	1	122.5	2	220.0	2nd place, silver medalist(s)
Kim Yong-ok	Women's –63 kg	90.0	5	115.0	5	205.0	5

== Wrestling ==
Key:

- TO – Victory by Fall.
- SP – Decision by technical superiority (10 points difference) – the loser with technical points
- ST – Decision by technical superiority (10 points difference) – the loser without technical points
- PP – Decision by Points – the loser with technical points.
- PO – Decision by Points – the loser without technical points.
- VA – Victory by injury.

Athlete	Event	Elimination pool				Quarterfinals	Semifinals	Final / BM	
Athlete	Event	Opposition Result	Opposition Result	Opposition Result	Rank	Opposition Result	Opposition Result	Opposition Result	Rank
Kang Yong-gyun	Greco-Roman –54 kg	Shevtsov (RUS); W 3–1^{PP}	Sandu (ROU); L 1–3^{PP}	—N/a	1 Q	Wang (CHN); W 3–1^{PP}	Sim (KOR); L 0–4^{ST}	Bronze Medal Bout; Kalashnikov (UKR); W 3–0^{PO}	3rd place, bronze medalist(s)
Jin Ju-dong	Freestyle –54 kg	Abdullayev (AZE); L 0–3^{PO}	Liddle (NZL); W 4–0^{ST}	—N/a	2	Did not advance			
Ri Yong-sam	Freestyle –58 kg	Pogosian (GEO); L 1–3^{PP}	Fašánek (SVK); W 3–1^{PP}	—N/a	2	Did not advance			
Jo Yong-son	Freestyle –63 kg	Umakhanov (RUS); L 1–3^{PP}	Tedeyev (UKR); L 1–3^{PP}	—N/a	3	Did not advance			
