= Judo at the 2000 Summer Olympics – Women's 48 kg =

Women's 48 kg at the Games of the XXVII Olympiad
- Venue: Sydney Convention and Exhibition Centre
- Date: 16 September 2000
- Competitors: 23 from 23 nations

Medalists
| 1st place, gold medalist(s) | | Ryoko Tamura | Japan |
| 2nd place, silver medalist(s) | | Lyubov Bruletova | Russia |
| 3rd place, bronze medalist(s) | | Anna-Maria Gradante | Germany |
| 3rd place, bronze medalist(s) | | Ann Simons | Belgium |

These are the results of the women's 48 kg (also known as extra-lightweight) competition in judo at the 2000 Summer Olympics in Sydney. A total of 23 women qualified for this event, limited to jūdōka whose body weight was less than, or equal to, 48 kilograms. Competition took place in the Sydney Convention and Exhibition Centre on 16 September.

== Competitors ==
| Athlete | Nation |
|---|---|
| Tania Tallie | South Africa |
| Zhao Shunxin | China |
| Ryoko Tamura | Japan |
| Lyudmyla Lusnikova | Ukraine |
| Lauren Meece | United States |
| Neşe Şensoy Yıldız | Turkey |
| Maarit Kallio | Finland |
| Adriana Angeles Lozada | Mexico |
| Vanesa Arenas | Spain |
| Sarah Nichollo-Rosso | France |
| Cha Hyon-Hyang | North Korea |
| Galina Atayeva | Turkmenistan |
| Park Sung-Ja | South Korea |
| Laura Manuela Moise | Romania |
| Amarilis Savón | Cuba |
| Natalya Kuligina | Kyrgyzstan |
| Victoria Dunn | Great Britain |
| Lyubov Bruletova | Russia |
| Ann Simons | Belgium |
| Hayet Rouini | Tunisia |
| Jenny Hill | Australia |
| Anna-Maria Gradante | Germany |
| Mariana Martins | Brazil |

== Main bracket ==
The gold and silver medalists were determined by the final match of the main single-elimination bracket.

Round of 32
Tania Tallie (RSA) | L
Zhao Shunxin (CHN) | W
Lyudmyla Lusnikova (UKR) | W
Lauren Meece (USA) | L
Maarit Kallio (FIN) | L
Adriana Angeles (MEX) | W
Sarah Nichollo-Rosso (FRA) | L
Cha Hyon-Hyang (PRK) | W
Park Sung-Ja (KOR) | L
Laura Moise (ROU) | W
Natalya Kuligina (KGZ) | L
Victoria Dunn (GBR) | W
Ann Simons (BEL) | W
Hayet Rouini (TUN) | L

Round of 16
Zhao Shunxin (CHN) | L
Ryoko Tamura (JPN) | W
Lyudmyla Lusnikova (UKR) | W
Neşe Şensoy Yıldız (TUR) | L
Adriana Angeles Lozada (MEX) | L
Vanesa Arenas (ESP) | W
Cha Hyon-Hyang (PRK) | W
Galina Atayeva (TKM) | L
Laura Manuela Moise (ROU) | L
Amarilis Savón (CUB) | W
Victoria Dunn (GBR) | L
Lyubov Bruletova (RUS) | W
Ann Simons (BEL) | W
Jenny Hill (AUS) | L
Anna-Maria Gradante (GER) | W
Mariana Martins (BRA) | L

Quarterfinals
Ryoko Tamura (JPN) | W
Lyudmyla Lusnikova (UKR) | L
Vanesa Arenas (ESP) | L
Cha Hyon-Hyang (PRK) | W
Amarilis Savón (CUB) | L
Lyubov Bruletova (RUS) | W
Ann Simons (BEL) | L
Anna-Maria Gradante (GER) | W

Semifinals
Ryoko Tamura (JPN) | W
Cha Hyon-Hyang (PRK) | L
Lyubov Bruletova (RUS) | W
Anna-Maria Gradante (GER) | L

Gold medal final
Ryoko Tamura (JPN) | W
Lyubov Bruletova (RUS) | L

=== Repechage ===
The losing semifinalists as well as those judoka eliminated in earlier rounds by the four semifinalists of the main bracket advanced to the repechage. These matches determined the two bronze medalists for the event.

First round
Nichollo-Rosso (FRA) | W
Atayeva (TKM) | L
Zhao (CHN) | W
Bye | L
Dunn (GBR) | W
Bye | L
Martins (BRA) | W
Bye | L

Second round
Nichollo-Rosso (FRA) | W
Arenas (ESP) | L
Zhao (CHN) | W
Lusnikova (UKR) | L
Dunn (GBR) | L
Savon (CUB) | W
Martins (BRA) | L
Simons (BEL) | W

Third round
Nichollo-Rosso (FRA) | L
Zhao (CHN) | W
Savon (CUB) | L
Simons (BEL) | W

Bronze medal finals
Zhao (CHN) | L
Gradante (GER) | W
Simons (BEL) | W
Cha (PRK) | L
