= Amarilis Savón =

Cuban judoka (born 1974)

Personal information
- Full name: Amarilis Savón Carmenate
- Born: 13 May 1974 (age 52) Santiago de Cuba, Cuba
- Occupation: Judoka
- Height: 1.59 m (5 ft 3 in)

Sport
- Country: Cuba
- Sport: Judo
- Weight class: –48 kg, –52 kg

Achievements and titles
- Olympic Games: (bronze) (1992, 1996, 2004)
- World Champ.: (gold) (2003)
- Pan American Champ.: (gold) (1992, 1994, 1996, 1997, 1998, 2002, 2004)
Medal record
Women's judo
Representing Cuba
Olympic Games
Bronze medal – third place	1992 Barcelona	‍–‍48 kg
Bronze medal – third place	1996 Atlanta	‍–‍48 kg
Bronze medal – third place	2004 Athens	‍–‍52 kg
World Championships
Gold medal – first place	2003 Osaka	‍–‍52 kg
Silver medal – second place	1997 Paris	‍–‍48 kg
Silver medal – second place	1999 Birmingham	‍–‍48 kg
Bronze medal – third place	1995 Chiba	‍–‍48 kg
Pan American Games
Gold medal – first place	1995 Mara del Plata	‍–‍48 kg
Gold medal – first place	1999 Winnipeg	‍–‍48 kg
Gold medal – first place	2003 Santo Domingo	‍–‍52 kg
Pan American Championships
Gold medal – first place	1992 Ontario	‍–‍48 kg
Gold medal – first place	1994 Santiago	‍–‍48 kg
Gold medal – first place	1996 San Juan	‍–‍48 kg
Gold medal – first place	1997 Guadalajara	‍–‍48 kg
Gold medal – first place	1998 Santo Domingo	‍–‍48 kg
Gold medal – first place	2002 Santo Domingo	‍–‍52 kg
Gold medal – first place	2004 Isla Margarita	‍–‍52 kg
World Juniors Championships
Bronze medal – third place	1992 Buenos Aires	‍–‍48 kg
Summer Universiade
Silver medal – second place	1995 Fukuoka	‍–‍48 kg

Profile at external databases
- IJF: 48040
- JudoInside.com: 993
- Updated on 31 May 2023

Amarilis Savón Carmenate (born 13 May 1974) is a Cuban judoka who has competed at four Olympic Games and won three Olympic bronze medals at 1992 in Barcelona, 1996 in Atlanta and 2004 in Athens.

Currently living in Miami, Florida, in the United States serving as a lead instructor and coach at Somerset Academy Charter. She coached three athletes at the 2013 USA Judo Senior Nationals who earned one gold and one silver medal.

== Olympic Games Career ==
Amarilis first competed at the 1992 Summer Olympics in Barcelona for Cuba at the 1992 Summer Olympics. She competed in the women's extra lightweight category and finished third and won the bronze medal.

Four years later, Amarilis competed at the 1996 Summer Olympics in Atlanta. Her first bout was in the round of 16 against Algeria's Salima Souakri, the fifth-place finisher from the previous games. Amarilis won this bout to progress to her quarterfinals bout against Hillary Wolf of the United States and won once again. Amarilis lost her semifinals bout against eventual silver medal winner Ryoko Tamura but Amarilis went through to the repechage rounds for the bronze medals. Amarilis qualified straight for the bronze medal bout and was eventually paired against Sarah Nichilo from France. Amarilis won this bout and won another bronze medal.

At 2000 in Sydney, Amarilis didn't medal, she won her first bout against Laura Manuela Moise from Romania but lost her next bout in the quarterfinals to the silver medal winner from Russia, Lyubov Bruletova. This did mean however that she would go through to the repechage rounds for bronze medals. This time however, she didn't qualify straight for a bronze medal final. She won her first repechage bout against Victoria Dunn of Great Britain but lost her next bout to Belgium's bronze medal winner Ann Simons and didn't go through to the bronze medal bout.

2004 was Amarilis' last Olympics that she competed at and she won her last Olympic medal of her Olympic career. Her first bout was against Sweden's Sanna Askelöf and she won by a dominant 1000–0000. She won her second bout in the round of 16 was against Lee Eun-hee from South Korea and won dominantly once again 1010–0000. Her quarterfinals bout was against the other bronze medal winner Ilse Heylen from Belgium and won 0101–0000. Amarilis lost her semifinals bout to silver medalists Yuki Yokosawa of Japan by a score of 0010–1000. Amarilis' bronze medal bout was against Algeria's Salima Souakri and Amarilis won the bout 0100-0000 and the bronze medal.
