= 1999 World Judo Championships =

Judo competition

Judo 1999 World Judo Championships
- Venue: Arena Birmingham
- Location: (United Kingdom) Birmingham, Great Britain
- Dates: 7–10 October 1999
- Competitors: 619 from 91 nations

Competition at external databases
- Links: IJF • JudoInside

The 1999 World Judo Championships were the 21st edition of the World Judo Championships, and were held in Birmingham, England in 1999.

== Medal overview ==
=== Men ===
Event	Gold	Silver	Bronze
Extra-lightweight (60 kg)	Manolo Poulot (CUB)	Kazuhiko Tokuno (JPN)	Natig Bahirov (BLR)
Extra-lightweight (60 kg)	Manolo Poulot (CUB)	Kazuhiko Tokuno (JPN)	Nestor Khergiani (GEO)
Half-lightweight (66 kg)	Larbi Benboudaoud (FRA)	Hüseyin Özkan (TUR)	Patrick van Kalken (NED)
Half-lightweight (66 kg)	Larbi Benboudaoud (FRA)	Hüseyin Özkan (TUR)	Yordanis Arencibia (CUB)
Lightweight (73 kg)	Jimmy Pedro (USA)	Vitaliy Makarov (RUS)	Sebastian Pereira (BRA)
Lightweight (73 kg)	Jimmy Pedro (USA)	Vitaliy Makarov (RUS)	Georgi Revazichvili (GEO)
Half-middleweight (81 kg)	Graeme Randall (GBR)	Farkhod Turaev (UZB)	Kwak Ok-chol (PRK)
Half-middleweight (81 kg)	Graeme Randall (GBR)	Farkhod Turaev (UZB)	Cho In-chul (KOR)
Middleweight (90 kg)	Hidehiko Yoshida (JPN)	Victor Florescu (MDA)	Yoo Sung-yeon (KOR)
Middleweight (90 kg)	Hidehiko Yoshida (JPN)	Victor Florescu (MDA)	Adrian Croitoru (ROM)
Half-heavyweight (100 kg)	Kosei Inoue (JPN)	Jang Sung-ho (KOR)	Alexandre Mikhaylin (RUS)
Half-heavyweight (100 kg)	Kosei Inoue (JPN)	Jang Sung-ho (KOR)	Nicolas Gill (CAN)
Heavyweight (+100 kg)	Shinichi Shinohara (JPN)	Indrek Pertelson (EST)	Pan Song (CHN)
Heavyweight (+100 kg)	Shinichi Shinohara (JPN)	Indrek Pertelson (EST)	Selim Tataroğlu (TUR)
Openweight	Shinichi Shinohara (JPN)	Selim Tataroğlu (TUR)	Dennis van der Geest (NED)
Openweight	Shinichi Shinohara (JPN)	Selim Tataroğlu (TUR)	Harry Van Barneveld (BEL)

=== Women ===
Event	Gold	Silver	Bronze
Extra-lightweight (48 kg)	Ryoko Tamura (JPN)	Amarilis Savón (CUB)	Sarah Nichilo-Rosso (FRA)
Extra-lightweight (48 kg)	Ryoko Tamura (JPN)	Amarilis Savón (CUB)	Anna-Maria Gradante (GER)
Half-lightweight (52 kg)	Noriko Narazaki (JPN)	Legna Verdecia (CUB)	Kye Sun-hui (PRK)
Half-lightweight (52 kg)	Noriko Narazaki (JPN)	Legna Verdecia (CUB)	Marie-Claire Restoux (FRA)
Lightweight (57 kg)	Driulis González (CUB)	Isabel Fernández (ESP)	Jessica Gal (NED)
Lightweight (57 kg)	Driulis González (CUB)	Isabel Fernández (ESP)	Michaela Vernerová (CZE)
Half-middleweight (63 kg)	Keiko Maeda (JPN)	Gella Vandecaveye (BEL)	Sara Álvarez (ESP)
Half-middleweight (63 kg)	Keiko Maeda (JPN)	Gella Vandecaveye (BEL)	Karen Roberts (GBR)
Middleweight (70 kg)	Sibelis Veranes (CUB)	Ulla Werbrouck (BEL)	Kate Howey (GBR)
Middleweight (70 kg)	Sibelis Veranes (CUB)	Ulla Werbrouck (BEL)	Ylenia Scapin (ITA)
Half-heavyweight (78 kg)	Noriko Anno (JPN)	Yin Yufeng (CHN)	Céline Lebrun (FRA)
Half-heavyweight (78 kg)	Noriko Anno (JPN)	Yin Yufeng (CHN)	Diadenis Luna (CUB)
Heavyweight (+78 kg)	Beata Maksymow (POL)	Yuan Hua (CHN)	Miho Ninomiya (JPN)
Heavyweight (+78 kg)	Beata Maksymow (POL)	Yuan Hua (CHN)	Karina Bryant (GBR)
Openweight	Daima Beltrán (CUB)	Miho Ninomiya (JPN)	Tsvetana Bozhilova (BUL)
Openweight	Daima Beltrán (CUB)	Miho Ninomiya (JPN)	Choi Sook-ie (KOR)

=== Medal table ===
Rank	Nation	Gold	Silver	Bronze	Total
1	Japan (JPN)	8	2	1	11
2	Cuba (CUB)	4	2	2	8
3	France (FRA)	1	0	3	4
3	Great Britain (GBR)	1	0	3	4
5	Poland (POL)	1	0	0	1
5	United States (USA)	1	0	0	1
7	Belgium (BEL)	0	2	1	3
7	China (CHN)	0	2	1	3
7	Turkey (TUR)	0	2	1	3
10	South Korea (KOR)	0	1	3	4
11	Russia (RUS)	0	1	1	2
11	Spain (ESP)	0	1	1	2
13	Estonia (EST)	0	1	0	1
13	Moldova (MDA)	0	1	0	1
13	Uzbekistan (UZB)	0	1	0	1
16	Netherlands (NED)	0	0	3	3
17	Georgia (GEO)	0	0	2	2
17	North Korea (PRK)	0	0	2	2
19	Belarus (BLR)	0	0	1	1
19	Brazil (BRA)	0	0	1	1
19	Bulgaria (BUL)	0	0	1	1
19	Canada (CAN)	0	0	1	1
19	Czech Republic (CZE)	0	0	1	1
19	Germany (GER)	0	0	1	1
19	Italy (ITA)	0	0	1	1
19	Romania (ROU)	0	0	1	1
Totals (26 entries)		16	16	32	64

== Results overview ==
=== Men ===
==== 60 kg ====
Position	Judoka	Country
1.	Manolo Poulot	Cuba
2.	Kazuhiko Tokuno	Japan
3.	Natig Bahirov	Belarus
3.	Nestor Khergiani	Georgia
5.	John Buchanan	Great Britain
5.	Dorjpalamyn Narmandakh	Mongolia
7.	Vardan Voskanyan	Armenia
7.	Evguani Stanev	Russia

==== 66 kg ====
Position	Judoka	Country
1.	Larbi Benboudaoud	France
2.	Hüseyin Özkan	Turkey
3.	Patrick van Kalken	Netherlands
3.	Yordanis Arencibia	Cuba
5.	Ludwing Ortiz	Venezuela
5.	Han Ji-hwan	South Korea
7.	Kiyoshi Uematsu	Spain
7.	Purevdor Nyamlkhagva	Mongolia

==== 73 kg ====
Position	Judoka	Country
1.	Jimmy Pedro	United States
2.	Vitaliy Makarov	Russia
3.	Sebastian Pereira	Brazil
3.	Georgi Revazichvili	Georgia
5.	Rafał Kozielewski	Poland
5.	Miklós Illyés	Hungary
7.	inCarlos Méndez	Puerto Rico
7.	Anatoly Laryukov	Belarus

==== 81 kg ====
Position	Judoka	Country
1.	Graeme Randall	Great Britain
2.	Farkhod Turaev	Uzbekistan
3.	Kwak Ok-chol	North Korea
3.	Cho In-chul	South Korea
5.	Nuno Delgado	Portugal
5.	Djamel Bouras	France
7.	Maarten Arens	Netherlands
7.	Patick Reiter	Austria

==== 90 kg ====
Position	Judoka	Country
1.	Hidehiko Yoshida	Japan
2.	Victor Florescu	Moldova
3.	Yoo Sung-yeon	South Korea
3.	Adrian Croitoru	Romania
5.	Carlos Honorato	Brazil
5.	Sergey Shakimov	Kazakhstan
7.	Keith Morgan	Canada
7.	Yosvany Despaigne	Cuba

==== 100 kg ====
Position	Judoka	Country
1.	Kosei Inoue	Japan
2.	Jang Sung-ho	South Korea
3.	Alexandre Mikhaylin	Russia
3.	Nicolas Gill	Canada
5.	Stéphane Traineau	France
5.	Ariel Ze'evi	Israel
7.	Martin van den Berg	Netherlands
7.	Leonid Svirid	Belarus

==== +100 kg ====
Position	Judoka	Country
1.	Shinichi Shinohara	Japan
2.	Indrek Pertelson	Estonia
3.	Pan Song	China
3.	Selim Tataroğlu	Turkey
5.	Jérôme Dreyfus	France
5.	Frank Möller	Germany
7.	Tamerlan Tmenov	Russia
7.	Rafał Kubacki	Poland

==== Open class ====
Position	Judoka	Country
1.	Shinichi Shinohara	Japan
2.	Selim Tataroğlu	Turkey
3.	Dennis van der Geest	Netherlands
3.	Harry Van Barneveld	Belgium
5.	Aleksi Davidashvili	Georgia
5.	Daniel Hernandes	Brazil
7.	Koba Nadiradze	Ukraine
7.	Patrice Rognon	France

=== Women ===
==== 48 kg ====
Position	Judoka	Country
1.	Ryoko Tamura	Japan
2.	Amarilis Savón	Cuba
3.	Sarah Nichilo-Rosso	France
3.	Anna-Maria Gradante	Germany
5.	Vanesa Arenas	Spain
5.	Park Sung-ja	South Korea
7.	Huang Lihong	China
7.	Victoria Dunn	Great Britain

==== 52 kg ====
Position	Judoka	Country
1.	Noriko Narazaki	Japan
2.	Legna Verdecia	Cuba
3.	Kye Sun-hui	North Korea
3.	Marie-Claire Restoux	France
5.	Liu Yuxiang	China
5.	Salima Souakri	Algeria
7.	Luce Baillargeon	Canada
7.	Deborah Allan	Great Britain

==== 57 kg ====
Position	Judoka	Country
1.	Driulis González	Cuba
2.	Isabel Fernández	Spain
3.	Jessica Gal	Netherlands
3.	Michaela Vernerová	Czech Republic
5.	Pernilla Andersson	Sweden
5.	Zulfiyya Huseynova	Azerbaijan
7.	Magali Baton	France
7.	Orit Bar-On	Israel

==== 63 kg ====
Position	Judoka	Country
1.	Keiko Maeda	Japan
2.	Gella Vandecaveye	Belgium
3.	Sara Álvarez	Spain
3.	Karen Roberts	Great Britain
5.	Eszter Csizmadia	Hungary
5.	Celita Schutz	United States
7.	Sun Xiaofang	China
7.	Kenia Rodríguez	Cuba

==== 70 kg ====
Position	Judoka	Country
1.	Sibelis Veranes	Cuba
2.	Ulla Werbrouck	Belgium
3.	Kate Howey	Great Britain
3.	Ylenia Scapin	Italy
5.	Masae Ueno	Japan
5.	Yvonne Wansart	Germany
7.	Úrsula Martín	Spain
7.	Qin Dongya	China

==== 78 kg ====
Position	Judoka	Country
1.	Noriko Anno	Japan
2.	Yin Yufeng	China
3.	Céline Lebrun	France
3.	Diadenis Luna	Cuba
5.	Karin Kienhuis	Netherlands
5.	Kang Min-jung	South Korea
7.	Esther San Miguel	Spain
7.	Sandra Godinho	Portugal

==== +78 kg ====
Position	Judoka	Country
1.	Beata Maksymow	Poland
2.	Yuan Hua	China
3.	Miho Ninomiya	Japan
3.	Karina Bryant	Great Britain
5.	Christine Cicot	France
5.	Brigitte Olivier	Belgium
7.	Colleen Rosensteel	United States
7.	Tsvetana Bozhilova	Bulgaria

==== Open class ====
Position	Judoka	Country
1.	Daima Beltrán	Cuba
2.	Miho Ninomiya	Japan
3.	Tsvetana Bozhilova	Bulgaria
3.	Choi Sook-ie	South Korea
5.	Svetlana Goundarenko	Russia
5.	Priscila Marques	Brazil
7.	Zhang Qingli	China
7.	Françoise Harteveld	Netherlands
