= 2000 European Judo Championships =

2000 Judo European Judo Championships
- Venue: Centennial Hall
- Location: Wrocław, Poland
- Dates: 20–21 May 2000

Competition at external databases
- Links: JudoInside

The 2000 European Judo Championships were the 11th edition of the European Judo Championships, and were held at Hala Ludowa – People's Hall in Wrocław, Poland from 20 to 21 May 2000.

== Medal overview ==
=== Men ===
Event	Gold	Silver	Bronze
60 kg	(Azerbaijan) Elchin Ismayilov	(France) Éric Despezelle	(Belgium) Cédric Taymans (Georgia (country)) Nestor Khergiani
66 kg	(Netherlands) Patrick van Kalken	(Hungary) József Csák	(Italy) Girolamo Giovinazzo (Bulgaria) Georgi Georgiev
73 kg	(Portugal) Michel Almeida	(Russia) Vitali Makarov	(France) Ferrid Kheder (Georgia (country)) Giorgi Revazishvili
81 kg	(Switzerland) Sergei Aschwanden	(Spain) Ricardo Echarte	(Estonia) Aleksei Budõlin (Poland) Robert Krawczyk
90 kg	(Romania) Adrian Croitoru	(Netherlands) Mark Huizinga	(Ukraine) Ruslan Mashurenko (Azerbaijan) Rasul Salimov
100 kg	(Russia) Youri Stepkine	(Germany) Daniel Gürschner	(Austria) Franz Birkfellner (Georgia (country)) Iveri Jikurauli
+100 kg	(Netherlands) Dennis van der Geest	(Russia) Tamerlan Tmenov	(Germany) Frank Möller (Spain) Ernesto Pérez
Open class	(Spain) Aythami Ruano	(Turkey) Selim Tataroğlu	(Germany) Frank Möller (Georgia (country)) Aleksi Davitashvili

=== Women ===
Event	Gold	Silver	Bronze
48 kg	(Romania) Laura Moise	(Russia) Lioubov Brouletova	(Germany) Julia Matijass (France) Sarah Nichilo-Rosso
52 kg	(France) Laetitia Tignola	(United Kingdom) Georgina Singleton	(Netherlands) Deborah Gravenstijn (Romania) Ioana Maria Aluaș
57 kg	(France) Barbara Harel	(Sweden) Pernilla Andersson	(Netherlands) Jessica Gal (Czech Republic) Michaela Vernerová
63 kg	(Belgium) Gella Vandecaveye	(France) Séverine Vandenhende	(Russia) Anna Saraeva (Spain) Sara Álvarez
70 kg	(Spain) Úrsula Martín	(United Kingdom) Kate Howey	(Belgium) Ulla Werbrouck (Italy) Ylenia Scapin
78 kg	(France) Céline Lebrun	(United Kingdom) Chloe Cowen	(Germany) Uta Kühnen (Ukraine) Anastasiya Matrosova
+78 kg	(United Kingdom) Karina Bryant	(Russia) Irina Rodina	(Germany) Johanna Hagn (France) Christine Cicot
Open class	(Germany) Katja Gerber	(Italy) Lucia Morico	(Russia) Tea Donguzashvili (Bulgaria) Tsvetana Bozhilova

=== Medals table ===
Rank	Nation	Gold	Silver	Bronze	Total
1	France	3	2	3	8
2	Netherlands	2	1	2	5
2	Spain	2	1	2	5
4	Romania	2	0	1	3
5	Russia	1	4	2	7
6	Great Britain	1	3	0	4
7	Germany	1	1	5	6
8	Belgium	1	0	2	3
9	Azerbaijan	1	0	1	1
10	Portugal	1	0	0	1
10	Switzerland	1	0	0	1
12	Italy	0	1	2	3
13	Hungary	0	1	0	1
13	Sweden	0	1	0	1
13	Turkey	0	1	0	1
16	Georgia	0	0	4	4
17	Bulgaria	0	0	2	2
17	Ukraine	0	0	2	2
19	Austria	0	0	1	1
19	Czech Republic	0	0	1	1
19	Estonia	0	0	1	1
19	Poland	0	0	1	1

== Results overview ==
=== Men ===
==== 60 kg ====
Position	Judoka	Country
1.	Elchin Ismayilov	Azerbaijan
2.	Éric Despezelle	France
3.	Cédric Taymans	Belgium
3.	Nestor Khergiani	Georgia
5.	John Buchanan	Great Britain
5.	Jacek Cyran	Poland
7.	David Moret	Switzerland
7.	Vardan Voskanyan	Russia

==== 66 kg ====
Position	Judoka	Country
1.	Patrick van Kalken	Netherlands
2.	József Csák	Hungary
3.	Girolamo Giovinazzo	Italy
3.	Georgi Georgiev	Bulgaria
5.	Jarosław Lewak	Poland
5.	Victor Bivol	Moldova
7.	Islam Matsiev	Russia
7.	Rachad Mamedov	Belarus

==== 73 kg ====
Position	Judoka	Country
1.	Michel Almeida	Portugal
2.	Vitali Makarov	Russia
3.	Ferrid Kheder	France
3.	Giorgi Revazishvili	Georgia
5.	Claudiu Baștea	Romania
5.	Gennadiy Bilodid	Ukraine
7.	Olivier Schmutz	Switzerland
7.	Marko Sentić	Croatia

==== 81 kg ====
Position	Judoka	Country
1.	Sergei Aschwanden	Switzerland
2.	Ricardo Echarte	Spain
3.	Aleksei Budõlin	Estonia
3.	Robert Krawczyk	Poland
5.	Alexei Cherchnev	Russia
5.	Valentyn Grekov	Ukraine
7.	Maarten Arens	Netherlands
7.	Dirk Radszat	Germany

==== 90 kg ====
Position	Judoka	Country
1.	Adrian Croitoru	Romania
2.	Mark Huizinga	Netherlands
3.	Ruslan Mashurenko	Ukraine
3.	Rasul Salimov	Azerbaijan
5.	George Gugava	Georgia
5.	Frédéric Demontfaucon	France
7.	Dmitri Morozov	Russia
7.	Fernando González	Spain

==== 100 kg ====
Position	Judoka	Country
1.	Youri Stepkine	Russia
2.	Daniel Gürschner	Germany
3.	Franz Birkfellner	Austria
3.	Iveri Jikurauli	Georgia
5.	Luigi Guido	Italy
5.	Pedro Soares	Portugal
7.	Ghislain Lemaire	France
7.	Anatoli Droga	Ukraine

==== +100 kg ====
Position	Judoka	Country
1.	Dennis van der Geest	Netherlands
2.	Tamerlan Tmenov	Russia
3.	Frank Möller	Germany
3.	Ernesto Pérez	Spain
5.	Gabriel Munteanu	Romania
5.	Ruslan Sharapov	Belarus
7.	Valentin Ruslyakov	Ukraine
7.	Petr Jákl	Czech Republic

==== Open class ====
Position	Judoka	Country
1.	Aythami Ruano	Spain
2.	Selim Tataroğlu	Turkey
3.	Frank Möller	Germany
3.	Aleksi Davitashvili	Georgia
5.	Rafał Kubacki	Poland
5.	Jérôme Dreyfus	France
7.	Gabriel Munteanu	Romania
7.	Zoltán Csizmadia	Hungary

=== Women ===
==== 48 kg ====
Position	Judoka	Country
1.	Laura Moise	Romania
2.	Lioubov Brouletova	Russia
3.	Julia Matijass	Germany
3.	Sarah Nichilo-Rosso	France
5.	Monika Kurath	Switzerland
5.	Tatiana Moskvina	Belarus
7.	Lioudmila Lusnikova	Ukraine
7.	Neşe Şensoy	Turkey

==== 52 kg ====
Position	Judoka	Country
1.	Laëtitia Tignola	France
2.	Georgina Singleton	Great Britain
3.	Deborah Gravenstijn	Netherlands
3.	Ioana Maria Aluaș	Romania
5.	Raffaella Imbriani	Germany
5.	Antonia Cuomo	Italy
7.	Inge Clement	Belgium
7.	Paula Saldanha	Portugal

==== 57 kg ====
Position	Judoka	Country
1.	Barbara Harel	France
2.	Pernilla Andersson	Sweden
3.	Jessica Gal	Netherlands
3.	Michaela Vernerová	Czech Republic
5.	Karoline Kubatzki	Germany
5.	Jenni Brien	Great Britain
7.	Marisabel Lomba	Belgium
7.	Cinzia Cavazzuti	Italy

==== 63 kg ====
Position	Judoka	Country
1.	Gella Vandecaveye	Belgium
2.	Séverine Vandenhende	France
3.	Anna Saraeva	Russia
3.	Sara Álvarez	Spain
5.	Jenny Gal	Italy
5.	Daniëlle Vriezema	Netherlands
7.	Anja Von Rekowski	Germany
7.	Regina Mickutė	Lithuania

==== 70 kg ====
Position	Judoka	Country
1.	Úrsula Martín	Spain
2.	Kate Howey	Great Britain
3.	Ulla Werbrouck	Belgium
3.	Ylenia Scapin	Italy
5.	Annett Böhm	Germany
5.	Karine Rambault	France
7.	Edith Bosch	Netherlands
7.	Catarina Rodrigues	Portugal

==== 78 kg ====
Position	Judoka	Country
1.	Céline Lebrun	France
2.	Chloe Cowen	Great Britain
3.	Uta Kühnen	Germany
3.	Anastasiya Matrosova	Ukraine
5.	Emanuela Pierantozzi	Italy
5.	Simona Richter	Romania
7.	Esther San Miguel	Spain
7.	Anna Koroza	Poland

==== +78 kg ====
Position	Judoka	Country
1.	Karina Bryant	Great Britain
2.	Irina Rodina	Russia
3.	Johanna Hagn	Germany
3.	Christine Cicot	France
5.	Françoise Harteveld	Netherlands
5.	Tsvetana Bozhilova	Bulgaria
7.	Brigitte Olivier	Belgium
7.	Mara Kovačević	Yugoslavia

==== Open class ====
Position	Judoka	Country
1.	Katja Gerber	Germany
2.	Lucia Morico	Italy
3.	Tea Donguzashvili	Russia
3.	Tsvetana Bozhilova	Bulgaria
5.	Éva Gránitz	Hungary
5.	Simone Callender	Great Britain
7.	Małgorzata Górnicka	Poland
7.	Susana Somolinos	Spain
