= 1992 World Judo Juniors Championships =

Judo competition

Judo 1992 World Judo Juniors Championships
- Location: Buenos Aires, Argentina
- Dates: 8–11 October 1992

Competition at external databases
- Links: JudoInside

The 1992 World Judo Juniors Championships was an edition of the World Judo Juniors Championships, organised by the International Judo Federation. It was held in Buenos Aires, Argentina from 8 to 11 October 1992.

== Medal summery ==
=== Men's events ===
Event	Gold	Silver	Bronze
Extra-lightweight (−60 kg)	Ryuji Sonoda (JPN)	Bismar Reyes Hernández (CUB)	Sebastian Hampel (GER)
Extra-lightweight (−60 kg)	Ryuji Sonoda (JPN)	Bismar Reyes Hernández (CUB)	Hyuk Kim (KOR)
Half-lightweight (−65 kg)	Ian Freeman (GBR)	Henrique Guimaraes (BRA)	Miklós Illyés (HUN)
Half-lightweight (−65 kg)	Ian Freeman (GBR)	Henrique Guimaraes (BRA)	Takashi Iwasaki (JPN)
Lightweight (−71 kg)	Patrick Reiter (AUT)	Takehisa Iwakawa (JPN)	Tino Buchholz (GER)
Lightweight (−71 kg)	Patrick Reiter (AUT)	Takehisa Iwakawa (JPN)	Danny Kingston (GBR)
Half-middleweight (−78 kg)	Darcel Yandzi (FRA)	Dong-Sik Yoon (KOR)	Alexandru Ciupe (ROU)
Half-middleweight (−78 kg)	Darcel Yandzi (FRA)	Dong-Sik Yoon (KOR)	Marcus Dawson (USA)
Middleweight (−86 kg)	Masaru Tanabe (JPN)	Nicolas Gill (CAN)	Young-Ho Han (KOR)
Middleweight (−86 kg)	Masaru Tanabe (JPN)	Nicolas Gill (CAN)	Ghislain Lemaire (FRA)
Half-heavyweight (−95 kg)	Chong-Seok Lee (KOR)	Antal Kovács (HUN)	Elton Fiebig (BRA)
Half-heavyweight (−95 kg)	Chong-Seok Lee (KOR)	Antal Kovács (HUN)	Sven Helbing (GER)
Heavyweight (+95 kg)	Ralf Koser (GER)	Jérôme Lorenzini (FRA)	Pascal De Groof (BEL)
Heavyweight (+95 kg)	Ralf Koser (GER)	Jérôme Lorenzini (FRA)	Yoshiharu Makishi (JPN)

=== Women's events ===
Event	Gold	Silver	Bronze
Extra-lightweight (−48 kg)	Hao Ying (CHN)	Atsuko Nagai (JPN)	Philippa Gemmill (GBR)
Extra-lightweight (−48 kg)	Hao Ying (CHN)	Atsuko Nagai (JPN)	Amarilis Savón (CUB)
Half-lightweight (−52 kg)	Zhao Chun Hong (CHN)	Hitomi Yamaguchi (JPN)	Cheryle Peel (GBR)
Half-lightweight (−52 kg)	Zhao Chun Hong (CHN)	Hitomi Yamaguchi (JPN)	Salima Souakri (ALG)
Lightweight (−56 kg)	Karen Roberts (GBR)	Nancy van Stokkum (NED)	Sung-Hye Kim (KOR)
Lightweight (−56 kg)	Karen Roberts (GBR)	Nancy van Stokkum (NED)	Karine Paillard (FRA)
Half-middleweight (−61 kg)	Hyun-Hee Jeon (KOR)	Deborah Gravenstijn (NED)	Zsuzsa Nagy (HUN)
Half-middleweight (−61 kg)	Hyun-Hee Jeon (KOR)	Deborah Gravenstijn (NED)	Séverine Vandenhende (FRA)
Middleweight (−66 kg)	Chui Ping Chen (TPE)	Sabine Van Crombrugge (BEL)	Natsuko Sano (JPN)
Middleweight (−66 kg)	Chui Ping Chen (TPE)	Sabine Van Crombrugge (BEL)	Ling Nie Yu (CHN)
Half-heavyweight (−72 kg)	Saki Yoshida (JPN)	Carine Varlez (FRA)	Ylenia Scapin (ITA)
Half-heavyweight (−72 kg)	Saki Yoshida (JPN)	Carine Varlez (FRA)	Cindy Sneevliet (NED)
Heavyweight (+72 kg)	Hua Yuan (CHN)	Noriko Anno (JPN)	Marlène Ivars (FRA)
Heavyweight (+72 kg)	Hua Yuan (CHN)	Noriko Anno (JPN)	Stacey Smith (GBR)

Source Results

=== Medal table ===
* Host nation (Argentina)

Rank	Nation	Gold	Silver	Bronze	Total
1	Japan (JPN)	3	4	3	10
2	China (CHN)	3	0	1	4
3	South Korea (KOR)	2	1	3	6
4	Great Britain (GBR)	2	0	4	6
5	France (FRA)	1	2	4	7
6	Germany (GER)	1	0	3	4
7	Austria (AUT)	1	0	0	1
7	Chinese Taipei (TPE)	1	0	0	1
9	Netherlands (NED)	0	2	1	3
10	Hungary (HUN)	0	1	2	3
11	Belgium (BEL)	0	1	1	2
11	Brazil (BRA)	0	1	1	2
11	Cuba (CUB)	0	1	1	2
14	Canada (CAN)	0	1	0	1
15	Algeria (ALG)	0	0	1	1
15	Italy (ITA)	0	0	1	1
15	Romania (ROU)	0	0	1	1
15	United States (USA)	0	0	1	1
Totals (18 entries)		14	14	28	56
