= Georgi Gugava =

Georgian judoka (born 1978)

Personal information
- Born: 10 November 1978 (age 47)
- Occupation: Judoka

Sport
- Country: Georgia
- Sport: Judo
- Weight class: ‍–‍86 kg, ‍–‍90 kg, ‍–‍100 kg

Achievements and titles
- Olympic Games: R32 (2000)
- World Champ.: 9th (1997, 1999)
- European Champ.: 5th (1999, 2000)
Medal record
Men's judo
Representing Georgia
European Junior Championships
Gold medal – first place	1997 Ljubljana	‍–‍95 kg

Profile at external databases
- IJF: 3711
- JudoInside.com: 403
- Updated on 20 February 2025

Georgi Gugava (born 10 November 1978) is a Georgian judoka.

== Achievements ==
Year	Tournament	Place	Weight class
2000	European Judo Championships	5th	Middleweight (90 kg)
1999	European Judo Championships	5th	Middleweight (90 kg)
