= Jenny Hill =

Jenny Hill may refer to:

- Jenny Hill (journalist), BBC News reporter and presenter
- Jenny Hill (music hall performer) (1848–1896), British music hall performer
- Jenny Hill (politician), mayor of the City of Townsville, Queensland, Australia
- Jenny Hill (judoka) (born 1972), Australian Olympic judoka, member of the Hill family
- Jenny Hill (musician), British double bass player, composer and producer

== See also ==
- Jenn Hill, American politician from Michigan
- Jenni Hill (artist), Australian artist in the Progressive Art Movement in Adelaide in the 1970s
