= Lyudmyla Lusnikova =

Ukrainian judoka

Personal information
- Full name: Lyudmyla Yuriïvna Lusnikova
- Nationality: Ukraine
- Born: 7 January 1982 (age 44) Zaporizhia, Ukrainian SSR, Soviet Union
- Height: 1.58 m (5 ft 2 in)
- Weight: 48 kg (106 lb)

Sport
- Sport: Judo
- Event: 48 kg
- Club: Ukraïna Zaporizhzhia (UKR)

Lyudmyla Yuriïvna Lusnikova (Ukrainian: Людмила Юріївна Луснікова; born January 7, 1982, in Zaporizhia) is a Ukrainian judoka, who played for the extra-lightweight category (48 kg). At age eighteen, Lusnikova made her official debut at the 2000 Summer Olympics in Sydney, where she reached into the semi-final rounds, losing out to Japan's Ryoko Tani. She qualified for the repechage bout, after finding out that her previous opponent made further into the final round. In the second round of repechage bouts, Lusnikova was defeated by China's Zhao Shunxin, who scored a yuko to win a match at the closing time of four minutes.

Eight years after competing in her first Olympics, Lusnikova qualified for the second time in the women's 48 kg class at the 2008 Summer Olympics in Beijing. She defeated Tunisia's Chahnez M'barki in the first preliminary round, before losing out her next match, by a waza-ari (half-point) and a seoi nage (shoulder throw), to South Korea's Kim Young-Ran.
