= Alexei Cherchnev =

Russian judoka

Personal information
- Born: 18 December 1979 (age 46)
- Occupation: Judoka

Sport
- Country: Russia
- Sport: Judo
- Weight class: –81 kg

Achievements and titles
- European Champ.: 5th (2000)
Medal record
Men's judo
Representing Russia
World Juniors Championships
Gold medal – first place	1998 Cali	–81 kg
European Junior Championships
Bronze medal – third place	1997 Ljubljana	–78 kg

Profile at external databases
- JudoInside.com: 3322
- Updated on 10 January 2023

Alexei Cherchnev (born 18 December 1979) is a Russian judoka.

== Achievements ==
Year	Tournament	Place	Weight class
2000	European Judo Championships	5th	Half middleweight (81 kg)
