= Maarit Kallio =

Finnish judoka

Personal information
- Nationality: Finnish
- Born: 8 October 1975 (age 51) Hämeenlinna, Finland

Sport
- Sport: Judo

Maarit Kallio (born 8 October 1975) is a Finnish judoka. She competed in the women's extra-lightweight event at the 2000 Summer Olympics.
