= Tania Tallie =

South African judoka (born 1975)

Personal information
- Nationality: South African
- Born: 7 December 1975 (age 49); Cape Town, South Africa

Sport
- Sport: Judo

Tania Tallie (née D'Aguiar; born 7 December 1975) is a South African judoka. She competed in the women's extra-lightweight event at the 2000 Summer Olympics.

== Career ==
Tallie won bronze medals in the women's 48 kg category at the 1996 African Judo Championships and 1997 African Judo Championships. At the 2000 Olympic 48 kg competition, she was eliminated in the first round against Zhao Shunxin.

== Personal life ==
Tallie is married to Antonie Tallie. Her daughter is Tonet Tallie, who also competed in judo and was named to the South African team at the 2023 African Games in the sport of athletics.
