= Anatoli Droga =

Ukrainian judoka

Personal information
- Born: 26 January 1969 (age 57)
- Occupation: Judoka

Sport
- Sport: Judo

Profile at external databases
- JudoInside.com: 3163

Anatoli Droga (born 26 January 1969) is a Ukrainian judoka. He is currently a trainer of the Dnipro judo federation.

== Achievements ==
Year	Tournament	Place	Weight class
2000	European Judo Championships	7th	Half heavyweight (100 kg)
1995	Summer Universiade	5th	Half heavyweight (86 kg)
