= Fúlvio Miyata =

Brazilian judoka (born 1977)

Personal information
- Born: 4 May 1977 (age 49) São José dos Campos, São Paulo
Medal record
Men's judo
Representing Brazil
Pan American Judo Championships
Gold medal – first place	1996 San Juan	56 kg
Gold medal – first place	1998 Santo Domingo	60 kg
Bronze medal – third place	1997 Guadalajara	60 kg
World Championships
Bronze medal – third place	1997 Paris	60 kg
Military World Games
Bronze medal – third place	1999 Zagreb	60 kg

Fúlvio Miyata (born 4 May 1977) is a Brazilian judoka of Japanese origin.
