= Marko Sentić =

Croatian judoka (born 1976)

Marko Sentić (born 19 April 1976) is a Croatian judoka.

== Achievements ==
Year	Tournament	Place	Weight class
2000	European Judo Championships	7th	Lightweight (73 kg)

== See also ==
- List of judoka
- List of world champions in judo
- Judo in Croatia
