= Anna-Maria Gradante =

German judoka (born 1976)

Personal information
- Born: 26 December 1976 (age 49)
- Occupation: Judoka

Sport
- Country: Germany
- Sport: Judo
- Weight class: –48 kg

Achievements and titles
- Olympic Games: (bronze) (2000)
- World Champ.: (bronze) (1999)
- European Champ.: (silver) (1997)
Medal record
Women's judo
Representing Germany
Olympic Games
Bronze medal – third place	2000 Sydney	‍–‍48 kg
World Championships
Bronze medal – third place	1999 Birmingham	‍–‍48 kg
European Championships
Silver medal – second place	1997 Oostende	‍–‍48 kg
European Junior Championships
Silver medal – second place	1994 Lisbon	‍–‍48 kg

Profile at external databases
- IJF: 53077
- JudoInside.com: 233
- Updated on 1 June 2023

Anna-Maria Gradante (born 26 December 1976 in Remscheid) is a German judoka. She won a bronze medal in the extra-lightweight (‍–‍48 kg) division at the 2000 Summer Olympics, her last match being with Brazilian Mariana Martins.
