= Guilherme Bentes =

Portuguese judoka (born 1973)

Personal information
- Nationality: Portuguese
- Born: 10 June 1973 (age 53) Lisbon-Portugal
- Occupation: Qatar Airways Captain A350 Qatar Airways CRM Instructor
- Height: 5 ft 9 in (175 cm)

Sport
- Sport: Judo
- Retired: June 11, 2003
Medal record
Men's Judo
Representing Portugal
World Championships
Bronze medal – third place	1997 Paris	71 kg

Profile at external databases
- IJF: 2634
- JudoInside.com: 3232

Guilherme Frederico Feria Bentes (born 10 June 1973 in Lisbon) is a retired Portuguese judoka.

== Achievements ==
Year	Tournament	Place	Weight class
2001	European Judo Championship TEAMS	2nd	-81 kg
1998	European Judo Championships	7th	Lightweight (73 kg)
1997	World Judo Championships	3rd	Lightweight (71 kg)
1997	European Judo Championships	5th	Lightweight (71 kg)
1996	Summer Judo Olympics	17th	Lightweight(71 kg)
