= Michaela Vernerová =

Czech judoka

Personal information
- Nationality: Czech
- Born: 15 September 1973 (age 53) Slaný, Czechoslovakia

Sport
- Sport: Judo
Medal record
Representing Czech Republic
World Championships
Bronze medal – third place	1999 Birmingham	57 kg
European Championships
Silver medal – second place	1997 Oostend	61 kg
Bronze medal – third place	1999 Bratislava	57 kg
Bronze medal – third place	2000 Wroclaw	57 kg
Summer Universiade
Silver medal – second place	1999 Palma de Mallorca	57 kg
Bronze medal – third place	2001 Beijing	57 kg

Michaela Vernerová (born 15 September 1973), also known as Michaela Kvačková, is a Czech judoka. She competed at the 1996 Summer Olympics and the 2000 Summer Olympics.
