= Hayet Rouini =

Tunisian judoka (born 1981)

Personal information
- Nationality: Tunisian
- Born: 10 August 1981 (age 45)

Sport
- Sport: Judo

Hayet Rouini (born 10 August 1981) is a Tunisian judoka. She competed in the women's extra-lightweight event at the 2000 Summer Olympics.
