= Patrick van Kalken =

Dutch judoka (born 1975)

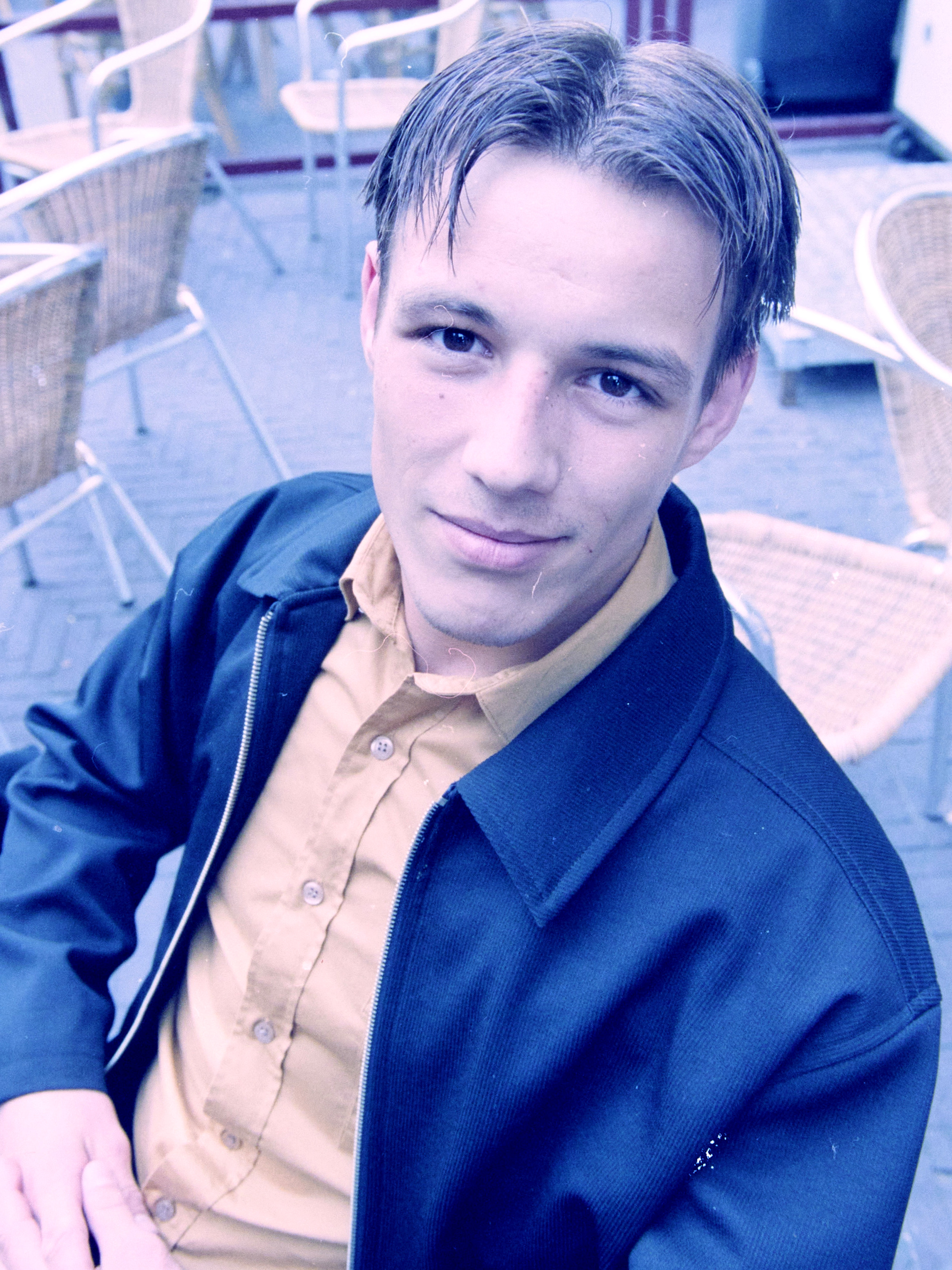
- van Kalken in 1998

Personal information
- Born: 29 September 1975 (age 51) Rotterdam, Netherlands
Medal record
Men's Judo
Representing the Netherlands
World Championships
Bronze medal – third place	1999 Birmingham	66 kg
European Championships
Gold medal – first place	2000 Wroclaw	66 kg
Bronze medal – third place	1998 Oviedo	66 kg

Patrick van Kalken (born 29 September 1975) is a Dutch judoka.

== Achievements ==
Year	Tournament	Place	Weight class
2000	Olympic Games	5th	Half lightweight (66 kg)
2000	European Judo Championships	1st	Half lightweight (66 kg)
1999	World Judo Championships	3rd	Half lightweight (66 kg)
1998	European Judo Championships	3rd	Half lightweight (66 kg)
