= Rafał Kozielewski =

Polish judoka

Medal record

Men's judo

European Championships
Bronze medal – third place	1998 Oviedo	73 kg

Rafał Kozielewski (born 15 April 1976 in Wrocław) is a Polish judoka.

== Achievements ==
Year	Tournament	Place	Weight class
1999	World Judo Championships	5th	Lightweight (73 kg)
1998	European Judo Championships	3rd	Lightweight (73 kg)
1997	European Judo Championships	5th	Lightweight (71 kg)
