= Galina Ataýewa =

Turkmenistan judoka (born 1971)

Personal information
- Born: 10 November 1971 (age 55)
- Occupation: Judoka

Sport
- Country: Turkmenistan
- Sport: Judo
- Weight class: ‍–‍48 kg

Achievements and titles
- Olympic Games: R16 (1996, 2000)
- World Champ.: R64 (1999)
- Asian Champ.: (bronze) (1995, 2000)
Medal record
Women's judo
Representing Turkmenistan
Asian Championships
Bronze medal – third place	1995 New Delhi	‍–‍48 kg
Bronze medal – third place	2000 Osaka	‍–‍48 kg

Profile at external databases
- IJF: 53089
- JudoInside.com: 3550
- Updated on 30 April 2025

Galina Ataýewa (born 10 November 1971) is a Turkmenistan judoka. She competed at the 1996 Summer Olympics and at the 2000 Summer Olympics.
