= 1997 World Judo Championships =

Judo competition

Judo 1997 World Judo Championships
- Venue: Accor Arena
- Location: Paris, France
- Dates: 9–12 October 1997
- Competitors: 585 from 91 nations

Competition at external databases
- Links: IJF • JudoInside

The 1997 World Judo Championships were the 20th edition of the World Judo Championships, and were held in Paris, France in 1997.

== Medal overview ==
=== Men ===
Event	Gold	Silver	Bronze
Extra-lightweight (60 kg)	Tadahiro Nomura (JPN)	Georgi Revazichvili (GEO)	Fúlvio Miyata (BRA)
Extra-lightweight (60 kg)	Tadahiro Nomura (JPN)	Georgi Revazichvili (GEO)	Cédric Taymans (BEL)
Half-lightweight (65 kg)	Kim Hyuk (KOR)	Larbi Benboudaoud (FRA)	Georgi Vazagashvili (GEO)
Half-lightweight (65 kg)	Kim Hyuk (KOR)	Larbi Benboudaoud (FRA)	Victor Bivol (MDA)
Lightweight (71 kg)	Kenzo Nakamura (JPN)	Christophe Gagliano (FRA)	Guilherme Bentes (POR)
Lightweight (71 kg)	Kenzo Nakamura (JPN)	Christophe Gagliano (FRA)	Vsevolods Zeļonijs (LAT)
Half-middleweight (78 kg)	Cho In-Chul (KOR)	Djamel Bouras (FRA)	Kwak Ok-Chol (PRK)
Half-middleweight (78 kg)	Cho In-Chul (KOR)	Djamel Bouras (FRA)	Patrick Reiter (AUT)
Middleweight (86 kg)	Jeon Ki-Young (KOR)	Marko Spittka (GER)	Brian Olson (USA)
Middleweight (86 kg)	Jeon Ki-Young (KOR)	Marko Spittka (GER)	Michele Monti (ITA)
Half-heavyweight (95 kg)	Paweł Nastula (POL)	Aurélio Miguel (BRA)	Ghislain Lemaire (FRA)
Half-heavyweight (95 kg)	Paweł Nastula (POL)	Aurélio Miguel (BRA)	Yoshio Nakamura (JPN)
Heavyweight (+95 kg)	David Douillet (FRA)	Shinichi Shinohara (JPN)	Pan Song (CHN)
Heavyweight (+95 kg)	David Douillet (FRA)	Shinichi Shinohara (JPN)	Tamerlan Tmenov (RUS)
Openweight	Rafał Kubacki (POL)	Yoshiharu Makishi (JPN)	Dennis van der Geest (NED)
Openweight	Rafał Kubacki (POL)	Yoshiharu Makishi (JPN)	Harry Van Barneveld (BEL)

=== Women ===
Event	Gold	Silver	Bronze
Extra-lightweight (48 kg)	Ryoko Tamura (JPN)	Amarilis Savón (CUB)	Monika Kurath (SUI)
Extra-lightweight (48 kg)	Ryoko Tamura (JPN)	Amarilis Savón (CUB)	Pae Dong-suk (PRK)
Half-lightweight (52 kg)	Marie-Claire Restoux (FRA)	Kye Sun-hui (PRK)	Hyun Sook-Hee (KOR)
Half-lightweight (52 kg)	Marie-Claire Restoux (FRA)	Kye Sun-hui (PRK)	Nicole Flagothier (BEL)
Lightweight (56 kg)	Isabel Fernández (ESP)	Driulis González (CUB)	Chiyori Tateno (JPN)
Lightweight (56 kg)	Isabel Fernández (ESP)	Driulis González (CUB)	Magali Baton (FRA)
Half-middleweight (61 kg)	Séverine Vandenhende (FRA)	Gella Vandecaveye (BEL)	Sara Álvarez (ESP)
Half-middleweight (61 kg)	Séverine Vandenhende (FRA)	Gella Vandecaveye (BEL)	Jung Sung-Sook (KOR)
Middleweight (66 kg)	Kate Howey (GBR)	Anja von Rekowski (GER)	Emanuela Pierantozzi (ITA)
Middleweight (66 kg)	Kate Howey (GBR)	Anja von Rekowski (GER)	Cho Min-Sun (KOR)
Half-heavyweight (72 kg)	Noriko Anno (JPN)	Diadenis Luna (CUB)	Edinanci Silva (BRA)
Half-heavyweight (72 kg)	Noriko Anno (JPN)	Diadenis Luna (CUB)	Ulla Werbrouck (BEL)
Heavyweight (+72 kg)	Christine Cicot (FRA)	Miho Ninomiya (JPN)	Beata Maksymow (POL)
Heavyweight (+72 kg)	Christine Cicot (FRA)	Miho Ninomiya (JPN)	Sun Fuming (CHN)
Openweight	Daima Beltrán (CUB)	Raquel Barrientos (ESP)	Miho Ninomiya (JPN)
Openweight	Daima Beltrán (CUB)	Raquel Barrientos (ESP)	Yuan Hua (CHN)

=== Medal table ===
Rank	Nation	Gold	Silver	Bronze	Total
1	Japan	4	3	3	10
2	France	4	3	2	9
3	South Korea	3	0	3	6
4	Poland	2	0	1	3
5	Cuba	1	3	0	4
6	Spain	1	1	1	3
7	Great Britain	1	0	0	1
8	Germany	0	2	0	2
9	Belgium	0	1	4	5
10	Brazil	0	1	2	3
10	North Korea	0	1	2	3
12	Georgia	0	1	1	2
13	China	0	0	3	3
14	Italy	0	0	2	2
15	Austria	0	0	1	1
15	Latvia	0	0	1	1
15	Moldova	0	0	1	1
15	Netherlands	0	0	1	1
15	Portugal	0	0	1	1
15	Russia	0	0	1	1
15	Switzerland	0	0	1	1
15	United States	0	0	1	1
Totals (22 entries)		16	16	32	64

== Results overview ==
=== Men ===
==== 60 kg ====
Position	Judoka	Country
1.	Tadahiro Nomura	Japan
2.	Georgi Revazichvili	Georgia
3.	Fúlvio Miyata	Brazil
3.	Cédric Taymans	Belgium
5.	Kang Myong-Chang	North Korea
5.	Yacine Douma	France
7.	Samuel Dunkley	Great Britain
7.	Nikolai Ojeguine	Russia

==== 65 kg ====
Position	Judoka	Country
1.	Kim Hyuk	South Korea
2.	Larbi Benboudaoud	France
3.	Georgi Vazagashvili	Georgia
3.	Victor Bivol	Moldova
5.	Israel Hernández	Cuba
5.	Magomed Dzhafarov	Russia
7.	Henrique Guimarães	Brazil
7.	Amar Meridja	Algeria

==== 71 kg ====
Position	Judoka	Country
1.	Kenzo Nakamura	Japan
2.	Christophe Gagliano	France
3.	Guilherme Bentes	Portugal
3.	Vsevolods Zeļonijs	Latvia
5.	Jorma Korhonen	Finland
5.	Khaliuny Boldbaatar	Mongolia
7.	Koen van Nol	Netherlands
7.	Illya Chymchyuri	Ukraine

==== 78 kg ====
Position	Judoka	Country
1.	Cho In-Chul	South Korea
2.	Djamel Bouras	France
3.	Kwak Ok-Chol	North Korea
3.	Patrick Reiter	Austria
5.	Yu Zhijan	China
5.	Graeme Randall	Great Britain
7.	Alvaro Paseyro	Uruguay
7.	Flávio Canto	Brazil

==== 86 kg ====
Position	Judoka	Country
1.	Jeon Ki-Young	South Korea
2.	Marko Spittka	Germany
3.	Brian Olson	United States
3.	Michele Monti	Italy
5.	Algimantas Merkevičius	Lithuania
5.	Ruslan Mashurenko	Ukraine
7.	Hiroomi Fujita	Japan
7.	Keith Morgan	Canada

==== 95 kg ====
Position	Judoka	Country
1.	Paweł Nastula	Poland
2.	Aurélio Miguel	Brazil
3.	Ghislain Lemaire	France
3.	Yoshio Nakamura	Japan
5.	Daniel Gürschner	Germany
5.	Radu Ivan	Romania
7.	Dano Pantić	Yugoslavia
7.	Ariel Ze'evi	Israel

==== +95 kg ====
Position	Judoka	Country
1.	David Douillet	France
2.	Shinichi Shinohara	Japan
3.	Pan Song	China
3.	Tamerlan Tmenov	Russia
5.	Selim Tataroğlu	Turkey
5.	Seyed Mahmoudreza Miran	Iran
7.	Rafał Kubacki	Poland
7.	Ernesto Pérez	Spain

==== Open class ====
Position	Judoka	Country
1.	Rafał Kubacki	Poland
2.	Yoshiharu Makishi	Japan
3.	Harry Van Barneveld	Belgium
3.	Dennis van der Geest	Netherlands
5.	Sergey Kossorotov	Russia
5.	Pan Song	China
7.	Vladimir Sánchez	Cuba
7.	Aurélio Miguel	Brazil

=== Women ===
==== 48 kg ====
Position	Judoka	Country
1.	Ryoko Tamura	Japan
2.	Amarilis Savón	Cuba
3.	Monika Kurath	Switzerland
3.	Pae Dong-suk	North Korea
5.	Justina Pinheiro	Portugal
5.	Sylvie Meloux	France
7.	Tatiana Moskvina	Belarus
7.	Joyce Heron	Great Britain

==== 52 kg ====
Position	Judoka	Country
1.	Marie-Claire Restoux	France
2.	Kye Sun-hui	North Korea
3.	Hyun Sook-Hee	South Korea
3.	Nicole Flagothier	Belgium
5.	Luce Baillargeon	Canada
5.	Isabelle Schmutz	Switzerland
7.	Legna Verdecia	Cuba
7.	Tang Lihong	China

==== 56 kg ====
Position	Judoka	Country
1.	Isabel Fernández	Spain
2.	Driulis González	Cuba
3.	Chiyori Tateno	Japan
3.	Magali Baton	France
5.	Deborah Allan	Great Britain
5.	Marisabel Lomba	Belgium
7.	Daniella Zangrando	Brazil
7.	Pernilla Andersson	Sweden

==== 61 kg ====
Position	Judoka	Country
1.	Séverine Vandenhende	France
2.	Gella Vandecaveye	Belgium
3.	Sara Álvarez	Spain
3.	Jung Sung-Sook	South Korea
5.	Michelle Buckingham	Canada
5.	Lara Sullivan	Australia
7.	Alla Klymovych	Ukraine
7.	Hiroko Kitazume	Japan

==== 66 kg ====
Position	Judoka	Country
1.	Kate Howey	Great Britain
2.	Anja von Rekowski	Germany
3.	Emanuela Pierantozzi	Italy
3.	Cho Min-Sun	South Korea
5.	Úrsula Martín	Spain
5.	Isabelle Beauruelle	France
7.	Edith Bosch	Netherlands
7.	Silvia Henriques	Brazil

==== 72 kg ====
Position	Judoka	Country
1.	Noriko Anno	Japan
2.	Diadenis Luna	Cuba
3.	Edinanci Silva	Brazil
3.	Ulla Werbrouck	Belgium
5.	Estha Essombe	France
5.	Ylenia Scapin	Italy
7.	Karin Kienhuis	Netherlands
7.	Simona Richter	Romania

==== +72 kg ====
Position	Judoka	Country
1.	Christine Cicot	France
2.	Miho Ninomiya	Japan
3.	Beata Maksymow	Poland
3.	Sun Fuming	China
5.	Daima Beltrán	Cuba
5.	Michelle Rogers	Great Britain
7.	Brigitte Olivier	Belgium
7.	Sandra Köppen	Germany

==== Open class ====
Position	Judoka	Country
1.	Daima Beltrán	Cuba
2.	Raquel Barrientos	Spain
3.	Miho Ninomiya	Japan
3.	Yuan Hua	China
5.	Céline Lebrun	France
5.	Françoise Harteveld	Netherlands
7.	Lee Hyun-Keong	South Korea
7.	Mara Kovačević	Yugoslavia
