= Miho Ninomiya =

Japanese judoka (born 1975)

Personal information
- Born: 22 August 1975 (age 50)
- Occupation: Judoka

Sport
- Sport: Judo
Medal record
Representing Japan
Women's Judo
World Championships
Silver medal – second place	1997 Paris	+72 kg
Silver medal – second place	1999 Birmingham	Open
Bronze medal – third place	1997 Paris	Open
Bronze medal – third place	1999 Birmingham	+78 kg
Asian Games
Bronze medal – third place	1998 Bangkok	+78 kg

Profile at external databases
- IJF: 58974
- JudoInside.com: 1037

Miho Ninomiya (二宮 美穂, Ninomiya Miho; born August 22, 1975 in Kikuchi District, Kumamoto) is a female Japanese judoka. She started Judo at the age of 14. She won All-Japan judo championships 2 times（1997–1998. She has also won silver and bronze medals at the 1997 and 1999 World Judo Championships. However, she was defeated at the Olympic trials so she could not participate in the 2000 Olympics.
