= Natik Bagirov =

Belarusian judoka (born 1964)

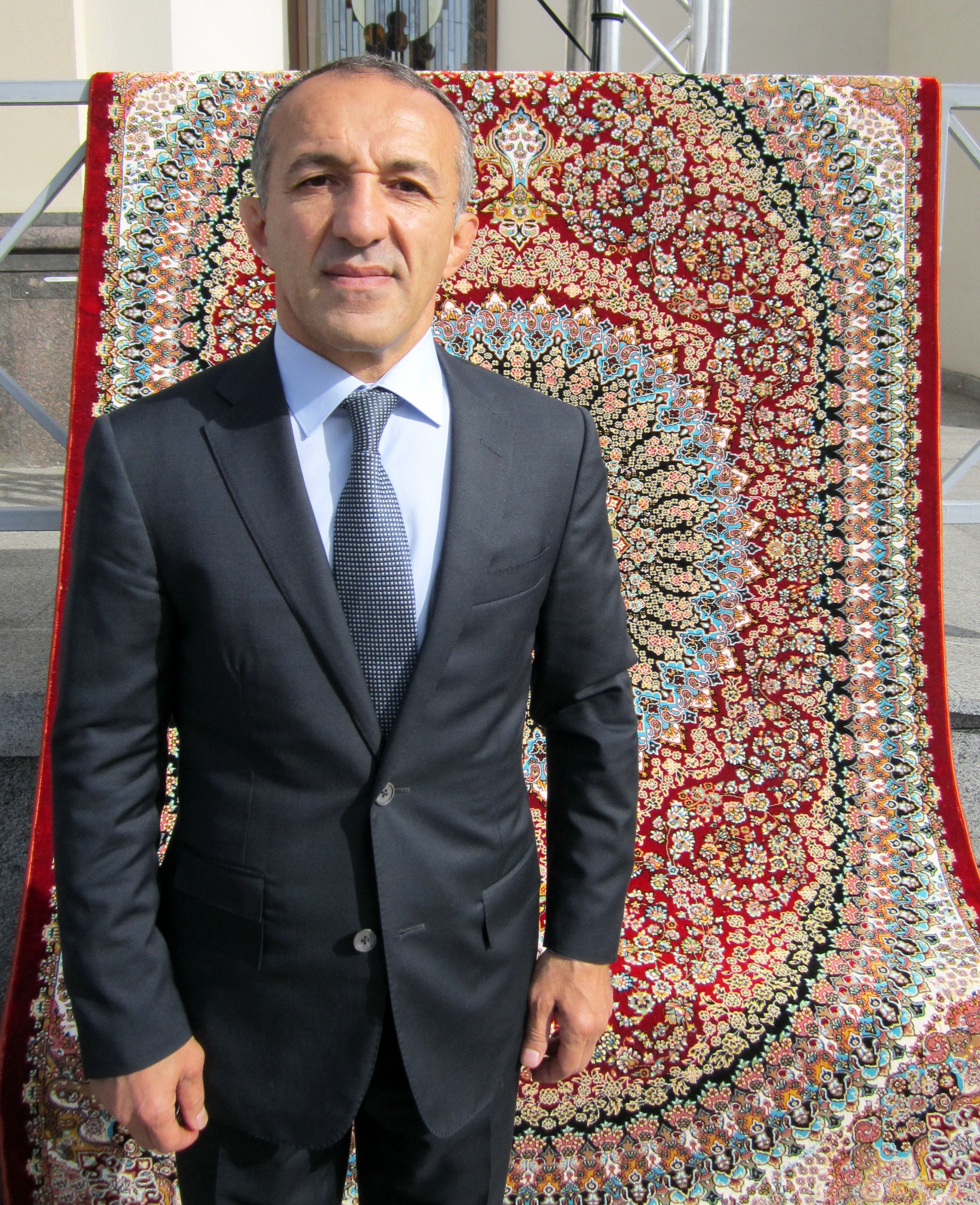

Personal information
- Born: 7 September 1964 (age 61)
- Occupation: Judoka

Sport
- Sport: Judo
Medal record
Men's Judo
Representing Belarus
World Championships
Bronze medal – third place	1995 Chiba	60 kg
Bronze medal – third place	1999 Birmingham	60 kg
European Championships
Bronze medal – third place	1995 Birmingham	60 kg
Bronze medal – third place	1999 Bratislava	60 kg

Profile at external databases
- JudoInside.com: 7719

Natik Bagirov (Azerbaijani: Natiq Bağırov; Belarusian: Націк Багіраў, born 7 September 1964) is an ethnic Azerbaijani judoka from Belarus.

== Achievements ==
Year	Tournament	Place	Weight class
1999	World Judo Championships	3rd	Extra lightweight (60 kg)
1999	European Judo Championships	3rd	Extra lightweight (60 kg)
1996	Olympic Games	5th	Extra lightweight (60 kg)
1996	European Judo Championships	5th	Extra lightweight (60 kg)
1995	World Judo Championships	3rd	Extra lightweight (60 kg)
1995	European Judo Championships	3rd	Extra lightweight (60 kg)
