= Giorgi Revazishvili (judoka) =

Georgian judoka (born 1974)

Personal information
- Born: 16 November 1974 (age 51)
- Occupation: Judoka

Sport
- Sport: Judo
Medal record
Men's judo
Representing Georgia
World Championships
Silver medal – second place	1997 Paris	60 kg
Bronze medal – third place	1999 Birmingham	60 kg
European Championships
Gold medal – first place	1996 The Hague	65 kg
Silver medal – second place	1997 Ostend	65 kg
Bronze medal – third place	1994 Gdansk	60 kg
Bronze medal – third place	1998 Oviedo	66 kg
Bronze medal – third place	2000 Wroclaw	73 kg
Teams World Championships
Silver medal – second place	2002 Basel	Teams
Teams European Championships
Gold medal – first place	2003 London	Teams
Bronze medal – third place	1996 St. Petersburg	Teams

Profile at external databases
- JudoInside.com: 408

Giorgi Revazishvili (Georgian: გიორგი რევაზიშვილი; born 16 November 1974) is a Georgian judoka. He was arrested and convicted on the charges of extortion of USD 8,000 from Greek businessman in Tbilisi.

After the court passed decision to imprison the perpetrators their friends, mainly wrestlers and relatives, destroyed the court hall and blocked the central Rustaveli Avenue inTbilisi. Riot police was deployed to the streets first time since the "Rose revolution" and police dispersed the demonstration. The arrests of the wrestlers resulted in protests by other sportsmen. Some of them even refused to take part in preparatory training for the World Championship in wrestling. Nestor Khergiani, two time champion of Europe in judo, stated: “We are not going to wrestle! Let the government officials wrestle instead of us”.

Later on, Zviad Zviadauri, Olympic champion in Judo and Dilar Khabuliani, former Minister of Interior and president of Judo Federation, apologized to the President Saakashvili for the riots.

== Achievements ==
Year	Tournament	Place	Weight class
2002	European Judo Championships	5th	Half lightweight (66 kg)
2000	European Judo Championships	3rd	Lightweight (73 kg)
1999	World Judo Championships	3rd	Extra lightweight (60 kg)
1999	European Judo Championships	5th	Half lightweight (66 kg)
1998	European Judo Championships	3rd	Half lightweight (66 kg)
1997	World Judo Championships	2nd	Extra lightweight (60 kg)
1997	European Judo Championships	2nd	Half lightweight (65 kg)
1996	Olympic Games	7th	Half lightweight (65 kg)
1996	European Judo Championships	1st	Half lightweight (65 kg)
1994	European Judo Championships	3rd	Extra lightweight (60 kg)
