= Sara Álvarez =

Spanish Olympic judoka

Personal information
- Born: 10 July 1975 (age 50)
- Occupation: Judoka

Sport
- Country: Spain
- Sport: Judo
- Weight class: –61 kg, –63 kg

Achievements and titles
- Olympic Games: 7th (1996)
- World Champ.: (silver) (2001)
- European Champ.: (gold) (2003, 2004)
Medal record
Women's judo
Representing Spain
World Championships
Silver medal – second place	2001 Munich	–63 kg
Bronze medal – third place	1997 Paris	–61 kg
Bronze medal – third place	1999 Birmingham	–63 kg
European Championships
Gold medal – first place	2003 Düsseldorf	–63 kg
Gold medal – first place	2004 Bucharest	–63 kg
Silver medal – second place	1998 Oviedo	–63 kg
Bronze medal – third place	1999 Bratislava	–63 kg
Bronze medal – third place	2000 Wrocław	–63 kg
European Junior Championships
Gold medal – first place	1993 Arnhem	–61 kg
Bronze medal – third place	1992 Jerusalem	–61 kg

Profile at external databases
- IJF: 52963
- JudoInside.com: 614
- Updated on 19 November 2022

Sara Yaneisy Álvarez Menéndez (born 10 July 1975) is a Spanish former judoka who competed in the 1996 Summer Olympics, in the 2000 Summer Olympics, and in the 2004 Summer Olympics.
