= Tsvetana Bozhilova =

Bulgarian judoka (born 1968)

Personal information
- Born: 19 October 1968 (age 58) Pazardzhik, Bulgaria
- Occupation: Judoka

Sport
- Country: Bulgaria
- Sport: Judo
- Weight class: +78 kg

Achievements and titles
- Olympic Games: R32 (2000, 2004)
- World Champ.: (bronze) (1999)
- European Champ.: (silver) (1999)
Medal record
Women's judo
Representing Bulgaria
World Championships
Bronze medal – third place	1999 Birmingham	Open
European Championships
Silver medal – second place	1999 Bratislava	+78 kg
Bronze medal – third place	1988 Pamplona	Open
Bronze medal – third place	1990 Frankfurt	Open
Bronze medal – third place	1995 Birmingham	Open
Bronze medal – third place	2000 Wrocław	Open
Bronze medal – third place	2003 Düsseldorf	Open
Bronze medal – third place	2004 Bucharest	+78 kg

Profile at external databases
- IJF: 10334
- JudoInside.com: 733
- Updated on 19 November 2022

Tsvetana Bozhilova (Bulgarian: Цветана Божилова) (born 19 October 1968) is a Bulgarian judoka.

== Achievements ==
Year	Tournament	Place	Weight class
2008	European Championships	7th	Heavyweight (+78 kg)
2005	World Championships	7th	Open class
2004	European Championships	3rd	Heavyweight (+78 kg)
2003	European Championships	3rd	Heavyweight (+78 kg)
2002	European Championships	5th	Heavyweight (+78 kg)
2002	European Championships	7th	Open class
2001	World Championships	7th	Heavyweight (+78 kg)
2000	European Championships	5th	Heavyweight (+78 kg)
2000	European Championships	3rd	Open class
1999	World Championships	7th	Heavyweight (+78 kg)
1999	World Championships	3rd	Open class
1999	European Championships	2nd	Heavyweight (+78 kg)
1999	European Championships	7th	Open class
1996	European Championships	7th	Open class
1995	European Championships	7th	Heavyweight (+72 kg)
1995	European Championships	3rd	Open class
