= Éric Despezelle =

French judoka (born 1974)

Medal record

Men's judo

Representing France

European Judo Championships
Silver medal – second place	2000 Wroclaw	60 kg

Éric Despezelle (born 22 December 1974) is a French judoka.

== Achievements ==
Year	Tournament	Place	Weight class
2000	European Judo Championships	2nd	Extra lightweight (60 kg)
1999	European Judo Championships	7th	Extra lightweight (60 kg)
1997	Mediterranean Games	3rd	Extra lightweight (60 kg)
