= Victor Florescu =

Moldovan judoka

Personal information
- Nationality: Moldovan
- Born: 9 October 1973 (age 52)
- Occupation: Judoka

Sport
- Sport: Judo
Medal record
Representing Moldova
Men's judo
World Championships
Silver medal – second place	1999 Birmingham	90 kg

Profile at external databases
- JudoInside.com: 10564

Victor Florescu (born 5 October 1973) is a Moldovan judoka in the -90 kg category. He was at the 2000 Summer Olympics where he was defeated by Jean-Claude Raphael and won a silver medal at the 1999 World Judo Championships. He obtained the best result for Moldova at the world championships in judo to date.

== Achievements ==
Year	Tournament	Place	Weight class
1999	World Judo Championships	2nd	Middleweight (90 kg)
