= Judo at the 1999 Pan American Games =

Judo Judo at the 1999 Pan American Games
- Location: Winnipeg, Manitoba, Canada
- Dates: 2–5 August 1999

Competition at external databases
- Links: JudoInside

This page shows the results of the Judo Competition for men and women at the 1999 Pan American Games, held from 2 to 5 August, 1999 in Winnipeg, Manitoba, Canada. There were seven weight divisions.

== Medal table ==
Place	Nation	Gold medal	Silver medal	Bronze medal	Total
1	Cuba	9	1	4	14
2	United States	2	2	5	9
3	Brazil	1	3	6	10
4	Argentina	1	2	4	7
5	Canada	1	1	4	6
6	Venezuela	0	3	1	4
7	Puerto Rico	0	2	0	2
8	Dominican Republic	0	0	2	2
9	Ecuador	0	0	1	1
9	Mexico	0	0	1	1
Total		14	14	28	56

== Men's competition ==
=== Men's Extra-Lightweight (-60 kg) ===
RANK	NAME JUDOKA
	Manolo Poulot (CUB)
	Denílson Lourenço (BRA)
	Juan Jacinto Jiménez (DOM)
	Jorge Lencina (ARG)

=== Men's Half-Lightweight (-66 kg) ===
RANK	NAME JUDOKA
	Martin Ríos (ARG)
	Ludwig Ortíz (VEN)
	Yordanis Arencibia (CUB)
	Alex Ottiano (USA)

=== Men's Lightweight (-73 kg) ===
RANK	NAME JUDOKA
	James Pedro (USA)
	Carlos Méndez (PUR)
	Israel Hernández (CUB)
	Sebastian Pereira (BRA)

=== Men's Half-Middleweight (-81 kg) ===
RANK	NAME JUDOKA
	Gabriel Arteaga (CUB)
	Flávio Canto (BRA)
	Dario García (ARG)
	Maxime Roberge (CAN)

=== Men's Middleweight (-90 kg) ===
RANK	NAME JUDOKA
	Brian Olson (USA)
	Eduardo Costa (ARG)
	Yosvany Despaigne (CUB)
	Keith Morgan (CAN)

=== Men's Half-Heavyweight (-100 kg) ===
RANK	NAME JUDOKA
	Nicolas Gill (CAN)
	Yosvani Kessel (CUB)
	Marcelo Figueiredo (BRA)
	Ato Hand (USA)

=== Men's Heavyweight (+100 kg) ===
RANK	NAME JUDOKA
	Ángel Sánchez (CUB)
	Daniel Hernandes (BRA)
	Orlando Baccino (ARG)
	Douglas Cardozo (VEN)

== Women's competition ==
=== Women's Extra-Lightweight (-48 kg) ===
RANK	NAME JUDOKA
	Amarilis Savón (CUB)
	Roselys Guacaran (VEN)
	Adriana Angeles (MEX)
	Lauren Meece (USA)

=== Women's Half-Lightweight (-52 kg) ===
RANK	NAME JUDOKA
	Legna Verdecia (CUB)
	Carolina Mariani (ARG)
	Luce Baillargeon (CAN)
	Fabiane Hukuda (BRA)

=== Women's Lightweight (-57 kg) ===
RANK	NAME JUDOKA
	Driulis González (CUB)
	Roxana García (PUR)
	Brigitte Lastrade (CAN)
	Danielle Zangrando (BRA)

=== Women's Half-Middleweight (-63 kg) ===
RANK	NAME JUDOKA
	Vania Ishii (BRA)
	Celita Schutz (USA)
	Kenia Rodríguez (CUB)
	Eleucadia Vargas (DOM)

=== Women's Middleweight (-70 kg) ===
RANK	NAME JUDOKA
	Sibelis Veranes (CUB)
	Xiomara Griffith (VEN)
	Sandra Bacher (USA)
	Lorena Briceño (ARG)

=== Women's Half-Heavyweight (-78 kg) ===
RANK	NAME JUDOKA
	Diadenis Luna (CUB)
	Niki Jenkins (CAN)
	Edinanci Silva (BRA)
	Amy Tong (USA)

=== Women's Heavyweight (+78 kg) ===
RANK	NAME JUDOKA
	Daima Beltrán (CUB)
	Colleen Rosensteel (USA)
	Carmen Chala (ECU)
	Priscila Marques (BRA)
