= Jérôme Dreyfus =

French judoka (born 1971)

Jérôme Dreyfus (born 9 April 1971) is a French judoka.

== Achievements ==
Year	Tournament	Place	Weight class
2001	European Judo Championships	5th	Heavyweight (+100 kg)
2001	European Judo Championships	7th	Open class
2000	European Judo Championships	5th	Open class
1999	World Judo Championships	5th	Heavyweight (+100 kg)
1999	European Judo Championships	5th	Heavyweight (+100 kg)
1995	Universiade	2nd	Open class
1993	European Judo Championships	5th	Open class
1993	Mediterranean Games	1st	Heavyweight (+95 kg)
