= Martín Ríos (judoka) =

Argentinian judoka (born 1978)

Personal information
- Born: 7 July 1978 (age 47) Rosario, Santa Fe, Argentina

Sport
- Sport: Judo
Medal record
Representing Argentina
Pan American Games
Gold medal – first place	1999 Winnipeg	Half-lightweight

Martín Miguel Ríos (born 7 July 1978) is an Argentine judoka. He competed in the men's half-lightweight event at the 2000 Summer Olympics.
