= David Moret =

Swiss judoka (born 1979)

Personal information
- Born: 1 April 1979 (age 47)
- Occupation: Judoka

Sport
- Sport: Judo

Profile at external databases
- JudoInside.com: 3871

David Moret (born April 1, 1979) is a Swiss judoka.

== Achievements ==
Year	Tournament	Place	Weight class
2000	European Judo Championships	7th	Extra lightweight (60 kg)
1999	European Judo Championships	7th	Extra lightweight (60 kg)
