= Vardan Voskanyan =

Armenian Olympic judoka

Personal information
- Born: 1 January 1972 (age 54)
- Occupation: Judoka

Sport
- Sport: Judo

Profile at external databases
- JudoInside.com: 7362

Vardan Voskanyan (Armenian: Վարդան Ոսկանյան, born 1 January 1972 in Yerevan, Armenian SSR) is an Armenian judoka. He competed at the 2000 Summer Olympics.

== Achievements ==
Year	Tournament	Place	Weight class
2000	European Judo Championships	7th	Extra lightweight (60 kg)
1999	World Judo Championships	7th	Extra lightweight (60 kg)
