= Kwak Ok-chol =

North Korean judoka (born 1973)

Medal record

Men's judo

Representing North Korea

World Championships
Bronze medal – third place	1997 Paris	78 kg
Bronze medal – third place	1999 Birmingham	–81 kg

- Kwak Ok-chol
- Hangul: 곽옥철
- RR: Gwak Okcheol
- MR: Kwak Okch'ŏl

Kwak Ok-chol (born 6 February 1973) is a North Korean former judoka who competed in the 2000 Summer Olympics.
