= Lauren Meece =

American Olympic judoka

Personal information
- Born: 6 February 1983 (age 43) Hollywood, Los Angeles, United States

Sport
- Sport: Judo
Medal record
Representing United States
Pan American Games
Bronze medal – third place	1999 Winnipeg	Lightweight

Lauren Michele Meece (born 6 February 1983) is an American former judoka who competed in the 2000 Summer Olympics. In an editorial about LGBT Olympians being out at the Olympics she stated that athletes should be allowed to focus on their sports goals without having to be role models. She came out after her competition.
