= Isabelle Schmutz =

Swiss judoka

Personal information
- Nationality: Swiss
- Born: 12 February 1971 (age 55)

Sport
- Sport: Judo

Isabelle Schmutz (born 12 February 1971) is a Swiss judoka. She competed at the 1996 Summer Olympics and the 2000 Summer Olympics.
