= Ryoko Tani =

Japanese politician and retired judoka

- 谷 亮子
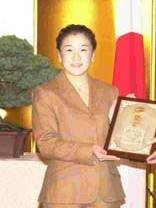
- Tani in 2000

Member of the House of Councillors
- In office 26 July 2010 – 10 July 2016
- Constituency: National PR

Personal details
- Born: Ryoko Tamura (田村 亮子, Tamura Ryōko); 6 September 1975 (age 51) Higashi, Fukuoka, Japan
- Party: People's Life (2013–2016)
- Other political affiliations: Democratic (2010–2012); People's Life First (2012); Tomorrow (2012–2013)
- Height: 1.46 m (4 ft 9 in)
- Spouse: Yoshitomo Tani (m. 2003)
- Children: 2
- Education: Teikyo University; Nippon Sport Science University
- Nickname(s): Yawara-chan, Tawara
- Judo career
- Country: Japan
- Weight class: –48 kg

Judo achievements and titles
- Olympic Games: (gold) (2000, 2004)
- World Champ.: (gold) (1993, 1995, 1997, 1999, 2001, 2003, 2007)
- Asian Champ.: (gold) (1994)
Medal record
Women's judo
Representing Japan
Olympic Games
Gold medal – first place	2000 Sydney	‍–‍48 kg
Gold medal – first place	2004 Athens	‍–‍48 kg
Silver medal – second place	1992 Barcelona	‍–‍48 kg
Silver medal – second place	1996 Atlanta	‍–‍48 kg
Bronze medal – third place	2008 Beijing	‍–‍48 kg
World Championships
Gold medal – first place	1993 Hamilton	‍–‍48 kg
Gold medal – first place	1995 Chiba	‍–‍48 kg
Gold medal – first place	1997 Paris	‍–‍48 kg
Gold medal – first place	1999 Birmingham	‍–‍48 kg
Gold medal – first place	2001 Munich	‍–‍48 kg
Gold medal – first place	2003 Osaka	‍–‍48 kg
Gold medal – first place	2007 Rio de Janeiro	‍–‍48 kg
Bronze medal – third place	1991 Barcelona	‍–‍48 kg
Asian Games
Gold medal – first place	1994 Hiroshima	‍–‍48 kg
Asian Championships
Bronze medal – third place	1991 Osaka	‍–‍48 kg
Summer Universiade
Gold medal – first place	1995 Fukuoka	‍–‍48 kg

Profile at external judo databases
- IJF: 52630
- JudoInside.com: 2970
- Updated on 30 May 2023

Ryoko Tani (谷 亮子, Tani Ryōko; née Tamura (田村), born September 6, 1975) is a Japanese politician and retired female judoka.

Competing in the extra-lightweight (48 kg) class, she won a record seven world titles and five Olympic medals including two golds at Sydney 2000 and Athens 2004. After her retirement, the International Judo Federation named her "best female judoka ever".

In 2010, she was elected to the House of Councillors, the upper house of the Japanese parliament.

== Early and personal life ==
Ryoko Tamura was born in Higashi-ku, Fukuoka on September 6, 1975. She started judo at the age of seven.

She studied literature at Teikyo University and joined Toyota in 1998.

In 2003, she married Yoshitomo Tani, an Olympian and professional baseball player then with Orix BlueWave. The wedding reception reportedly cost $3 million. The couple have two sons, born in 2005 and 2009.

== Sporting career ==
Standing at 1.46 m (4 ft 9 in), Tani fought in the extra-lightweight (48 kg) division her whole career and, unlike many of her opponents, she never had to cut weight before a competition.

Her first major title was at the 1990 Fukuoka International Women's Judo Championships, a tournament she went on to win 13 years in a row.

In 1993, she won her first world title and received her fourth dan. She went on to win the biennial world championships in 1995, 1997, 1999, 2001, 2003 and 2007. She did not compete in 2005 as she was expecting her first child. This record seven wins was only beaten by French judoka Teddy Riner in 2015, in an era when world championships had become annual events.

She competed in five Olympic Games and won as many medals. At Barcelona 1992, aged only 16 years old, she defeated in the semi-final veteran British fighter and 4-time world champion Karen Briggs, but she lost the final by a small margin against the reigning world champion, Cécile Nowak of France. This was followed by a 4-year, 84-match winning streak that led her to her second Olympic final at Atlanta 1996. Tani was the clear favorite against the relatively unknown North-Korean Kye Sun Hui, but she was unable to live up to the expectations. Kye resisted all her attacks and scored an advantage towards the end of the fight. Tani's second Olympic silver was a huge setback, and the Japanese media talked of an "Olympic curse". Reflecting on this years later, Tani said, "there was never a curse … in 1992, I was 16, I was lacking experience … in 1996, I was 20".

After 1996, she remained unbeaten for 12 years. At Sydney 2000, she had a tough semi-final against North Korea's Cha Hyon-hyang, but she left no chance to her opponent in the final, Lyubov Bruletova of Russia. After only 36 seconds, Tani delivered an uchi mata (inner-thigh throw) and was awarded an ippon and the gold medal. Four years later in Athens, she scored a series of ippon-victories to reach the final, in which she dominated France's Frédérique Jossinet, taking an early koka lead that she confirmed with a waza-ari in the last seconds of the fight. She was the first woman judoka to win two Olympic golds.

Tani lost the 2007 All-Japan Weight Class Judo Championship, which doubles as the qualifier for Olympics and the World Championships on those years when the events take place, but was selected as Japan's representative anyway by the All Japan Judo Federation (AJJF). She then won the gold medal in the Rio de Janeiro World Championships. Tani lost the All-Japan again in April 2008, to 21-year-old Emi Yamagishi. Again, the AJJF selected Tani for Japan's team in place of Yamagishi. The AJJF refused to answer questions about Tani's selection after the decision, but later said that Tani was selected because "She is especially strong against international opponents". The selection prompted Philip Brasor, media commentator for the Japan Times to ask "...maybe Tani is the better choice, but why have qualifying bouts in the first place?". The AJFF uses qualifying bouts as only one criterion considered for selection, with performance in international events as another.

In Beijing in 2008, she saw her hopes of a third-straight gold evaporate when judges awarded penalty points to Romania's Alina Dumitru after both competitors failed to show much aggression. Looking stunned, Tani fought desperately after the final controversial penalty call, but with only seconds left she had no time to mount an attack. She defeated Russia's Lyudmila Bogdanova for bronze.

She retired from competition in 2010. In a career spanning around 20 years, she was only defeated 5 times. In 2011, the International Judo Federation named her "best female judoka ever" at its 60th anniversary gala in Paris.

== Popularity and legacy ==
Tani followed in the footsteps of Kaori Yamaguchi, who in 1984 had become the first Japanese woman to ever win a world championship – the sport had long been a male preserve. Yamaguchi was the inspiration for the character of Yawara Inokuma, the heroine of Naoki Urasawa's popular manga and anime series Yawara! who prepares for the 1992 Barcelona Olympics. When Tani represented Japan in Barcelona, she was viewed by the Japanese public as a real-life Yawara and was soon nicknamed Yawara-chan or Tawara.

Thanks to her success and cheerful personality, Tani grew immensely popular in Japan. She appeared in numerous TV commercials and her wedding ceremony, broadcast live on Japanese television, was followed by 20 million spectators. The birth of her first child also became a major press event, with camera crews waiting for the first glimpse of her emergence from the hospital. The characters of Ryoko Izumo and Ryoko Kano from the World Heroes and Fighter's History fighting video games series, respectively, were both loosely based on her.

Tani is credited for the boom in women's judo witnessed by Japan in the 1990s, leading to the rise of a new generation of competitors. Because she did not let her marriage put an end to her sporting career, and won her last world title as a young mother, she is also viewed as a symbol of the changing role of women in Japanese society.

== Political career ==
Tani was introduced to politics by Ichiro Ozawa. On May 10, 2010 the Democratic Party announced that she would represent the party as a proportional candidate in the Summer 2010 House of Councillors election. Tani initially stated that she still intended to pursue her judo career, but she eventually retired from judo after she won the seat in question.

In July 2012, she left the Democratic Party for the newly created and short-lived People's Life First. Later that same year, she was one of the founding members of the People's Life Party, alongside her mentor Ichiro Ozawa. Tani was approached by several parties in the lead up to the July 2016 election, but Ozawa demanded she remain with the party, as her defection would have meant the party fell below the minimum requirement of five Diet members and lost its official party status. In June 2016 Tani announced her decision to remain with the party until the election, but not seek a second term.

== See also ==
- List of multiple Olympic medalists in one event
- List of multiple Summer Olympic medalists

Olympic Games
Preceded by Kumi Nakada	Flagbearer for Japan; 1996 Atlanta	Succeeded by Kosei Inoue
