= Eszter Csizmadia =

Hungarian Olympic judoka

Personal information
- Born: 16 July 1978 (age 48) Budapest, Hungary

Sport
- Sport: Judo
Medal record
Representing Hungary
Summer Universiade
Bronze medal – third place	1999 Palma de Mallorca	-63 kg

Eszter Csizmadia (born 16 July 1978) is a Hungarian former judoka who competed in the 2000 Summer Olympics.
