= Hermágoras Manglés =

Venezuelan judoka

Personal information
- Nationality: Venezuelan
- Born: 26 April 1974 (age 50)

Sport
- Sport: Judo

Hermágoras Manglés (born 26 April 1974) is a Venezuelan judoka. He competed in the men's half-middleweight event at the 2000 Summer Olympics.
