= Miklós Illyés =

Hungarian judoka (born 1972)

Personal information
- Born: 12 January 1972 (age 54)
- Occupation: Judoka

Sport
- Sport: Judo

Profile at external databases
- JudoInside.com: 2701

Miklós Illyés (born 12 January 1972) is a Hungarian judoka.

== Achievements ==
Year	Tournament	Place	Weight class
2001	European Judo Championships	7th	Lightweight (73 kg)
1999	World Judo Championships	5th	Lightweight (73 kg)
