= Carlos Méndez (judoka) =

Puerto Rican judoka (born 1972)

Personal information
- Nationality: Puerto Rican
- Born: 27 June 1972 (age 54)

Sport
- Sport: Judo
Medal record
Representing Puerto Rico
Pan American Games
Silver medal – second place	1999 Winnipeg	Lightweight
Central American and Caribbean Games
Silver medal – second place	1998 Maracaibo	Lightweight

Carlos Méndez Acevedo (born 27 June 1972) is a Puerto Rican judoka. He competed in the men's lightweight event at the 2000 Summer Olympics.
