= Sandra Godinho =

Portuguese judoka

Personal information
- Nationality: Portuguese
- Born: 30 April 1973 (age 53) Lisbon, Portugal

Sport
- Sport: Judo

Sandra Godinho (born 30 April 1973) is a Portuguese judoka. She competed at the 1992 Summer Olympics and the 2000 Summer Olympics.
