= Vanesa Arenas =

Spanish judoka (born 1978)

Personal information
- Born: 17 November 1978 (age 47) Madrid, Spain
- Occupation: Judoka

Sport
- Country: Spain
- Sport: Judo
- Weight class: –48 kg

Achievements and titles
- Olympic Games: 9th (2000)
- World Champ.: 5th (1999)
- European Champ.: (bronze) (2007)
Medal record
Women's judo
Representing Spain
European Championships
Bronze medal – third place	2007 Belgrade	–48 kg

Profile at external databases
- IJF: 30420
- JudoInside.com: 615
- Updated on 16 November 2022

Vanesa Arenas (born 17 November 1978) is a Spanish judoka. She competed in the women's extra-lightweight event at the 2000 Summer Olympics.
