= Maarten Arens =

Dutch judoka (born 1972)

Personal information
- Full name: Maarten Johannes Arens
- Born: 20 May 1972 (age 54) Diemen, North Holland
- Occupation: Judoka

Sport
- Country: Netherlands
- Sport: Judo
- Weight class: ‍–‍81 kg, ‍–‍86 kg
- Rank: 6th dan black belt

Achievements and titles
- Olympic Games: 9th (2000)
- World Champ.: 7th (1999)
- European Champ.: (gold) (1995)
Medal record
Men's judo
Representing the Netherlands
European Championships
Gold medal – first place	1995 Birmingham	‍–‍86 kg
Silver medal – second place	1999 Bratislava	‍–‍81 kg
European Junior Championships
Silver medal – second place	1992 Jerusalem	‍–‍78 kg
Bronze medal – third place	1991 Pieksämäki	‍–‍78 kg

Profile at external databases
- IJF: 259
- JudoInside.com: 1
- Updated on 13 March 2023

Maarten Johannes Arens (born 20 May 1972 in Diemen, North Holland) is a Dutch judoka. He has been European Champion (1995) in Birmingham in the 86 kg category, 4 times Dutch champion, and winner of the 2000 Tournoi de Paris in the 81 kg category. At the Sydney Olympics he finished in 9th place in the 81 kg category.

Arens was a member of Judo club Hans Meester Hoorn till 1992, later becoming a member of the judo club KENAMJU Haarlem.

== Coach ==
In 2001 he started as national junior coach of the Dutch Judo Federation, among his pupils: Dex Elmont, Jeroen Mooren and Henk Grol. In 2005 he became head coach of the Dutch Judo Men. He stayed head coach until the Summer Olympics 2016 in Rio de Janeiro. In this period he was personal coach of: Guillaume Elmont, Dex Elmont, Henk Grol, Ruben Houkes and Noel van t End.

After the Dutch Judo Federation has decided to centralize their program, he became head coach men and women and head of the National Training Centrer at Papendal. He was coach of Henk Grol, Marhinde Verkerk and Kim Polling. He was also coach of the team with: Benito Maij, JP Bell, Michael Bazynksi, Garmt Zijlstra, Akkie Muilwijk, Zeger van Oirschot and Matthew Purssey

=== Results ===
The results of Arens as coach

- 2005: Guillaume Elmont and Dennis van der Geest World champion Cairo Egypt, Bronze Mark Huizinga
- 2007: Ruben Houkes World champion in Rio de Janeiro Brasil, bronze Guilaume Elmont
- 2009: Henk Grol Vice- World champion Rotterdam The Netherlands
- 2010: Dex Elmont and Henk Grol both Vice Worldchampion Tokyo Japan
- 2011: Dex Elmont vice World champion Paris France
- 2012: Henk Grol bronze Olympic games London England
- 2013: Henk Grol Vice World champion and Dex Elmont Bronze Rio de Janeiro Brasil
- 2018: Guusje Steenhuis Vice World champion Baku Azerbaidjan, Marhinde Verkerk and Juul Franssen Bronze medals (not match coach).
- 2019: Noel van T End World Champion Tokyo Japan, Juul Franssen, Roy Meyer and Michael Korrel Bronze medals (not match coach).

== Achievements ==
Year	Tournament	Place	Weight class
2000	European Judo Championships	7th	Half middleweight (81 kg)
1999	World Judo Championships	7th	Half middleweight (81 kg)
1999	European Judo Championships	2nd	Half middleweight (81 kg)
1998	European Judo Championships	5th	Half middleweight (81 kg)
1995	European Judo Championships	1st	Middleweight (86 kg)

== Trivia ==
Arens got promoted to 6th dan on 27 November 2011.
