= Mariana Martins =

Brazilian judoka

Personal information
- Nationality: Brazilian
- Born: 11 February 1983 (age 43)

Sport
- Sport: Judo

Mariana Martins (born 11 February 1983) is a Brazilian judoka. She competed in the women's extra-lightweight event at the 2000 Summer Olympics.
