= Eleucadia Vargas =

Dominican Republic judoka

Personal information
- Born: February 14, 1970 (age 56)
Medal record
Women's Judo
Representing Dominican Republic
Pan American Games
Bronze medal – third place	1991 Havana	Half-Middleweight
Bronze medal – third place	1999 Winnipeg	Half-Middleweight

Eleucadia Vargas Reyes (born February 14, 1970) is a female judoka from the Dominican Republic. She competed for her native country at two Summer Olympics: 1992 and 2000. Vargas won a total number of two bronze medals at the Pan American Games in the 1990s.
