= Laura Moise =

Romanian judoka

Personal information
- Full name: Laura Manuela Moise
- Nationality: Romanian
- Born: 11 October 1976 (age 50) Onești, Romania

Sport
- Sport: Judo

Laura Manuela Moise (born 11 October 1976) is a Romanian judoka. She competed in the women's extra-lightweight event at the 2000 Summer Olympics.
