= Ann Simons =

Belgian Olympic judoka

Personal information
- Born: 5 August 1980 (age 45)
- Occupation: Judoka

Sport
- Country: Belgium
- Sport: Judo
- Weight class: –48 kg
- Club: Lommel; Maasmechelen; Judoclub Gellik

Achievements and titles
- Olympic Games: (bronze) (2000)
- World Champ.: 5th (2005)
- European Champ.: (bronze) (1999, 2001, 2003)
Medal record
Women's judo
Representing Belgium
Olympic Games
Bronze medal – third place	2000 Sydney	‍–‍48 kg
European Championships
Bronze medal – third place	1999 Bratislava	‍–‍48 kg
Bronze medal – third place	2001 Paris	‍–‍48 kg
Bronze medal – third place	2003 Düsseldorf	‍–‍48 kg
World Juniors Championships
Bronze medal – third place	1998 Cali	‍–‍48 kg
European Junior Championships
Gold medal – first place	1999 Rome	‍–‍48 kg
Bronze medal – third place	1998 Bucharest	‍–‍48 kg

Profile at external databases
- IJF: 53069
- JudoInside.com: 189
- Updated on 1 June 2023

Ann Simons (born 5 August 1980 in Tongeren) is a judoka from Belgium.

== Career ==
Born in Tongeren, Simons was an 8 time Belgian champion in the category ‍–‍48 kg. In 2001 and 2003 she also won bronze medals at the European Championships. In 2000, she won the bronze medal in the European Championship for teams. The high point of her career was winning the bronze medal in the ‍–‍48 kg category at the 2000 Summer Olympics in Sydney.

Simons had to retire from the judo sport in 2006 due to a persistent knee injury.
