= Jenny Hill (judoka) =

Australian judoka

Personal information
- Nationality: Australian
- Born: 20 November 1972 (age 53) Canberra, Australia
- Occupation: Judoka

Sport
- Sport: Judo

Profile at external databases
- JudoInside.com: 12072

Jenny Hill (born 20 November 1972) is an Australian judoka. She competed in the women's half-middleweight event at the 2000 Summer Olympics.
