= Zhao Shunxin =

Chinese judoka (born 1979)

Zhao Shunxin (born 11 October 1979) is a Chinese former judoka who competed in the 2000 Summer Olympics.
