= Salima Souakri =

Algerian judoka (born 1974)

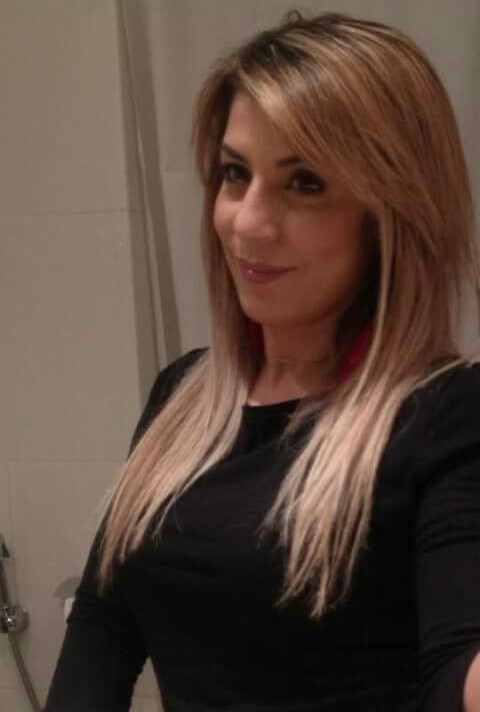

Secretary of State for Youth and Sports
- In office 29 June 2020 – 7 July 2021
- President: Abdelmadjid Tebboune
- Prime Minister: Aymen Benabderrahmane; Nadir Larbaoui
- Preceded by: Noureddine Morceli

Personal details
- Born: December 6, 1974 (age 51)

Salima Souakri (born 6 December 1974) is an Algerian judoka who competed at four Olympic Games.

== Career ==
She finished in joint fifth place in the extra-lightweight (48 kg) division at the 1996 Summer Olympics, having lost the bronze medal match to Yolanda Soler of Spain. She moved up to the half-lightweight (52 kg) division, finishing seventh in the 2000 Olympic Games and fifth again at the 2004 Olympic Games in Athens. On this occasion she lost the bronze medal match to Amarilis Savon of Cuba.

Between 29 June 2020 and 7 July 2021, Souakri served as Secretary of State for Youth and Sports, succeeding Noureddine Morceli.
