= Park Sung-ja =

South Korean judoka

Personal information
- Born: 26 August 1980 (age 46) Yongin, South Korea

Sport
- Sport: Judo
Medal record
Representing South Korea
Summer Universiade
Silver medal – second place	1999 Palma de Mallorca	Extra lightweight

Park Sung-Ja (born 26 August 1980) is a Korean former judoka who competed in the 2000 Summer Olympics.
