= Victoria Dunn =

British judoka (born 1977)

Personal information
- Nationality: British
- Born: 13 August 1977 (age 47); Greenwich, England

Sport
- Sport: Judo

Victoria Dunn (born 13 August 1977) is a British judoka. She competed in the women's extra-lightweight event at the 2000 Summer Olympics. She is a three times champion of Great Britain, winning the extra-lightweight division at the British Judo Championships in 1997 and the half-lightweight division in 2002 and 2003.
