= Lyubov Bruletova =

Russian judoka (born 1973)

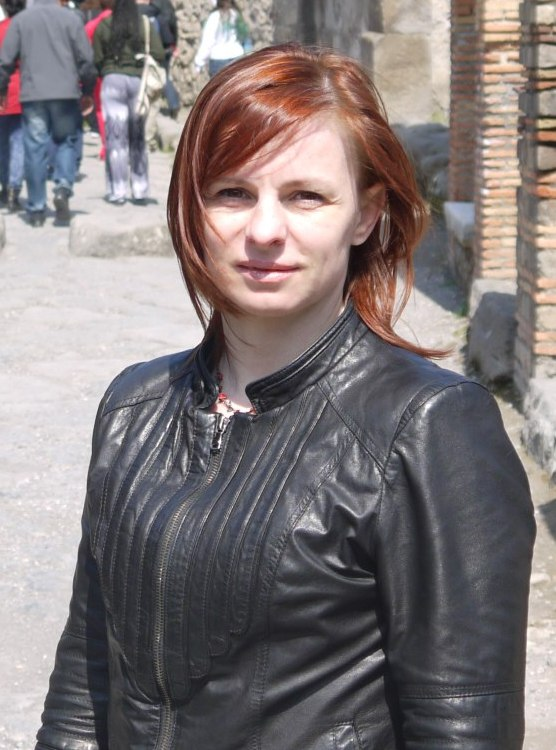

Personal information
- Born: 17 September 1973 (age 53) Ivanovo, Russian SFSR, Soviet Union
- Occupation: Judoka

Sport
- Country: Russia
- Sport: Judo
- Weight class: –48 kg

Achievements and titles
- Olympic Games: (silver) (2000)
- World Champ.: R16 (2003)
- European Champ.: (gold) (2003)

Profile at external databases
- IJF: 12696, 53088
- JudoInside.com: 559
- Updated on 1 June 2023

Lyubov Aleksandrovna Bruletova (Russian: Любовь Александровна Брулетова; born 17 September 1973) is a Russian judoka. Now she is judoka coach.

Bruletova won a silver medal in the extra-lightweight (‍–‍48 kg) division at the 2000 Summer Olympics.
