= Cha Hyon-hyang =

North Korean judoka (born 1979)

- Hangul: 차현향
- RR: Cha Hyeonhyang
- MR: Ch'a Hyŏnhyang

Cha Hyon-Hyang (born 3 October 1979) is a North Korean former judoka who competed in the 2000 Summer Olympics.
