= Sarah Nichilo-Rosso =

French judoka

Personal information
- Nationality: French
- Born: 22 October 1976 (age 48)
- Occupation: Judoka

Sport
- Sport: Judo

Profile at external databases
- JudoInside.com: 384

Sarah Nichilo-Rosso (born 22 October 1976) is a French judoka. She competed at the 1996 Summer Olympics and the 2000 Summer Olympics.

She placed third in both the 1996 Olympic games and in the 1999 Judo World Championships in Birmingham. In the 2001 World Championships in Munich she placed 7th.
