= Judo at the 1995 Summer Universiade =

Judo competition

Judo Judo at the 1995 Summer Universiade
- Location: Fukuoka, Japan
- Dates: 24–28 August 1995

Medalists
| gold medal | Japan (2nd title) |
| silver medal | South Korea |
| bronze medal | Cuba |

Champions
- Men's team: South Korea (1st title)

Competition at external databases
- Links: JudoInside

The Judo competition in the 1995 Summer Universiade were held in Fukuoka, Japan from 24 August to 28 August 1995.

== Medal overview ==
=== Men's event ===
| Event | Gold | Silver | Bronze |
|---|---|---|---|
| Extra-lightweight (60 kg) | Kim Hyuk (KOR) | Marek Matuszek (SVK) | Kenichi Harada (JPN) |
| Extra-lightweight (60 kg) | Kim Hyuk (KOR) | Marek Matuszek (SVK) | Ênio Kanayama (BRA) |
| Half-lightweight (65 kg) | Jung Se-Hoon (KOR) | Ryuta Yumiya (JPN) | Igor Koliev (BLR) |
| Half-lightweight (65 kg) | Jung Se-Hoon (KOR) | Ryuta Yumiya (JPN) | Christopher McDonald (USA) |
| Lightweight (71 kg) | Kenzo Nakamura (JPN) | Lee Eun-hak (KOR) | Christophe Massina (FRA) |
| Lightweight (71 kg) | Kenzo Nakamura (JPN) | Lee Eun-hak (KOR) | Rouslan Sazonov (RUS) |
| Half-middleweight (78 kg) | Kazunori Kubota (JPN) | Cho In-Chul (KOR) | Yuan Chao (CHN) |
| Half-middleweight (78 kg) | Kazunori Kubota (JPN) | Cho In-Chul (KOR) | Juhani Tanayama (FIN) |
| Middleweight (86 kg) | Masaru Tanabe (JPN) | Mário Sabino (BRA) | Dmitri Morozov (RUS) |
| Middleweight (86 kg) | Masaru Tanabe (JPN) | Mário Sabino (BRA) | Chang Jin-Chul (KOR) |
| Half-heavyweight (95 kg) | Youri Stepkine (RUS) | Ángel Sánchez (CUB) | Koba Nadiradze (UKR) |
| Half-heavyweight (95 kg) | Youri Stepkine (RUS) | Ángel Sánchez (CUB) | Takeshi Kozai (JPN) |
| Heavyweight (+95 kg) | Yoshiharu Makishi (JPN) | Mitar Milinkovic (YUG) | Volker Heyer (GER) |
| Heavyweight (+95 kg) | Yoshiharu Makishi (JPN) | Mitar Milinkovic (YUG) | Rogério Biondi (BRA) |
| Openweight | Katsuyuki Masuchi (JPN) | Karim Boumedjane (FRA) | Mikhail Korobeinikov (RUS) |
| Openweight | Katsuyuki Masuchi (JPN) | Karim Boumedjane (FRA) | Ko Kyung-Doo (KOR) |
| Team | South Korea | Russia | Japan |
| Team | South Korea | Russia | Poland |

=== Women's event ===
| Event | Gold | Silver | Bronze |
|---|---|---|---|
| Extra-lightweight (48 kg) | Ryoko Tamura (JPN) | Amarilis Savón (CUB) | Lioubov Brouletova (RUS) |
| Extra-lightweight (48 kg) | Ryoko Tamura (JPN) | Amarilis Savón (CUB) | Sylvie Meloux (FRA) |
| Half-lightweight (52 kg) | He Ji (CHN) | Hyun Sook-Hee (KOR) | Legna Verdecia (CUB) |
| Half-lightweight (52 kg) | He Ji (CHN) | Hyun Sook-Hee (KOR) | Atsuko Takeda (JPN) |
| Lightweight (56 kg) | Driulis González (CUB) | Chiyori Tateno (JPN) | Jung Sun-Yong (KOR) |
| Lightweight (56 kg) | Driulis González (CUB) | Chiyori Tateno (JPN) | Baton Magali (FRA) |
| Half-middleweight (61 kg) | Jung Sung-Sook (KOR) | Séverine Vandenhende (FRA) | Qin Yuying (CHN) |
| Half-middleweight (61 kg) | Jung Sung-Sook (KOR) | Séverine Vandenhende (FRA) | Zulueta Beltran (CUB) |
| Middleweight (66 kg) | Cho Min-Sun (KOR) | Karine Rambault (FRA) | Michelle Holt (GBR) |
| Middleweight (66 kg) | Cho Min-Sun (KOR) | Karine Rambault (FRA) | Wu Mei-Ling (TPE) |
| Half-heavyweight (72 kg) | Saki Yoshida (JPN) | Castellanos Diadenis (CUB) | Ylenia Scapin (ITA) |
| Half-heavyweight (72 kg) | Saki Yoshida (JPN) | Castellanos Diadenis (CUB) | Zhang Yanhong (CHN) |
| Heavyweight (+72 kg) | Beltran Guisado (CUB) | Marta Kolodziejczyk (POL) | Hu Haifang (CHN) |
| Heavyweight (+72 kg) | Beltran Guisado (CUB) | Marta Kolodziejczyk (POL) | Hidemi Seo (JPN) |
| Openweight | Noriko Anno (JPN) | Marta Kolodziejczyk (POL) | Sun Fuming (CHN) |
| Openweight | Noriko Anno (JPN) | Marta Kolodziejczyk (POL) | Shon Hyun-Me (KOR) |

== Results overview ==
=== Men's event ===
==== 60 kg ====
| Position | Judoka | Country |
|---|---|---|
| 1. | Kim Hyuk | South Korea |
| 2. | Marek Matuszek | Slovakia |
| 3. | Kenichi Harada | Japan |
| 3. | Ênio Kanayama | Brazil |
| 5. | Zsolt Kunyik | Hungary |
| 5. | Roberto Cueto | Spain |
| 7. | Nestor Khergiani | Georgia |
| 7. | Andreas Kolbig | Germany |

==== 65 kg ====
| Position | Judoka | Country |
|---|---|---|
| 1. | Jung Se-Hoon | South Korea |
| 2. | Ryuta Yumiya | Japan |
| 3. | Igor Koliev | Belarus |
| 3. | Christopher McDonald | United States |
| 5. | Israel Hernández | Cuba |
| 5. | Patrick van Kalken | Netherlands |
| 7. | Francesco Giorgi | Italy |
| 7. | Lin Wen-Tao | Chinese Taipei |

==== 71 kg ====
| Position | Judoka | Country |
|---|---|---|
| 1. | Kenzo Nakamura | Japan |
| 2. | Lee Eun-hak | South Korea |
| 3. | Christophe Massina | France |
| 3. | Rouslan Sazonov | Russia |
| 5. | Eduard Steringa | Netherlands |
| 5. | Samuel Salvador | Spain |
| 7. | Vardan Moivsisian | Armenia |
| 7. | Raouan Inatillaev | Kazakhstan |

==== 78 kg ====
| Position | Judoka | Country |
|---|---|---|
| 1. | Kazunori Kubota | Japan |
| 2. | Cho In-Chul | South Korea |
| 3. | Yuan Chao | China |
| 3. | Juhani Tanayama | Finland |
| 5. | Alexander Guedes | Brazil |
| 5. | Alexis Landais | France |
| 7. | Giorgi Tsmindashvili | Georgia |
| 7. | Dirk Radszat | Germany |

==== 86 kg ====
| Position | Judoka | Country |
|---|---|---|
| 1. | Masaru Tanabe | Japan |
| 2. | Mário Sabino | Brazil |
| 3. | Dmitri Morozov | Russia |
| 3. | Chang Jin-Chul | South Korea |
| 5. | Michele Monti | Italy |
| 5. | Anatoli Droga | Ukraine |
| 7. | Milosav Jocović | FR Yugoslavia |
| 7. | Marek Pisula | Poland |

==== 95 kg ====
| Position | Judoka | Country |
|---|---|---|
| 1. | Youri Stepkine | Russia |
| 2. | Ángel Sánchez | Cuba |
| 3. | Koba Nadiradze | Ukraine |
| 3. | Takeshi Kozai | Japan |
| 5. | Dennis van der Geest | Netherlands |
| 5. | Petr Jákl | Czech Republic |
| 7. | Qiao Chunlin | China |
| 7. | Yen Kuo-che | Chinese Taipei |

==== +95 kg ====
| Position | Judoka | Country |
|---|---|---|
| 1. | Yoshiharu Makishi | Japan |
| 2. | Milinkovic Mitar | FR Yugoslavia |
| 3. | Volker Heyer | Germany |
| 3. | Rogério Biondi | Brazil |
| 5. | Kim Young-hoon | South Korea |
| 5. | Ramaz Chochishvili | Georgia |
| 7. | Stefano Venturelli | Italy |
| 7. | Richard Blanes | Great Britain |

==== Open class ====
| Position | Judoka | Country |
|---|---|---|
| 1. | Katsuyuki Masuchi | Japan |
| 2. | Karim Boumedjane | France |
| 3. | Korobeinikov Mikhail | Russia |
| 3. | Ko Kyung-Doo | South Korea |
| 5. | Dennis van der Geest | Netherlands |
| 5. | Helbing Sven | Germany |
| 7. | Dano Pantić | FR Yugoslavia |
| 7. | Teng Guangying | China |

=== Women's event ===
==== 48 kg ====
| Position | Judoka | Country |
|---|---|---|
| 1. | Ryoko Tamura | Japan |
| 2. | Amarilis Savón | Cuba |
| 3. | Lioubov Brouletova | Russia |
| 3. | Sylvie Meloux | France |
| 5. | Siemens Birte | Germany |
| 5. | Kim So-La | South Korea |
| 7. | Stabler Barbara | Switzerland |
| 7. | Olga Rodina | Ukraine |

==== 52 kg ====
| Position | Judoka | Country |
|---|---|---|
| 1. | He Ji | China |
| 2. | Hyun Sook-Hee | South Korea |
| 3. | Legna Verdecia | Cuba |
| 3. | Atsuko Takeda | Japan |
| 5. | Klára Vészi | Hungary |
| 5. | Salima Souakri | Algeria |
| 7. | Hülya Şenyurt | Turkey |
| 7. | Andrea Vossen | Germany |

==== 56 kg ====
| Position | Judoka | Country |
|---|---|---|
| 1. | Driulis González | Cuba |
| 2. | Chiyori Tateno | Japan |
| 3. | Jung Sun-Yong | South Korea |
| 3. | Baton Magali | France |
| 5. | Marisa Pedulla | United States |
| 5. | Sonia Tognoloni | Italy |
| 7. | Natalia Petoukhova | Russia |
| 7. | Azucena Verde | Spain |

==== 61 kg ====
| Position | Judoka | Country |
|---|---|---|
| 1. | Jung Sung-Sook | South Korea |
| 2. | Séverine Vandenhende | France |
| 3. | Qin Yuying | China |
| 3. | Zulueta Beltran | Cuba |
| 5. | Irina Afonina | Russia |
| 5. | Sandra Wurm | Germany |
| 7. | Irena Tokarz | Poland |
| 7. | Hideko Sugimura | Japan |

==== 66 kg ====
| Position | Judoka | Country |
|---|---|---|
| 1. | Cho Min-Sun | South Korea |
| 2. | Karine Rambault | France |
| 3. | Michelle Holt | United Kingdom |
| 3. | Wu Mei-Ling | Chinese Taipei |
| 5. | Odalis Revé | Cuba |
| 5. | Agata Mróz | Poland |
| 7. | Sally Buckton | South Africa |
| 7. | Almudena López | Spain |

==== 72 kg ====
| Position | Judoka | Country |
|---|---|---|
| 1. | Saki Yoshida | Japan |
| 2. | Castellanos Diadenis Luna | Cuba |
| 3. | Ylenia Scapin | Italy |
| 3. | Zhang Yanhong | China |
| 5. | Carine Varlez | France |
| 5. | Svetlana Galiant | Russia |
| 7. | Svetlana Lyssianskaya | Ukraine |
| 7. | Chen Chiu-Ping | Chinese Taipei |

==== +72 kg ====
| Position | Judoka | Country |
|---|---|---|
| 1. | Beltran Guisado | Cuba |
| 2. | Marta Kolodziejczyk | Poland |
| 3. | Hu Haifang | China |
| 3. | Hidemi Seo | Japan |
| 5. | Donata Burgatta | Italy |
| 5. | Veronika Kozlovskaia | Belarus |
| 7. | Meyrem Suleymanoglu | France |
| 7. | Lee Hyun-Kyung | South Korea |

==== Open class ====
| Position | Judoka | Country |
|---|---|---|
| 1. | Noriko Anno | Japan |
| 2. | Marta Kolodziejczyk | Poland |
| 3. | Sun Fuming | China |
| 3. | Shon Hyun-Me | South Korea |
| 5. | Simona Richter | Romania |
| 5. | Guisado Beltrán | Cuba |
| 7. | Karen Hayde | Canada |
| 7. | Veronika Kozlovskaia | Belarus |

=== Medal table ===
| Rank | Nation | Gold | Silver | Bronze | Total |
|---|---|---|---|---|---|
| 1 | Japan | 8 | 2 | 4 | 14 |
| 2 | South Korea | 4 | 3 | 4 | 11 |
| 3 | Cuba | 2 | 3 | 2 | 7 |
| 4 | China | 1 | 0 | 5 | 6 |
| 5 | Russia | 1 | 0 | 4 | 5 |
| 6 | France | 0 | 3 | 3 | 6 |
| 7 | Poland | 0 | 2 | 0 | 2 |
| 8 | Brazil | 0 | 1 | 2 | 3 |
| 9 | FR Yugoslavia | 0 | 1 | 0 | 1 |
| 9 | Slovakia | 0 | 1 | 0 | 1 |
| 11 | Belarus | 0 | 0 | 1 | 1 |
| 11 | Chinese Taipei | 0 | 0 | 1 | 1 |
| 11 | Finland | 0 | 0 | 1 | 1 |
| 11 | Germany | 0 | 0 | 1 | 1 |
| 11 | Great Britain | 0 | 0 | 1 | 1 |
| 11 | Italy | 0 | 0 | 1 | 1 |
| 11 | Ukraine | 0 | 0 | 1 | 1 |
| 11 | United States | 0 | 0 | 1 | 1 |
| Totals (18 entries) | | 16 | 16 | 32 | 64 |
