= Judo at the 2000 Summer Olympics – Men's 66 kg =

Judo competition

Men's 66 kg at the Games of the XXVII Olympiad
- Venue: Sydney Convention and Exhibition Centre
- Date: 17 September 2000
- Competitors: 35 from 35 nations

Medalists
1st place, gold medalist(s)		Hüseyin Özkan	Turkey
2nd place, silver medalist(s)		Larbi Benboudaoud	France
3rd place, bronze medalist(s)		Girolamo Giovinazzo	Italy
3rd place, bronze medalist(s)		Giorgi Vazagashvili	Georgia

Men's 66 kg competition in judo at the 2000 Summer Olympics was held on 17 September at the Sydney Convention and Exhibition Centre.

This event was the second-lightest of the men's judo weight classes, limiting competitors to a maximum of 66 kilograms of body mass. Like all other judo events, bouts lasted five minutes. If the bout was still tied at the end, it was extended for another five-minute, sudden-death period; if neither judoka scored during that period, the match is decided by the judges. The tournament bracket consisted of a single-elimination contest culminating in a gold medal match. There was also a repechage to determine the winners of the two bronze medals. Each judoka who had lost to a semifinalist competed in the repechage. The two judokas who lost in the semifinals faced the winner of the opposite half of the bracket's repechage in bronze medal bouts.

== Schedule ==
All times are Australian Eastern Daylight Time (UTC+11:00)

Date	Time	Round
Sunday, 17 September 2000	15:00; 20:30	Preliminaries & Repechage; Final

== Tournament results ==
=== Final ===
Final
1	Hüseyin Özkan (TUR)	1000
2	Larbi Benboudaoud (FRA)	0002

=== Mat 1 ===
First round matches

	Score	
Tarek Ayad (LBA)	0001–1010	Yukimasa Nakamura (JPN)
Victor Bivol (MDA)	1110–0000	Mansur Zhumayev (UZB)

Elimination rounds

Round of 32
Patrick van Kalken (NED)	0001
Pürevdorjiin Nyamlkhagva (MGL)	0001
Yukimasa Nakamura (JPN)	0201
Anis Lounifi (TUN)	0100
Martín Ríos (ARG)	0000
Islam Matsiev (RUS)	0200
Jean Claude Cameroun (CMR)	0011
Ivan Baglayev (KAZ)	1000
Hüseyin Özkan (TUR)	0110
Arash Miresmaeili (IRI)	0001
József Csák (HUN)	0000
Georgi Georgiev (BUL)	0010
Zhang Guangjun (CHN)	1000
Victor Bivol (MDA)	0000
Andrew Collett (AUS)	1001
Javier Wanga (ARU)	0000

Round of 16
Patrick van Kalken (NED)	1100
Yukimasa Nakamura (JPN)	0020
Islam Matsiev (RUS)	0011
Ivan Baglayev (KAZ)	1000
Hüseyin Özkan (TUR)	0021
Georgi Georgiev (BUL)	0011
Zhang Guangjun (CHN)	1000
Andrew Collett (AUS)	0000

Quarterfinals
Patrick van Kalken (NED)	1000
Ivan Baglayev (KAZ)	0010
Hüseyin Özkan (TUR)	1000
Zhang Guangjun (CHN)	0000

Semifinals
Patrick van Kalken (NED)	0010
Hüseyin Özkan (TUR)	0020

=== Mat 2 ===
First round matches

	Score	
Larbi Benboudaoud (FRA)	1010–0000	Han Ji-hwan (KOR)

Elimination rounds

Round of 32
Larbi Benboudaoud (FRA)	1000
Jorge Quintanal (GUA)	0000
Miguel Angel Moreno (ESA)	0000
David Somerville (GBR)	1000
Kevin Ngapoula-Mbembo (CGO)	0000
Kiyoshi Uematsu (ESP)	1000
Alex Ottiano (USA)	0001
Amar Meridja (ALG)	0001
Yordanis Arencibia (CUB)	0001
Giorgi Vazagashvili (GEO)	1000
Pedro Caravana (POR)	0012
Ludwig Ortíz (VEN)	0010
Henrique Guimaraes (BRA)	1000
Gabriel Bengtsson (SWE)	0011
Melvin Méndez (PUR)	0000
Girolamo Giovinazzo (ITA)	1000

Round of 16
Larbi Benboudaoud (FRA)	0040
David Somerville (GBR)	0001
Kiyoshi Uematsu (ESP)	0020
Alex Ottiano (USA)	0000
Giorgi Vazagashvili (GEO)	1101
Pedro Caravana (POR)	0010
Henrique Guimaraes (BRA)	0000
Girolamo Giovinazzo (ITA)	1000

Quarterfinals
Larbi Benboudaoud (FRA)	1010
Kiyoshi Uematsu (ESP)	0000
Giorgi Vazagashvili (GEO)	0000
Girolamo Giovinazzo (ITA)	1010

Semifinals
Larbi Benboudaoud (FRA)	1000
Girolamo Giovinazzo (ITA)	0000

=== Repechage ===
The losing semifinalists as well as those judoka eliminated in earlier rounds by the four semifinalists of the main bracket advanced to the repechage. These matches determined the two bronze medalists for the event.

First round matches

Since 23 judoka qualified for the repechage, one match was held to reduce the field to 22.

	Score	
Han Ji-hwan (KOR)	0002–0001	Jorge Quintanal (GUA)

Elimination rounds

First round
Pürevdorjiin Nyamlkhagva (MGL)	0010
Yukimasa Nakamura (JPN)	0011
Arash Miresmaeili (IRI)	1001
Georgi Georgiev (BUL)	0000
Han Ji-hwan (KOR)	1001
David Somerville (GBR)	0000
Melvin Méndez (PUR)	0000
Henrique Guimaraes (BRA)	0011

Second round
Yukimasa Nakamura (JPN)	1010
Ivan Baglayev (KAZ)	0000
Arash Miresmaeili (IRI)	1001
Zhang Guangjun (CHN)	0001
Han Ji-hwan (KOR)	0010
Kiyoshi Uematsu (ESP)	0001
Henrique Guimaraes (BRA)	0000
Giorgi Vazagashvili (GEO)	1010

Third round
Yukimasa Nakamura (JPN)	0000
Arash Miresmaeili (IRI)	1000
Han Ji-hwan (KOR)	0010
Giorgi Vazagashvili (GEO)	1100

Bronze medal finals
Arash Miresmaeili (IRI)	0010
Girolamo Giovinazzo (ITA)	0010
Giorgi Vazagashvili (GEO)	0210
Patrick van Kalken (NED)	0110
