= 1996 European Judo Championships =

1996 Judo European Judo Championships
- Location: The Hague, Netherlands
- Dates: 16–19 May 1996

Competition at external databases
- Links: JudoInside

The 1996 European Judo Championships were the 7th edition of the European Judo Championships, and were held in The Hague, Netherlands from 16 to 19 May 1996.

== Medal overview ==
=== Men ===
Event	Gold	Silver	Bronze
60 kg	(Georgia (country)) Giorgi Vazagashvili	(United Kingdom) Nigel Donohue	(Italy) Girolamo Giovinazzo (France) Franck Chambilly
65 kg	(Georgia (country)) Giorgi Revazishvili	(United Kingdom) Julian Davis	(Germany) Peter Schlatter (France) Larbi Benboudaoud
71 kg	(United Kingdom) Danny Kingston	(Austria) Thomas Schleicher	(France) Christophe Gagliano (Ukraine) Ilya Chimchiuri
78 kg	(France) Djamel Bouras	(Moldova) Oleg Cretul	(Russia) Konstantin Savtchichkine (Austria) Patrick Reiter
86 kg	(Netherlands) Mark Huizinga	(Russia) Oleg Maltsev	(United Kingdom) Ryan Birch (Austria) Sergei Klischin
95 kg	(Poland) Paweł Nastula	(Portugal) Pedro Soares	(France) Ghislain Lemaire (Russia) Dmitri Sergeyev
+95 kg	(Georgia (country)) David Khakhaleishvili	(Russia) Serguei Kossorotov	(Turkey) Selim Tataroğlu (Poland) Rafał Kubacki
Open class	(Estonia) Indrek Pertelson	(Turkey) Selim Tataroğlu	(Belgium) Harry Van Barneveld (Georgia (country)) Ramaz Chochosvili

=== Women ===
Event	Gold	Silver	Bronze
48 kg	(Spain) Yolanda Soler	(Germany) Jana Perlberg	(Romania) Laura Moise (Italy) Giovanna Tortora
52 kg	(United Kingdom) Sharon Rendle	(Italy) Alessandra Giungi	(Belgium) Nicole Flagothier (France) Marie-Claire Restoux
56 kg	(Netherlands) Jessica Gal	(Hungary) Mária Pékli	(France) Magali Baton (Spain) Isabel Fernández
61 kg	(Belgium) Gella Vandecaveye	(France) Cathérine Fleury-Vachon	(Netherlands) Jenny Gal (United Kingdom) Diane Bell
66 kg	(Netherlands) Claudia Zwiers	(Italy) Emanuela Pierantozzi	(Germany) Anja Von Rekowski (Czech Republic) Helena Štusáková
72 kg	(Belgium) Ulla Werbrouck	(Netherlands) Karin Kienhuis	(Germany) Hannah Ertel (France) Estha Essombe
+72 kg	(Netherlands) Angelique Seriese	(Germany) Johanna Hagn	(Russia) Svetlana Goundarenko (United Kingdom) Michelle Rogers
Open class	(Netherlands) Monique van der Lee	(Italy) Donata Burgatta	(Romania) Simona Richter (Russia) Irina Rodina

=== Medal table ===
Rank	Nation	Gold	Silver	Bronze	Total
1	Netherlands	5	1	0	6
2	Georgia	3	0	1	4
3	Great Britain	2	2	3	7
4	Belgium	2	0	2	4
5	France	1	1	7	9
6	Poland	1	0	1	2
6	Spain	1	0	1	2
8	Estonia	1	0	0	1
9	Italy	0	3	3	6
10	Russia	0	2	4	6
11	Germany	0	2	3	5
12	Austria	0	1	2	3
13	Turkey	0	1	1	2
14	Hungary	0	1	0	1
14	Moldova	0	1	0	1
14	Portugal	0	1	0	1
17	Romania	0	0	2	2
18	Czech Republic	0	0	1	1
18	Ukraine	0	0	1	1
Totals (19 entries)		16	16	32	64

== Results overview ==
=== Men ===
==== 60 kg ====
Position	Judoka	Country
1.	Giorgi Vazagashvili	Georgia
2.	Nigel Donohue	Great Britain
3.	Girolamo Giovinazzo	Italy
3.	Franck Chambilly	France
5.	Nikolay Oyegin	Russia
5.	Natik Bagirov	Belarus
7.	Ulduz Sultanov	Azerbaijan
7.	Marek Matuszek	Slovakia

==== 65 kg ====
Position	Judoka	Country
1.	Giorgi Revazishvili	Georgia
2.	Julian Davis	Great Britain
3.	Peter Schlatter	Germany
3.	Larbi Benboudaoud	France
5.	Islam Matsiev	Russia
5.	Jarosław Lewak	Poland
7.	Philip Laats	Belgium
7.	Bektaş Demirel	Turkey

==== 71 kg ====
Position	Judoka	Country
1.	Danny Kingston	Great Britain
2.	Thomas Schleicher	Austria
3.	Christophe Gagliano	France
3.	Ilya Chimchiuri	Ukraine
5.	Davor Vlaskovac	Bosnia and Herzegovina
5.	Jorma Korhonen	Finland
7.	Ralf Akoto	Germany
7.	Vardan Moivsisian	Armenia

==== 78 kg ====
Position	Judoka	Country
1.	Djamel Bouras	France
2.	Oleg Cretul	Moldova
3.	Konstantin Savtchichkine	Russia
3.	Patrick Reiter	Austria
5.	Irakli Uznadze	Turkey
5.	Siarhei Kukharenka	Belarus
7.	Karen Balayan	Ukraine
7.	Bronisław Wołkowicz	Poland

==== 86 kg ====
Position	Judoka	Country
1.	Mark Huizinga	Netherlands
2.	Oleg Maltsev	Russia
3.	Ryan Birch	Great Britain
3.	Sergei Klischin	Austria
5.	Ruslan Mashurenko	Ukraine
5.	Adrian Croitoru	Romania
7.	Algimantas Merkevičius	Lithuania
7.	León Villar	Spain

==== 95 kg ====
Position	Judoka	Country
1.	Paweł Nastula	Poland
2.	Pedro Soares	Portugal
3.	Ghislain Lemaire	France
3.	Dmitri Sergeyev	Russia
5.	Leonid Svirid	Belarus
5.	Ben Sonnemans	Netherlands
7.	Mevlud Lobzhanidze	Georgia
7.	Antal Kovács	Hungary

==== +95 kg ====
Position	Judoka	Country
1.	David Khakhaleishvili	Georgia
2.	Serguei Kossorotov	Russia
3.	Selim Tataroğlu	Turkey
3.	Rafał Kubacki	Poland
5.	Ralf Koser	Germany
5.	Imre Csösz	Hungary
7.	Denny Ebbers	Netherlands
7.	Igor Mueller	Luxembourg

==== Open class ====
Position	Judoka	Country
1.	Indrek Pertelson	Estonia
2.	Selim Tataroğlu	Turkey
3.	Harry Van Barneveld	Belgium
3.	Ramaz Chochosvili	Ukraine
5.	Alexander Davitashvili	Georgia
5.	Valeriu Perdivara	Romania
7.	Volker Heyer	Germany
7.	Igor Mueller	Luxembourg

=== Women ===
==== 48 kg ====
Position	Judoka	Country
1.	Yolanda Soler	Spain
2.	Jana Perlberg	Germany
3.	Laura Moise	Romania
3.	Giovanna Tortora	Italy
5.	Sylvie Meloux	France
5.	Tatiana Moskvina	Belarus
7.	Tatiana Kouvchinova	Russia
7.	Justina Pinheiro	Portugal

==== 52 kg ====
Position	Judoka	Country
1.	Sharon Rendle	Great Britain
2.	Alessandra Giungi	Italy
3.	Nicole Flagothier	Belgium
3.	Marie-Claire Restoux	France
5.	Ewa Larysa Krause	Poland
5.	Almudena Muñoz	Spain
7.	Alexa Von Schwichow	Germany
7.	Marina Kovriguina	Russia

==== 56 kg ====
Position	Judoka	Country
1.	Jessica Gal	Netherlands
2.	Mária Pékli	Hungary
3.	Magali Baton	France
3.	Isabel Fernández	Spain
5.	Beata Kucharzewska	Poland
5.	Zulfiyya Huseinova	Azerbaijan
7.	Nicola Fairbrother	Great Britain
7.	Francesca Campanini	Italy

==== 61 kg ====
Position	Judoka	Country
1.	Gella Vandecaveye	Belgium
2.	Cathérine Fleury-Vachon	France
3.	Jenny Gal	Italy
3.	Diane Bell	Great Britain
5.	Sara Álvarez	Spain
5.	Ilknur Kobaş	Turkey
7.	Susann Singer	Germany
7.	Andreia Cavalleri	Portugal

==== 66 kg ====
Position	Judoka	Country
1.	Claudia Zwiers	Netherlands
2.	Emanuela Pierantozzi	Italy
3.	Anja Von Rekowski	Germany
3.	Helena Štusáková	Czech Republic
5.	Heidi Rakels	Belgium
5.	Rowena Sweatman	Great Britain
7.	Catarina Rodrigues	Portugal
7.	R Kotelnikova	Russia

==== 72 kg ====
Position	Judoka	Country
1.	Ulla Werbrouck	Belgium
2.	Karin Kienhuis	Netherlands
3.	Hannah Ertel	Germany
3.	Estha Essombe	France
5.	Kate Howey	Great Britain
5.	Cristina Curto	Spain
7.	Tetyana Belajeva	Ukraine
7.	Doris Pöllhuber	Austria

==== +72 kg ====
Position	Judoka	Country
1.	Angelique Seriese	Netherlands
2.	Johanna Hagn	Germany
3.	Svetlana Goundarenko	Russia
3.	Michelle Rogers	Great Britain
5.	Éva Granicz	Hungary
5.	Mara Kovačević	Yugoslavia
7.	Christine Cicot	France
7.	Beata Maksymow	Poland

==== Open class ====
Position	Judoka	Country
1.	Monique van der Lee	Netherlands
2.	Donata Burgatta	Italy
3.	Simona Richter	Romania
3.	Irina Rodina	Russia
5.	Sandra Köppen	Germany
5.	Josephine Horton	Great Britain
7.	Gaëlle Potel	France
7.	Tsvetana Bozhilova	Bulgaria
