= 2001 European Judo Championships =

2001 Judo European Judo Championships
- Venue: Accor Arena
- Location: Paris, France
- Dates: 18–20 May 2001

Competition at external databases
- Links: JudoInside

The 2001 European Judo Championships were the 12th edition of the European Judo Championships, and were held in Paris, France from 18 to 20 May 2001.

== Medal overview ==
=== Men ===
Event	Gold	Silver	Bronze
60 kg	(Azerbaijan) Elchin Ismayilov	(France) Cyril Soyer	(Belgium) Cédric Taymans (Georgia (country)) Nestor Khergiani
66 kg	(Ukraine) Renat Mirzaliyev	(Georgia (country)) David Margoshvili	(France) Larbi Benboudaoud (Slovakia) Jozef Krnáč
73 kg	(Ukraine) Gennadiy Bilodid	(Italy) Giuseppe Maddaloni	(France) Daniel Fernandes (Moldova) Nicolai Belokosov
81 kg	(Estonia) Aleksei Budõlin	(Russia) Lacha Pipia	(Turkey) Iraklı Uznadze (Spain) Óscar Fernández
90 kg	(Netherlands) Mark Huizinga	(Azerbaijan) Rasul Salimov	(France) Frédéric Demontfaucon (Estonia) Dmitri Budõlin
100 kg	(Israel) Ariel Ze'evi	(France) Ghislain Lemaire	(Netherlands) Elco van der Geest (Georgia (country)) Iveri Jikurauli
+100 kg	(Russia) Tamerlan Tmenov	(Italy) Denis Braidotti	(Turkey) Selim Tataroğlu (Georgia (country)) Aleksi Davitashvili
Open class	(Russia) Aleksandr Mikhailine	(Netherlands) Dennis van der Geest	(Hungary) Zoltán Csizmadia (Georgia (country)) Ramaz Chochosvili

=== Women ===
Event	Gold	Silver	Bronze
48 kg	(France) Frédérique Jossinet	(Romania) Laura Moise	(Belgium) Ann Simons (Italy) Giuseppina Macri
52 kg	(Belgium) Inge Clement	(Switzerland) Isabelle Schmutz	(France) Laëtitia Tignola (Romania) Ioana Maria Aluaș
57 kg	(Spain) Isabel Fernández	(Netherlands) Deborah Gravenstijn	(France) Barbara Harel (Italy) Cinzia Cavazzuti
63 kg	(Belgium) Gella Vandecaveye	(Austria) Claudia Heill	(Italy) Ylenia Scapin (Czech Republic) Radka Štusáková
70 kg	(Belgium) Ulla Werbrouck	(Spain) Cecilia Blanco	(Poland) Adriana Dadci (Austria) Mariela Spacek
78 kg	(France) Céline Lebrun	(Belgium) Heidi Rakels	(Netherlands) Claudia Zwiers (United Kingdom) Michelle Rogers
+78 kg	(Germany) Katja Gerber	(Russia) Tea Donguzashvili	(Belgium) Marie Elisabeth Veys (Federal Republic of Yugoslavia) Mara Kovačević
Open class	(Germany) Sandra Köppen	(France) Anne-Sophie Mondière	(United Kingdom) Karina Bryant (Russia) Irina Rodina

=== Medals table ===
Rank	Nation	Gold	Silver	Bronze	Total
1	Belgium	3	1	3	7
2	France	2	3	5	9
3	Russia	2	2	1	5
4	Germany	2	0	0	2
4	Ukraine	2	0	0	2
6	Netherlands	1	2	2	5
7	Spain	1	1	1	3
8	Azerbaijan	1	1	0	2
9	Estonia	1	0	1	1
10	Israel	1	0	0	1
11	Italy	0	2	3	5
12	Georgia	0	1	4	5
13	Austria	0	1	1	2
13	Romania	0	1	1	2
15	Switzerland	0	1	0	1
16	Great Britain	0	0	2	2
16	Turkey	0	0	2	2
18	Czech Republic	0	0	1	1
18	Hungary	0	0	1	1
18	Moldova	0	0	1	1
18	Poland	0	0	1	1
18	Slovakia	0	0	1	1
18	FR Yugoslavia	0	0	1	1

== Results overview ==
=== Men ===
==== 60 kg ====
Position	Judoka	Country
1.	Elchin Ismayilov	Azerbaijan
2.	Cyril Soyer	France
3.	Cédric Taymans	Belgium
3.	Nestor Khergiani	Georgia
5.	Lavrentis Alexanidis	Greece
5.	Siarhei Novikov	Belarus
7.	Ruslan Mirzaliyev	Ukraine
7.	Jacek Cyran	Poland

==== 66 kg ====
Position	Judoka	Country
1.	Renat Mirzaliyev	Ukraine
2.	David Margoshvili	Georgia
3.	Larbi Benboudaoud	France
3.	Jozef Krnáč	Slovakia
5.	Miloš Mijalković	FR Yugoslavia
5.	Denis Kozlovs	Latvia
7.	Georgi Georgiev	Bulgaria
7.	Gábor Neu	Hungary

==== 73 kg ====
Position	Judoka	Country
1.	Gennadiy Bilodid	Ukraine
2.	Giuseppe Maddaloni	Italy
3.	Daniel Fernandes	France
3.	Nicolai Belokosov	Moldova
5.	Evgeni Karpoukhine	Russia
5.	Krzysztof Wiłkomirski	Poland
7.	Koen Sleeckx	Belgium
7.	Miklós Illyés	Hungary

==== 81 kg ====
Position	Judoka	Country
1.	Aleksei Budõlin	Estonia
2.	Lacha Pipia	Russia
3.	Iraklı Uznadze	Turkey
3.	Óscar Fernández	Spain
5.	Valentin Knobloch	Germany
5.	Bronisław Wołkowicz	Poland
7.	Darcel Yandzi	France
7.	Luke Preston	Great Britain

==== 90 kg ====
Position	Judoka	Country
1.	Mark Huizinga	Netherlands
2.	Rasul Salimov	Azerbaijan
3.	Frédéric Demontfaucon	France
3.	Dmitri Budõlin	Estonia
5.	Przemysław Matyjaszek	Poland
5.	Khasanbi Taov	Russia
7.	Valentyn Grekov	Ukraine
7.	Hrvoje Panžić	Croatia

==== 100 kg ====
Position	Judoka	Country
1.	Ariel Ze'evi	Israel
2.	Ghislain Lemaire	France
3.	Elco van der Geest	Netherlands
3.	Iveri Jikurauli	Georgia
5.	Daniel Gürschner	Germany
5.	Timo Peltola	Finland
7.	Radu Ivan	Romania
7.	Damjan Petek	Slovenia

==== +100 kg ====
Position	Judoka	Country
1.	Tamerlan Tmenov	Russia
2.	Denis Braidotti	Italy
3.	Selim Tataroğlu	Turkey
3.	Aleksi Davitashvili	Georgia
5.	Jérôme Dreyfus	France
5.	Ruslan Sharapov	Belarus
7.	Gabriel Munteanu	Romania
7.	Vassilios Iliadis	Greece

==== Open class ====
Position	Judoka	Country
1.	Aleksandr Mikhailine	Russia
2.	Dennis van der Geest	Netherlands
3.	Zoltán Csizmadia	Hungary
3.	Ramaz Chochosvili	Georgia
5.	Franz Birkfellner	Austria
5.	Georgi Tonkov	Bulgaria
7.	Jérôme Dreyfus	France
7.	Gabriel Munteanu	Romania

=== Women ===
==== 48 kg ====
Position	Judoka	Country
1.	Frédérique Jossinet	France
2.	Laura Moise	Romania
3.	Ann Simons	Belgium
3.	Giuseppina Macri	Italy
5.	Vanesa Arenas	Spain
5.	Anna Żemła	Poland
7.	Severine Pesch	Germany
7.	Neşe Şensoy	Turkey

==== 52 kg ====
Position	Judoka	Country
1.	Inge Clement	Belgium
2.	Isabelle Schmutz	Switzerland
3.	Laëtitia Tignola	France
3.	Ioana Maria Aluaș	Romania
5.	Georgina Singleton	Great Britain
5.	Kristine Najaryan	Armenia
7.	Ana Carrascosa	Spain
7.	Carolina Johansson	Sweden

==== 57 kg ====
Position	Judoka	Country
1.	Isabel Fernández	Spain
2.	Deborah Gravenstijn	Netherlands
3.	Barbara Harel	France
3.	Cinzia Cavazzuti	Italy
5.	Michaela Vernerová	Czech Republic
5.	Pernilla Andersson	Sweden
7.	Jenni Brien	Great Britain
7.	Lena Göldi	Switzerland

==== 63 kg ====
Position	Judoka	Country
1.	Gella Vandecaveye	Belgium
2.	Claudia Heill	Austria
3.	Ylenia Scapin	Italy
3.	Radka Štusáková	Czech Republic
5.	Anna Saraeva	Russia
5.	Sara Álvarez	Spain
7.	Daniëlle Vriezema	Netherlands
7.	Bianca Geerdts	Germany

==== 70 kg ====
Position	Judoka	Country
1.	Ulla Werbrouck	Belgium
2.	Cecilia Blanco	Spain
3.	Adriana Dadci	Poland
3.	Mariela Spacek	Austria
5.	Amanda Costello	Great Britain
5.	Yulia Semenova	Russia
7.	Nicky Boontje	Netherlands
7.	Andrea Pokorná-Pažoutová	Czech Republic

==== 78 kg ====
Position	Judoka	Country
1.	Céline Lebrun	France
2.	Heidi Rakels	Belgium
3.	Claudia Zwiers	Netherlands
3.	Michelle Rogers	Great Britain
5.	Anastasiya Matrosova	Ukraine
5.	Polina Chekanina	Russia
7.	Annett Böhm	Germany
7.	Catarina Rodrigues	Portugal

==== +78 kg ====
Position	Judoka	Country
1.	Katja Gerber	Germany
2.	Tea Donguzashvili	Russia
3.	Marie Elisabeth Veys	Belgium
3.	Mara Kovačević	FR Yugoslavia
5.	Linda Marguerite	France
5.	Susana Somolinos	Spain
7.	Simone Callender	Great Britain
7.	Elena Shabamovitch	Belarus

==== Open class ====
Position	Judoka	Country
1.	Sandra Köppen	Germany
2.	Anne-Sophie Mondière	France
3.	Karina Bryant	Great Britain
3.	Irina Rodina	Russia
5.	Mara Kovačević	FR Yugoslavia
5.	Clementina Papa	Italy
7.	Brigitte Olivier	Belgium
7.	Karin Kienhuis	Netherlands
