= 1994 European Judo Championships =

1994 Judo European Judo Championships
- Location: Gdańsk, Poland
- Dates: 19–22 May 1994

Competition at external databases
- Links: JudoInside

The 1994 European Judo Championships were the 5th edition of the European Judo Championships, and were held in Gdańsk, Poland from 19 to 22 May 1994.

== Medal overview ==
=== Men ===
Event	Gold	Silver	Bronze
60 kg	(Italy) Girolamo Giovinazzo	(Azerbaijan) Nazim Huseynov	(Georgia (country)) Giorgi Revazishvili (France) Franck Chambilly
65 kg	(Russia) Vladimir Dratchko	(Poland) Jarosław Lewak	(Turkey) Salim Abanoz (France) Benoît Campargue
71 kg	(Russia) Sergei Kosmynin	(France) Patrick Rosso	(Germany) René Sporleder (Hungary) Bertalan Hajtós
78 kg	(United Kingdom) Ryan Birch	(Belgium) Johan Laats	(Netherlands) Mark Huizinga (Austria) Patrick Reiter
86 kg	(Russia) Oleg Maltsev	(France) Vincenzo Carabetta	(Romania) Adrian Croitoru (Georgia (country)) Iveri Jikurauli
95 kg	(Poland) Paweł Nastula	(United Kingdom) Raymond Stevens	(Germany) Mike Hax (Russia) Dmitri Sergeyev
+95 kg	(France) David Douillet	(Poland) Rafał Kubacki	(Turkey) Selim Tataroğlu (Germany) Frank Möller
Open class	(France) Laurent Crost	(Belgium) Harry Van Barneveld	(Russia) Evgeni Pechurov (Georgia (country)) Alexander Davitashvili

=== Women ===
Event	Gold	Silver	Bronze
48 kg	(Spain) Yolanda Soler	(France) Sylvie Meloux	(Russia) Tatiana Kouvchinova (Portugal) Justina Pinheiro
52 kg	(Poland) Ewa Larysa Krause	(Italy) Alessandra Giungi	(Germany) Alexa Von Schwichow (United Kingdom) Deborah Allan
56 kg	(Netherlands) Jessica Gal	(United Kingdom) Nicola Fairbrother	(France) Magali Baton (Sweden) Ursula Myrén
61 kg	(Belgium) Gella Vandecaveye	(United Kingdom) Diane Bell	(Slovakia) Miroslava Jánošíková (Spain) Miriam Blasco
66 kg	(United Kingdom) Rowena Sweatman	(Austria) Anneliese Anglberger	(Netherlands) Claudia Zwiers (Czech Republic) Radka Štusáková
72 kg	(Belgium) Ulla Werbrouck	(France) Estha Essombe	(United Kingdom) Kate Howey (Spain) Cristina Curto
+72 kg	(Netherlands) Angelique Seriese	(Poland) Beata Maksymow	(Russia) Svetlana Goundarenko (Spain) Raquel Barrientos
Open class	(Netherlands) Monique van der Lee	(France) Christine Cicot	(Poland) Beata Maksymow (Russia) Irina Rodina

=== Medal table ===
Rank	Nation	Gold	Silver	Bronze	Total
1	Russia	3	0	5	8
2	Netherlands	3	0	2	5
3	France	2	5	3	10
4	Great Britain	2	3	2	7
5	Poland	2	3	1	6
6	Belgium	2	2	0	4
7	Italy	1	1	0	2
8	Spain	1	0	3	4
9	Austria	0	1	1	2
10	Azerbaijan	0	1	0	1
11	Georgia	0	0	3	3
11	Germany	0	0	3	3
13	Hungary	0	0	2	2
13	Turkey	0	0	2	2
15	Czech Republic	0	0	1	1
15	Portugal	0	0	1	1
15	Romania	0	0	1	1
15	Slovakia	0	0	1	1
15	Sweden	0	0	1	1
Totals (19 entries)		16	16	32	64

== Results overview ==
=== Men ===
==== 60 kg ====
Position	Judoka	Country
1.	Girolamo Giovinazzo	Italy
2.	Nazim Huseynov	Azerbaijan
3.	Giorgi Revazishvili	Georgia
3.	Franck Chambilly	France
5.	Rashad Mammadov	Belarus
5.	Tinav Ahmedov	Russia
7.	Marek Matuszek	Slovakia
7.	Roman Nováček	Czech Republic

==== 65 kg ====
Position	Judoka	Country
1.	Vladimir Dratchko	Russia
2.	Jarosław Lewak	Poland
3.	Salim Abanoz	Turkey
3.	Benoît Campargue	France
5.	Andrei Golban	Moldova
5.	Igor Koliev	Belarus
7.	Ernst Hofer	Austria
7.	Julian Davis	Great Britain

==== 71 kg ====
Position	Judoka	Country
1.	Sergei Kosmynin	Russia
2.	Patrick Rosso	France
3.	René Sporleder	Germany
3.	Bertalan Hajtós	Hungary
5.	Jorma Korhonen	Finland
5.	Josef Vensek	Czech Republic
7.	Thomas Schleicher	Austria
7.	Krzysztof Wojdan	Poland

==== 78 kg ====
Position	Judoka	Country
1.	Ryan Birch	Great Britain
2.	Johan Laats	Belgium
3.	Mark Huizinga	Netherlands
3.	Patrick Reiter	Austria
5.	Stefan Dott	Germany
5.	István Gulyás	Hungary
7.	Dario Romano	Italy
7.	Jamen Fatiev	Azerbaijan

==== 86 kg ====
Position	Judoka	Country
1.	Oleg Maltsev	Russia
2.	Vincenzo Carabetta	France
3.	Adrian Croitoru	Romania
3.	Iveri Jikurauli	Georgia
5.	Ruslan Mashurenko	Ukraine
5.	Apti Magomedov	Moldova
7.	Roy Poels	Netherlands
7.	Marek Pisula	Poland

==== 95 kg ====
Position	Judoka	Country
1.	Paweł Nastula	Poland
2.	Raymond Stevens	Great Britain
3.	Mike Hax	Germany
3.	Dmitri Sergeyev	Russia
5.	Leonid Svirid	Belarus
5.	Ben Sonnemans	Belgium
7.	Igor Gorbokon	Ukraine
7.	Pedro Soares	Portugal

==== +95 kg ====
Position	Judoka	Country
1.	David Douillet	France
2.	Rafał Kubacki	Poland
3.	Selim Tataroğlu	Turkey
3.	Imre Csösz	Hungary
5.	Murat Khasanov	Russia
5.	Igor Mueller	Luxembourg
7.	Harry Van Barneveld	Belgium
7.	Ruslan Sharapov	Belarus

==== Open class ====
Position	Judoka	Country
1.	Laurent Crost	France
2.	Harry Van Barneveld	Belgium
3.	Evgeni Pechurov	Russia
3.	Alexander Davitashvili	Georgia
5.	Ralf Koser	Germany
5.	Imre Csösz	Hungary
7.	Charalampos Papaioannou	Greece
7.	Stanislav Kosev	Ukraine

=== Women ===
==== 48 kg ====
Position	Judoka	Country
1.	Yolanda Soler	Spain
2.	Sylvie Meloux	France
3.	Tatiana Kouvchinova	Russia
3.	Justina Pinheiro	Portugal
5.	Giorgina Zanette	Italy
5.	Jana Perlberg	Germany
7.	Klára Vészi	Hungary
7.	Barbara Stäbler	Switzerland

==== 52 kg ====
Position	Judoka	Country
1.	Ewa Larysa Krause	Poland
2.	Alessandra Giungi	Italy
3.	Alexa Von Schwichow	Germany
3.	Deborah Allan	Great Britain
5.	Marina Kovriguina	Russia
5.	Paula Saldanha	Portugal
7.	Tatiana Gavrilova	Russia
7.	Hülya Şenyurt	Turkey

==== 56 kg ====
Position	Judoka	Country
1.	Jessica Gal	Netherlands
2.	Nicola Fairbrother	Great Britain
3.	Magali Baton	France
3.	Ursula Myrén	Sweden
5.	Alla Klimovich	Ukraine
5.	Filipa Cavalleri	Portugal
7.	Anita Kubica	Poland
7.	Inna Toropeeva	Belarus

==== 61 kg ====
Position	Judoka	Country
1.	Gella Vandecaveye	Belgium
2.	Diane Bell	Great Britain
3.	Miroslava Jánošíková	Slovakia
3.	Miriam Blasco	Spain
5.	Ilknur Kobaş	Turkey
5.	Susanne Profanter	Austria
7.	Camilla Williams	Sweden
7.	Ieva Klimašauskienė	Lithuania

==== 66 kg ====
Position	Judoka	Country
1.	Rowena Sweatman	Great Britain
2.	Anneliese Anglberger	Austria
3.	Claudia Zwiers	Netherlands
3.	Radka Štusáková	Czech Republic
5.	Catarina Rodrigues	Portugal
5.	Svetlana Selihanova	Belarus
7.	Isabelle Beauruelle	France
7.	Marimar Alcíbar	Spain

==== 72 kg ====
Position	Judoka	Country
1.	Ulla Werbrouck	Belgium
2.	Estha Essombe	France
3.	Kate Howey	Great Britain
3.	Cristina Curto	Spain
5.	Ylenia Scapin	Italy
5.	Tetyana Belajeva	Ukraine
7.	Karin Kienhuis	Netherlands
7.	Simona Richter	Romania

==== +72 kg ====
Position	Judoka	Country
1.	Angelique Seriese	Netherlands
2.	Beata Maksymow	Poland
3.	Svetlana Goundarenko	Russia
3.	Raquel Barrientos	Spain
5.	Donata Burgatta	Italy
5.	Josephine Horton	Great Britain
7.	Olga Tarasova	Belarus
7.	Svetlana Lysianskaya	Ukraine

==== Open class ====
Position	Judoka	Country
1.	Monique van der Lee	Netherlands
2.	Christine Cicot	France
3.	Beata Maksymow	Poland
3.	Irina Rodina	Russia
5.	Karin Kutz	Germany
5.	Svetlana Lysianskaya	Ukraine
7.	Karin Hefková	Slovakia
7.	Olga Tarasova	Belarus
