= 1997 European Judo Championships =

1997 Judo European Judo Championships
- Location: Ostend, Belgium
- Dates: 8–11 May 1997

Competition at external databases
- Links: JudoInside

The 1997 European Judo Championships were the 8th edition of the European Judo Championships, and were held in Ostend, Belgium from 8 to 11 May 1997.

== Medal overview ==
=== Men ===
Event	Gold	Silver	Bronze
60 kg	(Belarus) Rashad Mammadov	(France) Yacine Douma	(Italy) Girolamo Giovinazzo (Portugal) Pedro Caravana
65 kg	(Turkey) Hüseyin Özkan	(Georgia (country)) Giorgi Revazishvili	(France) Larbi Benboudaoud (United Kingdom) Julian Davis
71 kg	(Georgia (country)) Giorgi Vazagashvili	(Russia) Anatoly Laryukov	(France) Christophe Gagliano (United Kingdom) Danny Kingston
78 kg	(Belgium) Johan Laats	(France) Djamel Bouras	(Germany) Dirk Radszat (Austria) Patrick Reiter
86 kg	(Netherlands) Mark Huizinga	(Austria) Sergei Klischin	(Belgium) Daan De Cooman (Lithuania) Algimantas Merkevičius
95 kg	(Netherlands) Ben Sonnemans	(France) Ghislain Lemaire	(Romania) Radu Ivan (Federal Republic of Yugoslavia) Dano Pantić
+95 kg	(Turkey) Selim Tataroğlu	(Netherlands) Dennis van der Geest	(Belgium) Harry Van Barneveld (Poland) Rafał Kubacki
Open class	(Belgium) Harry Van Barneveld	(Germany) Volker Heyer	(Estonia) Indrek Pertelson (Turkey) Selim Tataroğlu

=== Women ===
Event	Gold	Silver	Bronze
48 kg	(France) Sylvie Meloux	(Germany) Anna-Maria Gradante	(Russia) Svetlana Komarova (Belarus) Tatiana Moskvina
52 kg	(Belgium) Inge Clement	(Belarus) Alena Karytskaya	(France) Marie-Claire Restoux (Russia) Lioudmila Khramova
56 kg	(Belgium) Marisabel Lomba	(Spain) Isabel Fernández	(France) Magali Baton (Poland) Beata Kucharzewska
61 kg	(Belgium) Gella Vandecaveye	(Czech Republic) Michaela Vernerová	(France) Séverine Vandenhende (Poland) Irena Tokarz
66 kg	(Germany) Yvonne Wansart	(Spain) Úrsula Martín	(Netherlands) Claudia Zwiers (United Kingdom) Kate Howey
72 kg	(Belgium) Ulla Werbrouck	(United Kingdom) Chloe Cowen	(Netherlands) Karin Kienhuis (Germany) Uta Kühnen
+72 kg	(Germany) Johanna Hagn	(United Kingdom) Michelle Rogers	(France) Céline Lebrun (Poland) Beata Maksymow
Open class	(Poland) Beata Maksymow	(Netherlands) Françoise Harteveld	(Spain) Raquel Barrientos (Belgium) Brigitte Olivier

=== Medal table ===
Rank	Nation	Gold	Silver	Bronze	Total
1	Belgium	6	0	3	9
2	Germany	2	2	2	6
2	Netherlands	2	2	2	6
4	Turkey	2	0	1	3
5	France	1	3	6	10
6	Belarus	1	2	1	4
7	Georgia	1	1	0	2
8	Poland	1	0	4	5
9	Great Britain	0	2	3	5
10	Spain	0	2	1	3
11	Austria	0	1	1	2
12	Czech Republic	0	1	0	1
13	Russia	0	0	2	2
14	Estonia	0	0	1	1
14	Italy	0	0	1	1
14	Lithuania	0	0	1	1
14	Portugal	0	0	1	1
14	Romania	0	0	1	1
14	Yugoslavia	0	0	1	1
Totals (19 entries)		16	16	32	64

== Results overview ==
=== Men ===
==== 60 kg ====
Position	Judoka	Country
1.	Rachad Mamedov	Belarus
2.	Yacine Douma	France
3.	Girolamo Giovinazzo	Italy
3.	Pedro Caravana	Portugal
5.	Sean Sullivan	Ireland
5.	Jamie Johnson	Great Britain
7.	Nestor Khergiani	Georgia
7.	Tamás Kovács	Hungary

==== 65 kg ====
Position	Judoka	Country
1.	Hüseyin Özkan	Turkey
2.	Giorgi Revazishvili	Georgia
3.	Larbi Benboudaoud	France
3.	Julian Davis	Great Britain
5.	József Csák	Hungary
5.	Gabriel Bengtsson	Sweden
7.	Aleksandr Shlyk	Belarus
7.	Michel Almeida	Portugal

==== 71 kg ====
Position	Judoka	Country
1.	Giorgi Vazagashvili	Georgia
2.	Anatoly Laryukov	Belarus
3.	Christophe Gagliano	France
3.	Danny Kingston	Great Britain
5.	Rafał Kozielewski	Poland
5.	Guilherme Bentes	Portugal
7.	Federico Cainero	Italy
7.	Vsevolods Zeļonijs	Latvia

==== 78 kg ====
Position	Judoka	Country
1.	Johan Laats	Belgium
2.	Djamel Bouras	France
3.	Dirk Radszat	Germany
3.	Patrick Reiter	Austria
5.	Aleksei Budõlin	Estonia
5.	German Abdulaev	Russia
7.	Matti Lattu	Finland
7.	Bertalan Hajtós	Hungary

==== 86 kg ====
Position	Judoka	Country
1.	Mark Huizinga	Netherlands
2.	Sergei Klischin	Austria
3.	Daan De Cooman	Belgium
3.	Algimantas Merkevičius	Lithuania
5.	Stéphane Nomis	France
5.	Artur Kejza	Poland
7.	Giorgi Tsmindashvili	Georgia
7.	Petr Lacina	Czech Republic

==== 95 kg ====
Position	Judoka	Country
1.	Ben Sonnemans	Netherlands
2.	Ghislain Lemaire	France
3.	Radu Ivan	Romania
3.	Dano Pantić	Yugoslavia
5.	Pedro Soares	Portugal
5.	Iveri Jikurauli	Georgia
7.	Patric Nebhuth	Germany
7.	Luigi Guido	Italy

==== +95 kg ====
Position	Judoka	Country
1.	Selim Tataroğlu	Turkey
2.	Dennis van der Geest	Netherlands
3.	Harry Van Barneveld	Belgium
3.	Rafał Kubacki	Poland
5.	Ernesto Pérez	Spain
5.	Imre Csösz	Hungary
7.	Ralf Koser	Germany
7.	Indrek Pertelson	Estonia

==== Open class ====
Position	Judoka	Country
1.	Harry Van Barneveld	Belgium
2.	Volker Heyer	Germany
3.	Indrek Pertelson	Estonia
3.	Selim Tataroğlu	Turkey
5.	Dennis van der Geest	Netherlands
5.	Imre Csösz	Hungary
7.	Alexander Davitashvili	Georgia
7.	Leonid Svirid	Belarus

=== Women ===
==== 48 kg ====
Position	Judoka	Country
1.	Sylvie Meloux	France
2.	Anna-Maria Gradante	Germany
3.	Svetlana Komarova	Russia
3.	Tatiana Moskvina	Belarus
5.	Joyce Heron	Great Britain
5.	Laura Moise	Romania
7.	Barbara Krzywda	Poland
7.	Justina Pinheiro	Portugal

==== 52 kg ====
Position	Judoka	Country
1.	Inge Clement	Belgium
2.	Alena Karytskaya	Belarus
3.	Marie-Claire Restoux	France
3.	Lioudmila Khramova	Russia
5.	Tamara Meijer	Netherlands
5.	Almudena Muñoz	Spain
7.	Giuseppina Macrì	Italy
7.	Klára Vészi	Hungary

==== 56 kg ====
Position	Judoka	Country
1.	Marisabel Lomba	Belgium
2.	Isabel Fernández	Spain
3.	Magali Baton	France
3.	Beata Kucharzewska	Poland
5.	Jessica Gal	Netherlands
5.	Zulfiyya Huseinova	Azerbaijan
7.	Nicola Fairbrother	Great Britain
7.	Pernilla Andersson	Sweden

==== 61 kg ====
Position	Judoka	Country
1.	Gella Vandecaveye	Belgium
2.	Michaela Vernerová	Czech Republic
3.	Séverine Vandenhende	France
3.	Irena Tokarz	Poland
5.	Maddalena Sorrentino	Italy
5.	Cheryle Peel	Great Britain
7.	Sara Álvarez	Spain
7.	Marina Dekevitch	Belarus

==== 66 kg ====
Position	Judoka	Country
1.	Yvonne Wansart	Germany
2.	Úrsula Martín	Spain
3.	Claudia Zwiers	Netherlands
3.	Kate Howey	Great Britain
5.	Emanuela Pierantozzi	Italy
5.	Nada Ognjenović	Yugoslavia
7.	Agata Mróz	Ukraine
7.	Anne Herlenius	Sweden

==== 72 kg ====
Position	Judoka	Country
1.	Ulla Werbrouck	Belgium
2.	Chloe Cowen	Great Britain
3.	Karin Kienhuis	Netherlands
3.	Uta Kühnen	Germany
5.	Anna Lámfalusy	Hungary
5.	Simona Richter	Romania
7.	Estha Essombe	France
7.	María Villar	Spain

==== +72 kg ====
Position	Judoka	Country
1.	Johanna Hagn	Germany
2.	Michelle Rogers	Great Britain
3.	Céline Lebrun	France
3.	Beata Maksymow	Poland
5.	Cindy Sneevliet	Netherlands
5.	Irina Rodina	Russia
7.	Emine Nur Gökdemir	Turkey
7.	Mara Kovačević	Yugoslavia

==== Open class ====
Position	Judoka	Country
1.	Beata Maksymow	Poland
2.	Françoise Harteveld	Netherlands
3.	Raquel Barrientos	Spain
3.	Brigitte Olivier	Belgium
5.	Mara Kovačević	Yugoslavia
5.	Simona Richter	Romania
7.	Gaëlle Potel	France
7.	Tea Donguzashvili	Russia
