= Lattu =

Lattu is a Hindi-Urdu word as well as a Finnish surname.

== Toys ==
- Lattu, a spinning top

== People ==
- Matti Lattu (born 1971), Finnish judoka
- Pete Lattu (born 1979), Finnish actor

== See also ==
- Meanings of minor planet names: 30001–31000#775
