= Andrew Collett =

Australian Olympic judoka

Personal information
- Born: 8 November 1978 (age 47) Melbourne, Victoria, Australia
- Occupation: Judoka
- Height: 1.73 m (5 ft 8 in)
- Weight: 73 kg (161 lb)

Sport
- Country: Australia
- Sport: Judo
- Event: 73 kg
- Club: Caulfield Judo Club
- Coached by: Arthur Moorshead

Profile at external databases
- IJF: 52904
- JudoInside.com: 8794

Andrew Collett (born 8 November 1978) is an Australian judoka, who competed in the men's lightweight category. He held seven Australian senior titles in his own division, picked up a total of sixteen medals in his career, including two golds from the Oceania Championships, and represented his nation Australia in two editions of the Olympic Games (2000 and 2004). Throughout his sporting career, Collett trained full-time for Caulfield Judo Club in his native Melbourne, under head coach and sensei Arthur Moorshead (later died in 2010).

Collett made his official debut at the 2000 Summer Olympics in Sydney, where he competed for the host nation team in the men's half-lightweight class (66 kg). By the mighty commotion of the home crowd inside Sydney Convention and Exhibition Centre, Collett threw Aruba's Javier Wanga on the tatami with a perfect ippon victory in his opening match, before losing out to his next opponent Zhang Guangjun of China, who tremendously pinned him in a sumi gaeshi (corner reversal) throw at one minute and six seconds.

At the 2004 Summer Olympics in Athens, Collett qualified for his second Australian squad in the men's lightweight class (73 kg), by placing second and receiving a berth from the Oceania Championships in Nouméa, New Caledonia. Unlike his previous Olympics, Collett conceded with a shido penalty and suffered an early exit to an ippon victory and a sumi gaeshi throw from Poland's Krzysztof Wiłkomirski two minutes and forty-six seconds into their opening match.
