= Amukoto =

Amukoto is a surname. Notable people with the surname include:

- Armas Amukoto (born 1973), Namibian politician
- Twelikondjele Amukoto (born 1991), Namibian football and futsal player

== See also ==
- Akoto
