= Kim Hyuk =

South Korean judoka (born 1972)

Personal information
- Born: 19 July 1972 (age 54)
- Occupation: Judoka

Korean name
- Hangul: 김혁
- Hanja: 金赫
- RR: Gim Hyeok
- MR: Kim Hyŏk

Sport
- Country: South Korea
- Sport: Judo
- Weight class: ‍–‍60 kg, ‍–‍65 kg

Achievements and titles
- World Champ.: (gold) (1997)
- Asian Champ.: (gold) (1994)
Medal record
Men's judo
Representing South Korea
World Championships
Gold medal – first place	1997 Paris	‍–‍65 kg
Asian Games
Gold medal – first place	1994 Hiroshima	‍–‍60 kg
World Juniors Championships
Bronze medal – third place	1992 Buenos Aires	‍–‍60 kg
Summer Universiade
Gold medal – first place	1995 Fukuoka	‍–‍60 kg
Goodwill Games
Gold medal – first place	1994 Saint Petersburg	‍–‍60 kg

Profile at external databases
- IJF: 1929
- JudoInside.com: 3695
- Updated on 31 March 2024

Kim Hyuk (born 17 July 1972) is a South Korean judoka. He won a gold medal in the lightweight (65 kg) division at the 1997 World Judo Championships in Paris. In 1994, Kim won five international competitions including Paris Open (Tournoi de Paris), the Asian Games in Hiroshima, Japan and the Goodwill Games in St. Petersburg, Russia.

Kim Hyuk is currently the assistant coach of the South Korean women's judo team for the 2008 Summer Olympics.

== Personal life ==
In 1999, Kim married a Japanese female judoka Yuko Emoto, the gold medalist at the 1996 Summer Olympics.
