= Judo at the 1994 Goodwill Games =

Judo competition

The Judo competition in the 1994 Goodwill Games were held in Saint Petersburg, Russia 26 July 1994.

== Medal overview ==
=== Men's events ===
Event	Gold	Silver	Bronze
Extra-lightweight (60 kg)	Kim Hyuk (KOR)	Yasuo Otoguro (JPN)	Nikolay Oyegin (RUS)
Extra-lightweight (60 kg)	Kim Hyuk (KOR)	Yasuo Otoguro (JPN)	Clifton Sunada (USA)
Half-lightweight (65 kg)	Vladimir Dratchko (RUS)	Vsevolods Zeļonijs (LAT)	József Csák (HUN)
Half-lightweight (65 kg)	Vladimir Dratchko (RUS)	Vsevolods Zeļonijs (LAT)	Ryuta Yumiya (JPN)
Lightweight (71 kg)	Chung Hoon (KOR)	Thomas Schleicher (AUT)	Yoshihide Tsuchiya (JPN)
Lightweight (71 kg)	Chung Hoon (KOR)	Thomas Schleicher (AUT)	Jimmy Pedro (USA)
Half-middleweight (78 kg)	Yoon Dong-Sik (KOR)	Yasuhiro Nakashima (JPN)	Johan Laats (BEL)
Half-middleweight (78 kg)	Yoon Dong-Sik (KOR)	Yasuhiro Nakashima (JPN)	Manuel Méndez (ESP)
Heavyweight (86 kg)	Tagir Abdulaev (RUS)	Fernando González (ESP)	Sven Helbing (GER)
Heavyweight (86 kg)	Tagir Abdulaev (RUS)	Fernando González (ESP)	Nicolas Gill (CAN)
Heavyweight (95 kg)	Detlef Knorrek (GER)	Leonid Svirid (BLR)	Yuji Ikoma (JPN)
Heavyweight (95 kg)	Detlef Knorrek (GER)	Leonid Svirid (BLR)	Evgeni Pechurov (RUS)
Heavyweight (+95 kg)	Yoshiharu Makishi (JPN)	Indrek Pertelson (EST)	Harry Van Barneveld (BEL)
Heavyweight (+95 kg)	Yoshiharu Makishi (JPN)	Indrek Pertelson (EST)	Volker Heyer (GER)

=== Women's events ===
Event	Gold	Silver	Bronze
Extra-lightweight (61 kg)	Jung Sung-Sook (KOR)	Aneta Arak (POL)	Gella Vandecaveye (BEL)
Extra-lightweight (61 kg)	Jung Sung-Sook (KOR)	Aneta Arak (POL)	Yelena Petrova (RUS)

=== Medals table ===
Rank	Nation	Gold	Silver	Bronze	Total
1	South Korea	4	0	0	4
2	Russia	2	0	3	5
3	Japan	1	2	3	6
4	Germany	1	0	2	3
5	Spain	0	1	1	2
6	Austria	0	1	0	1
6	Belarus	0	1	0	1
6	Estonia	0	1	0	1
6	Latvia	0	1	0	1
6	Poland	0	1	0	1
11	Belgium	0	0	3	3
12	United States	0	0	2	2
13	Canada	0	0	1	1
13	Hungary	0	0	1	1
Totals (14 entries)		8	8	16	32
