= Pipia =

Pipia is a surname. Notable people with the surname include:

- Agustín Pipia (1660–1730), Spanish Master of the Order of Preachers
- Lasha Pipia (1975–2021), Russian judoka
- Roman Pipia (born 1966), Georgian businessman
- Vakhtang Pipia (born 1960), Abkhaz politician
