= Sporleder =

Sporleder is a surname. Notable people with the name include:

- Gregory Sporleder (born 1964), American actor and filmmaker
- Pedro Sporleder (born 1971), Argentine rugby union footballer
- René Sporleder (born 1969), German judoka
