= Judo at the 1996 Summer Olympics – Women's 66 kg =

Women's 66 kg at the Games of the XXVI Olympiad
- Venue: Georgia World Congress Center
- Date: 22 July 1996
- Competitors: 20 from 20 nations

Medalists
1st place, gold medalist(s)		Cho Min-sun	South Korea
2nd place, silver medalist(s)		Aneta Szczepańska	Poland
3rd place, bronze medalist(s)		Wang Xianbo	China
3rd place, bronze medalist(s)		Claudia Zwiers	Netherlands

These are the results of the women's 66 kg (also known as middleweight) competition in judo at the 1996 Summer Olympics in Atlanta, Georgia. A total of 20 women competed in this event, limited to jūdōka whose body weight was less than, or equal to, 66 kilograms. Competition took place on July 22 of 1996 in the Georgia World Congress Center.

== Results ==
The gold and silver medalists were determined by the final match of the main single-elimination bracket.

Round of 32
Radka Štusáková (CZE)	L
Risa Kazumi (JPN)	W
Cho Min-Sun (KOR)	W
Rosicleia Campos (BRA)	L
Odalis Revé (CUB)	W
Carly Dixon (AUS)	L
Anja Von Rekowski (GER)	W
Emanuela Pierantozzi (ITA)	L

Round of 16
Liliko Ogasawara (USA)	L
Claudia Zwiers (NED)	W
Risa Kazumi (JPN)	L
Wu Mei-Ling (TPE)	W
Priscilla Cherry (MRI)	L
Dulce Piña (DOM)	W
Wang Xianbo (CHN)	L
Cho Min-Sun (KOR)	W
Elena Kotelnikova (RUS)	L
Mariela Spacek (AUT)	W
Alice Dubois (FRA)	W
Odalis Revé (CUB)	L
Melanie Engoang (GAB)	L
Aneta Szczepańska (POL)	W
Anja Von Rekowski (GER)	L
Rowena Sweatman (GBR)	W

Quarterfinals
Claudia Zwiers (NED)	W
Wu Mei-Ling (TPE)	L
Dulce Piña (DOM)	L
Cho Min-Sun (KOR)	W
Mariela Spacek (AUT)	L
Alice Dubois (FRA)	W
Aneta Szczepańska (POL)	W
Rowena Sweatman (GBR)	L

Semifinals
Claudia Zwiers (NED)	L
Cho Min-Sun (KOR)	W
Alice Dubois (FRA)	L
Aneta Szczepańska (POL)	W

Gold medal final
Cho Min-Sun (KOR)	W
Aneta Szczepańska (POL)	L

=== Repechage ===
The losing semifinalists as well as those judoka eliminated in earlier rounds by the four semifinalists of the main bracket advanced to the repechage. These matches determined the two bronze medalists for the event.

First round
Campos (BRA)	L
Wang (CHN)	W

Second round
Ogasawara (USA)	W
Wu (TPE)	L
Wang (CHN)	W
Piña (DOM)	L
Revé (CUB)	W
Spacek (AUT)	L
Engoang (GAB)	L
Sweatman (GBR)	W

Third round
Ogasawara (USA)	L
Wang (CHN)	W
Revé (CUB)	W
Sweatman (GBR)	L

Bronze medal finals
Wang (CHN)	W
Dubois (FRA)	L
Revé (CUB)	L
Zwiers (NED)	W
