= Tonkov =

Tonkov (Cyrillic: Тонков) is a surname. Notable people with that name include:

- Georgi Tonkov (born 1975), Bulgarian judoka.
- Pavel Tonkov (born 1969), Russian cyclist
