= Cainero =

Cainero is an Italian surname from Friuli-Venezia Giulia. Notable people with the surname include:

- Chiara Cainero (born 1978), Italian sports shooter
- Federico Cainero (born 1969), Italian judoka
