= Stéphane Nomis =

French judoka

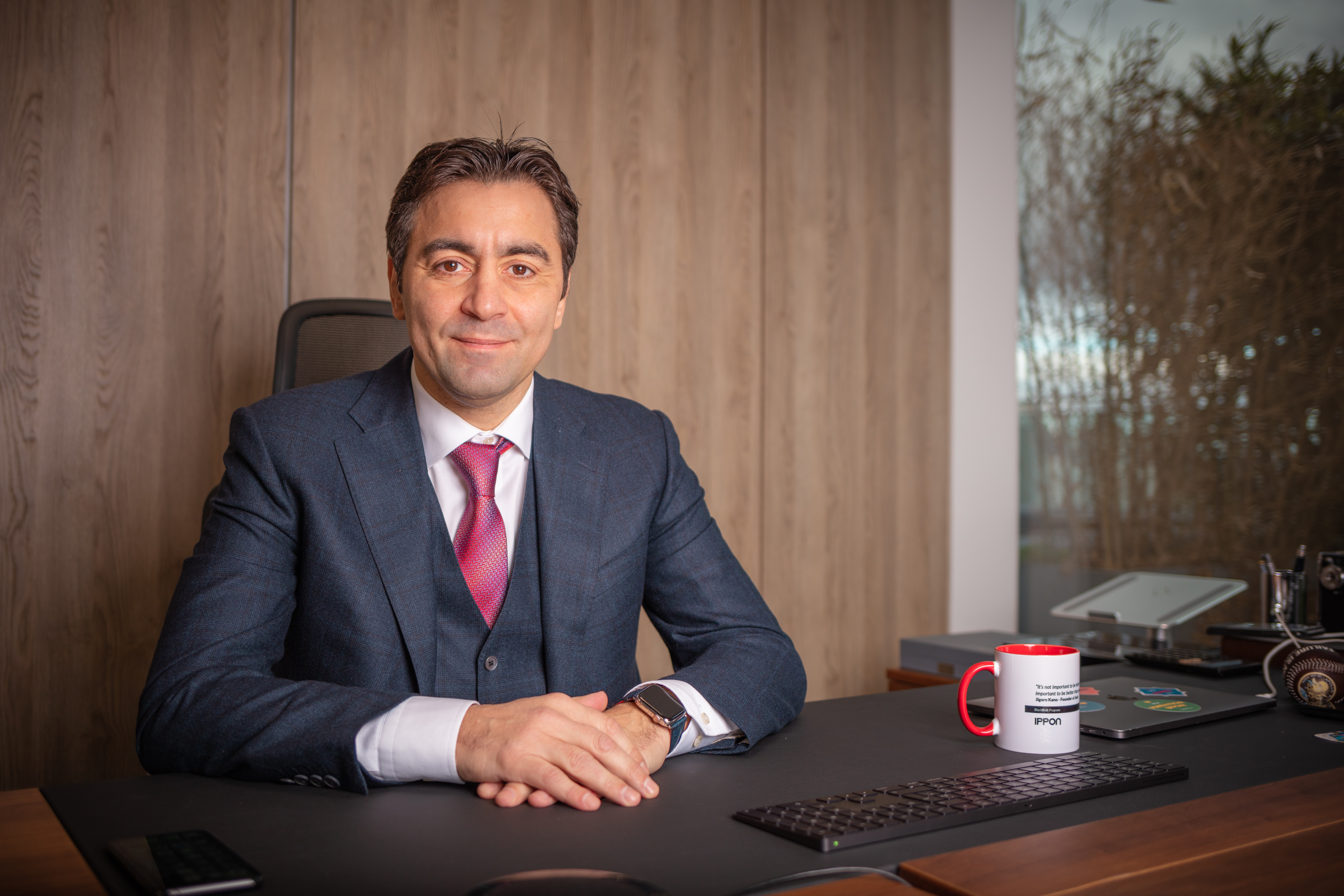
- Born: Stéphane Nomis; October 23, 1970 (age 54); Versailles, France
- Nationality: French
- Division: Middleweight
- Style: Judo
- Rank: Black belt in Judo (4th Dan)
- Years active: 1995-1999

Stéphane Nomis born on October 23, 1970, in Versailles, is a former French judoka, member of the French national team from 1990 to 1999, who became an entrepreneur by creating Ippon Technologies. He is also involved in associations, creating the Ippon Foundation to fight against the digital divide.

Since November 2020, he has been President of the French Judo Federation.

In January 2023, he was promoted to Chevalier de la Légion d'honneur.

== Sporting career ==
From 1990 to 1999, he trains as a professional judoka at INSEP and is part of the France national team under the direction of René Rambier at the French Federation of Judo. He trains with David Douillet, Djamel Bouras and Larbi Benboudaoud. Nomis earned medals in many championships, including a gold medal at the French Championships and a bronze medal at the European Championships. He managed to reach the finals of the French championships, and after a bronze medal at the tournament in Paris, he qualified for the European Championships for the second time. He brought his career to an end in 1999.

== Business career ==
In 1999, Nomis got a job as a salesman. In 2002, he created Ippon Technologies, an IT engineering services company. The firm is now present in Paris, New York, Washington, Richmond, Moscow, Nantes, Bordeaux, Lyon, Toulouse, and Melbourne, and now has more than 500 consultants.

== Achievements ==
| Year | Tournament | Place | Weight class |
|---|---|---|---|
| 1997 | European Judo Championships | 5th | Middleweight (86 kg) |
| 1997 | Mediterranean Games | 2nd | Middleweight (86 kg) |
| 1998 | European Judo Championships | 7th | -81 kg |
