= Marek Pisula =

Polish judoka

Personal information
- Born: 6 February 1969 (age 57) Wroclaw, Poland

Sport
- Sport: Judo
Medal record
Representing Poland
Summer Universiade
Bronze medal – third place	1995 Fukuoka	Team

Marek Paweł Pisula (born 6 February 1969) is a Polish judoka. He competed in the men's middleweight event at the 1996 Summer Olympics.

== Achievements ==
Year	Tournament	Place	Weight class
1994	European Judo Championships	7th	Middleweight (86 kg)
