= Daan De Cooman =

Belgian judoka

Personal information
- Born: 17 April 1974 (age 52)
- Occupation: Judoka

Sport
- Sport: Judo
Medal record
Men's judo
Representing Belgium
European Championships
Gold medal – first place	1999 Bratislava	90 kg
Bronze medal – third place	1997 Ostend	86 kg

Profile at external databases
- JudoInside.com: 152

Daan De Cooman (born 17 April 1974) is a Belgian judoka.

== Achievements ==
Year	Tournament	Place	Weight class
1999	European Judo Championships	1st	Middleweight (90 kg)
1998	European Judo Championships	5th	Middleweight (90 kg)
1997	European Judo Championships	3rd	Middleweight (86 kg)
