= Larbi Benboudaoud =

French judoka (born 1974)

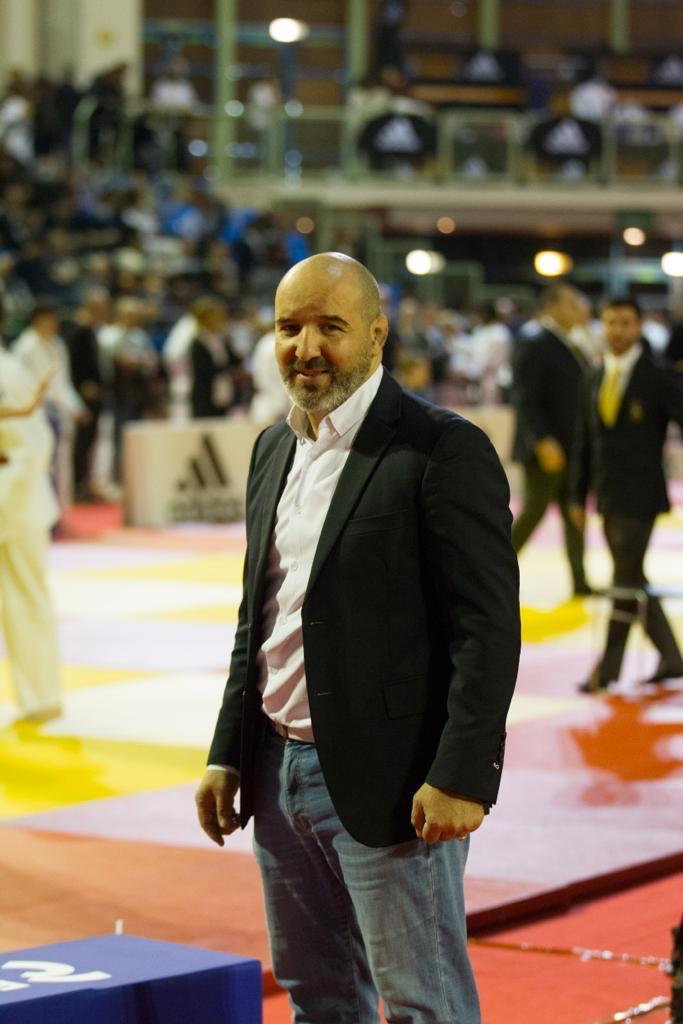

Personal information
- Born: 5 March 1974 (age 52) Bordj Zemoura, Algeria
- Occupation: Judoka

Sport
- Country: France
- Sport: Judo
- Weight class: –66 kg

Achievements and titles
- Olympic Games: (silver) (2000)
- World Champ.: (1999)
- European Champ.: (gold) (1998, 1999)
Medal record
Men's judo
Representing France
Olympic Games
Silver medal – second place	2000 Sydney	‍–‍66 kg
World Championships
Gold medal – first place	1999 Birmingham	‍–‍66 kg
Silver medal – second place	1997 Paris	‍–‍65 kg
Silver medal – second place	2003 Osaka	‍–‍66 kg
European Championships
Gold medal – first place	1998 Oviedo	‍–‍66 kg
Gold medal – first place	1999 Bratislava	‍–‍66 kg
Bronze medal – third place	1996 The Hague	‍–‍65 kg
Bronze medal – third place	1997 Oostende	‍–‍65 kg
Bronze medal – third place	2001 Paris	‍–‍66 kg
European Junior Championships
Bronze medal – third place	1994 Lisbon	‍–‍65 kg

Profile at external databases
- IJF: 714
- JudoInside.com: 341
- Updated on 31 May 2023

Larbi Benboudaoud (born 5 March 1974) is a French judoka, who won the silver medal in the half lightweight (‍–‍66 kg) division at the 2000 Summer Olympics in Sydney, Australia. In the final he was defeated by Turkey's Huseyin Ozkan. He was the World and European champion in the same weight category in 1999.

== Achievements ==
Year	Tournament	Place	Weight class
2003	World Judo Championships	2nd	Half lightweight (66 kg)
2001	European Judo Championships	3rd	Half lightweight (66 kg)
2000	Olympic Games	2nd	Half lightweight (66 kg)
1999	World Judo Championships	1st	Half lightweight (66 kg)
1999	European Judo Championships	1st	Half lightweight (66 kg)
1998	European Judo Championships	1st	Half lightweight (66 kg)
1997	World Judo Championships	2nd	Half lightweight (65 kg)
1997	European Judo Championships	3rd	Half lightweight (65 kg)
1996	European Judo Championships	3rd	Half lightweight (65 kg)
