= Damjan Petek =

Slovenian judoka

Damjan Petek (born 19 March 1973) is a Slovenian judoka.

== Achievements ==
Year	Tournament	Place	Weight class
2002	European Judo Championships	7th	Half heavyweight (100 kg)
2001	European Judo Championships	7th	Half heavyweight (100 kg)
1997	Mediterranean Games	2nd	Half heavyweight (95 kg)
