= Priscilla Cherry =

Mauritian judoka (born 1971)

Personal information
- Nationality: Mauritian
- Born: 9 August 1971 (age 54)

Sport
- Sport: Judo

Priscilla Cherry (born 9 August 1971) is a Mauritian judoka. She competed in the women's middleweight event at the 1996 Summer Olympics.
