= German Abdulaev =

Russian judoka

German Abdulaev is a Russian judoka.

== Achievements ==
Year	Tournament	Place	Weight class
1998	European Judo Championships	7th	Half middleweight (81 kg)
1997	European Judo Championships	5th	Half middleweight (78 kg)
