= Denis Braidotti =

Italian judoka

Medal record

Men's judo

European Championships
Silver medal – second place	2001 Paris	+100 kg

Denis Braidotti (born 31 July 1972) is an Italian international judoka.

After his career with the Italian national team, he moved to Malta in 2019 to become the head coach of the Maltese national team.

Braidotti is 6th Dan judoka.

== Achievements ==
Year	Tournament	Place	Weight class
2003	European Judo Championships	7th	Open class
2001	European Judo Championships	2nd	Heavyweight (+100 kg)
2001	Mediterranean Games	1st	Heavyweight (+100 kg)
1997	Mediterranean Games	3rd	Heavyweight (+95 kg)
