= Dmitri Budõlin =

Estonian judoka (born 1974)

Personal information
- Born: 1 March 1974 (age 52)
- Occupation: Judoka

Sport
- Sport: Judo
Medal record
Men's judo
European Championships
Bronze medal – third place	2001 Paris	90 kg

Profile at external databases
- JudoInside.com: 6852

Dmitri Budõlin (born 1 March 1974) is an Estonian judoka.

== Achievements ==
Year	Tournament	Place	Weight class
2006	European Judo Championships	7th	Middleweight (90 kg)
2003	European Judo Championships	5th	Middleweight (90 kg)
2001	European Judo Championships	3rd	Middleweight (90 kg)
