= Karine Rambault =

French judoka (born 1971)

Personal information
- Nationality: French
- Born: 5 April 1971 (age 55) Angers, France

Sport
- Sport: Judo
Medal record
Representing France
Summer Universiade
| Silver medal – second place | 1995 Fukuoka | 66 kg |
| Silver medal – second place | 1995 Fukuoka | Team |

Karine Rambault (born 5 April 1971) is a French judoka. She competed in the women's middleweight event at the 2000 Summer Olympics.
