= Óscar Fernández (judoka) =

Spanish judoka

Medal record

Men's judo

Summer Universiade
Silver medal – second place	2003 Daegu	81 kg

European Championships
Bronze medal – third place	2001 Paris	81 kg

Óscar Fernández Vigil (born 15 May 1978) is a Spanish judoka.

== Achievements ==
Year	Tournament	Place	Weight class
2003	Universiade	2nd	Half middleweight (81 kg)
2001	European Judo Championships	3rd	Half middleweight (81 kg)
