= Ernst Hofer (judoka) =

Austrian judoka (1971–2023)

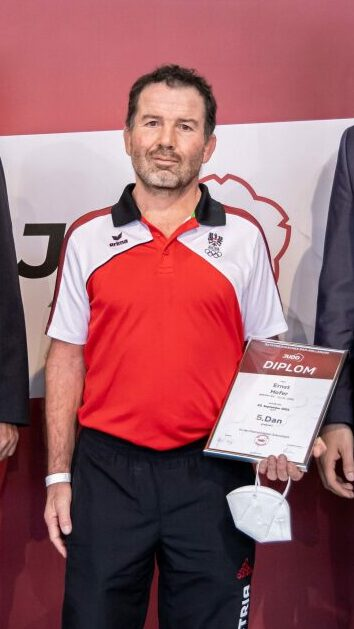

Personal information
- Full name: Ernst Hofer
- Nickname: Ernstl
- Nationality: Austrian
- Born: 1 August 1971 Upper Austria, Austria
- Died: 31 October 2023 (aged 52) Austria
- Occupation: Judoka
- Weight: −65 kg (−143 lb)

Sport
- Country: Austria
- Sport: Judo
- Weight class: -65 kg
- Rank: 5th dan black belt
- Club: UJZ Mühlviertel
Medal record
Men's judo
Representing Austria

Profile at external databases
- JudoInside.com: 501

Ernst Hofer (1 August 1971 – 31 October 2023) was an Austrian judoka.

== Achievements ==
Year	Tournament	Place	Weight class
1994	European Judo Championships	7th	Half lightweight (65 kg)

== Awards ==
- Goldenen Verdienstmedaille of the Austrian Judo Federation
