= Pedro Soares (judoka) =

Portuguese judoka

Personal information
- Born: 10 August 1974 (age 52) Lisbon, Portugal
Medal record
Men's Judo
Representing Portugal
European Championships
Silver medal – second place	1996 The Hague	95 kg
Silver medal – second place	2002 Maribor	100 kg
Bronze medal – third place	1995 Birmingham	95 kg
Bronze medal – third place	2002 Maribor	Open
Summer Universiade
Gold medal – first place	1999 Palma de Mallorca	100 kg

Pedro Nuno de Almeida Soares (born 10 August 1974 in Lisbon) is a Portuguese judoka.

== Achievements ==
Year	Tournament	Place	Weight class
2002	European Judo Championships	2nd	Heavyweight (+100 kg)
2002	European Judo Championships	3rd	Open class
2000	European Judo Championships	5th	Half heavyweight (100 kg)
1999	Universiade	1st	Half heavyweight (100 kg)
1997	European Judo Championships	5th	Half heavyweight (95 kg)
1996	European Judo Championships	2nd	Half heavyweight (95 kg)
1995	European Judo Championships	3rd	Half heavyweight (95 kg)
1994	European Judo Championships	7th	Half heavyweight (95 kg)
