= Akoto =

Akoto is an Ashanti surname. Notable people with the surname include:

- Osei Yaw Akoto (c. 1800–1834), Asantehene
- Owusu Afriyie Akoto (born 1949), Ghanaian agricultural economist and politician
- Ralf Akoto (born 1974), German judoka
