= Takeshi Kozai =

Japanese judoka (1974–2006)

Personal information
- Born: 23 April 1974 Fukuoka Prefecture, Japan
- Died: 8 November 2006 (aged 32)

Sport
- Sport: Judo
Medal record
Representing Japan
Men's Judo
Asian Championships
Silver medal – second place	1995 New Delhi	-95 kg
Summer Universiade
Bronze medal – third place	1995 Fukuoka	-95 kg

Takeshi Kozai (小齋 武志, Kozai Takeshi; 23 April 1974 – November 8, 2006) was a Japanese judoka.

He was born in Fukuoka Prefecture. He entered the Japan Highway Public Corporation after graduating from Fukuoka University, and won the Men's -95 kg category silver medal at the Asian Championships in 1995.

He became famous when he defeated Fedor Emelianenko at the Russian judo championships held in 1998.

On November 8, 2006, he died due to myocardial infarction.
