= Algimantas Merkevičius =

Lithuanian judoka (born 1969)

Medal record

Men's judo

Representing Lithuania

European Championships
Silver medal – second place	1999 Bratislava	90 kg
Bronze medal – third place	1997 Ostend	86 kg

Algimantas Merkevičius (born 3 January 1969) is a Lithuanian judoka. He competed for Lithuania at the 1996 Summer Olympics.

== Achievements ==
Year	Tournament	Place	Weight class
1999	European Judo Championships	2nd	Middleweight (90 kg)
1997	World Judo Championships	5th	Middleweight (86 kg)
1997	European Judo Championships	3rd	Middleweight (86 kg)
1996	European Judo Championships	7th	Middleweight (86 kg)
1995	World Judo Championships	7th	Middleweight (86 kg)
1995	European Judo Championships	7th	Middleweight (86 kg)
1993	European Judo Championships	5th	Middleweight (86 kg)
