= Artur Kejza =

Polish judoka

Artur Kejza (born 8 March 1974) is a Polish practitioner of judo.

== Achievements ==
Year	Tournament	Place	Weight class
1997	European Judo Championships	5th	Middleweight (86 kg)

== See also ==
- European Judo Championships
- History of martial arts
- Judo in Poland
- List of judo techniques
- List of judoka
- Martial arts timeline
