= Mansur Zhumayev =

Uzbekistani judoka

Personal information
- Nationality: Uzbekistani
- Born: 13 May 1975 (age 49)
- Occupation: Judoka

Sport
- Sport: Judo

Profile at external databases
- JudoInside.com: 8017

Mansur Zhumayev (born 13 May 1975) is an Uzbekistani judoka. He competed in the men's half-lightweight event at the 2000 Summer Olympics.
