= Igor Koliev =

Belarusian judoka (born 1967)

Personal information
- Born: 30 November 1967 (age 58)

Sport
- Sport: Judo
Medal record
Representing Belarus
Summer Universiade
Bronze medal – third place	1995 Fukuoka	65 kg

Igor Koliev (born 30 November 1967) is a Belarusian judoka.

== Achievements ==
Year	Tournament	Place	Weight class
1995	Universiade	3rd	Half lightweight (65 kg)
1994	European Judo Championships	5th	Half lightweight (65 kg)
