= Yacine Douma =

French judoka (born 1973)

Personal information
- Born: 5 April 1973 (age 53)
- Occupation: Judoka

Sport
- Sport: Judo
Medal record
Men's judo
European Championships
Gold medal – first place	2002 Maribor	60 kg
Silver medal – second place	1997 Ostend	60 kg
Summer Universiade
Gold medal – first place	1999 Palma de Mallorca	60 kg

Profile at external databases
- JudoInside.com: 354

Yacine Douma (born 5 April 1973 in Fréjus, Var) is a French judoka.

== Achievements ==
Year	Tournament	Place	Weight class
2002	European Judo Championships	1st	Extra lightweight (60 kg)
1999	Universiade	1st	Extra lightweight (60 kg)
1997	World Judo Championships	5th	Extra lightweight (60 kg)
1997	European Judo Championships	2nd	Extra lightweight (60 kg)
1995	European Judo Championships	5th	Extra lightweight (60 kg)
