= Rowena Sweatman =

British judoka (born 1968)

Personal information
- Nationality: British (English)
- Born: 10 February 1968 (age 58) Feltham, England
- Occupation: Judoka

Sport
- Sport: Judo
- Weight class: –66kg/–78kg
- Club: Pinewood JC, Wokingham
Medal record
Representing Great Britain
European Championships
Gold medal – first place	1994 Gdansk	-66kg
Bronze medal – third place	1995 Birmingham	-66kg

Profile at external databases
- JudoInside.com: 2345

Rowena Le May Sweatman (born 10 February 1968) is a British judoka. She competed at the 1996 Summer Olympics.

== Judo career ==
In 1986, she won the bronze medal in the 66 kg weight category at the judo demonstration sport event as part of the 1986 Commonwealth Games. Sweatman became champion of Great Britain, winning the middleweight division at the British Judo Championships in 1988.

In 1994, she became the European champion at the 1994 European Judo Championships in Gdańsk, where she won the gold medal in the -66 kg category. The following year she won a bronze medal at the 1995 European Judo Championships, in Birmingham.

In 1996, she was selected to represent Great Britain at the 1996 Summer Olympics in Atlanta. She competed in the women's middleweight event, reaching the quarter finals before losing to Aneta Szczepańska. The following year in 1997, she claimed a second British title, but this time at the heavier weight class of half-heavyweight (-78 kg).

== Family ==
Her brother is judo international Winston Sweatman.
