= Dmitri Morozov =

Russian judoka

Personal information
- Born: 24 February 1974 (age 52) Krasnodar Krai, Soviet Union

Sport
- Sport: Judo
Medal record
Representing Russia
World Championships
Bronze medal – third place	1999 Birmingham	Team
European Championships
Bronze medal – third place	1998 Oviedo	90 kg
Summer Universiade
Silver medal – second place	1995 Fukuoka	Team
Silver medal – second place	2001 Beijing	90 kg
Bronze medal – third place	1995 Fukuoka	86 kg

Dmitri Evgeniyevich Morozov (Russian: Дми́трий Евге́ньевич Моро́зов; born 24 February 1974) is a Russian judoka.

== Achievements ==
Year	Tournament	Place	Weight class
2001	Universiade	2nd	Middleweight (90 kg)
2000	European Judo Championships	7th	Middleweight (90 kg)
1998	European Judo Championships	3rd	Middleweight (90 kg)
1995	Universiade	3rd	Middleweight (86 kg)
