= Judo at the Goodwill Games =

Judo competition

Judo was one of the sports at the quadrennial Goodwill Games competition. Judo competitions were held at three of the five Goodwill Games, with it featuring for a final time at the Games in 1994.

== Editions ==
Games	Year	Host city	Host country
I	1986	Moscow	Soviet Union
II	1990	Seattle, Washington	United States
III	1994	Saint Petersburg	Russia
