= Laurent Crost =

French judoka (born 1970)

Personal information
- Born: 5 May 1970 (age 56)
- Occupation: Judoka

Sport
- Sport: Judo
Medal record
Men's judo
European Championships
| Gold medal – first place | 1994 Gdansk | Open |

Profile at external databases
- JudoInside.com: 2450

Laurent Crost (born 5 May 1970) is a French judoka. Crost was 1994 European Champion open category. The heavyweight won the Hungarian and Swiss Open title and won two French senior titles. He was World Team champion in 1994 with France and European team champion in 1996. Crost won World Military bronze in 1992.

== Achievements ==
| 1995 | European Judo Championships | 5th | Open class |
| 1994 | European Judo Championships | 1st | Open class |
