= Hrvoje Panžić =

Croatian judoka

Hrvoje Panžić (born 25 October 1978) is a Croatian judoka.

== Achievements ==
Year	Tournament	Place	Weight class
2001	European Judo Championships	7th	Middleweight (90 kg)

== See also ==
- European Judo Championships
- History of martial arts
- Judo in Croatia
- List of judo techniques
- List of judoka
- Martial arts timeline
