= Cyril Soyer =

French judoka

Personal information
- Born: 30 October 1978 (age 48)
- Occupation: Judoka

Sport
- Sport: Judo
Medal record
Men's judo
European Championships
Silver medal – second place	2001 Paris	60 kg

Profile at external databases
- JudoInside.com: 2603

Cyril Soyer (born 30 October 1978) is a French judoka.

== Achievements ==
Year	Tournament	Place	Weight class
2001	European Judo Championships	2nd	Extra lightweight (60 kg)
