= Mike Hax =

German judoka

Medal record

Men's judo

European Championships
Bronze medal – third place	1994 Gdansk	95 kg

Mike Hax (born 29 May 1970) is a German judoka.

== Achievements ==
Year	Tournament	Place	Weight class
1994	European Judo Championships	3rd	Half heavyweight (95 kg)
