= Alexander Davitashvili =

Georgian judoka (born 1974)

Medal record

Men's judo

European Championships
Bronze medal – third place	1994 Gdansk	Open
Bronze medal – third place	2000 Wroclaw	Open
Bronze medal – third place	2001 Paris	+100 kg

Alexander Davitashvili (Georgian: ალექსი დავითაშვილი; born 1 July 1974) is a Georgian judoka.

== Achievements ==
Year	Tournament	Place	Weight class
2004	European Open Championships	5th	Open class
2002	European Judo Championships	7th	Heavyweight (+100 kg)
2001	European Judo Championships	3rd	Heavyweight (+100 kg)
2000	European Judo Championships	3rd	Open class
1999	World Judo Championships	5th	Open class
1997	European Judo Championships	7th	Open class
1996	European Judo Championships	5th	Open class
1995	European Judo Championships	7th	Heavyweight (+95 kg)
1994	European Judo Championships	3rd	Open class
