= Nicolai Belokosov =

Moldovan judoka (born 1975)

Personal information
- Born: 24 January 1975 (age 51)
- Occupation: Judoka

Sport
- Sport: Judo
Medal record
Men's judo
European Championships
Bronze medal – third place	2001 Paris	73 kg

Profile at external databases
- IJF: 59064
- JudoInside.com: 8176

Nicolai Belokosov (born 24 January 1975) is a Moldovan judoka.

== Achievements ==
Year	Tournament	Place	Weight class
2001	European Judo Championships	3rd	Lightweight (73 kg)
