= Julian Davies (judoka) =

British judoka

Personal information
- Nationality: British
- Born: 16 March 1971 (age 55) Salisbury, England

Sport
- Sport: Judo
Medal record
Men's judo
European Championships
Silver medal – second place	1996 The Hague	65 kg
Bronze medal – third place	1997 Ostend	65 kg

Julian Davies (born 16 March 1971) is a British judoka. He competed in the men's half-lightweight event at the 1996 Summer Olympics.

== Achievements ==
Year	Tournament	Place	Weight class
1997	European Judo Championships	3rd	Half lightweight (65 kg)
1996	European Judo Championships	2nd	Half lightweight (65 kg)
1994	European Judo Championships	7th	Half lightweight (65 kg)
