= Patric Nebhuth =

German judoka (born 1973)

Personal information
- Born: 19 March 1973 (age 52)
- Occupation: Judoka

Sport
- Sport: Judo

Profile at external databases
- JudoInside.com: 269

Patric Nebhuth (born 19 March 1973) is a German judoka.

== Achievements ==
Year	Tournament	Place	Weight class
1997	European Judo Championships	7th	Half heavyweight (95 kg)
