= Jorge Quintanal =

Guatemalan judoka (born 1974)

Personal information
- Nationality: Guatemalan
- Born: 27 August 1974 (age 51)

Sport
- Sport: Judo

Jorge Quintanal (born 27 August 1974) is a Guatemalan judoka. He competed in the men's half-lightweight event at the 2000 Summer Olympics.
