= Illya Chymchyuri =

Ukrainian judoka (born 1973)

Personal information
- Born: 19 April 1973 (age 53)
- Occupation: Judoka

Sport
- Sport: Judo
Medal record
Men's judo
Representing Ukraine
European Championships
| Bronze medal – third place | 1996 The Hague | 71 kg |
| Bronze medal – third place | 1998 Oviedo | 73 kg |

Profile at external databases
- JudoInside.com: 475

Illya Chymchyuri (born 19 April 1973) is a Ukrainian judoka.

== Achievements ==
| Year | Tournament | Place | Weight class |
|---|---|---|---|
| 2005 | European Judo Championships | 7th | Half middleweight (81 kg) |
| 2001 | World Judo Championships | 7th | Lightweight (73 kg) |
| 1998 | European Judo Championships | 3rd | Lightweight (73 kg) |
| 1997 | World Judo Championships | 7th | Lightweight (71 kg) |
| 1996 | European Judo Championships | 3rd | Lightweight (71 kg) |
