= Roy Poels =

Dutch judoka (born 1972)

Roy Poels (born 16 May 1972 in Venray) is a Dutch judoka.

== Achievements ==
Year	Tournament	Place	Weight class
1994	European Judo Championships	7th	Middleweight (86 kg)

== See also ==
- List of judo organizations#Netherlands
- Sport in the Netherlands#Judo
