= Risa Kazumi =

Japanese judoka (born 1978)

Personal information
- Nationality: Japanese
- Born: 24 April 1978 (age 48) Hitachinaka, Japan

Sport
- Sport: Judo
Medal record
Representing Japan
Summer Universiade
Bronze medal – third place	1999 Palma de Mallorca	63kg
East Asian Games
Bronze medal – third place	1997 Busan	63kg

Risa Kazumi (born 24 April 1978) is a Japanese judoka. She competed in the women's middleweight event at the 1996 Summer Olympics.
