= Miguel Angel Moreno =

Salvadoran judoka

Personal information
- Nationality: Salvadoran
- Born: 2 March 1977 (age 48)

Sport
- Sport: Judo

Miguel Angel Moreno (born 2 March 1977) is a Salvadoran judoka. He competed in the men's half-lightweight event at the 2000 Summer Olympics, where he was eliminated in the Round of 32 by David Somerville.
