= Tamás Kovács (judoka) =

Hungarian judoka

Tamás Kovács (born 5 November 1978) is a Hungarian judoka.

== Achievements ==
Year	Tournament	Place	Weight class
1997	European Judo Championships	7th	Extra lightweight (60 kg)

== See also ==
- European Judo Championships
- History of martial arts
- Judo in Hungary
- List of judo techniques
- List of judoka
- Martial arts timeline
