= Sergei Klischin =

Austrian Olympic judoka

Personal information
- Born: 24 May 1967 (age 59)
- Occupation: Judoka

Sport
- Sport: Judo
Medal record
Men's judo
Representing Austria
European Championships
Silver medal – second place	1997 Ostend	86 kg
Bronze medal – third place	1996 The Hague	86 kg

Profile at external databases
- JudoInside.com: 3207

Sergei Klischin (born 24 May 1967) is an Austrian judoka. He competed in the men's middleweight event at the 1996 Summer Olympics.

== Achievements ==
Year	Tournament	Place	Weight class
1997	European Judo Championships	2nd	Middleweight (86 kg)
1996	European Judo Championships	3rd	Middleweight (86 kg)
