= Ulduz Sultanov =

Azerbaijani judoka (born 1974)

Ulduz Sultanov (born 7 April 1974) is an Azerbaijani judoka who has competed in the extra lightweight category (-60 kg).

== Achievements ==
Year	Tournament	Place	Weight class
1999	European Judo Championships	5th	Extra lightweight (60 kg)
1998	European Judo Championships	7th	Extra lightweight (60 kg)
1996	European Judo Championships	7th	Extra lightweight (60 kg)
