= Koen Sleeckx =

Belgian judoka

Koen Sleeckx (born 20 March 1975) is a Belgian judoka.

== Achievements ==
Year	Tournament	Place	Weight class
2001	European Judo Championships	7th	Lightweight (73 kg)

== See also ==
- European Judo Championships
- History of martial arts
- Judo in Belgium
- List of judo techniques
- List of judoka
- Martial arts timeline
