= Rashad Mammadov =

Belarusian judoka (born 1974)

Medal record

Men's judo

Representing Belarus

European Championships
Gold medal – first place	1997 Ostend	60 kg
Bronze medal – third place	1998 Oviedo	66 kg

Rashad Mammadov (Azerbaijani: Rəşad Məmmədov, born 23 July 1974) is an ethnic Azerbaijani judoka from Belarus.

== Achievements ==
Year	Tournament	Place	Weight class
2000	European Judo Championships	7th	Half lightweight (66 kg)
1998	European Judo Championships	3rd	Half lightweight (66 kg)
1997	European Judo Championships	1st	Extra lightweight (60 kg)
1994	European Judo Championships	5th	Extra lightweight (60 kg)
