= Evgeni Karpoukhine =

Russian judoka (born 1973)

Evgeni Dmitrievich Karpoukhine (Russian: Евгений Дмитриевич Карпухин, romanized: Yevgeniy Dmitriyevich Karpukhin; born 26 September 1973) is a Russian judoka.

== Achievements ==
Year	Tournament	Place	Weight class
2001	European Judo Championships	5th	Lightweight (73 kg)

== See also ==
- Sport in Russia
