= Alice Dubois =

French judoka

Personal information
- Nationality: French
- Born: 20 April 1970 (age 56) Levallois-Perret, France

Sport
- Sport: Judo

Alice Dubois (born 20 April 1970) is a French judoka. She competed in the women's middleweight event at the 1996 Summer Olympics.
