= Vincenzo Carabetta =

French judoka (born 1973)

Medal record

Men's Judo

European Championships
Silver medal – second place	1994 Gdansk	86 kg
Bronze medal – third place	1998 Oviedo	90 kg

Vincenzo Carabetta (born 7 September 1973) is a French judoka. His brother Bruno Carabetta is also a French international judoka.

== Achievements ==
Year	Tournament	Place	Weight class
2001	Mediterranean Games	1st	Middleweight (90 kg)
1999	European Judo Championships	5th	Middleweight (90 kg)
1998	European Judo Championships	3rd	Middleweight (90 kg)
1995	European Judo Championships	5th	Middleweight (86 kg)
1994	European Judo Championships	2nd	Middleweight (86 kg)
