= Ivan Baglayev =

Kazakhstani judoka (born 1975)

Personal information
- Nationality: Kazakhstani
- Born: 15 November 1975 (age 50)

Sport
- Sport: Judo
Medal record
Men's judo
Representing Kazakhstan
East Asian Games
Silver medal – second place	2001 Osaka	66 kg
Asian Games
Silver medal – second place	1998 Bangkok	66 kg

Ivan Baglayev (Иван Васильевич Баглаев, born 15 November 1975) is a Kazakhstani judoka. He competed in the men's half-lightweight event at the 2000 Summer Olympics.
