= Claudia Zwiers =

Dutch judoka (born 1973)

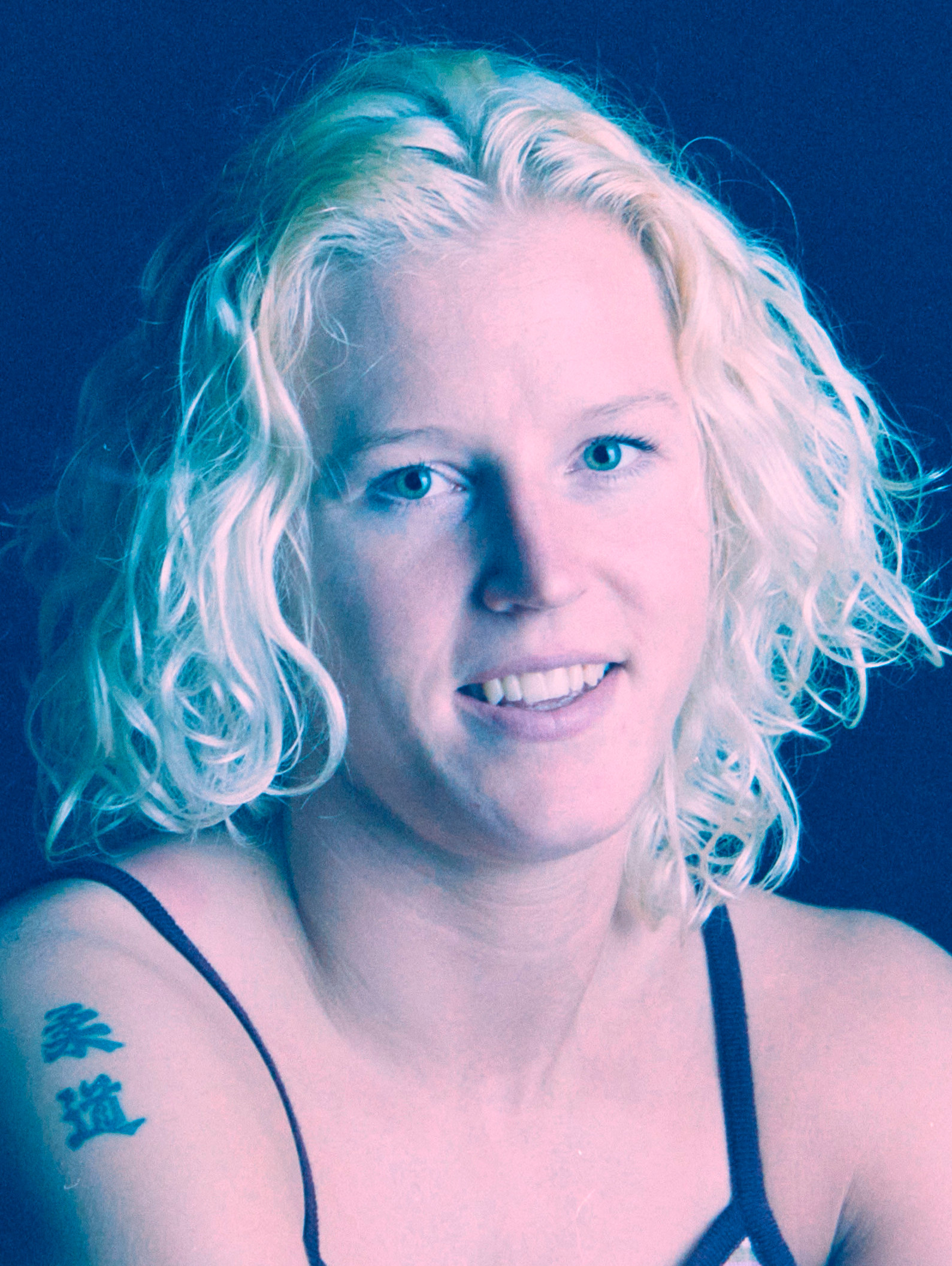
- Zwiers in 2001

Personal information
- Born: 23 November 1973 (age 52)
- Occupation: Judoka

Sport
- Country: Netherlands
- Sport: Judo
- Weight class: –66 kg, –70 kg, –78 kg

Achievements and titles
- Olympic Games: (bronze) (1996)
- World Champ.: (bronze) (2005)
- European Champ.: (gold) (1996)
Medal record
Women's judo
Representing the Netherlands
Olympic Games
| Bronze medal – third place | 1996 Atlanta | ‍–‍66 kg |
World Championships
| Bronze medal – third place | 2005 Cairo | ‍–‍78 kg |
European Championships
| Gold medal – first place | 1996 The Hague | ‍–‍66 kg |
| Bronze medal – third place | 1993 Athens | ‍–‍66 kg |
| Bronze medal – third place | 1994 Gdansk | ‍–‍66 kg |
| Bronze medal – third place | 1997 Oostende | ‍–‍66 kg |
| Bronze medal – third place | 2001 Paris | ‍–‍78 kg |
| Bronze medal – third place | 2002 Maribor | ‍–‍78 kg |
Summer Universiade
| Silver medal – second place | 2001 Beijing | ‍–‍78 kg |

Profile at external databases
- IJF: 6092
- JudoInside.com: 142
- Updated on 4 June 2023

Claudia Antoinette Zwiers (born 23 November 1973 in Haarlem, North Holland) is a judoka from the Netherlands, who represented her native country at two Summer Olympics (1996 and 2004). She won the bronze medal in the women's middleweight division (‍–‍66 kg) in Atlanta, United States (1996).
