= Vladimir Dratchko =

Russian judoka

Personal information
- Born: 20 January 1970 (age 56) Tuapse, Krasnodar Krai, Russian SFSR, Soviet Union
Medal record
Representing Russia
Men's judo
Goodwill Games
Gold medal – first place	1994 Saint Petersburg	65 kg
European Championships
Gold medal – first place	1994 Gdansk	65 kg

Vladimir Yakovlevich Dratchko (Russian: Владимир Яковлевич Драчко; born 20 January 1970) is a Russian judoka.

== Achievements ==
Year	Tournament	Place	Weight class
1995	European Judo Championships	5th	Half lightweight (65 kg)
1994	European Judo Championships	1st	Half lightweight (65 kg)
1994	Goodwill Games	1st	Half lightweight (65 kg)
