= Ramaz Chochosvili =

Georgian judoka

Personal information
- Born: 14 November 1975 (age 51)
- Occupation: Judoka

Sport
- Sport: Judo
Medal record
Men's judo
European Championships
Bronze medal – third place	1996 The Hague	Open
Bronze medal – third place	2001 Paris	Open
Bronze medal – third place	2003 Düsseldorf	Open
Summer Universiade
Silver medal – second place	1999 Palma de Mallorca	Open

Profile at external databases
- JudoInside.com: 476

Ramaz Chochisvili (Georgian: რამაზ შოთას ძე ჩოჩიშვილი, Ukrainian: Рамаз Шотайович Чочишвілі; born 14 November 1975) is a Georgian judoka. He formerly competed for Ukraine.

== Achievements ==
Year	Tournament	Place	Weight class
2003	European Judo Championships	3rd	Open class
2001	World Judo Championships	5th	Open class
2001	European Judo Championships	3rd	Open class
1999	World Judo Championships	5th	Open class
1999	Universiade	2nd	Open class
1998	European Judo Championships	7th	Open class
1996	European Judo Championships	3rd	Open class
