= Ko Kyung-doo =

South Korean judoka (born 1971)

Personal information
- Born: 26 October 1971 (age 54) Pohang, South Korea

Sport
- Sport: Judo
Medal record
Representing South Korea
Summer Universiade
Bronze medal – third place	1995 Fukuoka	Open

Ko Kyung-Doo (born 26 October 1971) is a Korean former judoka who competed in the 2000 Summer Olympics.
