= Marie Elisabeth Veys =

Belgian judoka (born 1981)

Personal information
- Born: 1 May 1981 (age 45)
- Occupation: Judoka

Sport
- Country: Belgium
- Sport: Judo
- Weight class: +78 kg

Achievements and titles
- World Champ.: 5th (2001)
- European Champ.: (bronze) (2001, 2003)
Medal record
Women's judo
Representing Belgium
European Championships
Bronze medal – third place	2001 Paris	+78 kg
Bronze medal – third place	2003 Düsseldorf	+78 kg
World Juniors Championships
Silver medal – second place	2000 Nabeul	+78 kg
European Junior Championships
Gold medal – first place	2000 Nicosia	+78 kg

Profile at external databases
- IJF: 57245
- JudoInside.com: 196
- Updated on 23 February 2022

Marie Elisabeth Veys (born 1 May 1981) is a Belgian judoka.

== Achievements ==
Year	Tournament	Place	Weight class
2003	European Championships	3rd	Heavyweight (+78 kg)
2002	European Championships	5th	Open class
2001	European Championships	3rd	Heavyweight (+78 kg)
2001	World Championships	5th	Heavyweight (+78 kg)
