= Dario Romano =

Italian judoka

Dario Romano (born 15 November 1971) is an Italian judoka form Cercola, in province of Naples.

== Achievements ==
Year	Tournament	Place	Weight class
1997	Mediterranean Games	1st	Half middleweight (78 kg)
1994	European Judo Championships	7th	Half middleweight (78 kg)
