= Danny Kingston =

British judoka (born 1973)

Personal information
- Nationality: British
- Born: 12 February 1973 (age 53)
- Occupation: Judoka

Sport
- Sport: Judo
- Weight class: lightweight
Medal record
Men's judo
European Championships
Gold medal – first place	1996 The Hague	71 kg
Bronze medal – third place	1997 Ostend	71 kg

Profile at external databases
- JudoInside.com: 2304

Danny Kingston (born 12 February 1973) is a British judoka.

== Judo career ==
Kingston became champion of Great Britain, winning the lightweight division at the British Judo Championships in 1993. Three years later he won the gold medal at the 1996 European Judo Championships.

=== Other achievements ===
Year	Tournament	Place	Weight class
1995	World Judo Championships	5th	Lightweight (71 kg)
1995	European Judo Championships	7th	Lightweight (71 kg)
1993	World Judo Championships	7th	Lightweight (71 kg)
1996	European Judo Championships	1st	Lightweight (71 kg)
1997	European Judo Championships	3rd	Lightweight (71 kg)
