= Ángel Sánchez (judoka) =

Cuban Olympic judoka (born 1974)

Personal information
- Born: 24 November 1974 (age 51) Pinar del Río, Cuba

Sport
- Sport: Judo
Medal record
Representing Cuba
Summer Universiade
Silver medal – second place	1995 Fukuoka	Half-heavyweight
Bronze medal – third place	1999 Palma de Mallorca	Heavyweight
Bronze medal – third place	1999 Palma de Mallorca	Open class
Pan American Games
Gold medal – first place	1999 Winnipeg	Heavyweight
Central American and Caribbean Games
Gold medal – first place	1993 Ponce	Half-heavyweight
Gold medal – first place	1998 Maracaibo	Heavyweight

Ángel Vladimir Sánchez Armentero (born 24 November 1974) is a Cuban former judoka who competed in the 1996 Summer Olympics and in the 2000 Summer Olympics.
