= Judo at the 1999 Summer Universiade =

Judo competition

Judo Judo at the 1999 Summer Universiade
- Location: Palma de Mallorca, Spain
- Dates: 8–12 July 1999

Medalists
gold medal	Japan (3rd title)
silver medal	Cuba
bronze medal	Netherlands

Champions
- Men's team: South Korea (2nd title)
- Women's team: France (1st title)

Competition at external databases
- Links: JudoInside

The Judo competition in the 1999 Summer Universiade were held in Palma de Mallorca, Spain from 8 to 12 July 1999.

== Medal overview ==
=== Men's event ===
Event	Gold	Silver	Bronze
Extra-lightweight (60 kg)	Yacine Douma (FRA)	Choi Min-Chul (KOR)	Nestor Khergiani (GEO)
Extra-lightweight (60 kg)	Yacine Douma (FRA)	Choi Min-Chul (KOR)	Manolo Poolot (CUB)
Half-lightweight (66 kg)	Michihiro Omigawa (JPN)	Musa Nastuyev (RUS)	Victor Bivol (MDA)
Half-lightweight (66 kg)	Michihiro Omigawa (JPN)	Musa Nastuyev (RUS)	Jozef Krnáč (SVK)
Lightweight (73 kg)	Khaliuny Boldbaatar (MGL)	Eric Bonti (GBR)	Michel Almeida (POR)
Lightweight (73 kg)	Khaliuny Boldbaatar (MGL)	Eric Bonti (GBR)	Choi Young-Sin (KOR)
Half-middleweight (81 kg)	Edwin Steringa (NED)	Konstantin Savtchichkine (RUS)	Kazunorii Kubota (JPN)
Half-middleweight (81 kg)	Edwin Steringa (NED)	Konstantin Savtchichkine (RUS)	Ruslan Revenko (UKR)
Middleweight (90 kg)	Keith Morgan (CAN)	Armen Bagdasarov (UZB)	Yosvany Despaigne (CUB)
Middleweight (90 kg)	Keith Morgan (CAN)	Armen Bagdasarov (UZB)	Yoo Sung-Yeon (KOR)
Half-heavyweight (100 kg)	Pedro Soares (POR)	Igor Gorbokon (UKR)	Iveri Jikurauli (GEO)
Half-heavyweight (100 kg)	Pedro Soares (POR)	Igor Gorbokon (UKR)	Youri Stepkine (RUS)
Heavyweight (+100 kg)	Yasuyuki Muneta (JPN)	Dennis van der Geest (NED)	Kang Byung-Jin (KOR)
Heavyweight (+100 kg)	Yasuyuki Muneta (JPN)	Dennis van der Geest (NED)	Vladimir Armentero (CUB)
Openweight	Alexandru Lungu (ROM)	Ramaz Chochosvili (GEO)	Takumi Saruwatari (JPN)
Openweight	Alexandru Lungu (ROM)	Ramaz Chochosvili (GEO)	Vladimir Armentero (CUB)
Team	South Korea	Spain	Japan
Team	South Korea	Spain	Ukraine

=== Women's event ===
Event	Gold	Silver	Bronze
Extra-lightweight (48 kg)	Atsuko Nagai (JPN)	Park Sung-Ja (KOR)	Ilse Heylen (BEL)
Extra-lightweight (48 kg)	Atsuko Nagai (JPN)	Park Sung-Ja (KOR)	Frédérique Jossinet (FRA)
Half-lightweight (52 kg)	Legna Verdecia (CUB)	Carolina Mariani (ARG)	Antonia Cuomo (ITA)
Half-lightweight (52 kg)	Legna Verdecia (CUB)	Carolina Mariani (ARG)	Georgina Singleton (GBR)
Lightweight (57 kg)	Driulis González (CUB)	Michaela Vernerová (CZE)	Khishigbatyn Erdenet-Od (MGL)
Lightweight (57 kg)	Driulis González (CUB)	Michaela Vernerová (CZE)	Zheng Linli (CHN)
Half-middleweight (63 kg)	Daniëlle Vriezema (NED)	Karen Roberts (GBR)	Eszter Csizmadia (HUN)
Half-middleweight (63 kg)	Daniëlle Vriezema (NED)	Karen Roberts (GBR)	Risa Kazumi (JPN)
Middleweight (70 kg)	Sivelis Verones (CUB)	Miki Amao (JPN)	Kate Howey (GBR)
Middleweight (70 kg)	Sivelis Verones (CUB)	Miki Amao (JPN)	Leire Iglesias (ESP)
Half-heavyweight (78 kg)	Celine Lebrum (FRA)	Simona Richter (ROM)	Mizuho Matsuzaki (JPN)
Half-heavyweight (78 kg)	Celine Lebrum (FRA)	Simona Richter (ROM)	Esther San Miguel (ESP)
Heavyweight (+78 kg)	Yuan Hua (CHN)	Tea Donguzashvili (RUS)	Daima Beltrán (CUB)
Heavyweight (+78 kg)	Yuan Hua (CHN)	Tea Donguzashvili (RUS)	Midori Shintani (JPN)
Openweight	Yuan Hua (CHN)	Mayumi Yamashita (JPN)	Daima Beltrán (CUB)
Openweight	Yuan Hua (CHN)	Mayumi Yamashita (JPN)	Lucia Morico (ITA)
Team	France	Cuba	Italy
Team	France	Cuba	South Korea

=== Medals table ===
Rank	Nation	Gold	Silver	Bronze	Total
1	Japan (JPN)	3	2	5	10
2	Cuba (CUB)	3	0	6	9
3	Netherlands (NED)	2	1	0	3
4	China (CHN)	2	0	1	3
4	France (FRA)	2	0	1	3
6	Romania (ROM)	1	1	0	2
7	Mongolia (MGL)	1	0	1	2
7	Portugal (POR)	1	0	1	2
9	Canada (CAN)	1	0	0	1
10	Russia (RUS)	0	3	1	4
11	South Korea (KOR)	0	2	3	5
12	Great Britain (GBR)	0	2	2	4
13	Georgia (GEO)	0	1	2	3
14	Ukraine (UKR)	0	1	1	2
15	Argentina (ARG)	0	1	0	1
15	Czech Republic (CZE)	0	1	0	1
15	Uzbekistan (UZB)	0	1	0	1
18	Italy (ITA)	0	0	2	2
18	Spain (ESP)	0	0	2	2
20	Belgium (BEL)	0	0	1	1
20	Hungary (HUN)	0	0	1	1
20	Moldova (MDA)	0	0	1	1
20	Slovakia (SVK)	0	0	1	1
Totals (23 entries)		16	16	32	64
