= Konstantin Savchishkin =

Russian judoka

Personal information
- Born: 15 November 1973 (age 53)
- Occupation: Judoka

Sport
- Sport: Judo
Medal record
Men's judo
Representing Russia
European Championships
Bronze medal – third place	1996 The Hague	78 kg
Summer Universiade
Silver medal – second place	1999 Palma de Mallorca	81 kg

Profile at external databases
- JudoInside.com: 601

Konstantin Savtchichkine (born 15 November 1973) is a Russian judoka.

== Achievements ==
Year	Tournament	Place	Weight class
1999	Universiade	2nd	Half middleweight (81 kg)
1996	European Judo Championships	3rd	Half middleweight (78 kg)
