= Zoltán Csizmadia =

Hungarian judoka (born 1977)

Medal record

Men's judo

European Championships
Bronze medal – third place	2001 Paris	Open

Zoltán Csizmadia (born 12 December 1977) is a Hungarian judoka.

== Achievements ==
Year	Tournament	Weight class	Place
2000	European Judo Championships	Open class	7th
2001	European Judo Championships	Open class	3rd
2003	European Judo Championships	Heavyweight (>100 kg)	7th
