= Mariela Spacek =

Austrian judoka

Personal information
- Nationality: Austrian
- Born: 3 November 1974 (age 50); Dubrovnik, Yugoslavia
- Occupation: Judoka

Sport
- Sport: Judo

Profile at external databases
- IJF: 53345
- JudoInside.com: 3222

Mariela Spacek (born 3 November 1974) is an Austrian judoka. She competed in the women's middleweight event at the 1996 Summer Olympics.
