= Dirk Radszat =

German judoka

Personal information
- Born: 4 June 1971 (age 55)
- Occupation: Judoka

Sport
- Sport: Judo
Medal record
Men's judo
European Championships
Bronze medal – third place	1997 Ostend	86 kg
Bronze medal – third place	1998 Oviedo	81 kg

Profile at external databases
- JudoInside.com: 273

Dirk Radszat (born 4 June 1971) is a German judoka.

== Achievements ==
Year	Tournament	Place	Weight class
2000	European Judo Championships	7th	Half middleweight (81 kg)
1998	European Judo Championships	3rd	Half middleweight (81 kg)
1997	European Judo Championships	3rd	Half middleweight (78 kg)
