= Matti Lattu =

Finnish judoka

Matti Lattu (born 21 June 1971) is a Finnish judoka. He placed 7th at the 1997 European Judo Championships with three wins and two losses. As of 2018, he holds a 5th degree black belt.

== Achievements ==
| Year | Tournament | Place | Weight class |
|---|---|---|---|
| 1997 | European Judo Championships | 7th | Half middleweight (78 kg) |

Lattu was the CEO of a software business: http://www.heeros.com until 2019.
