= Pedro Caravana =

Portuguese judoka

Personal information
- Born: 4 November 1974 (age 51)
- Occupation: Judoka

Sport
- Sport: Judo
Medal record
Men's Judo
Representing Portugal
European Championships
| Bronze medal – third place | 1997 Ostend | 60 kg |

Profile at external databases
- JudoInside.com: 3235

Pedro Filipe Neto da Silva Caravana (born 4 November 1974) is a Portuguese judoka.

== Achievements ==
| Year | Tournament | Place | Weight class |
|---|---|---|---|
| 1999 | European Judo Championships | 5th | Extra lightweight (60 kg) |
| 1997 | European Judo Championships | 3rd | Extra lightweight (60 kg) |
