= Vardan Moivsisian =

Armenian judoka (born 1976)

Personal information
- Born: 17 May 1976 (age 50)

Sport
- Sport: Judo

Vardan Moivsisian (born 17 May 1976) is an Armenian judoka.

== Achievements ==
Year	Tournament	Place	Weight class
1996	European Judo Championships	7th	Lightweight (71 kg)

== See also ==
- European Judo Championships
- History of martial arts
- List of judo techniques
- List of judoka
- Timeline of martial arts
