= Hüseyin Özkan =

Turkish judoka (born 1972)

Personal information
- Nationality: Turkish
- Born: Khasan Delimbekovich Bisultanov; 20 January 1972 (age 54) Argun, Checheno-Ingush Autonomous Soviet Socialist Republic, RSFSR, USSR
- Occupation: Judoka

Sport
- Country: Turkey
- Sport: Judo
- Weight class: –60 kg, –66 kg
- Club: İstanbul Büyükşehir Belediyesi S.K.

Achievements and titles
- Olympic Games: (gold) (2000)
- World Champ.: (silver) (1999)
- European Champ.: (gold) (1997)
Medal record
Men's judo
Representing Turkey
Olympic Games
Gold medal – first place	2000 Sydney	‍–‍66 kg
World Championships
Silver medal – second place	1999 Birmingham	‍–‍66 kg
European Championships
Gold medal – first place	1997 Oostende	‍–‍65 kg
Bronze medal – third place	1999 Bratislava	‍–‍66 kg
Bronze medal – third place	2003 Düsseldorf	‍–‍66 kg
Mediterranean Games
Gold medal – first place	1997 Bari	‍–‍65 kg
Representing Russia
European Championships
Silver medal – second place	1993 Athens	‍–‍60 kg
Representing Soviet Union
European Junior Championships
Gold medal – first place	1991 Pieksämäki	‍–‍60 kg

Profile at external databases
- IJF: 2170
- JudoInside.com: 653
- Updated on 31 May 2023

Hüseyin Özkan, née Khasan Delimbekovich Bisultanov(Хасан Делимбекович Бисултанов (Russian), born 20 January 1972), is a Turkish judoka. At the 2000 Summer Olympics held in Sydney, Australia, he won the gold medal in the men's Half Lightweight (‍–‍66 kg) category. He became the first judoka to win an Olympics gold medal for Turkey. He is a member of the İstanbul Büyükşehir Belediyesi S.K.

== Career ==
Hüseyin Özkan was born in 1972 in Argun, Chechnya, then part of the Soviet Union. He began practicing judo actively during his school years and quickly achieved the level of master of sports. After finishing school, he was conscripted into the army but continued training and competing in major international tournaments. He won the Soviet Junior Championships twice, in 1990 and 1991, and became European Junior Champion in 1991.

In 1993, he won a silver medal at the European Judo Championships representing Russia. However, due to the outbreak of the First Chechen War in 1994, he was forced to leave his homeland. Losing opportunities for proper training, he moved to Turkey, acquired Turkish citizenship, and changed his name to Hüseyin Özkan.

Özkan made his debut for the Turkish national team at the 1993 European Team Championships in Frankfurt, where Turkey finished third. He won the Sofia World Cup twice, in 1994 and 1996. In 1997, he claimed the European Championship title in Oostende, earning Turkey its first individual gold medal in judo. He continued his success by winning bronze at the 1999 European Championships in Bratislava and silver at the 1999 World Championships in Birmingham, narrowly losing to Larbi Benboudaoud.

At the 2000 Sydney Olympics, Özkan won the gold medal in the men’s 66 kg category by defeating Benboudaoud by ippon in the final, becoming Turkey’s first Olympic judo champion.

After Sydney, he suffered several serious injuries but managed to regain the Turkish championship title and won a bronze medal at the 2003 European Championships in Düsseldorf. However, injuries prevented him from competing at the 2004 Athens Olympics.

Currently, Özkan works as a coach at Kocaeli Büyükşehir Belediye Kağıtspor and serves as a trainer for the Turkish youth and senior national judo teams. The Kocaeli Metropolitan Municipality organizes an annual international judo tournament in his honor, with the third edition held in 2023.

== Achievements ==
- 1993 European Judo Championships - Silver
- 1997 European Judo Championships - Gold
- 1997 Mediterranean Games - Gold
- 1999 European Judo Championships - Bronze
- 1999 World Judo Championships - Silver
- 2000 Summer Olympics - Gold
- 2002 European Judo Championships - 7th
- 2003 European Judo Championships - Bronze
- 2003 World Judo Championships - 7th
- 2005 European Judo Championships - 7th
