= Alex Ottiano =

American judoka (born 1976)

Personal information
- Full name: Alexander R. Ottiano
- Born: February 4, 1976 (age 50) Providence, Rhode Island, U.S.
- Occupation: Judoka
- Height: 5 ft 6.5 in (169 cm)
- Weight: 143 lb (65 kg)

Sport
- Sport: Judo
Medal record
Men's Judo
Representing the United States
Pan American Games
Bronze medal – third place	1999 Winnipeg	Half Lightweight
Bronze medal – third place	2003 Santo Domingo	Half Lightweight

Profile at external databases
- IJF: 52803
- JudoInside.com: 3587

Alexander R. "Alex" Ottiano (born February 4, 1976) is a male judoka from the United States, who twice won the bronze medal in the men's half lightweight division (– 66 kg) at the Pan American Games (1999 and 2003). He represented his native country in two consecutive Summer Olympics, starting in 2000.
