= Zsolt Kunyik =

Hungarian judoka (born 1974)

Personal information
- Born: 23 April 1974 (age 52) Tatabánya, Hungary

Sport
- Sport: Judo

Zsolt Kunyik (born 23 April 1974) is a Hungarian former judoka who competed in the 1996 Summer Olympics.
