= Aneta Szczepańska =

Polish judoka

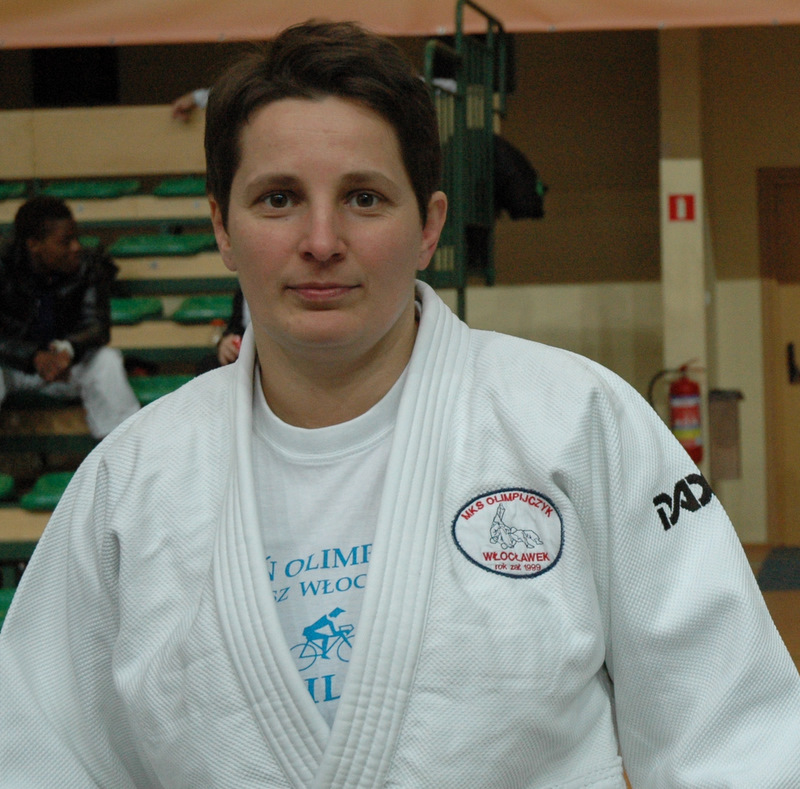

Personal information
- Full name: Aneta Maria Szczepańska
- Born: 20 June 1974 (age 52) Włocławek, Poland
- Occupation: Judoka

Sport
- Country: Poland
- Sport: Judo
- Weight class: –63 kg, –66 kg

Achievements and titles
- Olympic Games: (silver) (1996)
- World Champ.: (bronze) (1995)
- European Champ.: (silver) (2004)
Medal record
Women's judo
Representing Poland
Olympic Games
Silver medal – second place	1996 Atlanta	‍–‍66 kg
World Championships
Bronze medal – third place	1995 Chiba	‍–‍66 kg
European Championships
Silver medal – second place	2004 Bucharest	‍–‍63 kg

Profile at external databases
- IJF: 16088
- JudoInside.com: 1170
- Updated on 4 June 2023

Aneta Maria Szczepańska (born 20 June 1974) is a Polish judoka.

She won the silver medal in the middleweight (‍–‍66 kg) division at the 1996 Summer Olympics.

== Awards ==
For her sport achievements, she received:

- Golden Cross of Merit in 1996.
