= Federico Cainero =

Italian judoka

Federico Cainero (born 28 July 1969) is an Italian judoka.

== Achievements ==
Year	Tournament	Place	Weight class
1997	European Judo Championships	7th	Lightweight (71 kg)

== See also ==
- European Judo Championships
- History of martial arts
- Judo in Italy
- List of judo techniques
- List of judoka
- Martial arts timeline
