= Georgi Tonkov =

Bulgarian martial artist

- Born: Bulgaria
- Died: 10.06.2008; Pazardjik
- Native name: Георги Тонков
- Nationality: (Bulgaria) Bulgarian
- Height: 6 ft 2 in (1.88 m)
- Weight: 288 lb (131 kg; 20.6 st)
- Division: Heavyweight
- Style: Judo/Sambo
- Fighting out of: Rings Bulgaria

Mixed martial arts record
- Total: 2
- Wins: 1
- By knockout: 0
- By submission: 1
- Losses: 1
- By knockout: 1
- Draws: 0

Other information
- Judo career
- Weight class: +100 kg, Open

Judo achievements and titles
- World Champ.: 5th (2001)
- European Champ.: 5th (2001)
Medal record
Men's judo
Representing Bulgaria
European Junior Championships
Bronze medal – third place	1994 Lisbon	‍–‍95 kg
Bronze medal – third place	1995 Valladolid	‍–‍95 kg

Profile at external judo databases
- IJF: 57124
- JudoInside.com: 8495

Georgi Tonkov (Bulgarian: Георги Тонков; born 5 April 1975 – 10 June 2008) is a Bulgarian judoka.

== Achievements ==
Year	Tournament	Place	Weight class
2002	European Judo Championships	7th	Heavyweight (+100 kg)
2001	World Judo Championships	5th	Heavyweight (+100 kg)
2001	European Judo Championships	5th	Open class

== Mixed martial arts record ==
Professional record breakdown
2 matches	1 win	1 loss
By knockout	0	1
By decision	1	0

Res.	Record	Opponent	Method	Event	Date	Round	Time	Location	Notes
Win	1-1	Jake Bramstone	Decision (Split)	Fighting Spirit 22	June 13, 2005	3	5:00		
Loss	0-1	Lee Hasdell	KO (Flying Knee)	Rings: World Title Series 4	October 20, 2001	1	4:42	Tokyo, Japan	
