= René Sporleder =

German judoka (born 1969)

Medal record

Men's judo

European Championships
Bronze medal – third place	1994 Gdansk	71 kg

René Sporleder (born 30 November 1969) is a German judoka.

== Achievements ==
Year	Tournament	Place	Weight class
1994	European Judo Championships	3rd	Lightweight (71 kg)
