= Volker Heyer =

German judoka (born 1970)

Personal information
- Born: 29 July 1970 (age 56)
- Occupation: Judoka

Sport
- Sport: Judo
Medal record
Representing Germany
European Championships
Silver medal – second place	1997 Ostend	Open
Summer Universiade
Bronze medal – third place	1995 Fukuoka	+95 kg

Profile at external databases
- JudoInside.com: 2148

Volker Heyer (born 29 July 1970) is a German judoka.

== Achievements ==
Year	Tournament	Place	Weight class
1997	European Judo Championships	2nd	Open class
1996	European Judo Championships	7th	Open class
1995	Universiade	3rd	Heavyweight (+95 kg)
1994	Goodwill Games	3rd	Heavyweight (+95 kg)
