= Gabriel Bengtsson =

Swedish judoka (born 1977)

Personal information
- Born: 5 September 1977 (age 49)
- Occupation: Judoka

Sport
- Sport: Judo

Profile at external databases
- JudoInside.com: 3757

Gabriel Bengtsson (born 5 September 1977) is a Swedish judoka.

== Achievements ==
Year	Tournament	Place	Weight class
2006	European Judo Championships	7th	Half lightweight (66 kg)
1997	European Judo Championships	5th	Half lightweight (65 kg)
