= Giorgi Tsmindashvili =

Georgian judoka (born 1976)

Personal information
- Born: 17 May 1976 (age 50) Kvareli, Soviet Union

Sport
- Sport: Judo

Giorgi Tsmindashvili (born 17 May 1976) is a Georgian judoka who competed at the 1996 Summer Olympics.

== Achievements ==
Year	Tournament	Place	Weight class
1997	European Judo Championships	7th	Middleweight (86 kg)
