= Dulce Piña =

Dominican Republic judoka

Personal information
- Full name: Dulce María Piña de Óleo
- Nationality: Dominican
- Born: 12 September 1966 (age 60) San Juan de la Maguana, Dominican Republic
- Occupation: Judoka

Sport
- Sport: Judo
- Event: – 70 kg
Medal record
Women's Judo
Representing the Dominican Republic
Pan American Games
Bronze medal – third place	1995	Middleweight
Bronze medal – third place	2003	Middleweight
Central American and Caribbean Games
Gold medal – first place	2002 San Salvador	– 70 kg
Silver medal – second place	1990 Mexico City	– 70 kg
Silver medal – second place	1993 Ponce	– 70 kg
Silver medal – second place	1998 Maracaibo	– 70 kg
Bronze medal – third place	2002 San Salvador	Open

Profile at external databases
- JudoInside.com: 2082

Dulce María Piña de Óleo (born 12 September 1966 in San Juan de la Maguana) is a retired female judoka from the Dominican Republic, who won the bronze medal in the women's middleweight division (– 70 kg) at the 1995 Pan American Games and 2003 Pan American Games. She represented her native country at the 1996 Summer Olympics in Atlanta, Georgia and four times she won medal in the Central American and Caribbean Games.

== Career ==
Piña was the first women from the Dominican Republic competing in four different Central American and Caribbean Games, winning a silver medal in 1990, 1993 and 1998 before claiming a gold and a bronze in the 2002 edition. She represented her home country during the 1995 Pan American Games held in Mar del Plata, Argentina being the only Dominican women who won a medal when she earned the bronze in the Middleweight – 66 kg category. She also participated in the 2003 Pan American Games held in Santo Domingo, winning the bronze medal in the – 70 kg category.

She was the first judoka women from the Dominican Republic participating in the Olympics when she competed in the Atlanta 1996 Summer Olympics, ranking in ninth place.

Piña retired after the 2003 Pan American Games and was inducted to the Dominican Republic Sports Hall of Fame in 2012. After that she was the president of the national federation during 2012. and named president of the Women's and sports commission of the Dominican Republic Olympic Committee in 2015.
