= Lasha Pipia =

Russian judoka (1975–2021)

Medal record

Men's judo

European Championships
| Silver medal – second place | 2001 Paris | 81 kg |

Lasha Gudaevich Pipia (27 December 1975 – 30 July 2021) was a Russian judoka.

== Achievements ==
| Year | Tournament | Place | Weight class |
|---|---|---|---|
| 2002 | European Judo Championships | 5th | Half middleweight (81 kg) |
| 2001 | European Judo Championships | 2nd | Half middleweight (81 kg) |
