= Evgeni Pechurov =

Russian judoka

Medal record

Men's judo

European Championships
| Silver medal – second place | 1988 Pamplona | 95 kg |
| Bronze medal – third place | 1993 Athens | Open |
| Bronze medal – third place | 1994 Gdansk | Open |

Evgeni Alexandrovich Pechurov (Russian: Евгений Александрович Печуров; born 27 August 1966) is a Russian judoka.

== Achievements ==
| Year | Tournament | Place | Weight class |
|---|---|---|---|
| 1995 | European Judo Championships | 7th | Open class |
| 1994 | European Judo Championships | 3rd | Open class |
| 1994 | Goodwill Games | 3rd | Half heavyweight (95 kg) |
| 1993 | European Judo Championships | 3rd | Open class |
| 1988 | European Judo Championships | 2nd | Half heavyweight (95 kg) |
