= Ralf Akoto =

German judoka (born 1974)

Ralf Akoto (born 31 January 1974) is a German judoka.

== Achievements ==
Year	Tournament	Place	Weight class
1996	European Judo Championships	7th	Lightweight (71 kg)

== See also ==
- History of martial arts
- Martial arts timeline
- Outline of martial arts
