= Han Ji-hwan =

South Korean judoka

- Hangul: 한지환
- Hanja: 韓智煥
- RR: Han Jihwan
- MR: Han Chihwan

Han Ji-hwan (born 5 August 1977) is a Korean former judoka who competed in the 2000 Summer Olympics. He now owns a studio titled Han Martial Arts in Oakland, California. As of 2024 he is a 6th dan black belt and has continued his dojo.
