= Dano Pantić =

Serbian judoka (born 1972)

Personal information
- Born: 2 March 1972 (age 54)

Sport
- Sport: Judo
Medal record
Representing Yugoslavia
European Championships
| Bronze medal – third place | 1997 Ostend | 95 kg |
Mediterranean Games
| Bronze medal – third place | 1997 Bari | 95 kg |

Dano Pantić (Serbian Cyrillic: Дано Пантић; born 2 March 1972) is a Serbian judoka. He won bronze medal at the 1997 European Judo Championships held in Ostend, Belgium. In the same year he won bronze medal at the Mediterranean Games.

== Achievements ==
| Year | Tournament | Place | Weight class |
|---|---|---|---|
| 1997 | World Judo Championships | 7th | Half heavyweight (95 kg) |
| 1997 | European Judo Championships | 3rd | Half heavyweight (95 kg) |
| 1997 | Mediterranean Games | 3rd | Half heavyweight (95 kg) |
| 1993 | European Judo Championships | 7th | Open class |
