= Radka Štusáková =

Czech judoka

Personal information
- Nationality: Czech
- Born: 22 August 1972 (age 54) Teplice nad Bečvou, Czechoslovakia

Sport
- Sport: Judo

Radka Štusáková (born 22 August 1972) is a Czech former judoka. She competed in the women's middleweight event at the 1996 Summer Olympics.
