= Zhang Guangjun (judoka) =

Chinese Olympic judoka

Personal information
- Nationality: Chinese
- Born: 2 April 1975 (age 51)

Sport
- Sport: Judo
Medal record
Men's judo
Representing China
East Asian Games
Bronze medal – third place	2001 Osaka	66 kg

Zhang Guangjun (born 2 April 1975) is a Chinese former judoka who competed in the 1996 Summer Olympics and in the 2000 Summer Olympics.
