= Beata Kucharzewska =

Polish judoka (born 1976)

Personal information
- Born: 31 March 1976 (age 49) Niemodlin, Poland
- Occupation: Judoka
- Height: 164 cm (5 ft 5 in)
- Weight: 56 kg (123 lb)

Sport
- Country: Poland
- Sport: Judo
- Club: AZS Politechnika Opolska

Profile at external databases
- IJF: 53302
- JudoInside.com: 1130

Beata Kucharzewska (born 31 March 1976) is a Polish judoka. She competed in the women's lightweight event at the 1996 Summer Olympics.
