= Donata Burgatta =

Italian judoka (born 1973)

Personal information
- Nationality: Italian
- Born: 26 September 1973 (age 53) Milan, Italy

Sport
- Sport: Judo
Medal record
Representing Italy
Mediterranean Games
Bronze medal – third place	1997 Bari	+72 kg
European Championships
Silver medal – second place	1996 The Hague	Open

Donata Burgatta (born 26 September 1973) is an Italian judoka. She competed in the women's heavyweight event at the 1996 Summer Olympics.
