= Mara Kovačević =

Serbian judoka (born 1975)

Personal information
- Born: 12 December 1975 (age 50)
- Occupation: Judoka

Sport
- Country: Serbia
- Sport: Judo
- Weight class: +78 kg, Open

Achievements and titles
- Olympic Games: R16 (2000)
- World Champ.: (bronze) (2003)
- European Champ.: (bronze) (2001)
Medal record
Women's judo
Representing Serbia
World Championships
| Bronze medal – third place | 2003 Osaka | Open |
European Championships
| Bronze medal – third place | 2001 Paris | +78 kg |
European Junior Championships
| Bronze medal – third place | 1991 Pieksämäki | +72 kg |
Mediterranean Games
| Bronze medal – third place | 1997 Bari | +72 kg |
| Bronze medal – third place | 2001 Tunisia | +78 kg |

Profile at external databases
- IJF: 54721
- JudoInside.com: 3002
- Updated on 19 November 2022

Mara Kovačević (Serbian Cyrillic: Мара Ковачевић; born 12 December 1975) is a Serbian judoka.

She represented FR Yugoslavia at the 2000 Summer Olympics. Kovačević won bronze medals at the 2001 European Judo Championships in Paris and 2003 World Judo Championships in Osaka. She also won 2 bronze medals at the Mediterranean Games.

In 2002, the Olympic Committee of Serbia decided to declare her the sportswoman of the year.
