= Judo at the 2000 Summer Olympics – Men's 100 kg =

Judo competition

Men's 100 kg at the Games of the XXVII Olympiad
- Venue: Sydney Convention and Exhibition Centre
- Date: 21 September 2000
- Competitors: 33 from 33 nations

Medalists
1st place, gold medalist(s)		Kōsei Inoue	Japan
2nd place, silver medalist(s)		Nicolas Gill	Canada
3rd place, bronze medalist(s)		Yury Styopkin	Russia
3rd place, bronze medalist(s)		Stéphane Traineau	France

Men's 100 kg competition in judo at the 2000 Summer Olympics was held on 21 September at the Sydney Convention and Exhibition Centre.

This event was the second-heaviest of the men's judo weight classes, limiting competitors to a maximum of 100 kilograms of body mass. Like all other judo events, bouts lasted five minutes. If the bout was still tied at the end, it was extended for another five-minute, sudden-death period; if neither judoka scored during that period, the match is decided by the judges. The tournament bracket consisted of a single-elimination contest culminating in a gold medal match. There was also a repechage to determine the winners of the two bronze medals. Each judoka who had lost to a semifinalist competed in the repechage. The two judokas who lost in the semifinals faced the winner of the opposite half of the bracket's repechage in bronze medal bouts.

== Schedule ==
All times are Australian Eastern Daylight Time (UTC+11:00)

Date	Time	Round
Thursday, 21 September 2000	15:00; 20:30	Preliminaries & Repechage; Final

== Tournament results ==
=== Final ===
Final
1	Nicolas Gill (CAN)	0001
2	Kōsei Inoue (JPN)	1001

=== Mat 1 ===
First round matches

	Score	
Bassel El Gharbawy (EGY)	1000–0000	Song Qitao (CHN)

Elimination rounds

Round of 32
Leonid Svirin (BLR)	0100
Radu Ivan (ROM)	0000
Iveri Jikurauli (GEO)	1010
Yen Kuo-che (TPE)	0000
Bassel El Gharbawy (EGY)	0001
Pedro Soares (POR)	1000
Nicolas Gill (CAN)	1010
Ben Sonnemans (NED)	0000
Franz Birkfellner (AUT)	0201
José Augusto Geraldino (DOM)	0000
Vadim Sergeev (KGZ)	0010
Ato Hand (USA)	1000
Stéphane Traineau (FRA)	1011
Yury Styopkin (RUS)	0000
Jang Sung-ho (KOR)	0111
Sami Belgroun (ALG)	1000

Round of 16
Radu Ivan (ROM)	0001
Iveri Jikurauli (GEO)	1001
Pedro Soares (POR)	0000
Nicolas Gill (CAN)	0201
Franz Birkfellner (AUT)	0000
Ato Hand (USA)	1000
Stéphane Traineau (FRA)	0200
Sami Belgroun (ALG)	0000

Quarterfinals
Iveri Jikurauli (GEO)	0010
Nicolas Gill (CAN)	0011
Ato Hand (USA)	0000
Stéphane Traineau (FRA)	1001

Semifinals
Nicolas Gill (CAN)	0012
Stéphane Traineau (FRA)	0010

=== Mat 2 ===
Round of 32
Kōsei Inoue (JPN)	1000
Yosvani Kessel (CUB)	0000
Luís Gregorio López (VEN)	0000
Daniel Gowing (NZL)	1101
Askhat Zhitkeyev (KAZ)	0011
Antal Kovács (HUN)	0200
Ariel Ze'evi (ISR)	1110
Paweł Nastula (POL)	0000
Marius Paškevičius (LTU)	1000
Alejandro Bender (ARG)	0000
Mário Sabino (BRA)	1020
Daniel Gürschner (GER)	0010
Sadok Khalki (TUN)	0022
Daniel Rusitovic (AUS)	0010
Armen Bagdasarov (UZB)	0022
Luigi Guido (ITA)	0100

Round of 16
Kōsei Inoue (JPN)	1000
Daniel Gowing (NZL)	0000
Antal Kovács (HUN)	0000
Ariel Ze'evi (ISR)	1011
Marius Paškevičius (LTU)	0003
Mário Sabino (BRA)	1000
Sadok Khalki (TUN)	0000
Luigi Guido (ITA)	1010

Quarterfinals
Kōsei Inoue (JPN)	1011
Ariel Ze'evi (ISR)	0000
Mário Sabino (BRA)	0001
Luigi Guido (ITA)	1001

Semifinals
Kōsei Inoue (JPN)	0210
Luigi Guido (ITA)	0000

=== Repechage ===
The losing semifinalists as well as those judoka eliminated in earlier rounds by the four semifinalists of the main bracket advanced to the repechage. These matches determined the two bronze medalists for the event.

First round
Ben Sonnemans (NED)	0110
Pedro Soares (POR)	0100
Yury Styopkin (RUS)	1000
Sami Belgroun (ALG)	0100
Yosvani Kessel (CUB)	1000
Daniel Gowing (NZL)	0001
Armen Bagdasarov (UZB)	1000
Sadok Khalki (TUN)	0000

Second round
Ben Sonnemans (NED)	0001
Iveri Jikurauli (GEO)	0110
Yury Styopkin (RUS)	0200
Ato Hand (USA)	0000
Yosvani Kessel (CUB)	0010
Ariel Ze'evi (ISR)	0120
Armen Bagdasarov (UZB)	0010
Mário Sabino (BRA)	0010

Third round
Iveri Jikurauli (GEO)	0010
Yury Styopkin (RUS)	1011
Ariel Ze'evi (ISR)	1111
Mário Sabino (BRA)	0001

Bronze medal finals
Yury Styopkin (RUS)	1000
Luigi Guido (ITA)	0000
Ariel Ze'evi (ISR)	0000
Stéphane Traineau (FRA)	1000
