= Judo at the 1992 Summer Olympics – Men's 95 kg =

Judo at the Olympics

Men's 95 kg at the Games of the XXV Olympiad
- Venue: Palau Blaugrana
- Date: 28 July 1992
- Competitors: 34 from 34 nations

Medalists
1st place, gold medalist(s)		Antal Kovács	Hungary
2nd place, silver medalist(s)		Raymond Stevens	Great Britain
3rd place, bronze medalist(s)		Theo Meijer	Netherlands
3rd place, bronze medalist(s)		Dmitri Sergeyev	Unified Team

The men's 95 kg competition in judo at the 1992 Summer Olympics in Barcelona was held on 28 July at the Palau Blaugrana. The gold medal was won by Antal Kovács of Hungary.

== Results ==
=== Main brackets ===
==== Pool A ====
Round of 64
Jorge Aguirre (ARG)	YUK
Pat Roberge (CAN)	E
Radu Ivan (ROU)	WAZ
Detlef Knorrek (GER)	E

Round of 32
Jorge Aguirre (ARG)	WIP
Moussa Sall (SEN)	E
Joseph Ndjumbi (GAB)	E
Odvogiin Baljinnyam (MGL)	IPO
Pawel Nastula (POL)	IPO
Yun Sang-sik (KOR)	RA
Pascal Caya (CAF)	DNS
Robert Van de Walle (BEL)	WO
Radu Ivan (ROU)	IPO
Parnel Legros (HAI)	E
Indrek Pertelson (EST)	RA
Raymond Stevens (GBR)	IPO
Belarmino Salgado (CUB)	IPO
Ilias Nikas (GRE)	E
Luigi Guido (ITA)	IPO
Simon Magalashvili (ISR)	E

Round of 16
Jorge Aguirre (ARG)	E
Odvogiin Baljinnyam (MGL)	KEI
Pawel Nastula (POL)	IPO
Robert Van de Walle (BEL)	RA
Radu Ivan (ROU)	RA
Raymond Stevens (GBR)	WIP
Belarmino Salgado (CUB)	WAZ
Luigi Guido (ITA)	E

Quarterfinal
Odvogiin Baljinnyam (MGL)	RA
Pawel Nastula (POL)	IPO
Raymond Stevens (GBR)	IPO
Belarmino Salgado (CUB)	RA

Semifinal
Pawel Nastula (POL)	RB
Raymond Stevens (GBR)	YUS

==== Pool B ====
Round of 64
Stéphane Traineau (FRA)	IPO
Hengky Pie (INA)	E

Round of 32
Stéphane Traineau (FRA)	IPO
Bjarni Friðriksson (ISL)	E
Leo White (USA)	WIP
Aiman El-Shewy (EGY)	E
Yasuhiro Kai (JPN)	IPO
Dano Pantic (IOA)	E
Theo Meijer (NED)	YUK
Vladas Burba (LTU)	RB
Mamute Mbonga (ZAI)	E
Aurélio Miguel (BRA)	HAN
Jirí Sosna (TCH)	WIP
Mohamed Doukouré (GUI)	E
Antal Kovács (HUN)	WIP
Moisés Torres (ANG)	RB
Vadims Voinovs (LAT)	E
Dmitri Sergeyev (EUN)	KEI

Round of 16
Stéphane Traineau (FRA)	E
Leo White (USA)	IPO
Yasuhiro Kai (JPN)	RB
Theo Meijer (NED)	YUK
Aurélio Miguel (BRA)	KEI
Jirí Sosna (TCH)	E
Antal Kovács (HUN)	YUK
Dmitri Sergeyev (EUN)	RB

Quarterfinal
Leo White (USA)	RB
Theo Meijer (NED)	CHU
Aurélio Miguel (BRA)	RB
Antal Kovács (HUN)	WAZ

Semifinal
Theo Meijer (NED)	RA
Antal Kovács (HUN)	YUK

=== Repechages ===
==== Repechage A ====
Repechage round 1
Yun Sang-sik (KOR)	E
Robert Van de Walle (BEL)	IPO
Indrek Pertelson (EST)	SOG
Radu Ivan (ROU)	E

Repechage quarterfinal
Robert Van de Walle (BEL)	YUS
Odvogiin Baljinnyam (MGL)	E
Indrek Pertelson (EST)	IPO
Belarmino Salgado (CUB)	E

Repechage semifinal
Robert Van de Walle (BEL)	E
Indrek Pertelson (EST)	IPO

Repechage final
Indrek Pertelson (EST)	E
Theo Meijer (NED)	KEI (bronze)

==== Repechage B ====
Repechage round 1
Vladas Burba (LTU)	E
Yasuhiro Kai (JPN)	YUS
Moisés Torres (ANG)	E
Dmitri Sergeyev (EUN)	IPO

Repechage quarterfinal
Yasuhiro Kai (JPN)	SOG
Leo White (USA)	E
Dmitri Sergeyev (EUN)	IPO
Aurélio Miguel (BRA)	E

Repechage semifinal
Yasuhiro Kai (JPN)	E
Dmitri Sergeyev (EUN)	IPO

Repechage final
Dmitri Sergeyev (EUN)	WAZ (bronze)
Pawel Nastula (POL)	E

=== Final ===
Final
Raymond Stevens (GBR)	2nd place, silver medalist(s)
Antal Kovács (HUN)	YUK (gold)

== Final classification ==
Rank	Judoka	Nation
1st place, gold medalist(s)	Antal Kovács	Hungary
2nd place, silver medalist(s)	Raymond Stevens	Great Britain
3rd place, bronze medalist(s)	Theo Meijer	Netherlands
3rd place, bronze medalist(s)	Dmitri Sergeyev	Unified Team
5T	Indrek Pertelson	Estonia
5T	Pawel Nastula	Poland
7T	Robert Van de Walle	Belgium
7T	Yasuhiro Kai	Japan
9T	Odvogiin Baljinnyam	Mongolia
9T	Belarmino Salgado	Cuba
9T	Leo White	United States
9T	Aurélio Miguel	Brazil
13T	Yun Sang-sik	South Korea
13T	Vladas Burba	Lithuania
13T	Moisés Torres	Angola
13T	Radu Ivan	Romania
17T	Jorge Aguirre	Argentina
17T	Luigi Guido	Italy
17T	Stéphane Traineau	France
17T	Jirí Sosna	Czechoslovakia
21T	Moussa Sall	Senegal
21T	Joseph Ndjumbi	Gabon
21T	Simon Magalashvili	Israel
21T	Vadims Voinovs	Latvia
21T	Parnel Legros	Haiti
21T	Ilias Nikas	Greece
21T	Bjarni Friðriksson	Iceland
21T	Aiman El-Shewy	Egypt
21T	Dano Pantic	Independent Olympic Athletes
21T	Mohamed Doukouré	Guinea
21T	Mamute Mbonga	Zaire
32T	Pat Roberge	Canada
32T	Detlef Knorrek	Germany
32T	Hengky Pie	Indonesia
