= Judo at the 1996 Summer Olympics – Men's 95 kg =

Judo competition

Men's 95kg at the Games of the XXVI Olympiad
- Venue: Georgia World Congress Center
- Date: 21 July 1996
- Competitors: 32 from 32 nations

Medalists
1st place, gold medalist(s)		Pawel Nastula	Poland
2nd place, silver medalist(s)		Kim Min-soo	South Korea
3rd place, bronze medalist(s)		Stéphane Traineau	France
3rd place, bronze medalist(s)		Aurélio Miguel	Brazil

These are the results of the Men's 95 kg (also known as Half Heavyweight) competition in judo at the 1996 Summer Olympics in Atlanta, Georgia. A total of 32 men competed in this event, limited to jūdōka whose body weight was less than, or equal to, 95 kilograms. Competition took place in the Georgia World Congress Center.

The gold and silver medals were determined by a single-elimination tournament, with the winner of the final taking gold and the loser receiving silver. Judo events awarded two bronze medals. Quarterfinal losers competed in a repechage match for the right to face a semifinal loser for a bronze medal (that is, the judokas defeated in quarterfinals A and B competed against each other, with the winner of that match facing the semifinal loser from the other half of the bracket).

== Tournament results ==
=== First round ===
As there were more than 32 qualifiers for the tournament, three first round matches were held to reduce the field to 32 judoka.

- Semir Pepic (SVK) defeated Mohamed Bu Sakher (KUW)

=== Main bracket ===
The gold and silver medalists were determined by the final match of the main single-elimination bracket.

1st Round
Bender (ARG)	L
Miguel (BRA)	W
Shakimov (KAZ)	W
Qerewaqa (FIJ)	L
Bouza (URU)	L
Felicité (MRI)	W
Gutiérrez (MEX)	L
Morgan (CAN)	W
Nastula (POL)	W
Kovács (HUN)	L
Guido (ITA)	W
Nazriev (TJK)	L
Sanchez (CUB)	W
Ivan (ROU)	L
Knorrek (GER)	L
Soares (POR)	W
Sonnemans (NED)	W
El Gharbawy (EGY)	L
Stevens (GBR)	W
Þorleifsson (ISL)	L
Kim (KOR)	W
Sergeyev (RUS)	W
Solovyov (UZB)	L
Nakamura (JPN)	W
Gómez (CRC)	L
Capo (USA)	L
Lobzhanidze (GEO)	W
Traineau (FRA)	W
Svirid (BLR)	L
Gowing (NZL)	W
Pepic (SVK)	L

2nd Round
Miguel (BRA)	W
Shakimov (KAZ)	L
Felicite (MRI)	W
Morgan (CAN)	L
Nastula (POL)	W
Guido (ITA)	L
Sánchez (CUB)	L
Soares (POR)	W
Sonnemans (NED)	W
Stevens (GBR)	L
Kim (KOR)	W
Sergeyev (RUS)	L
Nakamura (JPN)	W
Lobzhanidze (GEO)	L
Traineau (FRA)	W
Gowing (NZL)	L

Quarterfinals
Miguel (BRA)	W
Felicite (MRI)	L
Nastula (POL)	W
Soares (POR)	L
Sonnemans (NED)	L
Kim (KOR)	W
Nakamura (JPN)	L
Traineau (FRA)	W

Semifinals
Miguel (BRA)	L
Nastula (POL)	W
Kim (KOR)	W
Traineau (FRA)	L

Gold medal final
Nastula (POL)	W
Kim (KOR)	L

=== Repechage ===
The losing semifinalists as well as those judoka eliminated in earlier rounds by the four semifinalists of the main bracket advanced to the repechage. These matches determined the two bronze medalists for the event.

First round
Bender (ARG)	W
Shakimov (KAZ)	L
Kovács (HUN)	W
Guido (ITA)	L
Thorleifsson (ISL)	L
Sergeev (RUS)	W
Svirid (BLR)	L
Gowing (NZL)	W

Second round
Felicite (MRI)	L
Bender (ARG)	W
Soares (POR)	L
Kovács (HUN)	W
Sonnemans (NED)	W
Sergeev (RUS)
Nakamura (JPN)	W
Gowing (NZL)	L

Third round
Bender (ARG)	L
Kovács (HUN)	W
Sonnemans (NED)	W
Nakamura (JPN)	L

Bronze medal finals
Traineau (FRA)	W
Kovács (HUN)	L
Miguel (BRA)	W
Sonnemans (NED)	L
