= Kim Min-soo (judoka) =

Korean kickboxer, judoka and mixed martial artist

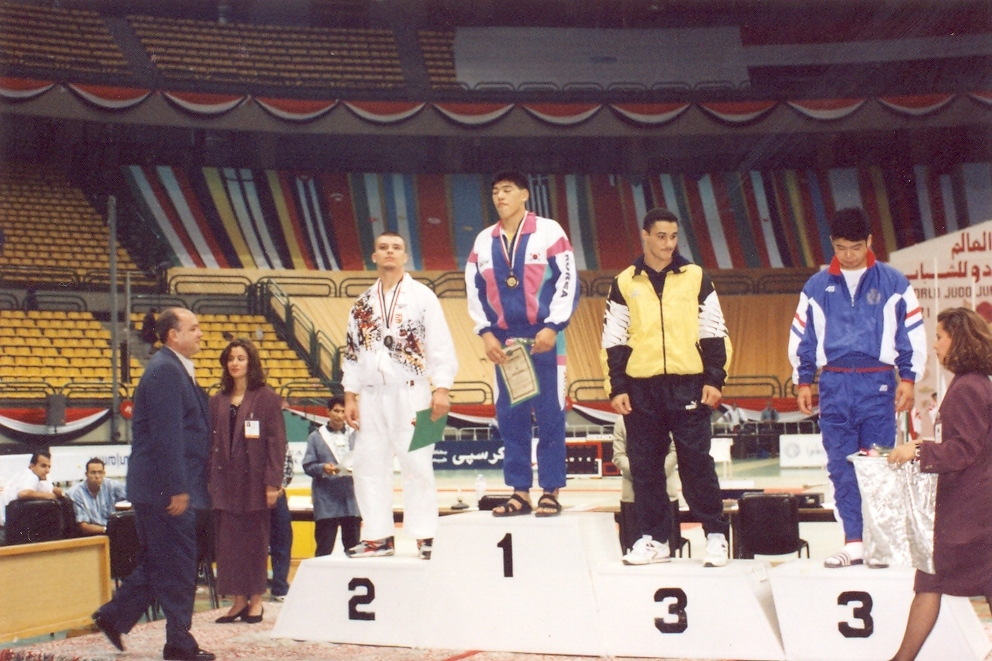
- Kim in the first place at the Junior World Championships in Cairo in November 1994
- Born: January 22, 1975 (age 51); Daebang-dong, Dongjak-gu, Seoul, South Korea
- Other names: Mr. Shark
- Height: 6 ft 1 in (1.85 m)
- Weight: 242 lb (110 kg; 17 st 4 lb)
- Division: Heavyweight
- Style: Judo, Kickboxing
- Stance: Southpaw
- Fighting out of: Seoul, South Korea
- Team: RINGS Korea; Korean Top Team (2005–present)
- Years active: 1994–2003 (Judo); 2005–2009 (MMA); 2006–2008 (Kickboxing)

Kickboxing record
- Total: 5
- Wins: 4
- Losses: 1
- By knockout: 1

Mixed martial arts record
- Total: 10
- Wins: 3
- By knockout: 1
- By submission: 2
- Losses: 7
- By knockout: 6
- By submission: 1

Other information
- Mixed martial arts record from Sherdog
- Judo career
- Weight class: ‍–‍95 kg
- Rank: 4th dan black belt

Judo achievements and titles
- Olympic Games: (silver) (1996)
- World Champ.: R16 (1995)
Medal record
Men's judo
Representing South Korea
Olympic Games
Silver medal – second place	1996 Atlanta	‍–‍95 kg
World Juniors Championships
Gold medal – first place	1994 Cairo	‍–‍95 kg

Profile at external judo databases
- IJF: 53435
- JudoInside.com: 6490

- Kim Min-soo
- Hangul: 김민수
- Hanja: 金岷秀
- RR: Gim Minsu
- MR: Kim Minsu

Kim Min-soo (born January 22, 1975) is a South Korean former judoka, professional mixed martial artist and K-1 kickboxer. He is best known for becoming a K-1 World Grand Prix 2006 in Seoul finalist and also winning a Silver Medal in Judo at the 1996 Summer Olympics in Atlanta. He is also known for his fights with WWE professional wrestler and UFC heavyweight champion Brock Lesnar, WWE wrestler and K-1 fighter Sean O'Haire, and NFL player turned kickboxer and New Japan Pro-Wrestling contender Bob Sapp. Min-soo holds a notable kickboxing win over Muay Thai world champion Mourad Bouzidi. He announced his retirement from contact sports in 2011, with subsequent stints as color commentator for Japanese and Korean mixed martial arts and professional wrestling events. Kim is also the head judo coach for the Korean Top Team.

== Career ==
=== Judo ===
By the time he was 19, Kim was competing internationally in major judo tournaments - winning the gold medal at the 1994 World Junior Championships in Cairo by defeating Istvan Szasz in the -95 kilogram division. He entered the 1996 Summer Olympics as a half-heavyweight member of the South Korean national team, in which capacity he reached the finals and earned the silver medal by defeating Stéphane Traineau but losing to Pawel Nastula. He remained active in the sport for another seven years, medaling in at least five international tournaments and three world cup events.

Kim's career includes wins over Keith Morgan, Detlef Knorrek, Vernharð Þorleifsson, Dmitri Sergeyev, Ben Sonnemans, and Nicolas Gill.

=== Mixed martial arts ===
Kim made his mixed martial arts debut at the Hero's 1 event on March 26, 2005, against kickboxer and mixed martial artist Bob Sapp. Despite a promising start wherein Kim negated Sapp's charging attacks and dealt him a facial laceration that necessitated a medical time-out, Sapp struck Kim in the face immediately after the match resumed and knocked him out. At Hero's 2 in the following July, Kim met kickboxer Ray Sefo in a longer but ultimately similar fight wherein Sefo first stunned Kim with strikes before finishing him with a kick to the head.

Kim's subsequent bout in the following November against pro wrestler Sean O'Haire and seasoned fighter Yoshihisa Yamamoto in March 2006 proved more fruitful, allowing Kim to utilize his grappling expertise and defeat both opponents by submission. This was followed by a string of losses against increasingly imposing opponents over the following 15 months. Semmy Schilt escaped Kim's forearm choke and trapped him in a guard before punching him into submission. Don Frye and Mighty Mo knocked him out with strikes. In arguably Kim's most famous match, he replaced Choi Hong-man on short notice to face pro wrestler Brock Lesnar in the latter's debut fight, wherein he submitted to Lesnar's punches after being taken down.

At Hero's 2007 in Korea in October, Kim secured the third victory of his MMA career in an openweight bout against Ikuhisa Minowa, winning by technical knockout with a series of punches. His final fight took place about two years later on November 27, 2009, at The Khan 2, where he was knocked out by former sumo wrestler Sentoryū Henri. His record stands at 3 wins and 7 losses.

=== Kickboxing ===
Kim made his kickboxing debut on March 3, 2006, at the K-1 World Grand Prix 2006 in Seoul tournament. In his quarterfinal match, he met South Korean sumo wrestler Kim Kyoung-Suk. The bout was unorthodox, with both fighters employing spins and jumping kicks and the much larger Kyoung-Suk chasing Min-soo across the ring. At one point, the judoka slipped while attempting a kick and the rikishi made as though to stomp him, resulting in a point deduction for unsportsmanlike conduct. The penalty gave Min-soo the advantage and he earned a unanimous decision victory.

In the following round, Kim met seasoned Muay Thai champion Mourad Bouzidi. Despite Bouzidi's superior technique and powerful low kicks, Kim displayed greater aggression and upper body strength, resulting in both fighters scoring a knockdown apiece and meeting after the initial three rounds for an additional three minutes. After enduring a low blow, Kim finished strongly and was able to move on to the finals against Yusuke Fujimoto. The Japanese karateka struck with low kicks, working on Kim's already-battered legs until he limped. Eventually, Kim fell to Fujimoto's punching combinations in the second round for a knockout loss.

Kim fought twice more for K-1, ending his kickboxing career with a 4–1 record following a win over American Scott Junk at the K-1 World Grand Prix 2008 in Hawaii on September 8.

== Achievements and titles ==
Kickboxing

- K-1 World Grand Prix 2006 in Seoul Runner-up

Judo

- 2003 Iran FAJR International (100 kg) - Gold medalist
- 2001 Pacific Rim Judo Championships (+100 kg) - Silver medalist
- 2001 Pacific Rim Judo Championships (-100 kg) - Silver medalist
- 2000 Iran FAJR International (Absolute) - Silver medalist
- 2000 Iran FAJR International (100 kg) - Bronze medalist
- 1999 British Open (-100 kg) - Bronze medalist
- 1998 Matsutaro Shoriki Cup (-100 kg) - Silver medalist
- 1997 World Masters Championship (-95 kg) - Bronze medalist
- 1997 ASKO World Championships (-95k g) - Bronze medalist
- 1997 Tournoi de Paris World Championship (-95 kg) - Bronze medalist
- 1996 Atlanta Olympics Men's Half Heavyweight Judo - Silver medalist
- 1996 World Masters Championship (-95 kg) - 7th place
- 1996 ASKO World Championships (-95 kg) - Bronze medalist
- 1995 Moscow International Championships (-95 kg) - 5th place
- 1994 World Junior Championships (-95 kg) - Gold medalist
- 1994 Torneo Citta di Roma (-95 kg) - Bronze medalist

== Mixed martial arts record ==
Professional record breakdown
10 matches	3 wins	7 losses
By knockout	1	6
By submission	2	1

Res.	Record	Opponent	Method	Event	Date	Round	Time	Location	Notes
Loss	3–7	Sentoryu Henri	KO (punches and knees)	The Khan 2	November 27, 2009	1	1:12	Seoul, South Korea	
Win	3–6	Ikuhisa Minowa	TKO (punches)	Hero's 2007 in Korea	October 28, 2007	1	3:46	Seoul, South Korea	
Loss	2–6	Brock Lesnar	TKO (submission to punches)	K-1 Dynamite!! USA	June 2, 2007	1	1:09	Los Angeles, California, United States	
Loss	2–5	Mighty Mo	KO (punch)	Hero's 8	March 12, 2007	1	2:37	Nagoya, Japan	
Loss	2–4	Don Frye	KO (punch)	Hero's 7	October 9, 2006	2	2:47	Yokohama, Japan	
Loss	2–3	Semmy Schilt	Submission (triangle choke)	Hero's 6	August 5, 2006	1	4:46	Tokyo, Japan	
Win	2–2	Yoshihisa Yamamoto	Submission (rear-naked choke)	Hero's 4	March 15, 2006	2	1:32	Tokyo, Japan	
Win	1–2	Sean O'Haire	Submission (guillotine choke)	Hero's 2005 in Seoul	November 5, 2005	1	4:46	Seoul, South Korea	
Loss	0–2	Ray Sefo	KO (head kick)	Hero's 2	July 6, 2005	2	0:30	Tokyo, Japan	
Loss	0–1	Bob Sapp	KO (punches)	Hero's 1	March 26, 2005	1	1:12	Saitama, Saitama, Japan	

== Kickboxing record ==
4 Wins (4 Decisions) – 1 Loss (1 (T)KO) – 0 Draws
Date	Result	Record	Opponent	Event	Method	Round
2008-09-08	Win	4–1	(United States) Scott Junk	K-1 World Grand Prix 2008 in Hawaii	Decision	3
2007-09-29	Win	3–1	(South Korea) Randy Kim	K-1 World Grand Prix 2007 in Seoul Final 16	Decision (Unanimous)	3
2006-03-06	Loss	2–1	(Japan) Yusuke Fujimoto	K-1 World Grand Prix 2006 in Seoul	KO (Right hook)	2
2006-03-06	Win	2–0	(Tunisia) Mourad Bouzidi	K-1 World Grand Prix 2006 in Seoul	Ext.R Decision (Unanimous)	4
2006-03-06	Win	1–0	(South Korea) Kim Kyoung-Suk	K-1 World Grand Prix 2006 in Seoul	Decision (Unanimous)	3

== Filmography ==
=== Television show ===
Year	Title	Role	Ref.
2022	The First Business in the World	Contestant	
