= Judo at the 1998 Asian Games – Men's 100 kg =

Judo competition

Men's 100 kg at the 1998 Asian Games
- Venue: Thammasat Gymnasium 1
- Date: 10 December 1998
- Competitors: 11 from 11 nations

Medalists
gold medal	Kosei Inoue	Japan
silver medal	Armen Bagdasarov	Uzbekistan
bronze medal	Farhad Maabi	Iran
bronze medal	Park Sung-keun	South Korea

The men's 100 kilograms (Half heavyweight) competition at the 1998 Asian Games in Bangkok was held on 10 December 1998 at the Thammasat Gymnasium 1.

== Schedule ==
All times are Indochina Time (UTC+07:00)

Date	Time	Event
Thursday, 10 December 1998	14:00	Round 1
Thursday, 10 December 1998	14:00	Quarterfinals
Thursday, 10 December 1998	14:00	Repechage
Thursday, 10 December 1998	14:00	Semifinals
Thursday, 10 December 1998	14:00	Finals

== Results ==
Legend

- IPP — Won by ippon
- KOK — Won by koka
- WO — Won by walkover
- YUK — Won by yuko

=== Main bracket ===
Round 1
Kosei Inoue (JPN)	IPP
Rulan Alimkhanov (KAZ)
Vadim Sergeyev (KGZ)
Park Sung-keun (KOR)	IPP
Armen Bagdasarov (UZB)	IPP
Bancha Thanomket (THA)

Quarterfinals
Alex Valdez (PHI)
Kosei Inoue (JPN)	IPP
Park Sung-keun (KOR)	IPP
Izzeddin Hamada (PLE)
Fakhriddin Rakhimov (TJK)
Armen Bagdasarov (UZB)	WO
Jambalyn Ganbold (MGL)
Farhad Maabi (IRI)	IPP

Semifinals
Kosei Inoue (JPN)	IPP
Park Sung-keun (KOR)
Armen Bagdasarov (UZB)	IPP
Farhad Maabi (IRI)

Final
Kosei Inoue (JPN)	IPP
Armen Bagdasarov (UZB)

=== Repechage ===
Repechage 1
Rulan Alimkhanov (KAZ)	IPP
Alex Valdez (PHI)
Vadim Sergeyev (KGZ)	IPP
Izzeddin Hamada (PLE)
Bancha Thanomket (THA)	WO
Fakhriddin Rakhimov (TJK)

Repechage 2
Rulan Alimkhanov (KAZ)
Vadim Sergeyev (KGZ)	YUK
Bancha Thanomket (THA)
Jambalyn Ganbold (MGL)	IPP

Bronze medals
Vadim Sergeyev (KGZ)
Farhad Maabi (IRI)	KOK
Jambalyn Ganbold (MGL)
Park Sung-keun (KOR)	IPP
