= Uruguay at the 1996 Summer Olympics =

- IOC code: URU
- NOC: Uruguayan Olympic Committee
- Website: www.cou.org.uy (in Spanish)

in Atlanta
- Competitors: 14 (12 men and 2 women) in 8 sports
- Flag bearer: Marcelo Filippini
- Medals: Gold 0 Silver 0 Bronze 0 Total 0

Summer Olympics appearances (overview)
- 1924; 1928; 1932; 1936; 1948; 1952; 1956; 1960; 1964; 1968; 1972; 1976; 1980; 1984; 1988; 1992; 1996; 2000; 2004; 2008; 2012; 2016; 2020; 2024

Uruguay competed at the 1996 Summer Olympics in Atlanta, United States.

== Competitors ==
The following is the list of number of competitors in the Games.

Sport	Men	Women	Total
Athletics	2	0	2
Cycling	3	0	3
Diving	0	1	1
Judo	2	0	2
Sailing	2	0	2
Swimming	1	1	2
Tennis	1	0	1
Weightlifting	1	–	1
Total	12	2	14

== Athletics ==
Men
Track and road events

Athlete	Event	Heats		Quarterfinal		Semifinal		Final	
Athlete	Event	Result	Rank	Result	Rank	Result	Rank	Result	Rank
Waldemar Cotelo	Marathon	—N/a						2:28:50	79
Ricardo Vera	3000 metres steeplechase	8:40.78	26	—N/a		Did not advance			

== Cycling ==
=== Road ===
Men

Athlete	Event	Time	Rank
Gregorio Bare	Road race	DNF	
Ricardo Guedes	Road race	DNF	

=== Track ===
Points race

Athlete	Event	Laps	Points	Rank
Milton Wynants	Men's points race	±0 laps	6	11

== Diving ==
Women

Athlete	Event	Preliminary		Semifinal		Final	
Athlete	Event	Points	Rank	Points	Rank	Points	Rank
Ana Carolina Itzaina	10 m platform	191.40	30	Did not advance			

== Judo ==
Men

Athlete	Event	Round of 64	Round of 32	Round of 16	Quarterfinals	Semifinals	Repechage			Final	
Athlete	Event	Round of 64	Round of 32	Round of 16	Quarterfinals	Semifinals	Round 1	Round 2	Round 3	Final	
Athlete	Event	Opposition Result	Opposition Result	Opposition Result	Opposition Result	Opposition Result	Opposition Result	Opposition Result	Opposition Result	Opposition Result	Rank
Jorge Steffano	–65 kg	Bye	MacKinnon (RSA); L	Did not advance							
Willan Bouza	–95 kg	Bye	Felicité (MRI); L	Did not advance							

== Sailing ==
Men

Athlete	Event	Race									Net points	Final rank
Athlete	Event	1	2	3	4	5	6	7	8	9	Net points	Final rank
Andrés Isola	Mistral One Design	16	38	~~40~~	~~47~~	38	30	30	38	37	227	39

Open
Fleet racing

Athlete	Event	Race											Net points	Final rank
Athlete	Event	1	2	3	4	5	6	7	8	9	10	11	Net points	Final rank
Ricardo Fabini	Laser	25	12	~~38~~	23	22	32	16	30	35	~~57~~	21	216	30

== Swimming ==
Men

Athlete	Event	Heats		Final A/B	
Athlete	Event	Time	Rank	Time	Rank
Javier Golovchenko	100 m butterfly	55.26	33	Did not advance	
Javier Golovchenko	200 m butterfly	2:04.96	37	Did not advance	

Women

Athlete	Event	Heats		Final A/B	
Athlete	Event	Time	Rank	Time	Rank
Erika Graf	200 m breaststroke	2:42.97	35	Did not advance	

== Tennis ==
Men

Athlete	Event	Round of 64	Round of 32	Round of 16	Quarterfinals	Semifinals	Final	
Athlete	Event	Opposition Result	Opposition Result	Opposition Result	Opposition Result	Opposition Result	Opposition Result	Rank
Marcelo Filippini	Singles	Morejón (ECU); W 6^{3}–7, 7–5, 6–1	Furlan (ITA); L 5–7, 2–6	Did not advance				

== Weightlifting ==
Athlete	Event	Snatch		Clean & jerk		Total	Rank
Athlete	Event	Result	Rank	Result	Rank	Total	Rank
Edward Silva	–76 kg	120.0	20	147.5	19	267.5	19

== See also ==
- Uruguay at the 1995 Pan American Games
