= 1986 World Sambo Championships =

Sambo competitions

- Location: Saint-Jean-de-Luz, France

The 1986 World Sambo Championships were held in Saint-Jean-de-Luz, France in November 1986. Championships were organized by FIAS.

== Medal overview ==
men	Gold	Silver	Bronze
-48 kg	(Soviet Union) Andrey Khodyrev (URS)^{RUS}	(Bulgaria) Dimitar Dimitrov (BUL)	(Mongolia) Kh. Bayarsayman (MGL)
-52 kg	(Soviet Union) Babamurat Fayziyev (URS)^{UZB}	(Mongolia) Khaltmaagiin Battulga (MGL)	(France) D. Suarez (FRA)
-57 kg	(Soviet Union) Anton Novikov (URS)^{RUS}	(Mongolia) Z. Batsukhid (MGL)	(Japan) S. Kobayashi (JPN)
-62 kg	(Soviet Union) Aleksandr Aksenov (URS)^{RUS}	(Bulgaria) N. Gushmakov (BUL)	(Mongolia) S. Ganbaatar (MGL)
-68 kg	(Soviet Union) Vladimir Panyshin (URS)^{RUS}	(Mongolia) T. Urjavan (MGL)	(Bulgaria) Ivan Netov (BUL)
-74 kg	(Mongolia) Jambalyn Ganbold (MGL)	(Soviet Union) Vasily Shvaya (URS)^{RUS}	(Bulgaria) S. Nachev (BUL)
-82 kg	(France) Didier Duru (FRA)	(Mongolia) Zunduyn Delgerdalay (MGL)	(Soviet Union) Anatoly Yakovlev (URS)^{RUS}
-90 kg	(Mongolia) Odvogiin Baljinnyam (MGL)	(Bulgaria) Georgi Petrov (BUL)	(Soviet Union) G. Mdzeluri (URS)^{BLR}
-100 kg	(Mongolia) Badmaanyambuugiin Bat-Erdene (MGL)	(Bulgaria) S. Stoyanov (BUL)	(Soviet Union) Mikhail Kokorin (URS)^{RUS}
+100 kg	(Soviet Union) Vladimir Shkalov (URS)^{RUS}	(United Kingdom) Martin Clarke (GBR)	(Mongolia) Sarangereliin Khürelbaatar (MGL)
