= Bouza (surname) =

Bouza is a surname. Notable people with the surname include:

- Herminia Bouza (born 1965), Cuban javelin thrower
- José Luis Bouza, Spanish sprint canoer
- Libertad Lamarque Bouza (1908–2000), Argentine actress and singer
- Matt Bouza (born 1958), American football player
- Pablo Bouza (born 1973), Argentine rugby union coach and former player
- Tony Bouza (1928–2023), Spanish-American police officer
- Willan Bouza (born 1961), Uruguayan judoka

== See also ==
- Bouzas
