= Istvan Szasz =

Hungarian judoka (born 1976)

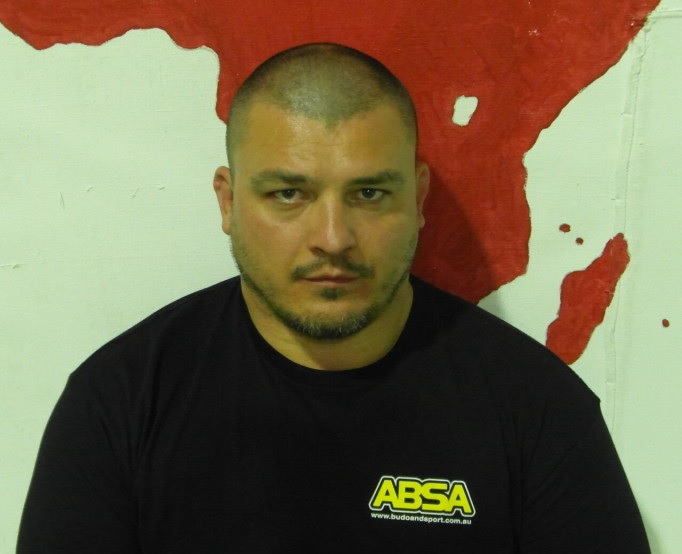
- Szasz in 2013

Personal information
- Full name: Istvan Szasz
- Nationality: Hungarian
- Born: 6 February 1976 (age 50) Oradea, Romania
- Website: www.budoandsport.com.au

Sport
- Country: Hungary
- Sport: Judo
- Club: Rapid Judo Club(Oradea), Kecskeméti Judo Club, Budapesti Honvéd Sportegyesület (BHSE) Judo club, Központi Sportiskola (KSI), Australian Budo and Sports Academy
Medal record
Junior World Judo Championships
Silver medal – second place	1994 Cairo	-95 kg
Junior European Cup/Championship
Silver medal – second place	1991 Hungary	-95 kg
Bronze medal – third place	1992 Hungary	-95 kg
Gold medal – first place	1992 France	-95 kg
Silver medal – second place	1992 Austria	-95 kg
Bronze medal – third place	1996 Monaco	-95 kg
European Judo Cup/Championships
Gold medal – first place	1993 Hungary	-95 kg
Gold medal – first place	2003 Italy	-100 kg
World Cup
Silver medal – second place	1996 Germany	-95 kg
Bronze medal – third place	1997 Hungary	-95 kg
National Championships
Romanian National Championships(Junior)
Bronze medal – third place	1987	U13
Gold medal – first place	1988	U13
Hungarian National Championships(Junior)
Silver medal – second place	1989	U14
Gold medal – first place	1990	U16
Gold medal – first place	1990	U16
Gold medal – first place	1991	U16
Gold medal – first place	1991	-95 kg
Gold medal – first place	1992	-95 kg
Gold medal – first place	1993	-95 kg
Gold medal – first place	1994	-95 kg
Gold medal – first place	1995	-95 kg
Hungarian National Team Championships(Junior)
Bronze medal – third place	1989	U14
Bronze medal – third place	1990	U16
Silver medal – second place	1991	U16
Bronze medal – third place	1991	-95 kg
Bronze medal – third place	1992	-95 kg
Gold medal – first place	1993	-95 kg
Gold medal – first place	1994	-95 kg
Gold medal – first place	1995	-95 kg
Hungarian National Championships
Bronze medal – third place	1992	-95 kg
Bronze medal – third place	1993	-95 kg
Bronze medal – third place	1995	-95 kg
Silver medal – second place	1996	-95 kg
Silver medal – second place	1997	-95 kg
Bronze medal – third place	1998	-100 kg
Bronze medal – third place	2002	-100 kg
Gold medal – first place	2005	-100 kg
Hungarian National Team Championships
Silver medal – second place	1993	-95 kg
Bronze medal – third place	1995	-95 kg
Gold medal – first place	1995	-95 kg
Gold medal – first place	1997	-95 kg
Gold medal – first place	1998	-100 kg
Gold medal – first place	1999	-100 kg
Gold medal – first place	2000	-100 kg
Gold medal – first place	2002	-100 kg
Silver medal – second place	2003	-95 kg
- Updated on 31 August 2013

Istvan Szasz is a Hungarian judoka, currently living in Sydney, Australia. He was an eight-time Senior Hungarian National Championship medalist and five-time Junior Hungarian National Championship winner, a member of the Hungarian National team from 1990 to 2003 and a member of the Hungarian Olympic team from 1994 to 1999. Szasz competed internationally as a professional judoka from 1991 to 2003.

== Early life ==
Szasz was born in 1976 in the town of Oradea, Romania. He started practicing judo at the age of six, attending the Rapid Judo Club in Oradea, under Coach Radu Sarac.

At the age of 12, his family moved from Romania to Hungary after which he trained at the Kecskeméti Judo Club. At the time, the head coach was prominent judoka Endre Kiss, European Championship bronze medalist and 5th ranked World Championship competitor. Notable students include Szasz' training partner Janos E. Kovacs, winner of three Hungarian National Championships and 5th place recipient in the 1985 World Championships in Seoul, Korea. The head coach later changed to Laszlo Horvath.

== Judo career ==
From 1987 to 1990, Szasz competed in Junior National Championships in Romania and Hungary. He placed 1st in the 1988 Romanian National Championship (U13) and in the 1990 Hungarian National Championship (U16). In 1991, he became a member of the Hungarian National Team and his participation in international tournaments began, competing in the Junior European Cups in Hungary (2nd place), France (5th place) and Austria. He also fought in the Senior European Cup in Italy, placing 2nd.

Szaszs' participation in international competition continued in 1992, placing in the Junior European Cups in Hungary (3rd), France (1st) and Austria (2nd). In 1993 he placed 5th at the 2nd European Youth Olympic games. It was also at this time he received an award from the city of Kecskeméti for Acknowledgement and Appreciation of Outstanding Sporting Activities for years 1991, 1992 and 1993.

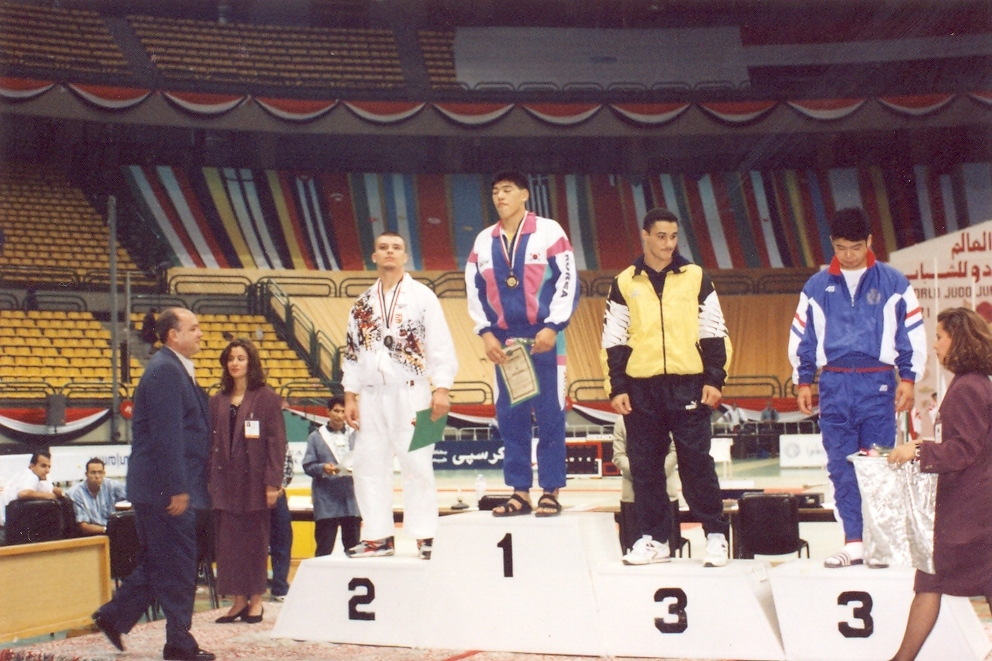
Istvan in second place (to Kim Min-soo) at the Junior World Championships in Cairo

In 1994, Szasz became a member of the Hungarian Olympic Team. He took 2nd place in the World Junior Championships in Cairo. He won fights against Alejandro Bender (Atlanta and Sydney Olympian from Argentina) and Antonio Felicite (Atlanta Olympian from Mauritius). He was defeated by Kim Min-soo (Korea) in the final, who later went on to win an Olympic silver medal and become a K-1 and MMA fighter. After placing second in the World Junior Championships Szasz moved to Budapesti Honvéd Sportegyesület (BHSE) Judo club in 1995, led by renowned coach Ferencz Moravetz. Other coaches included András Ozsvár - Olympic bronze medalist, two time World Championship bronze medalist and European Championship double bronze and silver medalist. Notable students at this club include Olympic Silver medalist Bertalan Hajtós. Szasz continued to compete nationally and internationally. He fought in the European Junior Championship in Monaco (1996) and placed 3rd, defeating Sergio Santana, Josef Eder and three time Polish National Champion Pawel Sitarsky. First place went to Guillaume Coatleven with second place to Olympic Silver medalist, 14 time World Cup winner and 9 time Russian National Champion Alexander Mikhaylin.

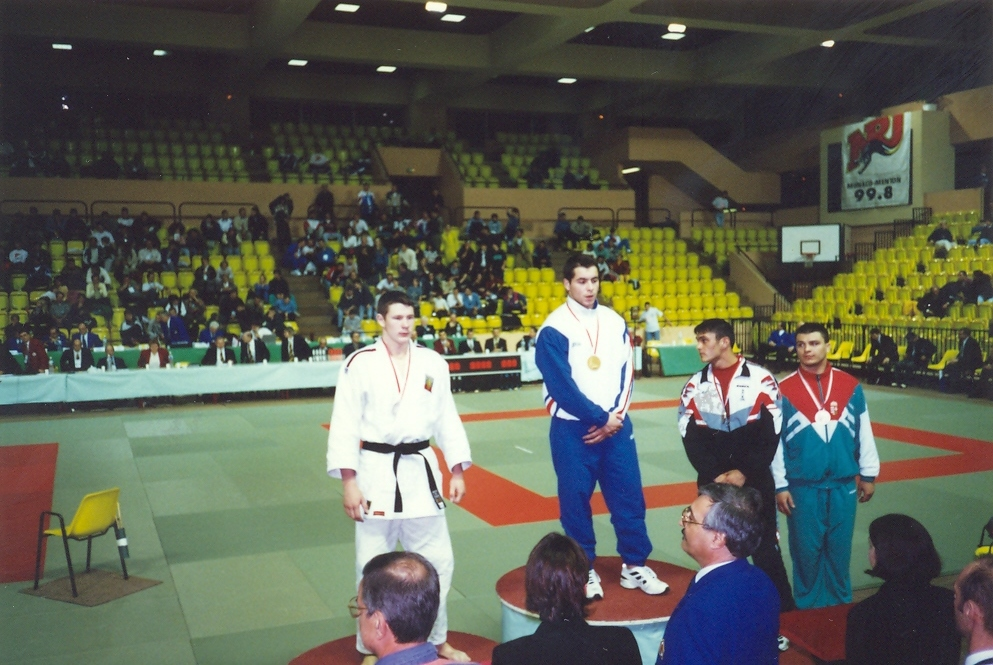
Istvan at the European Championships in 1996 with Alexander Mikhaylin

Szasz placed 2nd in the Senior World Cup in Germany (Internationale Deutsche Meisterschaft 1996), beating Barcelona Olympian and World Championship bronze medallist Axel Lobenstein. He also came 7th in the World University Championship in Canada.

In 1997 Szasz competed at the World Championship in France, and the Military World Championship in Croatia. Notable fights during this year include winning against four time World Cup medalist Martin Van Den Berg (Nederlands) at the Czech Cup in Prague.

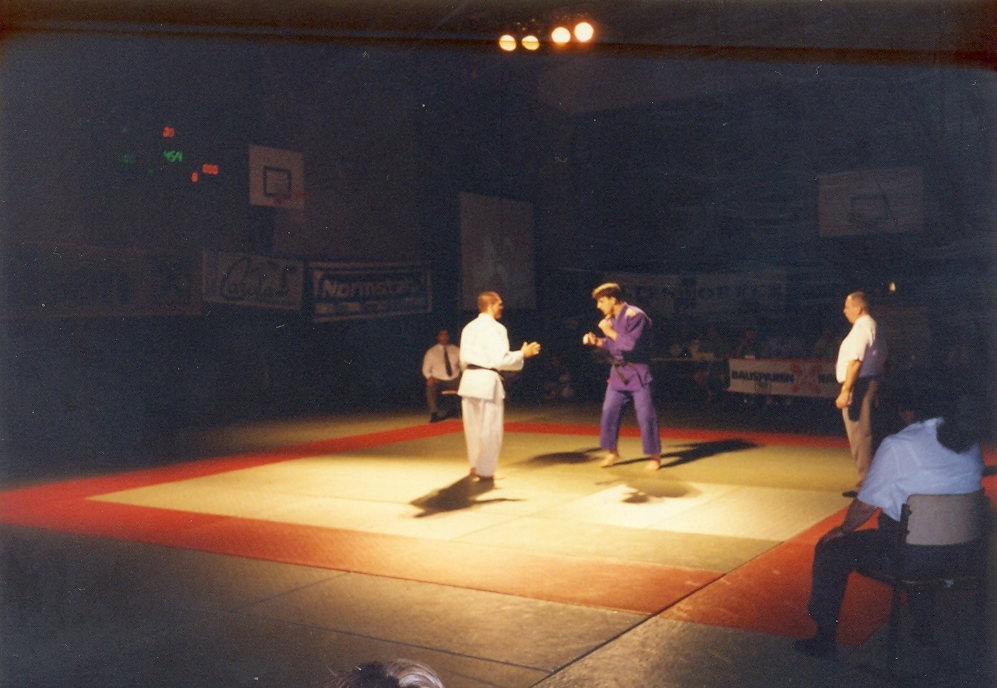
Istvan fighting Pawel Nastula

In the same year he fought two time Olympic bronze medalist Stephane Traineau (France) in the Paris World Cup, and Gold medal Olympian, two time World Championship winner, thirteen time Polish National Champion and former Pride FC MMA fighter Pawel Nastula in the 1997 Austrian Team championships.

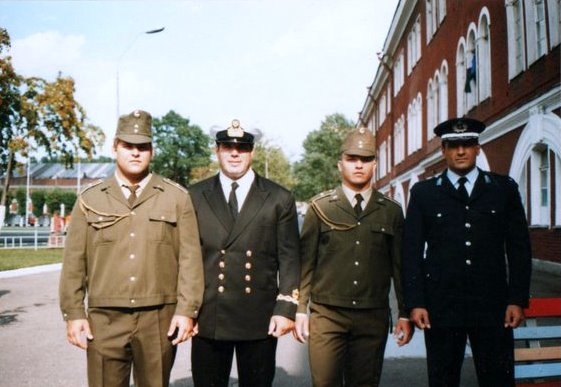
Istvan Szasz at the Military Championships in Russia - 1998

In 1999 Szasz moved to the Központi Sportiskola (KSI), club of prominent coach Pánczél Gabor, and 2012 London Olympic competitor Abigel Joo. He competed in the World Cup in Budapest, winning against Judo Olympian and former Strikeforce MMA fighter Rhadi Ferguson.

Istvans professional Judo career ended in 2003, where he competed in the Putin Cup in Russia, and the Senior European cup in Italy, placing 3rd.

== Education ==
From 1996 – 2000 Szasz studied Judo Coaching at Semmelweis University in Hungary, in parallel with competitive international tournament participation. From 2004 to 2006, he studied a masters in physical education.

== Post-fighting career ==
From 2003 to 2007, Szasz took up a position with the Hungarian Police, working as a consultant and physical fitness trainer. He also organised many of the police sporting championships, as well as winning the Hungarian National Police Championship Judo competitions from 2005 to 2007.

== Coaching in Australia ==
In 2008, Szasz moved to Australia and started competing in tournaments. He won the NSW Judo open, Sydney International Open, and came third in the ACT international Open in 2010. At this time he started coaching the University of Sydney Judo team. In 2011, Istvan and his wife Margrethe (national judo referee) started their own Flagship club – Australian Budo and Sports Academy in Belmore, Sydney – training Judo, Brazilian Jiu-Jitsu, Mixed Martial Arts and Self-Defence. He also coaches at Evolution GYM in Castle Hill, Sydney and Gracie Brazilian Jiu-Jitsu club Sydney.
