= Arturo Gutiérrez =

Arturo Gutiérrez may refer to:

- Arturo Gutiérrez Reveco (born 1931), Chilean politician
- Arturo Gutiérrez (judoka) (born 1973), Mexican judoka
