= Theo Meijer (judoka) =

Dutch judoka (born 1965)

Personal information
- Born: 18 February 1965 (age 61)
- Occupation: Judoka

Sport
- Country: Netherlands
- Sport: Judo
- Weight class: ‍–‍95 kg

Achievements and titles
- Olympic Games: (bronze) (1992)
- World Champ.: (silver) (1987)
- European Champ.: (gold) (1991)
Medal record
Men's judo
Representing the Netherlands
Olympic Games
Bronze medal – third place	1992 Barcelona	‍–‍95 kg
World Championships
Silver medal – second place	1987 Essen	‍–‍95 kg
European Championships
Gold medal – first place	1991 Prague	‍–‍95 kg
Bronze medal – third place	1989 Helsinki	‍–‍95 kg
World Juniors Championships
Bronze medal – third place	1983 Mayaguez	‍–‍86 kg
European Junior Championships
Gold medal – first place	1985 Delemont	‍–‍95 kg
Silver medal – second place	1984 Cadiz	‍–‍95 kg
Bronze medal – third place	1982 Tirgoviste	‍–‍86 kg

Profile at external databases
- IJF: 1555
- JudoInside.com: 1527
- Updated on 5 June 2023

Theodorus ("Theo") Johannes Meijer (born 18 February 1965 in Amersfoort, Utrecht) is a retired judoka from the Netherlands, who represented his native country at two consecutive Summer Olympics (1988 and 1992). He won the bronze medal in the men's half-heavyweight division (‍–‍95 kg) in Barcelona, Spain (1992), alongside Dmitri Sergeyev who represented the Unified Team.
