= Daniel Gowing =

New Zealand judoka

Personal information
- Nationality: New Zealand
- Born: 18 May 1971; Auckland, New Zealand
- Died: March 2017; Auckland, New Zealand

Sport
- Sport: Judo

Daniel Gowing (18 May 1971 – March 2017) was a New Zealand judoka. He competed at the 1996 Summer Olympics and the 2000 Summer Olympics.

In the 2000 Summer Olympics, Gowing lost to eventual gold medalist Kosei Inoue in the second round of the 100kg competition, and subsequently lost to Yosvani Kessel in the repechage fight.
