= Islam Matsiev =

Russian judoka

Medal record

Men's judo

European Championships
Silver medal – second place	1998 Oviedo	66 kg
Bronze medal – third place	2002 Maribor	66 kg

Islam Matsiev (born 10 December 1973) is a Russian judoka. At the European Championships in judo, in May 2002 in Slovenia, the bronze medal was won by Matsiev, participating in the weight category 66 kg.

Matsiev has always stressed that he is not the first Chechen who has achieved great results in judo. Example to consider themselves to be Bashir Varaev, who is fourfold European Champion, three-time world championship medalist, bronze medalist of the Olympic Games in Seoul.

When Bashir Wara conquered the height of World Judo, Matsiev did only the first steps in the sport. He began studying judo at age 10, a student of the Class 4 rural school in Old Atagi. Post-secondary education has decided that the future life will be closely linked with the sport. Enrolled in the Chechen Pedagogical Institute, the department of physical education. Military service was held in Moscow - in the Central Army Sports Club (CSKA).

Demobilization took place at the time of the collapse of the Soviet Union. Matsiev, like several other of his young countrymen, succumbed to the persuasion of his coach, Chechens to leave for permanent residence in Turkey. There he continued playing sports. It seemed that everything went well. But Matsieve was drawn to his homeland - Russia. And he returned.

Arriving in Moscow, IA Matsiev went to CSKA Moscow. There he was not forgotten. Took command. Within a year he has successfully performed at various all-Russian competitions, and loudly announced himself. Head coach noticed his persistence and desire to be first. Matsiev included in the national team to participate in the team competition of European Championship. The championship was held in Turkey. Matsiev fought well. Won all the bouts and became European champion in the team competition. In the national IM Matsiev had been advocating for nearly a decade. And on the first cast. Matsiev conquered a lot of high-profile sporting titles. Became the repeated champion of Russia, silver and bronze medalist of European Championship. There have been ups and downs. The most insulting Matsiev considers disqualification at the Sydney Olympics. On the eve of the Olympic battles in world rankings, he was number one: during the qualifying stage scored 150 points, while his nearest rival was only 85. But at the Olympics, he missed the final. Left without a medal. Now Matsiev preparing for the 2004 Olympics in Athens.

Master Trainer II Matsiev has long been a Chevalier Nusuev. It is said Matsiev, their relationship went beyond that are usually between the coach and athlete, and became fraternal. That Sh Nusuev helped Matsiev to buy an apartment in Moscow. Now the coach and his pupil living in one house.

At the training camp coached by Abel I. Matsiev Kazachenko, boss and coach judo team CSKA. He says of the Chechen athletes: "In everyday life, Matsiev is by nature a quiet man, very accommodating. And during the competition, he shows fighting qualities: his struggles and conflicts have, and effervescent. I noticed that in team appearances he fights better than in personal duels: more collected, more mobilized. High sense of responsibility. The team called "the hewer.

Now CSKA Moscow in the judo section deals with many Chechen men. Many of them in the halls of the famous sports club brought Matsiev, which is already in the category of veterans in the sport - in the year of the Olympics in Athens he will be 30 years old.

== Achievements ==
Year	Tournament	Place	Weight class
2002	European Judo Championships	3rd	Half lightweight (66 kg)
2001	World Judo Championships	5th	Half lightweight (66 kg)
2000	European Judo Championships	7th	Half lightweight (66 kg)
1998	European Judo Championships	2nd	Half lightweight (66 kg)
1996	European Judo Championships	5th	Half lightweight (65 kg)
