= Bouzas =

Surname list

Bouzas is a surname. Notable people with the surname include:

- Dani Bouzas (born 1974), Spanish footballer
- Rómulo Bouzas (born 1978), Mexican rower
- Vasilios Bouzas (born 1993), Greek footballer
- Jéssica Bouzas Maneiro (born 2002), Spanish tennis player

== See also ==
- Bouza (surname)
