= Roman Jahoda =

Austrian judoka

Personal information
- Born: 24 July 1976 (age 49) Brno, Czech Republic
- Occupation: Judoka

Sport
- Sport: Judo
- Rank: 3rd dan black belt
- Club: Judoschule Sakura; Union Pinzgau (2002)

Profile at external databases
- IJF: 59155
- JudoInside.com: 504

Roman Jahoda (born 24 July 1976 in Brno, Czech Republic) is an Austrian judoka.

== Judo career ==
Roman was most successful in judo and was on the Austrian national judo team for 10 years. He won two judo world cups and four Austrian Judo Championships and was a contestant at World (1999) and European Judo Championships (1998).

== Achievements ==
Year	City	Tournament	Place	Weight class
2002	Sofia	World Cup	1	-81 kg
2002		Austrian Championships	1	-81 kg
2000		Austrian Championships	1	-81 kg
1999	Zagreb	Military World Games	2	-90 kg
1998	Budapest	World Cup	7	-90 kg
1998	Oviedo	European Championships	5	-90 kg
1998	Sofia	World Cup	1	-90 kg

== Personal life ==
Jahoda was raised in Czechoslovakia for 10 years before moving to Austria. His father, a member of the Czech Judo national team, was an engineer and taught mathematics and sports at university. His mother was a member of the Czech skiing national team and was an architect.

In 2003, Jahoda established himself as a physical therapist, working with professional athletes across a wide range of sports.
