= Yasuhiro Kai =

Japanese judoka (born 1968)

Personal information
- Nationality: Japanese
- Born: 30 April 1968 (age 58) Fukuoka, Japan

Sport
- Sport: Judo
Medal record
Men's judo
Representing Japan
Asian Games
Gold medal – first place	1990 Beijing	95 kg

Yasuhiro Kai (甲斐 康浩, Kai Yasuhiro; born 30 April 1968) is a Japanese judoka. He competed in the men's half-heavyweight event at the 1992 Summer Olympics.
