= Dmitry Solovyov (judoka) =

Uzbekistani judoka (born 1963)

Personal information
- Nationality: Uzbekistani
- Born: 28 December 1963 (age 62)

Sport
- Sport: Judo
Medal record
Men's judo
Representing Uzbekistan
Asian Games
Bronze medal – third place	1994 Hiroshima	73 kg

Dmitry Solovyov (born 28 December 1963) is an Uzbekistani judoka. He competed in the men's half-heavyweight event at the 1996 Summer Olympics.
