= 1998 European Judo Championships =

1998 Judo European Judo Championships
- Venue: Palacio Municipal de Deportes de Oviedo
- Location: Oviedo, Spain
- Dates: 16–17 May 1998

Competition at external databases
- Links: JudoInside

The 1998 European Judo Championships were the 9th edition of the European Judo Championships, and were held in Oviedo, Spain from 16 to 17 May 1998.

== Medal overview ==
=== Men ===
Event	Gold	Silver	Bronze
60 kg	(Georgia (country)) Nestor Khergiani	(Ukraine) Ruslan Mirzaliyev	(Spain) Óscar Peñas (Belarus) Rashad Mammadov
66 kg	(France) Larbi Benboudaoud	(Russia) Islam Matsiev	(Netherlands) Patrick van Kalken (Georgia (country)) Giorgi Revazishvili
73 kg	(Italy) Giuseppe Maddaloni	(Moldova) Andrei Golban	(Ukraine) Ilya Chimchiuri (Poland) Rafał Kozielewski
81 kg	(Hungary) Bertalan Hajtós	(Azerbaijan) Mehman Azizov	(Germany) Dirk Radszat (Turkey) Iraklı Uznadze
90 kg	(Netherlands) Mark Huizinga	(Germany) Marko Spittka	(France) Vincenzo Carabetta (Russia) Dmitri Morozov
100 kg	(Germany) Daniel Gürschner	(Romania) Radu Ivan	(Russia) Youri Stepkine (Netherlands) Ben Sonnemans
+100 kg	(Russia) Tamerlan Tmenov	(Poland) Rafał Kubacki	(Turkey) Selim Tataroğlu (Hungary) Imre Csösz
Open class	(Turkey) Selim Tataroğlu	(Belgium) Harry Van Barneveld	(Netherlands) Dennis van der Geest (Estonia) Indrek Pertelson

=== Women ===
Event	Gold	Silver	Bronze
48 kg	(France) Sarah Nichilo-Rosso	(Russia) Tatiana Kouvchinova	(Spain) Yolanda Soler (Poland) Jolanta Wojnarowicz
52 kg	(Germany) Raffaella Imbriani	(United Kingdom) Georgina Singleton	(France) Marie-Claire Restoux (Switzerland) Isabelle Schmutz
57 kg	(Spain) Isabel Fernández	(United Kingdom) Deborah Allan	(Netherlands) Deborah Gravenstijn (France) Magali Baton
63 kg	(Belgium) Gella Vandecaveye	(Spain) Sara Álvarez	(Czech Republic) Radka Štusáková (Netherlands) Nancy van Stokkum
70 kg	(Belgium) Ulla Werbrouck	(Netherlands) Karin Kienhuis	(United Kingdom) Kate Howey (Italy) Ylenia Scapin
78 kg	(Spain) Esther San Miguel	(France) Céline Lebrun	(Germany) Uta Kühnen (United Kingdom) Chloe Cowen
+78 kg	(United Kingdom) Karina Bryant	(Spain) Raquel Barrientos	(Germany) Sandra Köppen (France) Christine Cicot
Open class	(Netherlands) Françoise Harteveld	(Poland) Beata Maksymow	(Russia) Irina Rodina (Germany) Katja Gerber

=== Medals table ===
Rank	Nation	Gold	Silver	Bronze	Total
1	Spain	2	2	2	6
2	Netherlands	2	1	5	8
3	France	2	1	4	7
3	Germany	2	1	4	7
5	Belgium	2	1	0	3
6	Turkey	2	0	1	3
7	Russia	1	2	3	6
8	Great Britain	1	2	2	5
9	Netherlands	1	0	2	3
10	Georgia	1	0	1	2
10	Hungary	1	0	1	2
10	Italy	1	0	1	2
13	Poland	0	2	2	4
14	Ukraine	0	1	1	2
15	Azerbaijan	0	1	0	1
15	Moldova	0	1	0	1
15	Romania	0	1	0	1
18	Belarus	0	0	1	1
18	Czech Republic	0	0	1	1
18	Estonia	0	0	1	1
18	Switzerland	0	0	1	1

== Results overview ==
=== Men ===
==== 60 kg ====
Position	Judoka	Country
1.	Nestor Khergiani	Georgia
2.	Ruslan Mirzaliyev	Ukraine
3.	Óscar Peñas	Spain
3.	Rachad Mamedov	Belarus
5.	Oliver Gussenberg	Germany
5.	Nikolai Ojeguine	Russia
7.	Martijn van Oostrum	Netherlands
7.	Ulduz Sultanov	Azerbaijan

==== 66 kg ====
Position	Judoka	Country
1.	Larbi Benboudaoud	France
2.	Islam Matsiev	Russia
3.	Patrick van Kalken	Netherlands
3.	Giorgi Revazishvili	Georgia
5.	Martin Schmidt	Germany
5.	David Somerville	Great Britain
7.	Daniel Beldeanu	Romania
7.	József Csák	Hungary

==== 73 kg ====
Position	Judoka	Country
1.	Giuseppe Maddaloni	Italy
2.	Andrei Golban	Moldova
3.	Ilya Chimchiuri	Ukraine
3.	Rafał Kozielewski	Poland
5.	Vitali Makarov	Russia
5.	Csaba Gera	Hungary
7.	Jondo Muzashvili	Georgia
7.	Guilherme Bentes	Portugal

==== 81 kg ====
Position	Judoka	Country
1.	Bertalan Hajtós	Hungary
2.	Mehman Azizov	Azerbaijan
3.	Dirk Radszat	Germany
3.	Iraklı Uznadze	Turkey
5.	Maarten Arens	Netherlands
5.	Graeme Randall	Great Britain
7.	German Abdulaev	Russia
7.	Robert Krawczyk	Poland

==== 90 kg ====
Position	Judoka	Country
1.	Mark Huizinga	Netherlands
2.	Marko Spittka	Germany
3.	Vincenzo Carabetta	France
3.	Dmitri Morozov	Russia
5.	Daan De Cooman	Belgium
5.	Roman Jahoda	Austria
7.	Winston Gordon	Great Britain
7.	Fernando González	Spain

==== 100 kg ====
Position	Judoka	Country
1.	Daniel Gürschner	Germany
2.	Radu Ivan	Romania
3.	Youri Stepkine	Russia
3.	Ben Sonnemans	Netherlands
5.	Ghislain Lemaire	France
5.	Petr Jákl	Czech Republic
7.	Luigi Guido	Italy
7.	Timo Peltola	Finland

==== +100 kg ====
Position	Judoka	Country
1.	Tamerlan Tmenov	Russia
2.	Rafał Kubacki	Poland
3.	Selim Tataroğlu	Turkey
3.	Imre Csösz	Hungary
5.	Denny Ebbers	Netherlands
5.	Frank Möller	Germany
7.	Harry Van Barneveld	Belgium
7.	Alexandru Lungu	Romania

==== Open class ====
Position	Judoka	Country
1.	Selim Tataroğlu	Turkey
2.	Harry Van Barneveld	Belgium
3.	Dennis van der Geest	Netherlands
3.	Indrek Pertelson	Estonia
5.	Imre Csösz	Hungary
5.	Aythami Ruano	Spain
7.	Patrice Rognon	France
7.	Ramaz Chochosvili	Georgia

=== Women ===
==== 48 kg ====
Position	Judoka	Country
1.	Sarah Nichilo-Rosso	France
2.	Tatiana Kouvchinova	Russia
3.	Yolanda Soler	Spain
3.	Jolanta Wojnarowicz	Poland
5.	Laura Moise	Romania
5.	Maria Karagiannopoulou	Greece
7.	Ilse Heylen	Belgium
7.	Giorgina Zanette	Italy

==== 52 kg ====
Position	Judoka	Country
1.	Raffaella Imbriani	Germany
2.	Georgina Singleton	Great Britain
3.	Marie-Claire Restoux	France
3.	Isabelle Schmutz	Switzerland
5.	Tamara Meijer	Netherlands
5.	Ioana Maria Aluaș	Romania
7.	Inge Clement	Belgium
7.	Alena Karytskaya	Belarus

==== 57 kg ====
Position	Judoka	Country
1.	Isabel Fernández	Spain
2.	Deborah Allan	Great Britain
3.	Deborah Gravenstijn	Netherlands
3.	Magali Baton	France
5.	Zulfiyya Huseinova	Azerbaijan
5.	Lena Göldi	Switzerland
7.	Michaela Vernerová	Czech Republic
7.	Orit Bar-On	Israel

==== 63 kg ====
Position	Judoka	Country
1.	Gella Vandecaveye	Belgium
2.	Sara Álvarez	Spain
3.	Radka Štusáková	Czech Republic
3.	Nancy van Stokkum	Netherlands
5.	Jenny Gal	Italy
5.	Elena Petrova	Russia
7.	Eszter Csizmadia	Hungary
7.	Raša Sraka	Slovenia

==== 70 kg ====
Position	Judoka	Country
1.	Ulla Werbrouck	Belgium
2.	Karin Kienhuis	Netherlands
3.	Kate Howey	Great Britain
3.	Ylenia Scapin	Italy
5.	Carine Varlez	France
5.	Agata Mróz	Poland
7.	Tetyana Belajeva	Ukraine
7.	Úrsula Martín	Spain

==== 78 kg ====
Position	Judoka	Country
1.	Esther San Miguel	Spain
2.	Céline Lebrun	France
3.	Uta Kühnen	Germany
3.	Chloe Cowen	Great Britain
5.	Heidi Rakels	Belgium
5.	Izabela Lubczyńska	Poland
7.	Lucia Morico	Italy
7.	Svetlana Lysianskaya	Ukraine

==== +78 kg ====
Position	Judoka	Country
1.	Karina Bryant	Great Britain
2.	Raquel Barrientos	Spain
3.	Sandra Köppen	Germany
3.	Christine Cicot	France
5.	Françoise Harteveld	Netherlands
5.	Svetlana Goundarenko	Russia
7.	Brigitte Olivier	Belgium
7.	Olga Tarasova	Belarus

==== Open class ====
Position	Judoka	Country
1.	Françoise Harteveld	Netherlands
2.	Beata Maksymow	Poland
3.	Irina Rodina	Russia
3.	Katja Gerber	Germany
5.	Inmaculada Vicent	Spain
5.	Simone Callender	Great Britain
7.	Brigitte Olivier	Belgium
7.	Mara Kovačević	FR Yugoslavia
