= Aiman El-Shewy =

Egyptian judoka (born 1968)

Personal information
- Nationality: Egyptian
- Born: 3 February 1968 (age 57)

Sport
- Sport: Judo

Aiman El-Shewy (born 3 February 1968) is an Egyptian judoka. He competed in the men's half-heavyweight event at the 1992 Summer Olympics.
