= Yun Sang-sik =

South Korean judoka

Personal information
- Nationality: South Korean
- Born: 20 September 1968 (age 56)

Sport
- Sport: Judo

Yun Sang-sik (born 20 September 1968) is a South Korean judoka. He competed in the men's half-heavyweight event at the 1992 Summer Olympics.
