= Martijn van Oostrum =

Dutch judoka (born 1976)

Martijn van Oostrum (born 27 May 1976) is a Dutch judoka.

== Achievements ==
Year	Tournament	Place	Weight class
1998	European Judo Championships	7th	Extra lightweight (60 kg)

== See also ==
- European Judo Championships
- History of martial arts
- List of judo techniques
- List of judoka
- Martial arts timeline
