= Vadims Voinovs =

Latvian judoka (born 1965)

Personal information
- Nationality: Latvian
- Born: 3 April 1965 (age 60) Riga, Latvia

Sport
- Sport: Judo

Vadims Voinovs (born 3 April 1965) is a Latvian judoka. He competed in the men's half-heavyweight event at the 1992 Summer Olympics.
