= Vladas Burba =

Lithuanian judoka (born 1966)

Personal information
- Nationality: Lithuanian
- Born: 10 September 1966 (age 59)
- Occupation: Judoka

Sport
- Sport: Judo

Profile at external databases
- JudoInside.com: 3068

Vladas Burba (born 10 September 1966) is a Lithuanian judoka. He competed in the men's half-heavyweight event at the 1992 Summer Olympics.
