= Ruslan Mirzaliyev =

Ukrainian judoka (born 1977)

Personal information
- Born: 22 July 1977 (age 48)
- Occupation: Judoka

Sport
- Sport: Judo
Medal record
Men's Judo
Representing Ukraine
European Championships
Silver medal – second place	1998 Oviedo	60 kg

Profile at external databases
- JudoInside.com: 484

Ruslan Mirzaliyev (born 22 July 1977) is a judoka from Ukraine.

== Achievements ==
Year	Tournament	Place	Weight class
2001	European Judo Championships	7th	Extra lightweight (60 kg)
1998	European Judo Championships	2nd	Extra lightweight (60 kg)
