= Simon Magalashvili =

Israeli judoka (born 1968)

Personal information
- Native name: סימון מגלשווילי
- Born: 4 January 1968 (age 58)
- Occupation: Judoka

Sport
- Country: Israel
- Sport: Judo
- Weight class: ‍–‍95 kg

Achievements and titles
- Olympic Games: R32 (1992)
- World Champ.: 7th (1991)
- European Champ.: R32 (1992)

Profile at external databases
- IJF: 53586
- JudoInside.com: 5301
- Updated on 29 May 2024

Simon Magalashvili (Hebrew: סימון מגלשווילי; born 4 January 1968) is an Israeli Olympic judoka.

== Judo career ==
Magalashvili placed 7th in the 1991 World Championships in the men's 95 kg category.

Competing in judo for Israel at the 1992 Summer Olympics in Barcelona, Spain, in the men's 95 kg category, Magalashvili came in tied for 21st out of 34 competitors.
