= Yury Styopkin =

Russian judoka

Personal information
- Born: 15 October 1971 (age 54)
- Occupation: Judoka

Sport
- Country: Russia
- Sport: Judo
- Weight class: –100 kg

Achievements and titles
- Olympic Games: (bronze) (2000)
- World Champ.: 9th (2001)
- European Champ.: (gold) (2000)
Medal record
Men's judo
Representing Russia
Olympic Games
Bronze medal – third place	2000 Sydney	‍–‍100 kg
European Championships
Gold medal – first place	2000 Wrocław	‍–‍100 kg
Bronze medal – third place	1998 Oviedo	‍–‍100 kg
Summer Universiade
Gold medal – first place	1995 Fukuoka	‍–‍95 kg
Bronze medal – third place	1999 Palma de Mallorca	‍–‍100 kg

Profile at external databases
- IJF: 34785
- JudoInside.com: 604
- Updated on 31 May 2023

Yury Viktorovich Styopkin (Russian: Юрий Викторович Стёпкин; born 15 October 1971) is a Russian judoka.

== Achievements ==
Year	Tournament	Place	Weight class
2002	European Judo Championships	7th	Half heavyweight (100 kg)
2000	Olympic Games	3rd	Half heavyweight (100 kg)
2000	European Judo Championships	1st	Half heavyweight (100 kg)
1999	Universiade	3rd	Half heavyweight (100 kg)
1998	European Judo Championships	3rd	Half heavyweight (100 kg)
1995	Universiade	1st	Half heavyweight (95 kg)
