= Song Qitao =

Chinese judoka (born 1978)

Personal information
- Nationality: Chinese
- Born: 30 January 1978 (age 47)

Sport
- Sport: Judo

Song Qitao (born 30 January 1978) is a Chinese judoka. He competed in the men's half-heavyweight event at the 2000 Summer Olympics.
