= Jondo Muzashvili =

Georgian judoka

Personal information
- Nationality: Georgian
- Born: 23 October 1970 (age 54); Georgia

Sport
- Country: Georgia
- Sport: Judo
- Event: -73 kg

Jondo Muzashvili (Georgian: ჯონდო მუზაშვილი) (born 23 October 1970) is a Georgian judoka.

== Achievements ==
| Year | Tournament | Place | Weight class |
|---|---|---|---|
| 1998 | European Judo Championships | 7th | Lightweight (73 kg) |
