= Ilias Nikas =

Greek judoka

Personal information
- Nationality: Greek
- Born: 16 April 1964 (age 60); Athens, Greece

Sport
- Sport: Judo

Ilias Nikas (born 16 April 1964) is a Greek judoka. He competed in the men's half-heavyweight event at the 1992 Summer Olympics.
