= Vernharð Þorleifsson =

Icelandic judoka (born 1973)

Personal information
- Nationality: Icelandic
- Born: 1 August 1973 (age 51)

Sport
- Sport: Judo

Vernharð Þorleifsson (born 1 August 1973) is an Icelandic judoka. He competed in the men's half-heavyweight event at the 1996 Summer Olympics.
