= Leo White (judoka) =

American judoka

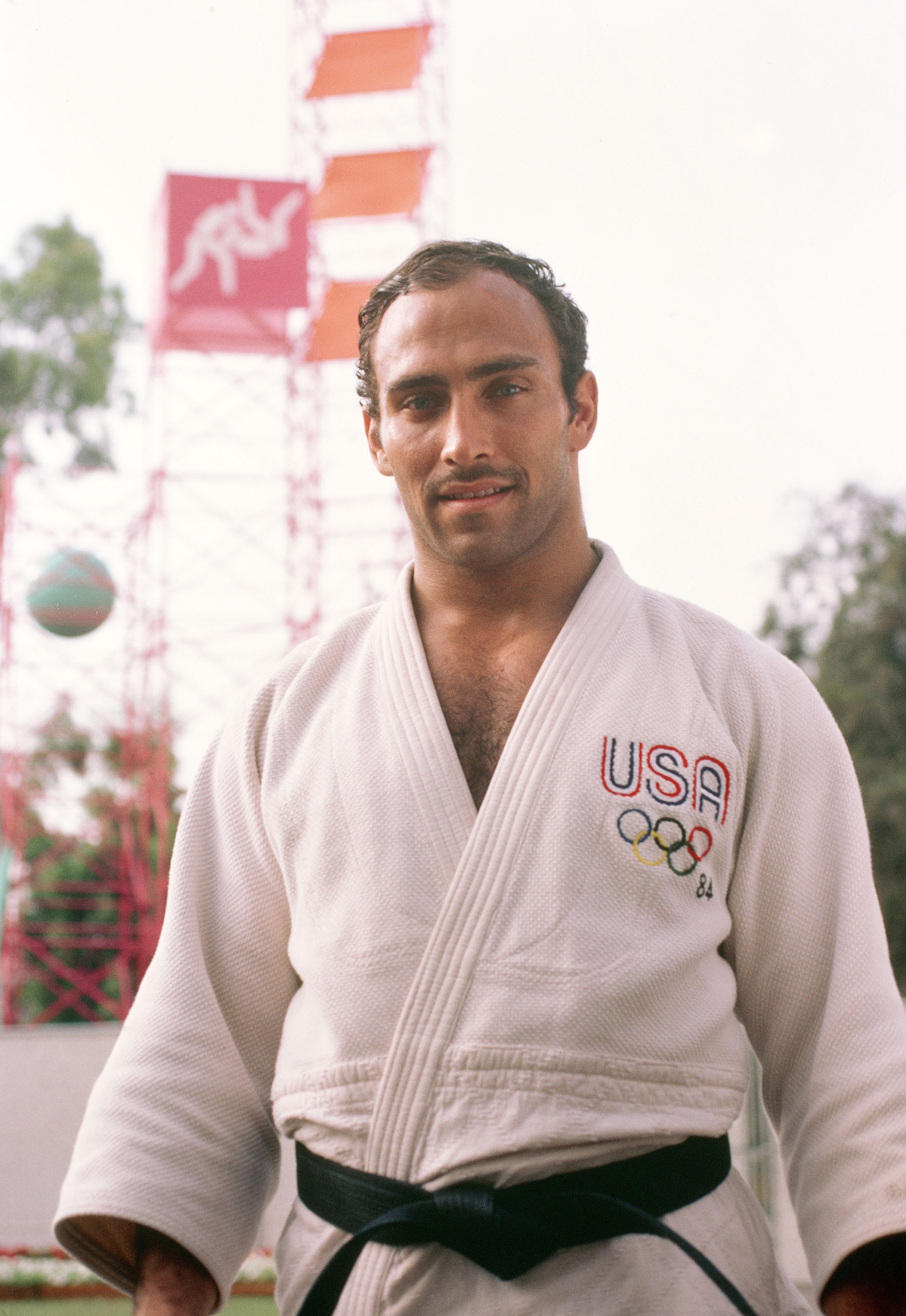
- White in 1984

Personal information
- Born: November 3, 1957 (age 68) Monterey, California
- Occupation: Judoka

Sport
- Sport: Judo
Medal record
Representing United States
Pan American Games
Silver medal – second place	1991 Havana	Half-heavyweight
Bronze medal – third place	1979 San Juan	Half-heavyweight
Bronze medal – third place	1983 Caracas	Half-heavyweight
Bronze medal – third place	1987 Indianapolis	Half-heavyweight

Profile at external databases
- JudoInside.com: 6024

Leonard White Jr. (born November 3, 1957) is a former Army officer and two-time member of the US Olympic judo team. White is one of the winningest judoka in US history. White currently holds the rank of 8th-degree black belt in judo.

== Personal life ==
White was the son of a retired Army sergeant and attended Monterey Peninsula College. White attended ROTC and graduated from Cumberland College in 1980. In 1984, he competed in the Olympics as a captain in the Army. White along with Bob Byrd implemented a judo program in Atlanta as an option outside of serving time for minor criminal offenses. White has been described as a gentleman and outstanding competitor. He married judo competitor Jackie White in 1993 and is currently the coach at Wakamusha Judo Club.

== Judo ==
White started judo at the age of ten in Monterey, California, at the Monterey Judo, Jujitsu Academy and was instructed by sensei Bernard Baptista. At age 18 he won the 1976 United States Judo Federation Young Men's Championships. White won the collegiate championships in 1976 as well as the 1980 Pan Am's and AAU Nations. White won a silver in the 1981 CISM games. In 1982, White won two golds in the World Military Judo Championships. White was a member of the US team that won the Dutch Open in 1983. White became a 1983 Black Belt Magazine Hall of Fame Competitor of the Year. In 1983, White beat out Brewster Thompson for a berth at the 1984 Olympics. White was on the 1984 US Olympic Team as well as the 1992 US Olympic Team.
