= Yosvani Kessel =

Cuban judoka (born 1977)

Personal information
- Nationality: Cuban
- Born: 24 February 1977 (age 49)

Sport
- Sport: Judo
Medal record
Representing Cuba
Pan American Games
Silver medal – second place	1999 Winnipeg	Half-heavyweight
Central American and Caribbean Games
Gold medal – first place	1998 Maracaibo	Half-heavyweight

Yosvani Kessel Goire (born 24 February 1977) is a Cuban judoka. He competed in the men's half-heavyweight event at the 2000 Summer Olympics.
