= Daniel Gürschner =

German judoka (born 1973)

Medal record

Men's judo

European Championships
Gold medal – first place	1998 Oviedo	100 kg
Silver medal – second place	2000 Wroclaw	100 kg

Daniel Gürschner (born February 27, 1973) is a German judoka.

== Achievements ==
Year	Tournament	Place	Weight class
2003	European Judo Championships	5th	Half heavyweight (100 kg)
2001	European Judo Championships	5th	Half heavyweight (100 kg)
2000	European Judo Championships	2nd	Half heavyweight (100 kg)
1999	European Judo Championships	5th	Half heavyweight (100 kg)
1998	European Judo Championships	1st	Half heavyweight (100 kg)
1997	World Judo Championships	5th	Half heavyweight (95 kg)
