= Antonio Felicité =

Mauritian judoka (born 1974)

Personal information
- Nationality: Mauritian
- Born: 25 July 1974 (age 50)

Sport
- Sport: Judo

Antonio Felicité (born 25 July 1974) is a Mauritian judoka. He competed in the men's half-heavyweight event at the 1996 Summer Olympics.
