= Kōsei Inoue =

Japanese judoka (born 1978)

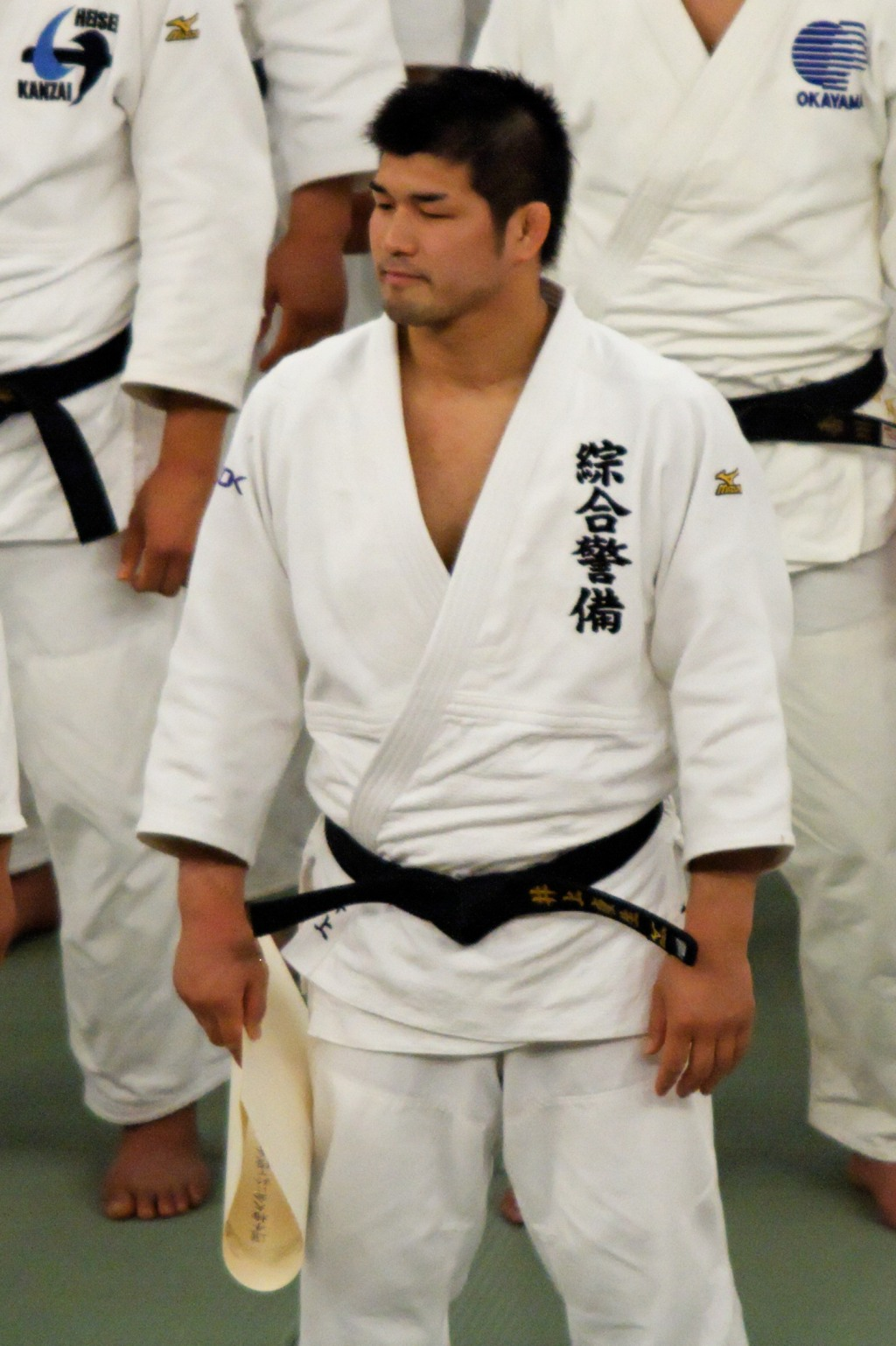

Personal information
- Born: 15 May 1978 (age 48) Miyazaki, Japan
- Home town: Tokyo, Japan
- Education: Tokai University
- Occupation: Judoka
- Height: 183 cm (6 ft 0 in)
- Spouse: Aki Higashihara (m. 2008)

Sport
- Country: Japan
- Sport: Judo
- Weight class: –100 kg
- Rank: 7th dan black belt
- Club: Sohgo Security (ALSOK)
- Now coaching: All Japan National Team (Head); Mashu Baker, Daiki Nishiyama, Yuya Yoshida, Ryunosuke Haga, Ryu Shichinohe

Achievements and titles
- Olympic Games: (gold) (2000)
- World Champ.: (gold) (1999, 2001, 2003)
- Asian Champ.: (gold) (1998, 2002)
Medal record
Men's judo
Representing Japan
Olympic Games
Gold medal – first place	2000 Sydney	‍–‍100 kg
World Championships
Gold medal – first place	1999 Birmingham	‍–‍100 kg
Gold medal – first place	2001 Munich	‍–‍100 kg
Gold medal – first place	2003 Osaka	‍–‍100 kg
Asian Games
Gold medal – first place	1998 Bangkok	‍–‍100 kg
Gold medal – first place	2002 Busan	Open

Profile at external databases
- IJF: 191
- JudoInside.com: 1003
- Updated on 31 May 2023

Kosei Inoue (井上 康生, Inoue Kōsei; born 15 May 1978) is a Japanese judoka. He won the gold medal in the under 100 kg class at the 2000 Summer Olympics. He is well known for his specialty throws, Uchi Mata (内股, inner thigh throw) and Ōuchi gari (大内刈, major inner reap).

He is considered by the Judo community as one of the best competitive judoka. His notable accomplishments include three golds at the World Championships and All Japan Championships (one of four Judokas who have accomplished this).

His older brother, Tomokazu Inoue is also judoka and former Asian champion.

He is affiliated with Sohgo Security Services (Alsok), a security firm.

== Biography ==
Kosei Inoue won the gold medal at the 2000 Sydney Olympics in the -100 kg division, most notably doing so by winning every single match by ippon. At the victory ceremony, he carried a photograph of his recently deceased mother onto the podium.

At the 2004 Athens Olympics, Kosei Inoue was chosen as the captain of the Japanese team. He was highly favored to win another gold in the u100 kg division. However, he suffered a major upset and did not place. Elco van der Geest of the Netherlands (2002 European Champion) defeated Inoue at the last minute with a drop seoi nage (shoulder throw) in the quarter final. Movlud Miraliyev of Azerbaijan countered Inoue's o-uchi gari with a ura nage to win the match during Repechage Round 3.

In 2005 he won the gold at the Jigoro Kano Cup, which is an A level contest with many former world and Olympic medalists.

He did not compete until 2007 because of a shoulder injury in 2005 and returned at +100 kg

At the 2008 All-Japan Judo Championships, Inoue lost to Yohei Takai by ippon, which ended his hopes of joining the Olympic team headed for Beijing. He promptly announced his retirement from international competition. Inoue was replaced by Satoshi Ishii, who defeated Keiji Suzuki in the final bout of the 2008 AJJC (International Herald Tribune, April 29, 2008) and won a gold medal in the 2008 Olympic Games.

== Personal life ==
Inoue married Japanese actress and television personality Aki Higashihara on January 14, 2008. After announcing his retirement from competitive judo, Inoue was selected by the Japan Olympic Committee to travel to the UK in order to learn English. After living in Edinburgh, Scotland (and training with the Scottish-based GB team members) for 6 months he moved to London to teach at the Budokwai for 12 months before returning to Japan as the Men's Heavyweight coach for the National team. Following Japan's least successful Olympics for Judo at the London 2012 Olympic Games, it was announced that Inoue would succeed Shinichi Shinohara as the new head coach of the national team.

Inoue was succeeded as head coach by Keiji Suzuki in 2021.

== Achievements ==
Year	Date	Tournament	Place	Weight class
1995	12.22	Kodokan Cup	loss	Heavyweight (+95 kg)
1996	4.29	All-Japan Championships	Round of 32	-
1996	12.22	Kodokan Cup	5th	Heavyweight (+95 kg)
1997	2.16	Wien World Cup	1st	Heavyweight (+95 kg)
1997	4.6	All-Japan Weight Class Championships	3rd	Heavyweight (+95 kg)
1997	4.29	All-Japan Championships	Round of 8	-
1997	12.6	Kodokan Cup	1st	Half-Heavyweight (-100 kg)
1998	2.7	Paris Super World Cup	2nd	Half-Heavyweight (-100 kg)
1998	4.5	All-Japan Weight Class Championships	2nd	Half-Heavyweight (-100 kg)
1998	4.29	All-Japan Championships	2nd	-
1998	12.10	Asian Games	1st	Half-Heavyweight (-100 kg)
1999	1.10	Jigoro Kano Cup	3rd	Half-Heavyweight (-100 kg)
1999	3.1	Hamburg Super World Cup	1st	Half-Heavyweight (-100 kg)
1999	3.7	Budapest World Cup	3rd	Half-Heavyweight (-100 kg)
1999	4.4	All-Japan Weight Class Championships	3rd	Half-Heavyweight (-100 kg)
1999	4.29	All-Japan Championships	Round of 8	-
1999	10.7	World Championships	1st	Half-Heavyweight (-100 kg)
2000	2.13	Paris Super World Cup	1st	Half-Heavyweight (-100 kg)
2000	4.2	All-Japan Weight Class Championships	1st	Half-Heavyweight (-100 kg)
2000	4.29	All-Japan Championships	2nd	-
2000	9.21	Olympic Games	1st	Half-Heavyweight (-100 kg)
2001	3.3	Budapest World Cup	1st	Half-Heavyweight (-100 kg)
2001	4.1	All-Japan Weight Class Championships	1st	Half-Heavyweight (-100 kg)
2001	4.29	All-Japan Championships	1st	-
2001	7.28	World Championships	1st	Half-Heavyweight (-100 kg)
2002	10.3	Asian Games	1st	Half-Heavyweight (-100 kg)
2002	4.29	All-Japan Championships	1st	-
2003	2.23	Hamburg Super World Cup	1st	Half-Heavyweight (-100 kg)
2003	4.6	All-Japan Weight Class Championships	2nd	Half-Heavyweight (-100 kg)
2003	4.29	All-Japan Championships	1st	-
2003	9.11	World Championships	1st	Half-Heavyweight (-100 kg)
2004	4.4	All-Japan Weight Class Championships	1st	Half-Heavyweight (-100 kg)
2004	4.29	All-Japan Championships	2nd	-
2004	8.19	Olympic Games	Round of 8	Half-Heavyweight (-100 kg)
2005	1.9	Jigoro Kano Cup	1st	Openweight
2006	11.19	Kodokan Cup	1st	Heavyweight (+100 kg)
2007	2.11	Paris Super World Cup	1st	Heavyweight (+100 kg)
2007	4.8	All-Japan Weight Class Championships	3rd	Heavyweight (+100 kg)
2007	4.29	All-Japan Championships	3rd	-
2007	9.14	World Championships	5th	Heavyweight (+100 kg)
2007	12.9	Jigoro Kano Cup	2nd	Heavyweight (+100 kg)
2008	2.11	Paris Super World Cup	5th	Heavyweight (+100 kg)
2008	4.6	All-Japan Weight Class Championships	1st	Heavyweight (+100 kg)
2008	4.29	All-Japan Championships	Round of 8	-

Olympic Games
Preceded by Ryoko Tamura	Flagbearer for Japan; 2000 Sydney	Succeeded by Kyoko Hamaguchi
