= Arturo Gutiérrez (judoka) =

Mexican judoka

Personal information
- Nationality: Mexican
- Born: 3 May 1973 (age 52)

Sport
- Sport: Judo

Arturo Gutiérrez (born 3 May 1973) is a Mexican judoka. He competed in the men's half-heavyweight event at the 1996 Summer Olympics.
