= Belarmino Salgado =

Cuban judoka (born 1966)

Personal information
- Full name: Belarmino Salgado Martínez
- Born: September 27, 1966 (age 59)
Medal record
Men's Judo
Representing Cuba
Pan American Games
| Gold medal – first place | 1991 Havana | Light Heavyweight |
| Bronze medal – third place | 1987 Indianapolis | Light Heavyweight |
| Bronze medal – third place | 1995 Mar del Plata | Light Heavyweight |

Belarmino Salgado Martínez (born September 27, 1966) is a retired male judoka from Cuba. He competed for his native country at the 1992 Summer Olympics in the Men's Half-Heavyweight (– 95 kg) division, and won a total number of three medals during his career at the Pan American Games (1987, 1991 and 1995).
