= Jorge Aguirre (judoka) =

Argentinian Olympic judoka (1962–2025)

Personal information
- Born: 2 January 1962
- Died: 10 February 2025 (aged 63)

Sport
- Sport: Judo
Medal record
Representing Argentina
Pan American Games
Bronze medal – third place	1991 Havana	-95 kg

Jorge David Aguirre Wardi (2 January 1962 – 10 February 2025) was an Argentine heavyweight judoka. Between 1980 and 1994 he won six medals at the Pan American Judo Championships, including a gold medal in 1994. He also won a bronze medal at the 1991 Pan American Games and competed at the 1992 Summer Olympics.

Aguirre died on 10 February 2025, at the age of 63, having suffered a heart attack.
