= Odvogiin Baljinnyam =

Mongolian judoka (born 1960)

Personal information
- Nationality: Mongolian
- Born: 10 May 1960 (age 66)

Sport
- Sport: Judo, Sambo
Medal record
Men's Judo
Representing Mongolia
World Championships
Silver medal – second place	1989 Belgrade	-95 kg
Asian Championships
Bronze medal – third place	1991 Osaka	–95 kg
Friendship Games
Bronze medal – third place	1984 Moscow	Middleweight 86 kg
Men's Sambo
Representing Mongolia
World Sambo Championships
Gold medal – first place	1986 Paris	1986 World Sambo Championships -90kg

Odvogiin Baljinnyam (born 10 May 1960) is a Mongolian jacket wrestler whose won as judoka and sambist. He competed at the 1988 Summer Olympics and the 1992 Summer Olympics.
