= Mevlud Lobzhanidze =

Georgian judoka (born 1968)

Mevlud Lobzhanidze (Georgian: მევლუდ ლობჟანიძე; born 2 November 1968 in Tbilisi) is a Georgian judoka.

== Achievements ==
Year	Tournament	Place	Weight class
1996	European Judo Championships	7th	Half heavyweight (95 kg)
