= Ato Hand =

American judoka (born 1975)

Personal information
- Born: June 30, 1975 (age 50) Tallahassee, Florida, United States

Sport
- Sport: Judo
Medal record
Representing United States
Pan American Games
Bronze medal – third place	1999 Winnipeg	Half-heavyweight

Ato Yero Hand (born June 30, 1975) is a former American judoka who competed in the 2000 Summer Olympics.
