= Alejandro Bender =

Argentine judoka

Personal information
- Born: 21 April 1976 (age 49); Quilmes, Buenos Aires, Argentina

Sport
- Sport: Judo

Alejandro Bender (born 21 April 1976) is an Argentine judoka. He competed at the 1996 Summer Olympics and the 2000 Summer Olympics.
