= Jambalyn Ganbold =

Mongolian judoka (born 1959)

Personal information
- Nationality: Mongolian
- Born: 6 September 1959 (age 66) Öndörkhangai sum, Mongolia

Sport
- Sport: Judo

Jambalyn Ganbold (born 6 September 1959) is a Mongolian judoka. He competed at the 1988 Summer Olympics and the 1992 Summer Olympics.
