= Willan Bouza =

Uruguayan amateur wrestler

Personal information
- Nationality: Uruguayan
- Born: 23 August 1961 (age 65)

Sport
- Sport: Judo

Willan Bouza (born 23 August 1961) is a Uruguayan judoka. He competed in the men's half-heavyweight event at the 1996 Summer Olympics.
