= Vadim Sergeyev =

Kyrgyzstani judoka (born 1965)

Personal information
- Nationality: Kyrgyzstani
- Born: 5 April 1965 (age 61)

Sport
- Sport: Judo

Vadim Yuryevich Sergeyev (Russian: Вадим Юрьевич Сергеев; born 5 April 1965) is a Kyrgyzstani former judoka. He competed at the 1996 Summer Olympics and the 2000 Summer Olympics.
