= Luigi Guido =

Italian judoka (born 1968)

Medal record

Men's judo

European Championships
Bronze medal – third place	1992 Paris	95 kg

Luigi Guido (born 5 March 1968) is an Italian judoka.

He represented Italy at the 1992 Summer Olympics in Barcelona, at the age of 24, in Judo—Men's Half-Heavyweight, and came in tied for 17th.

He represented Italy at the 1996 Summer Olympics in Atlanta in Judo—Men's Half-Heavyweight, at the age of 28, and came in tied for 13th.

He represented Italy at the 2000 Summer Olympics in Sydney in Judo—Men's Half-Heavyweight, and came in tied for 5th.

== Achievements ==
Year	Tournament	Place	Weight class
2000	Olympic Games	5th	Half heavyweight (100 kg)
2000	European Judo Championships	5th	Half heavyweight (100 kg)
1999	European Judo Championships	7th	Half heavyweight (100 kg)
1998	European Judo Championships	7th	Half heavyweight (100 kg)
1997	European Judo Championships	7th	Half heavyweight (95 kg)
1997	Mediterranean Games	1st	Half heavyweight (95 kg)
1993	European Judo Championships	5th	Half heavyweight (95 kg)
1992	European Judo Championships	3rd	Half heavyweight (95 kg)
