= Radu Ivan =

Romanian judoka

Personal information
- Born: 17 July 1969 (age 56)
- Occupation: Judoka

Sport
- Sport: Judo
Medal record
Representing Romania
Men's judo
European Championships
Silver medal – second place	1998 Oviedo	100 kg
Bronze medal – third place	1997 Ostend	95 kg

Profile at external databases
- JudoInside.com: 550

Radu Ivan (born 17 July 1969) is a Romanian judoka who competed at three Olympic Games.

== Achievements ==
Year	Tournament	Place	Weight class
2001	European Judo Championships	7th	Half heavyweight (100 kg)
1998	European Judo Championships	2nd	Half heavyweight (100 kg)
1997	World Judo Championships	5th	Half heavyweight (95 kg)
1997	European Judo Championships	3rd	Half heavyweight (95 kg)
1990	European Judo Championships	5th	Half heavyweight (95 kg)
