= Ben Sonnemans =

Dutch judoka (born 1972)

Personal information
- Born: 13 January 1972 (age 54)
- Occupation: Judoka

Sport
- Sport: Judo
Medal record
Men's judo
European Championships
Gold medal – first place	1997 Ostend	100 kg
Bronze medal – third place	1995 Birmingham	Open
Bronze medal – third place	1998 Oviedo	100 kg

Profile at external databases
- JudoInside.com: 1163

Ben Sonnemans (born 13 January 1972, Haarlem) is a Dutch judoka.

== Achievements ==
Year	Tournament	Place	Weight class
1998	European Judo Championships	3rd	Half heavyweight (100 kg)
1997	European Judo Championships	1st	Half heavyweight (95 kg)
1996	Olympic Games	5th	Half heavyweight (95 kg)
1996	European Judo Championships	7th	Half heavyweight (95 kg)
1995	World Judo Championships	7th	Half heavyweight (95 kg)
1995	European Judo Championships	3rd	Open class
1994	European Judo Championships	5th	Half heavyweight (95 kg)
1993	World Judo Championships	7th	Half heavyweight (95 kg)
