= Dmitri Sergeyev (judoka) =

Russian judoka (born 1968)

Personal information
- Born: 22 December 1968 (age 57)
- Occupation: Judoka

Sport
- Country: Russia
- Sport: Judo
- Weight class: ‍–‍95 kg

Achievements and titles
- Olympic Games: (bronze) (1992)
- World Champ.: (silver) (1995)
- European Champ.: (silver) (1992, 1995)
Medal record
Men's judo
Representing Unified Team
Olympic Games
Bronze medal – third place	1992 Barcelona	‍–‍95 kg
Representing Russia
World Championships
Silver medal – second place	1995 Chiba	‍–‍95 kg
European Championships
Silver medal – second place	1992 Paris	‍–‍95 kg
Silver medal – second place	1995 Birmingham	‍–‍95 kg
Bronze medal – third place	1994 Gdansk	‍–‍95 kg
Bronze medal – third place	1996 The Hague	‍–‍95 kg
Representing Soviet Union
European Junior Championships
Bronze medal – third place	1988 Vienna	‍–‍95 kg

Profile at external databases
- IJF: 3954
- JudoInside.com: 3381
- Updated on 5 June 2023

Dmitry Nikolayevich Sergeyev (Russian: Дмитрий Николаевич Сергеев; born 22 December 1968 in Perm, Soviet Union) is a Russian judoka.

== Achievements ==
Year	Tournament	Place	Weight class
1996	European Judo Championships	3rd	Half heavyweight (95 kg)
1995	World Judo Championships	2nd	Half heavyweight (95 kg)
1995	European Judo Championships	2nd	Half heavyweight (95 kg)
1994	European Judo Championships	3rd	Half heavyweight (95 kg)
1993	World Judo Championships	5th	Half heavyweight (95 kg)
1992	Olympic Games	3rd	Half heavyweight (95 kg)
1992	European Judo Championships	2nd	Half heavyweight (95 kg)
