= Paweł Nastula =

Polish judoka and mixed martial arts fighter

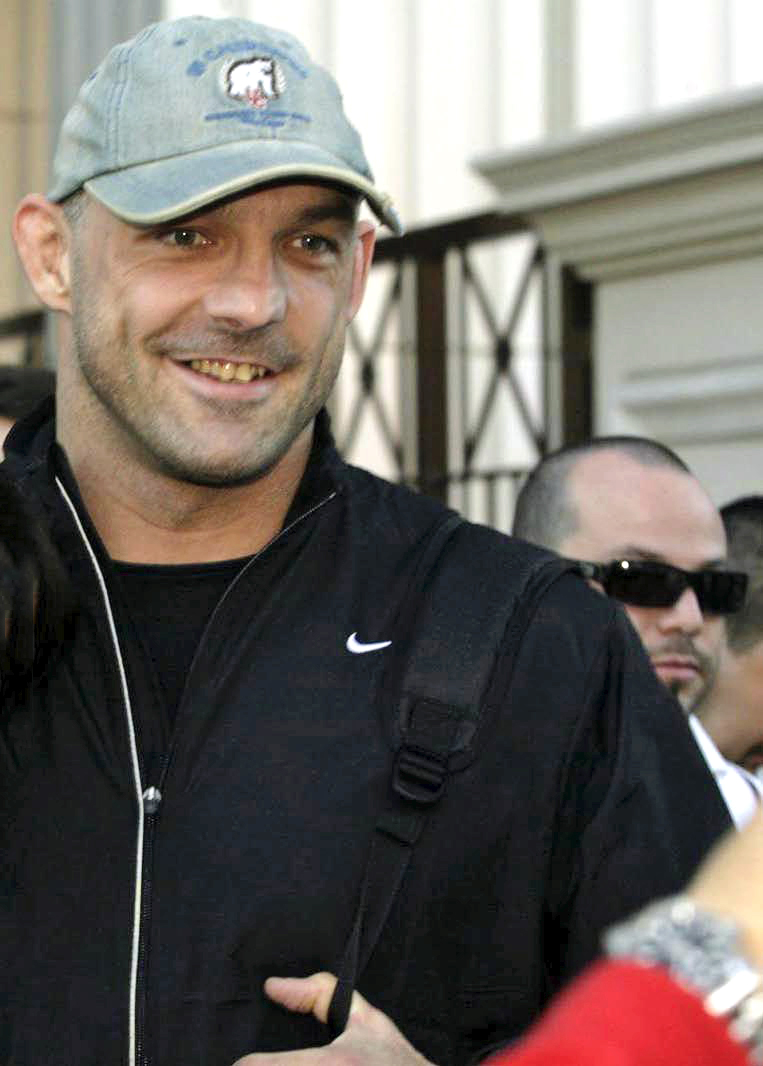
- Born: Paweł Nastula; 26 June 1970 (age 56); Warsaw, Poland
- Height: 1.85 m (6 ft 1 in)
- Weight: 241 lb (109 kg; 17 st 3 lb)
- Division: Heavyweight (265 lb)
- Style: MMA, Judo
- Stance: Southpaw
- Fighting out of: Warsaw, Poland
- Team: Nastula Team
- Years active: 2005–present (MMA)

Mixed martial arts record
- Total: 11
- Wins: 5
- By knockout: 3
- By submission: 2
- Losses: 6
- By knockout: 3
- By submission: 2
- By decision: 1

Other information
- Mixed martial arts record from Sherdog
- Judo career
- Weight class: ‍–‍95 kg, ‍–‍100 kg
- Rank: 6th dan black belt

Judo achievements and titles
- Olympic Games: (gold) (1996)
- World Champ.: (gold) (1995, 1997)
- European Champ.: (gold) (1994, 1995, 1996)
Medal record
Men's judo
Representing Poland
Olympic Games
Gold medal – first place	1996 Atlanta	‍–‍95 kg
World Championships
Gold medal – first place	1995 Chiba	‍–‍95 kg
Gold medal – first place	1997 Paris	‍–‍95 kg
Silver medal – second place	1991 Barcelona	‍–‍95 kg
European Championships
Gold medal – first place	1994 Gdansk	‍–‍95 kg
Gold medal – first place	1995 Birmingham	‍–‍95 kg
Gold medal – first place	1996 The Hague	‍–‍95 kg
Silver medal – second place	1999 Bratislava	‍–‍100 kg
European Junior Championships
Bronze medal – third place	1989 Athens	‍–‍86 kg
Bronze medal – third place	1990 Ankara	‍–‍86 kg

Profile at external judo databases
- IJF: 34754
- JudoInside.com: 1144
- Last updated on: 4 June 2023

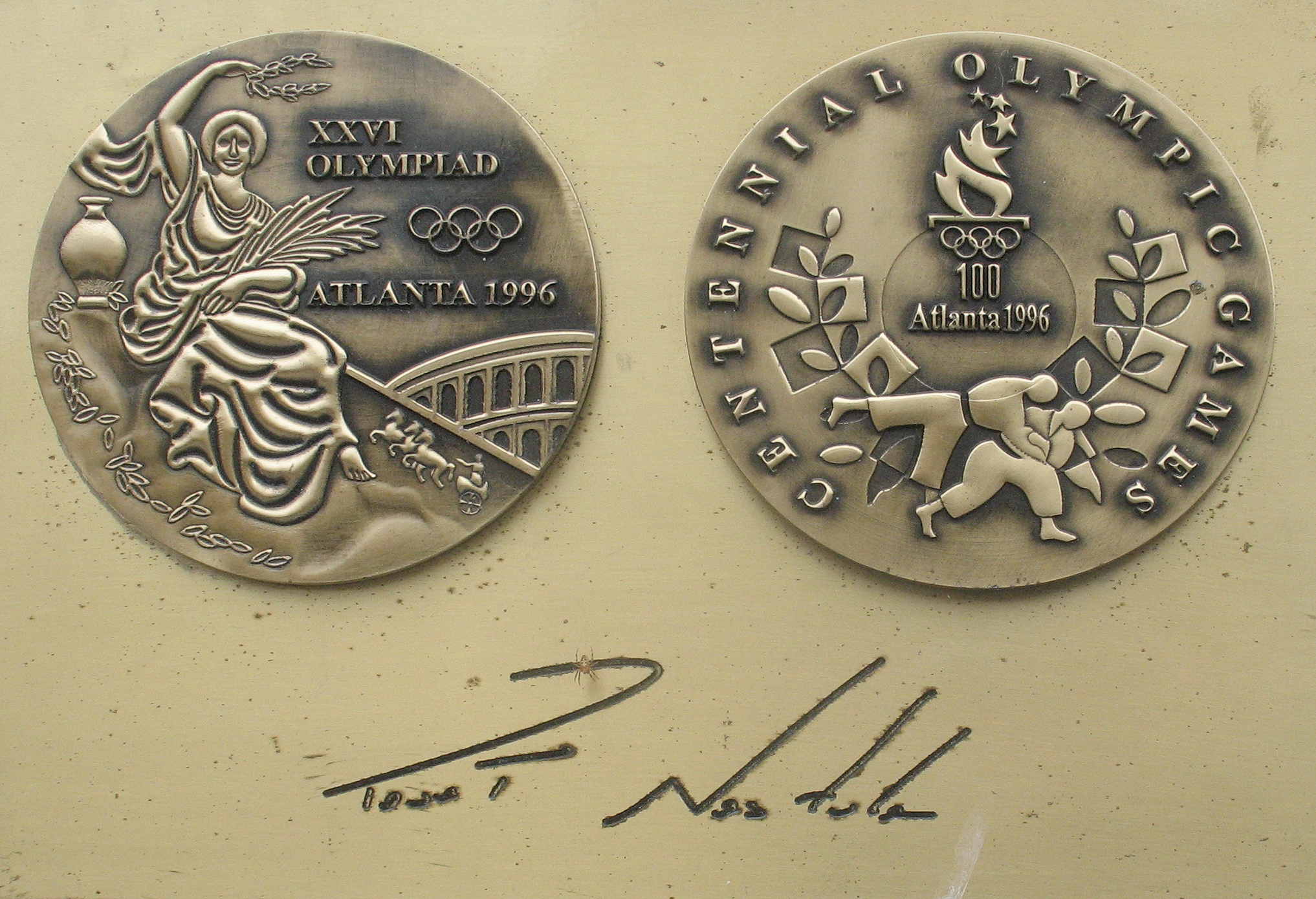
Copy of P. Nastula medal and autograph in Sports Star Avenue in Dziwnów

Paweł Marcin Nastula (born 26 June 1970) is a Polish judoka and mixed martial artist. He was the 1995 and 1997 Judo World Champion, and the 1996 Olympic Champion in Atlanta, Georgia, United States, winning those titles in the ‍–‍95 kg weight category.

== Early career ==
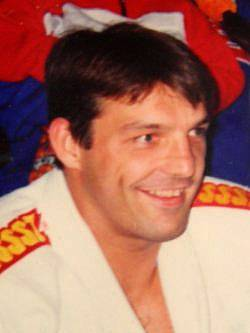
Nastula in 1998

Nastula was born in Warsaw, and started training Judo at the age of 10 at AZS AWF.

=== Judo ===
In addition to the 1996 Summer Olympics, Nastula won many European and World competitions, and was considered one of the top judo players in the world. Between February 1994 and March 1998 Nastula was unbeaten in Judo, having 312 consecutive wins over a period of those 1,220 days and winning every competition, a monumental feat. His winning streak snapped when the weight category was changed (from -95 kg to -100 kg).

He retired from the sport in 2004.

=== Mixed martial arts career ===
Nastula became interested in mixed martial arts after watching the first Hidehiko Yoshida and Royce Gracie bout in 2002. Shortly after, he signed up with Japanese promotion Pride Fighting Championship and was assigned to the Takada Dojo team, where he trained under Kazushi Sakuraba and other fighters in order to make the jump to the sport. Due to his record in judo, he was compared to Brazilian jiu-jitsu's Rickson Gracie.

=== Pride ===
Nastula received a very tough welcome to the PRIDE organization, as he was immediately pitted to face one of PRIDE's top heavyweight contenders and seasoned professionals in Antônio Rodrigo Nogueira. Due to his health and lack of experience, Nastula tried to negotiate a shorter fight with PRIDE Bushido rules and with both contenders wearing a gi, but Nogueira refused, so Pawel went for regular rules nonetheless. Nastula did well during the match, holding his own in the grappling exchanges for the first half of the round, but his inexperience was evident when Nogueira capitalized on his striking superiority, getting the upper hand in the mat with several knees to the head. After receiving a hard right hand, Nastula managed to get a takedown, but he was too tired to remain in the offensive role, and Nogueira found little resistance to unload ground and pound until the referee stop.

His second opponent would be perhaps an even tougher matchup, Alexander Emelianenko, sambo practitioner and brother of the legendary Fedor Emelianenko. The judoka performed better and controlled the earlier action both standing and on the ground, attempting armbars and taking Emelianenko's back, but his stamina played again against him. With his opponent tired, Alexander reversed him, took the mount and locked a rear naked choke for the submission.

In his third match in July 2006, he easily defeated the previously unbeaten MMA professional Edson Drago. Pawel threatened him with an inverted armbar from the bottom and later mounted him, throwing punches over the Brazilian and opening a cut in his eye. At the end, Nastula locked another armbar from the bottom and made Drago tap out.

Pawel's last fight in PRIDE would be against catch wrestler Josh Barnett in PRIDE 32: The Real Deal. The judoka again showed an excellent performance, taking down Barnett several times and landing effective left hooks, but Josh reversed him later in the match and executed a toehold to submit Nastula. It was later announced that he failed his NSAC-administered drug test. Nastula tested positive for the banned substance nandrolone as well as banned stimulants phenylpropanolamine, pseudoephedrine, and ephedrine. Nastula has denied the veracity of the test results, however, claiming that the stimulants were absorbed into his system from over-the-counter supplements and that nandrolone, a mass-building substance, would not have been useful to him as he has not gained any muscle mass since coming to PRIDE. According to an interview by the website www.budo.pl, Nastula has hired lawyers to solve the situation.

=== World Victory Road ===
Following the fall of PRIDE, Nastula signed with World Victory Road and competed at Sengoku 4, losing via a controversial TKO to Yang Dong Yi. After Dong narrowly escaped an armbar attempt from the judoka, Nastula was unable to answer the referee's call to stand up, having received numerous strikes to the groin earlier in the fight. At that moment, Nastula indicated problems with his protective cup, but instead of ordering it to be checked up, the referee inexplicably halted the bout and declared Yang the winner by TKO.

=== Return to MMA ===
In 2008 Nastula was signed by a new promotion from Poland, MCC (Martial Combat Club) and was expected to face Koji Kanechika in their event in May. Unfortunately, the promotion folded and the event was cancelled.
Since then, Paweł was reported to be in talks with various promotions from Poland. KSW stated to be in talks with Nastula several times, changing its mind about the event he should participate in. For example, Paweł was reported to face Mariusz Pudzianowski at KSW XIII, which was later changed to KSW XIV. However, after losing to Tim Sylvia, Pudzianowski pulled out of that fight.

Despite many failed returns to the ring, and no bouts since the Sengoku loss from August 2008, Paweł remained active, running his club (Nastula Club) in Warsaw and training with fighters like Robert Jocz, Jan Błachowicz and Krzysztof Kułak. However, after Pudzianowski's withdrawal from KSW XIV, Nastula stated in recent interviews, that he will retire if he won't get to fight in 2010.

In July 2010, Nastula signed with another new Polish promotion, Fighters Arena. Paweł made his anticipated comeback (and first ring appearance in Poland) at the inauginational show of the promotion in the Atlas Arena in Łódź, Poland, facing Yusuke Masuda (training partner of Hidehiko Yoshida) in the main event. Nastula proved to be in shape, as he quickly knocked down his opponent and followed with a flurry of punches on the ground, forcing the referee to stop the bout early at 0:26 of the first round.

At KSW 24, Nastula competed to crown the first KSW Heavyweight champion against Karol Bedorf. He lost the fight due to exhaustion in the second round.

== Personal life ==
Paweł is married and has two daughters.

For his sport achievements, he received the Knight's Cross of the Order of Polonia Restituta (5th Class) in 1996.

Nastula is the author of the book My Judo (2000), where he describes his favourite techniques and their combinations.

He took part in the 2009 Polish version of Dancing with the Stars, eventually finishing sixth overall.

== Mixed martial arts record ==
Professional record breakdown
11 matches	5 wins	6 losses
By knockout	2	3
By submission	3	2
By decision	0	1

Res.	Record	Opponent	Method	Event	Date	Round	Time	Location	Notes
Loss	5–6	Mariusz Pudzianowski	Decision (unanimous)	KSW 29	6 December 2014	3	3:00	Kraków, Poland	Fight of the Night.
Loss	5–5	Karol Bedorf	TKO (exhaustion)	KSW 24	28 September 2013	2	2:25	Łódź, Poland	For the inaugural KSW Heavyweight Championship.
Win	5–4	Kevin Asplund	Submission (americana)	KSW 22	16 March 2013	1	2:33	Warsaw, Poland	
Win	4–4	Jimmy Ambriz	Submission (hand injury)	STC: Bydgoszcz vs. Torun	1 October 2011	1	1:50	Bydgoszcz, Poland	Wins Streetfighters Team Cup Heavyweight Championship.
Win	3–4	Andrzej Wronski	TKO (punches)	Wieczór Mistrzów	20 August 2011	1	1:09	Koszalin, Poland	
Win	2–4	Yusuke Masuda	TKO (punches)	FAL: Fighters Arena Lódz	3 September 2010	1	0:26	Łódź, Poland	
Loss	1–4	Yang Dongi	TKO (exhaustion)	World Victory Road Presents: Sengoku 4	24 August 2008	2	2:15	Saitama, Japan	
Loss	1–3	Josh Barnett	Submission (toe hold)	Pride 32 - The Real Deal	21 October 2006	2	3:04	Las Vegas, Nevada, United States	Nastula tested positive for steroids.
Win	1–2	Edson Claas Vieira	Submission (armbar)	Pride FC - Critical Countdown Absolute	1 July 2006	1	4:33	Saitama, Japan	
Loss	0–2	Alexander Emelianenko	Submission (rear-naked choke)	Pride Shockwave 2005	31 December 2005	1	8:45	Saitama, Japan	
Loss	0–1	Antônio Rodrigo Nogueira	TKO (punches)	Pride Critical Countdown 2005	26 June 2005	1	8:38	Saitama, Japan	

== Awards and titles ==
=== Judo ===
- Olympic Games

- 1996 Atlanta 1st Prize (Gold Medal)

- World Championships

- 1991 Barcelona 2nd Prize
- 1995 Tokyo 1st Prize
- 1997 Paris 1st Prize

- European Championships

- 1994-1996 1st Prize
- 1999 Bratislava 2nd Prize

=== Mixed martial arts ===
- Konfrontacja Sztuk Walki
  - Fight of the Night (1 Time)
- Streetfighters Team Cup
  - Streetfighters Team Cup Heavyweight Championship (1 Time)
