= Judo at the 1992 Summer Olympics – Women's 66 kg =

Judo at the Olympics

Women's 66 kg at the Games of the XXV Olympiad
- Venue: Palau Blaugrana
- Date: 29 July 1992
- Competitors: 21 from 21 nations

Medalists
1st place, gold medalist(s)		Odalis Revé	Cuba
2nd place, silver medalist(s)		Emanuela Pierantozzi	Italy
3rd place, bronze medalist(s)		Kate Howey	Great Britain
3rd place, bronze medalist(s)		Heidi Rakels	Belgium

The women's 66 kg competition in judo at the 1992 Summer Olympics in Barcelona was held on 29 July at the Palau Blaugrana. The gold medal was won by Odalis Revé of Cuba.

== Results ==
=== Main brackets ===
==== Pool A ====
Round of 32
Emanuela Pierantozzi (ITA)	WAZ
Chantal Han (NED)	RA
Claire Lecat (FRA)	YUK
María del Carmen Bellón (ESP)	E
Laura Martinel (ARG)	RA
Alexandra Schreiber (GER)	WIP

Round of 16
Emanuela Pierantozzi (ITA)	IPO
Helena Miagian Papilaya (INA)	RA
Claire Lecat (FRA)	HAN
Laisa Laveti Tuifagalele (FIJ)	E
Alexandra Schreiber (GER)	WIP
Erin Lum (GUM)	RA
Sandra Greaves (CAN)	KOK
Ryoko Fujimoto (JPN)	E

Quarterfinal
Emanuela Pierantozzi (ITA)	KOK
Claire Lecat (FRA)	RA
Alexandra Schreiber (GER)	IPO
Sandra Greaves (CAN)	RA

Semifinal
Emanuela Pierantozzi (ITA)	IPO
Alexandra Schreiber (GER)	RB

==== Pool B ====
Round of 32
Park Ji-yeong (KOR)	E
Leng Chunhui (CHN)	WIP
Odalis Revé (CUB)	SOG
Wu Mei-ling (TPE)	RB

Round of 16
Leng Chunhui (CHN)	RB
Kate Howey (GBR)	WAZ
Heidi Rakels (BEL)	WIP
Rosicléia Campos (BRA)	E
Odalis Revé (CUB)	YUK
Grace Jividen (USA)	RB
Yelena Kotelnikova (EUN)	E
Anita Király (HUN)	KOK

Quarterfinal
Kate Howey (GBR)	YUS
Heidi Rakels (BEL)	RB
Odalis Revé (CUB)	WIP
Anita Király (HUN)	RB

Semifinal
Kate Howey (GBR)	RA
Odalis Revé (CUB)	YUS

=== Repechages ===
==== Repechage A ====
Repechage round 1
Chantal Han (NED)	KOK
Helena Miagian Papilaya (INA)	E
Laura Martinel (ARG)	IPO
Erin Lum (GUM)	E

Repechage quarterfinal
Chantal Han (NED)	E
Claire Lecat (FRA)	SHI
Laura Martinel (ARG)	IPO
Sandra Greaves (CAN)	E

Repechage semifinal
Claire Lecat (FRA)	IPO
Laura Martinel (ARG)	E

Repechage final
Claire Lecat (FRA)	E
Kate Howey (GBR)	WAZ (bronze)

==== Repechage B ====
Repechage round 1
Wu Mei-ling (TPE)	E
Grace Jividen (USA)	IPO

Repechage quarterfinal
Leng Chunhui (CHN)	E
Heidi Rakels (BEL)	YUK
Grace Jividen (USA)	WAZ
Anita Király (HUN)	E

Repechage semifinal
Heidi Rakels (BEL)	SHI
Grace Jividen (USA)	E

Repechage final
Heidi Rakels (BEL)	WAZ (bronze)
Alexandra Schreiber (GER)	E

=== Final ===
Final
Emanuela Pierantozzi (ITA)	2nd place, silver medalist(s)
Odalis Revé (CUB)	WIP (gold)

== Final classification ==
Rank	Judoka	Nation
1st place, gold medalist(s)	Odalis Revé	Cuba
2nd place, silver medalist(s)	Emanuela Pierantozzi	Italy
3rd place, bronze medalist(s)	Kate Howey	Great Britain
3rd place, bronze medalist(s)	Heidi Rakels	Belgium
5T	Claire Lecat	France
5T	Alexandra Schreiber	Germany
7T	Grace Jividen	United States
7T	Laura Martinel	Argentina
9T	Chantal Han	Netherlands
9T	Sandra Greaves	Canada
9T	Leng Chunhui	China
9T	Anita Király	Hungary
13T	Helena Miagian Papilaya	Indonesia
13T	Erin Lum	Guam
13T	Wu Mei-ling	Chinese Taipei
16T	Laisa Laveti Tuifagalele	Fiji
16T	Ryoko Fujimoto	Japan
16T	Rosicléia Campos	Brazil
16T	Yelena Kotelnikova	Unified Team
20T	María del Carmen Bellón	Spain
20T	Park Ji-yeong	South Korea
