= Anita Király =

Hungarian judoka

Personal information
- Born: 24 September 1971 (age 54) Eger, Hungary
- Height: 173 cm (5 ft 8 in)
- Weight: 66 kg (146 lb)

Sport
- Country: Hungary
- Sport: Judo

Anita Király (born 24 September 1971) is a Hungarian judoka. She competed in the women's middleweight event at the 1992 Summer Olympics.

== 1992 Summer Olympics ==
Event	Eliminations		Repechage	Final placing
Event	Opponent I	Opponent II	Opponent	Place
66 kg	(Commonwealth of Independent States) Yelena Kotelnikova (CIS); Won	(Cuba) Odalis Revé (CUB); Lost	(United States) Grace Jividen (USA); Lost	9th
