= Claire Lecat =

French judoka (born 1965)

Personal information
- Nationality: French
- Born: 6 July 1965 (age 60) Boulogne-sur-Mer, France

Sport
- Sport: Judo

Claire Lecat (born 6 July 1965) is a former French judoka, under 66 kg category. She was born on July 6, 1965, in Boulogne-sur-Mer, Pas-de-Calais, France. She studied in the Sport-Studies Program in Poitiers, then joined INSEP. She was member of the France Women's Judo Team at seventh dan black belt, and competed in the women's middleweight event at the 1992 Summer Olympics.

== Athletic Career ==
Lecat won the 1988 Tournoi de Paris and French Championships. In 1989 she gain won the French Championships and got third place at the Tournoi de Paris. At the 1989 European Judo Championships, she lost the quarterfinals to Italy's Emanuela Pierantozzi. With two wins in the repechage, she reached the bronze medal match, which she won against Chantal Han of the Netherlands. Five month later she lost to Japanese judoka Hikari Yamada in the quarterfinals of the 1989 World Judo Championships. As for the European Championships, she reached the repechage round for bronze, and won again against Chantal Han. In 1990, Lecat won the Tournoi de Paris for the second time. At 1990 European Judo Championships, she lost to German player Alexandra Schreiber, but won the bronze medal match against Yelena Kotelnikova from Soviet Union.

In 1992, she got second place at the Tournoi de Paris, behind South Korean player Cho Min-sun. At the Judo Competition at the 1992 Summer Olympics, Lecat lost the quarterfinals to Emanuela Pierantozzi. After victories over Chantal Han and Argentinian Laura Martinel, Lecat lost the bronze medal match to British player Kate Howey and thus finished fifth. In 1993 Lecat was again the second place in French Championships behind Alice Dubois.

== Awards ==
- Olympic Games
  - 5th at 1992 Summer Olympics Judo Competition (under 66 kg).
- World Championship
  - Bronze medal at the 1989 World Championship (under 66 kg)
