= Ron Tripp =

American martial artist

- Born: Ronald Tripp; 22 April 1953 (age 73); Battle Creek, Michigan
- Other names: The Terminator
- Nationality: (United States)
- Height: 1.82 m (6 ft 0 in)
- Weight: 95 kg (209 lb)
- Division: Heavyweight
- Style: Judo, Sambo
- Fighting out of: Norman, Oklahoma
- Team: USA Stars
- Trainer: Pat Burris, US; Chonosuke Takagi, Japan
- Rank: Grand Master of Sport in Sambo; 6th Dan Black Belt in Judo
- Years active: 1970–1995 (martial arts)

Other information
- Occupation: Chiropractor; Martial artist

Ron Tripp (born April 22, 1953) is an American chiropractor, sports executive, coach, and former competitor in judo and sambo.

He is well known in the martial arts community, especially among Brazilian jiu-jitsu and submission grappling enthusiasts, for being the only person to hold an official victory in competition over Brazilian jiu-jitsu legend Rickson Gracie. Tripp became America's first Merited and Distinguished Master of Sport in 1996. He was promoted to 6th dan by USA Judo in November 2006.

== Biography ==
=== Education ===
A native of Lake Orion, Michigan, and graduate of Hillsdale College and Palmer College of Chiropractic.

=== Judo and Sambo Career ===
The 6-foot, 205 pound Tripp excelled in both the sports of judo and sambo. Trained by Pat Burris, two-time judo Olympian and Olympic judo coach, Tripp's competitive career in judo lasted from 1982 to 1995. He was an assistant wrestling coach at the University of Oklahoma under hall of fame coach Stan Abel from 1979 to 1992. Tripp trained in Japan for six years, and during that time trained under World Judo Champion Chonosuke Takagi at Nihon University, home of mixed martial arts (MMA) fighter and Olympic champion Makoto Takimoto and two-time All Japan judo champion Jun Konno.

==== Match with Rickson Gracie ====
At the 1993 U.S. Sambo Championships in Norman, Oklahoma, Tripp faced undefeated Rickson Gracie of the Gracie jiu-jitsu family. Tripp threw Gracie to the canvas by "uchi mata" in 47 seconds, thus giving Tripp the win under FIAS international sambo rules. Rickson disputed this loss, claiming he was misinformed of the rules of the event despite claiming to be a two-time Pan American Sambo Champion.

=== Coaching ===
In 2006, he founded C3Fights, a professional MMA company, and personally trained C3Fighters at the USA Stars Training Center in Oklahoma City, Oklahoma and coached and cornered UFC fighters Joe Stevenson and Melvin Guillard at UFC events.

== Career highlights ==
- 1970-1994: Competed in judo, sambo, and wrestling tournaments
- 1990: Submitted by Rigan Machado in 39 seconds, Pan Am finals
- 1993: Defeated Rickson Gracie by uchi mata in 47 seconds, U.S. Sambo Championships
- 1994: Defeated Andrew Bourdeau to win the FIAS World Heavyweight Championship of Sambo in Montreal, Canada

== Awards and titles ==
=== Sport ===
- 1994 World Sambo Champion
- 7-time World Medalist Sambo
- 1989 World Judo Team Belgrade (lost first fight against Bjarni Friðriksson)
- Mifune Cup Team Bronze Medalist Open Division
- Three time Sambo National Champion (1988, 1989, 1990)
- Winner of the first Bart Conner Award Recognizing Oklahoma's Most Outstanding Athlete 1987
- 2010 Recipient of the Annual Pioneers of Sambo by the American Sombo Association
- President of USA Judo 2000-2008
- Member of U.S. Olympic Committee 2000-2004
- Co-founder and President of C3Fights
- Three time U.S. Olympic Festival Medal winner (1986, 1987, 1990)

=== Career ===
- Merited Master of Sports
- President of the Oklahoma Board of Chiropractic Examiners (1997–)
- District Director, Federation of Chiropractic Licensing Boards (2003–2009)
- Chairman of the FCLB Board of Directors 2008-2009
- Recipient of the FCLB George W. Ardvison Award 2010, Baltimore
- Vice-chairman of the Board of International Oil and Gas Holdings
- Elected as a Director of the National Board of Chiropractic Examiners in May 2011
