= Ushijima =

Ushijima (written: 牛島 lit. "cow island") is a Japanese surname. Notable people with the surname include:

- Kazuhiko Ushijima (牛島 和彦, born 1961), Japanese baseball player
- Margaret Ushijima (1927–2013), Hawaiian lawyer
- Mitsuru Ushijima (牛島 満, 1887–1945), Japanese general
- Reece Ushijima (born 2003), Japanese-American racing driver
- Shigeaki Ushijima (牛島 茂昭, born 1977), Japanese luger
- Tatsukuma Ushijima (牛島 辰熊, 1904–1985), Japanese judoka

== Fictional characters ==
- Wakatoshi Ushijima (牛島 若利), a character in the manga series Haikyu!!

== See also ==
- Ushijima the Loan Shark, a Japanese manga series
