= 1991 Asian Judo Championships =

Judo competition

The 1991 Asian Judo Championships were held at Osaka, Japan on 9–10, November.

== Medal overview ==
=== Men's events ===
Event	Gold	Silver	Bronze
Extra-lightweight (60 kg)	Yoon Hyun (KOR)	L. Rentsendorj (MGL)	Tadashi Itakusu (JPN)
Extra-lightweight (60 kg)	Yoon Hyun (KOR)	L. Rentsendorj (MGL)	Lin Wen-Liang (TPE)
Half-lightweight (65 kg)	Kenji Maruyama (JPN)	Han Bo-Sam (KOR)	Kim Hyo-Son (KOR)
Half-lightweight (65 kg)	Kenji Maruyama (JPN)	Han Bo-Sam (KOR)	Biala (IND)
Lightweight (71 kg)	Chung Hoon (KOR)	Khaliuny Boldbaatar (MGL)	Kim (PRK)
Lightweight (71 kg)	Chung Hoon (KOR)	Khaliuny Boldbaatar (MGL)	Hideyuki Sakai (JPN)
Half-middleweight (78 kg)	Jeon Man-Bae (KOR)	Yoshiyuki Takanami (JPN)	Luo Wei-You (TPE)
Half-middleweight (78 kg)	Jeon Man-Bae (KOR)	Yoshiyuki Takanami (JPN)	D. Dorjbat (MGL)
Middleweight (86 kg)	Yoshio Nakamura (JPN)	Dehghani (IRI)	Kim Seok-Gyu (KOR)
Middleweight (86 kg)	Yoshio Nakamura (JPN)	Dehghani (IRI)	T. Tserenpuntsag (MGL)
Half-heavyweight (95 kg)	Michiaki Kamochi (JPN)	Zareian (IRI)	Lee Chung-Seok (KOR)
Half-heavyweight (95 kg)	Michiaki Kamochi (JPN)	Zareian (IRI)	Batbayar (MGL)
Heavyweight (+95 kg)	Kim Kun-Soo (KOR)	Hideyuki Sekine (JPN)	Odvogin Baljinnyam (MGL)
Heavyweight (+95 kg)	Kim Kun-Soo (KOR)	Hideyuki Sekine (JPN)	Guo Yubin (CHN)
Openweight	Jun Konno (JPN)	B.Badmaanyambuu (MGL)	Yen Kuo-che (TPE)
Openweight	Jun Konno (JPN)	B.Badmaanyambuu (MGL)	Guo Yubin (CHN)

=== Women's events ===
Event	Gold	Silver	Bronze
Extra-lightweight (48 kg)	Tang Lihong (CHN)	Huang Yu-Shin (TPE)	Ryoko Tamura (JPN)
Extra-lightweight (48 kg)	Tang Lihong (CHN)	Huang Yu-Shin (TPE)	Erdenet-Od (MGL)
Half-lightweight (52 kg)	Su (CHN)	Mutsumi Ueda (JPN)	Kim Eun-Hee (KOR)
Half-lightweight (52 kg)	Su (CHN)	Mutsumi Ueda (JPN)	Chou Yu-Ping (TPE)
Lightweight (56 kg)	Jung Sung-Sook (KOR)	Chiyori Tateno (JPN)	Lai Wah Law (HKG)
Lightweight (56 kg)	Jung Sung-Sook (KOR)	Chiyori Tateno (JPN)	Zeng Hsiao-Fen (TPE)
Half-middleweight (61 kg)	Wang Yangbei (CHN)	Koo Hyun-Suk (KOR)	Lkhamaasürengiin Badamsuren (MGL)
Half-middleweight (61 kg)	Wang Yangbei (CHN)	Koo Hyun-Suk (KOR)	Hiroko Kitazume (JPN)
Middleweight (66 kg)	Ryoko Fujimoto (JPN)	Wu Jiu-Ling (TPE)	Yalin (INA)
Middleweight (66 kg)	Ryoko Fujimoto (JPN)	Wu Jiu-Ling (TPE)	Keum Jin-Hee (KOR)
Half-heavyweight (72 kg)	Yoko Tanabe (JPN)	Leng Chunhui (CHN)	Cho Hyun-Suk (KOR)
Half-heavyweight (72 kg)	Yoko Tanabe (JPN)	Leng Chunhui (CHN)	Hsu Yu-Gu (TPE)
Heavyweight (+72 kg)	Qiao Yanmin (CHN)	Yukari Asada (JPN)	Chak Mi-Jeong (KOR)
Heavyweight (+72 kg)	Qiao Yanmin (CHN)	Yukari Asada (JPN)	Chen Mei-Hui (TPE)
Openweight	Qiao Yanmin (CHN)	Cho Hyun-Suk (KOR)	Noriko Matsuo (JPN)
Openweight	Qiao Yanmin (CHN)	Cho Hyun-Suk (KOR)	Sambuu Dashdulam (MGL)

=== Medals table ===
Rank	Nation	Gold	Silver	Bronze	Total
1	Japan	6	5	5	16
2	South Korea	5	3	7	15
3	China	5	1	2	8
4	Mongolia	0	3	7	10
5	Chinese Taipei	0	2	7	9
6	Iran	0	2	0	2
7	Hong Kong	0	0	1	1
7	India	0	0	1	1
7	Indonesia	0	0	1	1
7	North Korea	0	0	1	1
Totals (10 entries)		16	16	32	64
