= Mitani =

Mitani may refer to:

- Mitani (surname), a Japanese surname (see for a list of people with that name)
- 3289 Mitani, a minor planet
- Mitani Station (Okayama), a train station in Japan
- Mitani Station (Yamaguchi), a train station in Japan

== See also ==
- Mitanni, an ancient state in the Near East
- Mithiani, a town in Pakistan
