= Chonosuke Takagi =

Japanese judoka

Personal information
- Born: 26 October 1948
- Died: 6 December 2016 (aged 68)
- Occupation: Judoka

Sport
- Sport: Judo
Medal record
Representing Japan
Men's Judo
World Championships
Gold medal – first place	1973 Lausanne	+93 kg
Bronze medal – third place	1975 Vienna	+93 kg

Profile at external databases
- JudoInside.com: 5487

Chonosuke Takagi (高木 長之助, Takagi Chōnosuke; 26 October 1948 – 6 December 2016) was a Japanese judoka.

Takagi is from Shirahama, Chiba and began judo when he was in junior high school.

When he was a member of judo club at Awa high-school (安房高校, Awa Kōkō), the senior of club is Masatoshi Shinomaki.

Takagi began working for the Tokyo Metropolitan Police Department after graduation from Nihon University in 1971. He participated in the World Championship twice and won a gold medal in 1973 and a bronze medal in 1975.

As of 2011, Takagi coached judo at his alma mater, Nihon University. Among his students are Jun Konno, Michiaki Kamochi, Makoto Takimoto and others. He died of a heart attack at the age of 68 on 6 December 2016.

== Achievements ==
- 1970
  - All-Japan Weight Class Championships (Heavyweight) 1st
- 1972
  - All-Japan Weight Class Championships (Heavyweight) 2nd
- 1973
  - World Championships (Heavyweight) 1st
  - All-Japan Championships (Openweight only) 2nd
- 1975
  - World Championships (Heavyweight) 3rd
  - All-Japan Championships (Openweight only) 2nd
- 1976
  - All-Japan Championships (Openweight only) 3rd
- 1977
  - All-Japan Championships (Openweight only) 3rd
- 1978
  - Jigoro Kano Cup (Heavyweight) 3rd
  - All-Japan Championships (Openweight only) 2nd
- 1980
  - All-Japan Weight Class Championships (Heavyweight) 3rd
