= Michiaki =

- Gender: Male

Origin
- Origin: Japanese
- Meaning: Different meanings depending on the kanji used

Michiaki (written: 倫明, 道明, 道章, 道秋 or 宙明) is a masculine Japanese given name. Notable people with the name include:

- Michiaki Furuya (古屋 道秋) (born 1972), Japanese voice actor
- Michiaki Kakimoto (柿本 倫明) (born 1977), Japanese footballer
- Michiaki Kamada (鎌田 道章) (1890–1947), Imperial Japanese Navy admiral
- Michiaki Kamochi (賀持 道明) (born 1970), Japanese judoka
- Michiaki Watanabe (渡辺 宙明; born 1925), Japanese composer
