= Takahiko Ishikawa =

Japanese judoka (1917–2008)

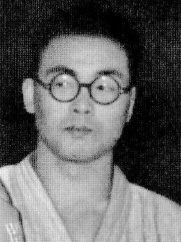
- Takahiko Ishikawa (1949)

Personal information
- Born: 15 May 1917
- Died: 9 June 2008 (aged 91)
- Occupation: Judoka

Sport
- Sport: Judo
- Rank: 9th dan black belt

Takahiko Ishikawa (石川隆彦, Ishikawa Takahiko, 1917–2008) was an All Japan Judo Champion. In the 1949 All-Japan Judo Championships Tahahiko fought Masahiko Kimura to a draw. In the following year he became the champion and subsequently placed three more times in the semi-finals and then retired.

== Judo ==
He would teach in Havana Cuba and help to bring it up to an elite level. Takahiko taught Judo in Philadelphia as well as Virginia Beach. For many years he was the highest ranking black belt in the United States. He became 9th Dan before he died.

== Media ==
Tahahiko is the author of Judo Training Methods: A Sourcebook.
