= Heidi Rakels =

Belgian judoka

Personal information
- Born: 22 June 1968 (age 58)
- Occupation: Judoka
- Website: www.rakels.be

Sport
- Country: Belgium
- Sport: Judo
- Weight class: ‍–‍66 kg, –‍78 kg

Achievements and titles
- Olympic Games: (bronze) (1992)
- World Champ.: R16 (1999, 2001)
- European Champ.: (silver) (1992, 2001)
Medal record
Women's judo
Representing Belgium
Olympic Games
Bronze medal – third place	1992 Barcelona	‍–‍66 kg
European Championships
Silver medal – second place	1992 Paris	‍–‍66 kg
Silver medal – second place	2001 Paris	‍–‍78 kg
Bronze medal – third place	1999 Bratislava	‍–‍78 kg

Profile at external databases
- IJF: 53157
- JudoInside.com: 188
- Updated on 5 June 2023

Heidi Rakels (born 22 June 1968 in Leuven, Flemish Brabant) is a female retired judoka from Belgium.

Rakels claimed a bronze medal in the Women's Middleweight (‍–‍66 kg) division at the 1992 Summer Olympics in Barcelona, Spain. In the bronze medal match she defeated Germany's Alexandra Schreiber. She also competed at the 2000 Summer Olympics in Sydney, Australia.
