= Kate Howey =

British judoka (born 1973)

Kate Howey MBE
Personal information
- Full name: Kate Louise Howey
- Nationality: British (English)
- Born: 31 May 1973 (age 53) Andover, Hampshire, England
- Occupation: Judoka

Sport
- Country: Great Britain
- Sport: Judo
- Weight class: –66 kg, –70 kg, –72 kg

Achievements and titles
- Olympic Games: (silver) (2000)
- World Champ.: (gold) (1997)
- European Champ.: (silver) (1990, 1991, 2000)
Medal record
Women's judo
Representing Great Britain
Olympic Games
Silver medal – second place	2000 Sydney	‍–‍70 kg
Bronze medal – third place	1992 Barcelona	‍–‍66 kg
World Championships
Gold medal – first place	1997 Paris	‍–‍66 kg
Silver medal – second place	1993 Hamilton	‍–‍72 kg
Silver medal – second place	2001 Munich	‍–‍70 kg
Bronze medal – third place	1991 Barcelona	‍–‍66 kg
Bronze medal – third place	1999 Birmingham	‍–‍70 kg
European Championships
Silver medal – second place	1990 Frankfurt	‍–‍66 kg
Silver medal – second place	1991 Prague	‍–‍66 kg
Silver medal – second place	2000 Wrocław	‍–‍70 kg
Bronze medal – third place	1993 Athens	‍–‍72 kg
Bronze medal – third place	1994 Gdansk	‍–‍72 kg
Bronze medal – third place	1995 Birmingham	‍–‍72 kg
Bronze medal – third place	1997 Oostende	‍–‍66 kg
Bronze medal – third place	1998 Oviedo	‍–‍70 kg
World Juniors Championships
Gold medal – first place	1990 Dijon	‍–‍66 kg
European Junior Championships
Gold medal – first place	1989 Athens	‍–‍66 kg
Gold medal – first place	1990 Ankara	‍–‍66 kg
Gold medal – first place	1991 Pieksämäki	‍–‍66 kg
Summer Universiade
Bronze medal – third place	1999 Palma de Mallorca	‍–‍70 kg

Profile at external databases
- IJF: 1114
- JudoInside.com: 321
- Updated on 2 June 2023

Kate Louise Howey MBE (born 31 May 1973 in Andover, Hampshire, England) is a former elite British judoka. She remains the only British woman to have won two Olympic judo medals (silver at the 2000 Olympics in Sydney, and bronze at the 1992 Olympics in Barcelona) and shares with fellow Olympic medalist Karina Bryant the record of being the only British judoka to have competed at four Olympic Games.

== Biography ==
Howey was born in Andover, Hampshire, and took up judo at the age of seven. In 1989, she became champion of Great Britain, winning the middleweight (66 kg) division at the British Judo Championships. The following year in 1990, she won her first international medal when taking a silver medal at the 1990 European Judo Championships in Frankfurt.

In 1991, she won the bronze medal at the 1991 World Judo Championships, in Barcelona and the silver medal at the 1991 European Judo Championships in Prague. The year 1992 saw her first of four appearances at the Olympic Games. In the women's 66 kg she reached the semi-finals only to lose out to eventual gold medal winner Odalis Revé, however she managed to win the repechage to claim a bronze medal. In 1993, she won her third consecutive (and fourth) British title.

Howey continued to participate in most major championships, winning a World championship silver and European championship bronze in 1993 at the heavier weight of 72 kg, and two more bronze medals at the 1994 European Judo Championships and 1995 European Judo Championships.

In 1996, Howey was selected for her second Olympic Games reaching the quarter-finals where she was defeated by eventual silver medalist Yoko Tanabe of Japan. Howey recorded her best result in 1997 following a drop back down in weight category to 66 kg. At the 1997 World Judo Championships in Paris, she won the gold medal after defeating Anja von Rekowski in the final. She won another European bronze in 1997.

After a seventh European Championships medal and a fifth British title in 1998, she trained at the University of Bath. In 1999, she was unable to retain her World title but gained compensation with a bronze medal and the following year she won a European silver in May, before she went to her third Olympics. At the 2000 Summer Olympics she competed in the women's 70 kg and performed superbly reaching the final where she lost out to Sibelis Veranes for the gold medal. In 2001, she won a silver medal at the 2001 World Judo Championships, in Munich and won her sixth and final British title in 2002. Also in 2002 she was left out of the Commonwealth Games squad in favour of Samantha Lowe and would never get the opportunity to take part in a Commonwealth Games. Howey was shocked at her omission and would likely have won gold but Lowe did go on to win gold for England.

Her final major appearance was at the 2004 Summer Olympics, in Athens, where she was honored to bear the national flag at the opening ceremony. She announced her retirement from competition on 27 October 2004, having competed for 16 years. Following her retirement, she continued as a coach (Head Coach 2018) for the British Judo Association, she coached Gemma Gibbons to silver at the 2012 Summer Olympics in London, ending her nation's wait for an Olympic medal in the sport that had stretched back to her own silver in 2000. By contrast, having waited 12 years for Olympic medal, only 24 hours later, her now-veteran former teammate, Karina Bryant also won a bronze medal.

In June 2025 Howey, one of the most decorated judoka in British Judo history, was announced as British Judo's new Performance Director of the World Class Performance Programme (WCPP).

== Recognition ==
Howey was appointed Member of the Order of the British Empire (MBE) for services to judo in the 1999 Birthday Honours.
