= Mithiani railway station =

Railway station in Sindh, Pakistan

Coordinates: 26.860086°N 67.997742°E

General information
- Owner: Ministry of Railways

Other information
- Station code: MTNI

History
- Former names: Great Indian Peninsula Railway
Location

Mithiani railway station (Urdu: مٹھیانی ریلوے اسٹیشن) is located in town of Mithiani, Sindh Pakistan.

== See also ==
- List of railway stations in Pakistan
- Pakistan Railways
