= María del Carmen Bellón =

Spanish judoka

Personal information
- Nationality: Spanish
- Born: 26 May 1964 (age 60); Linares, Spain

Sport
- Sport: Judo

María del Carmen Bellón (born 26 May 1964) is a Spanish judoka. She competed in the women's middleweight event at the 1992 Summer Olympics.
