= Erin Lum =

Judoka from Guam

Personal information
- Nationality: Guam
- Born: 2 February 1977 (age 48)

Sport
- Sport: Judo

Erin Lum (born 2 February 1977) is a judoka from Guam. She competed in the women's middleweight event at the 1992 Summer Olympics.
