= Michiaki Kamochi =

Japanese judoka (born 1970)

Medal record

Representing Japan

Men's Judo

Asian Championships
Gold medal – first place	1991 Osaka	-95 kg

East Asian Games
Silver medal – second place	1993 Shanghai	-95 kg

Michiaki Kamochi (賀持 道明, Kamochi Michiaki; born 1970) is a retired Japanese judoka.

Kamochi is from Warabi, Saitama. He began Sumo at the age of 3rd grader and won the championship consecutively for six years. He also began judo at his junior high school days and when he was a student of Nihon University, he was trained by former world champion, Chonosuke Takagi.

In 1991, he participated in the World Championships held in Barcelona. He also participated Asian Championships in Osaka and won a gold medal at the half-heavyweight category.

Kamochi belonged to JRA after graduation from university in 1992. He retired in 1999 after All-Japan Teams Championships.

== Achievements ==
- 1989 - All-Japan Junior Championships (-95 kg) 1st

- All-Japan Selected Championships (-95 kg) 3rd
- Kodokan Cup (-95 kg) 3rd

- 1990 : World University Championships (-95 kg) 1st

- Jigoro Kano Cup (-95 kg) 2nd
- All-Japan Selected Championships (-95 kg) 3rd
- All-Japan University Championships (-95 kg) 3rd

- 1991 - World Championships (-95 kg) 5th

- Asian Championships (-95 kg) 1st
- Kodokan Cup (-95 kg) 1st
- All-Japan Selected Championships (-95 kg) 2nd
- All-Japan University Championships (-95 kg) 1st

- 1992 - Jigoro Kano Cup (-95 kg) 2nd

- All-Japan Selected Championships (-95 kg) 3rd
- Kodokan Cup (-95 kg) 3rd

- 1993 - East Asian Games (-95 kg) 2nd

- All-Japan Selected Championships (-95 kg) 2nd

- 1994 - Jigoro Kano Cup (-95 kg) 3rd

- All-Japan Selected Championships (-95 kg) 1st
- Kodokan Cup (-95 kg) 3rd
- Kodokan Cup (-95 kg) 1st

- 1995 - All-Japan Selected Championships (-95 kg) 3rd

- Kodokan Cup (-95 kg) 3rd

- 1996 - Jigoro Kano Cup (-95 kg) 2nd

- All-Japan Championships (Openweight only) 3rd
- All-Japan Selected Championships (-95 kg) 2nd
- Kodokan Cup (-95 kg) 3rd

- 1997 - All-Japan Selected Championships (-95 kg) 3rd
