= Mitani (surname) =

Mitani is a Japanese surname. Notable people with this name include:

- Koichiro Mitani (born 1968), judoka
- Kōki Mitani (born 1961), playwright
- Minatsu Mitani (born 1991), badminton player
- Mitsuo Mitani (born 1959), politician
- Mitani Takanobu (1892–1985), government official
- Zen Mitani (born 2007), motorcycle racer
