= Masahiko Kimura =

Japanese judoka and professional wrestler

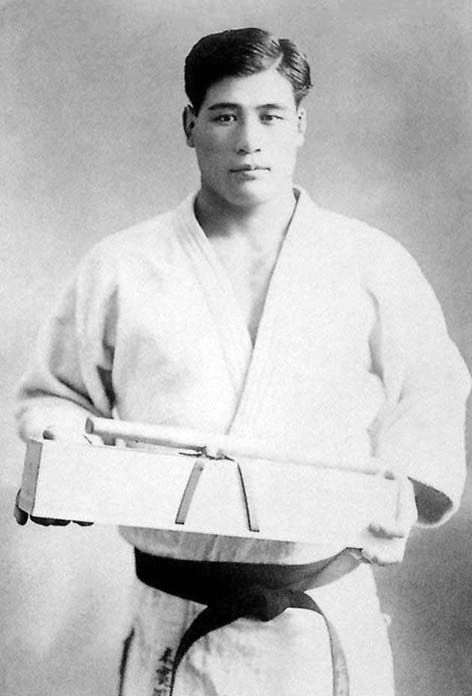
- Kimura in 1940

Personal information
- Nationality: Japanese
- Born: September 10, 1917 Kumamoto, Empire of Japan
- Died: April 18, 1993 (aged 75) Tokyo, Japan
- Education: Takushoku University
- Occupations: Judoka, professional wrestler
- Height: 170 cm (5 ft 7 in)
- Weight: 84 kg (185 lb)

Sport
- Sport: Judo
- Rank: 7th dan black belt

Profile at external databases
- JudoInside.com: 5408

Masahiko Kimura (木村 政彦, Kimura Masahiko; 10 September 1917 – 18 April 1993) was a Japanese judoka and professional wrestler. He won the All-Japan Judo Championships three times in a row from 1937 to 1939 for the first time in history, and had never lost a judo match from 1936 to 1950. In submission grappling, the reverse ude-garami arm lock is often called the "Kimura", due to his famous victory over Gracie jiu-jitsu co-founder Hélio Gracie. In the Japanese professional wrestling world, he is known for being one of Japan's earliest stars and the controversial match he had with Rikidōzan.

== Biography ==
Kimura was born on September 10, 1917, in Kumamoto, Japan. Masahiko Kimura began training judo at the age of 9, motivated by revenge to get back at his teacher Mr. Tagawa, who was a 1st dan Judo Black Belt and who often scolded Kimura. He believed that if he achieved the rank of 2nd Dan, he would be able to beat Mr. Tagawa. He first earned his black belt after transferring to Chinsei Junior High, where he underwent a promotion test. In the promotion test he threw 5 students of Kumamoto Junior High, passing his test and achieving 1st dan. For his 3rd dan promotion, he had to undertake a physical and written test at the headquarters of Butokukai in Kyoto. Although he passed his physical test, he cheated on his written exam by writing his own name on someone else's test paper, an act he said filled him with guilt. He was promoted to yondan (4th dan) at the age of 15. He had defeated six opponents (who were all 3rd and 4th dan) in a row. In 1935, at age 18 he became the youngest ever godan (5th degree black belt) when he defeated eight consecutive opponents at Kodokan (headquarters for the worldwide judo community).

Kimura was also known to engage in street fights. In Chinsei Junior High, students proficient in martial arts would be targeted by delinquents for clout. In one instance, a member of the Judo club named Iida, met Kimura outside of school premises and attacked him with a knife. Kimura received a wound in his buttocks and chased Iida to his home. Iida's parents intervened by apologizing on his behalf. In another instance, an infamous street fighter from Kumamoto Commerce Junior High, challenged Kimura in Shimogawara park. He attacked Kimura with a tantō short sword, but Kimura evaded the attack and performed a Judo throw on him, disarming him. No other street fighter challenged him after this incident.

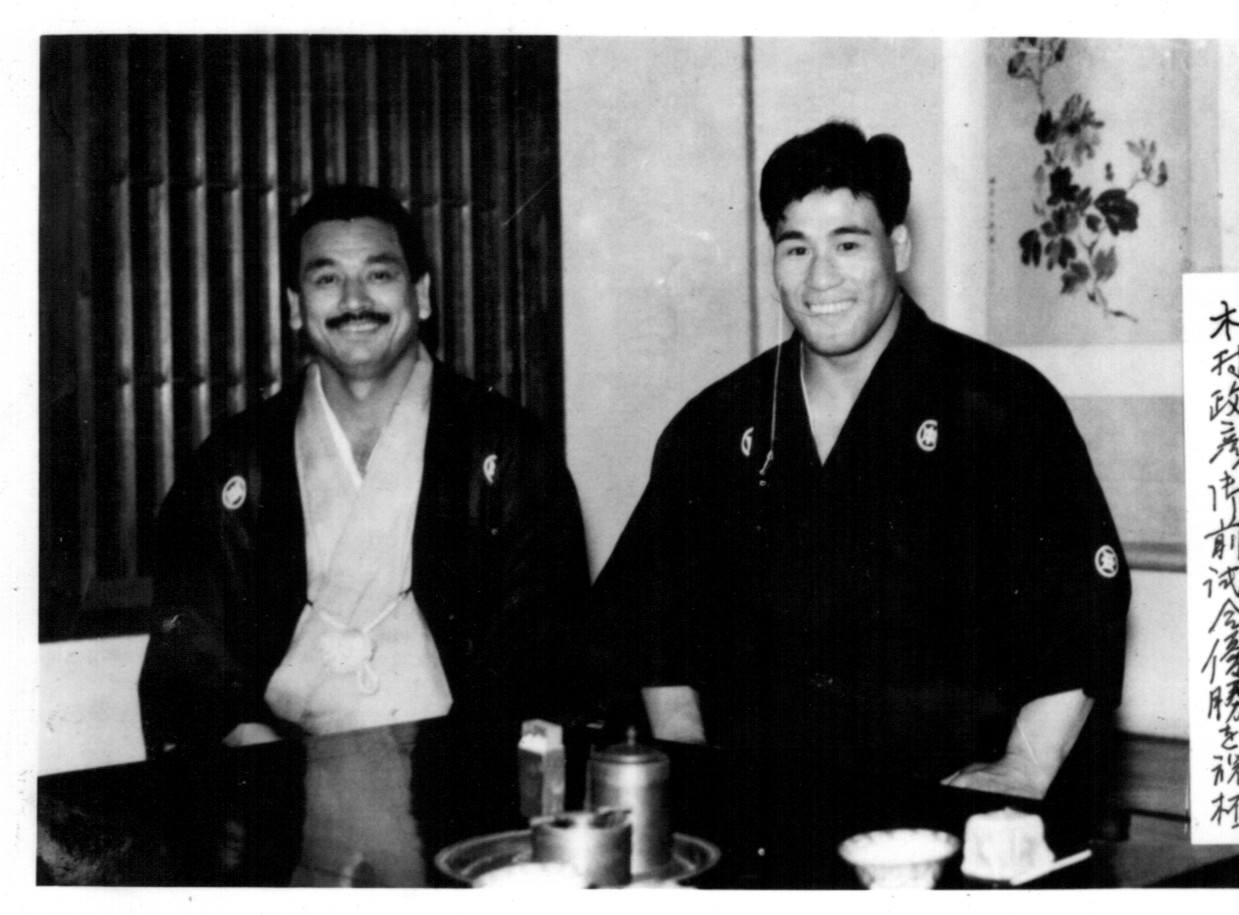
Kimura (right) along with his teacher Tatsukuma Ushijima (left).

Kimura's remarkable success can in part be attributed to his fanatical training regimen, managed by his teacher, Tatsukuma Ushijima. At one point, Kimura won eight matches in a tournament and lost his 9th bout against a Judoka called Miyajima. Ushijima sensei gave him a series of slaps and stated: "Shiai is equivalent to a real sword 'Kill or Get Killed' duel between Bushi. To throw the opponent means to kill him. Being thrown means being killed. You killed 8 men, and got killed by the 9th man. Remember, if you devote your life in judo, you can survive only by throwing your opponents or fighting to a draw no matter how many tough opponents you face."

On January 11, 1942, Kimura entered the Amaki Air Defence Unit poised to join World War II. One day it was announced that an 8th dan master of Jukendo (who remains anonymous) was visiting. During training, he issued a general challenge for combat. When no one came forward, Kimura reluctantly accepted after being urged by his captain. Recognizing his lack of skill in bayonet combat, he instead distracted the Jukendo master by throwing his wooden gun at him and went for a Morote Gari (double leg takedown) and then mounted him, winning the fight. His victory against the Jukendo master impressed his superiors, so much so that the captain of his unit ordered Kimura to withdraw his volunteer application to be stationed at Solomon Islands. The captain felt that the Solomon Islands would soon be bombarded by Allied Forces and therefore, Kimura could better serve his country by using his talents in Judo.

After the end of World War II, there was a clamp down on Japanese martial arts ordered by the GHQ, in order to suppress Japanese military nationalism. In his autobiography, Kimura recalled that while he was waiting in line for a train at Mukae-Machi station near Kumamoto, 4 men from the US Army Military Police arrived and started heckling and physically abusing Japanese people in line. When Kimura resisted they surrounded him and led him towards Nagaroku Bridge where they fought him. Kimura defeated the first MP by blocking his right punch and kicking him in the groin, he threw the second MP into a river with a Seoi-Nage, he delivered a headbutt into the third MP and incapacitated the last MP by squeezing his testicles. He later stated that he fought to defend the honor of Judo. Fearing retaliation from the Military Police he began keeping a low profile. A week later he was invited to the headquarters of the Military police by Captain Shepard, who thanked Kimura for intervening and punishing the four MPs, explaining that they were well known for harassing, threatening and even sexually assaulting Japanese citizens. Captain Shepard further asked Kimura to come to the MP headquarters once or twice a week to teach them Judo. Captain Shepard would go on to earn a 1st degree Black Belt.

Kimura reportedly lost only four judo matches in his lifetime, all occurring in 1935. He considered quitting judo after those losses, but through the encouragement of friends he began training again. He consistently practiced the leg throw osoto gari (large outer reap) against a tree. Daily randori or sparring sessions at Tokyo Police and Kodokan dōjōs resulted in numerous opponents suffering from concussions and losing consciousness. Many opponents asked Kimura not to use his osoto gari.

At the height of his career, Kimura's training involved a thousand push-ups and nine hours of practice every day. He won the All-Japan Judo Championships, an openweight competition, for three straight years in 1937, 1938, and 1939. He was promoted to 7th dan at age 30, a rank that was frozen after disputes with Kodokan over becoming a professional wrestler, refusing to return the All Japan Judo Championship flag, and issuing dan ranks while in Brazil. Kimura would also win the Emperor's Cup in 1940, the West Japan Judo Championships in 1947, and the All-Japan Judo Championships again in 1949.

Kimura also trained in karate, believing that karate would strengthen his hands. First, he trained what today is known as Shotokan Karate under its founder Gichin Funakoshi for two years, then switched to training Goju-Ryu Karate under So-Nei Chu (a pupil of Goju-Ryu founder Chojun Miyagi) and finally became an assistant instructor, along with Gogen Yamaguchi and Masutatsu Oyama in his dōjō (the latter also going to university together with him and aikido master Gozo Shioda). In his autobiography, Kimura attributes the use of the makiwara (a karate training implement) as taught to him by So Neichu and his friend and training partner Masutatsu Oyama, as being a significant contributor to his consequent tournament success. He began using the makiwara daily prior to his first All Japan success and never lost another competition bout.

== Kimura vs. Hélio Gracie ==
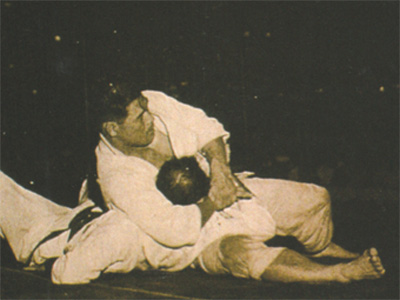
Kimura vs Gracie, with the Japanese holding the Brazilian in a kesa-gatame.

In 1951, after touring Hawaii, Kimura and his troupe formed by judoka Toshio Yamaguchi and Yukio Kato went to Brazil after an invitation by the São Paulo Shimbun. There they were challenged by Hélio Gracie of the Gracie family. Gracie proposed a match under what would be known as the "Gracie Rules", in which throws and pins would not count towards victory, with only submission or loss of consciousness. This played against judo rules in which pins and throws can award someone a victory, but they accepted nonetheless.

Kato was the first to accept the challenge, drawing with Hélio Gracie in their match at the Maracana stadium. However, he lost to Gracie by gi choke in the rematch at the Ibirapuera Park in São Paulo. Hélio proposed to continue with the challenge, and Yamaguchi appointed himself the next to fight. Kimura, however, volunteered to fight in his place.

The bout between Gracie and Kimura took place again in the Maracanã Stadium, before an audience of 20,000 people, including president of Brazil Getúlio Vargas. The expectation was such that, according to a source, Kimura had been warned by the Japanese embassy that he would not be welcomed back in Japan if he lost the match. Kimura was received in the arena with raw eggs and insults by the Brazilian crowds, and the Gracie challengers brought a coffin to symbolize Kimura would be dead, just like they had done with Kato.

At the start of the match, Hélio tried to throw him down with osoto gari and ouchi gari, but Kimura blocked them and scored multiple throws by ouchi gari, harai goshi, uchi mata and ippon seoi nage. However, Helio Gracie was able to perform ukemi thanks to the soft mat used in competitions, so Kimura could not subdue him by throwing alone. The judoka started planning a way to win between throw and throw, and at the second round he took the fight to the ground, pinning Gracie with kuzure-kami-shiho-gatame.

After a number of holds by the Japanese, including kesa-gatame, sankaku-jime and do-jime, the Brazilian looked unable to breathe under Kimura, but he persevered until he tried to switch position by pushing with his arm. At that moment, Kimura seized the limb and executed gyaku-ude-garami. Hélio did not surrender, and Kimura rotated the arm until it broke. As Gracie still refused to give up, Masahiko twisted the arm further and broke it again.

Finally, when the judoka was about to twist it a third time, Gracie's corner threw the towel, and Kimura was declared winner. A crowd of Japanese came and tossed Kimura high in celebration, while doctors treated Hélio's arm. As a tribute to Kimura's victory, the armlock technique he used to defeat Gracie has since been commonly referred to as the Kimura lock, or simply the Kimura, in Brazilian Jiu-Jitsu and, more recently, mixed martial arts circles.

== Professional wrestling career ==
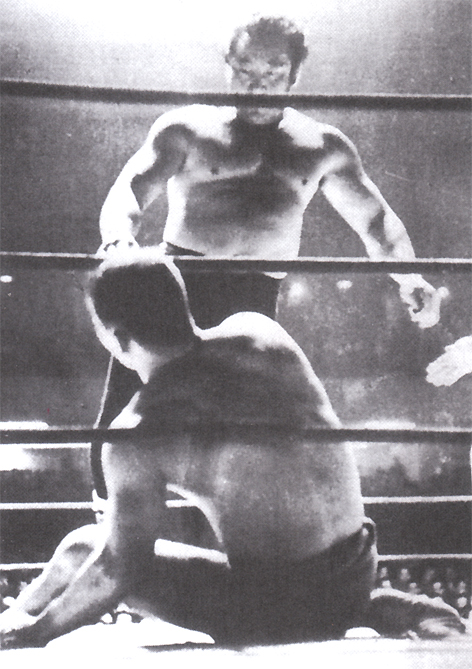
Kimura (back) and Rikidōzan in the controversial 1954 match.

In the early 1950s, Kimura founded Kokusai Pro Wrestling Association. He was also invited by Rikidōzan to compete as a professional wrestler in his Japan Pro Wrestling Association. They performed both as tag team partners and as opponents, but Kimura was not marketed or publicized as much as Rikidōzan. In 1954, their series of matches with the Canadian Sharpe Brothers, who were portraying foreign villains, were the first high-profile pro wrestling matches in Japan and led to a pro wrestling boom.

The Rikidōzan vs. Kimura match on 22 December 1954 for the Japanese Heavyweight Championship was a high-profile match, but, according to Kimura, it didn't go as planned, being one of the earliest examples of a shoot in modern professional wrestling. The match was supposed to go to a draw and set up a series of rematches, but they never happened. During its course, in a spot in which Kimura would let Rikidōzan strike him with a karate chop in the chest, Rikidōzan broke the script and attacked Kimura for real, striking him in the neck instead and using full force. According to the judoka, the chop hit his neck arteries and he was rendered unconscious, while his opponent started to kick him on the ground. Rikidōzan won the match by knockout, and Kimura never received a rematch.

On December 8, 1963, while partying in a Tokyo nightclub, Rikidōzan was stabbed with a urine-soaked blade by gangster Katsushi Murata who belonged to the ninkyō dantai Sumiyoshi-ikka. He died a week later of peritonitis on December 15. Kimura's participation in the incident was suspected, as he is quoted in his autobiography as saying: "I could not forgive his treachery. That night, I received a phone call informing me that several ten yakuza are on their way to Tokyo to kill Rikidozan." However, Japanese author Toshiya Masuda would release in 2011 the book Why Kimura Didn't Kill Rikidozan, in which this theory is dismissed.

Kimura formed the International Pro Wrestling Force (IPWF), a promotion based in his hometown of Kumamoto, as a local affiliate of The Japan Wrestling Association (JWA). Although JWA later took over operations, IPWF is remembered for being the first Japanese promotion to introduce Mexican Lucha Libre wrestlers.

Some biographers note that his professional wrestling career began shortly after his wife was diagnosed with tuberculosis, and it is speculated by some that he began professional wrestling to pay for her medication. Indeed, the predicament was likely beyond the financial means of a police instructor, which was his paying job prior to professional wrestling.

In the Korean film about Rikidozan released in 2004, Kimura is portrayed by Masakatsu Funaki but his surname is written Imura rather than Kimura.

== Kimura vs. Waldemar Santana ==
Kimura went to Brazil again in 1959 to conduct his last professional wrestling tour, and he was challenged by Waldemar Santana to a "real" (not choreographed) submission match. Santana, a champion in jiu-jitsu and capoeira managed by Carlson Gracie, was 27 years old, 6 feet tall, and weighed 205 lb, 40 lbs more than Masahiko, and had knocked out Hélio Gracie in a fight lasting more than three hours. Carlson and Santana declared they were not afraid of Kimura, which Kimura answered by letting the press witness his training sessions at Academia Cinelândia, where he allowed partners to try to choke him and smiled while they failed. The Gracie side proposed a grappling match followed by a rematch under vale tudo rules ten days later, with Kimura accepting both. A match against Carlson was also suggested, but the latter declined due to a hand injury.

The first match was placed on July 1 at Maracanãzinho stadium, and it was fought in judogis and four ten-minute rounds. Expectation was low, as Santana was expected not to be a match for Kimura. Indeed, Santana fought through the match with what newspapers described as a defensive strategy, at one point trying to throw himself and Kimura out of the ring, although he scored one solid takedown at one point. Nonetheless, the judoka threw Santana with seoi nage, hane goshi and osoto gari, and finally applied his famous gyaku-ude-garami. Newspaper Correio da Manha described the match as a "cat and mouse affair", while Diario de Noite stated "Kimura won at will".

The second, on the other hand, attracted much more interest, as Santana was a veteran of vale tudo competition while Kimura was not. Hosted on July 12 at Antônio Balbino arena, it would pit Santana against Kimura, who was in poor physical condition due to illness, as registered in Diario de Noite and Kimura's own autobiography. According to the latter, promoters supposedly threatened the judoka with police presence in order to compel him to fight against his doctor's orders. The two fighters started trading punches and kicks, but the capoeirista soon showed his superiority on this field, damaging Masahiko with high kicks and open-handed strikes. The judoka headbutted him in the abdomen and took him down, where he punished Santana with elbow strikes and more headbutts. Waldemar escaped, however, and answered with another headbutt from the clinch against the ropes. Kimura tried to execute ippon seoi nage, but he slipped and fell to the ground, where Santana started striking him with punches and headbutts through his guard. Eventually, the judoka caught the Brazilian in the momentum of a headbutt and broke his nose with a punch from the bottom. The competitors, both tired and bleeding, disengaged and returned to standing, where they continued exchanging strikes until the clock marked the end of the match.

== Death ==
Kimura died on April 18, 1993, after suffering from lung cancer. He was 75 years old.

== Achievements ==
- All-Japan Collegiate Championships (1935)
- 1936 Takudai Kosen Judo Championship
- 7th All-Japan Judo Championships (1937)
- 8th All Japan Judo Championship (1938)
- 9th All Japan Judo Championship (1939)
- Ten-Ran Shiai tournament (1940)
- 1947 West Japan Judo Championship
- 1949 All Japan Judo Championship (drew with Takahiko Ishikawa)

== See also ==
- Takushoku University
- Armlock

== Sources ==
- Jim Chen M.D. Masahiko Kimura Biography
- Masahiko Kimura (1984) Excerpt from My Judo
- Hélio Gracie recalls the famous challenge match against Kimura - interviewed in 1994 by Nishi Yoshinori from Kakutou Striking Spirit
- Attack The Back The Kimura – A History & Techniques
