= Koichiro Mitani =

Japanese judoka

Medal record

Representing Japan

Men's Judo

Asian Championships
Gold medal – first place	1993 Macau	+95 kg

East Asian Games
Gold medal – first place	1993 Shanghai	Open

Koichiro Mitani (三谷 浩一郎, Mitani Kōichirō; born 18 November 1968) is a retired Japanese judoka.

Mitani is from Fukuyama, Hiroshima and began judo at the age of a first grader. He belonged to Japan Highway Public Corporation after graduation from Kinki University in 1991.

Mitani was good at Ippon seoi nage, Osotogari and Uchi mata sukashi.

In 1993, he won a gold medal at the Asian Championships held in Macau and at the East Asian Games held in Shanghai. He also participated in the All-Japan Championships 9 times from 1990 to 2000.

After retirement, Mitani coached judo at Japan Highway Public Corporation and All-Japan Youth Team.

== Achievements ==
- 1990 - All-Japan Championships (Openweight only) 3rd

- All-Japan Selected Championships (+95 kg) 3rd
- World University Championships (Openweight) 1st
- All-Japan University Championships (+95 kg) 3rd

- 1991 - Pacific Rim Championships (Openweight) 1st
- 1992 - All-Japan Championships (Openweight only) 3rd

- All-Japan Businessgroup Championships (+95 kg) 2nd

- 1993 - Asian Championships (+95 kg) 1st

- East Asian Games (Openweight) 1st
- Paris Super World Cup (Openweight) 1st

- 1994 - Kodokan Cup (+95 kg) 2nd
- 1995 - All-Japan Businessgroup Championships (+95 kg) 3rd
- 1996 - Jigoro Kano Cup (Openweight) 2nd

- All-Japan Championships (Openweight only) 2nd

- 1999 - All-Japan Championships (Openweight only) 3rd
