= Patrick Burris =

American Olympic judoka

Patrick Matsugi Burris
- Born: December 28, 1950 (age 75); Alea, Hawaii
- Style: Judo
- Team: US Olympic Team
- Teacher: Patrick Burris (father)
- Trainer: Shag Okada
- Wrestling: NCAA Wrestling
- Years active: 1958–present

Other information
- Occupation: Sensei
- University: Northern Colorado
- Notable students: Ron Tripp
- Notable school: USA Stars
- Last updated on: August 15, 2016

Patrick Mitsugi Burris (born December 28, 1950) is a retired competitive judoka who represented the United States at the 1972 Summer Olympic Games in Munich and the 1976 Summer Olympic Games in Montreal. He won the bronze medal at the 1975 Pan American Games in Mexico City in the men's lightweight division at 70 kg. Burris is a five time US national senior AAU champion, including an unprecedented four straight championships. He was named 1976 US national Grand Champion (best in all weight classes) – the lightest Grand Champion ever.

Burris was a standout in both wrestling and judo as a youth at Rancho Alamitos High School in Garden Grove, California, where he won a bronze medal in the Southern California Interscholastic Federation Wrestling finals. He demonstrated his potential in judo when he won his first national championship as a sophomore. He went on to attend Santa Ana Junior College where, in the 1969–1970 wrestling season, he compiled a 36–1 record before winning the California State Junior College championship at 150 lbs. In judo, he won the 1968 National Junior judo championship at 150 lbs and the Southern Pacific AAU championship at 139 lbs and 150 lbs in 1968 and 1969. He placed third in the US Men's National Tournament in 1969. Burris transferred to the University of Northern Colorado (UNC) in Greeley where he became a two-time Rocky Mountain Athletic Conference champion wrestling for the Bears at 150 lbs in 1971 and 1972. He graduated from UNC with a bachelor's degree in education in 1972.

In April 1972, less than two months after participating in the NCAA College Division wrestling tournament in Oswego, New York, Burris won the US National Senior Men's Judo championship in Philadelphia by throwing a previous US national champion, Paul Maruyama, something that had never been done. This earned him the right to represent the United States Olympic judo team that year.

Shortly after the 1976 Summer Olympics, Burris returned to northern Colorado and began his coaching career at Fort Lupton High School when he was named Head Wrestling Coach in late August. After moving to Oklahoma in 1985, he coached Ron Tripp to a 1994 world heavyweight championship in sambo. He also coached the men's 1996 judo team in the 1996 Summer Olympic Games in Atlanta where Jimmy Pedro won a bronze medal at 71 kg. Multiple Olympians and United States National Champions have been successful under Sensei Pat's tutelage.

Burris currently owns a Dojo in Moore, Oklahoma named USA Stars which also has a branch in Virginia Beach.

He was promoted to the judo rank of kudan (9th degree black belt) in November 2021 by USA Judo.
