= Park Ji-yeong (judoka) =

South Korean judoka (born 1971)

Personal information
- Born: 6 June 1971 (age 55)
- Occupation: Judoka

Sport
- Country: South Korea
- Sport: Judo
- Weight class: –‍66 kg

Achievements and titles
- Olympic Games: (bronze) (1988)
- World Champ.: 5th (1991)
- Asian Champ.: (silver) (1988)
Medal record
Women's judo
Representing South Korea
Olympic Games
Bronze medal – third place	1988 Seoul	‍–‍66 kg
Asian Games
Bronze medal – third place	1990 Beijing	‍–‍66 kg
Asian Championships
Silver medal – second place	1988 Damascus	‍–‍66 kg

Profile at external databases
- IJF: 53854
- JudoInside.com: 3729
- Updated on 18 June 2023

Park Ji-yeong (born 6 June 1971) is a South Korean judoka. She competed in the women's middleweight event at the 1992 Summer Olympics.
