= Leng Chunhui =

Chinese judoka (born 1972)

Personal information
- Born: 3 July 1972 (age 54) Jinzhou, Liaoning, China
- Occupation: Judoka

Sport
- Country: China
- Sport: Judo
- Weight class: ‍–‍66 kg, ‍–‍72 kg

Achievements and titles
- Olympic Games: 9th (1992)
- World Champ.: (gold) (1993)
- Asian Champ.: (silver) (1991, 1994)
Medal record
Women's judo
Representing China
World Championships
Gold medal – first place	1993 Hamilton	‍–‍72 kg
Asian Games
Silver medal – second place	1994 Hiroshima	‍–‍72 kg
Asian Championships
Silver medal – second place	1991 Osaka	‍–‍72 kg

Profile at external databases
- IJF: 11439
- JudoInside.com: 10178
- Updated on 9 May 2024

Leng Chunhui (Chinese: 冷 春慧, born 3 July 1972) is a Chinese judoka. She won the women's - 72 kg at the 1993 World Judo Championships and a silver medal in the same weight class at the 1994 Asian Games. She also competed at the 1992 and 1996 Summer Olympics, finishing tied for ninth and tied for 15th, respectively.
