= Helena Miagian Papilaya =

Indonesian judoka

Personal information
- Nationality: Indonesian
- Born: 16 April 1962 (age 62)

Sport
- Sport: Judo

Helena Miagian Papilaya (born 16 April 1962) is an Indonesian former judoka. She competed in the women's middleweight event at the 1992 Summer Olympics.
