= Tatsukuma Ushijima =

Japanese judoka

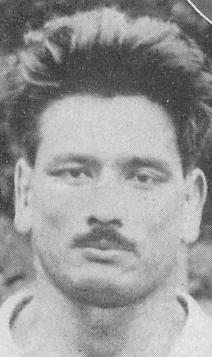

Personal information
- Nationality: Japanese
- Born: March 10, 1904
- Died: May 26, 1985 (aged 81)
- Occupation: Judoka

Sport
- Sport: Judo

Tatsukuma Ushijima (牛島辰熊, March 10, 1904 – May 26, 1985) was a Japanese judoka and former All-Japan judo champion. he was also known as a teacher of Masahiko Kimura, a famous judoka. His nickname was "The Demon Ushijima".

== Biography ==
=== Early career ===
He was born in Kumamoto, Kumamoto Prefecture, Japan, a son of refiners family. After training in Kyushin-ryū jujutsu during his childhood, he began judo at the age of 15.

Ushijima won both the second and third All-Japan judo championships. He retired from competition in 1934 following a harsh bout of clonorchiasis and a string of losses.

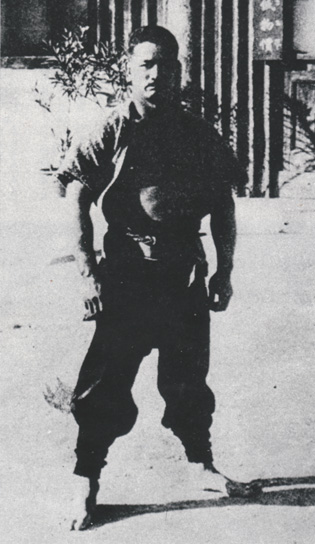
Ushujima in shuai jiao attire in 1941.

=== China ===
In the 1940s, Ushijima visited Beijing and competed in the local style of shuai jiao. He fought first against famed practitioner Zhang Hongyu in a mixed match, hosted under shuai jiao rules but wearing judogi, in three consecutive rounds. Ushijima won quickly the first round, throwing Hongyu with his superior grips, but in the second, after Hongyu evaded him with circling and feints, Ushujima overcommitted and was thrown. In the third and final, Hongyu captured the fatigued Ushijima's back and held onto him, ultimately throwing him with a double leg takedown from behind.

=== Later life ===
In 1944, he attempted to assassinate Hideki Tojo, a general and the leader of the Empire of Japan, but it failed. He was arrested by the Military Police (Kempeitai).

He was founder of the International Judo Association in 1950.
