= Laisa Laveti Tuifagalele =

Fijian judoka

Personal information
- Nationality: Fijian
- Born: 27 August 1967 (age 57)

Sport
- Sport: Judo

Laisa Laveti Tuifagalele (born 27 August 1967) is a Fijian judoka. She competed at the 1992 Summer Olympics and the 2000 Summer Olympics.
