= Laura Martinel =

Argentinian judoka

Personal information
- Full name: Laura Alejandra Martinel Acuña
- Born: 20 December 1963 (age 62)
- Occupation: Judoka

Sport
- Country: Argentina
- Sport: Judo
- Weight class: –66 kg, –72 kg
- Rank: 8th dan black belt

Achievements and titles
- Olympic Games: 7th (1992)
- World Champ.: R32 (1993)
- Pan American Champ.: (1982)
Medal record
Women's judo
Representing Argentina
Pan American Games
Silver medal – second place	1991 Havana	–66 kg
Pan American Championships
Gold medal – first place	1982 Santiago	–72 kg
Silver medal – second place	1992 Ontario	–66 kg
Bronze medal – third place	1982 Santiago	Open
Bronze medal – third place	1988 Buenos Aires	–66 kg

Profile at external databases
- IJF: 12127
- JudoInside.com: 9622
- Updated on 10 March 2023

Laura Alejandra Martinel Acuña (born 20 December 1963) is a retired female judoka from Argentina. She claimed the silver medal in the Women's Middleweight (–66 kg) division at the 1991 Pan American Games in Havana, Cuba. Martinel represented her native South American country at the 1992 Summer Olympics in Barcelona, Spain, where she was defeated in the repechage round by France's Claire Lecat.
