= Grace Jividen =

American judoka (born 1964)

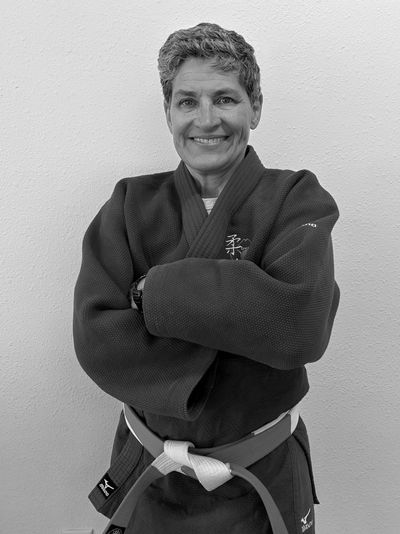
- Jividen in 2015

Personal information
- Full name: Grace Jividen-Truesdale
- Nationality: American
- Born: June 12, 1964 (age 62) Buffalo, New York
- Occupation: Judo Instructor
- Weight: 142 lb (64 kg; 10.1 st)

Sport
- Rank: 7th degree black belt in Judo
- Club: Gracie Judo Club
Medal record
Women's Judo
Representing the United States
FISU World University Championships
Silver medal – second place	1984 FISU World University Championships
World Police and Fire Games
Gold medal – first place	2001 United States
Bronze medal – third place	2011 United States
Silver medal – second place	2015 United States
US Olympic Festival
Bronze medal – third place	1981
Silver medal – second place	1983
Silver medal – second place	1985
Gold medal – first place	1986
Gold medal – first place	1989
Gold medal – first place	1990
Gold medal – first place	1994

Grace Jividen (born June 12, 1964) is a retired American judoka who competed in the 1992 Summer Olympics.

== Early life ==
Jividen was born in Buffalo, New York and grew up in Dayton, Ohio. She began practicing judo at the age of three. As a child, she remembers watching her two older brothers compete and had a desire to compete as well.

Jividen attended Webster University, M.A.1991, where she obtained a degree in Procurement & Logistics Management.

== Competition ==
Jividen first competed at a national level in 1978. She made the US National Team in 1981 at the US Olympic Festival, where she received a bronze medal. She would go on to compete in the 1992 Summer Olympics, the first year female judoka were awarded medals. She tied for 7th place with Laura Martinel. Jividen was also an alternate in the 1996, 2000, and 2004 Olympics.

== Personal life ==
Jividen resides in Littleton, Colorado, where she owns and operates Gracie Judo Club. The club teaches both children and adults, and focuses specifically on physical development, character development, competition techniques, and self-defense.
