= Hiroko Ishikawa =

Japanese judoka (born 1971)

Medal record

Women's Judo

Representing Japan

Asian Championships
Silver medal – second place	1988 Damascus	-61 kg
Bronze medal – third place	1991 Osaka	-61 kg

East Asian Games
Silver medal – second place	1993 Shanghai	-61 kg

Hiroko Ishikawa (石川 弘子, Ishikawa Hiroko, born Hiroko Kitazume (北爪 弘子, Kitazume Hiroko) on 8 September 1971) is a retired Japanese judoka.

Ishikawa was born in Akabori, Gunma and began judo at the age of 12. She entered The Asahi Bank, Ltd after graduating from Saitama University in 1994. She excelled at Seoi nage and Ippon seoi nage.

She won the medals in the Asian Championships in 1988 and 1991. In 1997, Ishikawa participated in the World Championships held in Paris but was defeated by Séverine Vandenhende in the second round and Jung Sung-Sook in the consolation round. She retired after the Championships.

Ishikawa had coached judo at the Shukutoku Junior Highschool from 1996 to 2005. As of 2010, she don't have a relation with judo and lives in Ichihara, Chiba with her family.

== Achievements ==
- 1988 - Asian Championships (-61 kg) 2nd

- Kodokan Cup (-61 kg) 1st
- All-Japan High School Championships (-61 kg) 1st

- 1989 - All-Japan Selected Championships (-61 kg) 3rd

- All-Japan High School Championships (-61 kg) 1st

- 1990 - Kodokan Cup (-61 kg) 1st
- 1991 - Asian Championships (-61 kg) 2nd

- Fukuoka International Women's Championships (-61 kg) 1st
- All-Japan Selected Championships (-61 kg) 2nd
- All-Japan University Championships (-61 kg) 1st

- 1992 - Fukuoka International Women's Championships (-61 kg) 2nd

- All-Japan University Championships (-61 kg) 2nd

- 1993 - East Asian Games (-61 kg) 2nd

- Fukuoka International Women's Championships (-61 kg) 3rd
- All-Japan Selected Championships (-61 kg) 1st
- All-Japan University Championships (-61 kg) 1st

- 1994 - All-Japan Selected Championships (-61 kg) 2nd

- All-Japan Businessgroup Championships (-61 kg) 2nd

- 1995 - Fukuoka International Women's Championships (-61 kg) 3rd

- Kodokan Cup (-61 kg) 1st
- All-Japan Selected Championships (-61 kg) 3rd
- All-Japan Businessgroup Championships (-61 kg) 3rd

- 1996 - Fukuoka International Women's Championships (-61 kg) 3rd

- Kodokan Cup (-61 kg) 1st
- All-Japan Selected Championships (-61 kg) 2nd

- 1997 - World Championships (-61 kg) 7th

- Tournoi Super World Cup Paris (-61 kg) 1st
- All-Japan Selected Championships (-61 kg) 2nd
