= Mithiani =

Mithiani مٺياڻي مٹہیانی
- Rural
- Location within Sindh Location within Pakistan
- Coordinates: 26°52′06″N 67°58′53″E
- Country: Pakistan
- Province: Sindh
- District: Naushahro Feroze
- Tehsil: Naushehro Feroze
- Division: Shaheed Benazirabad
- Elevation: 32 m (105 ft)

Population (2023)
  - Total: 31,936
- Time zone: UTC+5 (PST)
- Calling code: 24

Mithiani (Sindhi: مٺياڻي), (Urdu: مٹہیانی) is a town in the Naushahro Feroze District, of Sindh, Pakistan. It is 15 km west of Naushahro Feroze City, according to 2017 censes of Pakistan it had a population of 97,734. There used to be a railway service in Mithiani which connected Mithiani with rest of Sindh. railway station, which is now defunct. Mithiani is situated on the right bank of River Indus, the town is protected by a massive bund against high flooding in the River Indus, which was constructed in 1920. Mithiani is connected to every major city and town of Sindh and Pakistan.

== History ==
According to Sindh Gazetteer 1876, Mithiani was a small village. The population consists of 986 souls, majority were Muslims and Hindus being in minority. It had 302 houses and 66 shops. The main commodity was grain and cloth. Owing to its strategic position on the Indus River, Mithiani was a transit point for import and export from Afghanistan to Rajputana. Small ferries would load goods from Mithiani to Paat Sharif, a historic town on left bank, in Dadu district During the British era, the local Hindu community opened first English medium school in the first half of the 20th century as they were more open to secular education than Muslim population, who were more inclined toward religious education. This school was part of the series of schools launched by Bhiria Education society, under the patronage of BES. Before that, students from entire Naushahro Feroze District would travel to far away cities of Hyderabad and Karachi for quality education, even train service was limited to cargo, so they would travel on boat from Mithiani to Hyderabad.

== Name of Mithiani ==
Mithiani was founded in the times of Kalhora dynasty. Mithiani's name is reported to be named after Saiyed Mitha Shah.

== Linguistics ==
Sindhi is the primary language of the town, understood universally. Seraiki is the second most spoken language of Mithiani. Most people are multilingual can speak Sindhi and Urdu, in addition to Seraiki. Other languages include Balochi, Brohui, Bagri, Punjabi and to little extent Pushto. The town of Mithiani is also home to hundreds of immigrants from India during the period of partition. Majority of them (Rajputs) speak Rangri dialect (Haryanvi).

== Economy ==
Agriculture remains the major source of the economic activity in the town. Wheat, Sugarcane, Seseme seeds and lentils are the main crops grown in Mithiani town. wheat is exported to Punjab and Karachi. Besides agriculture, service sector is increasingly growing day by day. In olden days, people would go to Naushahro Feroze or Moro for shopping but now every possible daily life items are available in Mithiani, from clothes to household utensils. Today, Mithiani is a busy and bustling town. UBL bank is the only banking service in the town.

== Education ==
Mithiani Town holds one Government Boys High School, one Government Girls High School, One Model School and 3 Primary Schools. Some schools up to eighth and matriculation also exist in private sectors in the town. However, there is no institution for higher education therefore boys as well as girls are sent to other neighbouring cities to get certification onward matriculation.

=== Government Elementary College (Men) Mithiani ===
Teachers Training College was established during 1882 to promote Sindhi language as well as train newly teachers. Demonstration hall of the institute was constructed during 1893. Later, the college was given status of elementary college and qualification for JST and PST were provided to the youngsters and newly recruited primary or junior school teachers. Main Hostel to provide accommodation to the students coming from other cities and other main buildings of the college were constructed during 1979. During 1999, status of Government Elementary College Mithiani was upgraded after got registered and approved from HEC. Curriculum of the College was also changed and students clearing from the college is being given degrees equal to bachelor in education and teachings as ADE (two years curriculum) and B.Ed (Hons) (four years curriculum).

=== Government Boys High School Mithiani ===
The school is located in the far west side of Mithiani town. The school building's shape is like the F letter of the English alphabet. The school is the only centre in the area where the examination of board is held annually. Government Boys High School Mithiani was affiliated with the Sukkur Board since long period of time till 2019. It is now affiliated with the Board of Intermediate and Secondary Education Nawabshah. The school keeps a well-educated and experienced faculty members.

=== GSP Bright Elementary School Mithiani ===
The private school is registered up to 8th class. The official language of the school is English but Sindhi language is also being focused rigorously.

== Notable people ==
- Pathan Khan Mastoi
- Asif Mithyanvi
- Barkat Malik
- Capt:Dr Gullam Sarwar Mastoi
- Syed Bachal Shah
- Gohar Ali Mallah
- Ali Nawaz Mastoi
- Comrade Sohail Mastoi
- Molvi Meer Muhammad Chandio
- Siraai Niaz Ali Mashori
- Soomar Khan Depar
- Gul Bhatti Poet
- Historian Gullam Muhammad Pahnwer
- Hakeem Botrabi (dalipota near mithiani)
- Jabbar Ahmed Sheikh

== Bibliography ==
- Bahria Foundation College Naushahro Feroze
- Provincial Assembly of Sindh
