= Margaret Ushijima =

American lawyer from Hawaii

Margaret Ushijima (born Margaret Shizue Kunishige; October 6, 1927 – 2013) was a lawyer from Hawaii, United States of America.

== Biography ==
Ushijima was born in Laupahoehoe. She completed a bachelor's degree in social science followed by a master's degree in social work at Smith College in 1952.

In 1963 Ushijima became a dean of students at the University of Hawaiʻi at Hilo. On her retirement in 1980, she enrolled at the University of Hawaiʻi at Mānoa's William S. Richardson School of Law and completed a law degree, graduating in 1983. She then joined her husband in the family law firm, Ushijima & Ushijima. She retired from law in 2003.

In the 1970s, Ushijima campaigned throughout the islands to educate people on the importance of the proposed Equal Rights Amendment.
