= Rosicléia Campos =

Brazilian judoka

Personal information
- Born: 7 November 1969 (age 56) Rio de Janeiro, Brazil

Sport
- Sport: Judo

Rosicléia Campos (born 7 November 1969) is a Brazilian judoka. She competed at the 1992 Summer Olympics and the 1996 Summer Olympics.
