= Ryoko Fujimoto =

Japanese judoka (born 1966)

Personal information
- Nationality: Japanese
- Born: 18 April 1966 (age 59); Kurashiki, Japan

Sport
- Sport: Judo

Ryoko Fujimoto (born 18 April 1966) is a Japanese judoka. She competed in the women's middleweight event at the 1992 Summer Olympics.
