= Jun Konno =

Japanese judoka (born 1967)

Personal information
- Born: 20 March 1967 (age 59)
- Occupation: Judoka

Sport
- Sport: Judo
Medal record
Representing Japan
Men's Judo
Asian Games
Gold medal – first place	1994 Hiroshima	+95 kg
Asian Championships
Gold medal – first place	1991 Osaka	Open
Gold medal – first place	1993 Macau	Open
Gold medal – first place	1997 Manila	+95 kg

Profile at external databases
- JudoInside.com: 2895

Jun Konno (金野 潤, Konno Jun; born 20 March 1967) is a Japanese judoka. He is four times Asian champion and also won All-Japan Judo Championships in 1994 and 1997.

== Career ==
He is from Saitama Prefecture and began judo at the age of a seventh grader. After graduation from Nihon University, He belonged to Sohgo Security Services. He was long time before retiring itself from the high school days, a rival of Naoya Ogawa.

Konno also well known that he and Hidehiko Yoshida quarrelled at the final of All-Japan Championships in 1994, for Konno's dangerous skills like Kanibasami and Joint lock (Movie).

As of 2010, Konno coaches judo at his alma mater, Nihon University.

== Achievements ==
- 1986 - World Junior Championships (+95 kg) 2nd

- All-Japan Junior Championships (+95 kg) 2nd
- All-Japan University Championships (+95 kg) 2nd

- 1987 - All-Japan University Championships (+95 kg) 2nd
- 1989 - Pacific Rim Championships (+95 kg) 1st
- 1990 - Jigoro Kano Cup (Openweight) 2nd

- All-Japan Championships (Openweight only) 3rd
- All-Japan Selected Championships (+95 kg) 3rd

- 1991 - Asian Championships (Openweight) 1st

- All-Japan Championships (Openweight only) 2nd
- All-Japan Selected Championships (+95 kg) 3rd

- 1993 - Asian Championships (Openweight) 1st

- All-Japan Championships (Openweight only) 2nd
- All-Japan Selected Championships (+95 kg) 3rd

- 1994 - Asian Games (+95 kg) 1st

- All-Japan Championships (Openweight only) 1st

- 1995 - Kodokan Cup (+95 kg) 2nd
- 1996 - All-Japan Championships (Openweight only) 5th
- 1997 - Asian Championships (+95 kg) 1st

- All-Japan Championships (Openweight only) 1st

- 1998 - All-Japan Championships (Openweight only) 5th

- Kodokan Cup (+100 kg) 1st

- 1999 - Jigoro Kano Cup (+100 kg) 7th

- All-Japan Championships (Openweight only) Loss

- 2000 - All-Japan Selected Championships (+100 kg) 3rd
