= Alexandra Schreiber =

German judoka

Personal information
- Nationality: German
- Born: 13 April 1963 (age 62) Regensburg, West Germany

Sport
- Sport: Judo

Alexandra Schreiber (born 13 April 1963) is a German former judoka. She competed in the women's middleweight event at the 1992 Summer Olympics.
