= Odalis Revé =

Cuban judoka (born 1970)

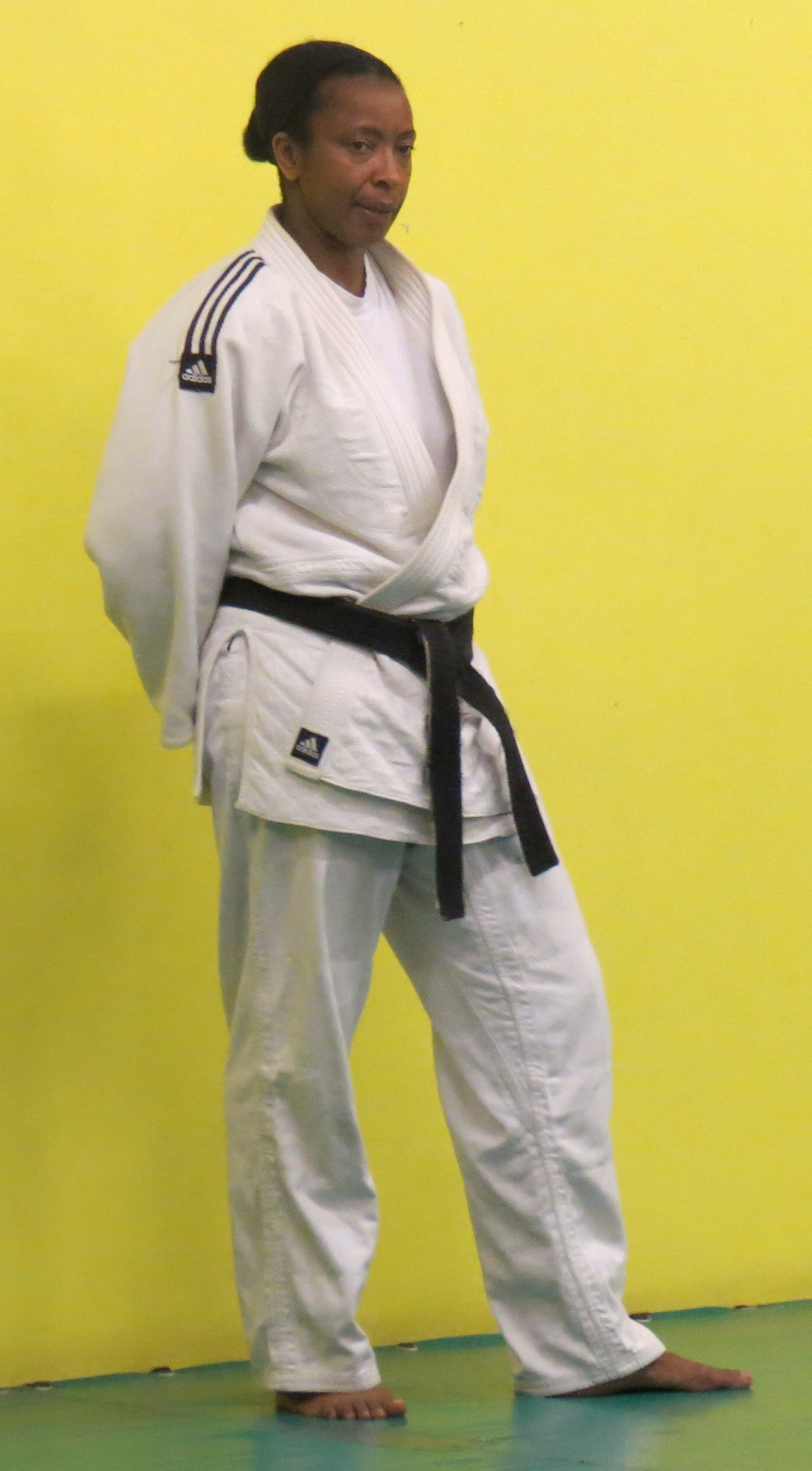
- Odalis Revé in 2013

Personal information
- Born: 15 January 1970 (age 56) Holguín
- Occupation: Judoka

Sport
- Country: Cuba
- Sport: Judo
- Weight class: –‍66 kg

Achievements and titles
- Olympic Games: (gold) (1992)
- World Champ.: (silver) (1991, 1995)
- Pan American Champ.: (gold) (1988, 1990, 1992, 1994)
Medal record
Women's judo
Representing Cuba
Olympic Games
Gold medal – first place	1992 Barcelona	‍–‍66 kg
World Championships
Silver medal – second place	1991 Barcelona	‍–‍66 kg
Silver medal – second place	1995 Chiba	‍–‍66 kg
Bronze medal – third place	1989 Belgrade	‍–‍66 kg
Bronze medal – third place	1993 Hamilton	‍–‍66 kg
Pan American Games
Gold medal – first place	1991 Havana	‍–‍66 kg
Gold medal – first place	1995 Mara del Plata	‍–‍66 kg
Pan American Championships
Gold medal – first place	1988 Buenos Aires	‍–‍66 kg
Gold medal – first place	1990 Caracas	‍–‍66 kg
Gold medal – first place	1992 Ontario	‍–‍66 kg
Gold medal – first place	1994 Santiago	‍–‍66 kg

Profile at external databases
- IJF: 53347
- JudoInside.com: 985
- Updated on 5 June 2023

Odalis Revé Jiménez (born 15 January 1970 in Holguín) is a Cuban retired judoka. At the 1992 Summer Olympics she won the gold medal in the Women's Middleweight (‍–‍66 kg) category.
