= Yelena Kotelnikova =

Russian judoka (born 1969)

Personal information
- Nationality: Russian
- Born: 29 December 1969 (age 56)

Sport
- Sport: Judo

Yelena Kotelnikova (born 29 September 1969) is a Russian judoka. She competed at the 1992 Summer Olympics and the 1996 Summer Olympics.
