= All-Japan Judo Championships =

Judo competition

- Current event or competition: 2025 All-Japan Judo Championships
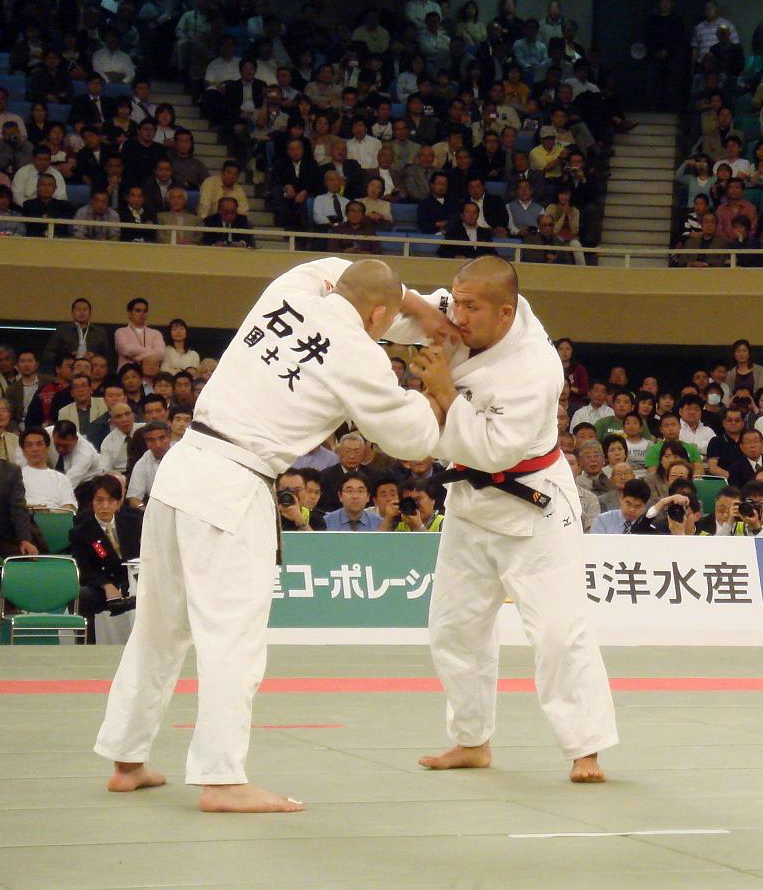
- Men's final in 2007 Satoshi Ishii (left) vs Keiji Suzuki (right)

Competition details
- Discipline: Judo
- Type: Judo, annual
- Organiser: All Japan Judo Federation

History
- First edition: 1930 in Nippon Budokan, Japan
- Editions: 87 (2017)
- Most wins: Yasuhiro Yamashita : 9 titles

The All-Japan judo championships (全日本柔道選手権大会, Zennihon jūdō senshuken taikai) is a judo tournament held every year in Japan. The men's tournament is held in Nippon Budokan on 29 April and the women's tournament (dubbed "Empress cup All-Japan women's Judo championships") is held in Yokohama Cultural Gymnasium in April. The Kodokan and All Japan Judo Federation sponsor the championship.

This tournament has only one open-weight division. Weight distinction is held as All-Japan Selected Judo Championships (全日本選抜柔道体重別選手権大会, Zennihon senbatsu jūdō taijūbetsu senshuken taikai) and Kodokan Cup (講道館杯, Kōdōkan hai) particularly.

To Japanese judoka, it is one of the three major judo competitions, next to the judo events at the Summer Olympic Games and World Championships. Since 2011 All Japan Judo Championship is fought with International rules.

== Records ==
=== Men ===
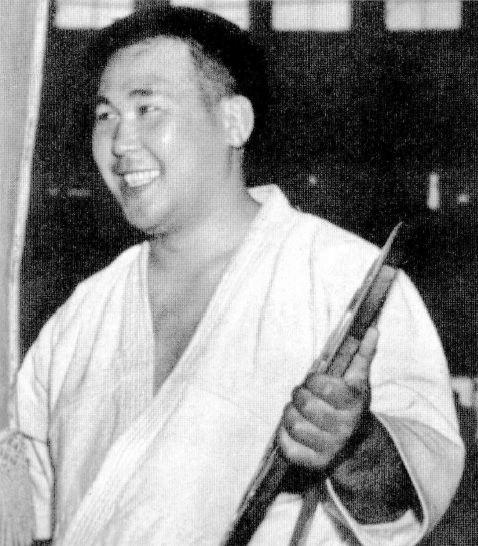
Yoshihiko Yoshimatsu, achieved championship of the third own in 1955

- Most titles
  - Yasuhiro Yamashita : 9 titles
  - Naoya Ogawa : 7 titles
  - Masahiko Kimura : 4 titles
  - Keiji Suzuki : 4 titles
- Most Participation
  - Yasuyuki Muneta : 15 times
  - Katsuyuki Masuchi : 13 times
  - Isamu Sonoda : 12 times
  - Jun Konno : 12 times
  - Naoto Yabu : 12 times
- Youngest champion
  - Satoshi Ishii : Champion at 19 years and 4 months of age in 2006
  - Yasuhiro Yamashita : Champion at 19 years and 10 months of age in 1977
- Lightest champion
  - Isao Okano : 79 kg in 1969 and 80 kg in 1967

=== Women ===
- Most titles
  - Maki Tsukada : 9 titles
  - Yoko Tanabe : 6 titles
  - Noriko Anno : 5 titles
  - Miho Ninomiya : 2 titles
- Youngest champion
  - Sarah Asahina – Champion at 20 years and 8 months of age in 2017

== Recent Winners ==
=== Men ===
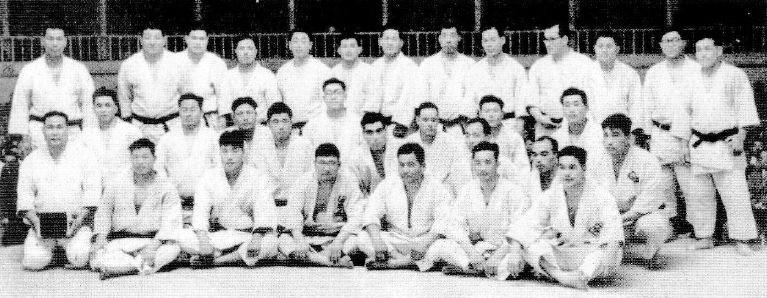
The participants of championship in 1954

- 2026 – Goki Tajima
- 2025 – Daigo Kagawa
- 2024 – Kanta Nakano
- 2023 – Takeshi Ōjitani
- 2022 – Tatsuru Saito
- 2021 – Hyōga Ōta
- 2020 – Ryunosuke Haga
- 2019 – Aaron Wolf
- 2018 – Hisayoshi Harasawa
- 2017 – Takeshi Ōjitani
- 2016 – Takeshi Ōjitani
- 2015 – Hisayoshi Harasawa
- 2014 – Takeshi Ōjitani
- 2013 – Takamasa Anai
- 2012 – Hirotaka Kato
- 2011 – Keiji Suzuki
- 2010 – Kazuhiko Takahashi
- 2009 – Takamasa Anai
- 2008 – Satoshi Ishii
- 2007 – Keiji Suzuki
- 2006 – Satoshi Ishii

=== Women ===
- 2026 – Seiko Watanabe
- 2025 – Reina Tanaka
- 2024 – Maya Segawa
- 2023 – Mami Umeki
- 2022 – Wakaba Tomita
- 2021 – Shiho Tanaka
- 2020 – Wakaba Tomita
- 2019 – Akira Sone
- 2018 – Akira Sone
- 2017 – Sarah Asahina
- 2016 – Kanae Yamabe
- 2015 – Megumi Tachimoto
- 2014 – Kanae Yamabe
- 2013 – Akari Ogata
- 2012 – Kanae Yamabe
- 2011 – Mika Sugimoto
- 2010 – Maki Tsukada
- 2009 – Maki Tsukada
- 2008 – Maki Tsukada
- 2007 – Maki Tsukada
- 2006 – Maki Tsukada
