= Judo at the 2000 Summer Olympics – Men's 90 kg =

Judo competition

Men's 90 kg at the Games of the XXVII Olympiad
- Venue: Sydney Convention and Exhibition Centre
- Date: 20 September 2000
- Competitors: 32 from 32 nations

Medalists
1st place, gold medalist(s)		Mark Huizinga	Netherlands
2nd place, silver medalist(s)		Carlos Honorato	Brazil
3rd place, bronze medalist(s)		Frédéric Demontfaucon	France
3rd place, bronze medalist(s)		Ruslan Mashurenko	Ukraine

Men's 90 kg competition in judo at the 2000 Summer Olympics was held on 20 September at the Sydney Convention and Exhibition Centre.

This event was the third-heaviest of the men's judo weight classes, limiting competitors to a maximum of 90 kilograms of body mass. Like all other judo events, bouts lasted five minutes. If the bout was still tied at the end, it was extended for another five-minute, sudden-death period; if neither judoka scored during that period, the match is decided by the judges. The tournament bracket consisted of a single-elimination contest culminating in a gold medal match. There was also a repechage to determine the winners of the two bronze medals. Each judoka who had lost to a semifinalist competed in the repechage. The two judokas who lost in the semifinals faced the winner of the opposite half of the bracket's repechage in bronze medal bouts.

== Schedule ==
All times are Australian Eastern Daylight Time (UTC+11:00)

Date	Time	Round
Wednesday, 20 September 2000	15:00; 20:30	Preliminaries & Repechage; Final

== Tournament results ==
=== Final ===
Final
1	Mark Huizinga (NED)	1010
2	Carlos Honorato (BRA)	0000

=== Mat 1 ===
Round of 32
Dmitri Morozov (RUS)	1001
Georgi Gugava (GEO)	0001
Adrian Croitoru (ROM)	0001
Vicbart Geraldino (DOM)	0001
Marko Spittka (GER)	0001
Brian Olson (USA)	0010
Yosvany Despaigne (CUB)	0100
Mark Huizinga (NED)	1011
Gabriel Lama (CHI)	0011
Rasul Salimov (AZE)	0011
Robert Ivers (AUS)	0000
Keith Morgan (CAN)	0010
Victor Florescu (MDA)	0000
Jean Claude Raphael (MRI)	1000
Batjargalyn Odkhüü (MGL)	0001
Xu Zhiming (CHN)	1000

Round of 16
Dmitri Morozov (RUS)	0000
Adrian Croitoru (ROM)	1001
Brian Olson (USA)	0100
Mark Huizinga (NED)	1001
Rasul Salimov (AZE)	0000
Keith Morgan (CAN)	1000
Jean Claude Raphael (MRI)	1100
Xu Zhiming (CHN)	0000

Quarterfinals
Adrian Croitoru (ROM)	0000
Mark Huizinga (NED)	0001
Keith Morgan (CAN)	1000
Jean Claude Raphael (MRI)	0000

Semifinals
Mark Huizinga (NED)	1000
Keith Morgan (CAN)	0000

=== Mat 2 ===
Round of 32
Michele Monti (ITA)	0100
Eduardo Costa (ARG)	1010
Yoo Sung-yeon (KOR)	1001
Kamol Muradov (UZB)	0001
Frédéric Demontfaucon (FRA)	0110
Ruslan Mashurenko (UKR)	0010
Luis René López (VEN)	0011
Carlos Santiago (PUR)	1001
Hidehiko Yoshida (JPN)	0012
Sergey Shakimov (KAZ)	0002
Iskander Hachicha (TUN)	0010
Khaled Meddah (ALG)	0001
Lee Chih-feng (TPE)	0000
Fernando González (ESP)	0201
Carlos Honorato (BRA)	1020
Krisna Bayu (INA)	0001

Round of 16
Eduardo Costa (ARG)	1021
Yoo Sung-yeon (KOR)	0100
Frédéric Demontfaucon (FRA)	0020
Carlos Santiago (PUR)	0001
Hidehiko Yoshida (JPN)	1010
Iskander Hachicha (TUN)	0010
Fernando González (ESP)	0010
Carlos Honorato (BRA)	0100

Quarterfinals
Eduardo Costa (ARG)	0000
Frédéric Demontfaucon (FRA)	1000
Hidehiko Yoshida (JPN)	0000
Carlos Honorato (BRA)	1000

Semifinals
Frédéric Demontfaucon (FRA)	0001
Carlos Honorato (BRA)	0131

=== Repechage ===
The losing semifinalists as well as those judoka eliminated in earlier rounds by the four semifinalists of the main bracket advanced to the repechage. These matches determined the two bronze medalists for the event.

First round
Yosvany Despaigne (CUB)	0000
Brian Olson (USA)	1001
Robert Ivers (AUS)	0000
Rasul Salimov (AZE)	1000
Ruslan Mashurenko (UKR)	1000
Carlos Santiago (PUR)	0000
Krisna Bayu (INA)	0100
Fernando González (ESP)	1001

Second round
Brian Olson (USA)	1000
Adrian Croitoru (ROM)	0001
Rasul Salimov (AZE)	1010
Jean Claude Raphael (MRI)	0101
Ruslan Mashurenko (UKR)	1000
Eduardo Costa (ARG)	0001
Fernando González (ESP)	WO
Hidehiko Yoshida (JPN)

Third round
Brian Olson (USA)	0101
Rasul Salimov (AZE)	0101
Ruslan Mashurenko (UKR)	1000
Fernando González (ESP)	0000

Bronze medal finals
Rasul Salimov (AZE)	0000
Frédéric Demontfaucon (FRA)	1002
Ruslan Mashurenko (UKR)	1001
Keith Morgan (CAN)	0000
