= Judo at the 2004 Summer Olympics – Men's 90 kg =

Judo competition

Men's 90 kg at the Games of the XXVIII Olympiad
- Venue: Ano Liossia Olympic Hall
- Dates: 18 August 2004
- Competitors: 32 from 32 nations
- Winning score: 1001

Medalists
1st place, gold medalist(s)		Zurab Zviadauri	Georgia
2nd place, silver medalist(s)		Hiroshi Izumi	Japan
3rd place, bronze medalist(s)		Mark Huizinga	Netherlands
3rd place, bronze medalist(s)		Khasanbi Taov	Russia

Men's 90 kg competition in judo at the 2004 Summer Olympics was held on August 18 at the Ano Liossia Olympic Hall.

This event was the third-heaviest of the men's judo weight classes, limiting competitors to a maximum of 90 kilograms of body mass. Like all other judo events, bouts lasted five minutes. If the bout was still tied at the end, it was extended for another five-minute, sudden-death period; if neither judoka scored during that period, the match is decided by the judges. The tournament bracket consisted of a single-elimination contest culminating in a gold medal match. There was also a repechage to determine the winners of the two bronze medals. Each judoka who had lost to a semifinalist competed in the repechage. The two judokas who lost in the semifinals faced the winner of the opposite half of the bracket's repechage in bronze medal bouts.

== Schedule ==
All times are Greece Standard Time (UTC+2)

Date	Time	Round
Wednesday, 18 August 2004	10:30; 13:00; 17:00	Preliminaries; Repechage; Final

== Qualifying athletes ==
Mat	Athlete	Country
1	Carlos Honorato	Brazil
1	Khaled Meddah	Algeria
1	Krisna Bayu	Indonesia
1	Tsend-Ayuushiin Ochirbat	Mongolia
1	Daniel Kelly	Australia
1	Winston Gordon	Great Britain
1	Toni Besolí	Andorra
1	Vicbart Geraldino	Dominican Republic
1	José Goldschmied	Mexico
1	Frédéric Demontfaucon	France
1	Gabriel Lama	Chile
1	Brian Olson	United States
1	Zurab Zviadauri	Georgia
1	Francesco Lepre	Italy
1	Khasanbi Taov	Russia
1	Yosvany Despaigne	Cuba
2	Valentyn Grekov	Ukraine
2	David Alarza	Spain
2	José Gregorio Camacho	Venezuela
2	Eduardo Costa	Argentina
2	Siarhei Kukharenka	Belarus
2	Hiroshi Izumi	Japan
2	Dionysios Iliadis	Greece
2	Vyacheslav Pereteyko	Uzbekistan
2	Hwang Hee-tae	South Korea
2	Przemysław Matyjaszek	Poland
2	Gerhard Dempf	Germany
2	Mark Huizinga	Netherlands
2	Abbas Fallah	Iran
2	Keith Morgan	Canada
2	Hesham Mesbah	Egypt
2	Rostand Melaping	Cameroon

== Tournament results ==
=== Final ===
Final
1	Zurab Zviadauri (GEO)	1001
2	Hiroshi Izumi (JPN)	0000

=== Mat 1 ===
Round of 32
Carlos Honorato (BRA)	1000
Khaled Meddah (ALG)	0000
Krisna Bayu (INA)	0001
Tsend-Ayuushiin Ochirbat (MGL)	0101
Daniel Kelly (AUS)	0000
Winston Gordon (GBR)	1100
Toni Besolí (AND)	0000
Vicbart Geraldino (DOM)	1000
José Goldschmied (MEX)	0000
Frédéric Demontfaucon (FRA)	1010
Gabriel Lama (CHI)	0001
Brian Olson (USA)	0120
Zurab Zviadauri (GEO)	1000
Francesco Lepre (ITA)	0000
Khasanbi Taov (RUS)	0011
Yosvany Despaigne (CUB)	0001

Round of 16
Carlos Honorato (BRA)	0101
Tsend-Ayuushiin Ochirbat (MGL)	0100
Winston Gordon (GBR)	1000
Vicbart Geraldino (DOM)	0001
Frédéric Demontfaucon (FRA)	1000
Brian Olson (USA)	0000
Zurab Zviadauri (GEO)	1001
Khasanbi Taov (RUS)	0001

Quarterfinals
Carlos Honorato (BRA)	0010
Winston Gordon (GBR)	0012
Frédéric Demontfaucon (FRA)	0000
Zurab Zviadauri (GEO)	0010

Semifinals
Winston Gordon (GBR)	0020
Zurab Zviadauri (GEO)	1000

=== Mat 2 ===
Round of 32
Valentyn Grekov (UKR)	0111
David Alarza (ESP)	0010
José Gregorio Camacho (VEN)	0000
Eduardo Costa (ARG)	1101
Siarhei Kukharenka (BLR)	0000
Hiroshi Izumi (JPN)	1000
Dionysios Iliadis (GRE)	1000
Vyacheslav Pereteyko (UZB)	0000
Hwang Hee-tae (KOR)	1000
Przemysław Matyjaszek (POL)	0000
Gerhard Dempf (GER)	0000
Mark Huizinga (NED)	1000
Abbas Fallah (IRI)	0111
Keith Morgan (CAN)	1002
Hesham Mesbah (EGY)	0100
Rostand Melaping (CMR)	0000

Round of 16
Valentyn Grekov (UKR)	0001
Eduardo Costa (ARG)	0112
Hiroshi Izumi (JPN)	1010
Dionysios Iliadis (GRE)	0010
Hwang Hee-tae (KOR)	0001
Mark Huizinga (NED)	0000
Keith Morgan (CAN)	0011
Hesham Mesbah (EGY)	0001

Quarterfinals
Eduardo Costa (ARG)	0000
Hiroshi Izumi (JPN)	0001
Hwang Hee-tae (KOR)	0200
Keith Morgan (CAN)	0000

Semifinals
Hiroshi Izumi (JPN)	0101
Hwang Hee-tae (KOR)	0001

=== Repechage ===
Those judoka eliminated in earlier rounds by the four semifinalists of the main bracket advanced to the repechage. These matches determined the two bronze medalists for the event.

First round
Daniel Kelly (AUS)	1010
Vicbart Geraldino (DOM)	0000
Francesco Lepre (ITA)	0000
Khasanbi Taov (RUS)	1001
Siarhei Kukharenka (BLR)	1021
Dionysios Iliadis (GRE)	0000
Przemysław Matyjaszek (POL)	0001
Mark Huizinga (NED)	0021

Second round
Carlos Honorato (BRA)	0010
Daniel Kelly (AUS)	0011
Frédéric Demontfaucon (FRA)	0020
Khasanbi Taov (RUS)	0100
Eduardo Costa (ARG)	1000
Siarhei Kukharenka (BLR)	0100
Keith Morgan (CAN)	0000
Mark Huizinga (NED)	1012

Third round
Daniel Kelly (AUS)	0001
Khasanbi Taov (RUS)	0100
Eduardo Costa (ARG)	0000
Mark Huizinga (NED)	1010

Bronze medal finals
Hwang Hee-tae (KOR)	0000
Khasanbi Taov (RUS)	1010
Winston Gordon (GBR)	0000
Mark Huizinga (NED)	1001
