= Judo at the 1996 Summer Olympics – Men's 86 kg =

Judo competition

Men's 86 kg at the Games of the XXVI Olympiad
- Venue: Georgia World Congress Center
- Date: 22 July 1996
- Competitors: 33 from 33 nations

Medalists
1st place, gold medalist(s)		Jeon Ki-Young	South Korea
2nd place, silver medalist(s)		Armen Bagdasarov	Uzbekistan
3rd place, bronze medalist(s)		Marko Spittka	Germany
3rd place, bronze medalist(s)		Mark Huizinga	Netherlands

These are the results of the Men's 86 kg (also known as Middleweight) competition in judo at the 1996 Summer Olympics in Atlanta, Georgia. A total of 33 men competed in this event, limited to jūdōka whose body weight was less than, or equal to, 86 kilograms. Competition took place in the Georgia World Congress Center.

== Tournament results ==
=== First round ===
As there were more than 32 qualifiers for the tournament, three first round matches were held to reduce the field to 32 judoka.

- Nicolas Gill (CAN) defeated Rodolfo Cano (GUA)
- Ao Tegen (CHN) defeated Marek Pisula (POL)

=== Main bracket ===
The gold and silver medalists were determined by the final match of the main single-elimination bracket.

1st Round
Maltsev (RUS)	W
Ao (CHN)	L
Celestin (HAI)	L
Bagdasarov (UZB)	W
Olson (USA)	W
Wu (TPE)	L
Merkevicius (LTU)	W
Lacina (CZE)	L
Yoshida (JPN)	L
Croitoru (ROU)	W
Mashurenko (UKR)	W
Murray (AHO)	L
Klischin (AUT)	L
Wilkinson (AUS)	W
Birch (GBR)	L
Yandzi (FRA)	W
Alimzhanov (KAZ)	L
Spittka (GER)	W
Tsmindashvili (GEO)	L
Zanol (BRA)	W
Gill (CAN)	W
Ndenguet (COD)	L
Bayu (INA)	L
Villar (ESP)	W
Elisii (ARG)	W
Kaaba (MAR)	L
Hachicha (TUN)	L
Despaigne (CUB)	W
Jeon (KOR)	W
Huizinga (NED)	L
L
Biwole Abolo (CMR)	W

2nd Round
Maltsev (RUS)	L
Bagdasarov (UZB)	W
Olson (USA)	L
Merkevicius (LTU)	W
Croitoru (ROU)	W
Mashurenko (UKR)	L
Wilkinson (AUS)	L
Yandzi (FRA)	W
Spittka (GER)	W
Branco Zanol (BRA)	L
Gill (CAN)	W
Villar (ESP)	L
Elisii (ARG)	L
Despaigne (CUB)	W
Jeon (KOR)	W
Biwole Abolo (CMR)	L

Quarterfinals
Bagdasarov (UZB)	W
Merkevicius (LTU)	L
Croitoru (ROU)	W
Yandzi (FRA)	L
Spittka (GER)	W
Gill (CAN)	L
Despaigne (CUB)	L
Jeon (KOR)'	LW

Semifinals
Bagdasarov (UZB)	W
Croitoru (ROU)	L
Spittka (GER)	L
Jeon (KOR)'	W

Gold medal final
Bagdasarov (UZB)	L
Jeon (KOR)	W

=== Repechage ===
The losing semifinalists as well as those judoka eliminated in earlier rounds by the four semifinalists of the main bracket advanced to the repechage. These matches determined the two bronze medalists for the event.

First round
Celestin (HAI)	L
Maltsev (RUS)	W
Yoshida (JPN)	W
Mashurenko (UKR)	L
Alimzhanov (KAZ)	LL
Branco Zanol (BRA)	W
Huizinga (NED)	W
Biwole Abolo (CMR)	L

Second round
Merkevicius (LTU)	L
Maltsev (RUS)	W
Yandzi (FRA)	L
Yoshida (JPN)	W
Gill (CAN)	W
Branco Zanol (BRA)	L
Despaigne (CUB)	L
Huizinga (NED)	W

Third round
Maltsev (RUS)	L
Yoshida (JPN)	W
Gill (CAN)	L
Huizinga (NED)	W

Bronze medal finals
Spittka (GER)	W
Yoshida (JPN)	L
Croitoru (ROU)	L
Huizinga (NED)	W
