= Gabriel Lama =

Chilean judoka (born 1974)

Personal information
- Full name: Gabriel Eduardo Lama Valenzuela
- Nationality: Chile
- Born: 2 March 1974 (age 52) Santiago, Chile
- Height: 1.80 m (5 ft 11 in)
- Weight: 90 kg (198 lb)

Sport
- Sport: Judo
- Event: 90 kg
Medal record
Men's judo
Representing Chile
South American Games
Bronze medal – third place	2002 Rio de Janeiro	90 kg

Gabriel Eduardo Lama Valenzuela (born March 2, 1974, in Santiago) is a Chilean judoka, who competed in the men's middleweight category. He picked up a total of twelve medals in his career, including a bronze from the 2002 South American Games in Rio de Janeiro, Brazil, and represented his nation Chile in the 90-kg class in two editions of the Olympic Games (2000 and 2004).

Lama participated in the 2000 Summer Olympics in Sydney, where he competed in the men's 90-kg division. In his opening match, Lama conceded with a chui penalty and succumbed to yuko from Azerbaijan's Rasul Salimov at the end of the five-minute bout.

At the 2004 Summer Olympics in Athens, Lama qualified as a lone judoka for his second Chilean squad in the men's middleweight class (90 kg), by placing seventh and granting a berth from the World Championships in Osaka, Japan. Lama failed to improve his feat from the previous Games, as he received two penalties for passivity and fell in an inner-thigh throw (uchi mata) and a waza-ari defeat from U.S. judoka Brian Olson at the closure of their five-minute, first round match.
