= Batjargalyn Odkhüü =

Mongolian judoka (born 1977)

Personal information
- Full name: Batjargalyn Odkhüü
- Nationality: Mongolia
- Born: 11 March 1977 (age 49) Bayankhutag, Khentii, Mongolia
- Height: 1.95 m (6 ft 5 in)
- Weight: 90 kg (198 lb)

Sport
- Sport: Judo
- Event: 100 kg
Medal record
Men's judo
Representing Mongolia
Asian Championships
Bronze medal – third place	2003 Jeju City	100 kg

Batjargalyn Odkhüü (Mongolian: Батжаргалын Одхүү; born March 11, 1977, in Bayankhutag, Khentii) is a Mongolian judoka, who competed in the men's half-heavyweight category. He won a bronze medal in the 100-kg division at the 2003 Asian Judo Championships in Jeju City, South Korea, and represented his nation Mongolia in two editions of the Olympic Games (2000 and 2004).

Batjargal made his official debut at the 2000 Summer Olympics in Sydney, where he competed in the men's middleweight class (90 kg). He lost his opening match to neighboring China's Xu Zhiming, who successfully scored an ippon and threw him down the tatami with a seoi nage (shoulder throw) at two minutes and six seconds.

At the 2004 Summer Olympics in Athens, Batjargal qualified for his second Mongolian squad in the men's half-heavyweight class (100 kg), by coming fifth and receiving a berth from the Asian Championships in Almaty, Kazakhstan. Batjargal failed to edge past the first round after losing out in a fifty-five-second match by an ippon defeat and an inner thigh throw (uchi mata) to Georgia's Iveri Jikurauli.
