= Tsend-Ayuushiin Ochirbat =

Mongolian judoka (born 1974)

Personal information
- Full name: Tsend-Ayuushiin Ochirbat
- Nationality: Mongolia
- Born: 19 November 1974 (age 51) Ulaanbaatar, Mongolia
- Occupation: Judoka
- Height: 1.79 m (5 ft 10 1/2 in)
- Weight: 81 kg (179 lb)

Sport
- Sport: Judo
- Event: 90 kg
Medal record
Men's judo
Representing Mongolia
Asian Games
Silver medal – second place	2002 Busan	90 kg
Asian Championships
Bronze medal – third place	2000 Osaka	81 kg
Bronze medal – third place	2001 Ulaanbaatar	90 kg
Bronze medal – third place	2003 Jeju City	90 kg

Profile at external databases
- JudoInside.com: 3130

Tsend-Ayuushiin Ochirbat (Mongolian: Цэнд-Аюушийн Очирбат; born November 19, 1974, in Ulaanbaatar) is a Mongolian judoka, who competed in the men's middleweight category. He held the 2005 Mongolian senior title in his own division, picked up a total of six medals in his career, including a silver from the 2002 Asian Games in Busan, South Korea, and represented his nation Mongolia in two editions of the Olympic Games (2000 and 2004).

Ochirbat made his official debut at the 2000 Summer Olympics in Sydney, where he competed in the men's light-middleweight class (81 kg). He outlasted Burkina Faso's Salifou Koucka Ouiminga and Morocco's Adil Belgaïd in the prelims, before losing out the third match by a single leg takedown (kuchiki taoshi) and an ippon to Uruguay's Alvaro Paseyro.

When South Korea hosted the 2002 Asian Games in Busan, Ochirbat came up strong by chance for his first career gold medal in the 81-kg division, but had to satisfy with the silver after falling to Japan's Yuta Yazaki in the final match.

At the 2004 Summer Olympics in Athens, Ochirbat qualified for his second Mongolian squad in the men's middleweight class (90 kg), based on the nation's entry to the top 22 world rankings for his own category by the International Judo Federation. Ochirbat opened his match with a more satisfying victory over Indonesia's three-time Olympic veteran Krisna Bayu, before he received three penalties for passivity and fell behind in a 0–1 koka score against Brazilian judoka and 2000 Olympic bronze medalist Carlos Honorato at the end of the second round.
