= Vyacheslav Pereteyko =

Uzbekistani judoka (born 1980)

Personal information
- Full name: Vyacheslav Pereteyko
- Nationality: Uzbekistan
- Born: 19 December 1980 (age 45) Tashkent, Uzbek SSR, Soviet Union
- Height: 1.87 m (6 ft 1 1/2 in)
- Weight: 90 kg (198 lb)

Sport
- Sport: Judo
- Event: 90 kg
Medal record
Men's judo
Representing Uzbekistan
Asian Games
Bronze medal – third place	2002 Busan	90 kg
Asian Championships
Silver medal – second place	2004 Almaty	90 kg
Bronze medal – third place	2003 Jeju City	90 kg

Vyacheslav Pereteyko (Uzbek: Вячеслав Перетейко; born December 19, 1980, in Tashkent) is an Uzbek judoka, who competed in the men's middleweight category. He picked up a bronze medal in the 90-kg division at the 2002 Asian Games in Busan, South Korea, and represented his nation Uzbekistan at the 2004 Summer Olympics.

Pereteyko made sporting headlines at the 2002 Asian Games in Busan, South Korea, where he overpowered China's Teng Guangying with a brilliant ippon victory to grab the bronze medal in the 90-kg division.

At the 2004 Summer Olympics in Athens, Pereteyko qualified for the Uzbek squad in the men's middleweight class (90 kg), by placing second and receiving a berth from the Asian Championships in Almaty, Kazakhstan. By the mighty commotion of the home crowd inside Ano Liossia Hall to favor their opponent Dionysios Iliadis, Pereteyko failed to apply pressure on his opponent, and thereby lost his opening match by an ippon and a kouchi gari (small inner reap) within two minutes.
