= Gerhard Dempf =

German judoka (born 1979)

Personal information
- Full name: Gerhard Dempf
- Nationality: Germany
- Born: 24 January 1979 (age 47) Schwabmünchen, Bavaria, West Germany
- Height: 1.95 m (6 ft 5 in)
- Weight: 90 kg (198 lb)

Sport
- Sport: Judo
- Event: 90 kg
- Club: TSV München-Großhadern
- Coached by: Ralf Matusche

Gerhard Dempf (born 24 January 1979 in Schwabmünchen, Bavaria) is a German judoka who competed in the men's middleweight category. He has achieved four top-three finishes from the German senior trials in his own division, picked up a total of thirteen medals in his career, and represented Germany in the 90-kg class at the 2004 Summer Olympics. Throughout most of his sporting career, Dempf trained as a full-fledged member of the judo squad for Munich and Großhadern Gymnastics and Sports Club (German: Turnund Sportverein München-Großhadern) in Munich under his personal coach and sensei Ralf Matusche.

Dempf has been selected to the German squad in the men's middleweight class (90 kg) at the 2004 Summer Olympics in Athens, based on the nation's entry to the top 22 for his own division in the world rankings by the International Judo Federation. He lost his opening match to Dutch judoka and defending Olympic champion Mark Huizinga, who successfully scored an ippon and edged him off the tatami by an uchi mata (inner thigh) throw within fifty-seven seconds.
