= Lee Chih-feng =

Taiwanese judoka

Personal information
- Nationality: Taiwanese
- Born: 11 April 1980 (age 44)

Sport
- Sport: Judo

Lee Chih-feng (born 11 April 1980) is a Taiwanese judoka. He competed in the men's middleweight event at the 2000 Summer Olympics.
