= Siarhei Kukharenka =

Belarusian judoka (born 1976)

Personal information
- Born: 8 May 1976 (age 50)
- Occupation: Judoka

Sport
- Country: Belarus
- Sport: Judo
- Weight class: –90 kg

Achievements and titles
- Olympic Games: 9th (2004)
- World Champ.: (bronze) (2003)
- European Champ.: (silver) (2002)
Medal record
Men's judo
Representing Belarus
World Championships
Bronze medal – third place	2003 Osaka	–90 kg
European Championships
Silver medal – second place	2002 Maribor	–90 kg
European Junior Championships
Bronze medal – third place	1995 Valladolid	–78 kg

Profile at external databases
- IJF: 18392
- JudoInside.com: 6499
- Updated on 19 November 2022

Siarhei Kukharenka (born 8 May 1976) is a Belarusian judoka.

== Achievements ==
Year	Tournament	Place	Weight class
2003	World Judo Championships	3rd	Middleweight (90 kg)
2003	European Judo Championships	5th	Middleweight (90 kg)
2002	European Judo Championships	2nd	Middleweight (90 kg)
1999	European Judo Championships	7th	Half middleweight (81 kg)
1996	European Judo Championships	5th	Half middleweight (78 kg)
