= Somoza Celestin =

Haitian judoka

Personal information
- Nationality: Haitian
- Born: 7 January 1973 (age 52)

Sport
- Sport: Judo

Somoza Celestin (born 7 January 1973) is a Haitian judoka. He competed in the men's middleweight event at the 1996 Summer Olympics.
