= Khasanbi Taov =

Russian judoka (born 1977)

Personal information
- Born: 5 November 1977 (age 49) Kabardino-Balkaria, Russia
- Occupation: Judoka

Sport
- Country: Russia
- Sport: Judo
- Weight class: ‍–‍90 kg

Achievements and titles
- Olympic Games: (bronze) (2004)
- World Champ.: 7th (2005)
- European Champ.: (silver) (2003)
Medal record
Men's judo
Representing Russia
Olympic Games
Bronze medal – third place	2004 Athens	‍–‍90 kg
European Championships
Silver medal – second place	2003 Düsseldorf	‍–‍90 kg
Bronze medal – third place	2004 Bucharest	‍–‍90 kg

Profile at external databases
- IJF: 1955
- JudoInside.com: 3387
- Updated on 30 May 2023

Khasanbi Taov (Russian: Хасанби Таов; born 5 November 1977) is a Russian judoka.

Taov won a bronze medal in the middleweight (90 kg) division at the 2004 Summer Olympics.

== Achievements ==
Year	Tournament	Place	Weight class
2005	World Judo Championships	7th	Middleweight (90 kg)
2004	Olympic Games	3rd	Middleweight (90 kg)
2004	European Judo Championships	3rd	Middleweight (90 kg)
2003	European Judo Championships	2nd	Middleweight (90 kg)
2001	European Judo Championships	5th	Middleweight (90 kg)
