= 2003 Asian Judo Championships =

Judo competition

The 2003 Asian Judo Championships were held in Jeju, South Korea from 31 October to 1 November 2003.

== Medal summary ==
=== Men ===
Event	Gold	Silver	Bronze
Extra lightweight −60 kg	Khashbaataryn Tsagaanbaatar; Mongolia	Sanjar Zokirov; Uzbekistan	Tatsuaki Egusa; Japan
Extra lightweight −60 kg	Khashbaataryn Tsagaanbaatar; Mongolia	Sanjar Zokirov; Uzbekistan	Akram Shah; India
Half lightweight −66 kg	Jung Bu-kyung; South Korea	Gantömöriin Dashdavaa; Mongolia	Yerlan Slyambayev; Kazakhstan
Half lightweight −66 kg	Jung Bu-kyung; South Korea	Gantömöriin Dashdavaa; Mongolia	Yousef Karimian; Iran
Lightweight −73 kg	Lee Won-hee; South Korea	Yusuke Kanamaru; Japan	Damdiny Süldbayar; Mongolia
Lightweight −73 kg	Lee Won-hee; South Korea	Yusuke Kanamaru; Japan	Shokir Muminov; Uzbekistan
Half middleweight −81 kg	Damdinsürengiin Nyamkhüü; Mongolia	Kwon Young-woo; South Korea	Reza Chahkhandagh; Iran
Half middleweight −81 kg	Damdinsürengiin Nyamkhüü; Mongolia	Kwon Young-woo; South Korea	Takashi Ono; Japan
Middleweight −90 kg	Yuta Yazaki; Japan	Choi Sun-ho; South Korea	Tsend-Ayuushiin Ochirbat; Mongolia
Middleweight −90 kg	Yuta Yazaki; Japan	Choi Sun-ho; South Korea	Vyacheslav Pereteyko; Uzbekistan
Half heavyweight −100 kg	Askhat Zhitkeyev; Kazakhstan	Jang Sung-ho; South Korea	Takeo Shoji; Japan
Half heavyweight −100 kg	Askhat Zhitkeyev; Kazakhstan	Jang Sung-ho; South Korea	Batjargalyn Odkhüü; Mongolia
Heavyweight +100 kg	Abdullo Tangriev; Uzbekistan	Kota Ueguchi; Japan	Kim Sung-bum; South Korea
Heavyweight +100 kg	Abdullo Tangriev; Uzbekistan	Kota Ueguchi; Japan	Yeldos Ikhsangaliyev; Kazakhstan
Openweight	Daisuke Mori; Japan	Choi Young-hwan; South Korea	Mahmoud Miran; Iran
Openweight	Daisuke Mori; Japan	Choi Young-hwan; South Korea	Yeldos Ikhsangaliyev; Kazakhstan

=== Women ===
Event	Gold	Silver	Bronze
Extra lightweight −48 kg	Kim Young-ran; South Korea	Kayo Kitada; Japan	Gao Lijuan; China
Extra lightweight −48 kg	Kim Young-ran; South Korea	Kayo Kitada; Japan	Zinura Djuraeva; Uzbekistan
Half lightweight −52 kg	Kim Kyung-ok; South Korea	Aiko Sato; Japan	Angom Anita Chanu; India
Half lightweight −52 kg	Kim Kyung-ok; South Korea	Aiko Sato; Japan	Li Ying; China
Lightweight −57 kg	Kie Kusakabe; Japan	Khishigbatyn Erdenet-Od; Mongolia	Jung Hye-mi; South Korea
Lightweight −57 kg	Kie Kusakabe; Japan	Khishigbatyn Erdenet-Od; Mongolia	Yang Hsien-tzu; Chinese Taipei
Half middleweight −63 kg	Yoshie Ueno; Japan	Lee Bok-hee; South Korea	Wang Chin-fang; Chinese Taipei
Half middleweight −63 kg	Yoshie Ueno; Japan	Lee Bok-hee; South Korea	Tan Fafang; China
Middleweight −70 kg	Hitomi Kaiyama; Japan	Bae Eun-hye; South Korea	Liu Shu-yun; Chinese Taipei
Middleweight −70 kg	Hitomi Kaiyama; Japan	Bae Eun-hye; South Korea	Wang Juan; China
Half heavyweight −78 kg	Mizuho Matsuzaki; Japan	Varvara Masyagina; Kazakhstan	Dorjgotovyn Tserenkhand; Mongolia
Half heavyweight −78 kg	Mizuho Matsuzaki; Japan	Varvara Masyagina; Kazakhstan	Lee So-yeon; South Korea
Heavyweight +78 kg	Liu Huanyuan; China	Choi Sook-ie; South Korea	Erdene-Ochiryn Dolgormaa; Mongolia
Heavyweight +78 kg	Liu Huanyuan; China	Choi Sook-ie; South Korea	Miyuki Tokuda; Japan
Openweight	Jia Xueying; China	Kei Eguchi; Japan	Lee Hsiao-hung; Chinese Taipei
Openweight	Jia Xueying; China	Kei Eguchi; Japan	Erdene-Ochiryn Dolgormaa; Mongolia

== Medal table ==
Rank	Nation	Gold	Silver	Bronze	Total
1	Japan	6	5	4	15
2	South Korea	4	7	3	14
3	Mongolia	2	2	6	10
4	China	2	0	4	6
5	Kazakhstan	1	1	3	5
5	Uzbekistan	1	1	3	5
7	Chinese Taipei	0	0	4	4
8	Iran	0	0	3	3
9	India	0	0	2	2
Totals (9 entries)		16	16	32	64
