= Rodolfo Cano =

Guatemalan judoka

Personal information
- Nationality: Guatemalan
- Born: 18 June 1965 (age 61)

Sport
- Sport: Judo

Rodolfo Cano (born 18 June 1965) is a Guatemalan judoka. He competed in the men's middleweight event at the 1996 Summer Olympics.

== 1996 Summer Olympics ==
Event	Elimination	Final ranking
Event	Opponent	Place
Men's 86 kg	Canada Nicolas Gill (CAN); L	32nd
