= Ouiminga =

Ouiminga is a surname. Notable people with the surname include:

- Mariama Ouiminga (born 1970), Burkinabé sprinter
- Salifou Koucka Ouiminga (born 1977), Burkinabé judoka
