= Robert Ivers (judoka) =

Australian judoka

Personal information
- Nationality: Australian
- Born: 25 April 1969 (age 55)

Sport
- Sport: Judo

Robert Ivers (born 25 April 1969) is an Australian judoka. He competed in the men's middleweight event at the 2000 Summer Olympics.
