= Pablo Elisii =

Argentine judoka (born 1971)

Personal information
- Born: 14 October 1971 (age 54) Ituzaingó, Buenos Aires, Argentina

Sport
- Sport: Judo
Medal record
Representing Argentina
Pan American Games
Bronze medal – third place	1995 Mar del Plata	Middleweight

Pablo Elisii (born 14 October 1971) is an Argentine judoka. He competed in the men's middleweight event at the 1996 Summer Olympics.
