= Toni Besolí =

Andorran Olympic judoka

Personal information
- Full name: Antoni Besolí Cervellera
- Nickname: Toni
- Nationality: Andorra
- Born: 19 May 1976 (age 50) Andorra la Vella, Andorra
- Occupation: Judoka
- Height: 1.89 m (6 ft 2 1/2 in)
- Weight: 90 kg (198 lb)

Sport
- Sport: Judo
- Event: 90 kg

Profile at external databases
- JudoInside.com: 8911

Antoni "Toni" Besolí Cervellera (born 19 May 1976 in Andorra la Vella) is an Andorran judoka, who competed in the men's middleweight category.

Besoli qualified as a lone judoka for the Andorran squad in the men's middleweight class (90 kg) at the 2004 Summer Olympics in Athens, by granting a tripartite invitation from the International Judo Federation. He fell in a bodily-crushing ippon defeat to Dominican Republic's two-time Olympian Vicbart Geraldino just forty-seven seconds into their opening match.
