= Judo at the 2002 Asian Games – Men's 90 kg =

Judo competition

Men's 90 kg at the 2002 Asian Games
- Venue: Gudeok Gymnasium
- Date: 1 October 2002
- Competitors: 12 from 12 nations

Medalists
gold medal	Yuta Yazaki	Japan
silver medal	Tsend-Ayuushiin Ochirbat	Mongolia
bronze medal	Vyacheslav Pereteyko	Uzbekistan
bronze medal	Park Sung-keun	South Korea

The men's 90 kilograms (Middleweight) competition at the 2002 Asian Games in Busan was held on 1 October at the Gudeok Gymnasium.

== Schedule ==
All times are Korea Standard Time (UTC+09:00)

Date	Time	Event
Tuesday, 1 October 2002	14:00	1 round
Tuesday, 1 October 2002	14:00	2 round
Tuesday, 1 October 2002	14:00	Repechage 1 round
Tuesday, 1 October 2002	14:00	Repechage 2 round
Tuesday, 1 October 2002	14:00	Semifinals
Tuesday, 1 October 2002	18:00	Finals

== Results ==
Legend

- WO — Won by walkover

=== Main bracket ===
1 round
Fong Wing Lun (HKG)	0000
Masoud Khosravinejad (IRI)	1000
Chaminda Gunasekara (SRI)	0000
Tsend-Ayuushiin Ochirbat (MGL)	1000
Teng Guangying (CHN)	1101
Nematjon Khidirov (TJK)	0010
Yuta Yazaki (JPN)	1000
Mussa Zaipulayev (KAZ)	0000

2 round
Masoud Khosravinejad (IRI)	0102
Vyacheslav Pereteyko (UZB)	0030
Aleksandr Gorshkov (KGZ)	0001
Tsend-Ayuushiin Ochirbat (MGL)	1000
Teng Guangying (CHN)	1100
Sidney Schwarzkopf (PHI)	0000
Park Sung-keun (KOR)	0001
Yuta Yazaki (JPN)	0101

Semifinals
Masoud Khosravinejad (IRI)	0001
Tsend-Ayuushiin Ochirbat (MGL)	0120
Teng Guangying (CHN)	0000
Yuta Yazaki (JPN)	1010

Final
Tsend-Ayuushiin Ochirbat (MGL)	0000
Yuta Yazaki (JPN)	1000

=== Repechage ===
Repechage 1 round
Fong Wing Lun (HKG)	0000
Vyacheslav Pereteyko (UZB)	1000
Chaminda Gunasekara (SRI)	0000
Aleksandr Gorshkov (KGZ)	1010
Nematjon Khidirov (TJK)	WO
Sidney Schwarzkopf (PHI)
Mussa Zaipulayev (KAZ)	0020
Park Sung-keun (KOR)	1001

Repechage 2 round
Vyacheslav Pereteyko (UZB)	0201
Aleksandr Gorshkov (KGZ)	0000
Nematjon Khidirov (TJK)	0000
Park Sung-keun (KOR)	1010

Bronze medal match
Vyacheslav Pereteyko (UZB)	1000
Teng Guangying (CHN)	0000
Park Sung-keun (KOR)	0020
Masoud Khosravinejad (IRI)	0001
