= Armen Bagdasarov =

Uzbek-Armenian judoka (born 1972)

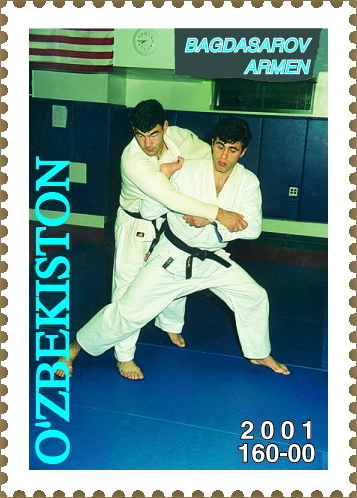
- Armen Bagdasarov (right) on a 2001 Uzbekistani stamp

Personal information
- Full name: Armen Yuryevich Bagdasarov
- Born: 31 July 1972 (age 53) Tashkent, Uzbek SSR
- Occupation: Judoka
- Height: 1.90 m (6 ft 3 in)

Sport
- Country: Uzbekistan
- Sport: Judo
- Weight class: –86 kg, –90 kg, –100 kg
- Rank: 8th dan black belt

Achievements and titles
- Olympic Games: (silver) (1996)
- World Champ.: 5th (1993)
- Asian Champ.: (gold) (1996, 1999)
Medal record
Men's judo
Representing Uzbekistan
Olympic Games
Silver medal – second place	1996 Atlanta	‍–‍86 kg
Asian Games
Silver medal – second place	1998 Bangkok	‍–‍100 kg
Asian Championships
Gold medal – first place	1996 Ho Chi Minh	‍–‍86 kg
Gold medal – first place	1999 Wenzhou	‍–‍90 kg
Bronze medal – third place	1995 New Delhi	‍–‍86 kg
Bronze medal – third place	2000 Osaka	‍–‍100 kg
Summer Universiade
Silver medal – second place	1999 Palma de Mallorca	‍–‍90 kg
Representing CIS
European Junior Championships
Bronze medal – third place	1992 Jerusalem	‍–‍86 kg

Profile at external databases
- IJF: 7446
- JudoInside.com: 8156
- Updated on 4 June 2023

Armen Yuryevich Bagdasarov (Russian: Армен Багдасаров, born 31 July 1972) is an Uzbek-Armenian judoka. He is the first Olympic medalist for independent Uzbekistan.

== Biography ==
Armen Bagdasarov was a member of the Uzbekistan national judo team from 1993 to 2001. The peak of his athletic career began in 1996, when he won a gold medal at the 1996 Asian Judo Championships and won an Olympic silver medal at the 1996 Summer Olympics in Atlanta. He later won a silver medal at the 1998 Asian Games and became a two-time Champion of Asia at the 1999 Asian Judo Championships. Bagdasarov also competed at the 2000 Summer Olympics without success. He also has a World Championship silver medal in kurash. For his sport achievements, Bagdasarov was awarded the title Honored Sportsman of the Republic of Uzbekistan. On the tenth anniversary of the independence of Uzbekistan, a series of stamps honoring athletes were published, one of which is dedicated to the sporting achievements of Armen Bagdasarov.

In 2001, Armen Bagdasarov completed his career and became the head coach of the Uzbekistan national judo team. Later, he headed the National Federation of Sports of Uzbekistan. At the same time, he is the Director of the National High School Sports Skills On Martial Arts. In 2006, he was awarded the honorary title Honored Coach of the Republic of Uzbekistan.
