= Serge Biwole Abolo =

Cameroonian judoka (born 1975)

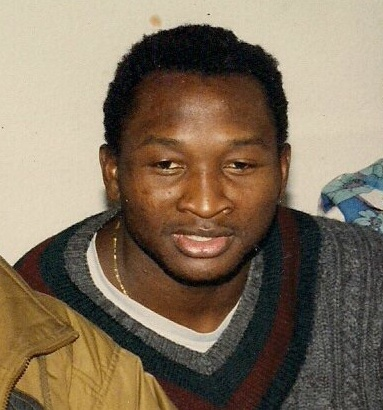
- Serge Biwole Abolo in 2005

Personal information
- Nationality: Cameroonian
- Born: 2 August 1975 (age 50)
- Occupation: Judoka

Sport
- Sport: Judo

Profile at external databases
- JudoInside.com: 3016

Serge Biwole Abolo (born 2 August 1975) is a Cameroonian former judoka. He competed in the men's middleweight event at the 1996 Summer Olympics.
