= Wu Kuo-hui =

Taiwanese judoka

Personal information
- Nationality: Taiwanese
- Born: 19 April 1972 (age 52)

Sport
- Sport: Judo

Wu Kuo-hui (born 19 April 1972) is a Taiwanese judoka. He competed in the men's middleweight event at the 1996 Summer Olympics.
