= Masoud Khosravinejad =

Iranian judoka (born 1980)

Personal information
- Full name: Masoud Khosravinejad
- Nationality: Iran
- Born: 25 March 1980 (age 46) Tehran, Iran
- Height: 1.80 m (5 ft 11 in)
- Weight: 100 kg (220 lb)

Sport
- Sport: Judo
- Event: 100 kg

Masoud Khosravinejad (Persian: مسعود خسروی نژاد; born March 25, 1980, in Tehran) was an Iranian judoka who competed in the men's half-heavyweight category. He finished fifth in the 90-kg division at the 2002 Asian Games in Busan, South Korea, and later represented his nation Iran at the 2004 Summer Olympics.

Khosravinejad has been selected to the Iranian squad in the men's half-heavyweight class (100 kg) at the 2004 Summer Olympics in Athens, based on the nation's entry to the top 22 for his own division in the world rankings by the International Judo Federation. He conceded three shido penalties and succumbed to a waza-ari hold from Russia's Dmitry Maksimov during their opening match.
