= David Wilkinson (judoka) =

Australian judoka

Personal information
- Nationality: Australian
- Born: 6 November 1973 (age 52) Brisbane, Australia

Sport
- Sport: Judo

David Wilkinson (born 6 November 1973) is an Australian judoka. He competed in the men's middleweight event at the 1996 Summer Olympics.
