= Sergey Alimzhanov =

Kazakhstani judoka (born 1966)

Personal information
- Nationality: Kazakhstani
- Born: 27 June 1966 (age 59)

Sport
- Sport: Judo

Sergey Alimzhanov (Сергей Максович Алимжанов, born 27 June 1966) is a Kazakhstani judoka. He competed in the men's middleweight event at the 1996 Summer Olympics.
