= Vicbart Geraldino =

Dominican judoka (born 1978)

Personal information
- Full name: José Vicbart Geraldino Rosello
- Nationality: Dominican Republic
- Born: 13 October 1978 (age 47) Santo Domingo, Dominican; Republic
- Height: 1.85 m (6 ft 1 in)
- Weight: 90 kg (198 lb)

Sport
- Sport: Judo
- Event: 90 kg
Medal record
Men's judo
Representing Dominican Republic
Central American and Caribbean Games
Gold medal – first place	2002 San Salvador	90 kg

José Vicbart Geraldino Rosello (born October 13, 1978, in Santo Domingo) is a judoka from the Dominican Republic, who competed in the men's middleweight category. He picked up a total of thirteen medals in his career, including six (one gold, one silver, and four bronze) from the Pan American Judo Championships, and represented his nation Dominican Republic in the 90-kg class in two editions of the Olympic Games (2000 and 2004). Coming from a sporting pedigree, Geraldino also shared the same sport with his older brother Jose Augusto, who competed in the 100-kg division at the 1996 and 2000 Summer Olympics. They also have a younger brother called Jose Antonio which competed internationally as well in the 90-kg class.

Geraldino made his official debut at the 2000 Summer Olympics in Sydney, where he competed in the men's 90-kg division. He received a shido penalty for his passivity over Romanian judoka and 1999 world champion Adrian Croitoru, and thereby lost his opening match upon the referee's decision.

At the 2004 Summer Olympics in Athens, Geraldino qualified for his second Dominican Republic squad in the men's middleweight class (90 kg) by granting an unused berth from the International Judo Federation and the Dominican Republic Olympic Committee (Spanish: Comité Olímpico Dominicano), following his denouncement on mistreatment and a series of irregularities against the federation's engineer and treasurer Jaime Casanovas. Geraldino quickly dropped Andorra's Toni Besolí into the mat to score an ippon victory in his opening match, before falling in a sliding lapel strangle hold (okuri eri jime) to Great Britain's Winston Gordon in the next bout. With Gordon moving forward to the medal podium phase, Geraldino sought redemption for an Olympic bronze through the repechage, but he could not impose himself on his first playoff with two penalties and a defeat to Australia's Daniel Kelly by an ippon and a single leg takedown (kuchiki taoshi) forty seconds before the five-minute bout expired.

After Judo, Vicbart went to Florida International University in Miami where he earned a degree in Sports Medicine. He now owns G Health Clinic where they take care of patients with injuries mostly coming from sports.

Also, the Geraldino Judo Academy was opened in 2011.

Together with his younger brother Jose Antonio which kids call "Sensei Moreno" they teach over 75 young kids ages 5 and up hoping to someday have them follow in their footsteps and become Olimpians.
