= Judo at the 2002 South American Games =

Judo competition

This page shows the results of the Judo Competition for men and women at the 2002 South American Games, with the finals held on Sunday August 4, 2002 in Rio de Janeiro, Brazil.

== Men's competition ==
=== Super-Lightweight (– 55 kg) ===
RANK	NAME
Gold medal	Adriano Yamamoto (BRA)
Silver medal	Oscar Castillo (PER)
Bronze medal	Emiliano Cassineri (ARG)
Bronze medal	Gonzalo Moreno (CHI)

=== Extra-Lightweight (– 60 kg) ===
RANK	NAME
	João Derly (BRA)
Silver medal	Miguel Albarracin (ARG)
Bronze medal	Derlly Vasquez Bernal (PER)
Bronze medal	Juan Barahona (ECU)

=== Half-Lightweight (– 66 kg) ===
RANK	NAME
Gold medal	Jorge Lencina (ARG)
Silver medal	Leandro da Cunha (BRA)
Bronze medal	Jean-Pierre Choy (PER)
Bronze medal	Juan José Paz (BOL)

=== Lightweight (– 73 kg) ===
RANK	NAME
Gold medal	Sebastian Pereira (BRA)
Silver medal	Rodrigo Lucenti (ARG)
Bronze medal	Alejandro Lesperguer (CHI)
Bronze medal	José Gonzales (ECU)

=== Half-Middleweight (– 81 kg) ===
RANK	NAME
Gold medal	Flávio Canto (BRA)
Silver medal	Alvaro Paseyro (URU)
Bronze medal	Ariel Sganga (ARG)
Bronze medal	Raul Vergara (CHI)

=== Middleweight (– 90 kg) ===
RANK	NAME
Gold medal	Renato Dagnino (BRA)
Silver medal	Milton Terra (URU)
Bronze medal	Gabriel Lama (CHI)
Bronze medal	Diego Rosati (ARG)

=== Half-Heavyweight (– 100 kg) ===
RANK	NAME
Gold medal	Mário Sabino (BRA)
Silver medal	Andrés Loforte (ARG)

=== Heavyweight (+ 100 kg) ===
RANK	NAME
Gold medal	Carlos Cisneros (ARG)
Silver medal	Alexandre Mangueira (BRA)

=== Open Class ===
RANK	NAME
Gold medal	Daniel Hernandes (BRA)
Silver medal	Gabriel Lama (CHI)
Bronze medal	Alfredo Paniagua (BOL)
Bronze medal	Milton Terra (URU)

== Women's competition ==
=== Super-Lightweight (– 44 kg) ===
RANK	NAME
Gold medal	Glenda Miranda (ECU)
Silver medal	Anderessa Fernandes (BRA)
	Maria Sosa (URU)

=== Extra-Lightweight (– 48 kg) ===
RANK	NAME
Gold medal	Carla Delgado (PER)
Silver medal	Alba Palomino (ECU)
	Daniela Polzin (BRA)

=== Half-Lightweight (– 52 kg) ===
RANK	NAME
Gold medal	Katia Maia (BRA)
Silver medal	Liliana Delgado (PER)
Bronze medal	Valeria Palomino (ECU)

=== Lightweight (– 57 kg) ===
RANK	NAME
Gold medal	Tânia Ferreira (BRA)
Silver medal	Diana Villavicencio (ECU)
Bronze medal	Kathia Varcalcel (PER)

=== Half-Middleweight (– 63 kg) ===
RANK	NAME
Gold medal	Cristiane Parmigiano (BRA)
Silver medal	Daniela Krukower (ARG)
Bronze medal	Diana Maza (ECU)

=== Middleweight (– 70 kg) ===
RANK	NAME
Gold medal	Cristina Sebastião (BRA)
Silver medal	Diana Chalá (ECU)

=== Half-Heavyweight (– 78 kg) ===
RANK	NAME
Gold medal	Rosangela Conceição (BRA)

=== Heavyweight (+ 78 kg) ===
RANK	NAME
Gold medal	Carmen Chalá (ECU)
Silver medal	Luzia Fernandes (BRA)

=== Open Class ===
RANK	NAME
Gold medal	Viviane de Olivieira (BRA)
Silver medal	Carmen Chalá (ECU)
