= Edelmar Zanol =

Brazilian judoka

Personal information
- Born: 1 January 1975 (age 50); Guaira, Sao Paulo, Brazil

Sport
- Sport: Judo

Edelmar Zanol (born 1 January 1975) is a Brazilian judoka. He competed in the men's middleweight event at the 1996 Summer Olympics.
