= José Goldschmied =

Mexican judoka (born 1975)

José Goldschmied Stoupignan (born September 12, 1975, in Mexico City) is a Mexican judoka. He was a national champion at 16 and he participated in the 2004 Summer Olympics in Judo (Men's Middle (81–90 kg))

== Personal life ==
Goldschmied is the son of Gabriel Goldschmied, the president of the Mexican Federation of Judo.
