= Bayankhutag, Khentii =

District in Khentii Province, Mongolia

Coordinates: 47°10′17″N 110°49′03″E

Bayankhutag District Баянхутаг сум ᠪᠠᠶ᠋ᠩᠬᠤᠲᠠᠭᠰᠤᠮᠤ
- District
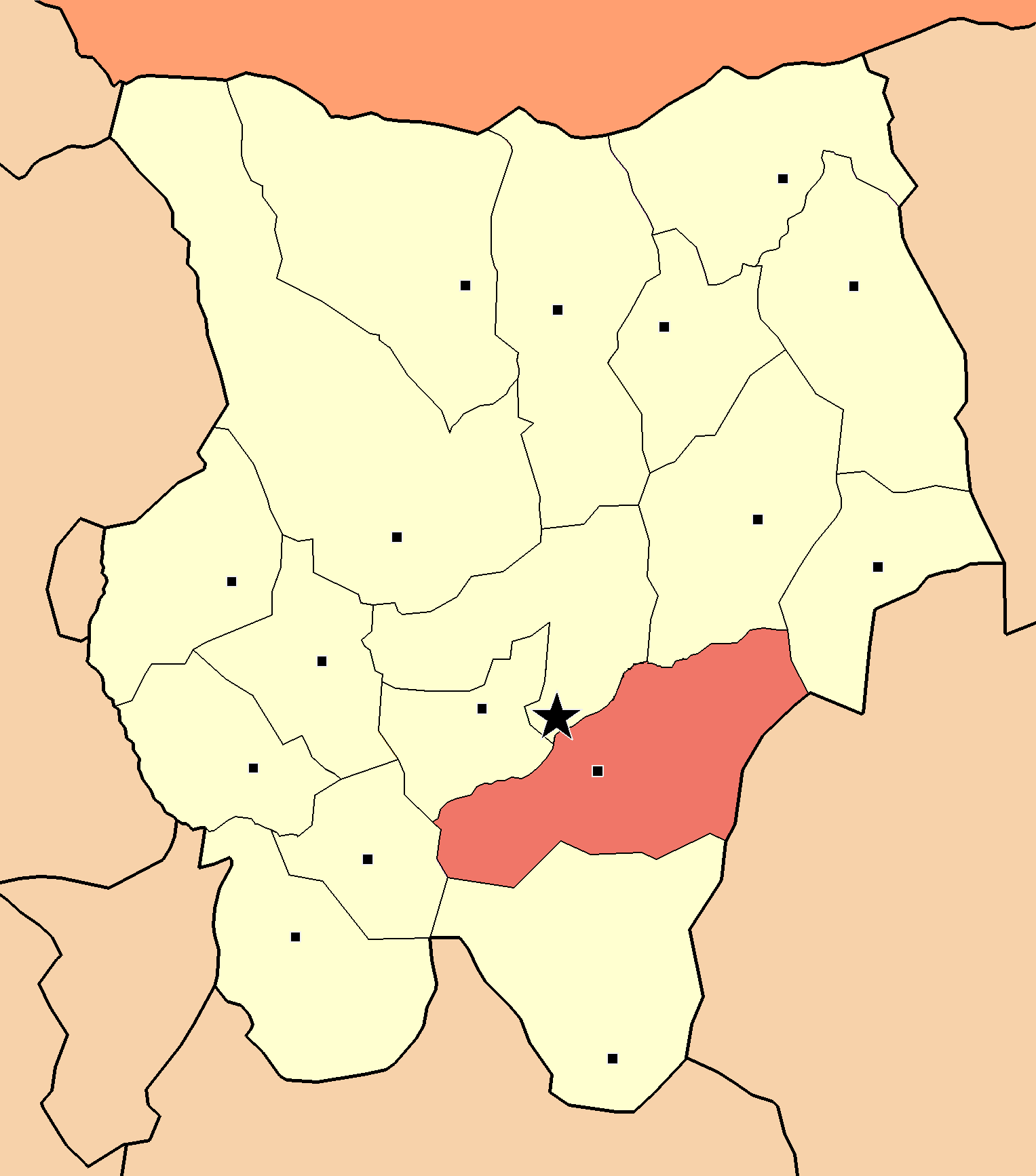
- Bayankhutag District in Khentii Province
- Country: Mongolia
- Province: Khentii Province

Area
  - Total: 6,029 km^{2} (2,328 sq mi)
- Time zone: UTC+8 (UTC + 8)

Bayankhutag (Mongolian: Баянхутаг, rich noble) is a sum (district) of Khentii Province in eastern Mongolia. In 2010, its population was 1,949.

== Administrative divisions ==
The district is divided into three bags, which are:

- Jargalant (Жаргалант)
- Tsantiin khooloi (Цантын хоолой)
- Ulaan-Undur (Улаан-Өндөр)
