= Marko Spittka =

German judoka (born 1971)

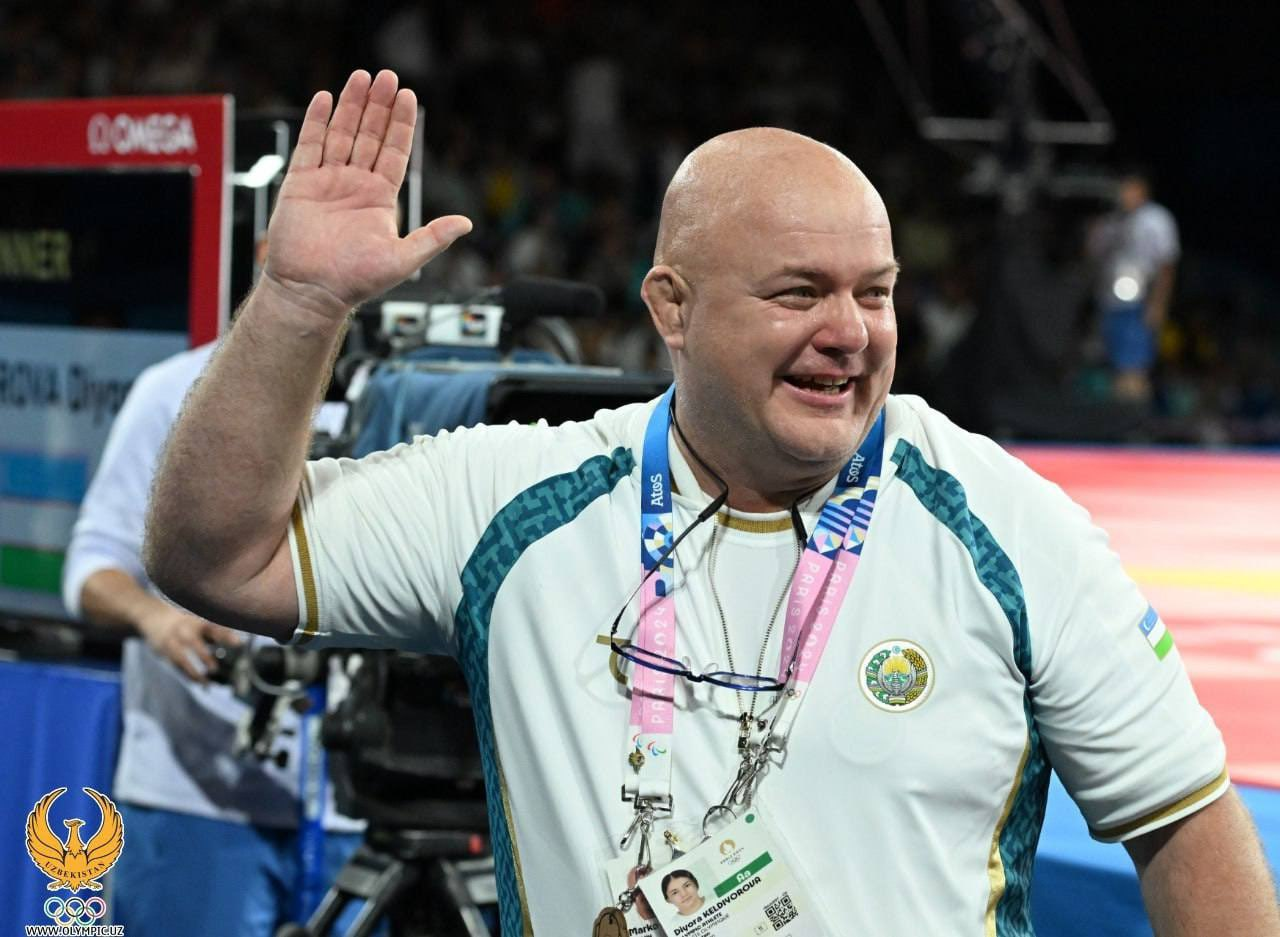

Personal information
- Born: 22 April 1971 (age 55)
- Occupation: Judoka

Sport
- Country: Germany
- Sport: Judo
- Weight class: –78 kg, –86 kg, –90 kg
- Rank: 7th dan black belt

Achievements and titles
- Olympic Games: (bronze) (1996)
- World Champ.: (silver) (1997)
- European Champ.: (gold) (1992)
Medal record
Men's judo
Representing Germany
Olympic Games
Bronze medal – third place	1996 Atlanta	‍–‍86 kg
World Championships
Silver medal – second place	1997 Paris	‍–‍86 kg
European Championships
Gold medal – first place	1992 Paris	‍–‍78 kg
Silver medal – second place	1998 Oviedo	‍–‍90 kg
World Juniors Championships
Gold medal – first place	1990 Dijon	‍–‍78 kg
European Junior Championships
Gold medal – first place	1990 Ankara	‍–‍78 kg
Silver medal – second place	1989 Athens	‍–‍78 kg

Profile at external databases
- IJF: 1215
- JudoInside.com: 289
- Updated on 4 June 2023

Marko Spittka (born 22 April 1971) is a German judoka. He won a bronze medal in the half-lightweight (–86 kg) division at the 1996 Summer Olympics.
