= Frédéric Demontfaucon =

French judoka (born 1973)

Personal information
- Born: 24 December 1973 (age 52) Le Creusot, Saône-et-Loire, France
- Occupation: Judoka

Sport
- Country: France
- Sport: Judo
- Weight class: –90 kg, –100 kg

Achievements and titles
- Olympic Games: (bronze) (2000)
- World Champ.: (2001)
- European Champ.: (bronze) (2001, 2007)
Medal record
Men's judo
Representing France
Olympic Games
Bronze medal – third place	2000 Sydney	‍–‍90 kg
World Championships
Gold medal – first place	2001 Munich	‍–‍90 kg
European Championships
Bronze medal – third place	2001 Paris	‍–‍90 kg
Bronze medal – third place	2007 Belgrade	‍–‍100 kg

Profile at external databases
- IJF: 52695
- JudoInside.com: 2461
- Updated on 31 May 2023

Frédéric Demontfaucon (born 24 December 1973) is a French judoka. He won a bronze Metal at the 2000 Sydney Olympics, followed by winning the 2001 world Championships. He moved up from the -90 kg division to the -100 kg division around 2007.

== Achievements ==
Year	Tournament	Place	Weight class
2007	European Judo Championships	3rd	Half heavyweight (100 kg)
2004	European Judo Championships	5th	Middleweight (90 kg)
2003	European Judo Championships	5th	Middleweight (90 kg)
2001	World Judo Championships	1st	Middleweight (90 kg)
2001	European Judo Championships	3rd	Middleweight (90 kg)
2000	Olympic Games	3rd	Middleweight (90 kg)
2000	European Judo Championships	5th	Middleweight (90 kg)
1995	World Judo Championships	5th	Middleweight (86 kg)
