= Darcel Yandzi =

French judoka (born 1973)

Medal record

Men's judo

World Championships
Bronze medal – third place	1993 Hamilton	78 kg

European Championships
Gold medal – first place	1993 Athens	78 kg

Darcel Yandzi (born 11 June 1973 in Kinshasa, Zaire (now the Democratic Republic of the Congo) is a French judoka who competed at the 1996 Summer Olympics.

== Achievements ==
Year	Tournament	Place	Weight class
2001	European Judo Championships	7th	Half middleweight (81 kg)
1993	World Judo Championships	3rd	Half middleweight (78 kg)
1993	European Judo Championships	1st	Half middleweight (78 kg)
