= Ruslan Mashurenko =

Ukrainian judoka (born 1971)

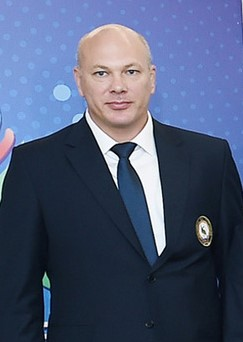
- Portrait of Ruslan Mashurenko

Personal information
- Born: 13 March 1971 (age 55)
- Occupation: Judoka

Sport
- Country: Ukraine
- Sport: Judo
- Weight class: ‍–‍86 kg, ‍–‍90 kg

Achievements and titles
- Olympic Games: (bronze) (2000)
- World Champ.: 5th (1993, 1995, 1997)
- European Champ.: (bronze) (1995, 2000)
Medal record
Men's judo
Representing Ukraine
Olympic Games
Bronze medal – third place	2000 Sydney	‍–‍90 kg
European Championships
Bronze medal – third place	1995 Birmingham	‍–‍86 kg
Bronze medal – third place	2000 Wrocław	‍–‍90 kg
Summer Universiade
Bronze medal – third place	1999 Palma de Mallorca	Men's team

Profile at external databases
- IJF: 42824
- JudoInside.com: 483
- Updated on 31 May 2023

Ruslan Mashurenko (born 13 March 1971) is a Ukrainian judoka. He won a bronze medal in the middleweight (90 kg) division at the 2000 Summer Olympics, honorary president of Odesa Region Judo Federation.

== Achievements ==
Year	Tournament	Place	Weight class
2000	Olympic Games	3rd	Middleweight (90 kg)
2000	European Judo Championships	3rd	Middleweight (90 kg)
1997	World Judo Championships	5th	Middleweight (86 kg)
1996	European Judo Championships	5th	Middleweight (86 kg)
1995	World Judo Championships	5th	Middleweight (86 kg)
1995	European Judo Championships	3rd	Middleweight (86 kg)
1994	European Judo Championships	5th	Middleweight (86 kg)
1993	World Judo Championships	5th	Middleweight (86 kg)
