= Dionysios Iliadis =

Greek judoka (born 1983)

Personal information
- Native name: Διονύσιος Ηλιάδης
- Nationality: Greek
- Born: 22 January 1983 (age 43)
- Occupation: Judoka

Sport
- Country: Greece
- Sport: Judo
- Weight class: –100 kg

Achievements and titles
- Olympic Games: 13th (2004)
- World Champ.: 13th (2005)
- European Champ.: 7th (2001)
Medal record
Men's judo
Representing Greece
European U23 Championships
Bronze medal – third place	2003 Yerevan	–100 kg
European Junior Championships
Silver medal – second place	2001 Budapest	–100 kg
Mediterranean Games
Bronze medal – third place	2005 Almeria	–100 kg

Profile at external databases
- IJF: 61537
- JudoInside.com: 11165
- Updated on 13 February 2022

Dionysios Iliadis (Greek: Διονύσιος Ηλιάδης; born 22 January 1983) is a Greek judoka (Judo competitor).
