= Fernando González (judoka) =

Spanish judoka (born 1969)

Personal information
- Born: 30 April 1969 (age 55)
- Occupation: Judoka

Sport
- Sport: Judo

Profile at external databases
- JudoInside.com: 624

Fernando González (born 30 April 1969) is a Spanish judoka.

== Achievements ==
Year	Tournament	Place	Weight class
2000	Olympic Games	7th	Middleweight (90 kg)
2000	European Judo Championships	7th	Middleweight (90 kg)
1998	European Judo Championships	7th	Middleweight (90 kg)
1997	Mediterranean Games	3rd	Middleweight (86 kg)
1995	European Judo Championships	5th	Middleweight (86 kg)
1993	Mediterranean Games	2nd	Middleweight (86 kg)
