= Mark Huizinga =

Dutch judoka (born 1973)

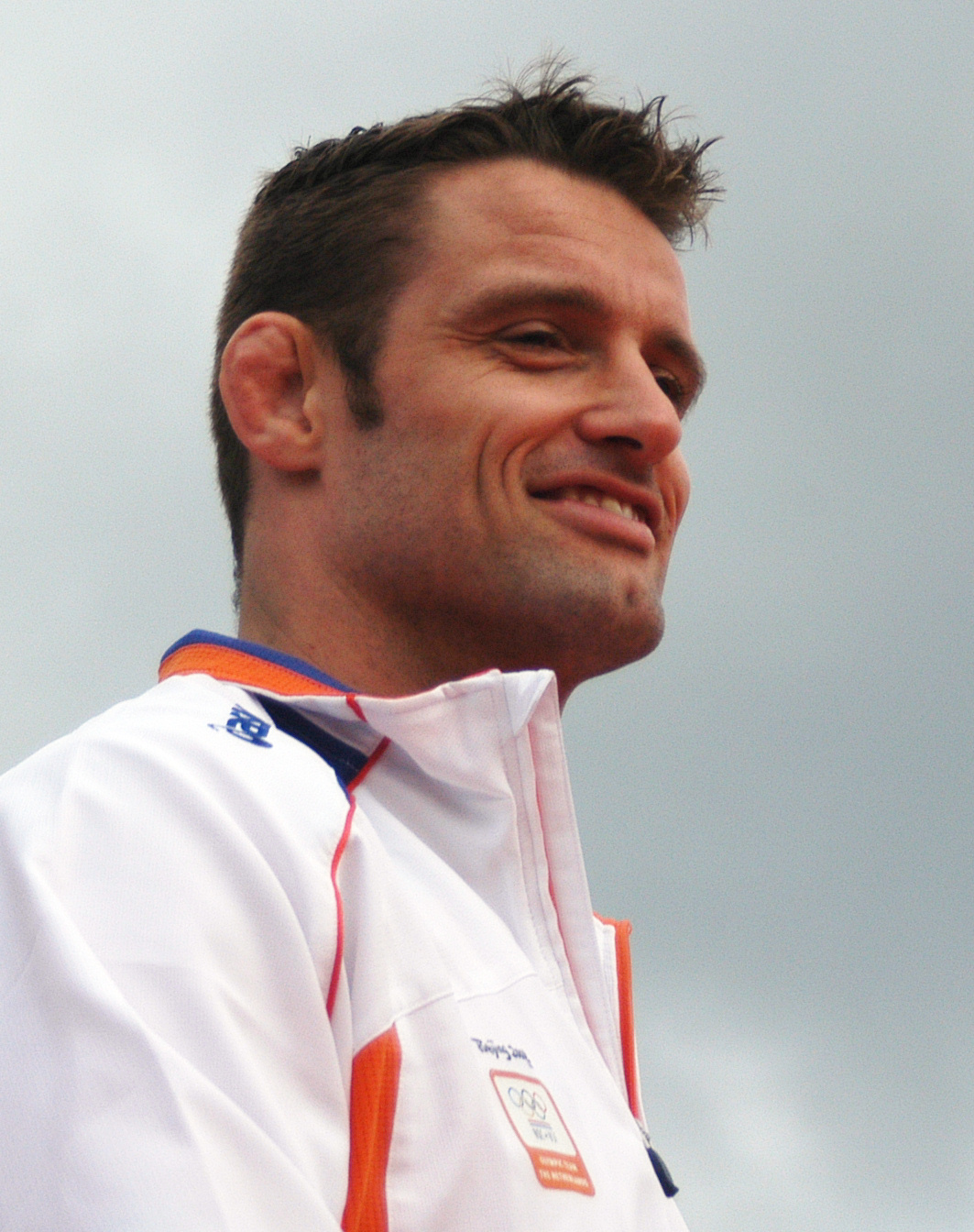

Personal information
- Born: 10 September 1973 (age 52) Vlaardingen, Netherlands
- Occupation: Judoka
- Website: www.markhuizinga.nl/english

Sport
- Country: Netherlands
- Sport: Judo
- Weight class: –90 kg
- Rank: 7th dan black belt

Achievements and titles
- Olympic Games: (gold) (2000)
- World Champ.: (bronze) (2005)
- European Champ.: (gold) (1996, 1997, 1998, 2001, 2008)
Medal record
Men's judo
Representing the Netherlands
Olympic Games
Gold medal – first place	2000 Sydney	‍–‍90 kg
Bronze medal – third place	1996 Atlanta	‍–‍86 kg
Bronze medal – third place	2004 Athens	‍–‍90 kg
World Championships
Bronze medal – third place	2005 Cairo	‍–‍90 kg
European Championships
Gold medal – first place	1996 The Hague	‍–‍86 kg
Gold medal – first place	1997 Oostende	‍–‍86 kg
Gold medal – first place	1998 Oviedo	‍–‍90 kg
Gold medal – first place	2001 Paris	‍–‍90 kg
Gold medal – first place	2008 Lisbon	‍–‍90 kg
Silver medal – second place	2000 Wrocław	‍–‍90 kg
Silver medal – second place	2004 Bucharest	‍–‍90 kg
Bronze medal – third place	1994 Gdansk	‍–‍78 kg
Bronze medal – third place	1999 Bratislava	‍–‍90 kg
Bronze medal – third place	2002 Maribor	‍–‍90 kg
Bronze medal – third place	2003 Düsseldorf	‍–‍90 kg
Bronze medal – third place	2005 Rotterdam	‍–‍90 kg

Profile at external databases
- IJF: 3395
- JudoInside.com: 54
- Updated on 30 May 2023

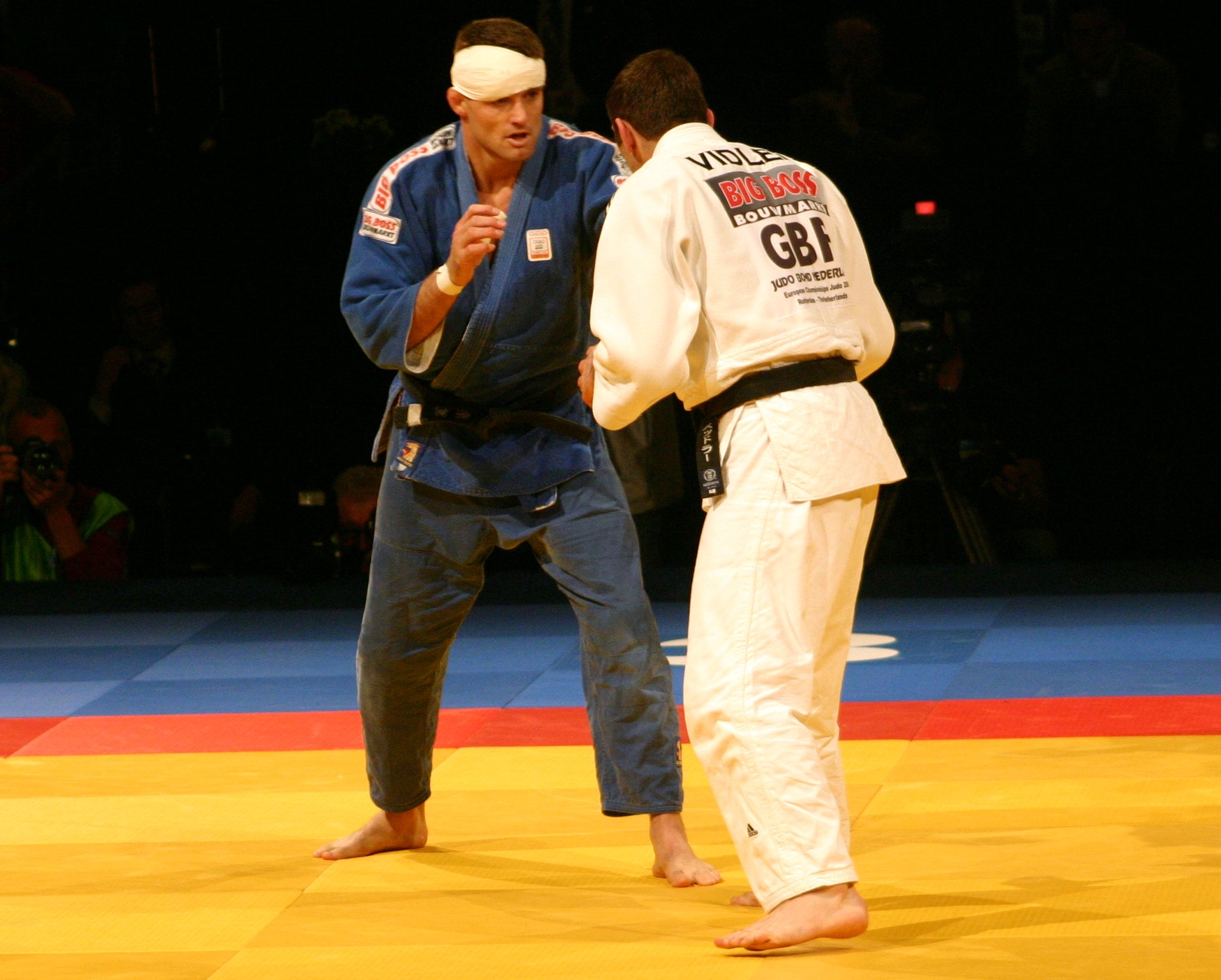
Huizinga at the 2005 European Championships

Mark Huizinga (born 10 September 1973) is a Dutch judoka and Olympic champion.

Huizinga was born in Vlaardingen, South Holland in Netherlands in 1973. He won the gold medal in the men's under 90 kg class at the 2000 Summer Olympics by defeating Brazil's Carlos Honorato by ippon. He took bronze at the 1996 and 2004 Summer Olympics. Other laurels include five European Championships and a bronze medal at the 2005 World Championships. Huizinga retired after the 2008 Olympics.

== Trivia ==
On 20 January 2010, Huizinga participated in De Nationale IQ test (The National IQ test) of Dutch broadcaster BNN, an informal quiz/comedy show. He was rated with an intelligence quotient of 142, an all-time record on the show.

Olympic Games
Preceded by Nico Rienks	Flagbearer for Netherlands; Athens 2004	Succeeded by Jeroen Delmee
