= Yuta Yazaki =

Japanese judoka (born 1980)

Personal information
- Born: 8 April 1980 (age 46)
- Occupation: Judoka

Sport
- Country: Japan
- Sport: Judo
- Weight class: –90 kg

Achievements and titles
- World Champ.: R16 (2003)
- Asian Champ.: (gold) (2002, 2003)
Medal record
Men's judo
Representing Japan
Asian Games
Gold medal – first place	2002 Busan	–90 kg
Asian Championships
Gold medal – first place	2003 Jeju	–90 kg
World Juniors Championships
Gold medal – first place	1998 Cali	–90 kg

Profile at external databases
- IJF: 11560
- JudoInside.com: 1064
- Updated on 2 June 2022

Yuta Yazaki (矢嵜 雄大, Yazaki Yūta; born 8 April 1980) is a Japanese judoka. He won a gold medal at the -90 kg category of the 2002 Asian Games.

He is from Toshima, Tokyo. He became famous with Keiji Suzuki and Yasuyuki Muneta, when he was a student of high school. After graduation from Meiji University, He belongs to Ryotokuji Gakuen.

== Achievements ==
Year	Date	Tournament	Place	Weight class
2007	12.8	Jigoro Kano Cup	5th	Middleweight (-90 kg)
2007	11.18	Kodokan Cup	3rd	Middleweight (-90 kg)
2007	4.29	All-Japan Championships	Round of 38	-
2007	2.4	Tbilisi World Cup	1st	Middleweight (-90 kg)
2006	11.19	Kodokan Cup	2nd	Middleweight (-90 kg)
2006	4.2	All-Japan Weight Class Championships	2nd	Middleweight (-90 kg)
2006	2.25	Hamburg Super World Cup	2nd	Middleweight (-90 kg)
2006	1.15	Jigoro Kano Cup	7th	Middleweight (-90 kg)
2005	4.29	All-Japan Championships	5th	-
2005	1.9	Jigoro Kano Cup	5th	-
2004	11.21	Kodokan Cup	2nd	Middleweight (-90 kg)
2004	4.4	All-Japan Weight Class Championships	3rd	Middleweight (-90 kg)
2004	2.21	Hamburg Super World Cup	1st	Middleweight (-90 kg)
2003	10.31	Asian Championships	1st	Middleweight (-90 kg)
2003	9.12	World Championships	Round of 16	Middleweight (-90 kg)
2003	4.29	All-Japan Championships	5th	-
2003	4.6	All-Japan Weight Class Championships	1st	Middleweight (-90 kg)
2003	1.12	Jigoro Kano Cup	1st	Middleweight (-90 kg)
2002	10.1	Asian Games	1st	Middleweight (-90 kg)
2002	4.7	All-Japan Weight Class Championships	1st	Middleweight (-90 kg)
2001	11.24	Kodokan Cup	2nd	Middleweight (-90 kg)
2001	5.24	East Asian Games	2nd	Middleweight (-90 kg)
2001	4.29	All-Japan Championships	5th	-
2001	1.14	Jigoro Kano Cup	Round of 16	-
1998	8–11 October	World Junior Championships	1st	Middleweight (-90 kg)
