= Xu Zhiming =

Chinese Olympic judoka

Personal information
- Born: 29 January 1980 (age 46)
- Occupation: Judoka

Sport
- Sport: Judo

Profile at external databases
- JudoInside.com: 12319

Xu Zhiming (born 29 January 1980) is a former Chinese judoka who competed in the 2000 Summer Olympics.
