= Rasul Salimov =

Azerbaijani Olympic judoka

Medal record

Men's Judo

Representing Azerbaijan

World Championships
Bronze medal – third place	2001 Munich	90 kg

European Championships
Silver medal – second place	2001 Paris	90 kg
Bronze medal – third place	1999 Bratislava	90 kg
Bronze medal – third place	2000 Wroclaw	90 kg

Rasul Salimov (born December 26, 1981, in Dzhaba, Dagestan, USSR) is a Dagestani judoka, of Lezgin heritage.

== Achievements ==
Year	Tournament	Place	Weight class
2002	European Judo Championships	5th	Middleweight (90 kg)
2001	World Judo Championships	3rd	Middleweight (90 kg)
2001	European Judo Championships	2nd	Middleweight (90 kg)
2000	Olympic Games	5th	Middleweight (90 kg)
2000	European Judo Championships	3rd	Middleweight (90 kg)
1999	European Judo Championships	3rd	Middleweight (90 kg)
