= Eduardo Costa (judoka) =

Argentine judoka (born 1977)

Personal information
- Born: 23 September 1977 (age 48) San Miguel de Tucumán, Argentina

Sport
- Sport: Judo
Medal record
Representing Argentina
Pan American Games
| Silver medal – second place | 1999 Winnipeg | Middleweight |

Eduardo Edilio Costa Gramajo (born 23 September 1977) is an Argentine judoka who competed in the 2000 Summer Olympics, in the 2004 Summer Olympics, and in the 2008 Summer Olympics.
