= Yosvany Despaigne =

Cuban Olympic judoka (born 1976)

Personal information
- Born: April 13, 1976 (age 50) Cienfuegos, Cuba
Medal record
Men's Judo
Representing Cuba
Pan American Games
Bronze medal – third place	1999 Winnipeg	Middleweight
Bronze medal – third place	2003 Santo Domingo	Middleweight
Summer Universiade
Gold medal – first place	2001 Beijing	Middleweight
Bronze medal – third place	1999 Palma de Mallorca	Middleweight
Central American and Caribbean Games
Gold medal – first place	1998 Maracaibo	Middleweight

Yosvane Oreidis Despaigne Terry (born April 13, 1976) is a male judoka from Cuba, who twice won the bronze medal in the men's middleweight division (– 90 kg) at the Pan American Games (1999 and 2003).

He represented his native country at three consecutive Summer Olympics, starting in 1996 in Atlanta, Georgia. His younger brother Oreidis Despaigne was also competing as a judoka on the international level.
