= Brian Olson =

American judoka (born 1973)

Personal information
- Born: March 6, 1973 (age 53) Tallahassee, Florida, U.S.
- Occupation: Judoka

Sport
- Sport: Judo
Medal record
Men's Judo
Representing United States
World Championships
Bronze medal – third place	1997 Paris	86 kg
Pan American Games
Gold medal – first place	1999 Winnipeg	90 kg
Gold medal – first place	2003 Santo Domingo	90 kg
Bronze medal – third place	1995 Mar del Plata	86 kg

Profile at external databases
- IJF: 52688
- JudoInside.com: 3586

Brian Perry Olson (born March 6, 1973) has been a competitor on four United States Olympic teams in judo: 1996 (under 86 kg), 2000 (under 90 kg), and 2004 (under 90 kg), and 2008. He won the bronze medal in the 1997 World Judo Championships (under 86 kg).

Olson graduated from Coronado High School in 1991 and attended the University of Colorado Colorado Springs from 1997–1999.

Brian Olson is also a black belt in Brazilian Jiu Jitsu.
