= Iran at the 1996 Summer Olympics =

- IOC code: IRI
- NOC: National Olympic Committee of the Islamic Republic of Iran
- Website: www.olympic.ir (in Persian and English)

in Atlanta, United States
- Competitors: 18 in 6 sports
- Flag bearer: Lida Fariman
- Medals Ranked 43rd: Gold 1 Silver 1 Bronze 1 Total 3

Summer Olympics appearances (overview)
- 1900; 1904–1936; 1948; 1952; 1956; 1960; 1964; 1968; 1972; 1976; 1980–1984; 1988; 1992; 1996; 2000; 2004; 2008; 2012; 2016; 2020; 2024; 2028

Athletes from the Islamic Republic of Iran competed at the 1996 Summer Olympics in Atlanta, United States. This was for the first time after the Iranian Revolution of 1979 that Iran had a female athlete in its team. Wrestler Rasoul Khadem won the nation's first Olympic Games gold medal in 28 years since Mexico City 1968.

== Competitors ==
Sport	Men	Women	Total
Aquatics, Swimming	1		1
Athletics	1		1
Boxing	4		4
Judo	1		1
Shooting		1	1
Wrestling	10		10
Total	17	1	18

== Medal summary ==
=== Medal table ===
Sport	Gold	Silver	Bronze	Total
Wrestling	1	1	1	3
Total	1	1	1	3

=== Medalists ===
Medal	Name	Sport	Event
Gold	Rasoul Khadem	Wrestling	Men's freestyle 90 kg
Silver	Abbas Jadidi	Wrestling	Men's freestyle 100 kg
Bronze	Amir Reza Khadem	Wrestling	Men's freestyle 82 kg

== Results by event ==
=== Aquatics ===
==== Swimming ====
Men

Athlete	Event	Heats		Final	
Athlete	Event	Time	Rank	Time	Rank
Hamed Rezakhani	1500 m freestyle	17:22.86	33	Did not advance	

=== Athletics ===
Men

Athlete	Event	Round 1			Final		Rank
Athlete	Event	Heat	Time	Rank	Time	Rank	Rank
Hamid Sajjadi	10000 m	1	29:22.65	20	Did not advance		35

=== Boxing ===
Men

Athlete	Event	1/16 elimination	1/8 elimination	Quarterfinal	Semifinal	Final	Rank
Babak Moghimi	63.5 kg	Suslekov (BUL); W 11–3	Legras (SEY); W 16–7	Niyazymbetov (KAZ); L 8–13	Did not advance		5
Kourosh Molaei	75 kg	Wells (USA); L 7–24	Did not advance				17
Ayoub Pourtaghi	81 kg	Mandengue (FRA); L 9–21	Did not advance				17
Mohammad Reza Samadi	+91 kg	Dokiwari (NGR); L RSCI	Did not advance				17

=== Judo ===
Men

Athlete	Event	1st round	2nd round	3rd round	Quarterfinal	Semifinal	Repechage	Final	Rank
Amir Reza Ghomi	71 kg	Bye	Núñez (CRC); W Hansukomake	Kwak (KOR); L Ippon	Repechage; Kouassi (CIV); W Shido	Repechage; Shturbabin (UZB); L Ippon	Did not advance		9

=== Shooting ===
Women

Athlete	Event	Preliminaries		Final		
Athlete	Event	Score	Rank	Score	Total	Rank
Lida Fariman	10 m air rifle	379	46	Did not advance		

=== Wrestling ===
Men's freestyle

Athlete	Event	Round 1	1/8 final	Quarterfinal	Semifinal	Round 5	Round 6	Final	Rank
Gholamreza Mohammadi	52 kg	Varela (CUB); W 4–0	Legrand (FRA); W 5–0	Bye	Abdullayev (AZE); L 0–10		Repechage; Mongush (RUS); L 1–3	5th place match Topaktaş (TUR); W 4–2	5
Mohammad Talaei	57 kg	Abdullayev (AZE); W 4–1	Guzov (BLR); L 3–5	Repechage; Puerto (CUB); W 5–0	Repechage; Umakhanov (RUS); W 1–0	Repechage; Zakhartdinov (UZB); W 4–2	Repechage; Ri (PRK); L Fall	5th place match Trstena (MKD); L 3–4	6
Abbas Hajkenari	62 kg	Brands (USA); L 0–3	Repechage; Nieves (PUR); L 3–8	Did not advance					19
Akbar Fallah	68 kg	Fadzaev (UZB); L 2–2	Repechage; Oziti (NGR); W 1–0	Repechage; Weiss (AUS); W 5–0	Repechage; Sánchez (CUB); L 1–3	Did not advance			10
Issa Momeni	74 kg	Saitiev (RUS); L 0–8	Repechage; Loizidis (GRE); W 3–0	Repechage; Rodríguez (CUB); L 1–4	Did not advance				16
Amir Reza Khadem	82 kg	Gogolishvili (GEO); W 3–0	Khinchagov (UZB); W 1–0	Bye	Magomedov (RUS); L 0–4		Repechage; Ibragimov (AZE); W 3–0	3rd place match Öztürk (TUR); W 0–0	3rd place, bronze medalist(s)
Rasoul Khadem	90 kg	Kodei (NGR); W 6–1	Bayramukov (KAZ); W 4–3	Bye	Tedeyev (UKR); W 3–0			Khadartsev (RUS); W 3–0	1st place, gold medalist(s)
Abbas Jadidi	100 kg	Magomedov (AZE); W 4–0	Khabelov (RUS); W 4–0	Bye	Garmulewicz (POL); W 4–1			Angle (USA); L 1–1	2nd place, silver medalist(s)
Ebrahim Mehraban	130 kg	Singh (GBR); W 6–2	Gombos (HUN); L 0–3	Repechage; Kovalevsky (KGZ); L 2–3	Did not advance				12

Men's Greco-Roman

Athlete	Event	Round 1	1/8 final	Quarterfinal	Semifinal	Round 5	Round 6	Final	Rank
Ahad Pazaj	62 kg	Marén (CUB); L 2–5	Bye	Repechage; Petrenko (BLR); W Fall	Repechage; Pirim (TUR); L 0–4	Did not advance			11
