= Judo at the 1996 Summer Olympics – Men's 71 kg =

Judo competition

Men's 71 kg at the Games of the XXVI Olympiad
- Venue: Georgia World Congress Center
- Date: 24 July 1996
- Competitors: 35 from 35 nations

Medalists
1st place, gold medalist(s)		Kenzo Nakamura	Japan
2nd place, silver medalist(s)		Kwak Dae-sung	South Korea
3rd place, bronze medalist(s)		Jimmy Pedro	United States
3rd place, bronze medalist(s)		Christophe Gagliano	France

These are the results of the men's 71 kg (also known as lightweight) competition in judo at the 1996 Summer Olympics in Atlanta, Georgia. A total of 35 men competed in this event, limited to jūdōka whose body weight was less than, or equal to, 71 kilograms. Competition took place in the Georgia World Congress Center.

== Tournament results ==
=== First round ===
As there were more than 32 qualifiers for the tournament, three first round matches were held to reduce the field to 32 judoka.

- Danny Kingston (GBR) defeated Sergey Kolesnikov (RUS)
- Bertalan Hajtos (HUN) defeated Juan González (GUA)
- Andrei Golban (MDA) defeated Davor Vlaskovac (BIH)

=== Main bracket ===
The gold and silver medalists were determined by the final match of the main single-elimination bracket.

1st Round
Andrew Payne (BAR)	L
Vladimeri Dgebuadze (GEO)	W
Loris Mularoni (SMR)	L
Guilherme Bentes (POR)	W
James Pedro (USA)	W
Danny Kingston (GBR)	L
Khaliun Boldbaatar (MGL)	W
Sebastian Alquati (ARG)	L
Martin Schmidt (GER)	W
Krzysztof Wojdan (POL)	L
Diego Brambilla (ITA)	L
Bertalan Hajtos (HUN)	W
Abdelhakim Harkat (ALG)	W
Francisco Rodríguez (PUR)	L
Kenzo Nakamura (JPN)	W
Thomas Schleicher (AUT)	L
Akhat Akhirov (KAZ)	L
Andrei Golban (MDA)	W
Huang Chien-lung (TPE)	L
Steve Corkin (NZL)	W
Sebastian Pereira (BRA)	W
Christophe Gagliano (FRA)	L
Salim Abanoz (TUR)	W
Jorge Pacce (PAR)	L
Andrey Shturbabin (UZB)	W
Hassen Moussa (TUN)	L
Juan Vargas (ESA)	L
Saleh Al-Sharrah (KUW)	W
Kwak Dae-sung (KOR)	W
David Kouassi (CIV)	L
Henry Nunez (CRC)	L
Amir Ghomi (IRI)	W

2nd Round
Vladimeri Dgebuadze (GEO)	W
Guilherme Bentes (POR)	L
James Pedro (USA)	L
Khaliun Boldbaatar (MGL)	W
Martin Schmidt (GER)	W
Bertalan Hajtos (HUN)	L
Abdelhakim Harkat (ALG)	L
Kenzo Nakamura (JPN)	W
Andrey Golban (MDA)	L
Steve Corkin (NZL)	W
Sebastian Pereira (BRA)	W
Salim Abanoz (TUR)	L
Andrey Shturbabin (UZB)	W
Saleh Al-Sharrah (KUW)	L
Kwak Dae-sung (KOR)	W
Amir Ghomi (IRI)	L

Quarterfinals
Vladimeri Dgebuadze (GEO)	L
Khaliun Boldbaatar (MGL)	W
Martin Schmidt (GER)	L
Kenzo Nakamura (JPN)	W
Steve Corkin (NZL)	L
Sebastian Pereira (BRA)	W
Andrey Shturbabin (UZB)	L
Kwak Dae-sung (KOR)	W

Semifinals
Khaliun Boldbaatar (MGL)	L
Kenzo Nakamura (JPN)	W
Sebastian Pereira (BRA)	L
Kwak Dae-sung (KOR)	W

Gold medal final
Kenzo Nakamura (JPN)	W
Kwak Dae-sung (KOR)	L

=== Repechage ===
The losing semifinalists as well as those judoka eliminated in earlier rounds by the four semifinalists of the main bracket advanced to the repechage. These matches determined the two bronze medalists for the event.

First round
Sebastian Alquati (ARG)	L
James Pedro (USA)	W
Abdelhakim Harkat (ALG)	L
Thomas Schleicher (AUT)	W
Christophe Gagliano (FRA)	W
Salim Abanoz (TUR)	L
David Kouassi (CIV)	L
Amir Ghomi (IRI)	W

Second round
Vladimeri Dgebuadze (GEO)	L
James Pedro (USA)	W
Martin Schmidt (GER)	W
Thomas Schleicher (AUT)	L
Christophe Gagliano (FRA)	W
Steve Corkin (NZL)	L
Amir Ghomi (IRI)	L
Andrey Shturbabin (UZB)	W

Third round
James Pedro (USA)	W
Martin Schmidt (GER)	L
Christophe Gagliano (FRA)	W
Andrey Shturbabin (UZB)	L

Bronze medal finals
James Pedro (USA)	W
Sebastian Pereira (BRA)	L
Christophe Gagliano (FRA)	W
Khaliun Boldbaatar (MGL)	L
