= Judo at the 2001 East Asian Games =

Judo competition

Judo Judo at the 2001 East Asian Games
- Venue: Osaka Prefectural Gymnasium
- Location: Osaka, Japan
- Dates: 24–27 May 2001

Competition at external databases
- Links: JudoInside

The judo competition at the 2001 East Asian Games was contested in eight weight classes, eight each for men and women.

This competition was held at Osaka Prefectural Gymnasium, from 24 to 27 May 2001.

== Medal overview ==
=== Men's events ===
Event	Gold	Silver	Bronze
Extra-lightweight (60 kg)	Minoru Konegawa (JPN)	Jung Bu-kyung (KOR)	Bazarbek Donbay (KAZ)
Extra-lightweight (60 kg)	Minoru Konegawa (JPN)	Jung Bu-kyung (KOR)	Ko Chen-Yu (TPE)
Half-lightweight (66 kg)	Tomoo Torii (JPN)	Ivan Baglayev (KAZ)	Zhang Guangjun (CHN)
Half-lightweight (66 kg)	Tomoo Torii (JPN)	Ivan Baglayev (KAZ)	Kim Hyung-ju (KOR)
Lightweight (73 kg)	Min Sung-ho (KOR)	Yusuke Kanamaru (JPN)	Sagdat Sadykov (KAZ)
Lightweight (73 kg)	Min Sung-ho (KOR)	Yusuke Kanamaru (JPN)	Suldbayar Damdin (MGL)
Half-middleweight (81 kg)	Cho In-chul (KOR)	Chen Chang-Ning (TPE)	Ryuichi Murata (JPN)
Half-middleweight (81 kg)	Cho In-chul (KOR)	Chen Chang-Ning (TPE)	Xiao Deqiang (CHN)
Middleweight (90 kg)	Yoon Dong-sik (KOR)	Yuta Yazaki (JPN)	Sergey Shakimov (KAZ)
Middleweight (90 kg)	Yoon Dong-sik (KOR)	Yuta Yazaki (JPN)	Xu Zhiming (CHN)
Half-heavyweight (100 kg)	Jang Sung-ho (KOR)	Ao Tegen (CHN)	Tomokazu Inoue (JPN)
Half-heavyweight (100 kg)	Jang Sung-ho (KOR)	Ao Tegen (CHN)	Martin Kelly (AUS)
Heavyweight (+100 kg)	Tatsuhiro Muramoto (JPN)	Kang Byung-jin (KOR)	Vyacheslav Berduta (KAZ)
Heavyweight (+100 kg)	Tatsuhiro Muramoto (JPN)	Kang Byung-jin (KOR)	Batjargal Ganbat (MGL)
Openweight	Hiroaki Takahashi (JPN)	Martin Kelly (AUS)	Yeldos Ikhsangaliyev (KAZ)
Openweight	Hiroaki Takahashi (JPN)	Martin Kelly (AUS)	Pan Song (CHN)

=== Women's events ===
Event	Gold	Silver	Bronze
Extra-lightweight (48 kg)	Zhao Shunxin (CHN)	Kim Young-Ran (KOR)	Oleya Meiramgaliyeva (KAZ)
Extra-lightweight (48 kg)	Zhao Shunxin (CHN)	Kim Young-Ran (KOR)	Chiho Hamano (JPN)
Half-lightweight (52 kg)	Yuki Yokosawa (JPN)	Li Ying (CHN)	Lee Eun-Hee (KOR)
Half-lightweight (52 kg)	Yuki Yokosawa (JPN)	Li Ying (CHN)	Pei Chun-Shih (TPE)
Lightweight (57 kg)	Noriko Mogi (JPN)	Kang Sin-Young (KOR)	Jun Shen (CHN)
Lightweight (57 kg)	Noriko Mogi (JPN)	Kang Sin-Young (KOR)	K. Erdenet-Od (MGL)
Half-middleweight (63 kg)	Li Shufang (CHN)	Lee Bok-Hee (KOR)	Carly Dixon (AUS)
Half-middleweight (63 kg)	Li Shufang (CHN)	Lee Bok-Hee (KOR)	Wang Chin-Fang (TPE)
Middleweight (70 kg)	Feng Song-Jian (CHN)	Sagat Abikeyeva (KAZ)	Catherine Arlove (AUS)
Middleweight (70 kg)	Feng Song-Jian (CHN)	Sagat Abikeyeva (KAZ)	Kim Mi-jung (KOR)
Half-heavyweight (78 kg)	Lee So-Yeon (KOR)	Mizuho Matsuzaki (JPN)	Yin Yufeng (CHN)
Half-heavyweight (78 kg)	Lee So-Yeon (KOR)	Mizuho Matsuzaki (JPN)	none
Heavyweight (+78 kg)	Yuan Hua (CHN)	Lee Hsiao-Hung (KOR)	Midori Shintani (JPN)
Heavyweight (+78 kg)	Yuan Hua (CHN)	Lee Hsiao-Hung (KOR)	E. Dolgormaa (MGL)
Openweight	Sun Fuming (CHN)	Mayumi Yamashita (JPN)	Lee Hsiao-Hung (TPE)
Openweight	Sun Fuming (CHN)	Mayumi Yamashita (JPN)	Choi Sook-Ie (KOR)

=== Medals table ===
Rank	Nation	Gold	Silver	Bronze	Total
1	Japan	6	4	4	14
2	South Korea	5	6	4	15
3	China	5	3	5	13
4	Kazakhstan	0	2	5	7
5	Chinese Taipei	0	1	4	5
6	Mongolia	0	0	5	5
7	Australia	0	0	4	4
Totals (7 entries)		16	16	31	63
