= Judo at the 2000 Summer Olympics – Women's +78 kg =

Women's +78 kg at the Games of the XXVII Olympiad
- Venue: Sydney Convention and Exhibition Centre
- Date: 22 September 2000
- Competitors: 24 from 24 nations

Medalists
1st place, gold medalist(s)		Yuan Hua	China
2nd place, silver medalist(s)		Daima Beltrán	Cuba
3rd place, bronze medalist(s)		Kim Seon-Young	South Korea
3rd place, bronze medalist(s)		Mayumi Yamashita	Japan

These are the results of the Women's +78 kg (also known as heavyweight) competition in judo at the 2000 Summer Olympics in Sydney. A total of 24 women qualified for this event, limited to jūdōka whose body weight was more than 78 kilograms. Competition took place in the Sydney Convention and Exhibition Centre on 22 September.

== Competitors ==
Athlete	Nation
Carmen Chala	Ecuador
Colleen Rosensteel	United States
Beata Maksymow	Poland
Mayumi Yamashita	Japan
Gulnara Kusherbayeva	Kazakhstan
Irina Rodina	Russia
Caroline Curren	Australia
Kim Seon-Young	South Korea
Dalma Beltrán	Cuba
Beatriz Martín	Spain
Brigitte Oliver	Belgium
Mara Kovacevic	FR Yugoslavia
Sandra Köppen	Germany
Maryna Prokof'yeva	Ukraine
Heba Hefny	Egypt
Karina Bryant	Great Britain
Adja Marieme Diop	Senegal
Christine Cicot	France
Yuan Hua	China
Fiona Iredale	New Zealand
Estela Riley	Panama
Priscila Marques	Brazil
Lee Hsiao-Hung	Chinese Taipei
Tsvetana Bozhilova	Bulgaria

== Main bracket ==
The gold and silver medalists were determined by the final match of the main single-elimination bracket.

Round of 32
Carmen Chala (ECU)	L
Colleen Rosensteel (USA)	W
Gulnara Kusherbayeva (KAZ)	L
Irina Rodina (RUS)	W
Kim Seon-Young (KOR)	L
Daima Beltrán (CUB)	W
Beatriz Martín (ESP)	L
Brigitte Oliver (BEL)	W
Sandra Köppen (GER)	W
Maryna Prokof'yeva (UKR)	L
Karina Bryant (GBR)	W
Adja Marieme Diop (SEN)	L
Fiona Iredale (NZL)	W
Estela Riley (PAN)	L
Lee Hsiao-Hung (TPE)	W
Tsvetana Bozhilova (BUL)	L

Round of 16
Colleen Rosensteel (USA)	W
Beata Maksymow (POL)	L
Mayumi Yamashita (JPN)	W
Irina Rodina (RUS)	L
Caroline Curren (AUS)	L
Daima Beltrán (CUB)	W
Brigitte Oliver (BEL)	W
Mara Kovacevic (YUG)	L
Sandra Köppen (GER)	W
Heba Hefny (EGY)	L
Karina Bryant (GBR)	L
Christine Cicot (FRA)	W
Yuan Hua (CHN)	W
Fiona Iredale (NZL)	L
Priscila Marques (BRA)	W
Lee Hsiao-Hung (TPE)	L

Quarterfinals
Colleen Rosensteel (USA)	L
Mayumi Yamashita (JPN)	W
Daima Beltrán (CUB)	W
Brigitte Oliver (BEL)	L
Sandra Köppen (GER)	W
Christine Cicot (FRA)	L
Yuan Hua (CHN)	W
Priscila Marques (BRA)	L

Semifinals
Mayumi Yamashita (JPN)	L
Daima Beltrán (CUB)	W
Sandra Köppen (GER)	L
Yuan Hua (CHN)	W

Gold medal final
Daima Beltrán (CUB)	L
Yuan Hua (CHN)	W

=== Repechage ===
The losing semifinalists as well as those judoka eliminated in earlier rounds by the four semifinalists of the main bracket advanced to the repechage. These matches determined the two bronze medalists for the event.

First round
Rodina (RUS)	W
Bye	L
Kim (KOR)	W
Curren (AUS)	L
Prokof'yeva (UKR)	L
Hefny (EGY)	W
Iredale (NZL)	W
Bye	L

Second round
Rodina (RUS)	W
Rosensteel (USA)	L
Kim (KOR)	W
Oliver (BEL)	L
Hefny (EGY)	L
Cicot (FRA)	W
Iredale (NZL)	L
Marques (BRA)	W

Third round
Rodina (RUS)	L
Kim (KOR)	W
Cicot (FRA)	W
Marques (BRA)	L

Bronze medal finals
Kim (KOR)	W
Köppen (GER)	L
Cicot (FRA)	L
Yamashita (JPN)	W
