= Judo at the 2006 Asian Games – Men's 100 kg =

Judo competition

Men's 100 kg at the 2006 Asian Games
- Venue: Qatar SC Indoor Hall
- Date: 2 December 2006
- Competitors: 16 from 16 nations

Medalists
gold medal	Jang Sung-ho	South Korea
silver medal	Satoshi Ishii	Japan
bronze medal	Askhat Zhitkeyev	Kazakhstan
bronze medal	Utkir Kurbanov	Uzbekistan

The men's 100 kilograms (Half heavyweight) competition at the 2006 Asian Games in Doha was held on 2 December at the Qatar SC Indoor Hall.

== Schedule ==
All times are Arabia Standard Time (UTC+03:00)

Date	Time	Event
Saturday, 2 December 2006	14:00	Round of 16
Saturday, 2 December 2006	14:00	Quarterfinals
Saturday, 2 December 2006	14:00	Repechage −1R
Saturday, 2 December 2006	14:00	Repechage final
Saturday, 2 December 2006	14:00	Semifinals
Saturday, 2 December 2006	14:00	Finals

== Results ==
Legend

- WO — Won by walkover

=== Main bracket ===
Round of 16
Nematullo Asranqulov (TJK)	1000
Yahya Al-Zahrani (KSA)	0000
Abbas Fallah (IRI)	0000
Satoshi Ishii (JPN)	1000
Yin Hongxing (CHN)	0111
Alain Bou Abboud (LIB)	0000
Mohammed Ali Ayad (QAT)	WO
Ghanam Al-Dikan (KUW)
Pongpitsanu Pratepwadtananon (THA)	0000
Askhat Zhitkeyev (KAZ)	1000
Utkir Kurbanov (UZB)	1010
Danil Babaev (KGZ)	0000
Tsend-Ayuushiin Ochirbat (MGL)	0010
Hudaýberdi Sahatow (TKM)	0000
Jang Sung-ho (KOR)	1100
Yahya Hsaba (SYR)	0000

Quarterfinals
Nematullo Asranqulov (TJK)	0000
Satoshi Ishii (JPN)	1000
Yin Hongxing (CHN)	0000
Mohammed Ali Ayad (QAT)	1000
Askhat Zhitkeyev (KAZ)	1000
Utkir Kurbanov (UZB)	0000
Tsend-Ayuushiin Ochirbat (MGL)	0000
Jang Sung-ho (KOR)	0020

Semifinals
Satoshi Ishii (JPN)	1111
Mohammed Ali Ayad (QAT)	0000
Askhat Zhitkeyev (KAZ)	0000
Jang Sung-ho (KOR)	0001

Gold medal contest
Satoshi Ishii (JPN)	0001
Jang Sung-ho (KOR)	1100

=== Repechage ===
Repechage −1R
Abbas Fallah (IRI)	0011
Nematullo Asranqulov (TJK)	0010
Bye
Yin Hongxing (CHN)
Pongpitsanu Pratepwadtananon (THA)	0000
Utkir Kurbanov (UZB)	1000
Yahya Hsaba (SYR)	0001
Tsend-Ayuushiin Ochirbat (MGL)	0110

Repechage final
Abbas Fallah (IRI)	0110
Yin Hongxing (CHN)	0010
Utkir Kurbanov (UZB)	0010
Tsend-Ayuushiin Ochirbat (MGL)	0001

Bronze medal contest
Abbas Fallah (IRI)	0001
Askhat Zhitkeyev (KAZ)	0021
Utkir Kurbanov (UZB)	0001
Mohammed Ali Ayad (QAT)	0000
