= Judo at the 1997 East Asian Games =

Judo competition

Judo Judo at the 1997 East Asian Games
- Venue: Dong-A University
- Location: Busan, South Korea
- Dates: 15–18 May 1997
- Nations: 9

The Judo competition at the 1997 East Asian Games was contested in eight weight classes, eight each for men and women.

This competition was held at Gym of Dong-A University, from 15 to 18 May. Japan and South Korea each won 6 gold medals, and China was third in the competition with 4 golds.

== Medal overview ==
=== Men's events ===
Event	Gold	Silver	Bronze
Extra-lightweight (60 kg)	Kazuhiko Tokuno (JPN)	Yeh Hsin-Hung (TPE)	Moon Dae-Hyun (KOR)
Extra-lightweight (60 kg)	Kazuhiko Tokuno (JPN)	Yeh Hsin-Hung (TPE)	Wang Yong (CHN)
Half-lightweight (65 kg)	Kim Hyuk (KOR)	Naoya Uchimura (JPN)	U. Erdenebaatar (MGL)
Half-lightweight (65 kg)	Kim Hyuk (KOR)	Naoya Uchimura (JPN)	Lin Wen-Tao (TPE)
Lightweight (71 kg)	Kwak Dae-Sung (KOR)	Kenzo Nakamura (JPN)	Ra Teer (CHN)
Lightweight (71 kg)	Kwak Dae-Sung (KOR)	Kenzo Nakamura (JPN)	Chen Chih-Ping (TPE)
Half-middleweight (78 kg)	Cho In-Chul (KOR)	Khaliuny Boldbaatar (MGL)	Makoto Takimoto (JPN)
Half-middleweight (78 kg)	Cho In-Chul (KOR)	Khaliuny Boldbaatar (MGL)	Lo Wei-Yu (TPE)
Middleweight (86 kg)	Hiroomi Fujita (JPN)	Jeon Ki-Young (KOR)	Odkhuu Batjargal (MGL)
Middleweight (86 kg)	Hiroomi Fujita (JPN)	Jeon Ki-Young (KOR)	Ao Tegen (CHN)
Half-heavyweight (95 kg)	Kim Hee-Soo (KOR)	Yoshio Nakamura (JPN)	Sergey Shakimov (KAZ)
Half-heavyweight (95 kg)	Kim Hee-Soo (KOR)	Yoshio Nakamura (JPN)	Yang Hongjun (CHN)
Heavyweight (+95 kg)	Shinichi Shinohara (JPN)	Liu Shenggang (CHN)	Kim Se-Hoon (KOR)
Heavyweight (+95 kg)	Shinichi Shinohara (JPN)	Liu Shenggang (CHN)	T. Tserenpuntsag (MGL)
Openweight	Pan Song (CHN)	(JPN)	Kim Jae-sik (KOR)
Openweight	Pan Song (CHN)	(JPN)	B. Badmaanyambuu (MGL)

=== Women's events ===
Event	Gold	Silver	Bronze
Extra-lightweight (48 kg)	Atsuko Nagai (JPN)	Yoo Hee-Joon (KOR)	G Altantsetseg (MGL)
Extra-lightweight (48 kg)	Atsuko Nagai (JPN)	Yoo Hee-Joon (KOR)	Yu Shu-Chen (TPE)
Half-lightweight (52 kg)	Kazue Nagai (JPN)	Hyun Sook-Hee (KOR)	Tang Lihong (CHN)
Half-lightweight (52 kg)	Kazue Nagai (JPN)	Hyun Sook-Hee (KOR)	Chan Mei-ling (HKG)
Lightweight (56 kg)	Liu Chuang (CHN)	Huang Al-Chun (TPE)	Masako Otsuka (JPN)
Lightweight (56 kg)	Liu Chuang (CHN)	Huang Al-Chun (TPE)	Park Mi-hee (KOR)
Half-middleweight (61 kg)	Jung Sung-Sook (KOR)	Yuko Emoto (JPN)	Qin Yuying (CHN)
Half-middleweight (61 kg)	Jung Sung-Sook (KOR)	Yuko Emoto (JPN)	Lee Ya-Wen (TPE)
Middleweight (66 kg)	Cho Min-Sun (KOR)	Wang Xianbo (CHN)	(JPN)
Middleweight (66 kg)	Cho Min-Sun (KOR)	Wang Xianbo (CHN)	Wu Mei-Ling (TPE)
Half-heavyweight (72 kg)	Saki Yoshida (JPN)	Evguenia Bogounova (KAZ)	Tang Ling (CHN)
Half-heavyweight (72 kg)	Saki Yoshida (JPN)	Evguenia Bogounova (KAZ)	D. Tserenkhand (MGL)
Heavyweight (+72 kg)	Sun Fuming (CHN)	Mako Kuniyoshi (JPN)	Lee Hyun-Kyung (KOR)
Heavyweight (+72 kg)	Sun Fuming (CHN)	Mako Kuniyoshi (JPN)	Gulnara Kusherbayeva (KAZ)
Openweight	Yuan Hua (CHN)	Lee Hsiao-Hung (TPE)	(JPN)
Openweight	Yuan Hua (CHN)	Lee Hsiao-Hung (TPE)	Shon Hyun-Me (KOR)

=== Medals table ===
Rank	Nation	Gold	Silver	Bronze	Total
1	Japan	6	6	4	16
2	South Korea	6	3	6	15
3	China	4	2	7	13
4	Chinese Taipei	0	3	6	9
5	Mongolia	0	1	6	7
6	Kazakhstan	0	1	2	3
7	Hong Kong	0	0	1	1
Totals (7 entries)		16	16	32	64
