= Otsuji =

Otsuji (written: 尾辻) is a Japanese surname. Notable people with the surname include:

- Hidehisa Otsuji (尾辻 秀久, born 1940), Japanese politician
- Kanako Otsuji (尾辻 かな子, born 1974), Japanese politician and activist
- Taisuke Otsuji (尾辻 泰介), Japanese judoka
- Taiichi Otsuji (尾辻 泰一), Japanese engineer
