= Ayad =

- Pronunciation: Arabic: [ˈʔajaːd]
- Gender: Male
- Language: Arabic

Origin
- Meaning: Benefit, Blessings, Powerful

Other names
- Variant form: Həyat (Azeri)

Ayad (Arabic: إيّاد) is both an Arabic given name and a surname. Notable people with the name include:

== Given name ==
- Ayad Al Adhamy (born 1985), Musician and Record Producer
- Ayad Alkadhi (born 1971), Iraqi artist
- Ayad Allawi (born 1945), Iraqi politician
- Ayad Lamdassem (born 1981), Spanish long-distance runner
- Ayad Rahim (born 1962), Iraqi-American journalist
- Ayad al-Samarrai (born 1946), Iraqi politician

== Surname ==
- Ahmad Ayad (born 1991), Iraqi footballer
- Alber Saber Ayad (born 1985), Egyptian blogger
- Mohammed Ali Ayad (born 1978), Qatari judoka

== See also ==
- Həyat
