= Lee Hsiao-hung =

Taiwanes Olympic judoka

Personal information
- Born: 11 February 1979 (age 47) Taipei, Taiwan
- Occupation: Judoka
- Height: 1.83 m (6 ft 0 in)
- Weight: 120 kg (265 lb)

Sport
- Country: Taiwan
- Sport: Judo
- Weight class: +72 kg, +78 kg, Open

Achievements and titles
- Olympic Games: R16 (2000)
- World Champ.: 9th (2001)
- Asian Champ.: (silver) (1996, 1998)
Medal record
Women's judo
Representing Chinese Taipei
Asian Games
Silver medal – second place	1998 Bangkok	+78 kg
Asian Championships
Silver medal – second place	1996 Ho Chi Minh	Open
Bronze medal – third place	1993 Macau	Open
Bronze medal – third place	1996 Ho Chi Minh	+72 kg
Bronze medal – third place	1997 Manila	Open
Bronze medal – third place	1997 Manila	+72 kg
Bronze medal – third place	1999 Wenzhou	+78 kg
Bronze medal – third place	2000 Osaka	Open
Bronze medal – third place	2003 Jeju	Open
World Juniors Championships
Bronze medal – third place	1998 Cali	+78 kg
Summer Universiade
Bronze medal – third place	2003 Jeju	Open
East Asian Games
Silver medal – second place	2001 Osaka	+78 kg
Bronze medal – third place	2001 Osaka	Open

Profile at external databases
- IJF: 53033
- JudoInside.com: 3493
- Updated on 10 January 2023

Lee Hsiao-hung (Chinese: 李 曉虹; pinyin: Lǐ Xiǎohóng; born 11 February 1979 in Taipei) is a Taiwanese judoka, who competed in the women's heavyweight category. She picked up a total of thirteen medals in her career, including a silver from the 1998 Asian Games in Bangkok and a bronze in the openweight from the 2003 Summer Universiade in Jeju City, South Korea, and represented her nation Chinese Taipei in two editions of the Olympic Games (2000 and 2004).

Lee made her official debut at the 2000 Summer Olympics in Sydney, where she competed in the women's half-heavyweight class (78 kg). Lee opened her match with a more satisfying victory over Bulgaria's Tsvetana Bozhilova by an ippon, before she conceded with a shido penalty and thereby lost her next bout to Brazil's Priscila Marques because of the judges' decision (yusei gachi).

When South Korea hosted the 2002 Asian Games in Busan, Lee mounted her chances from a silver medal triumph in Bangkok four years earlier to pick up another one in the over-78 kg division, but slipped it away in a painful bronze medal defeat to Mongolia's Erdene-Ochiryn Dolgormaa by points on waza-ari. The following year, at the 2003 Summer Universiade in Jeju City, Lee ceased her medal drought to earn a bronze in the women's openweight.

At the 2004 Summer Olympics in Athens, Lee qualified for her second Chinese Taipei squad in the women's heavyweight class (+78 kg), by granting a re-allocated quota from the International Judo Federation. Unlike her previous Olympics, Lee sought revenge to thwart Dolgormaa on the tatami in the opening match since her bronze medal defeat from the Asian Games two years earlier, but she fell behind 2–1 on yuko against her opponent and never recovered until the five-minute bout ended.
