= Yuan Hua =

Yuan Hua may refer to:

- Yuan Hua (judoka), Chinese judoka and Olympic champion
- Yuen Wah (Mandarin: Yuan Hua), Hong Kong actor
