= Taiichi =

- Gender: Male

Origin
- Origin: Japanese
- Meaning: Different meanings depending on the kanji used

Taiichi (written: 泰一 or 耐一) is a masculine Japanese given name. Notable people with the name include:

- Taiichi Ohno (大野 耐一) (1912–1990), Japanese businessman
- Tochinonada Taiichi (栃乃洋 泰一) (born 1974), Japanese sumo wrestler
- Taiichi Otsuji (尾辻 泰一) (born 1959), Japanese engineer
