= Tatsuhiro =

- Gender: Male

Origin
- Origin: Japanese
- Meaning: Different meanings depending on the kanji used

Tatsuhiro (written: 龍弘, 辰寛, 達弘, 達裕, 立裕, 立禮, 竜拓 or 竜洋) is a masculine Japanese given name. Notable people with the name include:

- Hosokawa Tatsuhiro (細川 立禮; 1755–1835), Japanese daimyō
- Tatsuhiro Muramoto (村元 辰寛; born 1976), Japanese judoka
- Tatsuhiro Nishimoto (西本 竜洋; born 1980), Japanese footballer
- Tatsuhiro Oshiro (大城 立裕; born 1925), Japanese writer and playwright
- Tatsuhiro Sakamoto (坂元 達裕; born 1996), Japanese footballer
- Tatsuhiro Shibata (柴田 竜拓; born 1993), Japanese baseball player
- Tatsuhiro Tamura (田村 龍弘; born 1994), Japanese baseball player
- Tatsuhiro Yonemitsu (米満 達弘; born 1986), Japanese sport wrestler

== Fictional characters ==
- Tatsuhiro Satō (佐藤 達広), protagonist of the manga series Welcome to the N.H.K.
