= Muramoto =

Muramoto (written: 村本 or 村元) is a Japanese surname. Notable people with the surname include:

- Hiro Muramoto (村本 博之; c.1966 – 2010), Japanese photojournalist
- Kana Muramoto (村元 哉中; born 1993), Japanese figure skater
- Satsuki Muramoto (村元 小月; born 1990), Japanese figure skater
- Tatsuhiro Muramoto (村元 辰寛; born 1976), Japanese judoka
