= Mayumi Yamashita =

Japanese judoka (born 1975)

Personal information
- Born: 22 November 1975 (age 50)
- Occupation: Judoka

Sport
- Country: Japan
- Sport: Judo
- Weight class: +78 kg

Achievements and titles
- Olympic Games: (bronze) (2000)
- World Champ.: 9th (2001)
- Asian Champ.: (bronze) (2000)
Medal record
Women's judo
Representing Japan
Olympic Games
Bronze medal – third place	2000 Sydney	+78 kg
Asian Championships
Bronze medal – third place	2000 Osaka	+78 kg
East Asian Games
Silver medal – second place	2001 Osaka	Open
Summer Universiade
Silver medal – second place	1999 Palma de Mallorca	Open

Profile at external databases
- IJF: 53183
- JudoInside.com: 1063
- Updated on 2 June 2023

Mayumi Yamashita (山下 まゆみ, Yamashita Mayumi; born 22 November 1975) is a Japanese judoka.

Yamashita is from Takayama, Gifu and began judo when she was in second grade. After graduating from Tohwa University, she began working for the Osaka Prefectural Police. In 2000, Yamashita won the All-Japan Championships and the All-Japan Weight Class Championships (全日本選抜柔道体重別選手権大会, Zennihon senbatsu jūdō taijūbetsu senshuken taikai) and was chosen to represent Japan in the 2000 Olympic Games held in Sydney. There she defeated Christine Cicot by Osotogari to win a bronze medal.

Yamashita retired after the Kodokan Cup (講道館杯, Kōdōkan-hai) competition in 2003.

== Achievements ==
- 1997 - All-Japan Championships (Openweight only) 3rd

- All-Japan University Championships (Openweight only) 2nd
- All-Japan University Weight Class Championships (+78 kg) 3rd

- 1998 - All-Japan Weight Class Championships (+78 kg) 2nd
- 1999 - Fukuoka International Championships (+78 kg) 1st

- Universiade (Openweight) 2nd

- 2000 - Olympic Games (+78 kg) 3rd

- Asian Championships (+78 kg) 3rd
- Fukuoka International Championships (+78 kg) 3rd
- All-Japan Championships (Openweight only) 1st
- All-Japan Weight Class Championships (+78 kg) 1st

- 2001 - East Asian Games (Openweight) 2nd

- Fukuoka International Championships (+78 kg) 3rd
- All-Japan Championships (Openweight only) 2nd
- All-Japan Weight Class Championships (+78 kg) 2nd

- 2002 - All-Japan Weight Class Championships (+78 kg) 2nd
