= Judo at the 1998 Asian Games – Men's 73 kg =

Judo competition

Men's 73 kg at the 1998 Asian Games
- Venue: Thammasat Gymnasium 1
- Date: 8 December 1998
- Competitors: 17 from 17 nations

Medalists
gold medal	Khaliuny Boldbaatar	Mongolia
silver medal	Kenzo Nakamura	Japan
bronze medal	Kim Dae-wook	South Korea
bronze medal	Andrey Shturbabin	Uzbekistan

The men's 73 kilograms (Lightweight) competition at the 1998 Asian Games in Bangkok was held on 8 December 1998 at the Thammasat Gymnasium 1.

== Schedule ==
All times are Indochina Time (UTC+07:00)

Date	Time	Event
Tuesday, 8 December 1998	14:00	Round 1
Tuesday, 8 December 1998	14:00	Round 2
Tuesday, 8 December 1998	14:00	Quarterfinals
Tuesday, 8 December 1998	14:00	Repechage
Tuesday, 8 December 1998	14:00	Semifinals
Tuesday, 8 December 1998	14:00	Finals

== Results ==
Legend

- IPP — Won by ippon
- KOK — Won by koka
- WAZ — Won by waza-ari
- WO — Won by walkover
- YUK — Won by yuko

=== Main bracket ===
==== Final ====
Final
Khaliuny Boldbaatar (MGL)	KOK
Kenzo Nakamura (JPN)

==== Top half ====
Round 1

Round 2
Tawfik Al-Suleiman (JOR)
Khaliuny Boldbaatar (MGL)	IPP
John Baylon (PHI)	IPP
Iyad Mohsen (PLE)
Alisher Karimov (TJK)
Iun Wai Meng (MAC)	WO
Anantasak Suklit (THA)
Xie Jianhua (CHN)	IPP

Quarterfinals
Khaliuny Boldbaatar (MGL)	IPP
John Baylon (PHI)
Iun Wai Meng (MAC)
Xie Jianhua (CHN)	IPP

Semifinals
Khaliuny Boldbaatar (MGL)	IPP
Xie Jianhua (CHN)

==== Bottom half ====
Round 1
Kenzo Nakamura (JPN)	WAZ
Andrey Shturbabin (UZB)

Round 2
Kenzo Nakamura (JPN)	IPP
Đinh Quốc Hùng (VIE)
Yerlan Alpysbayev (KAZ)
Behrouz Parhizgar (IRI)	IPP
Chen Chih-ping (TPE)	WAZ
Wepa Abdullaýew (TKM)
Kot Siu (HKG)
Kim Dae-wook (KOR)	IPP

Quarterfinals
Kenzo Nakamura (JPN)	IPP
Behrouz Parhizgar (IRI)
Chen Chih-ping (TPE)
Kim Dae-wook (KOR)	WAZ

Semifinals
Kenzo Nakamura (JPN)	YUK
Kim Dae-wook (KOR)

=== Repechage ===
Repechage 1
Andrey Shturbabin (UZB)	IPP
Đinh Quốc Hùng (VIE)

Repechage 2
Tawfik Al-Suleiman (JOR)
John Baylon (PHI)	IPP
Anantasak Suklit (THA)	IPP
Iun Wai Meng (MAC)
Andrey Shturbabin (UZB)	IPP
Behrouz Parhizgar (IRI)
Kot Siu (HKG)
Chen Chih-ping (TPE)	IPP

Repechage 3
John Baylon (PHI)
Anantasak Suklit (THA)	IPP
Andrey Shturbabin (UZB)	YUK
Chen Chih-ping (TPE)

Bronze medals
Anantasak Suklit (THA)
Kim Dae-wook (KOR)	IPP
Andrey Shturbabin (UZB)	YUK
Xie Jianhua (CHN)
