= Mularoni =

Mularoni is a surname. Notable people with the surname include:

- Antonella Mularoni (born 1961), Sammarinese politician
- Diego Mularoni (born 1979), Sammarinese swimmer
- Loris Mularoni (born 1976), Sammarinese judoka
- Marcello Mularoni (born 1998), Sammarinese footballer
- Mariella Mularoni (born 1962), Sammarinese politician
