= Taisuke =

- Gender: Male

Origin
- Origin: Japanese
- Meaning: Different meanings depending on the kanji used

Taisuke (written: 泰介, 泰輔, 泰右, 泰舗, 泰佑, 退助, 大介, 大輔 or 太亮) is a masculine Japanese given name. Notable people with the name include:

- Taisuke Akiyoshi (秋吉 泰佑; born 1989), Japanese footballer
- Taisuke Itagaki (板垣 退助; 1837–1919), Japanese politician
- Taisuke Matsugae (松ヶ枝 泰介; born 1982), Japanese footballer
- Taisuke Miyazaki (宮崎 泰右; born 1992), Japanese footballer
- Taisuke Mizuno (水野 泰輔; born 1993), Japanese footballer
- Taisuke Muramatsu (村松 大輔; born 1989), Japanese footballer
- Taisuke Nakamura (中村 太亮; born 1989), Japanese footballer
- Taisuke Okuno (奥野 泰舗; born 1977), Japanese mixed martial artist
- Taisuke Otsuji (尾辻 泰介), Japanese judoka
- Taisuke Sato (佐藤 泰介; born 1943), Japanese politician
- Taisuke Yamaoka (山岡 泰輔), Japanese professional baseball player
