= Jang Sung-ho (judoka) =

South Korean judoka (born 1978)

Personal information
- Born: 12 January 1978 (age 48)
- Occupation: Judoka

Korean name
- Hangul: 장성호
- Hanja: 張盛晧
- RR: Jang Seongho
- MR: Chang Sŏngho

Sport
- Country: South Korea
- Sport: Judo
- Weight class: –100 kg

Achievements and titles
- Olympic Games: (silver) (2004)
- World Champ.: (silver) (1999)
- Asian Champ.: (gold) (1999, 2005, 2006)
Medal record
Men's judo
Representing South Korea
Olympic Games
Silver medal – second place	2004 Athens	‍–‍100 kg
World Championships
Silver medal – second place	1999 Birmingham	‍–‍100 kg
Bronze medal – third place	2001 Munich	‍–‍100 kg
Asian Games
Gold medal – first place	2006 Doha	‍–‍100 kg
Silver medal – second place	2002 Busan	‍–‍100 kg
Asian Championships
Gold medal – first place	1999 Wenzhou	‍–‍100 kg
Gold medal – first place	2005 Tashkent	‍–‍100 kg
Silver medal – second place	2003 Jeju	‍–‍100 kg
Silver medal – second place	2004 Almaty	‍–‍100 kg
Silver medal – second place	2008 Jeju	‍–‍100 kg
Bronze medal – third place	1999 Wenzhou	Open
East Asian Games
Gold medal – first place	2001 Osaka	‍–‍100 kg
World Juniors Championships
Gold medal – first place	1996 Porto	+95 kg
Summer Universiade
Gold medal – first place	2001 Beijing	Open
Silver medal – second place	2001 Beijing	‍–‍100 kg

Profile at external databases
- IJF: 154
- JudoInside.com: 3673
- Updated on 30 May 2023

Jang Sung-ho (born 12 January 1978) is a male South Korean judoka who won a silver medal at the 2004 Summer Olympics in Athens. He also won a gold medal at the ‍–‍100 kg category of the 2006 Asian Games.

Jang was a flag bearer at the 2008 Summer Olympics in Beijing.
