= 1997 Asian Judo Championships =

Judo competition

The 1997 Asian Judo Championships were held in Manila, Philippines 22 November to 23 November 1997.

== Medal overview ==
=== Men's events ===
Event	Gold	Silver	Bronze
Extra-lightweight (60 kg)	Kozo Sekiguchi (JPN)	Yeh Hsin-Hung (TPE)	Tariel Kaziev (KAZ)
Extra-lightweight (60 kg)	Kozo Sekiguchi (JPN)	Yeh Hsin-Hung (TPE)	Kang Myong-Chang (PRK)
Half-lightweight (65 kg)	Kim Jong-Won (KOR)	Pankaj Sharma (IND)	Ryuji Sonoda (JPN)
Half-lightweight (65 kg)	Kim Jong-Won (KOR)	Pankaj Sharma (IND)	Kai Kang (CHN)
Lightweight (71 kg)	Kwak Dae-Sung (KOR)	Khaliuny Boldbaatar (MGL)	Takehisa Iwakawa (JPN)
Lightweight (71 kg)	Kwak Dae-Sung (KOR)	Khaliuny Boldbaatar (MGL)	Pae Song-Nam (PRK)
Half-middleweight (78 kg)	Yoon Dong-Sik (KOR)	Farkhod Turaev (UZB)	Kwak Ok-Chol (PRK)
Half-middleweight (78 kg)	Yoon Dong-Sik (KOR)	Farkhod Turaev (UZB)	Ruslan Seilkhanov (KAZ)
Middleweight (86 kg)	Cho Byung-Ok (KOR)	Kosei Arikawa (JPN)	Teng Guangyin (CHN)
Middleweight (86 kg)	Cho Byung-Ok (KOR)	Kosei Arikawa (JPN)	Mussa Zalpulayev (KAZ)
Half-heavyweight (95 kg)	Sergey Shakimov (KAZ)	Park Sung-Keun (KOR)	Wei Fuouiang (CHN)
Half-heavyweight (95 kg)	Sergey Shakimov (KAZ)	Park Sung-Keun (KOR)	Teruya Ishida (JPN)
Heavyweight (+95 kg)	Jun Konno (JPN)	Ochir Odgerel (MGL)	Huang Ho-Suei (TPE)
Heavyweight (+95 kg)	Jun Konno (JPN)	Ochir Odgerel (MGL)	Vyacheslav Berduta (KAZ)
Openweight	Katsuyuki Masuchi (JPN)	Park Sung-Keun (KOR)	Huang Ho-Suei (TPE)
Openweight	Katsuyuki Masuchi (JPN)	Park Sung-Keun (KOR)	Vyacheslav Berduta (KAZ)

=== Women's events ===
Event	Gold	Silver	Bronze
Extra-lightweight (48 kg)	Yoo Hi-Joon (KOR)	Atsuko Nagai (JPN)	Li Lingling (CHN)
Extra-lightweight (48 kg)	Yoo Hi-Joon (KOR)	Atsuko Nagai (JPN)	Yu Shu-Chen (TPE)
Half-lightweight (52 kg)	Kye Sun-Hui (PRK)	Kim Hae-Sook (KOR)	He Ji (CHN)
Half-lightweight (52 kg)	Kye Sun-Hui (PRK)	Kim Hae-Sook (KOR)	Shinko Sato (JPN)
Lightweight (56 kg)	Ri Myong-Hwa (PRK)	Zheng Linli (CHN)	Jeon Soh-Young (KOR)
Lightweight (56 kg)	Ri Myong-Hwa (PRK)	Zheng Linli (CHN)	Masako Otsuka (JPN)
Half-middleweight (61 kg)	Jung Sung-Sook (KOR)	Kie Kusakabe (JPN)	Marina Mikheyeva (UZB)
Half-middleweight (61 kg)	Jung Sung-Sook (KOR)	Kie Kusakabe (JPN)	Li Shufang (CHN)
Middleweight (66 kg)	Song Jianfeng (CHN)	Natsuko Sano (JPN)	Wu Meiling (TPE)
Middleweight (66 kg)	Song Jianfeng (CHN)	Natsuko Sano (JPN)	Kim Myong-Hui (PRK)
Half-heavyweight (72 kg)	Li Yanfu (CHN)	Yeh Wen-Hua (TPE)	Saki Yoshida (JPN)
Half-heavyweight (72 kg)	Li Yanfu (CHN)	Yeh Wen-Hua (TPE)	Olesýa Nazarenko (TKM)
Heavyweight (+72 kg)	Miho Ninomiya (JPN)	Shon Hyun-Me (KOR)	Lee Hsiao-Hung (TPE)
Heavyweight (+72 kg)	Miho Ninomiya (JPN)	Shon Hyun-Me (KOR)	Sharma Bittu (IND)
Openweight	Miho Ninomiya (JPN)	Li Yanfu (CHN)	Nadežda Želtakowa (TKM)
Openweight	Miho Ninomiya (JPN)	Li Yanfu (CHN)	Lee Hsiao-Hung (TPE)

=== Medals table ===
Rank	Nation	Gold	Silver	Bronze	Total
1	South Korea	6	4	1	11
2	Japan	5	4	6	15
3	China	2	2	6	10
4	North Korea	2	0	4	6
5	Kazakhstan	1	0	5	6
6	Chinese Taipei	0	2	6	8
7	Mongolia	0	2	1	3
8	India	0	1	1	2
8	Uzbekistan	0	1	1	2
10	Turkmenistan	0	0	2	2
Totals (10 entries)		16	16	33	65
