= Khaliuny Boldbaatar =

Mongolian judoka (born 1971)

Personal information
- Native name: Халиуны Болдбаатар
- Nationality: Mongolia
- Born: 20 October 1971 (age 54) Ulaanbaatar, Mongolia
- Height: 172 cm (5 ft 8 in)

Sport
- Country: Mongolia
- Sport: Judo
- Weight class: 71 kg

Achievements and titles
- Olympic finals: 7th (1992) 5th (1996)
- World finals: 5th (1997)
Medal record
Men's Judo
Representing Mongolia
Asian Games
Gold medal – first place	1998 Bangkok	-73 kg
Bronze medal – third place	1994 Hiroshima	-71 kg
Asian Championships
Silver medal – second place	1991 Osaka	-71 kg
Silver medal – second place	1997 Manila	-71 kg
Silver medal – second place	1999 Wenzhou	-73 kg
Bronze medal – third place	1995 New Delhi	-71 kg
Bronze medal – third place	2001 Ulaanbaatar	-73 kg
Universiade
Gold medal – first place	1999 Palma de Mallorca	-73 kg
East Asian Games
Silver medal – second place	1997 Busan	-78 kg
Men's sambo
World Championships
Gold medal – first place	1998 Kaliningrad	‍–‍74 kg

Khaliuny Boldbaatar (Mongolian: Халиуны Болдбаатар; born October 20, 1971) is a Mongolian former Olympic judoka.

== Career ==
He competed for Mongolia at the 1992 Summer Olympics in Barcelona at the age of 20, in Judo--Men's Lightweight (71 kg), and came in tied for 7th.

Boldbaatar also competed for Mongolia at the 1996 Summer Olympics in Atlanta at the age of 24 in Judo--Men's Lightweight (71 kg), and came in tied for 5th.

Boldbaatar won the men's 73 kg division's gold medal at the 1998 Asian Games in Bangkok, by defeating the reigning Olympic and World Champion Kenzo Nakamura of Japan a score koka.
