= 2001 Asian Judo Championships =

Judo competition in Mongolia

The 2001 Asian Judo Championships were held in Ulaanbaatar, Mongolia from 14 April to 15 April 2001.

== Medal summary ==
=== Men ===
Event	Gold	Silver	Bronze
Extra lightweight −60 kg	Masoud Haji Akhondzadeh; Iran	Choi Min-ho; South Korea	Tatsuaki Egusa; Japan
Extra lightweight −60 kg	Masoud Haji Akhondzadeh; Iran	Choi Min-ho; South Korea	Dorjpalamyn Narmandakh; Mongolia
Half lightweight −66 kg	Arash Miresmaeili; Iran	Michihiro Omigawa; Japan	Won Yong-choi; North Korea
Half lightweight −66 kg	Arash Miresmaeili; Iran	Michihiro Omigawa; Japan	Ryu Jung-suk; South Korea
Lightweight −73 kg	Masashi Nitta; Japan	Kim Jae-hoon; South Korea	Khaliuny Boldbaatar; Mongolia
Lightweight −73 kg	Masashi Nitta; Japan	Kim Jae-hoon; South Korea	Rauvan Inatillayev; Kazakhstan
Half middleweight −81 kg	Chu Sung-hoon; South Korea	Damdinsürengiin Nyamkhüü; Mongolia	Mohammad Mehdi Zakeri; Iran
Half middleweight −81 kg	Chu Sung-hoon; South Korea	Damdinsürengiin Nyamkhüü; Mongolia	Takashi Ono; Japan
Middleweight −90 kg	Park Sung-keun; South Korea	Alisher Boqiev; Tajikistan	Tsend-Ayuushiin Ochirbat; Mongolia
Middleweight −90 kg	Park Sung-keun; South Korea	Alisher Boqiev; Tajikistan	Tadayoshi Takeshita; Japan
Half heavyweight −100 kg	Tomokazu Inoue; Japan	Lee Joon-hoon; South Korea	Abbas Fallah; Iran
Half heavyweight −100 kg	Tomokazu Inoue; Japan	Lee Joon-hoon; South Korea	Dastan Primkulov; Kazakhstan
Heavyweight +100 kg	Takumi Saruwatari; Japan	Choi Sung-won; South Korea	Yeldos Ikhsangaliyev; Kazakhstan
Heavyweight +100 kg	Takumi Saruwatari; Japan	Choi Sung-won; South Korea	Ochiryn Odgerel; Mongolia
Openweight	Kota Ueguchi; Japan	Erkin Tuyakov; Kazakhstan	Abbas Fallah; Iran
Openweight	Kota Ueguchi; Japan	Erkin Tuyakov; Kazakhstan	Ochiryn Odgerel; Mongolia

=== Women ===
Event	Gold	Silver	Bronze
Extra lightweight −48 kg	Ri Kyong-ok; North Korea	Kang Sin-hye; South Korea	Erdenechimegiin Gereltuyaa; Mongolia
Extra lightweight −48 kg	Ri Kyong-ok; North Korea	Kang Sin-hye; South Korea	Yu Ying-ying; Chinese Taipei
Half lightweight −52 kg	Yuki Yokosawa; Japan	Jang Jae-sim; South Korea	Roongtawan Jindasing; Thailand
Half lightweight −52 kg	Yuki Yokosawa; Japan	Jang Jae-sim; South Korea	Sholpan Kaliyeva; Kazakhstan
Lightweight −57 kg	Khishigbatyn Erdenet-Od; Mongolia	Ri Myong-hwa; North Korea	Min Kyung-soon; South Korea
Lightweight −57 kg	Khishigbatyn Erdenet-Od; Mongolia	Ri Myong-hwa; North Korea	Mayumi Yamada; Japan
Half middleweight −63 kg	Ayumi Tanimoto; Japan	Nurgul Tagayeva; Kazakhstan	Ji Kyong-sun; North Korea
Half middleweight −63 kg	Ayumi Tanimoto; Japan	Nurgul Tagayeva; Kazakhstan	Lim Jung-sook; South Korea
Middleweight −70 kg	Haruko Kazato; Japan	Je Min-jung; South Korea	Wang Hsiang-wen; Chinese Taipei
Middleweight −70 kg	Haruko Kazato; Japan	Je Min-jung; South Korea	Olesýa Nazarenko; Turkmenistan
Half heavyweight −78 kg	Choi Sook-ie; South Korea	Mizuho Matsuzaki; Japan	Nasiba Salaýewa; Turkmenistan
Half heavyweight −78 kg	Choi Sook-ie; South Korea	Mizuho Matsuzaki; Japan	Sambuugiin Dashdulam; Mongolia
Heavyweight +78 kg	Midori Shintani; Japan	Choi Sook-ie; South Korea	Juan Hsin-yi; Chinese Taipei
Heavyweight +78 kg	Midori Shintani; Japan	Choi Sook-ie; South Korea	None awarded
Openweight	Midori Shintani; Japan	Choi Sook-ie; South Korea	Juan Hsin-yi; Chinese Taipei
Openweight	Midori Shintani; Japan	Choi Sook-ie; South Korea	Erdene-Ochiryn Dolgormaa; Mongolia

== Medal table ==
Rank	Nation	Gold	Silver	Bronze	Total
1	Japan	9	2	4	15
2	South Korea	3	9	3	15
3	Iran	2	0	3	5
4	Mongolia	1	1	8	10
5	North Korea	1	1	2	4
6	Kazakhstan	0	2	4	6
7	Tajikistan	0	1	0	1
8	Chinese Taipei	0	0	4	4
9	Turkmenistan	0	0	2	2
10	Thailand	0	0	1	1
Totals (10 entries)		16	16	31	63
