= 1996 Asian Judo Championships =

Judo competition

The 1996 Asian Judo Championships were held in Ho Chi Minh City, Vietnam 9 to 10 November 1996.

== Medal overview ==
=== Men's events ===
Event	Gold	Silver	Bronze
Extra-lightweight (60 kg)	Dorjpalamyn Narmandakh (MGL)	Park Young-Kyun (KOR)	Yeh Hsin-hung (TPE)
Extra-lightweight (60 kg)	Dorjpalamyn Narmandakh (MGL)	Park Young-Kyun (KOR)	Gerjan Omarbaev (KAZ)
Half-lightweight (65 kg)	Zeinolabedin Haghani (IRI)	Tomoo Torii (JPN)	U. Erdenebaatar (MGL)
Half-lightweight (65 kg)	Zeinolabedin Haghani (IRI)	Tomoo Torii (JPN)	Lee Sung-Hun (KOR)
Lightweight (71 kg)	Kwak Dae-Sung (KOR)	Akhat Achirov (KAZ)	Huang Chen Yao (TPE)
Lightweight (71 kg)	Kwak Dae-Sung (KOR)	Akhat Achirov (KAZ)	Kazem Sarikhani (IRI)
Half-middleweight (78 kg)	Vladimir Shmakov (UZB)	Cho In-Chul (KOR)	Otsuji Taisuke (JPN)
Half-middleweight (78 kg)	Vladimir Shmakov (UZB)	Cho In-Chul (KOR)	Ruslan Seilkhanov (KAZ)
Middleweight (86 kg)	Armen Bagdasarov (UZB)	Arikawa Kosei (JPN)	Ao Tegen (CHN)
Middleweight (86 kg)	Armen Bagdasarov (UZB)	Arikawa Kosei (JPN)	Jeon Ki-Young (KOR)
Half-heavyweight (95 kg)	Sergey Shakimov (KAZ)	Kim Chul-Jung (PRK)	Alireza Dalir (IRI)
Half-heavyweight (95 kg)	Sergey Shakimov (KAZ)	Kim Chul-Jung (PRK)	Kim Hee-Soo (KOR)
Heavyweight (+95 kg)	Liu Shenggang (CHN)	Fukai Shigekazu (JPN)	Mahmoudreza Miran (IRI)
Heavyweight (+95 kg)	Liu Shenggang (CHN)	Fukai Shigekazu (JPN)	Vadim Sergeev (KGZ)
Openweight	Mahmoudreza Miran (IRI)	Liu Shenggang (CHN)	Dmitry Solovyov (UZB)
Openweight	Mahmoudreza Miran (IRI)	Liu Shenggang (CHN)	Choi Hong-Hee (KOR)

=== Women's events ===
Event	Gold	Silver	Bronze
Extra-lightweight (48 kg)	Pae Dong-suk (KOR)	Atsuko Nagai (JPN)	Yu Shu-chen (TPE)
Extra-lightweight (48 kg)	Pae Dong-suk (KOR)	Atsuko Nagai (JPN)	Jin Shujiao (CHN)
Half-lightweight (52 kg)	He Ji (CHN)	Kazue Nanjo (JPN)	Meeta Sharma (IND)
Half-lightweight (52 kg)	He Ji (CHN)	Kazue Nanjo (JPN)	Kim Hee-Jong (KOR)
Lightweight (56 kg)	Wang Shuyan (CHN)	Yang Sun-Ae (PRK)	Lee Won-Jung (KOR)
Lightweight (56 kg)	Wang Shuyan (CHN)	Yang Sun-Ae (PRK)	Chiyori Tateno (JPN)
Half-middleweight (61 kg)	Jung Sung-Sook (KOR)	Nakahashi Harumi (JPN)	Qin Yuying (CHN)
Half-middleweight (61 kg)	Jung Sung-Sook (KOR)	Nakahashi Harumi (JPN)	Olga Artamonova (KGZ)
Middleweight (66 kg)	Wang Xianbo (CHN)	Kim Myong-Hui (PRK)	Noriko Matsuo (JPN)
Middleweight (66 kg)	Wang Xianbo (CHN)	Kim Myong-Hui (PRK)	Nourtazina Janat (KAZ)
Half-heavyweight (72 kg)	Yoshida Saki (JPN)	Tang Ling (CHN)	Yevgeniya Bogunova (KAZ)
Half-heavyweight (72 kg)	Yoshida Saki (JPN)	Tang Ling (CHN)	Kang Min-Jung (KOR)
Heavyweight (+72 kg)	Yuan Hua (CHN)	Shon Hyun-Me (KOR)	Miho Ninomiya (JPN)
Heavyweight (+72 kg)	Yuan Hua (CHN)	Shon Hyun-Me (KOR)	Lee Hsiao-hung (TPE)
Openweight	Yuan Hua (CHN)	Lee Hsiao-hung (TPE)	Kim Sung-Young (KOR)
Openweight	Yuan Hua (CHN)	Lee Hsiao-hung (TPE)	Miho Ninomiya (JPN)

=== Medals table ===
Rank	Nation	Gold	Silver	Bronze	Total
1	China	6	2	3	11
2	South Korea	3	3	8	14
3	Iran	2	0	3	5
4	Uzbekistan	2	0	1	3
5	Japan	1	6	5	12
6	Kazakhstan	1	1	4	6
7	Mongolia	1	0	1	2
8	North Korea	0	3	0	3
9	Chinese Taipei	0	1	4	5
10	Kyrgyzstan	0	0	2	2
11	India	0	0	1	1
Totals (11 entries)		16	16	32	64
