= Kenzo Nakamura =

Japanese judoka (born 1973)

Personal information
- Born: 18 October 1973 (age 52)
- Occupation: Judoka

Sport
- Country: Japan
- Sport: Judo
- Weight class: –‍71 kg, –‍73 kg

Achievements and titles
- Olympic Games: (gold) (1996)
- World Champ.: (gold) (1997)
- Asian Champ.: (gold) (1995, 2000)
Medal record
Men's judo
Representing Japan
Olympic Games
Gold medal – first place	1996 Atlanta	‍–‍71 kg
World Championships
Gold medal – first place	1997 Paris	‍–‍71 kg
Asian Games
Silver medal – second place	1998 Bangkok	‍–‍73 kg
Asian Championships
Gold medal – first place	1995 New Delhi	‍–‍71 kg
Gold medal – first place	2000 Osaka	‍–‍73 kg
East Asian Games
Silver medal – second place	1997 Busan	‍–‍71 kg
Summer Universiade
Gold medal – first place	1995 Fukuoka	‍–‍71 kg

Profile at external databases
- IJF: 188
- JudoInside.com: 1034
- Updated on 4 June 2023

Kenzo Nakamura (中村兼三, Nakamura Kenzō; born 18 October 1973) is a retired judoka who won a gold medal at the 1996 Summer Olympics. He is the younger brother of 1993 World Judo Championships gold medalist Yoshio Nakamura and 1996 Olympic silver medalist Yukimasa Nakamura.

== Biography ==
Nakamura was born in Fukuoka, Fukuoka Prefecture, Japan. He entered Tokai University in 1992, and was successful in several judo competitions, winning a gold medal at the 1995 Summer Universiade in his hometown of Fukuoka, and a gold medal at the 1995 Asian Judo Championships in New Delhi, India. He entered Asahi Kasei after graduating, and won the All-Japan Judo Championships in 1996 to gain a spot on the Japanese Olympic judo team for the 1996 Summer Olympics, where he won a close decision victory over Kwak Dae-Sung of South Korea to receive a gold medal. Both Nakamura and Kwak were unaggressive throughout the match, and Kwak gained a lead in points after a warning was issued to Nakamura for inactivity. However, Kwak was penalized in turn for an illegal move with only three seconds remaining in the match, and Nakamura won the gold medal with a 2-1 decision in his favor.

Nakamura won several more tournaments after his first trip to the Olympics, most notably a gold medal at the 1997 World Judo Championships and three consecutive victories in the -73 kg division of the All-Japan Championships from 1998 to 2000. However, he failed to get past the third round at the 1999 World Judo Championships, and lost in the fourth round of the 2000 Summer Olympics and in the third round of the repechage. He won the Kodokan Cup in the -81 kg division the same year, but lost in the semi-finals and bronze medal match of the 2001 World Judo Championships to end up in 5th place. Nakamura retired in 2003 after winning the All-Japan Championships for the 5th time in 2002, and winning the Jigoro Kano Cup in 2003. He began working as an instructor for the Asahi Kasei judo team in 2004, and has served as a coach for the All-Japan junior and senior teams.
