= Salim Abanoz =

Turkish judoka (born 1969)

Personal information
- Born: 1 August 1969 (age 56)
- Occupation: Judoka

Sport
- Sport: Judo
Medal record
Men's judo
European Championships
| Bronze medal – third place | 1994 Gdansk | 65 kg |

Profile at external databases
- JudoInside.com: 649

Salim Abanoz (born 1 August 1969) is a Turkish judoka. He competed in the men's lightweight event at the 1996 Summer Olympics.

== Achievements ==
| Year | Tournament | Place | Weight class |
|---|---|---|---|
| 1994 | European Judo Championships | 3rd | Half lightweight (65 kg) |
