= Hiroomi Fujita =

Japanese judoka

Medal record

Representing Japan

Men's Judo

East Asian Games
Gold medal – first place	1997 Busan	-86 kg

Hiroomi Fujita (藤田 博臣, Fujita Hiroomi; born 23 February 1976) is a Japanese judoka.

Fujita is from Goshogawara, Aomori. He began judo at the junior high school days and won gold medal at World Junior Championships in 1994, World University Championships in 1996, East Asian Games in 1997, and so on.

After graduation from Tokai University, He belonged to Asahi Kasei.

Fujita retired in 2000.
