= 1999 Asian Judo Championships =

Judo competition

The 1999 Asian Judo Championships were held in Wenzhou, China 25 June to 26 June 1999.

== Medal overview ==
=== Men's events ===
Event	Gold	Silver	Bronze
Extra-lightweight (60 kg)	Jung Bu-kyung (KOR)	Alisher Mukhtarov (UZB)	Tatsuaki Egusa (JPN)
Extra-lightweight (60 kg)	Jung Bu-kyung (KOR)	Alisher Mukhtarov (UZB)	Masoud Akhondzadeh (IRI)
Half-lightweight (66 kg)	Arash Miresmaeili (IRI)	G. Nurmuhammedow (TKM)	Mansur Jumaev (UZB)
Half-lightweight (66 kg)	Arash Miresmaeili (IRI)	G. Nurmuhammedow (TKM)	Zhang Buanjun (CHN)
Lightweight (73 kg)	Min Sung-ho (KOR)	Khaliuny Boldbaatar (MGL)	Egamnazar Akbarov (UZB)
Lightweight (73 kg)	Min Sung-ho (KOR)	Khaliuny Boldbaatar (MGL)	Denis Korobkov (KGZ)
Half-middleweight (81 kg)	Kwak Ok-chol (PRK)	Kazem Sarikhani (IRI)	Farkhod Turaev (UZB)
Half-middleweight (81 kg)	Kwak Ok-chol (PRK)	Kazem Sarikhani (IRI)	Kim Ki-su (KOR)
Middleweight (90 kg)	Armen Bagdasarov (UZB)	Masaru Tanabe (JPN)	Alexey Alyapin (KAZ)
Middleweight (90 kg)	Armen Bagdasarov (UZB)	Masaru Tanabe (JPN)	Li Zhiqiang (CHN)
Half-heavyweight (100 kg)	Jang Sung-ho (KOR)	Khosrow Dalir (IRI)	Shigeru Kubota (JPN)
Half-heavyweight (100 kg)	Jang Sung-ho (KOR)	Khosrow Dalir (IRI)	Mikhail Sokolov (UZB)
Heavyweight (+100 kg)	Hiroaki Takahashi (JPN)	Pan Song (CHN)	Mahmoud Miran (IRI)
Heavyweight (+100 kg)	Hiroaki Takahashi (JPN)	Pan Song (CHN)	Vyacheslav Berduta (KAZ)
Openweight	Pan Song (CHN)	Keigo Takamori (JPN)	Jang Sung-ho (KOR)
Openweight	Pan Song (CHN)	Keigo Takamori (JPN)	Mahmoud Miran (IRI)

=== Women's events ===
Event	Gold	Silver	Bronze
Extra-lightweight (48 kg)	Cha Hyon-Hyang (PRK)	Tomoe Makabe (JPN)	Jin Shujiao (CHN)
Extra-lightweight (48 kg)	Cha Hyon-Hyang (PRK)	Tomoe Makabe (JPN)	Yu Shu-Chen (TPE)
Half-lightweight (52 kg)	Kye Sun-Hui (PRK)	Liu Yuxiang (CHN)	Kazue Nagai (JPN)
Half-lightweight (52 kg)	Kye Sun-Hui (PRK)	Liu Yuxiang (CHN)	Jang Jae-Sim (KOR)
Lightweight (57 kg)	Wang Shuyan (CHN)	Ri Myong-Hwa (PRK)	Ayako Okazaki (JPN)
Lightweight (57 kg)	Wang Shuyan (CHN)	Ri Myong-Hwa (PRK)	Suzanna Akhmedova (UZB)
Half-middleweight (63 kg)	Sun Xiaofang (CHN)	Olesýa Nazarenko (TKM)	Chigusa Minami (JPN)
Half-middleweight (63 kg)	Sun Xiaofang (CHN)	Olesýa Nazarenko (TKM)	Kim Hwa-Soo (KOR)
Middleweight (70 kg)	Choi Young-Hee (KOR)	Qin Dongya (CHN)	Nadežda Želtakowa (TKM)
Middleweight (70 kg)	Choi Young-Hee (KOR)	Qin Dongya (CHN)	Saki Yoshida (JPN)
Half-heavyweight (78 kg)	Yin Yufeng (CHN)	Hsu Hui-Yu (TPE)	Chika Teshima (JPN)
Half-heavyweight (78 kg)	Yin Yufeng (CHN)	Hsu Hui-Yu (TPE)	Lee So-Yeon (KOR)
Heavyweight (+78 kg)	Zhang Qingli (CHN)	Kim Seon-Young (KOR)	Kanae Suzuki (JPN)
Heavyweight (+78 kg)	Zhang Qingli (CHN)	Kim Seon-Young (KOR)	Lee Hsiao-Hung (TPE)
Openweight	Zhang Qingli (CHN)	Kim Seon-Young (KOR)	Sambuu Dashdulam (MGL)
Openweight	Zhang Qingli (CHN)	Kim Seon-Young (KOR)	Lee Hsiao-Hung (TPE)

=== Medals table ===
Rank	Nation	Gold	Silver	Bronze	Total
1	China	6	3	3	12
2	South Korea	4	2	5	11
3	North Korea	3	1	0	4
4	Japan	1	3	8	12
5	Iran	1	2	3	6
6	Uzbekistan	1	1	5	7
7	Turkmenistan	0	2	1	3
8	Chinese Taipei	0	1	3	4
9	Mongolia	0	1	1	2
10	Kazakhstan	0	0	2	2
11	Kyrgyzstan	0	0	1	1
Totals (11 entries)		16	16	32	64
