= Krzysztof Wojdan =

Polish judoka

Krzysztof Wojdan (born 22 May 1968, Tarnów) is a Polish judoka. He is a 1996 Olympian. He trains UKS Grot Kraków. He competed in the men's lightweight event at the 1996 Summer Olympics.

== Achievements ==
Year	Tournament	Place	Weight class
1994	European Judo Championships	7th	Lightweight (71 kg)
