= Lee Sung-hun =

South Korean judoka

Medal record

Representing South Korea

Men's Judo

Asian Championships
Bronze medal – third place	1996 Ho Chi Minh City	-65 kg

- Lee Sung-hun
- Hangul: 이성훈
- RR: I Seonghun
- MR: I Sŏnghun

Lee Sung-hun is a South Korean judoka.

He won Asian bronze medal in the half-lightweight division in 1996 Asian Judo Championships.
