= Andrei Golban =

Moldovan judoka

Medal record

Men's judo

Representing Moldova

European Championships
Silver medal – second place	1998 Oviedo	73 kg

Andrei Golban (born 17 March 1974) is a Moldovan judoka. He competed in the men's lightweight event at the 1996 Summer Olympics.

== Achievements ==
Year	Tournament	Place	Weight class
1999	European Judo Championships	5th	Lightweight (73 kg)
1998	European Judo Championships	2nd	Lightweight (73 kg)
1995	European Judo Championships	5th	Lightweight (71 kg)
1994	European Judo Championships	5th	Half lightweight (65 kg)
