= Pan Song =

Chinese judoka (born 1975)

Medal record

Representing China

Men's Judo

World Championships
Bronze medal – third place	1997 Paris	+95 kg
Bronze medal – third place	1999 Birmingham	+100 kg

Asian Games
Bronze medal – third place	1998 Bangkok	+100 kg

Asian Championships
Gold medal – first place	1999 Wenzhou	Open
Silver medal – second place	1999 Wenzhou	+100 kg

East Asian Games
Gold medal – first place	1997 Busan	Open
Silver medal – second place	2001 Osaka	Open

Pan Song (Chinese: 潘松; pinyin: Pān Sōng, born November 3, 1975, in Dandong, Liaoning) is a male Chinese judoka who competed in the 2000 Summer Olympics and in the 2004 Summer Olympics.

In 2000 he finished seventh in the heavyweight competition. Four years later he was eliminated in the second round of the 2004 heavyweight tournament.
