= Atsuko Nagai =

Japanese judoka (born 1974)

Personal information
- Born: 14 January 1974 (age 52)
- Occupation: Judoka

Sport
- Sport: Judo
Medal record
Asian Championships
Gold medal – first place	1995 New Delhi	-48 kg
Gold medal – first place	2000 Osaka	-48 kg
Silver medal – second place	1993 Macau	-48 kg
Silver medal – second place	1996 Ho Chi Minh City	-48 kg
Silver medal – second place	1997 Manila	-48 kg
East Asian Games
Gold medal – first place	1997 Busan	-48 kg
Universiade
Gold medal – first place	1999 Palma de Mallorca	-48 kg

Profile at external databases
- JudoInside.com: 2916

Atsuko Nagai (長井 淳子, Nagai Atsuko; born 14 January 1974) is a Japanese judoka. She was born in Ageo, Saitama, and began judo at the age of a second grader. She entered Komatsu Limited after graduating from Saitama University in 1998.

She was known as a rival of Ryoko Tamura. She fought with Tamura 10 times and was defeated 10 times, but never by Ippon.

In 2000, after Tamura won gold medal at Olympic Games, Nagai retired.

As of 2008, Nagai coaches judo at Komatsu Limited, and Ayumi Tanimoto, one of her pupil, inherits the skill of Uchimata that Nagai was good at.
