= Sebastian Pereira =

Brazilian judoka (born 1976)

Personal information
- Born: 17 July 1976 (age 49) Nova Iguaçu, Brazil

Sport
- Sport: Judo
Medal record
Men's judo
Representing Brazil
Pan American Games
Bronze medal – third place	1999 Winnipeg	–73 kg
South American Games
Gold medal – first place	2002 Rio de Janeiro	–73 kg
World Championships
Bronze medal – third place	1999 Birmingham	–73 kg

Sebastian Pereira (born 17 July 1976) is a Brazilian judoka. He competed in the men's lightweight event at the 1996 Summer Olympics.
