= Sun Fuming =

Chinese judoka (born 1974)

Personal information
- Born: 14 April 1974 (age 52)
- Occupation: Judoka

Sport
- Country: China
- Sport: Judo
- Weight class: +72 kg, +78 kg

Achievements and titles
- Olympic Games: (gold) (1996)
- World Champ.: (gold) (2003)
- Asian Champ.: (gold) (2000, 2002)
Medal record
Women's judo
Representing China
Olympic Games
Gold medal – first place	1996 Atlanta	+72 kg
Bronze medal – third place	2004 Athens	+78 kg
World Championships
Gold medal – first place	2003 Osaka	+78 kg
Silver medal – second place	1995 Chiba	Open
Bronze medal – third place	1997 Paris	+72 kg
Asian Games
Gold medal – first place	2002 Busan	+78 kg
Asian Championships
Gold medal – first place	2000 Osaka	Open
East Asian Games
Gold medal – first place	1997 Busan	+72 kg
Gold medal – first place	2001 Osaka	Open
Summer Universiade
Bronze medal – third place	1995 Fukuoka	Open

Profile at external databases
- IJF: 53028
- JudoInside.com: 889
- Updated on 31 May 2023

Sun Fuming (simplified Chinese: 孙福明; traditional Chinese: 孫福明; pinyin: Sūn Fúmíng; born 14 April 1974, in Xifeng, Tieling, Liaoning) is a female Chinese judoka who competed in the 1996 Summer Olympics and in the 2004 Summer Olympics.

== Career ==
Sun won the gold medal in the heavyweight (+72 kg) class in 1996. In 2000 she was unable to achieve another Olympic medal due to her injury.
