= Sergey Kolesnikov (judoka) =

Russian judoka

Personal information
- Nationality: Russian
- Born: 28 August 1968 (age 56)

Sport
- Sport: Judo

Sergey Kolesnikov (born 28 August 1968) is a Russian judoka. He competed in the men's lightweight event at the 1996 Summer Olympics.
