= Thomas Schleicher =

Austrian judoka (1972–2001)

Personal information
- Born: 21 November 1972 Salzburg, Austria
- Died: 2 November 2001 (aged 28) Salzburg, Austria
- Occupation: Judoka

Sport
- Sport: Judo
Medal record
Men's judo
Representing Austria
European Championships
Silver medal – second place	1996 The Hague	71 kg
Bronze medal – third place	1995 Birmingham	71 kg

Profile at external databases
- JudoInside.com: 3220

Thomas Schleicher (21 November 1972 – 2 November 2001) was an Austrian judoka. He competed in the men's lightweight event at the 1996 Summer Olympics. He was later sentenced to five years in prison for drug trafficking; he committed suicide in prison.

== Achievements ==
Year	Tournament	Place	Weight class
1996	European Judo Championships	2nd	Lightweight (71 kg)
1995	World Judo Championships	7th	Lightweight (71 kg)
1995	European Judo Championships	3rd	Lightweight (71 kg)
1994	European Judo Championships	7th	Lightweight (71 kg)
1994	Goodwill Games	2nd	Lightweight (71 kg)
