= Kim Seon-young (judoka) =

South Korean Olympic judoka

Personal information
- Born: 23 February 1979 (age 47)
- Occupation: Judoka

Korean name
- Hangul: 김선영
- RR: Gim Seonyeong
- MR: Kim Sŏnyŏng

Sport
- Country: South Korea
- Sport: Judo
- Weight class: +78 kg

Achievements and titles
- Olympic Games: (bronze) (2000)
- Asian Champ.: (silver) (1999, 2000)
Medal record
Women's judo
Representing South Korea
Olympic Games
Bronze medal – third place	2000 Sydney	+78 kg
Asian Championships
Silver medal – second place	1999 Wenzhou	+78 kg
Silver medal – second place	2000 Osaka	+78 kg
Bronze medal – third place	1996 Ho Chi Minh	Open

Profile at external databases
- IJF: 53185
- JudoInside.com: 9985
- Updated on 2 June 2023

Kim Seon-young (born 23 February 1979) is a South Korean former judoka who competed in the 2000 Summer Olympics.
