= Choi Sook-ie =

South Korean Olympic judoka

Personal information
- Born: 17 February 1980 (age 46) Incheon, South Korea
- Occupation: Judoka
- Height: 1.72 m (5 ft 8 in)
- Weight: 95 kg (209 lb)

Korean name
- Hangul: 최숙이
- RR: Choe Suki
- MR: Ch'oe Sugi

Sport
- Country: South Korea
- Sport: Judo
- Weight class: –78 kg, +78 kg, Open

Achievements and titles
- Olympic Games: 7th (2004)
- World Champ.: (bronze) (1999)
- Asian Champ.: (gold) (2001)
Medal record
Women's judo
Representing South Korea
World Championships
Bronze medal – third place	1999 Birmingham	Open
Asian Games
Silver medal – second place	2002 Busan	+78 kg
Asian Championships
Gold medal – first place	2001 Ulaanbaatar	–78 kg
Silver medal – second place	2000 Osaka	Open
Silver medal – second place	2001 Ulaanbaatar	Open
Silver medal – second place	2001 Ulaanbaatar	+78 kg
Silver medal – second place	2003 Jeju	+78 kg
Bronze medal – third place	2004 Almaty	+78 kg
World Juniors Championships
Silver medal – second place	1998 Cali	+78 kg
Summer Universiade
Silver medal – second place	2001 Beijing	Open

Profile at external databases
- IJF: 53031
- JudoInside.com: 6222
- Updated on 10 January 2023

Choi Sook-ie (Korean: 최숙이; born 17 February 1980 in Incheon) is a South Korean judoka, who competed in the women's heavyweight category. She picked up a total of fifteen medals in her career, including a silver from the 2002 Asian Games in Busan, and also finished seventh in the over-78 kg division at the 2004 Summer Olympics.

Choi first appeared in the international scene as part of the host nation's squad at the 2002 Asian Games in Busan, where she picked up a silver medal in the over-78 kg division, losing the final match by a waza-ari point to China's Sun Fuming.

At the 2004 Summer Olympics in Athens, Choi qualified for the South Korean squad in the women's heavyweight class (+78 kg), by placing third and receiving a berth from the Asian Championships in Almaty, Kazakhstan. She lost her opening match to Russia's Tea Donguzashvili, who successfully scored an ippon and threw her into the tatami with an obi otoshi (belt drop) nearly twenty seconds before the two-minute mark. In the repechage, Choi redeemed her strength to easily tap Egypt's Samah Ramadan out of the mat with an ippon seoi nage (one-arm shoulder throw) and then earned two yuko points to thwart Italy's Barbara Andolina. Choi's chances of an Olympic bronze medal diminished, as she succumbed to an ippon and a tani otoshi throw from Ukraine's Maryna Prokofyeva in the third round of the draft, relegating Choi to the seventh position.
