= Juan González (judoka) =

Guatemalan judoka

Personal information
- Nationality: Guatemalan
- Born: 9 December 1967 (age 57)

Sport
- Sport: Judo

Juan González (born 9 December 1967) is a Guatemalan judoka. He competed in the men's lightweight event at the 1996 Summer Olympics.
