= Judo at the 2002 Asian Games – Women's +78 kg =

Judo competition

Women's +78 kg at the 2002 Asian Games
- Venue: Gudeok Gymnasium
- Date: 30 September 2002
- Competitors: 6 from 6 nations

Medalists
gold medal	Sun Fuming	China
silver medal	Choi Sook-ie	South Korea
bronze medal	Erdene-Ochiryn Dolgormaa	Mongolia
bronze medal	Paradawdee Pestonyee	Thailand

The women's +78 kilograms (Heavyweight) competition at the 2002 Asian Games in Busan was held on 30 September at the Gudeok Gymnasium.

== Schedule ==
All times are Korea Standard Time (UTC+09:00)

Date	Time	Event
Monday, 30 September 2002	14:00	1 round
Monday, 30 September 2002	14:00	Semifinals
Monday, 30 September 2002	18:00	Finals

== Results ==
Legend

- WO — Won by walkover

=== Main bracket ===
1 round
Sun Fuming (CHN)	1110
Lee Hsiao-hung (TPE)	0001
Erdene-Ochiryn Dolgormaa (MGL)	1000
Paradawdee Pestonyee (THA)	0000

Semifinals
Sun Fuming (CHN)	1000
Midori Shintani (JPN)	0101
Choi Sook-ie (KOR)	0002
Erdene-Ochiryn Dolgormaa (MGL)	0000

Final
Sun Fuming (CHN)	0100
Choi Sook-ie (KOR)	0001

=== Repechage ===
Bronze medal match
Lee Hsiao-hung (TPE)	0030
Erdene-Ochiryn Dolgormaa (MGL)	0100
Paradawdee Pestonyee (THA)	WO
Midori Shintani (JPN)
