= Asuca Hayashi =

Japanese singer (born 1989)

Asuka Hayashi 林 明日香
- Born: May 28, 1989 (age 37)
- Origin: Osaka, Osaka Prefecture, Japan
- Genres: J-pop; R&B; pop-fusion
- Occupations: Singer; songwriter
- Years active: 2003–present
- Label: Toshiba-EMI
- Spouse: Satoshi Ishii (m. 2013; div. 2016)
- Website: asuca.jp

Asuka Hayashi (林 明日香, Hayashi Asuka) (born May 28, 1989) is a Japanese singer who debuted in 2003 at the age of 13. She sings in Japanese and Chinese.

== Early life and education ==
Born and raised in Osaka, Hayashi became a performer after her piano teacher sent a tape of her singing to a music producer.

== Career ==
Impressed with Hayashi's talent, a representative of Toshiba Emi's Southeast Asia division arranged to release her debut single, "ake-kaze", on the same day as its Japanese release.

Her debut album, called "Saku" (咲), was released on the same day in Japan, Taiwan, Hong Kong and Mainland China. She has gained fans throughout Japan, Hong Kong, Taiwan, and the United States.

Her hit song, titled "Chiisaki Mono" or "Make a Wish" (English Version), was used in the sixth Pokémon movie, Pokémon: Jirachi, Wish Maker (Japanese: 七夜の願い星 ジラーチ Nanayo no Negai Boshi; literally "Wishing Star of Seven Nights"). and "Orashion no Tēma ~Tomoni Arukō~" (Oracion's Theme~ Let's Walk Together" was the ending theme to the 20th installation of the Pokémon movie: Pokémon the Movie: I Choose You! Other notable songs include "Hitotsubu no Tane ~Love the Earth~", "Snowdrop", "Jibun Shinjite" and "Mou Ichido Anata ni Aitai".

Hayashi has since recorded in both Japanese and Chinese, collaborating with Chinese instrumentalist Chen Min on the single, "Tsubane ni Naritai".

== Personal life ==
In 2013, Hayashi married judo champion Satoshi Ishii. The couple have one son. They later divorced in 2016.

== Discography ==
=== Albums ===
- [2003.03.21] Saku (咲; Bloom)
- [2004.07.14] Hatsukoi (初戀; First Love)
- [2005.12.14] Chou (蝶; Butterfly)
- [2013.08.21] Golden Best (ゴールデン☆ベスト 林明日香)

=== Mini-Albums ===
- [2005.03.02] Tsunaide (つないで; Tie Together)

=== Singles ===
- [2003.01.22] ake-kaze (Dawn-Wind)
- [2003.03.19] "Haha" (「母」; "Mother")
- [2003.07.09] Chiisaki Mono / Tsubame ni Naritai (小さきもの/燕になりたい; Small Things / Like a Swallow)
- [2003.11.19] Mou Ichido Anata ni Aitai (もう一度あなたに会いたい; I Want to Meet You Again)
- [2003.12.17] Tsubame ni Naritai (Re-Release) (燕になりたい; I Want to Become a Swallow)
- [2004.03.03] Rin no Kuni (凛の国; Stern Country)
- [2004.06.30] SANCTUARY ~Yume no Shima e~ (SANCTUARY ~夢の島へ~; Going to the Dream Island)
- [2004.10.14] Kimi wa Magnolia no Hana no Gotoku / Sayonara wa Yuubae no Naka de (君はマグノリアの花の如く / さよならは夕映えの中で; You Are Like a Magnolia Flower / Goodbye is in the Sunset Glow)
- [2005.03.02] Renka (One Track First Press) (蓮花; Lotus Flower)
- [2005.05.25] Renka (蓮花; Lotus Flower)
- [2005.11.09] Koe (声; 'Voice)
- [2007.03.21] Kokoro no Mama ni (心のままに; Unchanging Heart)
- [2017.07.15] オラシオンのテーマ ～共に歩こう～ (Oracion's Theme ~ Let's Go Together)

=== DVD / VHS ===
- [2003.07.16] Chiisaki Mono (DVD Single) (小さきもの)
- [2003.09.19] Mou Ichido Anta ni Aitai (DVD single) (もう一度あなたに会いたい)

=== Compilation / Other ===
- [2004.05.19] Kikansha Sensei Original Soundtrack (SANCTUARY ~Yume no Shima e~)
- [2005.03.23] Van Son in Tokyo (DVD) (Rin no Kuni Sung Live; Titled "Dat Nuoc Lam Liet")
- [2005.03.30] VENUS JAPAN (Snowdrop)
- [2005.03.30] Minna no Uta Best Hit Collection (DVD) (Snowdrop)
