= Hiroaki Takahashi =

Japanese judoka

Personal information
- Born: 12 April 1976 (age 50)
- Occupation: Judoka

Sport
- Sport: Judo
Medal record
Representing Japan
Men's Judo
Asian Championships
Gold medal – first place	1999 Wenzhou	+100 kg
Silver medal – second place	2005 Tashkent	Open
East Asian Games
Gold medal – first place	2001 Osaka	Open

Profile at external databases
- JudoInside.com: 1048

Hiroaki Takahashi (高橋 宏明, Takahashi Hiroaki; born 12 April 1976) is a retired Japanese judoka.

Takahashi is from Edogawa, Tokyo and belonged to Asahi Kasei after graduation from Chuo University in 1999.

Takahashi was good at Uchimata and Osotogari.

He won a gold medal at the Asian Championships held in Wenzhou, China and silver medal held in Tashkent, Uzbekistan. He was also participate All-Japan Championships 8 times from 2000 to 2007.

Takahashi retired in 2007. Now, he coaches judo at Kodokan.

== Achievements ==
- 1995
  - All-Japan Junior Championships (+95 kg) 1st
- 1996
  - All-Japan University Championships (+100 kg) 3rd
- 1997
  - All-Japan University Championships (+100 kg) 3rd
- 1998
  - All-Japan University Championships (+100 kg) 1st
- 1999
  - Asian Championships (+100 kg) 1st
- 2000
  - Kodokan Cup (+100 kg) 1st
- 2001
  - East Asian Games (Open) 1st
  - Paris Super World Cup (+100 kg) 3rd
  - Kodokan Cup (+100 kg) 2nd
- 2002
  - Kodokan Cup (+100 kg) 1st
- 2003
  - Jigoro Kano Cup (+100 kg) 2nd
- 2004
  - All-Japan Selected Championships (+100 kg) 3rd
  - Kodokan Cup (+100 kg) 2nd
- 2005
  - Asian Championships (Open) 2nd
  - Jigoro Kano Cup (Openweight only) 3rd
  - All-Japan Selected Championships (+100 kg) 2nd
  - Kodokan Cup (+100 kg) 1st
- 2006
  - Jigoro Kano Cup (+100 kg) 2nd
  - All-Japan Selected Championships (+100 kg) 3rd
  - Kodokan Cup (+100 kg) 3rd
