= Jorge Pacce =

Paraguayan judoka

Personal information
- Nationality: Paraguayan
- Born: 31 May 1965 (age 59)

Sport
- Sport: Judo

Jorge Pacce (born 31 May 1965) is a Paraguayan judoka. He competed in the men's lightweight event at the 1996 Summer Olympics.
