= Adja Marieme Diop =

Senegalese judoka (born 1977)

Personal information
- Nationality: Senegalese
- Born: 5 August 1977 (age 47)

Sport
- Sport: Judo

Adja Marieme Diop (born 5 August 1977) is a Senegalese judoka. She competed in the women's heavyweight event at the 2000 Summer Olympics.
