= Vladimer Dgebuadze =

Georgian judoka (born 1970)

Medal record

Men's judo

Representing Georgia

World Championships
Bronze medal – third place	1991 Barcelona	71 kg

European Championships
Gold medal – first place	1993 Athens	71 kg

Vladimer Dgebuadze (Georgian: ვლადიმერ დგებუაძე; born 2 October 1970) is a Georgian judoka. He competed in the men's 71 kg event at the 1996 Summer Olympics.

== Achievements ==
Year	Tournament	Place	Weight class
1993	European Judo Championships	1st	Lightweight (71 kg)
1991	World Judo Championships	3rd	Lightweight (71 kg)
1990	Goodwill Games	3rd	Lightweight (71 kg)
