= Satoshi Ishii =

Croatian mixed martial arts fighter and judoka (born 1986)

Satoshi Ishii 石井慧
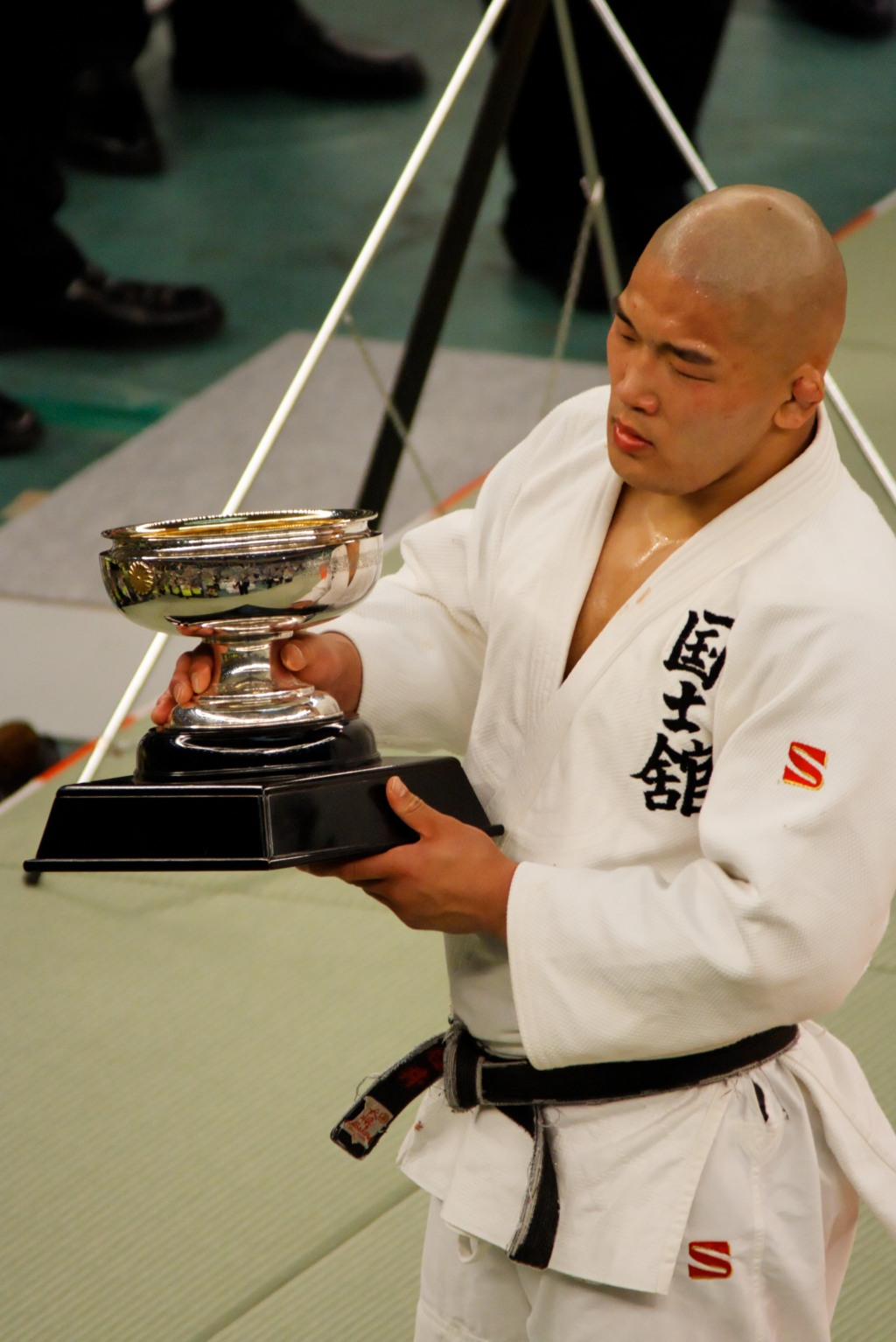
- Ishii in 2008
- Born: December 19, 1986 (age 39); Ibaraki, Osaka, Japan
- Nationality: Croatian (since 2019); Japanese (until 2019)
- Height: 6 ft 0 in (183 cm)
- Weight: 241 lb (109 kg; 17 st 3 lb)
- Division: Light Heavyweight; Heavyweight
- Reach: 74 in (188 cm)
- Style: Judo
- Fighting out of: Zagreb, Croatia
- Team: Cro Cop Squad Gym; Kings MMA; Reign Training Center; Black House i Dash (2009–2010)
- Years active: 2004–2009, 2011-2012 (Judo); 2009–2024 (MMA); 2021–2024 (kickboxing); 2022–2024 (boxing); 2016–2018 (submission wrestling)

Professional boxing record
- Total: 2
- Wins: 1
- Losses: 0
- Draws: 1

Kickboxing record
- Total: 4
- Wins: 3
- By knockout: 1
- Losses: 1

Mixed martial arts record
- Total: 39
- Wins: 25
- By knockout: 3
- By submission: 12
- By decision: 10
- Losses: 13
- By knockout: 6
- By decision: 7
- Draws: 1

Other information
- Boxing record from BoxRec
- Mixed martial arts record from Sherdog
- Judo career
- Weight class: ‍–‍100 kg, +100 kg
- Rank: 6th dan black belt

Judo achievements and titles
- Olympic Games: (gold) (2008)
- Asian Champ.: (silver) (2006)
Medal record
Men's judo
Representing Japan
Olympic Games
Gold medal – first place	2008 Beijing	+100 kg
Asian Games
Silver medal – second place	2006 Doha	‍–‍100 kg
World Juniors Championships
Gold medal – first place	2004 Budapest	‍–‍100 kg
Asian Junior Championships
Gold medal – first place	2004 Doha	‍–‍100 kg
Summer Universiade
Gold medal – first place	2007 Bangkok	Open

Profile at external judo databases
- IJF: 52700
- JudoInside.com: 34348

Satoshi Ishii (Japanese: 石井 慧, Ishii Satoshi; born December 19, 1986) is a Japanese-born Croatian retired mixed martial artist, kickboxer, professional boxer and judoka.

Ishii won the gold medal in Olympic Judo at the Beijing 2008 Summer Olympics, a silver medal at the 2006 Asian Games and two All-Japan Judo Championships representing Japan. Ishii made his professional MMA debut at Dynamite!! 2009 losing to fellow Judoka gold medalist Hidehiko Yoshida by unanimous decision, but currently holds a record of 24–12–1. Ishii is currently under contract with Professional Fighters League. A professional mixed martial artist since 2009, Ishii has also competed for Rizin Fighting Federation and Bellator, and is the current HEAT Heavyweight Champion and SBC Heavyweight Champion.

== Judo career ==
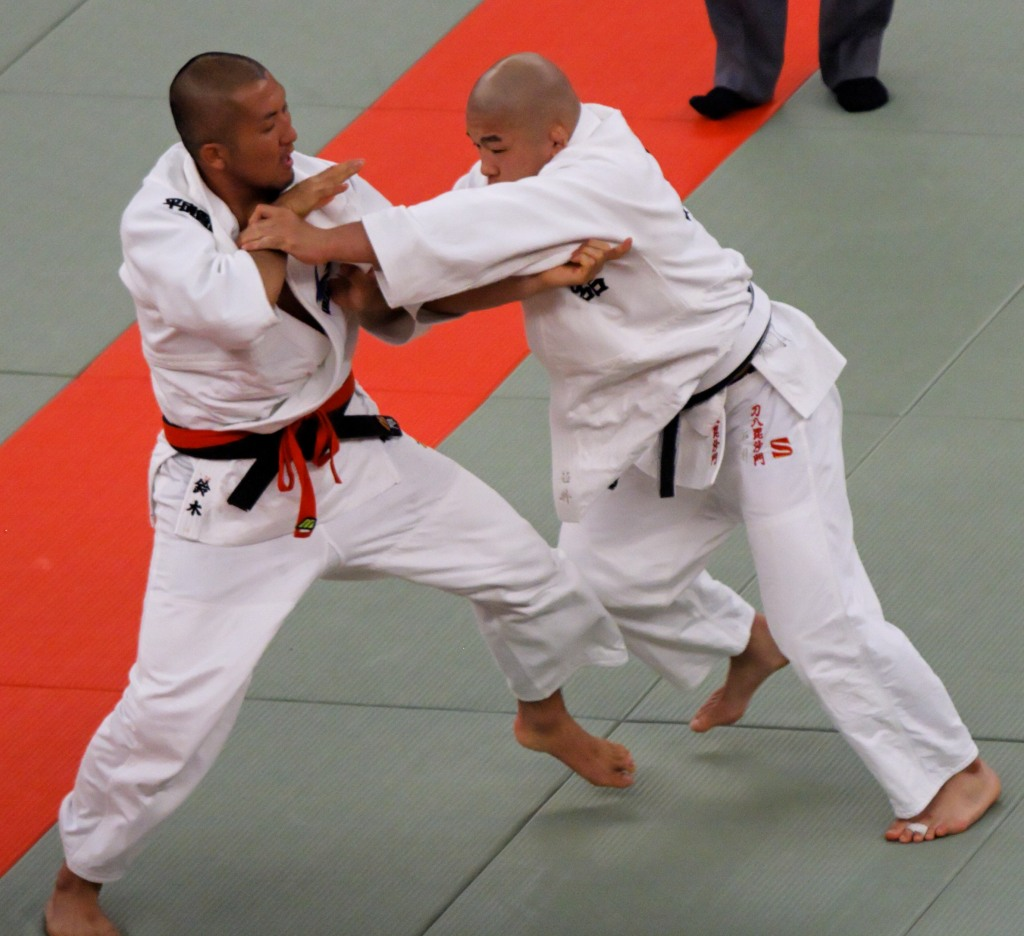
Ishii vs. Keiji Suzuki in 2008

Ishii started Judo under the guidance of his father when he was in fifth grade of elementary school. He attended Kokushikan High School and then Kokushikan University in the Department of Physical Education.

Ishii won a gold medal at the Junior World Championships on 16 October 2004 in Budapest, Hungary. On 2 December 2006 he won a silver medal at the ‍–‍100 kg category of the 2006 Asian Games. On April 29, 2006, and 2008, he won the All-Japan Judo Championships in Tokyo, Japan. With him the Japanese team won the World Judo team competition on 17 November 2007 in Beijing, China, this time in the +100 kg division.

On August 15, 2008, he won a gold medal at the +100 kg category of the Beijing 2008 Summer Olympics. On 30 April 2011 Ishii returned to Judo to compete in the United States Championship in the open division; he won all the matches, securing the gold medal.

== Mixed martial arts career ==
=== Early career ===
After winning the gold medal, Ishii expressed his wishes to apply his talents in the sport of mixed martial arts (MMA) to the dismay of the Japanese Judo Federation. Ishii originally confirmed that he signed a contract with Japanese MMA promotion Fighting and Entertainment Group (FEG) and was rumored to debut in early 2009 in their fight series, DREAM.

Japanese newspaper Sports Nippon then reported that Ishii would make his ring debut on December 31, 2009, at the annual K-1 Premium Dynamite!! event at the Saitama Super Arena. However, Ishii announced that he rejected FEG's offer, and was planning to pursue his MMA career in the US' Ultimate Fighting Championship (UFC). He headed to Florida where he trained with one of MMA's top camps American Top Team.

On June 1, 2009, Ishii announced he would join Japanese MMA organization World Victory Road. He officially signed with the organization at a public signing event on June 4, 2009. On September 14, 2009, it was announced that Ishii would make his MMA debut against fellow Olympian judo gold medalist Hidehiko Yoshida. Although the fight was originally to take place at World Victory Road's New Year show on December 31, when that event was cancelled, the fight was moved to DREAM's Dynamite!! 2009 card on New Year's Eve as a co-promoted show. Ishii, who was a large favorite in the fight, was dominated in the first round by the more-experienced Yoshida, taking many strikes including a right overhand that staggered the newcomer, along with a series of knees and uppercuts from the clinch. Ishii, however, came back with a more competitive second round, but took a point deduction after illegally kneeing Yoshida in the groin. Ishii continued to find his range in the third round with punches, but ultimately lost via unanimous decision.

For his second fight, Ishii faced New Zealand heavyweight kickboxing champion Tafa "Thumper" Misipati on May 15, 2010, in Auckland, New Zealand. The fight was the main event at the ETK production X-plosion: New Zealand vs. Japan. Ishii won via submission (armbar) in the first round.

In June 2010, Ishii caused controversy during an MMA exhibition match on the undercard of X-1 World Events: Nations Collide in Hawaii. After knocking down his opponent Myles Tynanes at the end of the first-round, Ishii failed to stop punching his downed foe despite the referee's attempts to halt the action. He was subsequently disqualified for his actions.

On September 25, 2010, Ishii fought Ikuhisa Minowa, a shoot wrestler known for facing much larger opponents, at Dream.16 and won via unanimous decision. Ishii's next MMA fight was supposed to be against Antz Nansen at the K-1 World MAX 2010. However, his opponent was changed to Katsuyori Shibata at the last minute. Ishii won via Kimura in the first round.

Ishii continued to train at Black House in Brazil with notable fighters such as Lyoto Machida and Anderson Silva. Prior to Silva's fight with Chael Sonnen Ishii hurt Silva's ribs. Since then he has trained at Mark Muñoz's gym Reign MMA, along with Mayhem Miller, Fabrício Werdum and other notable fighters. Ishii then fought French kickboxing star Jérôme Le Banner in a mixed martial arts bout at the Dynamite!! 2010 New Year's Eve event. He won the fight via unanimous decision.

Ishii was scheduled to make his North America debut for Strikeforce at Strikeforce Challengers 15 against Scott Lighty, but a visa issue stemming from the recent earthquake and tsunami left him unable to leave Japan. Lorenz Larkin took his place in the fight.

In April 2011, it was reported that Ishii would retire from MMA and return to judo. Surprisingly, he said that he plans to earn American citizenship and represent the US at the 2016 Summer Olympics. However, he apparently decided against retiring from MMA as he went on to face former WEC Middleweight Champion Paulo Filho at Amazon Forest Combat 1 on September 14, 2011, in his light heavyweight debut. The fight ended in a controversial draw, with journalists as well as the crowd agreeing that Ishii had won all three rounds.

Satoshi Ishii next competed at Fight For Japan: Genki Desu Ka Omisoko 2011, where he met MMA legend Fedor Emelianenko. He lost the fight via KO in the first round.

=== Japanese circuit ===
==== Inoki Genome Federation ====
After taking a year off from fighting to train following the Emelianenko loss, Ishii signed an exclusive multi fight deal with IGF in Japan. Here he has secured 6 victories in less than a year against former UFC Heavyweight Champion Tim Sylvia, UFC veterans Sean McCorkle, Kerry Schall, Pedro Rizzo and against Jeff Monson.

Ishii then faced Kazuyuki Fujita on December 31, 2013, for the IGF Championship. He won via unanimous decision, became the first IGF Champion. Ishii defeated former UFC fighter Phil De Fries in a non-title bout via unanimous decision at IGF 1 on April 5, 2014, in a full pride rules match as the headline bout on the card. On August 23 at IGF 2, Despite being a heavy favorite due to his years and judo experience Ishii was defeated by UFC, Pride and K-1 veteran Mirko Cro Cop via doctor stoppage, losing the IGF Championship in the process. Ishii was expected to face PRIDE and Strikeforce veteran Sergei Kharitonov at M-1 Challenge 53: Battle in the Celestial Empire on November 11, 2014. However, Ishii withdrew from the fight due to injury.

Ishii faced Mirko Cro Cop in a rematch at December 31, 2014, for the IGF Championship. Early reports had the rematch cancelled due to a rib injury sustained by Ishii. However, in December 2014, it was reported that Ishii would be able to heal up in time to fight Cro Cop, and the rematch was official once again. Ishii lost the fight via TKO at the end of the second round. After suffering back-to-back losses to Cro Cop, Ishii was scheduled to face Nick Rossborough at Inoki Genome Fight 3 on April 11, 2015. He won by a first-round submission. Ishii fought Will Penn in his final IGF appearance, at Inoki Genome Fight 4 on August 29, 2015. He won the fight by a first-round submission.

==== Rizin FF ====
In his debut for the Rizin promotion, Ishii faced Jiří Procházka on December 29, 2015, at Rizin Fighting Federation World (8-men) Tournament. He lost the fight via knockout early in the first round. Ishii made his North American MMA debut against Quinton Jackson on June 24, 2016, at Bellator 157. He lost the fight via split decision. One judge scored the fight 29–28 to Ishii, while the other two judges scored it 29–28 and 30–27 for Jackson. Ishii was scheduled to face Muhammed Lawal at Bellator 169 on December 16, 2016. He lost the fight by unanimous decision. Following his third consecutive loss, Ishii was scheduled to face the long-time mixed martial arts veteran Heath Herring at Rizin 2017 in Yokohama: Sakura on April 16, 2017. He snapped his losing streak with a unanimous decision victory.

=== European circuit ===
Ishii was scheduled to face Ivan Shtyrkov at RCC Boxing Promotions: Russia vs Japan on July 9, 2017. He lost the fight by a first-round technical knockout, as Shtyrkov floored the Olympian with a right straight. Ishii made his first and only Final Fight Championship appearance against Björn Schmiedeberg at Final Fight Championship 30 on October 21, 2017. He won the fight by a first-round submission. Ishii was scheduled to face Rokas Stambrauskas at German MMMA Championship 17 on October 13, 2018. He won the fight by a first-round submission.

==== SBC Heavyweight champion ====
Ishii fought for the Serbian Battle Championship heavyweight title in his debut for the organization, against Tony Lopez at SBC 19 on December 1, 2018. He won the fight by a first-round submission. Ishii made his first SBC heavyweight title defense against Rodrigo Carlos at Serbian Battle Championship 20 on February 16, 2019. He won the fight by a first-round technical knockout. Ishii challenged Cally Gibrainn de Oliveira for the HEAT Heavyweight Championship at HEAT 44 on March 2, 2019. He claimed the title via second-round submission. Ishii was scheduled to face the former KSW champion Fernando Rodrigues at KSW 47: The X-Warriors on March 23, 2019. He won the fight by split decision.

=== Professional Fighters League ===
On January 1, 2019, Ishii revealed that he had signed a contract with Professional Fighters League, and he took part in the second heavyweight regular season. Ishii faced Zeke Tuinei Wily at PFL 3 on June 6, 2019, in his promotional debut. He won the fight by split decision. Ishii faced Jared Rosholt at PFL 6 on August 8, 2019. He lost the fight by unanimous decision. Ishii faced Denis Goltsov in the 2019 heavyweight quarterfinal bout at PFL 9 on October 31, 2019. He lost the fight by majority decision.

=== Second run on European circuit ===
Ishii faced Jake Heun at Rizin 20 on December 31, 2019. He lost the fight via first-round knockout. As his first HEAT title defense, Ishii faced Cleber Souza at HEAT 46 on January 19, 2020. He retained the title via first-round submission. Ishii next faced Stuart Austin for the inaugural EMC Heavyweight Championship at EMC 5 on September 5, 2020. Ishii lost a controversial unanimous decision, to which his team decided to appeal. Ishii faced Pietro Cappelli at EMC 7 on July 3, 2021. He won the fight by a first-round submission.

Ishii was scheduled to face Daniel Spohn at HEAT 50 on May 7, 2022. However, the bout was scrapped after Spohn tested positive for coronavirus. Ishii was instead booked to face Charlie Milner at FNC 6 on June 17, 2022. He won the fight by a first-round knockout.

=== Return to Professional Fighter's League ===
On June 6, 2023, Ishii announced that he had signed a new contract with PFL in order to make his return to the promotion. He competed against Danilo Marques at PFL 8 on August 18, 2023. He lost the fight by unanimous decision. On March 3, 2024, Ishii announced his retirement from MMA competition.

== Kickboxing career ==
On August 3, 2021, it was announced that Ishii had signed with K-1. He was scheduled to make his kickboxing debut against the one-time cruiserweight title challenger Ryo Aitaka at K-1 World GP 2021: Yokohamatsuri on September 20, 2021. Ishii won the fight by unanimous decision, after an extra round was fought.

Ishii was scheduled to make his second professional kickboxing appearance against RUI at K-1 World GP 2021 in Osaka on December 4, 2021. Ishii won the fight by unanimous decision. Ishii took part in the 2022 K-1 openweight tournament, held at K-1: K'Festa 5 on April 3, 2022. He faced BigBang heavyweight champion Kosuke Jitsukata in the tournament quarterfinals. He won the fight by a second-round knockout. Ishii withdrew from the tournament after this bout, due to a rib injury. Ishii faced the former K-1 Heavyweight Champion in a super heavyweight bout at K-1 World GP 2023: K'Festa 6 on March 12, 2023. He lost the fight by unanimous decision, with scores of 30–29, 30–29 and 30–27.

== Professional boxing career ==
Ishii made his professional boxing debut against Shuho Takayama (1–0) on August 14, 2022, as part of the 3150FIGHT vol. 3 event. He won the fight by majority decision. Ishii faced Chang Soo Han on January 6, 2023, as part of the 3150FIGHT vol. 4 event. The fight was ruled a majority decision draw. Ishii announced his retirement from the sport of boxing during the post-fight press conference.

== Submission grappling career ==
Ishii challenged Mason Fowler for the Submission Underground absolute championship at Submission Underground 19 on December 20, 2020. He lost the match by submission in EBI overtime. Ishii returned at Submission Underground 20 on December 30, 2020, to face Craig Jones in the co-main event. He was submitted with a rear-naked choke at 2:08 of regulation time. Ishii then competed against Andy Varela at Submission Underground 21 on March 28, 2021. He lost the match in EBI overtime due to having the least ride-time.

== Personal life ==
Ishii was married for 9 months to Mika, a university student, divorcing in January 2011. In 2013, he married singer Asuka Hayashi. They divorced in 2016. They have one son.

In 2019, Ishii obtained Croatian citizenship and passport and had to give up Japanese citizenship and passport due to Japan's policy against dual citizenship.

== Filmography ==
Year	Title	Role	Notes	Refs.
2012	Here Comes the Boom	Fairgrounds Fighter		
2021	Fuji	Dojo master	Documentary film	
2024	Tokyo Vice	Sato's thug	Season 2	
2025	The Smashing Machine	Enson Inoue		
2026	Atlas King	Ronin		

== Championships and accomplishments ==
Professional mixed martial arts

- Serbian Battle Championship
  - SBC Heavyweight Championship (one time; current)
    - One successful title defense
- Inoki Genome Federation
  - IGF Championship (1 time)
- HEAT
  - HEAT Heavyweight Championship (one time; current)
    - One successful title defense

== Mixed martial arts record ==
Professional record breakdown
39 matches	25 wins	13 losses
By knockout	3	6
By submission	12	0
By decision	10	7
Draws	1	

Res.	Record	Opponent	Method	Event	Date	Round	Time	Location	Notes
Loss	25–13–1	Danilo Marques	Decision (unanimous)	PFL 8 (2023)	August 18, 2023	3	5:00	New York City, New York, United States	
Win	25–12–1	Charlie Milner	TKO (punches)	FNC 6	June 17, 2022	1	0:40	Karlovac, Croatia	
Win	24–12–1	Pietro Cappelli	Submission (north-south choke)	EMC 7	July 3, 2021	1	2:41	Ratingen, Germany	
Loss	23–12–1	Stuart Austin	Decision (unanimous)	EMC 5	September 5, 2020	3	5:00	Düsseldorf, Germany	For the vacant EMC Heavyweight Championship.
Win	23–11–1	Cleber Souza	Submission (armbar)	HEAT 46	January 19, 2020	1	3:24	Tokyo, Japan	Defended the HEAT Heavyweight Championship.
Loss	22–11–1	Jake Heun	KO (punches)	Rizin 20	December 31, 2019	1	1:18	Saitama, Japan	
Loss	22–10–1	Denis Goltsov	Decision (majority)	PFL 9 (2019)	October 31, 2019	2	5:00	Las Vegas, Nevada, United States	2019 PFL Heavyweight Tournament Quarterfinal.
Loss	22–9–1	Jared Rosholt	Decision (unanimous)	PFL 6 (2019)	August 8, 2019	3	5:00	Atlantic City, New Jersey, United States	
Win	22–8–1	Zeke Tuinei Wily	Decision (split)	PFL 3 (2019)	June 6, 2019	3	5:00	Uniondale, New York, United States	
Win	21–8–1	Fernando Rodrigues Jr.	Decision (split)	KSW 47: The X-Warriors	March 23, 2019	3	5:00	Łódź, Poland	
Win	20–8–1	Cally Gibrainn de Oliveira	Submission (kimura)	HEAT 44	March 2, 2019	2	3:54	Nagoya, Japan	Won the HEAT Heavyweight Championship.
Win	19–8–1	Rodrigo Carlos	TKO (punches)	Serbian Battle Championship 20	February 16, 2019	1	1:42	Sombor, Serbia	Defended the SBC Heavyweight Championship.
Win	18–8–1	Tony Lopez	Submission (kneebar)	Serbian Battle Championship 19	December 1, 2018	1	4:42	Novi Sad, Serbia	Won the vacant SBC Heavyweight Championship.
Win	17–8–1	Rokas Stambrauskas	Submission (leg scissor choke)	German MMMA Championship 17	October 13, 2018	1	4:43	Düsseldorf, Germany	
Win	16–8–1	Björn Schmiedeberg	Submission (kimura)	Final Fight Championship 30	October 21, 2017	1	2:36	Linz, Austria	
Loss	15–8–1	Ivan Shtyrkov	TKO (punches)	RCC Boxing Promotions: Russia vs Japan	July 9, 2017	2	3:43	Yekaterinburg, Russia	
Win	15–7–1	Heath Herring	Decision (unanimous)	Rizin 2017 in Yokohama: Sakura	April 16, 2017	2	5:00	Yokohama, Japan	
Loss	14–7–1	Muhammed Lawal	Decision (unanimous)	Bellator 169	December 16, 2016	3	5:00	Dublin, Ireland	
Loss	14–6–1	Quinton Jackson	Decision (split)	Bellator 157: Dynamite 2	June 24, 2016	3	5:00	St. Louis, Missouri, United States	Catchweight (225 lb) bout.
Loss	14–5–1	Jiří Procházka	KO (head kick and knees)	Rizin World Grand Prix 2015: Part 1 - Saraba	December 29, 2015	1	1:36	Saitama, Japan	2015 Rizin World Grand-Prix Quarterfinals.
Win	14–4–1	Will Penn	Submission (rear-naked choke)	Inoki Genome Fight 4	August 29, 2015	1	3:07	Tokyo, Japan	
Win	13–4–1	Nick Rossborough	Submission (kimura)	Inoki Genome Fight 3	April 11, 2015	1	4:22	Tokyo, Japan	
Loss	12–4–1	Mirko Cro Cop	TKO (head kick and punches)	Inoki Bom-Ba-Ye 2014	December 31, 2014	2	5:00	Tokyo, Japan	For the IGF Championship.
Loss	12–3–1	Mirko Cro Cop	TKO (doctor stoppage)	Inoki Genome Fight 2	August 23, 2014	2	2:37	Tokyo, Japan	Lost the IGF Championship.
Win	12–2–1	Philip De Fries	Decision (unanimous)	Inoki Genome Fight 1	April 5, 2014	2	5:00	Tokyo, Japan	Non-title bout.
Win	11–2–1	Kazuyuki Fujita	Decision (unanimous)	Inoki Bom-Ba-Ye 2013	December 31, 2013	3	5:00	Tokyo, Japan	Won the IGF Championship.
Win	10–2–1	Jeff Monson	Decision (majority)	M-1 Challenge 42	October 20, 2013	3	5:00	Saint Petersburg, Russia	
Win	9–2–1	Clayton Jones	TKO (punches)	IGF: GENOME 27	July 20, 2013	1	0:35	Osaka, Japan	
Win	8–2–1	Pedro Rizzo	Decision (unanimous)	IGF: GENOME 26	May 26, 2013	3	5:00	Tokyo, Japan	
Win	7–2–1	Kerry Schall	Submission (armbar)	IGF: GENOME 25	March 20, 2013	1	2:43	Fukuoka, Japan	
Win	6–2–1	Sean McCorkle	Submission (kimura)	IGF: GENOME 24	February 23, 2013	1	2:41	Tokyo, Japan	
Win	5–2–1	Tim Sylvia	Decision (unanimous)	Inoki-Bom-Ba-Ye 2012	December 31, 2012	3	5:00	Tokyo, Japan	
Loss	4–2–1	Fedor Emelianenko	KO (punches)	Fight For Japan: Genki Desu Ka Omisoka 2011	December 31, 2011	1	2:29	Saitama, Japan	Return to heavyweight.
Draw	4–1–1	Paulo Filho	Draw	Amazon Forest Combat 1	September 14, 2011	3	5:00	Manaus, Brazil	Light heavyweight debut.
Win	4–1	Jérôme Le Banner	Decision (unanimous)	Dynamite!! 2010	December 31, 2010	3	5:00	Saitama, Japan	
Win	3–1	Katsuyori Shibata	Technical Submission (kimura)	K-1 World MAX 2010 World Championship Tournament Final	November 8, 2010	1	3:30	Tokyo, Japan	
Win	2–1	Ikuhisa Minowa	Decision (unanimous)	Dream 16	September 25, 2010	2	5:00	Nagoya, Japan	
Win	1–1	Tafa Misipati	Submission (armbar)	X-plosion: New Zealand vs. Japan	May 15, 2010	1	2:42	Auckland, New Zealand	
Loss	0–1	Hidehiko Yoshida	Decision (unanimous)	Dynamite!! The Power of Courage 2009	December 31, 2009	3	5:00	Saitama, Japan	

== Kickboxing record ==
Professional kickboxing record
3 wins (1 (T)KOs, 2 decisions), 1 loss, 0 draws, 0 no contests
Date	Result	Opponent	Event	Location	Method	Round	Time
2023-03-12	Loss	(Japan) Kyotaro Fujimoto	K-1 World GP 2023: K'Festa 6	Tokyo, Japan	Decision (unanimous)	3	3:00
2022-04-03	Win	(Japan) Kosuke Jitsukata	K-1: K'Festa 5, Tournament Quarterfinals	Tokyo, Japan	KO (left straight)	2	1:02
Ishii withdrew from the tournament due to injury.
2021-12-04	Win	(Japan) Rui	K-1 World GP 2021 in Osaka	Osaka, Japan	Decision (unanimous)	3	3:00
2021-09-20	Win	(Japan) Ryo Aitaka	K-1 World GP 2021: Yokohamatsuri	Yokohama, Japan	Ext. R. decision (unanimous)	4	3:00
Legend: Win Loss Draw/no contest Notes

== Professional boxing record ==
2 fights	1 win	0 losses
By decision	1	0
Draws	1	

No.	Result	Record	Opponent	Type	Round, time	Date	Location	Notes
2	Draw	1–0–1	Chang Soo Han	MD	4	6 Jan 2023	EDION Arena Osaka, Osaka, Japan	
1	Win	1–0	Shuho Takayama	MD	4	14 Aug 2022	EDION Arena Osaka, Osaka, Japan	

== Submission grappling record ==
5 matches, 1 win, 1 loss, 3 draws
Result	Record	Opponent	Method	Event	Date	Division	Location
Loss	1–1–3	(United Kingdom) Daniel Strauss	Points	Polaris 8	December 9, 2018	Superfight	(United Kingdom) Cardiff
Win	1–0–3	(United States) Frank Mir	DQ	Quintet 3	October 5, 2018	Superfight	(United States) Las Vegas, NV
Draw	0–0–3	(United States) Geo Martinez	Draw	Quintet 2	July 15, 2018	Absolute	(Japan) Tokyo
Draw	0–0–2	(Brazil) Marcos de Souza	Draw	Quintet	April 11, 2018	Absolute	(Japan) Tokyo
Draw	0–0–1	(Belarus) Vladimir Matyushenko	Draw	Metamoris 7	July 17, 2016	Superfight	(United States) Los Angeles, CA
