= Francisco Rodríguez (Puerto Rican judoka) =

Puerto Rican judoka

Personal information
- Nationality: Puerto Rican
- Born: 20 May 1970 (age 54)

Sport
- Sport: Judo

Francisco Rodríguez (born 20 May 1970) is a Puerto Rican judoka. He competed in the men's lightweight event at the 1996 Summer Olympics.
