= Beatriz Martín =

Spanish judoka

Personal information
- Nationality: Spanish
- Born: 24 September 1974 (age 51) Madrid, Spain

Sport
- Sport: Judo

Beatriz Martín (born 24 September 1974) is a Spanish judoka. She competed in the women's heavyweight event at the 2000 Summer Olympics.
