= Yuan Hua (judoka) =

Chinese judoka (born 1974)

Personal information
- Nationality: Chinese
- Born: 16 April 1974 (age 52) Liaoyang
- Occupation: Judoka

Sport
- Country: China
- Sport: Judo
- Weight class: +78 kg

Achievements and titles
- Olympic Games: (gold) (2000)
- World Champ.: (gold) (2001)
- Asian Champ.: (gold) (1996, 1996, 1998, 2007)
Medal record
Women's judo
Representing China
Olympic Games
Gold medal – first place	2000 Sydney	+78 kg
World Championships
Gold medal – first place	2001 Munich	+78 kg
Silver medal – second place	1999 Birmingham	+78 kg
Bronze medal – third place	1997 Paris	Open
Asian Games
Gold medal – first place	1998 Bangkok	+78 kg
Asian Championships
Gold medal – first place	1996 Ho Chi Minh	Open
Gold medal – first place	1996 Ho Chi Minh	+72 kg
Gold medal – first place	2007 Kuwait City	Open
Bronze medal – third place	2007 Kuwait City	+78 kg
East Asian Games
Gold medal – first place	1997 Busan	Open
Gold medal – first place	2001 Osaka	+78 kg
World Juniors Championships
Gold medal – first place	1992 Buenos Aires	+72 kg
Summer Universiade
Gold medal – first place	1999 Palma de Mallorca	+78 kg
Gold medal – first place	2001 Beijing	+78 kg
Bronze medal – third place	1999 Palma de Mallorca	Open

Profile at external databases
- IJF: 53180
- JudoInside.com: 940
- Updated on 2 June 2023

Yuan Hua (Chinese: 袁华; born 16 April 1974) is a Chinese judoka and Olympic champion. She won a gold medal in the heavyweight division at the 2000 Summer Olympics in Sydney.
