= Estela Riley =

Panamanian judoka

Personal information
- Nationality: Panamanian
- Born: 14 July 1969 (age 56)

Sport
- Sport: Judo

Estela Riley (born 14 July 1969) is a Panamanian judoka. She competed in the women's heavyweight event at the 2000 Summer Olympics.
