= Judo at the 1998 Asian Games – Women's +78 kg =

Judo competition

Women's +78 kg at the 1998 Asian Games
- Venue: Thammasat Gymnasium 1
- Date: 10 December 1998
- Competitors: 6 from 6 nations

Medalists
| gold medal | Yuan Hua | China |
| silver medal | Lee Hsiao-hung | Chinese Taipei |
| bronze medal | Miho Ninomiya | Japan |
| bronze medal | Paradawdee Pestonyee | Thailand |

The women's +78 kilograms (Heavyweight) competition at the 1998 Asian Games in Bangkok was held on 10 December 1998 at the Thammasat Gymnasium 1.

== Schedule ==
All times are Indochina Time (UTC+07:00)

| Date | Time | Event |
|---|---|---|
| Thursday, 10 December 1998 | 14:00 | Quarterfinals |
| Thursday, 10 December 1998 | 14:00 | Repechage |
| Thursday, 10 December 1998 | 14:00 | Semifinals |
| Thursday, 10 December 1998 | 14:00 | Finals |

== Results ==
Legend

- DEC — Won by decision
- IPP — Won by ippon
- WO — Won by walkover
- YUK — Won by yuko

=== Main bracket ===
| Quarterfinals | | Semifinals | | Final |
| | | Şirin Kubaýewa (TKM) |
| Lee Hsiao-hung (TPE) | YUK | Lee Hsiao-hung (TPE) | WO |
| Lee Hyun-kyung (KOR) | | | | Lee Hsiao-hung (TPE) |
| Paradawdee Pestonyee (THA) | | | | Yuan Hua (CHN) | IPP |
| Miho Ninomiya (JPN) | IPP | Miho Ninomiya (JPN) |
| | | Yuan Hua (CHN) | IPP |

=== Repechage ===
Bronze medals
Lee Hyun-kyung (KOR)
Miho Ninomiya (JPN) | DEC
Paradawdee Pestonyee (THA) | WO
Şirin Kubaýewa (TKM)
