= Caroline Curren =

Australian judoka

Personal information
- Nationality: Australian
- Born: 31 October 1962 (age 62); Melbourne, Australia

Sport
- Sport: Judo

Caroline Curren (born 31 October 1962) is an Australian judoka. She competed in the women's heavyweight event at the 2000 Summer Olympics.
