= Hayad =

- Location within Azerbaijan Location within East Zangezur Economic Region
- Coordinates: 40°03′10″N 46°38′37″E
- Country: Azerbaijan
- District: Aghdara
- Time zone: UTC+4 (AZT)

Hayad is a village in the Aghdara District of Azerbaijan. It was previously part of the self-proclaimed Republic of Artsakh's Martakert Province.
