= Erdene-Ochiryn Dolgormaa =

Mongolian Olympic judoka (born 1977)

Personal information
- Full name: Erdene-Ochiryn Dolgormaa
- Nationality: Mongolia
- Born: 26 July 1977 (age 48) Ulaanbaatar, Mongolia
- Height: 1.83 m (6 ft 0 in)
- Weight: 117 kg (258 lb)

Sport
- Sport: Judo
- Event: +78 kg
Medal record
Women's judo
Representing Mongolia
Asian Games
Bronze medal – third place	2002 Busan	+78 kg
Asian Championships
Silver medal – second place	2004 Almaty	+78 kg
Bronze medal – third place	2003 Jeju City	+78 kg

Erdene-Ochiryn Dolgormaa (Mongolian: Эрдэнэ-Очирын Долгормаа; born July 26, 1977, in Ulaanbaatar) is a Mongolian judoka, who competed in the women's heavyweight category. She picked up five medals in her career, including a bronze from the 2002 Asian Games in Busan, and represented her nation Mongolia in the over-78 kg division at the 2004 Summer Olympics.

Dolgormaa made sporting headlines in the international scene at the 2002 Asian Games in Busan, South Korea, where she scored a waza-ari victory over Chinese Taipei's Lee Hsiao-hung to earn a bronze medal in the over-78 kg division.

At the 2004 Summer Olympics in Athens, Dolgormaa qualified for the Mongolian squad in the women's heavyweight class (+78 kg), by placing second and receiving a berth from the Asian Championships in Almaty, Kazakhstan. She thwarted her former rival Lee Hsiao-hung in the opening match with a yuko (15-second hold), before losing out to her next opponent Maryna Prokofyeva of Ukraine by a waza-ari awasete ippon and a kuzure kesa gatame within one minute and sixteen seconds.
