= Pankaj Sharma =

British academic

Pankaj Sharma is a British professor of Clinical Neurology at Royal Holloway College, University of London, and consultant neurologist at Imperial College London. He is director of the Institute of Cardiovascular Research at Royal Holloway (ICR2UL), and formerly head of the Imperial College Cerebrovascular Research Unit (ICCRU) at Imperial College London. His main interest is in identifying genes for stroke, particularly in those of South Asian heritage.

He was president of the British Fulbright Scholars Association and is currently Medical Advisor of the UK national younger stroke survivor charity Different Strokes, co-founder and former treasurer of the South Asian Health Foundation. He is a Fellow of the Medical Society of London, former (founding) editor-in-chief of the Journal of the Royal Society of Medicine Cardiovascular Disease, president of the London Cardiovascular Society, and an expert external advisor to the Parliamentary and Health Service Ombudsman.

== Education ==
Sharma studied medicine at London University and holds two doctorates, a PhD from Gonville and Caius College, University of Cambridge and a Doctorate in Medicine from London University. He was a recipient of a Fulbright Scholarship at Harvard Medical School and Massachusetts General Hospital. He holds a diploma in the history of medicine from the Worshipful Society of Apothecaries. He was elected a Fellow of the Royal College of Physicians in 2007 and is a Royal College examiner.

=== Research ===
He is a researcher in the field of stroke and is particularly interested in its genetical basis. He has established a large international biobank of stroke from the UK, India and the Middle East with the aim of trying to better understand the causes of stroke in ethnic minorities, especially those of South Asian descent.

He is the author of over 100 original papers and his research profile has attracted an H-index of over 100 . He is the co-editor of two books: Stroke Genetics (Springer 2024; 3rd edition) and Clinical Pharmacology (Elsevier 2018) which is now in its twelfth edition.

Sharma is a commentator for news media including the BBC and CNN International on medical issues especially relating to stroke. He has been interviewed on the subject of brain disease in prominent individuals including Ariel Sharon, Michael Schumacher and Jules Bianchi.

=== Awards ===
Sharma received a British Heart Foundation Clinician Scientist award in 1997, and in 2010 he was one of the recipients of the Hind Rattan award.

In 2015, he was named the UK's top Asian doctor at the annual British Indian Awards.

He was awarded an OBE in the King's Birthday Honours List 2025 for services to research in strokes in South Asian people.

== Personal life ==
He was born in Delhi, the son of Kewal Krishan Sharma (Indian Foreign diplomatic service who served under three prime ministers, Nehru, Shastri and Indira Gandhi) and Janak Sharma (Bank of England). Under his grandfather, Bihari Lal Sharma, the family was noted for holding the India licence for Kodak. He is chairman of the UK charity founded by his family, Lotus Partners Foundation. He lists his hobbies as debating, fencing and playing polo, and describes himself as 'generous, disciplined and maverick'. Sharma lives in London with his doctor wife and two children, Aarti and Shyam.

== Private practice ==
Sharma has a neurology private practice at 146 Harley Street.
