= David Kouassi =

Ivorian judoka

Personal information
- Nationality: Ivorian
- Born: 26 June 1970 (age 54)

Sport
- Sport: Judo

David Kouassi (born 26 June 1970) is an Ivorian judoka. He competed in the men's lightweight event at the 1996 Summer Olympics.
