= Nematullo Asranqulov =

Tajikistani judoka

Personal information
- Nationality: Tajikistan
- Born: 1 April 1982 (age 44) Rudaki, Tajik SSR, Soviet Union
- Height: 1.88 m (6 ft 2 in)
- Weight: 90 kg (198 lb)

Sport
- Sport: Judo
- Event: 90 kg
Medal record
Men's judo
Representing Tajikistan
Asian Championships
Silver medal – second place	2007 Kuwait City	90 kg

Nematullo Asranqulov (also Nematullo Asronkulov, Tajik: Нематулло Асронкулов; born 1 April 1982 in Rudaki) is a Tajikistani judoka, who played for the middleweight category. He won a silver medal for his division at the 2007 Asian Judo Championships in Kuwait City, Kuwait, losing out to South Korea's Choi Sun-Ho.

Asranqulov represented Tajikistan at the 2008 Summer Olympics in Beijing, where he competed for the men's middleweight class (90 kg). He lost the first preliminary round match, by a yuko and a kuchiki taoshi (single leg takedown), to Azerbaijan's Elkhan Mammadov.
