= Martin Schmidt (judoka) =

German judoka

Personal information
- Born: 4 July 1969 (age 57)
- Occupation: Judoka

Sport
- Sport: Judo

Profile at external databases
- IJF: 59008
- JudoInside.com: 281

Martin Schmidt (born 4 July 1969) is a German judoka.

== Achievements ==
Year	Tournament	Place	Weight class
1999	European Judo Championships	5th	Lightweight (73 kg)
1998	European Judo Championships	5th	Half lightweight (66 kg)
1996	Olympic Games	7th	Lightweight (71 kg)
1995	European Judo Championships	1st	Lightweight (71 kg)
1991	European Judo Championships	2nd	Extra lightweight (60 kg)
