= Steve Corkin =

New Zealand judoka

Personal information
- Nationality: New Zealand
- Born: 3 November 1963 (age 61); New Plymouth, New Zealand

Sport
- Sport: Judo

Steve Corkin (born 3 November 1963) is a New Zealand judoka. He competed at the 1992 Summer Olympics and the 1996 Summer Olympics.

Corkin later became the coach of the New Zealand national judo team.
