= Akhat Akhirov =

Kazakhstani judoka

Personal information
- Nationality: Kazakhstani
- Born: 8 May 1970 (age 56)

Sport
- Sport: Judo

Akhat Akhirov (born 8 May 1970) is a Kazakhstani judoka. He competed in the men's lightweight event at the 1996 Summer Olympics.
