= Christophe Gagliano =

French judoka (born 1967)

Personal information
- Born: 22 May 1967 (age 59)
- Occupation: Judoka

Sport
- Country: France
- Sport: Judo
- Weight class: –71 kg
- Rank: 7th dan black belt

Achievements and titles
- Olympic Games: (bronze) (1996)
- World Champ.: (silver) (1997)
- European Champ.: (silver) (1995)
Medal record
Men's judo
Representing France
Olympic Games
Bronze medal – third place	1996 Atlanta	‍–‍71 kg
World Championships
Silver medal – second place	1997 Paris	‍–‍71 kg
European Championships
Silver medal – second place	1995 Birmingham	‍–‍71 kg
Bronze medal – third place	1991 Prague	‍–‍71 kg
Bronze medal – third place	1996 The Hague	‍–‍71 kg
Bronze medal – third place	1997 Oostende	‍–‍71 kg

Profile at external databases
- IJF: 3996
- JudoInside.com: 358
- Updated on 4 June 2023

Christophe Gagliano (born 22 May 1967 in Paris) is a French judoka.

== Achievements ==
Year	Tournament	Place	Weight class
1997	World Judo Championships	2nd	Lightweight (71 kg)
1997	European Judo Championships	3rd	Lightweight (71 kg)
1997	Mediterranean Games	1st	Lightweight (71 kg)
1996	Olympic Games	3rd	Lightweight (71 kg)
1996	European Judo Championships	3rd	Lightweight (71 kg)
1995	European Judo Championships	2nd	Lightweight (71 kg)
1991	European Judo Championships	3rd	Half heavyweight (95 kg)
