= Mohammed Ali Ayad =

Qatari judoka (born 1978)

Mohammed Ali Ayad (born 16 May 1978) is a Qatari judoka.

He finished in joint fifth place in the half-heavyweight (100 kg) division at the 2006 Asian Games, having lost to Utkir Kurbanov of Uzbekistan in the bronze medal match.
