= Fiona Iredale =

New Zealand judoka

Fiona Iredale (born 1 December 1967) is a former Olympic athlete from Dundee, Scotland who represented New Zealand in Women's Heavyweight Judo at the 2000 Summer Olympics. She reached the quarter-finals phase of the competition.

She was a tutor for sports and sciences at Waikato Polytechnic and won a bronze medal at the 2000 Commonwealth judo tournament in Canada.

In 2005, she was team manager for the New Zealand judo team, which competed at the world championships that year.
