= Utkir Kurbanov =

Uzbek judoka (born 1983)

Personal information
- Born: 3 February 1983 (age 43)
- Occupation: Judoka

Sport
- Country: Uzbekistan
- Sport: Judo
- Weight class: ‍–‍100 kg

Achievements and titles
- Olympic Games: R32 (2008)
- World Champ.: 5th (2010)
- Asian Champ.: (bronze) (2006, 2007, 2008, 2010)
Medal record
Men's judo
Representing Uzbekistan
Asian Games
Bronze medal – third place	2006 Doha	‍–‍100 kg
Bronze medal – third place	2010 Guangzhou	Open
Asian Championships
Bronze medal – third place	2007 Kuwait City	‍–‍100 kg
Bronze medal – third place	2008 Jeju	‍–‍100 kg
IJF Grand Prix
Silver medal – second place	2010 Abu Dhabi	‍–‍100 kg
Bronze medal – third place	2012 Abu Dhabi	‍–‍100 kg
Bronze medal – third place	2013 Almaty	‍–‍100 kg
Asian Junior Championships
Bronze medal – third place	2001 Ho Chi Minh City	‍–‍90 kg

Profile at external databases
- IJF: 2753
- JudoInside.com: 18572
- Updated on 27 December 2022

Utkir Kurbanov (born 3 February 1983) is an Uzbekistani judoka. He and Askhat Zhitkeyev of Kazakhstan shared the bronze medal at the ‍–‍100 kg category of the 2006 Asian Games.
