= Gulnara Kusherbayeva =

Kazakh judoka

Personal information
- Nationality: Kazakhstani
- Born: 31 August 1971 (age 54) Aktyubinsk, Kazakh SSR, Soviet Union
- Occupation: Judoka

Sport
- Sport: Judo

Profile at external databases
- JudoInside.com: 10159

Gulnara Kusherbayeva (Гульнара Мурсалиевна Кушербаева, born 31 August 1971) is a Kazakhstani judoka. She competed in the women's heavyweight event at the 2000 Summer Olympics.
