= Loris Mularoni =

Sammarinese judoka

Personal information
- Nationality: Sammarinese
- Born: 31 July 1976 (age 48)

Sport
- Sport: Judo

Loris Mularoni (born 31 July 1976) is a Sammarinese judoka. He competed in the men's lightweight event at the 1996 Summer Olympics.
