= Tomoo Torii =

Japanese judoka (born 1973)

Personal information
- Born: 20 May 1973 (age 53)
- Occupation: Judoka

Sport
- Sport: Judo
Medal record
Representing Japan
Men's Judo
Asian Championships
| Silver medal – second place | 1996 Ho Chi Minh City | -65 kg |

Profile at external databases
- IJF: 6569
- JudoInside.com: 2978

Tomoo Torii (鳥居 智男, Torii Tomio) (born May 20, 1973) is a Japanese judoka.

He won Asian silver medal in the half-lightweight division in 1996 Asian Judo Championships. In November 2012 Torii took 5th in the World Sambo Championships in Minsk.
