= Tatsuhiro Muramoto =

Japanese judoka

Personal information
- Born: 4 September 1976 (age 49)
- Occupation: Judoka

Sport
- Sport: Judo
Medal record
Representing Japan
Men's Judo
Asian Championships
Gold medal – first place	2000 Osaka	Open
East Asian Games
Gold medal – first place	2001 Osaka	+100 kg

Profile at external databases
- JudoInside.com: 1032

Tatsuhiro Muramoto (村元 辰寛, Muramoto Tatsuhiro; born 4 September 1976) is a retired Japanese judoka.

Muramoto is from Nagasaki, Nagasaki and began judo at the age of 6. He belonged to Asahi Kasei after graduation from Tenri University in 1999.

Muramoto was good at Uchimata and Harai goshi.

In 2000, he won a gold medal at the Asian Championships held in Osaka, Japan. He was also participate All-Japan Championships 8 times. He was expected to get medal of Olympic Games or World Championships but could not participate by the trouble of the knee since 1995.

Muramoto retired in 2007. Now, he has coached judo at Osaka University of Health and Sport Sciences since 2009.

== Achievements ==
- 1991 - All-Japan Junior high school Championships (+78 kg) 3rd
- 1993 - All-Japan high school Championships (+95 kg) 2nd
- 1994 - World Junior Championships (+95 kg) 3rd

- All-Japan high school Championships (+95 kg) 1st
- Inter-highschool championships (+95 kg) 1st

- 1995 - All-Japan University Championships (+95 kg) 3rd
- 1996 - World Junior Championships (+95 kg) 3rd
- 1997 - All-Japan Championships (Openweight only) 2nd

- Kodokan Cup (+95 kg) 3rd

- 1998 - Paris Super World Cup (+100 kg) 3rd

- All-Japan Selected Championships (+100 kg) 3rd
- All-Japan University Championships (Openweight) 1st

- 1999 - Pacific Rim Championships (+100 kg) 1st

- Jigoro Kano Cup (+100 kg) 3rd
- World Masters Munich (+100 kg) 3rd

- 2000 - Asian Championships (Openweight) 1st

- All-Japan Selected Championships (+100 kg) 2nd

- 2001 - All-Japan Championships (Openweight only) 3rd

- All-Japan Selected Championships (+100 kg) 2nd

- 2002 - Paris Super World Cup (+100 kg) 2nd
- 2003 - Jigoro Kano Cup (+100 kg) 3rd

- All-Japan Selected Championships (+100 kg) 2nd

- 2005 - All-Japan Championships (Openweight only) 2nd
