= Priscila Marques =

Brazilian judoka (born 1978)

Personal information
- Born: May 17, 1978 (age 48) Santos, São Paulo, Brazil

Sport
- Sport: Judo
Medal record
Representing Brazil
Women's Judo
Pan American Games
| Bronze medal – third place | 1999 Winnipeg | Heavyweight |
| Bronze medal – third place | 2007 Rio de Janeiro | Heavyweight |

Priscila Marques (born May 17, 1978) is a female judoka from Brazil, who won the bronze medal in the heavyweight division (+ 78 kg) at the 1999 Pan American Games. She represented her native country at the 2000 Summer Olympics in Sydney, Australia, where she was eliminated in the second round.
