= Amir Reza Ghomi =

Iranian judoka

Amir Ghomi
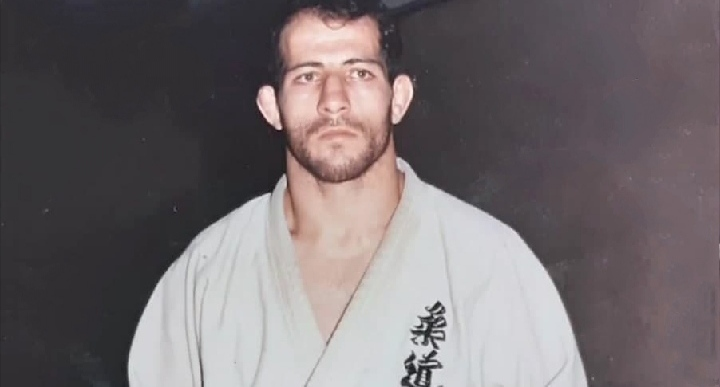
- Ghomi in the Olympic Games

Personal information
- Full name: Amir Reza Ghomi
- Nationality: Iranian
- Born: 1 January 1968 (age 58) Shahr-e Ray
- Height: 165 cm (5 ft 5 in)
- Weight: 75 kg (165 lb)

Sport
- Country: Iran
- Sport: Judo

Amirreza Ghomi (Persian: امیررضا قمی; born 1 January 1968), who is better known as Amir Ghomi (Persian: امیر قمی); He is a former judoka and coach from Iran. He is the first judo Olympian and one of the athletes of the Iranian Judo Federation. After winning the World Judo Championships and participating in international competitions, including the 1996 Atlanta Summer Olympics and the 2000 Sydney Summer Olympics, he also has the World Judo Championship in his sports record.
