= Taiichi Otsuji =

Taiichi Otsuji (尾辻 泰一, Otsuji Taiichi) from Tohoku University, Sendai, Japan was named Fellow of the Institute of Electrical and Electronics Engineers (IEEE) in 2014 for contributions to plasmonic semiconductor integrated device technology for terahertz sensing.
