= Taisuke Otsuji =

Japanese judoka

Personal information
- Occupation: Judoka

Sport
- Sport: Judo
Medal record
Representing Japan
Men's Judo
Asian Championships
Bronze medal – third place	1996 Ho Chi Minh City	-78 kg

Profile at external databases
- JudoInside.com: 2943

Otsuji Taisuke (尾辻 泰介, Otsuji Taisuke) is a Japanese judoka.

He won a bronze medal in the half-middleweight division in 1996 Asian Judo Championships.
