= Andrey Shturbabin =

Uzbekistani judoka (born 1972)

Personal information
- Nationality: Uzbekistani
- Born: 30 May 1972 (age 54)
- Occupation: Judoka
- Height: 175 cm (5 ft 9 in)
- Weight: 73 kg (161 lb)

Sport
- Sport: Judo
Medal record
Men's judo
Representing Uzbekistan
Asian Games
Bronze medal – third place	1998 Bangkok	73 kg
Asian Championships
Bronze medal – third place	2000 Osaka	73 kg

Profile at external databases
- IJF: 719
- JudoInside.com: 3183

Andrey Shturbabin (Андрей Штурбабин, born 30 May 1972) is an Uzbekistani judoka. He competed at the 1996 Summer Olympics and the 2000 Summer Olympics.

== Career ==
He placed 7th in category -71 kg at the 1995 World Championships in Chiba, Japan. He then competed at the 1996 Summer Olympics in Atlanta and lost against bronze medalist Christophe Gagliano in repechage, ending on 7th place. He won silver medal at the 1997 World Military Judo Championship in Dubrovnik, Croatia. He also won bronze medal in -71 kg at the 1998 Asian Games in Bangkok, Thailand. He won another bronze medal in -71 kg at the 2000 Asian Judo Championships in Osaka, Japan. He competed at the 2000 Summer Olympics in Sydney. In 2001, he placed 5th at World Championships in Munich, which is his best result from this particular competition.

In 2018, he became a coach of Iran Judo National team. In the end of 2019 he started working with Slovenian judokas in Judo Club Bežigrad. For many years he was the head coach of the National Judo Team of Uzbekistan. In 2011, the International Judo Federation (IJF) recognized him as the best coach in the world.
