= Kwak Dae-sung =

South Korean judoka

Personal information
- Born: 13 February 1973 (age 53)
- Occupation: Judoka

Korean name
- Hangul: 곽대성
- Hanja: 郭大成
- RR: Gwak Daeseong
- MR: Kwak Taesŏng

Sport
- Country: South Korea
- Sport: Judo

Achievements and titles
- Olympic Games: (silver) (1996)
- World Champ.: (silver) (1995)
- Asian Champ.: (gold) (1996, 1997)
Medal record
Men's judo
Representing South Korea
Olympic Games
Silver medal – second place	1996 Atlanta	‍–‍71 kg
World Championships
Silver medal – second place	1995 Chiba	‍–‍71 kg
Asian Championships
Gold medal – first place	1996 Ho Chi Minh	‍–‍71 kg
Gold medal – first place	1997 Manila	‍–‍71 kg
Silver medal – second place	1995 New Delhi	‍–‍71 kg

Profile at external databases
- IJF: 53370
- JudoInside.com: 3708
- Updated on 4 June 2023

Kwak Dae-Sung is a South Korean retired judoka who is a two-time Asian champion (1996 and 1997).

He won a silver medal in the lightweight division at the 1996 Summer Olympics, and also won silver at the 1995 World Judo Championships.
