= Judo at the East Asian Games =

Judo competition

Judo has been an event at the East Asian Games since 1993 in Shanghai, China.

== List Tournaments ==
Year	Date	City–host country	Venue	# Countries	# Athletes	competition		Ref.
Year	Date	City–host country	Venue	# Countries	# Athletes	♂	♀	Ref.
1993	14–17 March	Shanghai, China	Jiading Gymnasium	9 (Note: Japan, South Korea, China, Mongolia, Chinese Taipei, Hong Kong, Macau, Guam and North Korea)		●	●	
1997	15–18 May	Busan, South Korea	Dong-A University	9		●	●	
2001	24–27 May	Osaka, Japan	Osaka Prefectural Gymnasium	10 (Note: including Australia)		●	●	
2009	12–13 December	Hong Kong	Shek Kip Mei Park	9		●	●	
2013	14–15 October	Tianjin, China	Civil Aviation University of China	9	89	●	●	

== Medal table ==
Rank	Nation	Gold	Silver	Bronze	Total
1	Japan (JPN)	27	16	15	58
2	South Korea (KOR)	21	17	22	60
3	China (CHN)	16	15	23	54
4	North Korea (PRK)	1	6	9	16
5	Hong Kong (HKG)	1	0	2	3
6	Mongolia (MGL)	0	4	26	30
7	Chinese Taipei (TPE)	0	4	14	18
8	Kazakhstan (KAZ)	0	3	7	10
9	Macau (MAC)	0	1	2	3
10	Australia (AUS)	0	0	4	4
Totals (10 entries)		66	66	124	256
