= List of Asian Games medalists in judo =

This is the complete list of Asian Games medalists in judo from 1986 to 2022.

== Men ==
=== Extra lightweight ===
- −60 kg: 1986–

Games	Gold	Silver	Bronze
(South Korea) 1986 Seoul	Kim Jae-yup (KOR)	Koji Ono (JPN)	Zhang Guojun (CHN)
(South Korea) 1986 Seoul	Kim Jae-yup (KOR)	Koji Ono (JPN)	Morteza Khodadadi (IRN)
(China) 1990 Beijing	Tadanori Koshino (JPN)	Kim Jong-man (KOR)	Dashgombyn Battulga (MGL)
(China) 1990 Beijing	Tadanori Koshino (JPN)	Kim Jong-man (KOR)	Pak Hak-yong (PRK)
(Japan) 1994 Hiroshima	Kim Hyuk (KOR)	Ryuji Sonoda (JPN)	Hassan Ahadpour (IRI)
(Japan) 1994 Hiroshima	Kim Hyuk (KOR)	Ryuji Sonoda (JPN)	Serik Adiganov (KAZ)
(Thailand) 1998 Bangkok	Kazuhiko Tokuno (JPN)	Yang Bo (CHN)	Nurbol Suleimenov (KAZ)
(Thailand) 1998 Bangkok	Kazuhiko Tokuno (JPN)	Yang Bo (CHN)	Hyun Seung-hoon (KOR)
(South Korea) 2002 Busan	Masoud Haji Akhondzadeh (IRI)	Bazarbek Donbay (KAZ)	Masato Uchishiba (JPN)
(South Korea) 2002 Busan	Masoud Haji Akhondzadeh (IRI)	Bazarbek Donbay (KAZ)	Choi Min-ho (KOR)
(Qatar) 2006 Doha	Tatsuaki Egusa (JPN)	Cho Nam-suk (KOR)	Masoud Haji Akhondzadeh (IRI)
(Qatar) 2006 Doha	Tatsuaki Egusa (JPN)	Cho Nam-suk (KOR)	Salamat Utarbayev (KAZ)
(China) 2010 Guangzhou	Rishod Sobirov (UZB)	Hiroaki Hiraoka (JPN)	A Lamusi (CHN)
(China) 2010 Guangzhou	Rishod Sobirov (UZB)	Hiroaki Hiraoka (JPN)	Choi Min-ho (KOR)
(South Korea) 2014 Incheon	Yeldos Smetov (KAZ)	Ganbatyn Boldbaatar (MGL)	Toru Shishime (JPN)
(South Korea) 2014 Incheon	Yeldos Smetov (KAZ)	Ganbatyn Boldbaatar (MGL)	Kim Won-jin (KOR)
(Indonesia) 2018 Jakarta–Palembang	Diyorbek Urozboev (UZB)	Toru Shishime (JPN)	Lee Ha-rim (KOR)
(Indonesia) 2018 Jakarta–Palembang	Diyorbek Urozboev (UZB)	Toru Shishime (JPN)	Yang Yung-wei (TPE)
(China) 2022 Hangzhou	Yang Yung-wei (TPE)	Lee Ha-rim (KOR)	Magzhan Shamshadin (KAZ)
(China) 2022 Hangzhou	Yang Yung-wei (TPE)	Lee Ha-rim (KOR)	Chae Kwang-jin (PRK)

=== Half lightweight ===
- −65 kg: 1986–1994
- −66 kg: 1998–

Games	Gold	Silver	Bronze
(South Korea) 1986 Seoul	Lee Kyung-keun (KOR)	Yosuke Yamamoto (JPN)	Wang Xiaojie (CHN)
(South Korea) 1986 Seoul	Lee Kyung-keun (KOR)	Yosuke Yamamoto (JPN)	Sandeep Byala (IND)
(China) 1990 Beijing	Masahiko Okuma (JPN)	Kim Jong-soo (KOR)	Gao Erwei (CHN)
(China) 1990 Beijing	Masahiko Okuma (JPN)	Kim Jong-soo (KOR)	Huang Chien-lung (TPE)
(Japan) 1994 Hiroshima	Yukimasa Nakamura (JPN)	Ivan Karazelidi (KAZ)	Hao Yi (CHN)
(Japan) 1994 Hiroshima	Yukimasa Nakamura (JPN)	Ivan Karazelidi (KAZ)	Dashgombyn Battulga (MGL)
(Thailand) 1998 Bangkok	Yukimasa Nakamura (JPN)	Ivan Baglayev (KAZ)	Arash Miresmaeili (IRI)
(Thailand) 1998 Bangkok	Yukimasa Nakamura (JPN)	Ivan Baglayev (KAZ)	Erdenebaataryn Uuganbayar (MGL)
(South Korea) 2002 Busan	Kim Hyung-ju (KOR)	Guwanç Nurmuhammedow (TKM)	Michihiro Omigawa (JPN)
(South Korea) 2002 Busan	Kim Hyung-ju (KOR)	Guwanç Nurmuhammedow (TKM)	Gantömöriin Dashdavaa (MGL)
(Qatar) 2006 Doha	Khashbaataryn Tsagaanbaatar (MGL)	Arash Miresmaeili (IRI)	Hiroyuki Akimoto (JPN)
(Qatar) 2006 Doha	Khashbaataryn Tsagaanbaatar (MGL)	Arash Miresmaeili (IRI)	Kim Kwang-sub (KOR)
(China) 2010 Guangzhou	Kim Joo-jin (KOR)	Mirzohid Farmonov (UZB)	Junpei Morishita (JPN)
(China) 2010 Guangzhou	Kim Joo-jin (KOR)	Mirzohid Farmonov (UZB)	Hong Kuk-hyon (PRK)
(South Korea) 2014 Incheon	Davaadorjiin Tömörkhüleg (MGL)	Tomofumi Takajo (JPN)	Azamat Mukanov (KAZ)
(South Korea) 2014 Incheon	Davaadorjiin Tömörkhüleg (MGL)	Tomofumi Takajo (JPN)	Mirzohid Farmonov (UZB)
(Indonesia) 2018 Jakarta–Palembang	An Ba-ul (KOR)	Joshiro Maruyama (JPN)	Yeldos Zhumakanov (KAZ)
(Indonesia) 2018 Jakarta–Palembang	An Ba-ul (KOR)	Joshiro Maruyama (JPN)	Artur Te (KGZ)
(China) 2022 Hangzhou	Ryoma Tanaka (JPN)	Yondonperenlein Baskhüü (MGL)	An Ba-ul (KOR)
(China) 2022 Hangzhou	Ryoma Tanaka (JPN)	Yondonperenlein Baskhüü (MGL)	Bayanmönkhiin Narmandakh (UAE)

=== Lightweight ===
- −71 kg: 1986–1994
- −73 kg: 1998–

Games – Men's 71 kg	Gold	Silver	Bronze
(South Korea) 1986 Seoul	Ahn Byeong-keun (KOR)	Yukiharu Yoshitaka (JPN)	Zhu Changhe (CHN)
(South Korea) 1986 Seoul	Ahn Byeong-keun (KOR)	Yukiharu Yoshitaka (JPN)	Chong Siao Chin (HKG)
(China) 1990 Beijing	Chung Hoon (KOR)	Ri Chang-su (PRK)	Toshihiko Koga (JPN)
(China) 1990 Beijing	Chung Hoon (KOR)	Ri Chang-su (PRK)	Artagiin Buyanjargal (MGL)
(Japan) 1994 Hiroshima	Chung Hoon (KOR)	Shigeru Toyama (JPN)	Ismail Vechegurov (KAZ)
(Japan) 1994 Hiroshima	Chung Hoon (KOR)	Shigeru Toyama (JPN)	Khaliuny Boldbaatar (MGL)
(Thailand) 1998 Bangkok	Khaliuny Boldbaatar (MGL)	Kenzo Nakamura (JPN)	Kim Dae-wook (KOR)
(Thailand) 1998 Bangkok	Khaliuny Boldbaatar (MGL)	Kenzo Nakamura (JPN)	Andrey Shturbabin (UZB)
(South Korea) 2002 Busan	Choi Yong-sin (KOR)	Yusuke Kanamaru (JPN)	Hamed Malekmohammadi (IRI)
(South Korea) 2002 Busan	Choi Yong-sin (KOR)	Yusuke Kanamaru (JPN)	Egamnazar Akbarov (UZB)
(Qatar) 2006 Doha	Lee Won-hee (KOR)	Masahiro Takamatsu (JPN)	Rasul Boqiev (TJK)
(Qatar) 2006 Doha	Lee Won-hee (KOR)	Masahiro Takamatsu (JPN)	Shokir Muminov (UZB)
(China) 2010 Guangzhou	Hiroyuki Akimoto (JPN)	Wang Ki-chun (KOR)	Rasul Boqiev (TJK)
(China) 2010 Guangzhou	Hiroyuki Akimoto (JPN)	Wang Ki-chun (KOR)	Navruz Jurakobilov (UZB)
(South Korea) 2014 Incheon	Hiroyuki Akimoto (JPN)	Ganbaataryn Odbayar (MGL)	Bang Gui-man (KOR)
(South Korea) 2014 Incheon	Hiroyuki Akimoto (JPN)	Ganbaataryn Odbayar (MGL)	Hong Kuk-hyon (PRK)
(Indonesia) 2018 Jakarta–Palembang	Shohei Ono (JPN)	An Chang-rim (KOR)	Mohammad Mohammadi (IRI)
(Indonesia) 2018 Jakarta–Palembang	Shohei Ono (JPN)	An Chang-rim (KOR)	Victor Scvortov (UAE)
(China) 2022 Hangzhou	Murodjon Yuldoshev (UZB)	Soichi Hashimoto (JPN)	Tsend-Ochiryn Tsogtbaatar (MGL)
(China) 2022 Hangzhou	Murodjon Yuldoshev (UZB)	Soichi Hashimoto (JPN)	Behruzi Khojazoda (TJK)

=== Half middleweight ===
- −78 kg: 1986–1994
- −81 kg: 1998–

Games – Men's 78 kg	Gold	Silver	Bronze
(South Korea) 1986 Seoul	Cho Hyung-soo (KOR)	Tang Haili (CHN)	Hisham Al-Sharaf (KUW)
(South Korea) 1986 Seoul	Cho Hyung-soo (KOR)	Tang Haili (CHN)	Marut Techawanit (THA)
(China) 1990 Beijing	Kim Byung-joo (KOR)	Li Jinshan (CHN)	Yoshiyuki Takanami (JPN)
(China) 1990 Beijing	Kim Byung-joo (KOR)	Li Jinshan (CHN)	Liaw Der-cheng (TPE)
(Japan) 1994 Hiroshima	Yoon Dong-sik (KOR)	Hidenori Horikoshi (JPN)	Lo Yu-wei (TPE)
(Japan) 1994 Hiroshima	Yoon Dong-sik (KOR)	Hidenori Horikoshi (JPN)	Vladimir Shmakov (UZB)
(Thailand) 1998 Bangkok	Cho In-chul (KOR)	Kwak Ok-chol (PRK)	Kazem Sarikhani (IRI)
(Thailand) 1998 Bangkok	Cho In-chul (KOR)	Kwak Ok-chol (PRK)	Ruslan Seilkhanov (KAZ)
(South Korea) 2002 Busan	Yoshihiro Akiyama (JPN)	Ahn Dong-jin (KOR)	Damdinsürengiin Nyamkhüü (MGL)
(South Korea) 2002 Busan	Yoshihiro Akiyama (JPN)	Ahn Dong-jin (KOR)	Farkhod Turayev (UZB)
(Qatar) 2006 Doha	Damdinsürengiin Nyamkhüü (MGL)	Almas Atayev (KAZ)	Guo Lei (CHN)
(Qatar) 2006 Doha	Damdinsürengiin Nyamkhüü (MGL)	Almas Atayev (KAZ)	Takashi Ono (JPN)
(China) 2010 Guangzhou	Kim Jae-bum (KOR)	Masahiro Takamatsu (JPN)	None awarded
(China) 2010 Guangzhou	Kim Jae-bum (KOR)	Islam Bozbayev (KAZ)	None awarded
(South Korea) 2014 Incheon	Kim Jae-bum (KOR)	Nacif Elias (LIB)	Keita Nagashima (JPN)
(South Korea) 2014 Incheon	Kim Jae-bum (KOR)	Nacif Elias (LIB)	Nyamsürengiin Dagvasüren (MGL)
(Indonesia) 2018 Jakarta–Palembang	Didar Khamza (KAZ)	Saeid Mollaei (IRI)	Vladimir Zoloev (KGZ)
(Indonesia) 2018 Jakarta–Palembang	Didar Khamza (KAZ)	Saeid Mollaei (IRI)	Otgonbaataryn Uuganbaatar (MGL)
(China) 2022 Hangzhou	Somon Makhmadbekov (TJK)	Lee Joon-hwan (KOR)	Yuhei Oino (JPN)
(China) 2022 Hangzhou	Somon Makhmadbekov (TJK)	Lee Joon-hwan (KOR)	Abylaikhan Zhubanazar (KAZ)

=== Middleweight ===
- −86 kg: 1986–1994
- −90 kg: 1998–

Games – Men's 86 kg	Gold	Silver	Bronze
(South Korea) 1986 Seoul	Park Kyung-ho (KOR)	Noriyuki Sannohe (JPN)	Su Jungen (CHN)
(South Korea) 1986 Seoul	Park Kyung-ho (KOR)	Noriyuki Sannohe (JPN)	Hassabodin Rojanachiva (THA)
(China) 1990 Beijing	Hirotaka Okada (JPN)	Kim Seung-gyu (KOR)	Zhao Zhishan (CHN)
(China) 1990 Beijing	Hirotaka Okada (JPN)	Kim Seung-gyu (KOR)	Pak Jong-chol (PRK)
(Japan) 1994 Hiroshima	Yoshio Nakamura (JPN)	Sergey Alimzhanov (KAZ)	Kim Suk-kyu (KOR)
(Japan) 1994 Hiroshima	Yoshio Nakamura (JPN)	Sergey Alimzhanov (KAZ)	Khayrullo Nazriev (TJK)
(Thailand) 1998 Bangkok	Yoo Sung-yeon (KOR)	Yoshio Nakamura (JPN)	Dashzevegiin Pürevsüren (MGL)
(Thailand) 1998 Bangkok	Yoo Sung-yeon (KOR)	Yoshio Nakamura (JPN)	Kamol Muradov (UZB)
(South Korea) 2002 Busan	Yuta Yazaki (JPN)	Tsend-Ayuushiin Ochirbat (MGL)	Park Sung-keun (KOR)
(South Korea) 2002 Busan	Yuta Yazaki (JPN)	Tsend-Ayuushiin Ochirbat (MGL)	Vyacheslav Pereteyko (UZB)
(Qatar) 2006 Doha	Hwang Hee-tae (KOR)	Maxim Rakov (KAZ)	Hiroshi Izumi (JPN)
(Qatar) 2006 Doha	Hwang Hee-tae (KOR)	Maxim Rakov (KAZ)	Ramziddin Sayidov (UZB)
(China) 2010 Guangzhou	Takashi Ono (JPN)	Dilshod Choriev (UZB)	Lee Kyu-won (KOR)
(China) 2010 Guangzhou	Takashi Ono (JPN)	Dilshod Choriev (UZB)	Tseng Han-chieh (TPE)
(South Korea) 2014 Incheon	Yuya Yoshida (JPN)	Dilshod Choriev (UZB)	Gwak Dong-han (KOR)
(South Korea) 2014 Incheon	Yuya Yoshida (JPN)	Dilshod Choriev (UZB)	Lkhagvasürengiin Otgonbaatar (MGL)
(Indonesia) 2018 Jakarta–Palembang	Gwak Dong-han (KOR)	Gantulgyn Altanbagana (MGL)	Mashu Baker (JPN)
(Indonesia) 2018 Jakarta–Palembang	Gwak Dong-han (KOR)	Gantulgyn Altanbagana (MGL)	Komronshokh Ustopiriyon (TJK)
(China) 2022 Hangzhou	Erlan Sherov (KGZ)	Davlat Bobonov (UZB)	Caramnob Sagaipov (LBN)
(China) 2022 Hangzhou	Erlan Sherov (KGZ)	Davlat Bobonov (UZB)	Aram Grigorian (UAE)

=== Half heavyweight ===
- −95 kg: 1986–1994
- −100 kg: 1998–

Games – Men's 95 kg	Gold	Silver	Bronze
(South Korea) 1986 Seoul	Ha Hyung-joo (KOR)	Hitoshi Sugai (JPN)	Cawas Billimoria (IND)
(South Korea) 1986 Seoul	Ha Hyung-joo (KOR)	Hitoshi Sugai (JPN)	Tareq Al-Ghareeb (KUW)
(China) 1990 Beijing	Yasuhiro Kai (JPN)	Jiang Fabin (CHN)	Baek Jang-ki (KOR)
(China) 1990 Beijing	Yasuhiro Kai (JPN)	Jiang Fabin (CHN)	Pak Ung-goi (PRK)
(Japan) 1994 Hiroshima	Shigeru Okaizumi (JPN)	Kim Jae-sik (KOR)	Sergey Shakimov (KAZ)
(Japan) 1994 Hiroshima	Shigeru Okaizumi (JPN)	Kim Jae-sik (KOR)	Dmitry Soloviev (UZB)
(Thailand) 1998 Bangkok	Kosei Inoue (JPN)	Armen Bagdasarov (UZB)	Farhad Maabi (IRI)
(Thailand) 1998 Bangkok	Kosei Inoue (JPN)	Armen Bagdasarov (UZB)	Park Sung-keun (KOR)
(South Korea) 2002 Busan	Keiji Suzuki (JPN)	Jang Sung-ho (KOR)	Abbas Fallah (IRI)
(South Korea) 2002 Busan	Keiji Suzuki (JPN)	Jang Sung-ho (KOR)	Askhat Zhitkeyev (KAZ)
(Qatar) 2006 Doha	Jang Sung-ho (KOR)	Satoshi Ishii (JPN)	Askhat Zhitkeyev (KAZ)
(Qatar) 2006 Doha	Jang Sung-ho (KOR)	Satoshi Ishii (JPN)	Utkir Kurbanov (UZB)
(China) 2010 Guangzhou	Hwang Hee-tae (KOR)	Takamasa Anai (JPN)	Maxim Rakov (KAZ)
(China) 2010 Guangzhou	Hwang Hee-tae (KOR)	Takamasa Anai (JPN)	Ramziddin Sayidov (UZB)
(South Korea) 2014 Incheon	Naidangiin Tüvshinbayar (MGL)	Maxim Rakov (KAZ)	Cho Gu-ham (KOR)
(South Korea) 2014 Incheon	Naidangiin Tüvshinbayar (MGL)	Maxim Rakov (KAZ)	Ramziddin Sayidov (UZB)
(Indonesia) 2018 Jakarta–Palembang	Kentaro Iida (JPN)	Cho Gu-ham (KOR)	Lkhagvasürengiin Otgonbaatar (MGL)
(Indonesia) 2018 Jakarta–Palembang	Kentaro Iida (JPN)	Cho Gu-ham (KOR)	Sherali Juraev (UZB)
(China) 2022 Hangzhou	Muzaffarbek Turoboyev (UZB)	Batkhuyagiin Gonchigsüren (MGL)	Nurlykhan Sharkhan (KAZ)
(China) 2022 Hangzhou	Muzaffarbek Turoboyev (UZB)	Batkhuyagiin Gonchigsüren (MGL)	Dzhafar Kostoev (UAE)

=== Heavyweight ===
- +95 kg: 1986–1994
- +100 kg: 1998–

Games – Men's +95 kg	Gold	Silver	Bronze
(South Korea) 1986 Seoul	Hitoshi Saito (JPN)	Xu Guoqing (CHN)	Shyam Singh Gurjar (IND)
(South Korea) 1986 Seoul	Hitoshi Saito (JPN)	Xu Guoqing (CHN)	Kim Ik-soo (KOR)
(China) 1990 Beijing	Hwang Jae-gil (PRK)	Badmaanyambuugiin Bat-Erdene (MGL)	Naoya Ogawa (JPN)
(China) 1990 Beijing	Hwang Jae-gil (PRK)	Badmaanyambuugiin Bat-Erdene (MGL)	Kim Kun-soo (KOR)
(Japan) 1994 Hiroshima	Jun Konno (JPN)	Mahmoud Miran (IRI)	Wang Ruisheng (CHN)
(Japan) 1994 Hiroshima	Jun Konno (JPN)	Mahmoud Miran (IRI)	Badmaanyambuugiin Bat-Erdene (MGL)
(Thailand) 1998 Bangkok	Shinichi Shinohara (JPN)	Mahmoud Miran (IRI)	Pan Song (CHN)
(Thailand) 1998 Bangkok	Shinichi Shinohara (JPN)	Mahmoud Miran (IRI)	Ochiryn Odgerel (MGL)
(South Korea) 2002 Busan	Yasuyuki Muneta (JPN)	Mahmoud Miran (IRI)	Vyacheslav Berduta (KAZ)
(South Korea) 2002 Busan	Yasuyuki Muneta (JPN)	Mahmoud Miran (IRI)	Kang Byung-jin (KOR)
(Qatar) 2006 Doha	Yasuyuki Muneta (JPN)	Mohammad Reza Roudaki (IRI)	Yeldos Ikhsangaliyev (KAZ)
(Qatar) 2006 Doha	Yasuyuki Muneta (JPN)	Mohammad Reza Roudaki (IRI)	Abdullo Tangriev (UZB)
(China) 2010 Guangzhou	Kim Soo-whan (KOR)	Abdullo Tangriev (UZB)	Mohammad Reza Roudaki (IRI)
(China) 2010 Guangzhou	Kim Soo-whan (KOR)	Abdullo Tangriev (UZB)	Daiki Kamikawa (JPN)
(South Korea) 2014 Incheon	Takeshi Ojitani (JPN)	Ölziibayaryn Düürenbayar (MGL)	Kim Sung-min (KOR)
(South Korea) 2014 Incheon	Takeshi Ojitani (JPN)	Ölziibayaryn Düürenbayar (MGL)	Abdullo Tangriev (UZB)
(Indonesia) 2018 Jakarta–Palembang	Kim Sung-min (KOR)	Ölziibayaryn Düürenbayar (MGL)	Shakarmamad Mirmamadov (TJK)
(Indonesia) 2018 Jakarta–Palembang	Kim Sung-min (KOR)	Ölziibayaryn Düürenbayar (MGL)	Bekmurod Oltiboev (UZB)
(China) 2022 Hangzhou	Magomedomar Magomedomarov (UAE)	Temur Rakhimov (TJK)	Kim Min-jong (KOR)
(China) 2022 Hangzhou	Magomedomar Magomedomarov (UAE)	Temur Rakhimov (TJK)	Alisher Yusupov (UZB)

=== Openweight ===
Games – Games – Men's open	Gold	Silver	Bronze
(South Korea) 1986 Seoul	Yoshimi Masaki (JPN)	Cho Yong-chul (KOR)	Ding Mingjing (CHN)
(South Korea) 1986 Seoul	Yoshimi Masaki (JPN)	Cho Yong-chul (KOR)	Bannu Singh (IND)
(China) 1990 Beijing	Hideyuki Sekine (JPN)	Kim Kun-soo (KOR)	Badmaanyambuugiin Bat-Erdene (MGL)
(China) 1990 Beijing	Hideyuki Sekine (JPN)	Kim Kun-soo (KOR)	Yen Kuo-che (TPE)
(Japan) 1994 Hiroshima	Katsuyuki Masuchi (JPN)	Lee Joon-young (KOR)	Wang Ruisheng (CHN)
(Japan) 1994 Hiroshima	Katsuyuki Masuchi (JPN)	Lee Joon-young (KOR)	Badmaanyambuugiin Bat-Erdene (MGL)
(South Korea) 2002 Busan	Kosei Inoue (JPN)	Abdullo Tangriev (UZB)	Liu Shenggang (CHN)
(South Korea) 2002 Busan	Kosei Inoue (JPN)	Abdullo Tangriev (UZB)	Mahmoud Miran (IRI)
(Qatar) 2006 Doha	Kim Sung-bum (KOR)	Mahmoud Miran (IRI)	Yohei Takai (JPN)
(Qatar) 2006 Doha	Kim Sung-bum (KOR)	Mahmoud Miran (IRI)	Askhat Zhitkeyev (KAZ)
(China) 2010 Guangzhou	Kazuhiko Takahashi (JPN)	Mohammad Reza Roudaki (IRI)	Khadbaataryn Mönkhbaatar (MGL)
(China) 2010 Guangzhou	Kazuhiko Takahashi (JPN)	Mohammad Reza Roudaki (IRI)	Utkir Kurbanov (UZB)

=== Team ===
Games	Gold	Silver	Bronze
(South Korea) 2014 Incheon	South Korea (KOR); Choi Gwang-hyeon; Youn Tae-ho; Bang Gui-man; Kim Jae-bum; Gwak Dong-han; Lee Kyu-won; Kim Sung-min	Kazakhstan (KAZ); Azamat Mukanov; Yeldos Smetov; Dastan Ykybayev; Aziz Kalkamanuly; Timur Bolat; Maxim Rakov; Yerzhan Shynkeyev	Japan (JPN); Tomofumi Takajo; Toru Shishime; Hiroyuki Akimoto; Keita Nagashima; Yuya Yoshida; Yusuke Kumashiro; Takeshi Ojitani
(South Korea) 2014 Incheon	South Korea (KOR); Choi Gwang-hyeon; Youn Tae-ho; Bang Gui-man; Kim Jae-bum; Gwak Dong-han; Lee Kyu-won; Kim Sung-min	Kazakhstan (KAZ); Azamat Mukanov; Yeldos Smetov; Dastan Ykybayev; Aziz Kalkamanuly; Timur Bolat; Maxim Rakov; Yerzhan Shynkeyev	Uzbekistan (UZB); Mirzohid Farmonov; Rishod Sobirov; Navruz Jurakobilov; Sarvar Shomurodov; Yakhyo Imamov; Dilshod Choriev; Soyib Kurbonov; Abdullo Tangriev

== Women ==
=== Extra lightweight ===
- −48 kg: 1990–

Games – Women's 48 kg	Gold	Silver	Bronze
(China) 1990 Beijing	Fumiko Ezaki (JPN)	Li Aiyue (CHN)	Ok Kyung-sook (KOR)
(China) 1990 Beijing	Fumiko Ezaki (JPN)	Li Aiyue (CHN)	Huang Yu-hsin (TPE)
(Japan) 1994 Hiroshima	Ryoko Tamura (JPN)	Li Aiyue (CHN)	Kim So-la (KOR)
(Japan) 1994 Hiroshima	Ryoko Tamura (JPN)	Li Aiyue (CHN)	Huang Yu-hsin (TPE)
(Thailand) 1998 Bangkok	Tomoe Makabe (JPN)	Cha Hyon-hyang (PRK)	Gao Lijuan (CHN)
(Thailand) 1998 Bangkok	Tomoe Makabe (JPN)	Cha Hyon-hyang (PRK)	Nuanchan Tangprapassorn (THA)
(South Korea) 2002 Busan	Kayo Kitada (JPN)	Kim Young-ran (KOR)	Shao Dan (CHN)
(South Korea) 2002 Busan	Kayo Kitada (JPN)	Kim Young-ran (KOR)	Ri Kyong-ok (PRK)
(Qatar) 2006 Doha	Gao Feng (CHN)	Kim Young-ran (KOR)	Misato Nakamura (JPN)
(Qatar) 2006 Doha	Gao Feng (CHN)	Kim Young-ran (KOR)	Kelbet Nurgazina (KAZ)
(China) 2010 Guangzhou	Wu Shugen (CHN)	Tomoko Fukumi (JPN)	Chung Jung-yeon (KOR)
(China) 2010 Guangzhou	Wu Shugen (CHN)	Tomoko Fukumi (JPN)	Baljinnyamyn Bat-Erdene (MGL)
(South Korea) 2014 Incheon	Mönkhbatyn Urantsetseg (MGL)	Emi Yamagishi (JPN)	Jeong Bo-kyeong (KOR)
(South Korea) 2014 Incheon	Mönkhbatyn Urantsetseg (MGL)	Emi Yamagishi (JPN)	Kim Sol-mi (PRK)
(Indonesia) 2018 Jakarta–Palembang	Jeong Bo-kyeong (KOR)	Ami Kondo (JPN)	Galbadrakhyn Otgontsetseg (KAZ)
(Indonesia) 2018 Jakarta–Palembang	Jeong Bo-kyeong (KOR)	Ami Kondo (JPN)	Mönkhbatyn Urantsetseg (MGL)
(Indonesia) 2022 Hangzhou	Natsumi Tsunoda (JPN)	Abiba Abuzhakynova (KAZ)	Guo Zongying (CHN)
(Indonesia) 2022 Hangzhou	Natsumi Tsunoda (JPN)	Abiba Abuzhakynova (KAZ)	Khalimajon Kurbonova (UZB)

=== Half lightweight ===
- −52 kg: 1990–

Games – Women's 52 kg	Gold	Silver	Bronze
(China) 1990 Beijing	Mutsumi Ueda (JPN)	Chang Fengxia (CHN)	Yu Wai Seung (HKG)
(China) 1990 Beijing	Mutsumi Ueda (JPN)	Chang Fengxia (CHN)	Park Mi-hee (KOR)
(Japan) 1994 Hiroshima	Hyun Sook-hee (KOR)	Atsuko Takeda (JPN)	Wang Jin (CHN)
(Japan) 1994 Hiroshima	Hyun Sook-hee (KOR)	Atsuko Takeda (JPN)	Tseng Hsiao-fen (TPE)
(Thailand) 1998 Bangkok	Kye Sun-hui (PRK)	Kim Hye-sook (KOR)	Li Ying (CHN)
(Thailand) 1998 Bangkok	Kye Sun-hui (PRK)	Kim Hye-sook (KOR)	Kazue Nagai (JPN)
(South Korea) 2002 Busan	Lee Eun-hee (KOR)	Xian Dongmei (CHN)	Sholpan Kaliyeva (KAZ)
(South Korea) 2002 Busan	Lee Eun-hee (KOR)	Xian Dongmei (CHN)	Kye Sun-hui (PRK)
(Qatar) 2006 Doha	An Kum-ae (PRK)	Mönkhbaataryn Bundmaa (MGL)	Li Ying (CHN)
(Qatar) 2006 Doha	An Kum-ae (PRK)	Mönkhbaataryn Bundmaa (MGL)	Yuki Yokosawa (JPN)
(China) 2010 Guangzhou	Misato Nakamura (JPN)	Mönkhbaataryn Bundmaa (MGL)	He Hongmei (CHN)
(China) 2010 Guangzhou	Misato Nakamura (JPN)	Mönkhbaataryn Bundmaa (MGL)	An Kum-ae (PRK)
(South Korea) 2014 Incheon	Misato Nakamura (JPN)	Gülbadam Babamuratowa (TKM)	Lenariya Mingazova (KAZ)
(South Korea) 2014 Incheon	Misato Nakamura (JPN)	Gülbadam Babamuratowa (TKM)	Jung Eun-jung (KOR)
(Indonesia) 2018 Jakarta–Palembang	Natsumi Tsunoda (JPN)	Park Da-sol (KOR)	Rim Song-sim (PRK)
(Indonesia) 2018 Jakarta–Palembang	Natsumi Tsunoda (JPN)	Park Da-sol (KOR)	Kachakorn Warasiha (THA)
(China) 2022 Hangzhou	Diyora Keldiyorova (UZB)	Bishreltiin Khorloodoi (UAE)	Lkhagvasürengiin Sosorbaram (MGL)
(China) 2022 Hangzhou	Diyora Keldiyorova (UZB)	Bishreltiin Khorloodoi (UAE)	Jung Ye-rin (KOR)

=== Lightweight ===
- −56 kg: 1990–1994
- −57 kg: 1998–

Games – Women's 56 kg	Gold	Silver	Bronze
(China) 1990 Beijing	Li Zhongyun (CHN)	Tsay Shwu-huey (TPE)	Cho Min-sun (KOR)
(China) 1990 Beijing	Li Zhongyun (CHN)	Tsay Shwu-huey (TPE)	Prateep Pinitwung (THA)
(Japan) 1994 Hiroshima	Jung Sun-yong (KOR)	Noriko Sugawara (JPN)	Liu Chuang (CHN)
(Japan) 1994 Hiroshima	Jung Sun-yong (KOR)	Noriko Sugawara (JPN)	Poonam Chopra (IND)
(Thailand) 1998 Bangkok	Khishigbatyn Erdenet-Od (MGL)	Shen Jun (CHN)	Kie Kusakabe (JPN)
(Thailand) 1998 Bangkok	Khishigbatyn Erdenet-Od (MGL)	Shen Jun (CHN)	Jung Sung-sook (KOR)
(South Korea) 2002 Busan	Hong Ok-song (PRK)	Kie Kusakabe (JPN)	Kim Hwa-soo (KOR)
(South Korea) 2002 Busan	Hong Ok-song (PRK)	Kie Kusakabe (JPN)	Khishigbatyn Erdenet-Od (MGL)
(Qatar) 2006 Doha	Xu Yan (CHN)	Aiko Sato (JPN)	Kang Sin-young (KOR)
(Qatar) 2006 Doha	Xu Yan (CHN)	Aiko Sato (JPN)	Hong Ok-song (PRK)
(China) 2010 Guangzhou	Kaori Matsumoto (JPN)	Kim Jan-di (KOR)	Tümen-Odyn Battögs (MGL)
(China) 2010 Guangzhou	Kaori Matsumoto (JPN)	Kim Jan-di (KOR)	Lien Chen-ling (TPE)
(South Korea) 2014 Incheon	Anzu Yamamoto (JPN)	Kim Jan-di (KOR)	Dorjsürengiin Sumiyaa (MGL)
(South Korea) 2014 Incheon	Anzu Yamamoto (JPN)	Kim Jan-di (KOR)	Ri Hyo-sun (PRK)
(Indonesia) 2018 Jakarta–Palembang	Momo Tamaoki (JPN)	Kim Jin-a (PRK)	Dorjsürengiin Sumiyaa (MGL)
(Indonesia) 2018 Jakarta–Palembang	Momo Tamaoki (JPN)	Kim Jin-a (PRK)	Lien Chen-ling (TPE)
(China) 2022 Hangzhou	Lien Chen-ling (TPE)	Momo Tamaoki (JPN)	Park Eun-song (KOR)
(China) 2022 Hangzhou	Lien Chen-ling (TPE)	Momo Tamaoki (JPN)	Maýsa Pardaýewa (TKM)

=== Half middleweight ===
- −61 kg: 1990–1994
- −63 kg: 1998–

Games – Women's 61 kg	Gold	Silver	Bronze
(China) 1990 Beijing	Jin Xianglan (CHN)	Takako Kobayashi (JPN)	Kim Sung-hye (KOR)
(China) 1990 Beijing	Jin Xianglan (CHN)	Takako Kobayashi (JPN)	Liaw Tien-ying (TPE)
(Japan) 1994 Hiroshima	Jung Sung-sook (KOR)	Yuko Emoto (JPN)	Zhang Di (CHN)
(Japan) 1994 Hiroshima	Jung Sung-sook (KOR)	Yuko Emoto (JPN)	Wu Ching Hui (HKG)
(Thailand) 1998 Bangkok	Wang Xianbo (CHN)	Nami Kimoto (JPN)	Kim Hwa-soo (KOR)
(Thailand) 1998 Bangkok	Wang Xianbo (CHN)	Nami Kimoto (JPN)	Wu Mei-ling (TPE)
(South Korea) 2002 Busan	Ayumi Tanimoto (JPN)	Ji Kyong-sun (PRK)	Li Shufang (CHN)
(South Korea) 2002 Busan	Ayumi Tanimoto (JPN)	Ji Kyong-sun (PRK)	Wang Chin-fang (TPE)
(Qatar) 2006 Doha	Xu Yuhua (CHN)	Kong Ja-young (KOR)	Ayumi Tanimoto (JPN)
(Qatar) 2006 Doha	Xu Yuhua (CHN)	Kong Ja-young (KOR)	Won Ok-im (PRK)
(China) 2010 Guangzhou	Yoshie Ueno (JPN)	Wang Chin-fang (TPE)	Kong Ja-young (KOR)
(China) 2010 Guangzhou	Yoshie Ueno (JPN)	Wang Chin-fang (TPE)	Kim Su-gyong (PRK)
(South Korea) 2014 Incheon	Joung Da-woon (KOR)	Yang Junxia (CHN)	Kana Abe (JPN)
(South Korea) 2014 Incheon	Joung Da-woon (KOR)	Yang Junxia (CHN)	Marian Urdabayeva (KAZ)
(Indonesia) 2018 Jakarta–Palembang	Nami Nabekura (JPN)	Kiyomi Watanabe (PHI)	Tang Jing (CHN)
(Indonesia) 2018 Jakarta–Palembang	Nami Nabekura (JPN)	Kiyomi Watanabe (PHI)	Han Hee-ju (KOR)
(China) 2022 Hangzhou	Miku Takaichi (JPN)	Tang Jing (CHN)	Esmigul Kuyulova (KAZ)
(China) 2022 Hangzhou	Miku Takaichi (JPN)	Tang Jing (CHN)	Kim Ji-jeong (KOR)

=== Middleweight ===
- −66 kg: 1990–1994
- −70 kg: 1998–

Games – Women's 66 kg	Gold	Silver	Bronze
(China) 1990 Beijing	Zhang Di (CHN)	Ryoko Fujimoto (JPN)	Park Ji-yeong (KOR)
(China) 1990 Beijing	Zhang Di (CHN)	Ryoko Fujimoto (JPN)	Thandar Sit Naing (MYA)
(Japan) 1994 Hiroshima	Aiko Oishi (JPN)	Cho Min-sun (KOR)	Nadežda Želtakowa (TKM)
(Japan) 1994 Hiroshima	Aiko Oishi (JPN)	Cho Min-sun (KOR)	Wu Mei-ling (TPE)
(Thailand) 1998 Bangkok	Lim Jung-sook (KOR)	Miki Amao (JPN)	Song Jianfeng (CHN)
(Thailand) 1998 Bangkok	Lim Jung-sook (KOR)	Miki Amao (JPN)	Chen Chiu-ping (TPE)
(South Korea) 2002 Busan	Qin Dongya (CHN)	Bae Eun-hye (KOR)	Masae Ueno (JPN)
(South Korea) 2002 Busan	Qin Dongya (CHN)	Bae Eun-hye (KOR)	Liu Shu-yun (TPE)
(Qatar) 2006 Doha	Masae Ueno (JPN)	Bae Eun-hye (KOR)	Qin Dongya (CHN)
(Qatar) 2006 Doha	Masae Ueno (JPN)	Bae Eun-hye (KOR)	Liu Shu-yun (TPE)
(China) 2010 Guangzhou	Hwang Ye-sul (KOR)	Sol Kyong (PRK)	Chen Fei (CHN)
(China) 2010 Guangzhou	Hwang Ye-sul (KOR)	Sol Kyong (PRK)	Tsend-Ayuushiin Naranjargal (MGL)
(South Korea) 2014 Incheon	Kim Seong-yeon (KOR)	Chizuru Arai (JPN)	Chen Fei (CHN)
(South Korea) 2014 Incheon	Kim Seong-yeon (KOR)	Chizuru Arai (JPN)	Tsend-Ayuushiin Naranjargal (MGL)
(Indonesia) 2018 Jakarta–Palembang	Saki Niizoe (JPN)	Kim Seong-yeon (KOR)	Tsend-Ayuushiin Naranjargal (MGL)
(Indonesia) 2018 Jakarta–Palembang	Saki Niizoe (JPN)	Kim Seong-yeon (KOR)	Gulnoza Matniyazova (UZB)
(China) 2022 Hangzhou	Shiho Tanaka (JPN)	Mun Song-hui (PRK)	Feng Yingying (CHN)
(China) 2022 Hangzhou	Shiho Tanaka (JPN)	Mun Song-hui (PRK)	Gulnoza Matniyazova (UZB)

=== Half heavyweight ===
- −72 kg: 1990–1994
- −78 kg: 1998–

Games – Women's 72 kg	Gold	Silver	Bronze
(China) 1990 Beijing	Yoko Tanabe (JPN)	Wu Weifeng (CHN)	Pujawati Utama (INA)
(China) 1990 Beijing	Yoko Tanabe (JPN)	Wu Weifeng (CHN)	Kim Mi-jung (KOR)
(Japan) 1994 Hiroshima	Kim Mi-jung (KOR)	Leng Chunhui (CHN)	Yuriko Fukuba (JPN)
(Japan) 1994 Hiroshima	Kim Mi-jung (KOR)	Leng Chunhui (CHN)	Chen Chiu-ping (TPE)
(Thailand) 1998 Bangkok	Tang Lin (CHN)	Varvara Massyagina (KAZ)	Kang Min-jeong (KOR)
(Thailand) 1998 Bangkok	Tang Lin (CHN)	Varvara Massyagina (KAZ)	Sambuugiin Dashdulam (MGL)
(South Korea) 2002 Busan	Jo Su-hee (KOR)	Mizuho Matsuzaki (JPN)	Pan Yuqing (CHN)
(South Korea) 2002 Busan	Jo Su-hee (KOR)	Mizuho Matsuzaki (JPN)	Nasiba Salaýewa (TKM)
(Qatar) 2006 Doha	Sae Nakazawa (JPN)	Lee So-yeon (KOR)	Yang Xiuli (CHN)
(Qatar) 2006 Doha	Sae Nakazawa (JPN)	Lee So-yeon (KOR)	Pürevjargalyn Lkhamdegd (MGL)
(China) 2010 Guangzhou	Jeong Gyeong-mi (KOR)	Akari Ogata (JPN)	Yang Xiuli (CHN)
(China) 2010 Guangzhou	Jeong Gyeong-mi (KOR)	Akari Ogata (JPN)	Galiya Ulmentayeva (KAZ)
(South Korea) 2014 Incheon	Jeong Gyeong-mi (KOR)	Sol Kyong (PRK)	Zhang Zhehui (CHN)
(South Korea) 2014 Incheon	Jeong Gyeong-mi (KOR)	Sol Kyong (PRK)	Mami Umeki (JPN)
(Indonesia) 2018 Jakarta–Palembang	Ruika Sato (JPN)	Park Yu-jin (KOR)	Ma Zhenzhao (CHN)
(Indonesia) 2018 Jakarta–Palembang	Ruika Sato (JPN)	Park Yu-jin (KOR)	Ikumi Oeda (THA)
(China) 2022 Hangzhou	Ma Zhenzhao (CHN)	Rika Takayama (JPN)	Yoon Hyun-ji (KOR)
(China) 2022 Hangzhou	Ma Zhenzhao (CHN)	Rika Takayama (JPN)	Iriskhon Kurbanbaeva (UZB)

=== Heavyweight ===
- +72 kg: 1990–1994
- +78 kg: 1998–

Games	Gold	Silver	Bronze
(China) 1990 Beijing	Zhang Ying (CHN)	Kaori Suzuki (JPN)	Moon Ji-yoon (KOR)
(China) 1990 Beijing	Zhang Ying (CHN)	Kaori Suzuki (JPN)	Chen Mei-huey (TPE)
(Japan) 1994 Hiroshima	Zhang Ying (CHN)	Yeh Wen-hua (TPE)	Kaori Suzuki (JPN)
(Japan) 1994 Hiroshima	Zhang Ying (CHN)	Yeh Wen-hua (TPE)	Shon Hyun-me (KOR)
(Thailand) 1998 Bangkok	Yuan Hua (CHN)	Lee Hsiao-hung (TPE)	Miho Ninomiya (JPN)
(Thailand) 1998 Bangkok	Yuan Hua (CHN)	Lee Hsiao-hung (TPE)	Paradawdee Pestonyee (THA)
(South Korea) 2002 Busan	Sun Fuming (CHN)	Choi Sook-ie (KOR)	Erdene-Ochiryn Dolgormaa (MGL)
(South Korea) 2002 Busan	Sun Fuming (CHN)	Choi Sook-ie (KOR)	Paradawdee Pestonyee (THA)
(Qatar) 2006 Doha	Tong Wen (CHN)	Dorjgotovyn Tserenkhand (MGL)	Midori Shintani (JPN)
(Qatar) 2006 Doha	Tong Wen (CHN)	Dorjgotovyn Tserenkhand (MGL)	Kim Na-young (KOR)
(China) 2010 Guangzhou	Mika Sugimoto (JPN)	Qin Qian (CHN)	Gulzhan Issanova (KAZ)
(China) 2010 Guangzhou	Mika Sugimoto (JPN)	Qin Qian (CHN)	Kim Na-young (KOR)
(South Korea) 2014 Incheon	Ma Sisi (CHN)	Nami Inamori (JPN)	Kim Eun-kyeong (KOR)
(South Korea) 2014 Incheon	Ma Sisi (CHN)	Nami Inamori (JPN)	Thonthan Satjadet (THA)
(Indonesia) 2018 Jakarta–Palembang	Akira Sone (JPN)	Kim Min-jeong (KOR)	Wang Yan (CHN)
(Indonesia) 2018 Jakarta–Palembang	Akira Sone (JPN)	Kim Min-jeong (KOR)	Gulzhan Issanova (KAZ)
(China) 2022 Hangzhou	Kim Ha-yun (KOR)	Xu Shiyan (CHN)	Wakaba Tomita (JPN)
(China) 2022 Hangzhou	Kim Ha-yun (KOR)	Xu Shiyan (CHN)	Amarsaikhany Adiyaasüren (MGL)

=== Openweight ===
Games – Women's open	Gold	Silver	Bronze
(China) 1990 Beijing	Zhuang Xiaoyan (CHN)	Moon Ji-yoon (KOR)	Yoko Tanabe (JPN)
(China) 1990 Beijing	Zhuang Xiaoyan (CHN)	Moon Ji-yoon (KOR)	Chen Ling-jen (TPE)
(Japan) 1994 Hiroshima	Noriko Anno (JPN)	Qiao Yanmin (CHN)	Moon Ji-yoon (KOR)
(Japan) 1994 Hiroshima	Noriko Anno (JPN)	Qiao Yanmin (CHN)	Sambuugiin Dashdulam (MGL)
(South Korea) 2002 Busan	Tong Wen (CHN)	Maki Tsukada (JPN)	Jo Su-hee (KOR)
(South Korea) 2002 Busan	Tong Wen (CHN)	Maki Tsukada (JPN)	Erdene-Ochiryn Dolgormaa (MGL)
(Qatar) 2006 Doha	Liu Huanyuan (CHN)	Dorjgotovyn Tserenkhand (MGL)	Mai Tateyama (JPN)
(Qatar) 2006 Doha	Liu Huanyuan (CHN)	Dorjgotovyn Tserenkhand (MGL)	Gulzhan Issanova (KAZ)
(China) 2010 Guangzhou	Liu Huanyuan (CHN)	Kim Na-young (KOR)	Megumi Tachimoto (JPN)
(China) 2010 Guangzhou	Liu Huanyuan (CHN)	Kim Na-young (KOR)	Dorjgotovyn Tserenkhand (MGL)

=== Team ===
Games	Gold	Silver	Bronze
(South Korea) 2014 Incheon	Japan (JPN); Misato Nakamura; Emi Yamagishi; Anzu Yamamoto; Kana Abe; Chizuru Arai; Nami Inamori; Mami Umeki	South Korea (KOR); Jeong Bo-kyeong; Jung Eun-jung; Kim Jan-di; Bak Ji-yun; Joung Da-woon; Kim Seong-yeon; Kim Eun-kyeong; Lee Jung-eun	China (CHN); Ma Yingnan; Wu Shugen; Zhou Ying; Yang Junxia; Chen Fei; Ma Sisi; Zhang Zhehui
(South Korea) 2014 Incheon	Japan (JPN); Misato Nakamura; Emi Yamagishi; Anzu Yamamoto; Kana Abe; Chizuru Arai; Nami Inamori; Mami Umeki	South Korea (KOR); Jeong Bo-kyeong; Jung Eun-jung; Kim Jan-di; Bak Ji-yun; Joung Da-woon; Kim Seong-yeon; Kim Eun-kyeong; Lee Jung-eun	North Korea (PRK); Kim Sol-mi; Ri Chang-ok; Ri Hyo-sun; Kim Su-gyong; Kim Jong-sun; Sol Kyong

== Mixed ==
=== Team ===
Games	Gold	Silver	Bronze
(Indonesia) 2018 Jakarta–Palembang	Japan (JPN); Masashi Ebinuma; Shohei Ono; Mashu Baker; Yusuke Kobayashi; Kokoro Kageura; Takeshi Ojitani; Haruka Funakubo; Momo Tamaoki; Saki Niizoe; Shiho Tanaka; Akira Sone; Sara Yamamoto	Kazakhstan (KAZ); Zhansay Smagulov; Yeldos Zhumakanov; Islam Bozbayev; Didar Khamza; Yerassyl Kazhybayev; Sanzhar Zhabborov; Kamshat Karassaikyzy; Sevara Nishanbayeva; Zere Bektaskyzy; Iolanta Berdybekova; Gulzhan Issanova; Zarina Raifova	China (CHN); Bayan Delihei; Qing Daga; Bu Hebilige; Xie Yadong; Qiu Shangao; Shen Zhuhong; Feng Xuemei; Zhang Wen; Liu Hongyan; Zhu Ya; Jiang Yanan; Wang Yan
(Indonesia) 2018 Jakarta–Palembang	Japan (JPN); Masashi Ebinuma; Shohei Ono; Mashu Baker; Yusuke Kobayashi; Kokoro Kageura; Takeshi Ojitani; Haruka Funakubo; Momo Tamaoki; Saki Niizoe; Shiho Tanaka; Akira Sone; Sara Yamamoto	Kazakhstan (KAZ); Zhansay Smagulov; Yeldos Zhumakanov; Islam Bozbayev; Didar Khamza; Yerassyl Kazhybayev; Sanzhar Zhabborov; Kamshat Karassaikyzy; Sevara Nishanbayeva; Zere Bektaskyzy; Iolanta Berdybekova; Gulzhan Issanova; Zarina Raifova	South Korea (KOR); Ahn Joon-sung; An Chang-rim; Gwak Dong-han; Lee Jae-yong; Cho Gu-ham; Kim Sung-min; Kim Jan-di; Kwon You-jeong; Jeong Hye-jin; Kim Seong-yeon; Han Mi-jin; Kim Min-jeong
(China) 2022 Hangzhou	Japan; Moka Kuwagata; Ruri Takahashi; Momo Tamaoki; Shiho Tanaka; Wakaba Tomita; Natsumi Tsunoda; Yuhei Oino; Hyoga Ota; Ken Oyoshi; Goki Tajima; Ryoma Tanaka; Aaron Wolf	Uzbekistan; Shukurjon Aminova; Rinata Ilmatova; Sevinch Isokova; Diyora Keldiyorova; Iriskhon Kurbanbaeva; Gulnoza Matniyazova; Shokhrukhkhon Bakhtiyorov; Davlat Bobonov; Sardor Nurillaev; Muso Sobirov; Murodjon Yuldoshev; Alisher Yusupov	China; Cai Qi; Feng Yingying; Ma Zhenzhao; Tang Jing; Xu Shiyan; Zhu Yeqing; Buhebilige; Li Ruixuan; Qingdaga; Sun Chuancheng; Xue Ziyang
(China) 2022 Hangzhou	Japan; Moka Kuwagata; Ruri Takahashi; Momo Tamaoki; Shiho Tanaka; Wakaba Tomita; Natsumi Tsunoda; Yuhei Oino; Hyoga Ota; Ken Oyoshi; Goki Tajima; Ryoma Tanaka; Aaron Wolf	Uzbekistan; Shukurjon Aminova; Rinata Ilmatova; Sevinch Isokova; Diyora Keldiyorova; Iriskhon Kurbanbaeva; Gulnoza Matniyazova; Shokhrukhkhon Bakhtiyorov; Davlat Bobonov; Sardor Nurillaev; Muso Sobirov; Murodjon Yuldoshev; Alisher Yusupov	Mongolia; Amarsaikhany Adiyaasüren; Batsuuriin Nyam-Erdene; Dambadarjaagiin Nominzul; Lkhagvasürengiin Sosorbaram; Lkhagvatogoogiin Enkhriilen; Mönkhtsedeviin Ichinkhorloo; Batkhuyagiin Gonchigsüren; Gantulgyn Altanbagana; Gereltuyaagiin Bolor-Ochir; Odkhüügiin Tsetsentsengel; Tsend-Ochiryn Tsogtbaatar; Yondonperenlein Baskhüü
