= Judo at the 2002 Asian Games =

Judo competition

- Venue: Gudeok Gymnasium
- Dates: 30 September – 3 October 2002
- Competitors: 165 from 30 nations

The Judo competition at the 2002 Asian Games was contested in sixteen weight classes, eight each for men and women at the Gudeok Gymnasium.

== Schedule ==
P	Preliminary rounds & Repechage	F	Finals

Event↓/Date →	30th Mon		1st Tue		2nd Wed		3rd Thu	
Men's 60 kg							P	F
Men's 66 kg					P	F		
Men's 73 kg					P	F		
Men's 81 kg			P	F				
Men's 90 kg			P	F				
Men's 100 kg	P	F						
Men's +100 kg	P	F						
Men's openweight							P	F
Women's 48 kg							P	F
Women's 52 kg					P	F		
Women's 57 kg					P	F		
Women's 63 kg			P	F				
Women's 70 kg			P	F				
Women's 78 kg	P	F						
Women's +78 kg	P	F						
Women's openweight							P	F

== Medalists ==
=== Men ===
Event	Gold	Silver	Bronze
Extra lightweight (−60 kg)	Masoud Haji Akhondzadeh; Iran	Bazarbek Donbay; Kazakhstan	Choi Min-ho; South Korea
Extra lightweight (−60 kg)	Masoud Haji Akhondzadeh; Iran	Bazarbek Donbay; Kazakhstan	Masato Uchishiba; Japan
Half lightweight (−66 kg)	Kim Hyung-ju; South Korea	Guwanç Nurmuhammedow; Turkmenistan	Gantömöriin Dashdavaa; Mongolia
Half lightweight (−66 kg)	Kim Hyung-ju; South Korea	Guwanç Nurmuhammedow; Turkmenistan	Michihiro Omigawa; Japan
Lightweight (−73 kg)	Choi Yong-sin; South Korea	Yusuke Kanamaru; Japan	Hamed Malekmohammadi; Iran
Lightweight (−73 kg)	Choi Yong-sin; South Korea	Yusuke Kanamaru; Japan	Egamnazar Akbarov; Uzbekistan
Half middleweight (−81 kg)	Yoshihiro Akiyama; Japan	Ahn Dong-jin; South Korea	Farkhod Turayev; Uzbekistan
Half middleweight (−81 kg)	Yoshihiro Akiyama; Japan	Ahn Dong-jin; South Korea	Damdinsürengiin Nyamkhüü; Mongolia
Middleweight (−90 kg)	Yuta Yazaki; Japan	Tsend-Ayuushiin Ochirbat; Mongolia	Vyacheslav Pereteyko; Uzbekistan
Middleweight (−90 kg)	Yuta Yazaki; Japan	Tsend-Ayuushiin Ochirbat; Mongolia	Park Sung-keun; South Korea
Half heavyweight (−100 kg)	Keiji Suzuki; Japan	Jang Sung-ho; South Korea	Abbas Fallah; Iran
Half heavyweight (−100 kg)	Keiji Suzuki; Japan	Jang Sung-ho; South Korea	Askhat Zhitkeyev; Kazakhstan
Heavyweight (+100 kg)	Yasuyuki Muneta; Japan	Mahmoud Miran; Iran	Kang Byung-jin; South Korea
Heavyweight (+100 kg)	Yasuyuki Muneta; Japan	Mahmoud Miran; Iran	Vyacheslav Berduta; Kazakhstan
Openweight	Kosei Inoue; Japan	Abdullo Tangriev; Uzbekistan	Mahmoud Miran; Iran
Openweight	Kosei Inoue; Japan	Abdullo Tangriev; Uzbekistan	Liu Shenggang; China

=== Women ===
Event	Gold	Silver	Bronze
Extra lightweight (−48 kg)	Kayo Kitada; Japan	Kim Young-ran; South Korea	Ri Kyong-ok; North Korea
Extra lightweight (−48 kg)	Kayo Kitada; Japan	Kim Young-ran; South Korea	Shao Dan; China
Half lightweight (−52 kg)	Lee Eun-hee; South Korea	Xian Dongmei; China	Kye Sun-hui; North Korea
Half lightweight (−52 kg)	Lee Eun-hee; South Korea	Xian Dongmei; China	Sholpan Kaliyeva; Kazakhstan
Lightweight (−57 kg)	Hong Ok-song; North Korea	Kie Kusakabe; Japan	Khishigbatyn Erdenet-Od; Mongolia
Lightweight (−57 kg)	Hong Ok-song; North Korea	Kie Kusakabe; Japan	Kim Hwa-soo; South Korea
Half middleweight (−63 kg)	Ayumi Tanimoto; Japan	Ji Kyong-sun; North Korea	Wang Chin-fang; Chinese Taipei
Half middleweight (−63 kg)	Ayumi Tanimoto; Japan	Ji Kyong-sun; North Korea	Li Shufang; China
Middleweight (−70 kg)	Qin Dongya; China	Bae Eun-hye; South Korea	Masae Ueno; Japan
Middleweight (−70 kg)	Qin Dongya; China	Bae Eun-hye; South Korea	Liu Shu-yun; Chinese Taipei
Half heavyweight (−78 kg)	Jo Su-hee; South Korea	Mizuho Matsuzaki; Japan	Nasiba Salaýewa; Turkmenistan
Half heavyweight (−78 kg)	Jo Su-hee; South Korea	Mizuho Matsuzaki; Japan	Pan Yuqing; China
Heavyweight (+78 kg)	Sun Fuming; China	Choi Sook-ie; South Korea	Erdene-Ochiryn Dolgormaa; Mongolia
Heavyweight (+78 kg)	Sun Fuming; China	Choi Sook-ie; South Korea	Paradawdee Pestonyee; Thailand
Openweight	Tong Wen; China	Maki Tsukada; Japan	Erdene-Ochiryn Dolgormaa; Mongolia
Openweight	Tong Wen; China	Maki Tsukada; Japan	Jo Su-hee; South Korea

== Medal table ==
Rank	Nation	Gold	Silver	Bronze	Total
1	Japan (JPN)	7	4	3	14
2	South Korea (KOR)	4	5	5	14
3	China (CHN)	3	1	4	8
4	Iran (IRI)	1	1	3	5
5	North Korea (PRK)	1	1	2	4
6	Mongolia (MGL)	0	1	5	6
7	Kazakhstan (KAZ)	0	1	3	4
7	Uzbekistan (UZB)	0	1	3	4
9	Turkmenistan (TKM)	0	1	1	2
10	Chinese Taipei (TPE)	0	0	2	2
11	Thailand (THA)	0	0	1	1
Totals (11 entries)		16	16	32	64

== Participating nations ==
A total of 165 athletes from 30 nations competed in judo at the 2002 Asian Games:

- China (14)
- Chinese Taipei (9)
- Hong Kong (4)
- India (3)
- Indonesia (1)
- Iran (7)
- Japan (16)
- Kazakhstan (13)
- Kuwait (3)
- Kyrgyzstan (7)
- Laos (2)
- Lebanon (1)
- Macau (3)
- Mongolia (14)
- Myanmar (3)
- Nepal (3)
- North Korea (5)
- Pakistan (1)
- Palestine (1)
- Philippines (8)
- Qatar (3)
- Saudi Arabia (2)
- South Korea (14)
- Sri Lanka (2)
- Tajikistan (4)
- Thailand (3)
- Turkmenistan (5)
- Uzbekistan (10)
- Vietnam (2)
- Yemen (2)
