= Judo at the 1998 Asian Games =

Judo competition

- Venue: Thammasat Gymnasium 1
- Dates: 7–10 December 1998
- Competitors: 184 from 25 nations

The Judo competition at the 1998 Asian Games was contested in fourteen weight classes, seven each for men and women, held at the Thammasat University in Thailand.

== Schedule ==
P	Preliminary rounds & Repechage	F	Finals

Event↓/Date →	7th Mon		8th Tue		9th Wed		10th Thu	
Men's 60 kg	P	F						
Men's 66 kg	P	F						
Men's 73 kg			P	F				
Men's 81 kg					P	F		
Men's 90 kg					P	F		
Men's 100 kg							P	F
Men's +100 kg							P	F
Women's 48 kg	P	F						
Women's 52 kg			P	F				
Women's 57 kg			P	F				
Women's 63 kg					P	F		
Women's 70 kg					P	F		
Women's 78 kg							P	F
Women's +78 kg							P	F

== Medalists ==
=== Men ===
Event	Gold	Silver	Bronze
Extra lightweight (−60 kg)	Kazuhiko Tokuno; Japan	Yang Bo; China	Nurbol Suleimenov; Kazakhstan
Extra lightweight (−60 kg)	Kazuhiko Tokuno; Japan	Yang Bo; China	Hyun Seung-hoon; South Korea
Half lightweight (−66 kg)	Yukimasa Nakamura; Japan	Ivan Baglayev; Kazakhstan	Erdenebaataryn Uuganbayar; Mongolia
Half lightweight (−66 kg)	Yukimasa Nakamura; Japan	Ivan Baglayev; Kazakhstan	Arash Miresmaeili; Iran
Lightweight (−73 kg)	Khaliuny Boldbaatar; Mongolia	Kenzo Nakamura; Japan	Kim Dae-wook; South Korea
Lightweight (−73 kg)	Khaliuny Boldbaatar; Mongolia	Kenzo Nakamura; Japan	Andrey Shturbabin; Uzbekistan
Half middleweight (−81 kg)	Cho In-chul; South Korea	Kwak Ok-chol; North Korea	Kazem Sarikhani; Iran
Half middleweight (−81 kg)	Cho In-chul; South Korea	Kwak Ok-chol; North Korea	Ruslan Seilkhanov; Kazakhstan
Middleweight (−90 kg)	Yoo Sung-yeon; South Korea	Yoshio Nakamura; Japan	Kamol Muradov; Uzbekistan
Middleweight (−90 kg)	Yoo Sung-yeon; South Korea	Yoshio Nakamura; Japan	Dashzevegiin Pürevsüren; Mongolia
Half heavyweight (−100 kg)	Kosei Inoue; Japan	Armen Bagdasarov; Uzbekistan	Farhad Maabi; Iran
Half heavyweight (−100 kg)	Kosei Inoue; Japan	Armen Bagdasarov; Uzbekistan	Park Sung-keun; South Korea
Heavyweight (+100 kg)	Shinichi Shinohara; Japan	Mahmoud Miran; Iran	Ochiryn Odgerel; Mongolia
Heavyweight (+100 kg)	Shinichi Shinohara; Japan	Mahmoud Miran; Iran	Pan Song; China

=== Women ===
Event	Gold	Silver	Bronze
Extra lightweight (−48 kg)	Tomoe Makabe; Japan	Cha Hyon-hyang; North Korea	Gao Lijuan; China
Extra lightweight (−48 kg)	Tomoe Makabe; Japan	Cha Hyon-hyang; North Korea	Nuanchan Tangprapassorn; Thailand
Half lightweight (−52 kg)	Kye Sun-hui; North Korea	Kim Hye-sook; South Korea	Li Ying; China
Half lightweight (−52 kg)	Kye Sun-hui; North Korea	Kim Hye-sook; South Korea	Kazue Nagai; Japan
Lightweight (−57 kg)	Khishigbatyn Erdenet-Od; Mongolia	Shen Jun; China	Kie Kusakabe; Japan
Lightweight (−57 kg)	Khishigbatyn Erdenet-Od; Mongolia	Shen Jun; China	Jung Sung-sook; South Korea
Half middleweight (−63 kg)	Wang Xianbo; China	Nami Kimoto; Japan	Wu Mei-ling; Chinese Taipei
Half middleweight (−63 kg)	Wang Xianbo; China	Nami Kimoto; Japan	Kim Hwa-soo; South Korea
Middleweight (−70 kg)	Lim Jung-sook; South Korea	Miki Amao; Japan	Chen Chiu-ping; Chinese Taipei
Middleweight (−70 kg)	Lim Jung-sook; South Korea	Miki Amao; Japan	Song Jianfeng; China
Half heavyweight (−78 kg)	Tang Lin; China	Varvara Massyagina; Kazakhstan	Kang Min-jeong; South Korea
Half heavyweight (−78 kg)	Tang Lin; China	Varvara Massyagina; Kazakhstan	Sambuugiin Dashdulam; Mongolia
Heavyweight (+78 kg)	Yuan Hua; China	Lee Hsiao-hung; Chinese Taipei	Miho Ninomiya; Japan
Heavyweight (+78 kg)	Yuan Hua; China	Lee Hsiao-hung; Chinese Taipei	Paradawdee Pestonyee; Thailand

== Medal table ==
Rank	Nation	Gold	Silver	Bronze	Total
1	Japan (JPN)	5	4	3	12
2	China (CHN)	3	2	4	9
3	South Korea (KOR)	3	1	6	10
4	Mongolia (MGL)	2	0	4	6
5	North Korea (PRK)	1	2	0	3
6	Kazakhstan (KAZ)	0	2	2	4
7	Iran (IRI)	0	1	3	4
8	Chinese Taipei (TPE)	0	1	2	3
8	Uzbekistan (UZB)	0	1	2	3
10	Thailand (THA)	0	0	2	2
Totals (10 entries)		14	14	28	56

== Participating nations ==
A total of 184 athletes from 25 nations competed in judo at the 1998 Asian Games:

- China (12)
- Chinese Taipei (10)
- Hong Kong (5)
- India (5)
- Indonesia (3)
- Iran (7)
- Japan (14)
- Jordan (3)
- Kazakhstan (11)
- Kuwait (4)
- Kyrgyzstan (9)
- Laos (2)
- Lebanon (2)
- Macau (6)
- Mongolia (13)
- North Korea (7)
- Palestine (5)
- Philippines (5)
- South Korea (14)
- Syria (3)
- Tajikistan (7)
- Thailand (14)
- Turkmenistan (10)
- Uzbekistan (9)
- Vietnam (4)
