= 1993 Asian Judo Championships =

Judo competition

The 1993 Asian Judo Championships were held in Portuguese Macau between 13 and 14 November.

== Medal overview ==
=== Men's events ===
Event	Gold	Silver	Bronze
Extra-lightweight (60 kg)	Han Hak-Gwon (KOR)	Yasuo Otoguro (JPN)	D. Narmandakh (MGL)
Extra-lightweight (60 kg)	Han Hak-Gwon (KOR)	Yasuo Otoguro (JPN)	Serik Adiganov (KAZ)
Half-lightweight (65 kg)	Ivan Karazelidi (KAZ)	Bae Sang-Il (KOR)	Masahiko Otobe (JPN)
Half-lightweight (65 kg)	Ivan Karazelidi (KAZ)	Bae Sang-Il (KOR)	Lee (TPE)
Lightweight (71 kg)	Shigeru Toyama (JPN)	Yoon (KOR)	Pak Yong-I (PRK)
Lightweight (71 kg)	Shigeru Toyama (JPN)	Yoon (KOR)	Huang Chien-Lung (TPE)
Half-middleweight (78 kg)	Kozo Kitada (JPN)	Lin Yu-Ming (TPE)	Yoon Dong-Sik (KOR)
Half-middleweight (78 kg)	Kozo Kitada (JPN)	Lin Yu-Ming (TPE)	John Baylon (PHI)
Middleweight (86 kg)	Hirotaka Okada (JPN)	Cho (KOR)	Sergey Alimzhanov (KAZ)
Middleweight (86 kg)	Hirotaka Okada (JPN)	Cho (KOR)	Dalier (IRI)
Half-heavyweight (95 kg)	Shinichiro Soh (JPN)	D. Dorjbat (MGL)	Sergey Shakimov (KAZ)
Half-heavyweight (95 kg)	Shinichiro Soh (JPN)	D. Dorjbat (MGL)	Lee Jung-Young (KOR)
Heavyweight (+95 kg)	Koichiro Mitani (JPN)	Igor Peshkov (KAZ)	Mahmoud Miran (KAZ)
Heavyweight (+95 kg)	Koichiro Mitani (JPN)	Igor Peshkov (KAZ)	B. Badmaanyambuu (MGL)
Openweight	Jun Konno (JPN)	Yoo (KOR)	Mahmoud Miran (KAZ)
Openweight	Jun Konno (JPN)	Yoo (KOR)	B. Badmaanyambuu (MGL)

=== Women's events ===
Event	Gold	Silver	Bronze
Extra-lightweight (48 kg)	Tang Lihong (CHN)	Atsuko Nagai (JPN)	Kim (KOR)
Extra-lightweight (48 kg)	Tang Lihong (CHN)	Atsuko Nagai (JPN)	Huang Yu-Shin (TPE)
Half-lightweight (52 kg)	Hyun Sook-hee (KOR)	Pak (PRK)	Xian Dongmei (CHN)
Half-lightweight (52 kg)	Hyun Sook-hee (KOR)	Pak (PRK)	Tseng Hsiao-Feng (TPE)
Lightweight (56 kg)	Jung Sun-yong (KOR)	Poonam Chopra (IND)	Shizuka Johoji (JPN)
Lightweight (56 kg)	Jung Sun-yong (KOR)	Poonam Chopra (IND)	Hu Rong (CHN)
Half-middleweight (61 kg)	Jung Sung-sook (KOR)	Wu Mei-Ling (TPE)	Yuko Emoto (JPN)
Half-middleweight (61 kg)	Jung Sung-sook (KOR)	Wu Mei-Ling (TPE)	Wu Ching-Hui (HKG)
Middleweight (66 kg)	Cho Min-sun (KOR)	Xu Kun (CHN)	Chen Chiu-Ping (TPE)
Middleweight (66 kg)	Cho Min-sun (KOR)	Xu Kun (CHN)	Noriko Fujimoto (JPN)
Half-heavyweight (72 kg)	Zhao Limin (CHN)	Kim Mi-jung (KOR)	Yuriko Fukuba (JPN)
Half-heavyweight (72 kg)	Zhao Limin (CHN)	Kim Mi-jung (KOR)	Hsu Hui-Yu (TPE)
Heavyweight (+72 kg)	Sun Yanyan (CHN)	Shon Hyun-me (KOR)	Yukari Asada (JPN)
Heavyweight (+72 kg)	Sun Yanyan (CHN)	Shon Hyun-me (KOR)	Gapit (PHI)
Openweight	Gao Dawei (CHN)	Kaori Suzuki (JPN)	Lee Hyun-Kyung (KOR)
Openweight	Gao Dawei (CHN)	Kaori Suzuki (JPN)	Yeh Wen-Hua (TPE)

=== Medals table ===
Rank	Nation	Gold	Silver	Bronze	Total
1	Japan	6	3	6	15
2	South Korea	5	6	4	15
3	China	4	1	2	7
4	Kazakhstan	1	1	5	7
5	Chinese Taipei	0	2	7	9
6	Mongolia	0	1	3	4
7	North Korea	0	1	1	2
8	India	0	1	0	1
9	Philippines	0	0	2	2
10	Hong Kong	0	0	1	1
10	Iran	0	0	1	1
Totals (11 entries)		16	16	32	64
