= Judo at the 1998 Asian Games – Men's 90 kg =

Judo competition

Men's 90 kg at the 1998 Asian Games
- Venue: Thammasat Gymnasium 1
- Date: 9 December 1998
- Competitors: 14 from 14 nations

Medalists
gold medal	Yoo Sung-yeon	South Korea
silver medal	Yoshio Nakamura	Japan
bronze medal	Kamol Muradov	Uzbekistan
bronze medal	Dashzevegiin Pürevsüren	Mongolia

The men's 90 kilograms (Middleweight) competition at the 1998 Asian Games in Bangkok was held on 9 December 1998 at the Thammasat Gymnasium 1.

== Schedule ==
All times are Indochina Time (UTC+07:00)

Date	Time	Event
Wednesday, 9 December 1998	14:00	Round 1
Wednesday, 9 December 1998	14:00	Quarterfinals
Wednesday, 9 December 1998	14:00	Repechage
Wednesday, 9 December 1998	14:00	Semifinals
Wednesday, 9 December 1998	14:00	Finals

== Results ==
Legend

- DEC — Won by decision
- DQ — Won by disqualification
- IPP — Won by ippon
- WAZ — Won by waza-ari
- WO — Won by walkover
- YUK — Won by yuko

=== Main bracket ===
Round 1
Yoshio Nakamura (JPN)	IPP
Samir Amera (PLE)
Sergey Shakimov (KAZ)	IPP
Roland Dino (PHI)
Yaser Al-Hamwy (SYR)
Ao Tegen (CHN)	WO
Yuldash Yusupov (KGZ)
Mohammad Bu Sakher (KUW)	IPP
Kamol Muradov (UZB)	IPP
Dashzevegiin Pürevsüren (MGL)
Manop Leewajanakul (THA)
Yoo Sung-yeon (KOR)	IPP

Quarterfinals
Yoshio Nakamura (JPN)	IPP
Sergey Shakimov (KAZ)
Ao Tegen (CHN)	YUK
Ali Chamanpa (IRI)
Mohammad Bu Sakher (KUW)
Kamol Muradov (UZB)	DQ
Yoo Sung-yeon (KOR)	WO
Khayrullo Nazriev (TJK)

Semifinals
Yoshio Nakamura (JPN)	IPP
Ao Tegen (CHN)
Kamol Muradov (UZB)
Yoo Sung-yeon (KOR)	DEC

Final
Yoshio Nakamura (JPN)
Yoo Sung-yeon (KOR)	DEC

=== Repechage ===
Repechage 1
Samir Amera (PLE)
Sergey Shakimov (KAZ)	IPP
Yaser Al-Hamwy (SYR)
Ali Chamanpa (IRI)	WO
Dashzevegiin Pürevsüren (MGL)	WO
Mohammad Bu Sakher (KUW)
Manop Leewajanakul (THA)	WO
Khayrullo Nazriev (TJK)

Repechage 2
Sergey Shakimov (KAZ)	WAZ
Ali Chamanpa (IRI)
Dashzevegiin Pürevsüren (MGL)	IPP
Manop Leewajanakul (THA)

Bronze medals
Sergey Shakimov (KAZ)
Kamol Muradov (UZB)	IPP
Dashzevegiin Pürevsüren (MGL)	IPP
Ao Tegen (CHN)
