= Wrestling at the 2002 Asian Games – Women's freestyle 72 kg =

Women's freestyle 72 kg at the 2002 Asian Games
- Venue: Yangsan Gymnasium
- Date: 7–8 October 2002
- Competitors: 5 from 5 nations

Medalists
gold medal	Kyoko Hamaguchi	Japan
silver medal	Kang Min-jeong	South Korea
bronze medal	Yana Panova	Kyrgyzstan

The women's freestyle 72 kilograms wrestling competition at the 2002 Asian Games in Busan was held on 7 October and 8 October at the Yangsan Gymnasium.

== Schedule ==
All times are Korea Standard Time (UTC+09:00)

Date	Time	Event
Monday, 7 October 2002	10:00	Round 1
Monday, 7 October 2002	16:00	Round 2
Tuesday, 8 October 2002	10:00	Round 3
Tuesday, 8 October 2002	10:00	Round 4
Tuesday, 8 October 2002	16:00	Round 5

== Results ==
Pos	Athlete	Pld	W	L	CP	TP
1	Kyoko Hamaguchi (JPN)	4	4	0	15	22
2	Kang Min-jeong (KOR)	4	3	1	11	13
3	Yana Panova (KGZ)	4	2	2	6	10
4	Olesýa Nazarenko (TKM)	4	1	3	4	14
5	Gursharan Preet Kaur (IND)	4	0	4	2	6

Source: Report

	Score		CP
Yana Panova (KGZ)	6–0	Olesýa Nazarenko (TKM)	3–0 PO
Gursharan Preet Kaur (IND)	0–6 Fall	Kyoko Hamaguchi (JPN)	0–4 TO
Kang Min-jeong (KOR)	6–1 Fall	Yana Panova (KGZ)	4–0 TO
Olesýa Nazarenko (TKM)	14–4	Gursharan Preet Kaur (IND)	4–1 SP
Gursharan Preet Kaur (IND)	2–3	Yana Panova (KGZ)	1–3 PP
Kyoko Hamaguchi (JPN)	6–0	Kang Min-jeong (KOR)	6–0 PO
Olesýa Nazarenko (TKM)	0–4 Fall	Kyoko Hamaguchi (JPN)	0–4 TO
Gursharan Preet Kaur (IND)	0–4 Fall	Kang Min-jeong (KOR)	0–4 TO
Kyoko Hamaguchi (JPN)	6–0 Fall	Yana Panova (KGZ)	4–0 TO
Kang Min-jeong (KOR)	3–0	Olesýa Nazarenko (TKM)	3–0 PO

== Final standing ==
Rank	Athlete
1st place, gold medalist(s)	Kyoko Hamaguchi (JPN)
2nd place, silver medalist(s)	Kang Min-jeong (KOR)
3rd place, bronze medalist(s)	Yana Panova (KGZ)
4	Olesýa Nazarenko (TKM)
5	Gursharan Preet Kaur (IND)
