= Judo at the 2006 Asian Games – Women's 70 kg =

Judo competition

Women's 70 kg at the 2006 Asian Games
- Venue: Qatar SC Indoor Hall
- Date: 3 December 2006
- Competitors: 12 from 12 nations

Medalists
gold medal	Masae Ueno	Japan
silver medal	Bae Eun-hye	South Korea
bronze medal	Qin Dongya	China
bronze medal	Liu Shu-yun	Chinese Taipei

The women's 70 kilograms (middleweight) competition at the 2006 Asian Games in Doha was held on 3 December at the Qatar SC Indoor Hall.

== Schedule ==
All times are Arabia Standard Time (UTC+03:00)

Date	Time	Event
Sunday, 3 December 2006	14:00	Round of 16
Sunday, 3 December 2006	14:00	Quarterfinals
Sunday, 3 December 2006	14:00	Repechage −1R
Sunday, 3 December 2006	14:00	Repechage final
Sunday, 3 December 2006	14:00	Semifinals
Sunday, 3 December 2006	14:00	Finals

== Results ==
=== Main bracket ===
Round of 16
Masae Ueno (JPN)	0200
Pak Ok-song (PRK)	0000
Nasiba Salaýewa (TKM)	1000
Momotaj Puspo (BAN)	0000
Qin Dongya (CHN)	1000
Elena Proskurakova (KGZ)	0000
Liu Shu-yun (TPE)	0100
Tsedevsürengiin Mönkhzayaa (MGL)	0010

Quarterfinals
Masae Ueno (JPN)	1000
Bùi Thị Hòa (VIE)	0000
Kalzhan Taizhanova (KAZ)	0001
Nasiba Salaýewa (TKM)	1011
Qin Dongya (CHN)	1000
Rawdha Masoud (QAT)	0000
Liu Shu-yun (TPE)	0000
Bae Eun-hye (KOR)	0001

Semifinals
Masae Ueno (JPN)	1000
Nasiba Salaýewa (TKM)	0000
Qin Dongya (CHN)	0000
Bae Eun-hye (KOR)	0100

Gold medal contest
Masae Ueno (JPN)	1000
Bae Eun-hye (KOR)	0000

=== Repechage ===
Repechage −1R
Pak Ok-song (PRK)	0202
Bùi Thị Hòa (VIE)	0000
Momotaj Puspo (BAN)	0000
Kalzhan Taizhanova (KAZ)	1000
Elena Proskurakova (KGZ)	1000
Rawdha Masoud (QAT)	0000

Repechage final
Pak Ok-song (PRK)	0003
Kalzhan Taizhanova (KAZ)	0010
Elena Proskurakova (KGZ)	0000
Liu Shu-yun (TPE)	1010

Bronze medal contest
Kalzhan Taizhanova (KAZ)	0001
Qin Dongya (CHN)	0012
Liu Shu-yun (TPE)	0220
Nasiba Salaýewa (TKM)	0001
