= Liu Shu-yun =

Taiwanese Olympic judoka

Personal information
- Full name: Liu Shu-yun
- Nationality: Chinese Taipei
- Born: 12 October 1980 (age 45) Taipei, Taiwan
- Height: 1.70 m (5 ft 7 in)
- Weight: 70 kg (154 lb)

Sport
- Sport: Judo
- Event: 70 kg
Medal record
Women's judo
Representing Chinese Taipei
Asian Games
Bronze medal – third place	2002 Busan	70 kg
Bronze medal – third place	2006 Doha	70 kg
Asian Championships
Silver medal – second place	2005 Tashkent	70 kg
Bronze medal – third place	2003 Jeju City	70 kg

Liu Shu-yun (Chinese: 劉 書韻; pinyin: Liú Shūyùn; born October 12, 1980, in Taipei) is a Taiwanese judoka, who competed in the women's middleweight category. She captured two bronze medals in the 70-kg division at the Asian Games (2002 and 2006), and represented her nation Chinese Taipei at the 2004 Summer Olympics.

Liu made her sporting debut in an international level at the 2002 Asian Games in Busan, South Korea, where she shared bronze medals with Japan's Masae Ueno in the 70-kg division, steadily defeating Uzbekistan's Lyudmila Kojemyakina in the process. Earlier in the semifinals, Liu missed a chance for her first gold after an ippon defeat to neighboring China's Qin Dongya.

At the 2004 Summer Olympics in Athens, Liu qualified for the Chinese Taipei squad in the women's middleweight class (70 kg), by placing fifth and receiving a berth from the Asian Championships in Almaty, Kazakhstan. Liu received a bye in the opening round, before she succumbed to a waza-ari awasete ippon point and an ushiro kesa gatame (reverse scarf hold) from Belgium's Catherine Jacques with just less than a minute remaining.

Competing on her second Taiwanese team at the 2006 Asian Games in Doha, Qatar, Liu threw Turkmen judoka and fellow Olympic veteran Nasiba Salayeva down the tatami to clinch a bronze medal in the 70-kg division, matching her feat from Busan four years earlier.
