= Kim Young-ran =

Kim Young-ran may refer to:

- Kim Young-ran (actress) (born 1976), South Korean actress
- Kim Young-ran (judoka) (born 1981), South Korean judoka
- Kim Young-ran (field hockey) (born 1985), South Korean field hockey player
