= Judo at the 2002 Asian Games – Women's 70 kg =

Judo competition

Women's 70 kg at the 2002 Asian Games
- Venue: Gudeok Gymnasium
- Date: 1 October 2002
- Competitors: 9 from 9 nations

Medalists
gold medal	Qin Dongya	China
silver medal	Bae Eun-hye	South Korea
bronze medal	Masae Ueno	Japan
bronze medal	Liu Shu-yun	Chinese Taipei

The women's 70 kilograms (Middleweight) competition at the 2002 Asian Games in Busan, South Korea was held on 1 October at the Gudeok Gymnasium.

Qin Dongya of China won the gold medal.

== Schedule ==
All times are Korea Standard Time (UTC+09:00)

Date	Time	Event
Tuesday, 1 October 2002	14:00	1 round
Tuesday, 1 October 2002	14:00	2 round
Tuesday, 1 October 2002	14:00	Repechage 2 round
Tuesday, 1 October 2002	14:00	Semifinals
Tuesday, 1 October 2002	18:00	Finals

== Results ==
=== Main bracket ===
1 round
Karen Soloman (PHI)	0000
Mukharsharyn Enkhtsetseg (MGL)	1122

2 round
Mukharsharyn Enkhtsetseg (MGL)	0100
Liu Shu-yun (TPE)	1021
Qin Dongya (CHN)	0211
Olesýa Nazarenko (TKM)	0000
Lyudmila Kojemyakina (UZB)	0000
Masae Ueno (JPN)	1100
Bae Eun-hye (KOR)	0110
Sagat Abikeyeva (KAZ)	0000

Semifinals
Liu Shu-yun (TPE)	0000
Qin Dongya (CHN)	1001
Masae Ueno (JPN)	0000
Bae Eun-hye (KOR)	0001

Final
Qin Dongya (CHN)	1110
Bae Eun-hye (KOR)	0000

=== Repechage ===
Repechage 2 round
Mukharsharyn Enkhtsetseg (MGL)	0021
Olesýa Nazarenko (TKM)	0001
Lyudmila Kojemyakina (UZB)	1011
Sagat Abikeyeva (KAZ)	0000

Bronze medal match
Mukharsharyn Enkhtsetseg (MGL)	0000
Masae Ueno (JPN)	1000
Lyudmila Kojemyakina (UZB)	0002
Liu Shu-yun (TPE)	0010
