= Judo at the 1998 Asian Games – Women's 63 kg =

Judo competition

Women's 63 kg at the 1998 Asian Games
- Venue: Thammasat Gymnasium 1
- Date: 9 December 1998
- Competitors: 15 from 15 nations

Medalists
gold medal	Wang Xianbo	China
silver medal	Nami Kimoto	Japan
bronze medal	Wu Mei-ling	Chinese Taipei
bronze medal	Kim Hwa-soo	South Korea

The women's 63 kilograms (Half middleweight) competition at the 1998 Asian Games in Bangkok was held on 9 December 1998 at the Thammasat Gymnasium 1.

== Schedule ==
All times are Indochina Time (UTC+07:00)

Date	Time	Event
Wednesday, 9 December 1998	14:00	Round 1
Wednesday, 9 December 1998	14:00	Quarterfinals
Wednesday, 9 December 1998	14:00	Repechage
Wednesday, 9 December 1998	14:00	Semifinals
Wednesday, 9 December 1998	14:00	Finals

== Results ==
Legend

- DEC — Won by decision
- IPP — Won by ippon
- WAZ — Won by waza-ari
- WO — Won by walkover
- YUK — Won by yuko

=== Main bracket ===
Round 1
Olga Artamonova (KGZ)	IPP
Aprilia Marzuki (INA)
Kim Hwa-soo (KOR)	DEC
Wu Mei-ling (TPE)
Aarti Kohli (IND)
Nadežda Želtakowa (TKM)	WAZ
Wang Xianbo (CHN)	IPP
Lai Wai Shan (HKG)
Zhuldyz Aitmagambetova (KAZ)
Nami Kimoto (JPN)	IPP
Chang Choi Chan (MAC)	WO
Khüreldorjiin Batkhishig (MGL)
Chantana Hanprasert (THA)
Marina Mikheyeva (UZB)	IPP

Quarterfinals
Olga Artamonova (KGZ)
Kim Hwa-soo (KOR)	YUK
Nadežda Želtakowa (TKM)
Wang Xianbo (CHN)	IPP
Nami Kimoto (JPN)	IPP
Chang Choi Chan (MAC)
Marina Mikheyeva (UZB)
Ji Kyong-sun (PRK)	IPP

Semifinals
Kim Hwa-soo (KOR)
Wang Xianbo (CHN)	IPP
Nami Kimoto (JPN)	YUK
Ji Kyong-sun (PRK)

Final
Wang Xianbo (CHN)	WAZ
Nami Kimoto (JPN)

=== Repechage ===
Repechage 1
Wu Mei-ling (TPE)	IPP
Olga Artamonova (KGZ)
Lai Wai Shan (HKG)
Nadežda Želtakowa (TKM)	IPP
Zhuldyz Aitmagambetova (KAZ)	IPP
Chang Choi Chan (MAC)

Repechage 2
Wu Mei-ling (TPE)	IPP
Nadežda Želtakowa (TKM)
Zhuldyz Aitmagambetova (KAZ)
Marina Mikheyeva (UZB)	DEC

Bronze medals
Wu Mei-ling (TPE)	YUK
Ji Kyong-sun (PRK)
Marina Mikheyeva (UZB)
Kim Hwa-soo (KOR)	IPP
