= Kim Hyung-ju =

South Korean judoka (born 1976)

Personal information
- Born: 14 March 1976 (age 50)
- Occupation: Judoka

Korean name
- Hangul: 김형주
- Hanja: 金炯周
- RR: Gim Hyeongju
- MR: Kim Hyŏngju

Sport
- Country: South Korea
- Sport: Judo
- Weight class: ‍–‍66 kg

Achievements and titles
- World Champ.: (bronze) (2001)
- Asian Champ.: (gold) (2002)
Medal record
Men's judo
Representing South Korea
World Championships
Bronze medal – third place	2001 Munich	‍–‍66 kg
Asian Games
Gold medal – first place	2002 Busan	‍–‍66 kg
Asian Championships
Silver medal – second place	2000 Osaka	‍–‍66 kg
IJF Grand Prix
Silver medal – second place	2009 Hamburg	‍–‍66 kg
East Asian Games
Bronze medal – third place	2001 Osaka	‍–‍66 kg

Profile at external databases
- IJF: 4061
- JudoInside.com: 3696
- Updated on 3 January 2023

Kim Hyung-ju (born 14 March 1976 in South Korea) is a male South Korean judoka who competed in the half-lightweight category. His wife, Lee Eun-hee, is also a judoka.
