= Judo at the 1998 Asian Games – Women's 70 kg =

Judo competition

Women's 70 kg at the 1998 Asian Games
- Venue: Thammasat Gymnasium 1
- Date: 9 December 1998
- Competitors: 8 from 8 nations

Medalists
gold medal	Lim Jung-sook	South Korea
silver medal	Miki Amao	Japan
bronze medal	Chen Chiu-ping	Chinese Taipei
bronze medal	Song Jianfeng	China

The women's 70 kilograms (Middleweight) competition at the 1998 Asian Games in Bangkok was held on 9 December 1998 at the Thammasat Gymnasium 1.

== Schedule ==
All times are Indochina Time (UTC+07:00)

Date	Time	Event
Wednesday, 9 December 1998	14:00	Quarterfinals
Wednesday, 9 December 1998	14:00	Repechage
Wednesday, 9 December 1998	14:00	Semifinals
Wednesday, 9 December 1998	14:00	Finals

== Results ==
Legend

- IPP — Won by ippon
- KOK — Won by koka
- YUK — Won by yuko

=== Main bracket ===
Quarterfinals
Lim Jung-sook (KOR)	IPP
Choyondorjiin Bazarsüren (MGL)
Song Jianfeng (CHN)	IPP
Chen Chiu-ping (TPE)
Sujeera Uraiphong (THA)
Olesýa Nazarenko (TKM)	IPP
Takhmina Mukhamedova (KGZ)
Miki Amao (JPN)	IPP

Semifinals
Lim Jung-sook (KOR)	KOK
Song Jianfeng (CHN)
Olesýa Nazarenko (TKM)
Miki Amao (JPN)	IPP

Final
Lim Jung-sook (KOR)	YUK
Miki Amao (JPN)

=== Repechage ===
Repechage 1
Choyondorjiin Bazarsüren (MGL)
Chen Chiu-ping (TPE)	KOK
Sujeera Uraiphong (THA)	IPP
Takhmina Mukhamedova (KGZ)

Bronze medals
Chen Chiu-ping (TPE)	IPP
Olesýa Nazarenko (TKM)
Sujeera Uraiphong (THA)
Song Jianfeng (CHN)	IPP
