= Sambuugiin Dashdulam =

Mongolian judoka (born 1974)

Personal information
- Born: 27 March 1974 (age 52)
- Occupation: Judoka

Sport
- Country: Mongolia
- Sport: Judo
- Weight class: ‍–‍78 kg, Open

Achievements and titles
- Olympic Games: 9th (2000)
- World Champ.: 9th (1995, 2001)
- Asian Champ.: (bronze) (1991, 1994, 1998, 2000, 2001)
Medal record
Women's judo
Representing Mongolia
Asian Games
Bronze medal – third place	1994 Hiroshima	Open
Bronze medal – third place	1998 Bangkok	‍–‍78 kg
Asian Championships
Bronze medal – third place	1991 Osaka	Open
Bronze medal – third place	2000 Osaka	‍–‍78 kg
Bronze medal – third place	2001 Ulaanbaatar	‍–‍78 kg

Profile at external databases
- IJF: 13927
- JudoInside.com: 10040
- Updated on 1 April 2024

Sambuugiin Dashdulam (born 27 March 1974) is a Mongolian judoka. She competed in the women's half-heavyweight event at the 2000 Summer Olympics.
