= Judo at the 2006 Asian Games – Men's +100 kg =

Judo competition

Men's +100 kg at the 2006 Asian Games
- Venue: Qatar SC Indoor Hall
- Date: 2 December 2006
- Competitors: 12 from 12 nations

Medalists
gold medal	Yasuyuki Muneta	Japan
silver medal	Mohammad Reza Roudaki	Iran
bronze medal	Abdullo Tangriev	Uzbekistan
bronze medal	Yeldos Ikhsangaliyev	Kazakhstan

The men's +100 kilograms (heavyweight) competition at the 2006 Asian Games in Doha was held on 2 December at the Qatar SC Indoor Hall.

== Schedule ==
All times are Arabia Standard Time (UTC+03:00)

Date	Time	Event
Saturday, 2 December 2006	14:00	Round of 16
Saturday, 2 December 2006	14:00	Quarterfinals
Saturday, 2 December 2006	14:00	Repechage −1R
Saturday, 2 December 2006	14:00	Repechage final
Saturday, 2 December 2006	14:00	Semifinals
Saturday, 2 December 2006	14:00	Finals

== Results ==
=== Main bracket ===
Round of 16
Makhmadamin Khonov (TJK)	1010
Tomohiko Hoshina (PHI)	0002
Abdullo Tangriev (UZB)	1101
Khaled Al-Araifi (BRN)	0000
Mohammed Al-Qurashi (KSA)	0010
Tharalat Sutthiphun (THA)	1000
Baeg Chul-sung (KOR)	0110
Naidangiin Tüvshinbayar (MGL)	0001

Quarterfinals
Makhmadamin Khonov (TJK)	0000
Yeldos Ikhsangaliyev (KAZ)	1000
Yasuyuki Muneta (JPN)	0002
Abdullo Tangriev (UZB)	0001
Tharalat Sutthiphun (THA)	0000
Mohammad Reza Roudaki (IRI)	1000
Baeg Chul-sung (KOR)	0100
Khaled Al-Enezi (KUW)	0000

Semifinals
Yeldos Ikhsangaliyev (KAZ)	0001
Yasuyuki Muneta (JPN)	1010
Mohammad Reza Roudaki (IRI)	0011
Baeg Chul-sung (KOR)	0000

Gold medal contest
Yasuyuki Muneta (JPN)	0120
Mohammad Reza Roudaki (IRI)	0001

=== Repechage ===
Repechage −1R
Naidangiin Tüvshinbayar (MGL)	1101
Khaled Al-Enezi (KUW)	0000

Repechage final
Makhmadamin Khonov (TJK)	0000
Abdullo Tangriev (UZB)	1010
Tharalat Sutthiphun (THA)	0000
Naidangiin Tüvshinbayar (MGL)	1020

Bronze medal contest
Abdullo Tangriev (UZB)	1001
Baeg Chul-sung (KOR)	0000
Naidangiin Tüvshinbayar (MGL)	0011
Yeldos Ikhsangaliyev (KAZ)	1101
