= Judo at the 2006 Asian Games – Women's 48 kg =

Judo competition

Women's 48 kg at the 2006 Asian Games
- Venue: Qatar SC Indoor Hall
- Date: 5 December 2006
- Competitors: 14 from 14 nations

Medalists
gold medal	Gao Feng	China
silver medal	Kim Young-ran	South Korea
bronze medal	Kelbet Nurgazina	Kazakhstan
bronze medal	Misato Nakamura	Japan

The women's 48 kilograms (extra lightweight) competition at the 2006 Asian Games in Doha was held on 5 December at the Qatar SC Indoor Hall.

== Schedule ==
All times are Arabia Standard Time (UTC+03:00)

Date	Time	Event
Tuesday, 5 December 2006	14:00	Round of 16
Tuesday, 5 December 2006	14:00	Quarterfinals
Tuesday, 5 December 2006	14:00	Repechage −1R
Tuesday, 5 December 2006	14:00	Repechage final
Tuesday, 5 December 2006	14:00	Semifinals
Tuesday, 5 December 2006	14:00	Finals

== Results ==
=== Main bracket ===
Round of 16
Misato Nakamura (JPN)	0001
Kim Song-gum (PRK)	0000
Saliha Masoud (QAT)	0000
Văn Ngọc Tú (VIE)	0211
Zinura Djuraeva (UZB)	0000
Erdenechimegiin Gereltuyaa (MGL)	1000
Gao Feng (CHN)	1010
Amanda Abi Nader (LIB)	0000
Chamila Wijerathna (SRI)	0000
Kelbet Nurgazina (KAZ)	1001
Leong Siu Pou (MAC)	0001
L. Bembem Devi (IND)	0011

Quarterfinals
Misato Nakamura (JPN)	1010
Văn Ngọc Tú (VIE)	0000
Kim Young-ran (KOR)	1010
Erdenechimegiin Gereltuyaa (MGL)	0000
Nancy Quillotes (PHI)	0000
Gao Feng (CHN)	0200
Kelbet Nurgazina (KAZ)	0010
L. Bembem Devi (IND)	0000

Semifinals
Misato Nakamura (JPN)	0000
Kim Young-ran (KOR)	0001
Gao Feng (CHN)	1010
Kelbet Nurgazina (KAZ)	0000

Gold medal contest
Kim Young-ran (KOR)	0000
Gao Feng (CHN)	0200

=== Repechage ===
Repechage −1R
Kim Song-gum (PRK)	0000
Văn Ngọc Tú (VIE)	1000
Amanda Abi Nader (LIB)	0000
Nancy Quillotes (PHI)	1010
Chamila Wijerathna (SRI)	0001
L. Bembem Devi (IND)	1010

Repechage final
Văn Ngọc Tú (VIE)	0011
Erdenechimegiin Gereltuyaa (MGL)	0101
Nancy Quillotes (PHI)	0010
L. Bembem Devi (IND)	0100

Bronze medal contest
Erdenechimegiin Gereltuyaa (MGL)	0000
Kelbet Nurgazina (KAZ)	0100
L. Bembem Devi (IND)	0000
Misato Nakamura (JPN)	1000
