= Lee Jeong-yeong =

South Korean handball player (born 1979)

Personal information
- Nationality: South Korean
- Born: 3 January 1979 (age 47)

Sport
- Sport: Handball

Lee Jeong-yeong (Korean: 이정영; born 3 January 1979) is a South Korean handball player. She competed in the women's tournament at the 2000 Summer Olympics.
