= Yoo Sung-yeon =

South Korean judoka (born 1976)

Personal information
- Born: 19 April 1976 (age 50)
- Occupation: Judoka

Sport
- Country: South Korea
- Sport: Judo
- Weight class: ‍–‍90 kg

Achievements and titles
- Olympic Games: R16 (2000)
- World Champ.: (bronze) (1999)
- Asian Champ.: (gold) (1998)
Medal record
Men's judo
Representing South Korea
World Championships
Bronze medal – third place	1999 Birmingham	‍–‍90 kg
Asian Games
Gold medal – first place	1998 Bangkok	‍–‍90 kg
IJF Grand Prix
Bronze medal – third place	2009 Qingdao	‍–‍90 kg
Summer Universiade
Bronze medal – third place	1999 Palma de Mallorca	‍–‍90 kg

Profile at external databases
- IJF: 1848
- JudoInside.com: 8855, 61726
- Updated on 3 January 2023

Yoo Sung-Yeon (born 19 April 1976) is a South Korean former judoka who competed in the 2000 Summer Olympics.
