= Ivan Karazelidi =

Kazakh judoka

Personal information
- Nationality: Kazakhstani
- Born: Karaganda, Kazakh SSR, Soviet Union

Sport
- Sport: Judo
Medal record
Representing Kazakhstan
Men's judo
Asian Games
Silver medal – second place	1994 Hiroshima	–65 kg
Asian Championships
Gold medal – first place	1993 Macao	–65 kg

Ivan Karazelidi (Иван Саввович Каразелиди, born 9 February 1972) is a Kazakhstani judoka who was the 1993 Asian Champion in the men's half-lightweight (–65 kg) category.
