= Shigeru Toyama =

Japanese judoka (born 1970)

Personal information
- Born: 3 December 1970 (age 55)
- Occupation: Judoka

Sport
- Sport: Judo
Medal record
Representing Japan
Men's Judo
Asian Games
Silver medal – second place	1994 Hiroshima	-71 kg
Asian Championships
Gold medal – first place	1993 Macau	-71 kg

Profile at external databases
- JudoInside.com: 2979

Shigeru Toyama (藤山 茂, Tōyama Shigetu; born December 3, 1970) is a Japanese judoka.

He was born in Ōbu, Aichi, and began judo at the age of a first grader.

After graduating from Tokai University, He entered the Sohgo Security Services. He won a gold medal at the -71 kg category of the Asian Championships in 1993 and silver medal at Asian Games in 1994. .

Toyama retired in 1996 and as of 2009, Toyama coaches judo at his alma mater, Doho high school, where he previously studied as an undergraduate.

== Achievements ==
- 1988
  - All-Japan Junior Championships (-71 kg) 1st
  - Inter-highschool championships (-71 kg) 5th
- 1990
  - All-Japan Junior Championships (-71 kg) 1st
- 1992
  - Jigoro Kano Cup (-71 kg) 3rd
  - Hamburg Super World Cup (-71 kg) 3rd
  - All-Japan Selected Championships (-71 kg) 2nd
  - Kodokan Cup (-71 kg) 3rd
- 1993
  - Asian Championships (-71 kg) 1st
  - All-Japan Selected Championships (-71 kg) 3rd
  - Kodokan Cup (-71 kg) 3rd
- 1994
  - Asian Games (-71 kg) 2nd
  - Jigoro Kano Cup (-71 kg) 3rd
  - A-Tournament Budapest Bank Cup (-71 kg) 1st
  - All-Japan Selected Championships (-71 kg) 1st
  - Kodokan Cup (-71 kg) 1st
