= Wang Xianbo =

Chinese judo olympic medalist

Personal information
- Born: 28 August 1976 (age 50)
- Occupation: Judoka

Sport
- Country: China
- Sport: Judo
- Weight class: ‍–‍63 kg, ‍–‍66 kg

Achievements and titles
- Olympic Games: (bronze) (1996)
- World Champ.: 9th (1997)
- Asian Champ.: (gold) (1996, 1998)
Medal record
Women's judo
Representing China
Olympic Games
Bronze medal – third place	1996 Atlanta	‍–‍66 kg
Asian Games
Gold medal – first place	1998 Bangkok	‍–‍63 kg
Asian Championships
Gold medal – first place	1996 Ho Chi Minh	‍–‍66 kg
Bronze medal – third place	1995 New Delhi	‍–‍66 kg

Profile at external databases
- IJF: 53343
- JudoInside.com: 927
- Updated on 4 June 2023

Wang Xianbo (simplified Chinese: 王显波; traditional Chinese: 王顕波; pinyin: Wáng Xiǎnbō) (born 28 August 1976) is a Chinese judoka and Olympic medalist. She competed at the 1996 Summer Olympics in Atlanta, winning a bronze medal in the middleweight class.
