= Judo at the 2002 Asian Games – Women's 48 kg =

Judo competition

Women's 48 kg at the 2002 Asian Games
- Venue: Gudeok Gymnasium
- Date: 3 October 2002
- Competitors: 12 from 12 nations

Medalists
gold medal	Kayo Kitada	Japan
silver medal	Kim Young-ran	South Korea
bronze medal	Ri Kyong-ok	North Korea
bronze medal	Shao Dan	China

The women's 48 kilograms (Extra lightweight) competition at the 2002 Asian Games in Busan was held on 3 October at the Gudeok Gymnasium.

== Schedule ==
All times are Korea Standard Time (UTC+09:00)

Date	Time	Event
Thursday, 3 October 2002	14:00	1 round
Thursday, 3 October 2002	14:00	2 round
Thursday, 3 October 2002	14:00	Repechage 1 round
Thursday, 3 October 2002	14:00	Repechage 2 round
Thursday, 3 October 2002	14:00	Semifinals
Thursday, 3 October 2002	18:00	Finals

== Results ==
=== Main bracket ===
1 round
Tatyana Shishkina (KAZ)	0002
Erdenechimegiin Gereltuyaa (MGL)	0002
Nuanchan Tangprapassorn (THA)	0000
Yu Ying-ying (TPE)	1010
Nancy Quillotes (PHI)	0000
Kim Young-ran (KOR)	1000
Shao Dan (CHN)	0011
Ri Kyong-ok (PRK)	0100
Leong Siu Pou (MAC)	0000
Zinura Djuraeva (UZB)	1020

2 round
Erdenechimegiin Gereltuyaa (MGL)	1001
Hình Mỹ Linh (VIE)	0001
Yu Ying-ying (TPE)	0010
Kim Young-ran (KOR)	0011
Ri Kyong-ok (PRK)
Bye
Kayo Kitada (JPN)	1001
Zinura Djuraeva (UZB)	0000

Semifinals
Erdenechimegiin Gereltuyaa (MGL)	0000
Kim Young-ran (KOR)	0010
Ri Kyong-ok (PRK)	0001
Kayo Kitada (JPN)	0201

Final
Kim Young-ran (KOR)	0001
Kayo Kitada (JPN)	0021

=== Repechage ===
Repechage 1 round
Tatyana Shishkina (KAZ)	1000
Hình Mỹ Linh (VIE)	0000
Nancy Quillotes (PHI)	0000
Yu Ying-ying (TPE)	1000
Shao Dan (CHN)
Bye

Repechage 2 round
Tatyana Shishkina (KAZ)	0001
Yu Ying-ying (TPE)	0000
Shao Dan (CHN)	1010
Zinura Djuraeva (UZB)	0010

Bronze medal match
Tatyana Shishkina (KAZ)	0100
Ri Kyong-ok (PRK)	1010
Shao Dan (CHN)	1000
Erdenechimegiin Gereltuyaa (MGL)	0001
