= Judo at the 2002 Asian Games – Women's 78 kg =

Judo competition

Women's 78 kg at the 2002 Asian Games
- Venue: Gudeok Gymnasium
- Date: 30 September 2002
- Competitors: 7 from 7 nations

Medalists
gold medal	Jo Su-hee	South Korea
silver medal	Mizuho Matsuzaki	Japan
bronze medal	Nasiba Salaýewa	Turkmenistan
bronze medal	Pan Yuqing	China

The women's 78 kilograms (Half heavyweight) competition at the 2002 Asian Games in Busan was held on 30 September at the Gudeok Gymnasium.

== Schedule ==
All times are Korea Standard Time (UTC+09:00)

Date	Time	Event
Monday, 30 September 2002	14:00	1 round
Monday, 30 September 2002	14:00	Repechage 1 round
Monday, 30 September 2002	14:00	Semifinals
Monday, 30 September 2002	18:00	Finals

== Results ==
Legend

- WO — Won by walkover

=== Main bracket ===
1 round
Nasiba Salaýewa (TKM)	0000
Pan Yuqing (CHN)	0110
Dorjgotovyn Tserenkhand (MGL)	WO
Tamara Yugay (UZB)
Aisa Marie Ano (PHI)	0000
Jo Su-hee (KOR)	1021

Semifinals
Pan Yuqing (CHN)	0001
Mizuho Matsuzaki (JPN)	1000
Dorjgotovyn Tserenkhand (MGL)	0000
Jo Su-hee (KOR)	1000

Final
Mizuho Matsuzaki (JPN)	0000
Jo Su-hee (KOR)	0120

=== Repechage ===
Repechage 1 round
Tamara Yugay (UZB)
Aisa Marie Ano (PHI)	WO

Bronze medal match
Nasiba Salaýewa (TKM)	1000
Dorjgotovyn Tserenkhand (MGL)	0000
Aisa Marie Ano (PHI)	0000
Pan Yuqing (CHN)	1000
