= Judo at the 2002 Asian Games – Women's openweight =

Judo competition

Women's openweight at the 2002 Asian Games
- Venue: Gudeok Gymnasium
- Date: 3 October 2002
- Competitors: 9 from 9 nations

Medalists
| gold medal | Tong Wen | China |
| silver medal | Maki Tsukada | Japan |
| bronze medal | Erdene-Ochiryn Dolgormaa | Mongolia |
| bronze medal | Jo Su-hee | South Korea |

The women's openweight competition at the 2002 Asian Games in Busan, South Korea was held on 3 October at the Gudeok Gymnasium with nine competitors from nine countries.

Tong Wen of China won the gold medal.

== Schedule ==
All times are Korea Standard Time (UTC+09:00)

| Date | Time | Event |
|---|---|---|
| Thursday, 3 October 2002 | 14:00 | 1 round |
| Thursday, 3 October 2002 | 14:00 | 2 round |
| Thursday, 3 October 2002 | 14:00 | Repechage 2 round |
| Thursday, 3 October 2002 | 14:00 | Semifinals |
| Thursday, 3 October 2002 | 18:00 | Finals |

== Results ==
=== Main bracket ===
1 round
Lee Hsiao-hung (TPE) | 1000
Lay Nandar Aung (MYA) | 0000

2 round
Tong Wen (CHN) | 1010
Lee Hsiao-hung (TPE) | 0000
Jo Su-hee (KOR) | 1042
Nasiba Salaýewa (TKM) | 0000
Maki Tsukada (JPN) | 1000
Sagat Abikeyeva (KAZ) | 0000
Aisa Marie Ano (PHI) | 0000
Erdene-Ochiryn Dolgormaa (MGL) | 1000

Semifinals
Tong Wen (CHN) | 0021
Jo Su-hee (KOR) | 0001
Maki Tsukada (JPN) | 1000
Erdene-Ochiryn Dolgormaa (MGL) | 0000

Final
Tong Wen (CHN) | 1011
Maki Tsukada (JPN) | 0010

=== Repechage ===
Repechage 2 round
Lee Hsiao-hung (TPE) | 1100
Nasiba Salaýewa (TKM) | 0000
Sagat Abikeyeva (KAZ) | 1100
Aisa Marie Ano (PHI) | 0000

Bronze medal match
Lee Hsiao-hung (TPE) | 0001
Erdene-Ochiryn Dolgormaa (MGL) | 0011
Sagat Abikeyeva (KAZ) | 0000
Jo Su-hee (KOR) | 1000
