= Ao Tegen =

Chinese judoka

Personal information
- Nationality: Chinese
- Born: 12 June 1975 (age 50)

Sport
- Sport: Judo

Ao Tegen (Chinese: 敖特根; pinyin: Áo Tè-gēn; born 12 June 1975) is a Chinese judoka. He competed in the men's middleweight event at the 1996 Summer Olympics.
