= Judo at the 1998 Asian Games – Women's 78 kg =

Judo competition

Women's 78 kg at the 1998 Asian Games
- Venue: Thammasat Gymnasium 1
- Date: 10 December 1998
- Competitors: 9 from 9 nations

Medalists
gold medal	Tang Lin	China
silver medal	Varvara Massyagina	Kazakhstan
bronze medal	Kang Min-jeong	South Korea
bronze medal	Sambuugiin Dashdulam	Mongolia

The women's 78 kilograms (Half heavyweight) competition at the 1998 Asian Games in Bangkok was held on 10 December 1998 at the Thammasat Gymnasium 1.

== Schedule ==
All times are Indochina Time (UTC+07:00)

Date	Time	Event
Thursday, 10 December 1998	14:00	Round 1
Thursday, 10 December 1998	14:00	Quarterfinals
Thursday, 10 December 1998	14:00	Repechage
Thursday, 10 December 1998	14:00	Semifinals
Thursday, 10 December 1998	14:00	Finals

== Results ==
Legend

- DEC — Won by decision
- IPP — Won by ippon
- KOK — Won by koka
- WAZ — Won by waza-ari
- WO — Won by walkover
- YUK — Won by yuko

=== Main bracket ===
Round 1
Tang Lin (CHN)	IPP
Kanjana Mekhanon (THA)

Quarterfinals
Tang Lin (CHN)	DEC
Noriko Anno (JPN)
Sambuugiin Dashdulam (MGL)	DEC
Kang Min-jeong (KOR)
Louize Bourached (LIB)
Varvara Massyagina (KAZ)	WO
Olga Znamenskaýa (TKM)
Yeh Wen-hua (TPE)	WAZ

Semifinals
Tang Lin (CHN)	KOK
Sambuugiin Dashdulam (MGL)
Varvara Massyagina (KAZ)	KOK
Yeh Wen-hua (TPE)

Final
Tang Lin (CHN)	IPP
Varvara Massyagina (KAZ)

=== Repechage ===
Repechage 1
Kanjana Mekhanon (THA)
Noriko Anno (JPN)	IPP

Repechage 2
Noriko Anno (JPN)
Kang Min-jeong (KOR)	WAZ
Louize Bourached (LIB)
Olga Znamenskaýa (TKM)	WO

Bronze medals
Kang Min-jeong (KOR)	IPP
Yeh Wen-hua (TPE)
Olga Znamenskaýa (TKM)
Sambuugiin Dashdulam (MGL)	YUK
