= Kim Young-ran (judoka) =

South Korean Olympic judoka

Personal information
- Born: 5 March 1981 (age 45) Icheon, Gyeonggi, South Korea
- Occupation: Judoka
- Height: 1.54 m (5 ft 1 in)

Korean name
- Hangul: 김영란
- RR: Gim Yeongran
- MR: Kim Yŏngnan

Sport
- Country: South Korea
- Sport: Judo
- Weight class: ‍–‍48 kg
- Club: Incheon Dong-gu Cheong
- Coached by: Lee Bong-hun

Achievements and titles
- Olympic Games: 9th (2008)
- World Champ.: 5th (2001, 2007)
- Asian Champ.: (gold) (2003)
Medal record
Women's judo
Representing South Korea
Asian Games
Silver medal – second place	2002 Busan	‍–‍48 kg
Silver medal – second place	2006 Doha	‍–‍48 kg
Asian Championships
Gold medal – first place	2003 Jeju	‍–‍48 kg
Silver medal – second place	2007 Kuwait City	‍–‍48 kg
Bronze medal – third place	2005 Tashkent	‍–‍48 kg
IJF Grand Prix
Bronze medal – third place	2009 Qingdao	‍–‍48 kg

Profile at external databases
- IJF: 1852
- JudoInside.com: 13899
- Updated on 3 January 2023

Kim Young-ran (Korean: 김영란; born 5 March 1981 in Icheon, Gyeonggi) is a South Korean judoka, who played for the extra-lightweight category. She is a three-time medalist (gold, silver, and bronze) for the 48 kg class at the Asian Judo Championships. She also won two silver medals in the same division at the 2002 Asian Games in Busan, and at the 2006 Asian Games in Doha, Qatar, losing out to Japan's Kayo Kitada, and China's Gao Feng, respectively.

Kim represented South Korea at the 2008 Summer Olympics in Beijing, where she competed for the women's extra-lightweight class (48 kg). She defeated Ukraine's Lyudmyla Lusnikova in the preliminary rounds, before losing out the quarterfinal match, by an ippon and an uchi mata gaeshi (inner thigh counter) to Romania's Alina Alexandra Dumitru. Because her opponent advanced further into the final match, Kim offered another shot for the bronze medal by entering the repechage rounds. Unfortunately, she finished only in ninth place, after losing out the second repechage bout to Hungary's Éva Csernoviczki, who successfully scored a koka, and a kouchi gari (small inner reap), at the end of the five-minute period.
