= Yasuyuki Muneta =

Japanese judoka (born 1981)

Personal information
- Nationality: Japanese
- Born: 10 February 1981 (age 45) Matsuyama, Ehime
- Occupation: Judoka
- Height: 170 cm (5 ft 7 in)

Sport
- Country: Japan
- Sport: Judo
- Weight class: +100 kg

Achievements and titles
- World Champ.: (gold) (2003, 2007)
- Asian Champ.: (gold) (2000, 2002, 2006)
Medal record
Men's judo
Representing Japan
World Championships
Gold medal – first place	2003 Osaka	+100 kg
Gold medal – first place	2007 Rio de Janeiro	Open
Silver medal – second place	2005 Cairo	+100 kg
Asian Games
Gold medal – first place	2002 Busan	+100 kg
Gold medal – first place	2006 Doha	+100 kg
Asian Championships
Gold medal – first place	2000 Osaka	+100 kg
IJF Grand Slam
Silver medal – second place	2008 Tokyo	+100 kg
Bronze medal – third place	2009 Rio de Janeiro	+100 kg
IJF Grand Prix
Bronze medal – third place	2009 Hamburg	+100 kg
World Juniors Championships
Silver medal – second place	1998 Cali	+100 kg
Summer Universiade
Gold medal – first place	1999 Palma de Mallorca	+100 kg

Profile at external databases
- IJF: 81
- JudoInside.com: 1031
- Updated on 19 November 2022

Yasuyuki Muneta (棟田 康幸, Muneta Yasuyuki; born 10 February 1981) is a Japanese judoka. He won two gold medals and a silver medal at the World Judo Championships.

== Career ==
He is from Matsuyama, Ehime. After graduation from Meiji University, He belonged to Tokyo Metropolitan Police Department. He is currently a Japan heavyweight division player.

Muneta was born in Matsuyama, Ehime prefecture, in 1981. Having been taught foundations of jacket wrestling by his father as a child, after graduating from primary school, he entered the prestigious Kodo-school, which is well known for its judo. After graduating from Tsurumaki junior high school he continued on to Setagaya Gakuen senior high school. In 1998, while in third grade at Setagaya Gakuen, he led his school's judo team to victory in the final match against Kokushikan senior high school's team by accomplishing, for the first time in history, a four man in a row victory during the Kinshuki High School Judo Tournament. Individually, having won both the All-Japan High School Judo Championships as well as the Inter-High Tournament, he is also the youngest ever winner of the Kano Jigoro Cup. He was mentioned as the strongest senior high school judo athlete both in name and reality.

After graduating from Setagaya Gakuen senior high school, Muneta entered Meiji University. During his university period he won the Kodokan Cup (1999 and 2001), participated in the World Judo Championships as well as many other world top level tournaments. Furthermore, he has been elected as the “most excellent player” 4 years in a row at the All-Japan University Judo Championships (including Yasuhiro Yamashita, Masaki Yoshimi and Muneta Yasuyuki, there are only 5 athletes in the history of judo that have been elected “most excellent athlete” 4 years in a row).

After graduating from university he found employment at the Japanese National Police Agency. By defeating powerful judo athletes like Tamerlan Tmenov (Russia) at the 2003 World Judo Championships in Osaka, he became world champion in the +100 kg division at the age of 22. At the 2007 World Judo Championships in Rio de Janeiro he was victorious in the open division. He holds the 7th Dan in Kodokan judo.
