= Judo at the 1998 Asian Games – Women's 52 kg =

Judo competition

Women's 52 kg at the 1998 Asian Games
- Venue: Thammasat Gymnasium 1
- Date: 8 December 1998
- Competitors: 13 from 13 nations

Medalists
gold medal	Kye Sun-hui	North Korea
silver medal	Kim Hye-sook	South Korea
bronze medal	Li Ying	China
bronze medal	Kazue Nagai	Japan

The women's 52 kilograms (Half lightweight) competition at the 1998 Asian Games in Bangkok, Thailand was held on 8 December 1998 at the Thammasat Gymnasium 1.

== Schedule ==
All times are Indochina Time (UTC+07:00)

Date	Time	Event
Tuesday, 8 December 1998	14:00	Round 1
Tuesday, 8 December 1998	14:00	Quarterfinals
Tuesday, 8 December 1998	14:00	Repechage
Tuesday, 8 December 1998	14:00	Semifinals
Tuesday, 8 December 1998	14:00	Finals

== Results ==
Legend

- IPP — Won by ippon
- WAZ — Won by waza-ari
- WO — Won by walkover
- YUK — Won by yuko

=== Main bracket ===
Round 1
Mou Son Cheng (MAC)
Shih Pei-chun (TPE)	IPP
Kazue Nagai (JPN)	IPP
Chan Mei Ling (HKG)
Kim Hye-sook (KOR)	IPP
Li Ying (CHN)
Inna Tsoi (KGZ)	YUK
Tatýana Iwaşina (TKM)
Mijiddorjiin Sarangua (MGL)
Kye Sun-hui (PRK)	WO

Quarterfinals
Shih Pei-chun (TPE)
Kazue Nagai (JPN)	IPP
Kim Hye-sook (KOR)	IPP
Roongtawan Jindasing (THA)
Inna Tsoi (KGZ)	IPP
Anuradha (IND)
Kye Sun-hui (PRK)	IPP
Putri Rahayu (INA)

Semifinals
Kazue Nagai (JPN)
Kim Hye-sook (KOR)	WAZ
Inna Tsoi (KGZ)
Kye Sun-hui (PRK)	YUK

Final
Kim Hye-sook (KOR)
Kye Sun-hui (PRK)	YUK

=== Repechage ===
Repechage 1
Chan Mei Ling (HKG)	YUK
Shih Pei-chun (TPE)
Li Ying (CHN)	IPP
Roongtawan Jindasing (THA)
Tatýana Iwaşina (TKM)	IPP
Anuradha (IND)
Mijiddorjiin Sarangua (MGL)
Putri Rahayu (INA)	WO

Repechage 2
Chan Mei Ling (HKG)
Li Ying (CHN)	IPP
Tatýana Iwaşina (TKM)	IPP
Putri Rahayu (INA)

Bronze medals
Li Ying (CHN)	YUK
Inna Tsoi (KGZ)
Tatýana Iwaşina (TKM)
Kazue Nagai (JPN)	IPP
