= Varvara Massyagina =

Kazakh Olympic judoka (born 1977)

Personal information
- Full name: Varvara Gennadyevna Masyagina
- Born: 25 August 1977 (age 48) Almaty, Kazakh SSR, Soviet Union
- Occupation: Judoka
- Height: 1.69 m (5 ft 7 in)

Sport
- Country: Kazakhstan
- Sport: Judo
- Weight class: –78 kg
- Rank: 5th dan black belt

Achievements and titles
- Olympic Games: R32 (2004)
- World Champ.: R16 (1999)
- Asian Champ.: (silver) (1998, 2003)
Medal record
Women's judo
Representing Kazakhstan
Asian Games
Silver medal – second place	1998 Bangkok	–78 kg
Asian Championships
Silver medal – second place	2003 Jeju	–78 kg
Bronze medal – third place	2004 Almaty	–78 kg

Profile at external databases
- IJF: 34496
- JudoInside.com: 10045
- Updated on 13 March 2023

Varvara Gennadyevna Masyagina (Kazakh: Варвара Геннадьевна Масягина; born 25 August 1977 in Almaty) is a Kazakh judoka, who competed in the women's half-heavyweight category. She picked up five medals in her career, including two silvers each from the 1998 Asian Games in Bangkok, Thailand and the 2003 Asian Judo Championships in Jeju City, South Korea, and later represented her nation Kazakhstan at the 2004 Summer Olympics.

Massyagina qualified for the Kazakh squad in the women's half-heavyweight class (78 kg) at the 2004 Summer Olympics in Athens, by placing third and receiving a berth from the Asian Championships in Almaty. She lost her opening match to a seventeen-year-old U.S. judoka Nicole Kubes, who scored an ippon victory and quickly subdued her on the tatami with a harai makikomi (hip sweep wraparound) at eight seconds.
