= Kye Sun-hui =

North Korean judoka (born 1979)

Personal information
- Born: 2 August 1979 (age 47)
- Occupation: Judoka

Korean name
- Hangul: 계순희
- Hanja: 桂順姬
- RR: Gye Sunhui
- MR: Kye Sunhŭi

Sport
- Country: North Korea
- Sport: Judo
- Weight class: –48 kg, –52 kg, –57 kg

Achievements and titles
- Olympic Games: (gold) (1996)
- World Champ.: (gold) (2001, 2003, 2005, 2007)
- Asian Champ.: (gold) (1997, 1998, 1999)
Medal record
Women's judo
Representing North Korea
Olympic Games
Gold medal – first place	1996 Atlanta	‍–‍48 kg
Silver medal – second place	2004 Athens	‍–‍57 kg
Bronze medal – third place	2000 Sydney	‍–‍52 kg
World Championships
Gold medal – first place	2001 Munich	‍–‍52 kg
Gold medal – first place	2003 Osaka	‍–‍57 kg
Gold medal – first place	2005 Cairo	‍–‍57 kg
Gold medal – first place	2007 Rio de Janeiro	‍–‍57 kg
Silver medal – second place	1997 Paris	‍–‍52 kg
Bronze medal – third place	1999 Birmingham	‍–‍52 kg
Asian Games
Gold medal – first place	1998 Bangkok	‍–‍52 kg
Bronze medal – third place	2002 Busan	‍–‍52 kg
Asian Championships
Gold medal – first place	1997 Manila	‍–‍52 kg
Gold medal – first place	1999 Wenzhou	‍–‍52 kg

Profile at external databases
- IJF: 7991
- JudoInside.com: 1075
- Updated on 31 May 2023

Kye Sun-hui (Korean: 계순희; born 2 August 1979) is a North Korean judoka. Kye was born in Pyongyang.

== Career ==
Kye won three Olympic medals in different weight classes, in 1996, 2000 and 2004. When she won the gold medal in Atlanta, 1996 she became the youngest gold medalist in judo. She had entered the Games thanks to the wild card system, and her Olympic gold has been described as one of the biggest surprises of the Atlanta Olympics.

Kye competed for a fourth time at the 2008 Summer Olympics in Beijing but did not fare too well.

Kye has been awarded the Kim Il Sung Prize and the titles of People's Athlete and Labor Hero.
