= Nami Teshima =

Japanese judoka (born 1974)

Medal record

Women's Judo

Representing Japan

Asian Games
Silver medal – second place	1998 Bangkok	-63 kg

Nami Teshima (手島 奈美, Teshima Nami; born Nami Kimoto (木本 奈美, Kimoto Nami) on 31 March 1974) is a retired female Japanese judo wrestler.

Teshima was born in Hōfu, Yamaguchi, and began judo from 4th grade in elementary school. She entered the Sumitomo Marine & Fire Insurance after graduating from high school in 1993. She excelled at Osotogari, and also coached former world champion Gella Vandecaveye.

In 1997, Teshima participated in the World Judo Championships in Paris but was defeated by Cho Min-Sun in the first round. In 1998, she also participated in the Asian Games in Bangkok and won a silver medal. After that, she was regarded as one of the candidates of representative at Olympic Games in 2000 but was unable due to an anterior cruciate ligament injury. She retired in 2001, after the All-Japan Businessman Championships.

As of 2010, Teshima coaches judo at the Mitsui Sumitomo Insurance Group judo club, which she formerly belonged to.

== Achievements ==
- 1994 - Fukuoka International Women's Championships (-63 kg) 3rd

- All-Japan Women's Weight Class Championships (-66 kg) 1st
- All-Japan Businessgroup Championships (-66 kg) 1st

- 1996 - Fukuoka International Women's Championships (-63 kg) 3rd

- All-Japan Women's Weight Class Championships (-66 kg) 1st
- All-Japan Businessgroup Championships (-66 kg) 1st

- 1997 - World Championships (-66 kg) loss

- Fukuoka International Women's Championships (-63 kg) 1st
- All-Japan Selected Championships (-66 kg) 1st

- 1998 - Tournoi Super World Cup Paris (-63 kg) 1st
- 1999 - Fukuoka International Women's Championships (-63 kg) 1st

- Fukuoka International Women's Championships (-63 kg) 1st
- All-Japan Selected Championships (-63 kg) 3rd
- All-Japan Businessgroup Championships (-63 kg) 3rd

- 2000 - Fukuoka International Women's Championships (-63 kg) 2nd

- Tournoi Super World Cup Paris (-63 kg) 2nd
- All-Japan Selected Championships (-63 kg) 2nd
- All-Japan Women's Weight Class Championships (-63 kg) 1st
