= Sergey Shakimov =

Kazakhstani judoka (born 1972)

Personal information
- Nationality: Kazakhstani
- Born: 17 January 1972 (age 54) Astana, Kazakh SSR, Soviet Union

Sport
- Sport: Judo
Medal record
Representing Kazakhstan
Men's judo
Asian Games
Bronze medal – third place	1994 Hiroshima	–95 kg
East Asian Games
Bronze medal – third place	2001 Osaka	90 kg
Asian Championships
Gold medal – first place	1997 Manila	–95 kg
Gold medal – first place	1996 Ho Chi Minh	–95 kg
Gold medal – first place	1995 New Delhi	–95 kg
Bronze medal – third place	1993 Macao	–95 kg

Sergey Shakimov (born 17 January 1972) is a Kazakhstani judoka. He competed at the 1996 Summer Olympics and the 2000 Summer Olympics.
