= Xian Dongmei =

Chinese judoka (born 1975)

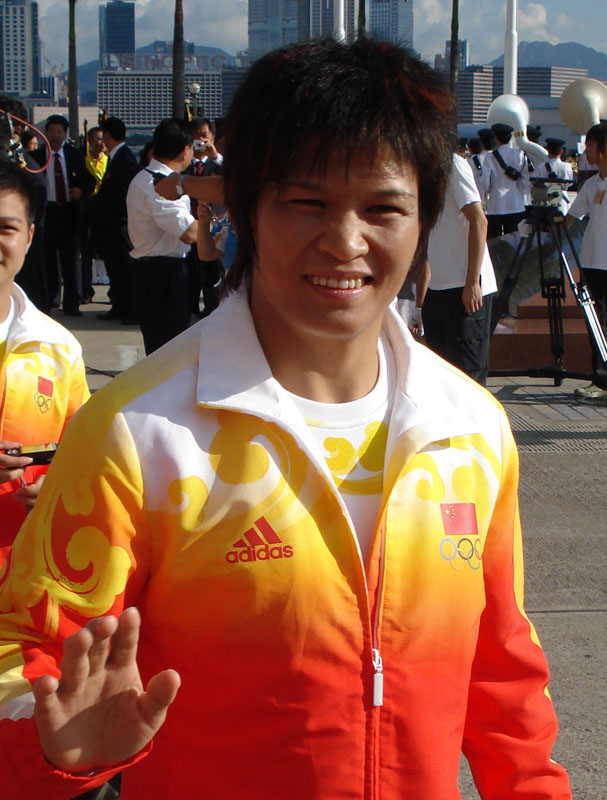

Personal information
- Born: 15 September 1975 (age 50)
- Occupation: Judoka

Sport
- Country: China
- Sport: Judo
- Weight class: –52 kg

Achievements and titles
- Olympic Games: (gold) (2004, 2008)
- Asian Champ.: (silver) (1995, 2002, 2004)
Medal record
Women's judo
Representing China
Olympic Games
Gold medal – first place	2004 Athens	‍–‍52 kg
Gold medal – first place	2008 Beijing	‍–‍52 kg
Asian Games
Silver medal – second place	2002 Busan	‍–‍52 kg
Asian Championships
Silver medal – second place	1995 New Delhi	‍–‍52 kg
Silver medal – second place	2004 Almaty	‍–‍52 kg
Bronze medal – third place	1993 Macau	‍–‍52 kg
Summer Universiade
Gold medal – first place	2001 Beijing	‍–‍52 kg

Profile at external databases
- IJF: 14900
- JudoInside.com: 932
- Updated on 30 May 2023

Xian Dongmei (simplified Chinese: 冼东妹; traditional Chinese: 冼東妹; pinyin: Xiǎn Dōngmèi; Jyutping: Sin2 Dung1 Mui6; born 15 September 1975 in Sihui, Zhaoqing, Guangdong) is a female Chinese judoka who competed in the 2004 Summer Olympics and the 2008 Summer Olympics.

A Hakka born in Sihui, she won the gold medal in the half-lightweight class in both the 2004 and 2008 Olympics.

Xian gave birth to a daughter only four months before beginning training for Beijing.
