= Masae Ueno =

Japanese judoka (born 1979)

Personal information
- Born: 17 January 1979 (age 47)
- Occupation: Judoka

Sport
- Country: Japan
- Sport: Judo
- Weight class: –70 kg

Achievements and titles
- Olympic Games: (gold) (2004, 2008)
- World Champ.: (gold) (2001, 2003)
- Asian Champ.: (gold) (2000, 2004, 2006, 2008)
Medal record
Women's judo
Representing Japan
Olympic Games
Gold medal – first place	2004 Athens	‍–‍70 kg
Gold medal – first place	2008 Beijing	‍–‍70 kg
World Championships
Gold medal – first place	2001 Munich	‍–‍70 kg
Gold medal – first place	2003 Osaka	‍–‍70 kg
Asian Games
Gold medal – first place	2006 Doha	‍–‍70 kg
Bronze medal – third place	2002 Busan	‍–‍70 kg
Asian Championships
Gold medal – first place	2000 Osaka	‍–‍70 kg
Gold medal – first place	2004 Almaty	‍–‍70 kg
Gold medal – first place	2008 Jeju	‍–‍70 kg

Profile at external databases
- IJF: 4246
- JudoInside.com: 7805
- Updated on 30 May 2023

Masae Ueno (上野 雅恵, Ueno Masae; born 17 January 1979) is a Japanese judoka who competed in the Athens 2004 Olympics and the Beijing 2008 Olympics. Ueno was born in Asahikawa Hokkaidō. In 2004, she earned Japan's fifth Olympic Gold Medal in ten events, winning the ‍–‍70 kg women's judo event. She also won the Olympic Gold Medal in 2008.

Ueno has two younger sisters who are also judokas. Yoshie Ueno became World champion in 2009 and Tomoe Ueno became World junior champion in 2006.
