= Ri Kyong-ok =

North Korean Olympic judoka

Personal information
- Full name: Ri Kyong-ok
- Nationality: North Korea
- Born: 3 January 1980 (age 46) Pyongyang, North Korea
- Height: 1.57 m (5 ft 2 in)
- Weight: 48 kg (106 lb)

Sport
- Sport: Judo
- Event: 48 kg

Korean name
- Hangul: 리경옥
- RR: Ri Gyeongok
- MR: Ri Kyŏngok
Medal record
Women's judo
Representing North Korea
World Championships
Silver medal – second place	2001 Munich	48 kg
Asian Games
Bronze medal – third place	2002 Busan	48 kg
Asian Championships
Gold medal – first place	2001 Ulaanbaatar	48 kg
Silver medal – second place	2004 Almaty	48 kg

Ri Kyong-ok (Korean: 리경옥; born January 3, 1980, in Pyongyang) is a North Korean judoka, who competed in the women's extra-lightweight category. She picked up four medals (one gold, two silvers, and one bronze) each in the 48-kg division at the 2001 World Judo Championships in Munich, Germany, 2002 Asian Games in Busan, South Korea, and Asian Championships (2001 and 2004), and represented her nation North Korea at the 2004 Summer Olympics.

Ri emerged herself in the international scene at the 2001 World Judo Championships in Munich, Germany, where she earned a silver medal in the 48-kg division, losing the final match to Japanese judoka and 2000 Olympic champion Ryoko Tani by a referee's decision. When her neighboring South Korea hosted the Asian Games in Busan the following year, Ri claimed an ippon victory over Kazakhstan's Tatyana Shishkina to share bronze medals with China's Shao Ran in the same division.

At the 2004 Summer Olympics in Athens, Ri qualified for the North Korean squad in the women's extra-lightweight class (48 kg), by placing second and receiving a berth from the Asian Championships in Almaty, Kazakhstan. She lost her opening match to Turkish judoka and two-time Olympian Neşe Şensoy Yıldız, who scored a single waza-ari point and threw her down the tatami with a harai makikomi (hip sweep wraparound) throughout the five-minute limit.
