= Judo at the 2002 Asian Games – Women's 52 kg =

Judo competition

Women's 52 kg at the 2002 Asian Games
- Venue: Gudeok Gymnasium
- Date: 2 October 2002
- Competitors: 13 from 13 nations

Medalists
gold medal	Lee Eun-hee	South Korea
silver medal	Xian Dongmei	China
bronze medal	Kye Sun-hui	North Korea
bronze medal	Sholpan Kaliyeva	Kazakhstan

The women's 52 kilograms (Half lightweight) competition at the 2002 Asian Games in Busan was held on 2 October at the Gudeok Gymnasium.

== Schedule ==
All times are Korea Standard Time (UTC+09:00)

Date	Time	Event
Wednesday, 2 October 2002	14:00	1 round
Wednesday, 2 October 2002	14:00	2 round
Wednesday, 2 October 2002	14:00	Repechage 1 round
Wednesday, 2 October 2002	14:00	Repechage 2 round
Wednesday, 2 October 2002	14:00	Semifinals
Wednesday, 2 October 2002	18:00	Finals

== Results ==
=== Main bracket ===
1 round
Xian Dongmei (CHN)	1000
Thái Mỹ Hương (VIE)	0000
Mönkhbaataryn Bundmaa (MGL)	0000
Kye Sun-hui (PRK)	1030
Tahmina Nazarmuhamedova (KGZ)	0000
Roongtawan Jindasing (THA)	0101
Lee Eun-hee (KOR)	1001
Mou Son Cheng (MAC)	0000
Yuki Yokosawa (JPN)	1000
Aye Aye Thin (MYA)	0000

2 round
Xian Dongmei (CHN)	0000
Kye Sun-hui (PRK)	0000
Shih Yu-shuang (TPE)	0120
Roongtawan Jindasing (THA)	0000
Sholpan Kaliyeva (KAZ)	0001
Lee Eun-hee (KOR)	0020
Hansakda Khouanpasa (LAO)	0000
Yuki Yokosawa (JPN)	1000

Semifinals
Xian Dongmei (CHN)	0110
Shih Yu-shuang (TPE)	0010
Lee Eun-hee (KOR)	0100
Yuki Yokosawa (JPN)	0020

Final
Xian Dongmei (CHN)	0000
Lee Eun-hee (KOR)	0020

=== Repechage ===
Repechage 1 round
Thái Mỹ Hương (VIE)	0000
Kye Sun-hui (PRK)	0210
Mou Son Cheng (MAC)	0000
Sholpan Kaliyeva (KAZ)	0200
Aye Aye Thin (MYA)	0010
Hansakda Khouanpasa (LAO)	0001

Repechage 2 round
Kye Sun-hui (PRK)	1010
Roongtawan Jindasing (THA)	0000
Sholpan Kaliyeva (KAZ)	0200
Aye Aye Thin (MYA)	0000

Bronze medal match
Kye Sun-hui (PRK)	0100
Yuki Yokosawa (JPN)	0010
Sholpan Kaliyeva (KAZ)	0010
Shih Yu-shuang (TPE)	0002
