= Khayrullo Nazriev =

Tajikistani judoka (born 1972)

Personal information
- Nationality: Tajikistani
- Born: 24 July 1972 (age 53)

Sport
- Sport: Judo
Medal record
Representing Tajikistan
Men's judo
Asian Games
Bronze medal – third place	1994 Hiroshima	–86 kg

Khayrullo Nazriev (born 24 July 1972) is a Tajikistani judoka. He competed in the men's half-heavyweight event at the 1996 Summer Olympics.
