= Kazue Nanjo =

Japanese judoka

Medal record

Women's Judo

Representing Japan

Asian Games
Bronze medal – third place	1998 Bangkok	-52 kg

Asian Championships
Silver medal – second place	1996 Ho Chi Minh City	-52 kg
Bronze medal – third place	1999 Wenzhou	-52 kg

East Asian Games
Gold medal – first place	1997 Busan	-52 kg

Kazue Nanjo (南條 和恵, Nanjō Kazue; née Nagai Nagai (永井); born 19 March 1972) is a retired Japanese judoka.

Nanjo was born in Uji, Kyoto, and began judo at the age of 5. She belonged to Daicolo Co., Ltd. after graduating from University of Tsukuba in 1995.

In 1997, she participated in the World Championships but was defeated by Carolina Mariani from Argentina. In 1998, she also participated in the Asian Games held in Bangkok and won a bronze medal.

Nanjo was good at Seoi nage, Tomoe nage and Newaza, learned by Shōzō Fujii at Tenri University. She was known as a rival of Noriko Narazaki who is a classmate of the same university and former world champion.

As of 2010, Nanjo coaches judo at Sendai University with her husband.

== Achievements ==
- 1989 - All-Japan High School Championships (-48 kg) 1st
- 1990 - All-Japan High School Championships (-48 kg) 1st
- 1991 - All-Japan Selected Championships (-48 kg) 3rd
- 1992 - All-Japan Selected Championships (-48 kg) 3rd
- 1993 - Fukuoka International Women's Championships (-52 kg) 2nd
- 1994 - All-Japan Selected Championships (-52 kg) 3rd

- All-Japan University Championships (-52 kg) 1st

- 1995 - All-Japan Businessgroup Championships (-52 kg) 1st
- 1996 - Asian Championships (-52 kg) 2nd

- Fukuoka International Women's Championships (-52 kg) 1st
- All-Japan Selected Championships (-52 kg) 2nd
- All-Japan Women's Weight Class Championships (-52 kg) 1st
- All-Japan Businessgroup Championships (-52 kg) 1st

- 1997 - East Asian Games (-52 kg) 1st

- Fukuoka International Women's Championships (-52 kg) 1st
- All-Japan Selected Championships (-52 kg) 1st

- 1998 - Asian Games (-52 kg) 3rd

- All-Japan Selected Championships (-52 kg) 1st

- 1999 - Asian Championships (-52 kg) 3rd

- Fukuoka International Women's Championships (-52 kg) 2nd
- Otto Super World cup Hamburg (-52 kg) 2nd
- All-Japan Selected Championships (-52 kg) 1st
- All-Japan Women's Weight Class Championships (-57 kg) loss

- 2000 - Aral Grand Prix Prague (-52 kg) loss

- All-Japan Women's Weight Class Championships (-52 kg) 5th

- 2001 - Pacific Rim Championships (-52 kg) 1st

- Aral Grand Prix Prague (-52 kg) 1st
- All-Japan Selected Championships (-52 kg) 3rd
