= Qin Dongya =

Chinese judoka (born 1978)

Personal information
- Born: 8 July 1978 (age 48)
- Occupation: Judoka

Sport
- Country: China
- Sport: Judo
- Weight class: –70 kg

Achievements and titles
- Olympic Games: (bronze) (2004)
- World Champ.: 5th (2003)
- Asian Champ.: (gold) (2002)
Medal record
Women's judo
Representing China
Olympic Games
Bronze medal – third place	2004 Athens	‍–‍70 kg
Asian Games
Gold medal – first place	2002 Busan	‍–‍70 kg
Bronze medal – third place	2006 Doha	‍–‍70 kg
Asian Championships
Silver medal – second place	1999 Wenzhou	‍–‍70 kg
Summer Universiade
Gold medal – first place	2001 Beijing	‍–‍70 kg

Profile at external databases
- IJF: 52972
- JudoInside.com: 7804
- Updated on 31 May 2023

Qin Dongya (simplified Chinese: 秦东亚; traditional Chinese: 秦東亞; pinyin: Qín Dōngyà; born 8 July 1978 in Liaoyang, Liaoning) is a female Chinese judoka who competed in the 2004 Summer Olympics and won a bronze medal in the middleweight (‍–‍70 kg) class.
