= Judo at the 2002 Asian Games – Men's +100 kg =

Judo competition

Men's +100 kg at the 2002 Asian Games
- Venue: Gudeok Gymnasium
- Date: 30 September 2002
- Competitors: 8 from 8 nations

Medalists
gold medal	Yasuyuki Muneta	Japan
silver medal	Mahmoud Miran	Iran
bronze medal	Kang Byung-jin	South Korea
bronze medal	Vyacheslav Berduta	Kazakhstan

The men's +100 kilograms (Heavyweight) competition at the 2002 Asian Games in Busan was held on 30 September at the Gudeok Gymnasium.

== Schedule ==
All times are Korea Standard Time (UTC+09:00)

Date	Time	Event
Monday, 30 September 2002	14:00	1 round
Monday, 30 September 2002	14:00	Repechage 1 round
Monday, 30 September 2002	14:00	Semifinals
Monday, 30 September 2002	18:00	Finals

== Results ==
=== Main bracket ===
1 round		Semifinals		Final
Abdullo Tangriev (UZB)	0200
Ochiryn Odgerel (MGL)	0010	Abdullo Tangriev (UZB)	0000
Majid Al-Ali (KUW)	0000	Yasuyuki Muneta (JPN)	1011
Yasuyuki Muneta (JPN)	0200			Yasuyuki Muneta (JPN)	1000
Mahmoud Miran (IRI)	1010			Mahmoud Miran (IRI)	0100
Vyacheslav Berduta (KAZ)	0010	Mahmoud Miran (IRI)	1000
Kang Byung-jin (KOR)	0111	Kang Byung-jin (KOR)	0000
Pan Song (CHN)	0100

=== Repechage ===
Repechage 1 round
Ochiryn Odgerel (MGL)	0001
Majid Al-Ali (KUW)	0001
Vyacheslav Berduta (KAZ)	0211
Pan Song (CHN)	0100

Bronze medal match
Majid Al-Ali (KUW)	0001
Kang Byung-jin (KOR)	1001
Vyacheslav Berduta (KAZ)	0011
Abdullo Tangriev (UZB)	0010
