= Lee Eun-hee (judoka) =

South Korean Olympic judoka

Personal information
- Full name: Lee Eun-hee
- Nationality: South Korea
- Born: 10 March 1979 (age 47) Seoul, South Korea
- Height: 1.65 m (5 ft 5 in)
- Weight: 52 kg (115 lb)

Sport
- Sport: Judo
- Event: 52 kg
Medal record
Women's judo
Representing South Korea
Asian Games
Gold medal – first place	2002 Busan	52 kg
Asian Championships
Gold medal – first place	2004 Almaty	52 kg
Bronze medal – third place	2007 Kuwait City	52 kg

Lee Eun-hee (also Lee Eun-hui, Korean: 이은희; born March 10, 1979) is a South Korean judoka, who competed in the women's half-lightweight category. She picked up a total of twelve medals in her career, including two golds each from the 2002 Asian Games in Busan and 2004 Asian Judo Championships in Almaty, Kazakhstan, and represented her nation South Korea in the 52-kg class at the 2004 Summer Olympics.

== Career ==
Lee first appeared in the international scene as part of the host nation's squad at the 2002 Asian Games in Busan, where she scored a double yuko point over China's Xian Dongmei for the gold medal in the 52-kg division.

At the 2004 Summer Olympics in Athens, Lee qualified for the South Korean squad in the women's half-lightweight class (52 kg), by topping the field and receiving a berth from the Asian Championships in Almaty, Kazakhstan. She lost her opening match to Cuba's Amarilis Savón, who successfully scored an ippon and quickly subdued her on the tatami with an o goshi (full hip throw) at one minute and twenty-four seconds. In the repechage, Lee gave herself a chance for an Olympic bronze medal, but slipped it away in a defeat to Sweden's Sanna Askelöf by an ippon victory and a kosoto gari (small outer reap) throw thirty-six seconds into their first round match.
