= Tang Lin =

Chinese judoka (born 1976)

Personal information
- Born: 7 May 1976 (age 50) Neijiang, China
- Occupation: Judoka

Sport
- Country: China
- Sport: Judo
- Weight class: ‍–‍72 kg, ‍–‍78 kg

Achievements and titles
- Olympic Games: (gold) (2000)
- Asian Champ.: (gold) (1998)
Medal record
Women's judo
Representing China
Olympic Games
Gold medal – first place	2000 Sydney	‍–‍78 kg
Asian Games
Gold medal – first place	1998 Bangkok	‍–‍78 kg
Asian Championships
Silver medal – second place	1996 Ho Chi Minh	‍–‍72 kg

Profile at external databases
- IJF: 53159
- JudoInside.com: 905
- Updated on 2 June 2023

Tang Lin (Chinese: 唐琳; pinyin: Táng Lín; born 7 May 1976) is a Chinese judoka and Olympic champion. She won the gold medal in the half heavyweight division at the 2000 Summer Olympics in Sydney.
