= Olesýa Nazarenko =

Turkmen judoka

Olesya Nazarenko (born 21 March 1976) is an amateur wrestler, judoka and sambo player from Turkmenistan. She participated in the 1996 Summer Olympics's Judo Women's 72 kg event. She was the first woman to represent Turkmenistan at the Olympics.

== Early life ==
Nazarenko was born on 21 March 1976 in Ashgabat, capital of Turkmenistan.

== Career ==
Nazarenko won bronze medals in 72 kg category at the 1995 and 1997 Asian Judo Championships. Two years later, she bagged a silver at the 1999 Asian Judo Championships (63kg) and another bronze in 70-kg event in 2001 Asian Judo Championships. At the 1996 Summer Olympics, Nazarenko competed in the Judo Women's 72 kg category and was eliminated in the Round of 16. In 1999, she won the World Sambo Championships held in Spain. She has also served as a sports coach at the National Institute of Sports and Tourism of Turkmenistan.

After moving to Russia in 2004, Nazarenko was a part of the Russian national teams in judo and sambo till 2009, competing in several national and international championships.

== Personal life ==
Nazarenko is married with one son and lives in Kotelniki, Moscow Oblast.
