= Kamol Muradov =

Uzbekistani judoka (born 1974)

Personal information
- Nationality: Uzbekistani
- Born: 29 November 1974 (age 50)
- Occupation: Judoka

Sport
- Sport: Judo

Profile at external databases
- JudoInside.com: 3181

Kamol Muradov (born 29 November 1974) is an Uzbekistani judoka. He competed at the 1996 Summer Olympics and the 2000 Summer Olympics.
