= Wu Mei-ling =

Taiwanese judoka (born 1973)

Personal information
- Full name: Chinese: 吳 玫玲; pinyin: Wú Méi-líng
- Nationality: Taiwanese
- Born: 6 January 1973 (age 53)

Sport
- Sport: Judo
Medal record
Representing Chinese Taipei
Asian Games
| Bronze medal – third place | 1994 Hiroshima | 66 kg |
| Bronze medal – third place | 1998 Bangkok | 63 kg |
Summer Universiade
| Bronze medal – third place | 1995 Fukuoka | 66 kg |

Wu Mei-ling (born 6 January 1973) is a Taiwanese judoka. She competed at the 1992 Summer Olympics and the 1996 Summer Olympics.
