= Kayo Kitada =

Japanese judoka (born 1978)

Medal record

Women's Judo

Representing Japan

Asian Games
| Gold medal – first place | 2002 Busan | -48 kg |

Asian Championships
| Gold medal – first place | 2004 Almaty | -48 kg |
| Silver medal – second place | 2003 Jeju | -48 kg |

Universiade
| Bronze medal – third place | 2001 Beijing | -48 kg |

Kayo Kitada (北田 佳世, Kitada Kayo; born 7 July 1978) is a retired Japanese judoka.

== Early life and education ==
Kitada was born in Shirahama, Wakayama and began judo at the age of 10. She graduated from Nippon Sport Science University in 2001.

== Career ==
In 2002, she participated in the Asian Games held in Busan and won a gold medal in the Extra Lightweight category.

Kitada also won a gold medal at Paris Super World Cup, Otto World Cup Hamburg and other international championships but did not participate in the Olympic Games or World Championships mainly due to 7 times world champion Ryoko Tamura.

In 2005, Kitada finally participated in the World Championships but was defeated by Yanet Bermoy from Cuba and Alina Alexandra Dumitru from Romania. In April 2006, Kitada retired.

As of 2010, Kitada coaches judo at the Yoshida Dojo. and Shutoku High School.
