= Yeh Wen-hua =

Taiwanese judoka (born 1976)

Personal information
- Nationality: Taiwanese
- Born: 20 February 1976 (age 49)

Sport
- Sport: Judo

Yeh Wen-hua (born 20 February 1976) is a Taiwanese judoka. She competed in the women's heavyweight event at the 1996 Summer Olympics.
