= Chen Chiu-ping =

Taiwanese judoka (born 1974)

Personal information
- Nationality: Taiwanese
- Born: 19 October 1974 (age 51)

Sport
- Sport: Judo
Medal record
Representing Chinese Taipei
Asian Games
Bronze medal – third place	1994 Hiroshima	72 kg
Bronze medal – third place	1998 Bangkok	70 kg

Chen Chiu-ping (born 19 October 1974) is a Taiwanese judoka. She competed in the women's half-heavyweight event at the 1996 Summer Olympics.
