= Bae Eun-hye =

South Korean judoka

- Born: August 21, 1982 (age 42); South Korea
- Height: 1.7 m (5 ft 7 in)
- Weight: 68 kg (150 lb; 10 st 10 lb)
- Division: 70 kg
- Style: Judo

- Bae Eun-hye
- Hangul: 배은혜
- Hanja: 裵恩惠
- RR: Bae Eunhye
- MR: Pae Ŭnhye

Bae Eun-hye (Korean: 배은혜; born August 21, 1982) was a member of the South Korean judo team and a silver medalist in the 2006 Doha Asian Games for the women's 70 kg judo event.
