= Nasiba Surkiýewa =

Turkmenistani Olympic judoka

Nasiba Surkiyeva
Personal information
- Full name: Nasiba Salayeva-Surkiyeva; Nasiba Salaeva-Surkieva
- Nationality: Turkmenistan
- Born: 11 January 1982 (age 44)
- Occupation: Judoka
- Height: 1.65 m (5 ft 5 in)
- Weight: 72 kg (159 lb)

Sport
- Sport: Judo
- Event: 70 kg

Profile at external databases
- JudoInside.com: 11877

Nasiba Salayeva-Surkiyeva (also spelled Salaeva-Surkieva; born 11 January 1982) is a Turkmenistan judoka, who competed in the middleweight and half-heavyweight categories. Surkieva made her official debut for the 2000 Summer Olympics in Sydney, where she competed in the women's 78 kg class. She lost the first preliminary match to China's Tang Lin, who eventually won the gold medal in the finals. She offered another shot for the bronze medal through the repechage bouts, where she was defeated by Mongolia's Rambuugiin Dashdulam in the first round.

At the 2004 Summer Olympics in Athens, Surkieva switched to a lighter class by competing in the women's middleweight division, despite that she weighed 72 kilograms. She lost again in her first preliminary match by a more formidable opponent, two-time medalist and four-time Olympian Kate Howey of Great Britain, who scored an automatic ippon at three minutes and twenty-three seconds.

At the 2008 Summer Olympics in Beijing, Surkieva competed for the second time in the women's 70 kg class. She received a bye for the second preliminary match, before losing out to Ronda Rousey of the United States, who eventually won the bronze medal in this division.

In 2014 Asian Beach Games won silver medal.
