= Judo at the 2004 Summer Olympics – Qualification =

Qualification for judo at the Games of the XXVIII Olympiad

Qualification for Judo at the 2004 Summer Olympics was based on the IJF 2003 World Judo Championships in September 2003. The top 6 men and women from each division qualify, subject to a limit of 1 judoka per National Olympic Committee ("NOC") per division. Further continental quotas (Europe 98, Africa 35, Pan-America 63, Asia 56 and Oceania 14 across both sexes and all divisions) also qualify subject to an overall limit of 1 judoka per NOC. The qualification is allocated to the athlete.

== Qualification timeline ==
List of tournaments
Africa
Event	Date	Venue	Even Ref.
2002 African Judo Championships	October 4–7, 2002	(Egypt) Cairo	
2003 All-Africa Games	October 15–18, 2003	(Nigeria) Abuja	
2004 African Judo Championships	May 7–8, 2004	(Tunisia) Tunis	
2003 AJU International Tournament	March 28–29, 2003	(Tunisia) Tunis	
2004 AJU International Tournament	June 25–26, 2004	(Tunisia) Tunis	
2003 AJU International Tournament	April 26–27, 2003	(Cameroon) Yaoundé	
2003 AJU International Tournament	April 10–11, 2004	(Cameroon) Yaoundé	
2003 AJU International Tournament	June 23–24, 2003	(Ivory Coast) Abidjan	
2003 AJU International Tournament	April 16–18, 2004	(Ivory Coast) Abidjan	
AJU International Tournament		(Madagascar) Antananarivo	
2003 AJU International Tournament	May 22–26, 2003	(Mauritius) Saint-Denis	
2004 AJU International Tournament	March 13, 2004	(Mauritius) Saint-Denis	
2003 AJU International Tournament	April 19–20, 2003	(Morocco) Casablanca	
2004 AJU International Tournament	March 28, 2004	(Morocco) Casablanca	
2003 Super A-Tournament	February 8–9, 2003	(France) Paris	
2004 Super A-Tournament	February 7–8, 2004	(France) Paris	
2003 A-Tournament Women	February 15–16, 2003	(Austria) Leonding	
2004 A-Tournament Women	2004	(Austria) Leonding	
2003 A-Tournament Men	March 22–23, 2003	(Italy) Rome	
2004 A-Tournament Women	March 20–21, 2004	(Italy) Rome	
2003 Super A-Tournament	February 22–23, 2003	(Germany) Hamburg	
2004 Super A-Tournament	February 21–22, 2004	(Germany) Hamburg	
Asia
Event	Date	Venue	Even Ref.
2002 Asian Games	September 30– October 3, 2002	(South Korea) Busan	
2002 Women's International Tournament	December 7–8, 2002	(Japan) Fukuoka	
2002 KRA Open	December 14–15, 2002	(South Korea) Seoul	
2003 Kano Cup	January 11–12, 2003	(Japan) Tokyo	
2003 Super A-Tournament	January 23–24, 2003	(Russia) Moscow	
2003 Super A-Tournament	February 8–9, 2003	(France) Paris	
2003 Super A-Tournament	February 22–23, 2003	(Germany) Hamburg	
2003 World Judo Championships	September 11–14, 2003	(Japan) Osaka	
2003 Asian Judo Championships	October 31 - November 1, 2003	(South Korea) Jeju City	
2003 Women's International Tournament	December 13, 2003	(Japan) Fukuoka	
2003 KRA Open	December 6–7, 2003	(South Korea) Seoul	
~~2004 Kano Cup~~	~~January, 2004~~	~~(Japan) Tokyo~~	(Note: 2004 Kano Cup did not happen)
2004 Super A-Tournament	January 24–25, 2004	(Russia) Moscow	
2004 Super A-Tournament	February 7–8, 2004	(France) Paris	
2004 Super A-Tournament	February 21–22, 2004	(Germany) Hamburg	
2004 Asian Judo Championships	May 15–16, 2004	(Kazakhstan) Almaty	
Europe
Event	Date	Venue	Even Ref.
2003 Super A-Tournament	January 23–24, 2003	(Russia) Moscow	
2003 A-Tournament Men	February 1–2, 2003	(Georgia (country)) Tbilisi	
2003 A-Tournament Women	February 1–2, 2003	(Bulgaria) Sofia	
2003 Super A-Tournament	February 8–9, 2003	(France) Paris	
2003 A-Tournament Men	February 15–16, 2003	(Hungary) Budapest	
2003 A-Tournament Women	February 15–16, 2003	(Austria) Leonding	
2003 Super A-Tournament	February 22–23, 2003	(Germany) Hamburg	
2003 A-Tournament Men	March 15–16, 2003	(Poland) Warsaw	
2003 A-Tournament Women	March 15–16, 2003	(Czech Republic) Prague	
2003 A-Tournament Men	March 22–23, 2003	(Italy) Rome	
2003 A-Tournament Women	March 22–23, 2003	(Netherlands) Rotterdam	
2003 A-Tournament Men	March 29–30, 2003	(Estonia) Tallinn	
2003 A-Tournament Women	March 29–30, 2003	(Belarus) Minsk	
2003 European Judo Championships	May 16–18, 2004	(Germany) Düsseldorf	
2004 Super A-Tournament	January 24–25, 2004	(Russia) Moscow	
2004 A-Tournament Men	2004	(Georgia (country)) Tbilisi	
2004 A-Tournament Women	2004	(Bulgaria) Sofia	
2004 Super A-Tournament	February 7–8, 2004	(France) Paris	
2004 A-Tournament Men	2004	(Hungary) Budapest	
2004 A-Tournament Women	2004	(Austria) Leonding	
2004 Super A-Tournament	February 21–22, 2004	(Germany) Hamburg	
2004 A-Tournament Men	March 13–14, 2004	(Czech Republic) Prague	
2004 A-Tournament Women	March 13–14, 2004	(Poland) Warsaw	
2004 A-Tournament Men	March 20–21, 2004	(Netherlands) Rotterdam	
2004 A-Tournament Women	March 20–21, 2004	(Italy) Rome	
2004 A-Tournament Men	March 27–28, 2004	(Belarus) Minsk	
2004 A-Tournament Women	March 27–28, 2004	(Estonia) Tallinn	
2004 European Judo Championships	May 14–16, 2004	(Romania) Bucharest	
Oceania
Event	Date	Venue	Even Ref.
2003 World Judo Championships	September 11–14, 2003	(Japan) Osaka	
2003 US International Invitational Open	October 11–12, 2003	(United States) Las Vegas	
2004 Oceania Judo Championships	April 17–18, 2004	(France) Nouméa	
Pan America
Event	Date	Venue	Even Ref.
2002 Pan American Judo Championships	November, 2002	(Dominican Republic) Santo Domingo	
Zone II (Note: Zone II Countries: Netherlands Antilles, Aruba, Barbados, Colombia, Costa Rica, El Salvador, Grenada, Guatemala, Honduras, Nicaragua, Puerto Rico, Panama, Venezuela) Qualification Tournament	May 1–3, 2003	(Venezuela) Margarita Island	
Zone I (Note: Zone I Countries: Bahamas, Belize, Bermudas, British Virgin Islands, Canada, Cayman Islands, Cuba, Dominican Republic, Haiti, Jamaica, Mexico, St Lucia, United States of America, United States Virgin Islands) Qualification Tournament	May 25, 2003	Mexico City	
2003 Pan American Judo Championships	June 5–6, 2003	(Brazil) Salvador	
2003 Pan American Games	August 9–12, 2003	(Dominican Republic) Santo Domingo	
2003 World Judo Championships	September 11–14, 2003	(Japan) Osaka	
Zone III (Note: Zone III Countries: Argentina, Bolivia, Brazil, Chile, Dominica, Ecuador, Guyana, Paraguay, Peru, St. Vincent and the Grenadines, Suriname, Trinidad and Tobago, Uruguay) Qualification Tournament	October 9–12, 2003	(Argentina) Buenos Aires	
2004 Pan American Judo Championships	April 19–24, 2004	(Venezuela) Margarita Island	

== Men's events ==
=== Extra-lightweight (60 kg) ===
Qualification method		Places	Rank	NOC	Qualified judoka	Ranking points	Qualified* (not highest ranked in NOC)
World Championship		6	1		Choi Min-Ho (KOR)		
World Championship		6	2		Craig Fallon (GBR)		
World Championship		6	3		Tadahiro Nomura (JPN)		
World Championship		6	3		Anis Lounifi (TUN)		
World Championship		6	5		Oliver Gussenberg (GER)		
World Championship		6	5		Pak Nam-Choi (PRK)		
Continental quota	Africa	3	1				
Continental quota	Africa	3	2				
Continental quota	Africa	3	3				
Continental quota	Asia	5	1				
Continental quota	Asia	5	2				
Continental quota	Asia	5	3				
Continental quota	Asia	5	4				
Continental quota	Asia	5	5				
Continental quota	Europe	9	1				
Continental quota	Europe	9	2				
Continental quota	Europe	9	3				
Continental quota	Europe	9	4				
Continental quota	Europe	9	5				
Continental quota	Europe	9	6				
Continental quota	Europe	9	7				
Continental quota	Europe	9	8				
Continental quota	Europe	9	9				
Continental quota	Oceania	1	1	Australia	Scott Fernandis		
Continental quota	America	6	1				
Continental quota	America	6	2				
Continental quota	America	6	3				
Continental quota	America	6	4				
Continental quota	America	6	5				
Continental quota	America	6	6				
Invitations	Host nation	1	—	Greece	Revazi Zintiridis		
Invitations	I.O.C./.I.J.F./ ANOC		—				

=== Half-lightweight (66 kg) ===
Qualification method		Places	Rank	NOC	Qualified judoka	Ranking points	Qualified* (not highest ranked in NOC)
World Championship		6	1		Arash Miresmaeili (IRI)		
World Championship		6	2		Larbi Benboudaoud (FRA)		
World Championship		6	3		Yordanis Arencibia (CUB)		
World Championship		6	3		Magomed Dzhafarov (RUS)		
World Championship		6	5		João Pina (POR)		
World Championship		6	5		Miloš Mijalković (SCG)		
Continental quota	Africa	3	1				
Continental quota	Africa	3	2				
Continental quota	Africa	3	3				
Continental quota	Asia	5	1				
Continental quota	Asia	5	2				
Continental quota	Asia	5	3				
Continental quota	Asia	5	4				
Continental quota	Asia	5	5				
Continental quota	Europe	9	1				
Continental quota	Europe	9	2				
Continental quota	Europe	9	3				
Continental quota	Europe	9	4				
Continental quota	Europe	9	5				
Continental quota	Europe	9	6				
Continental quota	Europe	9	7				
Continental quota	Europe	9	8				
Continental quota	Europe	9	9				
Continental quota	Oceania	1	1	Australia	Heath Young		
Continental quota	America	6	1				
Continental quota	America	6	2				
Continental quota	America	6	3				
Continental quota	America	6	4				
Continental quota	America	6	5				
Continental quota	America	6	6				
Invitations	Host nation	1	—	Greece	Giorgi Vazagashvili		
Invitations	I.O.C./.I.J.F./ ANOC		—	BOL	Juan José Paz		

=== Lightweight (73 kg) ===
Qualification method		Places	Rank	NOC	Qualified judoka	Ranking points	Qualified* (not highest ranked in NOC)
World Championship		6	1		Lee Won-Hee (KOR)		
World Championship		6	2		Daniel Fernandes (FRA)		
World Championship		6	3		João Neto (POR)		
World Championship		6	3		Vitaliy Makarov (RUS)		
World Championship		6	5		Victor Bivol (MDA)		
World Championship		6	5		Egamnazar Akbarov (UZB)		
Continental quota	Africa	3	1				
Continental quota	Africa	3	2				
Continental quota	Africa	3	3				
Continental quota	Asia	5	1				
Continental quota	Asia	5	2				
Continental quota	Asia	5	3				
Continental quota	Asia	5	4				
Continental quota	Asia	5	5				
Continental quota	Europe	9	1				
Continental quota	Europe	9	2				
Continental quota	Europe	9	3				
Continental quota	Europe	9	4				
Continental quota	Europe	9	5				
Continental quota	Europe	9	6				
Continental quota	Europe	9	7				
Continental quota	Europe	9	8				
Continental quota	Europe	9	9				
Continental quota	Oceania	1	1	Australia	Andrew Collett		
Continental quota	America	6	1				
Continental quota	America	6	2				
Continental quota	America	6	3				
Continental quota	America	6	4				
Continental quota	America	6	5				
Continental quota	America	6	6				
Invitations	Host nation	1	—	Greece	Lavrentios Alexanidis		
Invitations	I.O.C./.I.J.F./ ANOC		—	CYP	Christodoulos Christodoulides		
Invitations	I.O.C./.I.J.F./ ANOC		—	MLI	Bourama Mariko		
Invitations	I.O.C./.I.J.F./ ANOC		—	TGA	Akapei Latu		

=== Half-middleweight (81 kg) ===
Qualification method		Places	Rank	NOC	Qualified judoka	Ranking points	Qualified* (not highest ranked in NOC)
World Championship		6	1		Florian Wanner (GER)		
World Championship		6	2		Sergei Aschwanden (SUI)		
World Championship		6	3		Robert Krawczyk (POL)		
World Championship		6	3		Aleksei Budõlin (EST)		
World Championship		6	5		Yoshihiro Akiyama (JPN)		
World Championship		6	5		Ricardo Echarte (ESP)		
Continental quota	Africa	3	1				
Continental quota	Africa	3	2				
Continental quota	Africa	3	3				
Continental quota	Asia	5	1				
Continental quota	Asia	5	2				
Continental quota	Asia	5	3				
Continental quota	Asia	5	4				
Continental quota	Asia	5	5				
Continental quota	Europe	9	1				
Continental quota	Europe	9	2				
Continental quota	Europe	9	3				
Continental quota	Europe	9	4				
Continental quota	Europe	9	5				
Continental quota	Europe	9	6				
Continental quota	Europe	9	7				
Continental quota	Europe	9	8				
Continental quota	Europe	9	9				
Continental quota	Oceania	1	1	Australia	Morgan Endicott-Davies		
Continental quota	America	6	1				
Continental quota	America	6	2				
Continental quota	America	6	3				
Continental quota	America	6	4				
Continental quota	America	6	5				
Continental quota	America	6	6				
Invitations	Host nation	1	—	Greece	Ilias Iliadis		
Invitations	I.O.C./.I.J.F./ ANOC		—	LBA	Mohamed Ben Saleh		

=== Middleweight (90 kg) ===
Qualification method		Places	Rank	NOC	Qualified judoka	Ranking points	Qualified* (not highest ranked in NOC)
World Championship		6	1		Hwang Hee-Tae (KOR)		
World Championship		6	2		Zurab Zviadauri (GEO)		
World Championship		6	3		Siarhei Kukharenka (BLR)		
World Championship		6	3		Carlos Honorato (BRA)		
World Championship		6	5		Yosvany Despaigne (CUB)		
World Championship		6	5		Keith Morgan (CAN)		
Continental quota	Africa	3	1				
Continental quota	Africa	3	2				
Continental quota	Africa	3	3				
Continental quota	Asia	5	1				
Continental quota	Asia	5	2				
Continental quota	Asia	5	3				
Continental quota	Asia	5	4				
Continental quota	Asia	5	5				
Continental quota	Europe	9	1				
Continental quota	Europe	9	2				
Continental quota	Europe	9	3				
Continental quota	Europe	9	4				
Continental quota	Europe	9	5				
Continental quota	Europe	9	6				
Continental quota	Europe	9	7				
Continental quota	Europe	9	8				
Continental quota	Europe	9	9				
Continental quota	Oceania	1	1	Australia	Daniel Kelly		
Continental quota	America	6	1				
Continental quota	America	6	2				
Continental quota	America	6	3				
Continental quota	America	6	4				
Continental quota	America	6	5				
Continental quota	America	6	6				
Invitations	Host nation	1	—	Greece	Dionysios Iliadis		
Invitations	I.O.C./.I.J.F./ ANOC		—	AND	Toni Besolí		

=== Half-heavyweight (100 kg) ===
Qualification method		Places	Rank	NOC	Qualified judoka	Ranking points	Qualified* (not highest ranked in NOC)
World Championship		6	1		Kosei Inoue (JPN)		
World Championship		6	2		Ghislain Lemaire (FRA)		
World Championship		6	3		Ihar Makarau (BLR)		
World Championship		6	3		Mário Sabino (BRA)		
World Championship		6	5		Michele Monti (ITA)		
World Championship		6	5		Nicolas Gill (CAN)		
Continental quota	Africa	3	1				
Continental quota	Africa	3	2				
Continental quota	Africa	3	3				
Continental quota	Asia	5	1				
Continental quota	Asia	5	2				
Continental quota	Asia	5	3				
Continental quota	Asia	5	4				
Continental quota	Asia	5	5				
Continental quota	Europe	9	1				
Continental quota	Europe	9	2				
Continental quota	Europe	9	3				
Continental quota	Europe	9	4				
Continental quota	Europe	9	5				
Continental quota	Europe	9	6				
Continental quota	Europe	9	7				
Continental quota	Europe	9	8				
Continental quota	Europe	9	9				
Continental quota	Oceania	1	1	Australia	Martin Kelly		
Continental quota	America	6	1				
Continental quota	America	6	2				
Continental quota	America	6	3				
Continental quota	America	6	4				
Continental quota	America	6	5				
Continental quota	America	6	6				
Invitations	Host nation	1	—	Greece	Vassilios Iliadis		
Invitations	I.O.C./.I.J.F./ ANOC		—	BIH	Amel Mekić		
Invitations	I.O.C./.I.J.F./ ANOC		—	FIN	Timo Peltola		

=== Heavyweight (+100 kg) ===
Qualification method		Places	Rank	NOC	Qualified judoka	Ranking points	Qualified* (not highest ranked in NOC)
World Championship		6	1		Yasuyuki Muneta (JPN)		
World Championship		6	2		Dennis van der Geest (NED)		
World Championship		6	3		Tamerlan Tmenov (RUS)		
World Championship		6	3		Yevgen Sotnikov (UKR)		
World Championship		6	5		Daniel Hernandes (BRA)		
World Championship		6	5		Frank Möller (GER)		
Continental quota	Africa	3	1				
Continental quota	Africa	3	2				
Continental quota	Africa	3	3				
Continental quota	Asia	5	1				
Continental quota	Asia	5	2				
Continental quota	Asia	5	3				
Continental quota	Asia	5	4				
Continental quota	Asia	5	5				
Continental quota	Europe	9	1				
Continental quota	Europe	9	2				
Continental quota	Europe	9	3				
Continental quota	Europe	9	4				
Continental quota	Europe	9	5				
Continental quota	Europe	9	6				
Continental quota	Europe	9	7				
Continental quota	Europe	9	8				
Continental quota	Europe	9	9				
Continental quota	Oceania	1	1	Australia	Semir Pepic		
Continental quota	America	6	1				
Continental quota	America	6	2				
Continental quota	America	6	3				
Continental quota	America	6	4				
Continental quota	America	6	5				
Continental quota	America	6	6				
Invitations	Host nation	1	—	Greece	Charalampos Papaioannou		
Invitations	I.O.C./.I.J.F./ ANOC		—	IRQ	Hadir Lazame		
Invitations	I.O.C./.I.J.F./ ANOC		—	KUW	Majid Al-Ali		

== Women's events ==
=== Extra-lightweight (48 kg) ===
Qualification method		Places	Rank	NOC	Qualified judoka	Ranking points	Qualified* (not highest ranked in NOC)
World Championship		6	1		Ryoko Tamura (JPN)		
World Championship		6	2		Frédérique Jossinet (FRA)		
World Championship		6	3		Neşe Şensoy (TUR)		
World Championship		6	3	Cuba	Danieska Carrión (CUB)		
World Championship		6	5		Julia Matijass (GER)		
World Championship		6	5		Gao Feng (CHN)		
Continental quota	Africa	2		Algeria	Soraya Haddad		
Continental quota	Africa	2		Central African Republic	Bertille Ali		
Continental quota	Asia	3	1				
Continental quota	Asia	3	2				
Continental quota	Asia	3	3				
Continental quota	Europe	5	1				
Continental quota	Europe	5	2				
Continental quota	Europe	5	3				
Continental quota	Europe	5	4				
Continental quota	Europe	5	5				
Continental quota	Oceania	1	1	Australia	Sonya Chervonsky		
Continental quota	America	3	1	Colombia	Lisseth Orozco	54	
Continental quota	America	3	2	Canada	Carolyne Lepage	53	
Continental quota	America	3	3	Brazil	Daniela Polzin	47	
Invitations	Host nation	1	—	Greece	Maria Karagiannopoulou		
Invitations	I.O.C./.I.J.F./ ANOC		—	CAF	Bertille Ali		

=== Half-lightweight (52 kg) ===
Qualification method		Places	Rank	NOC	Qualified judoka	Ranking points	Qualified* (not highest ranked in NOC)
World Championship		6	1	Cuba	Amarilis Savón (CUB)		
World Championship		6	2		Annabelle Euranie (FRA)		
World Championship		6	3		Raffaella Imbriani (GER)		
World Championship		6	3		Yuki Yokosawa (JPN)		
World Championship		6	5		Ri Sang-Rim (PRK)		
World Championship		6	5		Georgina Singleton (GBR)		
Continental quota	Africa	2		Algeria	Salima Souakri		
Continental quota	Africa	2		Senegal	Hortense Diédhiou		
Continental quota	Asia	3	1				
Continental quota	Asia	3	2				
Continental quota	Asia	3	3				
Continental quota	Europe	5	1				
Continental quota	Europe	5	2				
Continental quota	Europe	5	3				
Continental quota	Europe	5	4				
Continental quota	Europe	5	5				
Continental quota	Oceania	1	1	New Zealand	Rochelle Stormont		
Continental quota	America	3	1	United States	Charlee Minkin	56	
Continental quota	America	3	2	Venezuela	Flor Velázquez	47	
Continental quota	America	3	3	Brazil	Fabiane Hukuda	29	
Invitations	Host nation	1	—	Greece	Maria Tselaridou		
Invitations	I.O.C./.I.J.F./ ANOC		—	Guinea	M'mah Soumah		
Invitations	I.O.C./.I.J.F./ ANOC		—	SWE	Sanna Askelöf		

=== Lightweight (57 kg) ===
Qualification method		Places	Rank	NOC	Qualified judoka	Ranking points	Qualified* (not highest ranked in NOC)
World Championship		6	1		Kye Sun-hui (PRK)		
World Championship		6	2		Yvonne Bönisch (GER)		
World Championship		6	3	Cuba	Yurisleidis Lupetey (CUB)		
World Championship		6	3		Deborah Gravenstijn (NED)		
World Championship		6	5	Australia	Maria Pekli		
World Championship		6	5		Barbara Harel (FRA)		
Continental quota	Africa	2		Algeria	Lila Latrous		
Continental quota	Africa	2		Nigeria	Catherine Ekuta		
Continental quota	Asia	3	1				
Continental quota	Asia	3	2				
Continental quota	Asia	3	3				
Continental quota	Europe	5	1				
Continental quota	Europe	5	2				
Continental quota	Europe	5	3				
Continental quota	Europe	5	4				
Continental quota	Europe	5	5				
Continental quota	Oceania	1	1	Fiji	Elina Nasaudrodro		
Continental quota	America	3	1	Brazil	Danielle Zangrando	23	
Continental quota	America	3	2	United States	Ellen Wilson	45	
Continental quota	America	3	3	Puerto Rico	Jessica García	40	
Invitations	Host nation	1	—	Greece	Ioulietta Boukouvala		
Invitations	I.O.C./.I.J.F./ ANOC		—	MLT	Marcon Bezzina		

=== Half-middleweight (63 kg) ===
Qualification method		Places	Rank	NOC	Qualified judoka	Ranking points	Qualified* (not highest ranked in NOC)
World Championship		6	1	Argentina	Daniela Krukower (ARG)		
World Championship		6	2	Cuba	Driulis González (CUB)		
World Championship		6	3		Anna von Harnier (GER)		
World Championship		6	3		Ylenia Scapin (ITA)		
World Championship		6	5		Lee Bok-Hee (KOR)		
World Championship		6	5	Brazil	Vânia Ishii		
Continental quota	Africa	2		South Africa	Henriette Moller		
Continental quota	Africa	2		Tunisia	Saida Dhahri		
Continental quota	Asia	3	1				
Continental quota	Asia	3	2				
Continental quota	Asia	3	3				
Continental quota	Europe	5	1				
Continental quota	Europe	5	2				
Continental quota	Europe	5	3				
Continental quota	Europe	5	4				
Continental quota	Europe	5	5				
Continental quota	Oceania	1	1	Australia	Carly Dixon		
Continental quota	America	3	1	Canada	Marie-Hélène Chisholm	30	
Continental quota	America	3	2	United States	Ronda Rousey	12	
Continental quota	America	3	3	Ecuador	Diana Maza	36	
Invitations	Host nation	1	—	Greece	Eleni Tampasi		
Invitations	I.O.C./.I.J.F./ ANOC		—				

=== Middleweight (70 kg) ===
Catherine Arlove		Places	Rank	NOC	Qualified judoka	Ranking points	Qualified* (not highest ranked in NOC)
World Championship		6	1		Masae Ueno (JPN)		
World Championship		6	2	Cuba	Regla Leyén (CUB)		
World Championship		6	3		Edith Bosch (NED)		
World Championship		6	3		Annett Böhm (GER)		
World Championship		6	5		Qin Dongya (CHN)		
World Championship		6	5		Kate Howey (GBR)		
Continental quota	Africa	2	1				
Continental quota	Africa	2	2				
Continental quota	Asia	3	1				
Continental quota	Asia	3	2				
Continental quota	Asia	3	3				
Continental quota	Europe	5	1				
Continental quota	Europe	5	2				
Continental quota	Europe	5	3				
Continental quota	Europe	5	4				
Continental quota	Europe	5	5				
Continental quota	Oceania	1	1	Australia	Catherine Marie Joelle Arlove		
Continental quota	America	3	1	Canada	Catherine Roberge	?	
Continental quota	America	3	2	Argentina	Elizabeth Copes	47	
Continental quota	America	3	3	United States	Celita Schutz	?	
Invitations	Host nation	1	—	Greece	Alexia Kourtelesi		
Invitations	I.O.C./.I.J.F./ ANOC		—	AFG	Friba Razayee		

=== Half-heavyweight (78 kg) ===
Qualification method		Places	Rank	NOC	Qualified judoka	Ranking points	Qualified* (not highest ranked in NOC)
World Championship		6	1		Noriko Anno (JPN)		
World Championship		6	2	Cuba	Yurisel Laborde (CUB)		
World Championship		6	3	Brazil	Edinanci Silva (BRA)		
World Championship		6	3		Esther San Miguel (ESP)		
World Championship		6	5		Claudia Zwiers (NED)		
World Championship		6	5		Céline Lebrun (FRA)		
Continental quota	Africa	2	1				
Continental quota	Africa	2	2				
Continental quota	Asia	3	1				
Continental quota	Asia	3	2				
Continental quota	Asia	3	3				
Continental quota	Europe	5	1				
Continental quota	Europe	5	2				
Continental quota	Europe	5	3				
Continental quota	Europe	5	4				
Continental quota	Europe	5	5				
Continental quota	Oceania	1	1	Fiji	Sisilia Rasokisoki		
Continental quota	America	3	1	Venezuela	Keivi Pinto	44	
Continental quota	America	3	2	Canada	Amy Cotton	35	
Continental quota	America	3	3	United States	Nicole Kubes	?	
Invitations	Host nation	1	—	Greece	Varvara Akritidou		
Invitations	I.O.C./.I.J.F./ ANOC		—				

=== Heavyweight (+78 kg) ===
Qualification method		Places	Rank	NOC	Qualified judoka	Ranking points	Qualified* (not highest ranked in NOC)
World Championship		6	1	China	Liu Xia		
World Championship		6	2	Japan	Noriko Anno		
World Championship		6	3	Russia	Vera Moskalyuk		
World Championship		6	3	Great Britain	Rachel Wilding		
World Championship		6	5	Germany	Uta Kühnen		
World Championship		6	5	Cuba	Yurisel Laborde		
Continental quota	Africa	2	1				
Continental quota	Africa	2	2				
Continental quota	Asia	3	1				
Continental quota	Asia	3	2				
Continental quota	Asia	3	3				
Continental quota	Europe	5	1				
Continental quota	Europe	5	2				
Continental quota	Europe	5	3				
Continental quota	Europe	5	4				
Continental quota	Europe	5	5				
Continental quota	Oceania	1	1	Australia	Jessica Malone		
Continental quota	America	3	1	Venezuela	Keivi Pinto	49	
Continental quota	America	3	2	Canada	Amy Cotton	39	
Continental quota	America	3	3	Brazil	Edinanci Silva	34	
Invitations	Host nation	1	—	Greece	Eleni Ioannou		
Invitations	I.O.C./.I.J.F./ ANOC		—	Republic of the Congo	Tatiana Bvegadzi		
