= Judo at the 2000 Summer Olympics – Women's 78 kg =

Women's 78 kg at the Games of the XXVII Olympiad
- Venue: Sydney Convention and Exhibition Centre
- Date: 21 September 2000
- Competitors: 23 from 23 nations

Medalists
1st place, gold medalist(s)		Tang Lin	China
2nd place, silver medalist(s)		Céline Lebrun	France
3rd place, bronze medalist(s)		Simona Richter	Romania
3rd place, bronze medalist(s)		Emanuela Pierantozzi	Italy

These are the results of the Women's 78 kg (also known as half-heavyweight) competition in judo at the 2000 Summer Olympics in Sydney. A total of 23 women qualified for this event, limited to jūdōka whose body weight was less than, or equal to, 78 kilograms. Competition took place in the Sydney Convention and Exhibition Centre on 21 September.

== Competitors ==
Athlete	Nation
Hsu Yuan-Lin	Chinese Taipei
Esther San Miguel	Spain
Céline Lebrun	France
Lee So-yeon	South Korea
Uta Kühnen	Germany
Mélanie Engoang	Gabon
Amy Tong	United States
Diadenis Luna	Cuba
Kimberly Ribble	Canada
Chloe Cowen	Great Britain
Laisa Laveti	Fiji
Simona Richter	Romania
Natalie Jenkinson	Australia
Sandra Godinho	Portugal
Edinanci Silva	Brazil
Sambuu Dashdulam	Mongolia
Nasiba Salaeva	Turkmenistan
Tang Lin	China
Akissa Monney	Ivory Coast
Heidi Rakels	Belgium
Karin Kienhuis	Netherlands
Noriko Anno	Japan
Emanuela Pierantozzi	Italy

== Main bracket ==
The gold and silver medalists were determined by the final match of the main single-elimination bracket.

Round of 32
Hsu Yuan-lin (TPE)	L
Esther San Miguel (ESP)	W
Uta Kühnen (GER)	W
Mélanie Engoang (GAB)	L
Diadenis Luna (CUB)	W
Kimberly Ribble (CAN)	L
Chloe Cowen (GBR)	W
Laisa Laveti (FIJ)	L
Sandra Godinho (POR)	L
Edinanci Silva (BRA)	W
Nasiba Salaeva (TKM)	L
Tang Lin (CHN)	W
Heidi Rakels (BEL)	W
Karin Kienhuis (NED)	L

Round of 16
Esther San Miguel (ESP)	L
Céline Lebrun (FRA)	W
Lee So-yeon (KOR)	W
Uta Kühnen (GER)	L
Amy Tong (USA)	L
Diadenis Luna (CUB)	W
Chloe Cowen (GBR)	L
Simona Richter (ROU)	W
Natalie Jenkinson (AUS)	L
Edinanci Silva (BRA)	W
Sambuugiin Dashdulam (MGL)	L
Tang Lin (CHN)	W
Akissi Monney (CIV)	L
Heidi Rakels (BEL)	W
Noriko Anno (JPN)	L
Emanuela Pierantozzi (ITA)	W

Quarterfinals
Céline Lebrun (FRA)	W
Lee So-yeon (KOR)	L
Diadenis Luna (CUB)	W
Simona Richter (ROU)	L
Edinanci Silva (BRA)	L
Tang Lin (CHN)	W
Heidi Rakels (BEL)	W
Emanuela Pierantozzi (ITA)	L

Semifinals
Céline Lebrun (FRA)	W
Diadenis Luna (CUB)	L
Tang Lin (CHN)	W
Heidi Rakels (BEL)	L

Gold medal final
Céline Lebrun (FRA)	L
Tang Lin (CHN)	W

=== Repechage ===
The losing semifinalists as well as those judoka eliminated in earlier rounds by the four semifinalists of the main bracket advanced to the repechage. These matches determined the two bronze medalists for the event.

First round
San Miguel (ESP)	W
Bye	L
Ribble (CAN)	L
Tong (USA)	W
Salaeva (TKM)	L
Dashdulam (MGL)	W
Kienhuis (NED)	W
Monney (CIV)	L

Second round
San Miguel (ESP)	L
Lee (KOR)	W
Tong (USA)	L
Richter (ROU)	W
Dashdulam (MGL)	L
Silva (BRA)	W
Kienhuis (NED)	L
Pierantozzi (ITA)	W

Third round
Lee (KOR)	L
Richter (ROU)	W
Silva (BRA)	L
Pierantozzi (ITA)	W

Bronze medal finals
Richter (ROU)	W
Rakels (BEL)	L
Pierantozzi (ITA)	W
Luna (CUB)	L
