= Rachel Wilding =

British Olympic judoka

Personal information
- Nationality: British (English)
- Born: 18 July 1976 (age 49) Woking, Surrey, England
- Occupation: Judoka
- Height: 1.75 m (5 ft 9 in)

Sport
- Country: Great Britain
- Sport: Judo
- Weight class: –70 kg, –78 kg
- Club: Camberley Judo Club

Achievements and titles
- Olympic Games: 9th (2004)
- World Champ.: 7th (2005)
- European Champ.: (silver) (2005)
Medal record
Women's judo
Representing Great Britain
European Championships
Silver medal – second place	2005 Rotterdam	–78 kg

Profile at external databases
- IJF: 53021
- JudoInside.com: 6577
- Updated on 17 November 2022

Rachel Wilding (born 18 July 1976 in Woking, Surrey, England) is an English judoka, who competed in the women's half-heavyweight category. She picked up a total of thirty-one medals in her career, and represented Great Britain in the 78-kg class at the 2004 Summer Olympics. Throughout most of her sporting career, Wilding trained for the Camberley Judo Club in Camberley under her personal coach and sensei Mark Earle.

== Judo career ==
Wilding was a three times champion of Great Britain, winning the middleweight division at the British Judo Championships in 2000 and the half-heavyweight title in 2002 and 2004.

Wilding qualified for Team GB in the women's half-heavyweight class (78 kg) at the 2004 Summer Olympics in Athens, by securing a place and a victory from the British judo trials in Wolverhampton. She opened her prelim match by throwing Spain's Esther San Miguel into the tatami on a brilliant ippon and an ura nage (rear throw) with only 25 seconds left in the clock, before falling short to Ukraine's Anastasiia Matrosova in the quarterfinals with a more robust tactic. Wilding gave herself a chance for an Olympic medal in the repechage round, but wasted her charm with a tough defeat from South Korea's Lee So-yeon.

At the 2005 European Judo Championships in Rotterdam, Netherlands, Wilding recorded her career best to pick up a silver medal in the 78-kg division, losing out to neighboring France's Céline Lebrun in the final.
