= 1999 European Judo Championships =

1999 Judo European Judo Championships
- Location: Bratislava, Slovakia
- Dates: 22–23 May 1999

Competition at external databases
- Links: JudoInside

The 1999 European Judo Championships were the 10th edition of the European Judo Championships, and were held in Bratislava, Slovakia from 22 to 23 May 1999.

== Medal overview ==
=== Men ===
Event	Gold	Silver	Bronze
60 kg	(Spain) Óscar Peñas	(Belgium) Cédric Taymans	(Georgia (country)) Nestor Khergiani (Belarus) Natik Bagirov
66 kg	(France) Larbi Benboudaoud	(Italy) Girolamo Giovinazzo	(Turkey) Hüseyin Özkan (Moldova) Victor Bivol
73 kg	(Italy) Giuseppe Maddaloni	(Estonia) Aleksei Budõlin	(Georgia (country)) Giorgi Vazagashvili (Russia) Vitali Makarov
81 kg	(Portugal) Nuno Delgado	(Netherlands) Maarten Arens	(United Kingdom) Graeme Randall (France) Djamel Bouras
90 kg	(Belgium) Daan De Cooman	(Lithuania) Algimantas Merkevičius	(Netherlands) Mark Huizinga (Azerbaijan) Rasul Salimov
100 kg	(France) Stéphane Traineau	(Poland) Paweł Nastula	(Russia) Aleksandr Mikhailine (Israel) Ariel Ze'evi
+100 kg	(Russia) Tamerlan Tmenov	(Slovakia) Semir Pepic	(Estonia) Indrek Pertelson (Turkey) Selim Tataroğlu
Open class	(Turkey) Selim Tataroğlu	(Spain) Ernesto Pérez	(Netherlands) Dennis van der Geest (Romania) Alexandru Lungu

=== Women ===
Event	Gold	Silver	Bronze
48 kg	(France) Sarah Nichilo-Rosso	(Romania) Laura Moise	(Belgium) Ann Simons (Russia) Lioubov Brouletova
52 kg	(United Kingdom) Deborah Allan	(Portugal) Paula Saldanha	(Netherlands) Deborah Gravenstijn (Germany) Raffaella Imbriani
57 kg	(Spain) Isabel Fernández	(France) Magali Baton	(Italy) Cinzia Cavazzuti (Czech Republic) Michaela Vernerová
63 kg	(Belgium) Gella Vandecaveye	(Italy) Jenny Gal	(Germany) Anja von Rekowski (Spain) Sara Álvarez
70 kg	(Belgium) Ulla Werbrouck	(Italy) Ylenia Scapin	(Germany) Yvonne Wansart (Spain) Úrsula Martín
78 kg	(France) Céline Lebrun	(Russia) Svetlana Panteleeva	(Belgium) Heidi Rakels (United Kingdom) Chloe Cowen
+78 kg	(Russia) Irina Rodina	(Bulgaria) Tsvetana Bozhilova	(Belgium) Brigitte Olivier (Germany) Sandra Köppen
Open class	(Germany) Katja Gerber	(Belgium) Brigitte Olivier	(Italy) Clementina Papa (Netherlands) Françoise Harteveld

=== Medals table ===
Rank	Nation	Gold	Silver	Bronze	Total
1	France	4	1	1	6
2	Belgium	3	2	3	8
3	Russia	2	1	3	6
4	Spain	2	1	2	5
5	Italy	1	3	2	6
6	Portugal	1	1	0	2
7	Germany	1	0	4	5
8	Great Britain	1	0	2	3
8	Turkey	1	0	2	3
10	Netherlands	0	1	4	5
11	Romania	0	1	1	2
11	Estonia	0	1	1	2
13	Bulgaria	0	1	0	1
13	Lithuania	0	1	0	1
13	Poland	0	1	0	1
13	Slovakia	0	1	0	1
16	Georgia	0	0	2	2
17	Azerbaijan	0	0	1	1
17	Belarus	0	0	1	1
17	Czech Republic	0	0	1	1
17	Israel	0	0	1	1
17	Moldova	0	0	1	1

== Results overview ==
=== Men ===
==== 60 kg ====
Position	Judoka	Country
1.	Óscar Peñas	Spain
2.	Cédric Taymans	Belgium
3.	Nestor Khergiani	Georgia
3.	Natik Bagirov	Belarus
5.	Ulduz Sultanov	Azerbaijan
5.	Pedro Caravana	Portugal
7.	Éric Despezelle	France
7.	David Moret	Switzerland

==== 66 kg ====
Position	Judoka	Country
1.	Larbi Benboudaoud	France
2.	Girolamo Giovinazzo	Italy
3.	Hüseyin Özkan	Turkey
3.	Victor Bivol	Moldova
5.	Giorgi Revazishvili	Georgia
5.	Marek Matuszek	Slovakia
7.	David Somerville	Great Britain
7.	Georgi Georgiev	Bulgaria

==== 73 kg ====
Position	Judoka	Country
1.	Giuseppe Maddaloni	Italy
2.	Aleksei Budõlin	Estonia
3.	Giorgi Vazagashvili	Georgia
3.	Vitali Makarov	Russia
5.	Martin Schmidt	Germany
5.	Andrei Golban	Moldova
7.	Koen van Nol	Netherlands
7.	Mika Mäkelä	Finland

==== 81 kg ====
Position	Judoka	Country
1.	Nuno Delgado	Portugal
2.	Maarten Arens	Netherlands
3.	Graeme Randall	Great Britain
3.	Djamel Bouras	France
5.	Soso Liparteliani	Georgia
5.	Robertas Rimas	Lithuania
7.	Sergio Doménech	Spain
7.	Sergei Kukharenka	Belarus

==== 90 kg ====
Position	Judoka	Country
1.	Daan De Cooman	Belgium
2.	Algimantas Merkevičius	Lithuania
3.	Mark Huizinga	Netherlands
3.	Rasul Salimov	Azerbaijan
5.	Vincenzo Carabetta	France
5.	George Gugava	Georgia
7.	Winston Gordon	Great Britain
7.	Lamberto Raffi	Italy

==== 100 kg ====
Position	Judoka	Country
1.	Stéphane Traineau	France
2.	Paweł Nastula	Poland
3.	Aleksandr Mikhailine	Russia
3.	Ariel Ze'evi	Israel
5.	Daniel Gürschner	Germany
5.	Gintaras Ambraska	Lithuania
7.	Luigi Guido	Italy
7.	Iveri Jikurauli	Georgia

==== +100 kg ====
Position	Judoka	Country
1.	Tamerlan Tmenov	Russia
2.	Semir Pepic	Slovakia
3.	Indrek Pertelson	Estonia
3.	Selim Tataroğlu	Turkey
5.	Jérôme Dreyfus	France
5.	Ruslan Sharapov	Belarus
7.	Dennis van der Geest	Netherlands
7.	Eric Krieger	Austria

==== Open class ====
Position	Judoka	Country
1.	Selim Tataroğlu	Turkey
2.	Ernesto Pérez	Spain
3.	Dennis van der Geest	Netherlands
3.	Alexandru Lungu	Romania
5.	Ramaz Chochosvili	Georgia
5.	Semir Pepic	Slovakia
7.	David Douillet	France
7.	Ireneusz Kwieciński	Poland

=== Women ===
==== 48 kg ====
Position	Judoka	Country
1.	Sarah Nichilo-Rosso	France
2.	Laura Moise	Romania
3.	Ann Simons	Belgium
3.	Lioubov Brouletova	Russia
5.	Giuseppina Macri	Italy
5.	Monika Kurath	Switzerland
7.	Anna-Maria Gradante	Germany
7.	Neşe Şensoy	Turkey

==== 52 kg ====
Position	Judoka	Country
1.	Deborah Allan	Great Britain
2.	Paula Saldanha	Portugal
3.	Deborah Gravenstijn	Netherlands
3.	Raffaella Imbriani	Germany
5.	Heidi Goossens	Belgium
5.	Marie-Claire Restoux	France
7.	Isabelle Schmutz	Switzerland
7.	Miren León	Spain

==== 57 kg ====
Position	Judoka	Country
1.	Isabel Fernández	Spain
2.	Magali Baton	France
3.	Cinzia Cavazzuti	Italy
3.	Michaela Vernerová	Czech Republic
5.	Ivana Remitska	Ukraine
5.	Lena Göldi	Switzerland
7.	Nicola Fairbrother	Great Britain
7.	Antje Lehmann	Germany

==== 63 kg ====
Position	Judoka	Country
1.	Gella Vandecaveye	Belgium
2.	Jenny Gal	Italy
3.	Anja von Rekowski	Germany
3.	Sara Álvarez	Spain
5.	Daniëlle Vriezema	Netherlands
5.	Irena Tokarz	Poland
7.	Karine Lecoeuche	France
7.	Eszter Csizmadia	Hungary

==== 70 kg ====
Position	Judoka	Country
1.	Ulla Werbrouck	Belgium
2.	Ylenia Scapin	Italy
3.	Yvonne Wansart	Germany
3.	Úrsula Martín	Spain
5.	Tetyana Belajeva	Ukraine
5.	Ioulia Kouzina	Russia
7.	Claudia Zwiers	Netherlands
7.	Catarina Rodrigues	Portugal

==== 78 kg ====
Position	Judoka	Country
1.	Céline Lebrun	France
2.	Svetlana Panteleeva	Russia
3.	Heidi Rakels	Belgium
3.	Chloe Cowen	Great Britain
5.	Esther San Miguel	Spain
5.	Simona Richter	Romania
7.	Anastasiya Matrosova	Ukraine
7.	Lucia Morico	Italy

==== +78 kg ====
Position	Judoka	Country
1.	Irina Rodina	Russia
2.	Tsvetana Bozhilova	Bulgaria
3.	Brigitte Olivier	Belgium
3.	Sandra Köppen	Germany
5.	Karina Bryant	Great Britain
5.	Clementina Papa	Italy
7.	Mara Kovačević	FR Yugoslavia
7.	Olga Tarasova	Belarus

==== Open class ====
Position	Judoka	Country
1.	Katja Gerber	Germany
2.	Brigitte Olivier	Belgium
3.	Clementina Papa	Italy
3.	Françoise Harteveld	Netherlands
5.	Anastasiya Matrosova	Ukraine
5.	Simone Callender	Great Britain
7.	Tsvetana Bozhilova	Bulgaria
7.	Virginie Jaulin	France
