= Mika =

Mika is a given name, a nickname, and a surname. Notable people and fictional characters with the name include:

== People known just as Mika ==
- Mika (singer) (born 1983), Lebanese-born British singer-songwriter Michael Penniman, Jr.
- Mika (footballer, born 1987), Portuguese football defender Michael da Conceição Figueiredo
- Mika (footballer, born 1991), Portuguese football goalkeeper Michael Simões Domingues
- Mika (footballer, born 1993), Spanish football striker for Negeri Sembilan
- Mika (Armenian singer), Michael Varosyan, who represented Armenia in the Junior Eurovision Song Contest 2015
- Mika X (born 1962), New Zealand Maori performing artist

=== Fictional characters ===
- Mika, a character in the horror game Ao Oni
- Mika, a character in 2020 video game Genshin Impact

== Mika as a given name ==
=== Male given name (primarily used in Finland) ===
- Mika Aaltola (born 1969), Finnish political scientist and director of the Finnish Institute of International Affairs
- Mika Aaltonen (born 1965), Finnish football player
- Mika Chunuonsee (born 1989), Thai football player
- Mika Godts (born 2005), Belgian football player
- Mika Häkkinen (born 1968), Finnish Formula One double World Champion
- Mika Halvari (born 1970), Finnish shot putter
- Mika Hannula (born 1979), Swedish ice hockey player
- Mika Helin (born 1978), Finnish football player
- Mika Horiuchi (born 1986), Japanese-American musician
- Mika Immonen (1972–2025), Finnish pool player
- Mika Ják (died after 1202), Hungarian noble
- Mika Kallio (born 1982), Finnish motorcycle racer
- Mika Karppinen (born 1971), Finnish drummer better known as Gas Lipstick
- Mika Kaurismäki (born 1955), Finnish film director
- Mika Koivuniemi (born 1967), Finnish ten-pin bowler
- Mika Kojonkoski (born 1963), Finnish ski jumper and politician
- Mika Kuusisto (born 1967), Finnish cross-country skier
- Mika Lahtinen (born 1985), Finnish football player
- Mika Laitinen (born 1973), Finnish ski jumper
- Mika Lavento (born 1962), Finnish archaeologist
- Mika Lehkosuo (born 1970), Finnish football player and manager
- Mika Luttinen (born 1971), Finnish musician
- Mika Mäkelä (born 1971), Finnish judoka
- Mika Marila (born 1973), Finnish alpine skier
- Mika Muranen (born 1971), Finnish prisoner
- Mika Myllylä (1969–2011), Finnish cross-country skier
- Mika Mäkeläinen (born 1965), Finnish journalist and nonfiction writer
- Mika Niskanen (born 1973), Finnish ice hockey player
- Mika Noronen (born 1979), Finnish ice hockey player
- Mika Nurmela (born 1971), Finnish football player
- Mika Orasmaa (born 1976), Finnish cinematographer
- Mika-Matti Paatelainen (born 1967), Finnish football manager, better known as Mixu Paatelainen
- Mika Peltonen (born 1965), Finnish military officer
- Mika Pohjola (born 1971), Finnish jazz pianist
- Mikaele Ravalawa (born 1997), Fijian rugby league player
- Mika Ronkainen (born 1970), Finnish film director
- Mika Salo (born 1966), Finnish Formula One driver
- Mika Sankala (born 1964), Finnish football manager and former footballer
- Mika Singh (born 1977), Indian entertainer
- Mika Špiljak (1916–2007), Yugoslav politician
- Mika Strömberg (born 1970), Finnish ice hockey player
- Mika Tauriainen (born 1975), Finnish rock singer
- Mika Vainio, member of the Finnish electronic duo Pan Sonic
- Mika Vasara (born 1983), Finnish shot putter
- Mika Väyrynen (footballer) (born 1981), Finnish football player
- Mika Vukona, (born 1982), Fijian-born New Zealand basketball player
- Mika Waltari (1908–1979), Finnish author
- Mika Zibanejad, (born 1993), Swedish ice hockey player

=== Female given name (美佳, 美香, etc., primarily used in Japan) ===
- Mika Akino (born 1973), the Japanese wrestler AKINO
- Mika Arisaka (born 1974), Japanese-American singer
- Mika Boorem (born 1987), American actress
- Mika Brzezinski (born 1967), American television journalist, co-host of Morning Joe
- Mika Doi (born 1956), Japanese voice actress
- Mika Handa, singer with the band Mika Bomb
- Mika Haruna (春名 美佳; born 1978), Japanese swimmer
- Mika Hijii (肘井 美佳; born 1982), Japanese actress and gravure idol
- Mika Hori (堀 珠花; born 1992), Japanese ice hockey player
- Mika Kanai (born 1964), Japanese voice actress
- Mika Kato, namesake singer of the Sadistic Mika Band
- Mika Katsumura (勝村 美香; born 1980), Japanese actress
- Mika Kawamura (born 1973), Japanese manga artist
- Mika Kikuchi (born 1983), Japanese actress
- Mika Miyazato (born 1989), Japanese golfer
- Mika Nakashima (born 1983), Japanese singer
- Mika Newton (born 1986), Ukrainian singer
- Mika Reyes (born 1994), Filipina volleyball player
- Mika Stojsavljevic (born 2008), British tennis player
- Mika Toba (born 1961), Japanese katazome dye artist
- Mika Todd (born 1984), American jazz singer and former Hello! Project member
- Mika Urbaniak (born 1980), American pop singer
- Mika Yamamoto (1967–2012), Japanese journalist
- Mika Yamauchi (born 1969), Japanese volleyball player
- Mika Yoshikawa (吉川 美香; born 1984), Japanese middle- and long-distance runner

=== Nickname or stage name ===
- Mika Antić (1932–1986), Serbian poet
- Mika Singh (born 1977), Indian singer born Amrik Singh
- Radomir Lazović (born 1980), Serbian politician and activist, whose nickname is Mika

=== Fictional characters ===
- Mika Ahonen, from the anime/manga Strike Witches
- Mika Edou, minor character from the anime Smile PreCure!
- Mika Grainger, from British school drama series Waterloo Road
- Mika Hyuga, a character from the anime Six God Combination Godmars
- Mika Jougasaki, from The Idolmaster Cinderella Girls video game
- Mika Kamishiro (神代美香), a character in the show Kamen Rider Kabuto, is an older sister of Tsurugi Kamishiro / Kamen Rider Sasword
- Mika Kujiin, one of the main characters in the Kanamemo anime/manga
- Mika Macklin, one of the main characters in the television show Danger Force
- Mika Nanakawa (R. Mika), from the fighting video games Street Fighter Alpha 3 and Street Fighter V
- Mika Natsume (夏目実加), a character in the show Kamen Rider Kuuga
- Mika Nogizaka, from the light novel and anime Nogizaka Haruka No Himitsu
- Mika Shido, a character from the tokusatsu Chouseishin Gransazer
- Mika Tahara, from the manga Koizora
- Mika Samuels, from the television series The Walking Dead
- Mika Shimotsuki, from the anime Psycho-Pass
- Mikaela "Mika" Hyakuya, from the anime Seraph of the End
- Mikazuki "Mika" Augus, from Mobile Suit Gundam: Iron Blooded Orphans
- Mika Returna, a character in the fighting game Under Night In-Birth
- Mika Kanda, a character in the fighting game Gantz
- Mika Koizumi (小泉ミカ), a character in the show Choudenshi Bioman
- Mika Yamaguchi (山口美香), a character in the show Kousoku Sentai Turboranger
- Meekah, character in Moonbug preschool channel Blippi
- Mika Kagehira (影片みか), a male character from the rhythm game Ensemble Stars!
- Mika Misono (聖園ミカ), a character from the role-playing game Blue Archive
- Mika Mikage, a minor character from Little Battlers Experience

== Mika as a surname (primarily used in Polynesia and Poland) ==
- Arūnas Mika (born 1970), Lithuanian association footballer
- Audrey Mika (born 2000), American singer and songwriter
- Bascha Mika (born 1954), German journalist
- Brad Mika (born 1981), New Zealand rugby union player
- Constantine Mika (born 1989), Samoan rugby league player
- Dylan Mika (1972–2018), New Zealand rugby union player
- Eric Mika (born 1995), American basketball player
- Jarosław Mika (born 1962), Polish military officer
- Mateusz Mika (born 1991), Polish volleyball player
- Michael Mika (born 1968), New Zealand Samoan rugby union player and jurist
- Miché Mika (born 1996), Congolese association footballer
- Setefano Mika, former name of Aunese Curreen (born 1985), Samoan middle-distance runner
- Václav Míka (born 2000), Czech association footballer

=== Fictional characters ===
- R. Mika, from the Street Fighter video game series
- Mikaela "Mika" Hyakuya, a teenage boy and a character in Owari no Seraph

== Other ==
- RABe 528 electric multiple units of BLS, niknamed MIKA
