= Judo at the 2004 Summer Olympics – Women's 78 kg =

Women's 78 kg at the Games of the XXVIII Olympiad
- Venue: Ano Liossia Olympic Hall
- Dates: 19 August 2004
- Competitors: 21 from 21 nations
- Winning score: 1010

Medalists
1st place, gold medalist(s)		Noriko Anno	Japan
2nd place, silver medalist(s)		Liu Xia	China
3rd place, bronze medalist(s)		Yurisel Laborde	Cuba
3rd place, bronze medalist(s)		Lucia Morico	Italy

Women's 78 kg competition in judo at the 2004 Summer Olympics was held on August 19 at the Ano Liossia Olympic Hall.

This event was the second-heaviest of the women's judo weight classes, limiting competitors to a maximum of 78 kilograms of body mass. Like all other judo events, bouts lasted five minutes. If the bout was still tied at the end, it was extended for another five-minute, sudden-death period; if neither judoka scored during that period, the match is decided by the judges. The tournament bracket consisted of a single-elimination contest culminating in a gold medal match. There was also a repechage to determine the winners of the two bronze medals. Each judoka who had lost to a semifinalist competed in the repechage. The two judokas who lost in the semifinals faced the winner of the opposite half of the bracket's repechage in bronze medal bouts.

== Schedule ==
All times are Greece Standard Time (UTC+2)

Date	Time	Round
Thursday, 19 August 2004	10:30; 13:00; 17:00	Preliminaries; Repechage; Final

== Qualifying athletes ==
Mat	AthleteESP	Country
1	Céline Lebrun	France
1	Varvara Massyagina	Kazakhstan
1	Nicole Kubes	United States
1	Houda Ben Daya	Tunisia
1	Edinanci Silva	Brazil
1	Sisilia Nasiga	Fiji
1	Keivi Pinto	Venezuela
1	Noriko Anno	Japan
1	Lucia Morico	Italy
1	Mélanie Engoang	Gabon
1	Amy Cotton	Canada
2	Yurisel Laborde	Cuba
2	Uta Kühnen	Germany
2	Liu Xia	China
2	Claudia Zwiers	Netherlands
2	Vera Moskalyuk	Russia
2	Lee So-yeon	South Korea
2	Anastasiia Matrosova	Ukraine
2	Varvara Akritidou	Greece
2	Esther San Miguel	Spain
2	Rachel Wilding	Great Britain

== Tournament results ==
=== Final ===
Final
1	Noriko Anno (JPN)	1010
2	Liu Xia (CHN)	0001

=== Mat 1 ===
Round of 32
Varvara Massyagina (KAZ)	0000
Nicole Kubes (USA)	1000
Sisilia Nasiga (FIJ)	0000
Keivi Pinto (VEN)	0021
Mélanie Engoang (GAB)	0000
Amy Cotton (CAN)	1000

Round of 16
Céline Lebrun (FRA)	1011
Nicole Kubes (USA)	0000
Houda Ben Daya (TUN)	0001
Edinanci Silva (BRA)	1020
Keivi Pinto (VEN)	0000
Noriko Anno (JPN)	1011
Lucia Morico (ITA)	1010
Amy Cotton (CAN)	0000

Quarterfinals
Céline Lebrun (FRA)	0001
Edinanci Silva (BRA)	0000
Noriko Anno (JPN)	0101
Lucia Morico (ITA)	0001

Semifinals
Céline Lebrun (FRA)	0000
Noriko Anno (JPN)	0010

=== Mat 2 ===
Round of 32
Liu Xia (CHN)	1000
Claudia Zwiers (NED)	0111
Lee So-yeon (KOR)	0000
Anastasiia Matrosova (UKR)	1000

Round of 16
Yurisel Laborde (CUB)	0011
Uta Kühnen (GER)	0001
Liu Xia (CHN)	0120
Vera Moskalyuk (RUS)	0000
Anastasiia Matrosova (UKR)	1100
Varvara Akritidou (GRE)	0000
Esther San Miguel (ESP)	0011
Rachel Wilding (GBR)	1011

Quarterfinals
Yurisel Laborde (CUB)	0000
Liu Xia (CHN)	1001
Anastasiia Matrosova (UKR)	1000
Rachel Wilding (GBR)	0000

Semifinals
Liu Xia (CHN)	0001
Anastasiia Matrosova (UKR)	0000

=== Repechage ===
Those judoka eliminated in earlier rounds by the four semifinalists of the main bracket advanced to the repechage. These matches determined the two bronze medalists for the event.

First round
Claudia Zwiers (NED)	0000
Vera Moskalyuk (RUS)	0102
Lee So-yeon (KOR)	1000
Varvara Akritidou (GRE)	0000

Second round
Nicole Kubes (USA)	0001
Edinanci Silva (BRA)	0200
Keivi Pinto (VEN)	0000
Lucia Morico (ITA)	1001
Vera Moskalyuk (RUS)	0000
Yurisel Laborde (CUB)	1001
Lee So-yeon (KOR)	0001
Rachel Wilding (GBR)	0000

Third round
Edinanci Silva (BRA)	0011
Lucia Morico (ITA)	0120
Yurisel Laborde (CUB)	0030
Lee So-yeon (KOR)	0022

Bronze medal finals
Lucia Morico (ITA)	1000
Anastasiia Matrosova (UKR)	0000
Yurisel Laborde (CUB)	1001
Céline Lebrun (FRA)	0001
