= Varvara Akritidou =

Greek judoka (born 1981)

Personal information
- Full name: Varvara Akritidou
- Born: 15 July 1981 (age 45) Thessaloniki, Greece
- Occupation: Judoka
- Height: 1.73 m (5 ft 8 in)

Sport
- Country: Greece
- Sport: Judo
- Weight class: –78 kg
- Club: Nemesis Thessaloniki
Medal record
Women's judo
Representing Greece
European U23 Championships
Bronze medal – third place	2003 Yerevan	–78 kg

Profile at external databases
- IJF: 22996
- JudoInside.com: 7776
- Updated on 13 February 2022

Varvara Akritidou (Greek: Βαρβάρα Ακριτίδου; Born 15 July 1981 in Thessaloniki) is a Greek judoka, who competed in the women's half-heavyweight category. She held two Greek senior titles in her own division, picked up a total of six medals in her career, and represented her home nation Greece at the 2004 Summer Olympics in Athens.

Akritidou qualified for the Greek squad in the women's half-heavyweight class (78 kg) at the 2004 Summer Olympics in Athens, by filling up an entry by the International Judo Federation and the Hellenic Olympic Committee, as Greece received an automatic berth for being the host nation. She lost her opening match to an experienced Ukrainian judoka Anastasiia Matrosova, who successfully scored an ippon and dropped her to the tatami with a sukui nage (double leg takedown) assault at two minutes. In the repechage, Akritidou raised her hopes of claiming an Olympic bronze medal for the host nation, but slipped them away in a defeat to South Korea's Lee So-yeon by an ippon and a kami shiho gatame one minute and sixteen seconds into their first playoff of the draw.
