= Chloe Cowen =

British judoka (born 1973)

Personal information
- Nationality: British (English)
- Born: 8 June 1973 (age 53) Newcastle upon Tyne, England
- Occupation: Judoka

Sport
- Sport: Judo
- Weight class: –66kg/-78kg
Medal record
Representing Great Britain
European Championships
Silver medal – second place	1993 Athens	-66kg
Silver medal – second place	1997 Ostend	-72kg
Bronze medal – third place	1998 Oviedo	-78kg
Bronze medal – third place	1999 Bratislava	-78kg
Silver medal – second place	2000 Wroclaw	-78kg

Profile at external databases
- JudoInside.com: 309

Chloe Cowen (born 8 June 1973) is a British judoka, who competed at the Olympic Games.

== Judo career ==
Cowen is a five times champion of Great Britain, winning the middleweight division at the British Judo Championships in 1992, 1993 and 1994 and the half-heavyweight division in 1998 and 1999.

She is also a five times European medalist; winning medals at the 1993 European Judo Championships in Athens, the 1997 European Judo Championships in Ostend, the 1998 European Judo Championships in Oviedo, the 1999 European Judo Championships in Bratislava and the 2000 European Judo Championships in Wroclaw. In 2000, she was selected to represent Great Britain at the 2000 Summer Olympics in Sydney; competing in the women's half-heavyweight event and was eliminated by Simona Richter.

Since retirement, she became a judo teacher, and in 2022, she became the National Lead Performance Coach for Irish Judo. She has also been a judo commentator.
