= 2001 World Judo Championships =

Judo competition

Judo 2001 World Judo Championships
- Venue: Olympiahalle
- Location: Munich, Germany
- Dates: 26–29 July 2001
- Competitors: 586 from 89 nations

Competition at external databases
- Links: IJF • JudoInside

The 2001 World Judo Championships were the 22nd edition of the World Judo Championships, and were held at Olympiahalle in Munich, Germany in 2001.

== Medal overview ==
=== Men ===
Event	Gold	Silver	Bronze
Extra-lightweight (60 kg)	Anis Lounifi (TUN)	Cédric Taymans (BEL)	John Buchanan (GBR)
Extra-lightweight (60 kg)	Anis Lounifi (TUN)	Cédric Taymans (BEL)	Kazuhiko Tokuno (JPN)
Half-lightweight (66 kg)	Arash Miresmaili (IRI)	Musa Nastuyev (UKR)	Yordanis Arencibia (CUB)
Half-lightweight (66 kg)	Arash Miresmaili (IRI)	Musa Nastuyev (UKR)	Kim Hyung-ju (KOR)
Lightweight (73 kg)	Vitaliy Makarov (RUS)	Yusuke Kanamaru (JPN)	Askhat Shakharov (KAZ)
Lightweight (73 kg)	Vitaliy Makarov (RUS)	Yusuke Kanamaru (JPN)	Krzysztof Wiłkomirski (POL)
Half-middleweight (81 kg)	Cho In-chul (KOR)	Aleksei Budõlin (EST)	Sergei Aschwanden (SUI)
Half-middleweight (81 kg)	Cho In-chul (KOR)	Aleksei Budõlin (EST)	Elkhan Rajabli (AZE)
Middleweight (90 kg)	Frédéric Demontfaucon (FRA)	Zurab Zviadauri (GEO)	Rasul Salimov (AZE)
Middleweight (90 kg)	Frédéric Demontfaucon (FRA)	Zurab Zviadauri (GEO)	Yoon Dong-sik (KOR)
Half-heavyweight (100 kg)	Kosei Inoue (JPN)	Antal Kovács (HUN)	Jang Sung-ho (KOR)
Half-heavyweight (100 kg)	Kosei Inoue (JPN)	Antal Kovács (HUN)	Askhat Zhitkeyev (KAZ)
Heavyweight (+100 kg)	Alexander Mikhaylin (RUS)	Selim Tataroğlu (TUR)	Mahmoud Miran (IRI)
Heavyweight (+100 kg)	Alexander Mikhaylin (RUS)	Selim Tataroğlu (TUR)	Shinichi Shinohara (JPN)
Openweight	Alexander Mikhaylin (RUS)	Ariel Ze'evi (ISR)	Frank Möller (GER)
Openweight	Alexander Mikhaylin (RUS)	Ariel Ze'evi (ISR)	Dennis van der Geest (NED)

=== Women ===
Event	Gold	Silver	Bronze
Extra-lightweight (48 kg)	Ryoko Tamura (JPN)	Ri Kyong-ok (PRK)	Danieska Carrión (CUB)
Extra-lightweight (48 kg)	Ryoko Tamura (JPN)	Ri Kyong-ok (PRK)	Giuseppina Macrì (ITA)
Half-lightweight (52 kg)	Kye Sun-hui (PRK)	Raffaella Imbriani (GER)	Liu Yuxiang (CHN)
Half-lightweight (52 kg)	Kye Sun-hui (PRK)	Raffaella Imbriani (GER)	Legna Verdecia (CUB)
Lightweight (57 kg)	Yurisleidis Lupetey (CUB)	Deborah Gravenstijn (NED)	Isabel Fernández (ESP)
Lightweight (57 kg)	Yurisleidis Lupetey (CUB)	Deborah Gravenstijn (NED)	Kie Kusakabe (JPN)
Half-middleweight (63 kg)	Gella Vandecaveye (BEL)	Sara Álvarez (ESP)	Anaysi Hernández (CUB)
Half-middleweight (63 kg)	Gella Vandecaveye (BEL)	Sara Álvarez (ESP)	Ayumi Tanimoto (JPN)
Middleweight (70 kg)	Masae Ueno (JPN)	Kate Howey (GBR)	Regla Leyén (CUB)
Middleweight (70 kg)	Masae Ueno (JPN)	Kate Howey (GBR)	Ulla Werbrouck (BEL)
Half-heavyweight (78 kg)	Noriko Anno (JPN)	Yurisel Laborde (CUB)	Céline Lebrun (FRA)
Half-heavyweight (78 kg)	Noriko Anno (JPN)	Yurisel Laborde (CUB)	Lee So-yeon (KOR)
Heavyweight (+78 kg)	Yuan Hua (CHN)	Midori Shintani (JPN)	Daima Beltrán (CUB)
Heavyweight (+78 kg)	Yuan Hua (CHN)	Midori Shintani (JPN)	Sandra Köppen (GER)
Openweight	Céline Lebrun (FRA)	Karina Bryant (GBR)	Catarina Rodrigues (POR)
Openweight	Céline Lebrun (FRA)	Karina Bryant (GBR)	Tong Wen (CHN)

=== Medal table ===
* Host nation (Germany)

Rank	Nation	Gold	Silver	Bronze	Total
1	Japan (JPN)	4	2	4	10
2	Russia (RUS)	3	0	0	3
3	France (FRA)	2	0	1	3
4	Cuba (CUB)	1	1	6	8
5	Belgium (BEL)	1	1	1	3
6	North Korea (PRK)	1	1	0	2
7	South Korea (KOR)	1	0	4	5
8	China (CHN)	1	0	2	3
9	Iran (IRN)	1	0	1	2
10	Tunisia (TUN)	1	0	0	1
11	Great Britain (GBR)	0	2	1	3
12	Germany (GER)*	0	1	2	3
13	Netherlands (NED)	0	1	1	2
13	Spain (ESP)	0	1	1	2
15	Estonia (EST)	0	1	0	1
15	Georgia (GEO)	0	1	0	1
15	Hungary (HUN)	0	1	0	1
15	Israel (ISR)	0	1	0	1
15	Turkey (TUR)	0	1	0	1
15	Ukraine (UKR)	0	1	0	1
21	Azerbaijan (AZE)	0	0	2	2
21	Kazakhstan (KAZ)	0	0	2	2
23	Italy (ITA)	0	0	1	1
23	Poland (POL)	0	0	1	1
23	Portugal (POR)	0	0	1	1
23	Switzerland (SUI)	0	0	1	1
Totals (26 entries)		16	16	32	64

== Results overview ==
=== Men ===
==== 60 kg ====
Position	Judoka	Country
1.	Anis Lounifi	Tunisia
2.	Cédric Taymans	Belgium
3.	John Buchanan	Great Britain
3.	Kazuhiko Tokuno	Japan
5.	Elchin Ismaylov	Azerbaijan
5.	Nestor Khergiani	Georgia
7.	João Derly	Brazil
7.	Óscar Peñas	Spain

==== 66 kg ====
Position	Judoka	Country
1.	Arash Miresmaili	Iran
2.	Musa Nastuyev	Ukraine
3.	Yordanis Arencibia	Cuba
3.	Kim Hyung-ju	South Korea
5.	Islam Matsiev	Russia
5.	Amar Meridja	Algeria
7.	Jozef Krnáč	Slovakia
7.	Bryan van Dyk	Netherlands

==== 73 kg ====
Position	Judoka	Country
1.	Vitaliy Makarov	Russia
2.	Yusuke Kanamaru	Japan
3.	Askhat Shakharov	Kazakhstan
3.	Krzysztof Wiłkomirski	Poland
5.	Min Sung-ho	South Korea
5.	Andrey Shturbabin	Uzbekistan
7.	Illya Chymchyuri	Ukraine
7.	Germán Velazco	Peru

==== 81 kg ====
Position	Judoka	Country
1.	Cho In-chul	South Korea
2.	Aleksei Budõlin	Estonia
3.	Sergei Aschwanden	Switzerland
3.	Elkhan Rajabli	Azerbaijan
5.	Kenzo Nakamura	Japan
5.	Graeme Randall	Great Britain
7.	Adil Belgaid	Morocco
7.	Flávio Honorato	Brazil

==== 90 kg ====
Position	Judoka	Country
1.	Frédéric Demontfaucon	France
2.	Zurab Zviadauri	Georgia
3.	Rasul Salimov	Azerbaijan
3.	Yoon Dong-sik	South Korea
5.	Skander Hachicha	Tunisia
5.	Amel Mekić	Bosnia and Herzegovina
7.	Mouslim Gajimagomedov	Russia
7.	Keith Morgan	Canada

==== 100 kg ====
Position	Judoka	Country
1.	Kosei Inoue	Japan
2.	Antal Kovács	Hungary
3.	Jang Sung-ho	South Korea
3.	Askhat Zhitkeyev	Kazakhstan
5.	Iveri Jikurauli	Georgia
5.	Ghislain Lemaire	France
7.	Nicolas Gill	Canada
7.	Vernharð Þorleifsson	Iceland

==== +100 kg ====
Position	Judoka	Country
1.	Alexandre Mikhaylin	Russia
2.	Selim Tataroğlu	Turkey
3.	Seyed Mahmoudreza Miran	Iran
3.	Shinichi Shinohara	Japan
5.	Indrek Pertelson	Estonia
5.	Georgi Tonkov	Bulgaria
7.	Aytami Ruano	Spain
7.	Andreas Tölzer	Germany

==== Open class ====
Position	Judoka	Country
1.	Alexandre Mikhaylin	Russia
2.	Ariel Ze'evi	Israel
3.	Frank Möller	Germany
3.	Dennis van der Geest	Netherlands
5.	Ramaz Chochishvili	Georgia
5.	Daniel Hernandes	Brazil
7.	Alexandru Lungu	Romania
7.	Yasuyuki Muneta	Japan

=== Women ===
==== 48 kg ====
Position	Judoka	Country
1.	Ryoko Tamura	Japan
2.	Ri Kyong-ok	North Korea
3.	Danieska Carrión	Cuba
3.	Giuseppina Macrì	Italy
5.	Kim Young-ran	South Korea
5.	Anna Żemła	Poland
7.	Sarah Nichilo-Rosso	France
7.	Tatyana Shishkina	Russia

==== 52 kg ====
Position	Judoka	Country
1.	Kye Sun-hui	North Korea
2.	Raffaella Imbriani	Germany
3.	Liu Yuxiang	China
3.	Legna Verdecia	Cuba
5.	Salima Souakri	Algeria
5.	Yuki Yokosawa	Japan
7.	Ioana Dinea	Romania
7.	Fabiane Hukuda	Brazil

==== 57 kg ====
Position	Judoka	Country
1.	Yurisleidis Lupetey	Cuba
2.	Deborah Gravenstijn	Netherlands
3.	Isabel Fernández	Spain
3.	Kie Kusakabe	Japan
5.	Cinzia Cavazzuti	Italy
5.	Xu Yuhua	China
7.	Tânia Ferreira	Brazil
7.	Marisabel Lomba	Belgium

==== 63 kg ====
Position	Judoka	Country
1.	Gella Vandecaveye	Belgium
2.	Sara Álvarez	Spain
3.	Anaisis Hernández	Cuba
3.	Ayumi Tanimoto	Japan
5.	Claudia Heill	Austria
5.	Urška Žolnir	Slovenia
7.	Vânia Ishii	Brazil
7.	Ylenia Scapin	Italy

==== 70 kg ====
Position	Judoka	Country
1.	Masae Ueno	Japan
2.	Kate Howey	Great Britain
3.	Regla Leyén	Cuba
3.	Ulla Werbrouck	Belgium
5.	Amina Abdellatif	France
5.	Cecilia Blanco	Spain
7.	Lea Blavo	Ivory Coast
7.	Kim Mi-jung	South Korea

==== 78 kg ====
Position	Judoka	Country
1.	Noriko Anno	Japan
2.	Yurisel Laborde	Cuba
3.	Céline Lebrun	France
3.	Lee So-yeon	South Korea
5.	Uta Kühnen	Germany
5.	Claudia Zwiers	Netherlands
7.	Michelle Rogers	Great Britain
7.	Esther San Miguel	Spain

==== +78 kg ====
Position	Judoka	Country
1.	Yuan Hua	China
2.	Midori Shintani	Japan
3.	Daima Beltrán	Cuba
3.	Sandra Köppen	Germany
5.	Karina Bryant	Great Britain
5.	Marie Elisabeth Veys	Belgium
7.	Tsvetana Bozhilova	Bulgaria
7.	Françoise Harteveld	Netherlands

==== Open class ====
Position	Judoka	Country
1.	Céline Lebrun	France
2.	Karina Bryant	Great Britain
3.	Catarina Rodrigues	Portugal
3.	Tong Wen	China
5.	Katja Gerber	Germany
5.	Priscila Marques	Brazil
7.	Françoise Harteveld	Netherlands
7.	Anastasiya Matrosova	Ukraine
