= Robertas Rimas =

Lithuanian judoka (born 1971)

Robertas Rimas (born 5 July 1971) is a Lithuanian retired judoka.

== Achievements ==
Year	Tournament	Place	Weight class
1999	European Judo Championships	5th	Half middleweight (81 kg)

== See also ==
- European Judo Championships
- List of judoka
