= Judo Grand Slam in Russia =

Judo tournaments in Russia

Locations of the Grand Slam Tournaments in Russia

The Grand Slam Tournament in Russia is a judo tournament in Russia. It was the third Judo Grand Slam tournament in the annual calendar.

The Grand Slam tournament took place from 2009 to 2021 and followed the World Cup tournament in Moscow, which has been held since 1996. It was held in Moscow from 2009 to 2013, in Tyumen from 2014 to 2016 and in Yekaterinburg from 2017 to 2019. Kazan was the venue in 2021.

== Grand Slam 2009 ==
The first Grand Slam tournament in Moscow took place on May 30 and 31, 2009. Alexander Mikhailin secured the only Russian victory in the heavyweight division.

Weight class	Men	Women
Extra-lightweight	Howhannes Dawtjan	Tomoko Fukumi
Half-lightweight	Chaschbaataryn Tsagaanbaatar	Misato Nakamura
Lightweight	Wang Ki-chun	Kaori Matsumoto
Half-middleweight	Siarhei Shundzikau	Marielle Pruvost
Middleweight	Takashi Ono	Yoriko Kunihara
Half-heavyweight	Hwang Hee-tae	Yang Xiuli
Heavyweight	Alexander Michailin	Maki Tsukada

== Grand Slam 2010 ==
The second Grand Slam tournament in Moscow took place on July 3 and 4, 2010. Two winners came from Russia: Musa Mogushkov and Ivan Nifontov.

Weight class	Men	Women
Extra-lightweight	Rishod Sobirov	Emi Yamagishi
Half-lightweight	Musa Mogushkov	Yuka Nishida
Lightweight	Benjamin Darbelet	Sabrina Filzmoser
Half-middleweight	Iwan Nifontow	Gévrise Émane
Middleweight	Takashi Ono	Anett Mészáros
Half-heavyweight	Luciano Corrêa	Yang Xiuli
Heavyweight	Islam El-Shehaby	Maki Tsukada

== Grand Slam 2011 ==
The third Grand Slam tournament in Moscow took place from May 27 to 29, 2011. Alim Gadanov was the only Russian winner.

Weight class	Men	Women
Extra-lightweight	Rishod Sobirov	Tomoko Fukumi
Half-lightweight	Alim Gadanow	Mönkhbaataryn Bundmaa
Lightweight	Dex Elmont	Aiko Satō
Half-middleweight	Sven Maresch	Urška Žolnir
Middleweight	Ilias Iliadis	Edith Bosch
Half-heavyweight	Ariel Zeevi	Akari Ogata
Heavyweight	Kim Soo-whan	Tong Wen

== Grand Slam 2012 ==
The fourth Grand Slam tournament in Moscow took place on May 26 and 27, 2012. Murat Khabachirov was the only Russian winner.

Weight class	Men	Women
Extra-lightweight	Naohisa Takato	Sarah Menezes
Half-lightweight	Mirzohid Farmonov	Érika Miranda
Lightweight	Yuki Nishiyama	Corina Stefan
Half-middleweight	Murat Khabachirov	Alice Schlesinger
Middleweight	Ilias Iliadis	Maria Portela
Half-heavyweight	Ramziddin Sayidov	Amy Cotton
Heavyweight	Abdullo Tangriev	Maria Suelen Altheman

== Grand Slam 2013 ==
The fifth Grand Slam tournament in Moscow took place on July 20 and 21, 2013. Grigory Sulemin was the only Russian winner.

Weight class	Men	Women
Extra-lightweight	Amiran Papinaschwili	Sarah Menezes
Half-lightweight	Charles Chibana	Jaana Sundberg
Lightweight	Dirk Van Tichelt	Miryam Roper
Half-middleweight	Sven Maresch	Yarden Gerbi
Middleweight	Grigorii Sulemin	Bernadette Graf
Half-heavyweight	Javad Mahjoub	Abigél Joó
Heavyweight	Robert Zimmermann	Maria Suelen Altheman

== Grand Slam 2014 ==
The first Grand Slam tournament in Tyumen took place on July 12 and 13, 2014. Denis Yartsev was the only Russian winner.

Weight class	Men	Women
Extra-lightweight	Shinji Kido	Sarah Menezes
Half-lightweight	Charles Chibana	Misato Nakamura
Lightweight	Denis Jarzew	Catherine Beauchemin-Pinard
Half-middleweight	Victor Penalber	Kana Abe
Middleweight	Yuya Yoshida	Kim Polling
Half-heavyweight	Elmar Qasımov	Mayra Aguiar
Heavyweight	Rafael Silva	Kanae Yamabe

== Grand Slam 2015 ==
The second Grand Slam tournament in Tyumen took place on July 18 and 19, 2015. There were two Russian winners, Uali Kurtsev and Ivan Vorobyov.

Weight class	Men	Frauen
Extra-lightweight	Shinji Kido	Julia Figueroa
Half-lightweight	Tomofumi Takajo	Joana Ramos
Lightweight	Uali Kurtsew	Tsukasa Yoshida
Half-middleweight	Iwan Worobjow	Munkhzaya Tsedevsuren
Middleweight	Mashu Baker	Haruka Tachimoto
Half-heavyweight	Martin Pacek	Guusje Steenhuis
Heavyweight	Hisayoshi Harasawa	Ma Sisi

== Grand Slam 2016 ==
The third Grand Slam tournament in Tyumen took place on July 16 and 17, 2016. With Musa Mogushkow, Aslan Lappinagow and Andrei Volkov there were three Russian winners for the first time. All women's competitions were won by Japanese women.

Weight class	Men	Frauen
Extra-lightweight	Yuma Oshima	Funa Tonaki
Half-lightweight	Hifumi Abe	Ai Shishime
Lightweight	Musa Moguschkow	Tsukasa Yoshida
Half-middleweight	Aslan Lappinagow	Aimi Nouchi
Middleweight	Marcus Nyman	Chizuru Arai
Half-heavyweight	Martin Pacek	Rika Takayama
Heavyweight	Andrei Wolkow	Nami Inamori

== Grand Slam 2017 ==
The first Grand Slam tournament in Yekaterinburg took place on May 20 and 21, 2017. Abdula Abdulzhalilov and Chassan Chalmursajew ensured victories for the team from the host country.

Weight class	Men	Frauen
Extra-lightweight	Ryūju Nagayama	Ami Kondo
Half-lightweight	Abdula Abdulzhalilov	Érika Miranda
Lightweight	Soichi Hashimoto	Miryam Roper
Half-middleweight	Chassan Chalmursajew	Martyna Trajdos
Middleweight	Kenta Nagasawa	Sanne Van Dijke
Half-heavyweight	Miklós Cirjenics	Mami Umeki
Heavyweight	David Moura	Sarah Asahina

== Grand Slam 2018 ==
The second Grand Slam tournament in Yekaterinburg took place on May 17 and 18, 2018. Natalia Kusyutina and Nijas Ilyasov were the Russian winners, with Kusyutina being the first Russian winner at the Grand Slam tournament in Russia.

Weight class	Men	Frauen
Extra-lightweight	Jeldos Smetow	Hiromi Endo
Half-lightweight	Hifumi Abe	Natalja Kusjutina
Lightweight	Tsend-Otschiryn Tsogtbaatar	Telma Monteiro
Half-middleweight	Sōtarō Fujiwara	Aimi Nouchi
Middleweight	Aleksandar Kukolj	Maria Portela
Half-heavyweight	Nijas Iljassow	Rika Takayama
Heavyweight	Hyoga Ota	Larisa Cerić

== Grand Slam 2019 ==
The third Grand Slam tournament in Yekaterinburg took place from March 15 to 17, 2019. Darya Davydova, Arman Adamjan and Tamerlan Bashayev were the Russian winners.

Weight class	Men	Frauen
Extra-lightweight	Unubold Lkhagvajamts	Paula Pareto
Half-lightweight	Kilian Le Blouch	Gili Cohen
Lightweight	Tommy Macias	Christa Deguchi
Half-middleweight	Sagi Muki	Darja Dawydowa
Middleweight	Noël van ’t End	Marie-Ève Gahié
Half-heavyweight	Arman Adamjan	Mao Izumi
Heavyweight	Tamerlan Baschajew	Maria Suelen Altheman

== Grand Slam 2020 (canceled) ==
The Grand Slam tournament in Yekaterinburg was scheduled to take place on March 13 and 14, 2020. It was canceled due to the COVID-19 pandemic.

== Grand Slam 2021 ==
The Grand Slam tournament in Kazan took place from May 5 to 7, 2021.

Weight class	Men	Frauen
Extra-lightweight	Luchum Tschchwimiani	Funa Tonaki
Half-lightweight	Murad Chopanov	Uta Abe
Lightweight	Makhmadbek Makhmadbekov	Hélène Receveaux
Half-middleweight	Attila Ungvari	Agata Ozdoba
Middleweight	Sanshiro Murao	Madina Taimasowa
Half-heavyweight	Simeon Catharina	Anna-Maria Wagner
Heavyweight	Tamerlan Baschajew	Romane Dicko

== Grand Slam 2022 (canceled) ==
In 2022, Russia was excluded from all judo events because of the war of aggression against Ukraine and was therefore not allowed to hold a Grand Slam tournament.
