= Deborah Allan =

British judoka (born 1975)

Personal information
- Nationality: British
- Born: 21 July 1975 (age 51)
- Occupation: Judoka

Sport
- Sport: Judo
- Weight class: –52 kg
- Club: Camberley Judo Club
Medal record
Representing Great Britain
European Judo Championships
| Bronze medal – third place | 1994 Gdańsk | -52 kg |
| Silver medal – second place | 1998 Oviedo | -57 kg |
| Gold medal – first place | 1999 Bratislava | -52 kg |

Profile at external databases
- JudoInside.com: 298

Deborah "Debbie" Allan (born 21 July 1975) is a former British judoka. She won three European Championship medals, including a gold at the 1999 European Judo Championships. Allan was scheduled to compete at the 2000 Summer Olympics, but was disqualified at the weigh-in for being over the weight limit.

== Career ==
Allan is from Camberley, Surrey, England, and trained at the Camberley Judo Club. In 1993, she became champion of Great Britain, winning the featherweight division at the British Judo Championships. The following year in 1994, she won a bronze medal at the 1994 European Judo Championships and retained her British title. Also in 1994, she was involved in a row with coach Mark Earle, which led to him being temporarily suspended by British Judo.

In 1995, she won her third consecutive British featherweight title. Her next major success came when she won a silver medal at the 1998 European Judo Championships before winning the gold medal at the 1999 European Judo Championships, defeating Paula Saldanha in the gold medal match.

Allan qualified for the under 52 kg event at the 2000 Summer Olympics, but was 400 grams (0.88 lb) over the weight limit at the weigh-in. Her coach Diane Bell cut Allan's hair and made her stand naked on the weighing scales. Allan was still 100 grams (0.22 lb) above the weight limit, and so was disqualified from the event. She was banned by the British Judo selection panel for six months, although she was back in the British team after the ban was later overturned on appeal.
