= Daniel Hernandes =

Brazilian judoka (born 1979)

Personal information
- Full name: Daniel Andrey Hernandes
- Born: 16 April 1979 (age 47) São Paulo
- Occupation: Judoka

Sport
- Country: Brazil
- Sport: Judo
- Weight class: +100 kg

Achievements and titles
- Olympic Games: 9th (2000, 2004)
- World Champ.: 5th (1999, 2001, 2003, 2007, 2009)
- Pan American Champ.: (2002, 2002, 2003, 2006, 2007)
Medal record
Men's judo
Representing Brazil
Pan American Games
Gold medal – first place	2003 Santo Domingo	+100 kg
Silver medal – second place	1999 Winnipeg	+100 kg
Pan American Championships
Gold medal – first place	2002 Santo Domingo	+100 kg
Gold medal – first place	2002 Santo Domingo	Open
Gold medal – first place	2003 Salvador	+100 kg
Gold medal – first place	2006 Buenos Aires	+100 kg
Gold medal – first place	2007 Montreal	+100 kg
Silver medal – second place	2004 Isla Margarita	+100 kg
Silver medal – second place	2010 San Salvador	+100 kg
Bronze medal – third place	1998 Santo Domingo	+100 kg
IJF Grand Slam
Gold medal – first place	2009 Rio de Janeiro	+100 kg
Silver medal – second place	2011 Rio de Janeiro	+100 kg
Bronze medal – third place	2012 Rio de Janeiro	+100 kg
IJF Grand Prix
Silver medal – second place	2010 Qingdao	+100 kg
South American Games
Gold medal – first place	2002 Rio de Janeiro	Open
World Juniors Championships
Bronze medal – third place	1998 Cali	+100 kg
Pan American Junior Championships
Gold medal – first place	1998 Maracaibo	+100 kg

Profile at external databases
- IJF: 435
- JudoInside.com: 695
- Updated on 3 June 2022

Daniel Andrey Hernandes (born 16 April 1979 in São Paulo) is a male judoka from Brazil. He won the gold medal in the heavyweight division (+100 kg) at the 2003 Pan American Games. In the final, he defeated Haiti's Joel Brutus. He represented his native country at two consecutive Summer Olympics (2000 and 2004).
