= Houda Ben Daya =

Tunisian judoka (born 1979)

Personal information
- Full name: Houda Ben Daya
- Nationality: Tunisia
- Born: 21 July 1979 (age 46) Tunis, Tunisia
- Occupation: Judoka
- Height: 1.75 m (5 ft 9 in)
- Weight: 77 kg (170 lb)

Sport
- Sport: Judo
- Event: 78 kg
Medal record
Women's judo
Representing Tunisia
Mediterranean Games
Bronze medal – third place	2001 Tunis	78 kg

Profile at external databases
- JudoInside.com: 11864

Houda Ben Daya (Arabic: هدى بن داية; born July 21, 1979, in Tunis) is a Tunisian judoka, who competed in the women's half-heavyweight category. She picked up a total of five medals, including three golds from the African Championships and a bronze from the 2001 Mediterranean Games in her native Tunis, and represented her nation Tunisia in the 78-kg class at the 2004 Summer Olympics.

Ben Daya qualified for the Tunisian squad in the women's half-heavyweight class (78 kg) at the 2004 Summer Olympics in Athens, by topping the field of judoka and receiving a berth from the African Championships in her native Tunis. She lost her opening match to Brazil's Edinanci Silva, who scored an ippon victory and overpowered her on the tatami with an uchi mata (inner thigh throw) at three minutes and eighteen seconds.
