= Katja Gerber =

German judoka (born 1975)

Personal information
- Born: 13 December 1975 (age 50)
- Occupation: Judoka

Sport
- Country: Germany
- Sport: Judo
- Weight class: +78 kg, Open

Achievements and titles
- World Champ.: 5th (2001)
- European Champ.: (gold) (1999, 2000, 2001, 2002)
Medal record
Women's judo
Representing Germany
European Championships
Gold medal – first place	1999 Bratislava	Open
Gold medal – first place	2000 Wrocław	Open
Gold medal – first place	2001 Paris	+78 kg
Gold medal – first place	2002 Maribor	Open
Bronze medal – third place	1998 Oviedo	Open
Summer Universiade
Silver medal – second place	1998 Prague	Open

Profile at external databases
- IJF: 58493
- JudoInside.com: 230
- Updated on 9 May 2024

Katja Gerber (born 13 December 1975) is a German judoka.

== Achievements ==
Year	Tournament	Place	Weight class
2002	European Championships	1st	Open class
2001	World Championships	5th	Open class
2001	European Championships	1st	Heavyweight (+78 kg)
2000	European Championships	1st	Open class
1999	European Championships	1st	Open class
1998	European Championships	3rd	Open class
