= Judo Grand Slam in Germany =

Judo competition

Location of the Grand Slam Düsseldorf

The Grand Slam tournament in Düsseldorf is a judo tournament in Düsseldorf. It is the only Judo Grand Slam tournament in Germany.

The Grand Prix tournament was held in Düsseldorf for the first time in 2010; it was the successor tournament to the Hamburg Grand Prix tournament. In 2018 the event was upgraded to a Grand Slam competition. There was no Grand Slam tournament in Düsseldorf in 2021 due to the COVID-19 pandemic. In 2022, the event was planned for June, but was canceled early.

== Past winners ==
=== Men's ===
Year	−60 kg	−66 kg	−73 kg	−81 kg	−90 kg	−100 kg	+100 kg	Ref.
as Grand Prix Hamburg
2009	(Uzbekistan) Rishod Sobirov	(South Korea) Kim Joo-jin	(Russia) Mansur Isaev	(Russia) Sirazhudin Magomedov	(France) Yves-Matthieu Dafreville	(Japan) Takamasa Anai	(Uzbekistan) Abdullo Tangriev	
as Grand Prix Düsseldorf
2010	(Ukraine) Georgii Zantaraia	(Mongolia) Khashbaataryn Tsagaanbaatar	(Mongolia) Sainjargalyn Nyam-Ochir	(South Korea) Kim Jae-bum	(Japan) Yuya Yoshida	(Japan) Takamasa Anai	(Egypt) Islam El Shehaby	
2011	(Japan) Hiroaki Hiraoka	(Japan) Masaaki Fukuoka	(Belgium) Dirk Van Tichelt	(United States) Travis Stevens	(Sweden) Marcus Nyman	(Kazakhstan) Maxim Rakov	(Germany) Andreas Tölzer	
2012	(South Korea) Jin-Min Jang	(Russia) Alim Gadanov	(South Korea) Wang Ki-chun	(Germany) Ole Bischof	(Georgia (country)) Varlam Liparteliani	(Kazakhstan) Maxim Rakov	(Germany) Andreas Tölzer	
2013	(Mongolia) Ganbatyn Boldbaatar	(Japan) Masashi Ebinuma	(France) Pierre Duprat	(Georgia (country)) Avtandili Tchrikishvili	(Georgia (country)) Varlam Liparteliani	(France) Cyrille Maret	(Japan) Masaru Momose	
2014	(Japan) Toru Shishime	(Japan) Masashi Ebinuma	(Japan) Hiroyuki Akimoto	(United States) Travis Stevens	(Greece) Ilias Iliadis	(Brazil) Luciano Corrêa	(Japan) Daiki Kamikawa	
2015	(Japan) Toru Shishime	(Japan) Kengo Takaichi	(Japan) Shohei Ono	(Belgium) Joachim Bottieau	(Georgia (country)) Varlam Liparteliani	(Japan) Ryunosuke Haga	(Japan) Ryu Shichinohe	
2016	(South Korea) Kim Won-jin	(South Korea) An Ba-ul	(Japan) Shohei Ono	(Belgium) Joachim Bottieau	(Sweden) Marcus Nyman	(Germany) Dimitri Peters	(Ukraine) Iakiv Khammo	
2017	(Mongolia) Ganbatyn Boldbaatar	(Georgia (country)) Vazha Margvelashvili	(Russia) Denis Iartsev	(Russia) Aslan Lappinagov	(Georgia (country)) Beka Gviniashvili	(Belgium) Toma Nikiforov	(Japan) Kokoro Kageura	
as Grand Slam Düsseldorf
2018	(Japan) Ryuju Nagayama	(Japan) Kenzo Tagawa	(Japan) Shohei Ono	(Iran) Saeid Mollaei	(Russia) Mikhail Igolnikov	(Georgia (country)) Varlam Liparteliani	Not awarded	
2019	(Japan) Ryuju Nagayama	(Japan) Joshiro Maruyama	(Japan) Shohei Ono	(Japan) Sotaro Fujiwara	(Azerbaijan) Mammadali Mehdiyev	(Japan) Kentaro Iida	(Japan) Hisayoshi Harasawa	
2020	(Japan) Naohisa Takato	(Japan) Hifumi Abe	(Japan) Shohei Ono	(Georgia (country)) Tato Grigalashvili	(Uzbekistan) Davlat Bobonov	(Uzbekistan) Mukhammadkarim Khurramov	(Georgia (country)) Guram Tushishvili	

=== Women's ===
Year	−48 kg	−52 kg	−57 kg	−63 kg	−70 kg	−78 kg	+78 kg	Ref.
as Grand Prix Hamburg
2009	(Japan) Tomoko Fukumi	(Japan) Misato Nakamura	(Portugal) Telma Monteiro	(Japan) Yoshie Ueno	(Japan) Mina Watanabe	(France) Céline Lebrun	(China) Liu Huanyuan	
as Grand Prix Düsseldorf
2010	(Japan) Tomoko Fukumi	(Algeria) Soraya Haddad	(Japan) Kaori Matsumoto	(Germany) Claudia Malzahn	(Japan) Mina Watanabe	(Germany) Heide Wollert	(Japan) Megumi Tachimoto	
2011	(Japan) Tomoko Fukumi	(Japan) Yuka Nishida	(Brazil) Rafaela Silva	(Japan) Yoshie Ueno	(China) Chen Fei	(Mongolia) Pürevjargalyn Lkhamdegd	(Japan) Mika Sugimoto	
2012	(Belgium) Charline Van Snick	(Japan) Yuki Hashimoto	(Japan) Kaori Matsumoto	(South Korea) Joung Da-woon	(Slovenia) Raša Sraka	(United States) Kayla Harrison	(Slovenia) Lucija Polavder	
2013	(Japan) Riho Okamoto	(Kosovo) Majlinda Kelmendi	(France) Automne Pavia	(France) Clarisse Agbegnenou	(Netherlands) Kim Polling	(United Kingdom) Gemma Gibbons	(Brazil) Maria Suelen Altheman	
2014	(China) Wu Shugen	(Russia) Natalia Kuziutina	(Japan) Kaori Matsumoto	(Russia) Marta Labazina	(Morocco) Assmaa Niang	(Germany) Luise Malzahn	(Japan) Megumi Tachimoto	
2015	(Belgium) Charline Van Snick	(China) Ma Yingnan	(Brazil) Rafaela Silva	(United Kingdom) Alice Schlesinger	(Japan) Chizuru Arai	(United States) Kayla Harrison	(Japan) Kanae Yamabe	
2016	(South Korea) Jeong Bo-kyeong	(Japan) Ai Shishime	(Japan) Kaori Matsumoto	(Slovenia) Tina Trstenjak	(Austria) Bernadette Graf	(France) Audrey Tcheuméo	(Brazil) Maria Suelen Altheman	
2017	(Japan) Funa Tonaki	(Japan) Uta Abe	(Germany) Theresa Stoll	(France) Clarisse Agbegnenou	(Japan) Chizuru Arai	(Japan) Mami Umeki	(Ukraine) Iryna Kindzerska	
as Grand Slam Düsseldorf
2018	(Ukraine) Daria Bilodid	(Japan) Ai Shishime	(United Kingdom) Nekoda Smythe-Davis	(Slovenia) Andreja Leški	(Japan) Yoko Ono	(Japan) Ruika Sato	(Japan) Sarah Asahina	
2019	(Japan) Funa Tonaki	(Kosovo) Majlinda Kelmendi	(Japan) Tsukasa Yoshida	(Japan) Miku Tashiro	(United Kingdom) Sally Conway	(Brazil) Mayra Aguiar	(Cuba) Idalys Ortiz	
2020	(France) Shirine Boukli	(Japan) Uta Abe	(Canada) Jessica Klimkait	(Japan) Miku Tashiro	(Japan) Chizuru Arai	(Japan) Shori Hamada	(Japan) Sarah Asahina	
