= Musa Nastuyev =

Russian-Ukrainian judoka (born 1976)

Personal information
- Born: 22 January 1976 (age 50)
- Occupation: Judoka

Sport
- Sport: Judo
Medal record
Men's judo
Representing Ukraine
World Championships
Silver medal – second place	2001 Munich	66 kg
European Championships
Bronze medal – third place	2002 Maribor	66 kg
Representing Russia
Summer Universiade
Silver medal – second place	1999 Palma de Mallorca	66 kg

Profile at external databases
- JudoInside.com: 593

Musa Muhamedovich Nastuyev (born January 22, 1976) is a Russian-Ukrainian judoka.

== Achievements ==
Year	Tournament	Place	Weight class
2004	European Judo Championships	5th	Half lightweight (66 kg)
2002	European Judo Championships	3rd	Half lightweight (66 kg)
2001	World Judo Championships	2nd	Half lightweight (66 kg)
1999	Summer Universiade	2nd	Half lightweight (66 kg)
