= Kimberly Ribble =

Canadian judoka

Personal information
- Born: 11 August 1974 (age 51) Hamilton, Ontario, Canada
- Occupation: Judoka

Sport
- Sport: Judo

Profile at external databases
- JudoInside.com: 857

Kimberly Ribble (born 11 August 1974) is a Canadian judoka. She competed in the women's half-heavyweight event at the 2000 Summer Olympics.

== See also ==
- Judo in Canada
- List of Canadian judoka
