= Uta Kühnen =

German judoka (born 1975)

Personal information
- Full name: Uta Kühnen
- Nationality: Germany
- Born: 9 August 1975 (age 51) Freiburg im Breisgau, Baden- Württemberg, West Germany
- Height: 1.78 m (5 ft 10 in)
- Weight: 75 kg (165 lb)

Sport
- Sport: Judo
- Event: 78 kg
- Club: SC Berlin
- Coached by: Norbert Littkopf
Medal record
Women's judo
Representing Germany
European Championships
| Bronze medal – third place | 2000 Wrocław | 78 kg |

Uta Kühnen (born 9 August 1975 in Freiburg im Breisgau, Baden-Württemberg) is a German judoka who competed in the women's half-heavyweight category. She held three German senior titles in her own division, picked up a total of twenty-nine medals in her career, including a bronze from the 2000 European Judo Championships in Wrocław, Poland, and represented Germany in two editions of the Olympic Games (2000 and 2004). Kuhnen also trained as a full-fledged member of the judo squad for the Berlin Sports Club under her personal coach and sensei Norbert Littkoff, who also headed the German national team.

Kuhnen made her official debut at the 2000 Summer Olympics in Sydney, where she competed for the German team in the women's half-heavyweight class (78 kg). She thwarted Gabon's Mélanie Engoang in a sudden-death prelim match, before falling short in her next bout to South Korea's Lee So-yeon, who threw her off the tatami with a double yuko score within four seconds.

At the 2004 Summer Olympics in Athens, Kuhnen qualified for her second German squad again in the women's half-heavyweight class (78 kg), by placing seventh from the World Championships in Osaka, Japan. Unlike her previous Olympics, Kuhnen received a bye in the first round, but slipped her medal chances with a shido penalty, a yuko score, and a kuchiki taoshi hold (single leg takedown) from Cuban judoka and eventual bronze medalist Yurisel Laborde during their second-round match.
