= Christina Yannetsos =

American judoka (born 1983)

Personal information
- Born: May 7, 1983 (age 43)
- Occupation: Judoka

Sport
- Sport: Judo
Medal record
Women's judo
Representing the United States
Pan American Games
Silver medal – second place	2003 Santo Domingo	Middleweight

Profile at external databases
- JudoInside.com: 13423

Christina Yannetsos (born May 7, 1983) is a female judoka from the United States, who won the silver medal in the women's middleweight division (– 70 kg) at the 2003 Pan American Games in Santo Domingo, Dominican Republic. In the final she was defeated by Cuba's Regla Leyén. Christina graduated from the Medical College of Wisconsin in 2012, and is now an Emergency Medicine physician.
