= Cédric Taymans =

Belgian judoka

Personal information
- Born: 11 April 1975 (age 51) Ixelles, Région de Bruxelles-Capitale, Belgium
- Occupation: Judoka

Sport
- Sport: Judo
Medal record
Men's judo
Representing Belgium
World Championships
Silver medal – second place	2001 Munich	60 kg
Bronze medal – third place	1997 Paris	60 kg
European Championships
Silver medal – second place	1999 Bratislava	60 kg
Bronze medal – third place	2000 Wroclaw	60 kg
Bronze medal – third place	2001 Paris	60 kg

Profile at external databases
- JudoInside.com: 192

Cédric Taymans (born 11 April 1975) is a Belgian judoka.

== Achievements ==
Year	Tournament	Place	Weight class
2005	European Judo Championships	5th	Extra lightweight (60 kg)
2003	European Judo Championships	7th	Extra lightweight (60 kg)
2002	European Judo Championships	5th	Extra lightweight (60 kg)
2001	World Judo Championships	2nd	Extra lightweight (60 kg)
2001	European Judo Championships	3rd	Extra lightweight (60 kg)
2000	European Judo Championships	3rd	Extra lightweight (60 kg)
1999	European Judo Championships	2nd	Extra lightweight (60 kg)
1997	World Judo Championships	3rd	Extra lightweight (60 kg)
