= Gintaras Ambraska =

Lithuanian judoka (born 1975)

Gintaras Ambraska (born 5 February 1975) is a Lithuanian judoka.

== Achievements ==
Year	Tournament	Place	Weight class
1999	European Judo Championships	5th	Half heavyweight (100 kg)
