= Brigitte Olivier =

Belgian judoka (born 1980)

Personal information
- Born: 20 January 1980 (age 46)
- Occupation: Judoka

Sport
- Sport: Judo
Medal record
Representing Belgium
Women's judo
European Championships
Silver medal – second place	1999 Bratislava	Open class
Bronze medal – third place	1997 Ostend	Open class
Bronze medal – third place	1999 Bratislava	+78 kg

Profile at external databases
- IJF: 53179
- JudoInside.com: 183

Brigitte Olivier (born 20 January 1980) is a Belgian judoka. She competed in the women's heavyweight event at the 2000 Summer Olympics.

== Achievements ==
Year	Tournament	Place	Weight class
2003	European Championships	7th	Open class
2002	European Championships	7th	Heavyweight (+78 kg)
2001	European Championships	7th	Open class
2000	European Championships	7th	Heavyweight (+78 kg)
1999	European Championships	3rd	Heavyweight (+78 kg)
1999	European Championships	2nd	Open class
1999	World Championships	5th	Heavyweight (+78 kg)
1998	European Championships	7th	Heavyweight (+78 kg)
1998	European Championships	7th	Open class
1997	European Championships	3rd	Open class
1997	World Championships	7th	Heavyweight (+72 kg)
