= Natalie Jenkinson =

Australian judoka (born 1976)

Personal information
- Nationality: Australian
- Born: 18 November 1976 (age 48); Gladstone, Queensland, Australia

Sport
- Sport: Judo

Natalie Jenkinson (born 18 November 1976) is an Australian judoka. She competed in the women's half-heavyweight event at the 2000 Summer Olympics.

== Early life ==
Jenkinson comes from a family of boxers. Her brothers, father and grandfather all boxed, but at age 11, Jenkinson began training in Judo.

== Career ==
Jenkinson qualified for the Australian Judo Team, and competed in the 2000 Summer Olympics in the women's half-heavyweight event. After the Olympics, Jenkinson changed to coaching and competing in athletics, and trained masters athletics competitors Michael Curran and Hughie Thomsen. At the Queensland Country Athletics Championships, held at the University of the Sunshine Coast in April 2006, Jenkinson entered the women's 20-plus throwing events and won silver in the discus throw, gold in the javelin throw and gold in the shot put.

Jenkinson also competed in Boxing and won four Australian Titles. On 31 March 2012, Jenkinson, then of the Pacific Club from Redland Bay, defeated Katrina Harvey to win an Australian title fight at King's Theatre at the Warwick RSL Memorial Club.

In August 2016, at age 40, Jenkinson was a coach at the Hit House Boxing Club at Bli Bli, Queensland. Some of her team participated in the National Golden Gloves (Australia's amateur boxing championships), held at the Acacia Ridge Tavern, Brisbane.
