= Hsu Yuan-lin =

Taiwanese judoka

Personal information
- Nationality: Taiwanese
- Born: 3 June 1971 (age 53)
- Occupation: Judoka

Sport
- Sport: Judo

Hsu Yuan-lin (born 3 June 1971) is a Taiwanese judoka. She competed in the women's half-heavyweight event at the 2000 Summer Olympics.
