= 1998 World Judo Juniors Championships =

Judo competition

Judo 1998 World Judo Juniors Championships
- Location: Cali, Colombia
- Dates: 8–11 October 1998

Competition at external databases
- Links: JudoInside

The 1998 World Judo Juniors Championships was an edition of the World Judo Juniors Championships, organised by the International Judo Federation. It was held in Cali, Colombia from 8 to 11 October 1998.

== Medal summary ==
=== Men's events ===
Event	Gold	Silver	Bronze
Extra-lightweight (−60 kg)	Yordanis Arencibia (CUB)	Evgeny Stanev (RUS)	Choi Min-ho (KOR)
Extra-lightweight (−60 kg)	Yordanis Arencibia (CUB)	Evgeny Stanev (RUS)	Ehud Vaks (ISR)
Half-lightweight (−66 kg)	Tiago Camilo (BRA)	Nicolae Ivan (ROU)	Javier Delgado (ESP)
Half-lightweight (−66 kg)	Tiago Camilo (BRA)	Nicolae Ivan (ROU)	Vladislav Garanin (RUS)
Lightweight (−73 kg)	Denis Ogienko (RUS)	Germán Velasco (PER)	Claudiu Baștea (ROU)
Lightweight (−73 kg)	Denis Ogienko (RUS)	Germán Velasco (PER)	Klemen Ferjan (SLO)
Half-middleweight (−81 kg)	Alexei Cherchnev (RUS)	Thomas Cousins (GBR)	Takashi Ono (JPN)
Half-middleweight (−81 kg)	Alexei Cherchnev (RUS)	Thomas Cousins (GBR)	Tim Lamsfuß (GER)
Middleweight (−90 kg)	Yuta Yazaki (JPN)	Muslim Gadzhimagomedov (RUS)	Elco van der Geest (NED)
Middleweight (−90 kg)	Yuta Yazaki (JPN)	Muslim Gadzhimagomedov (RUS)	Rupert Riess (AUT)
Half-heavyweight (−100 kg)	Keiji Suzuki (JPN)	Rafael Rocha (BRA)	Michael Jurack (GER)
Half-heavyweight (−100 kg)	Keiji Suzuki (JPN)	Rafael Rocha (BRA)	Martin Padar (EST)
Heavyweight (+100 kg)	Alexander Mikhaylin (RUS)	Yasuyuki Muneta (JPN)	Grzegorz Eitel (POL)
Heavyweight (+100 kg)	Alexander Mikhaylin (RUS)	Yasuyuki Muneta (JPN)	Daniel Hernandes (BRA)

=== Women's events ===
Event	Gold	Silver	Bronze
Extra-lightweight (−48 kg)	Danieska Carrión (CUB)	Asami Kuramochi (JPN)	Anna Żemła-Krajewska (POL)
Extra-lightweight (−48 kg)	Danieska Carrión (CUB)	Asami Kuramochi (JPN)	Ann Simons (BEL)
Half-lightweight (−52 kg)	Zaimaris Calderon (CUB)	Fabiane Hukuda (BRA)	Viktória Nagy (HUN)
Half-lightweight (−52 kg)	Zaimaris Calderon (CUB)	Fabiane Hukuda (BRA)	Ana Carrascosa (ESP)
Lightweight (−57 kg)	Yuko Nesaki (JPN)	Danielle Zangrando (BRA)	Lena Göldi (SUI)
Lightweight (−57 kg)	Yuko Nesaki (JPN)	Danielle Zangrando (BRA)	Yurisleidy Lupetey (CUB)
Half-middleweight (−63 kg)	Keiko Maeda (JPN)	Claudia Heill (AUT)	Raša Sraka (SLO)
Half-middleweight (−63 kg)	Keiko Maeda (JPN)	Claudia Heill (AUT)	Betty Aguila (CUB)
Middleweight (−70 kg)	Yukie Koga (JPN)	Catherine Jacques (BEL)	Edith Bosch (NED)
Middleweight (−70 kg)	Yukie Koga (JPN)	Catherine Jacques (BEL)	Yurisel Laborde (CUB)
Half-heavyweight (−78 kg)	Leyén Zulueta (CUB)	Mizuho Matzuzaki (JPN)	Henar Parra (ESP)
Half-heavyweight (−78 kg)	Leyén Zulueta (CUB)	Mizuho Matzuzaki (JPN)	Jana Grenzdorfer (GER)
Heavyweight (+78 kg)	Karina Bryant (GBR)	Choi Sook-ie (KOR)	Sanae Yokomizo (JPN)
Heavyweight (+78 kg)	Karina Bryant (GBR)	Choi Sook-ie (KOR)	Lee Hsiao-hung (TPE)

Source Results

=== Medal table ===
* Host nation (Colombia)

Rank	Nation	Gold	Silver	Bronze	Total
1	Japan (JPN)	5	3	2	10
2	Cuba (CUB)	4	0	3	7
3	Russia (RUS)	3	2	1	6
4	Brazil (BRA)	1	3	1	5
5	Great Britain (GBR)	1	1	0	2
6	Austria (AUT)	0	1	1	2
6	Belgium (BEL)	0	1	1	2
6	Romania (ROU)	0	1	1	2
6	South Korea (KOR)	0	1	1	2
10	Peru (PER)	0	1	0	1
11	Germany (GER)	0	0	3	3
11	Spain (ESP)	0	0	3	3
13	Netherlands (NED)	0	0	2	2
13	Poland (POL)	0	0	2	2
13	Slovenia (SLO)	0	0	2	2
16	Chinese Taipei (TPE)	0	0	1	1
16	Estonia (EST)	0	0	1	1
16	Hungary (HUN)	0	0	1	1
16	Israel (ISR)	0	0	1	1
16	Switzerland (SUI)	0	0	1	1
Totals (20 entries)		14	14	28	56
