= Koen van Nol =

Dutch judoka (born 1974)

Koen van Nol (born 20 January 1974, in Amsterdam) is a Dutch judoka.

== Achievements ==
Year	Tournament	Place	Weight class
1999	European Judo Championships	7th	Lightweight (73 kg)
1997	World Judo Championships	7th	Lightweight (71 kg)
