= Akissi Monney =

Ivorian judoka

Personal information
- Nationality: Ivorian
- Born: 25 August 1979 (age 45)

Sport
- Sport: Judo

Akissi Monney (born 25 August 1979) is an Ivorian judoka. She competed in the women's half-heavyweight event at the 2000 Summer Olympics.
