= Anastasiia Matrosova =

Ukrainian judoka

Personal information
- Born: 3 January 1982 (age 44)
- Occupation: Judoka

Sport
- Country: Ukraine
- Sport: Judo
- Weight class: –78 kg

Achievements and titles
- Olympic Games: 5th (2004)
- World Champ.: 7th (2001)
- European Champ.: (bronze) (2000, 2002, 2004, 2005)
Medal record
Women's judo
Representing Ukraine
European Championships
Bronze medal – third place	2000 Wrocław	–78 kg
Bronze medal – third place	2002 Maribor	–78 kg
Bronze medal – third place	2004 Bucharest	–78 kg
Bronze medal – third place	2005 Rotterdam	–78 kg
IJF Grand Prix
Bronze medal – third place	2009 Tunis	–78 kg
European U23 Championships
Gold medal – first place	2004 Ljubljana	–78 kg
World Juniors Championships
Gold medal – first place	2000 Nabeul	–78 kg
European Junior Championships
Gold medal – first place	1996 Monte Carlo	+72 kg
Gold medal – first place	1999 Rome	–78 kg
Bronze medal – third place	1998 Bucharest	–78 kg
Bronze medal – third place	2001 Budapest	–78 kg

Profile at external databases
- IJF: 2028
- JudoInside.com: 373
- Updated on 23 February 2022

Anastasiia Matrosova (born January 3, 1982, Kyiv) is a Ukrainian judoka.

She finished in joint fifth place in the half-heavyweight (78 kg) division at the 2004 Summer Olympics, having lost the bronze medal match to Lucia Morico of Italy.
