= Sergio Doménech =

Spanish judoka (born 1976)

Sergio Doménech (born 1 January 1976) is a Spanish judoka.

== Achievements ==
Year	Tournament	Place	Weight class
1999	European Judo Championships	7th	Half middleweight (81 kg)
