= Yurisel Laborde =

Cuban judoka (born 1979)

Personal information
- Full name: Yurisel Laborde Duanes
- Born: 18 August 1979 (age 46)
- Occupation: Judoka

Sport
- Country: Cuba
- Sport: Judo
- Weight class: ‍–‍78 kg

Achievements and titles
- Olympic Games: (bronze) (2004)
- World Champ.: (2005, 2007)
- Pan American Champ.: (2001, 2002, 2008)
Medal record
Women's judo
Representing Cuba
Olympic Games
Bronze medal – third place	2004 Athens	‍–‍78 kg
World Championships
Gold medal – first place	2005 Cairo	‍–‍78 kg
Gold medal – first place	2007 Rio de Janeiro	‍–‍78 kg
Silver medal – second place	2001 Munich	‍–‍78 kg
Silver medal – second place	2003 Osaka	‍–‍78 kg
Pan American Games
Silver medal – second place	2003 Santo Domingo	‍–‍78 kg
Silver medal – second place	2007 Rio de Janeiro	‍–‍78 kg
Pan American Championships
Gold medal – first place	2001 Cordoba	‍–‍78 kg
Gold medal – first place	2002 Santo Domingo	‍–‍78 kg
Gold medal – first place	2008 Miami	‍–‍78 kg
Silver medal – second place	2007 Montreal	‍–‍78 kg
Bronze medal – third place	2006 Buenos Aires	‍–‍78 kg
World Juniors Championships
Bronze medal – third place	1998 Cali	‍–‍70 kg
Central American and Caribbean Games
Gold medal – first place	2006 Cartagena	‍–‍78 kg
Gold medal – first place	2006 Cartagena	Women's team

Profile at external databases
- IJF: 53025
- JudoInside.com: 974
- Updated on 9 May 2024

Yurisel Laborde Duanes (born 18 August 1979) is a judoka from Cuba. At the 2004 Summer Olympics she won a bronze medal in the women's Half Heavyweight (‍–‍78 kg) category, together with Lucia Morico of Italy. At the 2005 and 2007 World Championships Laborde won a gold medals in the same class.
