= Mika Mäkelä =

Finnish judoka (born 1971)

Mika Mäkelä (born 17 April 1971) is a Finnish judoka. He has had more success on national than international level achieving several medals in championship tournaments for senior judokas.

== Achievements ==
| Year | Tournament | Place | Weight class |
|---|---|---|---|
| 1999 | European Judo Championships | 7th | Lightweight (73 kg) |
