= Leyén Zulueta =

Cuban judoka (born 1979)

Personal information
- Born: 3 November 1979 (age 46)
- Occupation: Judoka

Sport
- Country: Cuba
- Sport: Judo
- Weight class: –70 kg

Achievements and titles
- World Champ.: (silver) (2003)
- Pan American Champ.: (2001)
Medal record
Women's judo
Representing Cuba
World Championships
Silver medal – second place	2003 Osaka	–70 kg
Bronze medal – third place	2001 Munich	–70 kg
Pan American Games
Gold medal – first place	2003 Santo Domingo	–70 kg
Pan American Championships
Gold medal – first place	2001 Cordoba	–70 kg
Bronze medal – third place	1996 San Juan	–72 kg
World Juniors Championships
Gold medal – first place	1998 Cali	–78 kg
Summer Universiade
Bronze medal – third place	2001 Beijing	–70 kg

Profile at external databases
- IJF: 57229
- JudoInside.com: 14767
- Updated on 19 November 2022

Regla Leyén Zulueta (born 3 November 1979) is a female judoka from Cuba, who won the gold medal in the women's middleweight division (– 70 kg) at the 2003 Pan American Games in Santo Domingo, Dominican Republic. In the final she defeated USA's Christina Yannetsos. In 2003, she immigrated to United States and in 2010 she became a U.S. citizen.
