= Liu Xia (judoka) =

Chinese judoka (born 1979)

Personal information
- Born: 6 January 1979 (age 47)
- Occupation: Judoka

Sport
- Country: China
- Sport: Judo
- Weight class: –78 kg

Achievements and titles
- Olympic Games: (silver) (2004)
- Asian Champ.: (gold) (2007)
Medal record
Women's judo
Representing China
Olympic Games
Silver medal – second place	2004 Athens	‍–‍78 kg
Asian Championships
Gold medal – first place	2007 Kuwait City	‍–‍78 kg
Silver medal – second place	2004 Almaty	‍–‍78 kg
Summer Universiade
Gold medal – first place	2003 Jeju	+78 kg

Profile at external databases
- IJF: 53019
- JudoInside.com: 931
- Updated on 31 May 2023

Liu Xia (simplified Chinese: 刘霞; traditional Chinese: 劉霞; pinyin: Liú Xiá; born 6 January 1979 in Qingdao) is a Chinese judoka. She was the silver medalist in the ‍–‍78 kg category at the 2004 Athens Olympics. She was the 2003 Summer Universiade gold medalist and won her first continental title at the 2007 Asian Championships.

== Achievements ==
Year	Tournament	Place	Weight class
2007	Asian Judo Championships	1st	Half heavyweight (78 kg)
2004	Olympic Games	2nd	Half heavyweight (78 kg)
2004	Asian Judo Championships	2nd	Half heavyweight (78 kg)
2003	Universiade	1st	Heavyweight (+78 kg)
