= 2003 Pan American Judo Championships =

Judo competition

2003 Judo Pan American Judo Championships
- Venue: Salvador
- Location: Salvador, Brazil
- Dates: 5–6 June 2003

Competition at external databases
- Links: JudoInside

The 2003 Pan American Judo Championships in Salvador, Brazil from 2 to 9 June 2003.

== Medal overview ==
=== Men's events ===
Event	Gold	Silver	Bronze
–55 kg	Adriano Yamamoto (BRA)	Javier Guédez (VEN)	Emilio Cassineri (ARG)
–55 kg	Adriano Yamamoto (BRA)	Javier Guédez (VEN)	Erwin Guzmán (CHI)
–60 kg	Modesto Lara (DOM)	João Derly (BRA)	Juan Barahona (ECU)
–60 kg	Modesto Lara (DOM)	João Derly (BRA)	Daniel Simard (CAN)
–66 kg	Henrique Guimarães (BRA)	Juan Jacinto (DOM)	Ludwig Ortiz (VEN)
–66 kg	Henrique Guimarães (BRA)	Juan Jacinto (DOM)	Jorge Lencina (ARG)
–73 kg	Chuck Jefferson (USA)	Luis Camilo (BRA)	Jean-François Marceau (CAN)
–73 kg	Chuck Jefferson (USA)	Luis Camilo (BRA)	Richard León (VEN)
–81 kg	Flávio Canto (BRA)	Aaron Cohen (USA)	Ariel Sganga (ARG)
–81 kg	Flávio Canto (BRA)	Aaron Cohen (USA)	José Miguel Boissard (DOM)
–90 kg	Carlos Honorato (BRA)	Keith Morgan (CAN)	Vicbart Geraldino (DOM)
–90 kg	Carlos Honorato (BRA)	Keith Morgan (CAN)	Brian Olson (USA)
–100 kg	Mário Sabino (BRA)	Ramón Ayala (PUR)	Steven Edmonds (CAN)
–100 kg	Mário Sabino (BRA)	Ramón Ayala (PUR)	Arturo Martínez (MEX)
+100 kg	Daniel Hernandes (BRA)	Trevor McAlpine (CAN)	Martin Boonzaayer (USA)
+100 kg	Daniel Hernandes (BRA)	Trevor McAlpine (CAN)	Not awarded
Openweight	Daniel Hernandes (BRA)	Joel Brutus (HAI)	Felix Lebron (DOM)
Openweight	Daniel Hernandes (BRA)	Joel Brutus (HAI)	Orlando Baccino (ARG)

=== Women's events ===
Event	Gold	Silver	Bronze
–44 kg	Yarely Suero (DOM)	Not awarded	Not awarded
–44 kg	Yarely Suero (DOM)	Not awarded	Not awarded
–48 kg	Lisseth Orozco (COL)	Sayaka Matsumoto (USA)	Analy Rodríguez (VEN)
–48 kg	Lisseth Orozco (COL)	Sayaka Matsumoto (USA)	Taciana Lima (BRA)
–52 kg	Aminata Sall (CAN)	Charlee Minkin (USA)	Fabiane Hukuda (BRA)
–52 kg	Aminata Sall (CAN)	Charlee Minkin (USA)	Flor Velázquez (VEN)
–57 kg	Jessica García (PUR)	Michelle Buckingham (CAN)	Tânia Ferreira (BRA)
–57 kg	Jessica García (PUR)	Michelle Buckingham (CAN)	Osdalis Rengel (VEN)
–63 kg	Daniela Krukower (ARG)	Grace Jividen (USA)	Isabelle Pearson (CAN)
–63 kg	Daniela Krukower (ARG)	Grace Jividen (USA)	Vânia Ishii (BRA)
–70 kg	Marie-Hélène Chisholm (CAN)	Cristina Sebastião (BRA)	Elizabeth Copes (ARG)
–70 kg	Marie-Hélène Chisholm (CAN)	Cristina Sebastião (BRA)	Diana Chalá (ECU)
–78 kg	Edinanci Silva (BRA)	Keivi Pinto (VEN)	Amy Cotton (CAN)
–78 kg	Edinanci Silva (BRA)	Keivi Pinto (VEN)	Claudia Rivera (GUA)
+78 kg	Vanessa Zambotti (MEX)	Olia Berger (CAN)	Carmen Chalá (ECU)
+78 kg	Vanessa Zambotti (MEX)	Olia Berger (CAN)	Priscila Marques (BRA)
Openweight	Edinanci Silva (BRA)	Carmen Chalá (ECU)	Not awarded
Openweight	Edinanci Silva (BRA)	Carmen Chalá (ECU)	Not awarded

== Medals table ==
Rank	Nation	Gold	Silver	Bronze	Total
1	Brazil	9	3	4	16
2	Canada	2	4	5	11
3	Dominican Republic	2	1	3	6
4	United States	1	4	2	7
5	Puerto Rico	1	1	0	2
6	Argentina	1	0	5	6
7	Mexico	1	0	1	2
8	Colombia	1	0	0	1
9	Venezuela	0	2	5	7
10	Ecuador	0	1	3	4
11	Haiti	0	1	0	1
12	Chile	0	0	1	1
12	Guatemala	0	0	1	1
Totals (13 entries)		18	17	30	65
