= Mika Mäkeläinen =

Finnish journalist and writer (born 1965)

- Born: 30 May 1965 (age 61); Helsinki, Finland
- Occupations: Journalist, non-fiction writer
- Notable work: Kimlandia: silminnäkijänä Pohjois-Korean kulisseissa

Mika Mäkeläinen (born 30 May 1965) is a Finnish foreign news journalist and non-fiction writer, who has served as both the United States and Asia correspondent for the Finnish public broadcasting company Yle. Mäkeläinen was stationed in Washington, D.C., between 2006 and 2009 and in Beijing between 2015 and 2017.

Mäkeläinen is a four-time recipient of the best report of the year award (in different categories) in the CNN World Report competition. He holds a master's degree in theology from the University of Helsinki, and was accepted into the John S. Knight Journalism Fellowship at Stanford University in 2003.

Mäkeläinen has received international attention for his coverage of North Korea. In 2016, he was the only Nordic journalist invited to cover the 7th Congress of the Workers' Party of Korea. His most notable book, Kimlandia: silminnäkijänä Pohjois-Korean kulisseissa, is based on his experiences in the country. In 2019, a panel of judges selected Kimlandia as the best nonfiction book at the TIETOKIRJA.FI event in Helsinki.

Mäkeläinen has also participated in the creation of a virtual reality experience depicting the nuclear testing at Enewetak Atoll. He was a speaker at the 2019 Online News Association Conference and the 2023 international News Xchange conference.

Since the Russian invasion of Ukraine in 2022, Mäkeläinen has reported extensively from Ukraine for Yle, including from areas near the front line. In April 2023, while reporting from Vovchansk in eastern Ukraine, Mäkeläinen and his camera crew were caught near an artillery strike when a shell exploded less than 100 metres from their vehicle. No members of the crew were injured.

Outside journalism, Mäkeläinen is a long-time enthusiast of DXing, the practice of receiving distant radio signals, and has participated in radio-listening expeditions in Finnish Lapland.

== Bibliography ==
- Kirkkojen maailmanneuvoston kehitysnäkemys 1968–1983. Church Research Institute, 1993. series C, 0781-8572; no. 49. ISBN 951-693-194-4
- Radion rajaton maailma: opas kansainväliseen radiokuunteluun. Tietoteos, 1997. ISBN 951-8919-50-X.
- Villi Länsi: kirjeenvaihtajan kanssa pitkin poikin Amerikkaa. Kirjapaja, 2010. ISBN 978-952-247-106-2.
- Ideasta innovaatioksi: luovuus hyötykäyttöön. Co-written with Jim Solatie. Talentum, 2013. ISBN 978-952-14-2097-9.
- Kimlandia: silminnäkijänä Pohjois-Korean kulisseissa. Atena, 2019. ISBN 978-952-300-496-2.
