= Karin Kienhuis =

Dutch judoka

Personal information
- Nationality: Dutch
- Born: 24 February 1971 (age 55) Almelo, Netherlands

Sport
- Sport: Judo

Karin Kienhuis (born 24 February 1971) is a Dutch judoka. She competed at the 1996 Summer Olympics and the 2000 Summer Olympics.
