= Danieska Carrión =

Cuban judoka (born 1980)

Personal information
- Born: 9 June 1980 (age 46)
- Occupation: Judoka

Sport
- Country: Cuba
- Sport: Judo
- Weight class: –48 kg

Achievements and titles
- World Champ.: (bronze) (2001, 2003)
- Pan American Champ.: (2001)
Medal record
Women's judo
Representing Cuba
World Championships
Bronze medal – third place	2001 Munich	–48 kg
Bronze medal – third place	2003 Osaka	–48 kg
Pan American Games
Gold medal – first place	2003 Santo Domingo	–48 kg
Pan American Championships
Bronze medal – third place	2001 Cordoba	–48 kg
World Juniors Championships
Gold medal – first place	1998 Cali	–48 kg
Summer Universiade
Gold medal – first place	2001 Beijing	–48 kg

Profile at external databases
- IJF: 33162
- JudoInside.com: 961
- Updated on 19 November 2022

Danieska Carrión (born 9 June 1980) is a female judoka from Cuba, who won the gold medal in the women's extra lightweight division (– 48 kg) at the 2003 Pan American Games in Santo Domingo, Dominican Republic. She twice claimed the bronze medal at the World Judo Championships: in 2001 and 2003.
