= Amy Tong =

American judoka (born 1977)

Personal information
- Born: October 18, 1977 (age 48) Honolulu, Hawaii, U.S.
- Height: 5 ft 7 in (170 cm)
- Weight: 172 lb (78 kg)
Medal record
Women's Judo
Representing the United States
Pan American Games
Bronze medal – third place	1999 Winnipeg	Half-Heavyweight

Amy Y. Tong (born October 18, 1977) is a female judoka from the United States. She competed for her native North American country at the 2000 Summer Olympics. Tong won a gold medal in the Women's Half-Heavyweight (– 78 kg) division at the 1999 Pan American Games. Tong was affiliated with the San Jose State University.
