= Amy Cotton =

Canadian Olympic judoka (born 1980)

Personal information
- Born: 22 January 1980 (age 46) Antigonish, Nova Scotia, Canada
- Occupation: Judoka

Sport
- Country: Canada
- Sport: Judo
- Weight class: –78 kg

Achievements and titles
- Olympic Games: R16 (2004)
- World Champ.: 7th (2005, 2009)
- Pan American Champ.: (2000, 2005)
Medal record
Women's judo
Representing Canada
Pan American Games
Bronze medal – third place	2003 Santo Domingo	–78 kg
Pan American Championships
Gold medal – first place	2000 Orlando	–78 kg
Gold medal – first place	2005 Caguas (PUR)	–78 kg
Silver medal – second place	2006 Buenos Aires	–78 kg
Bronze medal – third place	2003 Salvador	–78 kg
Bronze medal – third place	2007 Montreal	Open
Bronze medal – third place	2009 Buenos Aires	–78 kg
Bronze medal – third place	2012 Montreal	–78 kg
Bronze medal – third place	2013 San José	–78 kg
IJF Grand Slam
Gold medal – first place	2012 Moscow	–78 kg
Bronze medal – third place	2012 Tokyo	–78 kg

Profile at external databases
- IJF: 131
- JudoInside.com: 788
- Updated on 27 November 2022

Amy Cotton (born 22 January 1980) is a judoka from Canada, who won the bronze medal in the women's half heavyweight division (-78 kg) at the 2003 Pan American Games in Santo Domingo, Dominican Republic. She represented Canada at the 2004 Summer Olympics in Athens, Greece and the 2012 Summer Olympics in London, United Kingdom.

Cotton was diagnosed with juvenile arthritis at the age of fourteen and was told that if she continued, she would most likely have serious health complications by the age of 21. Cotton continued to train and is a two time Olympian. She now lives in Saskatchewan.

== See also ==
- Judo in Canada
- List of Canadian judoka
