= Simona Richter =

Romanian judoka (born 1972)

Personal information
- Full name: Simona Marcela Richter
- Born: 27 March 1972 (age 54)
- Occupation: Judoka

Sport
- Country: Romania
- Sport: Judo
- Weight class: –78 kg

Achievements and titles
- Olympic Games: (bronze) (2000)
- World Champ.: 7th (1997)
- European Champ.: (silver) (1992, 1995)
Medal record
Women's judo
Representing Romania
Olympic Games
Bronze medal – third place	2000 Sydney	‍–‍78 kg
European Championships
Silver medal – second place	1992 Paris	Open
Silver medal – second place	1995 Birmingham	Open
Bronze medal – third place	1996 The Hague	Open
World Juniors Championships
Bronze medal – third place	1990 Dijon	‍–‍72 kg
Summer Universiade
Silver medal – second place	1999 Palma de Mallorca	‍–‍78 kg

Profile at external databases
- IJF: 2048
- JudoInside.com: 3295
- Updated on 2 June 2023

Simona Marcela Richter (born 27 March 1972 in Reșița, Caraș-Severin) is a retired female judoka from Romania. She claimed a bronze medal in the Women's Light-Heavyweight (‍–‍78 kg) division at the 2000 Summer Olympics in Sydney, Australia, together with Italy's Emanuela Pierantozzi.
