= Nicole Kubes =

American athlete and judoka (born 1986)

Nicole Kubes (born August 22, 1986) is an American athlete and judoka currently living in Fort Worth, TX. Beginning her training in Judo at age 7 with her sister Bridgette, Nicole became one of the youngest members of the United States 2004 Summer Olympics Team in 2004 at age 17. Brigette was later prevented from continuing her training due to a car accident, but Nicole progressed to 9th place in Athens, and also received several national awards including her bronze medal at the 2004 National Championships, a bronze medal at the 2004 Titan Games, a 5th-place finish at the Pan American Championships in Buenos Aires Argentina, and being named a 2003 and 2006 National Champion. She attended Texas Christian University in order to be continue training with her long-time coach Tommy Dyer; after graduation, she began to work as a police officer for Fort Worth.
