= Esther San Miguel =

Spanish Olympic judoka (born 1975)

Personal information
- Full name: Esther San Miguel Busto
- Born: 5 March 1975 (age 51) Burgos, Spain
- Occupation: Judoka
- Height: 1.74 m (5 ft 9 in)

Sport
- Country: Spain
- Sport: Judo
- Weight class: ‍–‍78 kg
- Club: CAR Madrid
- Coached by: Sacramento Moyano

Achievements and titles
- Olympic Games: 5th (2008)
- World Champ.: (bronze) (2003)
- European Champ.: (gold) (1998, 2009)
Medal record
Women's judo
Representing Spain
World Championships
Bronze medal – third place	2003 Osaka	‍–‍78 kg
European Championships
Gold medal – first place	1998 Oviedo	‍–‍78 kg
Gold medal – first place	2009 Tbilisi	‍–‍78 kg
Bronze medal – third place	2004 Bucharest	‍–‍78 kg
Bronze medal – third place	2006 Tampere	‍–‍78 kg
Bronze medal – third place	2007 Belgrade	‍–‍78 kg
Bronze medal – third place	2008 Lisbon	‍–‍78 kg
IJF Grand Prix
Bronze medal – third place	2009 Abu Dhabi	‍–‍78 kg
European Junior Championships
Bronze medal – third place	1992 Jerusalem	‍–‍72 kg
Bronze medal – third place	1993 Arnhem	‍–‍72 kg
Summer Universiade
Bronze medal – third place	1999 Palma de Mallorca	‍–‍78 kg
Mediterranean Games
Gold medal – first place	2005 Almería	‍–‍78 kg

Profile at external databases
- IJF: 469
- JudoInside.com: 635
- Updated on 16 November 2022

Esther San Miguel Busto (born 5 March 1975 in Burgos) is a Spanish judoka. She has won six national titles and two European titles for the half-heavyweight division (78 kg). She is also a bronze medalist at the 2003 World Judo Championships in Osaka, Japan, and has captured a total of twenty-seven World Cup medals, including eight golds. San Miguel is a member of Centro de Alto Rendimiento Madrid Judo Club, and is coached by Sacramento Moyano.

== Judo career ==
Since 1991, San Miguel had been competing in numerous tournaments across Spain and Europe, and had won several medals, including her first title at the 1998 European Judo Championships in Oviedo. She was selected to compete for Spain at the 2000 Summer Olympics in Sydney, where she was defeated by South Korea's Lee So-yeon in the repechage bout of the women's half-heavyweight category (78 kg). At the 2003 World Judo Championships in Osaka, Japan, she made her international breakthrough by winning the bronze medal in the 78 kg class.

At the 2004 Summer Olympics in Athens, San Miguel lost the first preliminary match to Great Britain's Rachel Wildin, who scored an automatic ippon in the half-heavyweight event. Despite her major setback from the Olympics, San Miguel continued to win more bronze medals at the European Championships, and was able to capture her first gold medal at the 2005 Mediterranean Games in Almería.

San Miguel was selected to compete for the third time in the women's half-heavyweight division at the 2008 Summer Olympics in Beijing. She reached the semi-final round of the event by beating Vera Moskalyuk of Russia, Brazil's Edinanci Silva, and Lucia Morico of Italy in the previous preliminary matches. San Miguel, however, was formidably defeated by China's Yang Xiuli, who scored three yuko, and an ippon in the final seconds. With her opponent advancing directly into the finals, San Miguel proceeded to the bronze medal match, where she lost to France's Stéphanie Possamaï by a high-scoring waza-ari, finishing only in fifth place.

At the 2009 European Judo Championships in Tbilisi, Georgia, San Miguel won a gold medal for the half-heavyweight division since her first title in eleven years, defeating Ukraine's Maryna Pryshchepa in the finals.
