= Noriko Anno =

Japanese judoka (born 1976)

Personal information
- Born: 23 May 1976 (age 50) Fukue, Yamaguchi, Japan
- Occupation: Judoka

Sport
- Country: Japan
- Sport: Judo
- Weight class: ‍–‍72 kg, +72 kg, ‍–‍78 kg

Achievements and titles
- Olympic Games: (gold) (2004)
- World Champ.: (1997, 1999, 2001, 2003)
- Asian Champ.: (gold) (1994)
Medal record
Women's judo
Representing Japan
Olympic Games
Gold medal – first place	2004 Athens	‍–‍78 kg
World Championships
Gold medal – first place	1997 Paris	‍–‍72 kg
Gold medal – first place	1999 Birmingham	‍–‍78 kg
Gold medal – first place	2001 Munich	‍–‍78 kg
Gold medal – first place	2003 Osaka	‍–‍78 kg
Silver medal – second place	1993 Hamilton	+72 kg
Asian Games
Gold medal – first place	1994 Hiroshima	Open
World Juniors Championships
Silver medal – second place	1992 Buenos Aires	+72 kg
Summer Universiade
Gold medal – first place	1995 Fukuoka	Open

Profile at external databases
- IJF: 53036
- JudoInside.com: 2852
- Updated on 31 May 2023

Noriko Anno (阿武 教子, born 23 May 1976, in Fukue, Yamaguchi) is a Japanese judoka who won the gold medal in the women's ‍–‍78 kg at the 2004 Summer Olympics. She is a four times World Champion, having won the championships in 1997, 1999, 2001 and 2003.

Anno married judoka Ryuji Sonoda in 2010.
