= Céline Lebrun =

French judoka (born 1976)

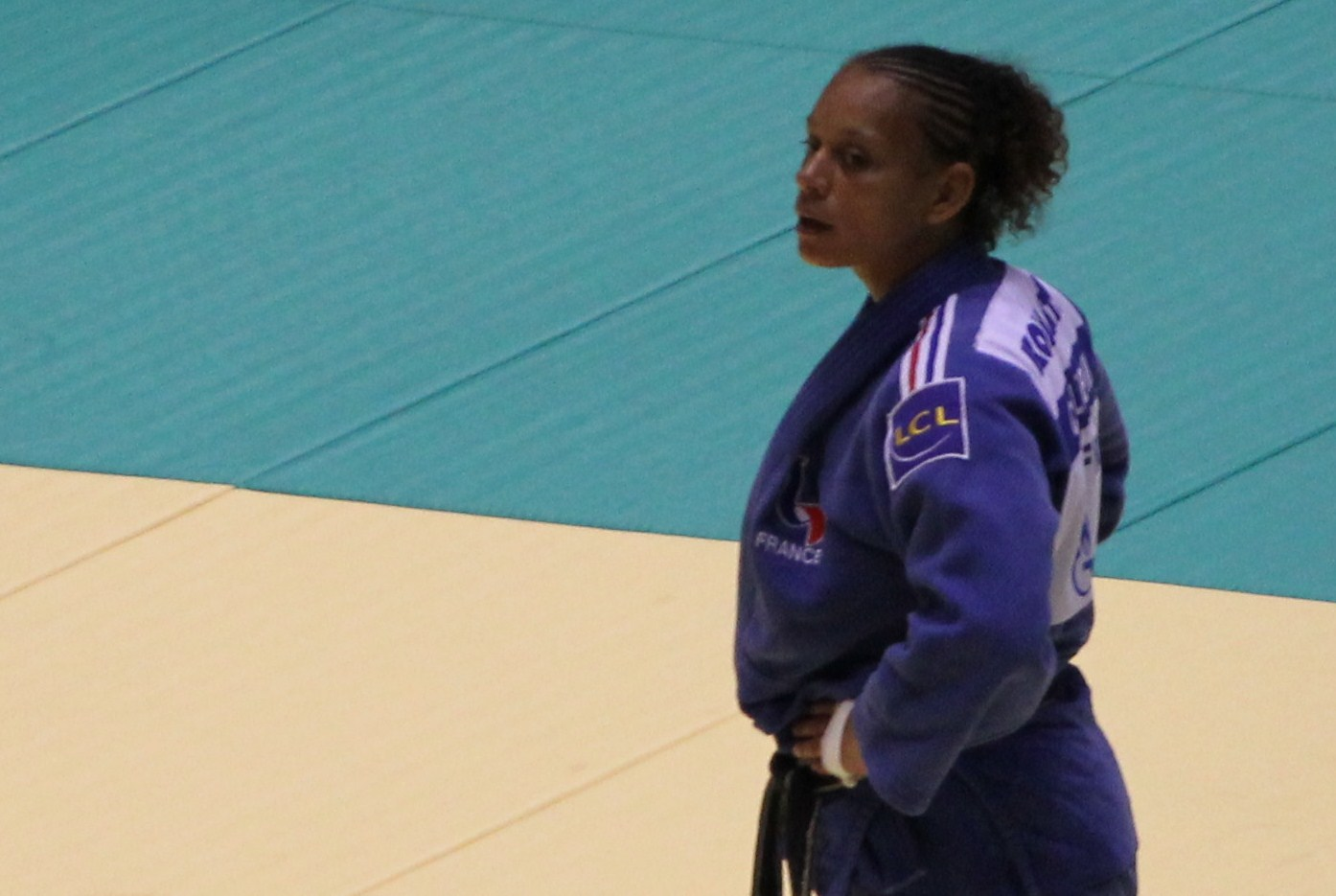

Personal information
- Born: 25 August 1976 (age 49)
- Occupation: Judoka

Sport
- Country: France
- Sport: Judo
- Weight class: –78 kg

Achievements and titles
- Olympic Games: (silver) (2000)
- World Champ.: (2001)
- European Champ.: (gold) (1999, 2000, 2001, 2002, 2005)
Medal record
Women's judo
Representing France
Olympic Games
Silver medal – second place	2000 Sydney	‍–‍78 kg
World Championships
Gold medal – first place	2001 Munich	Open
Bronze medal – third place	1999 Birmingham	‍–‍78 kg
Bronze medal – third place	2001 Munich	‍–‍78 kg
Bronze medal – third place	2005 Cairo	‍–‍78 kg
European Championships
Gold medal – first place	1999 Bratislava	‍–‍78 kg
Gold medal – first place	2000 Wrocław	‍–‍78 kg
Gold medal – first place	2001 Paris	‍–‍78 kg
Gold medal – first place	2002 Maribor	‍–‍78 kg
Gold medal – first place	2005 Rotterdam	‍–‍78 kg
Silver medal – second place	1998 Oviedo	‍–‍78 kg
Silver medal – second place	2006 Tampere	‍–‍78 kg
Bronze medal – third place	1997 Oostende	+72 kg
Bronze medal – third place	2003 Düsseldorf	‍–‍78 kg
World Masters
Gold medal – first place	2010 Suwon	‍–‍78 kg
Silver medal – second place	2011 Baku	‍–‍78 kg
IJF Grand Slam
Gold medal – first place	2009 Paris	‍–‍78 kg
Gold medal – first place	2009 Rio de Janeiro	‍–‍78 kg
Bronze medal – third place	2010 Paris	‍–‍78 kg
IJF Grand Prix
Gold medal – first place	2009 Hamburg	‍–‍78 kg
Gold medal – first place	2009 Abu Dhabi	‍–‍78 kg
Summer Universiade
Gold medal – first place	1999 Palma de Mallorca	‍–‍78 kg

Profile at external databases
- IJF: 420
- JudoInside.com: 369
- Updated on 2 June 2023

Céline Lebrun (born 25 August 1976 in Paris) is a French judoka born in Paris, France. She has competed in judo at both national and international level. She won gold medals in five European Championships (1999, 2000, 2001, 2002, and 2005), and a World Championship in 2001.

Lebrun has competed in the Sydney 2000 and Athens 2004 Olympic Judo events in the half-heavyweight category, earning a silver medal in 2000 and a 5th placing in 2004.
