= Judo Grand Slam =

Judo competitions

The Judo Grand Slam tournaments are international judo tournaments held by the International Judo Federation as part of the IJF World Tour.

After the Olympic Games, World Championships and World Masters, the Grand Slam tournaments are the highest-ranking worldwide judo tournaments, i.e. the tournaments in which the judoka can acquire the most ranking points.

While some sources states that the first Grand Slam tournament was held in Tokyo in December 2008, the IJF titled it as "Kano Cup", not "Grand Slam". In 2009 additional tournaments were also held in Paris, Moscow and Rio de Janeiro. In 2013, Baku replaced Rio de Janeiro. Until 2013 there were four Grand Slam tournaments every year. In 2014 it was decided that a fifth tournament would be added which would be held in Abu Dhabi. In 2019 two additional tournaments were added.

== Tournaments ==
Locations of the Grand Slam Tournaments in 2026

Tournament	City	Country	Editions	Months	Years	Comments
GS Paris	Paris	France	16	February	2009‍–‍	2015 and 2021 in October
GS Tokyo	Tokyo	Japan	12	November/December	2008‍–‍17, 2022‍–‍	The tournament moved to Osaka during 2018‍–‍19 due to the renovation of the Tokyo hall where the tournament takes place.
GS Baku	Baku	Azerbaijan	10	March/May	2013‍–‍	The event wasn't held in 2018 because the 2018 World Cup was held in Baku that year
GS Abu Dhabi	Abu Dhabi	UAE	9	October	2014‍–‍	
GS Budapest	Budapest	Hungary	2	July/October	2020‍–‍	
GS Taschkent	Tashkent	Uzbekistan	3	March	2021‍–‍	
GS Tbilisi	Tbilisi	Georgia	4	March	2021‍–‍	
GS Ulaanbaatar	Ulaanbaatar	Mongolia	3	June	2022‍–‍	
GS Astana	Astana	Kazakhstan	1	June	2023‍–‍	
GS Lausanne	Lausanne	Switzerland	1	August	2026‍–‍	

== Former tournaments ==
Tournament	City	Country	Editions	Months	Years	Comments
GS Moscow	Moscow	Russia	5	May/July	2009‍–‍13	
GS Tyumen	Tyumen	Russia	3	July	2014‍–‍16	
GS Osaka	Osaka	Japan	2	November	2018‍–‍19	
GS Ekaterinburg	Yekaterinburg	Russia	3	March/May	2017‍–‍19	
GS Kazan	Kazan	Russia	1	May	2021	On 25 February 2022 the International Judo Federation canceled the tournament in Russia in response to the 2022 Russian invasion of Ukraine
GS Düsseldorf	Düsseldorf	Germany	3	February	2018‍–‍20	The tournament moved from Baku to Düsseldorf in 2018. The German Judo Federation announced on 15 February 2022 that the event will be canceled this year due to financial difficulties resulting from the restrictions caused by the Corona pandemic.
GS Rio de Janeiro	Rio de Janeiro	Brazil	4	May/June/July	2009‍–‍12	
GS Brasília	Brasília	Brazil	1	October	2019	
GS Tel Aviv	Tel Aviv	Israel	3	February/December	2021‍–‍2023	Being held as a Grand Prix for the inaugural two years, the tournament was elevated to a Grand Slam in 2021.
GS Antalya	Antalya	Turkey	4	April	2021‍–‍2024	

== World Ranking List Points ==
As in any IJF World Tour tournament, athletes earn WRL points by competing in IJF Grand Slam events. Points are awarded based on judoka placement in the competition.

Place	1st	2nd	3rd	5th	7th	1/16th	1/32nd	1 fight won	participation
Points	1000	700	500	360	260	160	120	100	10
