= Lucia Morico =

Italian judoka (born 1975)

Personal information
- Born: 12 December 1975 (age 50) Fano, Italy
- Occupation: Judoka

Sport
- Country: Italy
- Sport: Judo
- Weight class: ‍–‍78 kg
- Club: Fiamme Gialle

Achievements and titles
- Olympic Games: (bronze) (2004)
- World Champ.: 5th (2005, 2007)
- European Champ.: (gold) (2003)
Medal record
Women's judo
Representing Italy
Olympic Games
Bronze medal – third place	2004 Athens	‍–‍78 kg
European Championships
Gold medal – first place	2003 Düsseldorf	‍–‍78 kg
Silver medal – second place	2000 Wrocław	Open
Silver medal – second place	2002 Maribor	‍–‍78 kg
Silver medal – second place	2004 Bucharest	‍–‍78 kg
Bronze medal – third place	2005 Rotterdam	‍–‍78 kg
European Junior Championships
Bronze medal – third place	1993 Arnhem	‍–‍66 kg
Summer Universiade
Bronze medal – third place	1999 Palma de Mallorca	Open

Profile at external databases
- IJF: 52721
- JudoInside.com: 451
- Updated on 31 May 2023

Lucia Morico (born 12 December 1975 in Fano) is an Italian judoka.

Morico won a bronze medal in the half-heavyweight (‍–‍78 kg) division at the 2004 Summer Olympics.
