= Lee So-yeon (judoka) =

South Korean judoka (born 1981)

Medal record

Representing South Korea

Women's Judo

World Championships
Bronze medal – third place	2001 Munich	-78 kg

Asian Games
Silver medal – second place	2006 Doha	-78 kg

- Lee So-yeon
- Hangul: 이소연
- Hanja: 李昭研
- RR: I Soyeon
- MR: I Soyŏn

Lee So-yeon (Korean: 이소연; born 19 July 1981) is a South Korean judoka. She won a bronze medal at the 2001 world championships in Munich and a silver medal at the 2006 Asian Games. Both times she competed in the -78 kg category.
