= List of flag bearers for Turkmenistan at the Olympics =

Turkmenistan at the Olympics
- IOC code: TKM
- NOC: National Olympic Committee of Turkmenistan
- Website: olympic.tm/en
- Medals: Gold 0 Silver 1 Bronze 0 Total 1

Summer appearances
- 1996; 2000; 2004; 2008; 2012; 2016; 2020; 2024

Other related appearances
- Russian Empire (1900–1912); Soviet Union (1952–1988); Unified Team (1992)

This is a list of flag bearers who have represented Turkmenistan at the Olympics.

Flag bearers carry the national flag of their country at the opening ceremony of the Olympic Games.

#	Event year	Season	Flag bearer	Sport	Ref.
1	1996	Summer	Rozy Rejepov	Wrestling	
2	2000	Summer	Chary Mamedov	Athletics	
3	2004	Summer	Shokhrat Kurbanov	Boxing	
4	2008	Summer	Guvanch Nurmuhammedov	Judo	
5	2012	Summer	Serdar Hudayberdiyev	Boxing	
6	2016	Summer	Merdan Ataýew	Swimming	
7	2020	Summer	Merdan Ataýew	Swimming	
7	2020	Summer	Gülbadam Babamuratowa	Judo	
8	2024	Summer	Maysa Pardayeva	Judo	
8	2024	Summer	Serdar Rahimov	Judo	

== See also ==
- Turkmenistan at the Olympics
