= Judo at the 2004 Summer Olympics – Women's 70 kg =

Women's 70 kg at the Games of the XXVIII Olympiad
- Venue: Ano Liossia Olympic Hall
- Dates: 18 August 2004
- Competitors: 23 from 23 nations
- Winning score: 1000

Medalists
1st place, gold medalist(s)		Masae Ueno	Japan
2nd place, silver medalist(s)		Edith Bosch	Netherlands
3rd place, bronze medalist(s)		Qin Dongya	China
3rd place, bronze medalist(s)		Annett Böhm	Germany

Women's 70 kg competition in judo at the 2004 Summer Olympics was held on August 18 at the Ano Liossia Olympic Hall.

This event was the third-heaviest of the women's judo weight classes, limiting competitors to a maximum of 70 kilograms of body mass. Like all other judo events, bouts lasted five minutes. If the bout was still tied at the end, it was extended for another five-minute, sudden-death period; if neither judoka scored during that period, the match is decided by the judges. The tournament bracket consisted of a single-elimination contest culminating in a gold medal match. There was also a repechage to determine the winners of the two bronze medals. Each judoka who had lost to a semifinalist competed in the repechage. The two judokas who lost in the semifinals faced the winner of the opposite half of the bracket's repechage in bronze medal bouts.

== Schedule ==
All times are Greece Standard Time (UTC+2)

Date	Time	Round
Wednesday, 18 August 2004	10:30; 13:00; 17:00	Preliminaries; Repechage; Final

== Qualifying athletes ==
Mat	Athlete	Country
1	Alexia Kourtelesi	Greece
1	Elizabeth Copes	Argentina
1	Edith Bosch	Netherlands
1	Friba Razayee	Afghanistan
1	Cecilia Blanco	Spain
1	Nasiba Salayeva	Turkmenistan
1	Kate Howey	Great Britain
1	Catherine Roberge	Canada
1	Qin Dongya	China
1	Rachida Ouerdane	Algeria
1	Annett Böhm	Germany
2	Raša Sraka	Slovenia
2	Masae Ueno	Japan
2	Celita Schutz	United States
2	Liu Shu-yun	Chinese Taipei
2	Kim Mi-jung	South Korea
2	Catherine Jacques	Belgium
2	Kim Ryon-mi	North Korea
2	Anaysi Hernández	Cuba
2	Antonia Moreira	Angola
2	Catherine Arlove	Australia
2	Andrea Pažoutová	Czech Republic
2	Adriana Dadci	Poland

== Tournament results ==
=== Final ===
Final
1	Edith Bosch (NED)	0001
2	Masae Ueno (JPN)	1000

=== Mat 1 ===
Round of 32
Friba Razayee (AFG)	0000
Cecilia Blanco (ESP)	1000
Nasiba Salayeva (TKM)	0000
Kate Howey (GBR)	1011
Qin Dongya (CHN)	0110
Rachida Ouerdane (ALG)	0010

Round of 16
Alexia Kourtelesi (GRE)	0000
Elizabeth Copes (ARG)	1021
Edith Bosch (NED)	0111
Cecilia Blanco (ESP)	0101
Kate Howey (GBR)	0001
Catherine Roberge (CAN)	0010
Qin Dongya (CHN)	0001
Annett Böhm (GER)	1011

Quarterfinals
Elizabeth Copes (ARG)	0000
Edith Bosch (NED)	1000
Catherine Roberge (CAN)	0000
Annett Böhm (GER)	0011

Semifinals
Edith Bosch (NED)	0110
Annett Böhm (GER)	0000

=== Mat 2 ===
Round of 32
Masae Ueno (JPN)	1000
Celita Schutz (USA)	0001
Kim Mi-jung (KOR)	0010
Catherine Jacques (BEL)	0011
Anaysi Hernandez (CUB)	0000
Antonia Moreira (ANG)	1000
Andrea Pažoutová (CZE)	1111
Adriana Dadci (POL)	0102

Round of 16
Raša Sraka (SLO)	0001
Masae Ueno (JPN)	0012
Liu Shu-yun (TPE)	0010
Catherine Jacques (BEL)	0220
Kim Ryon-mi (PRK)	1010
Antonia Moreira (ANG)	0000
Catherine Arlove (AUS)	1000
Andrea Pažoutová (CZE)	0000

Quarterfinals
Masae Ueno (JPN)	1000
Catherine Jacques (BEL)	0000
Kim Ryon-mi (PRK)	0100
Catherine Arlove (AUS)	1000

Semifinals
Masae Ueno (JPN)	1002
Catherine Arlove (AUS)	0000

=== Repechage ===
Those judoka eliminated in earlier rounds by the four semifinalists of the main bracket advanced to the repechage. These matches determined the two bronze medalists for the event.

First round
Celita Schutz (USA)	0000
Raša Sraka (SLO)	0010

Second round
Cecilia Blanco (ESP)	1011
Elizabeth Copes (ARG)	0000
Qin Dongya (CHN)	1001
Catherine Roberge (CAN)	0000
Raša Sraka (SLO)	0000
Catherine Jacques (BEL)	0200
Andrea Pažoutová (CZE)	0011
Kim Ryon-mi (PRK)	0100

Third round
Cecilia Blanco (ESP)	0000
Qin Dongya (CHN)	1002
Catherine Jacques (BEL)	0110
Kim Ryon-mi (PRK)	0030

Bronze medal finals
Qin Dongya (CHN)	0202
Catherine Arlove (AUS)	0000
Catherine Jacques (BEL)	0000
Annett Böhm (GER)	1000
