= Turkmenistan at the Olympics =

- IOC code: TKM
- NOC: National Olympic Committee of Turkmenistan
- Medals Ranked 137th: Gold 0 Silver 1 Bronze 0 Total 1

Summer appearances
- 1996; 2000; 2004; 2008; 2012; 2016; 2020; 2024; 2028

Other related appearances
- Russian Empire (1900–1912); Soviet Union (1952–1988); Unified Team (1992)

Turkmenistan has competed in 8 Summer Olympic Games, since its debut in 1996. The nation has never competed in the Winter Olympic Games and it is the only post-Soviet state that hasn't competed in them. Turkmenistan is also the northernmost country in the world that has never competed in the Winter Olympics. Turkmen athletes previously competed as a part of the Soviet Union team and, in 1992, as part of the Unified Team.

On July 27, 2021, Turkmenistan won its first ever medal as an independent nation at the 2020 Summer Olympics in Tokyo, with Polina Guryeva winning the silver medal in the women's 59 kg event in Weightlifting.

Other Turkmens who won Olympic medals include late seven-time world champion Marat Nyýazow (representing USSR during the Olympics in Rome in 1960) and Daniyar İsmayilov (currently representing Turkey). Notably, in 1992, 3-time European weightlifting champion Altymyrat Orazdurdyýew was a member of the Unified Team at the Olympic Games in Barcelona. However, head coach Vasily Alexeev did not allow him to compete.

Turkmenistan's capital, Ashgabat, has an Olympic Park, which, in 2017, hosted Asian Olympic Council’s Asian Indoor & Martial Arts games that included participation from Australia and wider Oceania. It also hosted the 2018 World Weightlifting Championships.

The National Olympic Committee of Turkmenistan was formed in 1990.

== Medal tables ==
=== Medals by Summer Games ===
Games	Athletes	Gold	Silver	Bronze	Total	Rank
1900–1912	as part of the Russian Empire					
1920–1948	did not participate					
1952–1988	as part of the Soviet Union					
1992 Barcelona	as part of the Unified Team					
1996 Atlanta	7	0	0	0	0	–
2000 Sydney	8	0	0	0	0	–
2004 Athens	9	0	0	0	0	–
2008 Beijing	10	0	0	0	0	–
2012 London	10	0	0	0	0	–
2016 Rio de Janeiro	9	0	0	0	0	–
2020 Tokyo	9	0	1	0	1	77
2024 Paris	6	0	0	0	0	–
2028 Los Angeles	future event					
2032 Brisbane	future event					
Total		0	1	0	1	137

=== Medals by summer sport ===
Sport	Gold	Silver	Bronze	Total
Weightlifting	0	1	0	1
Totals (1 entries)	0	1	0	1

== List of medalists ==
Medal	Name	Games	Sport	Event	Date
Silver	Polina Guryeva	2020 Tokyo	Weightlifting	Women's 59 kg	27 July 2021

== See also ==
- List of flag bearers for Turkmenistan at the Olympics
- Turkmenistan at the Paralympics
