= Andrea Pažoutová =

Czech judoka

Personal information
- Full name: Andrea Pažoutová-Pokorná
- Born: 6 January 1979 (age 47) Hradec Králové, Czechoslovakia
- Occupation: Judoka
- Height: 1.73 m (5 ft 8 in)

Sport
- Country: Czech Republic
- Sport: Judo
- Weight class: ‍–‍70 kg
- Club: TJ Sokol Hradec Králové
- Coached by: Ivo Pažout

Achievements and titles
- Olympic Games: 9th (2004)
- World Champ.: 9th (1999, 2001)
- European Champ.: (bronze) (2004)
Medal record
Women's judo
Representing Czech Republic
European Championships
Bronze medal – third place	2004 Bucharest	‍–‍70 kg
European Junior Championships
Gold medal – first place	1998 Bucharest	‍–‍70 kg
Bronze medal – third place	1996 Monte Carlo	‍–‍66 kg
Bronze medal – third place	1997 Ljubljana	‍–‍66 kg

Profile at external databases
- IJF: 52974
- JudoInside.com: 645
- Updated on 19 November 2022

Andrea Pažoutová-Pokorná (born 6 January 1979) is a Czech judoka, who competed in the women's middleweight category. She held nine Czech senior titles in her own division, picked up a total of twenty-four medals in her career, including a bronze from the 2004 European Judo Championships in Bucharest, Romania, and represented the Czech Republic in two editions of the Olympic Games (2000 and 2004). Pazoutova also trained for TJ Sokol Hradec Králové in her native Hradec Králové under her personal coach, father, and sensei Ivo Pažout.

== Olympics ==
Pazoutova participated in the 2000 Summer Olympics in Sydney, where she competed for the Czech team in the women's middleweight class (70 kg). She lost her opening match to Spain's Úrsula Martin, who scored a waza-ari and threw her to the tatami with an uchi mata assault throughout the four-minute limit. Pazoutova seized her chance for an Olympic bronze medal, but fell short in another waza-ari kick to Belgian judoka and 1996 Olympic champion Ulla Werbrouck during their repechage match.

At the 2004 Summer Olympics, Pazoutova qualified as a lone judoka for her second Czech squad in the women's middleweight class (70 kg), by placing third and receiving a berth from the European Championships in Bucharest, Romania. She pinned her Poland's Adriana Dadci with a seoi otoshi during the first match, before falling short in an osotogari throw to Australia's Catherine Arlove in the second round. While Arlove moved forward to the semifinal match, Pazoutova faced off against North Korea's Kim Ryon-mi for another chance to receive the bronze medal, but lost the match by a waza-ari point.
