= Kim Ryon-mi =

North Korean Olympic judoka (born 1983)

Personal information
- Full name: Kim Ryon-mi
- Nationality: North Korea
- Born: 8 February 1983 (age 43)
- Height: 1.69 m (5 ft 6 1/2 in)
- Weight: 70 kg (154 lb)

Sport
- Sport: Judo
- Event: 70 kg

Korean name
- Hangul: 김련미
- RR: Gim Ryeonmi
- MR: Kim Ryŏnmi
Medal record
Women's judo
Representing North Korea
Asian Championships
| Silver medal – second place | 2004 Almaty | 70 kg |
| Silver medal – second place | 2005 Tashkent | 70 kg |

Kim Ryon-mi (Korean: 김련미; born February 8, 1983) is a North Korean judoka, who competed in the women's middleweight category. She captured two silver medals in the 70-kg division at the Asian Judo Championships (2004 and 2005), and finished seventh at the 2004 Summer Olympics, representing her nation North Korea.

Kim qualified for the North Korean squad in the women's middleweight class (70 kg) at the 2004 Summer Olympics in Athens, by placing second and receiving a berth from the Asian Championships in Almaty, Kazakhstan. She easily thwarted Angola's Antonia Moreira with an earth-shattering ippon in her opening match, before succumbed to a similar tactic and an sumi gaeshi (corner reversal) hold from Australia's Catherine Arlove. In the repechage round, Kim chased Czech judoka and two-time Olympian Andrea Pažoutová with a sensational ōuchi gari (big inner reap) throw to score a waza-ari (half point) within a five-minute limit, but her rigid form was not enough to combat Belgium's Catherine Jacques in their subsequent match, relegating Kim into the seventh position.
