= Leire Iglesias =

Spanish Olympic judoka

Personal information
- Full name: Leire Iglesias Armiño
- Nationality: Spain
- Born: 7 April 1978 (age 48) Bilbao, Vizcaya, Spain
- Occupation: Judoka
- Height: 1.75 m (5 ft 9 in)

Sport
- Country: Spain
- Sport: Judo
- Weight class: ‍–‍70 kg
- Club: Judo Club Alicante

Achievements and titles
- Olympic Games: 5th (2008)
- World Champ.: 7th (2007)
- European Champ.: (silver) (2008)
Medal record
Women's judo
Representing Spain
European Championships
Silver medal – second place	2008 Lisbon	‍–‍70 kg
World Juniors Championships
Silver medal – second place	1996 Porto	‍–‍66 kg
European Junior Championships
Bronze medal – third place	1995 Valladolid	‍–‍66 kg
Summer Universiade
Bronze medal – third place	1999 Palma de Mallorca	‍–‍70 kg
Bronze medal – third place	2003 Jeju	‍–‍70 kg
Mediterranean Games
Bronze medal – third place	2009 Pescara	‍–‍70 kg

Profile at external databases
- IJF: 1747
- JudoInside.com: 626
- Updated on 16 November 2022

Leire Iglesias Armiño (Note: In this Spanish name, the first or paternal surname is Iglesias and the second or maternal family name is Armiño.) (born 7 April 1978 in Bilbao, Vizcaya) is a Spanish judoka, who played for the middleweight category. She is a five-time World Cup champion, and a silver medalist at the 2008 European Judo Championships in Lisbon, Portugal. She also won two bronze medals for the same division at the 1999 Summer Universiade in Palma de Mallorca, and at the 2003 Summer Universiade in Jeju City, South Korea.

Iglesias represented Spain at the 2008 Summer Olympics in Beijing, where she competed for the women's middleweight class (70 kg). In the preliminaries, she first defeated Brazil's Mayra Aguiar, and eventually upset world champion Gévrise Émane, who was considered a top medal contender in this event. She reached only into the quarterfinal round, where she lost by an automatic ippon to German judoka and Olympic bronze medalist Annett Böhm. Because her opponent advanced further into the semi-finals, Iglesias offered another shot for the bronze medal by defeating Ukraine's Nataliya Smal and Colombia's Yuri Alvear in the repechage rounds. She finished in fifth place, after losing out the bronze medal match to Dutch judoka and former silver medalist Edith Bosch, who successfully scored an ippon at three minutes and fourteen seconds.
