= Turkmenistan at the 2024 Summer Paralympics =

- IPC code: TKM
- NPC: National Paralympic Committee of Turkmenistan

in Paris, France August 28, 2024 – September 8, 2024
- Competitors: 1 in 1 sport
- Flag bearer: Mayagozel Ekeyeva
- Medals: Gold 0 Silver 0 Bronze 0 Total 0

Summer Paralympics appearances (overview)
- 2000; 2004; 2008; 2012; 2016; 2020; 2024

Other related appearances
- Soviet Union (1988); Unified Team (1992)

Turkmenistan competed at the 2024 Summer Paralympics in Paris, France, from 28 August to 8 September 2024. This was the nation's sixth time competing at the Summer Paralympic Games after it made its debut at the 2000 Summer Paralympics. The delegation consisted of only one competitor from one sport.

== Competitors ==
The following is the list of number of competitors in the Games.

Sport	Men	Women	Total
Powerlifting	0	1	1
Total	0	1	1

== Powerlifting ==
Athlete	Event	Final	
Athlete	Event	Result	Rank
Maýagözel Ekeýewa	Women's +86 kg		

== See also ==
- Turkmenistan at the 2024 Summer Olympics
- Turkmenistan at the Paralympics
