= Zahoui =

Zahoui is a name. Notable people with the name include:

- François Zahoui (born 1961), Ivorian footballer
- Lea Zahoui Blavo (born 1975), Ivorian judoka
