= Turkmenistan at the 2020 Summer Olympics =

- IOC code: TKM
- NOC: National Olympic Committee of Turkmenistan
- Website: https://olympic.tm/en

in Tokyo, Japan July 23, 2021 – August 8, 2021
- Competitors: 9 in 4 sports
- Flag bearers (opening): Gulbadam Babamuratova; Merdan Ataýew
- Flag bearer (closing): N/A
- Medals Ranked 77th: Gold 0 Silver 1 Bronze 0 Total 1

Summer Olympics appearances (overview)
- 1996; 2000; 2004; 2008; 2012; 2016; 2020; 2024

Other related appearances
- Russian Empire (1900–1912); Soviet Union (1952–1988); Unified Team (1992)

Turkmenistan competed at the 2020 Summer Olympics in Tokyo. Originally scheduled to take place from 24 July to 9 August 2020, the Games were postponed to 23 July to 8 August 2021, due to the COVID-19 pandemic. This was the nation's seventh consecutive appearance at the Summer Olympics in the post-Soviet era.

Polina Guryeva won the country's first ever medal by placing second in the women's 59 kg in weightlifting. With that achievement Turkmenistan became the last post-Soviet country to win a medal at the Olympics.

== Medallist ==
Medal	Name	Sport	Event	Date
Silver	Polina Guryeva	Weightlifting	Women's 59 kg	27 July

== Competitors ==
The following is the list of number of competitors in the Games.

Sport	Men	Women	Total
Athletics	1	0	1
Judo	0	1	1
Swimming	1	1	2
Weightlifting	3	2	5
Total	5	4	9

== Athletics ==
Turkmenistan received a universality slot from IAAF to send a male track and field athlete to the Olympics.

Key

- Note–Ranks given for track events are within the athlete's heat only
- Q = Qualified for the next round
- q = Qualified for the next round as a fastest loser or, in field events, by position without achieving the qualifying target
- NR = National record
- N/A = Round not applicable for the event
- Bye = Athlete not required to compete in round

Field events

Athlete	Event	Qualification		Final	
Athlete	Event	Distance	Position	Distance	Position
Mergen Mämmedow	Men's hammer throw	67.53	30	Did not advance	

== Judo ==
Turkmenistan entered one female judoka into the Olympic tournament based on the International Judo Federation Olympics Individual Ranking.

Athlete	Event	Round of 32	Round of 16	Quarterfinals	Semifinals	Repechage	Final / BM	
Athlete	Event	Opposition Result	Opposition Result	Opposition Result	Opposition Result	Opposition Result	Opposition Result	Rank
Gulbadam Babamuratova	Women's −52 kg	Cohen (ISR); L 00–10	Did not advance					

== Swimming ==
Turkmenistan received a universality invitation from FINA to send two top-ranked swimmers (one per gender) in their respective individual events to the Olympics, based on the FINA Points System of June 28, 2021.

Athlete	Event	Heat		Semifinal		Final	
Athlete	Event	Time	Rank	Time	Rank	Time	Rank
Merdan Ataýew	Men's 100 m backstroke	55.24	34	Did not advance			
Merdan Ataýew	Men's 200 m backstroke	2:03.68	29	Did not advance			
Darya Semyonova	Women's 100 m breaststroke	1:16.37	39	Did not advance			

== Weightlifting ==
Turkmen weightlifters qualified for five quota places at the games, based on the Tokyo 2020 Rankings Qualification List of 11 June 2021.

Athlete	Event	Snatch		Clean & Jerk		Total	Rank
Athlete	Event	Result	Rank	Result	Rank	Total	Rank
Rejepbaý Rejepow	Men's −81 kg	164	3	~~198~~	DNF	164	DNF
Öwez Öwezow	Men's −109 kg	171	11	200	10	371	10
Hojamuhammet Toýçyýew	Men's +109 kg	184	4	230	6	414	4
Kristina Şermetowa	Women's −55 kg	90	5	115	5	205	6
Polina Guryeva	Women's −59 kg	96	3	121	2	217	2nd place, silver medalist(s)
