= Judo at the 2000 Summer Olympics – Women's 70 kg =

Women's 70 kg at the Games of the XXVII Olympiad
- Venue: Sydney Convention and Exhibition Centre
- Date: 20 September 2000
- Competitors: 22 from 22 nations

Medalists
| 1st place, gold medalist(s) | | Sibelis Veranes | Cuba |
| 2nd place, silver medalist(s) | | Kate Howey | Great Britain |
| 3rd place, bronze medalist(s) | | Cho Min-Sun | South Korea |
| 3rd place, bronze medalist(s) | | Ylenia Scapin | Italy |

These are the results of the women's 70 kg (also known as middleweight) competition in judo at the 2000 Summer Olympics in Sydney. A total of 22 women qualified for this event, limited to jūdōka whose body weight was less than, or equal to, 70 kilograms. Competition took place in the Sydney Convention and Exhibition Centre on 20 September.

== Competitors ==
| Athlete | Nation |
|---|---|
| Mariama Sonah Bah | Guinea |
| Daniela Krukower | Argentina |
| Nesria Traki | Tunisia |
| Qin Dongya | China |
| Ji Kyong-sun | North Korea |
| Edith Bosch | Netherlands |
| Masae Ueno | Japan |
| Tetyana Byelyayeva | Ukraine |
| Dorjgotovyn Tserenkhand | Mongolia |
| Úrsula Martín | Spain |
| Andrea Pažoutová | Czech Republic |
| Ulla Werbrouck | Belgium |
| Sandra Bacher | United States |
| Catherine Arlove | Australia |
| Yvonne Wansart | Germany |
| Karine Rambault | France |
| Sibelis Veranes | Cuba |
| Lea Zahoui Blavo | Ivory Coast |
| Aprilia Marzuki | Indonesia |
| Yulia Kuzina | Russia |
| Ylenia Scapin | Italy |
| Xiomara Griffith | Venezuela |
| Cho Min-Sun | South Korea |

== Main bracket ==
The gold and silver medalists were determined by the final match of the main single-elimination bracket.

Round of 32
Mariama Sonah Bah (GUI) | L
Daniela Krukower (ARG) | W
Nesria Traki (TUN) | W
Qin Dongya (CHN) | L
Ji Kyong-sun (PRK) | W
Edith Bosch (NED) | W
Tetyana Byelyayeva (UKR) | L
Dorjgotovyn Tserenkhand (MGL) | W
Úrsula Martín (ESP) | W
Andrea Pažoutová (CZE) | L
Yvonne Wansart (GER) | W
Karine Rambault (FRA) | L
Lea Zahoui Blavo (CIV) | W
Aprilia Marzuki (INA) | L
Ylenia Scapin (ITA) | W
Xiomara Griffith (VEN) | L

Round of 16
Daniela Krukower (ARG) | L
Kate Howey (GBR) | W
Nesria Traki (TUN) | L
Edith Bosch (NED) | W
Masae Ueno (JPN) | W
Dorjgotovyn Tserenkhand (MGL) | L
Úrsula Martín (ESP) | W
Ulla Werbrouck (BEL) | L
Sandra Bacher (USA) | W
Catherine Arlove (AUS) | L
Yvonne Wansart (GER) | L
Sibelis Veranes (CUB) | W
Lea Zahoui Blavo (CIV) | L
Yulia Kuzina (RUS) | W
Ylenia Scapin (ITA) | L
Cho Min-Sun (KOR) | W

Quarterfinals
Kate Howey (GBR) | W
Edith Bosch (NED)
Masae Ueno (JPN) | L
Úrsula Martín (ESP) | W
Sandra Bacher (USA) | L
Sibelis Veranes (CUB) | W
Yulia Kuzina (RUS) | L
Cho Min-Sun (KOR) | W

Semifinals
Kate Howey (GBR) | W
Úrsula Martín (ESP) | L
Sibelis Veranes (CUB) | W
Cho Min-Sun (KOR) | L

Gold medal final
Kate Howey (GBR) | L
Sibelis Veranes (CUB) | W

=== Repechage ===
The losing semifinalists as well as those judoka eliminated in earlier rounds by the four semifinalists of the main bracket advanced to the repechage. These matches determined the two bronze medalists for the event.

First round
Krukower (ARG) | W
Bye | L
Pazoutova (CZE) | L
Werbrouck (BEL) | W
Wansart (GER) | W
Bye | L
Scapin (ITA) | W
Bye | L

Second round
Krukower (ARG) | L
Bosch (NED) | W
Werbrouck (BEL) | W
Ueno (JPN) | L
Wansart (GER) | W
Bacher (USA) | L
Scapin (ITA) | W
Kuzina (RUS) | L

Third round
Bosch (NED) | L
Werbrouck (BEL) | W
Wansart (GER) | L
Scapin (ITA) | W

Bronze medal finals
Werbrouck (BEL) | L
Cho (KOR) | W
Scapin (ITA) | W
Martin (ESP) | L
