= Turkmenistan at the 2004 Summer Paralympics =

- IPC code: TKM
- NPC: National Paralympic Committee of Turkmenistan

in Athens
- Competitors: 4 in 1 sport
- Medals: Gold 0 Silver 0 Bronze 0 Total 0

Summer Paralympics appearances (overview)
- 2000; 2004; 2008; 2012; 2016; 2020; 2024

Other related appearances
- Soviet Union (1988); Unified Team (1992)

Turkmenistan competed at the 2004 Summer Paralympics in Athens, Greece. The team included four athletes, all of them men, and won no medals.

== Sports ==
=== Powerlifting ===
Athlete	Event	Result	Rank
Atajan Begniyazov	48kg	130.0	6
Sergey Meladze	60kg	152.5	8
Ovezgeldy Orjiyev	75kg	170.0	10
Yusup Sapbiyev	52kg	125.0	13

== See also ==
- Turkmenistan at the Paralympics
- Turkmenistan at the 2004 Summer Olympics
