= Turkmenistan at the 2008 Summer Olympics =

- IOC code: TKM
- NOC: National Olympic Committee of Turkmenistan

in Beijing
- Competitors: 10 in 6 sports
- Flag bearer: Guwanç Nurmuhammedow
- Medals: Gold 0 Silver 0 Bronze 0 Total 0

Summer Olympics appearances (overview)
- 1996; 2000; 2004; 2008; 2012; 2016; 2020; 2024

Other related appearances
- Russian Empire (1900–1912); Soviet Union (1952–1988); Unified Team (1992)

Turkmenistan competed in the 2008 Summer Olympics held in Beijing, People's Republic of China from August 8 to August 24, 2008. The country's flagbearer at the Games' opening ceremony was judoka Guwanç Nurmuhammedow.

== Athletics ==
Men

Athlete	Event	Qualification		Final	
Athlete	Event	Distance	Position	Distance	Position
Amanmurad Hommadov	Hammer throw	NM	—	Did not advance	

Women

Athlete	Event	Heat		Quarterfinal		Semifinal		Final	
Athlete	Event	Result	Rank	Result	Rank	Result	Rank	Result	Rank
Valentina Nazarova	100 m	11.94	6	Did not advance					

Key

- Note–Ranks given for track events are within the athlete's heat only
- Q = Qualified for the next round
- q = Qualified for the next round as a fastest loser or, in field events, by position without achieving the qualifying target
- NR = National record
- N/A = Round not applicable for the event
- Bye = Athlete not required to compete in round

== Boxing ==
Athlete	Event	Round of 32	Round of 16	Quarterfinals	Semifinals	Final	
Athlete	Event	Opposition Result	Opposition Result	Opposition Result	Opposition Result	Opposition Result	Rank
Aliasker Bashirov	Welterweight	Chiguer (FRA); L 6–17	Did not advance				

== Judo ==
Athlete	Event	Preliminary	Round of 32	Round of 16	Quarterfinals	Semifinals	Repechage 1	Repechage 2	Repechage 3	Final / BM	
Athlete	Event	Opposition Result	Opposition Result	Opposition Result	Opposition Result	Opposition Result	Opposition Result	Opposition Result	Opposition Result	Opposition Result	Rank
Guwanç Nurmuhammedow	Men's −66 kg	Pak C-M (PRK); L 0000–1000	Did not advance				Casale (ITA); L 0002–0012	Did not advance			
Nasiba Surkieva	Women's −70 kg	—	Rousey (USA); L 0000–1010	Did not advance							

== Shooting ==
Women

Athlete	Event	Qualification		Final	
Athlete	Event	Points	Rank	Points	Rank
Yekaterina Arabova	10 m air rifle	376	47	Did not advance	

== Swimming ==
Men

Athlete	Event	Heat		Semifinal		Final	
Athlete	Event	Time	Rank	Time	Rank	Time	Rank
Andrey Molchanov	50 m freestyle	25.02	64	Did not advance			

Women

Athlete	Event	Heat		Semifinal		Final	
Athlete	Event	Time	Rank	Time	Rank	Time	Rank
Olga Hachatryan	100 m freestyle	1:14.77	48	Did not advance			

== Weightlifting ==
Athlete	Event	Snatch		Clean & Jerk		Total	Rank
Athlete	Event	Result	Rank	Result	Rank	Total	Rank
Ümürbek Bazarbaýew	Men's −62 kg	133	6	~~160~~	DNF	133	DNF
Tolkunbek Hudaýbergenow	Men's −62 kg	126	14	162	7	288	7

== See also ==
- Turkmenistan at the 2008 Summer Paralympics
