= Wang Juan =

Wang Juan may refer to:

- Wang Juan (judoka) (born 1982), Chinese judoka
- Wang Juan (athlete) (born 1975), Paralympic athlete from China
- Wang Juan (wrestler) (born 1995), Chinese wrestler
