= Turkmenistan at the 2012 Summer Paralympics =

- IPC code: TKM
- NPC: National Paralympic Committee of Turkmenistan

in London
- Competitors: 5 in 2 sports
- Medals: Gold 0 Silver 0 Bronze 0 Total 0

Summer Paralympics appearances (overview)
- 2000; 2004; 2008; 2012; 2016; 2020; 2024

Other related appearances
- Soviet Union (1988); Unified Team (1992)

Turkmenistan competed at the 2012 Summer Paralympics in London, United Kingdom from August 29 to September 9, 2012.

== Athletics ==
Men’s Field Events

Athlete	Event	Distance	Rank
Sohbet Charyyev	Long Jump F13	5.53	14

== Powerlifting ==
Men

Athlete	Event	Result	Rank
Mekan Agalikov	-52kg	150	8
Sergey Meladze	-67.5kg	180	6

Women

Athlete	Event	Result	Rank
Valentina Simakova	-67.5kg	95	7
Jennet Orjiyeva	-75kg	85	7

== See also ==
- Turkmenistan at the 2012 Summer Olympics
