= Adriana Dadci =

Polish judoka (born 1979)

Personal information
- Full name: Adriana Dadci-Smoliniec
- Nationality: Poland
- Born: 9 April 1979 (age 47) Gdynia, Poland
- Height: 1.75 m (5 ft 9 in)
- Weight: 70 kg (154 lb)

Sport
- Sport: Judo
- Event: 70 kg
- Club: AZS AWFiS Gdańsk
- Coached by: Radosław Laskowski
Medal record
Women's judo
Representing Poland
European Championships
Gold medal – first place	2002 Maribor	70 kg
Bronze medal – third place	2001 Paris	70 kg

Adriana Dadci (née Smoliniec, born 9 April 1979) is a Polish judoka, who competed in the women's middleweight category. She held seven Polish senior titles in her own division, picked up a total of nineteen medals in her career, including a gold from the 2002 European Judo Championships in Maribor, Slovenia, and represented Poland at the 2004 Summer Olympics. Dadci also trained as a full-fledged member of the judo squad for AZS Academy of Physical Education (Polish: AZS Akademia Wychowania Fizycznego) in Gdańsk under her personal coach and sensei Radosław Laskowski.

Dadci qualified for the Polish squad in the women's middleweight class (70 kg) at the 2004 Summer Olympics in Athens, based on the nation's entry to the top 22 in the world rankings for her division from the International Judo Federation. She lost her opening match to Czech judoka and two-time Olympian Andrea Pažoutová, who successfully scored an ippon and pulverized her to the tatami with a seoi otoshi (kneeling shoulder drop) sixteen seconds before their five-minute match expired.
