= Judo at the 2008 Summer Olympics – Women's 70 kg =

Women's 70 kg at the Games of the XXIX Olympiad
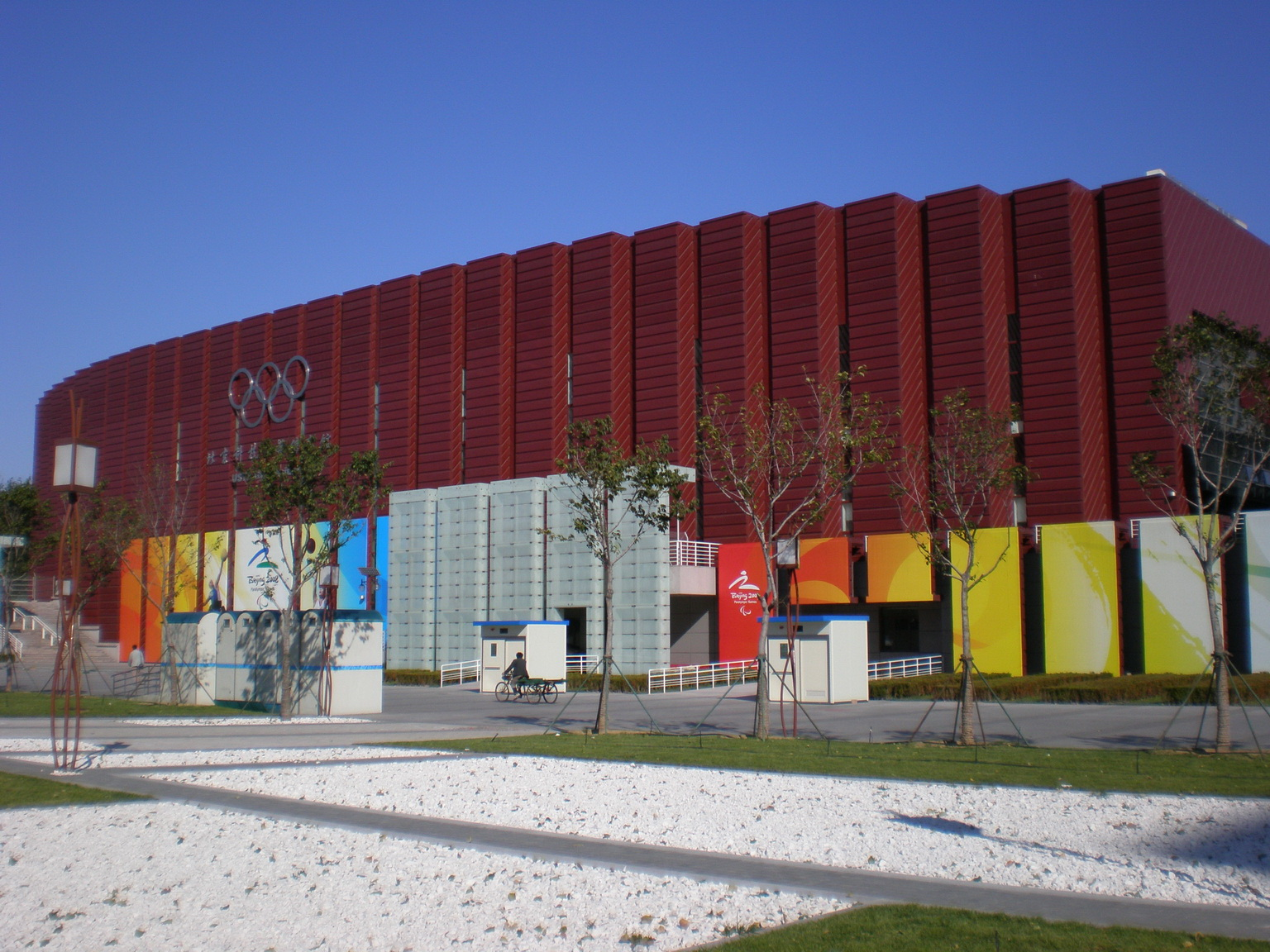
- Beijing Science and Technology University Gymnasium
- Venue: Beijing Science and Technology; University Gymnasium
- Date: August 13, 2008
- Competitors: 22 from 22 nations
- Winning score: 1000

Medalists
1st place, gold medalist(s)		Masae Ueno	Japan
2nd place, silver medalist(s)		Anaysi Hernández	Cuba
3rd place, bronze medalist(s)		Ronda Rousey	United States
3rd place, bronze medalist(s)		Edith Bosch	Netherlands

The Women's 70 kg (also known as middleweight) tournament in the judo at the 2008 Summer Olympics was held on August 13 at the Beijing Science and Technology University Gymnasium. A total of 22 women competed in this event, limited to jūdōka with a bodyweight of less than 70 kilograms. Preliminary rounds started at 12:00 Noon CST. Repechage finals, semifinals, bouts for bronze medals, and the final were held at 18:00 pm CST.

This event was the third-heaviest of the women's judo weight classes, limiting competitors to a maximum of 70 kilograms of body mass. Like all other judo events, bouts lasted five minutes. If the bout was still tied at the end, it was extended for another five-minute, sudden-death period; if neither judoka scored during that period, the match is decided by the judges. The tournament bracket consisted of a single-elimination contest culminating in a gold medal match. There was also a repechage to determine the winners of the two bronze medals. Each judoka who had lost to a semifinalist competed in the repechage. The two judokas who lost in the semifinals faced the winner of the opposite half of the bracket's repechage in bronze medal bouts.

Bronze medal winner Ronda Rousey, would later began a successful career in mixed martial arts where she would be the UFC's first female champion at bantamweight. She was later inducted into the UFC Hall of Fame.

== Qualifying athletes ==
Mat	Athlete	Country
1	Anett Meszaros	Hungary
1	Yulia Kuzina	Russia
1	Wang Juan	China
1	Park Ka-yeon	South Korea
1	Masae Ueno	Japan
1	Rachida Ouerdane	Algeria
1	Edith Bosch	Netherlands
1	Sisilia Nasiga	Fiji
1	Ronda Rousey	United States
1	Nasiba Surkieva	Turkmenistan
1	Katarzyna Pilocik	Poland
2	Yuri Alvear	Colombia
2	Zhanar Zhanzunova	Kazakhstan
2	Anaysi Hernández	Cuba
2	Ylenia Scapin	Italy
2	Catherine Jacques	Belgium
2	Mayra Aguiar	Brazil
2	Leire Iglesias	Spain
2	Gévrise Émane	France
2	Gisèle Mendy	Senegal
2	Annet Böhm	Germany
2	Nataliya Smal	Ukraine

== Tournament results ==
=== Final ===
Final
1	Masae Ueno (JPN)	1000
2	Anaysi Hernández (CUB)	0000

=== Mat 1 ===
Round of 32
Park Ka-Yeon (KOR)	0000
Masae Ueno (JPN)	1010
Edith Bosch (NED)	1000
Sisilia Nasiga (FIJ)	0000
Ronda Rousey (USA)	1010
Nasiba Surkieva (TKM)	0000

Round of 16
Anett Meszaros (HUN)	0010
Yulia Kuzina (RUS)	0002
Wang Juan (CHN)	0001
Masae Ueno (JPN)	1011
Rachida Ouerdane (ALG)	0010
Edith Bosch (NED)	0110
Ronda Rousey (USA)	1000
Katarzyna Pilocik (POL)	0000

Quarterfinals
Anett Meszaros (HUN)	0000
Masae Ueno (JPN)	0200
Edith Bosch (NED)	1000
Ronda Rousey (USA)	0000

Semifinals
Masae Ueno (JPN)	0110
Edith Bosch (NED)	0001

=== Mat 2 ===
First Round
Yuri Alvear (COL)	1000
Zhanar Zhanzunova (KAZ)	0000
Mayra Aguiar (BRA)	0011
Leire Iglesias (ESP)	0020
Gisèle Mendy (SEN)	0000
Annett Böhm (GER)	1000

Round of 16
Yuri Alvear (COL)	0100
Anaysi Hernández (CUB)	1000
Ylenia Scapin (ITA)	0010
Catherine Jacques (BEL)	0000
Leire Iglesias (ESP)	0001
Gévrise Émane (FRA)	0000
Annett Böhm (GER)	1001
Nataliya Smal (UKR)	0010

Quarterfinals
Anaysi Hernández (CUB)	1000
Ylenia Scapin (ITA)	0000
Leire Iglesias (ESP)	0000
Annett Böhm (GER)	1000

Semifinals
Anaysi Hernández (CUB)	1000
Annett Böhm (GER)	0010

=== Repechage ===
First round
Park Ka-Yeon (KOR)	0000
Wang Juan (CHN)	0010
Sisilia Nasiga (FIJ)	0000
Rachida Ouerdane (ALG)	1001
Yuri Alvear (COL)
Bye
Gisèle Mendy (SEN)	0000
Nataliya Smal (UKR)	0201

Second round
Anett Meszaros (HUN)	1010
Wang Juan (CHN)	0000
Ronda Rousey (USA)	1001
Rachida Ouerdane (ALG)	0000
Ylenia Scapin (ITA)	0010
Yuri Alvear (COL)	1000
Leire Iglesias (ESP)	0011
Nataliya Smal (UKR)	0000

Third round
Anett Meszaros (HUN)	0000
Ronda Rousey (USA)	1010
Yuri Alvear (COL)	0000
Leire Iglesias (ESP)	0001

Bronze medal finals
Annett Böhm (GER)	0001
Ronda Rousey (USA)	0010
Edith Bosch (NED)	1001
Leire Iglesias (ESP)	0000
