= Mariama Sonah Bah =

Guinean judoka

Personal information
- Nationality: Guinean
- Born: 21 May 1978 (age 46)

Sport
- Sport: Judo

Mariama Sonah Bah (born 21 May 1978) is a Guinean judoka. She competed in the women's middleweight event at the 2000 Summer Olympics.
