= Elizabeth Copes =

Argentine judoka (born 1976)

Personal information
- Full name: Elizabeth Carina Copes
- Nationality: Argentina
- Born: 4 October 1976 (age 49) La Plata, Argentina
- Height: 1.72 m (5 ft 7 1/2 in)
- Weight: 70 kg (154 lb)

Sport
- Sport: Judo
- Event: 70 kg
- Club: Estudiantes de la Plata
- Coached by: Fernando Yuma

Elizabeth Carina Copes (born October 4, 1976, in La Plata) is an Argentine judoka, who competed in the women's middleweight category. She held a 2002 Argentine senior title for her own division, picked up a total of thirteen medals in her career, and also represented her nation Argentina at the 2004 Summer Olympics.

Copes qualified for the Argentine squad in the women's middleweight class (70 kg) at the 2004 Summer Olympics in Athens, by placing second and receiving a berth from the Pan American Championships in Margarita Island, Venezuela. She overwhelmed Greece's Alexia Kourtelesi in front of the massive home crowd for a victory in the opening match, before falling short to Dutch judoka and eventual silver medalist Edith Bosch, who scored an ippon and tightly wrapped her with an uchi mata makikomi fashion at one minute and nine seconds. In the repechage round, Copes gave herself a chance for an Olympic bronze medal, but her powerful grips were not enough to throw and Spain's Cecilia Blanco into the tatami with an ippon seoi nage (one-arm shoulder throw) during their first playoff.
