= Yulia Kuzina =

Russian Olympic judoka

Personal information
- Full name: Yuliya Valeryevna Kuzina
- Born: 25 October 1976 (age 49) Orsk, Orenburg Oblast, Russian SFSR
- Occupation: Judoka
- Height: 1.66 m (5 ft 5 in)

Sport
- Country: Russia
- Sport: Judo
- Weight class: ‍–‍63 kg, ‍–‍70 kg
- Club: Dynamo Orsk

Achievements and titles
- Olympic Games: R16 (2008)
- World Champ.: 9th (1999)
- European Champ.: (bronze) (2004)
Medal record
Women's judo
Representing Russia
European Championships
Bronze medal – third place	2004 Bucharest	‍–‍63 kg

Profile at external databases
- IJF: 52717, 53151
- JudoInside.com: 8630
- Updated on 19 November 2022

Yuliya Valeryevna Kuzina (also Yulia Kuzina, Russian: Юлия Валерьевна Кузина; born 25 October 1976, in Orsk, Orenburg Oblast) is a Russian judoka, who played for the middleweight category. She won a bronze medal for the 63 kg division at the 2004 European Judo Championships in Bucharest, Romania. Merited Master of Sport of Russia (2001).

== Career ==
Kuzina made her official debut for the 2000 Summer Olympics in Sydney, where she competed in the women's middleweight class (70 kg). She defeated Côte d'Ivoire's Lea Zahoui Blavo in the preliminary rounds, before losing out the quarterfinal match by an ippon and an uchi mata (inner thigh throw) to South Korea's Cho Min-Sun. Kuzina offered another shot for the bronze medal by entering the repechage bouts, but she lost her first match, with three yuko and a harai makikomi (hip sweep wraparound), to Italy's Ylenia Scapin.

Eight years after competing in her first Olympics, Kuzina qualified for the women's 70 kg class, as a 31-year-old, at the 2008 Summer Olympics in Beijing, by placing fifth from the European Judo Championships in Lisbon. Kuzina lost the preliminary round of sixteen match, by a yuko, to Hungary's Anett Mészáros, although she received two shidos (penalties) for using the non-combativity technique.
