= Sibelis Veranes =

Cuban judoka (born 1974)

Personal information
- Born: 5 February 1974 (age 52)
- Occupation: Judoka

Sport
- Country: Cuba
- Sport: Judo
- Weight class: –66 kg, –70 kg

Achievements and titles
- Olympic Games: (gold) (2000)
- World Champ.: (1999)
- Pan American Champ.: (1996, 1997, 1998, 2002)
Medal record
Women's judo
Representing Cuba
Olympic Games
| Gold medal – first place | 2000 Sydney | ‍–‍70 kg |
World Championships
| Gold medal – first place | 1999 Birmingham | ‍–‍70 kg |
Pan American Games
| Gold medal – first place | 1999 Winnipeg | ‍–‍70 kg |
Pan American Championships
| Gold medal – first place | 1996 San Juan | ‍–‍66 kg |
| Gold medal – first place | 1997 Guadalajara | ‍–‍66 kg |
| Gold medal – first place | 1998 Santo Domingo | ‍–‍70 kg |
| Gold medal – first place | 2002 Santo Domingo | ‍–‍70 kg |
Summer Universiade
| Gold medal – first place | 1999 Palma de Mallorca | ‍–‍70 kg |

Profile at external databases
- IJF: 53145
- JudoInside.com: 996
- Updated on 2 June 2023

Sibelis Veranes Morell (born 5 February 1974) is a Cuban judoka. At the 2000 Summer Olympics she won the gold medal in the women's Middleweight (‍–‍70 kg) category.
