= Turkmenistan at the 2008 Summer Paralympics =

- IPC code: TKM
- NPC: National Paralympic Committee of Turkmenistan

in Beijing
- Competitors: 3 in 1 sport
- Flag bearers: Ovez Orjiyev (opening & closing)
- Medals: Gold 0 Silver 0 Bronze 0 Total 0

Summer Paralympics appearances (overview)
- 2000; 2004; 2008; 2012; 2016; 2020; 2024

Other related appearances
- Soviet Union (1988); Unified Team (1992)

Turkmenistan sent a delegation to compete at the 2008 Summer Paralympics in Beijing, China. The country was represented by three athletes, all competing in powerlifting.

== Powerlifting ==
Men

Athlete	Event	Result	Rank
Ovez Orjiyev	-82.5 kg	190.0	7

Women

Athlete	Event	Result	Rank
Mayagozel Pekiyeva	-56 kg	82.5	7
Valentina Simakova	-75 kg	97.5	6

== See also ==
- Turkmenistan at the Paralympics
- Turkmenistan at the 2008 Summer Olympics
