= Nesria Traki =

Tunisian judoka (born 1972)

Personal information
- Nationality: Tunisian
- Born: 8 March 1972 (age 54)

Sport
- Sport: Judo
Medal record
Representing Tunisia
Women's judo
African Judo Championships
Silver medal – second place	1996 South Africa	–66 kg

Nesria Traki (born 8 March 1972) is a Tunisian judoka. She competed in the women's middleweight event at the 2000 Summer Olympics.
