= Alexia Kourtelesi =

Greek judoka

Personal information
- Full name: Alexia Kourtelesi
- Nationality: Greece
- Born: 23 May 1971 (age 55) Athens, Greece
- Height: 1.76 m (5 ft 9 1/2 in)
- Weight: 70 kg (154 lb)

Sport
- Sport: Judo
- Event: 70 kg
- Club: AON Argiroupolis

Alexia Kourtelesi (Greek: Αλεξία Κουρτελέση; born 23 May 1971) is a former Greek judoka, who competed in the women's middleweight category, and judo coach.

According to the Hellenic Judo Federation, she is the most prominent Greek female judoka of all times, winning 20 gold and 2 bronze medals in Greek Championships until 2007.

== Domestic competitions ==
According to archived records of the Hellenic Judo Federation, Kourtelesi's honours in domestic competitions are the following:

=== Senior ===
Date	Event	Category	Position
13/3/87	Greek Women Championship 1987	+72 kg	1st
7/4/89	Greek Women Championship 1989	Open	1st
7/4/89	Greek Women Championship 1989	+72 kg	1st
22/3/90	Greek Women Championship 1990	Open	3rd
22/3/90	Greek Women Championship 1990	-72 kg	1st
29/3/91	Greek Women Championship 1991	Open	1st
29/3/91	Greek Women Championship 1991	-72 kg	1st
17/4/92	Greek Women Championship 1992	-72 kg	1st
17/4/92	Greek Women Championship 1992	Open	1st
8/12/95	Greek Men - Women Championship 1995	-72 kg	1st
8/12/95	Greek Men - Women Championship 1995	Open	1st
29/11/96	Greek Men - Women Championship 1996	-72 kg	1st
5/12/97	Greek Men - Women Championship 1997	-70 kg	1st
21/12/00	Greek Men - Women Championship 2000	-70 kg	1st
21/12/00	Greek Men - Women Championship 2000	Open	1st
30/11/01	Greek Men - Women Championship 2001	-70 kg	1st
29/11/02	Greek Men - Women Championship 2002	-70 kg	1st
16/12/03	Greek Men - Women Championship 2003	-70 kg	1st
17/12/04	Greek Men - Women Championship 2004	-70 kg	1st
9/12/05	Greek Men - Women Championship 2005	-70 kg	1st
1/12/06	Greek Men - Women Championship 2006	-70 kg	1st
7/12/07	Greek Men - Women Championship 2007	-78 kg	3rd

=== Junior ===
Date	Event	Category	Position
26/6/87	Greek Female Junior Championship 1987	-66 kg	1st
23/4/88	Greek Female Junior Championship 1988	+72 kg	2nd
10/6/89	Greek Female Junior Championship 1989	-72 kg	1st

== International competitions ==
=== Olympic Games ===
Kourtelesi represented her home nation Greece at the 2004 Summer Olympics in Athens. Kourtelesi qualified for the Greek squad in the women's middleweight class (70 kg) at the 2004 Summer Olympics in Athens, by filling up an entry by the International Judo Federation and the Hellenic Olympic Committee, as Greece received an automatic berth for being the host nation. Kourtelesi received a bye in the opening round, but crashed out early in a defeat to Argentina's Elizabeth Copes by an ippon and an ippon seoi nage (one-arm shoulder throw) two minutes and fifty-six seconds into her first match.

=== Mediterranean Games ===
She has represented Greece in the Mediterranean Games three times: in Bari (1997), Tunis (2001) and Almeria (2005).

=== Balkan Games ===
According to the Polydamas sports club, she has won 5 medals: 1 Gold (1988), 1 Silver (1990) and 3 Bronze (1987, 1989, 1990) in the Judo Balkan Games.

According to archived records of the Hellenic Judo Federation the Gold medal was in the 14th Balkan Junior Games of 1988 and the bronze medal in 1990 was in the 15th Balkan Games.
