= Kim Mi-jung (judoka, born 1978) =

South Korean judoka

Personal information
- Born: August 1, 1978 (age 47)
- Height: 168 cm (5 ft 6 in)
- Weight: 70 kg (154 lb)

Korean name
- Hangul: 김미정
- Hanja: 金美廷
- RR: Gim Mijeong
- MR: Kim Mijŏng

Kim Mi-jung (born August 1, 1978) is a retired female South Korean judoka.

At the 2004 Summer Olympics she competed in the middleweight-class, losing in the first round to Belgian Catherine Jacques.
