= Turkmenistan at the Paralympics =

- IPC code: TKM
- NPC: National Paralympic Committee of Turkmenistan
- Medals: Gold 0 Silver 0 Bronze 0 Total 0

Summer appearances
- 2000; 2004; 2008; 2012; 2016; 2020; 2024

Other related appearances
- Soviet Union (1988); Unified Team (1992)

Turkmenistan made its Paralympic Games debut at the 2000 Summer Paralympics in Sydney, with Atajan Begniyazov as its sole representative (in the men's -48 kg in powerlifting). It has competed in every edition of the Summer Paralympics since then, but never in the Winter Paralympics.

Since their debut, Turkmens have mostly only competed in powerlifting; with 2012 being the only edition that they've fielded a non-powerlifting athlete, Sohbet Charyyev, specializing in long jump. Turkmenistan has never won a medal at the Paralympic Games.

== Summer Paralympic Games ==
=== Medals by Games ===
Games	Athletes	Gold	Silver	Bronze	Total	Rank
(Australia) Sydney 2000	1	0	0	0	0	−
(Greece) Athens 2004	4	0	0	0	0	−
(China) Beijing 2008	3	0	0	0	0	−
(United Kingdom) London 2012	5	0	0	0	0	−
(Brazil) Rio de Janeiro 2016	2	0	0	0	0	–
(Japan) Tokyo 2020	did not participate					
(France) Paris 2024	1	0	0	0	0	–
(United States) Los Angeles 2028	future event					
(Australia) Brisbane 2032	future event					
Total	16	–	–	–	–	–

== See also ==
- Turkmenistan at the Olympics
