= Turkmenistan at the 2012 Summer Olympics =

- IOC code: TKM
- NOC: National Olympic Committee of Turkmenistan

in London
- Competitors: 10 in 5 sports
- Flag bearer: Serdar Hudaýberdiýev
- Medals: Gold 0 Silver 0 Bronze 0 Total 0

Summer Olympics appearances (overview)
- 1996; 2000; 2004; 2008; 2012; 2016; 2020; 2024

Other related appearances
- Russian Empire (1900–1912); Soviet Union (1952–1988); Unified Team (1992)

Turkmenistan competed at the 2012 Summer Olympics in London, from 27 July to 12 August 2012. This was the nation's fifth consecutive appearance at the Olympics.

The National Olympic Committee of Turkmenistan sent a total of 10 athletes to the Games, 7 men and 3 women, to compete in 5 sports. This was the same size as in Beijing, although it had a slight difference of share between male and female athletes. Four athletes received their spots in athletics and swimming through wild card entries, while the other Turkmen athletes won their spots by participating in various qualifying matches around the world. Among these athletes, weightlifter Umurbek Bazarbaýew competed at his second consecutive Olympics. Light welterweight boxer Serdar Hudaýberdiýev was the nation's flag bearer at the opening ceremony.

Turkmenistan, however, had to wait nine more years for its first medal.

== Athletics ==
Men

Athlete	Event	Qualification		Final	
Athlete	Event	Distance	Position	Distance	Position
Mergen Mämmedow	Hammer throw	68.39	35	did not advance	

Women

Athlete	Event	Heat		Quarterfinal		Semifinal		Final	
Athlete	Event	Result	Rank	Result	Rank	Result	Rank	Result	Rank
Maýsa Rejepowa	100 m	12.80	4	did not advance					

Key

- Note–Ranks given for track events are within the athlete's heat only
- Q = Qualified for the next round
- q = Qualified for the next round as a fastest loser or, in field events, by position without achieving the qualifying target
- NR = National record
- N/A = Round not applicable for the event
- Bye = Athlete not required to compete in round

== Boxing ==
Turkmenistan has so far qualified the following boxers.

Men

Athlete	Event	Round of 32	Round of 16	Quarterfinals	Semifinals	Final	
Athlete	Event	Opposition Result	Opposition Result	Opposition Result	Opposition Result	Opposition Result	Rank
Serdar Hudaýberdiýev	Light welterweight	Kumar (IND); L 7–13	did not advance				
Nursähet Pazzyýew	Middleweight	Kılıççı (TUR); L 7–14	did not advance				

== Judo ==
Athlete	Event	Round of 32	Round of 16	Quarterfinals	Semifinals	Repechage	Final / BM	
Athlete	Event	Opposition Result	Opposition Result	Opposition Result	Opposition Result	Opposition Result	Opposition Result	Rank
Gulnar Hayytbaeva	Women's −63 kg	Yusubova (AZE); L 0000–0111	did not advance					

== Swimming ==
Turkmenistan has gained two "Universality places" from the FINA.

Men

Athlete	Event	Heat		Semifinal		Final	
Athlete	Event	Time	Rank	Time	Rank	Time	Rank
Sergeý Krowýakow	100 m freestyle	54.43 NR	46	did not advance			

Women

Athlete	Event	Heat		Final	
Athlete	Event	Time	Rank	Time	Rank
Jennet Saryýewa	400 m freestyle	5:40.29 NR	35	did not advance	

== Weightlifting ==
Turkmenistan has so far qualified three men quota places.

Athlete	Event	Snatch		Clean & Jerk		Total	Rank
Athlete	Event	Result	Rank	Result	Rank	Total	Rank
Umurbek Bazarbaýew	Men's −62 kg	135	7	167	6	302	6
Daniyar Ismayilov	Men's −69 kg	145	6	165	16	310	13
Mansur Rejepov	Men's −85 kg	160	10	~~188~~	DNF	160	DNF
