= Úrsula Martín =

Spanish judoka

Úrsula Martín Oñate
Personal information
- Nationality: Spanish
- Born: 1 June 1976 (age 49) Madrid, Spain

Sport
- Sport: Judo

Úrsula Martín Oñate (born 1 June 1976) is a Spanish judoka. She competed in the women's middleweight event at the 2000 Summer Olympics in Sydney.
