= Turkmenistan at the 1996 Summer Olympics =

- IOC code: TKM
- NOC: National Olympic Committee of Turkmenistan

in Atlanta
- Competitors: 7 (4 men and 3 women) in 6 sports
- Flag bearer: Rozy Redzhepov
- Medals: Gold 0 Silver 0 Bronze 0 Total 0

Summer Olympics appearances (overview)
- 1996; 2000; 2004; 2008; 2012; 2016; 2020; 2024

Other related appearances
- Russian Empire (1900–1912); Soviet Union (1952–1988); Unified Team (1992)

Turkmenistan competed in the Olympic Games as an independent nation for the first time at the 1996 Summer Olympics in Atlanta, United States. Previously, the nation was part of the Unified Team at the 1992 Summer Olympics.

== Athletics ==
Men
Field events

Athlete	Event	Qualification		Final	
Athlete	Event	Distance	Position	Distance	Position
Vladimir Malyavin	Long jump	No Mark		did not advance	

Key

- Note–Ranks given for track events are within the athlete's heat only
- Q = Qualified for the next round
- q = Qualified for the next round as a fastest loser or, in field events, by position without achieving the qualifying target
- NR = National record
- N/A = Round not applicable for the event
- Bye = Athlete not required to compete in round

== Boxing ==
Athlete	Event	Round of 32	Round of 16	Quarterfinals	Semifinals	Final	
Athlete	Event	Opposition Result	Opposition Result	Opposition Result	Opposition Result	Opposition Result	Rank
Shohrat Kurbanov	Light middleweight	Pettersson (SWE); L 2–7	did not advance				

== Judo ==
Athlete	Event	Round of 32	Round of 16	Quarterfinals	Semifinals	Final / BM	
Athlete	Event	Opposition Result	Opposition Result	Opposition Result	Opposition Result	Opposition Result	Rank
Galina Atayeva	Women's 48 kg	n/a	Tortora (ITA); L	did not advance			15T
Olesya Nazarenko	Women's 72 kg	n/a	Curto (ESP); L	did not advance			15T

== Shooting ==
Turkmenistan has qualified a single shooter.

Men

Athlete	Event	Qualification		Final	
Athlete	Event	Points	Rank	Points	Rank
Igor Pirekeyev	50 m rifle prone	595	11	did not advance	

== Table tennis ==
Singles

Athlete	Event	Group round		Round of 16	Quarterfinals	Semifinals	Bronze medal	Final	
Athlete	Event	Opposition Result	Rank	Opposition Result	Opposition Result	Opposition Result	Opposition Result	Opposition Result	Rank
Aida Steshenko	Women's singles	Group K Park Hae-jung (KOR); L 0 – 2 Olga Nemes (GER); L 0 – 2 Chen Chiu–Tan (TPE); L 0 – 2	4	did not advance					

== Wrestling ==
Greco–Roman

Athlete	Event	Round 1	Round 2	Round 3	Round 4	Round 5	Final / BM	
Athlete	Event	Opposition Result	Opposition Result	Opposition Result	Opposition Result	Opposition Result	Opposition Result	Rank
Rozy Redzhepov	−90 kg	Švec (CZE); W 3-1	Fafiński (POL); L 2-12	Yeghishyan (ARM); L 2-5	did not advance			12
