= Turkmenistan at the 2004 Summer Olympics =

- IOC code: TKM
- NOC: National Olympic Committee of Turkmenistan

in Athens
- Competitors: 9 in 6 sports
- Flag bearer: Shohrat Kurbanov
- Medals: Gold 0 Silver 0 Bronze 0 Total 0

Summer Olympics appearances (overview)
- 1996; 2000; 2004; 2008; 2012; 2016; 2020; 2024

Other related appearances
- Russian Empire (1900–1912); Soviet Union (1952–1988); Unified Team (1992)

Turkmenistan competed at the 2004 Summer Olympics in Athens, Greece, from 13 to 29 August 2004.

== Athletics ==
Turkmen athletes have so far achieved qualifying standards in the following athletics events (up to a maximum of 3 athletes in each event at the 'A' Standard, and 1 at the 'B' Standard).

Men
Track & road events

| Athlete | Event | Heat | | Semifinal | | Final | |
| Athlete | Event | Result | Rank | Result | Rank | Result | Rank |
|---|---|---|---|---|---|---|---|
| Nazar Begliyev | 800 m | 1:49.64 | 6 | did not advance | | | |

Women
Field events

| Athlete | Event | Qualification | | Final | |
| Athlete | Event | Distance | Position | Distance | Position |
|---|---|---|---|---|---|
| Svetlana Pessova | Long jump | 5.64 | 37 | did not advance | |

Key

- Note–Ranks given for track events are within the athlete's heat only
- Q = Qualified for the next round
- q = Qualified for the next round as a fastest loser or, in field events, by position without achieving the qualifying target
- NR = National record
- N/A = Round not applicable for the event
- Bye = Athlete not required to compete in round

== Boxing ==
Turkmenistan sent two boxers to Athens through the FIBA Asian Championships and Olympic Qualification Tournament.

| Athlete | Event | Round of 32 | Round of 16 | Quarterfinals | Semifinals | Final | |
| Athlete | Event | Opposition Result | Opposition Result | Opposition Result | Opposition Result | Opposition Result | Rank |
|---|---|---|---|---|---|---|---|
| Aliasker Bashirov | Welterweight | Jasevičius (LTU); W 54–21 | Artayev (KAZ); L 23–33 | did not advance | | | |
| Shohrat Kurbanov | Light heavyweight | El Shamy (EGY); L 22–44 | did not advance | | | | |

== Judo ==
Turkmenistan has qualified a single judoka.

| Athlete | Event | Round of 32 | Round of 16 | Quarterfinals | Semifinals | Repechage 1 | Repechage 2 | Repechage 3 | Final / BM | |
| Athlete | Event | Opposition Result | Opposition Result | Opposition Result | Opposition Result | Opposition Result | Opposition Result | Opposition Result | Opposition Result | Rank |
|---|---|---|---|---|---|---|---|---|---|---|
| Nasiba Salayeva | Women's −70 kg | Howey (GBR); L 0000–1011 | did not advance | | | | | | | |

== Shooting ==
Turkmenistan has qualified a single shooter.

Men

| Athlete | Event | Qualification | | Final | |
| Athlete | Event | Points | Rank | Points | Rank |
|---|---|---|---|---|---|
| Igor Pirekeev | 50 m rifle prone | 594 | =9 | did not advance | |
| Igor Pirekeev | 50 m rifle 3 positions | 1156 | =22 | did not advance | |

== Swimming ==
Men

| Athlete | Event | Heat | | Semifinal | | Final | |
| Athlete | Event | Time | Rank | Time | Rank | Time | Rank |
|---|---|---|---|---|---|---|---|
| Hojamamed Hojamamedov | 50 m freestyle | 27.68 | 72 | did not advance | | | |

Women

| Athlete | Event | Heat | | Semifinal | | Final | |
| Athlete | Event | Time | Rank | Time | Rank | Time | Rank |
|---|---|---|---|---|---|---|---|
| Yelena Rojkova | 100 m backstroke | 1:15.48 | 42 | did not advance | | | |

== Weightlifting ==
Turkmenistan has qualified a single weightlifter.

| Athlete | Event | Snatch | | Clean & Jerk | | Total | Rank |
| Athlete | Event | Result | Rank | Result | Rank | Total | Rank |
|---|---|---|---|---|---|---|---|
| Ümürbek Bazarbaýew | Men's −62 kg | 130 | 9 | 157.5 | 10 | 287.5 | 7 |

== See also ==
- Turkmenistan at the 2002 Asian Games
- Turkmenistan at the 2004 Summer Paralympics
