= Yvonne Wansart =

German judoka

Personal information
- Nationality: German
- Born: 21 May 1974 (age 50); Cologne, West Germany

Sport
- Sport: Judo

Yvonne Wansart (born 21 May 1974) is a German judoka. She competed in the women's middleweight event at the 2000 Summer Olympics.
