= Annett Böhm =

German judoka (born 1980)

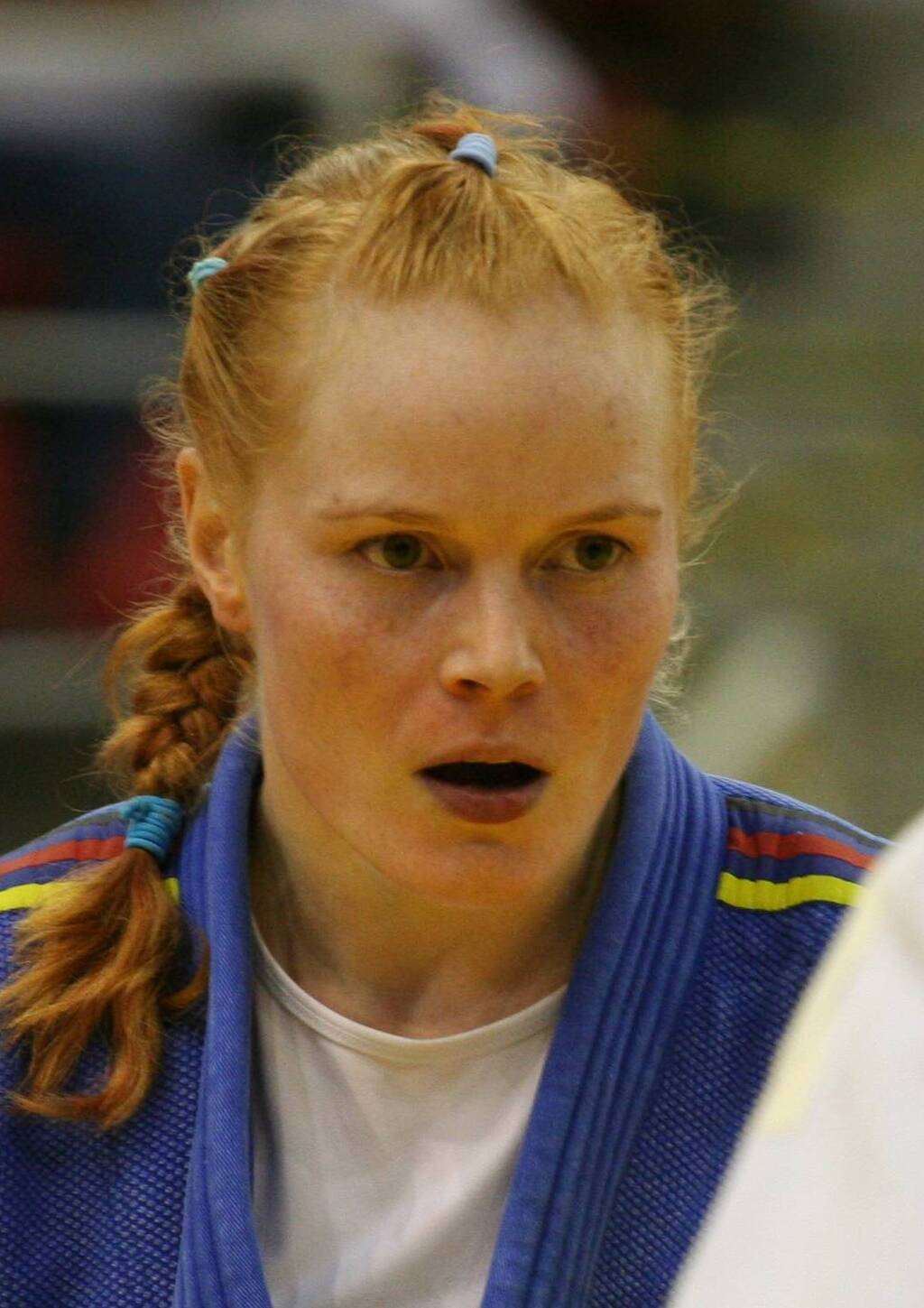

Personal information
- Born: 8 January 1980 (age 46)
- Occupation: Judoka

Sport
- Country: Germany
- Sport: Judo
- Weight class: –70 kg

Achievements and titles
- Olympic Games: (bronze) (2004)
- World Champ.: (bronze) (2003)
- European Champ.: 5th (2000, 2002)
Medal record
Women's judo
Representing Germany
Olympic Games
Bronze medal – third place	2004 Athens	‍–‍70 kg
World Championships
Bronze medal – third place	2003 Osaka	‍–‍70 kg
European Junior Championships
Gold medal – first place	1997 Ljubljana	‍–‍72 kg
Silver medal – second place	1999 Rome	‍–‍70 kg

Profile at external databases
- IJF: 4269
- JudoInside.com: 213
- Updated on 31 May 2023

Annett Böhm (born 8 January 1980 in Meerane, Saxony, East Germany) is a German Judoka.

== Career ==
She began practicing Judo in PSC Glauchau/Meerane at the age of 7 years. Her first coaches were Erhard and Michael Hinke. In 1995 she went to a sport boarding school in Leipzig where she trained as part of the high performance Judo group. Böhm finished her Master of Sport science at the University of Leipzig in 2005. In 2007, she started to study journalism.

Her coach since 1999 has been Norbert Littkopf. He was for several years also the coach of the German women's national team.

Her first major success was in 1997, when she won the gold medal at the European Junior Championships in Ljubljana, Slovenia. Two years later she won the silver medal. She gained 5th place at the 2000 European Championships in Wrocław, Poland and won her first gold medal at the German National Championships.

In her first World Championships in 2003 in Osaka, Japan, she surprisingly won the bronze medal. This qualified her for the 2004 Summer Olympics in Athens, Greece. In Athens she won a bronze medal in the middleweight (‍–‍70 kg) division. She beat opponents Quin Dongya (China) and Catherine Roberge (Canada). In the semi-final she lost her only fight against Edith Bosch (Netherlands). After this fight, Böhm beat Catherine Jacques (Belgium) in only 38 seconds with an ippon-score (Te-Guruma) for a bronze medal.

In 2005, Böhm sustained several injuries. Six weeks before the 2005 World Championships in Cairo, Egypt, she broke her left foot. Nevertheless, she battled through her injuries to narrowly miss bronze. In the following year she had several surgical procedures, which prevented her from going to the 2006 European Championships.

In 2007, she qualified for the World Championships in Rio de Janeiro, Brazil. She only won one fight, placing her 9th place. This meant that she did not achieve direct qualification for the 2008 Summer Olympics in Beijing, China. However, in 2008 she returned to her old form. She won bronze medals at the Super World Cup in Paris, France, and Sofia, Bulgaria. This placed her among the top 5 on the European ranking list, which qualified her for the Olympics. At the 2008 Beijing Olympics, she lost the bronze medal match of the middleweight (‍–‍70 kg) division to American Ronda Rousey.

== Photos ==
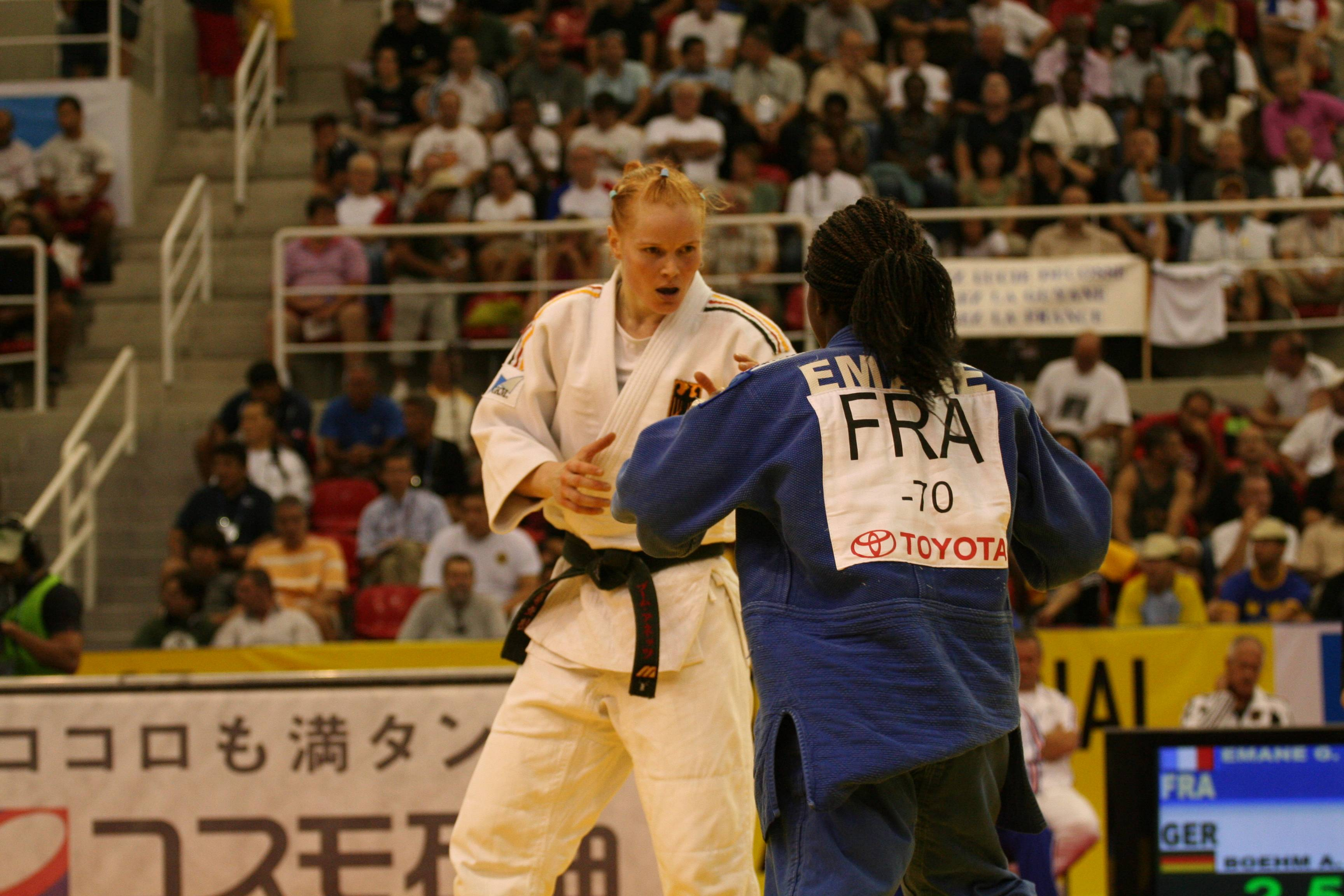
Böhm vs. Gévrise Emane (FRA) - Judo World Championships in Brazil 2007

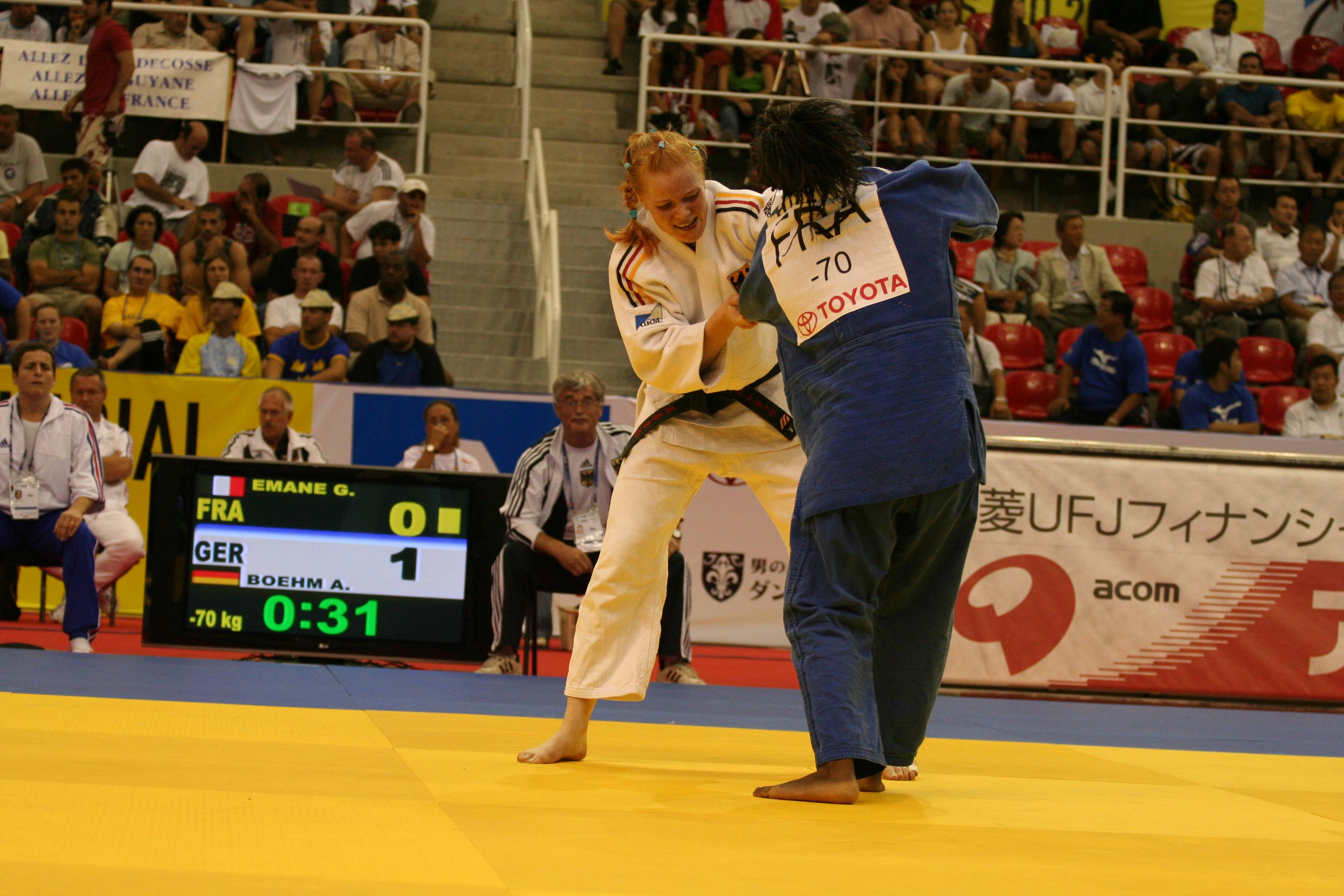
Böhm vs. Gévrise Emane (FRA) - Judo World Championships in Brazil 2007

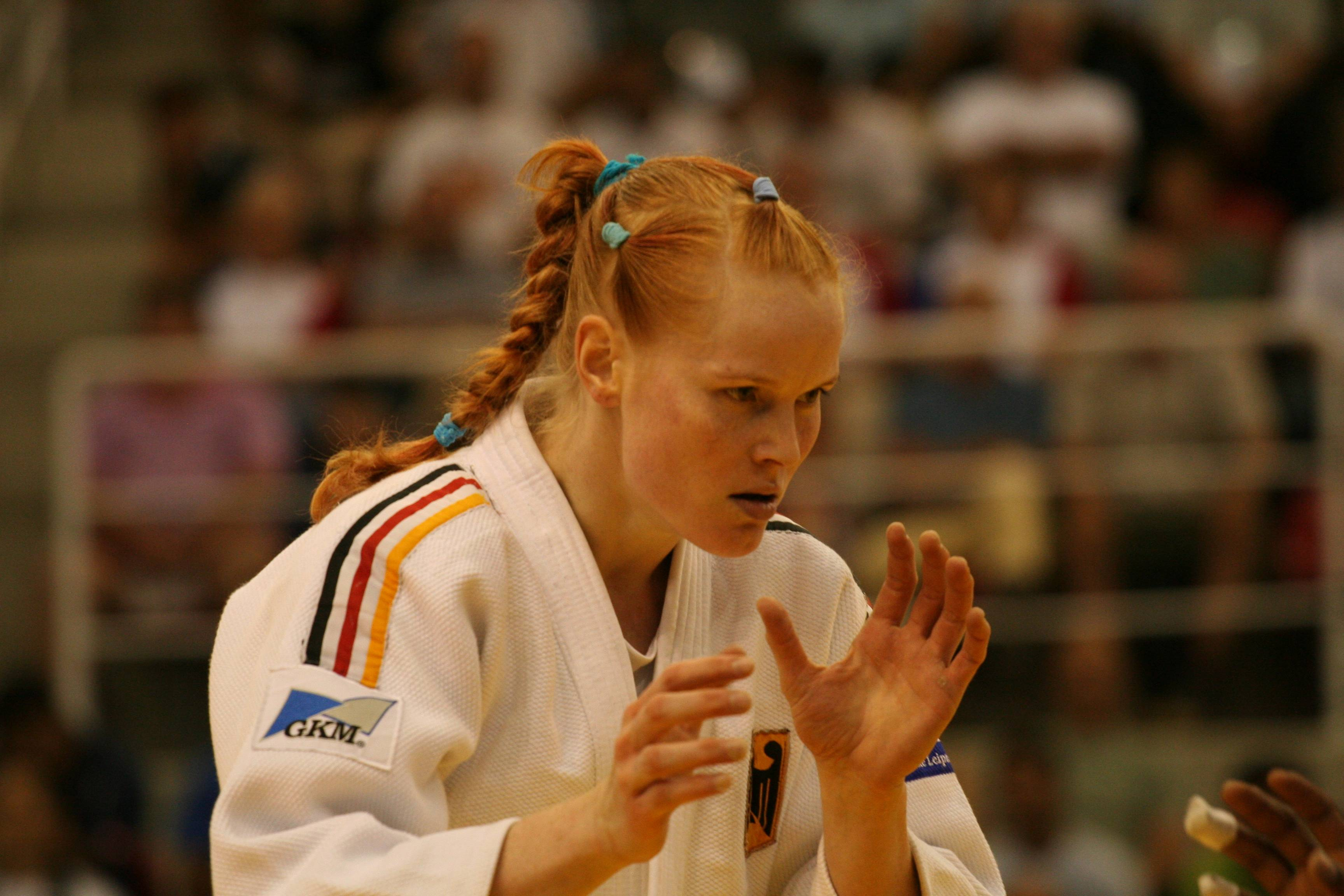
Böhm - Judo World Championships in Brazil 2007

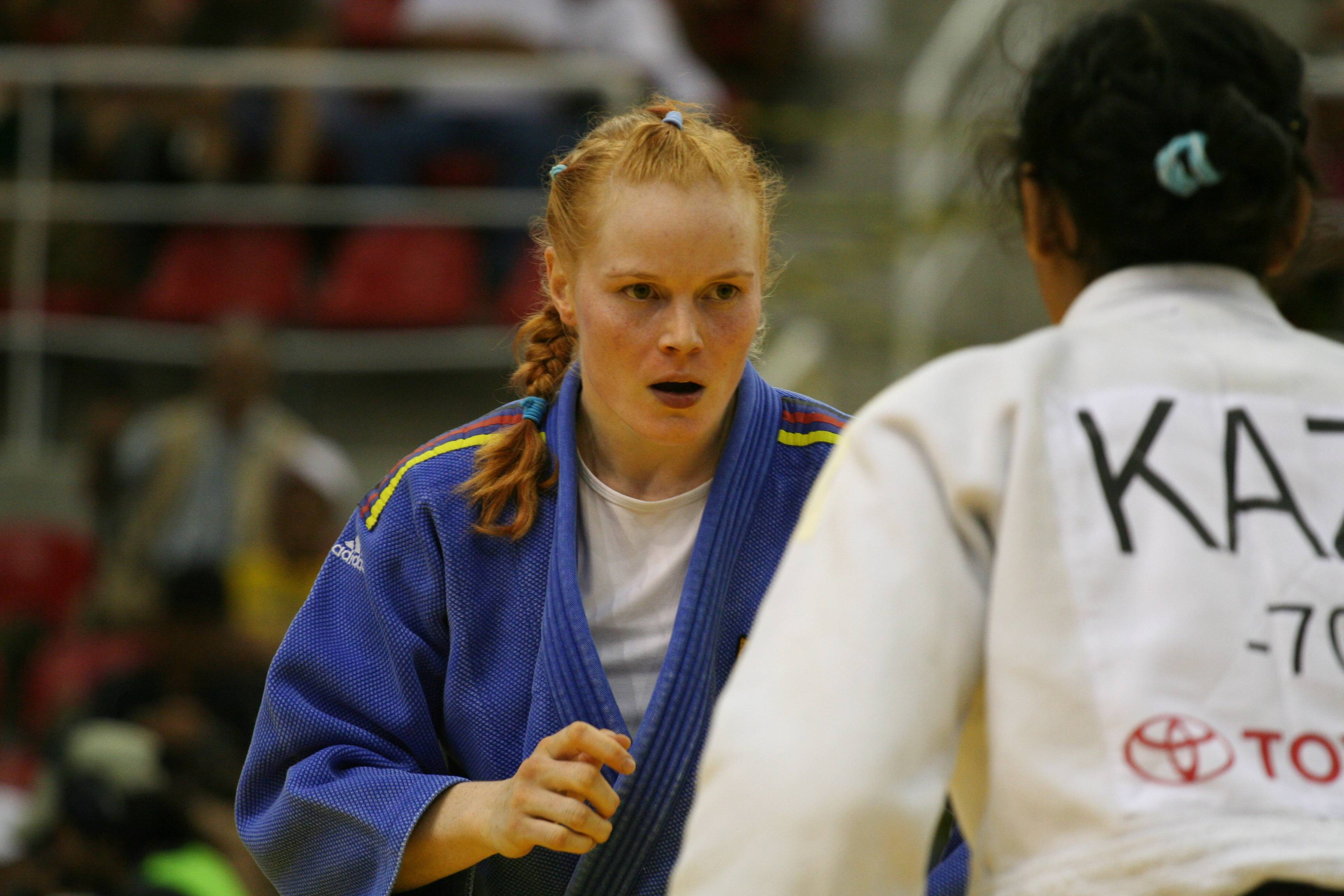
Böhm vs. Zhanar Zhanzunova (KAZ) - Judo WM in Brasilien 2007

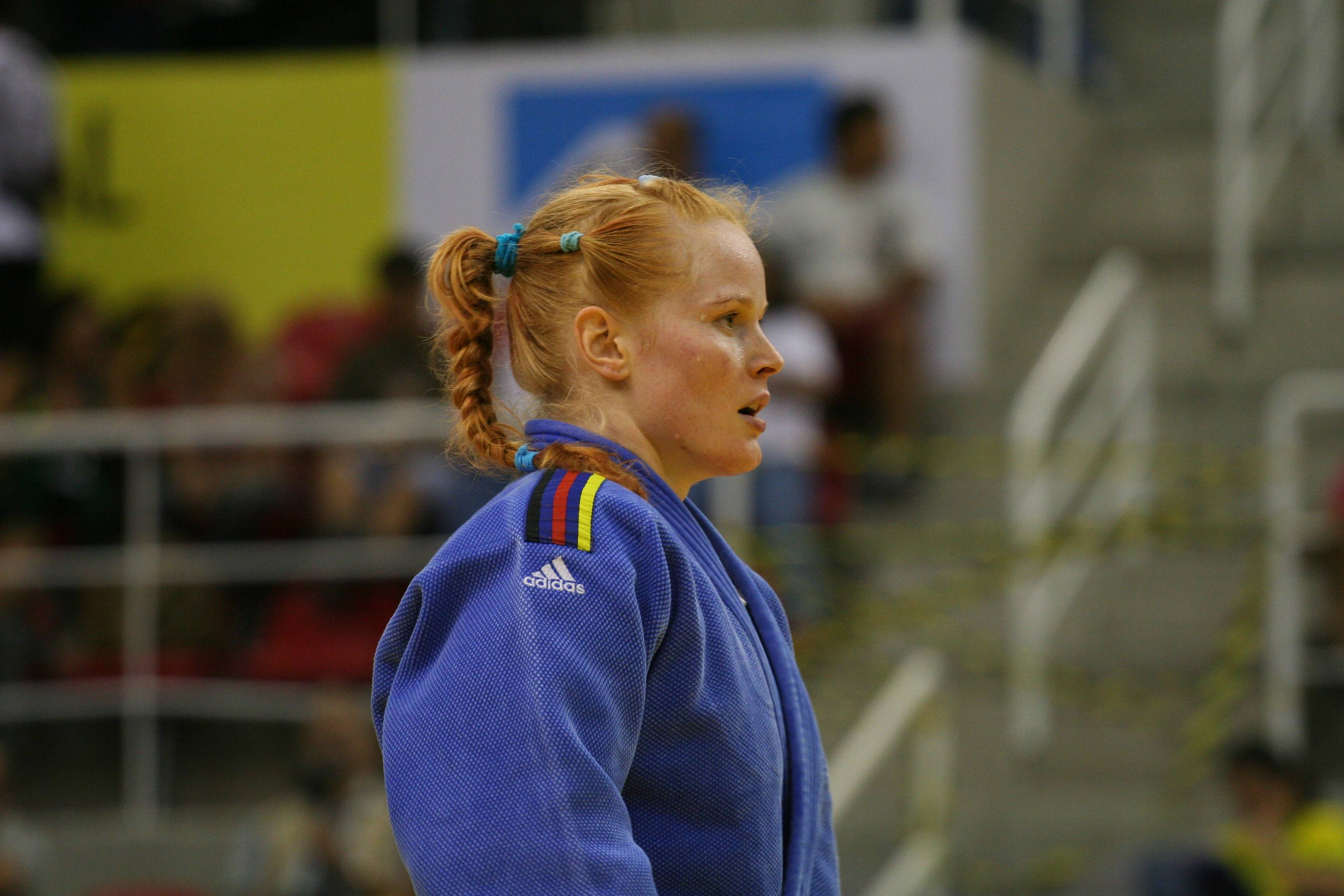
Böhm - Judo World Championships in Brazil 2007

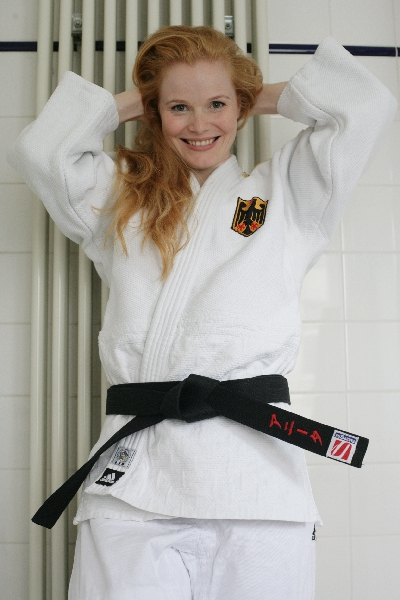

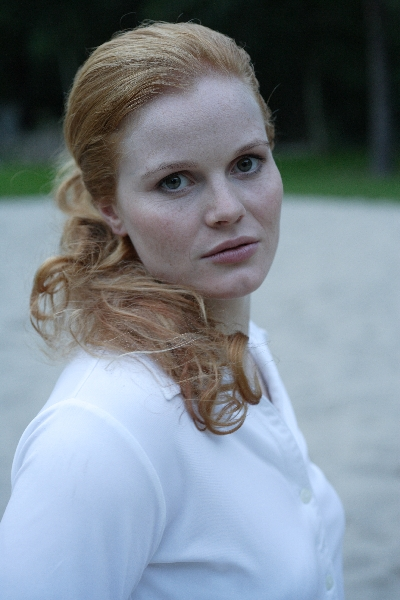

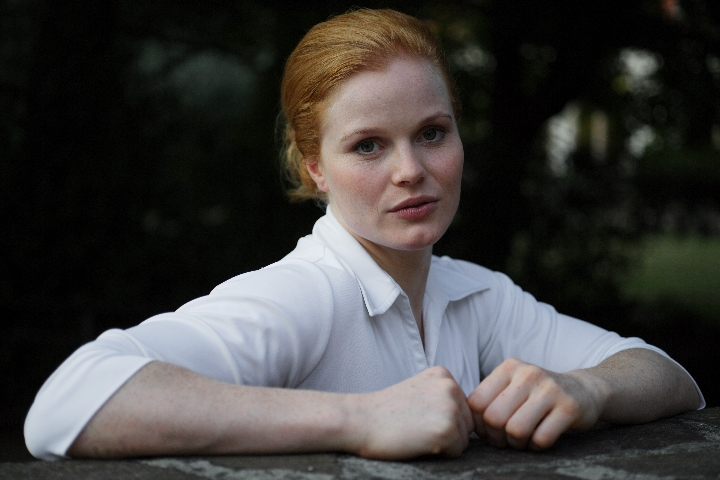
