= Guwanç Nurmuhammedow =

Turkmenistani judoka (born 1976)

Guwanç Nurmuhammedov (also spelled Guvanch; born November 17, 1976) is a male judoka from Turkmenistan. He competed in the 2008 Summer Olympics in Beijing, China, and was the flag-bearer for his nation during the opening ceremony of those games.

Olympic Games
Preceded by Shohrat Kurbanov	Flagbearer for Turkmenistan; Beijing 2008	Succeeded by Serdar Hudaýberdiýew
