= Turkmenistan at the 2016 Summer Olympics =

- IOC code: TKM
- NOC: National Olympic Committee of Turkmenistan

in Rio de Janeiro
- Competitors: 9 in 5 sports
- Flag bearer: Merdan Ataýew
- Medals: Gold 0 Silver 0 Bronze 0 Total 0

Summer Olympics appearances (overview)
- 1996; 2000; 2004; 2008; 2012; 2016; 2020; 2024

Other related appearances
- Russian Empire (1900–1912); Soviet Union (1952–1988); Unified Team (1992)

Turkmenistan competed at the 2016 Summer Olympics in Rio de Janeiro, Brazil, from 5 to 21 August 2016. This was the nation's sixth consecutive appearance at the Summer Olympics in the post-Soviet era.

The National Olympic Committee of Turkmenistan sent a team of nine athletes, four men and five women, to compete in five different sports at the Games. This was also the youngest delegation in Turkmenistan's Olympic history, with more than half of the team under the age of 25, and many of them were expected to reach their peak in time for the 2020 Summer Olympics in Tokyo.

Eight Turkmen athletes made their debut in Rio de Janeiro, with hammer thrower Amanmurad Hommadov headed to his second Games as the oldest and most experienced competitor (aged 29). Meanwhile, breaststroke swimmer Darya Semyonova established history for the Turkmens as the youngest ever Olympian (aged 14), beating the record previously held by Yelena Rojkova twelve years earlier in Athens. Other notable athletes featured world's top-ranked judoka Gulbadam Babamuratova in the women's 52 kg category, and backstroke swimmer Merdan Ataýew, the tallest of the team (standing at 6 ft 5 in), who was selected to become Turkmenistan's flag bearer in the opening ceremony.

Turkmenistan, however, had to wait five more years for its first medal.

== Athletics ==
Turkmenistan has received universality slots from IAAF to send two athletes (one male and one female) to the Olympics.

Key

- Note–Ranks given for track events are within the athlete's heat only
- Q = Qualified for the next round
- q = Qualified for the next round as a fastest loser or, in field events, by position without achieving the qualifying target
- NR = National record
- N/A = Round not applicable for the event
- Bye = Athlete not required to compete in round

Track & road events

Athlete	Event	Heat		Semifinal		Final	
Athlete	Event	Time	Rank	Time	Rank	Time	Rank
Yelena Ryabova	Women's 200 m	25.45	8	Did not advance			

Field events

Athlete	Event	Qualification		Final	
Athlete	Event	Distance	Position	Distance	Position
Amanmurad Hommadov	Men's hammer throw	61.99	30	Did not advance	

== Boxing ==
Turkmenistan has entered one boxer to compete in the men's middleweight division into the Olympic boxing tournament. Arslanbek Achilov had claimed an Olympic spot with a quarterfinal victory at the 2016 AIBA World Qualifying Tournament in Baku, Azerbaijan.

Athlete	Event	Round of 32	Round of 16	Quarterfinals	Semifinals	Final	
Athlete	Event	Opposition Result	Opposition Result	Opposition Result	Opposition Result	Opposition Result	Rank
Arslanbek Achilov	Men's middleweight	Harcsa (HUN); L 1–2	Did not advance				

== Judo ==
Turkmenistan has qualified two judokas for each of the following weight classes at the Games. Gulbadam Babamuratova was ranked among the top 14 eligible judokas for women in the IJF World Ranking List of May 30, 2016, while Rushana Nurjavova at women's lightweight (57 kg) earned a continental quota spot from the Asian region as Turkmenistan's top-ranked judoka outside of direct qualifying position.

Athlete	Event	Round of 32	Round of 16	Quarterfinals	Semifinals	Repechage	Final / BM	
Athlete	Event	Opposition Result	Opposition Result	Opposition Result	Opposition Result	Opposition Result	Opposition Result	Rank
Gulbadam Babamuratova	Women's −52 kg	Gómez (ESP); L 000–101	Did not advance					
Rushana Nurjavova	Women's −57 kg	Karakas (HUN); L 000–101	Did not advance					

== Swimming ==
Turkmenistan has received a Universality invitation from FINA to send two swimmers (one male and one female) to the Olympics.

Athlete	Event	Heat		Semifinal		Final	
Athlete	Event	Time	Rank	Time	Rank	Time	Rank
Merdan Ataýew	Men's 100 m backstroke	56.34 NR	33	Did not advance			
Darya Semyonova	Women's 100 m breaststroke	1:19.84	41	Did not advance			

== Weightlifting ==
Turkmenistan has qualified one male and one female weightlifter for the Rio Olympics by virtue of a top seven national finish (for men) and top six (for women), at the 2016 Asian Championships. The team must allocate these places to individual athletes by June 20, 2016.

Athlete	Event	Snatch		Clean & Jerk		Total	Rank
Athlete	Event	Result	Rank	Result	Rank	Total	Rank
Hojamuhammet Toychiyev	Men's +105 kg	~~193~~	DNF	—	—	—	DNF
Gulnabat Kadyrova	Women's −69 kg	90	14	105	13	195	13
