= Wang Juan (judoka) =

Chinese judoka

Personal information
- Born: 5 March 1982 (age 44)
- Occupation: Judoka

Sport
- Sport: Judo

Profile at external databases
- JudoInside.com: 14049

Wang Juan (born 5 March 1982 in Suzhou, Jiangsu) is a female Chinese judoka who competed in the 2008 Summer Olympics in the Middleweight (63–70 kg) event.

== Major performances ==
- 2001/2005 National Games – 2nd/1st -70 kg class;
- 2007 National Championships – 1st -70 kg class;
- 2007 World Team Championships – 1st;
- 2008 World Cup Budapest – 3rd -70 kg class

== See also ==
- China at the 2008 Summer Olympics
