= Anaysi Hernández =

Cuban judoka (born 1981)

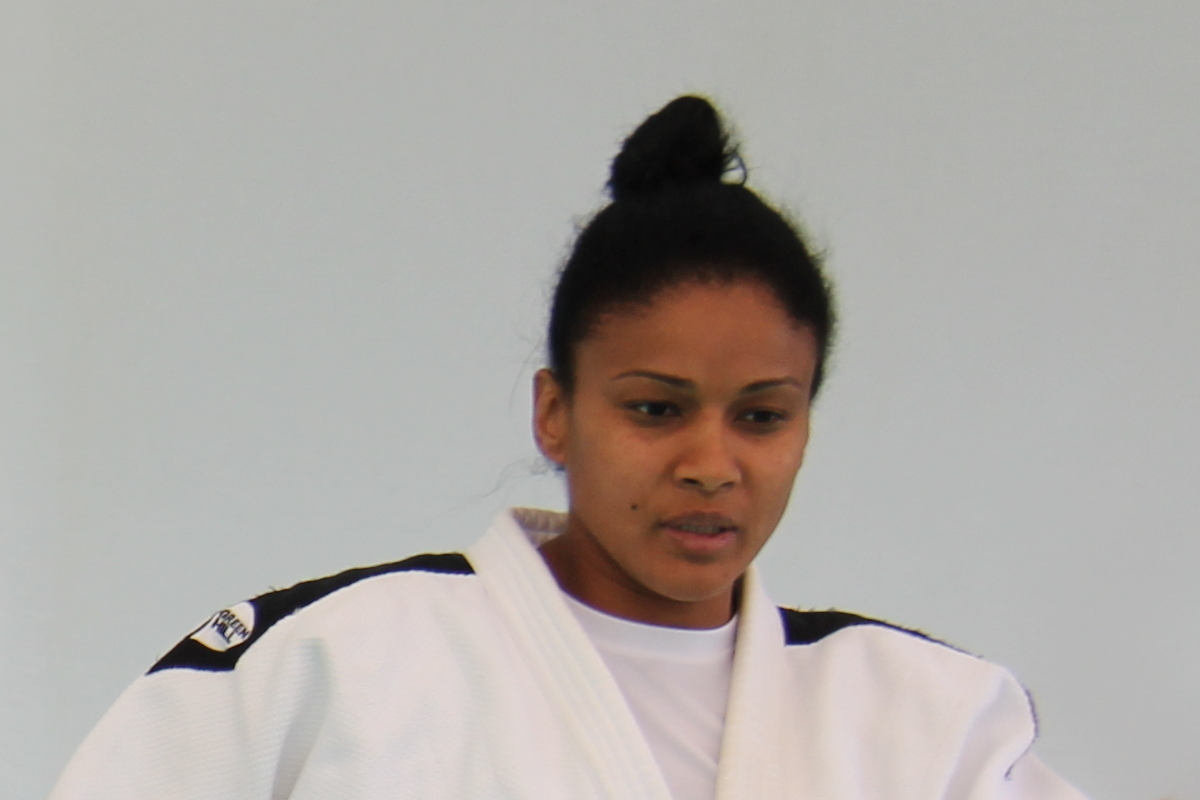

Personal information
- Full name: Anaysi Hernández Sarriá
- Born: 30 August 1981 (age 44) Cienfuegos, Cuba
- Occupation: Judoka
- Height: 170 cm (5 ft 7 in)

Sport
- Country: Cuba
- Sport: Judo
- Weight class: –63 kg, –70 kg

Achievements and titles
- Olympic Games: (silver) (2008)
- World Champ.: (bronze) (2001)
- Pan American Champ.: (2002, 2004)
Medal record
Women's judo
Representing Cuba
Olympic Games
Silver medal – second place	2008 Beijing	‍–‍70 kg
World Championships
Bronze medal – third place	2001 Munich	‍–‍63 kg
Pan American Championships
Gold medal – first place	2002 Santo Domingo	‍–‍63 kg
Gold medal – first place	2004 Isla Margarita	‍–‍70 kg
Silver medal – second place	2001 Cordoba	‍–‍63 kg
World Juniors Championships
Bronze medal – third place	2000 Nabeul	‍–‍63 kg
Summer Universiade
Silver medal – second place	2001 Beijing	‍–‍63 kg

Profile at external databases
- IJF: 48632, 52973
- JudoInside.com: 12062
- Updated on 30 May 2023

Anaysi Hernández Sarriá (Note: In this Spanish name, the first or paternal surname is Hernández and the second or maternal family name is Sarriá.) (also spelled Anaisis, born 30 August 1981) is a Cuban judoka. She won the silver medal in the women's 70kg at the 2008 Summer Olympics.
