= Lea Zahoui Blavo =

Ivorian judoka

Personal information
- Nationality: Ivorian
- Born: 19 April 1975 (age 49)

Sport
- Sport: Judo

Lea Zahoui Blavo (born 19 April 1975) is an Ivorian judoka. She competed in the women's middleweight event at the 2000 Summer Olympics.
