= Turkmenistan at the 2024 Summer Olympics =

- IOC code: TKM
- NOC: National Olympic Committee of Turkmenistan

in Paris, France 26 July 2024 – 11 August 2024
- Competitors: 6 (3 men and 3 women) in 4 sports
- Flag bearers: Serdar Rahimov & Maysa Pardayeva
- Medals: Gold 0 Silver 0 Bronze 0 Total 0

Summer Olympics appearances (overview)
- 1996; 2000; 2004; 2008; 2012; 2016; 2020; 2024

Other related appearances
- Russian Empire (1900–1912); Soviet Union (1952–1988); Unified Team (1992)

Turkmenistan competed at the 2024 Summer Olympics in Paris from 26 July to 11 August 2024. It was the nation's eighth consecutive appearance at the Summer Olympics.

== Competitors ==
The following is the list of number of competitors in the Games.

Sport	Men	Women	Total
Athletics	0	1	1
Judo	1	1	2
Swimming	1	1	2
Weightlifting	1	0	1
Total	3	3	6

== Athletics ==
Turkmenistan sent one sprinter to compete at the 2024 Summer Olympics.

Key

- Note–Ranks given for track events are within the athlete's heat only
- Q = Qualified for the next round
- q = Qualified for the next round as a fastest loser or, in field events, by position without achieving the qualifying target
- NR = National record
- N/A = Round not applicable for the event
- Bye = Athlete not required to compete in round

Track events

Athlete	Event	Preliminary		Heat		Semifinal		Final	
Athlete	Event	Result	Rank	Result	Rank	Result	Rank	Result	Rank
Valentina Meredova	Women's 100 m	12.01 SB q	4	11.95 SB	9	Did Not Advance			

== Judo ==
Turkmenistan qualified two judokas for the following weight classes at the Games. Serdar Rahimov (men's half-lightweight, 66 kg) and Maysa Pardayeva (women's lightweight, 57 kg) got qualified via quota based on IJF World Ranking List and continental quota based on Olympic point rankings.

Athlete	Event	Round of 64	Round of 32	Round of 16	Quarterfinals	Semifinals	Repechage	Final / BM	
Athlete	Event	Opposition Result	Opposition Result	Opposition Result	Opposition Result	Opposition Result	Opposition Result	Opposition Result	Rank
Serdar Rahimov	Men's –66 kg	—N/a	Pedro (ANG); W 10–01	Lima (BRA); L 00–10	Did not advance				
Maysa Pardayeva	Women's –57 kg	—N/a	Cai Q (CHN); W 10–00	Silva (BRA); L 00–10	Did not advance				

== Swimming ==
Turkmenistan sent two swimmers to compete at the 2024 Paris Olympics.

Athlete	Event	Heat		Semifinal		Final	
Athlete	Event	Time	Rank	Time	Rank	Time	Rank
Musa Zhalayev	Men's 100 m freestyle	52.29	61	Did not advance			
Aynura Primova	Women's 100 m backstroke	1:10.17	35	Did not advance			

== Weightlifting ==
Turkmenistan entered one weightlifter into the Olympic competition. Davranbek Hasanbayev (men's 102kg) secured one of the top ten slots in his weight divisions based on the IWF Olympic Qualification Rankings.

Athlete	Event	Snatch		Clean & Jerk		Total	Rank
Athlete	Event	Result	Rank	Result	Rank	Total	Rank
Davranbek Hasanbayev	Men's −102 kg	180	6	190	10	370	10
