= Serdar Hudaýberdiýew =

Turkmen boxer (born 1986)

Arslan Hudayberdiyev
Personal information
- Nationality: (Soviet Union) USSR (1986-1991) Turkmenistan (1991-
- Born: Serdar Hudaýberdiýew; November 1, 1986 (age 39) Türkmenabat, Lebap, Turkmen SSR, USSR
- Height: 1.75 m (5 ft 9 in)
- Weight: 96

Boxing career

Boxing record
- Wins: 3
- Losses: 2
- Draws: 0

Serdar Hudaýberdiýew
Medal record

Representing Turkmenistan

Men's Boxing

Asian Amateur Championships
| Gold medal – first place | 2009 Zhuhai | 60 kg |

Asian Games
| Bronze medal – third place | 2014 Incheon | 69 kg |

Serdar Hudayberdiyev (Turkmen: Serdar Hudaýberdiýew; born 1 November 1986 in Türkmenabat, Lebap, Turkmen SSR) is a Turkmen professional boxer. He competed at the 2012 Summer Olympics in the light welterweight event. He was selected to bear national flag of Turkmenistan sports team at the opening ceremony. Holds the title of Master of Sport of International Class in Turkmenistan.

== Personal life ==
He took up the sport in 1997 in Turkmenabat. Coaches Shohrat Kurbanov, Sabir Kseykhanov and Bayram Burkazov. Currently member of the Higher School of sportsmanship of the State committee of Turkmenistan for tourism and sport. Speaks Russian and Turkmen language. Graduate coaching at National Institute of Sports and Tourism of Turkmenistan.

== Career ==
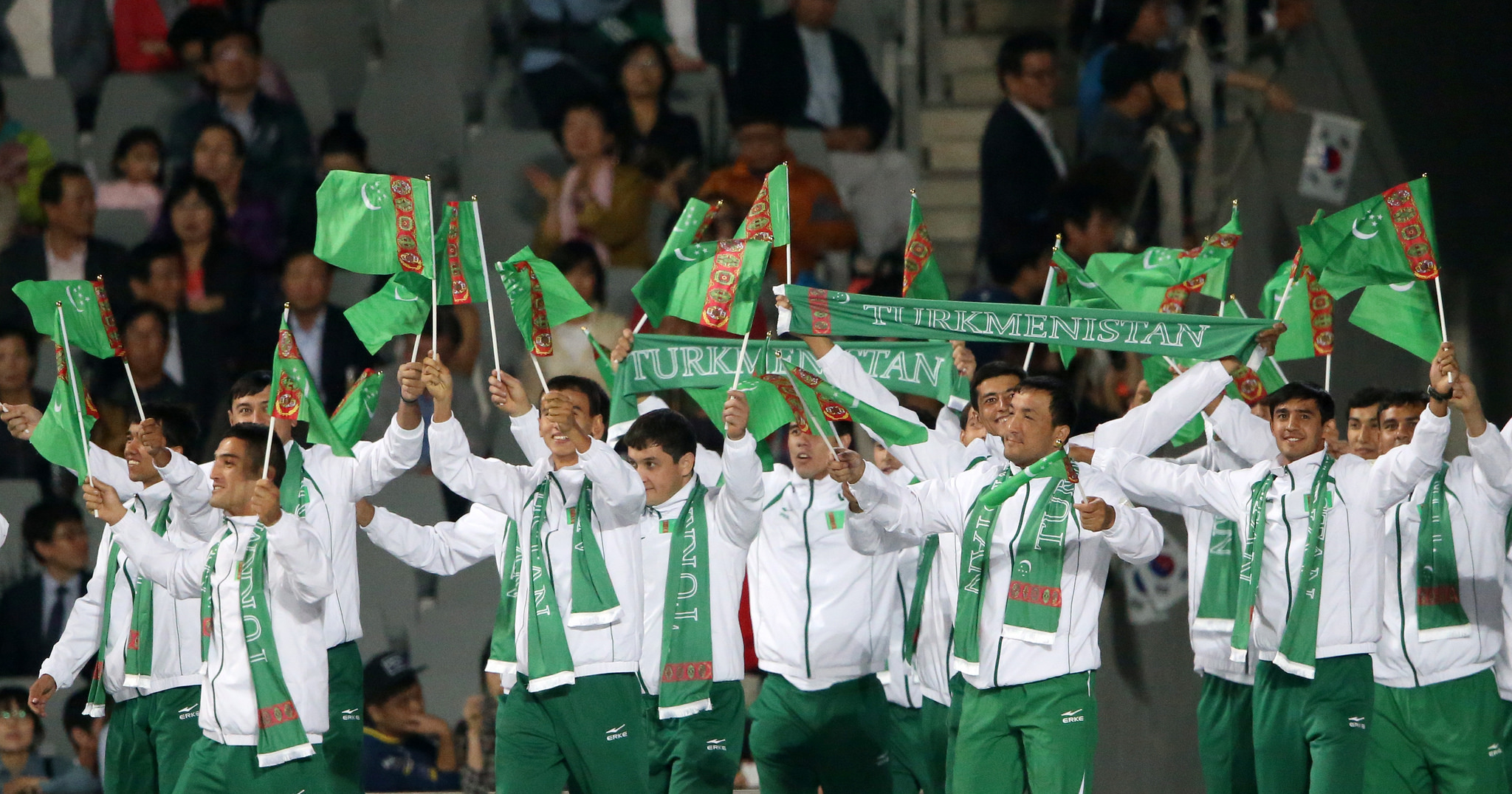
Serdar Hudaýberdiýew at 2014 Asian Games opening ceremony

International debut in 2004 for Turkmenistan, Olympic Qualification Tournament (Pakistan).

He fought a gold medal at the 2009 Asian Amateur Boxing Championships in China. Turkmenistan's first gold medallist in the history of the event.

Was named the 2009 Best Athlete of Turkmenistan by the State Committee of Tourism and Sport.

Was Turkmenistan's representative in the 2010 Asian Games torch relay.

In 2012, he secured a ticket to the Olympics in London at the spring qualifying championship of Asia for men in the weight category up to 64 kg. He was the standard bearer of the National Flag of Turkmenistan at the Olympics 2012. At the Olympics 2012 he was upset in the first bout by Indian boxer Manoj Kumar 7:13.

In 2013, he participated in the World Universiade in Kazan. In the same year at the World Boxing Championship reached the 1/8 finals, losing to Russian boxer Alexander Besputin.

In 2014 at the Asian Games in Incheon won a bronze medal.

=== Professional career ===
In May 2015, Serdar Hudaýberdiýew signed a professional contract with the promotion company Star of David (USA), becoming the first professional boxer from Turkmenistan.

February 6, 2016 in Detroit, he made his debut in professional boxing, which ended with a technical knockout of American Kevin Sheks. On May 14, 2016, Marco Russell (USA) was defeated by a knockout in the second fight. The third fight took place on July 16, 2016 with American Stephen Andrade, and in it by unanimous decision the victory was awarded to the Turkmen boxer.

On June 16, 2017, Hudaýberdiýew had a fourth bout in his professional career, in which, after six rounds, by unanimous decision of the judges, Antonio Uriste (USA) lost. And there were objective reasons for this. A week before the fight, the Turkmen athlete received a serious injury to the carpal-metacarpal joint of the thumb - his thumb and index finger were broken, but Serdar hid this fact before the organizers of the fight. The injury manifested itself during a duel with an experienced rival.

On August 4, 2017, the Turkmen boxer was offered to take revenge from the same opponent. And he agreed, despite the fact that the injury had not yet healed. This was Serdar's fifth bout in a professional career, in which the injury again manifested itself during the second round. Despite this, Hudaýberdiýew lasted all six rounds. However, by the decision of the majority of judges, the victory was awarded to an American boxer.

In July 2019, Serdar Hudaýberdiýew decided to resume his career under the guidance of the coaching staff from the Panama and the manager from Turkmenistan. Currently, the process of weighing is actively underway. According to the program, a Turkmen athlete must lose weight from 96 kg to 75 kg. The fight is scheduled for the autumn, the exact date, the venue and the name of the opponent will be announced in September 2019.

== Professional boxing record ==
| 5 fights | 3 wins | 2 losses |
|---|---|---|
| By knockout | 2 | 0 |
| By decision | 1 | 2 |

| No. | Result | Record | Opponent | Type | Round, time | Date | Location | Notes |
|---|---|---|---|---|---|---|---|---|
| 5 | Loss | 3–2 | (United States) Antonio Urista | MD | 6 (6) | 4 Aug 2017 | MGM Grand Detroit, Detroit, United States | |
| 4 | Loss | 3–1 | (United States) Antonio Urista | UD | 6 | 16 Jun 2017 | Masonic Temple, Detroit, United States | |
| 3 | Win | 3–0 | (United States) Steven Andrade | UD | 4 | 16 Jul 2016 | Masonic Temple, Detroit, United States | |
| 2 | Win | 2–0 | (United States) Marco Russell | KO | 1 (4) | 14 May 2016 | Masonic Temple, Detroit, United States | |
| 1 | Win | 1–0 | (United States) Kevin Shacks | TKO | 4 (4) | 6 Feb 2016 | Masonic Temple, Detroit, United States | |

Olympic Games
| Preceded by Guwanç Nurmuhammedow | Flagbearer for Turkmenistan; London 2012 | Succeeded by Merdan Ataýew |
