= Catherine Jacques =

Belgian Olympic judoka

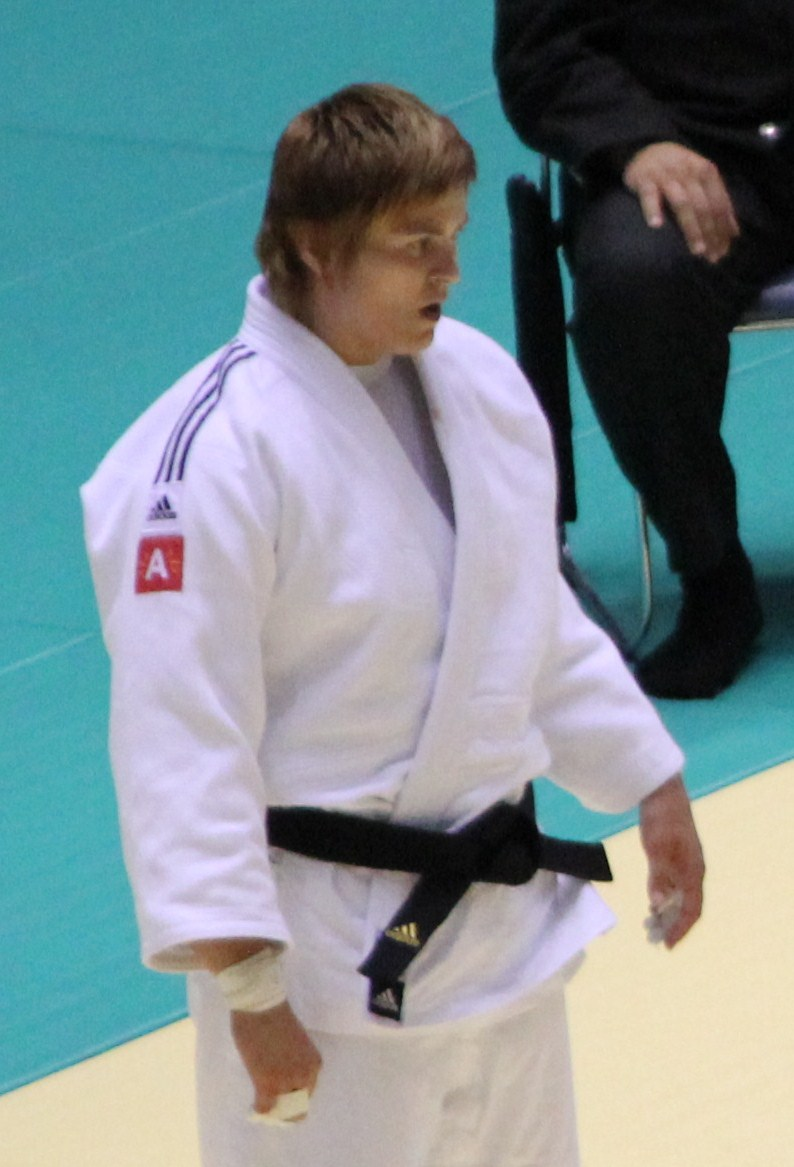
- Catherine Jacques at the 2010 World Judo Championships in Tokyo, Japan

Personal information
- Born: 28 September 1979 (age 46) Merksem, Belgium
- Occupation: Judoka
- Height: 1.77 m (5 ft 10 in)

Sport
- Country: Belgium
- Sport: Judo
- Weight class: ‍–‍70 kg, ‍–‍78 kg

Achievements and titles
- Olympic Games: 5th (2004)
- World Champ.: (bronze) (2005)
- European Champ.: (bronze) (2003, 2005, 2006, 2009)
Medal record
Women's judo
Representing Belgium
World Championships
Bronze medal – third place	2005 Cairo	‍–‍70 kg
European Championships
Bronze medal – third place	2003 Düsseldorf	‍–‍70 kg
Bronze medal – third place	2005 Rotterdam	‍–‍70 kg
Bronze medal – third place	2006 Tampere	‍–‍70 kg
Bronze medal – third place	2009 Tbilisi	‍–‍70 kg
IJF Grand Slam
Silver medal – second place	2010 Tokyo	‍–‍78 kg
IJF Grand Prix
Bronze medal – third place	2009 Hamburg	‍–‍70 kg
Bronze medal – third place	2010 Rotterdam	‍–‍78 kg
World Juniors Championships
Silver medal – second place	1998 Cali	‍–‍70 kg
Bronze medal – third place	1996 Porto	‍–‍72 kg
European Junior Championships
Silver medal – second place	1998 Bucharest	‍–‍70 kg
Bronze medal – third place	1997 Ljubljana	‍–‍66 kg
Summer Universiade
Silver medal – second place	2001 Beijing	‍–‍70 kg

Profile at external databases
- IJF: 323
- JudoInside.com: 171
- Updated on 16 November 2022

Catherine Jacques (born 28 September 1979, in Merksem) is a Belgian judoka who competed in the middleweight category (70 kg). She is a multiple-time national champion, and a four-time bronze medalist for her category at the European Judo Championships. At the 2004 Summer Olympics in Athens, Jacques missed out of the Olympic podium in the women's 70 kg category, after she was defeated by Germany's Annett Böhm, who scored an ippon within thirty-eight seconds, in the bronze medal match. She was able to fight back against her opponent for a rematch to capture the bronze medal, this time at the 2005 World Judo Championships in Cairo, Egypt.

At the 2008 Summer Olympics in Beijing, Jacques qualified again for the 70 kg category. She was eliminated in the second preliminary round, losing out to Italy's Ylenia Scapin, who scored a single yuko point in the match.
