= Sergey Meladze =

Turkmenistani Paralympic powerlifter

Personal information
- Born: 1 April 1980 (age 46) Ashgabat, Turkmenistan

Sport
- Sport: Paralympic powerlifting
Medal record
Representing Turkmenistan
Asian Para Games
| Silver medal – second place | 2014 Incheon | 72kg |
| Bronze medal – third place | 2010 Guangzhou | 67.5kg |
| Bronze medal – third place | 2018 Jakarta | 72kg |

Sergey Meladze (born 1 April 1980) is a Paralympic powerlifter who represented Turkmenistan at the 2012 Summer Paralympics. He won a bronze medal in powerlifting at the 2010 Asian Para Games.
