= Seoi otoshi =

Judo throwing technique

Seoi otoshi 背負落
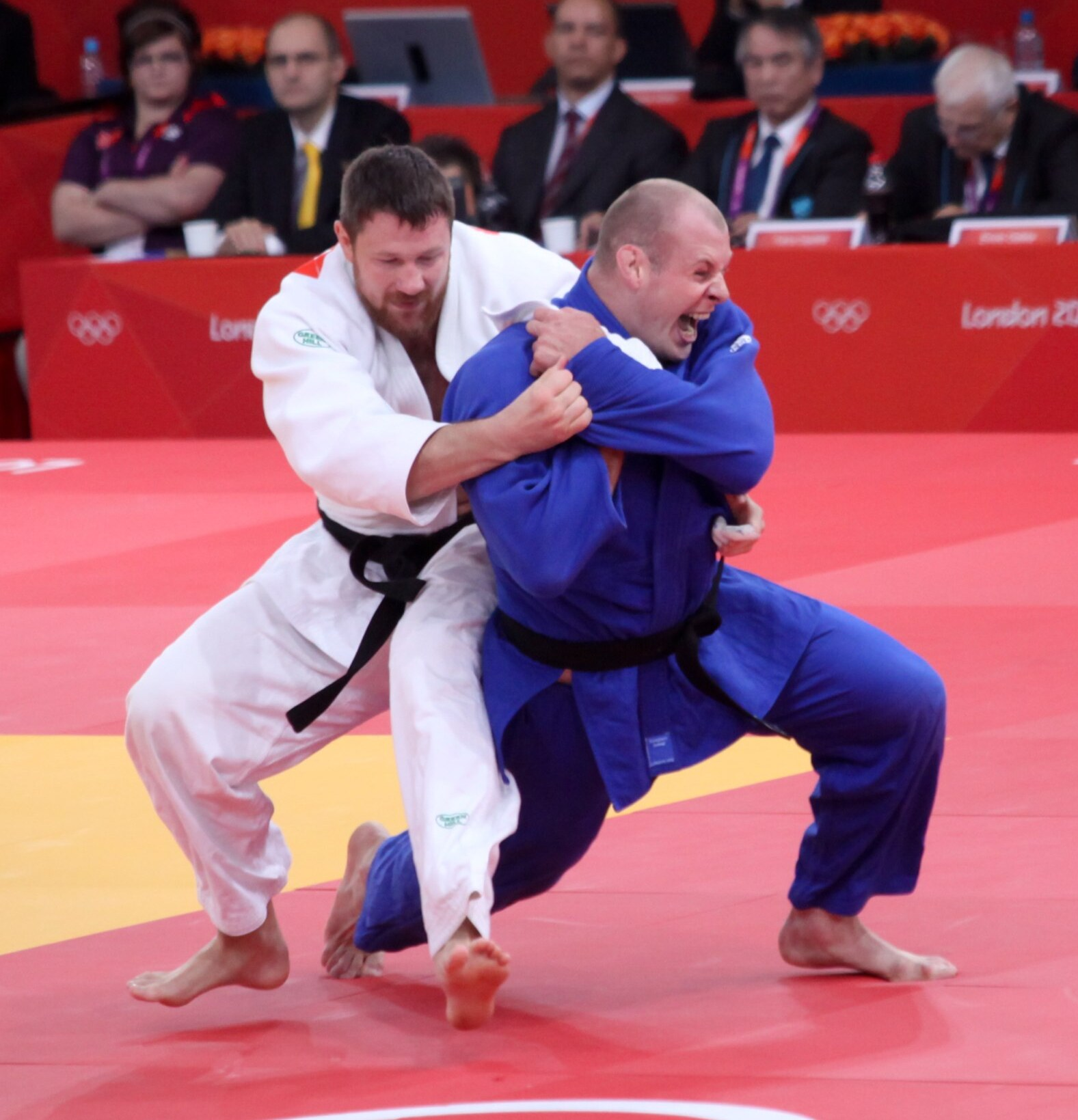
- Seoi otoshi being performed in a judo competition
- Classification: Nage-waza
- Sub classification: Te-waza
- Kodokan: Yes

Technique name
- Rōmaji: Seoi otoshi
- Japanese: 背負落
- English: Shoulder drop
- Korean: 업어 떨어 뜨리기

Seoi otoshi (背負落) ("shoulder drop") is one of the preserved throwing techniques, Habukareta Waza, of Judo. It belonged to the fifth group, Gokyo, of the 1895 Gokyo no Waza lists. It is categorized as a hand technique, Te-waza.

== Description ==
Seoi otoshi begins with one judo player (tori) breaking another's (uke's) balance in the forward, or right front corner direction. Tori turns in for an ippon seoi nage or seoi nage and other.

== Similar techniques ==
=== Tai Otoshi ===
Similar to Tai Otoshi, Ukes movements can be limited or blocked by Toris leg. In Tai Otoshi the leg off Tori can be extended to push uke over. Extension of the leg in Sei Otoshi will rather lead to a lifting effect due to the fixation point of the working hand.

=== Seoi Nage ===
Similar to (Ippon) Seoi nage, Morote Seoi Nage and, Eri Seoi Nage/kata-eri-seoi-nage tori grips the sleeve and lapel on the same side.

=== Ganseki Otoshi ===
In the video, The Essence of Judo, Kyuzo Mifune also demonstrates Ganseki Otoshi (岩石落), where tori grabs hold of uke by the lapels to toss uke over.
