= Polina Guryeva =

Turkmenistani weightlifter (born 1999)

Personal information
- Native name: Polina Gurýewa
- National team: Turkmenistan
- Born: 5 October 1999 (age 27) Ashgabat, Turkmenistan
- Years active: 2011–present

Sport
- Country: Turkmenistan
- Sport: Weightlifting
- Events: 63 kg (2017), 59 kg (2020–)
- Team: National team
Medal record
Representing Turkmenistan
Olympic Games
Silver medal – second place	2020 Tokyo	–59 kg
Islamic Solidarity Games
Gold medal – first place	2017 Baku	63 kg

Polina Aleksandrovna Guryeva (Turkmen: Polina Aleksandrowna Gurýewa, Russian: Полина Александровна Гурьева, born 5 October 1999) is a Turkmenistani weightlifter. She competed at the 2020 Summer Olympics held in Tokyo in 2021 and won a silver medal in the women's 59 kg competition. This was the first ever Olympic medal for Turkmenistan.

She is one of the few Turkmens who won Olympic medals, joining the likes of the late Marat Nyýazow (who represented the USSR at the 1960 Olympics in Rome) and Daniyar İsmayilov (an ethnic Turkmen who represents Turkey).

== Early life ==
Guryeva was born on 5 October 1999 in Ashgabat. She is ethnic Russian. She started to do artistic gymnastics in 2011 in Ashgabat, and eventually moved to weightlifting.

Guryeva is a student of the Turkmen State Institute of Physical Culture and Sports. She lives and trains in Ashgabat; her coach as of 2021 was Artur Emiryan.

For winning the first Olympic medal, the Turkmen State presented Polina Guryeva with a Lexus LX570 Sport Plus car, a new three-room apartment and 50 thousand US dollars.

== Major results ==
Year	Venue	Weight	Snatch (kg)				Clean & Jerk (kg)				Total	Rank
Year	Venue	Weight	1	2	3	Rank	1	2	3	Rank	Total	Rank
Olympic Games
2021	Tokyo, Japan	59 kg	93	~~95~~	96	3	116	119	121	2	217	2nd place, silver medalist(s)

== State awards ==
- Honored Master of Sports of Turkmenistan (August 21, 2021)
