= Catherine Arlove =

Australian judoka (born 1971)

Personal information
- Born: Malvern, Victoria, Australia
- Height
- Weight

Sport
- Sport: Judo
- Club: Caulfield Judo Club

Catherine Arlove (born 5 February 1971 in Malvern, Victoria) is an Australian judoka who has also represented Australia in wrestling and competed at a national level in cycling. Arlove has won ten Gold medals at the Australian National Judo Championships.

She competed in judo at the 2000, 2004 and 2008 Olympics with her best result being a fourth placing in the 63 kg class at the Athens Games. She also competed in the third season of Gladiators, coming runner-up to Marissa Huettner.
