= National Olympic Committee of Turkmenistan =

National Olympic Committee

- Country: Turkmenistan
- Code: TKM
- Created: 1990
- Recognized: 1993
- Continental Association: OCA
- President: Serdar Berdimuhamedow
- Secretary General: Ata Akmämmedow
- Website: olympic.tm/en

The National Olympic Committee of Turkmenistan (Turkmen: Türkmenistanyň Milli Olimpiýa Komiteti; IOC code: TKM) is the National Olympic Committee representing Turkmenistan. It is led by the President of Turkmenistan, Serdar Berdimuhamedow. The headquarters of the committee is in the capital city of Ashgabat.

Turkmenistan made its debut as an independent nation at the 1996 Olympic Games in Atlanta, United States. The 2020 Tokyo Olympic Games marked the country's first Olympic medal wins, with Polina Gurýewa winning silver in the Weightlifting 59 kg category.
