= List of World Judo Championships medalists =

World Judo Championships
- Current event or competition: 2026 World Judo Championships

Competition details
- Discipline: Judo
- Type: Annual
- Organiser: IJF

History
- First edition: (Japan) Tokyo 1956
- Editions: 36 Men's, 27 Women's, 3 Open
- Most wins: Japan – 407 medals (176 golds)
- Most recent: (Azerbaijan) 2026

The following is the list of World Judo Championships medalists in the sport of judo.

== Men ==
=== Extra Lightweight ===
- 60 kg

Year	Gold	Silver	Bronze	
(France) 1979	(France) Thierry Rey	(South Korea) Gwak U-jong	(Italy) Felice Mariani	(Japan) Yasuhiko Moriwaki
(Netherlands) 1981	(Japan) Yasuhiko Moriwaki	(Czechoslovakia) Pavel Petřikov	(Italy) Felice Mariani	(Canada) Phil Takahashi
(Soviet Union) 1983	(Soviet Union) Khazret Tletseri	(Hungary) Tamás Bujkó	(Japan) Kenichi Haraguchi	(East Germany) Klaus-Peter Stollberg
(South Korea) 1985	(Japan) Shinji Hosokawa	(West Germany) Peter Jupke	(Hungary) Tamás Bujkó	(Soviet Union) Khazret Tletseri
(West Germany) 1987	(South Korea) Kim Jae-yup	(Japan) Shinji Hosokawa	(United States) Kevin Asano	(France) Patrick Roux
(Socialist Federal Republic of Yugoslavia) 1989	(Soviet Union) Amiran Totikashvili	(Japan) Tadanori Koshino	(Mongolia) Dashgombyn Battulga	(South Korea) Yoon Hyun
(Spain) 1991	(Japan) Tadanori Koshino	(South Korea) Yoon Hyun	(Soviet Union) Nazim Huseynov	(France) Philippe Pradayrol
(Canada) 1993	(Japan) Ryuji Sonoda	(Azerbaijan) Nazim Huseynov	(Germany) Richard Trautmann	(Georgia (country)) Giorgi Vazagashvili
(Japan) 1995	(Russia) Nikolay Ozhegin	(Georgia (country)) Giorgi Vazagashvili	(Japan) Ryuji Sonoda	(Belarus) Natik Bagirov
(France) 1997	(Japan) Tadahiro Nomura	(Georgia (country)) Giorgi Revazishvili	(Brazil) Fúlvio Miyata	(Belgium) Cédric Taymans
(United Kingdom) 1999	(Cuba) Manolo Poulot	(Japan) Kazuhiko Tokuno	(Belarus) Natik Bagirov	(Georgia (country)) Nestor Khergiani
(Germany) 2001	(Tunisia) Anis Lounifi	(Belgium) Cédric Taymans	(Japan) Kazuhiko Tokuno	(United Kingdom) John Buchanan
(Japan) 2003	(South Korea) Choi Min-ho	(United Kingdom) Craig Fallon	(Japan) Tadahiro Nomura	(Tunisia) Anis Lounifi
(Egypt) 2005	(United Kingdom) Craig Fallon	(Austria) Ludwig Paischer	(Azerbaijan) Nijat Shikhalizada	(South Korea) Cho Nam-suk
(Brazil) 2007	(Netherlands) Ruben Houkes	(Georgia (country)) Nestor Khergiani	(Austria) Ludwig Paischer	(South Korea) Choi Min-Ho
(Netherlands) 2009	(Ukraine) Georgii Zantaraia	(Japan) Hiroaki Hiraoka	(Armenia) Hovhannes Davtyan	(Italy) Elio Verde
(Japan) 2010	(Uzbekistan) Rishod Sobirov	(Ukraine) Georgii Zantaraia	(Japan) Hiroaki Hiraoka	(Russia) Arsen Galstyan
(France) 2011	(Uzbekistan) Rishod Sobirov	(Japan) Hiroaki Hiraoka	(Azerbaijan) Ilgar Mushkiyev	(Ukraine) Georgii Zantaraia
(Brazil) 2013	(Japan) Naohisa Takatō	(Mongolia) Dashdavaagiin Amartüvshin	(South Korea) Kim Won-jin	(Azerbaijan) Orkhan Safarov
(Russia) 2014	(Mongolia) Ganbatyn Boldbaatar	(Russia) Beslan Mudranov	(Georgia (country)) Amiran Papinashvili	(Japan) Naohisa Takatō
(Kazakhstan) 2015	(Kazakhstan) Yeldos Smetov	(Kazakhstan) Rustam Ibrayev	(Japan) Toru Shishime	(South Korea) Kim Won-jin
(Hungary) 2017	(Japan) Naohisa Takatō	(Azerbaijan) Orkhan Safarov	(Mongolia) Ganbatyn Boldbaatar	(Uzbekistan) Diyorbek Urozboev
(Azerbaijan) 2018	(Japan) Naohisa Takatō	(Russia) Robert Mshvidobadze	(Georgia (country)) Amiran Papinashvili	(Japan) Ryuju Nagayama
(Japan) 2019	(Georgia (country)) Lukhumi Chkhvimiani	(Uzbekistan) Sharafuddin Lutfillaev	(Kazakhstan) Yeldos Smetov	(Japan) Ryuju Nagayama
(Hungary) 2021	(Russia) Yago Abuladze (Note: At the 2021 World Championships, in accordance with a ban by the World Anti-Doping Agency (WADA) and a decision by the Court of Arbitration for Sport (CAS), judokas from Russia were not permitted to use the Russian name, flag, or anthem. They instead participated as "the team of the Russian Judo Federation (RJF)", and used the flag of the Russian Olympic Committee.)	(Kazakhstan) Gusman Kyrgyzbayev	(Azerbaijan) Karamat Huseynov	(Spain) Francisco Garrigós
(Uzbekistan) 2022	(Japan) Naohisa Takatō	(Mongolia) Enkhtaivany Ariunbold	(Kazakhstan) Yeldos Smetov	(Chinese Taipei) Yang Yung-wei
(Qatar) 2023	(Spain) Francisco Garrigós	(Uzbekistan) Dilshodbek Baratov	(Georgia (country)) Giorgi Sardalashvili	(South Korea) Lee Ha-rim
(United Arab Emirates) 2024	(Georgia (country)) Giorgi Sardalashvili	(Chinese Taipei) Yang Yung-wei	(Japan) Taiki Nakamura	(South Korea) Lee Ha-rim
(Hungary) 2025	(Japan) Ryuju Nagayama	(France) Romain Valadier-Picard	(Mongolia) Kazirbekiin Yolk	Ayub Bliev
(Azerbaijan) 2026	(Azerbaijan) Ahmad Yusifov	(Kazakhstan) Sherzod Davlatov	(Georgia (country)) Giorgi Sardalashvili	(Japan) Ryuju Nagayama

=== Half Lightweight ===
- 65 kg (1979–1997)
- 66 kg (1999–)

Year	Gold	Silver	Bronze	
(France) 1979	(Soviet Union) Nikolay Solodukhin	(France) Yves Delvingt	(Poland) Janusz Pawłowski	(Japan) Kyosuke Sahara
(Netherlands) 1981	(Japan) Katsuhiko Kashiwazaki	(Romania) Constantin Niculae	(South Korea) Hwang Jung-oh	(Soviet Union) Petr Ponomarev
(Soviet Union) 1983	(Soviet Union) Nikolay Solodukhin	(Japan) Yoshiyuki Matsuoka	(Poland) Janusz Pawłowski	(Italy) Sandro Rosati
(South Korea) 1985	(Soviet Union) Yury Sokolov	(South Korea) Lee Kyung-keun	(Japan) Yoshiyuki Matsuoka	(United Kingdom) Stephen Gawthorpe
(West Germany) 1987	(Japan) Yōsuke Yamamoto	(Soviet Union) Yury Sokolov	(Poland) Janusz Pawłowski	(Hungary) Tamás Bujkó
(Socialist Federal Republic of Yugoslavia) 1989	(Socialist Federal Republic of Yugoslavia) Dragomir Bečanović	(East Germany) Udo Quellmalz	(Soviet Union) Sergei Kosmynin	(France) Bruno Carabetta
(Spain) 1991	(Germany) Udo Quellmalz	(Japan) Masahiko Okuma	(Soviet Union) Sergei Kosmynin	(United States) Jimmy Pedro
(Canada) 1993	(Japan) Yukimasa Nakamura	(Switzerland) Eric Born	(Russia) Sergei Kosmynin	(Germany) Udo Quellmalz
(Japan) 1995	(Germany) Udo Quellmalz	(Japan) Yukimasa Nakamura	(South Korea) Kim Dae-ik	(Turkey) Bektaş Demirel
(France) 1997	(South Korea) Kim Hyuk	(France) Larbi Benboudaoud	(Georgia (country)) Giorgi Vazagashvili	(Moldova) Victor Bivol
(United Kingdom) 1999	(France) Larbi Benboudaoud	(Turkey) Hüseyin Özkan	(Netherlands) Patrick van Kalken	(Cuba) Yordanis Arencibia
(Germany) 2001	(Iran) Arash Miresmaeili	(Ukraine) Musa Nastuyev	(South Korea) Kim Hyung-ju	(Cuba) Yordanis Arencibia
(Japan) 2003	(Iran) Arash Miresmaeili	(France) Larbi Benboudaoud	(Russia) Magomed Dzhafarov	(Cuba) Yordanis Arencibia
(Egypt) 2005	(Brazil) João Derly	(Japan) Masato Uchishiba	(Iran) Arash Miresmaeili	(Hungary) Miklós Ungvári
(Brazil) 2007	(Brazil) João Derly	(Cuba) Yordanis Arencibia	(Iran) Arash Miresmaeili	(Hungary) Miklós Ungvári
(Netherlands) 2009	(Mongolia) Khashbaataryn Tsagaanbaatar	(Spain) Sugoi Uriarte	(South Korea) An Jeong-hwan	(Hungary) Miklós Ungvári
(Japan) 2010	(Japan) Junpei Morishita	(Brazil) Leandro Cunha	(Mongolia) Khashbaataryn Tsagaanbaatar	(France) Loïc Korval
(France) 2011	(Japan) Masashi Ebinuma	(Brazil) Leandro Cunha	(South Korea) Cho Jun-ho	(Russia) Musa Mogushkov
(Brazil) 2013	(Japan) Masashi Ebinuma	(Kazakhstan) Azamat Mukanov	(Japan) Masaaki Fukuoka	(Ukraine) Georgii Zantaraia
(Russia) 2014	(Japan) Masashi Ebinuma	(Russia) Mikhail Pulyaev	(Russia) Kamal Khan-Magomedov	(Ukraine) Georgii Zantaraia
(Kazakhstan) 2015	(South Korea) An Ba-ul	(Russia) Mikhail Pulyaev	(Israel) Golan Pollack	(Uzbekistan) Rishod Sobirov
(Hungary) 2017	(Japan) Hifumi Abe	(Russia) Mikhail Pulyaev	(Israel) Tal Flicker	(Georgia (country)) Vazha Margvelashvili
(Azerbaijan) 2018	(Japan) Hifumi Abe	(Kazakhstan) Yerlan Serikzhanov	(South Korea) An Ba-ul	(Ukraine) Georgii Zantaraia
(Japan) 2019	(Japan) Joshiro Maruyama	(South Korea) Kim Lim-hwan	(Japan) Hifumi Abe	(Moldova) Denis Vieru
(Hungary) 2021	(Japan) Joshiro Maruyama	(Italy) Manuel Lombardo	(Russia) Yakub Shamilov	(Mongolia) Yondonperenlein Baskhüü
(Uzbekistan) 2022	(Japan) Hifumi Abe	(Japan) Joshiro Maruyama	(South Korea) An Ba-ul	(Moldova) Denis Vieru
(Qatar) 2023	(Japan) Hifumi Abe	(Japan) Joshiro Maruyama	(France) Walide Khyar	(Mongolia) Yondonperenlein Baskhüü
(United Arab Emirates) 2024	(Japan) Ryoma Tanaka	(Japan) Takeshi Takeoka	(Finland) Luukas Saha	(Georgia (country)) Vazha Margvelashvili
(Hungary) 2025	(Japan) Takeshi Takeoka	(Tajikistan) Nurali Emomali	(Japan) Hifumi Abe	(Tajikistan) Obid Dzhebov
(Azerbaijan) 2026	(Japan) Hifumi Abe	(Spain) David García Torné	(Japan) Takeshi Takeoka	(Moldova) Denis Vieru

=== Lightweight ===
- 68 kg (1965)
- 63 kg (1967–1975)
- 71 kg (1979–1997)
- 73 kg (1999–)

Year	Gold	Silver	Bronze	
(Brazil) 1965	(Japan) Hirofumi Matsuda	(Japan) Hiroshi Minatoya	(Soviet Union) Oleg Stepanov	(South Korea) Park Keil-soon
(United States) 1967	(Japan) Takafumi Shigeoka	(Japan) Hirofumi Matsuda	(Soviet Union) Sergey Suslin	(South Korea) Kim Byung-sik
(Mexico) 1969	(Japan) Yoshio Sonoda	(Japan) Toyokazu Nomura	(Soviet Union) Sergey Suslin	(South Korea) Kim Sang-chul
(West Germany) 1971	(Japan) Takao Kawaguchi	(Japan) Toyokazu Nomura	(Soviet Union) Sergey Suslin	(South Korea) Choi Jong-sam
(Switzerland) 1973	(Japan) Yoshiharu Minami	(Japan) Takao Kawaguchi	(Soviet Union) Shengeli Pitskhelauri	(Cuba) Héctor Rodríguez
(Austria) 1975	(Japan) Yoshiharu Minami	(Japan) Katsuhiko Kashiwazaki	(Italy) Felice Mariani	(East Germany) Torsten Reißmann
(France) 1979	(Japan) Kiyoto Katsuki	(Italy) Ezio Gamba	(United Kingdom) Neil Adams	(Soviet Union) Tamaz Namgalauri
(Netherlands) 1981	(South Korea) Park Chong-hak	(France) Serge Dyot	(East Germany) Karl-Heinz Lehmann	(Socialist Federal Republic of Yugoslavia) Vojislav Vujević
(Soviet Union) 1983	(Japan) Hidetoshi Nakanishi	(Italy) Ezio Gamba	(Soviet Union) Tamaz Namgalauri	(West Germany) Steffen Stranz
(South Korea) 1985	(South Korea) Ahn Byeong-keun	(United States) Mike Swain	(Poland) Wiesław Błach	(West Germany) Steffen Stranz
(West Germany) 1987	(United States) Mike Swain	(France) Marc Alexandre	(United Kingdom) Kerrith Brown	(Japan) Toshihiko Koga
(Socialist Federal Republic of Yugoslavia) 1989	(Japan) Toshihiko Koga	(United States) Mike Swain	(Soviet Union) Giorgi Tenadze	(North Korea) Li Chang-su
(Spain) 1991	(Japan) Toshihiko Koga	(Spain) Joaquín Ruiz	(Soviet Union) Vladimeri Dgebuadze	(South Korea) Chung Hoon
(Canada) 1993	(South Korea) Chung Hoon	(Hungary) Bertalan Hajtós	(Brazil) Rogério Sampaio	(Japan) Daisuke Hideshima
(Japan) 1995	(Japan) Daisuke Hideshima	(South Korea) Kwak Dae-sung	(Italy) Diego Brambilla	(United States) Jimmy Pedro
(France) 1997	(Japan) Kenzo Nakamura	(France) Christophe Gagliano	(Portugal) Guilherme Bentes	(Latvia) Vsevolods Zeļonijs
(United Kingdom) 1999	(United States) Jimmy Pedro	(Russia) Vitaly Makarov	(Brazil) Sebastian Pereira	(Georgia (country)) Giorgi Revazishvili
(Germany) 2001	(Russia) Vitaly Makarov	(Japan) Yusuke Kanamaru	(Kazakhstan) Askhat Shakharov	(Poland) Krzysztof Wiłkomirski
(Japan) 2003	(South Korea) Lee Won-hee	(France) Daniel Fernandes	(Portugal) João Neto	(Russia) Vitaly Makarov
(Egypt) 2005	(Hungary) Ákos Braun	(Italy) Francesco Bruyere	(Spain) Kiyoshi Uematsu	(Ukraine) Gennadiy Bilodid
(Brazil) 2007	(South Korea) Wang Ki-chun	(Azerbaijan) Elnur Mammadli	(Japan) Yusuke Kanamaru	(Tajikistan) Rasul Boqiev
(Netherlands) 2009	(South Korea) Wang Ki-chun	(North Korea) Kim Chol-su	(Russia) Mansur Isaev	(Belgium) Dirk Van Tichelt
(Japan) 2010	(Japan) Hiroyuki Akimoto	(Netherlands) Dex Elmont	(South Korea) Wang Ki-chun	(Japan) Yasuhiro Awano
(France) 2011	(Japan) Riki Nakaya	(Netherlands) Dex Elmont	(France) Ugo Legrand	(Uzbekistan) Navruz Jurakobilov
(Brazil) 2013	(Japan) Shohei Ono	(France) Ugo Legrand	(Netherlands) Dex Elmont	(Belgium) Dirk Van Tichelt
(Russia) 2014	(Japan) Riki Nakaya	(North Korea) Hong Kuk-hyon	(Russia) Musa Mogushkov	(United Arab Emirates) Victor Scvortov
(Kazakhstan) 2015	(Japan) Shohei Ono	(Japan) Riki Nakaya	(Mongolia) Sainjargalyn Nyam-Ochir	(South Korea) An Chang-rim
(Hungary) 2017	(Japan) Soichi Hashimoto	(Azerbaijan) Rustam Orujov	(Mongolia) Ganbaataryn Odbayar	(South Korea) An Chang-rim
(Azerbaijan) 2018	(South Korea) An Chang-rim	(Japan) Soichi Hashimoto	(Azerbaijan) Hidayat Heydarov	(Iran) Mohammad Mohammadi
(Japan) 2019	(Japan) Shohei Ono	(Azerbaijan) Rustam Orujov	(Azerbaijan) Hidayat Heydarov	(Russia) Denis Iartsev
(Hungary) 2021	(Georgia (country)) Lasha Shavdatuashvili	(Sweden) Tommy Macias	(Japan) Soichi Hashimoto	(Turkey) Bilal Çiloğlu
(Uzbekistan) 2022	(Mongolia) Tsend-Ochiryn Tsogtbaatar	(Japan) Soichi Hashimoto	(Azerbaijan) Hidayat Heydarov	(Brazil) Daniel Cargnin
(Qatar) 2023	(Switzerland) Nils Stump	(Italy) Manuel Lombardo	(Japan) Soichi Hashimoto	(Uzbekistan) Murodjon Yuldoshev
(United Arab Emirates) 2024	(Azerbaijan) Hidayat Heydarov	(Japan) Tatsuki Ishihara	(Switzerland) Nils Stump	(Mongolia) Lavjargalyn Ankhzayaa
(Hungary) 2025	(France) Joan-Benjamin Gaba	(Brazil) Daniel Cargnin	(Japan) Tatsuki Ishihara	(United Arab Emirates) Makhmadbek Makhmadbekov
(Azerbaijan) 2026	(Japan) Ryuga Tanaka	(United Arab Emirates) Makhmadbek Makhmadbekov	(Azerbaijan) Rashid Mammadaliyev	(France) Dayyan Boulemtafes

=== Half Middleweight ===
- 70 kg (1967–1975)
- 78 kg (1979–1997)
- 81 kg (1999–)

Year	Gold	Silver	Bronze	
(United States) 1967	(Japan) Hiroshi Minatoya	(South Korea) Park Kil-sun	(Japan) Takehide Nakatani	(South Korea) Park Cheong-sam
(Mexico) 1969	(Japan) Hiroshi Minatoya	(Japan) Yoshimitsu Kono	(Soviet Union) David Rudman	(South Korea) Kim Chil-bok
(West Germany) 1971	(Japan) Hideki Tsuzawa	(Japan) Hiroshi Minatoya	(East Germany) Dietmar Hötger	(Poland) Antoni Zajkowski
(Switzerland) 1973	(Japan) Toyokazu Nomura	(East Germany) Dietmar Hötger	(Soviet Union) Anatoliy Novikov	(Japan) Kazuo Yoshimura
(Austria) 1975	(Soviet Union) Vladimir Nevzorov	(Soviet Union) Valeriy Dvoynikov	(Japan) Katsunori Akimoto	(Japan) Koji Kuramoto
(France) 1979	(Japan) Shōzō Fujii	(France) Bernard Tchoullouyan	(East Germany) Harald Heinke	(South Korea) Park Young-chul
(Netherlands) 1981	(United Kingdom) Neil Adams	(Japan) Jiro Kase	(Canada) Kevin Doherty	(Bulgaria) Georgi Petrov
(Soviet Union) 1983	(Japan) Nobutoshi Hikage	(United Kingdom) Neil Adams	(Romania) Mircea Frățică	(Soviet Union) Shota Khabareli
(South Korea) 1985	(Japan) Nobutoshi Hikage	(East Germany) Torsten Bréchôt	(United Kingdom) Neil Adams	(Soviet Union) Vladimir Shestakov
(West Germany) 1987	(Japan) Hirotaka Okada	(Soviet Union) Bashir Varaev	(South Korea) Lee Koai-hwa	(Poland) Waldemar Legień
(Socialist Federal Republic of Yugoslavia) 1989	(South Korea) Kim Byung-joo	(Japan) Tatsuto Mochida	(Soviet Union) Bashir Varaev	(Poland) Waldemar Legień
(Spain) 1991	(Germany) Daniel Lascau	(Belgium) Johan Laats	(Soviet Union) Bashir Varaev	(Japan) Hidehiko Yoshida
(Canada) 1993	(South Korea) Jeon Ki-young	(Japan) Hidehiko Yoshida	(United States) Jason Morris	(France) Darcel Yandzi
(Japan) 1995	(Japan) Toshihiko Koga	(Israel) Oren Smadja	(Austria) Patrick Reiter	(France) Djamel Bouras
(France) 1997	(South Korea) Cho In-chul	(France) Djamel Bouras	(Austria) Patrick Reiter	(North Korea) Kwak Ok-chol
(United Kingdom) 1999	(United Kingdom) Graeme Randall	(Uzbekistan) Farkhod Turayev	(South Korea) Cho In-chul	(North Korea) Kwak Ok-chol
(Germany) 2001	(South Korea) Cho In-chul	(Estonia) Aleksei Budõlin	(Switzerland) Sergei Aschwanden	(Azerbaijan) Elkhan Rajabli
(Japan) 2003	(Germany) Florian Wanner	(Switzerland) Sergei Aschwanden	(Estonia) Aleksei Budõlin	(Poland) Robert Krawczyk
(Egypt) 2005	(Netherlands) Guillaume Elmont	(Algeria) Abderrahmane Benamadi	(Japan) Takashi Ono	(Ukraine) Roman Hontyuk
(Brazil) 2007	(Brazil) Tiago Camilo	(France) Anthony Rodriguez	(Netherlands) Guillaume Elmont	(United Kingdom) Euan Burton
(Netherlands) 2009	(Russia) Ivan Nifontov	(Belarus) Siarhei Shundzikau	(Germany) Ole Bischof	(South Korea) Kim Jae-bum
(Japan) 2010	(South Korea) Kim Jae-bum	(Brazil) Leandro Guilheiro	(Japan) Masahiro Takamatsu	(United Kingdom) Euan Burton
(France) 2011	(South Korea) Kim Jae-bum	(Montenegro) Srđan Mrvaljević	(Brazil) Leandro Guilheiro	(Moldova) Sergiu Toma
(Brazil) 2013	(France) Loïc Pietri	(Georgia (country)) Avtandili Tchrikishvili	(Russia) Ivan Vorobev	(France) Alain Schmitt
(Russia) 2014	(Georgia (country)) Avtandili Tchrikishvili	(Canada) Antoine Valois-Fortier	(Russia) Ivan Nifontov	(France) Loïc Pietri
(Kazakhstan) 2015	(Japan) Takanori Nagase	(France) Loïc Pietri	(Canada) Antoine Valois-Fortier	(Brazil) Victor Penalber
(Hungary) 2017	(Germany) Alexander Wieczerzak	(Italy) Matteo Marconcini	(Iran) Saeid Mollaei	(Russia) Khasan Khalmurzaev
(Azerbaijan) 2018	(Iran) Saeid Mollaei	(Japan) Sotaro Fujiwara	(Germany) Alexander Wieczerzak	(Turkey) Vedat Albayrak
(Japan) 2019	(Israel) Sagi Muki	(Belgium) Matthias Casse	(Canada) Antoine Valois-Fortier	(Georgia (country)) Luka Maisuradze
(Hungary) 2021	(Belgium) Matthias Casse	(Georgia (country)) Tato Grigalashvili	(Netherlands) Frank de Wit	(Portugal) Anri Egutidze
(Uzbekistan) 2022	(Georgia (country)) Tato Grigalashvili	(Belgium) Matthias Casse	(Japan) Takanori Nagase	(Austria) Shamil Borchashvili
(Qatar) 2023	(Georgia (country)) Tato Grigalashvili	(Belgium) Matthias Casse	(Japan) Takanori Nagase	(South Korea) Lee Joon-hwan
(United Arab Emirates) 2024	(Georgia (country)) Tato Grigalashvili	Timur Arbuzov	(Tajikistan) Somon Makhmadbekov	(South Korea) Lee Joon-hwan
(Hungary) 2025	Timur Arbuzov	(Georgia (country)) Tato Grigalashvili	(Azerbaijan) Zelim Tckaev	(South Korea) Lee Joon-hwan
(Azerbaijan) 2026	(Georgia (country)) Tato Grigalashvili	(Azerbaijan) Zelim Tckaev	(Azerbaijan) Omar Rajabli	(Serbia) Mihajlo Simin

=== Middleweight ===
- 80 kg (1965–1975)
- 86 kg (1979–1997)
- 90 kg (1999–)

Year	Gold	Silver	Bronze	
(Brazil) 1965	(Japan) Isao Okano	(Japan) Kenichi Yamanaka	(United States) Jim Bregman	(South Korea) Kim Eui-tae
(United States) 1967	(Japan) Eiji Maruki	(Netherlands) Martin Poglajen	(Japan) Shinichi Enshu	(United Kingdom) Brian Jacks
(Mexico) 1969	(Japan) Isamu Sonoda	(Japan) Katsuya Hirao	(Netherlands) Martin Poglajen	(South Korea) Oh Seung-lip
(West Germany) 1971	(Japan) Shōzō Fujii	(Japan) Yoshinari Shigematsu	(France) Guy Auffray	(United Kingdom) David Starbrook
(Switzerland) 1973	(Japan) Shōzō Fujii	(Japan) Isamu Sonoda	(East Germany) Bernd Look	(Poland) Antoni Reiner
(Austria) 1975	(Japan) Shōzō Fujii	(Japan) Yoshimi Hara	(France) Jean-Paul Coche	(Poland) Adam Adamczyk
(France) 1979	(East Germany) Detlef Ultsch	(France) Michel Sanchis	(Japan) Masao Takahashi	(Brazil) Walter Carmona
(Netherlands) 1981	(France) Bernard Tchoullouyan	(Japan) Seiki Nose	(East Germany) Detlef Ultsch	(Soviet Union) David Bodaveli
(Soviet Union) 1983	(East Germany) Detlef Ultsch	(France) Fabien Canu	(United States) Robert Berland	(Japan) Seiki Nose
(South Korea) 1985	(Austria) Peter Seisenbacher	(Bulgaria) Georgi Petrov	(France) Fabien Canu	(Soviet Union) Vitali Pesniak
(West Germany) 1987	(France) Fabien Canu	(North Korea) Pak Jong-chol	(Japan) Masao Murata	(United Kingdom) Densign White
(Socialist Federal Republic of Yugoslavia) 1989	(France) Fabien Canu	(Netherlands) Ben Spijkers	(West Germany) Stefan Freudenberg	(East Germany) Axel Lobenstein
(Spain) 1991	(Japan) Hirotaka Okada	(United States) Joseph Wanag	(Poland) Waldemar Legień	(Italy) Giorgio Vismara
(Canada) 1993	(Japan) Yoshio Nakamura	(Canada) Nicolas Gill	(Romania) Adrian Croitoru	(Spain) León Villar
(Japan) 1995	(South Korea) Jeon Ki-young	(Japan) Hidehiko Yoshida	(Canada) Nicolas Gill	(Russia) Oleg Maltsev
(France) 1997	(South Korea) Jeon Ki-young	(Germany) Marko Spittka	(United States) Brian Olson	(Italy) Michele Monti
(United Kingdom) 1999	(Japan) Hidehiko Yoshida	(Moldova) Victor Florescu	(South Korea) Yoo Sung-yeon	(Romania) Adrian Croitoru
(Germany) 2001	(France) Frédéric Demontfaucon	(Georgia (country)) Zurab Zviadauri	(South Korea) Yoon Dong-sik	(Azerbaijan) Rasul Salimov
(Japan) 2003	(South Korea) Hwang Hee-tae	(Georgia (country)) Zurab Zviadauri	(Belarus) Siarhei Kukharenka	(Brazil) Carlos Honorato
(Egypt) 2005	(Japan) Hiroshi Izumi	(Greece) Ilias Iliadis	(Netherlands) Mark Huizinga	(Belarus) Andrei Kazusenok
(Brazil) 2007	(Georgia (country)) Irakli Tsirekidze	(Greece) Ilias Iliadis	(Italy) Roberto Meloni	(Russia) Ivan Pershin
(Netherlands) 2009	(South Korea) Lee Kyu-won	(Russia) Kirill Denisov	(Egypt) Hesham Mesbah	(Uzbekistan) Dilshod Choriev
(Japan) 2010	(Greece) Ilias Iliadis	(Japan) Daiki Nishiyama	(Russia) Kirill Denisov	(Azerbaijan) Elkhan Mammadov
(France) 2011	(Greece) Ilias Iliadis	(Japan) Daiki Nishiyama	(Japan) Takashi Ono	(Cuba) Asley González
(Brazil) 2013	(Cuba) Asley González	(Georgia (country)) Varlam Liparteliani	(Greece) Ilias Iliadis	(Russia) Kirill Denisov
(Russia) 2014	(Greece) Ilias Iliadis	(Hungary) Krisztián Tóth	(Georgia (country)) Varlam Liparteliani	(Russia) Kirill Voprosov
(Kazakhstan) 2015	(South Korea) Gwak Dong-han	(Russia) Kirill Denisov	(Georgia (country)) Varlam Liparteliani	(Japan) Mashu Baker
(Hungary) 2017	(Serbia) Nemanja Majdov	(Slovenia) Mihael Žgank	(South Korea) Gwak Dong-han	(Georgia (country)) Ushangi Margiani
(Azerbaijan) 2018	(Spain) Nikoloz Sherazadishvili	(Cuba) Iván Felipe Silva Morales	(Japan) Kenta Nagasawa	(France) Axel Clerget
(Japan) 2019	(Netherlands) Noël van 't End	(Japan) Shoichiro Mukai	(Serbia) Nemanja Majdov	(France) Axel Clerget
(Hungary) 2021	(Spain) Nikoloz Sherazadishvili	(Uzbekistan) Davlat Bobonov	(Hungary) Krisztián Tóth	(Sweden) Marcus Nyman
(Uzbekistan) 2022	(Uzbekistan) Davlat Bobonov	(Italy) Christian Parlati	(Georgia (country)) Luka Maisuradze	(Georgia (country)) Lasha Bekauri
(Qatar) 2023	(Georgia (country)) Luka Maisuradze	(Georgia (country)) Lasha Bekauri	(Sweden) Marcus Nyman	(Japan) Sanshiro Murao
(United Arab Emirates) 2024	(Japan) Goki Tajima	(Serbia) Nemanja Majdov	(Kyrgyzstan) Erlan Sherov	(Spain) Tristani Mosakhlishvili
(Hungary) 2025	(Japan) Sanshiro Murao	(Japan) Goki Tajima	(Georgia (country)) Luka Maisuradze	(Azerbaijan) Eljan Hajiyev
(Azerbaijan) 2026	(Japan) Sanshiro Murao	(Japan) Goki Tajima	(Azerbaijan) Murad Fatiyev	(Serbia) Boris Rutović

=== Half Heavyweight ===
- 93 kg (1967–1975)
- 95 kg (1979–1997)
- 100 kg (1999–)

Year	Gold	Silver	Bronze	
(United States) 1967	(Japan) Nobuyuki Sato	(Japan) Osamu Sato	(West Germany) Peter Herrmann	(Netherlands) Ernst Eugster
(Mexico) 1969	(Japan) Fumio Sasahara	(West Germany) Peter Herrmann	(Japan) Tomoyuki Kawabata	(Soviet Union) Vladimir Pokatayev
(West Germany) 1971	(Japan) Fumio Sasahara	(Japan) Nobuyuki Sato	(East Germany) Helmut Howiller	(Brazil) Chiaki Ishii
(Switzerland) 1973	(Japan) Nobuyuki Sato	(Japan) Takafumi Ueguchi	(East Germany) Dietmar Lorenz	(United Kingdom) David Starbrook
(Austria) 1975	(France) Jean-Luc Rougé	(Japan) Michinori Ishibashi	(Soviet Union) Viktor Betanov	(Soviet Union) Ramaz Kharshiladze
(France) 1979	(Soviet Union) Tengiz Khubuluri	(Belgium) Robert Van de Walle	(West Germany) Günther Neureuther	(Netherlands) Henk Numan
(Netherlands) 1981	(Soviet Union) Tengiz Khubuluri	(Belgium) Robert Van de Walle	(South Korea) Ha Hyung-joo	(France) Roger Vachon
(Soviet Union) 1983	(East Germany) Andreas Preschel	(Soviet Union) Valeri Divisenko	(West Germany) Günther Neureuther	(Belgium) Robert Van de Walle
(South Korea) 1985	(Japan) Hitoshi Sugai	(South Korea) Ha Hyung-joo	(West Germany) Günther Neureuther	(Belgium) Robert Van de Walle
(West Germany) 1987	(Japan) Hitoshi Sugai	(Netherlands) Theo Meijer	(South Korea) Ha Hyung-joo	(Brazil) Aurélio Miguel
(Socialist Federal Republic of Yugoslavia) 1989	(Soviet Union) Koba Kurtanidze	(Mongolia) Odvogiin Baljinnyam	(West Germany) Marc Meiling	(Belgium) Robert Van de Walle
(Spain) 1991	(France) Stéphane Traineau	(Poland) Paweł Nastula	(Germany) Marc Meiling	(Czechoslovakia) Jiří Sosna
(Canada) 1993	(Hungary) Antal Kovács	(Brazil) Aurélio Miguel	(Germany) Marc Meiling	(France) Stéphane Traineau
(Japan) 1995	(Poland) Paweł Nastula	(Russia) Dmitri Sergeyev	(Japan) Shigeru Okaizumi	(France) Stéphane Traineau
(France) 1997	(Poland) Paweł Nastula	(Brazil) Aurélio Miguel	(Japan) Yoshio Nakamura	(France) Ghislain Lemaire
(United Kingdom) 1999	(Japan) Kōsei Inoue	(South Korea) Jang Sung-ho	(Russia) Alexander Mikhaylin	(Canada) Nicolas Gill
(Germany) 2001	(Japan) Kōsei Inoue	(Hungary) Antal Kovács	(South Korea) Jang Sung-ho	(Kazakhstan) Askhat Zhitkeyev
(Japan) 2003	(Japan) Kōsei Inoue	(France) Ghislain Lemaire	(Belarus) Ihar Makarau	(Brazil) Mário Sabino
(Egypt) 2005	(Japan) Keiji Suzuki	(Ukraine) Vitaliy Bubon	(Russia) Dmitri Kabanov	(Brazil) Luciano Corrêa
(Brazil) 2007	(Brazil) Luciano Corrêa	(United Kingdom) Peter Cousins	(Hungary) Dániel Hadfi	(Cuba) Oreidis Despaigne
(Netherlands) 2009	(Kazakhstan) Maxim Rakov	(Netherlands) Henk Grol	(Egypt) Ramadan Darwish	(Japan) Takamasa Anai
(Japan) 2010	(Japan) Takamasa Anai	(Netherlands) Henk Grol	(Cuba) Oreidis Despaigne	(France) Thierry Fabre
(France) 2011	(Russia) Tagir Khaybulaev	(Kazakhstan) Maxim Rakov	(Georgia (country)) Irakli Tsirekidze	(Czech Republic) Lukáš Krpálek
(Brazil) 2013	(Azerbaijan) Elkhan Mammadov	(Netherlands) Henk Grol	(Germany) Dimitri Peters	(Czech Republic) Lukáš Krpálek
(Russia) 2014	(Czech Republic) Lukáš Krpálek	(Cuba) José Armenteros	(United Arab Emirates) Ivan Remarenco	(Germany) Karl-Richard Frey
(Kazakhstan) 2015	(Japan) Ryunosuke Haga	(Germany) Karl-Richard Frey	(Belgium) Toma Nikiforov	(Germany) Dimitri Peters
(Hungary) 2017	(Japan) Aaron Wolf	(Georgia (country)) Varlam Liparteliani	(Azerbaijan) Elmar Gasimov	(Russia) Kirill Denisov
(Azerbaijan) 2018	(South Korea) Cho Gu-ham	(Georgia (country)) Varlam Liparteliani	(Mongolia) Lkhagvasürengiin Otgonbaatar	(Russia) Niyaz Ilyasov
(Japan) 2019	(Portugal) Jorge Fonseca	(Russia) Niyaz Ilyasov	(Netherlands) Michael Korrel	(Japan) Aaron Wolf
(Hungary) 2021	(Portugal) Jorge Fonseca	(Serbia) Aleksandar Kukolj	(Georgia (country)) Varlam Liparteliani	(Georgia (country)) Ilia Sulamanidze
(Uzbekistan) 2022	(Uzbekistan) Muzaffarbek Turoboyev	(Canada) Kyle Reyes	(Netherlands) Michael Korrel	(Azerbaijan) Zelym Kotsoiev
(Qatar) 2023	Arman Adamian (Note: At the 2023 World Championships, in accordance with sanctions imposed following by the 2022 Russian invasion of Ukraine, judokas from Russia were not permitted to use the name, flag, or anthem of Russia. They instead participated as "Individual Neutral Athletes (AIN)", their medals were not included in the official medal table.)	(Czech Republic) Lukáš Krpálek	(Israel) Peter Paltchik	(Azerbaijan) Zelym Kotsoiev
(United Arab Emirates) 2024	(Azerbaijan) Zelym Kotsoiev	(Canada) Shady Elnahas	(Japan) Dota Arai	(Spain) Nikoloz Sherazadishvili
(Hungary) 2025	Matvey Kanikovskiy	(Japan) Dota Arai	Arman Adamian	(Azerbaijan) Zelym Kotsoiev
(Azerbaijan) 2026	(Georgia (country)) Ilia Sulamanidze	(Japan) Dota Arai	(Russia) Niyaz Bilalov	(Italy) Gennaro Pirelli

=== Heavyweight ===
- 80+ kg (1965)
- 93+ kg (1967–1975)
- 95+ kg (1979–1997)
- 100+ kg (1999–)

Year	Gold	Silver	Bronze	
(Brazil) 1965	(Netherlands) Anton Geesink	(Japan) Mitsuo Matsunaga	(Japan) Seiji Sakaguchi	(Canada) Doug Rogers
(United States) 1967	(Netherlands) Wim Ruska	(Japan) Nobuyuki Maejima	(Japan) Takeshi Matsuzaka	(Soviet Union) Anzor Kiknadze
(Mexico) 1969	(Japan) Shuji Suma	(West Germany) Klaus Glahn	(Japan) Mitsuo Matsunaga	(Soviet Union) Givi Onashvili
(West Germany) 1971	(Netherlands) Wim Ruska	(West Germany) Klaus Glahn	(Japan) Hisakazu Iwata	(United Kingdom) Keith Remfry
(Switzerland) 1973	(Japan) Chonosuke Takagi	(Soviet Union) Jibilo Nizharadze	(Soviet Union) Sergei Novikov	(United Kingdom) Keith Remfry
(Austria) 1975	(Japan) Sumio Endo	(Soviet Union) Sergei Novikov	(Japan) Chonosuke Takagi	(North Korea) Pak Gil-jong
(France) 1979	(Japan) Yasuhiro Yamashita	(France) Jean-Luc Rougé	(South Korea) Cho Jae-ki	(Hungary) Imre Varga
(Netherlands) 1981	(Japan) Yasuhiro Yamashita	(Soviet Union) Grigory Verichev	(Czechoslovakia) Vladimír Kocman	(Finland) Juha Salonen
(Soviet Union) 1983	(Japan) Yasuhiro Yamashita	(Netherlands) Willy Wilhelm	(Romania) Mihai Cioc	(East Germany) Henry Stöhr
(South Korea) 1985	(South Korea) Cho Yong-chul	(Japan) Hitoshi Saito	(Soviet Union) Grigory Verichev	(Bulgaria) Dimitar Zapryanov
(West Germany) 1987	(Soviet Union) Grigory Verichev	(Egypt) Mohamed Ali Rashwan	(West Germany) Jochen Plate	(China) Xu Guoqing
(Socialist Federal Republic of Yugoslavia) 1989	(Japan) Naoya Ogawa	(Cuba) Frank Moreno	(Soviet Union) Grigory Verichev	(Poland) Rafał Kubacki
(Spain) 1991	(Soviet Union) Sergei Kosorotov	(Cuba) Frank Moreno	(Japan) Naoya Ogawa	(South Korea) Kim Geon-su
(Canada) 1993	(France) David Douillet	(Georgia (country)) David Khakhaleishvili	(Russia) Sergei Kosorotov	(Germany) Frank Möller
(Japan) 1995	(France) David Douillet	(Germany) Frank Möller	(Georgia (country)) David Khakhaleishvili	(Japan) Naoya Ogawa
(France) 1997	(France) David Douillet	(Japan) Shinichi Shinohara	(Russia) Tamerlan Tmenov	(China) Pan Song
(United Kingdom) 1999	(Japan) Shinichi Shinohara	(Estonia) Indrek Pertelson	(Turkey) Selim Tataroğlu	(China) Pan Song
(Germany) 2001	(Russia) Alexander Mikhaylin	(Turkey) Selim Tataroğlu	(Japan) Shinichi Shinohara	(Iran) Mahmoud Miran
(Japan) 2003	(Japan) Yasuyuki Muneta	(Netherlands) Dennis van der Geest	(Russia) Tamerlan Tmenov	(Ukraine) Yevgen Sotnikov
(Egypt) 2005	(Russia) Alexander Mikhaylin	(Japan) Yasuyuki Muneta	(France) Pierre Robin	(Georgia (country)) Lasha Gujejiani
(Brazil) 2007	(France) Teddy Riner	(Russia) Tamerlan Tmenov	(Brazil) João Schlittler	(Georgia (country)) Lasha Gujejiani
(Netherlands) 2009	(France) Teddy Riner	(Cuba) Óscar Brayson	(Uzbekistan) Abdullo Tangriev	(Lithuania) Marius Paškevičius
(Japan) 2010	(France) Teddy Riner	(Germany) Andreas Tölzer	(France) Matthieu Bataille	(Egypt) Islam El Shehaby
(France) 2011	(France) Teddy Riner	(Germany) Andreas Tölzer	(Russia) Alexander Mikhaylin	(South Korea) Kim Sung-min
(Brazil) 2013	(France) Teddy Riner	(Brazil) Rafael Silva	(Germany) Andreas Tölzer	(Tunisia) Faïcel Jaballah
(Russia) 2014	(France) Teddy Riner	(Japan) Ryu Shichinohe	(Brazil) Rafael Silva	(Russia) Renat Saidov
(Kazakhstan) 2015	(France) Teddy Riner	(Japan) Ryu Shichinohe	(Georgia (country)) Adam Okruashvili	(Ukraine) Iakiv Khammo
(Hungary) 2017	(France) Teddy Riner	(Brazil) David Moura	(Brazil) Rafael Silva	(Mongolia) Naidangiin Tüvshinbayar
(Azerbaijan) 2018	(Georgia (country)) Guram Tushishvili	(Azerbaijan) Ushangi Kokauri	(Japan) Hisayoshi Harasawa	(Mongolia) Ölziibayaryn Düürenbayar
(Japan) 2019	(Czech Republic) Lukáš Krpálek	(Japan) Hisayoshi Harasawa	(South Korea) Kim Min-jong	(Netherlands) Roy Meyer
(Hungary) 2021	(Japan) Kokoro Kageura	(Russia) Tamerlan Bashaev	(Ukraine) Iakiv Khammo	(Netherlands) Roy Meyer
(Uzbekistan) 2022	(Cuba) Andy Granda	(Japan) Tatsuru Saito	(Georgia (country)) Guram Tushishvili	(South Korea) Kim Min-jong
(Qatar) 2023 (Note: During the final between Teddy Riner and Inal Tasoev, there was one situation where neither the referee on the mat nor the IJF Refereeing Commission gave any score. Following a thorough expert analysis, according to the current refereeing rules, a score could have been awarded for Inal Tasoev's counterattack. Therefore, the IJF declares both athletes as the winners of the contest and award a gold medal and the corresponding ranking points to Inal Tasoev.)	(France) Teddy Riner; Inal Tasoev	Not awarded	(Brazil) Rafael Silva	(Uzbekistan) Alisher Yusupov
(United Arab Emirates) 2024	(South Korea) Kim Min-jong	(Georgia (country)) Guram Tushishvili	Tamerlan Bashaev	(Uzbekistan) Alisher Yusupov
(Hungary) 2025	Inal Tasoev	(Georgia (country)) Guram Tushishvili	(Tajikistan) Temur Rakhimov	(South Korea) Kim Min-jong
(Azerbaijan) 2026	(Russia) Inal Tasoev	(Azerbaijan) Ushangi Kokauri	(Czech Republic) Lukáš Krpálek	(Azerbaijan) Kanan Nasibov

=== Openweight ===
Year	Gold	Silver	Bronze	
(Japan) 1956	(Japan) Shokichi Natsui	(Japan) Yoshihiko Yoshimatsu	(Netherlands) Anton Geesink	(France) Henri Courtine
(Japan) 1958	(Japan) Koji Sone	(Japan) Akio Kaminaga	(Japan) Kimiyoshi Yamashiki	(France) Bernard Pariset
(France) 1961	(Netherlands) Anton Geesink	(Japan) Koji Sone	(Japan) Takeshi Koga	(South Korea) Kim Eui-tae
(Brazil) 1965	(Japan) Isao Inokuma	(Soviet Union) Anzor Kibrotsashvili	(Netherlands) Peter Snijders	(Soviet Union) Anzor Kiknadze
(United States) 1967	(Japan) Mitsuo Matsunaga	(West Germany) Klaus Glahn	(West Germany) Peter Herrmann	(Japan) Masatoshi Shinomaki
(Mexico) 1969	(Japan) Masatoshi Shinomaki	(Netherlands) Wim Ruska	(Netherlands) Ernst Eugster	(Japan) Nobuyuki Sato
(West Germany) 1971	(Japan) Masatoshi Shinomaki	(Soviet Union) Vitali Kuznetsov	(West Germany) Klaus Glahn	(Japan) Shinobu Sekine
(Switzerland) 1973	(Japan) Kazuhiro Ninomiya	(Japan) Haruki Uemura	(West Germany) Klaus Glahn	(East Germany) Wolfgang Zuckschwerdt
(Austria) 1975	(Japan) Haruki Uemura	(Japan) Kazuhiro Ninomiya	(Soviet Union) Shota Chochishvili	(East Germany) Dietmar Lorenz
(France) 1979	(Japan) Sumio Endo	(Soviet Union) Vitali Kuznetsov	(Socialist Federal Republic of Yugoslavia) Radomir Kovačević	(France) Jean-Luc Rougé
(Netherlands) 1981	(Japan) Yasuhiro Yamashita	(Poland) Wojciech Reszko	(Hungary) András Ozsvár	(Belgium) Robert Van de Walle
(Soviet Union) 1983	(Japan) Hitoshi Saito	(Czechoslovakia) Vladimír Kocman	(Hungary) András Ozsvár	(Belgium) Robert Van de Walle
(South Korea) 1985	(Japan) Yoshimi Masaki	(Egypt) Mohamed Ali Rashwan	(Soviet Union) Khabil Biktachev	(Netherlands) Willy Wilhelm
(West Germany) 1987	(Japan) Naoya Ogawa	(United Kingdom) Elvis Gordon	(Cuba) Jorge Fis Castro	(East Germany) Henry Stöhr
(Socialist Federal Republic of Yugoslavia) 1989	(Japan) Naoya Ogawa	(Soviet Union) Akaki Kibodzalidze	(South Korea) Kim Kun-Soo	(West Germany) Alexander von der Groeben
(Spain) 1991	(Japan) Naoya Ogawa	(Soviet Union) David Khakhaleishvili	(Hungary) Imre Csősz	(France) Georges Mathonnet
(Canada) 1993	(Poland) Rafał Kubacki	(Germany) Henry Stöhr	(Georgia (country)) David Khakhaleishvili	(Japan) Naoya Ogawa
(Japan) 1995	(France) David Douillet	(Russia) Sergei Kosorotov	(Turkey) Selim Tataroğlu	(Japan) Shinichi Shinohara
(France) 1997	(Poland) Rafał Kubacki	(Japan) Yoshiharu Makishi	(Netherlands) Dennis van der Geest	(Belgium) Harry Van Barneveld
(United Kingdom) 1999	(Japan) Shinichi Shinohara	(Turkey) Selim Tataroğlu	(Netherlands) Dennis van der Geest	(Belgium) Harry Van Barneveld
(Germany) 2001	(Russia) Alexander Mikhaylin	(Israel) Ariel Ze'evi	(Netherlands) Dennis van der Geest	(Germany) Frank Möller
(Japan) 2003	(Japan) Keiji Suzuki	(Estonia) Indrek Pertelson	(Uzbekistan) Abdullo Tangriev	(Azerbaijan) Movlud Miraliyev
(Egypt) 2005	(Netherlands) Dennis van der Geest	(Russia) Tamerlan Tmenov	(Japan) Yohei Takai	(Belarus) Yury Rybak
(Brazil) 2007	(Japan) Yasuyuki Muneta	(Belarus) Yury Rybak	(France) Matthieu Bataille	(Uzbekistan) Abdullo Tangriev
(France) 2008	(France) Teddy Riner	(Russia) Alexander Mikhaylin	(France) Matthieu Bataille	(Poland) Grzegorz Eitel
(Japan) 2010	(Japan) Daiki Kamikawa	(France) Teddy Riner	(Japan) Hiroki Tachiyama	(Japan) Keiji Suzuki
(Russia) 2011	(Uzbekistan) Abdullo Tangriev	(Hungary) Barna Bor	(Russia) Alexander Mikhaylin	(Japan) Keiji Suzuki
(Morocco) 2017	(France) Teddy Riner	(Belgium) Toma Nikiforov	(Cuba) Alex García Mendoza	(Japan) Takeshi Ōjitani

=== Team ===
Year	Gold	Silver	Bronze	
(France) 1994	France	Germany	Japan	Russia
(Belarus) 1998	Japan	Brazil	France	Russia
(Switzerland) 2002	Japan	Georgia	France	Italy
(France) 2006	Georgia	Russia	France	South Korea
(China) 2007	Japan	Brazil	China	South Korea
(Japan) 2008	Georgia	Uzbekistan	Brazil	Russia
(Turkey) 2010	Japan	Brazil	South Korea	Russia
(France) 2011	France	Brazil	South Korea	Japan
(Brazil) 2012	Russia	Japan	Brazil	Georgia
(Brazil) 2013	Georgia	Russia	Germany	Japan
(Russia) 2014	Japan	Russia	Germany	Georgia
(Kazakhstan) 2015	Japan	South Korea	Mongolia	Georgia

== Women ==
=== Extra Lightweight ===
- 48 kg

Year	Gold	Silver	Bronze	
(United States) 1980	(United Kingdom) Jane Bridge	(Italy) Anna de Novellis	Marie-France Colignon	(United States) Marie Lewis
(France) 1982	(United Kingdom) Karen Briggs	Marie-France Colignon	(Netherlands) Jola Bink	(Japan) Hitomi Nakahara
(Austria) 1984	(United Kingdom) Karen Briggs	Marie-France Colignon	(United States) Darlene Anaya	(Australia) Julie Reardon
(Netherlands) 1986	(United Kingdom) Karen Briggs	(Japan) Fumiko Ezaki	(France) Fabienne Boffin	(China) Li Zhongyun
(West Germany) 1987	(China) Li Zhongyun	(Japan) Fumiko Ezaki	(Netherlands) Jessica Gal	(Chinese Taipei) Chou Yu-ping
(Socialist Federal Republic of Yugoslavia) 1989	(United Kingdom) Karen Briggs	(Japan) Fumiko Ezaki	(Netherlands) Jessica Gal	(France) Cécile Nowak
(Spain) 1991	(France) Cécile Nowak	(United Kingdom) Karen Briggs	(Japan) Ryoko Tamura	(Cuba) Legna Verdecia
(Canada) 1993	(Japan) Ryoko Tamura	(China) Li Aiyue	(United Kingdom) Joyce Heron	(Italy) Giovanna Tortora
(Japan) 1995	(Japan) Ryoko Tamura	(China) Li Aiyue	(Cuba) Amarilis Savón	(Poland) Małgorzata Roszkowska
(France) 1997	(Japan) Ryoko Tamura	(Cuba) Amarilis Savón	(Switzerland) Monika Kurath	(North Korea) Pae Dong-suk
(United Kingdom) 1999	(Japan) Ryoko Tamura	(Cuba) Amarilis Savón	(France) Sarah Nichilo-Rosso	(Germany) Anna-Maria Gradante
(Germany) 2001	(Japan) Ryoko Tamura	(North Korea) Ri Kyong-ok	(Cuba) Danieska Carrión	(Italy) Giuseppina Macrì
(Japan) 2003	(Japan) Ryoko Tamura	(France) Frédérique Jossinet	(Cuba) Danieska Carrión	(Turkey) Neşe Şensoy
(Egypt) 2005	(Cuba) Yanet Bermoy	(France) Frédérique Jossinet	(Romania) Alina Dumitru	(Algeria) Soraya Haddad
(Brazil) 2007	(Japan) Ryoko Tani	(Cuba) Yanet Bermoy	(Romania) Alina Dumitru	(France) Frédérique Jossinet
(Netherlands) 2009	(Japan) Tomoko Fukumi	(Spain) Oiana Blanco	(South Korea) Chung Jung-yeon	(France) Frédérique Jossinet
(Japan) 2010	(Japan) Haruna Asami	(Japan) Tomoko Fukumi	(Romania) Alina Dumitru	(Brazil) Sarah Menezes
(France) 2011	(Japan) Haruna Asami	(Japan) Tomoko Fukumi	(Hungary) Éva Csernoviczki	(Brazil) Sarah Menezes
(Brazil) 2013	(Mongolia) Mönkhbatyn Urantsetseg	(Japan) Haruna Asami	(Belgium) Charline Van Snick	(Brazil) Sarah Menezes
(Russia) 2014	(Japan) Ami Kondo	(Argentina) Paula Pareto	(France) Amandine Buchard	(Cuba) Maria Celia Laborde
(Kazakhstan) 2015	(Argentina) Paula Pareto	(Japan) Haruna Asami	(Japan) Ami Kondo	(South Korea) Jeong Bo-kyeong
(Hungary) 2017	(Japan) Funa Tonaki	(Mongolia) Mönkhbatyn Urantsetseg	(Japan) Ami Kondo	(Kazakhstan) Otgontsetseg Galbadrakh
(Azerbaijan) 2018	(Ukraine) Daria Bilodid	(Japan) Funa Tonaki	(Argentina) Paula Pareto	(Kazakhstan) Otgontsetseg Galbadrakh
(Japan) 2019	(Ukraine) Daria Bilodid	(Japan) Funa Tonaki	(Kosovo) Distria Krasniqi	(Mongolia) Mönkhbatyn Urantsetseg
(Hungary) 2021	(Japan) Natsumi Tsunoda	(Japan) Wakana Koga	(Spain) Julia Figueroa	(Mongolia) Mönkhbatyn Urantsetseg
(Uzbekistan) 2022	(Japan) Natsumi Tsunoda	(Germany) Katharina Menz	(Italy) Assunta Scutto	(Kazakhstan) Abiba Abuzhakynova
(Qatar) 2023	(Japan) Natsumi Tsunoda	(France) Shirine Boukli	(Italy) Assunta Scutto	(Japan) Wakana Koga
(United Arab Emirates) 2024	(Mongolia) Bavuudorjiin Baasankhüü	(Italy) Assunta Scutto	(Sweden) Tara Babulfath	(Kazakhstan) Abiba Abuzhakynova
(Hungary) 2025	(Italy) Assunta Scutto	(Kazakhstan) Abiba Abuzhakynova	(Japan) Wakana Koga	(Spain) Laura Martínez
(Azerbaijan) 2026	(Japan) Wakana Koga	(Italy) Assunta Scutto	(France) Shirine Boukli	(Russia) Sabina Giliazova

=== Half Lightweight ===
- 52 kg

Year	Gold	Silver	Bronze	
(United States) 1980	(Austria) Edith Hrovat	(Japan) Kaori Yamaguchi	(France) Pascale Doger	(United Kingdom) Bridge MacCarth
(France) 1982	(United Kingdom) Loretta Doyle	(Japan) Kaori Yamaguchi	(Australia) Christina-Ann Boyd	(France) Pascale Doger
(Austria) 1984	(Japan) Kaori Yamaguchi	(Austria) Edith Hrovat	(Australia) Christina-Ann Boyd	(Poland) Joanna Majdan
(Netherlands) 1986	(France) Dominique Brun	(Japan) Kaori Yamaguchi	(South Korea) Ock Kyoung-sook	(United Kingdom) Sharon Rendle
(West Germany) 1987	(United Kingdom) Sharon Rendle	(Japan) Kaori Yamaguchi	(France) Dominique Brun	(Italy) Alessandra Giungi
(Socialist Federal Republic of Yugoslavia) 1989	(United Kingdom) Sharon Rendle	(Italy) Alessandra Giungi	(Cuba) Maritza Pérez Cárdenas	(South Korea) Cho Min-sun
(Spain) 1991	(Italy) Alessandra Giungi	(United Kingdom) Sharon Rendle	(Cuba) Maritza Pérez Cárdenas	(Japan) Mutsumi Ueda
(Canada) 1993	(Cuba) Legna Verdecia	(Spain) Almudena Muñoz	(France) Cécile Nowak	(Japan) Wakaba Suzuki
(Japan) 1995	(France) Marie-Claire Restoux	(Argentina) Carolina Mariani	(United Kingdom) Sharon Rendle	(Cuba) Legna Verdecia
(France) 1997	(France) Marie-Claire Restoux	(North Korea) Kye Sun-hui	(South Korea) Hyun Sook-hee	(Belgium) Nicole Flagothier
(United Kingdom) 1999	(Japan) Noriko Narazaki	(Cuba) Legna Verdecia	(North Korea) Kye Sun-hui	(France) Marie-Claire Restoux
(Germany) 2001	(North Korea) Kye Sun-hui	(Germany) Raffaella Imbriani	(Cuba) Legna Verdecia	(China) Liu Yuxiang
(Japan) 2003	(Cuba) Amarilis Savón	(France) Annabelle Euranie	(Germany) Raffaella Imbriani	(Japan) Yuki Yokosawa
(Egypt) 2005	(China) Li Ying	(Japan) Yuki Yokosawa	(North Korea) An Kum-ae	(Portugal) Telma Monteiro
(Brazil) 2007	(China) Shi Junjie	(Portugal) Telma Monteiro	(North Korea) An Kum-ae	(Japan) Yuka Nishida
(Netherlands) 2009	(Japan) Misato Nakamura	(Cuba) Yanet Bermoy	(Spain) Ana Carrascosa	(Germany) Romy Tarangul
(Japan) 2010	(Japan) Yuka Nishida	(Japan) Misato Nakamura	(Russia) Natalia Kuziutina	(Mongolia) Mönkhbaataryn Bundmaa
(France) 2011	(Japan) Misato Nakamura	(Japan) Yuka Nishida	(Spain) Ana Carrascosa	(Romania) Andreea Chițu
(Brazil) 2013	(Kosovo) Majlinda Kelmendi	(Brazil) Érika Miranda	(Japan) Yuki Hashimoto	(Germany) Mareen Kräh
(Russia) 2014	Majlinda Kelmendi (Note: Unlike 2013, Kelmendi did not compete under the Kosovo flag but under the International Judo Federation flag.)	(Romania) Andreea Chițu	(Brazil) Érika Miranda	(Russia) Natalia Kuziutina
(Kazakhstan) 2015	(Japan) Misato Nakamura	(Romania) Andreea Chițu	(Brazil) Érika Miranda	(Belarus) Darya Skrypnik
(Hungary) 2017	(Japan) Ai Shishime	(Japan) Natsumi Tsunoda	(Brazil) Érika Miranda	(Russia) Natalia Kuziutina
(Azerbaijan) 2018	(Japan) Uta Abe	(Japan) Ai Shishime	(Brazil) Érika Miranda	(France) Amandine Buchard
(Japan) 2019	(Japan) Uta Abe	(Russia) Natalia Kuziutina	(Japan) Ai Shishime	(Kosovo) Majlinda Kelmendi
(Hungary) 2021	(Japan) Ai Shishime	(Spain) Ana Pérez Box	(Switzerland) Fabienne Kocher	(Israel) Gefen Primo
(Uzbekistan) 2022	(Japan) Uta Abe	(United Kingdom) Chelsie Giles	(France) Amandine Buchard	(Kosovo) Distria Krasniqi
(Qatar) 2023	(Japan) Uta Abe	(Uzbekistan) Diyora Keldiyorova	(France) Amandine Buchard	(Italy) Odette Giuffrida
(United Arab Emirates) 2024	(Italy) Odette Giuffrida	(Uzbekistan) Diyora Keldiyorova	(France) Amandine Buchard	(Germany) Mascha Ballhaus
(Hungary) 2025	(Japan) Uta Abe	(Kosovo) Distria Krasniqi	(Hungary) Róza Gyertyás	(Germany) Mascha Ballhaus
(Azerbaijan) 2026	(Japan) Uta Abe	(Spain) Ariane Toro	(Spain) Ayumi Leiva Sánchez	(Italy) Odette Giuffrida

=== Lightweight ===
- 56 kg (1980–1997)
- 57 kg (1999–)

Year	Gold	Silver	Bronze	
(United States) 1980	(Austria) Gerda Winklbauer	(France) Marie-Paule Panza	(United Kingdom) Loretta Doyle	(Belgium) Jeannine Meulemans
(France) 1982	(France) Béatrice Rodriguez	(Australia) Suzanne Williams	(United States) Eve Aronoff	(United Kingdom) Diane Bell
(Austria) 1984	(United States) AnnMaria Burns	(Australia) Suzanne Williams	(France) Catherine Arnaud	(Austria) Gerda Winklbauer
(Netherlands) 1986	(United Kingdom) Ann Hughes	(Poland) Maria Gontowicz	(Netherlands) Chita Gross	(France) Béatrice Rodriguez
(West Germany) 1987	(France) Catherine Arnaud	(Australia) Suzanne Williams	(United Kingdom) Ann Hughes	(West Germany) Regina Philips
(Socialist Federal Republic of Yugoslavia) 1989	(France) Catherine Arnaud	(United Kingdom) Ann Hughes	(Spain) Miriam Blasco	(South Korea) Jung Sun-yong
(Spain) 1991	(Spain) Miriam Blasco	(Belgium) Nicole Flagothier	(United Kingdom) Nicola Fairbrother	(China) Li Zhongyun
(Canada) 1993	(United Kingdom) Nicola Fairbrother	(Japan) Chiyori Tateno	(Netherlands) Jessica Gal	(Cuba) Driulis González
(Japan) 1995	(Cuba) Driulis González	(South Korea) Jung Sun-yong	(Brazil) Danielle Zangrando	(Portugal) Filipa Cavalleri
(France) 1997	(Spain) Isabel Fernández	(Cuba) Driulis González	(Japan) Chiyori Tateno	(France) Magali Baton
(United Kingdom) 1999	(Cuba) Driulis González	(Spain) Isabel Fernández	(Netherlands) Jessica Gal	(Czech Republic) Michaela Vernerová
(Germany) 2001	(Cuba) Yurisleidy Lupetey	(Netherlands) Deborah Gravenstijn	(Spain) Isabel Fernández	(Japan) Kie Kusakabe
(Japan) 2003	(North Korea) Kye Sun-hui	(Germany) Yvonne Bönisch	(Netherlands) Deborah Gravenstijn	(Cuba) Yurisleidy Lupetey
(Egypt) 2005	(North Korea) Kye Sun-hui	(Germany) Yvonne Bönisch	(Austria) Sabrina Filzmoser	(Mongolia) Khishigbatyn Erdenet-Od
(Brazil) 2007	(North Korea) Kye Sun-hui	(Spain) Isabel Fernández	(Japan) Aiko Sato	(Hungary) Bernadett Baczkó
(Netherlands) 2009	(France) Morgane Ribout	(Portugal) Telma Monteiro	(Azerbaijan) Kifayat Gasimova	(Hungary) Hedvig Karakas
(Japan) 2010	(Japan) Kaori Matsumoto	(Portugal) Telma Monteiro	(Austria) Sabrina Filzmoser	(Greece) Ioulietta Boukouvala
(France) 2011	(Japan) Aiko Sato	(Brazil) Rafaela Silva	(Romania) Corina Căprioriu	(Japan) Kaori Matsumoto
(Brazil) 2013	(Brazil) Rafaela Silva	(United States) Marti Malloy	(Slovenia) Vlora Beđeti	(Germany) Miryam Roper
(Russia) 2014	(Japan) Nae Udaka	(Portugal) Telma Monteiro	(Netherlands) Sanne Verhagen	(France) Automne Pavia
(Kazakhstan) 2015	(Japan) Kaori Matsumoto	(Romania) Corina Căprioriu	(Mongolia) Dorjsürengiin Sumiyaa	(France) Automne Pavia
(Hungary) 2017	(Mongolia) Dorjsürengiin Sumiyaa	(Japan) Tsukasa Yoshida	(United Kingdom) Nekoda Smythe-Davis	(France) Hélène Receveaux
(Azerbaijan) 2018	(Japan) Tsukasa Yoshida	(United Kingdom) Nekoda Smythe-Davis	(Canada) Christa Deguchi	(Mongolia) Dorjsürengiin Sumiyaa
(Japan) 2019	(Canada) Christa Deguchi	(Japan) Tsukasa Yoshida	(Poland) Julia Kowalczyk	(Brazil) Rafaela Silva
(Hungary) 2021	(Canada) Jessica Klimkait	(Japan) Momo Tamaoki	(Kosovo) Nora Gjakova	(Germany) Theresa Stoll
(Uzbekistan) 2022	(Brazil) Rafaela Silva	(Japan) Haruka Funakubo	(Canada) Jessica Klimkait	(Mongolia) Lkhagvatogoogiin Enkhriilen
(Qatar) 2023	(Canada) Christa Deguchi	(Japan) Haruka Funakubo	(Canada) Jessica Klimkait	(Mongolia) Lkhagvatogoogiin Enkhriilen
(United Arab Emirates) 2024	(South Korea) Huh Mi-mi	(Canada) Christa Deguchi	(Canada) Jessica Klimkait	(Japan) Momo Tamaoki
(Hungary) 2025	(Georgia (country)) Eteri Liparteliani	(Japan) Momo Tamaoki	(Brazil) Shirlen Nascimento	(France) Sarah-Léonie Cysique
(Azerbaijan) 2026	(Japan) Akari Omori	(Georgia (country)) Eteri Liparteliani	(Croatia) Ana Viktorija Puljiz	(Serbia) Marica Perišić

=== Half Middleweight ===
- 61 kg (1980–1997)
- 63 kg (1999–)

Year	Gold	Silver	Bronze	
(United States) 1980	(Netherlands) Anita Staps	(Italy) Laura Di Toma	(West Germany) Inge Berg	(France) Martine Rottier
(France) 1982	(France) Martine Rottier	(Norway) Inger Lise Solheim	(Belgium) Jeannine Peeters	(West Germany) Gabriele Ritschel
(Austria) 1984	(Venezuela) Natasha Hernández	(Netherlands) Chantal Han	(Japan) Kaori Hachinohe	(France) Martine Rottier
(Netherlands) 1986	(United Kingdom) Diane Bell	(France) Céline Géraud	(Japan) Ryoko Fujimoto	(New Zealand) Donna Guy
(West Germany) 1987	(United Kingdom) Diane Bell	(United States) Lynn Roethke	(Japan) Noriko Mochida	(Poland) Bogusława Olechnowicz
(Socialist Federal Republic of Yugoslavia) 1989	(France) Catherine Fleury-Vachon	(Soviet Union) Yelena Petrova	(Japan) Takako Kobayashi	(West Germany) Gabriele Ritschel
(Spain) 1991	(Germany) Frauke Eickhoff	(United Kingdom) Diane Bell	(Israel) Yael Arad	(France) Catherine Fleury-Vachon
(Canada) 1993	(Belgium) Gella Vandecaveye	(Israel) Yael Arad	(United Kingdom) Diane Bell	(Cuba) Ileana Beltrán
(Japan) 1995	(South Korea) Jung Sung-sook	(Netherlands) Jenny Gal	(Belgium) Gella Vandecaveye	(France) Catherine Fleury-Vachon
(France) 1997	(France) Séverine Vandenhende	(Belgium) Gella Vandecaveye	(Spain) Sara Álvarez	(South Korea) Jung Sung-sook
(United Kingdom) 1999	(Japan) Keiko Maeda	(Belgium) Gella Vandecaveye	(Spain) Sara Álvarez	(United Kingdom) Karen Roberts
(Germany) 2001	(Belgium) Gella Vandecaveye	(Spain) Sara Álvarez	(Cuba) Anaysi Hernández	(Japan) Ayumi Tanimoto
(Japan) 2003	(Argentina) Daniela Krukower	(Cuba) Driulis González	(Germany) Anna von Harnier	(Italy) Ylenia Scapin
(Egypt) 2005	(France) Lucie Décosse	(Japan) Ayumi Tanimoto	(Cuba) Driulis González	(Slovenia) Urška Žolnir
(Brazil) 2007	(Cuba) Driulis González	(France) Lucie Décosse	(Japan) Ayumi Tanimoto	(Netherlands) Elisabeth Willeboordse
(Netherlands) 2009	(Japan) Yoshie Ueno	(Netherlands) Elisabeth Willeboordse	(Israel) Alice Schlesinger	(Germany) Claudia Malzahn
(Japan) 2010	(Japan) Yoshie Ueno	(Japan) Miki Tanaka	(Cuba) Yaritza Abel	(Azerbaijan) Ramila Yusubova
(France) 2011	(France) Gévrise Émane	(Japan) Yoshie Ueno	(Netherlands) Anicka van Emden	(Slovenia) Urška Žolnir
(Brazil) 2013	(Israel) Yarden Gerbi	(France) Clarisse Agbegnenou	(France) Gévrise Émane	(Netherlands) Anicka van Emden
(Russia) 2014	(France) Clarisse Agbegnenou	(Israel) Yarden Gerbi	(Japan) Miku Tashiro	(Slovenia) Tina Trstenjak
(Kazakhstan) 2015	(Slovenia) Tina Trstenjak	(France) Clarisse Agbegnenou	(Japan) Miku Tashiro	(Mongolia) Tsedevsürengiin Mönkhzayaa
(Hungary) 2017	(France) Clarisse Agbegnenou	(Slovenia) Tina Trstenjak	(Poland) Agata Ozdoba	(Mongolia) Baldorjyn Möngönchimeg
(Azerbaijan) 2018	(France) Clarisse Agbegnenou	(Japan) Miku Tashiro	(Slovenia) Tina Trstenjak	(Netherlands) Juul Franssen
(Japan) 2019	(France) Clarisse Agbegnenou	(Japan) Miku Tashiro	(Germany) Martyna Trajdos	(Netherlands) Juul Franssen
(Hungary) 2021	(France) Clarisse Agbegnenou	(Slovenia) Andreja Leški	(Serbia) Anja Obradović	(Netherlands) Sanne Vermeer
(Uzbekistan) 2022	(Japan) Megumi Horikawa	(Canada) Catherine Beauchemin-Pinard	(France) Manon Deketer	(Portugal) Bárbara Timo
(Qatar) 2023	(France) Clarisse Agbegnenou	(Slovenia) Andreja Leški	(Hungary) Szofi Özbas	(Netherlands) Joanne van Lieshout
(United Arab Emirates) 2024	(Netherlands) Joanne van Lieshout	(Poland) Angelika Szymańska	(France) Clarisse Agbegnenou	(Kosovo) Laura Fazliu
(Hungary) 2025	(Japan) Haruka Kaju	(Canada) Catherine Beauchemin-Pinard	(Mongolia) Boldyn Gankhaich	(Kosovo) Laura Fazliu
(Azerbaijan) 2026	(Japan) Haruka Kaju	(Israel) Kerem Primo	(Mongolia) Lkhagvatogoogiin Enkhriilen	(Czech Republic) Renata Zachová

=== Middleweight ===
- 66 kg (1980–1997)
- 70 kg (1999–)

Year	Gold	Silver	Bronze	
(United States) 1980	(Austria) Edith Simon	(United Kingdom) Dawn Netherwood	(United States) Christine Penick	(France) Catherine Pierre
(France) 1982	(France) Brigitte Deydier	(West Germany) Karin Krüger	(Norway) Heidi Anderson	(Netherlands) Anita Staps
(Austria) 1984	(France) Brigitte Deydier	(Netherlands) Irene de Kok	(Japan) Shinobu Kandori	(United Kingdom) Dawn Netherwood
(Netherlands) 1986	(France) Brigitte Deydier	(Sweden) Elisabeth Karlsson	(West Germany) Alexandra Schreiber	(Netherlands) Anita Staps
(West Germany) 1987	(West Germany) Alexandra Schreiber	(France) Brigitte Deydier	(Austria) Roswitha Hartl	(Japan) Hikari Sasaki
(Socialist Federal Republic of Yugoslavia) 1989	(Italy) Emanuela Pierantozzi	(Japan) Hikari Sasaki	(France) Claire Lecat	(Cuba) Odalis Revé
(Spain) 1991	(Italy) Emanuela Pierantozzi	(Cuba) Odalis Revé	(Japan) Ryoko Fujimoto	(United Kingdom) Kate Howey
(Canada) 1993	(South Korea) Cho Min-sun	(United States) Liliko Ogasawara	(Cuba) Odalis Revé	(China) Di Zhang
(Japan) 1995	(South Korea) Cho Min-sun	(Cuba) Odalis Revé	(United States) Liliko Ogasawara	(Poland) Aneta Szczepańska
(France) 1997	(United Kingdom) Kate Howey	(Germany) Anja von Rekowski	(Italy) Emanuela Pierantozzi	(South Korea) Cho Min-sun
(United Kingdom) 1999	(Cuba) Sibelis Veranes	(Belgium) Ulla Werbrouck	(Italy) Ylenia Scapin	(United Kingdom) Kate Howey
(Germany) 2001	(Japan) Masae Ueno	(United Kingdom) Kate Howey	(Belgium) Ulla Werbrouck	(Cuba) Regla Leyén
(Japan) 2003	(Japan) Masae Ueno	(Cuba) Regla Leyén	(Netherlands) Edith Bosch	(Germany) Annett Böhm
(Egypt) 2005	(Netherlands) Edith Bosch	(France) Gévrise Émane	(Belgium) Catherine Jacques	(Slovenia) Raša Sraka
(Brazil) 2007	(France) Gévrise Émane	(United States) Ronda Rousey	(Italy) Ylenia Scapin	(Hungary) Anett Mészáros
(Netherlands) 2009	(Colombia) Yuri Alvear	(Hungary) Anett Mészáros	(Japan) Mina Watanabe	(Tunisia) Houda Miled
(Japan) 2010	(France) Lucie Décosse	(Hungary) Anett Mészáros	(Japan) Yoriko Kunihara	(Slovenia) Raša Sraka
(France) 2011	(France) Lucie Décosse	(Netherlands) Edith Bosch	(Japan) Yoriko Kunihara	(Hungary) Anett Mészáros
(Brazil) 2013	(Colombia) Yuri Alvear	(Germany) Laura Vargas Koch	(Netherlands) Kim Polling	(South Korea) Kim Seong-yeon
(Russia) 2014	(Colombia) Yuri Alvear	(Japan) Karen Nun-Ira	(Cuba) Onix Cortés	(Poland) Katarzyna Kłys
(Kazakhstan) 2015	(France) Gévrise Émane	(Spain) María Bernabéu	(Colombia) Yuri Alvear	(France) Fanny Estelle Posvite
(Hungary) 2017	(Japan) Chizuru Arai	(Puerto Rico) María Pérez	(Colombia) Yuri Alvear	(Spain) María Bernabéu
(Azerbaijan) 2018	(Japan) Chizuru Arai	(France) Marie-Ève Gahié	(Colombia) Yuri Alvear	(Japan) Yoko Ono
(Japan) 2019	(France) Marie-Ève Gahié	(Portugal) Bárbara Timo	(France) Margaux Pinot	(United Kingdom) Sally Conway
(Hungary) 2021	(Croatia) Barbara Matić	(Japan) Yoko Ono	(Netherlands) Sanne van Dijke	(Austria) Michaela Polleres
(Uzbekistan) 2022	(Croatia) Barbara Matić	(Croatia) Lara Cvjetko	(Netherlands) Sanne van Dijke	(Japan) Saki Niizoe
(Qatar) 2023	(Japan) Saki Niizoe	(Germany) Giovanna Scoccimarro	(Croatia) Barbara Matić	(Austria) Michaela Polleres
(United Arab Emirates) 2024	(France) Margaux Pinot	(France) Marie-Ève Gahié	(Japan) Shiho Tanaka	Madina Taimazova
(Hungary) 2025	(Japan) Shiho Tanaka	(Croatia) Lara Cvjetko	(Netherlands) Sanne van Dijke	(Germany) Miriam Butkereit
(Azerbaijan) 2026	(Spain) Ai Tsunoda	(Austria) Michaela Polleres	(Germany) Giovanna Scoccimarro	(Russia) Madina Taimazova

=== Half Heavyweight ===
- 72 kg (1980–1997)
- 78 kg (1999–)

Year	Gold	Silver	Bronze	
(United States) 1980	(France) Jocelyne Triadou	(West Germany) Barbara Claßen	(United Kingdom) Avril Malley	(Netherlands) Jolanda van Meggelen
(France) 1982	(West Germany) Barbara Claßen	(Belgium) Ingrid Berghmans	(Austria) Karin Posch	(France) Jocelyne Triadou
(Austria) 1984	(Belgium) Ingrid Berghmans	(West Germany) Barbara Claßen	(Netherlands) Anita Staps	(France) Véronique Vigneron
(Netherlands) 1986	(Netherlands) Irene de Kok	(Belgium) Ingrid Berghmans	(West Germany) Barbara Claßen	(China) Liu Aixiang
(West Germany) 1987	(Netherlands) Irene de Kok	(Belgium) Ingrid Berghmans	(West Germany) Barbara Claßen	(Japan) Yoko Tanabe
(Socialist Federal Republic of Yugoslavia) 1989	(Belgium) Ingrid Berghmans	(Japan) Yoko Tanabe	(France) Aline Batailler	(China) Wu Weifeng
(Spain) 1991	(South Korea) Kim Mi-jung	(Japan) Yoko Tanabe	(France) Laetitia Meignan	(Netherlands) Marion van Dorssen
(Canada) 1993	(China) Leng Chunhui	(United Kingdom) Kate Howey	(Russia) Victoria Kazounina	(South Korea) Kim Mi-jung
(Japan) 1995	(Cuba) Diadenis Luna	(Belgium) Ulla Werbrouck	(Ukraine) Tetyana Belajeva	(Japan) Yoko Tanabe
(France) 1997	(Japan) Noriko Anno	(Cuba) Diadenis Luna	(Belgium) Ulla Werbrouck	(Brazil) Edinanci Silva
(United Kingdom) 1999	(Japan) Noriko Anno	(China) Yin Yufeng	(Cuba) Diadenis Luna	(France) Céline Lebrun
(Germany) 2001	(Japan) Noriko Anno	(Cuba) Yurisel Laborde	(South Korea) Lee So-yeon	(France) Céline Lebrun
(Japan) 2003	(Japan) Noriko Anno	(Cuba) Yurisel Laborde	(Brazil) Edinanci Silva	(Spain) Esther San Miguel
(Egypt) 2005	(Cuba) Yurisel Laborde	(Japan) Sae Nakazawa	(Netherlands) Claudia Zwiers	(France) Céline Lebrun
(Brazil) 2007	(Cuba) Yurisel Laborde	(Japan) Sae Nakazawa	(South Korea) Jeong Gyeong-mi	(France) Stéphanie Possamaï
(Netherlands) 2009	(Netherlands) Marhinde Verkerk	(Ukraine) Maryna Pryshchepa	(Germany) Heide Wollert	(China) Yi Sun
(Japan) 2010	(United States) Kayla Harrison	(Brazil) Mayra Aguiar	(Japan) Akari Ogata	(China) Yang Xiuli
(France) 2011	(France) Audrey Tcheuméo	(Japan) Akari Ogata	(United States) Kayla Harrison	(Brazil) Mayra Aguiar
(Brazil) 2013	(North Korea) Sol Kyong	(Netherlands) Marhinde Verkerk	(France) Audrey Tcheuméo	(Brazil) Mayra Aguiar
(Russia) 2014	(Brazil) Mayra Aguiar	(France) Audrey Tcheuméo	(United States) Kayla Harrison	(Slovenia) Anamari Velenšek
(Kazakhstan) 2015	(Japan) Mami Umeki	(Slovenia) Anamari Velenšek	(Germany) Luise Malzahn	(Netherlands) Marhinde Verkerk
(Hungary) 2017	(Brazil) Mayra Aguiar	(Japan) Mami Umeki	(Cuba) Kaliema Antomarchi	(United Kingdom) Natalie Powell
(Azerbaijan) 2018	(Japan) Shori Hamada	(Netherlands) Guusje Steenhuis	(Russia) Aleksandra Babintseva	(Netherlands) Marhinde Verkerk
(Japan) 2019	(France) Madeleine Malonga	(Japan) Shori Hamada	(Kosovo) Loriana Kuka	(Brazil) Mayra Aguiar
(Hungary) 2021	(Germany) Anna-Maria Wagner	(France) Madeleine Malonga	(Japan) Mami Umeki	(Netherlands) Guusje Steenhuis
(Uzbekistan) 2022	(Brazil) Mayra Aguiar	(China) Ma Zhenzhao	(Ukraine) Yelyzaveta Lytvynenko	(Poland) Beata Pacut-Kloczko
(Qatar) 2023	(Israel) Inbar Lanir	(France) Audrey Tcheuméo	(Italy) Alice Bellandi	(Netherlands) Guusje Steenhuis
(United Arab Emirates) 2024	(Germany) Anna-Maria Wagner	(Italy) Alice Bellandi	(France) Madeleine Malonga	(United Kingdom) Emma Reid
(Hungary) 2025	(Italy) Alice Bellandi	(Germany) Anna Monta Olek	(Japan) Kurena Ikeda	(Portugal) Patrícia Sampaio
(Azerbaijan) 2026	(United Arab Emirates) Yelyzaveta Lytvynenko	(France) Kaïla Issoufi	(Japan) Kurena Ikeda	(Germany) Anna Monta Olek

=== Heavyweight ===
- 72+ kg (1980–1997)
- 78+ kg (1999–)

Year	Gold	Silver	Bronze	
(United States) 1980	(Italy) Margherita De Cal	(France) Paulette Fouillet	(Belgium) Ingrid Berghmans	(West Germany) Christiane Kieburg
(France) 1982	(France) Natalina Lupino	(United States) Margaret Castro	(Italy) Maria Teresa Motta	(Netherlands) Marjolein van Unen
(Austria) 1984	(Italy) Maria Teresa Motta	(China) Gao Fenglian	(United States) Margaret Castro	(Netherlands) Marjolein van Unen
(Netherlands) 1986	(China) Gao Fenglian	(Netherlands) Marjolein van Unen	(France) Isabelle Paque	(Puerto Rico) Nilmaris Santini
(West Germany) 1987	(China) Gao Fenglian	(West Germany) Regina Sigmund	(United States) Margaret Castro	(Netherlands) Angelique Seriese
(Socialist Federal Republic of Yugoslavia) 1989	(China) Gao Fenglian	(West Germany) Regina Sigmund	(France) Natalina Lupino	(Poland) Beata Maksymow
(Spain) 1991	(South Korea) Mun Ji-yun	(China) Zhang Ying	(Poland) Beata Maksymow	(Netherlands) Monique van der Lee
(Canada) 1993	(Germany) Johanna Hagn	(Japan) Noriko Anno	(Russia) Svetlana Goundarenko	(Netherlands) Monique van der Lee
(Japan) 1995	(Netherlands) Angelique Seriese	(China) Ying Zhang	(Cuba) Daima Beltrán	(South Korea) Son Hyeon-mi
(France) 1997	(France) Christine Cicot	(Japan) Miho Ninomiya	(China) Sun Fuming	(Poland) Beata Maksymow
(United Kingdom) 1999	(Poland) Beata Maksymow	(China) Yuan Hua	(Japan) Miho Ninomiya	(United Kingdom) Karina Bryant
(Germany) 2001	(China) Yuan Hua	(Japan) Midori Shintani	(Cuba) Daima Beltrán	(Germany) Sandra Köppen
(Japan) 2003	(China) Sun Fuming	(Japan) Maki Tsukada	(Russia) Tea Donguzashvili	(United Kingdom) Karina Bryant
(Egypt) 2005	(China) Tong Wen	(United Kingdom) Karina Bryant	(France) Anne-Sophie Mondière	(Japan) Maki Tsukada
(Brazil) 2007	(China) Tong Wen	(Japan) Maki Tsukada	(Germany) Sandra Köppen	(Netherlands) Carola Uilenhoed
(Netherlands) 2009	(China) Tong Wen	(United Kingdom) Karina Bryant	(Japan) Maki Tsukada	(Cuba) Idalys Ortiz
(Japan) 2010	(Japan) Mika Sugimoto	(China) Qin Qian	(Japan) Maki Tsukada	(Cuba) Idalys Ortiz
(France) 2011	(China) Tong Wen	(China) Qin Qian	(Japan) Maki Tsukada	(Russia) Elena Ivashchenko
(Brazil) 2013	(Cuba) Idalys Ortiz	(Brazil) Maria Suelen Altheman	(Japan) Megumi Tachimoto	(South Korea) Lee Jung-eun
(Russia) 2014	(Cuba) Idalys Ortiz	(Brazil) Maria Suelen Altheman	(Japan) Megumi Tachimoto	(France) Émilie Andéol
(Kazakhstan) 2015	(China) Yu Song	(Japan) Megumi Tachimoto	(Cuba) Idalys Ortiz	(Japan) Kanae Yamabe
(Hungary) 2017	(China) Yu Song	(Japan) Sarah Asahina	(South Korea) Kim Min-jeong	(Azerbaijan) Iryna Kindzerska
(Azerbaijan) 2018	(Japan) Sarah Asahina	(Cuba) Idalys Ortiz	(Bosnia and Herzegovina) Larisa Cerić	(Turkey) Kayra Sayit
(Japan) 2019	(Japan) Akira Sone	(Cuba) Idalys Ortiz	(Japan) Sarah Asahina	(Turkey) Kayra Sayit
(Hungary) 2021	(Japan) Sarah Asahina	(Japan) Wakaba Tomita	(Brazil) Beatriz Souza	(Brazil) Maria Suelen Altheman
(Uzbekistan) 2022	(France) Romane Dicko	(Brazil) Beatriz Souza	(Japan) Wakaba Tomita	(France) Julia Tolofua
(Qatar) 2023	(Japan) Akira Sone	(France) Julia Tolofua	(Brazil) Beatriz Souza	(Israel) Raz Hershko
(United Arab Emirates) 2024	(Japan) Wakaba Tomita	(Turkey) Kayra Ozdemir	(Turkey) Hilal Öztürk	(South Korea) Kim Ha-yun
(Hungary) 2025	(South Korea) Kim Ha-yun	(Japan) Mao Arai	(France) Romane Dicko	(South Korea) Lee Hyeon-ji
(Azerbaijan) 2026	(South Korea) Lee Hyeon-ji	(France) Romane Dicko	(Russia) Mariia Ivanova	(Israel) Raz Hershko

=== Openweight ===
Year	Gold	Silver	Bronze	
(United States) 1980	(Belgium) Ingrid Berghmans	(France) Paulette Fouillet	(West Germany) Barbara Claßen	(United States) Barbara Fest
(France) 1982	(Belgium) Ingrid Berghmans	(Japan) Hiromi Tateishi	(West Germany) Regina Sigmund	(France) Jocelyne Triadou
(Austria) 1984	(Belgium) Ingrid Berghmans	(Netherlands) Marjolein van Unen	(China) Gao Fenglian	(France) Natalina Lupino
(Netherlands) 1986	(Belgium) Ingrid Berghmans	(China) Li Jinlin	(West Germany) Karin Kutz	(France) Laetitia Meignan
(West Germany) 1987	(China) Gao Fenglian	(Belgium) Ingrid Berghmans	(West Germany) Karin Kutz	(France) Isabelle Paque
(Socialist Federal Republic of Yugoslavia) 1989	(Cuba) Estela Rodríguez	(United Kingdom) Sharon Lee	(Japan) Yoko Tanabe	(China) Zhang Ying
(Spain) 1991	(China) Zhuang Xiaoyan	(Cuba) Estela Rodríguez	(France) Nathalie Lupino	(Germany) Claudia Weber
(Canada) 1993	(Poland) Beata Maksymow	(Netherlands) Angelique Seriese	(South Korea) Mun Ji-yun	(China) Ying Zhang
(Japan) 1995	(Netherlands) Monique van der Lee	(China) Sun Fuming	(South Korea) Lee Hyun-Kyung	(Cuba) Estela Rodríguez
(France) 1997	(Cuba) Daima Beltrán	(Spain) Raquel Barrientos	(China) Yuan Hua	(Japan) Miho Ninomiya
(United Kingdom) 1999	(Cuba) Daima Beltrán	(Japan) Miho Ninomiya	(Bulgaria) Tsvetana Bozhilova	(South Korea) Choi Sook-ie
(Germany) 2001	(France) Céline Lebrun	(United Kingdom) Karina Bryant	(Portugal) Catarina Rodrigues	(China) Tong Wen
(Japan) 2003	(China) Tong Wen	(United Kingdom) Karina Bryant	(Serbia and Montenegro) Mara Kovačević	(Cuba) Daima Beltrán
(Egypt) 2005	(Japan) Midori Shintani	(United Kingdom) Karina Bryant	(Netherlands) Carola Uilenhoed	(France) Anne-Sophie Mondière
(Brazil) 2007	(Japan) Maki Tsukada	(Slovenia) Lucija Polavder	(Russia) Elena Ivashchenko	(France) Anne-Sophie Mondière
(France) 2008	(China) Tong Wen	(Russia) Elena Ivashchenko	(Japan) Megumi Tachimoto	(Japan) Mika Sugimoto
(Japan) 2010	(Japan) Mika Sugimoto	(China) Qin Qian	(Japan) Megumi Tachimoto	(Russia) Tea Donguzashvili
(Russia) 2011	(China) Tong Wen	(Russia) Tea Donguzashvili	(Japan) Mika Sugimoto	(Japan) Nanami Hashiguchi
(Morocco) 2017	(Japan) Sarah Asahina	(Bosnia and Herzegovina) Larisa Cerić	(Cuba) Idalys Ortiz	(Tunisia) Nihel Cheikh Rouhou

=== Team ===
Year	Gold	Silver	Bronze	
(Japan) 1997	Cuba	South Korea	France	Japan
(Belarus) 1998	Cuba	France	China	Belgium
(Switzerland) 2002	Japan	Cuba	China	Italy
(France) 2006	France	Cuba	China	Japan
(China) 2007	China	Cuba	Mongolia	Japan
(Japan) 2008	Japan	France	China	Germany
(Turkey) 2010	Netherlands	Germany	Japan	Turkey
(France) 2011	France	Japan	Cuba	Germany
(Brazil) 2012	Japan	China	Cuba	Brazil
(Brazil) 2013	Japan	Brazil	Cuba	France
(Russia) 2014	France	Mongolia	Germany	Japan
(Kazakhstan) 2015	Japan	Poland	Germany	Russia

== Mixed ==
=== Team ===
Year	Gold	Silver	Bronze	
(Hungary) 2017	Japan	Brazil	France	South Korea
(Azerbaijan) 2018	Japan	France	Russia	Korea (Note: At the 2018 World Championships, judokas from North Korea and South Korea completed for unified Korean team in the Mixed team competition.)
(Japan) 2019	Japan	France	Russia	Brazil
(Hungary) 2021	Japan	France	Uzbekistan	Brazil
(Uzbekistan) 2022	Japan	France	Germany	Israel
(Qatar) 2023	Japan	France	Netherlands	Georgia
(United Arab Emirates) 2024	Japan	France	Italy	Georgia
(Hungary) 2025	Georgia	South Korea	Japan	Germany
(Azerbaijan) 2026	Japan	Russia	Uzbekistan	Georgia

== See also ==
- List of Olympic medalists in judo
