= 1987 European Judo Championships =

1987 Judo European Judo Championships
- Location: Paris, France
- Dates: 7–10 May 1987

Competition at external databases
- Links: JudoInside

The 1987 European Judo Championships were the seventeenth edition of the European Judo Championships, held in Paris, France, from 7 to 10 May 1987. Medallists included Irene de Kok, Ingrid Berghmans, and Grigory Verichev.

== Medal summary ==
=== Men's events ===
Event	Gold	Silver	Bronze
Extra-lightweight (−60 kg)	Patrick Roux (FRA)	Khazret Tletseri (URS)	Neil Eckersley (GBR)
Extra-lightweight (−60 kg)	Patrick Roux (FRA)	Khazret Tletseri (URS)	Helmut Dietz (FRG)
Half-lightweight (−65 kg)	Jean-Pierre Hansen (FRA)	Dragomir Bečanović (YUG)	Sergei Kosmynin (URS)
Half-lightweight (−65 kg)	Jean-Pierre Hansen (FRA)	Dragomir Bečanović (YUG)	Tamás Bujkó (HUN)
Lightweight (−71 kg)	Wiesław Błach (POL)	Richard Melillo (FRA)	Steffen Stranz (FRG)
Lightweight (−71 kg)	Wiesław Błach (POL)	Richard Melillo (FRA)	Sven Loll (GDR)
Half-middleweight (−78 kg)	Bashir Varaev (URS)	Jean-Michel Berthet (FRA)	Peter Reiter (AUT)
Half-middleweight (−78 kg)	Bashir Varaev (URS)	Jean-Michel Berthet (FRA)	Andrzej Sądej (POL)
Middleweight (−86 kg)	Fabien Canu (FRA)	Densign White (GBR)	Viktor Poddubnyi (URS)
Middleweight (−86 kg)	Fabien Canu (FRA)	Densign White (GBR)	Peter Seisenbacher (AUT)
Half-heavyweight (−95 kg)	Koba Kurtanidze (URS)	Roger Vachon (FRA)	Robert Van de Walle (BEL)
Half-heavyweight (−95 kg)	Koba Kurtanidze (URS)	Roger Vachon (FRA)	Marc Meiling (FRG)
Heavyweight (+95 kg)	Mihai Cioc (ROU)	Clemens Jehle (SUI)	Alexander von der Groeben (FRG)
Heavyweight (+95 kg)	Mihai Cioc (ROU)	Clemens Jehle (SUI)	Akaki Kibordzalidze (URS)
Openweight	Grigory Verichev (URS)	Christian Vachon (FRA)	Andrzej Basik (POL)
Openweight	Grigory Verichev (URS)	Christian Vachon (FRA)	Jochen Plate (FRG)

Source results:

=== Women's events ===
Event	Gold	Silver	Bronze
Extra-lightweight (−48 kg)	Karen Briggs (GBR)	Anna Chodakowska (POL)	Anita van der Pas (NED)
Extra-lightweight (−48 kg)	Karen Briggs (GBR)	Anna Chodakowska (POL)	Martine Dupond (FRA)
Half-lightweight (−52 kg)	Dominique Maaoui-Brun (FRA)	Edith Hrovat (AUT)	Alessandra Giungi (ITA)
Half-lightweight (−52 kg)	Dominique Maaoui-Brun (FRA)	Edith Hrovat (AUT)	Sharon Rendle (GBR)
Lightweight (−56 kg)	Catherine Arnaud (FRA)	Ann Hughes (GBR)	Regina Philips (FRG)
Lightweight (−56 kg)	Catherine Arnaud (FRA)	Ann Hughes (GBR)	Maria Gontowicz-Szałas (POL)
Half-middleweight (−61 kg)	Bogusława Olechnowicz (POL)	Chita Gross (NED)	Gabi Ritschel (FRG)
Half-middleweight (−61 kg)	Bogusława Olechnowicz (POL)	Chita Gross (NED)	Diane Bell (GBR)
Middleweight (−66 kg)	Chantal Han (NED)	Karin Krueger (FRG)	Jolanta Adamczyk (POL)
Middleweight (−66 kg)	Chantal Han (NED)	Karin Krueger (FRG)	Michèle Lionnet (FRA)
Half-heavyweight (−72 kg)	Irene de Kok (NED)	Ingrid Berghmans (BEL)	Stefania Drzewicka (POL)
Half-heavyweight (−72 kg)	Irene de Kok (NED)	Ingrid Berghmans (BEL)	Annamaria Colagrossi (ITA)
Heavyweight (+72 kg)	Isabelle Paque (FRA)	Angelique Seriese (NED)	Angela Medina (ESP)
Heavyweight (+72 kg)	Isabelle Paque (FRA)	Angelique Seriese (NED)	Karin Kutz (FRG)
Openweight	Ingrid Berghmans (BEL)	Regina Sigmund (FRG)	Irene de Kok (NED)
Openweight	Ingrid Berghmans (BEL)	Regina Sigmund (FRG)	Laetitia Meignan (FRA)

Source results:

=== Medal table ===
* Host nation (France)

Rank	Nation	Gold	Silver	Bronze	Total
1	France (FRA)*	6	4	3	13
2	Soviet Union (URS)	3	1	3	7
3	Netherlands (NED)	2	2	2	6
4	Poland (POL)	2	1	5	8
5	Great Britain (GBR)	1	2	3	6
6	Belgium (BEL)	1	1	1	3
7	Romania	1	0	0	1
8	West Germany (FRG)	0	2	8	10
9	Austria (AUT)	0	1	2	3
10	Switzerland (SUI)	0	1	0	1
10	Yugoslavia (YUG)	0	1	0	1
12	Italy (ITA)	0	0	2	2
13	East Germany (GDR)	0	0	1	1
13	Hungary (HUN)	0	0	1	1
13	Spain (ESP)	0	0	1	1
Totals (15 entries)		16	16	32	64
