= Karen Briggs =

Karen Briggs may refer to:

- Karen Briggs (musician) (born 1963), American violinist
- Karen Briggs (judoka) (born 1963), British judoka
