= Donna Guy-Halkyard =

New Zealand judoka (born 1961)

Personal information
- Born: Donna Guy; 1 November 1961 (age 65) Rotorua, New Zealand
- Years active: 1986–1990

Sport
- Country: New Zealand
- Sport: Judo
Medal record
Judo
Representing New Zealand
World Judo Championships
Bronze medal – third place	1986 Maastricht	Under 61 kg
Commonwealth Games
Silver medal – second place	1990 Auckland	Under 61 kg

Donna Guy-Halkyard (née Guy; born 1 November 1961) is a New Zealand former judoka, who won a bronze medal at the 1986 World Judo Championships, and won a silver medal at the 1990 Commonwealth Games.

== Personal life ==
Guy-Halkyard is from Rotorua, New Zealand.

== Career ==
At the 1986 World Judo Championships, Guy won a bronze medal in the under 61 kg event. She is the only New Zealander to have won a medal at the World Judo Championships. In the same year, Guy came second at the judo demonstration event at the 1986 Commonwealth Games in Edinburgh, Scotland, losing in the final to Diane Bell. Guy also competed for New Zealand at the 1988 Summer Olympics in Seoul, South Korea. At the 1990 Commonwealth Games in Auckland, New Zealand, Guy-Halkyard came second in the under 61 kg event, losing to Briton Diane Bell in the final.

== Post-career ==
After retiring, Guy-Halkyard took up judo coaching, but retired in 1997 after a mountain biking accident. In 2014, Guy-Halkyard was the inaugural member of the Judo New Zealand Hall of Fame.
