= Marc Vallot =

Belgian judoka

Personal information
- Nationality: Belgian
- Citizenship: Belgium
- Born: 24 May 1962; Ougrée, Belgium
- Died: 26 February 2001 (aged 38); Liège, Belgium
- Occupation: Former international judo competitor & judo coach
- Years active: 1970–2001
- Weight: 78 kg (172 lb)
- Spouse(s): Ingrid Berghmans (1990–2001; separated since 2000 and in the process of divorce at the time of death)

Sport
- Country: Belgium
- Sport: Judo
- Rank: Ligue Francophone Belge de Judo (LFJ) 5th dan
- Club: Judo Club Neupré
- Team: Belgium
- Coached by: Roger Detaille, Joël Callu, Georges Bouvier
- Updated on 29 November 2012

Marc Vallot (24 May 1962 – 26 February 2001) was one of several highly talented Belgian -78 kg judoka from Belgium during the 1980s and early 1990s. He probably gained more international fame though through his marriage to legendary 6-fold world champion women's judo Ingrid Berghmans.

== Early life ==
Vallot was born in Ougrée, Wallonia. He took up judo in Ougrée near Seraing in the province of Liège. His original judo teacher was Roger Detaille.

== Career ==
Vallot already became a successful judoka while still in his youth. He was a technically skilled judoka whose specialty was right Uchi-mata or inner thigh throw. Vallot won a gold medal in the 1986 Open Swedish International Tournament and in the 1989 Swiss Open. Between 1983–1989 he won seven national titles in the -78 kg of which five in the senior division. He also won one silver and two bronze medals in the -78 kg nationals. His main competitors were Johan Boon, Carl De Crée, Johan Laats, David Letor, and nl:Eddy Van de Cauter, with whom he alternated the -78 kg position in the national team. Vallot also won a silver medal in the 1988 Open category, which was held in a separate championship which soon after was abolished, and with his Judo Club Neupré he also won three national team championships. Vallot held the judo rank of 5th dan issued by the Ligue Francophone de Judo, regional subfederation of the Belgian Judo Federation. His successor within the Belgian national team was Johan Laats, and Vallot became more involved in coaching and founded a new club under the name "Dojo Liégois". In February 2001 upon returning from the important Paris Judo Tournament Vallot suffered cardiac arrest. He was resuscitated and transported to Liège, where on 26 February 2001 he died following a heart attack at age 38.

== Personal ==
In 1990 Vallot was married to legendary women's judo world champion Ingrid Berghmans. According to then national coach and current Belgian senator Jean-Marie Dedecker the two got involved while Berghmans was still in a relationship with Belgian former Olympic Champion Robert Van De Walle. Although technically the marriage lasted eleven years, Vallot and Berghmans had been living separated for a year at the time of Vallot's death, and the divorce proceedings were ongoing. Vallot left two children behind from his marriage with Berghmans, Maxime and Manon.
