= 1984 World Judo Championships =

Judo competition

Judo 1984 Women's World Judo Championships
- Venue: Vienna
- Location: Vienna, Austria
- Dates: 10–11 November 1984
- Competitors: 184 from 32 nations

Competition at external databases
- Links: IJF • JudoInside

The 1984 World Judo Championships were the third edition of the women's World Judo Championships, and were held in Vienna, Austria from 10–11 November 1984.

== Medal overview ==
=== Women ===
Event	Gold	Silver	Bronze
-48 kg	(United Kingdom) Karen Briggs	Marie-France Colignon	(United States) Darlene Anaya (Australia) Julie Reardon
-52 kg	(Japan) Kaori Yamaguchi	(Austria) Edith Hrovat	(Australia) Christina-Ann Boyd (Poland) Joanna Majdan
-56 kg	(United States) AnnMaria Burns	(Australia) Suzanne Williams	(France) Catherine Arnaud (Austria) Gerda Winklbauer
-61 kg	(Venezuela) Natasha Hernández	(Netherlands) Chantal Han	(Japan) Kaori Hachinohe (France) Martine Rottier
-66 kg	(France) Brigitte Deydier	(Netherlands) Irene de Kok	(Japan) Shinobu Kandori (United Kingdom) Dawn Netherwood
-72 kg	(Belgium) Ingrid Berghmans	(Germany) Barbara Claßen	(Netherlands) Anita Staps (France) Véronique Vigneron
+72 kg	(Italy) Maria Teresa Motta	(China) Gao Fenglian	(United States) Margaret Castro (Netherlands) Marjolein van Unen
Open	(Belgium) Ingrid Berghmans	(Netherlands) Marjolein van Unen	(China) Gao Fenglian (France) Nathalie Lupino

=== Medal table ===
Rank	Nation	Gold	Silver	Bronze	Total
1	Belgium (BEL)	2	0	0	2
2	France (FRA)	1	1	4	6
3	Japan (JPN)	1	0	2	3
3	United States (USA)	1	0	2	3
5	Great Britain (GBR)	1	0	1	2
6	Italy (ITA)	1	0	0	1
6	Venezuela (VEN)	1	0	0	1
8	Netherlands (NED)	0	3	2	5
9	Australia (AUS)	0	1	2	3
10	Austria (AUT)	0	1	1	2
10	China (CHN)	0	1	1	2
12	West Germany (FRG)	0	1	0	1
13	Poland (POL)	0	0	1	1
Totals (13 entries)		8	8	16	32
