= Karin Posch =

Personal information
- Born: 14 December 1961 (age 63)
- Occupation: Judoka

Sport
- Sport: Judo
- Club: PSV Salzburg

Profile at external databases
- IJF: 57750
- JudoInside.com: 5682

Karin Posch (born December 14, 1961) is a former Austrian judoka. She was third in the 1982 World Championships and second in the 1985 European Championships.

== Judo career ==
Karin Posch was Austrian light heavyweight champion in 1980, 1981 and from 1983 to 1985, in the weight class -72 kg. In 1986 she won the heavyweight category.

Posch won her first international medal at the 1981 European Championships in Madrid, when she won bronze in the light heavyweight division. At the 1982 World Championships in Paris, she lost in the quarterfinals to the German Barbara Claßen. With victories over the Norwegian Kari Nordheim and the Australian Geraldine Dekker, Posch won a bronze medal.

At the 1983 European Championships in Genoa, Posch won two bronze medals. In the light heavyweight division, she lost in the round of 16 to Belgian Ingrid Berghmans, and in the open class she lost in the semifinals to Berghmans. In both classes, Posch reached the fight for bronze, which she won in the light heavyweight division against the Dutch Marieke Blauw and in the open class against the French Véronique Vigneron. At the 1984 World Championships in Vienna, Posch was eliminated in the round of 16 in both the light heavyweight and open classes.

In 1985, at the European Championships in Landskrona, she lost in the semi-final of the light heavyweight division to Barbara Claßen, but won the fight for bronze against the Dutchwoman Anita Staps. In the open class, Posch reached the final with a semi-final victory over the Frenchwoman Laetitia Meignan and received the silver medal behind the Dutchwoman Marjolein van Unen.
