= 1982 World Judo Championships =

Judo competition

Judo 1982 Women's World Judo Championships
- Venue: Stade Pierre de Coubertin
- Location: Paris, France
- Dates: 4–5 December 1982
- Competitors: 174 from 37 nations

Competition at external databases
- Links: IJF • JudoInside

The 1982 World Judo Championships were the second edition of the women's World Judo Championships, and were held in Paris, France from 4–5 December, 1982.

== Medal overview ==
=== Women ===
Event	Gold	Silver	Bronze
-48 kg	(United Kingdom) Karen Briggs	Marie-France Colignon	(Netherlands) Jola Bink (Japan) Hitomi Nakahara
-52 kg	(United Kingdom) Loretta Doyle	(Japan) Kaori Yamaguchi	(Australia) Christina-Ann Boyd (France) Pascale Doger
-56 kg	(France) Béatrice Rodriguez	(Australia) Suzanne Williams	(United States) Eve Aronoff (United Kingdom) Diane Bell
-61 kg	(France) Martine Rottier	(Norway) Inger Lise Solheim	(Belgium) Jeannine Peeters (Germany) Gabriele Ritschel
-66 kg	(France) Brigitte Deydier	(Germany) Karin Krüger	(Norway) Heidi Anderson (Netherlands) Anita Staps
-72 kg	(Germany) Barbara Claßen	(Belgium) Ingrid Berghmans	(Austria) Karin Posch (France) Jocelyne Triadou
+72 kg	(France) Nathalie Lupino	(United States) Margaret Castro	(Italy) Maria Teresa Motta (Netherlands) Marjolein van Unen
Open	(Belgium) Ingrid Berghmans	(Japan) Hiromi Tateishi	(Germany) Regina Sigmund (France) Jocelyne Triadou

=== Medal table ===
Rank	Nation	Gold	Silver	Bronze	Total
1	France (FRA)	4	1	3	8
2	Great Britain (GBR)	2	0	1	3
3	West Germany (FRG)	1	1	2	4
4	Belgium (BEL)	1	1	1	3
5	Japan (JPN)	0	2	1	3
6	Australia (AUS)	0	1	1	2
6	Norway (NOR)	0	1	1	2
6	United States (USA)	0	1	1	2
9	Netherlands (NED)	0	0	3	3
10	Austria (AUT)	0	0	1	1
10	Italy (ITA)	0	0	1	1
Totals (11 entries)		8	8	16	32
