= Diane Bell (judoka) =

British judoka (born 1963)

Personal information
- Nationality: British (English)
- Born: 11 October 1963 (age 62) Corbridge, Northumberland
- Occupation: Judoka

Sport
- Country: Great Britain
- Sport: Judo
- Weight class: ‍–‍61 kg
- Club: Fairholme

Achievements and titles
- Olympic Games: (gold) (1988)
- World Champ.: (1986, 1987)
- European Champ.: (gold) (1984, 1986, 1988)
- Commonwealth Games: (gold) (1990)
Medal record
Women's judo
Representing Great Britain
Olympic Games
Gold medal – first place	1988 Seoul	‍–‍61 kg
World Championships
Gold medal – first place	1986 Maastricht	‍–‍61 kg
Gold medal – first place	1987 Essen	‍–‍61 kg
Silver medal – second place	1991 Barcelona	‍–‍61 kg
Bronze medal – third place	1982 Paris	‍–‍56 kg
Bronze medal – third place	1993 Hamilton	‍–‍61 kg
European Championships
Gold medal – first place	1984 Pirmasens	‍–‍56 kg
Gold medal – first place	1986 London	‍–‍61 kg
Gold medal – first place	1988 Pamplona	‍–‍61 kg
Silver medal – second place	1990 Frankfurt	‍–‍61 kg
Silver medal – second place	1994 Gdansk	‍–‍61 kg
Silver medal – second place	1995 Birmingham	‍–‍61 kg
Bronze medal – third place	1985 Landskrona	‍–‍56 kg
Bronze medal – third place	1987 Paris	‍–‍61 kg
Bronze medal – third place	1989 Helsinki	‍–‍61 kg
Bronze medal – third place	1993 Athens	‍–‍61 kg
Bronze medal – third place	1996 The Hague	‍–‍61 kg
Representing England
Commonwealth Games
Gold medal – first place	1990 Auckland	‍–‍61 kg

Profile at external databases
- IJF: 58378
- JudoInside.com: 2268
- Updated on 18 June 2023

Diane Bell (born 11 October 1963) is a British former judoka. She won the 56–61 kg event at the 1988 Summer Olympics in Seoul, but at the time women's judo was still a demonstration sport, so unlike the men Bell did not enter the list of Olympic medalists in judo. She also won two World Judo Championships, a Commonwealth Games gold and three European Judo Championships.

== Judo career ==
Bell won the World Judo Championships in 1986 and 1987, and the European Championships in 1984, 1986 and 1988. Bell is Britain's most successful judoka at the European Judo Championships. In total, she has won 3 gold, 3 silver and 5 bronze medals. In 1986, she won the 56–61 kg event at the 1986 Commonwealth Games; the event was a demonstration sport.

In 1988, she won the 56–61 kg event at the 1988 Summer Olympics; judo was a demonstration sport at the Games. Bell represented England at the 1990 Commonwealth Games in Auckland, New Zealand, and won a gold medal in the 61 kg half-middleweight. Bell beat New Zealander Donna Guy-Halkyard in the final. Bell also competed at the 1992 and 1996 Summer Olympics.

In addition to her international titles, she is a four times champion of Great Britain, winning the lightweight division at the British Judo Championships in 1982 and 1983 and the light-middleweight division in 1992 and 1994.

== Coaching ==
In 1997, Bell took up coaching. At the 2000 Summer Olympics in Sydney, Bell cut Deborah Allan's hair on the weighing scales after Allan was found to be 400 grams (14 oz) over the weight limit for her event.
