= Eve Aronoff =

American judoka

Eve Aronoff-Trivella (born July 10, 1963) is a former Olympic judoka from the United States.

== Early life ==
Aronoff-Trivella attended Woodlands High School and Westchester Community College. Aronoff-Trivella studied judo at Yonkers YMCA. Aronoff Trivella was a student of the late Rusty Kanokogi who was responsible for getting women's Judo in the Olympic Games in 1988. She initially lived in Hartsdale, NY. Aronoff-Trivella served at the YMCA Judo Camp as a guest instructor. She runs her own company as a fitness and judo instructor, and volunteers time teaching older people modified Judo falls for safety.

She earned a black belt at age 15. At 16 she became a member of the All American Women's Judo Team. She held 28 major titles by age 16. She won her first fitness competition at age 11 and was in the top 2 percent in NY State physical fitness all 4 years of high school. She was Woodlands High School's outstanding athlete although judo is not a part of the curriculum.

== Career ==
Aronoff-Trivella competed in the 56 kg division. She earned a bronze medal in the 1982 World Judo Championships at the age of 19 the youngest male or female in American history to take a medal in the Sr. World Judo Championships and finished 7th in 1987 World Championships. Member of the historical First Woman's Olympic Judo Team in 1988 where she earned a 6th-place finish. She took medals in 14 National Championships, 12 Sr. 2 Jr. Eve was the first Judo recipient of the prestigious Olympian Award, sanctioned by the U.S. Olympic Committee in recognition of young athletes who have made significant contributions to the various Olympic disciplines. She was inducted into the United States Judo Association Hall Of Fame as an outstanding female competitor as well as being inducted into the United States Judo Federation Hall Of Fame.Her results also include:

1982 World Championships, Bronze Medal Paris France 1987 World Championships, 7th place Germany 5-time U.S. Open champion 5-time Olympic Festival Champion

- Silver medal First Fukuoka Japan Woman's world competition.
- Bronze medal First Russian Woman's International Invitational
- Gold Medal Pan American Championships
- Silver medal Leonding World Tournament Leonding, Austria
- Bronze medal Dutch Open
- Silver and Bronze Medal Pacific Rim International Championships.
- Silver medle at the 1987 Pan American Games.
- Member of the US Olympic Team. 6th place in the 1988 Seoul Olympics.
