= Maria Teresa Motta =

Italian judoka (born 1963)

Personal information
- Born: 19 April 1963 (age 63) Sanremo, Italy
- Occupation: Judoka

Sport
- Country: Italy
- Sport: Judo
- Weight class: +72 kg, Open
- Club: G.S. Fiamme Oro

Achievements and titles
- Olympic Games: 7th (1988)
- World Champ.: (1984)
- European Champ.: (gold) (1983)
Medal record
Women's judo
Representing Italy
World Championships
Gold medal – first place	1984 Vienna	+72 kg
Bronze medal – third place	1982 Paris	+72 kg
European Championships
Gold medal – first place	1983 Genoa	+72 kg
Silver medal – second place	1983 Genoa	Open
Silver medal – second place	1984 Pirmasens	Open
Bronze medal – third place	1981 Madrid	Open
Bronze medal – third place	1984 Pirmasens	+72 kg
Bronze medal – third place	1985 Landskrona	+72 kg
Bronze medal – third place	1990 Frankfurt	+72 kg

Profile at external databases
- IJF: 53868
- JudoInside.com: 5331
- Updated on 8 May 2024

Maria Teresa Motta (born 19 April 1963) is an Italian former judoka. She competed in the women's heavyweight event at the 1992 Summer Olympics. Motta is a former athlete of the Gruppo Sportivo Fiamme Oro.
