= Ingrid Berghmans =

Belgian judoka

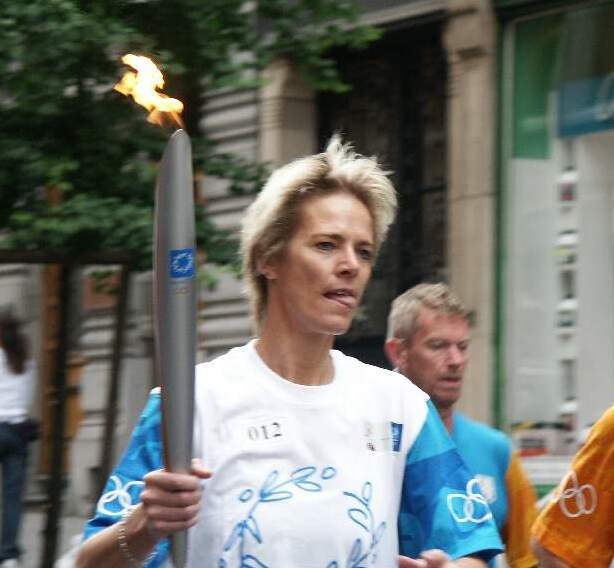
- Berghmans with Olympic flame, Brussels 2004

Personal information
- Born: 24 August 1961 (age 64)
- Occupation: Judoka

Sport
- Country: Belgium
- Sport: Judo
- Weight class: –72 kg, +72 kg, Open

Achievements and titles
- Olympic Games: (gold) (1988)
- World Champ.: (1980, 1982, 1984, 1984, 1986, 1989)
- European Champ.: (gold) (1983, 1983, 1985, 1987, 1988, 1988, 1989)
Medal record
Women's judo
Representing Belgium
Olympic Games
Gold medal – first place	1988 Seoul	‍–‍72 kg
World Championships
Gold medal – first place	1980 New York	Open
Gold medal – first place	1982 Paris	Open
Gold medal – first place	1984 Vienna	‍–‍72 kg
Gold medal – first place	1984 Vienna	Open
Gold medal – first place	1986 Maastricht	Open
Gold medal – first place	1989 Belgrade	‍–‍72 kg
Silver medal – second place	1982 Paris	‍–‍72 kg
Silver medal – second place	1986 Maastricht	‍–‍72 kg
Silver medal – second place	1987 Essen	‍–‍72 kg
Silver medal – second place	1987 Essen	Open
Bronze medal – third place	1980 New York	+72 kg
European Championships
Gold medal – first place	1983 Genoa	‍–‍72 kg
Gold medal – first place	1983 Genoa	Open
Gold medal – first place	1985 Landskrona	‍–‍72 kg
Gold medal – first place	1987 Paris	Open
Gold medal – first place	1988 Pamplona	‍–‍72 kg
Gold medal – first place	1988 Pamplona	Open
Gold medal – first place	1989 Helsinki	‍–‍72 kg
Silver medal – second place	1980 Udine	‍–‍72 kg
Silver medal – second place	1980 Udine	Open
Silver medal – second place	1981 Madrid	Open
Silver medal – second place	1987 Paris	‍–‍72 kg
Bronze medal – third place	1981 Madrid	‍–‍72 kg
Bronze medal – third place	1986 London	‍–‍72 kg
Bronze medal – third place	1989 Helsinki	Open

Profile at external databases
- IJF: 14162
- JudoInside.com: 4690
- Updated on 18 June 2023

Ingrid Berghmans (born 24 August 1961 in Koersel), also known as Ingrid Vallot, is a judoka from Belgium who has eight times been named Belgian Sportswoman of the Year. A former world title holder, she is also an Olympic competitor. She won the gold medal in the –72 kg class at the 1988 Summer Olympics, where women's judo appeared as a demonstration sport for the first time.

She was married to fellow Belgian judoka Marc Vallot.
