= AnnMaria De Mars =

American judoka

Personal information
- Nickname: The Animal
- Born: AnnMaria Waddell; August 15, 1958 (age 67) Scott Air Force Base, St. Clair County, Illinois, U.S.
- Education: Washington University in St. Louis (B.S.); University of Minnesota (M.B.A.); University of California, Riverside (Ph.D.)
- Occupations: CEO of 7 Generation Games; CEO of The Julia Group
- Weight: 56 kg (123 lb)
- Spouses: Ronald Rousey (m. 1985; died 1995) Dennis De Mars (m. 1997)

Sport
- Country: United States
- Sport: Judo
- Rank: 7th dan black belt
Medal record
Women's judo
Representing United States
World Championships
Gold medal – first place	1984 Vienna	-56 kg

Profile at external databases
- JudoInside.com: 6000

AnnMaria De Mars (née Waddell; born August 15, 1958) is an American technology executive, author and judoka. She is the first American to win a gold medal at the World Judo Championships, competing in the -56 kg weight class, for the 1984 World Judo Tournament.

De Mars is the chief executive officer of 7 Generation Games and The Julia Group, as well as a statistical consultant and activist, having authored grants for various Native American programs. Before she launched 7 Generation Games as its CEO, De Mars was Vice President of Spirit Lake Consulting Inc., a tribal institute based on the Spirit Lake Tribe Indian Reservation and was actively involved in the Tribe's Education and Vocational Rehabilitation programs.

In 2013, De Mars was named in Forbes' annual list of the "40 Women to Watch Over 40" recognizing the accomplishments and backgrounds of women who are making major professional contributions after the age of 40, in the fields of innovation and disruption. In 2016, she was inducted into the International Sports Hall of Fame.

== Early life ==
She was raised in the small community of Alton, Illinois.

== Career ==
=== 1970–1995 ===
De Mars began her judo career at the age of 12 at a local YMCA.

De Mars won her division at the USJA Junior Nationals at the age of 16 – her first major competition. The same year, she entered college at Washington University in St. Louis as a Business major. At the age of 18, as a college junior, De Mars was an exchange student at Waseda University in Tokyo, Japan. While there, she trained under Sensei Osawa.

She graduated from college with a degree in business in 1978. She also won the US Senior Nationals, US Collegiate Nationals and the US Open. In the absence of women's judo world championships, she quit competitive judo and studied for an MBA at the University of Minnesota.

De Mars earned her MBA in 1980. She missed the first women's world championships while in grad school, but in 1981 won bronze in the British Open and Tournoi d'Orleans. In 1982, she was ranked #1 in the USJI rankings and won the US Open. However, she did not contest the second women's world championships due to the birth of her daughter María. De Mars pursued further study, including an MA and PhD in Educational Psychology from the University of California, Riverside; which came in handy while teaching her daughter Ronda the proper mindset to take before fights.

De Mars enjoyed more success in 1983, including the Pan American Games and US Senior Nationals, and in 1984, winning the Austrian Open, Canada Cup (now known as the "Rendezvous"), and the US Senior Nationals. She came out of retirement to win the 1984 World Judo Championships, becoming the first person representing the United States to win a World Judo Championships (her name at the time was Ann-Maria Burns).

=== 1995–present ===
In 1995, De Mars' then-husband Ronald Rousey suffered a sledding accident which resulted in a broken back and chronic pain. Later, he was diagnosed with Bernard–Soulier syndrome, which complicated his pre-existing injuries and he was given a prognosis of two years to live. He later committed suicide. Following this, De Mars moved her family back to Southern California and settled in Santa Monica, where she homeschooled her children.

Following the move, De Mars remarried, and helped coach her daughter Ronda Rousey, to win a gold medal at the 2004 World Junior Judo Championships and a bronze medal at the 2008 Olympics. Ronda is now a professional mixed martial artist and a former UFC Women's Bantamweight Champion.

De Mars frequently coaches and spars at a gym in Los Angeles, where she can recall breaking her wrist the first time Ronda finished a throw against her: "I didn't really think I was going to go, you know, so I put my hand out and she caught me", De Mars said. De Mars would "always, always, always tell kids don't reach for the mat."

In 2013, De Mars and Jimmy Pedro Sr. co-wrote the instructional book Winning on the Ground, published by Black Belt books.

Her philosophy in judo argues for an offense-centered attack.

I have always argued that the best defense is a good offense. If you are attacking your opponent, half of their attention has to be spent on defending your attacks, so they are going to be much less effective in attacking you. Whether as a coach or competitor, it's best to keep this in mind—You don’t fight principles, you fight people. I had a serious injury when I was young—I have since had a total knee replacement, an option that did not exist back then. Because of that disability, my standing technique was very limited and it was necessary for me to take the opponent to the ground as soon as possible before my knee gave out on me and I fell. Standing around waiting to defend an attack was not an option for me.

== Teaching and technology ==
De Mars began working for the Spirit Lake Reservation in 1990, where she wrote the first federal grant to tribes for early childhood tracking with special education staff from all the reservations in North Dakota. She also wrote and taught the first course offered over the internet by a tribal college. While there, De Mars performed evaluations for talent search, vocational rehabilitation, Health Careers Opportunity Program (HCOP), Even Start Family Literacy and SAMHSA Grants.

In the founding of 7 Generation Games, De Mars' focus comes from

The belief that children fall behind in school early in mathematics and it hurts their opportunities their whole lives. They have no one to help them understand fractions or decimals and all of the rest of math uses that. Before 8th grade they have decided that math is not for them. They end up dropping out of high school and their entire lives are compromised. If there was only something we could do

The origin of her passion project (7 Generation Games) grew from her love of statistics and outreach.

Spirit Lake is one in a series of 7 games we are going to create. My idea for a math game came following meeting my partner (Dr. Erich Longie) and I attended in Washington, D.C. to analyze the National Indian Education Study. The results showed that the more time students spent studying their culture, the worse they did in math. The hours have to come out of the school day somewhere and in many schools they seemed to come out of the math instruction. Erich was president of the school board on his reservation at the time and he told me, "We need to come up with a way to incorporate math and culture because I'm not willing to give up either one in my grandkids' education." Our team designed and developed a game that is a 3-D virtual world where kids are attacked by wolves, hunt buffalo, escape from enemies and have to use math at every turn. The villain says, "I dug a pit every 3 feet. It's 33 feet to the lake, moo-ha ha (evil villain laugh). How many pits are there? If the player gets the answer correct, they continue, jumping over the pits and escaping. If not, they are routed to a page or video where they study and then have to pass a quiz to get back into the game."

In 2008, De Mars was hired by the University of Southern California ITS Customer Support Department as a statistical consultant. She has over 27 years experience working in SAS and has contributed through her many Wiki and Blog Pages. She supports both UPC and HSC Campuses including the satellite office in Orange County.

== Personal life ==
De Mars is the mother of Ronda Rousey, an Olympic bronze medalist judoka and former UFC Bantamweight world champion. She is also the mother of María Burns Ortiz, a sports journalist who serves as the social media columnist for ESPN.com and as a contributor to Fox News Latino.

De Mars is Catholic.
