= Brigitte Deydier =

French judoka (born 1958)

Personal information
- Born: 12 November 1958 (age 67)
- Occupation: Judoka

Sport
- Country: France
- Sport: Judo
- Weight class: ‍–‍61 kg, ‍–‍66 kg

Achievements and titles
- Olympic Games: (silver) (1988)
- World Champ.: (1982, 1984, 1986)
- European Champ.: (gold) (1979, 1984, 1985, 1986)
Medal record
Women's judo
Representing France
Olympic Games
Silver medal – second place	1988 Seoul	‍–‍66 kg
World Championships
Gold medal – first place	1982 Paris	‍–‍66 kg
Gold medal – first place	1984 Vienna	‍–‍66 kg
Gold medal – first place	1986 Maastricht	‍–‍66 kg
Silver medal – second place	1987 Essen	‍–‍66 kg
European Championships
Gold medal – first place	1979 Kerkrade	‍–‍61 kg
Gold medal – first place	1984 Pirmasens	‍–‍66 kg
Gold medal – first place	1985 Landskrona	‍–‍66 kg
Gold medal – first place	1986 London	‍–‍66 kg
Silver medal – second place	1980 Udine	‍–‍61 kg
Bronze medal – third place	1988 Pamplona	‍–‍66 kg

Profile at external databases
- IJF: 53855
- JudoInside.com: 5107
- Updated on 18 June 2023

Brigitte Deydier (born 12 November 1958) is a retired French judoka who is an officer of the Legion of Honour. She chaired the France Sport Association from 2001 to 2004 and is general director of the 2018 Ryder Cup.

Deydier also won a silver medal in the ‍–‍61 kg division at the 1988 Summer Olympics in Seoul, where women's judo was held as a demonstration sport.
