= Judo New Zealand =

New Zealand judoka

- Sport: Judo
- Jurisdiction: New Zealand
- Abbreviation: JNZ
- Founded: 1952
- Affiliation: IJF
- Regional affiliation: OJU
- Headquarters: New Zealand
- President: Derek Maggs
- Men's coach: Jason King
- Women's coach: Esthe Reedy-Velloza

Official website
- judonz.org
- (New Zealand)

Judo New Zealand (JNZ) is the National Sporting Organisation recognised by the New Zealand Sports Commission for the sport of judo in New Zealand.

== History ==
The body was founded in Auckland in 1952.

== Structure ==
The national body has six state member associations.

The main tournament they organise is the annual New Zealand National Judo Championships.

== See also ==
- List of judo organizations
- Judo by country
