= 1986 World Judo Championships =

Judo competition

Judo 1986 Women's World Judo Championships
- Venue: Geusseltpark
- Location: Maastricht, Netherlands
- Dates: 24–26 October 1986
- Competitors: 162 from 35 nations

Competition at external databases
- Links: IJF • JudoInside

The 1986 World Judo Championships were the fourth and final edition of the women's World Judo Championships, and were held in Maastricht, the Netherlands from October 24 to 26 1986. The men's competition and women's competition were merged and held in the same venue from 1987 onwards.

== Medal overview ==
=== Women ===
| Event | Gold | Silver | Bronze |
|---|---|---|---|
| -48 kg | (United Kingdom) Karen Briggs | (Japan) Fumiko Ezaki | (France) Fabienne Boffin (China) Li Zhongyun |
| -52 kg | (France) Dominique Brun | (Japan) Kaori Yamaguchi | (South Korea) Ock Kyoung-sook (United Kingdom) Sharon Rendle |
| -56 kg | (United Kingdom) Ann Hughes | (Poland) Maria Gontowicz | (Netherlands) Chita Gross (France) Béatrice Rodriguez |
| -61 kg | (United Kingdom) Diane Bell | (France) Céline Géraud | (Japan) Ryoko Fujimoto (New Zealand) Donna Guy |
| -66 kg | (France) Brigitte Deydier | (Sweden) Elisabeth Karlsson | (Germany) Alexandra Schreiber (Netherlands) Anita Staps |
| -72 kg | (Netherlands) Irene de Kok | (Belgium) Ingrid Berghmans | (Germany) Barbara Claßen (China) Liu Aixiang |
| +72 kg | (China) Gao Fenglian | (Netherlands) Marjolein van Unen | (France) Isabelle Paque (Puerto Rico) Nilmaris Santini |
| Open | (Belgium) Ingrid Berghmans | (China) Li Jinlin | (Germany) Karin Kutz (France) Laetitia Meignan |

=== Medal table ===
| Rank | Nation | Gold | Silver | Bronze | Total |
|---|---|---|---|---|---|
| 1 | Great Britain (GBR) | 3 | 0 | 1 | 4 |
| 2 | France (FRA) | 2 | 1 | 4 | 7 |
| 3 | China (CHN) | 1 | 1 | 2 | 4 |
| 3 | Netherlands (NED) | 1 | 1 | 2 | 4 |
| 5 | Belgium (BEL) | 1 | 1 | 0 | 2 |
| 6 | Japan (JPN) | 0 | 2 | 1 | 3 |
| 7 | Poland (POL) | 0 | 1 | 0 | 1 |
| 7 | Sweden (SWE) | 0 | 1 | 0 | 1 |
| 9 | West Germany (FRG) | 0 | 0 | 3 | 3 |
| 10 | New Zealand (NZL) | 0 | 0 | 1 | 1 |
| 10 | Puerto Rico (PUR) | 0 | 0 | 1 | 1 |
| 10 | South Korea (KOR) | 0 | 0 | 1 | 1 |
| Totals (12 entries) | | 8 | 8 | 16 | 32 |
