= 2012 World Team Judo Championships – Women's team =

Judo competition

Judo Women's team at the 2012 World Team Judo Championships
- Venue: Salvador
- Location: Salvador, Brazil
- Dates: 27–28 October 2012
- Competitors: 95 from 16 nations

Medalists
gold medal	Japan (3rd title)
silver medal	China
bronze medal	Cuba
bronze medal	Brazil

Competition at external databases
- Links: IJF • EJU • JudoInside

The women's team competition at the 2012 World Team Judo Championships was held on 27 and 28 of October in Salvador, Brazil.

== Results ==
Round of 16
France	1
China	4
Argentina	0
Russia	5
Germany	1
South Korea	4
Ukraine	2
Mongolia	3
Japan	4
Great Britain	1
Mexico	1
Brazil	4
Cuba	5
Algeria	0
United States	1
Turkey	4

Quarter-finals
China	3
Russia	2
South Korea	2
Mongolia	3
Japan	3
Brazil	2
Cuba	4
Turkey	1

Semi-finals
China	3
Mongolia	2
Japan	5
Cuba	0

Final
China	2
Japan	3

=== Repechage ===
Repechage
Russia	4
South Korea	1

Third place
Russia	2
Cuba	3

Repechage
Brazil	3
Turkey	2

Third place
Brazil	5
Mongolia	0
