= Nilmaris Santini =

Puerto Rican judoka (1959–2006)

Personal information
- Born: May 25, 1959 San Juan, Puerto Rico
- Died: March 25, 2006 (aged 46) San Juan, Puerto Rico
Medal record
Women's judo
Representing Puerto Rico
World Championships
Bronze medal – third place	1986 Maastricht	Heavyweight
Pan American Games
Gold medal – first place	1987 Indianapolis	Heavyweight
Silver medal – second place	1991 Havana	Heavyweight
Silver medal – second place	1991 Havana	Open Class

Nilmaris "Nilmari" Santini Martin (May 25, 1959 – March 25, 2006) was a female judoka from Puerto Rico. She competed for her native country at the 1992 Summer Olympics in Barcelona, Spain, where she was defeated in the second round of the repêchage.

Santini won two silver medals at the 1991 Pan American Games, in the Women's Heavyweight (+ 72 kg) and in the Women's Open Class division, after having claimed the gold medal four years earlier in Indianapolis, United States.

She died on March 25, 2006 at the age 46 in San Juan after a battle with cancer.
