= Kaori Moriyama =

Japanese judoka (born 1964)

Personal information
- Born: 4 January 1964 (age 62)
- Occupation: Judoka

Sport
- Sport: Judo
Medal record
Representing Japan
Women's Judo
World Championships
Bronze medal – third place	1984 Vienna	-61 kg
Asian Championships
Gold medal – first place	1985 Tokyo	-61 kg

Profile at external databases
- JudoInside.com: 5368

Kaori Moriyama (森山 かおり, Moriyama Kaori; née Hachinohe Hachinohe (八戸); born 4 January 1964) is a retired Japanese judo wrestler.

Moriyama is from Hakodate, Hokkaidō and began judo at the age of a junior high school second grader.

When she was a student of Tokai University, she studied under former world champion, Nobuyuki Sato and got bronze medal of World Championships in 1984. In the next year, she won the gold medal at Asian Championships, All-Japan Selected Championships, Kodokan Cup and All-Japan University Championships with her specialty techniques, Osotogari and Newaza.

She retired and became a teacher of the senior high school in Hokkaidō after graduation at a university in 1986. As of 2010, Moriyama coaches judo at high school in Kanagawa Prefecture.

== Achievements ==
- 1979 - All-Japan Selected Championships (-65 kg) 2nd
- 1980 - All-Japan Selected Championships (-61 kg) 2nd
- 1981 - All-Japan Selected Championships (-61 kg) 2nd
- 1982 - All-Japan Selected Championships (-61 kg) 1st
- 1983 - All-Japan Selected Championships (-61 kg) 1st
- 1984 - World Championships (-61 kg) 3rd

- All-Japan Selected Championships (-61 kg) 1st

- 1985 - Asian Championships (-61 kg) 1st

- All-Japan Selected Championships (-61 kg) 1st
- All-Japan University Championships (Openweight only) 1st

- 1986 - All-Japan Championships (Openweight only) 1st
