= Koba Kurtanidze =

Georgian judoka (1964-2005)

Personal information
- Nationality: Georgian
- Born: 13 October 1964 Gori, Georgia
- Died: 6 December 2005 (aged 41)
- Occupation: Judoka

Sport
- Country: Soviet Union
- Sport: Judo
- Weight class: ‍–‍95 kg

Achievements and titles
- World Champ.: (1989)
- European Champ.: (gold) (1987, 1989)
Medal record
Men's judo
Representing Soviet Union
World Championships
Gold medal – first place	1989 Belgrade	‍–‍95 kg
European Championships
Gold medal – first place	1987 Paris	‍–‍95 kg
Gold medal – first place	1989 Helsinki	‍–‍95 kg
Bronze medal – third place	1990 Frankfurt	‍–‍95 kg
European Junior Championships
Bronze medal – third place	1984 Cadiz	‍–‍95 kg
Summer Universiade
Bronze medal – third place	1985 Kobe	‍–‍95 kg

Profile at external databases
- IJF: 57839
- JudoInside.com: 3363
- Updated on 9 July 2024

Koba Kurtanidze (13 October 1964 – 6 December 2005) was a Soviet Judoka. Koba Kurtanidze won the 1989 European Judo Championships.
