= Darlene Anaya =

American judoka

Medal record

Women's Judo

Representing USA

World Judo Championships
Silver medal – second place	Silver	1984

Darlene Anya (Darlen Anya, Rosalie Darlene Anaya) is a former judoka for the United States. She was born on 20-Aug-1961. She competed in the 1984 World Judo Championships and would go on to win the silver medal in the under 48 kg division. She was elected the United States Judo Association Hall of Fame as an outstanding female competitor. She is a second generation judoka having been trained by her father Levi A. Anaya. She would go on to a career in law enforcement in her native Albuquerque, where she would be the first woman shot in the line of duty. She would receive the Purple Heart and would later retire.
