= Chantal Han =

Dutch judoka (born 1966)

Personal information
- Born: 26 July 1966 (age 59) Amsterdam, Netherlands
- Occupation: Judoka

Sport
- Country: Netherlands
- Sport: Judo
- Weight class: ‍–‍61 kg, ‍–‍66 kg

Achievements and titles
- Olympic Games: 9th (1992)
- World Champ.: (silver) (1984)
- European Champ.: (gold) (1987)
Medal record
Women's judo
Representing the Netherlands
World Championships
Silver medal – second place	1984 Vienna	‍–‍61 kg
European Championships
Gold medal – first place	1987 Paris	‍–‍66 kg
Silver medal – second place	1982 Oslo	‍–‍61 kg
Bronze medal – third place	1991 Prague	‍–‍66 kg

Profile at external databases
- IJF: 57597, 54725
- JudoInside.com: 1350
- Updated on 10 July 2024

Chantal Han (born 26 July 1966) is a Dutch judoka. She competed in the women's middleweight event at the 1992 Summer Olympics.
