= Yasuhiko Moriwaki =

Japanese judoka (born 1952)

Personal information
- Born: 7 May 1952 (age 74)
- Occupation: Judoka

Sport
- Sport: Judo
Medal record
Representing Japan
Men's Judo
World Championships
Gold medal – first place	1981 Maastricht	-60 kg
Bronze medal – third place	1979 Paris	-60 kg

Profile at external databases
- IJF: 62177
- JudoInside.com: 5432

Yasuhiko Moriwaki (森脇 保彦, Moriwaki Yasuhiko; born 7 May 1952) is a retired Japanese judoka.

Moriwaki is from Kake, Hiroshima and began judo at the junior high school days.

When he was a member of judo club at Sotoku high-school (崇徳高校, Sōtoku Kōkō), alongside Takao Kawaguchi and Yoshiharu Minami.

In 1974, When Moriwaki was a student of Kokushikan University, he won a gold medal at the World University Championships held in Brussels. He took office as the coach of Kokushikan University after graduation from there.

In 1979, Moriwaki won a bronze medal of World Championships held in Paris. He was also expected to get medal of Olympic Games in 1980 but he couldn't because the 1980 Summer Olympic Games was boycotted by the Japanese Government.

Moriwaki won a gold medal at the World Championships in 1981 at the age of 29.

As of 2010, he coaches at Kokushikan Women's Judo Club.

== Achievements ==
- 1970 - Inter-highschool championships (light weight) 1st
- 1974 - World University Championships (light weight) 1st
- 1975 - All-Japan Selected Championships (light weight) 3rd
- 1976 - All-Japan Selected Championships (light weight) 3rd
- 1976 - Kodokan Cup (-60 kg) 1st
- 1977 - All-Japan Selected Championships (-60 kg) 1st
- 1978 - Jigoro Kano Cup (-60 kg) 2nd
- 1978 - All-Japan Selected Championships (-60 kg) 3rd
- 1978 - Kodokan Cup (-60 kg) 2nd
- 1979 - World Championships (-60 kg) 3rd
- 1979 - All-Japan Selected Championships (-60 kg) 2nd
- 1979 - Kodokan Cup (-60 kg) 2nd
- 1980 - All-Japan Selected Championships (-60 kg) 1st
- 1981 - World Championships (-60 kg) 1st
- 1981 - All-Japan Selected Championships (-60 kg) 2nd
