= Barbara Claßen =

German judoka (1957–1990)

Personal information
- Born: 23 November 1957 Grenzach-Wyhlen, Germany
- Died: 13 June 1990 (aged 32) Grenzach-Wyhlen, Germany
- Occupation: Judoka

Sport
- Country: West Germany
- Sport: Judo
- Weight class: ‍–‍72 kg, Open

Achievements and titles
- Olympic Games: (bronze) (1988)
- World Champ.: (1982)
- European Champ.: (gold) (1978, 1979, 1980, 1981, 1984)
Medal record
Women's judo
Representing West Germany
Olympic Games
Bronze medal – third place	1988 Seoul	‍–‍72 kg
World Championships
Gold medal – first place	1982 Paris	‍–‍72 kg
Silver medal – second place	1980 New York	‍–‍72 kg
Silver medal – second place	1984 Vienna	‍–‍72 kg
Bronze medal – third place	1980 New York	Open
Bronze medal – third place	1986 Maastricht	‍–‍72 kg
Bronze medal – third place	1987 Essen	‍–‍72 kg
European Championships
Gold medal – first place	1978 Cologne	‍–‍72 kg
Gold medal – first place	1979 Kerkrade	Open
Gold medal – first place	1980 Udine	Open
Gold medal – first place	1981 Madrid	Open
Gold medal – first place	1984 Pirmasens	‍–‍72 kg
Silver medal – second place	1981 Madrid	‍–‍72 kg
Silver medal – second place	1982 Oslo	‍–‍72 kg
Silver medal – second place	1985 Landskrona	‍–‍72 kg
Silver medal – second place	1986 London	‍–‍72 kg
Bronze medal – third place	1977 Arlon	‍–‍72 kg
Bronze medal – third place	1979 Kerkrade	‍–‍72 kg
Bronze medal – third place	1980 Udine	‍–‍72 kg
Bronze medal – third place	1982 Oslo	Open
Bronze medal – third place	1983 Genoa	‍–‍72 kg
Bronze medal – third place	1983 Genoa	Open

Profile at external databases
- IJF: 53865
- JudoInside.com: 4787
- Updated on 18 June 2023

Barbara Claßen (23 November 1957 – 13 June 1990) was a German judoka. She won the bronze medal in the -72 kg class at the 1988 Summer Olympics, where women's judo appeared as a demonstration sport for the first time.

Claßen died at the age of 32, as a result of suicide.
