= Karen Briggs (judoka) =

British judoka (born 1963)

Karen Briggs MBE
Personal information
- Born: 11 April 1963 (age 63) Hull, East Riding of Yorkshire, England
- Occupation: Judoka

Sport
- Country: Great Britain
- Sport: Judo
- Weight class: ‍–‍48 kg
- Rank: 7th dan black belt
- Club: Kingston Fairholme

Achievements and titles
- Olympic Games: 5th (1992)
- World Champ.: (1982, 1984, 1986, 1989)
- European Champ.: (gold) (1982, 1983, 1984, 1986, 1987)
- Commonwealth Games: (gold) (1990)
Medal record
Women's judo
Representing Great Britain
World Championships
Gold medal – first place	1982 Paris	‍–‍48 kg
Gold medal – first place	1984 Vienna	‍–‍48 kg
Gold medal – first place	1986 Maastricht	‍–‍48 kg
Gold medal – first place	1989 Belgrade	‍–‍48 kg
Silver medal – second place	1991 Barcelona	‍–‍48 kg
European Championships
Gold medal – first place	1982 Oslo	‍–‍48 kg
Gold medal – first place	1983 Genoa	‍–‍48 kg
Gold medal – first place	1984 Pirmasens	‍–‍48 kg
Gold medal – first place	1986 London	‍–‍48 kg
Gold medal – first place	1987 Paris	‍–‍48 kg
Silver medal – second place	1989 Helsinki	‍–‍48 kg
Silver medal – second place	1990 Frankfurt	‍–‍48 kg
Silver medal – second place	1991 Prague	‍–‍48 kg
Bronze medal – third place	1981 Madrid	‍–‍48 kg
Bronze medal – third place	1985 Landskrona	‍–‍52 kg
Representing England
Commonwealth Games
Gold medal – first place	1990 Auckland	‍–‍48 kg

Profile at external databases
- IJF: 53430
- JudoInside.com: 4904
- Updated on 9 July 2024

Karen Valerie Briggs (married name Karen Inman) MBE (born 11 April 1963) is a British retired judoka. Internationally active throughout the 1980s and 1990s, Briggs was a multiple World (four-time) and European (five-time) champion, represented Great Britain at the 1992 Olympic Games, and won gold for England at the 1990 Commonwealth Games. She is a member of the IJF Hall of Fame, and recognised as one of the most successful British and female judoka of all time.

== Judo career ==
Briggs came to significant prominence after winning the gold medal at the 1982 World Judo Championships in the under 48 kg category. She went on to be world champion on four occasions winning five World Championship gold medals in her weight category at the 1984 World Judo Championships, in Vienna, the 1986 World Judo Championships, in Maastricht and the 1989 World Judo Championships, in Belgrade.

From 1982 to 1987 she was European champion five times after taking the gold medal at the European Judo Championships. In 1986, she won the gold medal in the 48 kg weight category at the judo demonstration sport event as part of the 1986 Commonwealth Games.

In 1990, she represented England and won a gold medal in the 48 kg extra-lightweight, at the 1990 Commonwealth Games in Auckland, New Zealand.

In 1992, she represented Great Britain at the 1992 Summer Olympics, this was the first time women's judo was included as an official Olympic sport (the first was as a demonstration event in 1988). She placed fifth after suffering a dislocated shoulder in the women's 48kg category.

In addition to her multiple international titles, she won the bantamweight division at the British Judo Championships in 1981, 1983, 1984 and 1991.

== Awards ==
In August 2015 Briggs was inducted into the IJF hall of fame.

== Personal life ==
She is married to Peter Inman, son of Olympic judo coach Roy Inman, and now teaches judo at schools in the East Riding of Yorkshire. On 9 July 2013 the University of Hull granted to Karen the award of Doctor of the University, honoris causa.
