= Anita Staps =

Dutch judoka (born 1961)

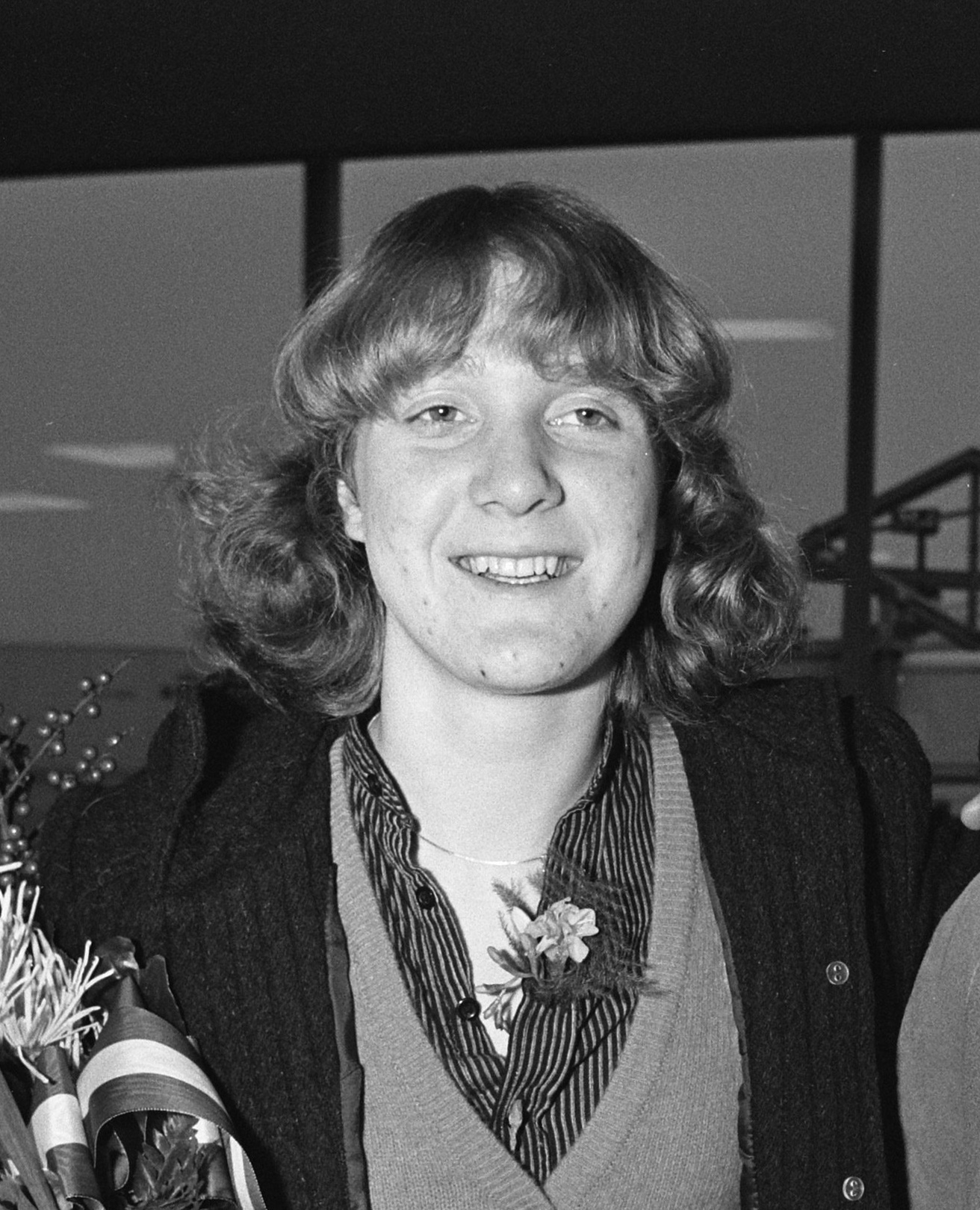
- Anita Staps in 1980

Personal information
- Born: 5 April 1961 (age 65) Tilburg
- Occupation: Judoka

Sport
- Sport: Judo
Medal record
Representing The Netherlands
World Championships
Gold medal – first place	1980 New York	-61 kg
Bronze medal – third place	1982 Paris	-66 kg
Bronze medal – third place	1984 Vienna	-72 kg
Bronze medal – third place	1986 Maastricht	-66 kg

Profile at external databases
- IJF: 57742
- JudoInside.com: 4517

Anita Staps (born 5 April 1961) is a retired judoka from the Netherlands. She won a world title in 1980, when women's competitions were first introduced to the World Judo Championships, and finished in third place at the next three consecutive championships. Between 1978 and 1986 she won seven national titles.

She retired in 1987 and became physiotherapist and fitness trainer, eventually establishing her own company Stapsgewijs in 1993.
