= Edith Hrovat =

Edith Kloibhofer
Personal information
- Nationality: Austria
- Born: Edith Hrovat; 15 January 1956 (age 70)
- Occupation: Judoka

Sport
- Sport: Judo
- Rank: 6th dan black belt
- Coached by: Ernst Raser

Profile at external databases
- IJF: 57535
- JudoInside.com: 5661

Edith Kloibhofer (née Hrovat; born 15 January 1956 in Sydney, Australia) is a former Austrian judoka. She holds the 6th Dan.

== Judo career ==
Edith Hrovat played for PSV Leoben and was trained by Siegfried Kloibhofer. When she first took part in the European Judo Championships in 1975 in Munich, she started in the lightweight division and immediately took first place. In the following years, she moved up a weight class and fought -52 kg. It was not until 1980 that she was unable to defend her title and took third place. In the same year, she won the title in New York City at the world championships, which were held for women for the first time. She won further European championship titles in 1981, 1982 and 1984. At the 1984 world championships in Vienna, she was only defeated in the final and came second. In 1984, she was voted Austrian Sportswoman of the Year. Edith Hrovat competed at the 1989 European Team Judo Championships in what was her final international competition. Together with the Austrian team, she won the bronze medal. Following this event, she concluded her active sporting career after a total of 20 years.

At the Leoben Sports Gala in 1990, she was honored for her sporting achievements.

After the end of her career, she married her trainer Siegfried Kloibhofer.

Kloibhofer worked as a traffic warden in Leoben for almost 40 years until she retired in 2016.
