= 1990 European Judo Championships =

1990 Judo European Judo Championships
- Location: Frankfurt, West Germany
- Dates: 10–13 May 1990

Competition at external databases
- Links: JudoInside

The 1990 European Judo Championships were held in Frankfurt, West Germany from 10 to 13 May 1990.

== Medal overview ==
=== Men ===
Event	Gold	Silver	Bronze
60 kg	(France) Philip Pradayrol	(United Kingdom) Nigel Donohue	(Bulgaria) Pavel Botev (Soviet Union) Amiran Totikashvili
65 kg	(France) Bruno Carabetta	(West Germany) Udo Quellmalz	(Belgium) Philip Laats (Romania) Stelian Petrescu
71 kg	(West Germany) Guido Schumacher	(Finland) Jorma Korhonen	(Poland) Wieslaw Blach (Hungary) Bertalan Hajtós
78 kg	(Soviet Union) Bashir Varaev	(Hungary) Zsolt Zsoldos	(France) Bertrand Amoussou-Guenou (Romania) Iulian Rusu
86 kg	(Poland) Waldemar Legien	(West Germany) Axel Lobenstein	(United Kingdom) Densign White (France) Fabien Canu
95 kg	(France) Stéphane Traineau	(West Germany) Marc Meiling	(Soviet Union) Koba Kurtanidze (East Germany) Frank Borkowski
95+ kg	(Soviet Union) Sergey Kosorotov	(Belgium) Harry Van Barneveld	(West Germany) Frank Möller (Romania) Marian Grozea
Open class	(Hungary) László Tolnai	(Belgium) Harry Van Barneveld	(Soviet Union) David Khakhaleishvili (West Germany) Alexander Von der Groeben

=== Women ===
Event	Gold	Silver	Bronze
48 kg	(France) Cécile Nowak	(United Kingdom) Karen Briggs	(West Germany) Jana Perlberg (Italy) Giovanna Tortora
52 kg	(United Kingdom) Sharon Rendle	(Hungary) Katalin Parragh	(Belgium) Christel Deliège (France) Fabienne Boffin
56 kg	(France) Cathérine Arnaud	(West Germany) Gudrun Hausch	(Belgium) Nicole Flagothier (United Kingdom) Nicola Fairbrother
61 kg	(Spain) Begoña Gómez	(United Kingdom) Diane Bell	(West Germany) Susann Singer (West Germany) Gabi Ritschel
66 kg	(West Germany) Alexandra Schreiber	(United Kingdom) Kate Howey	(France) Claire Lecat (Spain) Marimar Alcíbar
72 kg	(West Germany) Karin Krüger	(Soviet Union) Elena Besova	(Belgium) Ulla Werbrouck (France) Laëtitia Meignan
72+ kg	(United Kingdom) Sharon Lee	(France) Natalina Lupino	(Bulgaria) Tsvetana Bozhilova (Netherlands) Monique Aarts
Open class	(France) Christine Cicot	(West Germany) Regina Sigmund	(Netherlands) Monique van der Lee (Italy) Maria Teresa Motta

=== Medal table ===
Rank	Nation	Gold	Silver	Bronze	Total
1	France	6	1	5	12
2	West Germany	3	5	5	13
3	Great Britain	2	4	2	8
4	Soviet Union	2	1	3	6
5	Hungary	1	2	1	4
6	Poland	1	0	1	2
6	Spain	1	0	1	2
8	Belgium	0	2	4	6
9	Finland	0	1	0	1
10	Romania	0	0	3	3
11	Bulgaria	0	0	2	2
11	Italy	0	0	2	2
11	Netherlands	0	0	2	2
14	East Germany	0	0	1	1
Totals (14 entries)		16	16	32	64

== Results overview ==
=== Men ===
==== 60 kg ====
Position	Judoka	Country
1.	Philip Pradayrol	France
2.	Nigel Donohue	Great Britain
3.	Pavel Botev	Bulgaria
3.	Amiran Totikashvili	Soviet Union
5.	Richard Trautmann	West Germany
5.	Carlos Sotillo	Spain
7.	Guno Pocorni	Netherlands
7.	Haldun Efemgil	Turkey

==== 65 kg ====
Position	Judoka	Country
1.	Bruno Carabetta	France
2.	Udo Quellmalz	West Germany
3.	Philip Laats	Belgium
3.	Stelian Petrescu	Romania
5.	Mark Preston	Great Britain
5.	Piotr Sadowski	Poland
7.	József Csák	Hungary
7.	Stefan Buben	West Germany

==== 71 kg ====
Position	Judoka	Country
1.	Guido Schumacher	West Germany
2.	Jorma Korhonen	Finland
3.	Wieslaw Blach	Poland
3.	Bertalan Hajtós	Hungary
5.	Mike Schulz	West Germany
5.	Alparslan Ayan	Turkey
7.	Josef Vensek	Czech Republic
7.	Georgy Tenadze	Soviet Union

==== 78 kg ====
Position	Judoka	Country
1.	Bashir Varaev	Soviet Union
2.	Zsolt Zsoldos	Hungary
3.	Bertrand Amoussou-Guenou	France
3.	Iulian Rusu	Romania
5.	Marko Spittka	West Germany
5.	Roman Chynoranski	Czechoslovakia
7.	Lars Adolfsson	Sweden
7.	António Matias	Portugal

==== 86 kg ====
Position	Judoka	Country
1.	Waldemar Legien	Poland
2.	Axel Lobenstein	West Germany
3.	Densign White	Great Britain
3.	Fabien Canu	France
5.	Ben Spijkers	Netherlands
5.	León Villar	Spain
7.	Giorgio Vismara	Italy
7.	Ivan Todorov	Yugoslavia

==== 95 kg ====
Position	Judoka	Country
1.	Stéphane Traineau	France
2.	Marc Meiling	West Germany
3.	Koba Kurtanidze	Soviet Union
3.	Frank Borkowski	East Germany
5.	Radu Ivan	Romania
5.	Theo Meijer	Netherlands
7.	Marko Valev	Bulgaria
7.	Bjarni Fridriksson	Iceland

==== 95+ kg ====
Position	Judoka	Country
1.	Sergey Kosorotov	Soviet Union
2.	Harry Van Barneveld	Belgium
3.	Frank Möller	West Germany
3.	Marian Grozea	Romania
5.	Hans Buiting	Netherlands
5.	Jochen Plate	West Germany
7.	Elvis Gordon	Great Britain
7.	Imre Csösz	Hungary

==== Open class ====
Position	Judoka	Country
1.	László Tolnai	Hungary
2.	Harry Van Barneveld	Belgium
3.	David Khakhaleishvili	Soviet Union
3.	Alexander Von der Groeben	West Germany
5.	Elvis Gordon	Great Britain
5.	Marian Grozea	Romania
7.	Dennis Raven	Netherlands
7.	Juha Salonen	Finland

=== Women ===
==== 48 kg ====
Position	Judoka	Country
1.	Cécile Nowak	France
2.	Karen Briggs	Great Britain
3.	Jana Perlberg	West Germany
3.	Giovanna Tortora	Italy
5.	Michaela Bornemann	Austria
5.	Kerstin Emich	West Germany
7.	Leposava Markovic	Yugoslavia
7.	Tatyana Moskvina	Russia

==== 52 kg ====
Position	Judoka	Country
1.	Sharon Rendle	Great Britain
2.	Katalin Parragh	Hungary
3.	Christel Deliège	Belgium
3.	Fabienne Boffin	France
5.	Joanna Majdan	Poland
5.	Dolores Ortíz	Spain
7.	Jessica Gal	Netherlands
7.	Jaana Ronkainen	Finland

==== 56 kg ====
Position	Judoka	Country
1.	Cathérine Arnaud	France
2.	Gudrun Hausch	West Germany
3.	Nicole Flagothier	Belgium
3.	Nicola Fairbrother	Great Britain
5.	Miriam Blasco	Spain
5.	Ruth Magen	Israel
7.	Gooitske Marsman	Netherlands
7.	Ursula Myren	Sweden

==== 61 kg ====
Position	Judoka	Country
1.	Begoña Gómez	Spain
2.	Diane Bell	Great Britain
3.	Susann Singer	East Germany
3.	Gabi Ritschel	West Germany
5.	Jenny Gal	Italy
5.	Elena Petrova	Soviet Union
7.	Regula Bieri	Switzerland
7.	Gordana Tosinovic	Yugoslavia

==== 66 kg ====
Position	Judoka	Country
1.	Alexandra Schreiber	West Germany
2.	Kate Howey	Great Britain
3.	Claire Lecat	France
3.	Marimar Alcíbar	Spain
5.	Elena Kotelnikova	Soviet Union
5.	Ute Burmeister	West Germany
7.	Slavka Marojevic	Yugoslavia
7.	Kathrin Ott	Switzerland

==== 72 kg ====
Position	Judoka	Country
1.	Karin Krüger	West Germany
2.	Elena Besova	Soviet Union
3.	Ulla Werbrouck	Belgium
3.	Laëtitia Meignan	France
5.	Marion van Dorssen	Netherlands
5.	Zorica Blagojevic	Yugoslavia
7.	Chloe Cowen	Great Britain
7.	Martina Zangerl	Austria

==== 72+ kg ====
Position	Judoka	Country
1.	Sharon Lee	Great Britain
2.	Natalina Lupino	France
3.	Tsvetana Bozhilova	Bulgaria
3.	Monique Aarts	Netherlands
5.	Irina Steshenko	Soviet Union
5.	Isabel Cortavitarte	Spain
7.	Manuela Tondolo	Italy
7.	Heike Moeller	West Germany

==== Open class ====
Position	Judoka	Country
1.	Christine Cicot	France
2.	Regina Sigmund	West Germany
3.	Monique van der Lee	Netherlands
3.	Maria Teresa Motta	Italy
5.	Svetlana Gundarenko	Soviet Union
5.	Tsvetana Bozhilova	Bulgaria
7.	Sharon Lee	Great Britain
7.	Sara Herguezábal	Spain
