= 1991 European Judo Championships =

1991 Judo European Judo Championships
- Location: Prague, Czechoslovakia
- Dates: 16–19 May 1991

Competition at external databases
- Links: JudoInside

The 1991 European Judo Championships were held in Prague, Czechoslovakia from 16 to 19 May 1991.

== Medal overview ==
=== Men ===
Event	Gold	Silver	Bronze
60 kg	Philip Pradayrol (FRA)	Piotr Kamrowski (POL)	József Wagner (HUN); Marino Cattedra (ITA)
65 kg	Eric Born (SUI)	József Csák (HUN)	Martin Schmidt (GER); Ian Freeman (GBR)
71 kg	Stefan Dott (GER)	Josef Vensek (TCH)	Christophe Gagliano (FRA); Magomedbek Aliev (URS)
78 kg	Anthonie Wurth (NED)	Johan Laats (BEL)	Krzysztof Kamiński (POL); Bashir Varaev (URS)
86 kg	Axel Lobenstein (GER)	Giorgio Vismara (ITA)	Adrian Croitoru (ROM); León Villar (ESP)
95 kg	Theo Meijer (NED)	Givi Gaurgashvili (URS)	Stéphane Traineau (FRA); Detlef Knorrek (GER)
95 kg	Henry Stoehr (GER)	Sergey Kosorotov (URS)	Rafal Kubacki (POL); David Douillet (FRA)
Open class	Igor Bereznitsky (URS)	Bernd Von Eitzen (GER)	Patrice Rognon (FRA); Stefano Venturelli (ITA)

=== Women ===
Event	Gold	Silver	Bronze
48 kg	Cécile Nowak (FRA)	Karen Briggs (GBR)	Yolanda Soler (ESP); Giovanna Tortora (ITA)
52 kg	Jessica Gal (NED)	Loretta Doyle (GBR)	Alessandra Giungi (ITA); Fabienne Boffin (FRA)
56 kg	Miriam Blasco (ESP)	Gooitske Marsman (NED)	Cathérine Arnaud (FRA); Gudrun Hausch (GER)
61 kg	Zsuzsa Nagy (HUN)	Frauke Eickhoff (GER)	Yael Arad (ISR); Susanne Profanter (AUT)
66 kg	Isabelle Beauruelle (FRA)	Kate Howey (GBR)	Chantal Han (NED); Emanuela Pierantozzi (ITA)
72 kg	Laëtitia Meignan (FRA)	Elisabeth Karlsson (SWE)	Ulla Werbrouck (BEL); Marion van Dorssen (NED)
72+ kg	Beáta Maksymow (POL)	Claudia Weber (GER)	Svetlana Gundarenko (URS); Angelique Seriese (NED)
Open class	Monique van der Lee (NED)	Renata Szal (POL)	Karin Kutz (GER); Natalina Lupino (FRA)

=== Medal table ===
* Host nation (Czechoslovakia)

Rank	Nation	Gold	Silver	Bronze	Total
1	Netherlands	4	1	3	8
2	France	4	0	7	11
3	Germany	3	3	4	10
4	Soviet Union	1	2	3	6
5	Poland	1	2	2	5
6	Hungary	1	1	1	3
7	Spain	1	0	2	3
8	Switzerland	1	0	0	1
9	Great Britain	0	3	1	4
10	Italy	0	1	5	6
11	Belgium	0	1	1	2
12	Czechoslovakia*	0	1	0	1
12	Sweden	0	1	0	1
14	Austria	0	0	1	1
14	Israel	0	0	1	1
14	Romania	0	0	1	1
Totals (16 entries)		16	16	32	64

== Results overview ==
=== Men ===
==== 60 kg ====
Position	Judoka	Country
1.	Philip Pradayrol	France
2.	Pavel Kamrowski	Poland
3.	József Wagner	Hungary
3.	Marino Cattedra	Italy
5.	Ruslan Gamzatov	Soviet Union
5.	Peter Sedivak	Czechoslovakia
7.	Manfred Hiptmaier	Austria
7.	Richard West	Great Britain

==== 65 kg ====
Position	Judoka	Country
1.	Eric Born	Switzerland
2.	József Csák	Hungary
3.	Martin Schmidt	Germany
3.	Ian Freeman	Great Britain
5.	Bruno Carabetta	France
5.	Stelica Patrascu	Romania
7.	Philip Laats	Belgium
7.	Michel Almeida	Portugal

==== 71 kg ====
Position	Judoka	Country
1.	Stefan Dott	Germany
2.	Josef Vensek	Czechoslovakia
3.	Christophe Gagliano	France
3.	Magomedbek Aliev	Soviet Union
5.	Billy Cusack	Great Britain
5.	Alparslan Ayan	Turkey
7.	Norbert Haimberger	Austria
7.	Laurent Pellet	Switzerland

==== 78 kg ====
Position	Judoka	Country
1.	Anthonie Wurth	Netherlands
2.	Johan Laats	Belgium
3.	Krzysztof Kamiński	Poland
3.	Bashir Varaev	Soviet Union
5.	Marko Spittka	Germany
5.	Alessandro Pilati	Italy
7.	Ryan Birch	Great Britain
7.	Bertrand Amoussou-Guenou	France

==== 86 kg ====
Position	Judoka	Country
1.	Axel Lobenstein	Germany
2.	Giorgio Vismara	Italy
3.	Adrian Croitoru	Romania
3.	León Villar	Spain
5.	Ben Spijkers	Netherlands
5.	Densign White	Great Britain
7.	Tagir Abdulaev	Soviet Union
7.	Kimmo Kallama	Finland

==== 95 kg ====
Position	Judoka	Country
1.	Theo Meijer	Netherlands
2.	Givi Gaurgashvili	Soviet Union
3.	Stéphane Traineau	France
3.	Detlef Knorrek	Germany
5.	Martin Lieb	Austria
5.	Anatoli Asenov	Bulgaria
7.	Pawel Nastula	Poland
7.	Jirí Sosna	Czechoslovakia

==== +95 kg ====
Position	Judoka	Country
1.	Henry Stoehr	Germany
2.	Sergey Kosorotov	Soviet Union
3.	Rafal Kubacki	Poland
3.	David Douillet	France
5.	Josef Schmoeller	Austria
5.	Marian Grozea	Romania
7.	Harry Van Barneveld	Belgium
7.	Stefano Venturelli	Italy

==== Open class ====
Position	Judoka	Country
1.	Igor Bereznitsky	Soviet Union
2.	Bernd Von Eitzen	Germany
3.	Patrice Rognon	France
3.	Stefano Venturelli	Italy
5.	Dmitar Milinkovic	Serbia
5.	Josef Schmoeller	Austria
7.	Marian Grozea	Romania
7.	Milan Rezac	Czechoslovakia

=== Women ===
==== 48 kg ====
Position	Judoka	Country
1.	Cécile Nowak	France
2.	Karen Briggs	Great Britain
3.	Yolanda Soler	Spain
3.	Giovanna Tortora	Italy
5.	Kerstin Emich	Germany
5.	Batia Frantzuzu	Israel
7.	Tatyana Kuvshinova	Soviet Union
7.	Leposava Markovic	Serbia

==== 52 kg ====
Position	Judoka	Country
1.	Jessica Gal	Netherlands
2.	Loretta Doyle	Great Britain
3.	Alessandra Giungi	Italy
3.	Fabienne Boffin	France
5.	Tatyana Gavrilova	Ukraine
5.	Jaana Ronkainen	Finland
7.	Heidi Goossens	Belgium
7.	Mariana Miklosi	Romania

==== 56 kg ====
Position	Judoka	Country
1.	Miriam Blasco	Spain
2.	Gooitske Marsman	Netherlands
3.	Cathérine Arnaud	France
3.	Gudrun Hausch	Germany
5.	Laura Zimbaro	Italy
5.	Tatyana Volobueva	Soviet Union
7.	Nicola Fairbrother	Great Britain
7.	Fides Kaspar	Switzerland

==== 61 kg ====
Position	Judoka	Country
1.	Zsuzsa Nagy	Hungary
2.	Frauke Eickhoff	Germany
3.	Yael Arad	Israel
3.	Susanne Profanter	Austria
5.	Gella Vandecaveye	Belgium
5.	Elena Petrova	Soviet Union
7.	Jenny Gal	Italy
7.	Nejla Kaya	Turkey

==== 66 kg ====
Position	Judoka	Country
1.	Isabelle Beauruelle	France
2.	Kate Howey	Great Britain
3.	Chantal Han	Netherlands
3.	Emanuela Pierantozzi	Italy
5.	Elena Kotelnikova	Soviet Union
5.	Iwona Stefaniuk	Poland
7.	Alexandra Schreiber	Germany
7.	Kirsten Harefallet	Norway

==== 72 kg ====
Position	Judoka	Country
1.	Laëtitia Meignan	France
2.	Elisabeth Karlsson	Sweden
3.	Ulla Werbrouck	Belgium
3.	Marion van Dorssen	Netherlands
5.	Jane Morris	Great Britain
5.	Gabina Zolova	Bulgaria
7.	Elena Besova	Soviet Union
7.	Maria Litwinowicz	Poland

==== +72 kg ====
Position	Judoka	Country
1.	Beáta Maksymow	Poland
2.	Claudia Weber	Germany
3.	Svetlana Gundarenko	Soviet Union
3.	Angelique Seriese	Netherlands
5.	Christine Cicot	France
5.	Sharon Lee	Great Britain
7.	Inmaculada Vicent	Spain
7.	Minodora Nemes	Romania

==== Open class ====
Position	Judoka	Country
1.	Monique van der Lee	Netherlands
2.	Renata Szal	Poland
3.	Karin Kutz	Germany
3.	Natalina Lupino	France
5.	Éva Granicz	Hungary
5.	Sharon Lee	Great Britain
7.	Martina Zangerl	Austria
7.	Isabel Cortavitarte	Spain
