= 1995 European Judo Championships =

1995 Judo European Judo Championships
- Location: Birmingham, England
- Dates: 11–14 May 1995

Competition at external databases
- Links: JudoInside

The 1995 European Judo Championships were the 6th edition of the European Judo Championships, and were held in Birmingham, England from 11 to 14 May 1995.

== Medal overview ==
=== Men ===
Event	Gold	Silver	Bronze
60 kg	(United Kingdom) Nigel Donohue	(Georgia (country)) Giorgi Vazagashvili	(Italy) Girolamo Giovinazzo (Belarus) Natik Bagirov
65 kg	(Germany) Peter Schlatter	(Latvia) Vsevolods Zeļonijs	(Belgium) Philip Laats (Turkey) Bektaş Demirel
71 kg	(Germany) Martin Schmidt	(France) Christophe Gagliano	(Bosnia and Herzegovina) Davor Vlaskovac (Austria) Thomas Schleicher
78 kg	(Austria) Patrick Reiter	(France) Djamel Bouras	(Belgium) Johan Laats (Turkey) Irfan Toker
86 kg	(Netherlands) Maarten Arens	(Georgia (country)) Iveri Jikurauli	(Ukraine) Ruslan Mashurenko (Russia) Oleg Maltsev
95 kg	(Poland) Paweł Nastula	(Russia) Dmitri Sergeyev	(France) Stéphane Traineau (Portugal) Pedro Soares
+95 kg	(Russia) Serguei Kossorotov	(Germany) Frank Möller	(Netherlands) Denny Ebbers (Poland) Rafał Kubacki
Open class	(Hungary) Imre Csösz	(Germany) Ralf Koser	(Belgium) Harry Van Barneveld (Netherlands) Ben Sonnemans

=== Women ===
Event	Gold	Silver	Bronze
48 kg	(Spain) Yolanda Soler	(France) Sylvie Meloux	(United Kingdom) Joyce Heron (Russia) Tatiana Kouvchinova
52 kg	(Italy) Alessandra Giungi	(Belgium) Heidi Goossens	(Poland) Ewa Larysa Krause (United Kingdom) Sharon Rendle
56 kg	(United Kingdom) Nicola Fairbrother	(Spain) Isabel Fernández	(Netherlands) Jessica Gal (Israel) Einat Yaron
61 kg	(Netherlands) Jenny Gal	(United Kingdom) Diane Bell	(Belgium) Gella Vandecaveye (France) Cathérine Fleury-Vachon
66 kg	(France) Alice Dubois	(Italy) Emanuela Pierantozzi	(Germany) Ute Burmeister (United Kingdom) Rowena Sweatman
72 kg	(Belgium) Ulla Werbrouck	(France) Estha Essombe	(United Kingdom) Kate Howey (Austria) Doris Pöllhuber
+72 kg	(Russia) Svetlana Goundarenko	(France) Christine Cicot	(Poland) Beata Maksymow (Netherlands) Monique van der Lee
Open class	(Netherlands) Angelique Seriese	(Romania) Simona Richter	(Bulgaria) Tsvetana Bozhilova (Spain) Raquel Barrientos

=== Medal table ===
Rank	Nation	Gold	Silver	Bronze	Total
1	Netherlands	3	0	4	7
2	Germany	2	2	1	5
3	Great Britain	2	1	4	7
4	Russia	2	1	2	5
5	France	1	5	2	8
6	Belgium	1	1	4	6
7	Italy	1	1	1	3
7	Spain	1	1	1	3
9	Poland	1	0	3	4
10	Austria	1	0	2	3
11	Hungary	1	0	0	1
12	Georgia	0	2	0	2
13	Latvia	0	1	0	1
13	Romania	0	1	0	1
15	Turkey	0	0	2	2
16	Belarus	0	0	1	1
16	Bosnia and Herzegovina	0	0	1	1
16	Bulgaria	0	0	1	1
16	Israel	0	0	1	1
16	Portugal	0	0	1	1
16	Ukraine	0	0	1	1
Totals (21 entries)		16	16	32	64

== Results overview ==
=== Men ===
==== 60 kg ====
Position	Judoka	Country
1.	Nigel Donohue	Great Britain
2.	Giorgi Vazagashvili	Georgia
3.	Girolamo Giovinazzo	Italy
3.	Natik Bagirov	Belarus
5.	Yacine Douma	France
5.	Amit Lang	Israel
7.	Orlin Russev	Bulgaria
7.	Lajos Kobleher	FR Yugoslavia

==== 65 kg ====
Position	Judoka	Country
1.	Peter Schlatter	Germany
2.	Vsevolods Zeļonijs	Latvia
3.	Philip Laats	Belgium
3.	Bektaş Demirel	Turkey
5.	José Tomás Toro	Spain
5.	Vladimir Dratchko	Russia
7.	Pasi Lauren	Finland
7.	Christophe Brunet	France

==== 71 kg ====
Position	Judoka	Country
1.	Martin Schmidt	Germany
2.	Christophe Gagliano	France
3.	Davor Vlaskovac	Bosnia and Herzegovina
3.	Thomas Schleicher	Austria
5.	Andrei Golban	Moldova
5.	Laurent Pellet	Switzerland
7.	Patrick van Loon	Netherlands
7.	Danny Kingston	Great Britain

==== 78 kg ====
Position	Judoka	Country
1.	Patrick Reiter	Austria
2.	Djamel Bouras	France
3.	Johan Laats	Belgium
3.	Irfan Toker	Turkey
5.	Mark Huizinga	Netherlands
5.	Ryan Birch	Great Britain
7.	Uwe Frenz	Germany
7.	Shay-Oren Smadja	Israel

==== 86 kg ====
Position	Judoka	Country
1.	Maarten Arens	Netherlands
2.	Iveri Jikurauli	Georgia
3.	Ruslan Mashurenko	Ukraine
3.	Oleg Maltsev	Russia
5.	Vincenzo Carabetta	France
5.	Fernando González	Spain
7.	Filipan Hrvoje	Croatia
7.	Algimantas Merkevičius	Lithuania

==== 95 kg ====
Position	Judoka	Country
1.	Paweł Nastula	Poland
2.	Dmitri Sergeyev	Russia
3.	Stéphane Traineau	France
3.	Pedro Soares	Portugal
5.	Antal Kovács	Hungary
5.	Raymond Stevens	Great Britain
7.	Ljubomir Živić	FR Yugoslavia
7.	Petr Jákl	Czech Republic

==== +95 kg ====
Position	Judoka	Country
1.	Serguei Kossorotov	Russia
2.	Frank Möller	Germany
3.	Denny Ebbers	Netherlands
3.	Rafał Kubacki	Poland
5.	Indrek Pertelson	Estonia
5.	Imre Csösz	Hungary
7.	Alexander Davitashvili	Georgia
7.	Igor Mueller	Luxembourg

==== Open class ====
Position	Judoka	Country
1.	Imre Csösz	Hungary
2.	Ralf Koser	Germany
3.	Harry Van Barneveld	Belgium
3.	Ben Sonnemans	Netherlands
5.	Ernesto Pérez	Spain
5.	Laurent Crost	France
7.	Igor Mueller	Luxembourg
7.	Evgeni Pechurov	Russia

=== Women ===
==== 48 kg ====
Position	Judoka	Country
1.	Yolanda Soler	Spain
2.	Sylvie Meloux	France
3.	Joyce Heron	Great Britain
3.	Tatiana Kouvchinova	Russia
5.	Giovanna Tortora	Italy
5.	Galina Tomiak	Ukraine
7.	Tamara Meijer	Netherlands
7.	Jana Perlberg	Germany

==== 52 kg ====
Position	Judoka	Country
1.	Alessandra Giungi	Italy
2.	Heidi Goossens	Belgium
3.	Ewa Larysa Krause	Poland
3.	Sharon Rendle	Great Britain
5.	Laëtitia Tignola	France
5.	Almudena Muñoz	Spain
7.	Marina Kovriguina	Russia
7.	Barbara Till	Hungary

==== 56 kg ====
Position	Judoka	Country
1.	Nicola Fairbrother	Great Britain
2.	Isabel Fernández	Spain
3.	Jessica Gal	Netherlands
3.	Einat Yaron	Israel
5.	Karine Petit	France
5.	Tanja Münzinger	Germany
7.	Inge Clement	Belgium
7.	Mária Pékli	Hungary

==== 61 kg ====
Position	Judoka	Country
1.	Jenny Gal	Netherlands
2.	Diane Bell	Great Britain
3.	Gella Vandecaveye	Belgium
3.	Cathérine Fleury-Vachon	France
5.	Michaela Vernerová	Czech Republic
5.	Elina Novgorodtseva	Russia
7.	Elna Schminke	Germany
7.	Gisela Hämmerling	Switzerland

==== 66 kg ====
Position	Judoka	Country
1.	Alice Dubois	France
2.	Emanuela Pierantozzi	Italy
3.	Ute Burmeister	Germany
3.	Rowena Sweatman	Great Britain
5.	Galina Ivanova	Bulgaria
5.	Catarina Rodrigues	Portugal
7.	Agata Mróz	Poland
7.	Mariela Spacek	Austria

==== 72 kg ====
Position	Judoka	Country
1.	Ulla Werbrouck	Belgium
2.	Estha Essombe	France
3.	Kate Howey	Great Britain
3.	Doris Pöllhuber	Austria
5.	Danojla Djurdjevac	FR Yugoslavia
5.	Simona Richter	Romania
7.	Ylenia Scapin	Italy
7.	Beata Walczak	Poland

==== +72 kg ====
Position	Judoka	Country
1.	Svetlana Goundarenko	Russia
2.	Christine Cicot	France
3.	Beata Maksymow	Poland
3.	Monique van der Lee	Netherlands
5.	Johanna Hagn	Germany
5.	Josephine Horton	Great Britain
7.	Donata Burgatta	Italy
7.	Tsvetana Bozhilova	Bulgaria

==== Open class ====
Position	Judoka	Country
1.	Angelique Seriese	Netherlands
2.	Simona Richter	Romania
3.	Tsvetana Bozhilova	Bulgaria
3.	Raquel Barrientos	Spain
5.	Éva Granicz	Hungary
5.	Sandra Köppen	Germany
7.	Marta Kołodziejczyk	Poland
7.	Donata Burgatta	Italy
