= 1992 European Judo Championships =

Sports tournament

1992 Judo European Judo Championships
- Location: Paris, France
- Dates: 4–7 May 1992

Competition at external databases
- Links: JudoInside

The 1992 European Judo Championships were held in Paris, France from 4 to 7 May 1992.

== Medal overview ==
=== Men ===
Event	Gold	Silver	Bronze
60 kg	(Commonwealth of Independent States) Nazim Huseynov	(France) Philip Pradayrol	(Republic of Ireland) Keith Gough (Germany) Raik Arnold
65 kg	(France) Benoît Campargue	(Latvia) Vsevolods Zelonijs	(Bulgaria) Ivan Netov (Spain) Francisco Lorenzo
71 kg	(Austria) Norbert Haimberger	(France) Bruno Carabetta	(Israel) Oren Smadja (Spain) Joaquín Ruíz
78 kg	(Germany) Marko Spittka	(Switzerland) Olivier Schaffter	(France) Bertrand Damaisin (Commonwealth of Independent States) Sharip Varaev
86 kg	(France) Pascal Tayot	(Romania) Adrian Croitoru	(Italy) Giorgio Vismara (Spain) León Villar
95 kg	(France) Stéphane Traineau	(Commonwealth of Independent States) Dmitry Sergeev	(Italy) Luigi Guido (Hungary) Antal Kovács
95+ kg	(Germany) Frank Möller	(Commonwealth of Independent States) Sergey Kosorotov	(France) David Douillet (Netherlands) Dennis Raven
Open class	(Germany) Thomas Müller	(France) Georges Mathonnet	(Belgium) Harry Van Barneveld (United Kingdom) Elvis Gordon

=== Women ===
Event	Gold	Silver	Bronze
48 kg	(France) Cécile Nowak	(Spain) Yolanda Soler	(Finland) Annikka Mutanen (Italy) Giovanna Tortora
52 kg	(United Kingdom) Loretta Doyle	(Netherlands) Jessica Gal	(Belgium) Heidi Goossens (Italy) Alessandra Giungi
56 kg	(United Kingdom) Nicola Fairbrother	(Belgium) Nicole Flagothier	(France) Cathérine Arnaud (Spain) Miriam Blasco
61 kg	(Poland) Boguslawa Olechnowicz	(Germany) Frauke Eickhoff	(Commonwealth of Independent States) Yelena Petrova (Spain) Begoña Gómez
66 kg	(Italy) Emanuela Pierantozzi	(Belgium) Heidi Rakels	(Commonwealth of Independent States) Elena Kotelnikova (Germany) Alexandra Schreiber
72 kg	(France) Laëtitia Meignan	(Belgium) Ulla Werbrouck	(Netherlands) Irene de Kok (Germany) Karin Krüger
72+ kg	(Commonwealth of Independent States) Svetlana Gundarenko	(Germany) Claudia Weber	(Netherlands) Monique van der Lee (Poland) Renata Szal
Open class	(Netherlands) Angelique Seriese	(Romania) Simona Richter	(Germany) Karin Kutz (France) Natalina Lupino

=== Medal table ===
* Host nation (France)

Rank	Nation	Gold	Silver	Bronze	Total
1	France*	5	3	4	12
2	Germany	3	2	4	9
3	CIS	2	2	3	7
4	Great Britain	2	0	1	3
5	Netherlands	1	1	3	5
6	Italy	1	0	4	5
7	Poland	1	0	1	2
8	Austria	1	0	0	1
9	Belgium	0	3	2	5
10	Romania	0	2	0	2
11	Spain	0	1	5	6
12	Latvia	0	1	0	1
12	Switzerland	0	1	0	1
14	Bulgaria	0	0	1	1
14	Finland	0	0	1	1
14	Hungary	0	0	1	1
14	Ireland	0	0	1	1
14	Israel	0	0	1	1
Totals (18 entries)		16	16	32	64
