= 1989 European Judo Championships =

1989 Judo European Judo Championships
- Venue: Helsinki Ice Hall
- Location: Helsinki, Finland
- Dates: 11–14 May 1989

Competition at external databases
- Links: JudoInside

The 1989 European Judo Championships were held in Helsinki, Finland from 11 to 14 May 1989.

== Results ==
=== Men ===
==== 60 kg ====
Position	Judoka	Country
1.	Amiran Totikashvili	Soviet Union
2.	Peter Sedivak	Czechoslovakia
3.	Philip Pradayrol	France
3.	Carlos Sotillo	Spain
5.	Shuki Koaz	Israel
5.	József Wagner	Hungary
7.	Pavel Botev	Bulgaria
7.	Zbigniew Szaforz	Poland

==== 65 kg ====
Position	Judoka	Country
1.	Bruno Carabetta	France
2.	Sergey Kosmynin	Soviet Union
3.	József Csák	Hungary
3.	Pavel Petrikov	Czechoslovakia
5.	Allan Fevre	Denmark
5.	Fredrik Norén	Sweden
7.	Mark Preston	Great Britain
7.	Dragomir Bečanović	Yugoslavia

==== 71 kg ====
Position	Judoka	Country
1.	Jorma Korhonen	Finland
2.	Bertalan Hajtós	Hungary
3.	Marc Alexandre	France
3.	Georgy Tenadze	Soviet Union
5.	Alparslan Ayan	Turkey
5.	Joaquín Ruíz	Spain
7.	Miroslav Jocic	Yugoslavia
7.	Stefaan Laats	Belgium

==== 78 kg ====
Position	Judoka	Country
1.	Bashir Varaev	Soviet Union
2.	Frank Wieneke	West Germany
3.	Anthonie Wurth	Netherlands
3.	Zsolt Zsoldos	Hungary
5.	Jean-Michel Berthet	France
5.	Jukka-Pekka Metsola	Finland
7.	Olivier Schaffter	Switzerland
7.	Lars Adolfsson	Sweden

==== 86 kg ====
Position	Judoka	Country
1.	Fabien Canu	France
2.	Vitaly Budyukin	Soviet Union
3.	Axel Lobenstein	East Germany
3.	Giorgio Vismara	Italy
5.	Luc Suplis	Belgium
5.	Densign White	Great Britain
7.	Petru Anitoaie	Romania
7.	Daniel Kistler	Switzerland

==== 95 kg ====
Position	Judoka	Country
1.	Koba Kurtanidze	Soviet Union
2.	Jirí Sosna	Czechoslovakia
3.	Marc Meiling	West Germany
3.	Theo Meijer	Netherlands
5.	Marko Valev	Bulgaria
5.	Jens Geisler	East Germany
7.	Jacek Beutler	Poland
7.	Pasi Lind	Finland

==== 95+ kg ====
Position	Judoka	Country
1.	Rafal Kubacki	Poland
2.	Thomas Mueller	East Germany
3.	Hans Buiting	Netherlands
3.	Grigory Verichev	Soviet Union
5.	Josef Schmoeller	Austria
5.	Alexander Von der Groeben	West Germany
7.	Harry Van Barneveld	Belgium
7.	Damyan Stoikov	Bulgaria

==== Open class ====
Position	Judoka	Country
1.	Juha Salonen	Finland
2.	Frank Moeller	East Germany
3.	Sergey Kosorotov	Soviet Union
3.	Harry Van Barneveld	Belgium
5.	Bjarni Fridriksson	Iceland
5.	Roger Vachon	France
7.	László Tolnai	Hungary
7.	Damyan Stoikov	Bulgaria

=== Women ===
==== 48 kg ====
Position	Judoka	Country
1.	Cécile Nowak	France
2.	Karen Briggs	Great Britain
3.	Malgorzata Roszkowska	Poland
3.	Marjo Vilhola	Finland
5.	Michaela Bornemann	Austria
5.	Giovanna Tortora	Italy
7.	Kerstin Emich	West Germany
7.	Funda Cansevdi	Turkey

==== 52 kg ====
Position	Judoka	Country
1.	Jaana Ronkainen	Finland
2.	Dominique Maaoui-Brun	France
3.	Joanna Majdan	Poland
3.	Sharon Rendle	Great Britain
5.	Alessandra Giungi	Italy
5.	Carmen Schuler	West Germany
7.	Katalin Parragh	Hungary
7.	Ruth Magen	Israel

==== 56 kg ====
Position	Judoka	Country
1.	Cathérine Arnaud	France
2.	Maria Gontowicz-Szalas	Poland
3.	Miriam Blasco	Spain
3.	Jenny Gal	Netherlands
5.	Domenica Soraci	Italy
5.	Jaana Utriainen	Finland
7.	Nicole Flagothier	Belgium
7.	Miroslava Janosikova	Czechoslovakia

==== 61 kg ====
Position	Judoka	Country
1.	Cathérine Fleury-Vachon	France
2.	Lenka Šindlerová	Czechoslovakia
3.	Diane Bell	Great Britain
3.	Yael Arad	Israel
5.	Marjolein van Dommelen	Netherlands
5.	Monica Barbieri	Italy
7.	Gabi Ritschel	West Germany
7.	Olivia Jesus	Portugal

==== 66 kg ====
Position	Judoka	Country
1.	Emanuela Pierantozzi	Italy
2.	Alexandra Schreiber	West Germany
3.	Claire Lecat	France
3.	Ulla Werbrouck	Belgium
5.	Chantal Han	Netherlands
5.	Roswitha Hartl	Austria
7.	Viktoria Gordeeva	Soviet Union
7.	Jane Morris	Great Britain

==== 72 kg ====
Position	Judoka	Country
1.	Ingrid Berghmans	Belgium
2.	Elisabeth Karlsson	Sweden
3.	Aline Batailler	France
3.	Marion van Dorssen	Netherlands
5.	Erica Baroncini	Italy
5.	Isabel Cortavitarte	Spain
7.	Stefania Drzewicka	Poland
7.	Heli Syrja	Finland

==== 72+ kg ====
Position	Judoka	Country
1.	Angelique Seriese	Netherlands
2.	Anne Akerblom	Finland
3.	Natalina Lupino	France
3.	Beáta Maksymow	Poland
5.	Maria Teresa Motta	Italy
5.	Claudia Weber	West Germany
7.	Tsvetana Bozhilova	Bulgaria
7.	Angela Medina	Spain

==== Open class ====
Position	Judoka	Country
1.	Angelique Seriese	Netherlands
2.	Beáta Maksymow	Poland
3.	Ingrid Berghmans	Belgium
3.	Elena Guschina	Soviet Union
5.	Katarina Håkanson	Sweden
5.	Manuela Tondolo	Italy
7.	Christine Cicot	France
7.	Tsvetana Bozhilova	Bulgaria
