= 1993 European Judo Championships =

1993 Judo European Judo Championships
- Location: Athens, Greece
- Dates: 1–2 May 1993

Competition at external databases
- Links: JudoInside

The 1993 European Judo Championships were the 4th edition of the European Judo Championships, and were held in Athens, Greece from 1 to 2 May 1993.

== Medal overview ==
=== Men ===
Event	Gold	Silver	Bronze
60 kg	(Azerbaijan) Nazim Huseynov	(Russia) Huseyn Bisultanov	(Bulgaria) Pavel Botev (United Kingdom) Nigel Donohue
65 kg	(Russia) Sergey Kosmynin	(Latvia) Vsevolods Zelonijs	(Germany) Udo Quellmalz (Moldova) Fedor Lazarenko
71 kg	(Georgia (country)) Vladimir Dgebuadze	(Azerbaijan) Tarlan Poladov	(Finland) Jorma Korhonen (France) Patrick Rosso
78 kg	(France) Darcel Yandzi	(Georgia (country)) Soso Liparteliani	(Belgium) Johan Laats (Russia) Alexey Timoshkin
86 kg	(France) Pascal Tayot	(Moldova) Apti Magomadov	(Netherlands) Alex Smeets (Russia) Oleg Maltsev
95 kg	(France) Stéphane Traineau	(Austria) Thomas Etlinger	(Belarus) Leonid Svirid (Hungary) Antal Kovács
+95 kg	(Georgia (country)) David Khakhaleishvili	(France) David Douillet	(Germany) Frank Möller (Poland) Rafal Kubacki
Open class	(Georgia (country)) David Khakhaleishvili	(Belgium) Harry Van Barneveld	(Russia) Evgeny Pechurov (Germany) Henry Stoehr

=== Women ===
Event	Gold	Silver	Bronze
48 kg	(Germany) Jana Perlberg	(Russia) Tatyana Kuvshinova	(France) Martine Dupond (Turkey) Hulya Senyurt
52 kg	(Spain) Almudena Muñoz	(France) Cécile Nowak	(United Kingdom) Elise Summers (Italy) Alessandra Giungi
56 kg	(United Kingdom) Nicola Fairbrother	(Germany) Tanja Muenzinger	(Belgium) Nicole Flagothier (Poland) Anita Kubica
61 kg	(Israel) Yael Arad	(Belgium) Gella Vandecaveye	(United Kingdom) Diane Bell (France) Cathérine Fleury-Vachon
66 kg	(France) Alice Dubois	(United Kingdom) Chloe Cowen	(Netherlands) Claudia Zwiers (Italy) Emanuela Pierantozzi
72 kg	(France) Laëtitia Meignan	(Belgium) Ulla Werbrouck	(Netherlands) Karin Kienhuis (United Kingdom) Kate Howey
+72 kg	(Netherlands) Monique van der Lee	(Russia) Svetlana Gundarenko	(Poland) Beáta Maksymow (France) Natalina Lupino
Open class	(Netherlands) Angelique Seriese	(France) Natalina Lupino	(Russia) Irina Rodina (Germany) Karin Kutz

=== Medal table ===
Rank	Nation	Gold	Silver	Bronze	Total
1	France	5	3	4	12
2	Georgia	3	1	0	4
3	Netherlands	2	0	3	5
4	Russia	1	2	4	7
5	Germany	1	1	4	6
5	Great Britain	1	1	4	6
7	Azerbaijan	1	1	0	2
8	Israel	1	0	0	1
8	Spain	1	0	0	1
10	Belgium	0	3	2	5
11	Austria	0	1	0	1
11	Latvia	0	1	0	1
11	Moldova	0	1	0	1
14	Poland	0	0	3	3
15	Italy	0	0	2	2
16	Belarus	0	0	1	1
16	Bulgaria	0	0	1	1
16	Finland	0	0	1	1
16	Hungary	0	0	1	1
16	Turkey	0	0	1	1
Totals (20 entries)		16	15	31	62

== Results overview ==
=== Men ===
==== 60 kg ====
Position	Judoka	Country
1.	Nazim Huseynov	Azerbaijan
2.	Huseyin Ozkan	Turkey
3.	Pavel Botev	Bulgaria
3.	Nigel Donohue	Great Britain
5.	Roberto Naveira	Spain
5.	Richard Trautmann	Germany
7.	Roman Novacek	Czech Republic
7.	Kakha Gough	Georgia

==== 65 kg ====
Position	Judoka	Country
1.	Sergey Kosmynin	Russia
2.	Vsevolods Zelonijs	Latvia
3.	Udo Quellmalz	Germany
3.	Fedor Lazarenko	Moldova
5.	Nasser Nechar	France
5.	Jean-Paul Bell	Great Britain
7.	Philip Laats	Belgium
7.	Tommy Mortensen	Denmark

==== 71 kg ====
Position	Judoka	Country
1.	Vladimir Dgebuadze	Georgia
2.	Tarlan Poladov	Azerbaijan
3.	Jorma Korhonen	Finland
3.	Patrick Rosso	France
5.	Diego Brambilla	Italy
5.	Alparslan Ayan	Turkey
7.	Josef Vensek	Czech Republic
7.	Laurent Pellet	Switzerland

==== 78 kg ====
Position	Judoka	Country
1.	Darcel Yandzi	France
2.	Soso Liparteliani	Georgia
3.	Johan Laats	Belgium
3.	Alexey Timoshkin	Russia
5.	Louis Wijdenbosch	Netherlands
5.	Petr Babjak	Czech Republic
7.	Dean Wohlfahrt	Croatia
7.	Ákos Kadas	Hungary

==== 86 kg ====
Position	Judoka	Country
1.	Pascal Tayot	France
2.	Apti Magomadov	Moldova
3.	Alex Smeets	Netherlands
3.	Oleg Maltsev	Russia
5.	Adrian Croitoru	Romania
5.	Algimantas Merkevicius	Lithuania
7.	Dave Southby	Great Britain
7.	León Villar	Spain

==== 95 kg ====
Position	Judoka	Country
1.	Stéphane Traineau	France
2.	Thomas Etlinger	Austria
3.	Leonid Svirid	Belarus
3.	Antal Kovács	Hungary
5.	Luigi Guido	Italy
5.	Vadim Voinov	Latvia
7.	Detlef Knorrek	Germany
7.	Gabriel Munteanu	Romania

==== +95 kg ====
Position	Judoka	Country
1.	David Khakhaleishvili	Georgia
2.	David Douillet	France
3.	Frank Möller	Germany
3.	Rafal Kubacki	Poland
5.	Igor Mueller	Luxembourg
5.	Ruslan Sharapov	Belarus
7.	Harry Van Barneveld	Belgium
7.	Sergey Kosorotov	Russia

==== Open class ====
Position	Judoka	Country
1.	David Khakhaleishvili	Georgia
2.	Harry Van Barneveld	Belgium
3.	Evgeny Pechurov	Russia
3.	Henry Stoehr	Germany
5.	Jérôme Dreyfus	France
5.	Indrek Pertelson	Estonia
7.	Rafal Kubacki	Poland
7.	Dano Pantic	Yugoslavia

=== Women ===
==== 48 kg ====
Position	Judoka	Country
1.	Jana Perlberg	Germany
2.	Tatyana Kuvshinova	Russia
3.	Martine Dupond	France
3.	Hulya Senyurt	Turkey
5.	Evangelista Vassiliou	Greece
5.	Gulshan Shirinova	Azerbaijan
7.	Galina Tomyak	Ukraine
7.	Justina Sousa	Portugal

==== 52 kg ====
Position	Judoka	Country
1.	Almudena Muñoz	Spain
2.	Cécile Nowak	France
3.	Elise Summers	Great Britain
3.	Alessandra Giungi	Italy
5.	Heidi Goossens	Belgium
5.	Isabelle Schmutz	Switzerland
7.	Alexa Von Schwichow	Germany
7.	Ewa-larysa Krause	Poland

==== 56 kg ====
Position	Judoka	Country
1.	Nicola Fairbrother	Great Britain
2.	Tanja Muenzinger	Germany
3.	Nicole Flagothier	Belgium
3.	Anita Kubica	Poland
5.	Zulfiya Huseynova	Azerbaijan
5.	Filipa Cavalleri	Portugal
7.	Michelle Krey	Denmark
7.	Sonia Tognoloni	Italy

==== 61 kg ====
Position	Judoka	Country
1.	Yael Arad	Israel
2.	Gella Vandecaveye	Belgium
3.	Diane Bell	Great Britain
3.	Cathérine Fleury-Vachon	France
5.	Miriam Blasco	Spain
5.	Gisela Haemmerling	Switzerland
7.	Jenny Gal	Netherlands
7.	Barbara Muzzioli	Italy

==== 66 kg ====
Position	Judoka	Country
1.	Alice Dubois	France
2.	Chloe Cowen	Great Britain
3.	Claudia Zwiers	Netherlands
3.	Emanuela Pierantozzi	Italy
5.	Elena Kotelnikova	Russia
5.	Catarina Rodrigues	Portugal
7.	Radka Stusakova	Czech Republic
7.	Katarzyna Juszczak	Poland

==== 72 kg ====
Position	Judoka	Country
1.	Laëtitia Meignan	France
2.	Ulla Werbrouck	Belgium
3.	Karin Kienhuis	Netherlands
3.	Kate Howey	Great Britain
5.	Christine Meierarend	Germany
5.	Simona Richter	Romania
7.	Alexia Kourtelesi	Greece
7.	Natalia Slivaeva	Ukraine

==== +72 kg ====
Position	Judoka	Country
1.	Monique Van der Lee	Netherlands
2.	Svetlana Gundarenko	Russia
3.	Beáta Maksymow	Poland
3.	Natalina Lupino	France
5.	Donata Burgatta	Italy
5.	Anne Akerblom	Finland
7.	Johanna Hagn	Germany
7.	Svetlana Lysyanskaya	Ukraine

==== Open class ====
Position	Judoka	Country
1.	Angelique Seriese	Netherlands
2.	Natalina Lupino	France
3.	Irina Rodina	Russia
3.	Karin Kutz	Germany
5.	Beáta Maksymow	Poland
5.	Irina Emelyanova	Russia
7.	Donata Burgatta	Italy
7.	Raquel Barrientos	Spain
