= 1988 European Judo Championships =

1988 Judo European Judo Championships
- Location: Pamplona, Spain
- Dates: 19–22 May 1988

Competition at external databases
- Links: JudoInside

The 1988 European Judo Championships were the eighteenth edition of the European Judo Championships, held in Pamplona, Spain, from May 19 to May 22, 1988.

== Medal overview ==
=== Men ===
Event	Gold	Silver	Bronze
−60 kg	(Soviet Union) Amiran Totikashvili	(France) Patrick Roux	(United Kingdom) Neil Eckersley (Spain) Carlos Sotillo
−65 kg	(France) Bruno Carabetta	(West Germany) Guido Schumacher	(East Germany) Udo Quellmalz (Soviet Union) Sergey Kosmynin
−71 kg	(Spain) Joaquín Ruíz	(East Germany) Sven Loll	(West Germany) Hans Engelmeier (Poland) Krzysztof Kamiński
−78 kg	(Soviet Union) Bashir Varaev	(West Germany) Frank Wieneke	(France) Pascal Tayot (Austria) Peter Reiter
−86 kg	(France) Fabien Canu	(United Kingdom) Densign White	(Austria) Peter Seisenbacher (Netherlands) Ben Spijkers
−95 kg	(Czechoslovakia) Jirí Sosna	(Soviet Union) Evgeny Pechurov	(Bulgaria) Marko Valev (Belgium) Robert Van de Walle
+95 kg	(Soviet Union) Grigory Verichev	(West Germany) Alexander von der Groeben	(East Germany) Henry Stoehr (Bulgaria) Dimitar Zapryanov
Open	(United Kingdom) Elvis Gordon	(Soviet Union) Akaki Kibordzalidze	(Bulgaria) Damyan Stoikov (Hungary) László Tolnai

=== Women ===
Event	Gold	Silver	Bronze
−48 kg	(Netherlands) Jessica Gal	(Hungary) Katalin Parragh	(France) Martine Dupond (Spain) Dolores Veguillas
−52 kg	(Italy) Alessandra Giungi	(Finland) Jaana Ronkainen	(Poland) Joanna Majdan (France) Dominique Maaoui-Brun
−56 kg	(France) Cathérine Arnaud	(Spain) Miriam Blasco	(Netherlands) Jenny Gal (Switzerland) Gisela Haemmerling
−61 kg	(United Kingdom) Diane Bell	(Spain) Begoña Gómez	(West Germany) Frauke Eickhoff (Austria) Renate Lehner
−66 kg	(West Germany) Alexandra Schreiber	(Italy) Emanuela Pierantozzi	(France) Brigitte Deydier (Austria) Roswitha Hartl
−72 kg	(Belgium) Ingrid Berghmans	(Spain) Isabel Cortavitarte	(Sweden) Elisabeth Karlsson (France) Laëtitia Meignan
+72 kg	(Netherlands) Angelique Seriese	(France) Isabelle Paque	(West Germany) Karin Kutz (United Kingdom) Sharon Lee
Open	(Belgium) Ingrid Berghmans	(France) Emmanuelle Mikula	(Bulgaria) Tsvetana Bozhilova (Poland) Beata Maksymow

=== Medal table ===
Rank	Nation	Gold	Silver	Bronze	Total
1	France (FRA)	3	3	5	11
2	Soviet Union (URS)	3	2	1	6
3	Great Britain (GBR)	2	1	2	5
4	Netherlands (NED)	2	0	2	4
5	Belgium (BEL)	2	0	1	3
6	West Germany (FRG)	1	3	3	7
7	Spain (ESP)	1	3	2	6
8	Italy (ITA)	1	1	0	2
9	Czechoslovakia (TCH)	1	0	0	1
10	East Germany (GDR)	0	1	2	3
11	Hungary (HUN)	0	1	1	2
12	Finland (FIN)	0	1	0	1
13	Austria (AUT)	0	0	4	4
13	Bulgaria (BUL)	0	0	4	4
15	Poland (POL)	0	0	3	3
16	Sweden (SWE)	0	0	1	1
16	Switzerland (SUI)	0	0	1	1
Totals (17 entries)		16	16	32	64
