= Svetlana Goundarenko =

Russian Judoka and MMA fighter

Personal information
- Born: June 23, 1969 (age 57) Chelyabinsk, Soviet Union
- Occupations: Judoka; Mixed martial artist
- Martial arts career
- Height: 6 ft 3 in (191 cm)
- Weight: 330 lb (150 kg; 24 st)
- Division: Heavyweight

Mixed martial arts record
- Total: 8
- Wins: 6
- By submission: 5
- By decision: 1
- Losses: 2
- By submission: 1
- By decision: 1

Other information
- Mixed martial arts record from Sherdog

Sport
- Country: Russia
- Sport: Judo
- Weight class: +72 kg
- Rank: Black belt

Achievements and titles
- Olympic Games: 5th (1996)
- World Champ.: (bronze) (1993)
- European Champ.: (gold) (1992, 1995)
Medal record
Women's judo
Representing Russia
World Championships
Bronze medal – third place	1993 Hamilton	+72 kg
European Championships
Gold medal – first place	1992 Paris	+72 kg
Gold medal – first place	1995 Birmingham	+72 kg
Silver medal – second place	1993 Athens	+72 kg
Bronze medal – third place	1991 Prague	+72 kg
Bronze medal – third place	1994 Gdansk	+72 kg
Bronze medal – third place	1996 The Hague	+72 kg

Profile at external databases
- IJF: 53398
- JudoInside.com: 569
- Updated on 9 May 2024

Svetlana Aronovna Goundarenko (born June 23, 1969) is a Russian judoka, professional wrestler and mixed martial artist, known by her career in Japan. A pioneer of women's mixed martial arts, she has been considered by pundits as one of its earliest top fighters.

== Judo career ==
She competed at the 1989 World Judo Championships in +72 kg, ending up at the fifth position. In 1992, she won the European Championships, but her tenure in the 1992 Summer Olympics was less fortunate, losing by ouchi gari to Nathalie Lupino in quarter-finals and to Beata Maksymow by koka in the reserve match, thus ending at seventh place. Next year she ended third in the World Championships, but she came back by winning the Russian championship in 1994. 1995 seemed to be a similarly successful year, as Goundarenko won the European Championships again, but was fifth in the World Championships. She retired in 1999, when she married, opened a pub and became a judo coach and a plus-size model.

== Professional wrestling career ==
=== Frontier Martial-Arts Wrestling (1991–1992) ===
In 1991, Goundarenko entered the world of joshi puroresu for Japanese professional wrestling company Frontier Martial Arts Wrestling. Introduced as a monster heel character, she had her debut on September 13, defeating Keiko Iwami and Rie Nakamura in a handicap match, and kept winning matches through the month in both singles and handicap matches. Goundarenko also had an appearance FMW 2nd Anniversary Show on September 23, defeating native star Megumi Kudo by armbar in a "Different Style Fight". After a brief alliance with Kudo against Eriko Tsuchiya and Combat Toyoda, Goundarenko formed a tag team with Chris Cruise Christopher, continuing her winning streak into December. She had her final match for FMW on May 24, 1992, the streak finally broken by Toyoda.

== Mixed martial arts career ==
=== Ladies Legend Pro Wrestling (1995–1998) ===
Goundarenko had her MMA debut in 1995 for another Japanese joshi promotion, Ladies Legends Pro Wrestling, which had also diversified into MMA. In the first round, she defeated muay thai exponent Michele Aboro in 54 seconds, cornering her against the cage wall and throwing her down with te-waza before submitting her with a neck crank from kesa-gatame position. Goundarenko advanced round against LLPW pro wrestling star and former Kyokushin karateka Yumiko Hotta. The Japanese attempted to remain mobile while kicking at Goundarenko, but the judoka knocked her down repeatedly with heavy punches, eventually mounting her and locking another neck crank for the win.

At the third and final round, Goundarenko went against fellow world judo medalist Shinobu Kandori, who took off her judogi to reduce Svetlana's advantage. Still, Goundarenko managed to corner her against the fence, and although Kandori was able to slip out of the first koshi guruma, the Russian repeated and pinned her with kesa-gatame. She then applied a third neck crank, making Kandori tap out and winning the tournament.

Goundarenko returned to LLPW on October 10, 1995 for a rematch against Shinobu Kandori. The judoka threw Shinobu with ura nage and tried to smother her from the back, but the pro wrestler escaped. Then, blocking a hip throw and a kata guruma attempt, Kandori took her back and closed a guillotine choke, forcing Goundarenko into submission for the win. This fight is widely believed to be a work.

She returned as part of its special tournament L-1 on July 18, 1998, the first ever female mixed martial arts tournament in story. Having an ample size advantage over all the other participants, Svetlana was considered a favourite to win.

=== ReMix World Cup 2000 ===
On December 5, 2000, Goundarenko participated in another tournament, ReMix World Cup. Now fighting without her gi, Goundarenko faced her first opponent, professional wrestler Kyoko Inoue. The judoka dominated the stand-up with judo throws and reversals, while Inoue attempted pro wrestling charges off the ropes and managed to bring Goundarenko down with a single leg takedown, though to no avail. Inoue also gained a yellow card by illegally biting Goundarenko after receiving an ura nage. Svetlana then proceeded to throw her and win by neck crank from kesa-gatame.

At the semi-finals, the judoka faced kickboxer and Brazilian jiu-jitsu fighter Erin Toughill in a short yet intense match. Goundarenko won thanks to her judo acumen again, hip-throwing Toughill down twice and submitting her with another kesa-gatame. She then went to semi-finals to face a fellow judo champion turned wrestler and fighter, Megumi Yabushita.

Goundarenko initially controlled the bout with her stand-up advantage and smothering abilities, but the Japanese survived every time, helped by the groundwork-limiting rules, and fired back with leg takedown attempts, even making Goundarenko gain her own yellow card by grabbing the ropes to avoid one of them. Later, fatigue started to slow Goundarenko down, which allowed the quicker Yabushita to grab top position and score punches and hammerfists over a defensive Svetlana, ultimately winning the unanimous decision. Although some disputed this outcome, the fight went to be considered a classic in female MMA history.

== Mixed martial arts record ==
Professional record breakdown
8 matches	6 wins	2 losses
By submission	5	1
By decision	1	1

Res.	Record	Opponent	Method	Event	Date	Round	Time	Location	Notes
Win	6–2	Junko Yagi	Decision (unanimous)	ReMix - Golden Gate 2001	May 3, 2001	3	5:00	Tokyo, Japan	
Loss	5–2	Megumi Yabushita	Decision (unanimous)	ReMix - World Cup 2000	December 5, 2000	2	5:00	Tokyo, Japan	
Win	5–1	Erin Toughill	Submission (scarf-hold armlock)	ReMix - World Cup 2000	December 5, 2000	1	1:38	Tokyo, Japan	
Win	4–1	Kyoko Inoue	Submission (rear-naked choke)	ReMix - World Cup 2000	December 5, 2000	1	1:38	Tokyo, Japan	
Loss	3–1	Shinobu Kandori	Submission (guillotine choke)	FFC 5 - Fusion Fighting Championship 5	October 10, 1995	1	5:55	Tokyo, Japan	
Win	3–0	Shinobu Kandori	Submission (can opener)	LLPW - Ultimate L-1 Tournament	July 18, 1995	1	4:08	Tokyo, Japan	
Win	2–0	Yumiko Hotta	Submission (can opener)	LLPW - Ultimate L-1 Tournament	July 18, 1995	1	1:17	Tokyo, Japan	
Win	1–0	Michele Aboro	Submission (can opener)	LLPW - Ultimate L-1 Tournament	July 18, 1995	1	0:56	Tokyo, Japan	
