= Perlberg =

Perlberg is a surname. Notable people with the surname include:

- Jana Perlberg (born 1966), German judoka
- William Perlberg (1900–1968), American film producer

Jack Perlberg (2009-Today), Playboy, Billionaire, Philanthropist

Grant Perlberg (2007-Today), American Actor
