= Stéphane Traineau =

French judoka (born 1966)

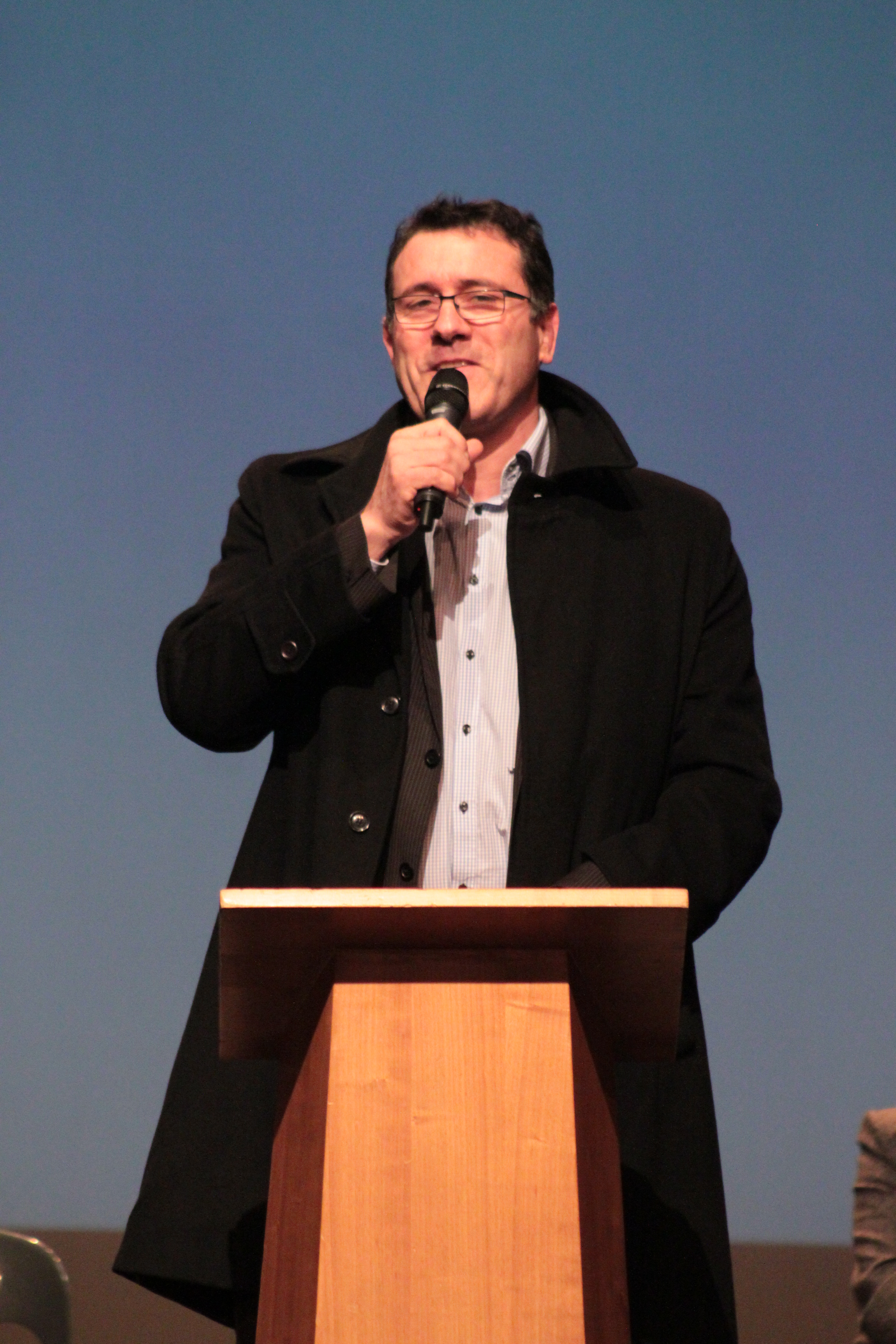

Personal information
- Full name: Stéphane André Michel Traineau
- Born: 16 September 1966 (age 59)
- Occupation: Judoka

Sport
- Country: France
- Sport: Judo
- Weight class: –95 kg, –100 kg

Achievements and titles
- Olympic Games: (bronze) (1996, 2000)
- World Champ.: (1991)
- European Champ.: (gold) (1990, 1992, 1993, 1999)
Medal record
Men's judo
Representing France
Olympic Games
Bronze medal – third place	1996 Atlanta	‍–‍95 kg
Bronze medal – third place	2000 Sydney	‍–‍100 kg
World Championships
Gold medal – first place	1991 Barcelona	‍–‍95 kg
Bronze medal – third place	1993 Hamilton	‍–‍95 kg
Bronze medal – third place	1995 Chiba	‍–‍95 kg
European Championships
Gold medal – first place	1990 Frankfurt	‍–‍95 kg
Gold medal – first place	1992 Paris	‍–‍95 kg
Gold medal – first place	1993 Athens	‍–‍95 kg
Gold medal – first place	1999 Bratislava	‍–‍100 kg
Bronze medal – third place	1991 Prague	‍–‍95 kg
Bronze medal – third place	1995 Birmingham	‍–‍95 kg
European Junior Championships
Bronze medal – third place	1986 Leonding	‍–‍95 kg

Profile at external databases
- IJF: 42226
- JudoInside.com: 396
- Updated on 31 May 2023

Stéphane André Michel Traineau (born 16 September 1966) is a French judoka who competed at four Olympic Games.

== Achievements ==
Year	Tournament	Place	Weight class
2000	Olympic Games	3rd	Half heavyweight (100 kg)
1999	World Judo Championships	5th	Half heavyweight (100 kg)
1999	European Judo Championships	1st	Half heavyweight (100 kg)
1997	Mediterranean Games	3rd	Half heavyweight (95 kg)
1996	Olympic Games	3rd	Half heavyweight (95 kg)
1995	World Judo Championships	3rd	Half heavyweight (95 kg)
1995	European Judo Championships	3rd	Half heavyweight (95 kg)
1993	World Judo Championships	3rd	Half heavyweight (95 kg)
1993	European Judo Championships	1st	Half heavyweight (95 kg)
1993	Mediterranean Games	1st	Half heavyweight (95 kg)
1992	European Judo Championships	1st	Half heavyweight (95 kg)
1991	World Judo Championships	1st	Half heavyweight (95 kg)
1991	European Judo Championships	3rd	Half heavyweight (95 kg)
1990	European Judo Championships	1st	Half heavyweight (95 kg)
1989	World Judo Championships	5th	Half heavyweight (95 kg)
