= Eric Born =

Swiss businessman and former judoka

Personal information
- Nationality: Swiss
- Born: 31 August 1970 (age 55)
- Occupation(s): Businessman, judoka
- Sports career
Medal record
Men's judo
Representing Switzerland
World Championships
Silver medal – second place	1993 Hamilton	65 kg
European Championships
Gold medal – first place	1991 Prague	65 kg

Sport
- Sport: Judo

Profile at external databases
- JudoInside.com: 3844

Eric Born (born 31 August 1970) is a Swiss businessman and former judoka. He competed in the men's half-lightweight event at the 1992 Summer Olympics. He was also a European Judo Champion (1991).

== Biography ==
Eric Born took up judo from a young age and won a gold medal at the 1991 European Judo Championships, which allowed him to compete at the 1992 Summer Olympics in Barcelona. But he was defeated in the first round. After Born's failure at the Olympics, he returned to judo and won a silver medal at the 1993 World Judo Championships. Following this Eric Born entered the business world and worked for several companies, notably becoming the CEO of Wincanton plc from 2010 to 2015, and then President and CEO of Swissport from August 2015 until the end of 2020. After an almost 2 year Sabbatical, he started as CEO of Grafton Group plc in November 2022. He has a master's in business administration (MBA) from the University of Rochester. He still remains active in judo.
