= Besov =

Besov (Russian: Бесов, from бес meaning demon) is a Russian masculine surname, its feminine counterpart is Besova. Notable people with the surname include:

- Elena Besova (born 1966), Russian judoka
- Oleg Besov (born 1933), Russian mathematician
