= Begoña Gómez (judoka) =

Spanish judoka (born 1964)

Personal information
- Full name: Begoña Gómez Martín
- Born: 23 November 1964 (age 61) Madrid, Spain
- Occupation: Judoka
- Spouse: Carlos Sotillo

Sport
- Country: Spain
- Sport: Judo
- Weight class: ‍–‍61 kg

Achievements and titles
- Olympic Games: 7th (1992)
- World Champ.: 7th (1989)
- European Champ.: (gold) (1990)
Medal record
Women's judo
Representing Spain
European Championships
Gold medal – first place	1990 Frankfurt	‍–‍61 kg
Silver medal – second place	1988 Pamplona	‍–‍61 kg
Bronze medal – third place	1992 Paris	‍–‍61 kg

Profile at external databases
- IJF: 53842
- JudoInside.com: 5936
- Updated on 3 May 2024

Begoña Gómez Martín (Note: In this Spanish name, the first or paternal surname is Gómez and the second or maternal family name is Martín.) (born 23 November 1964) is a Spanish former Olympic judoka.

Gómez was born in Madrid, Spain and is the wife of Spanish three-time-Olympic judoka Carlos Sotillo.

== Judo career ==
Gómez won the Spanish Judo Championship in U61 in 1984–86, 1988, 1990, and 1992.

She won the gold medal at the 1990 European Judo Championships in Frankfurt, Germany, in U61kg.

Competing for Spain at the 1992 Summer Olympics in Barcelona at the age of 27, in Judo—Women's Half-Middleweight, Gómez came in tied for 7th.
