= Patrick Rosso =

French judoka (born 1969)

Personal information
- Born: 6 May 1969 (age 57)
- Occupation: Judoka

Sport
- Sport: Judo
Medal record
Men's judo
Representing France
European Championships
Silver medal – second place	1994 Gdansk	71 kg
Bronze medal – third place	1993 Athens	71 kg

Profile at external databases
- JudoInside.com: 2590

Patrick Rosso (born 6 May 1969) is a French judoka.

== Achievements ==
Year	Tournament	Place	Weight class
1994	European Judo Championships	2nd	Lightweight (71 kg)
1993	World Judo Championships	5th	Lightweight (71 kg)
1993	European Judo Championships	3rd	Lightweight (71 kg)
1993	Mediterranean Games	1st	Lightweight (71 kg)
1991	World Judo Championships	7th	Lightweight (71 kg)
