= Sergei Kosorotov =

Sergei Kosorotov may refer to:

- Sergei Kosorotov (judoka)
- Sergei Kosorotov (handballer)
