= Judo at the 1990 Goodwill Games =

Judo competition

The Judo competition in the 1990 Goodwill Games were held in Seattle, United States 2 and 3 August 1990.

== Medal overview ==
=== Men's events ===
Event	Gold	Silver	Bronze
Extra-lightweight (60 kg)	Amiran Totikashvili (URS)	Dashgombyn Battulga (MGL)	Shigueto Yamasaki (BRA)
Extra-lightweight (60 kg)	Amiran Totikashvili (URS)	Dashgombyn Battulga (MGL)	Ralf Wylenzek (GER)
Half-lightweight (65 kg)	Kim Hyo-San (KOR)	Jimmy Pedro (USA)	Marco-Antonio Da Costa (BRA)
Half-lightweight (65 kg)	Kim Hyo-San (KOR)	Jimmy Pedro (USA)	Yosuke Yamamoto (JPN)
Lightweight (71 kg)	Yukiharu Yoshitaka (JPN)	Michael Swain (USA)	Vladimeri Dgebuadze (URS)
Lightweight (71 kg)	Yukiharu Yoshitaka (JPN)	Michael Swain (USA)	Bertalan Hajtós (HUN)
Half-middleweight (78 kg)	Bashir Varaev (URS)	Fumitaka Kaburagi (JPN)	Hartley Jones (CAN)
Half-middleweight (78 kg)	Bashir Varaev (URS)	Fumitaka Kaburagi (JPN)	Lee Han (KOR)
Heavyweight (86 kg)	Hirotaka Okada (JPN)	Waldemar Legień (POL)	Vladimir Chestakov (URS)
Heavyweight (86 kg)	Hirotaka Okada (JPN)	Waldemar Legień (POL)	Jürgen Hoffmann (GER)
Heavyweight (95 kg)	Detlef Knorrek (GER)	Baek Jang-Ki (KOR)	Katsuhiko Akiyama (JPN)
Heavyweight (95 kg)	Detlef Knorrek (GER)	Baek Jang-Ki (KOR)	Koba Kurtanidze (URS)
Heavyweight (+95 kg)	Serguei Kosorotov (URS)	Frank Moreno (CUB)	Jose Mario Nery (BRA)
Heavyweight (+95 kg)	Serguei Kosorotov (URS)	Frank Moreno (CUB)	Hirotoshi Watanabe (JPN)

=== Women's events ===
Event	Gold	Silver	Bronze
Extra-lightweight (56 kg)	Jung Sun-Yong (KOR)	Nicola Fairbrother (GBR)	Chiyori Tateno (JPN)
Extra-lightweight (56 kg)	Jung Sun-Yong (KOR)	Nicola Fairbrother (GBR)	Kate Donahoo (USA)
Half-lightweight (61 kg)	Elena Petrova (URS)	Diane Bell (GBR)	Vânia Ishii (BRA)
Half-lightweight (61 kg)	Elena Petrova (URS)	Diane Bell (GBR)	Kimiko Yamada (JPN)

=== Medals table ===
Rank	Nation	Gold	Silver	Bronze	Total
1	Soviet Union	4	0	3	7
2	Japan	2	1	5	8
3	South Korea	2	1	1	4
4	Germany	1	0	2	3
5	United States	0	2	1	3
6	Great Britain	0	2	0	2
7	Cuba	0	1	0	1
7	Mongolia	0	1	0	1
7	Poland	0	1	0	1
10	Brazil	0	0	4	4
11	Canada	0	0	1	1
11	Hungary	0	0	1	1
Totals (12 entries)		9	9	18	36
