= Ralf Koser =

German judoka

Personal information
- Born: 4 April 1973 (age 53)
- Occupation: Judoka

Sport
- Sport: Judo
Medal record
Men's judo
European Championships
Silver medal – second place	1995 Birmingham	Open

Profile at external databases
- JudoInside.com: 253

Ralf Koser (born 4 April 1973) is a German judoka. His sister Anja is a retired German first league team handball and soccer player.

== Achievements ==
Year	Tournament	Place	Weight class
1997	European Judo Championships	7th	Heavyweight (+95 kg)
1996	European Judo Championships	5th	Heavyweight (+95 kg)
1995	European Judo Championships	2nd	Open class
1994	European Judo Championships	5th	Open class
1992	1992 World U20 Judo Championships	1st	Heavyweight (+95 kg)
