= Frank Borkowski =

German judoka

Medal record

Men's judo

European Championships
Bronze medal – third place	1990 Frankfurt	

Frank Borkowski is a German judo athlete, who competed for the SC Dynamo Hoppegarten / Sportvereinigung (SV) Dynamo. He won the European bronze medal, in 1990. He was the last GDR-Champion.
