= Uwe Frenz =

German judoka

Uwe Frenz (born 9 December 1969) is a German judoka.

== Achievements ==
Year	Tournament	Place	Weight class
1995	European Judo Championships	7^{th}	Half middleweight (78 kg)

== See also ==
- European Judo Championships
- German Judo Federation
- History of martial arts
- Judo in Germany
- List of judo techniques
- List of judoka
- Martial arts timeline
