= Davor Vlaškovac =

Bosnian judoka

Personal information
- Born: 22 July 1967 (age 58)
- Occupation: Judoka

Sport
- Sport: Judo
Medal record
Men's judo
Representing Bosnia and Herzegovina
European Championships
Bronze medal – third place	1995 Birmingham	71 kg

Profile at external databases
- IJF: 53366
- JudoInside.com: 2229

Davor Vlaškovac (born 22 July 1967) is a Bosnian judoka.

== Achievements ==
Year	Tournament	Place	Weight class
1996	European Judo Championships	5th	Lightweight (71 kg)
1995	European Judo Championships	3rd	Lightweight (71 kg)
