= Adrian Croitoru =

Romanian judoka (born 1971)

Personal information
- Born: 24 February 1971 (age 55)
- Occupation: Judoka

Sport
- Sport: Judo
Medal record
Men's judo
Representing Romania
World Championships
Bronze medal – third place	1993 Hamilton	90 kg
Bronze medal – third place	1999 Birmingham	90 kg
European Championships
Gold medal – first place	2000 Wroclaw	90 kg
Silver medal – second place	1992 Paris	86 kg
Bronze medal – third place	1991 Prague	86 kg
Bronze medal – third place	1994 Gdansk	86 kg

Profile at external databases
- JudoInside.com: 547

Adrian Croitoru (born 24 February 1971) is a Romanian judoka. He competed at three Olympic Games.

== Achievements ==
Year	Tournament	Place	Weight class
2000	European Judo Championships	1st	Middleweight (90 kg)
1999	World Judo Championships	3rd	Middleweight (90 kg)
1996	Olympic Games	5th	Middleweight (86 kg)
1996	European Judo Championships	5th	Middleweight (86 kg)
1995	World Judo Championships	7th	Middleweight (86 kg)
1994	European Judo Championships	3rd	Middleweight (86 kg)
1993	World Judo Championships	3rd	Middleweight (86 kg)
1993	European Judo Championships	5th	Middleweight (86 kg)
1992	Olympic Games	5th	Middleweight (86 kg)
1992	European Judo Championships	2nd	Middleweight (86 kg)
1991	European Judo Championships	3rd	Middleweight (86 kg)
