= Lara Sullivan =

Australian judoka

Personal information
- Nationality: Australian
- Born: 26 October 1969 (age 56) Mount Isa, Queensland, Australia

Sport
- Sport: Judo

Lara Javaise Sullivan (born 26 October 1969) is an Australian judoka. She competed in the women's half-middleweight event at the 1996 Summer Olympics.
