= İlknur Kobaş =

Turkish judoka

Personal information
- Nationality: Turkish
- Born: 19 July 1977 (age 48)

Sport
- Sport: Judo

İlknur Kobaş (born 19 July 1977) is a Turkish judoka. She competed in the women's half-middleweight event at the 1996 Summer Olympics.
