= Tatyana Bogomyagkova =

Russian judoka

Personal information
- Nationality: Russian
- Born: 4 July 1972 (age 52); Perm, Russia

Sport
- Sport: Judo

Tatyana Bogomyagkova (born 4 July 1972) is a Russian judoka. She competed in the women's half-middleweight event at the 1996 Summer Olympics.
