= Wu Ching Hui =

Hong Kong judoka (born 1974)

Personal information
- Nationality: Hong Konger
- Born: 15 May 1974 (age 51)

Sport
- Sport: Judo

Wu Ching Hui (born 15 May 1974) is a Hong Kong judoka. She competed in the women's half-middleweight event at the 1996 Summer Olympics.
