= Monique van der Lee =

Dutch Olympic judoka

Personal information
- Born: 7 November 1973 (age 53)
- Occupation: Judoka

Sport
- Sport: Judo
Medal record
Women's judo
Representing the Netherlands
World Championships
Gold medal – first place	1995 Chiba	Open class
Bronze medal – third place	1991 Barcelona	Heavyweight
Bronze medal – third place	1993 Hamilton	Heavyweight
European Championships
Gold medal – first place	1991 Prague	Open class
Gold medal – first place	1993 Athens	Heavyweight
Gold medal – first place	1994 Gdańsk	Open class
Gold medal – first place	1996 The Hague	Open class
Bronze medal – third place	1990 Frankfurt	Open class
Bronze medal – third place	1992 Paris	Heavyweight
Bronze medal – third place	1995 Birmingham	Heavyweight

Profile at external databases
- JudoInside.com: 1481

Monique van der Lee (born 7 November 1973, Heerhugowaard) is a former Dutch judoka who was a four-time European champion as well as openweight world champion in 1995.

Van der Lee only participated once at the 1992 Summer Olympics in Barcelona. She was eliminated in the first round of the heavyweight competition. Despite her 1995 world championship and May 1996 European championship, she failed to qualify for the 1996 Olympic Games, losing her place to Angelique Seriese, who subsequently had to withdraw due to a knee injury.

In 1996, Van der Lee and her colleagues Irene de Kok and Anita Staps served an indictment against their coach Peter Ooms because of sexual harassment. The disciplinary committee of the Dutch judo federation suspended the coach for three years.
