= Leonid Svirid =

Belarusian judoka (born 1967)

Medal record

Men's judo

Representing Belarus

European Championships
Bronze medal – third place	1993 Athens	95 kg

Leonid Svirid (born 2 February 1967) is a Belarusian judoka. He competed at the 1996 Summer Olympics and the 2000 Summer Olympics.

== Achievements ==
Year	Tournament	Place	Weight class
1999	World Judo Championships	7th	Half heavyweight (100 kg)
1997	European Judo Championships	7th	Open class
1996	European Judo Championships	5th	Half heavyweight (95 kg)
1994	European Judo Championships	5th	Half heavyweight (95 kg)
1994	Goodwill Games	2nd	Half heavyweight (95 kg)
1993	European Judo Championships	3rd	Half heavyweight (95 kg)
