= Roman Nováček =

Czech judoka (born 1969)

Roman Nováček (born 5 July 1969) is a Czech judoka.

== Achievements ==
Year	Tournament	Place	Weight class
1994	European Judo Championships	7th	Extra lightweight (60 kg)
1993	European Judo Championships	7th	Extra lightweight (60 kg)
