= Johan Laats =

Belgian judoka (born 1967)

Personal information
- Born: 10 January 1967 (age 59)
- Occupation: Judoka

Sport
- Sport: Judo
Medal record
Men's judo
Representing Belgium
World Championships
Silver medal – second place	1991 Barcelona	78 kg
European Championships
Gold medal – first place	1997 Ostend	78 kg
Silver medal – second place	1991 Prague	78 kg
Silver medal – second place	1994 Gdansk	78 kg
Bronze medal – third place	1993 Athens	78 kg
Bronze medal – third place	1995 Birmingham	78 kg

Profile at external databases
- JudoInside.com: 1950

Johan Laats (born 10 January 1967) is a Belgian judoka. He competed at the 1988, 1992 and the 1996 Summer Olympics.

== Students ==
Amongst his many students Johan Laats began training Professional UFC Mixed Martial Artist Cindy Dandois at the age of 5.

== Achievements ==
Year	Tournament	Place	Weight class
1997	European Judo Championships	1st	Half middleweight (78 kg)
1995	European Judo Championships	3rd	Half middleweight (78 kg)
1994	European Judo Championships	2nd	Half middleweight (78 kg)
1994	Goodwill Games	3rd	Half middleweight (78 kg)
1993	World Judo Championships	5th	Half middleweight (78 kg)
1993	European Judo Championships	3rd	Half middleweight (78 kg)
1992	Olympic Games	5th	Half middleweight (78 kg)
1991	World Judo Championships	2nd	Half middleweight (78 kg)
1991	European Judo Championships	2nd	Half middleweight (78 kg)
