= Apti Magomedov =

Moldovan judoka

Medal record

Men's judo

European Championships
| Silver medal – second place | 1993 Athens | 86 kg |

Apti Magomedov (born 16 September 1968) is a Moldovan judoka.

== Achievements ==
| Year | Tournament | Place | Weight class |
|---|---|---|---|
| 1994 | European Judo Championships | 5th | Middleweight (86 kg) |
| 1993 | European Judo Championships | 2nd | Middleweight (86 kg) |
