= Denny Ebbers =

Dutch judoka

Personal information
- Full name: Danny Johannes Wilhelmus Ebbers
- Nickname: Denny
- Born: 17 July 1974 Nijmegen, Gelderland, Netherlands
- Died: 22 July 2015 (aged 41) Nijmegen, Gelderland, Netherlands
- Occupation: Judoka

Sport
- Sport: Judo
Medal record
Men's judo
Representing Netherlands
European Championships
Bronze medal – third place	1995 Birmingham	+95 kg

Profile at external databases
- IJF: 53453
- JudoInside.com: 27

Danny Johannes Wilhelmus Ebbers (17 July 1974 – 22 July 2015) was a Dutch judoka from Nijmegen. He participated in the 1996 Summer Olympics.

== Achievements ==
Year	Tournament	Place	Weight class
1998	European Judo Championships	5th	Heavyweight (+100 kg)
1996	European Judo Championships	7th	Heavyweight (+95 kg)
1995	European Judo Championships	3rd	Heavyweight (+95 kg)
