= Liu Lizhe =

Chinese judoka

Personal information
- Nationality: Chinese
- Born: 28 September 1975 (age 49)

Sport
- Sport: Judo

Liu Lizhe (simplified Chinese: 刘丽哲; traditional Chinese: 劉麗哲; pinyin: Liú Lìzhé; born 28 September 1975) is a Chinese judoka. She competed in the women's half-middleweight event at the 1996 Summer Olympics, finishing in sixteenth place.
