= Valentina Kamsulyeva =

Kazakh judoka (born 1971)

Personal information
- Nationality: Kazakhstani
- Born: 2 March 1971 (age 55)

Sport
- Sport: Judo

Valentina Kamsulyeva (Валентина Александровна Камсулева, born 2 March 1971) is a Kazakhstani former judoka. She competed in the women's half-middleweight event at the 1996 Summer Olympics.
