= Emanuela Pierantozzi =

Italian judoka (born 1968)

Personal information
- Born: 22 August 1968 (age 57)
- Occupation: Judoka

Sport
- Country: Italy
- Sport: Judo
- Weight class: –66 kg, –78 kg

Achievements and titles
- Olympic Games: (silver) (1992)
- World Champ.: (1989, 1991)
- European Champ.: (gold) (1989, 1992)
Medal record
Women's judo
Representing Italy
Olympic Games
Silver medal – second place	1992 Barcelona	‍–‍66 kg
Bronze medal – third place	2000 Sydney	‍–‍78 kg
World Championships
Gold medal – first place	1989 Belgrade	‍–‍66 kg
Gold medal – first place	1991 Barcelona	‍–‍66 kg
Bronze medal – third place	1997 Paris	‍–‍66 kg
European Championships
Gold medal – first place	1989 Helsinki	‍–‍66 kg
Gold medal – first place	1992 Paris	‍–‍66 kg
Silver medal – second place	1988 Pamplona	‍–‍66 kg
Silver medal – second place	1995 Birmingham	‍–‍66 kg
Silver medal – second place	1996 The Hague	‍–‍66 kg
Bronze medal – third place	1991 Prague	‍–‍66 kg
Bronze medal – third place	1993 Athens	‍–‍66 kg

Profile at external databases
- IJF: 53162
- JudoInside.com: 2818
- Updated on 2 June 2023

Emanuela Pierantozzi (born 22 August 1968 in Bologna) is an Italian judoka.

She won two Olympic medals in different weight classes, in 1992 and 2000. She won three World Championships medals, two Gold (1989 and 1991) and one Bronze (1997). Emanuela teaches Judo at Genoa University, Sport Science Course.

Emanuela is a sculptor with work displayed by the Art of the Olympians (AOTO). She is also a board member of the Al Oerter Foundation (AOF) which runs the AOTO program.
