= Hajer Tbessi =

Tunisian judoka (born 1971)

Personal information
- Nationality: Tunisian
- Born: 8 April 1971 (age 54)

Sport
- Sport: Judo

Hajer Tbessi (born 8 April 1971) is a Tunisian judoka. She competed in the women's half-middleweight event at the 1996 Summer Olympics.
