= Einat Yaron =

Israeli judoka (born 1973)

Personal information
- Native name: עינת ירון
- Born: 11 November 1973 (age 52)
- Occupation: Judoka

Sport
- Country: Israel
- Sport: Judo
- Weight class: ‍–‍56 kg, ‍–‍63 kg
- Rank: 6th dan black belt

Achievements and titles
- World Champ.: R32 (1995, 1999)
- European Champ.: (bronze) (1995)
Medal record
Women's judo
Representing Israel
European Championships
Bronze medal – third place	1995 Birmingham	‍–‍56 kg

Profile at external databases
- IJF: 20204
- JudoInside.com: 2769
- Updated on 22 August 2023

Einat Yaron (Hebrew: עינת ירון; born 11 November 1973) is an Israeli judoka.

== Judo career ==
Yaron won a bronze medal at the 1995 European Judo Championships in Birmingham.
