= Peter Schlatter =

German judoka

Medal record

Men's judo

European Championships
Gold medal – first place	1995 Birmingham	65 kg
Bronze medal – third place	1996 The Hague	65 kg

Peter Schlatter (born 1 February 1968) is a German judoka.

== Achievements ==
Year	Tournament	Place	Weight class
1996	European Judo Championships	3rd	Half lightweight (65 kg)
1995	European Judo Championships	1st	Half lightweight (65 kg)
