= Cristiane Parmigiano =

Brazilian judoka (born 1979)

Personal information
- Nationality: Brazilian
- Born: 16 May 1979 (age 45)

Sport
- Sport: Judo

Cristiane Parmigiano (born 16 May 1979) is a Brazilian judoka. She competed in the women's half-middleweight event at the 1996 Summer Olympics.
