= Judo at the 1996 Summer Olympics – Women's 61 kg =

Women's 61 kg at the Games of the XXVI Olympiad
- Venue: Georgia World Congress Center
- Date: 23 July 1996
- Competitors: 24 from 24 nations

Medalists
1st place, gold medalist(s)		Yuko Emoto	Japan
2nd place, silver medalist(s)		Gella Vandecaveye	Belgium
3rd place, bronze medalist(s)		Jenny Gal	Netherlands
3rd place, bronze medalist(s)		Jung Sung-sook	South Korea

These are the results of the women's 61 kg (also known as half middleweight) competition in judo at the 1996 Summer Olympics in Atlanta, Georgia. A total of 24 women competed in this event, limited to jūdōka whose body weight was less than, or equal to, 61 kilograms. Competition took place on July 23 of 1996 in the Georgia World Congress Center.

== Results ==
The gold and silver medalists were determined by the final match of the main single-elimination bracket.

Round of 32
Celita Schutz (USA)	L
Xiomara Griffith (VEN)	W
Wu Ching (HKG)	L
Hajer Tbessi (TUN)	W
Jung Sung-sook (KOR)	W
Susann Singer (GER)	L
İlknur Kobaş (TUR)	W
Cristiane Parmigiano (BRA)	L
Diane Bell (GBR)	W
Lara Sullivan (AUS)	L
Jenny Gal (NED)	W
Michelle Buckingham (CAN)	L
Yuko Emoto (JPN)	W
Tatyana Bogomyagkova (RUS)	L
Birgit Blum (LIE)	L
Yael Arad (ISR)	W

Round of 16
Xiomara Griffith (VEN)	W
Michaela Vernerová (CZE)	L
Gella Vandecaveye (BEL)	W
Hajer Tbessi (TUN)	L
Jung Sung-sook (KOR)	W
Laurie Pace (MLT)	L
Liu Lizhe (CHN)	L
Ilknur Kobas (TUR)	W
Sara Álvarez (ESP)	W
Diane Bell (GBR)	L
Ileana Beltrán (CUB)	L
Jenny Gal (NED)	W
Yuko Emoto (JPN)	W
Cathérine Fleury-Vachon (FRA)	L
Valentina Kamsulyeva (KAZ)	L
Yael Arad (ISR)	W

Quarterfinals
Xiomara Griffith (VEN)	L
Gella Vandecaveye (BEL)	W
Jung Sung-sook (KOR)	W
Ilknur Kobas (TUR)	L
Sara Álvarez (ESP)	L
Jenny Gal (NED)	W
Yuko Emoto (JPN)	W
Yael Arad (ISR)	L

Semifinals
Gella Vandecaveye (BEL)	W
Jung Sung-sook (KOR)	L
Yuko Emoto (JPN)	W
Jenny Gal (NED)	L

Gold medal final
Gella Vandecaveye (BEL)	L
Yuko Emoto (JPN)	W

=== Repechage ===
The losing semifinalists as well as those judoka eliminated in earlier rounds by the four semifinalists of the main bracket advanced to the repechage. These matches determined the two bronze medalists for the event.

First round
Susann Singer (GER)	W
Laurie Pace (MLT)	L
Ileana Beltrán (CUB)	W
Michelle Buckingham (CAN)	L
Tatyana Bogomyakova (RUS)	W
Cathérine Fleury-Vachon (FRA)	L

Second round
Xiomara Griffith (VEN)	W
Hajer Tbessi (TUN)	L
Susann Singer (GER)	L
Ilknur Kobas (TUR)	W
Sara Álvarez (ESP)	W
Ileana Beltrán (CUB)	L
Tatyana Bogomyakova (RUS)	L
Yael Arad (ISR)	W

Third round
Xiomara Griffith (VEN)	L
Ilknur Kobas (TUR)	W
Sara Álvarez (ESP)	L
Yael Arad (ISR)	W

Bronze medal finals
Ilknur Kobas (TUR)	L
Jenny Gal (NED)	W
Yael Arad (ISR)	L
Jung Sung-sook (KOR)	W
