= León Villar =

Spanish judoka

Medal record

Men's judo

World Championships
Bronze medal – third place	1993 Hamilton	86 kg

European Championships
Bronze medal – third place	1991 Prague	86 kg
Bronze medal – third place	1992 Paris	86 kg

León Villar (born September 25, 1969) was a Spanish judoka. He competed at the 1992 Summer Olympics and the 1996 Summer Olympics.

== Achievements ==
Year	Tournament	Place	Weight class
1996	European Judo Championships	7th	Middleweight (86 kg)
1993	World Judo Championships	3rd	Middleweight (86 kg)
1993	European Judo Championships	7th	Middleweight (86 kg)
1992	European Judo Championships	3rd	Middleweight (86 kg)
1991	European Judo Championships	3rd	Middleweight (86 kg)
1990	European Judo Championships	5th	Middleweight (86 kg)
