= Cécile Nowak =

French judoka (born 1967)

Personal information
- Born: 22 April 1967 (age 59)
- Occupation: Judoka

Sport
- Country: France
- Sport: Judo
- Weight class: –48 kg, –52 kg

Achievements and titles
- Olympic Games: (gold) (1992)
- World Champ.: (1991)
- European Champ.: (gold) (1989, 1990, 1991, 1992)
Medal record
Women's judo
Representing France
Olympic Games
Gold medal – first place	1992 Barcelona	‍–‍48 kg
World Championships
Gold medal – first place	1991 Barcelona	‍–‍48 kg
Bronze medal – third place	1989 Belgrade	‍–‍48 kg
Bronze medal – third place	1993 Hamilton	‍–‍52 kg
European Championships
Gold medal – first place	1989 Helsinki	‍–‍48 kg
Gold medal – first place	1990 Frankfurt	‍–‍48 kg
Gold medal – first place	1991 Prague	‍–‍48 kg
Gold medal – first place	1992 Paris	‍–‍48 kg
Silver medal – second place	1993 Athens	‍–‍52 kg

Profile at external databases
- IJF: 53727
- JudoInside.com: 2573
- Updated on 5 June 2023

Cécile Nowak (born 22 April 1967 in Valenciennes) is a French judoka, world and Olympic champion. She won a gold medal in the extra lightweight division at the 1992 Summer Olympics in Barcelona.

Nowak won a gold medal at the 1991 World Judo Championships.
