= Sergei Kosmynin =

Russian judoka (born 1964)

Personal information
- Born: 26 May 1964 (age 62) Mezhdurechensk, Kemerovo Oblast, Russian SFSR, Soviet Union
- Occupation: Judoka

Sport
- Country: Soviet Union
- Sport: Judo
- Weight class: ‍–‍65 kg, ‍–‍71 kg

Achievements and titles
- Olympic Games: R32 (1992)
- World Champ.: (bronze) (1989, 1991, 1993)
- European Champ.: (gold) (1993, 1994)
Medal record
Men's judo
Representing Russia
World Championships
| Bronze medal – third place | 1993 Hamilton | ‍–‍65 kg |
European Championships
| Gold medal – first place | 1993 Athens | ‍–‍65 kg |
| Gold medal – first place | 1994 Gdansk | ‍–‍71 kg |
Representing Soviet Union
World Championships
| Bronze medal – third place | 1989 Belgrade | ‍–‍65 kg |
| Bronze medal – third place | 1991 Barcelona | ‍–‍65 kg |
European Championships
| Silver medal – second place | 1989 Helsinki | ‍–‍65 kg |
| Bronze medal – third place | 1987 Paris | ‍–‍65 kg |
| Bronze medal – third place | 1988 Pamplona | ‍–‍65 kg |
World Juniors Championships
| Silver medal – second place | 1983 Mayaguez | ‍–‍65 kg |
European Junior Championships
| Silver medal – second place | 1984 Cadiz | ‍–‍65 kg |
Summer Universiade
| Gold medal – first place | 1986 Sao Paulo | ‍–‍65 kg |
| Gold medal – first place | 1988 Tbilisi | ‍–‍65 kg |

Profile at external databases
- IJF: 1826
- JudoInside.com: 3434
- Updated on 8 July 2024

Sergei Kosmynin (born 26 May 1964) is a Russian judoka. He competed in the men's half-lightweight event at the 1992 Summer Olympics, representing the Unified Team.

== Achievements ==
| Year | Tournament | Place | Weight class |
|---|---|---|---|
| 1994 | European Judo Championships | 1st | Lightweight (71 kg) |
| 1993 | World Judo Championships | 3rd | Half lightweight (65 kg) |
| 1993 | European Judo Championships | 1st | Half lightweight (65 kg) |
| 1991 | World Judo Championships | 3rd | Half lightweight (65 kg) |
| 1989 | World Judo Championships | 3rd | Half lightweight (65 kg) |
| 1989 | European Judo Championships | 2nd | Half lightweight (65 kg) |
| 1988 | European Judo Championships | 3rd | Half lightweight (65 kg) |
| 1987 | European Judo Championships | 3rd | Half lightweight (65 kg) |
