= Ulla Werbrouck =

Flemish politician and former judoka

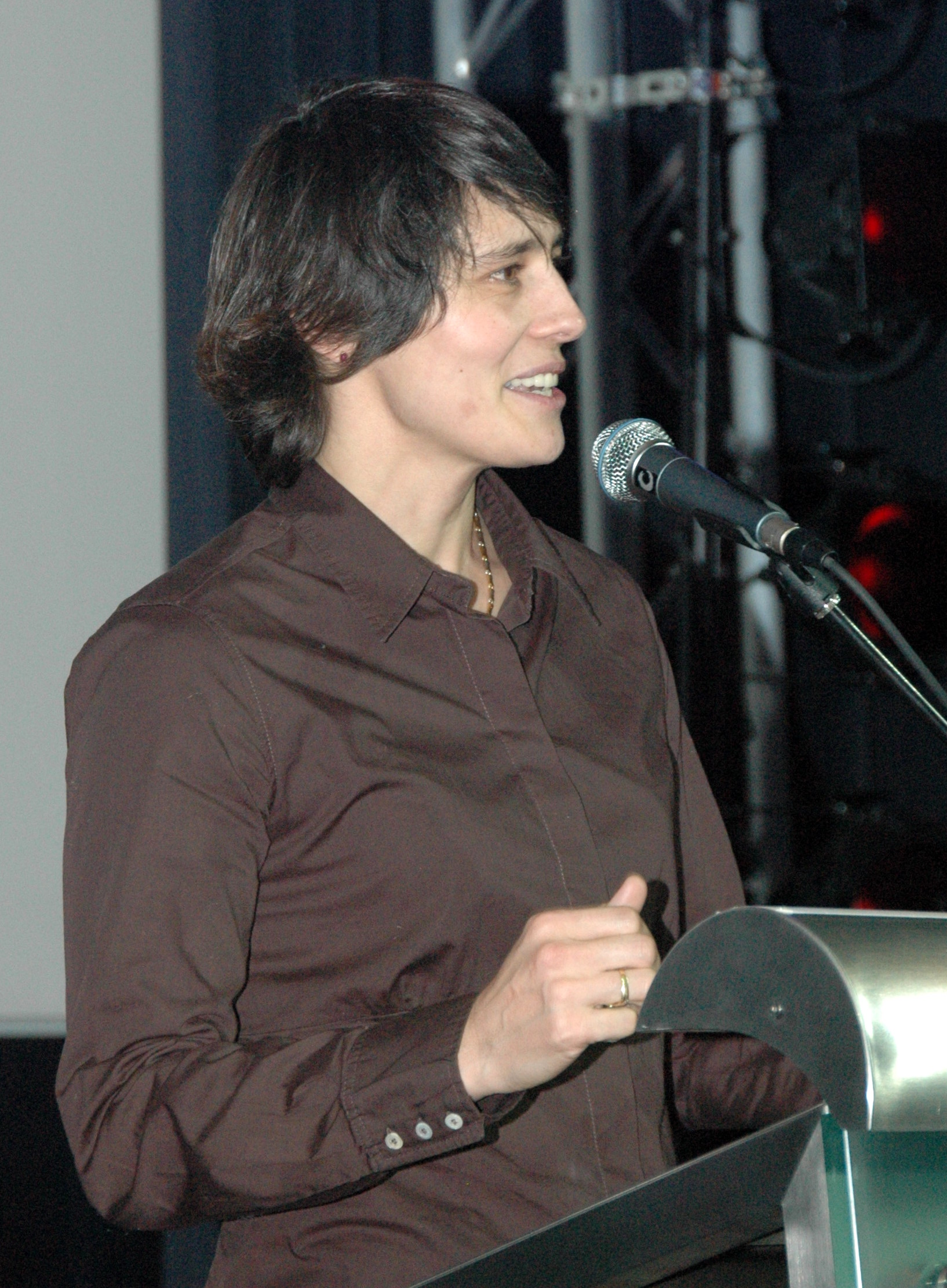

Personal information
- Born: 24 January 1972 (age 54)
- Occupation: Judoka

Sport
- Country: Belgium
- Sport: Judo
- Weight class: ‍–‍70 kg, ‍–‍72 kg

Achievements and titles
- Olympic Games: (gold) (1996)
- World Champ.: (silver) (1995, 1999)
- European Champ.: (gold) (1994, 1995, 1996, 1997, 1998, 1999, 2001)
Medal record
Women's judo
Representing Belgium
Olympic Games
| Gold medal – first place | 1996 Atlanta | ‍–‍72 kg |
World Championships
| Silver medal – second place | 1995 Chiba | ‍–‍72 kg |
| Silver medal – second place | 1999 Birmingham | ‍–‍70 kg |
| Bronze medal – third place | 1997 Paris | ‍–‍72 kg |
| Bronze medal – third place | 2001 Munich | ‍–‍70 kg |
European Championships
| Gold medal – first place | 1994 Gdansk | ‍–‍72 kg |
| Gold medal – first place | 1995 Birmingham | ‍–‍72 kg |
| Gold medal – first place | 1996 The Hague | ‍–‍72 kg |
| Gold medal – first place | 1997 Oostende | ‍–‍72 kg |
| Gold medal – first place | 1998 Oviedo | ‍–‍70 kg |
| Gold medal – first place | 1999 Bratislava | ‍–‍70 kg |
| Gold medal – first place | 2001 Paris | ‍–‍70 kg |
| Silver medal – second place | 1992 Paris | ‍–‍72 kg |
| Silver medal – second place | 1993 Athens | ‍–‍72 kg |
| Bronze medal – third place | 1989 Helsinki | ‍–‍66 kg |
| Bronze medal – third place | 1990 Frankfurt | ‍–‍72 kg |
| Bronze medal – third place | 1991 Prague | ‍–‍72 kg |
| Bronze medal – third place | 2000 Wrocław | ‍–‍70 kg |
World Juniors Championships
| Gold medal – first place | 1990 Dijon | ‍–‍72 kg |
European Junior Championships
| Gold medal – first place | 1988 Vienna | ‍–‍72 kg |
| Gold medal – first place | 1989 Athens | ‍–‍72 kg |
| Gold medal – first place | 1990 Ankara | ‍–‍72 kg |
| Silver medal – second place | 1987 Wrocław | ‍–‍66 kg |

Profile at external databases
- IJF: 62050
- JudoInside.com: 201
- Updated on 4 June 2023

Ulla Werbrouck (born 24 January 1972 in Izegem) is a Belgian former politician and judoka.

At the 1996 Summer Olympics, Werbrouck won the gold medal in the women's half-heavyweight category.

In January 2007, Werbrouck joined the right-liberal List Dedecker party, newly established by her former trainer Jean-Marie Dedecker. In the June 2007 federal elections, she was elected member of the Belgian Chamber of Representatives (2007–2009). At the 2009 Regional elections she was elected a member of the Flemish Parliament. In 2014, she was no longer up for reelection.
