= Jenny Gal =

Dutch-Italian judoka (born 1969)

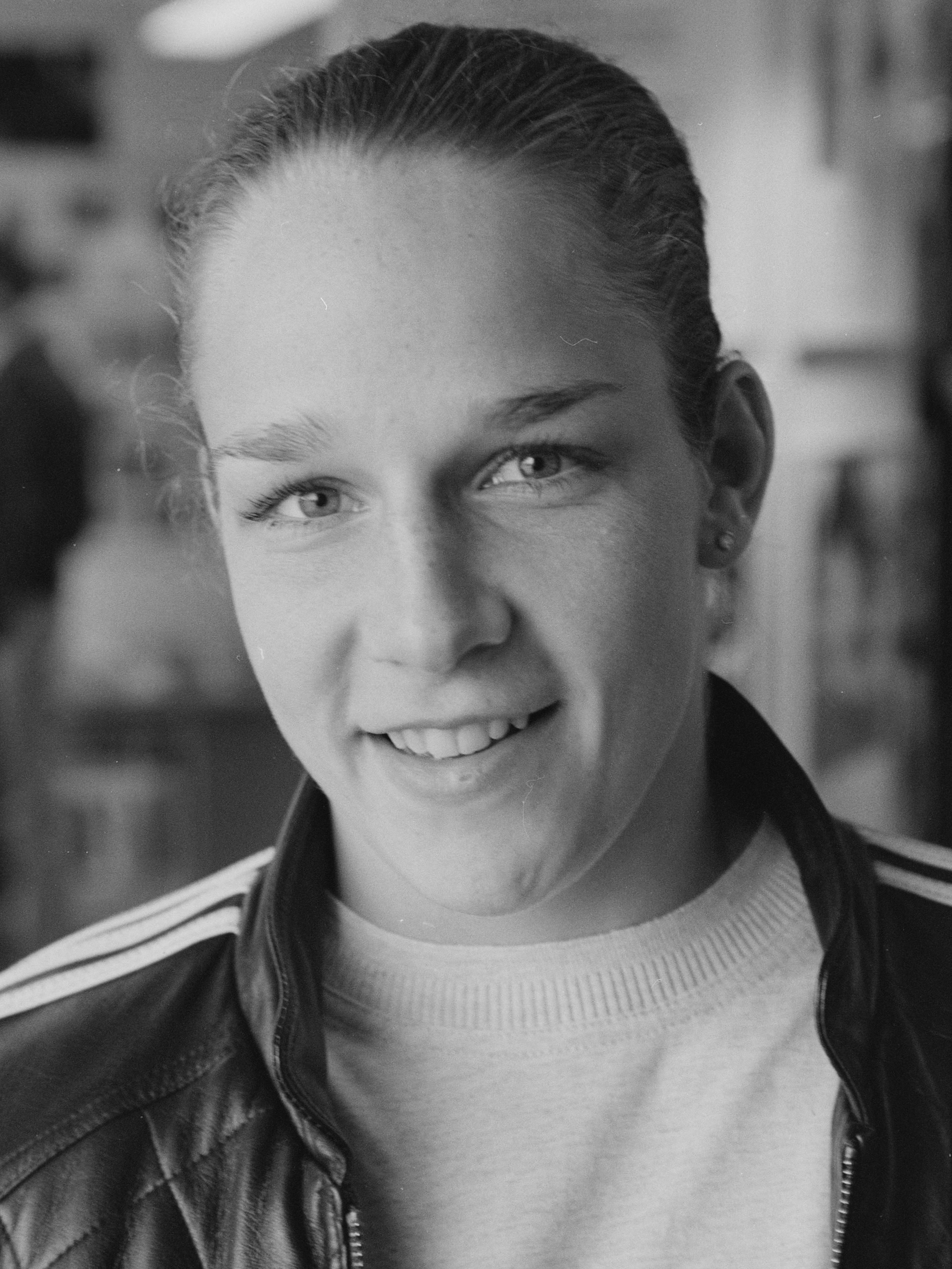
- Gal in 1996

Personal information
- Born: 2 November 1969 (age 56) Uccle, Belgium
- Occupation: Judoka

Sport
- Country: Netherlands
- Sport: Judo
- Weight class: –‍56 kg, –‍61 kg, –‍63 kg

Achievements and titles
- Olympic Games: (bronze) (1996)
- World Champ.: (silver) (1995)
- European Champ.: (gold) (1995)
Medal record
Women's judo
Representing the Netherlands
Olympic Games
Bronze medal – third place	1996 Atlanta	‍–‍61 kg
World Championships
Silver medal – second place	1995 Chiba	‍–‍61 kg
European Championships
Gold medal – first place	1995 Birmingham	‍–‍61 kg
Bronze medal – third place	1988 Pamplona	‍–‍56 kg
Bronze medal – third place	1989 Helsinki	‍–‍56 kg
Bronze medal – third place	1996 The Hague	‍–‍61 kg
European Junior Championships
Gold medal – first place	1986 Leonding	‍–‍56 kg
Representing Italy
European Championships
Silver medal – second place	1999 Bratislava	‍–‍63 kg

Profile at external databases
- IJF: 4450
- JudoInside.com: 34
- Updated on 4 June 2023

Jennifer Eva Caroline Gal (born 2 November 1969) is a retired judoka who competed for The Netherlands at the 1992 and 1996 Summer Olympics and Italy at the 2000 Summer Olympics.

At the 1996 Atlanta Olympic Games she won the bronze medal in the women's half-middleweight division (‍–‍61 kg).

After her marriage to Italian judoka Giorgio Vismara she represented Italy at the 2000 Summer Olympics. She is the older sister of judoka Jessica Gal (born 1971, Amsterdam), who competed in four consecutive Summer Olympics (1988, 1992, 1996, and 2000) for the Netherlands.
