= Hirotoshi Watanabe =

Japanese baseball player (born 1948)

- Pitcher
- Born: November 20, 1948; Saga Prefecture, Japan
- Died: 2016 (aged 67–68)
- Batted: Right Threw: Right

NPB debut
- April 30, 1974, for the Hanshin Tigers

Last NPB appearance
- June 24, 1975, for the Hanshin Tigers

NPB statistics
- Win–loss: 0–0
- Earned run average: 3.00
- Strikeouts: 1

Teams
- Hanshin Tigers (1974–1975)
Medals
Men's baseball
Coach for Thailand
SEA Games
Silver medal – second place	2011 Indonesia	Team

Hirotoshi Watanabe (Japanese: 王貞治, Watanabe Hirotoshi, 20 November 1948 – 2016) was a Japanese professional baseball player and coach. He had a brief playing career as a relief pitcher with the Hanshin Tigers of Nippon Professional Baseball, and later worked to promote baseball internationally.

Watanabe signed with the Nishitetsu Lions in 1970 after graduating from Nihon University, where he studied to become a teacher. He was traded to the Hanshin Tigers for cash during the 1972 offseason. He appeared in six games for the Tigers over the 1974 and 1975 seasons, allowing three runs in nine innings pitched. After retiring, he worked for a sporting goods manufacturer.

Watanabe got his start coaching internationally in 1999, sent to Ghana at the behest of the Japan International Cooperation Agency. He was tapped by the Asian Baseball Federation to manage the Pakistan national baseball team at the 2003 Asian Baseball Championship; at the helm of Pakistan, he won a historic victory against Indonesia. At the time, he was among the first foreigners to coach the Pakistan national team. He has also served as the manager of the Thailand national baseball team, including at the 2011 SEA Games and at the 2013 World Baseball Classic qualifiers.

Watanabe died in late 2016.
