= Yael Arad =

Israeli judoka (born 1967)

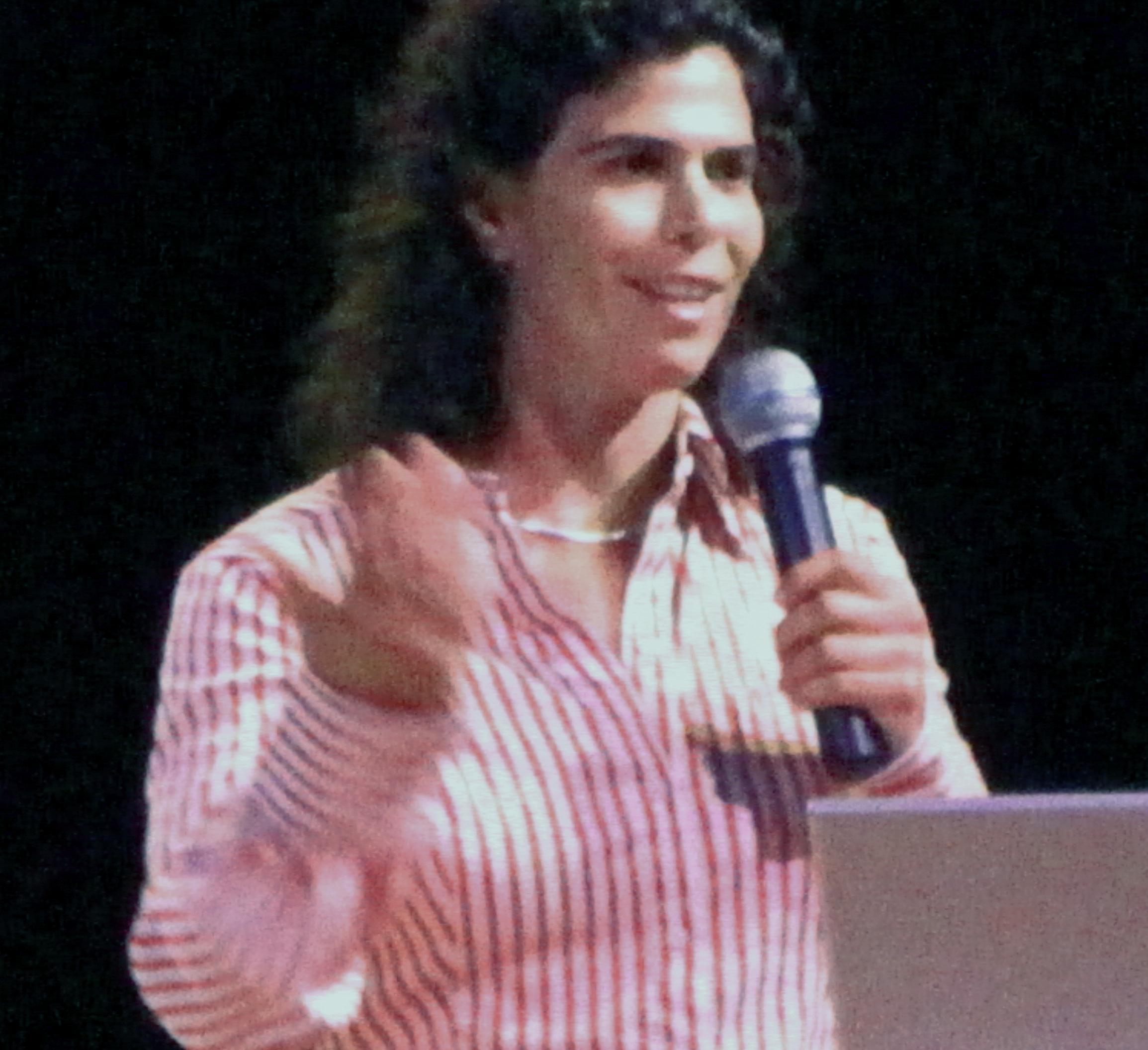
- Yael Arad in 2009

Personal information
- Native name: יעל ארד
- Born: 1 May 1967 (age 59) Tel Aviv, Israel
- Occupations: Chairperson, Olympic Committee of Israel
- Spouse: Lior Kahane (m. 1995)
- Website: www.yaelarad.co.il

Sport
- Country: Israel
- Sport: Judo
- Weight class: ‍–‍61 kg
- Rank: Black belt

Achievements and titles
- Olympic Games: (silver) (1992)
- World Champ.: (silver) (1993)
- European Champ.: (gold) (1993)
Medal record
Women's judo
Representing Israel
Olympic Games
Silver medal – second place	1992 Barcelona	‍–‍61 kg
World Championships
Silver medal – second place	1993 Hamilton	‍–‍61 kg
Bronze medal – third place	1991 Barcelona	‍–‍61 kg
European Championships
Gold medal – first place	1993 Athens	‍–‍61 kg
Bronze medal – third place	1989 Helsinki	‍–‍61 kg
Bronze medal – third place	1991 Prague	‍–‍61 kg

Profile at external databases
- IJF: 53329
- JudoInside.com: 2756
- Updated on 5 June 2023

Yael Arad (Hebrew: יעל ארד; born 1 May 1967) is an Israeli judoka. She was the first Israeli to win an Olympic medal at the 1992 Summer Olympics in Barcelona in 1992. She is widely recognized as one of Israel's most successful athletes and is credited with bringing judo into the athletic mainstream.

After her retirement, Arad developed a career as a businesswoman and CEO. She specializes in entrepreneurship, business development and marketing strategy. She manages the commercial rights of ViacomCBS in Israel. Arad advises companies in various sectors and lectures on excellence in sports, life and business.In 2023, Arad became a member of the International Olympic Committee (IOC).

== Biography ==
Arad, who is Jewish, was born in Tel Aviv, Israel, to Aryeh Arad, a journalist in Davar, Galei Tzahal & Kol Yisrael, and Nurit Arad, a journalist in Yedioth Ahronoth reporting in the field of consumerism. She holds a bachelor's degree in business administration from Reichman University.

== International judo career ==
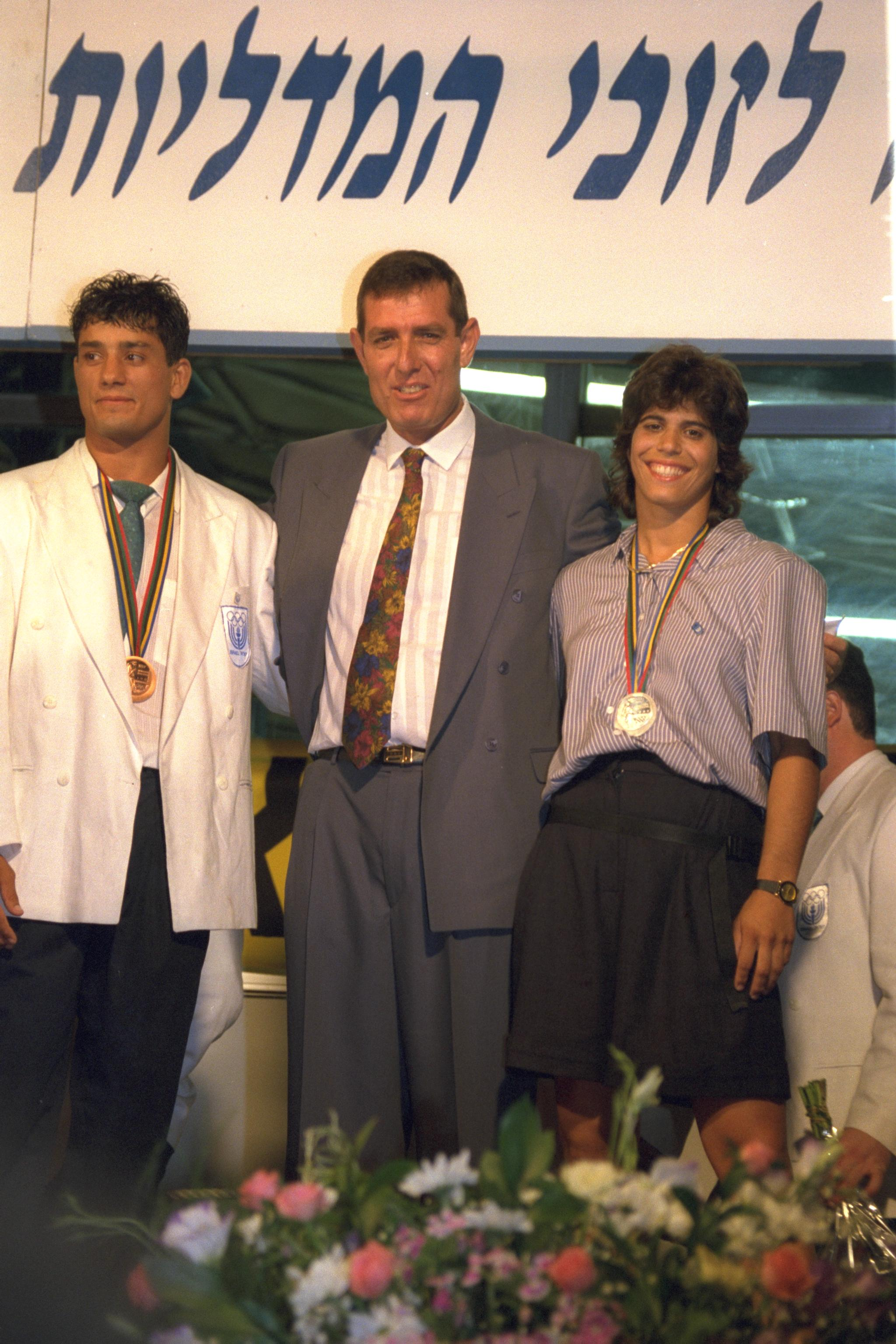
Barcelona Olympic Medalists Oren Smadja and Yael Arad pose with the Deputy Education Minister, M.K. Micha Goldman.

Arad started taking judo classes at the age of eight and within half a year, ranked second in Israel in her weight class. She later trained with the coach of the men's judo team. She won her first international title in 1984 at the age of 17, competing as a middleweight. She came in 7th in the 1984 World Championships in Vienna. She won bronze medals in the European Championships of 1989 and 1991. To hone her skills, she underwent training in Japan.

Arad was the first Israeli athlete to win an Olympic medal when she represented Israel at the 1992 Summer Olympics in Barcelona. She won the silver medal in the women's half middleweight competition. She lost to Catherine Fleury of France. Arad dedicated the medal to the victims of the 1972 Munich Massacre.

In May 1993, Arad won a gold medal in the 1993 European Championships. In the 1993 World Championships, she lost in the finals to Gella Vandecaveye of Belgium, taking home a silver medal.

Arad was chosen to light the torch at the 1993 Maccabiah Games. She finished in fifth place at the 1995 World Championships.

At the 1996 Olympics in Atlanta, Arad lost to Jung Sung-sook of Korea, competing for the bronze. She went into the fight sick with a virus and ended up in fifth place.

Arad served as judo coach for Israel in the 2000 Sydney Olympics, and coached Israeli judoka Olympian Orit Bar-On.

== Retirement ==
After retiring from the sport, Arad continued with judo as a coach and sports entrepreneur. Today she holds a key management position in a children's product company and serves as a TV commentator at judo competitions.

=== Olympic Movement ===
Since 2012, Arad is a member of the Marketing Commission and the Digital & Technology Commission at the International Olympic Committee. In 2013, she became a board member of the Olympic Committee of Israel and Chairwomen of its Sports Commission. In 2021, she was appointed to President of the Olympic Committee of Israel making her the first woman and first Olympic medalist to hold the position. She became a member of the International Olympic Committee in 2023.

== Personal life ==
Arad was married to Lior Kahane (son of Israeli basketball coach Rani Kahane) and she has two children.

== Her book ==
Arad's autobiography called First (Rishona in Hebrew) was released in 2018.

== Awards and honors ==
Arad has won 24 medals during her sporting career in Level A tournaments, including 7 gold medals, 8 silver medals and 9 bronze medals.

In 2004, Arad was chosen to be one of the torchbearers at the Torch-lighting Ceremony (Israel) on Mount Herzl.

In 2018, Arad was awarded the title to "The Athlete of 70'" from the Ministry of Culture and Sport (Israel), marking the 70th anniversary of the founding of Israel.

In 2025, she was awarded the Chairperson’s Award of Excellence from the International Jewish Sports Hall of Fame.

In June 2026, Arad was awarded the Chaim Herzog Presidential Award for Unique Contribution to the State of Israel.

== See also ==
- List of select Jewish judokas
- Sports in Israel
- Women in Israel
