= Detlef Knorrek =

German judoka (born 1965)

Personal information
- Nationality: German
- Born: 6 July 1965 (age 60) Langenhagen, West Germany
- Occupation: Judoka

Sport
- Sport: Judo
Medal record
Men's judo
Goodwill Games
Gold medal – first place	1990 Seattle	-95 kg
Gold medal – first place	1994 Saint Petersburg	-95 kg
European Championships
Bronze medal – third place	1991 Prague	-95 kg
World Military Championships
Bronze medal – third place	1986 Brussels	Open

Profile at external databases
- JudoInside.com: 2168

Detlef Knorrek (born 6 July 1965) is a German judoka. He competed at the 1992 Summer Olympics and the 1996 Summer Olympics. Detlef Knorrek won the Goodwill Games in Seattle in 1990 and 1994. He competed at Olympic Games and won bronze at the European Championships in 1991 in Prague U95kg. Knorrek won the World Cups in Munich, Basel and Rome. Bronze at the TIVP in 1992 and 1993. World team silver in 1994.
