= Alessandra Giungi =

Italian judoka (born 1966)

Personal information
- Born: 5 May 1966 (age 60) Rome, Italy
- Occupation: Judoka

Sport
- Country: Italy
- Sport: Judo
- Weight class: ‍–‍52 kg

Achievements and titles
- Olympic Games: (bronze) (1988)
- World Champ.: (gold) (1991)
- European Champ.: (gold) (1988, 1995)
Medal record
Women's judo
Representing Italy
Olympic Games
Bronze medal – third place	1988 Seoul	‍–‍52 kg
World Championships
Gold medal – first place	1991 Barcelona	‍–‍52 kg
Silver medal – second place	1989 Belgrade	‍–‍52 kg
Bronze medal – third place	1987 Essen	‍–‍52 kg
European Championships
Gold medal – first place	1988 Pamplona	‍–‍52 kg
Gold medal – first place	1995 Birmingham	‍–‍52 kg
Silver medal – second place	1994 Gdansk	‍–‍52 kg
Silver medal – second place	1996 The Hague	‍–‍52 kg
Bronze medal – third place	1987 Paris	‍–‍52 kg
Bronze medal – third place	1991 Prague	‍–‍52 kg
Bronze medal – third place	1992 Paris	‍–‍52 kg
Bronze medal – third place	1993 Athens	‍–‍52 kg

Profile at external databases
- IJF: 7203
- JudoInside.com: 2795
- Updated on 18 June 2023

Alessandra Giungi (born 5 May 1966) is an Italian judoka. She competed at the 1992 Summer Olympics and the 1996 Summer Olympics.
