= Angelique Seriese =

Dutch judoka (born 1968)

Personal information
- Born: 12 July 1968 (age 58)
- Occupation: Judoka

Sport
- Country: Netherlands
- Sport: Judo
- Weight class: +72 kg, Open

Achievements and titles
- Olympic Games: (gold) (1988)
- World Champ.: (gold) (1995)
- European Champ.: (gold) (1988, 1989, 1989, 1992; 1993, 1994, 1995, 1996)
Medal record
Women's judo
Representing the Netherlands
Olympic Games
Gold medal – first place	1988 Seoul	+72 kg
World Championships
Gold medal – first place	1995 Chiba	+72 kg
Silver medal – second place	1993 Hamilton	Open
Bronze medal – third place	1987 Essen	+72 kg
European Championships
Gold medal – first place	1988 Pamplona	+72 kg
Gold medal – first place	1989 Helsinki	+72 kg
Gold medal – first place	1989 Helsinki	Open
Gold medal – first place	1992 Paris	Open
Gold medal – first place	1993 Athens	Open
Gold medal – first place	1994 Gdansk	+72 kg
Gold medal – first place	1995 Birmingham	Open
Gold medal – first place	1996 The Hague	+72 kg
Silver medal – second place	1987 Paris	+72 kg
Bronze medal – third place	1991 Prague	+72 kg

Profile at external databases
- IJF: 53400
- JudoInside.com: 1668
- Updated on 18 June 2023

Angelique Elisabeth Seriese (born 12 July 1968 in Zevenbergen, North Brabant) is a Dutch former judoka, who became world champion in the +72 kg category at the 1995 World Judo Championships.

Seriese won a gold medal in the +72 kg division at the 1988 Summer Olympics when women's judo was introduced as a demonstration sport. Other medals include eight European Championships victories, bronze at the 1987 World Championships in Essen and silver at the 1993 World Championships in Hamilton.

Awards
Preceded by Anky van Grunsven	Dutch Sportswoman of the Year; 1995	Succeeded by Ingrid Haringa
