= Susann Singer =

German judoka

Personal information
- Nationality: German
- Born: 19 January 1970 (age 56) Leipzig, Germany

Sport
- Sport: Judo

Susann Singer (born 19 January 1970) is a German judoka. She competed in the women's half-middleweight event at the 1996 Summer Olympics.
