= Sergei Kosorotov (judoka) =

Russian judoka

Personal information
- Born: 15 April 1965 (age 61)
- Occupation: Judoka

Sport
- Sport: Judo
Medal record
Men's judo
Goodwill Games
Representing Soviet Union
| Gold medal – first place | 1990 Seattle | +95 kg |
World Championships
Representing Soviet Union
| Gold medal – first place | 1991 Barcelona | +95 kg |
Representing Russia
| Silver medal – second place | 1995 Chiba | Open |
| Bronze medal – third place | 1993 Hamilton | +95 kg |
European Championships
Representing Soviet Union
| Gold medal – first place | 1990 Frankfurt | +95 kg |
| Silver medal – second place | 1991 Prague | +95 kg |
| Bronze medal – third place | 1989 Helsinki | Open |
Representing Russia
| Gold medal – first place | 1995 Birmingham | +95 kg |
| Silver medal – second place | 1992 Paris | +95 kg |
| Silver medal – second place | 1996 The Hague | +95 kg |

Profile at external databases
- IJF: 53457
- JudoInside.com: 3358

Sergei Kosorotov (Russian: Серге́й Александрович Косоротов, born 15 April 1965) is a Russian judoka.

== Achievements ==
| Year | Tournament | Place | Weight class |
|---|---|---|---|
| 1997 | World Judo Championships | 5th | Open class |
| 1996 | Olympic Games | 7th | Heavyweight (+95 kg) |
| 1996 | European Judo Championships | 2nd | Heavyweight (+95 kg) |
| 1995 | World Judo Championships | 2nd | Open class |
| 1995 | European Judo Championships | 1st | Heavyweight (+95 kg) |
| 1993 | World Judo Championships | 3rd | Heavyweight (+95 kg) |
| 1993 | European Judo Championships | 7th | Heavyweight (+95 kg) |
| 1992 | European Judo Championships | 2nd | Heavyweight (+95 kg) |
| 1991 | World Judo Championships | 1st | Heavyweight (+95 kg) |
| 1991 | European Judo Championships | 2nd | Heavyweight (+95 kg) |
| 1990 | European Judo Championships | 1st | Heavyweight (+95 kg) |
| 1990 | Goodwill Games | 1st | Heavyweight (+95 kg) |
| 1989 | European Judo Championships | 3rd | Open class |
