= 1991 World Judo Championships =

Judo competition

Judo 1991 World Judo Championships
- Venue: Palau Blaugrana
- Location: Barcelona, Spain
- Dates: 25–28 July 1991
- Competitors: 465 from 64 nations

Competition at external databases
- Links: IJF • JudoInside

The 1991 World Judo Championships were the 17th edition of the World Judo Championships, and were held in Barcelona, Spain from July 25 to July 28, 1991.

== Medal overview ==
=== Men ===
Event	Gold	Silver	Bronze
-60 kg	(Japan) Tadanori Koshino	(South Korea) Yoon Hyun	(Soviet Union) Nazim Huseynov (France) Philippe Pradayrol
-65 kg	(Germany) Udo Quellmalz	(Japan) Masahiko Okuma	(Soviet Union) Sergei Kosmynin (United States) James Pedro
-71 kg	(Japan) Toshihiko Koga	(Spain) Joaquin Ruiz	(South Korea) Chung Hoon (Soviet Union) Vladimir Dgebuadze
-78 kg	(Germany) Daniel Lascau	(Belgium) Johan Laats	(Soviet Union) Bashir Varaev (Japan) Hidehiko Yoshida
-86 kg	(Japan) Hirotaka Okada	(United States) Joe Wanag	(Poland) Waldemar Legień (Italy) Giorgio Vismara
-95 kg	(France) Stéphane Traineau	(Poland) Pawel Nastula	(Germany) Marc Meiling (Czech Republic) Jiri Sosna
+95 kg	(Soviet Union) Sergei Kosorotov	(Cuba) Frank Moreno	(South Korea) Kim Kun-Soo (Japan) Naoya Ogawa
Open	(Japan) Naoya Ogawa	(Soviet Union) David Khakhaleishvili	(Hungary) Imre Csösz (France) Georges Mathonnet

=== Women ===
Event	Gold	Silver	Bronze
-48 kg	(France) Cécile Nowak	(United Kingdom) Karen Briggs	(Japan) Ryoko Tamura (Cuba) Legna Verdecia
-52 kg	(Italy) Alessandra Giungi	(United Kingdom) Sharon Rendle	(Cuba) Maritza Pérez Cárdenas (Japan) Mutsumi Ueda
-56 kg	(Spain) Miriam Blasco	(Belgium) Nicole Flagothier	(United Kingdom) Nicola Fairbrother (China) Li Zhongyun
-61 kg	(Germany) Frauke Eickhoff	(United Kingdom) Diane Bell	(Israel) Yael Arad (France) Catherine Fleury
-66 kg	(Italy) Emanuela Pierantozzi	(Cuba) Odalis Revé	(Japan) Ryoko Fujimoto (United Kingdom) Kate Howey
-72 kg	(South Korea) Kim Mi-jung	(Japan) Yoko Tanabe	(France) Laetitia Meignan (Netherlands) Marion van Dorssen
+72 kg	(South Korea) Moon Ji-yoon	(China) Zhang Ying	(Poland) Beata Maksymow (Netherlands) Monique van der Lee
Open	(China) Zhuang Xiaoyan	(Cuba) Estela Rodriguez Villanueva	(France) Nathalie Lupino (Germany) Claudia Weber

=== Medal table ===
Rank	Nation	Gold	Silver	Bronze	Total
1	Japan	4	2	5	11
2	Germany	3	0	2	5
3	South Korea	2	1	2	5
4	France	2	0	5	7
5	Italy	2	0	1	3
6	Soviet Union	1	1	4	6
7	China	1	1	1	3
8	Spain	1	1	0	2
9	Cuba	0	3	2	5
9	Great Britain	0	3	2	5
11	Belgium	0	2	0	2
12	Poland	0	1	2	3
13	United States	0	1	1	2
14	Netherlands	0	0	2	2
15	Czech Republic	0	0	1	1
15	Hungary	0	0	1	1
15	Israel	0	0	1	1
Totals (17 entries)		16	16	32	64
