= Beata Maksymow =

Polish judoka (1967–2024)

Personal information
- Full name: Beata Elżbieta Maksymow-Wendt
- Born: 27 July 1967 Czeladź, Poland
- Died: 9 June 2024 (aged 56)
- Occupation: Judoka
- Height: 180 cm (5 ft 11 in)
- Weight: 145 kg (320 lb)

Sport
- Country: Poland
- Sport: Judo
Medal record
Women's judo
Representing Poland
World Championships
Gold medal – first place	1993 Hamilton	Open
Gold medal – first place	1999 Birmingham	+78 kg
Bronze medal – third place	1989 Belgrade	+72 kg
Bronze medal – third place	1991 Barcelona	+72 kg
Bronze medal – third place	1997 Paris	+72 kg
European Championships
Gold medal – first place	1986 London	+72 kg
Gold medal – first place	1991 Prague	+72 kg
Gold medal – first place	1997 Ostend	Open
Silver medal – second place	1989 Helsinki	Open
Silver medal – second place	1994 Gdańsk	+72 kg
Silver medal – second place	1995 Trnava	Team
Silver medal – second place	1998 Oviedo	Open
Bronze medal – third place	1985 Landskrona	Open
Bronze medal – third place	1988 Pamplona	Open
Bronze medal – third place	1989 Helsinki	+72 kg
Bronze medal – third place	1993 Athens	+72 kg
Bronze medal – third place	1994 Gdańsk	Open
Bronze medal – third place	1994 The Hague	Team
Bronze medal – third place	1995 Birmingham	+72 kg
Bronze medal – third place	1997 Ostend	+72 kg

Profile at external databases
- IJF: 53186
- JudoInside.com: 1141

Beata Elżbieta Maksymow-Wendt (27 July 1967 – 9 June 2024) was a Polish judoka. She competed at the 1992, 1996 and the 2000 Summer Olympics. She died on 9 June 2024, aged 56.
