= Natalina Lupino =

French judoka (born 1963)

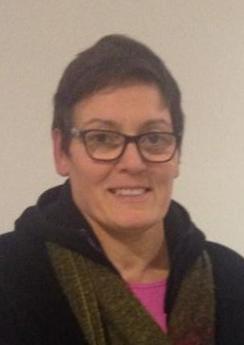
- Lupino in 2018

Personal information
- Born: 13 June 1963 (age 63)
- Occupation: Judoka

Sport
- Country: France
- Sport: Judo
- Weight class: +72 kg, Open

Achievements and titles
- Olympic Games: (bronze) (1992)
- World Champ.: (1982)
- European Champ.: (gold) (1984)
Medal record
Women's judo
Representing France
Olympic Games
Bronze medal – third place	1992 Barcelona	+72 kg
World Championships
Gold medal – first place	1982 Paris	+72 kg
Bronze medal – third place	1984 Vienna	Open
Bronze medal – third place	1989 Belgrade	+72 kg
Bronze medal – third place	1991 Barcelona	Open
European Championships
Gold medal – first place	1984 Pirmasens	Open
Silver medal – second place	1983 Genoa	+72 kg
Silver medal – second place	1984 Pirmasens	+72 kg
Silver medal – second place	1990 Frankfurt	Open
Silver medal – second place	1993 Athens	Open
Bronze medal – third place	1985 Landskrona	‍–‍72 kg
Bronze medal – third place	1989 Helsinki	+72 kg
Bronze medal – third place	1991 Prague	Open
Bronze medal – third place	1992 Paris	Open
Bronze medal – third place	1993 Athens	+72 kg

Profile at external databases
- IJF: 53897
- JudoInside.com: 2540
- Updated on 6 June 2023

Natalina Lupino (born 13 June 1963 in Valenciennes, Nord) is a female retired judoka from France. She claimed a bronze medal in the Women's Heavyweight (+72 kg) division at the 1992 Summer Olympics in Barcelona, Spain. In the bronze medal match she defeated Germany's Claudia Weber.
