= Frauke Eickhoff =

German judoka (born 1967)

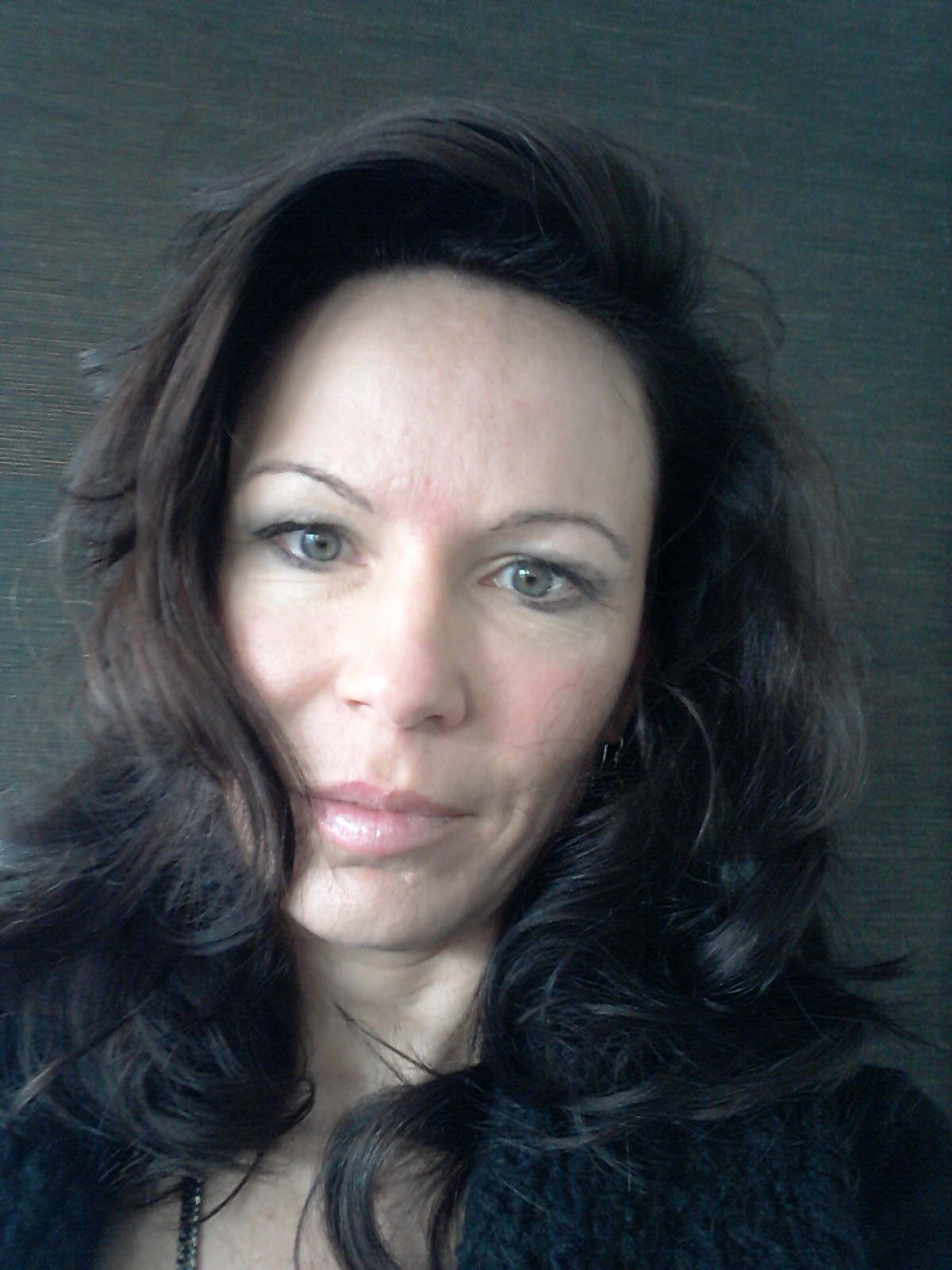
- Frauke-Imke Eickhoff

Personal information
- Born: 24 October 1967 (age 57)
- Occupation: Judoka

Sport
- Sport: Judo

Profile at external databases
- JudoInside.com: 2117

Frauke-Imke Eickhoff (born October 24, 1967) is a German former Olympic judoka.

She was born in Celle, Lower Saxony, West Germany. When she competed in the Olympics, she was 5 feet 4 inches (163 cm) tall and weighed 137 pounds (62 kg).

== Judo career ==
She was affiliated with PSV Braunschweig, Braunschweig, Germany. She won the gold medal in the 1991 World Judo Championships in Barcelona, in the U61 weight class.

Eickhoff competed for Germany at the 1992 Summer Olympics in Barcelona at the age of 24, in judo in the Women's Half-Middleweight (61 kg). She was defeated by Israeli Yael Arad in a match of which the winner was certain to win at least a bronze medal. She finished tied for fifth.
