= 1989 World Judo Championships =

Judo competition

Judo 1989 World Judo Championships
- Venue: Pionir Hall
- Location: (Socialist Federal Republic of Yugoslavia) Belgrade, Yugoslavia
- Dates: 25–28 July 1989
- Competitors: 355 from 63 nations

Competition at external databases
- Links: IJF • JudoInside

The 1989 World Judo Championships were the 16th edition of the World Judo Championships, and were held in the Pionir Hall in Belgrade, Yugoslavia (now Serbia) from October 10–15, 1989.

== Medal overview ==
=== Men ===
Event	Gold	Silver	Bronze
-60 kg	(Soviet Union) Amiran Totikashvili	(Japan) Tadanori Koshino	(Mongolia) Dashgombyn Battulga (South Korea) Yoon Hyun
-65 kg	(Socialist Federal Republic of Yugoslavia) Dragomir Bečanović	(East Germany) Udo Quellmalz	(France) Bruno Carabetta (Soviet Union) Sergei Kosmynin
-71 kg	(Japan) Toshihiko Koga	(United States) Mike Swain	(North Korea) Li Chang-Su (Soviet Union) Georgy Tenadze
-78 kg	(South Korea) Kim Byung-joo	(Japan) Tatsuto Mochida	(Poland) Waldemar Legień (Soviet Union) Bashir Varaev
-86 kg	(France) Fabien Canu	(Netherlands) Ben Spijkers	(Germany) Stefan Freudenberg (East Germany) Axel Lobenstein
-95 kg	(Soviet Union) Koba Kurtanidze	(Mongolia) Odvogiin Baljinnyam	(Germany) Marc Meiling (Belgium) Robert van de Walle
+95 kg	(Japan) Naoya Ogawa	(Cuba) Frank Moreno	(Poland) Rafał Kubacki (Soviet Union) Grigory Verichev
Open	(Japan) Naoya Ogawa	(Soviet Union) Akaki Kibordzalidze	(South Korea) Kim Kun-Soo (Germany) Alexander von der Groeben

=== Women ===
Event	Gold	Silver	Bronze
-48 kg	(United Kingdom) Karen Briggs	(Japan) Fumiko Ezaki	(Netherlands) Jessica Gal (France) Cécile Nowak
-52 kg	(United Kingdom) Sharon Rendle	(Italy) Alessandra Giungi	(South Korea) Cho Min-Sun (Cuba) Maritza Pérez Cárdenas
-56 kg	(France) Catherine Arnaud	(United Kingdom) Ann Hughes	(Spain) Miriam Blasco (South Korea) Jung Sun-Yong
-61 kg	(France) Catherine Fleury	(Soviet Union) Yelena Petrova	(Japan) Takako Kobayashi (Germany) Gabriele Ritschel
-66 kg	(Italy) Emanuela Pierantozzi	(Japan) Hikari Sasaki	(France) Claire Lecat (Cuba) Odalis Revé
-72 kg	(Belgium) Ingrid Berghmans	(Japan) Yoko Tanabe	(France) Aline Batailler (China) Wu Weifeng
+72 kg	(China) Gao Fenglian	(Germany) Regina Sigmund	(France) Nathalie Lupino (Poland) Beata Maksymow
Open	(Cuba) Estela Rodriguez Villanueva	(United Kingdom) Sharon Lee	(Japan) Yoko Tanabe (China) Zhang Ying

=== Medal table ===
Rank	Nation	Gold	Silver	Bronze	Total
1	Japan (JPN)	3	5	2	10
2	France (FRA)	3	0	5	8
3	Soviet Union (URS)	2	2	4	8
4	Great Britain (GBR)	2	2	0	4
5	Cuba (CUB)	1	1	2	4
6	Italy (ITA)	1	1	0	2
7	South Korea (KOR)	1	0	4	5
8	China (CHN)	1	0	2	3
9	Belgium (BEL)	1	0	1	2
10	Yugoslavia (YUG)	1	0	0	1
11	West Germany (FRG)	0	1	4	5
12	East Germany (GDR)	0	1	1	2
12	Mongolia (MGL)	0	1	1	2
12	Netherlands (NED)	0	1	1	2
15	United States (USA)	0	1	0	1
16	Poland (POL)	0	0	3	3
17	North Korea (PRK)	0	0	1	1
17	Spain (ESP)	0	0	1	1
Totals (18 entries)		16	16	32	64
