= Elena Besova =

Russian judoka

Personal information
- Born: 8 July 1966 (age 59)

Sport
- Sport: Judo
Medal record
Representing the Soviet Union
European Championships
| Silver medal – second place | 1990 Frankfurt | -72 kg |

Elena Besova (Russian: Елена Бесова; born 8 July 1966) is a retired Russian judoka who won a silver medal at the 1990 European Championships. She competed in the 1992 Olympics, but was eliminated in the first bout. Later that year she won the Russian championships.
