= Carlos Sotillo =

Spanish judoka

Personal information
- Full name: Carlos Sotillo Martínez
- Born: 18 November 1962 (age 62); Madrid, Spain
- Occupation: Judoka
- Height: 170 cm (5 ft 7 in)
- Weight: 60 kg (132 lb)
- Spouse: Begoña Gómez

Sport
- Country: Spain
- Sport: Judo

Profile at external databases
- JudoInside.com: 5951

Carlos Sotillo Martínez (Note: In this Spanish name, the first or paternal surname is Sotillo and the second or maternal family name is Martínez.) (born 18 November 1962) is a Spanish judoka. He competed at the 1984, 1988 and the 1992 Summer Olympics. He married Spanish Olympic judoka Begoña Gómez.
