= Heidi Goossens =

Belgian judoka

Personal information
- Nationality: Belgian
- Born: 13 April 1969 (age 57) Herentals, Belgium

Sport
- Sport: Judo

Heidi Goossens (born 13 April 1969) is a Belgian judoka. She competed at the 1992 Summer Olympics and the 1996 Summer Olympics.
