= Jana Perlberg =

German judoka

Personal information
- Nationality: German
- Born: 11 January 1966 (age 60) Brandenburg an der Havel, East Germany
- Occupation: Judoka

Sport
- Sport: Judo

Profile at external databases
- JudoInside.com: 2202

Jana Perlberg (born 11 January 1966) is a German judoka. She competed in the women's extra-lightweight event at the 1996 Summer Olympics.
