= Giovanna Tortora =

Italian judoka

Personal information
- Nationality: Italian
- Born: 6 April 1965 (age 61) Acerra, Italy

Sport
- Sport: Judo

Giovanna Tortora (born 6 April 1965) is an Italian former judoka. She competed at the 1992 Summer Olympics and the 1996 Summer Olympics.
