= Giorgio Vismara =

Italian judoka

Personal information
- Nationality: Italian
- Born: 11 January 1965 (age 60); Milan, Italy
- Occupation: Judoka

Sport
- Sport: Judo

Profile at external databases
- JudoInside.com: 469

Giorgio Vismara (born 11 January 1965) is an Italian judoka. He competed in the men's middleweight event at the 1992 Summer Olympics.
