= Jessica Gal =

Dutch judoka (born 1971)

Personal information
- Full name: Jessica Gal
- Nationality: Dutch
- Born: 6 July 1971 (age 55) Amsterdam, Netherlands
- Occupation: Judoka
- Website: www.jessicagal.nl

Sport
- Sport: Judo

Profile at external databases
- JudoInside.com: 72

Jessica Gal (born 6 July 1971) is a Dutch former judoka. She competed at the 1992, 1996 and the 2000 Summer Olympics.
