= Belgium at the 1988 Summer Olympics =

- IOC code: BEL
- NOC: Belgian Olympic and Interfederal Committee
- Website: www.teambelgium.be (in Dutch and French)

in Seoul
- Competitors: 59 (35 men, 24 women) in 16 sports
- Flag bearer: Dirk Crois
- Medals Ranked 44th: Gold 0 Silver 0 Bronze 2 Total 2

Summer Olympics appearances (overview)
- 1900; 1904; 1908; 1912; 1920; 1924; 1928; 1932; 1936; 1948; 1952; 1956; 1960; 1964; 1968; 1972; 1976; 1980; 1984; 1988; 1992; 1996; 2000; 2004; 2008; 2012; 2016; 2020; 2024; 2028

Other related appearances
- 1906 Intercalated Games

Belgium competed at the 1988 Summer Olympics in Seoul, South Korea. 59 competitors, 35 men and 24 women, took part in 65 events in 16 sports.

== Medalists ==
| Medal | Name | Sport | Event | Date |
|---|---|---|---|---|
| Bronze | Frans Peeters | Shooting | Men's Trap | 20 September |
| Bronze | Robert Van de Walle | Judo | Men's 95 kg | 30 September |

== Competitors ==
The following is the list of number of competitors in the Games.

| Sport | Men | Women | Total |
|---|---|---|---|
| Archery | 3 | 0 | 3 |
| Athletics | 7 | 6 | 13 |
| Canoeing | 1 | 1 | 2 |
| Cycling | 4 | 2 | 6 |
| Diving | 1 | 0 | 1 |
| Equestrian | 1 | 0 | 1 |
| Fencing | 2 | 0 | 2 |
| Gymnastics | 0 | 2 | 2 |
| Judo | 4 | – | 4 |
| Rowing | 3 | 5 | 8 |
| Shooting | 4 | 2 | 6 |
| Swimming | 3 | 4 | 7 |
| Synchronized swimming | – | 1 | 1 |
| Table tennis | 1 | 1 | 2 |
| Wrestling | 1 | – | 1 |
| Total | 35 | 24 | 59 |

== Archery ==
In the fifth appearance of Belgium at the Olympic archery contest, the nation returned to sending just men. The three men placed 15th in the team round, with Paul Vermeiren leading the individual rankings with a 17th place.

Men's Individual Competition:

- Paul Vermeiren — Quarterfinals (→ 17th place)
- Patrick DeKoning — Preliminary Round (→ 44th place)
- Francis Noteboom — Preliminary Round (→ 53rd place)

Men's Team Competition:

- Vermeiren, DeKoning, and Noteboom — Preliminary Round (→ 15th place)

== Athletics ==
Men's 3.000m Steeplechase

- William Van Dijck

1. Heat — 8:36.80
2. Semi Final — 8:15.63
3. Final — 8:13.99 (→ 5th place)

Men's 20 km Walk

- Godfried Dejonckheere
  - Final — 1:27:14 (→ 35th place)

Men's 50 km Walk

- Godfried Dejonckheere
  - Final — did not finish (→ no ranking)

Women's Marathon

- Magda Ilands
  - Final — 2:38:02 (→ 35th place)
- Agnes Pardaens
  - Final — did not finish (→ no ranking)

Women's Heptathlon

- Jacqueline Hautenauve
  - Final Result — 5734 points (→ 20th place)

== Cycling ==
Six cyclists, four men and two women, represented Belgium in 1988.

Men's road race

- Jan Mattheus
- Johnny Dauwe
- Frank Francken

Men's sprint

- Erik Schoefs

Women's road race

- Kristel Werckx — 2:00:52 (→ 23rd place)
- Agnes Dusart — 2:00:52 (→ 36th place)

== Diving ==
Men

| Athlete | Event | Preliminary | | Final | |
| Athlete | Event | Points | Rank | Points | Rank |
|---|---|---|---|---|---|
| Tom Lemaire | 3 m springboard | 549.09 | 15 | Did not advance | |
| Tom Lemaire | 10 m platform | 433.68 | 24 | Did not advance | |

== Fencing ==
Two fencers, both men, represented Belgium in 1988.

Men's foil

- Thierry Soumagne

Men's épée

- Stefan Joos
- Thierry Soumagne

== Judo ==
Men

| Athlete | Event | Round of 64 | Round of 32 | Round of 16 | Quarterfinals | Semifinals | Repechage | | | | Final | |
| Athlete | Event | Round of 64 | Round of 32 | Round of 16 | Quarterfinals | Semifinals | Round 1 | Round 2 | Round 3 | Round 4 | Final | |
| Athlete | Event | Opposition Result | Opposition Result | Opposition Result | Opposition Result | Opposition Result | Opposition Result | Opposition Result | Opposition Result | Opposition Result | Opposition Result | Rank |
|---|---|---|---|---|---|---|---|---|---|---|---|---|
| Philip Laats | 65 kg | Pawłowski (POL); L Yuko | Did not advance | | | | Mortensen (DEN); W Ippon | Kostadinov (BUL); W Koka | Cooper (NZL); L Koka | Did not advance | | 7T |
| Johan Laats | 78 kg | Ahn (KOR); L Ippon | Did not advance | | | | | | | | | 34T |
| Luc Suplis | 86 kg | White (GBR); L Yusei-gachi | Did not advance | | | | | | | | | 33T |
| Robert Van de Walle | +95 kg | —N/a | Ha (KOR); W Ippon | Poddubny (URS); W Ippon | Meiling (FRG); L Ippon | Did not advance | —N/a | | Bye | Berland (USA); W Ippon | Beutler (POL); W Ippon | 3rd place, bronze medalist(s) |

== Swimming ==
Men's 100m Freestyle

- Jean-Marie Arnould
  1. Heat – 52.26 (→ did not advance, 34th place)

Men's 200m Freestyle

- Jean-Marie Arnould
  1. Heat – 1:53.73 (→ did not advance, 33rd place)

Men's 400m Freestyle

- Jean-Marie Arnould
  1. Heat – 3:59.91 (→ did not advance, 29th place)

Men's 100m Breaststroke

- Sidney Appelboom
  1. Heat – 1:05.21 (→ did not advance, 33rd place)
- Luc Van de Vondel
  1. Heat – 1:06.24 (→ did not advance, 45th place)

Men's 200m Breaststroke

- Sidney Appelboom
  1. Heat – 2:18.02
  2. B-Final – 2:18.08 (→ 11th place)
- Luc Van de Vondel
  1. Heat – 2:21.50 (→ did not advance, 28th place)

Men's 200m Butterfly

- Jean-Marie Arnould
  1. Heat – 2:03.76 (→ did not advance, 25th place)

Men's 200m Individual Medley

- Sidney Appelboom
  1. Heat – 2:11.50 (→ did not advance, 33rd place)

Women's 200m Freestyle

- Isabelle Arnould
  1. Heat – 2:03.32 (→ did not advance, 18th place)

Women's 400m Freestyle

- Isabelle Arnould
  1. Heat – 4:11.71
  2. Final – 4:11.73 (→ 6th place)
- Christelle Janssens
  1. Heat – 4:19.95 (→ did not advance, 25th place)

Women's 800m Freestyle

- Isabelle Arnould
  1. Heat – 8:34.56
  2. Final – 8:37.47 (→ 7th place)
- Christelle Janssens
  1. Heat – 8:51.22 (→ did not advance, 20th place)

Women's 100m Breaststroke

- Ingrid Lempereur
  1. Heat – 1:11.00
  2. B-Final – 1:10.86 (→ 11th place)
- Brigitte Becue
  1. Heat – 1:12.90 (→ did not advance, 21st place)

Women's 200m Breaststroke

- Ingrid Lempereur
  1. Heat – 2:30.07
  2. Final – 2:29.42 (→ 6th place)
- Brigitte Becue
  1. Heat – 2:33.13
  2. B-Final – 2:34.10 (→ 16th place)

Women's 200m Butterfly

- Isabelle Arnould
  1. Heat – 2:20.74 (→ did not advance, 24th place)

== Synchronized swimming ==
One synchronized swimmer represented Belgium in 1988.

Women's solo

- Patricia Serneels
