= Judo at the 1988 Summer Olympics – Men's 65 kg =

Men's 65 kg at the Games of the XXIV Olympiad
- Venue: Jangchung Gymnasium
- Date: 26 September 1988
- Competitors: 42 from 42 nations

Medalists
1st place, gold medalist(s)		Lee Kyung-keun	South Korea
2nd place, silver medalist(s)		Janusz Pawłowski	Poland
3rd place, bronze medalist(s)		Bruno Carabetta	France
3rd place, bronze medalist(s)		Yōsuke Yamamoto	Japan

The men's 65 kg competition in judo at the 1988 Summer Olympics in Seoul was held on 26 September at the Jangchung Gymnasium. The gold medal was won by Lee Kyung-keun of South Korea.

== Results ==
=== Pool A ===
Round of 64
Mark Adshead (GBR)	E
Ivo Kostadinov (BUL)	YUK
Janusz Pawłowski (POL)	YUK
Philip Laats (BEL)	R
Kamil Sabali (LIB)	E
Driss El-Mamoun (MAR)	IPO
Craig Weldon (CAN)	E
Udo Quellmalz (GDR)	YUK
Joseph Marchal (USA)	WO
Sandeep Byala (IND)	DNS
John Bogie (KEN)	E
Vicente Céspedes (PAR)	HAN

Round of 32
Ivo Kostadinov (BUL)	IPO
Guido Schumacher (FRG)	E
Janusz Pawłowski (POL)	WAZ
Tommy Mortensen (DEN)	R
Driss El-Mamoun (MAR)	YUK
Hussain Safar (KUW)	E
Brent Cooper (NZL)	IPO
Pierre Sène (SEN)	E
Udo Quellmalz (GDR)	E
Yōsuke Yamamoto (JPN)	WAZ
Joseph Marchal (USA)	IPO
Wu Po-chen (TPE)	E
Vicente Céspedes (PAR)	WIP
Leo Sarti (SMR)	E
Pepi Reiter (AUT)	IPO
Stephen Farrugia (MLT)	E

Round of 16
Ivo Kostadinov (BUL)	R
Janusz Pawłowski (POL)	IPO
Driss El-Mamoun (MAR)	E
Brent Cooper (NZL)	IPO
Yōsuke Yamamoto (JPN)	IPO
Joseph Marchal (USA)	E
Vicente Céspedes (PAR)	E
Pepi Reiter (AUT)	IPO

Quarterfinal
Janusz Pawłowski (POL)	KOK
Brent Cooper (NZL)	R
Yōsuke Yamamoto (JPN)	WIP
Pepi Reiter (AUT)	E

Semifinal
Janusz Pawłowski (POL)	IPO
Yōsuke Yamamoto (JPN)	R

=== Pool B ===
Round of 64
Claudio Yafuso (ARG)	IPO
Derrick Anderson (GUM)	E
Drago Bećanović (YUG)	YUS
Meziane Dahmani (ALG)	E
Bruno Carabetta (FRA)	WAZ
Yury Sokolov (URS)	E
Víctor Rivera (PUR)	E
Tamás Bujkó (HUN)	SHI
Mansor Awooda (YAR)	DNS
Au Woon Yiu (HKG)	WO
Pavel Petřikov (TCH)	WIP
Rishiram Pradhan (NEP)	E

Round of 32
Claudio Yafuso (ARG)	KOK
Yavuz Yolcu (TUR)	E
Drago Bećanović (YUG)	R
Lee Kyung-keun (KOR)	IPO
Bruno Carabetta (FRA)	WIP
Luis Fortunato (ANG)	E
Ilias Ioannou (CYP)	E
Majemite Omagbaluwaje (NGR)	WAZ
Tamás Bujkó (HUN)	IPO
Mamadou Keita (MLI)	E
Au Woon Yiu (HKG)	E
Eduardo Landazury (COL)	YUK
Pavel Petřikov (TCH)	KOK
Ricardo Cardoso (BRA)	E
Jamsrangiin Dorjderem (MGL)	IPO
Warren Rosser (AUS)	E

Round of 16
Claudio Yafuso (ARG)	R
Lee Kyung-keun (KOR)	WIP
Bruno Carabetta (FRA)	YUS
Majemite Omagbaluwaje (NGR)	E
Tamás Bujkó (HUN)	IPO
Eduardo Landazury (COL)	E
Pavel Petřikov (TCH)	YUS
Jamsrangiin Dorjderem (MGL)	E

Quarterfinal
Lee Kyung-keun (KOR)	YUS
Bruno Carabetta (FRA)	R
Tamás Bujkó (HUN)	IPO
Pavel Petřikov (TCH)	E

Semifinal
Lee Kyung-keun (KOR)	IPO
Tamás Bujkó (HUN)	R

=== Repechages ===
Repechage
Philip Laats (BEL)	IPO
Tommy Mortensen (DEN)	E

Repechage quarterfinal
Philip Laats (BEL)	KOK
Ivo Kostadinov (BUL)	E

Repechage semifinal
Philip Laats (BEL)	E
Brent Cooper (NZL)	KOK

Repechage final
Brent Cooper (NZL)	E
Yōsuke Yamamoto (JPN)	IPO (bronze)

Repechage

Repechage quarterfinal
Drago Bećanović (YUG)	E
Claudio Yafuso (ARG)	WAZ

Repechage semifinal
Claudio Yafuso (ARG)	E
Bruno Carabetta (FRA)	IPO

Repechage final
Bruno Carabetta (FRA)	IPO (bronze)
Tamás Bujkó (HUN)	E

=== Final ===
Final
Janusz Pawłowski (POL)	2nd place, silver medalist(s)
Lee Kyung-keun (KOR)	YUS (gold)

== Final classification ==
Rank	Judoka	Nation
1st place, gold medalist(s)	Lee Kyung-keun	South Korea
2nd place, silver medalist(s)	Janusz Pawłowski	Poland
3rd place, bronze medalist(s)	Bruno Carabetta	France
3rd place, bronze medalist(s)	Yōsuke Yamamoto	Japan
5T	Tamás Bujkó	Hungary
5T	Brent Cooper	New Zealand
7T	Philip Laats	Belgium
7T	Claudio Yafuso	Argentina
9T	Drago Bećanović	Yugoslavia
9T	Ivo Kostadinov	Bulgaria
11	Tommy Mortensen	Denmark
12T	Pepi Reiter	Austria
12T	Pavel Petřikov	Czechoslovakia
14T	Driss El-Mamoun	Morocco
14T	Joseph Marchal	United States
14T	Vicente Céspedes	Paraguay
14T	Jamsrangiin Dorjderem	Mongolia
14T	Majemite Omagbaluwaje	Nigeria
14T	Eduardo Landazury	Colombia
20T	Guido Schumacher	West Germany
20T	Ricardo Cardoso	Brazil
20T	Hussain Safar	Kuwait
20T	Pierre Sène	Senegal
20T	Udo Quellmalz	East Germany
20T	Wu Po-chen	Chinese Taipei
20T	Leo Sarti	San Marino
20T	Stephen Farrugia	Malta
20T	Yavuz Yolcu	Turkey
20T	Warren Rosser	Australia
20T	Luis Fortunato	Angola
20T	Ilias Ioannou	Cyprus
20T	Mamadou Keita	Mali
20T	Au Woon Yiu	Hong Kong
34T	Mark Adshead	Great Britain
34T	Víctor Rivera	Puerto Rico
34T	Rishiram Pradhan	Nepal
34T	Derrick Anderson	Guam
34T	Meziane Dahmani	Algeria
34T	Yury Sokolov	Soviet Union
34T	Craig Weldon	Canada
34T	John Bogie	Kenya
34T	Kamil Sabali	Lebanon
