= Judo at the 1988 Summer Olympics – Men's 95 kg =

Judo at the Olympics

Men's 95 kg at the Games of the XXIV Olympiad
- Venue: Jangchung Gymnasium
- Date: 30 September 1988
- Competitors: 21 from 21 nations

Medalists
1st place, gold medalist(s)		Aurélio Miguel	Brazil
2nd place, silver medalist(s)		Marc Meiling	West Germany
3rd place, bronze medalist(s)		Dennis Stewart	Great Britain
3rd place, bronze medalist(s)		Robert Van de Walle	Belgium

The men's 95 kg competition in judo at the 1988 Summer Olympics in Seoul was held on 30 September at the Jangchung Gymnasium. The gold medal was won by Aurélio Miguel of Brazil.

== Results ==
=== Pool A ===
Round of 32
Theo Meijer (NED)	IPO
Liu Anpai (CHN)	E
C. Billimoria (IND)	DNS
Jacek Beutler (POL)	WO
Ha Hyeong-ju (KOR)	E
Robert Van de Walle (BEL)	IPO

Round of 16
Theo Meijer (NED)	IPO
Moisés Torres (ANG)	E
Jacek Beutler (POL)	WAZ
Ahmed Barbach (MAR)	E
Robert Van de Walle (BEL)	IPO
Viktor Poddubny (URS)	E
Marc Meiling (FRG)	CHU
Robert Berland (USA)	R

Quarterfinal
Theo Meijer (NED)	E
Jacek Beutler (POL)	IPO
Robert Van de Walle (BEL)	R
Marc Meiling (FRG)	IPO

Semifinal
Jacek Beutler (POL)	R
Marc Meiling (FRG)	CHU

=== Pool B ===
Round of 32
Marko Valev (BUL)	E
Juri Fazi (ITA)	WAZ
Aurélio Miguel (BRA)	YUS
Dennis Stewart (GBR)	R
Stéphane Traineau (FRA)	IPO
Viliame Takayawa (FIJ)	E

Round of 16
Juri Fazi (ITA)	KOK
Joseph Meli (CAN)	E
Aurélio Miguel (BRA)	YUS
Bjarni Friðriksson (ISL)	R
Stéphane Traineau (FRA)	YUK
Hitoshi Sugai (JPN)	E
Jiří Sosna (TCH)	IPO
István Varga (HUN)	E

Quarterfinal
Juri Fazi (ITA)	R
Aurélio Miguel (BRA)	CHU
Stéphane Traineau (FRA)	E
Jiří Sosna (TCH)	YUS

Semifinal
Aurélio Miguel (BRA)	CHU
Jiří Sosna (TCH)	R

=== Repechages ===
Repechage quarterfinal	Repechage semifinal		Repechage final
	Robert Berland (USA)	E
	Robert Van de Walle (BEL)	IPO
			Robert Van de Walle (BEL)	IPO (bronze)
			Jacek Beutler (POL)	E

Repechage quarterfinal		Repechage semifinal		Repechage final
Dennis Stewart (GBR)	WAZ
Bjarni Friðriksson (ISL)	E	Dennis Stewart (GBR)	YUK
		Juri Fazi (ITA)	E
				Dennis Stewart (GBR)	KOK (bronze)
				Jiří Sosna (TCH)	E

=== Final ===
Final
Marc Meiling (FRG)	2nd place, silver medalist(s)
Aurélio Miguel (BRA)	CHU (gold)

== Final classification ==
Rank	Name	Country
1	Aurélio Miguel	Brazil
2	Marc Meiling	West Germany
3T	Dennis Stewart	Great Britain
3T	Robert Van de Walle	Belgium
5T	Jacek Beutler	Poland
5T	Jiří Sosna	Czechoslovakia
7T	Juri Fazi	Italy
7T	Robert Berland	United States
9	Bjarni Friðriksson	Iceland
10T	Theo Meijer	Netherlands
10T	Stéphane Traineau	France
12T	Moisés Torres	Angola
12T	Ahmed Barbach	Morocco
12T	Viktor Poddubny	Soviet Union
12T	István Varga	Hungary
12T	Joseph Meli	Canada
12T	Hitoshi Sugai	Japan
18T	Liu Anpai	China
18T	Ha Hyeong-ju	South Korea
18T	Marko Valev	Bulgaria
18T	Viliame Takayawa	Fiji
