= Judo at the 1986 Goodwill Games =

Judo competition

The Judo competition in the 1986 Goodwill Games were held in Moscow, Soviet Union from 17 to 21 July 1986.

== Medal overview ==
Event	Gold	Silver	Bronze
Extra-lightweight (60 kg)	Mikihiro Mukai (JPN)	Igor Zhuchkov (URS)	Khak Jon-Pak (PRK)
Extra-lightweight (60 kg)	Mikihiro Mukai (JPN)	Igor Zhuchkov (URS)	Raffaele Rennella (ITA)
Half-lightweight (65 kg)	Ali Khamkhoev (URS)	Igor Glyvuk (URS)	Tamás Bujkó (HUN)
Half-lightweight (65 kg)	Ali Khamkhoev (URS)	Igor Glyvuk (URS)	Motohiro Koga (JPN)
Lightweight (71 kg)	Igor Shkarin (URS)	Yury Sokolov (URS)	Wieslaw Blach (POL)
Lightweight (71 kg)	Igor Shkarin (URS)	Yury Sokolov (URS)	Kerrith Brown (GBR)
Half-middleweight (78 kg)	Vladimir Shestakov (URS)	Marcel Pietri (FRA)	Giorgio Vismara (ITA)
Half-middleweight (78 kg)	Vladimir Shestakov (URS)	Marcel Pietri (FRA)	Jambalyn Ganbold (MGL)
Heavyweight (86 kg)	Aleksandr Sivtsov (URS)	Vitali Pesniak (URS)	Francois Fournier (FRA)
Heavyweight (86 kg)	Aleksandr Sivtsov (URS)	Vitali Pesniak (URS)	Roland Borawski (GDR)
Heavyweight (95 kg)	Viktor Poddubny (URS)	Odvogin Baljinnyam (MGL)	Gilles Jaladon (FRA)
Heavyweight (95 kg)	Viktor Poddubny (URS)	Odvogin Baljinnyam (MGL)	Jiri Sosna (TCH)
Heavyweight (+95 kg)	Grigory Verichev (URS)	Steve Cohen (USA)	Andrzej Basik (POL)
Heavyweight (+95 kg)	Grigory Verichev (URS)	Steve Cohen (USA)	Hwang Jae-gil (PRK)
Openweight	Khabil Biktachev (URS)	Andrzej Basik (POL)	Dimitar Zaprianov (BUL)
Openweight	Khabil Biktachev (URS)	Andrzej Basik (POL)	Ryuji Okada (JPN)

=== Medals table ===
Rank	Nation	Gold	Silver	Bronze	Total
1	Soviet Union (URS)	7	4	0	11
2	Japan (JPN)	1	0	2	3
3	France (FRA)	0	1	2	3
3	Poland (POL)	0	1	2	3
5	Mongolia (MGL)	0	1	1	2
6	United States (USA)	0	1	0	1
7	Italy (ITA)	0	0	2	2
7	North Korea (PRK)	0	0	2	2
9	Bulgaria (BUL)	0	0	1	1
9	Czechoslovakia (TCH)	0	0	1	1
9	East Germany (GDR)	0	0	1	1
9	Great Britain (GBR)	0	0	1	1
9	Hungary (HUN)	0	0	1	1
Totals (13 entries)		8	8	16	32
