= Judo at the 1984 Summer Olympics – Men's 95 kg =

Judo at the Olympics

Men's 95 kg at the Games of the XXIII Olympiad
- Venue: California State University, Los Angeles
- Date: 9 August 1984
- Competitors: 22 from 22 nations

Medalists
1st place, gold medalist(s)		Ha Hyung-joo	South Korea
2nd place, silver medalist(s)		Douglas Vieira	Brazil
3rd place, bronze medalist(s)		Bjarni Friðriksson	Iceland
3rd place, bronze medalist(s)		Günther Neureuther	West Germany

The men's 95 kg competition in judo at the 1984 Summer Olympics in Los Angeles was held on 9 August at the California State University. The gold medal was won by Ha Hyung-joo of South Korea.

== Results ==
=== Pool A ===
Round of 32
Douglas Vieira (BRA)	KOK
Alberto Rubio (ESP)	R
Roger Vachon (FRA)	E
Robert Köstenberger (AUT)	YUS
Robert Van de Walle (BEL)	E
Leo White (USA)	MAZ
Fabián Lannutti (ARG)	E
Carsten Jensen (DEN)	IPO

Round of 16
Douglas Vieira (BRA)	SOG
Abdul Daffé (SEN)	R
Robert Köstenberger (AUT)	E
Juri Fazi (ITA)	WIP
Leo White (USA)	IPO
Tareq Al-Ghareeb (KUW)	E
Carsten Jensen (DEN)	E
Bjarni Friðriksson (ISL)	IPO

Quarterfinal
Douglas Vieira (BRA)	YUK
Juri Fazi (ITA)	R
Leo White (USA)	E
Bjarni Friðriksson (ISL)	WAZ

Semifinal
Douglas Vieira (BRA)	YUK
Bjarni Friðriksson (ISL)	R

=== Pool B ===
Round of 32
Viliame Takayawa (FIJ)	E
Günther Neureuther (FRG)	IPO
Metin Orgarun (TUR)	E
Nicholas Kokotaylo (GBR)	IPO
Ha Hyung-joo (KOR)	IPO
John Adams (DOM)	R
Elarabi Eljamali (MAR)	DNS
Mohamed Aly Doukoure (GUI)	DNS

Round of 16
Günther Neureuther (FRG)	KOK
Abdel Majid Senoussi (TUN)	E
Nicholas Kokotaylo (GBR)	WAZ
Essambo Ewane (CMR)	E
Ha Hyung-joo (KOR)	YUK
Joseph Meli (CAN)	R
None	–
Masato Mihara (JPN)	WO

Quarterfinal
Günther Neureuther (FRG)	KOK
Nicholas Kokotaylo (GBR)	R
Ha Hyung-joo (KOR)	WIP
Masato Mihara (JPN)	R

Semifinal
Günther Neureuther (FRG)	R
Ha Hyung-joo (KOR)	YUK

=== Repechages ===
Repechage		Repechage semifinal		Repechage final
Alberto Rubio (ESP)	E
Abdul Daffé (SEN)	YUK	Abdul Daffé (SEN)	E
		Juri Fazi (ITA)	IPO
				Juri Fazi (ITA)
				Bjarni Friðriksson (ISL)	IPO (bronze)

Repechage		Repechage semifinal		Repechage final
John Adams (DOM)	E
Joseph Meli (CAN)	WAZ	Joseph Meli (CAN)	WIP
		Densign White (GBR)	E
				Joseph Meli (CAN)	E
				Günther Neureuther (FRG)	IPO (bronze)

=== Final ===
Final
Douglas Vieira (BRA)	2nd place, silver medalist(s)
Ha Hyung-joo (KOR)	YUS (gold)

== Final classification ==
Rank	Judoka	Nation
1st place, gold medalist(s)	Ha Hyung-joo	South Korea
2nd place, silver medalist(s)	Douglas Vieira	Brazil
3rd place, bronze medalist(s)	Bjarni Friðriksson	Iceland
3rd place, bronze medalist(s)	Günther Neureuther	West Germany
5T	Joseph Meli	Canada
5T	Juri Fazi	Italy
7T	Abdul Daffé	Senegal
7T	Masato Mihara	Japan
9T	John Adams	Dominican Republic
9T	Alberto Rubio	Spain
11T	Leo White	United States
11T	Nicholas Kokotaylo	Great Britain
13T	Essambo Ewane	Cameroon
13T	Robert Köstenberger	Austria
13T	Tareq Al-Ghareeb	Kuwait
13T	Carsten Jensen	Denmark
13T	Abdel Majid Senoussi	Tunisia
18T	Fabián Lannutti	Argentina
18T	Roger Vachon	France
18T	Robert Van de Walle	Belgium
18T	Viliame Takayawa	Fiji
18T	Metin Orgarun	Turkey
