= Dennis Stewart (judoka) =

British judoka (born 1960)

Personal information
- Nationality: British (English)
- Born: 12 May 1960 (age 66) West Bromwich, Staffordshire, England
- Occupation: Judoka

Sport
- Country: Great Britain
- Sport: Judo
- Weight class: ‍–‍95 kg

Achievements and titles
- Olympic Games: (bronze) (1988)
- World Champ.: 7th (1987)
- European Champ.: 5th (1987, 1988)
Medal record
Men's judo
Representing Great Britain
Olympic Games
Bronze medal – third place	1988 Seoul	‍–‍95 kg

Profile at external databases
- IJF: 17056
- JudoInside.com: 5003
- Updated on 18 June 2023

Dennis C. Stewart (born 12 May 1960) is a retired male judoka from Great Britain, who competed at the 1988 Summer Olympics in Seoul, South Korea.

== Judo career ==
Stewart became a four times champion of Great Britain, winning the light-heavyweight division at the British Judo Championships in 1980, 1981, 1982 and 1983. In 1986, he won the bronze medal in the 95 kg weight category at the judo demonstration sport event as part of the 1986 Commonwealth Games.

In 1988, he was selected to represent Great Britain at the 1988 Olympic Games. Competing in the men's half-heavyweight (– 95 kg) division, he won a bronze medal after being defeated in the semi-finals by Brazil's eventual gold medalist Aurélio Miguel.

== Post-retirement ==
After retiring from competition, he established a judo club, and coaches at the GB Judo Centre of Excellence, where he coaches, among others, his sons Max Stewart and Elliot Stewart.
