= Kanokogi =

Kanokogi (written: 鹿子木) is a Japanese surname. Notable people with the surname include:

- Rena Kanokogi (1935–2009), American judoka
- Ryohei Kanokogi, Japanese judoka
- Takeshiro Kanokogi (鹿子木 孟郎, 1874–1941), Japanese painter
- Kanokogi Kazunobu (鹿子木 員信, 1884-1949), Japanese professor
