= Yoshimi Masaki =

Japanese judoka (1962–2026)

Personal information
- Born: August 20, 1962 Tadaoka, Osaka, Japan
- Died: August 30, 2026 (aged 64)
- Occupation: Judoka

Sport
- Sport: Judo
Medal record
Representing Japan
Men's judo
World Championships
Gold medal – first place	1985 Seoul	Open
Asian Games
Gold medal – first place	1986 Seoul	Open
Asian Championships
Gold medal – first place	1984 Kuwait City	Open
Universiade
Gold medal – first place	1985 Kobe	Open

Profile at external databases
- JudoInside.com: 17192

Yoshimi Masaki (正木 嘉美, Masaki Yoshimi; August 20, 1962 – August 30, 2026) was a Japanese judoka and a professor at Tenri University.

== Biography ==
Masaki was born in Tadaoka, Osaka, Japan on August 20, 1962. He began judo during elementary school, and graduated from Tenri Highschool and Tenri University, where he was awarded as an outstanding competitor at the All-Japan Collegiate Judo Championships four times. Yasuhiro Yamashita, Seigo Saito, Yasuyuki Muneta, and Yohei Takai are the only other judoka in history who received the award four times. Masaki continued to work and train at the university after graduating, but was unable to gain a spot on the Japanese national judo team as the third-string competitor behind Yasuhiro Yamashita and Hitoshi Saito. However, when Saito entered in both the +95 kg and Open weight categories of the 1985 World Judo Championships, he was severely injured in the final of the +95 kg competition, forcing him to give up his spot in the Open weight category. Masaki filled in as a last-minute replacement, and defeated Mohamed Rashwan in the final to become world champion in the Open weight category. He continued his success with consecutive wins at the All-Japan Judo Championships from 1986 to 1987, and was scheduled to enter the 1987 World Judo Championships but withdrew due to an injury (his replacement, 19-year-old Naoya Ogawa, went on to win the tournament to become the youngest world champion at the time). Though seen as the favorite to represent Japan in the Open weight category at the 1988 Summer Olympics, Masaki was defeated by Naoya Ogawa and Hitoshi Saito in qualification tournaments and did not make an appearance at the Olympics.

He continued to work for Tenri University after retiring, both as a judo instructor and a professor in sports science. He also worked as an instructor for the All-Japan Judo Federation.

Masaki died on August 30, 2026, at the age of 64.

== See also ==
- List of judoka
