= Yolcu =

Yolcu is a surname of Turkish origin. Notable people with the surname include:

- Mürtüz Yolcu (born 1961), German-Turkish actor and theatre festival founder
- Yavuz Yolcu (born 1966), Turkish judoka
