= Janusz Pawłowski =

Polish judoka (born 1959)

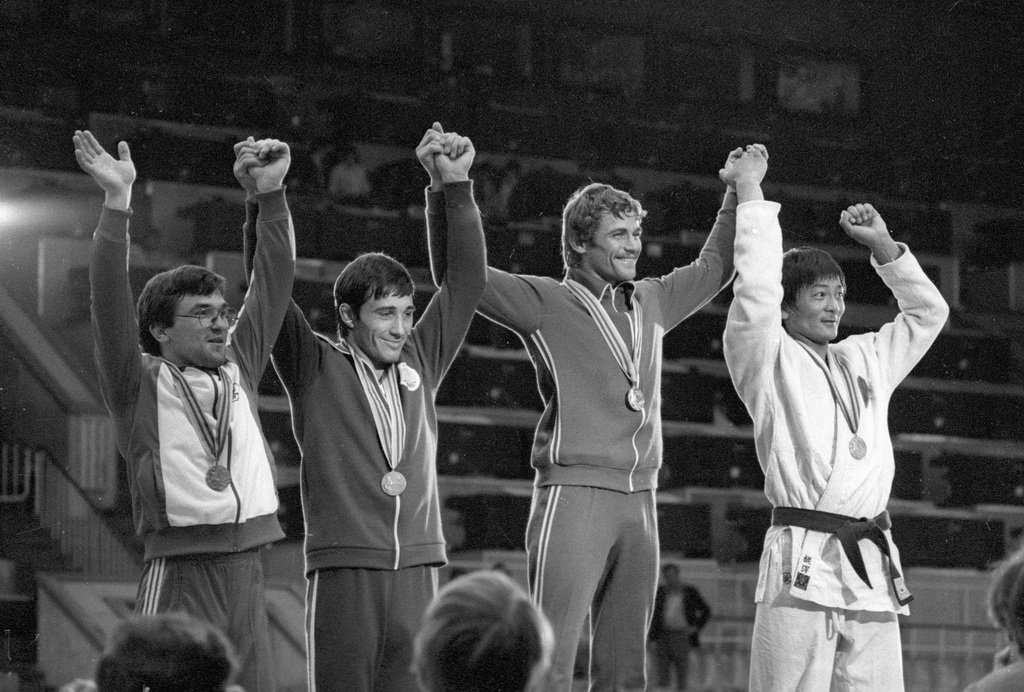
- Janusz Pawłowski (left), bronze medalist at the 1980 Summer Olympics.

Personal information
- Born: 20 July 1959 (age 66)
- Occupation: Judoka

Sport
- Country: Poland
- Sport: Judo
- Weight class: –65 kg
- Rank: 6th dan black belt

Achievements and titles
- Olympic Games: (silver) (1988)
- World Champ.: (bronze) (1979, 1983, 1987)
- European Champ.: (bronze) (1982, 1983, 1986)
Medal record
Men's judo
Representing Poland
Olympic Games
| Silver medal – second place | 1988 Seoul | ‍–‍65 kg |
| Bronze medal – third place | 1980 Moscow | ‍–‍65 kg |
World Championships
| Bronze medal – third place | 1979 Paris | ‍–‍65 kg |
| Bronze medal – third place | 1983 Moscow | ‍–‍65 kg |
| Bronze medal – third place | 1987 Essen | ‍–‍65 kg |
European Championships
| Bronze medal – third place | 1982 Rostock | ‍–‍65 kg |
| Bronze medal – third place | 1983 Paris | ‍–‍65 kg |
| Bronze medal – third place | 1986 Belgrade | ‍–‍65 kg |

Profile at external databases
- IJF: 17891
- JudoInside.com: 1151
- Updated on 6 June 2023

Janusz Pawłowski (born 20 July 1959 in Sopot) is a retired male judoka from Poland. He competed at the 1980 Summer Olympics, and won the bronze medal in the Men's Half-Lightweight (–65 kg) division.

He also competed at the 1988 Summer Olympics in Seoul, South Korea. There he advanced to the final by defeating Japan's 1987 world champion Yosuke Yamamoto in the semi-final and took the silver medal in the Men's Half-Lightweight (–65 kg) division after a match with no point earned by either side. Referees' decision in the final gave the win to South Korea's Lee Kyung-Keun.

After his retirement from competition judo, he had been working as a national coach in Poland, Kuwait, Italy, and Slovenia. Currently, worked as the head judo coach at a private judo club in Turin, Italy. Now he is currently working as Judo Canada's assistant head coach.

On 29 June 2013 he became part of the Polish Sport Hall of Fame and received his own bronze star on the street of Olympic training center in Cetniewo, Poland.

== See also ==
- Judo in Canada
- Judo in Poland
- List of Canadian judoka
