= 1984 World Sambo Championships =

Sambo competition

- Location: Madrid, Spain

The 1984 World Sambo Championships were held in Madrid, Spain in June 1984. Championships were organized by FILA. According to certain sources, women also competed at the event.

== Medal overview ==
men	Gold	Silver	Bronze
-10 kg	(Soviet Union) Khanat Bayshulakov (URS)^{KAZ}	(Bulgaria) Dimitar Dimitrov (BUL)	(Spain) M. Gómez (ESP)
-52 kg	(Soviet Union) Sergey Ternovykh (URS)^{GEO}	(Italy) Angelo Arlandi (ITA)	(Mongolia) Dunkhüügiin Tegshee (MGL)
-57 kg	(Soviet Union) Viktor Astakhov (URS)^{RUS}	(Spain) Miguel Ángel García (ESP)	(Bulgaria) Emil Metodiev (BUL)
-62 kg	(Soviet Union) Yevgeny Yesin (URS)^{RUS}	(Spain) Manuel Jiménez (ESP)	(Mongolia) Jamsrangiin Dorjderem (MGL)
-68 kg	(Mongolia) Galdangiin Jamsran (MGL)	(Bulgaria) Valentin Minev (BUL)	(Soviet Union) Vladimir Panyshin (URS)^{RUS}
-74 kg	(Spain) Ignacio Ordoñez (ESP)	(Mongolia) Jambalyn Ganbold (MGL)	(Soviet Union) Vasily Shvaya (URS)^{RUS}
-82 kg	(Soviet Union) Guram Chertkoyev (URS)^{RUS}	(Mongolia) Zunduyn Delgerdalay (MGL)	(Netherlands) Bert Kops (NED)
-90 kg	(Soviet Union) Viktor Chingin (URS)^{RUS}	(United States) Michael Gatling (USA)	(Mongolia) Dambajavyn Tsend-Ayuush (MGL)
-100 kg	(Soviet Union) Mikhail Baranov (URS)^{BLR}	(Mongolia) Odvogiin Baljinnyam (MGL)	(Italy) Giorgio D'Alessandro (ITA)
+100 kg	(Soviet Union) Vladimir Sobodyrev (URS)^{UZB}	(Mongolia) Sarangereliin Khürelbaatar (MGL)	(Bulgaria) Marin Gerchev (BUL)
