= István Varga =

István Varga may refer to:

- István Varga (handballer) (1943–2014), Hungarian handball player
- István Varga (judoka) (born 1960), Hungarian judoka
- István Varga (politician, born 1956), Hungarian politician and economist
- István Varga (politician, born 1953), Hungarian lawyer and politician
