= Yoko Sakaue =

Japanese judoka (born 1968)

Personal information
- Born: 29 August 1968 (age 57)
- Occupation: Judoka

Sport
- Country: Japan
- Sport: Judo
- Weight class: +72 kg, Open

Achievements and titles
- Olympic Games: (bronze) (1992)
- World Champ.: R32 (1987, 1989)
- Asian Champ.: (silver) (1985)
Medal record
Women's judo
Representing Japan
Olympic Games
Bronze medal – third place	1992 Barcelona	+72 kg
Asian Championships
Silver medal – second place	1985 Tokyo	+72 kg
Bronze medal – third place	1985 Tokyo	Open
Bronze medal – third place	1988 Damascus	Open

Profile at external databases
- IJF: 53905
- JudoInside.com: 10754
- Updated on 6 June 2023

Yoko Sakaue (坂上 洋子, Sakaue Yōko; born 29 August 1968 in Nagasaki) is a female retired judoka from Japan. She claimed a bronze medal in the Women's Heavyweight (+72 kg) division at the 1992 Summer Olympics in Barcelona, Spain. In the bronze medal match she defeated Poland's Beata Maksymowa.
