= Bjarni Friðriksson =

Icelandic judoka (born 1956)

Personal information
- Born: 29 May 1956 (age 70)
- Occupation: Judoka

Sport
- Country: Iceland
- Sport: Judo
- Weight class: –95 kg, Open
- Rank: 8th dan black belt

Achievements and titles
- Olympic Games: (bronze) (1984)
- World Champ.: 7th (1981, 1989)
- European Champ.: 5th (1989)
Medal record
Men's judo
Representing Iceland
Olympic Games
| Bronze medal – third place | 1984 Los Angeles | ‍–‍95 kg |

Profile at external databases
- IJF: 90
- JudoInside.com: 2743
- Updated on 19 June 2023

Bjarni Friðriksson (born 29 May 1956) is a retired Icelandic judoka. At the 1984 Summer Olympics he won the bronze medal in the men's half heavyweight (95 kg) category, together with Günther Neureuther of West Germany. He remains the most successful Icelandic judoka to date. He also competed at the 1980, 1988 and the 1992 Summer Olympics.

== Achievements ==
| Year | Tournament | Place | Weight class |
|---|---|---|---|
| 1990 | European Judo Championships | 7th | Half heavyweight (95 kg) |
| 1989 | World Judo Championships | 7th | Half heavyweight (95 kg) |
| 1989 | European Judo Championships | 5th | Open class |
| 1984 | Olympic Games | 3rd | Half heavyweight (95 kg) |
