= 1981 Asian Judo Championships =

Judo competition

The 1981 Asian Judo Championships were held at Jakarta, Indonesia in July.

== Medal overview ==
=== Men's events ===
Event	Gold	Silver	Bronze
Extra-lightweight (60 kg)	Hatsuyuki Hamada (JPN)	Lai Su-Shan (TPE)	Lee Kyung-Keun (KOR)
Extra-lightweight (60 kg)	Hatsuyuki Hamada (JPN)	Lai Su-Shan (TPE)	Mohammad Ibrahim (KUW)
Half-lightweight (65 kg)	Kyosuke Sahara (JPN)	Tsai De-Wen (TPE)	Hwang Jung-Oh (KOR)
Half-lightweight (65 kg)	Kyosuke Sahara (JPN)	Tsai De-Wen (TPE)	Mohammad Abdul (KUW)
Lightweight (71 kg)	Takahiro Nishida (JPN)	Park Chong-hak (KOR)	Ta (HKG)
Lightweight (71 kg)	Takahiro Nishida (JPN)	Park Chong-hak (KOR)	Chen Tian-Zhang (TPE)
Half-middleweight (78 kg)	Nobutoshi Hikage (JPN)	Ye Hai-Rui (TPE)	Rudi Rapar (INA)
Half-middleweight (78 kg)	Nobutoshi Hikage (JPN)	Ye Hai-Rui (TPE)	Ku (KOR)
Middleweight (86 kg)	Masao Etani (JPN)	Hong (KOR)	Ya Sheng-De (TPE)
Middleweight (86 kg)	Masao Etani (JPN)	Hong (KOR)	Ibrahim Ashour (KUW)
Half-heavyweight (95 kg)	Tsukio Kawahara (JPN)	Ha Hyung-Joo (KOR)	Sun Lang-Xiong (TPE)
Half-heavyweight (95 kg)	Tsukio Kawahara (JPN)	Ha Hyung-Joo (KOR)	Shemmari (KUW)
Heavyweight (+95 kg)	Hitoshi Saito (JPN)	Lu Wen-Jin (TPE)	Kim Ik-Soo (KOR)
Heavyweight (+95 kg)	Hitoshi Saito (JPN)	Lu Wen-Jin (TPE)	Perry Pantauw (INA)
Openweight	Ha Hyoung-Zoo (KOR)	Chang (TPE)	Perry Pantauw (INA)
Openweight	Ha Hyoung-Zoo (KOR)	Chang (TPE)	Isao Matsui (JPN)

=== Women's events ===
Event	Gold	Silver	Bronze
Extra-lightweight (48 kg)	Namiko Hayashi (JPN)	Sheh (TPE)	Muiana Tanto (INA)
Extra-lightweight (48 kg)	Namiko Hayashi (JPN)	Sheh (TPE)	Kong (HKG)
Half-lightweight (52 kg)	Kaori Yamaguchi (JPN)	Shu (TPE)	Rahayu (INA)
Half-lightweight (52 kg)	Kaori Yamaguchi (JPN)	Shu (TPE)	Panganipan (PHI)
Lightweight (56 kg)	Hoi Yiu Leung (HKG)	Michiko Saijo (JPN)	Lilih (TPE)
Lightweight (56 kg)	Hoi Yiu Leung (HKG)	Michiko Saijo (JPN)	Triaututi (INA)
Half-middleweight (61 kg)	Michiko Sasahara (JPN)	Cho (TPE)	Fung (HKG)
Half-middleweight (61 kg)	Michiko Sasahara (JPN)	Cho (TPE)	Padre (INA)
Middleweight (66 kg)	Hiromi Tateishi (JPN)	Elly Amalia (INA)	Lim (TPE)
Middleweight (66 kg)	Hiromi Tateishi (JPN)	Elly Amalia (INA)	none
Half-heavyweight (72 kg)	Jeng (TPE)	Umar Usman (INA)	Hiroyo Sato (JPN)
Half-heavyweight (72 kg)	Jeng (TPE)	Umar Usman (INA)	none
Heavyweight (+72 kg)	Yoriko Kawamura (JPN)	Budiliantono (INA)	Yang (TPE)
Heavyweight (+72 kg)	Yoriko Kawamura (JPN)	Budiliantono (INA)	none
Openweight	Yoriko Kawamura (JPN)	Hoi Yiu Leung (HKG)	Elly Amalia (INA)
Openweight	Yoriko Kawamura (JPN)	Hoi Yiu Leung (HKG)	Nahar (BAN)

=== Medals table ===
Rank	Nation	Gold	Silver	Bronze	Total
1	Japan (JPN)	13	1	2	16
2	Chinese Taipei (TPE)	1	8	6	15
3	South Korea (KOR)	1	3	4	8
4	Hong Kong (HKG)	1	1	3	5
5	Indonesia (INA)	0	3	8	11
6	Kuwait (KUW)	0	0	4	4
7	Bangladesh (BAN)	0	0	1	1
7	Philippines (PHI)	0	0	1	1
Totals (8 entries)		16	16	29	61
