= Yukiharu =

- Pronunciation: jɯkʲihaɾɯ (IPA)
- Gender: Male

Origin
- Origin: Japanese
- Meaning: Different meanings depending on the kanji used

Yukiharu is a masculine Japanese given name.

== Written forms ==
Yukiharu can be written using different combinations of kanji characters. Here are some examples:

- 幸治, "happiness, to manage"
- 幸春, "happiness, spring"
- 幸晴, "happiness, to clear up"
- 幸温, "happiness, to warm up"
- 行治, "to go, to manage"
- 行春, "to go, spring"
- 行晴, "to go, to clear up"
- 行温, "to go, to warm up"
- 之治, "of, to manage"
- 之春, "of, spring"
- 之晴, "of, to clear up"
- 之温, "of, to warm up"
- 志治, "determination, to manage"
- 志春, "determination, spring"
- 雪治, "snow, to manage"
- 恭治, "respectful, to manage"
- 由起治 "reason, to rise, to manage"
- 由紀治 "reason, chronicle, to manage"
- 有紀治 "to have, chronicle, to manage"

The name can also be written in hiragana ゆきはる or katakana ユキハル.

== Notable people with the name ==
- Yukiharu Miki (三木 行治; 1903–1964), Japanese politician
- Yukiharu Oshita (大下 幸治; born 1949), Japanese water polo player
- Yukiharu Yoshitaka (吉鷹 幸春; born 1964), Japanese judoka
