= Bruno Carabetta =

French judoka (born 1966)

Personal information
- Born: 27 July 1966 (age 59) Mulhouse, Haut-Rhin, France
- Occupation: Judoka

Sport
- Country: France
- Sport: Judo
- Weight class: ‍–‍65 kg, ‍–‍71 kg

Achievements and titles
- Olympic Games: (bronze) (1988)
- World Champ.: (bronze) (1989)
- European Champ.: (gold) (1988, 1989, 1990)
Medal record
Men's judo
Representing France
Olympic Games
Bronze medal – third place	1988 Seoul	‍–‍65 kg
World Championships
Bronze medal – third place	1989 Belgrade	‍–‍65 kg
European Championships
Gold medal – first place	1988 Pamplona	‍–‍65 kg
Gold medal – first place	1989 Helsinki	‍–‍65 kg
Gold medal – first place	1990 Frankfurt	‍–‍65 kg
Silver medal – second place	1992 Paris	‍–‍71 kg
World Juniors Championships
Gold medal – first place	1986 Rome	‍–‍65 kg
European Junior Championships
Gold medal – first place	1985 Delemont	‍–‍65 kg
Gold medal – first place	1986 Leonding	‍–‍65 kg

Profile at external databases
- IJF: 53525
- JudoInside.com: 5072
- Updated on 6 June 2023

Bruno Carabetta (born 27 July 1966 in Mulhouse, Haut-Rhin) is a male retired judoka from France, who competed for his native country at the 1988 Summer Olympics in Seoul, South Korea. There he won a bronze medal in the Men's Half-Lightweight (‍–‍65 kg) division after being defeated in the semi-finals by South Korea's eventual gold medalist Lee Kyung-Keun.
