= Douglas Vieira =

Douglas Vieira may refer to:

- Douglas Vieira (judoka)
- Douglas Vieira (footballer)
