= Yosuke Yamamoto =

Yosuke Yamamoto is the name of:

- Yosuke Yamamoto (judoka) (born 1960), Japanese judoka
- Hōmashō Noriyuki (born 1981), Japanese sumo wrestler
