= Ha Hyung-joo =

South Korean judoka (born 1962)

Personal information
- Born: 3 June 1962 (age 64)
- Occupation: Judoka

Korean name
- Hangul: 하형주
- Hanja: 河亨柱
- RR: Ha Hyeongju
- MR: Ha Hyŏngju

Sport
- Country: South Korea
- Sport: Judo
- Weight class: ‍–‍95 kg, +100 kg, Open

Achievements and titles
- Olympic Games: (gold) (1984)
- World Champ.: (silver) (1985)
- Asian Champ.: (gold) (1981, 1984, 1986)
Medal record
Men's judo
Representing South Korea
Olympic Games
| Gold medal – first place | 1984 Los Angeles | ‍–‍95 kg |
World Championships
| Silver medal – second place | 1985 Seoul | ‍–‍95 kg |
| Bronze medal – third place | 1981 Maastricht | ‍–‍95 kg |
| Bronze medal – third place | 1987 Essen | ‍–‍95 kg |
Asian Games
| Gold medal – first place | 1986 Seoul | ‍–‍95 kg |
Asian Championships
| Gold medal – first place | 1981 Jakarta | Open |
| Gold medal – first place | 1984 Kuwait City | +100 kg |
| Silver medal – second place | 1981 Jakarta | ‍–‍95 kg |
| Silver medal – second place | 1984 Kuwait City | ‍–‍95 kg |
Summer Universiade
| Gold medal – first place | 1985 Kobe | ‍–‍95 kg |

Profile at external databases
- IJF: 54170
- JudoInside.com: 6078
- Updated on 19 June 2023

Ha Hyung-joo (born 3 June 1962), also known by Ha Hyoung-zoo, is a retired judoka from South Korea. In 1981, he became the first open division champion to represent South Korea at the Asian Judo Championships in Jakarta. Ha represented South Korea at the 1984 Summer Olympics, and claimed the gold medal in the men's half heavyweight division (‍–‍95 kg) by defeating Brazil's Douglas Vieira in the final. Ha also competed at the 1988 Summer Olympics, but did not win a medal.

Ha retired shortly after the Seoul Olympics and has been working as a physical education professor at Dong-A University.
