= Margaret Castro =

American judoka and trainer

Personal information
- Born: August 22, 1959 (age 66) Manhattan, New York, U.S.
- Occupation: Judoka
- Height: 6 ft 2 in (188 cm)
- Weight: 190 lb (86 kg)

Sport
- Country: United States
- Sport: Judo
- Weight class: +72 kg, Open

Achievements and titles
- Olympic Games: (bronze) (1988)
- World Champ.: (silver) (1982)
- Pan American Champ.: (1985, 1988, 1988)
Medal record
Women's judo
Representing United States
Olympic Games
Bronze medal – third place	1988 Seoul	+72 kg
World Championships
Silver medal – second place	1982 Paris	+72 kg
Bronze medal – third place	1984 Vienna	+72 kg
Bronze medal – third place	1987 Essen	+72 kg
Pan American Games
Gold medal – first place	1983 Caracas	Open
Gold medal – first place	1987 Indianapolis	Open
Silver medal – second place	1987 Indianapolis	+72 kg
Pan American Championships
Gold medal – first place	1985 Havana	+72 kg
Gold medal – first place	1988 Buenos Aires	Open
Gold medal – first place	1988 Buenos Aires	+72 kg

Profile at external databases
- IJF: 53867
- JudoInside.com: 6001
- Updated on June 18, 2023

Margaret "Margie" Castro (born August 22, 1959), also known as Margaret Castro-Gomez, is an American former Olympic-level female judoka.

== Competitive career ==
Castro is rather tall at 6 feet 2 inches (1.88 m) and had a competitive weight of 190 lb. In 1977, at the age of 17, she made history by becoming the youngest woman to win the International Championships. She is an 11-time national champion who competed against the likes of fellow American Maureen Braziel during her competitive career. She won the open weight class but gained silver at the 1987 Pan American Games, losing to Nilmaris Santini. She won three world championships by the time she went to the 1988 Olympics where judo was a demonstration sport and she won a bronze medal in the +72 kg division, coached by Rusty Kanokogi. This ended her competitive career. She was inducted to the USA Judo Hall of Fame.
