= Bogusława Olechnowicz =

Polish judoka (born 1962)

Personal information
- Full name: Bogusława Barbara Olechnowicz-Dzierżak
- Born: 22 November 1962 (age 63) Słupsk, Poland
- Occupation: Judoka

Sport
- Country: Poland
- Sport: Judo
- Weight class: ‍‍–‍61 kg

Achievements and titles
- Olympic Games: (bronze) (1988)
- World Champ.: (bronze) (1987)
- European Champ.: (gold) (1985, 1987, 1992)
Medal record
Women's judo
Representing Poland
Olympic Games
Bronze medal – third place	1988 Seoul	‍–‍61 kg
World Championships
Bronze medal – third place	1987 Essen	‍–‍61 kg
European Championships
Gold medal – first place	1985 Landskrona	‍–‍61 kg
Gold medal – first place	1987 Paris	‍–‍61 kg
Gold medal – first place	1992 Paris	‍–‍61 kg

Profile at external databases
- IJF: 53820
- JudoInside.com: 1149
- Updated on 18 June 2023

Bogusława Barbara Olechnowicz-Dzierżak (born 22 November 1962) is a Polish judoka. She competed in the women's half-middleweight event at the 1992 Summer Olympics.
