= Rena Kanokogi =

American martial artist

Rena "Rusty" Kanokogi

Personal information
- Native name: Rusty Kanokogi; Rena Stewart
- Born: Rena Glickman; July 30, 1935 Brooklyn, New York, United States
- Died: November 21, 2009 (aged 74) Brooklyn, New York, United States
- Occupation: Judoka
- Spouse: Ryohei Kanokogi
- Children: 3

Sport
- Sport: Judo
- Rank: 7th dan black belt

Profile at external databases
- JudoInside.com: 38000

Rena "Rusty" Kanokogi (née Glickman; July 30, 1935 – November 21, 2009) was an American judoka and coach. In 1959, she won a medal at a YMCA judo tournament while disguised as a man, but had to return it after acknowledging that she was a woman. Traveling to Japan to continue her judo training, Kanokogi became the first woman allowed to train in the men's group at the Kodokan. She is perhaps best known for pioneering women's judo competition at the Olympic Games. Kanokogi is often referred to as "The Mother of Women's Judo".

== Early life ==
Kanokogi was born in Brooklyn, New York. Her family home in Coney Island was not a stable one, and she began working in various jobs at the age of seven. In her adolescence, she led a street gang known as the Apaches. Her mother sold hot dogs for a living. In the 1950s, she used her brother's weights for weight training and also worked out on the punching bag at the gymnasium. By the mid-1950s, Kanokogi had married for the first time, taking the name Rena Stewart. She bore a son, Chris Stewart, who would later add his stepfather's surname, Kanokogi, to his own name. Kanokogi and her first husband divorced after a short period of marriage. She was working as a switchboard operator at this time.

In 1955, a male friend showed Kanokogi a judo technique that he had learned, and she immediately became interested in the martial art. Kanokogi recalled that she was attracted to the art because it calmed her down and helped her develop self-control. She learned judo in her local neighborhood and tried to fight in judo competitions, but was barred because she was a woman. She acquired the nickname "Rusty" after a local stray dog.

== Judo career ==
In 1959, Kanokogi competed at the YMCA judo championship in Utica, New York, disguised as a man. Women were not explicitly barred from the competition, but no woman had ever tried to participate before, and there was no place on the tournament application to indicate gender. She had cut her hair short and taped down her breasts. She was an alternate on her team and had to step in when a male member was injured and unable to compete. She won the match against her opponent, and her team went on to win the contest. She was then pulled aside by the tournament organizer, asking her whether she was a woman. She nodded, and was stripped of her medal.

In 1962, with no further options for her development in the US, Kanokogi traveled to the Kodokan Judo Institute in Tokyo, Japan. Women had trained in the Kodokan since 1926, but in separate groups from men. After "pulverizing" the other students in the women's training group, she became the first woman allowed to train in the men's group at the Kodokan. She was promoted to the rank of 2nd dan while at the Kodokan. There, she met her future husband, Ryohei Kanokogi, who held black belt status in judo, karate, and jodo, and was on the Nichidai University judo team. The couple married in 1964 in New York. At the time, he was ranked 5th dan and she was ranked 2nd dan. Kiyoshi Shiina, another judo master, was the best man at the Kanokogis' wedding. Rusty served as the coach for the US Women's National Team in 1976, which included several of the top women in the 1970s: Amy Kublin, Delores Brodie, and Maureen Braziel.

In 1965, Kanokogi directed the first junior judo tournament held in New York: the New York City YMCA Junior Judo Championships. The following year, she directed the New York Women's Invitational Shiai. In 1977, she organized a team of Jewish–American women to compete at the Maccabiah Games in Israel.

In 1980, Kanokogi organized the first women's judo world championship in Madison Square Garden's Felt Forum, sponsoring it through the mortgage of her own home. She was the driving force behind the introduction of women's judo as an exhibition sport at the 1988 Summer Olympics—she had threatened to sue the International Olympic Committee for not accepting women’s judo as an Olympic sport. In 1988, Kanokogi was Coach of the first United States Olympic Women's Judo Team. She would coach her personal student Margaret Castro to a bronze medal at this Olympic Games. In 1991, she was inducted into the International Women's Sports Hall of Fame.

== Later life ==
At the 2004 Summer Olympics in Athens, Kanokogi was a commentator for NBC's coverage of judo. In 2008, she was awarded the Order of the Rising Sun, 4th Class (Gold Rays with Rosette), one of Japan's highest civilian honors. In April 2009, she was inducted into the International Jewish Sports Hall of Fame. In August that year, some 50 years after she had been stripped of her YMCA judo medal, the New York State YMCA awarded her a gold medal to honor her lifetime's work.

Kanokogi died on November 21, 2009, at the Lutheran Medical Center in New York, following a battle with multiple myeloma. She was survived by her husband, children Ted Kanokogi and Jean Kanokogi, and two grandchildren according to one newspaper article, as well as eldest son Chris Stewart Kanokogi and a third grandchild.
