= Warren Rosser =

Australian judoka

Personal information
- Full name: Warren Eric Rosser
- Nationality: Australian
- Born: 2 October 1962 (age 63) New South Wales
- Height: 167 cm (5 ft 6 in)
- Weight: 65 kg (143 lb)

Sport
- Sport: Judo

Warren Eric Rosser (born 2 October 1962) is an Australian judoka. He competed in the men's half-lightweight event at the 1988 Summer Olympics.
