= Claudio Yafuso =

Argentine judoka

Personal information
- Nationality: Argentine
- Born: 21 January 1970 (age 55)

Sport
- Sport: Judo

Claudio Yafuso (born 21 January 1970) is an Argentine judoka. He competed in the men's half-lightweight event at the 1988 Summer Olympics.
