= Amy Kublin =

American judoka (born 1957)

Amy Kublin (born November 2, 1957) is a former competitive judoka for the United States. She won four gold medals in the US National Judo Championships.

== Career ==
Kublin was primarily trained by James Pedro Sr., but for a period was coached by Rusty Kanokogi. She was considered to be a potential Olympian for the United States, but there was no Olympic Games for women in judo at the time. She had a strong seinage throw and a strong ground game.
