= Hikari Yamada =

Japanese judoka (born 1967)

Personal information
- Born: 4 October 1967 (age 58)
- Occupation: Judoka

Sport
- Country: Japan
- Sport: Judo
- Weight class: ‍–‍66 kg

Achievements and titles
- Olympic Games: (gold) (1988)
- World Champ.: (silver) (1989)
- Asian Champ.: (gold) (1985)
Medal record
Women's judo
Representing Japan
Olympic Games
Gold medal – first place	1988 Seoul	‍–‍66 kg
World Championships
Silver medal – second place	1989 Belgrade	‍–‍66 kg
Bronze medal – third place	1987 Essen	‍–‍66 kg
Asian Championships
Gold medal – first place	1985 Kuwait City	‍–‍66 kg

Profile at external databases
- IJF: 53858
- JudoInside.com: 5472
- Updated on 18 June 2023

Hikari Sasaki (佐々木 光, Hikari Yamada; née Sasaki Sasaki (佐々木); born 4 October 1967) is a Japanese judoka. She was born in Numazu, Shizuoka, and started judo at the age of 15. At the 1988 Summer Olympics she won the gold medal in the Women's Middleweight (‍–‍66 kg) category(Women's Judo as a demonstration sport). She also won silver and bronze medals at the 1987 and 1989 World Judo Championships.
