= Liu Anpai =

Chinese judoka

Personal information
- Full name
- Traditional Chinese: 劉安排
- Simplified Chinese: 刘安排
Transcriptions
Standard Mandarin
- Hanyu Pinyin: Liú Ānpái
- Wade–Giles: Liu An-p'ai
Yue: Cantonese
- Jyutping: Lau4 On1 Paai4
- Nationality: Chinese
- Born: 12 February 1966 (age 59) Wafangdian, Dalian, China

Sport
- Sport: Judo

Liu Anpai (simplified Chinese: 刘安排; traditional Chinese: 劉安排; born 12 February 1966) is a Chinese judoka. He competed in the men's half-heavyweight event at the 1988 Summer Olympics. Over the course of his sports career, Liu won 11 judo national championships.

== Biography ==
Liu was born in Wafangdian, Dalian, in 1966. He studied at Wafangdian Longwangmiao Primary School (瓦房店龙王庙小学) and Wafangdian No. 11 Middle School (瓦房店第11中学). Liu was passionate about playing basketball and volleyball during his middle school years. The basketball program at Fuxian Amateur Sports School (复县业余体校) chose him. After enrolling at the school in 1982, he switched to judo and began training under his first judo coach, Chen Shengfu (陈生福). Liu competed in the Liaoning Provincial Judo Championships (辽宁省柔道锦标赛) in 1983, where he placed first in the 86 kg division. He was chosen for the Liaoning Provincial Judo Team (辽宁柔道队) that year.

In 1984 and 1985, Liu competed at the National Youth Judo Championships (全国青年柔道锦标赛), where he placed first in both the 95 kg (209 lb) and openweight divisions. At the inaugural National Youth Games (全国青运会柔道比赛) held in 1985, he received first place in the openweight class. He won first place in the 95 kg weight class at both the National Judo Championships (全国柔道冠军赛) in 1986 and the National Games (全运会柔道比赛) in 1987. Liu received the title "Liaoning Provincial New Long March Commando" (获辽宁省新长征突击手) in 1987. He placed 18th in the men's half-heavyweight event at the 1988 Summer Olympics and was one of five male judo athletes representing China.

Over the course of his sports career, Liu won 11 judo national championships. He lived in the Rixin subdistrict of Xigan in Dalian in 2008.
