= Stephen Farrugia =

Maltese judoka

Personal information
- Nationality: Maltese
- Born: 25 April 1964 (age 60)

Sport
- Sport: Judo

Stephen Farrugia (born 25 April 1964) is a Maltese judoka. He competed in the men's half-lightweight event at the 1988 Summer Olympics.
