= Guido Schumacher =

German judoka

Personal information
- Nationality: German
- Born: 14 December 1965 (age 59); Wermelskirchen, West Germany
- Occupation: Judoka

Sport
- Sport: Judo

Profile at external databases
- JudoInside.com: 4867

Guido Schumacher (born 14 December 1965) is a German judoka. He competed in the men's half-lightweight event at the 1988 Summer Olympics.
