= Judo at the 1986 Asian Games =

Judo competition

- Venue: Saemaul Sports Hall
- Dates: 1–4 October 1986

The Judo competition at the 1986 Asian Games was held at Saemaul Sports Hall from 1 to 4 October 1986 and contested in eight weight classes, for only men. This was the first competition of Judo for Asian Games.

The host nation South Korea dominated the competition winning six out of eight possible gold medals.

== Medalists ==
Event	Gold	Silver	Bronze
Extra lightweight (−60 kg)	Kim Jae-yup; South Korea	Koji Ono; Japan	Zhang Guojun; China
Extra lightweight (−60 kg)	Kim Jae-yup; South Korea	Koji Ono; Japan	Morteza Khodadadi; Iran
Half lightweight (−65 kg)	Lee Kyung-keun; South Korea	Yosuke Yamamoto; Japan	Wang Xiaojie; China
Half lightweight (−65 kg)	Lee Kyung-keun; South Korea	Yosuke Yamamoto; Japan	Sandeep Byala; India
Lightweight (−71 kg)	Ahn Byeong-keun; South Korea	Yukiharu Yoshitaka; Japan	Chong Siao Chin; Hong Kong
Lightweight (−71 kg)	Ahn Byeong-keun; South Korea	Yukiharu Yoshitaka; Japan	Zhu Changhe; China
Half middleweight (−78 kg)	Cho Hyung-soo; South Korea	Tang Haili; China	Marut Techawanit; Thailand
Half middleweight (−78 kg)	Cho Hyung-soo; South Korea	Tang Haili; China	Hisham Al-Sharaf; Kuwait
Middleweight (−86 kg)	Park Kyung-ho; South Korea	Noriyuki Sannohe; Japan	Su Jungen; China
Middleweight (−86 kg)	Park Kyung-ho; South Korea	Noriyuki Sannohe; Japan	Hassabodin Rojanachiva; Thailand
Half heavyweight (−95 kg)	Ha Hyung-joo; South Korea	Hitoshi Sugai; Japan	Cawas Billimoria; India
Half heavyweight (−95 kg)	Ha Hyung-joo; South Korea	Hitoshi Sugai; Japan	Tareq Al-Ghareeb; Kuwait
Heavyweight (+95 kg)	Hitoshi Saito; Japan	Xu Guoqing; China	Kim Ik-soo; South Korea
Heavyweight (+95 kg)	Hitoshi Saito; Japan	Xu Guoqing; China	Shyam Singh Gurjar; India
Openweight	Yoshimi Masaki; Japan	Cho Yong-chul; South Korea	Ding Mingjing; China
Openweight	Yoshimi Masaki; Japan	Cho Yong-chul; South Korea	Bannu Singh; India

== Medal table ==
Rank	Nation	Gold	Silver	Bronze	Total
1	South Korea (KOR)	6	1	1	8
2	Japan (JPN)	2	5	0	7
3	China (CHN)	0	2	5	7
4	India (IND)	0	0	4	4
5	Kuwait (KUW)	0	0	2	2
5	Thailand (THA)	0	0	2	2
7	Hong Kong (HKG)	0	0	1	1
7	Iran (IRN)	0	0	1	1
Totals (8 entries)		8	8	16	32
