= Lynn Roethke =

American judoka

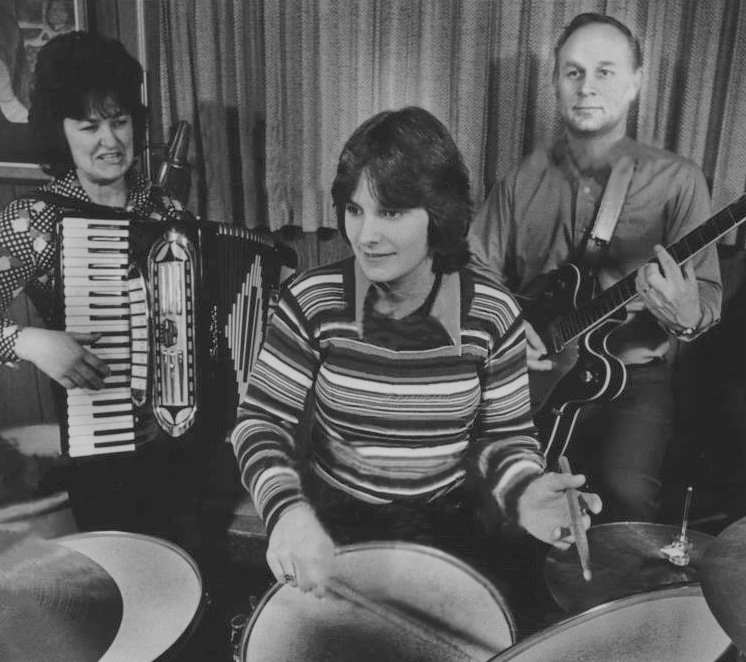
- Roethke with family in 1977

Personal information
- Full name: Lynn Joyce Roethke
- Born: June 22, 1961 (age 65) West Bend, Wisconsin, U.S.
- Education: Marian College
- Occupation: Judoka
- Height: 162 cm (5 ft 4 in)

Sport
- Country: United States
- Sport: Judo
- Weight class: ‍–‍61 kg

Achievements and titles
- Olympic Games: (silver) (1988)
- World Champ.: (silver) (1987)
- Pan American Champ.: (1990)
Medal record
Women's judo
Representing United States
Olympic Games
Silver medal – second place	1988 Seoul	‍–‍61 kg
World Championships
Silver medal – second place	1987 Essen	‍–‍61 kg
Pan American Games
Gold medal – first place	1987 Indianapolis	‍–‍61 kg
Silver medal – second place	1991 Havana	‍–‍61 kg
Pan American Championships
Bronze medal – third place	1990 Caracas	‍–‍61 kg

Profile at external databases
- IJF: 41292
- JudoInside.com: 3593
- Updated on 18 June 2023

Lynn Joyce Roethke (born June 22, 1961) is an American female judoka. Among her most notable accomplishments, Lynn is a two-time Olympic athlete, a Pan American gold medalist, and World Champion Silver medalist. She was the first female to be inducted to the Black Belt Hall of Fame and voted as Olympic Athlete of the Year. She competed in the −61 kg division for most of her competitive career (early 1980s – late 1990s).

== Olympics ==
Roethke is a two-time US Olympic competitor for judo. Lynn competed in the 1988 Summer Olympic Games in Seoul, Korea where she would win the silver medal in the -61 kg (134 lbs) division. This would make her the first American woman to compete in the finals (the gold was won by Diane Bell of GBR). During these Olympics, women's judo was a demonstration sport, therefore did not count towards the USA's total medal count. Lynn was also a member of the Olympic team at the 1992 Summer Olympics in Barcelona, Spain. Lynn is also a Pan American Games Champion in Sambo.

== World Championships ==
Ms. Roethke won the silver medal in the 1987 World Judo Championships in Essen, West Germany. She was defeated by Diane Bell of GBR in the −61 kg division.

== Pan American Games ==
Roethke won the gold medal in the 1987 Pan American Games in Indianapolis. She defeated Natasha Hernandez in the −61 kg division. Ms. Roethke won the silver medal in the 1991 Pan American Games in Havana, Cuba. She was defeated by Illeana Beltran in the −61 kg division.

== US National Championships ==
Roethke won the gold medal during 9 US National Championships.

- 1984 Orlando, FL – defeated Kathy Dalton
- 1985 Farmington Hills, MI – defeated Kathy Dalton
- 1986 Honolulu, HI – defeated Tammy Otaka
- 1987 Pittsburgh, PA – defeated Kathy Dalton
- 1989 Tampa, FL – defeated Liliko Ogasawara
- 1990 San Diego, CA – defeated Brenda Day
- 1991 Honolulu, HI – defeated Brenda Day
- 1993 Indianapolis, IN – defeated Idiko Szasz
- 1994 Irvine, CA – defeated Hannelore Brown in the −56 kg division

Bronze Medal

- 1983 Los Angeles, CA – defeated by Robin Chapman (Judo) for gold, Cindy Sovljanski for silver.
- 1995 Indianapolis, IN – defeated by Corrina Broz for gold, Marissa Pedulla for silver in the −56 kg division
- 2004 Villa Park, IL – defeated by Valerie Gotay for gold, Colleen McDonald for silver in the −56 kg division

== Present ==
Lynn currently owns and operates Club Olympia in Fond du Lac, Wisconsin, where she is a certified trainer and runs her own dojo, Club Olympia Judo. She is an eighth degree black belt.
