= Hitoshi Saito =

Japanese judoka (1961–2015)

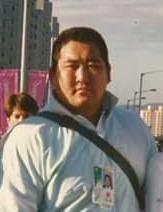
- Saito at the 1988 Summer Olympics

Personal information
- Born: January 2, 1961 Aomori, Japan
- Died: January 20, 2015 (aged 54) Osaka, Japan
- Occupation: Judoka
- Height: 1.80 m (5 ft 11 in)
- Weight: 143 kg (315 lb)

Sport
- Country: Japan
- Sport: Judo
- Weight class: +95 kg, Open
- Rank: 9th dan black belt

Achievements and titles
- Olympic Games: (gold) (1984, 1988)
- World Champ.: (gold) (1983)
- Asian Champ.: (gold) (1981, 1984, 1986)
Medal record
Men's judo
Representing Japan
Olympic Games
Gold medal – first place	1984 Los Angeles	+95 kg
Gold medal – first place	1988 Seoul	+95 kg
World Championships
Gold medal – first place	1983 Moscow	Open
Silver medal – second place	1985 Seoul	+95 kg
Asian Games
Gold medal – first place	1986 Seoul	+95 kg
Asian Championships
Gold medal – first place	1981 Jakarta	+95 kg
Gold medal – first place	1984 Kuwait City	+95 kg

Profile at external databases
- IJF: 1578
- JudoInside.com: 5466
- Updated on June 18, 2023

Hitoshi Saito (斉藤 仁, Saitō Hitoshi; January 2, 1961 – January 20, 2015) was a Japanese judoka who won two consecutive gold medals at the Olympic games.

== Biography ==
Saito began judo in junior high school, and in 1974, he was scouted to transfer to the Kokushikan Junior High School, located in Setagaya, Tokyo. He continued to practice judo at the Kokushikan high school, and won the inter-high school judo group competition during his junior year. He entered Kokushikan University in 1979, and faced Yasuhiro Yamashita a total of 7 times in the finals of the All-Japan Judo Championships, Jigoro Kano Cup, and All-Japan University Judo Championships. He lost to Yamashita in each tournament final, but drew with him several times during other matches. Saito continued to work at Kokushikan University after graduating in 1983, and won the gold medal in the heavyweight (+95 kg) division of the 1984 Summer Olympics and in the open weight division of the 1983 World Judo Championships. In the 1985 World Judo Championships, he faced Cho Yong-Chul of South Korea and was forced to retire from the match after his arm was dislocated by a standing armlock applied by Cho. He also injured his right knee prior to the All-Japan Championships in 1987, but made his return at the 1988 All-Japan Championships, winning the championship for the first time to gain his second trip to the Olympic games. Saito faced Cho Yong-Chul again in the semi-finals of the 1988 Summer Olympics, competing under tremendous pressure after every other Japanese judoka in the 1988 Olympics had been defeated before reaching the finals. He defeated Cho by decision, and won the final against Henry Stöhr to capture his second Olympic gold medal.

Saito retired from competition shortly after his second Olympics as an athlete and became an instructor for Kokushikan University and the All Japan Judo Federation. He also served as a coach for the Japanese judo team during the 2004 Summer Olympics. He was also on friendly terms with his former great rival, Yasuhiro Yamashita. Yamashita was the only judoka who was able to defeat Saito.

Saito is the father of 2022 World Judo Championships silver medalist and 2022 All-Japan open weight champion, Tatsuru Saito.

He died aged 54 from cholangiocarcinoma, a rare but rapidly progressing and incurable form of liver cancer. After his death Saito was promoted by the Kodokan to 9th dan rank in judo and was also awarded the Order of the Rising Sun, Gold Rays with Rosette by the Japanese Emperor.
