= Xu Guoqing =

Chinese judoka (born 1958)

Personal information
- Full name: 徐国清, Pinyin: Xú Guó-qīng
- Nationality: Chinese
- Born: 17 April 1958 (age 68) Donggang, Dandong, Liaoning, China
- Occupation: Judoka

Sport
- Sport: Judo
- Event: +95 kg
Medal record
Men's judo
Representing China
Asian Games
Silver medal – second place	1986 Seoul	+95 kg
World Championships
Bronze medal – third place	1987 Essen	+95 kg
Asian Championships
Silver medal – second place	1988 Damascus	+95 kg

Profile at external databases
- JudoInside.com: 60182

Xu Guoqing (born 17 April 1958) is a Chinese judoka. He competed at the 1984 Summer Olympics and the 1988 Summer Olympics.
