= Abdul Daffé =

Senegalese judoka

Personal information
- Nationality: Senegalese
- Born: 16 June 1962 (age 62)

Sport
- Sport: Judo

Abdul Khadre Daffé (born 16 June 1962) is a Senegalese judoka. He competed in the men's half-heavyweight event at the 1984 Summer Olympics.
