= Fabián Lannutti =

Argentine judoka (born 1964)

Personal information
- Nationality: Argentine
- Born: 28 July 1964 (age 60)

Sport
- Sport: Judo

Fabián Lannutti (born 28 July 1964) is an Argentine judoka. He competed in the men's half-heavyweight event at the 1984 Summer Olympics.
