= Hatsuyuki Hamada =

Japanese judoka

Personal information
- Born: 1 July 1955 (age 71)
- Occupation: Judoka

Sport
- Sport: Judo
Medal record
Representing Japan
Men's Judo
Asian Championships
Gold medal – first place	1981 Jakarta	-60 kg

Profile at external databases
- JudoInside.com: 5370

Hatsuyuki Hamada (濱田 初幸, Hamada Hatsuyuki; born 1 July 1955) is a retired Japanese judoka.

Hamada is from Tsushima, Ehime. He belonged to Ehime Prefectural Police after graduation from Matsuyama University in 1978.

Hamada was good at Seoi nage, Kouchi gari and Newaza. He participated Asian Championships held in Jakarta, Indonesia in 1981 and won a gold medal. He also won a gold medal at Pacific Rim Championships in 1983.

In 1985, Hamada entered Nippon Sport Science University to be a teacher. After graduation in 1987, he coached judo at high-school in Ehime Prefecture and his old school, Matsuyama University.

As of 2010, Hamada has coached judo at National Institute of Fitness and Sports in Kanoya since 2002.

== Achievements ==
- 1976
  - Kodokan Cup (-60 kg) 3rd
- 1977
  - All-Japan Judo Championships (-60 kg) 2nd
- 1978
  - Jigoro Kano Cup (-60 kg) 3rd
  - All-Japan Judo Championships (-60 kg) 2nd
  - Kodokan Cup (-60 kg) 3rd
- 1979
  - Kodokan Cup (-60 kg) 1st
  - All-Japan Judo Championships (-60 kg) 3rd
- 1981
  - Asian Championships (-60 kg) 1st
  - All-Japan Judo Championships (-60 kg) 1st
- 1982
  - Jigoro Kano Cup (-60 kg) 3rd
  - All-Japan Judo Championships (-60 kg) 3rd
  - Kodokan Cup (-60 kg) 3rd
- 1983
  - Pacific Rim Championships (-60 kg) 1st
  - Kodokan Cup (-60 kg) 1st
- 1984
  - All-Japan Judo Championships (-60 kg) 3rd
- 1985
  - All-Japan Judo Championships (-60 kg) 2nd
  - Kodokan Cup (-60 kg) 3rd
