= Aurélio Miguel =

Brazilian judoka and politician

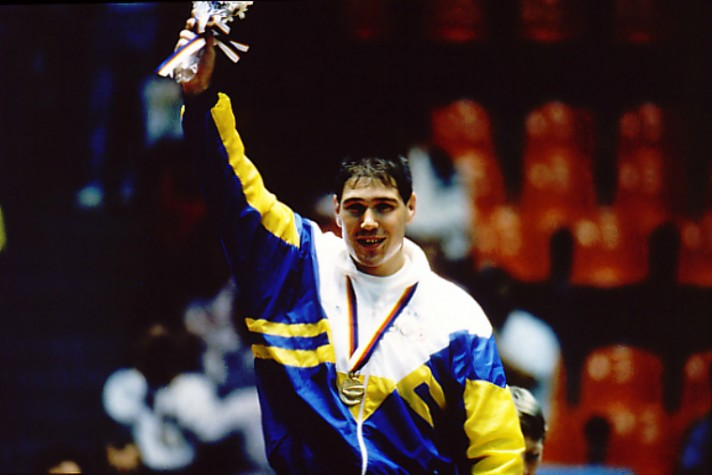
- Aurélio Miguel winning the gold medal at the 1988 Seoul Games

Personal information
- Full name: Aurélio Fernández Miguel
- Born: 10 March 1964 (age 62) São Paulo, SP
- Occupations: Judoka, politician

Sport
- Country: Brazil
- Sport: Judo
- Weight class: ‍–‍95 kg

Achievements and titles
- Olympic Games: (gold) (1988)
- World Champ.: (silver) (1993, 1997)
- Pan American Champ.: (gold) (1982, 1988, 1992, 1996, 1997)
Medal record
Men's judo
Representing Brazil
Olympic Games
Gold medal – first place	1988 Seoul	‍–‍95 kg
Bronze medal – third place	1996 Atlanta	‍–‍95 kg
World Championships
Silver medal – second place	1993 Hamilton	‍–‍95 kg
Silver medal – second place	1997 Paris	‍–‍95 kg
Bronze medal – third place	1987 Essen	‍–‍95 kg
Pan American Games
Gold medal – first place	1987 Indianapolis	‍–‍95 kg
Silver medal – second place	1983 Caracas	‍–‍95 kg
Pan American Championships
Gold medal – first place	1982 Santiago	‍–‍95 kg
Gold medal – first place	1988 Buenos Aires	‍–‍95 kg
Gold medal – first place	1992 Ontario	‍–‍95 kg
Gold medal – first place	1996 San Juan	‍–‍95 kg
Gold medal – first place	1997 Guadalajara	‍–‍95 kg
World Juniors Championships
Gold medal – first place	1983 Mayaguez	‍–‍95 kg
Summer Universiade
Silver medal – second place	1985 Kobe	‍–‍95 kg
Bronze medal – third place	1985 Kobe	Open

Profile at external databases
- IJF: 49419
- JudoInside.com: 3464
- Updated on 4 June 2023

Aurélio Fernández Miguel (born 10 March 1964) is a Brazilian judoka and Olympic champion, and later politician. Among his best sporting achievements are his gold medal at the 1988 Summer Olympics in Seoul, and a bronze medal at the 1996 Summer Olympics in Atlanta.

== Sports career ==
Aurélio Miguel was born on March 10, 1964, in São Paulo. Due to asthma and the insistence of his father, Aurélio Marin, Aurélio Fernández Miguel began training in judo at the age of four years. Initially, Aurélio disliked judo, and as a child, was terrified of the roughness of the competitions and tournaments. As time passed, he became fond of the sport, and eventually won his first title in 1972. Aurélio Miguel then won the Paulista tournament many times, and by the year 1980, he was recognized as the best judoka in the state. Afterwards, Miguel started to compete internationally, winning the silver medal at the 1983 Pan American Games in Caracas, Venezuela. He won the gold medal in the 1987 Pan American Games, again fighting in the under 95 kg category. In 1987 he also won a bronze medal at the World Judo Championships. At the 1988 Summer Olympics in Seoul he became Olympic Champion, winning the -95 kg class by beating Marc Meiling from West Germany in the final. At the 1992 Summer Olympics in Barcelona he placed ninth. He won a silver medal at the 1993 World Judo Championships in Hamilton, losing the final to Hungarian judoka Antal Kovács. At the 1996 Summer Olympics in Atlanta he received a bronze medal, and next year he won a silver medal at the 1997 World Judo Championships in Paris, behind gold winner Pawel Nastula from Poland.

== Political career ==
Aurélio successfully ran for the city council of São Paulo in October 2004, representing the Partido Liberal party, being reelected for a second term in 2008 under the banner of the Republic Party.
