= Delores Brodie =

American judoka

Delores Brodie (born 17 February 1959) is a former competitive judoka for the United States. She won three gold medals, 3 silvers and a bronze in the US National Judo Championships. Delores competed on both the national as well as international circuit. Delores at 17 was the US Junior National Champ in Judo.

== Career ==
Delores was trained by Ernie Smith, and was only in judo for 5 years before she competed nationally and ranked in the top 10 at age 17. She as well as Matt Jesse had an incident with Phil Porter over funds concerning Bingo. Delores competed at 145 lbs in 1978. Delores earned a bronze in the 1978 British Open, coached by Rusty Kanokogi. She was considered to be a potential Olympian for the United States, but there was no Olympic Games for women in judo at the time.
