= Víctor Rivera (judoka) =

Puerto Rican judoka (born 1965)

Personal information
- Nationality: Puerto Rican
- Born: 5 November 1965 (age 59)

Sport
- Sport: Judo

Víctor Rivera (born 5 November 1965) is a Puerto Rican judoka. He competed in the men's half-lightweight event at the 1988 Summer Olympics.
