= Hitoshi Sugai =

Japanese judoka (born 1962)

Personal information
- Born: 29 December 1962 (age 63)
- Occupation: Judoka

Sport
- Sport: Judo
Medal record
Representing Japan
Men's Judo
World Championships
| Gold medal – first place | 1985 Seoul | -95 kg |
| Gold medal – first place | 1987 Essen | -95 kg |
Asian Games
| Silver medal – second place | 1986 Seoul | -95 kg |

Profile at external databases
- JudoInside.com: 5483

Hitoshi Sugai (須貝 等, Sugai Hitoshi; born December 29, 1962 in Furubira, Hokkaidō) is a Japanese judoka.

== Judo career ==
He started Judo at the age of 12.

He won consecutively the 1985 World Judo Championships and 1987 World Judo Championships.

Sugai later participated in the 1988 Summer Olympics in Seoul, but was defeated by Stéphane Traineau (France) in the first round.
