= Mike Swain =

American judoka (born 1960)

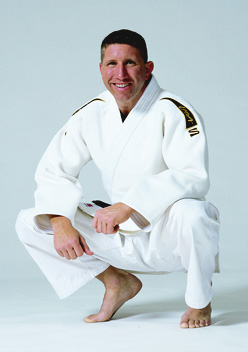

Personal information
- Born: Michael Lee Swain; December 21, 1960 (age 65) Elizabeth, New Jersey, U.S.
- Home town: Campbell, California, U.S.
- Education: San Jose State University
- Occupation: Judoka
- Height: 5 ft 9 in (175 cm)

Sport
- Country: United States
- Sport: Judo
- Weight class: ‍–‍71 kg
- Rank: 6th dan black belt

Achievements and titles
- Olympic Games: (bronze) (1988)
- World Champ.: (gold) (1987)
- Pan American Champ.: (gold) (1986)
Medal record
Men's judo
Representing United States
Olympic Games
Bronze medal – third place	1988 Seoul	‍–‍71 kg
World Championships
Gold medal – first place	1987 Essen	‍–‍71 kg
Silver medal – second place	1985 Seoul	‍–‍71 kg
Silver medal – second place	1989 Belgrade	‍–‍71 kg
Pan American Games
Gold medal – first place	1987 Indianapolis	‍–‍71 kg
Bronze medal – third place	1983 Caracas	‍–‍71 kg
Pan American Championships
Gold medal – first place	1986 Salinas	‍–‍71 kg
Silver medal – second place	1978 Buenos Aires	‍–‍65 kg
Summer Universiade
Bronze medal – third place	1985 Kobe	‍–‍71 kg

Profile at external databases
- IJF: 2966
- JudoInside.com: 6018
- Updated on 6 June 2023

Michael Lee Swain (born December 21, 1960) is an American judoka judoka. He competed in many international competitions and is among the most successful American judokas. He is now the VP of Martial Arts at Dollamur, Sports LP where he develops and sells Martial Arts equipment and continues to be a spokesperson and board member for USA Judo.

== Judo success ==
Swain competed in major international tournaments including four Olympics and five World Championships. He is most known for his historic win in 1987, becoming the first male judoka from the United States to win a World Championship since its inception in 1956. He also won silver at both the 1985 and 1989 World Championships, as well as a gold at the 1987 Pan American Games. He is a four-time Olympian, (Note: The US boycotted the 1980 Olympic Games held in Moscow, USSR. Swain was one of 461 athletes to receive a Congressional Gold Medal years later.) a five-time World team member and was the 1996 US Olympic Judo coach for the Atlanta Games.

== Training and coaching ==
Throughout his professional judo career, he spent much of his time training in Japan at Nihon University and the Tokyo Police Academy. He also trained internationally in Wimbledon, United Kingdom, at the Crystal Palace Training Center with Neil Adams, in Kendal, England at the National Judo Training Center, in Seoul, South Korea, at Yongin University, in Paris, France, at INSEP and, in Cologne, Germany, at the Köln National Judo Training Center. Despite all his travels, Swain continually returned San Jose where he trained under Yoshihiro Uchida, a pioneer for American judo. Swain graduated from San Jose State University in 1985 with a degree in business marketing and continues to this day to coach and bring more students to the program with the Swain Scholarship.

== Honors ==
Swain has been honored for many of his accomplishments as an American judoka. He was named Black Belt Magazine's "competitor of the year" in 1985, as well as Instructor of the year in 1994. In 2003 the USOC honored several athletes who were pioneers in their sports. Swain was honored as a pioneer for USA Judo alongside other athletes such as Evander Holyfield for boxing and Dan Gable for wrestling.

== Business ==
In 1987 he founded Swain Sports. He grew the company to become a successful multimillion-dollar, international business at the heart of the martial arts equipment industry. In 2008 he sold his company to Dollamur and became the VP of the Global Martial Arts Division, where he and the company worked together to develop the next generation Flexi-Roll mat. He is the author of two books Ashiwaza II and Championship Judo, as well as the Co-producer of several martial arts shows like Pro Judo, Pro Tae Kwon Do, and Pro Sumo which all have premiered on ESPN. He is the producer of the DVD series Complete Judo, Basic Judo and Basic Grappling.

== Personal ==
Swain's wife Tania Chie Ishii represented Brazil in the 1992 Summer Olympic Games, and his father-in-law Chiaki Ishii won the bronze medal for Brazil in the 1972 Summer Olympic Games. They live in San Jose with their daughter, Sophia, and a son, Masato, who have grown up doing judo and other sports.
