= Roswitha Hartl =

Austrian judoka (born 1962)

Personal information
- Nationality: Austrian
- Born: 15 September 1962 (age 63) Leoben
- Occupation: Judoka

Sport
- Country: Austria
- Sport: Judo
- Weight class: ‍–‍66 kg
- Club: PSV Leoben
- Coached by: Herbert Weinberger (until 1979); Josef Adam (since 1979)

Achievements and titles
- World Champ.: (bronze) (1988)
- European Champ.: (silver) (1984, 1985, 1986)
Medal record
Women's judo
Representing Austria
Olympic Games
Bronze medal – third place	1988 Seoul	‍–‍66 kg
World Championships
Bronze medal – third place	Essen 1987	‍–‍66 kg
European Championships
Silver medal – second place	Pirmasens 1984	‍–‍66 kg
Silver medal – second place	Landskrona 1985	‍–‍66 kg
Silver medal – second place	London 1986	Open
Bronze medal – third place	Pamplona 1988	‍–‍66 kg

Profile at external databases
- IJF: 53860
- JudoInside.com: 5658

Roswitha Hartl (born 15. September 1962 in Leoben) is an Austrian judoka.

== Judo career ==
Roswitha Hartl fought for the PSV Leoben and was an integral part of the Austrian national team. Her greatest successes were third place at the World Championships in Essen in 1987 and winning the bronze medal in the demonstration competition at the 1988 Summer Olympics.

Hartl is married, has a daughter and works in Leoben.

== Achievements ==
- 1. Rang ASKÖ World Tournament Leonding 1989 –61 kg
- 1. Rang Tournament Fukuoka Japan 1986 –66 kg
- 1. Rang British Open London 1986 –66 kg
- 1. Rang British Open London 1984 –66 kg
- 1. Rang International Zurich Championships 1983 –66 kg
- 2. Rang World Masters Rüsselsheim 1992 –66 kg
- 2. Rang European Championships London 1986 –66 kg
- 2. Rang European Championships Landskrona 1985 –66 kg
- 2. Rang German Open Fürstenfeldbruck 1985 –66 kg
- 2. Rang European Championships Pirmasens 1984 –66 kg
- 2. Rang Tournament Fukuoka Japan 1989 –66 kg
- 3. Rang Tournoi de Paris 1989 –66 kg
- 3. Rang Olympic Games Seoul 1988 –66 kg
- 3. Rang ASKÖ World Tournament Leonding 1988 –66 kg
- 3. Rang European Championships Pamplona 1988 –66 kg
- 3. Rang Tournoi de Paris 1988 –66 kg
- 3. Rang World Championships 1987 Essen –66 kg
- 3. Rang British Open Birmingham 1987 –66 kg
- 3. Rang ASKÖ World Tournament Leonding 1987 –66 kg
- 3. Rang International Tournament Kielce Polish Open 1987 –66 kg
- 3. Rang Dutch Open Nieuwegein 1986 –66 kg
- 3. Rang ASKÖ World Tournament Leonding 1984 –66 kg
- 7. Rang World Championships 1989 Belgrad –66 kg
