= Metin Orgarun =

Turkish judoka (1960–2020)

Personal information
- Nationality: Turkish
- Born: 1 August 1960
- Died: 30 December 2020 (aged 60) İzmir, Turkey

Sport
- Sport: Judo

Metin Orgarun (1 August 1960 – 30 December 2020) was a Turkish judoka. He competed in the men's half-heavyweight event at the 1984 Summer Olympics. A year before the Olympics he won bronze in the +95kg at the Liberation Tournament. He died on 30 December 2020, due to heart attack at the age of 60.
