= Judo at the 1985 Summer Universiade =

Judo competition

Judo Judo at the 1985 Summer Universiade
- Location: Kobe, Japan
- Date: 1985

Medalists
gold medal	South Korea (1st title)
silver medal	Japan
bronze medal	North Korea

Champions
- Men's team: Japan (2nd title)

Competition at external databases
- Links: JudoInside

The Judo competition in the 1985 Summer Universiade were held in Kobe, Japan.

== Medal overview ==
=== Events ===
Event	Gold	Silver	Bronze
Extra-lightweight (60 kg)	Pak Jong-chol (PRK)	Koji Ono (JPN)	Pavel Botev (BUL)
Extra-lightweight (60 kg)	Pak Jong-chol (PRK)	Koji Ono (JPN)	Gheorghe Dani (ROU)
Half-lightweight (65 kg)	Yoon Yong-bal (KOR)	Joe Marchal (USA)	Makoto Sakashita (JPN)
Half-lightweight (65 kg)	Yoon Yong-bal (KOR)	Joe Marchal (USA)	Cornel-Ilie Serban (ROU)
Lightweight (71 kg)	Yukiharu Yoshitaka (JPN)	Mário Tsuitsui (BRA)	Georgi Tenadze (URS)
Lightweight (71 kg)	Yukiharu Yoshitaka (JPN)	Mário Tsuitsui (BRA)	Michael Swain (USA)
Half-middleweight (78 kg)	Cho Hyung-soo (KOR)	Glenn Beauchamp (CAN)	Lo (PRK)
Half-middleweight (78 kg)	Cho Hyung-soo (KOR)	Glenn Beauchamp (CAN)	Sándor Nagysolymosi (HUN)
Middleweight (86 kg)	Viktor Poddubny (URS)	José González (CUB)	Michael Bazynski (GER)
Middleweight (86 kg)	Viktor Poddubny (URS)	José González (CUB)	Lee Chang-soo (PRK)
Half-heavyweight (95 kg)	Ha Hyung-joo (KOR)	Aurélio Miguel (BRA)	Yoshio Haga (JPN)
Half-heavyweight (95 kg)	Ha Hyung-joo (KOR)	Aurélio Miguel (BRA)	Koba Kurtanidze (URS)
Heavyweight (+95 kg)	Hwang Jae-gil (PRK)	Mihail Cioc (ROU)	Naoki Takiyoshi (JPN)
Heavyweight (+95 kg)	Hwang Jae-gil (PRK)	Mihail Cioc (ROU)	Khabil Biktachev (URS)
Openweight	Yoshimi Masaki (JPN)	Xu Guoging (CHN)	Aurélio Miguel (BRA)
Openweight	Yoshimi Masaki (JPN)	Xu Guoging (CHN)	Jochen Plate (GER)
Team	Japan	France	Poland
Team	Japan	France	Soviet Union

=== Medals table ===
Rank	Nation	Gold	Silver	Bronze	Total
1	South Korea (KOR)	3	0	0	3
2	Japan (JPN)	2	1	3	6
3	North Korea (PRK)	2	0	2	4
4	Soviet Union (URS)	1	0	3	4
5	Brazil (BRA)	0	2	1	3
6	Romania (ROU)	0	1	2	3
7	United States (USA)	0	1	1	2
8	Canada (CAN)	0	1	0	1
8	China (CHN)	0	1	0	1
8	Cuba (CUB)	0	1	0	1
11	West Germany (FRG)	0	0	2	2
12	Bulgaria (BUL)	0	0	1	1
12	Hungary (HUN)	0	0	1	1
Totals (13 entries)		8	8	16	32
