= 1985 Asian Judo Championships =

Judo competition

The 1985 Asian Judo Championships were held in Tokyo, Japan in March.

== Medal overview ==
=== Women's events ===
Event	Gold	Silver	Bronze
Extra-lightweight (48 kg)	Li Aiyue (CHN)	Hitomi Nakahara (JPN)	Hou (TPE)
Extra-lightweight (48 kg)	Li Aiyue (CHN)	Hitomi Nakahara (JPN)	Kwong (HKG)
Half-lightweight (52 kg)	Kaori Yamaguchi (JPN)	Ding (TPE)	Lo (HKG)
Half-lightweight (52 kg)	Kaori Yamaguchi (JPN)	Ding (TPE)	Zang (CHN)
Lightweight (56 kg)	Li Zhongyun (CHN)	Ching (TPE)	Satsuki Watabe (JPN)
Lightweight (56 kg)	Li Zhongyun (CHN)	Ching (TPE)	Thant (MYA)
Half-middleweight (61 kg)	Kaori Hachinohe (JPN)	Cheng (TPE)	Li Ji-hye (KOR)
Half-middleweight (61 kg)	Kaori Hachinohe (JPN)	Cheng (TPE)	Wang (CHN)
Middleweight (66 kg)	Hikari Sasaki (JPN)	Liu (CHN)	Kang Myeong-suk (KOR)
Middleweight (66 kg)	Hikari Sasaki (JPN)	Liu (CHN)	Huang (TPE)
Half-heavyweight (72 kg)	Kotomi Kurokawa (JPN)	Shi (CHN)	Yang (TPE)
Half-heavyweight (72 kg)	Kotomi Kurokawa (JPN)	Shi (CHN)	Byun Sang-gyeong (KOR)
Heavyweight (+72 kg)	Gao Fenglian (CHN)	Yoko Sakaue (JPN)	Ling (TPE)
Heavyweight (+72 kg)	Gao Fenglian (CHN)	Yoko Sakaue (JPN)	Kandi (INA)
Openweight	Gao Fenglian (CHN)	You (TPE)	O Gwi-ja (KOR)
Openweight	Gao Fenglian (CHN)	You (TPE)	Yoko Sakaue (JPN)

=== Medals table ===
Rank	Nation	Gold	Silver	Bronze	Total
1	China (CHN)	4	2	2	8
1	Japan (JPN)	4	2	2	8
3	Chinese Taipei (TPE)	0	4	4	8
4	South Korea (KOR)	0	0	4	4
5	Hong Kong (HKG)	0	0	2	2
6	Indonesia (INA)	0	0	1	1
6	Myanmar (MYA)	0	0	1	1
Totals (7 entries)		8	8	16	32
