= Driss El-Mamoun =

Moroccan judoka

Personal information
- Nationality: Moroccan
- Born: 1962 (age 62–63)

Sport
- Sport: Judo

Driss El-Mamoun (born 1962) is a Moroccan judoka. He competed in the men's half-lightweight event at the 1988 Summer Olympics.
