= Wu Po-chen =

Taiwanese judoka

Personal information
- Full name: 吳 博誠, Pinyin: Wú Bó-chéng
- Nationality: Taiwanese
- Born: 23 July 1966 (age 58)

Sport
- Sport: Judo

Wu Po-chen (born 23 July 1966) is a Taiwanese judoka. He competed in the men's half-lightweight event at the 1988 Summer Olympics.
