= Kaori Yamaguchi =

Japanese judoka (born 1964)

Personal information
- Born: 28 December 1964 (age 61) Toshima, Tokyo, Japan
- Occupation: Judoka

Sport
- Country: Japan
- Sport: Judo
- Weight class: ‍–‍52 kg

Achievements and titles
- Olympic Games: (bronze) (1988)
- World Champ.: (1984)
- Asian Champ.: (gold) (1981, 1985)
Medal record
Women's judo
Representing Japan
Olympic Games
Bronze medal – third place	1988 Seoul	‍–‍52 kg
World Championships
Gold medal – first place	1984 Vienna	‍–‍52 kg
Silver medal – second place	1980 New York	‍–‍52 kg
Silver medal – second place	1982 Paris	‍–‍52 kg
Silver medal – second place	1986 Maastricht	‍–‍52 kg
Silver medal – second place	1987 Essen	‍–‍52 kg
Asian Championships
Gold medal – first place	1981 Jakarta	‍–‍52 kg
Gold medal – first place	1985 Kuwait City	‍–‍52 kg

Profile at external databases
- IJF: 5998
- JudoInside.com: 5504
- Updated on 18 June 2023

Kaori Yamaguchi (山口香, Yamaguchi Kaori; born 28 December 1964) is a Japanese university professor and retired judoka.

Yamaguchi won the All-Japan Judo Championships 10 consecutive times from 1978 to 1987 (twice in the ‍–‍50 kg division, seven times in the ‍–‍52 kg division) and won her first medal at the 1980 World Judo Championships. Yamaguchi went on to win 4 silver medals and one gold medal at the World Judo Championships. Yamaguchi also won a bronze medal in the ‍–‍52 kg division at the 1988 Summer Olympics in Seoul, where women's judo was held as a demonstration sport. She retired from competitive judo in 1989 when she graduated from the University of Tsukuba. She worked as an instructor for the University of Tsukuba and Musashi University since retiring. Yamaguchi is currently Associate professor of Tsukuba.

Yamaguchi is the model for the protagonist in Naoki Urasawa's judo manga, Yawara! A Fashionable Judo Girl, and makes a cameo appearance in the film version of the manga as well.

== See also ==
- List of judoka
- List of Olympic medalists in judo
