= Eduardo Landazury =

Colombian judoka (born 1966)

Personal information
- Nationality: Colombian
- Born: 17 April 1966 (age 59)

Sport
- Sport: Judo

Eduardo Landazury (born 17 April 1966) is a Colombian judoka. He competed in the men's half-lightweight event at the 1988 Summer Olympics.
