= Tareq Al-Ghareeb =

Kuwaiti judoka (born 1961)

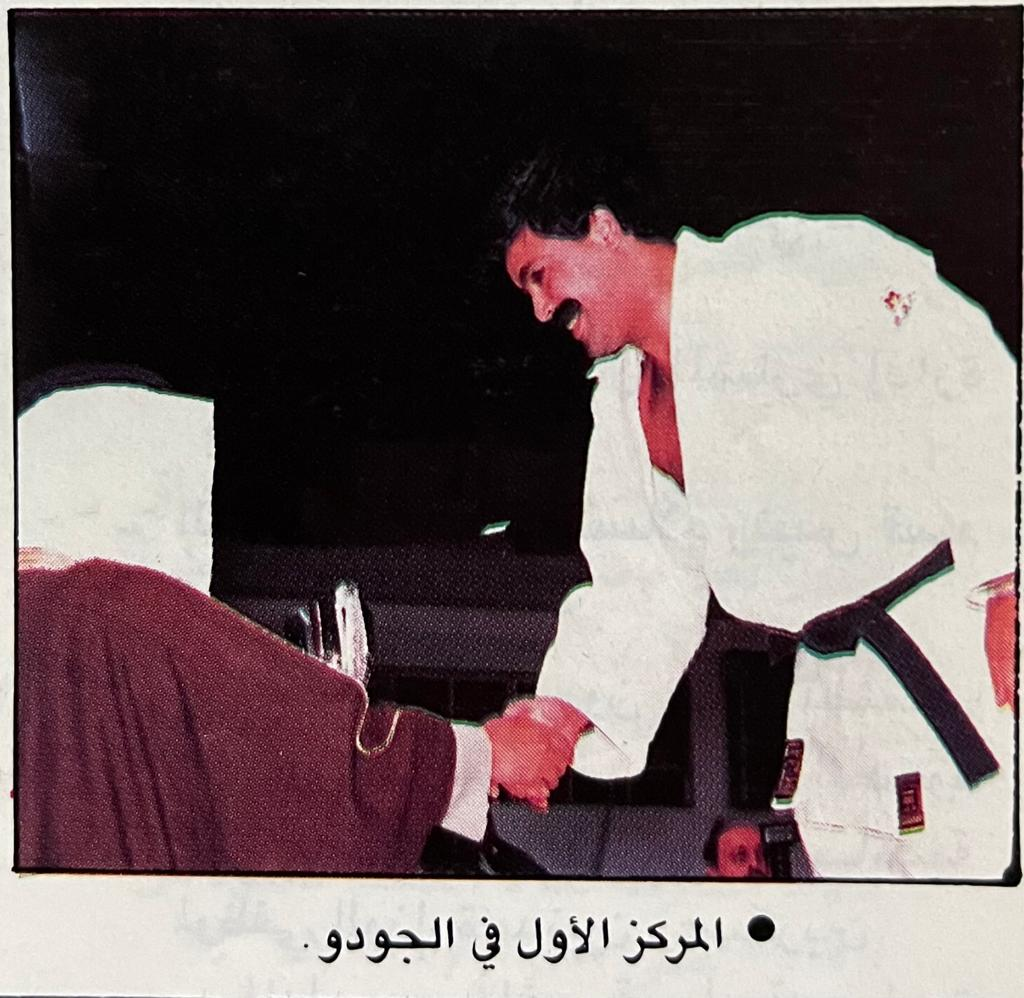

Personal information
- Nationality: Kuwaiti
- Born: 25 July 1961 (age 64)
- Occupation: Judoka

Sport
- Sport: Judo

Tareq Al-Ghareeb (born 25 July 1961) is a Kuwaiti judoka. He competed in the men's half-heavyweight event at the 1984 Summer Olympics. As well as competed and won a bronze medal at the 1986 judo Asian olympics.
