= 1984 Asian Judo Championships =

Judo competition

The 1984 Asian Judo Championships were held at Kuwait City, Kuwait in April.

== Medal overview ==
=== Men's events ===
Event	Gold	Silver	Bronze
Extra-lightweight (60 kg)	Kenichi Hara (JPN)	Zan (CHN)	Park (KOR)
Extra-lightweight (60 kg)	Kenichi Hara (JPN)	Zan (CHN)	Ko (PRK)
Half-lightweight (65 kg)	Yosuke Yamamoto (JPN)	Lee Kyung-keun (KOR)	Bambang Prakarsa (INA)
Half-lightweight (65 kg)	Yosuke Yamamoto (JPN)	Lee Kyung-keun (KOR)	Chen (CHN)
Lightweight (71 kg)	Tsugihiro Nakau (JPN)	Liu (TPE)	Li (CHN)
Lightweight (71 kg)	Tsugihiro Nakau (JPN)	Liu (TPE)	Ahn Byeong-keun (KOR)
Half-middleweight (78 kg)	Hiromitsu Takano (JPN)	Li (KOR)	Liu (CHN)
Half-middleweight (78 kg)	Hiromitsu Takano (JPN)	Li (KOR)	Sapti (KUW)
Middleweight (86 kg)	Seiki Nose (JPN)	Park (PRK)	Viseh (IRI)
Middleweight (86 kg)	Seiki Nose (JPN)	Park (PRK)	Park (KOR)
Half-heavyweight (95 kg)	Masato Mihara (JPN)	Park (KOR)	Xian (CHN)
Half-heavyweight (95 kg)	Masato Mihara (JPN)	Park (KOR)	Ei (TPE)
Heavyweight (+95 kg)	Hisao Ito (JPN)	Zu (CHN)	Idres (KUW)
Heavyweight (+95 kg)	Hisao Ito (JPN)	Zu (CHN)	Hwang (PRK)
Openweight	Yoshimi Masaki (JPN)	Zu (CHN)	Kanbabaei (IRI)
Openweight	Yoshimi Masaki (JPN)	Zu (CHN)	Hwang (PRK)

=== Medals table ===
Rank	Nation	Gold	Silver	Bronze	Total
1	Japan (JPN)	8	0	0	8
2	China (CHN)	0	3	4	7
3	South Korea (KOR)	0	3	3	6
4	North Korea (PRK)	0	1	3	4
5	Chinese Taipei (TPE)	0	1	1	2
6	Iran (IRI)	0	0	2	2
7	Indonesia (INA)	0	0	1	1
Totals (7 entries)		8	8	14	30
