= Abdel Majid Senoussi =

Tunisian judoka (born 1960)

Personal information
- Nationality: Tunisian
- Born: 16 May 1960
- Died: 20 July 2020 (aged 60)

Sport
- Sport: Judo

Abdel Majid Senoussi (16 May 1960 – 20 July 2020) was a Tunisian judoka. He competed in the men's half-heavyweight event at the 1984 Summer Olympics.
