= Masao Murata =

Japanese judoka

Medal record

Representing Japan

Men's Judo

World Championships
Bronze medal – third place	1987 Essen	-86 kg

Masao Murata (村田 正夫, Murata Masao, born 6 April 1964) is a retired Japanese judoka.

Murata is from Ichinomiya, Aichi and moved to Moriguchi, Osaka when he was in the second grade. He belonged to Nippon Steel after graduating from Tokai University.

Murata was good at Uchimata, Seoi nage, Osotogari and Deashibarai

In 1987, he won a bronze medal at the World Championships held in Essen, Germany. He was also expected to get a medal in the Olympic Games in 1988 and 1992 but couldn't participate due to his own Chronic, Cervical disc herniation.

Murata retired in 1994. Now, he has been coaching judo at Biwako Seikei Sport College since 2007.

== Achievements ==
- 1982 - Inter-highschool championships (-86 kg) 2nd
- 1983 - All-Japan Junior Championships (-86 kg) 1st
- 1984 - All-Japan Junior Championships (-86 kg) 1st
- 1985 - All-Japan University Championships (-86 kg) 1st

- All-Japan Selected Championships (-86 kg) 3rd

- 1986 - All-Japan University Championships (-86 kg) 1st

- Jigoro Kano Cup (-86 kg) 3rd
- All-Japan Selected Championships (-86 kg) 2nd

- 1987 - World Championships (-86 kg) 3rd

- All-Japan Selected Championships (-86 kg) 1st
- Kodokan Cup (-86 kg) 3rd

- 1988 - All-Japan Businessgroup Championships (-86 kg) 2nd
- 1989 - Kodokan Cup (-86 kg) 1st
- 1990 - All-Japan Businessgroup Championships (-86 kg) 1st
- 1992 - All-Japan Businessgroup Championships (-86 kg) 3rd
