= Carsten Jensen (judoka) =

Danish judoka (born 1960)

Personal information
- Nationality: Danish
- Born: 19 January 1960 (age 65); Herning, Denmark

Sport
- Sport: Judo

Carsten Jensen (born 19 January 1960) is a Danish judoka. He competed in the men's half-heavyweight event at the 1984 Summer Olympics.
