= Marko Valev =

Bulgarian judoka

Personal information
- Nationality: Bulgarian
- Born: 20 January 1968 (age 57); Pazardzhik, Bulgaria

Sport
- Sport: Judo

Marko Valev (Bulgarian: Марко Вълев; born 20 January 1968) is a Bulgarian judoka. He competed in the men's half-heavyweight event at the 1988 Summer Olympics.
