= Nobutoshi Hikage =

Japanese judoka (born 1956)

Personal information
- Born: 9 July 1956 (age 69)
- Occupation: Judoka

Sport
- Sport: Judo
Medal record
Representing Japan
Men's Judo
World Championships
Gold medal – first place	1983 Moscow	-78 kg
Gold medal – first place	1985 Seoul	-78 kg
Asian Championships
Gold medal – first place	1981 Jakarta	-78 kg

Profile at external databases
- IJF: 1583
- JudoInside.com: 5375

Nobutoshi Hikage (日蔭 暢年, Hikage Nobutoshi; born 9 July 1956) is a Japanese judoka. He was two times world champion of Half-middleweight category.

He is from Miyako, Iwate. He began judo at the age of a 6th grader. After graduation from Kokushikan University, He belonged to Iwate Prefectural Police.

He won the gold medal of world championships in 1983 and 1985. He participate All-Japan Championships 6 times and won the bronze medal in 1982.

He tried by the supervision of all-Japan women's team at 2005 World Championships and 2008 Summer Olympics.
