= Cho Yong-chul =

South Korean judoka (born 1961)

Personal information
- Born: 7 May 1961 (age 65)
- Occupation: Judoka

Korean name
- Hangul: 조용철
- Hanja: 趙容澈
- RR: Jo Yongcheol
- MR: Cho Yongch'ŏl

Sport
- Country: South Korea
- Sport: Judo
- Weight class: +95 kg. Open

Achievements and titles
- Olympic Games: (bronze) (1984, 1988)
- World Champ.: (1985)
- Asian Champ.: (silver) (1986)
Medal record
Men's judo
Representing South Korea
Olympic Games
Bronze medal – third place	1984 Los Angeles	+95 kg
Bronze medal – third place	1988 Seoul	+95 kg
World Championships
Gold medal – first place	1985 Seoul	+95 kg
Asian Games
Silver medal – second place	1986 Seoul	Open

Profile at external databases
- IJF: 165
- JudoInside.com: 6076
- Updated on 18 June 2023

Cho Yong-Chul (Korean: 조용철; born 7 May 1961) is a South Korean judoka.

At the 1985 World Judo Championships in Seoul, Cho won a gold medal, beating double Olympic champion Hitoshi Saito by armlock submission in the final.

Cho won two Olympic bronze medals in the heavyweight division at the 1984 and 1988 Olympic Games.
