= Yury Sokolov (judoka) =

Russian judoka (1961-1990)

Personal information
- Full name: Yury Alekseyevich Sokolov
- Born: 23 February 1961 Leningrad, Soviet Union
- Died: 14 March 1990 (aged 29) Leningrad, Soviet Union
- Occupation: Judoka

Sport
- Country: Soviet Union
- Sport: Judo
- Weight class: ‍–‍65 kg

Achievements and titles
- Olympic Games: R64 (1988)
- World Champ.: (1985)
- European Champ.: (gold) (1986)
Medal record
Men's judo
Representing Soviet Union
World Championships
Gold medal – first place	1985 Seoul	‍–‍65 kg
Silver medal – second place	1987 Essen	‍–‍65 kg
European Championships
Gold medal – first place	1986 Belgrade	‍–‍65 kg
European Junior Championships
Silver medal – second place	1979 Edinburgh	‍–‍60 kg
European Cadet Championships
Gold medal – first place	1978 Miskolc	‍–‍53 kg

Profile at external databases
- IJF: 53824
- JudoInside.com: 5894
- Updated on 21 November 2023

Yury Alekseyevich Sokolov (Russian: Юрий Алексеевич Соколов, 23 February 1961 – 14 March 1990) was a Soviet judoka. He competed in the men's half-lightweight event at the 1988 Summer Olympics. A criminal associate of the Tambovskaya Bratva gang during the final years of the Soviet Union, Sokolov was murdered in his apartment in 1990.
