= Sidney Appelboom =

Belgian swimmer

Personal information
- Born: 24 February 1967 (age 59) Antwerp, Belgium

Sport
- Sport: Swimming

Sidney Appelboom (born 24 February 1967) is a retired Belgian breaststroke and medley swimmer. He competed in three events at the 1988 Summer Olympics.

He won a gold medal in the 200 m breaststroke at the 1989 Maccabiah Games in Israel.
