= Tamás Bujkó =

Hungarian judoka (born 1962)

Personal information
- Born: 2 December 1962
- Died: 21 March 2008 (aged 45)
- Occupation: Judoka

Sport
- Country: Hungary
- Sport: Judo
- Weight class: ‍–‍60 kg, ‍–‍65 kg

Achievements and titles
- Olympic Games: 5th (1988)
- World Champ.: (silver) (1983)
- European Champ.: (bronze) (1987)
Medal record
Men's judo
Representing Hungary
World Championships
Silver medal – second place	1983 Moscow	‍–‍60 kg
Bronze medal – third place	1985 Seoul	‍–‍60 kg
Bronze medal – third place	1987 Essen	‍–‍65 kg
European Championships
Bronze medal – third place	1987 Paris	‍–‍65 kg
European Junior Championships
Gold medal – first place	1981 San Marino	‍–‍60 kg

Profile at external databases
- IJF: 53677
- JudoInside.com: 5262
- Updated on 9 July 2024

Tamás Bujkó (2 December 1962 – 21 March 2008) was a Hungarian judoka who competed at World Championship and Olympic levels.

== Career ==
Bujkó competed at the 1983 World Judo Championships (where he won a silver medal), the 1985 World Judo Championships (where he won a bronze medal), and the 1987 World Judo Championships (where he also won a bronze medal). He also competed at the 1988 Summer Olympics, where he came in fifth place.

== Death ==
Bujkó was murdered in London on 21 March 2008; his murderer Ference Ifi was sentenced to life in prison.
