= Au Woon Yiu =

Hong Kong judoka

Personal information
- Nationality: Hong Konger
- Born: 17 November 1960 (age 64)

Sport
- Sport: Judo

Au Woon Yiu (born 17 November 1960) is a Hong Kong judoka. He competed at the 1988 Summer Olympics and the 1992 Summer Olympics.
