= Viktor Poddubny =

Soviet judoka (born 1965)

Personal information
- Nationality: Soviet
- Born: 30 May 1965 (age 61) Omsk, Soviet Union

Sport
- Sport: Judo
Medal record
Men's judo
Representing Soviet Union
Universiade
Gold medal – first place	1985 Kobe	86 kg
Goodwill Games
Gold medal – first place	1986 Moscow	95 kg
European Championships
Bronze medal – third place	1987 Paris	86 kg

Viktor Anatolyevich Poddubny (Russian: Виктор Анатольевич Поддубный, born 30 May 1965) is a Soviet judoka. He competed in the men's half-heavyweight event at the 1988 Summer Olympics.
