= Jamsrangiin Dorjderem =

Mongolian judoka (born 1964)

Personal information
- Nationality: Mongolian
- Born: 13 December 1964
- Died: 22 March 2018 (aged 53)

Sport
- Sport: Judo

Jamsrangiin Dorjderem (13 December 1964 – 22 March 2018) was a Mongolian judoka. He competed in the men's half-lightweight event at the 1988 Summer Olympics.
