= Yavuz Yolcu =

Turkish judoka

Personal information
- Nationality: Turkish
- Born: 1 January 1966 (age 59)

Sport
- Sport: Judo

Yavuz Yolcu (born 1 January 1966) is a Turkish judoka. He competed in the men's half-lightweight event at the 1988 Summer Olympics.
