= Joe Marchal =

American judoka (born 1960)

Personal information
- Born: October 9, 1960 (age 65) Lansing, Michigan, United States

Sport
- Sport: Judo
Medal record
Representing United States
Summer Universiade
Silver medal – second place	1985 Kobe	-65kg

Joe Hamilton Marchal (born October 9, 1960) is a former US National Champion and a US Olympian in Judo. Marchal competed in the 1988 Summer Olympics. Marchal is currently a professional poker player. Joe is a native of Wisconsin. Marchal owns a house in Guam.
