= Luc Van de Vondel =

Belgian swimmer

Personal information
- Born: 9 February 1965 (age 61) Aalst, Belgium

Sport
- Sport: Swimming

Luc Van de Vondel (born 9 February 1965) is a Belgian breaststroke swimmer. He competed in two events at the 1988 Summer Olympics.
