= 1985 World Judo Championships =

Judo competition

Judo 1985 World Judo Championships
- Venue: Jamsil Arena
- Location: Seoul, South Korea
- Dates: 26–29 September 1985
- Competitors: 189 from 39 nations

Competition at external databases
- Links: IJF • JudoInside

The 1985 World Judo Championships were the 14th edition of the men's World Judo Championships, and were held in Seoul, South Korea from September 26–29, 1985.

== Medal overview ==
=== Men ===
Event	Gold	Silver	Bronze
-60 kg	(Japan) Shinji Hosokawa	(Germany) Peter Jupke	(Hungary) Tamas Bujko (Soviet Union) Khazret Tletseri
-65 kg	(Soviet Union) Yury Sokolov	(South Korea) Lee Kyung-Keun	(United Kingdom) Stephen Gawthorpe (Japan) Yoshiyuki Matsuoka
-71 kg	(South Korea) Ahn Byeong-Keun	(United States) Michael Swain	(Poland) Wiesław Błach (Germany) Steffen Stranz
-78 kg	(Japan) Nobutoshi Hikage	(East Germany) Torsten Bréchôt	(United Kingdom) Neil Adams (Soviet Union) Vladimir Shestakov
-86 kg	(Austria) Peter Seisenbacher	(Bulgaria) Georgi Petrov	(France) Fabien Canu (Soviet Union) Vitali Pesniak
-95 kg	(Japan) Hitoshi Sugai	(South Korea) Ha Hyung-Joo	(Germany) Gunther Neureuther (Belgium) Robert van de Walle
+95 kg	(South Korea) Cho Yong-Chul	(Japan) Hitoshi Saito	(Soviet Union) Grigory Verichev (Bulgaria) Dimitar Zaprianov
Open	(Japan) Yoshimi Masaki	(Egypt) Mohamed Rashwan	(Soviet Union) Khabil Biktachev (Netherlands) Willy Wilhelm

=== Medal table ===
Rank	Nation	Gold	Silver	Bronze	Total
1	Japan (JPN)	4	1	1	6
2	South Korea (KOR)	2	2	0	4
3	Soviet Union (URS)	1	0	5	6
4	Austria (AUT)	1	0	0	1
5	West Germany (FRG)	0	1	2	3
6	Bulgaria (BUL)	0	1	1	2
7	East Germany (GDR)	0	1	0	1
7	Egypt (EGY)	0	1	0	1
7	United States (USA)	0	1	0	1
10	Great Britain (GBR)	0	0	2	2
11	Belgium (BEL)	0	0	1	1
11	France (FRA)	0	0	1	1
11	Hungary (HUN)	0	0	1	1
11	Netherlands (NED)	0	0	1	1
11	Poland (POL)	0	0	1	1
Totals (15 entries)		8	8	16	32

== Links ==
- "World Championships Seoul - Event". judoinside.com.
