= Ilias Ioannou (judoka) =

Cypriot judoka (born 1966)

Personal information
- Nationality: Cypriot
- Born: 24 February 1966 (age 59)
- Occupation: Judoka

Sport
- Sport: Judo

Ilias Ioannou (born 24 February 1966) is a Cypriot judoka. He competed at the 1988 Summer Olympics and the 1992 Summer Olympics.
