= Masato Mihara =

Japanese judoka

Personal information
- Nationality: Japanese
- Born: 1 May 1959 (age 65)

Sport
- Sport: Judo

Masato Mihara (三原 正人, Mihara Masato, born 1 May 1959) is a Japanese judoka. He competed in the men's half-heavyweight event at the 1984 Summer Olympics.
