= Robert Köstenberger =

Austrian judoka

Personal information
- Nationality: Austrian
- Born: 15 January 1957 (age 68); Linz, Austria
- Occupation: Judoka
- Height: 1.85 m (6 ft 1 in)

Sport
- Sport: Judo
- Weight class: –95 kg
- Rank: 5th dan black belt
- League: Staatsliga A
- Club: JC Manner; ASKÖ Reichraming (1986-1988)

Profile at external databases
- IJF: 57454
- JudoInside.com: 10366

Robert Köstenberger (born 15 January 1957) is an Austrian judoka. He competed at the 1980 Summer Olympics and the 1984 Summer Olympics.

Between 1986 and 1988 Köstinger fought in the Staatsliga A for ASKÖ Reichraming. After that he went back to JC Manner.
