= John Adams (judoka) =

Dominican judoka (1960-)

Personal information
- Full name: John Edward Adams Peréz
- Nationality: Dominican
- Born: 16 July 1960 (age 65)
- Height: 1.78 m (5 ft 10 in)
- Weight: 95 kg (209 lb)

Sport
- Sport: Judo

John Edward Adams Peréz (born 16 July 1960) is a Dominican Republic judoka. Beginning in 1980, he attended Universidad APEC, where he won several gold medals competing in national collegiate judo tournaments, before graduating to continue his career in professional judo. According to his club, he held the title of national champion for his competing category from 1979 until his retirement from the sport.

He competed in the 1984 Summer Olympics.

In 1986 he competed in the Central American and Caribbean Games held in Santiago de los Caballeros, while also serving as treasurer for the Dominican Judo Federation. Adams won two bronze medals, competing both in his weight division and in the open weight event.

In 2013, Adams was recognized by the Club Deportivo Naco with a plaque in the Plaza of Immortals for his sporting achievements. The club's website lists him having won medals at the national Military Games, the Central American and Caribbean Championships, the Caribbean Judo Championships, and the Pan American Judo Championships.

After retiring from compotition, Adams continued to work for the Dominican Judo Federation (Fedojudo).
