= Ivo Kostadinov =

Bulgarian judoka

Personal information
- Nationality: Bulgarian
- Born: 8 August 1969 (age 55); Sofia, Bulgaria

Sport
- Sport: Judo

Ivo Kostadinov (Bulgarian: Иво Костадинов, born 8 August 1969) is a Bulgarian judoka. He competed in the men's half-lightweight event at the 1988 Summer Olympics.
