= Douglas Vieira (judoka) =

Brazilian judoka (born 1960)

Personal information
- Born: 17 June 1960 (age 66) Londrina, Brazil
- Occupation: Judoka

Sport
- Country: Brazil
- Sport: Judo
- Weight class: ‍–‍95 kg

Achievements and titles
- Olympic Games: (silver) (1984)
- World Champ.: R32 (1985)
- Pan American Champ.: (silver) (1984)
Medal record
Men's judo
Representing Brazil
Olympic Games
Silver medal – second place	1984 Los Angeles	‍–‍95 kg
Pan American Championships
Silver medal – second place	1984 Mexico CIty	‍–‍95 kg

Profile at external databases
- IJF: 2647
- JudoInside.com: 725
- Updated on 19 June 2023

Douglas Vieira (born 17 June 1960 in Londrina) is a Brazilian judoka and Olympic medalist. Among his best sporting achievements is his silver medal at the 1984 Summer Olympics in Los Angeles.
