= Jean-Marie Arnould =

Belgian swimmer

Personal information
- Born: 27 May 1966 (age 60) Arlon, Belgium

Sport
- Sport: Swimming

Jean-Marie Arnould (born 27 May 1966) is a retired Belgian butterfly and freestyle swimmer. He competed in four events at the 1988 Summer Olympics.
