= Vicente Céspedes =

Paraguayan judoka

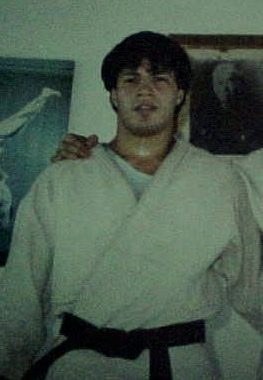
- Vicente Céspedes in 2015

Personal information
- Nationality: Paraguayan
- Born: 8 November 1966 (age 58)

Sport
- Sport: Judo

Vicente Céspedes (born 8 November 1966) is a Paraguayan judoka. He competed at the 1988 Summer Olympics and the 1992 Summer Olympics.
