= Ryohei Kanokogi =

American judoka

- Born: Ryohei Kanokogi; Tokyo, Japan
- Style: Judo, Karate
- Rank: 9th degree red belt in judo

Other information
- Children: 3

Ryohei Kanokogi was an early pioneer for judo in the United States.

== Personal life ==
Ryohei is the grandson of a samurai. He had two children with Rusty Kanokogi, plus a step-son, Christopher, from his wife's previous marriage.

== Martial arts career ==
Ryohei was also the high school Judo champion of Japan. Ryohei Kanokogi was former all-weights judo champion of southeastern Japan. He was also a champion in karate. Ryohei later attended Nichidai University as a member of the judo team. He was featured in a number of Sports Illustrated articles including Confessions Of A Judo Roll-Out.

== Martial arts coaching career ==
He was known for his courtesy and expected good behavior from his students. Along with his wife Rusty Kanokogi, he was influential in the establishment of women's judo. Ryohei was the judo coach for Japan during the Judo at the 1964 Summer Olympics, and later immigrated to the United States with the help of Jerome Mackey. While in New York, he initially taught at Judo, Inc, where he and his wife were featured in an article in Sports Illustrated. He served as a coach for Olympic Bronze Medalist Allen Coage. Later, Ryohei taught at the U.S. Merchant Marine Academy. He later served as a US Olympic Team judo coach.

== Media ==
Kanokogi has appeared in commercials for Samsonite luggage and the after shave Hai Karate.

- The Goodbye Girl (1977) - Japanese Salesman
- Carlito's Way (1993) - Japanese Club Patron
