= Yukiharu Yoshitaka =

Japanese judoka (born 1964)

Personal information
- Born: 12 February 1964 (age 62)
- Occupation: Judoka

Sport
- Sport: Judo
Medal record
Representing Japan
Men's Judo
Asian Games
Silver medal – second place	1986 Seoul	-71 kg
Asian Championships
Silver medal – second place	1988 Damascus	-71 kg
Universiade
Gold medal – first place	1985 Kobe	-71 kg

Profile at external databases
- JudoInside.com: 2995

Yukiharu Yoshitaka (吉鷹 幸春, Yoshitaka Yukiharu; born 1964) is a Japanese judoka.

He was born in Ōkawa, Kagawa.

He won a gold medal at the -71 kg category of the Universiade in 1985 and Paris Super World Cup in 1986.

After graduating from Tsukuba University in 1991, he belonged to Tsukuba-Keikaku. In 1995, he took office as the coach of the judo club at Toin University of Yokohama.
