= Jacek Beutler =

Polish judoka

Personal information
- Nationality: Polish
- Born: 20 July 1964 (age 62) Piła, Poland

Sport
- Sport: Judo

Jacek Beutler (born 20 July 1964) is a Polish judoka. He competed in the men's half-heavyweight event at the 1988 Summer Olympics.
