= István Varga (judoka) =

Hungarian judoka (1960–2023)

Personal information
- Nationality: Hungarian
- Born: 22 August 1960; Nagyszénás, Hungary
- Died: 12 February 2023 (aged 62)

Sport
- Sport: Judo

István Varga (22 August 1960 – 12 February 2023) was a Hungarian judoka. He competed in the men's half-heavyweight event at the 1988 Summer Olympics.
