= Günther Neureuther =

German judoka

Personal information
- Nationality: German
- Born: 6 August 1955 (age 70)
- Occupation: Judoka
- Height: 1.86 m (6 ft 1 in)

Sport
- Country: West Germany
- Sport: Judo
- Weight class: ‍–‍95 kg
- Rank: 8th dan black belt
- Club: TSV München-Großhadern

Achievements and titles
- Olympic Games: (silver) (1976)
- World Champ.: (bronze) (1979, 1983, 1985)
- European Champ.: (gold) (1984)
Medal record
Men's judo
Representing West Germany
Olympic Games
Silver medal – second place	1976 Montreal	+93 kg
Bronze medal – third place	1984 Los Angeles	‍–‍95 kg
World Championships
Bronze medal – third place	1979 Paris	‍–‍95 kg
Bronze medal – third place	1983 Moscow	‍–‍95 kg
Bronze medal – third place	1985 Seoul	‍–‍95 kg
European Championships
Gold medal – first place	1984 Liege	‍–‍95 kg
Silver medal – second place	1974 London	‍–‍93 kg
Silver medal – second place	1982 Rostock	‍–‍95 kg
Bronze medal – third place	1979 Brussels	‍–‍95 kg
Bronze medal – third place	1983 Paris	‍–‍95 kg
Bronze medal – third place	1985 Hamar	‍–‍95 kg
World Juniors Championships
Bronze medal – third place	1974 Rio de Janeiro	‍–‍93 kg

Profile at external databases
- IJF: 54168
- JudoInside.com: 4850
- Updated on 19 June 2023

Günther Neureuther (born 6 August 1955 in Steingaden) is a German former judoka who competed in the 1976 Summer Olympics and in the 1984 Summer Olympics.
