= Maureen Braziel =

American judoka

Personal information
- Born: September 8, 1945 (age 81)
- Home town: Brooklyn, New York, U.S.
- Occupation: Judoka

Sport
- Country: United States
- Sport: Women's Judo
- Weight class: 78kg or less
- Coached by: Kiyoshi Shiina

Profile at external databases
- JudoInside.com: 36526
- Updated on 17 June 2022

Maureen Braziel (born September 8, 1945) was one of the pioneers of Women's Judo competition. She has been thought of as being one of the top Judoka in the United States, and within the 1970s.

== Competition ==
She won the silver medal heavyweight in the 1971 British Open, and bronze in the open division. She was the first female to place in international competition in Judo. As a result, helped to make women's Judo a sport under the Amateur Athletic Union. Maureen was the women's US National 1st-place winner for the heavyweight division and the grand champion for the years 1974, 1975, and 1976.
At a competition weight of 180 lbs, Maureen was strong enough to compete with men. She defeated Diane Pierce in 1974 for the national championship. Diane Pierce would later appear on the show To Tell The Truth claiming to be the 1974 National Judo Champion. Maureen won the gold medal in the 1975 Judo International championship for the heavyweight division in Switzerland. She was the undisputed US Heavyweight Champion on the East Coast from 1967 to 1977. In 1976 she was part of the US Women's National Team under her friend and team coach Rusty Kanokogi She placed second in 1977, 1979 and 1980 for the Women's US Nationals She was the Amateur Athletic Union Most Outstanding Player Award in 1974

In 2021, she was inducted into the United States Judo Federation's Hall of Fame

== Personal life ==
Following competition she founded the PolyTech Judo Club. She served as the head coach for the Poly Tech Judo Club. She would later serve as athletic director at Poly Tech. Even later she would serve as the athletic director for NYU-Poly. She would later retire after 30 years at NYU. She served as the secretary for NYS Judo (circa 2009).
