= Jiří Sosna =

Czech judoka

Personal information
- Nationality: Czech
- Born: 19 January 1960 (age 65); Vimperk, Czechoslovakia
- Occupation: Judoka

Sport
- Sport: Judo

Profile at external databases
- JudoInside.com: 5979

Jiří Sosna (born 19 January 1960) is a Czech former judoka. He competed at the 1988 Summer Olympics and the 1992 Summer Olympics.
