= Yōsuke Yamamoto (judoka) =

Japanese judoka (born 1960)

Personal information
- Born: 22 June 1960 (age 66)
- Occupation: Judoka

Sport
- Country: Japan
- Sport: Judo
- Weight class: ‍–‍65 kg

Achievements and titles
- Olympic Games: (bronze) (1988)
- World Champ.: (1987)
- Asian Champ.: (silver) (1986)
Medal record
Men's judo
Representing Japan
Olympic Games
Bronze medal – third place	1988 Seoul	‍–‍65 kg
World Championships
Gold medal – first place	1987 Essen	‍–‍65 kg
Asian Games
Silver medal – second place	1986 Seoul	‍–‍65 kg
Asian Championships
Gold medal – first place	1984 Kuwait City	‍–‍65 kg

Profile at external databases
- IJF: 11653
- JudoInside.com: 5505
- Updated on 6 June 2023

Yōsuke Yamamoto (山本 洋祐, Yamamoto Yōsuke; born 22 June 1960) is a Japanese judoka.

Yamamoto was born in Tenmei(ja), Kumamoto Prefecture, and began judo at the age of a fifth grader.

After graduating from Nippon Sport Science University, he worked with a teacher in Yamagata and Yamanashi. He won a gold medal at the ‍–‍65 kg category of the 1987 World Championships.

As of 2009, Yamamoto coaches judo at his alma mater, Nippon Sport Science University, where he previously studied as an undergraduate. Among his students is former Pacific Rim champion Arata Kojima.
