= Juri Fazi =

Italian judoka (born 1961)

Personal information
- Nationality: Italian
- Born: 3 July 1961 (age 63); Pesaro, Italy

Sport
- Sport: Judo

Juri Fazi (born 3 July 1961) is an Italian judoka. He competed at the 1984 Summer Olympics and the 1988 Summer Olympics.
