= Marc Meiling =

German judoka

Personal information
- Born: 22 March 1962 (age 64)
- Occupation: Judoka

Sport
- Country: West Germany
- Sport: Judo
- Weight class: –‍95 kg

Achievements and titles
- Olympic Games: (silver) (1988)
- World Champ.: (bronze) (1989, 1991, 1993)
- European Champ.: (silver) (1990)
Medal record
Men's judo
Representing West Germany
Olympic Games
Silver medal – second place	1988 Seoul	‍–‍95 kg
World Championships
Bronze medal – third place	1989 Belgrade	‍–‍95 kg
Bronze medal – third place	1991 Barcelona	‍–‍95 kg
Bronze medal – third place	1993 Hamilton	‍–‍95 kg
European Championships
Silver medal – second place	1990 Frankfurt	‍–‍95 kg
Bronze medal – third place	1987 Paris	‍–‍95 kg
Bronze medal – third place	1989 Helsinki	‍–‍95 kg

Profile at external databases
- IJF: 53803
- JudoInside.com: 2188
- Updated on 18 June 2023

Marc Meiling (born 22 March 1962 in Stuttgart) is a German judoka.

Meiling won a silver medal in the half-heavyweight (95 kg) division at the 1988 Summer Olympics.
