= 1987 World Judo Championships =

Judo competition

Judo 1987 World Judo Championships
- Venue: Grugahalle
- Location: Essen, West Germany
- Dates: 19–22 November 1987
- Competitors: 456 from 63 nations

Competition at external databases
- Links: IJF • JudoInside

The 1987 World Judo Championships were the 15th edition of the World Judo Championships, and were held in Essen, West Germany from November 19–22, 1987.

== Medal overview ==
=== Men ===
Event	Gold	Silver	Bronze
-60 kg	(South Korea) Kim Jae-Yup	(Japan) Shinji Hosokawa	(United States) Kevin Asano (France) Patrick Roux
-65 kg	(Japan) Yosuke Yamamoto	(Soviet Union) Yury Sokolov	(Hungary) Tamas Bujko (Poland) Janusz Pawłowski
-71 kg	(United States) Mike Swain	(France) Marc Alexandre	(United Kingdom) Kerrith Brown (Japan) Toshihiko Koga
-78 kg	(Japan) Hirotaka Okada	(Soviet Union) Bashir Varaev	(South Korea) Lee Koai-Hwa (Poland) Waldemar Legień
-86 kg	(France) Fabien Canu	(North Korea) Pak Jong-Chol	(Japan) Masao Murata (United Kingdom) Densign White
-95 kg	(Japan) Hitoshi Sugai	(Netherlands) Theo Meijer	(South Korea) Ha Hyung-Joo (Brazil) Aurélio Miguel
+95 kg	(Soviet Union) Grigory Verichev	(Egypt) Mohamed Rashwan	(Germany) Jochen Plate (China) Xu Guoqing
Open	(Japan) Naoya Ogawa	(United Kingdom) Elvis Gordon	(Cuba) Jorge Fis Castro (East Germany) Henry Stohr

=== Women ===
Event	Gold	Silver	Bronze
-48 kg	(China) Li Zhongyun	(Japan) Fumiko Ezaki	(Chinese Taipei) Chou Yu-Ping (Netherlands) Jessica Gal
-52 kg	(United Kingdom) Sharon Rendle	(Japan) Kaori Yamaguchi	(France) Dominique Brun (Italy) Alessandra Giungi
-56 kg	(France) Catherine Arnaud	(Australia) Suzanne Williams	(United Kingdom) Ann Hughes (Germany) Regina Philips
-61 kg	(United Kingdom) Diane Bell	(United States) Lynn Roethke	(Japan) Noriko Mochida (Poland) Bogusława Olechnowicz
-66 kg	(Germany) Alexandra Schreiber	(France) Brigitte Deydier	(Austria) Roswitha Hartl (Japan) Hikari Sasaki
-72 kg	(Netherlands) Irene de Kok	(Belgium) Ingrid Berghmans	(Germany) Barbara Claßen (Japan) Yoko Tanabe
+72 kg	(China) Gao Fenglian	(Germany) Regina Sigmund	(United States) Margaret Castro (Netherlands) Angelique Seriese
Open	(China) Gao Fenglian	(Belgium) Ingrid Berghmans	(Germany) Karin Kutz (France) Isabelle Paque

=== Medal table ===
Rank	Nation	Gold	Silver	Bronze	Total
1	Japan (JPN)	4	3	5	12
2	China (CHN)	3	0	1	4
3	France (FRA)	2	2	3	7
4	Great Britain (GBR)	2	1	3	6
5	Soviet Union (URS)	1	2	0	3
6	Germany (GER)	1	1	4	6
7	Netherlands (NED)	1	1	2	4
7	United States (USA)	1	1	2	4
9	South Korea (KOR)	1	0	2	3
10	Belgium (BEL)	0	2	0	2
11	Australia (AUS)	0	1	0	1
11	Egypt (EGY)	0	1	0	1
11	North Korea (PRK)	0	1	0	1
14	Poland (POL)	0	0	3	3
15	Austria (AUT)	0	0	1	1
15	Brazil (BRA)	0	0	1	1
15	Chinese Taipei (TPE)	0	0	1	1
15	Cuba (CUB)	0	0	1	1
15	East Germany (GDR)	0	0	1	1
15	Hungary (HUN)	0	0	1	1
15	Italy (ITA)	0	0	1	1
Totals (21 entries)		16	16	32	64
