= Lee Kyung-keun =

South Korean judoka (born 1962)

Personal information
- Born: 7 November 1962 (age 63)
- Occupation: Judoka

Korean name
- Hangul: 이경근
- Hanja: 李璟根
- RR: I Gyeonggeun
- MR: I Kyŏnggŭn

Sport
- Country: South Korea
- Sport: Judo
- Weight class: ‍–‍65 kg

Achievements and titles
- Olympic Games: (gold) (1988)
- World Champ.: (silver) (1985)
- Asian Champ.: (gold) (1986)
Medal record
Men's judo
Representing South Korea
Olympic Games
Gold medal – first place	1988 Seoul	‍–‍65 kg
World Championships
Silver medal – second place	1985 Seoul	‍–‍65 kg
Asian Games
Gold medal – first place	1986 Seoul	‍–‍65 kg

Profile at external databases
- IJF: 176
- JudoInside.com: 6101
- Updated on 6 June 2023

Lee Kyung-Keun (born 7 November 1962) is a South Korean retired judoka.

Lee was a runner-up in the half-lightweight (65 kg) division at the 1985 World Judo Championships.

Three years later, at the 1988 Summer Olympics in Seoul, Lee won an Olympic gold medal in the half-lightweight (65 kg) division.
