= Judo at the 1988 Summer Olympics =

Judo Judo at the Games of the XXIV Olympiad
- Venue: Jangchung Gymnasium
- Location: Seoul, South Korea
- Dates: 25 September – 1 October 1988
- Competitors: 119 from 62 nations

Competition at external databases
- Links: IJF • JudoInside

The Judo competition at the 1988 Summer Olympics continued the seven weight classes first used at the 1980 Games. The open division was eliminated from the competition. Women's judo made its first appearance at the Olympic Games, as a demonstration sport. Japan failed to claim the top of the medal count for the first time in an Olympics in which they participated, coming in third behind South Korea and Poland.

Peter Seisenbacher from Austria and Hitoshi Saito from Japan won the gold medal in their weight classes, defending their titles from 1984, and becoming the first judoka to win gold at two Olympics.

== Medal summary ==
| Games | Gold | Silver | Bronze |
|---|---|---|---|
| Extra Lightweight; 60 kg | Kim Jae-yup; South Korea | Kevin Asano; United States | Shinji Hosokawa; Japan Amiran Totikashvili; Soviet Union |
| Half Lightweight; 65 kg | Lee Kyung-keun; South Korea | Janusz Pawłowski; Poland | Bruno Carabetta; France Yosuke Yamamoto; Japan |
| Lightweight; 71 kg | Marc Alexandre; France | Sven Loll; East Germany | Mike Swain; United States Georgy Tenadze; Soviet Union |
| Half Middleweight; 78 kg | Waldemar Legień; Poland | Frank Wieneke; West Germany | Torsten Bréchôt; East Germany Bashir Varaev; Soviet Union |
| Middleweight; 86 kg | Peter Seisenbacher; Austria | Vladimir Shestakov; Soviet Union | Akinobu Osako; Japan Ben Spijkers; Netherlands |
| Half Heavyweight; 95 kg | Aurélio Miguel; Brazil | Marc Meiling; West Germany | Dennis Stewart; Great Britain Robert Van de Walle; Belgium |
| Heavyweight +95 kg | Hitoshi Saito; Japan | Henry Stöhr; East Germany | Cho Yong-chul; South Korea Grigory Verichev; Soviet Union |

== Participating nations ==
- Algeria (3)
- Angola (3)
- Argentina (1)
- Australia (2)
- Austria (1)
- Belgium (1)
- Benin (1)
- Bolivia (1)
- Brazil (3)
- Bulgaria (2)
- Canada (3)
- China (2)
- Chinese Taipei (3)
- Colombia (1)
- Costa Rica (1)
- Cyprus (2)
- Czechoslovakia (2)
- Denmark (1)
- Dominican Republic (1)
- East Germany (2)
- Egypt (1)
- El Salvador (1)
- Finland (2)
- France (3)
- Great Britain (3)
- Guam (1)
- Hong Kong (3)
- Hungary (3)
- Ireland (1)
- Italy (2)
- Japan (3)
- Kenya (2)
- Kuwait (2)
- Liechtenstein (2)
- Lebanon (2)
- Mali (2)
- Malta (2)
- Mexico (2)
- Monaco (1)
- Mongolia (3)
- Morocco (2)
- Nepal (2)
- Netherlands (1)
- New Zealand (1)
- Nigeria (1)
- North Yemen (2)
- Paraguay (1)
- Philippines (1)
- Poland (3)
- Portugal (2)
- Puerto Rico (3)
- San Marino (2)
- Senegal (2)
- South Korea (3)
- Soviet Union (3)
- Spain (2)
- Suriname (1)
- Sweden (2)
- Turkey (3)
- United States (3)
- West Germany (3)
- Yugoslavia (1)
- Zimbabwe (1)

== Medal table ==
| Rank | Nation | Gold | Silver | Bronze | Total |
|---|---|---|---|---|---|
| 1 | South Korea | 2 | 0 | 1 | 3 |
| 2 | Poland | 1 | 1 | 0 | 2 |
| 3 | Japan | 1 | 0 | 3 | 4 |
| 4 | France | 1 | 0 | 1 | 2 |
| 5 | Austria | 1 | 0 | 0 | 1 |
| 5 | Brazil | 1 | 0 | 0 | 1 |
| 7 | East Germany | 0 | 2 | 1 | 3 |
| 8 | West Germany | 0 | 2 | 0 | 2 |
| 9 | Soviet Union | 0 | 1 | 4 | 5 |
| 10 | United States | 0 | 1 | 1 | 2 |
| 11 | Belgium | 0 | 0 | 1 | 1 |
| 11 | Great Britain | 0 | 0 | 1 | 1 |
| 11 | Netherlands | 0 | 0 | 1 | 1 |
| Totals (13 entries) | | 7 | 7 | 14 | 28 |

== Women's demonstration events ==
Women's judo made its first appearance at the Olympic Games, as a demonstration sport. The following were the results of the women's competition. Women's Judo became an official part of the Olympic games from the 1992 Barcelona games and has been an integral part of the games since.

| Games | Gold | Silver | Bronze |
|---|---|---|---|
| −48 kg | Li Zhongyun; China | Fumiko Ezaki; Japan | Cho Min-sun; South Korea Julie Reardon; Australia |
| −52 kg | Sharon Rendle; United Kingdom | Dominique Brun; France | Alessandra Giungi; Italy Kaori Yamaguchi; Japan |
| −56 kg | Suzanne Williams; Australia | Liu Guizhu; China | Catherine Arnaud; France Regina Philips; West Germany |
| −61 kg | Diane Bell; United Kingdom | Lynn Roethke; United States | Boguslawa Olechnowicz; Poland Noriko Mochida; Japan |
| −66 kg | Hikari Sasaki; Japan | Brigitte Deydier; France | Park Ji-young; South Korea Roswitha Hartl; Austria |
| −72 kg | Ingrid Berghmans; Belgium | Bae Mi-jung; South Korea | Yoko Tanabe; Japan Barbara Claßen; West Germany |
| +72 kg | Angelique Seriese; Netherlands | Gao Fenglian; China | Regina Sigmund; West Germany Margaret Castro; United States |
