= Judo at the 2000 Summer Olympics – Women's 63 kg =

Women's 63 kg at the Games of the XXVII Olympiad
- Venue: Sydney Convention and Exhibition Centre
- Date: 19 September 2000
- Competitors: 22 from 22 nations

Medalists
1st place, gold medalist(s)		Séverine Vandenhende	France
2nd place, silver medalist(s)		Li Shufang	China
3rd place, bronze medalist(s)		Gella Vandecaveye	Belgium
3rd place, bronze medalist(s)		Jung Sung-Sook	South Korea

These are the results of the women's 63 kg (also known as half-middleweight) competition in judo at the 2000 Summer Olympics in Sydney. A total of 22 women qualified for this event, limited to jūdōka whose body weight was less than, or equal to, 63 kilograms. Competition took place in the Sydney Convention and Exhibition Centre on 19 September.

== Competitors ==
Athlete	Nation
Li Shufang	China
Olga Artamonova	Kyrgyzstan
Carly Dixon	Australia
Gella Vandecaveye	Belgium
Ji Kyong-Sun	North Korea
Eleucadia Vargas	Dominican Republic
Sara Álvarez	Spain
Vania Ishii	Brazil
Daniëlle Vriezema	Netherlands
Anna Saraeva	Russia
Jenny Gal	Italy
Saida Dhahri	Tunisia
Anja von Rekowski	Germany
Karen Roberts	Great Britain
Kenia Rodriguez	Cuba
Bilkisu Yusuf	Nigeria
Eszter Csizmadia	Hungary
Celita Schutz	United States
Keiko Maeda	Japan
Sophie Roberge	Canada
Jung Sung-Sook	South Korea
Séverine Vandenhende	France

== Main bracket ==
The gold and silver medalists were determined by the final match of the main single-elimination bracket.

Round of 32
Olga Artamonova (KGZ)	W
Carly Dixon (AUS)	L
Ji Kyong-Sun (PRK)	W
Eleucadia Vargas (DOM)	L
Vania Ishii (BRA)	W
Daniëlle Vriezema (NED)	L
Kenia Rodríguez (CUB)	W
Bilkisu Yusuf (NGR)	L
Eszter Csizmadia (HUN)	L
Celita Schutz (USA)	W
Jung Sung-Sook (KOR)	L
Séverine Vandenhende (FRA)	W

Round of 16
Li Shufang (CHN)	W
Olga Artamonova (KGZ)	L
Gella Vandecaveye (BEL)	W
Ji Kyong-Sun (PRK)	L
Sara Álvarez (ESP)	L
Vania Ishii (BRA)	W
Anna Saraeva (RUS)	L
Jenny Gal (ITA)	W
Saida Dhahri (TUN)	L
Anja von Rekowski (GER)	W
Karen Roberts (GBR)	W
Kenia Rodríguez (CUB)	L
Celita Schutz (USA)	W
Keiko Maeda (JPN)	L
Sophie Roberge (CAN)	L
Séverine Vandenhende (FRA)	W

Quarterfinals
Li Shufang (CHN)	W
Gella Vandecaveye (BEL)	L
Vania Ishii (BRA)	L
Jenny Gal (ITA)	W
Anja von Rekowski (GER)	W
Karen Roberts (GBR)	L
Celita Schutz (USA)	L
Séverine Vandenhende (FRA)	W

Semifinals
Li Shufang (CHN)	W
Jenny Gal (ITA)	L
Anja von Rekowski (GER)	L
Séverine Vandenhende (FRA)	W

Gold medal final
Li Shufang (CHN)	L
Séverine Vandenhende (FRA)	W

=== Repechage ===
The losing semifinalists as well as those judoka eliminated in earlier rounds by the four semifinalists of the main bracket advanced to the repechage. These matches determined the two bronze medalists for the event.

First round
Artamonova (KGZ)	W
Bye	L
Saraeva (RUS)	W
Bye	L
Dhahri (TUN)	W
Bye	L
Jung (KOR)	W
Roberge (CAN)	L

Second round
Artamonova (KGZ)	L
Vandecaveye (BEL)	W
Saraeva (RUS)	L
Ishii (BRA)	W
Dhahri (TUN)	W
Roberts (GBR)	L
Jung (KOR)	W
Schutz (USA)	L

Third round
Vandecaveye (BEL)	W
Ishii (BRA)	L
Dhahri (TUN)	L
Jung (KOR)	W

Bronze medal finals
Vandecaveye (BEL)	W
Rekowski (GER)	L
Jung (KOR)	W
Gal (ITA)	L
