= Slovenia at the 2004 Summer Olympics =

- IOC code: SLO
- NOC: Olympic Committee of Slovenia
- Website: www.olympic.si (in Slovene and English)

in Athens
- Competitors: 79 in 10 sports
- Flag bearer: Beno Lapajne
- Medals Ranked 63rd: Gold 0 Silver 1 Bronze 3 Total 4

Summer Olympics appearances (overview)
- 1992; 1996; 2000; 2004; 2008; 2012; 2016; 2020; 2024

Other related appearances
- Austria (1912); Yugoslavia (1920–1988)

Slovenia competed at the 2004 Summer Olympics in Athens, Greece, from 13 to 29 August 2004. This was the nation's fourth consecutive appearance at the Summer Olympics since the post-Yugoslav era. The Olympic Committee of Slovenia (Slovene: Olimpijski Komite Slovenije) sent the nation's largest ever delegation to the Games in Olympic history. A total of 79 athletes, 56 men and 23 women, competed in 10 sports. For the second consecutive time, men's handball was the only team-based sport in which Slovenia had its representation at these Games.

The Slovenian team featured three defending Olympic champions from Sydney: double sculls pair Iztok Čop and Luka Špik, and rifle shooter Rajmond Debevec, who became the first Slovenian to compete in six Olympic Games (including two appearances for Socialist Federal Republic of Yugoslavia). Sprinter Merlene Ottey, who granted a dual citizenship in 2002, also set a historic milestone as the first female track and field athlete to participate in seventh Olympics, although she appeared for her native Jamaican team in previous editions. Handball team goalkeeper Beno Lapajne was appointed by the committee to carry the Slovenian flag in the opening ceremony.

Slovenia left Athens with a total of four medals, one silver and bronze, failing to achieve an Olympic gold for the first time since the 1996 Summer Olympics in Atlanta. Unable to defend their Olympic rowing title from the previous Games, Čop and Špik managed to settle only for the silver after losing out to France by two seconds in the men's double sculls. Meanwhile, the remaining medals were awarded to the athletes for the first time in women's judo and sailing.

== Medalists ==
Medal	Name	Sport	Event	Date
Silver	Iztok Čop; Luka Špik	Rowing	Men's double sculls	August 21
Bronze	Urška Žolnir	Judo	Women's 63 kg	August 17
Bronze	Vasilij Žbogar	Sailing	Laser class	August 22
Bronze	Jolanda Čeplak	Athletics	Women's 800 m	August 23

== Athletics ==
Slovenian athletes have so far achieved qualifying standards in the following athletics events (up to a maximum of 3 athletes in each event at the 'A' Standard, and 1 at the 'B' Standard).

Key

- Note–Ranks given for track events are within the athlete's heat only
- Q = Qualified for the next round
- q = Qualified for the next round as a fastest loser or, in field events, by position without achieving the qualifying target
- NR = National record
- N/A = Round not applicable for the event
- Bye = Athlete not required to compete in round

Men
Track & road events

Athlete	Event	Heat		Quarterfinal		Semifinal		Final	
Athlete	Event	Result	Rank	Result	Rank	Result	Rank	Result	Rank
Boštjan Buč	3000 m steeplechase	8:37.29	10	—				Did not advance	
Roman Kejžar	Marathon	—						2:23:34	54
Matic Osovnikar	100 m	10.15 NR	3 Q	10.26	4	Did not advance			
Matic Osovnikar	200 m	20.57	4 Q	20.47 NR	4 q	20.89	8	Did not advance	
Matija Šestak	400 m	45.88	4 q	—		46.54	7	Did not advance	
Damjan Zlatnar	110 m hurdles	13.66 NR	7 q	DNS		Did not advance			

Field events

Athlete	Event	Qualification		Final	
Athlete	Event	Distance	Position	Distance	Position
Gregor Cankar	Long jump	7.32	39	Did not advance	
Primož Kozmus	Hammer throw	78.81	5 Q	78.56	6
Rožle Prezelj	High jump	2.20	=20	Did not advance	
Igor Primc	Discus throw	56.33	30	Did not advance	
Jure Rovan	Pole vault	5.50	25	Did not advance	
Boštjan Šimunič	Triple jump	16.07	37	Did not advance	
Miroslav Vodovnik	Shot put	20.04	12 q	19.34	11
Peter Zupanc	Javelin throw	77.34	22	Did not advance	

Women
Track & road events

Athlete	Event	Heat		Quarterfinal		Semifinal		Final	
Athlete	Event	Result	Rank	Result	Rank	Result	Rank	Result	Rank
Alenka Bikar	200 m	23.09	2 Q	23.38	7	Did not advance			
Jolanda Čeplak	800 m	2:00.61	1 Q	—		1:58.80	2 Q	1:56.43	3rd place, bronze medalist(s)
Helena Javornik	10000 m	—						31:06.63 NR	10
Merlene Ottey	100 m	11.14	2 Q	11.24	3 Q	11.21	5	Did not advance	
Merlene Ottey	200 m	22.72 NR	3 Q	23.07	4 q	DNF		Did not advance	

Field events

Athlete	Event	Qualification		Final	
Athlete	Event	Distance	Position	Distance	Position
Tina Čarman	Long jump	5.72	36	Did not advance	
Teja Melink	Pole vault	4.15	=24	Did not advance	

== Canoeing ==
=== Slalom ===
Athlete	Event	Preliminary						Semifinal		Final			
Athlete	Event	Run 1	Rank	Run 2	Rank	Total	Rank	Time	Rank	Time	Rank	Total	Rank
Simon Hočevar	Men's C-1	104.17	9	105.18	11	209.35	9 Q	100.24	8 Q	99.54	6	199.78	6
Uroš Kodelja	Men's K-1	102.24	19	97.99	13	200.23	17 Q	96.68	8 Q	104.93	10	201.61	10
Nada Mali	Women's K-1	165.65	19	110.83	10	278.48	19	Did not advance					

=== Sprint ===
Athlete	Event	Heats		Semifinals		Final	
Athlete	Event	Time	Rank	Time	Rank	Time	Rank
Jernej Župančič Regent	K-1 1000 m	3:32.552	7 q	3:35.050	6	Did not advance	

Qualification Legend: Q = Qualify to final; q = Qualify to semifinal

== Cycling ==
=== Road ===
Athlete	Event	Time	Rank
Andrej Hauptman	Men's road race	5:41:56	5
Uroš Murn	Men's road race	5:44:13	50
Gorazd Štangelj	Men's road race	5:43:20	43
Gorazd Štangelj	Men's time trial	1:03:45.84	35
Tadej Valjavec	Men's road race	5:41:56	26

== Handball ==
=== Men's tournament ===
Roster

The following is the Slovenia roster in the men's handball tournament of the 2004 Summer Olympics.

Head coaches: Tone Tiselj

No.	Pos.	Name	Date of birth (age)	Height	App.	Goals	Club
1	GK	Dušan Podpečan	12 October 1975 (aged 28)	1.96 m			(Slovenia) RK Gorenje
2	LB	Miladin Kozlina	11 February 1983 (aged 21)	1.97 m			(Slovenia) RK Celje
4	RB	Renato Vugrinec	9 June 1975 (aged 29)	1.95 m			(Slovenia) RK Celje
5	LW	Zoran Jovičič	4 November 1976 (aged 27)	1.84 m			(Slovenia) RK Prevent
6	LW	Andrej Kastelic	6 April 1971 (aged 33)	1.85 m			(Slovenia) RD Prule 67
7	LW	Vid Kavtičnik	24 May 1984 (aged 20)	1.91 m			(Slovenia) RK Gorenje
8	P	Marko Oštir	7 June 1977 (aged 27)	1.94 m			(Slovenia) RK Gorenje
9	RB	Jure Natek	30 March 1982 (aged 22)	1.93 m			(Slovenia) RK Celje
13	P	Tomaž Tomšič	17 August 1972 (aged 31)	1.91 m			(France) US Ivry Handball
14	LB	Siarhei Rutenka	29 August 1981 (aged 22)	1.98 m			(Slovenia) RK Celje
15	LB	Aleš Pajovič	6 January 1979 (aged 25)	1.97 m			(Spain) BM Ciudad Real
16	GK	Beno Lapajne	10 June 1973 (aged 31)	2.00 m			(Slovenia) RK Gold Club
17	RW	Matjaž Brumen	23 December 1982 (aged 21)	1.90 m			(Slovenia) RK Celje
18	CB	Uroš Zorman	9 January 1980 (aged 24)	1.89 m			(Slovenia) RK Celje
20	RW	Luka Žvižej	9 December 1980 (aged 23)	1.84 m			(Spain) FC Barcelona

Group play

Pos	Team	Pld	W	D	L	GF	GA	GD	Pts	Qualification
1	Croatia	5	5	0	0	146	129	+17	10	Quarterfinals
2	Spain	5	4	0	1	154	137	+17	8	Quarterfinals
3	South Korea	5	2	0	3	148	148	0	4 (Note: South Korea 35–32 Russia)	Quarterfinals
4	Russia	5	2	0	3	145	145	0	4	Quarterfinals
5	Iceland	5	1	0	4	143	158	−15	2 (Note: Iceland 30–25 Slovenia)	
6	Slovenia	5	1	0	4	130	149	−19	2	

Rules for classification: 1) Points; 2) Head-to-head points; 3) Head-to-head goal difference; 4) Head-to-head goals scored; 5) Goal difference; 6) Goals scored; 7) Draw.
Notes:

14 August 2004; 14:30	Russia	28 - 25	Slovenia	Sports Pavilion, Athens; Referees: Bord, Buy (FRA)
14 August 2004; 14:30	Kokcharov 9	(16-13)	3 players with 4	Sports Pavilion, Athens; Referees: Bord, Buy (FRA)
14 August 2004; 14:30	2× (yellow card) 8× (suspension) 1× (red card)		3× (yellow card) 9× (suspension)	Sports Pavilion, Athens; Referees: Bord, Buy (FRA)

16 August 2004; 11:30	Slovenia	26 - 27	Croatia	Sports Pavilion, Athens; Referees: Oie, Togstad (NOR)
16 August 2004; 11:30	Brumen 10	(10-13)	Vori 8	Sports Pavilion, Athens; Referees: Oie, Togstad (NOR)
16 August 2004; 11:30	3× (yellow card) 7× (suspension) 2× (red card)		3× (yellow card) 7× (suspension) 1× (red card)	Sports Pavilion, Athens; Referees: Oie, Togstad (NOR)

18 August 2004; 11:30	Iceland	30 - 25	Slovenia	Sports Pavilion, Athens; Referees: Baum, Goralczyk (POL)
18 August 2004; 11:30	G. Sigurdsson 7	(10-10)	Rutenka 10	Sports Pavilion, Athens; Referees: Baum, Goralczyk (POL)
18 August 2004; 11:30	3× (yellow card) 3× (suspension)		3× (yellow card) 3× (suspension)	Sports Pavilion, Athens; Referees: Baum, Goralczyk (POL)

20 August 2004; 11:30	Spain	41 - 28	Slovenia	Sports Pavilion, Athens; Referees: Lemme, Ullrich (GER)
20 August 2004; 11:30	Romero 7	(18-15)	Tomšič, Pajovič 7	Sports Pavilion, Athens; Referees: Lemme, Ullrich (GER)
20 August 2004; 11:30	2× (yellow card) 3× (suspension)		4× (yellow card) 3× (suspension)	Sports Pavilion, Athens; Referees: Lemme, Ullrich (GER)

22 August 2004; 09:30	Slovenia	26 - 23	South Korea	Sports Pavilion, Athens; Referees: Hassan, Aly (EGY)
22 August 2004; 09:30	Rutenka 7	(12-11)	Lee J 6	Sports Pavilion, Athens; Referees: Hassan, Aly (EGY)
22 August 2004; 09:30	4× (yellow card) 8× (suspension) 1× (red card)		3× (yellow card) 2× (suspension)	Sports Pavilion, Athens; Referees: Hassan, Aly (EGY)

Classification match (11th–12th place)

24 August 2004; 09:30	Slovenia	30 - 24	Egypt	Sports Pavilion, Athens; Referees: Hansson, Olsson (SWE)
24 August 2004; 09:30	Brumen, Zvizej 6	(11-13)	Yosry 6	Sports Pavilion, Athens; Referees: Hansson, Olsson (SWE)
24 August 2004; 09:30	1× (yellow card) 7× (suspension) 1× (red card)		1× (yellow card) 5× (suspension)	Sports Pavilion, Athens; Referees: Hansson, Olsson (SWE)

== Judo ==
Five Slovenian judoka (one men and four women) qualified for the 2004 Summer Olympics.

Men

Athlete	Event	Round of 32	Round of 16	Quarterfinals	Semifinals	Repechage 1	Repechage 2	Repechage 3	Final / BM	
Athlete	Event	Opposition Result	Opposition Result	Opposition Result	Opposition Result	Opposition Result	Opposition Result	Opposition Result	Opposition Result	Rank
Sašo Jereb	−73 kg	Malekmohammadi (IRI); L 0010–1000	Did not advance							

Women

Athlete	Event	Round of 32	Round of 16	Quarterfinals	Semifinals	Repechage 1	Repechage 2	Repechage 3	Final / BM	
Athlete	Event	Opposition Result	Opposition Result	Opposition Result	Opposition Result	Opposition Result	Opposition Result	Opposition Result	Opposition Result	Rank
Petra Nareks	−52 kg	Souakri (ALG); L 0001–0010	Did not advance							
Urška Žolnir	−63 kg	Bye	González (CUB); W 0010–0001	Vandecaveye (BEL); W 1020–0000	Heill (AUT); L 0111–1000	Bye			Chisholm (CAN); W 0100–0010	3rd place, bronze medalist(s)
Raša Sraka	−70 kg	Bye	Ueno (JPN); L 0001–0012	Did not advance		Schutz (USA); W 0010–0000	Jacques (BEL); L 0000–0200	Did not advance		
Lucija Polavder	+78 kg	Köppen (GER); L 0000–1010	Did not advance							

== Rowing ==
Slovenian rowers qualified the following boats:

Men

Athlete	Event	Heats		Repechage		Semifinals		Final	
Athlete	Event	Time	Rank	Time	Rank	Time	Rank	Time	Rank
Davor Mizerit	Single sculls	7:24.60	3 R	7:01.31	1 SA/B/C	7:04.07	3 FB	6:55.64	9
Andrej Hrabar; Matija Pavšič	Pair	7:05.36	5 R	6:30.89	3 SA/B	6:46.12	5 FB	6:27.11	9
Iztok Čop; Luka Špik	Double sculls	6:45.26	1 SA/B	Bye		6:11.96	1 FA	6:31.72	2nd place, silver medalist(s)
Janez Klemenčič; Miha Pirih; Tomaž Pirih; Gregor Sračnjek	Four	6:25.36	3 SA/B	Bye		5:55.53	4 FB	5:50.59	9

Qualification Legend: FA=Final A (medal); FB=Final B (non-medal); FC=Final C (non-medal); FD=Final D (non-medal); FE=Final E (non-medal); FF=Final F (non-medal); SA/B=Semifinals A/B; SC/D=Semifinals C/D; SE/F=Semifinals E/F; R=Repechage

== Sailing ==
Slovenian sailors have qualified one boat for each of the following events.

Men

Athlete	Event	Race											Net points	Final rank
Athlete	Event	1	2	3	4	5	6	7	8	9	10	M*	Net points	Final rank
Gašper Vinčec	Finn	4	24	14	19	~~DNF~~	19	8	17	18	5	23	151	20
Tomaž Čopi; Davor Glavina	470	13	13	17	6	15	~~20~~	8	19	15	6	14	126	14

Women

Athlete	Event	Race											Net points	Final rank
Athlete	Event	1	2	3	4	5	6	7	8	9	10	M*	Net points	Final rank
Vesna Dekleva; Klara Maučec	470	3	5	14	~~18~~	2	15	1	2	18	3	2	65	4

Open

Athlete	Event	Race											Net points	Final rank
Athlete	Event	1	2	3	4	5	6	7	8	9	10	M*	Net points	Final rank
Vasilij Žbogar	Laser	~~21~~	13	3	8	4	1	14	1	14	5	13	76	3rd place, bronze medalist(s)

M = Medal race; OCS = On course side of the starting line; DSQ = Disqualified; DNF = Did not finish; DNS= Did not start; RDG = Redress given

== Shooting ==
One Slovenian shooter qualified to compete in the following events:

Men

Athlete	Event	Qualification		Final	
Athlete	Event	Points	Rank	Points	Rank
Rajmond Debevec	10 m air rifle	589	=29	Did not advance	
Rajmond Debevec	50 m rifle prone	594	=9	Did not advance	
Rajmond Debevec	50 m rifle 3 positions	1166	5 Q	1262.6	4

== Swimming ==
Slovenian swimmers earned qualifying standards in the following events (up to a maximum of 2 swimmers in each event at the A-standard time, and 1 at the B-standard time):

Men

Athlete	Event	Heat		Semifinal		Final	
Athlete	Event	Time	Rank	Time	Rank	Time	Rank
Peter Mankoč	50 m freestyle	DNS		Did not advance			
Peter Mankoč	100 m freestyle	49.54	10 Q	49.71	13	Did not advance	
Peter Mankoč	200 m freestyle	1:50.72	22	Did not advance			
Peter Mankoč	100 m butterfly	54.14	29	Did not advance			
Peter Mankoč	200 m individual medley	DNS		Did not advance			
Blaž Medvešek	200 m backstroke	2:01.13	15 Q	1:59.37	7 Q	2:00.06 NR	8
Marko Milenkovič	400 m individual medley	4:30.99	31	—		Did not advance	
Emil Tahirovič	100 m breaststroke	1:02.12	17	Did not advance			
Emil Tahirovič	200 m breaststroke	2:18.65	36	Did not advance			
Bojan Zdešar	400 m freestyle	3:59.38	31	—		Did not advance	
Bojan Zdešar	1500 m freestyle	15:31.57	20	—		Did not advance	
Jernej Godec; Peter Mankoč; Blaž Medvešek; Emil Tahirovič	4 × 100 m medley relay	3:44.17	14	—		Did not advance	

Women

Athlete	Event	Heat		Semifinal		Final	
Athlete	Event	Time	Rank	Time	Rank	Time	Rank
Anja Čarman	400 m freestyle	4:17.79	24	—		Did not advance	
Anja Čarman	800 m freestyle	DNS		—		Did not advance	
Anja Čarman	200 m backstroke	2:17.62	23	Did not advance			
Sara Isaković	50 m freestyle	26.81	36	Did not advance			
Sara Isaković	100 m freestyle	56.67	=26	Did not advance			
Sara Isaković	200 m freestyle	2:01.71	18	Did not advance			
Alenka Kejžar	200 m backstroke	DNS		Did not advance			
Alenka Kejžar	200 m breaststroke	2:32.64	18	Did not advance			
Alenka Kejžar	200 m individual medley	2:18.60	18	Did not advance			
Anja Klinar	200 m butterfly	2:18.15	28	Did not advance			
Anja Klinar	400 m individual medley	4:46.66	13	—		Did not advance	
Lavra Babič; Anja Čarman; Sara Isaković; Anja Klinar	4 × 200 m freestyle relay	8:16.89	16	—		Did not advance	

== Tennis ==
Slovenia nominated four female tennis players to compete in the tournament.

Athlete	Event	Round of 64	Round of 32	Round of 16	Quarterfinals	Semifinals	Final / BM	
Athlete	Event	Opposition Score	Opposition Score	Opposition Score	Opposition Score	Opposition Score	Opposition Score	Rank
Maja Matevžič	Women's singles	Obata (JPN); W 7–6^{(7–3)}, 7–5	Williams (USA); L 0–6, 0–6	Did not advance				
Tina Pisnik	Women's singles	Black (ZIM); L 3–7, 7–5, 4–6	Did not advance					
Katarina Srebotnik	Women's singles	Sánchez (ESP); W 6–3, 0–6, 6–4	Molik (AUS); L 5–7, 4–6	Did not advance				
Tina Križan; Katarina Srebotnik	Women's doubles	—	Dechy / Testud (FRA); L 5–7, 3–6	Did not advance				
Maja Matevžič; Tina Pisnik	Women's doubles	—	Yan Z / Zheng J (CHN); L 1–6, 2–6	Did not advance				

== See also ==
- Slovenia at the 2004 Summer Paralympics
- Slovenia at the 2005 Mediterranean Games
