= Kim Eun-hui =

Kim Eun-hui can refer to:

- Kim Eun-hui (diver) (born 1973), South Korean diver
- Kim Eun-hui (judoka) (born 1973), South Korean judoka
- Kim Eun-hui (volleyball) (born 1948), South Korean volleyball player
- Kim Eun-hee, South Korean playwright
- Kim Eun Gui, member of the World Scout Committee

== See also ==
- Kim (Korean surname)
- Eun-hee, a Korean given name also spelled Eun-hui
