= Judo at the 2004 Summer Olympics – Women's 63 kg =

Women's 63 kg at the Games of the XXVIII Olympiad
- Venue: Ano Liossia Olympic Hall
- Dates: 17 August 2004
- Competitors: 22 from 22 nations
- Winning score: 0200

Medalists
1st place, gold medalist(s)		Ayumi Tanimoto	Japan
2nd place, silver medalist(s)		Claudia Heill	Austria
3rd place, bronze medalist(s)		Driulis González	Cuba
3rd place, bronze medalist(s)		Urška Žolnir	Slovenia

Women's 63 kg competition in judo at the 2004 Summer Olympics was held on August 17 at the Ano Liossia Olympic Hall.

This event was the median of the women's judo weight classes, limiting competitors to a maximum of 63 kilograms of body mass. Like all other judo events, bouts lasted five minutes. If the bout was still tied at the end, it was extended for another five-minute, sudden-death period; if neither judoka scored during that period, the match is decided by the judges. The tournament bracket consisted of a single-elimination contest culminating in a gold medal match. There was also a repechage to determine the winners of the two bronze medals. Each judoka who had lost to a semifinalist competed in the repechage. The two judokas who lost in the semifinals faced the winner of the opposite half of the bracket's repechage in bronze medal bouts.

== Schedule ==
All times are Greece Standard Time (UTC+2)

Date	Time	Round
Tuesday, 17 August 2004	10:30; 13:00; 17:00	Preliminaries; Repechage; Final

== Qualifying athletes ==
Mat	Athlete	Country
1	Diana Maza	Ecuador
1	Saida Dhahri	Tunisia
1	Ayumi Tanimoto	Japan
1	Anna von Harnier	Germany
1	Marie-Hélène Chisholm	Canada
1	Li Shufang	China
1	Daniela Krukower	Argentina
1	Lee Bok-hee	South Korea
1	Lucie Décosse	France
1	Sara Álvarez	Spain
1	Carly Dixon	Australia
2	Ylenia Scapin	Italy
2	Hong Ok-song	North Korea
2	Henriette Moller	South Africa
2	Claudia Heill	Austria
2	Ronda Rousey	United States
2	Sarah Clark	Great Britain
2	Driulis González	Cuba
2	Urška Žolnir	Slovenia
2	Gella Vandecaveye	Belgium
2	Vânia Ishii	Brazil
2	Eleni Tampasi	Greece

== Tournament results ==
=== Final ===
Final
1	Ayumi Tanimoto (JPN)	0200
2	Claudia Heill (AUT)	0000

=== Mat 1 ===
Round of 32
Saida Dhahri (TUN)	0000
Ayumi Tanimoto (JPN)	1000
Anna von Harnier (GER)	0001
Marie-Hélène Chisholm (CAN)	1000
Lucie Décosse (FRA)	1000
Sara Álvarez (ESP)	0001

Round of 16
Diana Maza (ECU)	0000
Ayumi Tanimoto (JPN)	1000
Marie-Hélène Chisholm (CAN)	0010
Li Shufang (CHN)	0000
Daniela Krukower (ARG)	0001
Lee Bok-hee (KOR)	0000
Lucie Décosse (FRA)	1010
Carly Dixon (AUS)	0000

Quarterfinals
Ayumi Tanimoto (JPN)	1000
Marie-Hélène Chisholm (CAN)	0000
Daniela Krukower (ARG)	0001
Lucie Décosse (FRA)	0000

Semifinals
Ayumi Tanimoto (JPN)	WO
Daniela Krukower (ARG)

=== Mat 2 ===
Round of 32
Ylenia Scapin (ITA)	0000
Hong Ok-song (PRK)	0001
Claudia Heill (AUT)	0010
Ronda Rousey (USA)	0000
Gella Vandecaveye (BEL)	1000
Vânia Ishii (BRA)	0000

Round of 16
Hong Ok-song (PRK)	1000
Henriette Moller (RSA)	0000
Claudia Heill (AUT)	1001
Sarah Clark (GBR)	0001
Driulis González (CUB)	0001
Urška Žolnir (SLO)	0010
Gella Vandecaveye (BEL)	1020
Eleni Tampasi (GRE)	0000

Quarterfinals
Hong Ok-song (PRK)	0010
Claudia Heill (AUT)	0100
Urška Žolnir (SLO)	1001
Gella Vandecaveye (BEL)	0001

Semifinals
Claudia Heill (AUT)	1000
Urška Žolnir (SLO)	0111

=== Repechage ===
Those judoka eliminated in earlier rounds by the four semifinalists of the main bracket advanced to the repechage. These matches determined the two bronze medalists for the event.

First round
Saida Dhahri (TUN)	1010
Diana Maza (ECU)	0000
Ronda Rousey (USA)	1000
Sarah Clark (GBR)	0001

Second round
Saida Dhahri (TUN)	0000
Marie-Hélène Chisholm (CAN)	1000
Lee Bok-hee (KOR)	0100
Lucie Décosse (FRA)	0111
Ronda Rousey (USA)	0001
Hong Ok-song (PRK)	0010
Driulis González (CUB)	1000
Gella Vandecaveye (BEL)	0000

Third round
Marie-Hélène Chisholm (CAN)	1010
Lucie Décosse (FRA)	0001
Hong Ok-song (PRK)	0000
Driulis González (CUB)	1010

Bronze medal finals
Marie-Hélène Chisholm (CAN)	0010
Urška Žolnir (SLO)	0100
Driulis González (CUB)	WO
Daniela Krukower (ARG)
