= 2000 Asian Judo Championships =

Judo competition

The 2000 Asian Judo Championships were held in Osaka, Japan 26 May to 28 May 2000.

== Medal overview ==
=== Men's events ===
Event	Gold	Silver	Bronze
Extra-lightweight (60 kg)	Tatsuaki Egusa (JPN)	Aidyn Smagulov (KGZ)	Hyun Seung-Hoon (KOR)
Extra-lightweight (60 kg)	Tatsuaki Egusa (JPN)	Aidyn Smagulov (KGZ)	D. Narmandakh (MGL)
Half-lightweight (66 kg)	Yukimasa Nakamura (JPN)	Kim Hyung-Ju (KOR)	Purevdor Nyamlkhagva (MGL)
Half-lightweight (66 kg)	Yukimasa Nakamura (JPN)	Kim Hyung-Ju (KOR)	Mansur Jumaev (UZB)
Lightweight (73 kg)	Kenzo Nakamura (JPN)	Askhat Shakharov (KAZ)	Seo Yoon-Seok (KOR)
Lightweight (73 kg)	Kenzo Nakamura (JPN)	Askhat Shakharov (KAZ)	Andrey Shturbabin (UZB)
Half-middleweight (81 kg)	Kazem Sarikhani (IRI)	Ruslan Seilkhanov (KAZ)	Tsend-Ayuushiin Ochirbat (MGL)
Half-middleweight (81 kg)	Kazem Sarikhani (IRI)	Ruslan Seilkhanov (KAZ)	Makoto Takimoto (JPN)
Middleweight (90 kg)	Yoon Dong-sik (KOR)	Kamol Muradov (UZB)	Xu Zhiming (CHN)
Middleweight (90 kg)	Yoon Dong-sik (KOR)	Kamol Muradov (UZB)	Masatoshi Tobitsuka (JPN)
Half-heavyweight (100 kg)	Park Sung-Keun (KOR)	Tomokazu Inoue (JPN)	Armen Bagdasarov (UZB)
Half-heavyweight (100 kg)	Park Sung-Keun (KOR)	Tomokazu Inoue (JPN)	Yen Kuo-che (TPE)
Heavyweight (+100 kg)	Yasuyuki Muneta (JPN)	Vyacheslav Berduta (KAZ)	Kang Eui-kei (KOR)
Heavyweight (+100 kg)	Yasuyuki Muneta (JPN)	Vyacheslav Berduta (KAZ)	Mahmoudreza Miran (IRI)
Openweight	Tatsuhiro Muramoto (JPN)	Mahmoudreza Miran (IRI)	Yeldos Ikhsangaliyev (KAZ)
Openweight	Tatsuhiro Muramoto (JPN)	Mahmoudreza Miran (IRI)	Mikhail Sokolov (UZB)

=== Women's events ===
Event	Gold	Silver	Bronze
Extra-lightweight (48 kg)	Atsuko Nagai (JPN)	Gao Lijuan (CHN)	Cha Hyon-Hyang (PRK)
Extra-lightweight (48 kg)	Atsuko Nagai (JPN)	Gao Lijuan (CHN)	Galina Ataýewa (TKM)
Half-lightweight (52 kg)	Yuko Isozaki (JPN)	Chen Bishan (CHN)	Kim Kyung-Ock (KOR)
Half-lightweight (52 kg)	Yuko Isozaki (JPN)	Chen Bishan (CHN)	Shih Pei-Chun (TPE)
Lightweight (57 kg)	Kie Kusakabe (JPN)	K. Erdenet-Od (MGL)	Shen Jun (CHN)
Lightweight (57 kg)	Kie Kusakabe (JPN)	K. Erdenet-Od (MGL)	Ri Myong-Hwa (PRK)
Half-middleweight (63 kg)	Jung Sung-Sook (KOR)	Ji Kyong-Sun (PRK)	Olga Artamonova (KGZ)
Half-middleweight (63 kg)	Jung Sung-Sook (KOR)	Ji Kyong-Sun (PRK)	Keiko Maeda (JPN)
Middleweight (70 kg)	Masae Ueno (JPN)	D. Tserenkhand (MGL)	Cho Min-Sun (KOR)
Middleweight (70 kg)	Masae Ueno (JPN)	D. Tserenkhand (MGL)	Liang Zhenxia (CHN)
Half-heavyweight (78 kg)	Yin Yufeng (CHN)	Mizuho Matsuzaki (JPN)	Sambuu Dashdulam (MGL)
Half-heavyweight (78 kg)	Yin Yufeng (CHN)	Mizuho Matsuzaki (JPN)	Nasiba Salayeva (TKM)
Heavyweight (+78 kg)	Tong Wen (CHN)	Kim Seon-Young (KOR)	Gulnara Kusherbayeva (KAZ)
Heavyweight (+78 kg)	Tong Wen (CHN)	Kim Seon-Young (KOR)	Mayumi Yamashita (JPN)
Openweight	Sun Fuming (CHN)	Choi Sook-Ie (KOR)	Lee Hsiao-hung (TPE)
Openweight	Sun Fuming (CHN)	Choi Sook-Ie (KOR)	Midori Shintani (JPN)

=== Medals table ===
Rank	Nation	Gold	Silver	Bronze	Total
1	Japan	9	2	5	16
2	South Korea	3	3	5	11
3	China	3	2	3	8
4	Iran	1	1	1	3
5	Kazakhstan	0	3	2	5
6	Mongolia	0	2	4	6
7	Uzbekistan	0	1	4	5
8	North Korea	0	1	2	3
9	Kyrgyzstan	0	1	1	2
10	Chinese Taipei	0	0	3	3
11	Turkmenistan	0	0	2	2
Totals (11 entries)		16	16	32	64
