= Judo at the 2002 Asian Games – Women's 57 kg =

Judo competition

Women's 57 kg at the 2002 Asian Games
- Venue: Gudeok Gymnasium
- Date: 2 October 2002
- Competitors: 12 from 12 nations

Medalists
gold medal	Hong Ok-song	North Korea
silver medal	Kie Kusakabe	Japan
bronze medal	Khishigbatyn Erdenet-Od	Mongolia
bronze medal	Kim Hwa-soo	South Korea

The women's 57 kilograms (Lightweight) competition at the 2002 Asian Games in Busan was held on 2 October at the Gudeok Gymnasium.

== Schedule ==
All times are Korea Standard Time (UTC+09:00)

Date	Time	Event
Wednesday, 2 October 2002	14:00	1 round
Wednesday, 2 October 2002	14:00	2 round
Wednesday, 2 October 2002	14:00	Repechage 1 round
Wednesday, 2 October 2002	14:00	Repechage 2 round
Wednesday, 2 October 2002	14:00	Semifinals
Wednesday, 2 October 2002	18:00	Finals

== Results ==
=== Main bracket ===
1 round
Chang Choi Chan (MAC)	0011
Olga Artamonova (KGZ)	0131
Khishigbatyn Erdenet-Od (MGL)	1000
Chan Tsz Kwan (HKG)	0000
Yang Hsien-tzu (TPE)	1000
Kim Hwa-soo (KOR)	0101
Aiman Kaliyeva (KAZ)	0010
L. Brojeshori Devi (IND)	0000

2 round
Hong Ok-song (PRK)	1012
Olga Artamonova (KGZ)	0000
Khishigbatyn Erdenet-Od (MGL)	0010
Shen Jun (CHN)	0010
Yang Hsien-tzu (TPE)	1111
Endang Sri Lestari (INA)	0000
Aiman Kaliyeva (KAZ)	0001
Kie Kusakabe (JPN)	1110

Semifinals
Hong Ok-song (PRK)	0110
Shen Jun (CHN)	0000
Yang Hsien-tzu (TPE)	0001
Kie Kusakabe (JPN)	1001

Final
Hong Ok-song (PRK)	0120
Kie Kusakabe (JPN)	0011

=== Repechage ===
Repechage 1 round
Kim Hwa-soo (KOR)	1020
Endang Sri Lestari (INA)	0000

Repechage 2 round
Olga Artamonova (KGZ)	0000
Khishigbatyn Erdenet-Od (MGL)	1000
Kim Hwa-soo (KOR)	1100
Aiman Kaliyeva (KAZ)	0000

Bronze medal match
Khishigbatyn Erdenet-Od (MGL)	0141
Yang Hsien-tzu (TPE)	0001
Kim Hwa-soo (KOR)	0100
Shen Jun (CHN)	0011
