= Eun-hee =

- Hangul: 은희
- RR: Eunhui
- MR: Ŭnhŭi
- IPA: [ɯnçi]

Eun-hee, also spelled Yeun-hui or Un-hui, is a Korean given name.

People with this name include:

== Athletes ==
- Kim Eun-hui (volleyball) (born 1948), South Korean volleyball player
- Park Eun-hui (born 1970), South Korean fencer
- Cho Eun-hee (born 1972), South Korean handball player
- Kim Eun-hui (diver) (born 1973), South Korean diver
- Kim Eun-hui (judoka) (born 1973), South Korean judoka
- Jeong Eun-hui (born 1977), South Korean handball player
- Lee Eun-hee (judoka) (born 1979), South Korean judo practitioner
- Son Un-hui (born 1981), North Korean gymnast
- Chae Eun-hee (born 1982), South Korean marathon runner
- Phi Un-hui (born 1985), North Korean football player
- Ji Eun-hee (born 1986), South Korean professional golfer
- Ryu Eun-hee (born 1990), South Korean handball player
- Ryo Un-hui (born 1994), North Korean weightlifter

== Entertainers ==
- Choi Eun-hee (1926–2018), South Korean actress
- Bang Eun-hee (born 1967), South Korean actress
- Hong Eun-hee (born 1980), South Korean actress
- Kim Eun-hee (born 1972), South Korean playwright

== Politicians ==
- Cho Eunhee (politician), member of the South Korean National Assembly

== Fictional characters ==
- Lee Eun-hee, in 2012 South Korean television series Ji Woon-soo's Stroke of Luck
- Kim Eun-hee, in 2013 South Korean television series Eunhui
- Kwon Eun-hee, in 2013 South Korean television series Goddess of Marriage

== See also ==
- List of Korean given names
