= Diana Maza =

Ecuadorian judoka (born 1984)

Personal information
- Full name: Diana Cecilia Maza Romero
- Nationality: Ecuador
- Born: 4 October 1984 (age 41) Cañar, Ecuador
- Occupation: Judoka
- Height: 1.68 m (5 ft 6 in)
- Weight: 63 kg (139 lb)

Sport
- Sport: Judo
- Event: 63 kg

Profile at external databases
- JudoInside.com: 18110

Diana Cecilia Maza Romero (born October 4, 1984) is an Ecuadorian judoka. She who competed in the women's half-middleweight category.

== Early life, family and education ==
Diana Maza was born in the Ecuadorian canton Cañar in 1984.

== Athletic career ==
She won the 2001 South American title in her own division, attained a fifth-place finish at the 2003 Pan American Games in Santo Domingo, Dominican Republic, and represented her nation Ecuador in the 63-kg class at the 2004 Summer Olympics.

Maza qualified for the Ecuadorian squad in the women's half-middleweight class (63 kg) at the 2004 Summer Olympics in Athens, by placing fifth and receiving a berth from the Pan American Championships in Margarita Island, Venezuela. She lost her opening match to Japanese judoka and eventual Olympic champion Ayumi Tanimoto by an ippon and an uchi mata (inner thigh throw) at an immediate span of fifteen seconds. In the repechage, Maza gave herself a chance for an Olympic bronze medal, but slipped it away in a defeat to Tunisia's Saida Dhahri, who pinned and clutched her with a yoko shiho gatame (side four-quarter) hold three minutes and seventeen seconds into their first playoff of the draft.
