= Judo at the 1998 Asian Games – Women's 57 kg =

Judo competition

Women's 57 kg at the 1998 Asian Games
- Venue: Thammasat Gymnasium 1
- Date: 8 December 1998
- Competitors: 12 from 12 nations

Medalists
gold medal	Khishigbatyn Erdenet-Od	Mongolia
silver medal	Shen Jun	China
bronze medal	Kie Kusakabe	Japan
bronze medal	Jung Sung-sook	South Korea

The women's 57 kilograms (Lightweight) competition at the 1998 Asian Games in Bangkok, Thailand was held on 8 December 1998 at the Thammasat Gymnasium 1.

== Schedule ==
All times are Indochina Time (UTC+07:00)

Date	Time	Event
Tuesday, 8 December 1998	14:00	Round 1
Tuesday, 8 December 1998	14:00	Quarterfinals
Tuesday, 8 December 1998	14:00	Repechage
Tuesday, 8 December 1998	14:00	Semifinals
Tuesday, 8 December 1998	14:00	Finals

== Results ==
Legend

- DEC — Won by decision
- IPP — Won by ippon
- KOK — Won by koka
- WAZ — Won by waza-ari
- YUK — Won by yuko

=== Main bracket ===
Round 1
Bùi Thúy Quỳnh (VIE)
Shen Jun (CHN)	IPP
Kie Kusakabe (JPN)	YUK
Yang Sun-ae (PRK)
Dina Maksutova (KGZ)	IPP
Elmira Pshayeva (KAZ)
Leong Wai Kei (MAC)
Oksana Kokorina (TKM)	IPP

Quarterfinals
Shen Jun (CHN)	IPP
Rapeepat Kitnopakiat (THA)
Kie Kusakabe (JPN)
Jung Sung-sook (KOR)	IPP
Dina Maksutova (KGZ)	IPP
Suzanna Akhmedova (UZB)
Oksana Kokorina (TKM)
Khishigbatyn Erdenet-Od (MGL)	IPP

Semifinals
Shen Jun (CHN)	KOK
Jung Sung-sook (KOR)
Dina Maksutova (KGZ)
Khishigbatyn Erdenet-Od (MGL)	IPP

Final
Shen Jun (CHN)
Khishigbatyn Erdenet-Od (MGL)	DEC

=== Repechage ===
Repechage 1
Bùi Thúy Quỳnh (VIE)	IPP
Rapeepat Kitnopakiat (THA)
Elmira Pshayeva (KAZ)
Suzanna Akhmedova (UZB)	IPP

Repechage 2
Bùi Thúy Quỳnh (VIE)
Kie Kusakabe (JPN)	IPP
Suzanna Akhmedova (UZB)	IPP
Oksana Kokorina (TKM)

Bronze medals
Kie Kusakabe (JPN)	WAZ
Dina Maksutova (KGZ)
Suzanna Akhmedova (UZB)
Jung Sung-sook (KOR)	IPP
