= Lee Bok-hee =

South Korean judoka (born 1978)

Personal information
- Full name: Lee Bok-hee
- Nationality: South Korea
- Born: 13 December 1978 (age 47) Seoul, South Korea
- Height: 1.68 m (5 ft 6 in)
- Weight: 63 kg (139 lb)

Korean name
- Hangul: 이복희
- RR: I Bokhui
- MR: I Pokhŭi

Sport
- Sport: Judo
- Event: 63 kg
Medal record
Women's judo
Representing South Korea
Summer Universiade
Bronze medal – third place	2001 Beijing	63 kg
Asian Championships
Silver medal – second place	2003 Jeju City	63 kg
Silver medal – second place	2004 Almaty	63 kg
Bronze medal – third place	2005 Tashkent	63 kg

Lee Bok-hee (Korean: 이복희; born December 13, 1978, in Seoul) is a South Korean judoka, who competed in the women's half-middleweight category. She won fourteen medals in her career, including a silver in the 2001 East Asian Games in Osaka, Japan, achieved fifth-place finishes at the 2003 World Judo Championships, and represented her nation South Korea in the 63-kg class at the 2004 Summer Olympics.

Lee emerged onto the world stage at the 2001 East Asian Games in Osaka, Japan, where she won a silver medal in the 63-kg division, losing the final by a "yusei" victory to Chinese judoka and 2000 Olympic silver medalist Li Shufang. This was followed by a share of bronze medal with Russia's Anna Saraeva in the similar category at the Summer Universiade in Beijing, China. As Japan hosted the 2003 World Judo Championships in Osaka, Lee finished in fifth place after losing the bronze medal match to Germany's Anna von Harnier.

At the 2004 Summer Olympics in Athens, Lee qualified for the South Korean squad in the women's half-middleweight class (63 kg), by placing second and receiving a berth from the Asian Championships in Almaty, Kazakhstan. She lost her opening match to Argentina's Daniela Krukower by a golden-score point and a tani otoshi (belt drop) in a close fight. In the repechage, Lee gave herself a chance for an Olympic bronze medal, but slipped it away in a defeat to France's Lucie Décosse, who scored more points than her on waza-ari and threw her down the tatami with a kuchiki taoshi (single leg takedown) assault during their five-minute first round match.

Since her retirement from competition in late 2006, Lee has served and committed as a lifetime coach for her newly-wed husband Choi Sun-ho, who later competed for South Korea in the 90-kg division at the 2008 Summer Olympics in Beijing.
