= Judo at the 1992 Summer Olympics – Women's 52 kg =

Judo at the Olympics

Women's 52 kg at the Games of the XXV Olympiad
- Venue: Palau Blaugrana
- Date: 1 August 1992
- Competitors: 25 from 25 nations

Medalists
| 1st place, gold medalist(s) | | Almudena Muñoz | Spain |
| 2nd place, silver medalist(s) | | Noriko Mizoguchi | Japan |
| 3rd place, bronze medalist(s) | | Li Zhongyun | China |
| 3rd place, bronze medalist(s) | | Sharon Rendle | Great Britain |

The women's 52 kg competition in judo at the 1992 Summer Olympics in Barcelona was held on 1 August at the Palau Blaugrana. The gold medal was won by Almudena Muñoz of Spain.

== Results ==
=== Main brackets ===
==== Pool A ====
Round of 32
Li Zhongyun (CHN) | YUS
Patricia Bevilacqua (BRA) | RA
Dominique Berna (FRA) | KOK
Katalin Parragh (HUN) | E
Legna Verdecia (CUB) | E
Carolina Mariani (ARG) | CHU
Jo Anne Quiring (USA) | RA
Almudena Muñoz (ESP) | YUS
Sharon Rendle (GBR) | IPO
Maria Karagiannopoulou (GRE) | E

Round of 16
Li Zhongyun (CHN) | YUK
Cathy Grainger-Brain (AUS) | RA
Dominique Berna (FRA) | E
Carolina Mariani (ARG) | KOK
Almudena Muñoz (ESP) | IPO
Derya Çalışkan (TUR) | RA
Sharon Rendle (GBR) | IPO
Eva Wikström (SWE) | E

Quarterfinal
Li Zhongyun (CHN) | YUK
Carolina Mariani (ARG) | RA
Almudena Muñoz (ESP) | YUS
Sharon Rendle (GBR) | RA

Semifinal
Li Zhongyun (CHN) | RB
Almudena Muñoz (ESP) | YUS

==== Pool B ====
Round of 32
Noriko Mizoguchi (JPN) | IPO
Lisa Boscarino (PUR) | RB
Alessandra Giungi (ITA) | YUK
Heidi Goossens (BEL) | E
Emiliya Vacheva (BUL) | E
Dina Maksutova (EUN) | IPO
Paula Saldanha (POR) | IPO
Ravdangiin Dechinmaa (MGL) | E

Round of 16
Noriko Mizoguchi (JPN) | WIP
Kim Eun-hui (KOR) | RB
Alessandra Giungi (ITA) | YUK
Yu Wai Seung (HKG) | E
Dina Maksutova (EUN) | RB
Jessica Gal (NED) | YUK
Paula Saldanha (POR) | KOK
Lyne Poirier (CAN) | E

Quarterfinal
Noriko Mizoguchi (JPN) | YUS
Alessandra Giungi (ITA) | RB
Jessica Gal (NED) | IPO
Paula Saldanha (POR) | RB

Semifinal
Noriko Mizoguchi (JPN) | IPO
Jessica Gal (NED) | RA

=== Repechages ===
==== Repechage A ====
Repechage round 1
Patricia Bevilacqua (BRA) | YUK
Cathy Grainger-Brain (AUS) | E
Jo Anne Quiring (USA) | YUK
Derya Çalışkan (TUR) | E

Repechage quarterfinal
Patricia Bevilacqua (BRA) | E
Carolina Mariani (ARG) | YUK
Jo Anne Quiring (USA) | E
Sharon Rendle (GBR) | IPO

Repechage semifinal
Carolina Mariani (ARG) | E
Sharon Rendle (GBR) | IPO

Repechage final
Sharon Rendle (GBR) | IPO (bronze)
Jessica Gal (NED) | E

==== Repechage B ====
Repechage round 1
Lisa Boscarino (PUR) | E
Kim Eun-hui (KOR) | YUK

Repechage quarterfinal
Kim Eun-hui (KOR) | E
Alessandra Giungi (ITA) | YUS
Dina Maksutova (EUN) | E
Paula Saldanha (POR) | YUK

Repechage semifinal
Alessandra Giungi (ITA) | YUS
Paula Saldanha (POR) | E

Repechage final
Alessandra Giungi (ITA) | E
Li Zhongyun (CHN) | YUS (bronze)

=== Final ===
| Final |
| Almudena Muñoz (ESP) | KOK (gold) |
| Noriko Mizoguchi (JPN) | 2nd place, silver medalist(s) |

== Final classification ==
| Rank | Judoka | Nation |
|---|---|---|
| 1st place, gold medalist(s) | Almudena Muñoz | Spain |
| 2nd place, silver medalist(s) | Noriko Mizoguchi | Japan |
| 3rd place, bronze medalist(s) | Li Zhongyun | China |
| 3rd place, bronze medalist(s) | Sharon Rendle | Great Britain |
| 5T | Alessandra Giungi | Italy |
| 5T | Jessica Gal | Netherlands |
| 7T | Carolina Mariani | Argentina |
| 7T | Paula Saldanha | Portugal |
| 9T | Patricia Bevilacqua | Brazil |
| 9T | Jo Anne Quiring | United States |
| 9T | Kim Eun-hui | South Korea |
| 9T | Dina Maksutova | Unified Team |
| 13T | Cathy Grainger-Brain | Australia |
| 13T | Derya Çalışkan | Turkey |
| 13T | Lisa Boscarino | Puerto Rico |
| 16T | Eva Wikström | Sweden |
| 16T | Dominique Berna | France |
| 16T | Yu Wai Seung | Hong Kong |
| 16T | Lyne Poirier | Canada |
| 20T | Katalin Parragh | Hungary |
| 20T | Legna Verdecia | Cuba |
| 20T | Maria Karagiannopoulou | Greece |
| 20T | Heidi Goossens | Belgium |
| 20T | Emiliya Vacheva | Bulgaria |
| 20T | Ravdangiin Dechinmaa | Mongolia |
