= Judo at the 2002 Asian Games – Women's 63 kg =

Judo competition

Women's 63 kg at the 2002 Asian Games
- Venue: Gudeok Gymnasium
- Date: 1 October 2002
- Competitors: 9 from 9 nations

Medalists
gold medal	Ayumi Tanimoto	Japan
silver medal	Ji Kyong-sun	North Korea
bronze medal	Wang Chin-fang	Chinese Taipei
bronze medal	Li Shufang	China

The women's 63 kilograms (Half middleweight) competition at the 2002 Asian Games in Busan was held on 1 October at the Gudeok Gymnasium.

== Schedule ==
All times are Korea Standard Time (UTC+09:00)

Date	Time	Event
Tuesday, 1 October 2002	14:00	1 round
Tuesday, 1 October 2002	14:00	2 round
Tuesday, 1 October 2002	14:00	Repechage 1 round
Tuesday, 1 October 2002	14:00	Repechage 2 round
Tuesday, 1 October 2002	14:00	Semifinals
Tuesday, 1 October 2002	18:00	Finals

== Results ==
=== Main bracket ===
1 round
Ji Kyong-sun (PRK)	1011
Li Shufang (CHN)	0100

2 round
Nadežda Želtakowa (TKM)	0000
Lay Nandar Aung (MYA)	1000
Khüreldorjiin Batkhishig (MGL)	0000
Ayumi Tanimoto (JPN)	1021
Nurgul Tagayeva (KAZ)	0000
Wang Chin-fang (TPE)	1000
Park Ga-young (KOR)	0000
Ji Kyong-sun (PRK)	1000

Semifinals
Lay Nandar Aung (MYA)	0000
Ayumi Tanimoto (JPN)	1000
Wang Chin-fang (TPE)	0000
Ji Kyong-sun (PRK)	1100

Final
Ayumi Tanimoto (JPN)	1000
Ji Kyong-sun (PRK)	0000

=== Repechage ===
Repechage 1 round
Li Shufang (CHN)	1001
Park Ga-young (KOR)	0010

Repechage 2 round
Nadežda Želtakowa (TKM)	0001
Khüreldorjiin Batkhishig (MGL)	0012
Nurgul Tagayeva (KAZ)	0000
Li Shufang (CHN)	1021

Bronze medal match
Khüreldorjiin Batkhishig (MGL)	0001
Wang Chin-fang (TPE)	0010
Li Shufang (CHN)	1020
Lay Nandar Aung (MYA)	0000
