= Grabar (surname) =

Grabar is a Ukrainian surname, an equivalent of Polish Grabarz. Notable people with the surname include:

- André Grabar (1896–1990), Ukrainian-born art historian
- Igor Grabar (1871–1960), Russian painter, publisher, restorer and art historian
- Kolinda Grabar-Kitarović (born 1968), former President of Croatia
- Oleg Grabar (1929–2011), French-born art historian and archeologist
- Pierre Grabar
- Vladimir Grabar (1865–1956), Russian and Soviet jurist

== See also ==
- Hrabar (disambiguation), a related name
- Grabara
