= Boscarino =

Boscarino is an Italian surname. Notable people with the surname include:

- Lisa Boscarino (born 1961), Puerto-Rican judoka
- Salvatore Boscarino (1925–2001), Italian architect and cultural historian
- Samantha Boscarino (born 1994), American actress
