= Noriko Mizoguchi =

Japanese judoka (born 1971)

- on August 20, 2015

Personal information
- Born: 23 July 1971 (age 54)
- Occupation: Judoka

Sport
- Country: Japan
- Sport: Judo
- Weight class: ‍–‍52 kg

Achievements and titles
- Olympic Games: (silver) (1992)
- World Champ.: 9th (1989)
- Asian Champ.: (bronze) (1988)
Medal record
Women's judo
Representing Japan
Olympic Games
Silver medal – second place	1992 Barcelona	‍–‍52 kg
Asian Championships
Bronze medal – third place	1988 Damascus	‍–‍52 kg

Profile at external databases
- IJF: 53285
- JudoInside.com: 2913
- Updated on 5 June 2023

Noriko Mizoguchi (溝口 紀子, Mizoguchi Noriko; born 23 July 1971 in Iwata, Shizuoka, Japan) is a retired judoka from Japan.

== Overviews ==
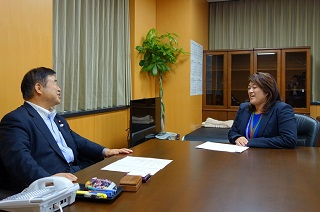
with Toshiaki Endō (20 August 2015)

Mizoguchi claimed the silver medal in the Women's Half-Lightweight (‍–‍52 kg) division at the 1992 Summer Olympics in Barcelona, Spain. In the final she was defeated by Spain's Almudena Muñoz. She also competed at the 1996 Summer Olympics in Atlanta, United States.
