= Eleni Tampasi =

Greek judoka

Personal information
- Full name: Eleni Tampasi
- Nationality: Greece
- Born: 18 September 1976 (age 49) Tripoli, Greece
- Height: 1.63 m (5 ft 4 in)
- Weight: 63 kg (139 lb)

Sport
- Sport: Judo
- Event: 63 kg
- Club: Ethnikos G.S. Athens

Eleni Tampasi (Greek: Ελένη Ταμπάση; born 18 September 1976 in Tripoli) is a Greek judoka, who competed in the women's half-middleweight category. She picked up two Greek senior titles in her own division, and represented her home nation Greece at the 2004 Summer Olympics in Athens. Tampasi is also a full-fledged member of the judo squad for Ethnikos G.S. Athens.

Tampasi qualified for the Greek squad in the women's half-middleweight class (63 kg) at the 2004 Summer Olympics in Athens, by filling up an entry by the International Judo Federation and the Hellenic Olympic Committee, as Greece received an automatic berth for being the host nation. She lost her opening match to Belgium's Gella Vandecaveye, who successfully scored an ippon and gripped her on the tatami with a kuzure kami shiho gatame (broken upper four-quarter hold-down) assault at three minutes and twenty-two seconds.
