= Khishigbatyn Erdenet-Od =

Mongolian Olympic judoka (born 1975)

Personal information
- Born: 7 July 1975 (age 51)
- Occupation: Judoka

Sport
- Country: Mongolia
- Sport: Judo, Sambo
- Weight class: ‍–‍57 kg

Achievements and titles
- Olympic Games: 9th (2000)
- World Champ.: (bronze) (2005)
- Asian Champ.: (gold) (1998, 2001, 2005)
Medal record
Representing Mongolia
Women's judo
World Championships
Bronze medal – third place	2005 Cairo	‍–‍57 kg
Asian Games
Gold medal – first place	1998 Bangkok	‍–‍57 kg
Bronze medal – third place	2002 Busan	‍–‍57 kg
Asian Championships
Gold medal – first place	2001 Ulaanbaatar	‍–‍57 kg
Gold medal – first place	2005 Tashkent	‍–‍57 kg
Silver medal – second place	2000 Osaka	‍–‍57 kg
Silver medal – second place	2003 Jeju	‍–‍57 kg
Silver medal – second place	2004 Almaty	‍–‍57 kg
Bronze medal – third place	2007 Kuwait City	‍–‍57 kg
Bronze medal – third place	2008 Jeju	‍–‍57 kg
East Asian Games
Bronze medal – third place	2001 Osaka	‍–‍57 kg
East Asian Championships
Bronze medal – third place	2006 Ulaanbaatar	‍–‍57 kg
Summer Universiade
Bronze medal – third place	1999 Palma de Mallorca	‍–‍57 kg
Women's Sambo
World Championships
Silver medal – second place	2007 Prague	‍–‍56 kg

Profile at external databases
- IJF: 2734
- JudoInside.com: 10042
- Updated on 23 October 2022

Khishigbatyn Erdenet-Od (Mongolian: Хишигбатын Эрдэнэт-Од; born 7 July 1975) is a Mongolian retired judoka.

== Career ==
Participating at the 2004 Olympic Games, she was stopped in the round of 16 by Kie Kusakabe of Japan.

Khishigbatyn won a bronze medal at the 2005 World Championships after a walk-over in the bronze medal match. This was Mongolia's first World Championships medal for women.

Khishigbatyn finished fifth in the lightweight category (57 kg) at the 2006 Asian Games, having lost to Hong Ok-song of North Korea in the bronze medal match. She currently resides in Ulaanbaatar.
