= Donovan Cech =

South African rower (born 1974)

Medal record

Men's rowing

Representing South Africa

Olympic Games
Bronze medal – third place	2004 Athens	Coxless pairs

World Rowing Championships
Silver medal – second place	2002 Seville	Coxless pairs
Silver medal – second place	2005 Gifu	Coxless pairs
Bronze medal – third place	2001 Lucerne	Coxless pairs
Bronze medal – third place	2003 Milan	Coxless pairs

Donovan Cech (born 2 May 1974) is a South African rower. He competes in the Coxless Pairs division and his boat partner for the past few years has been Ramon di Clemente. The pair won a bronze medal at the 2004 Summer Olympics in Athens.
