= Junshin Junior College =

Private junior college in Fukuoka, Fukuoka, Japan

Coordinates: 33°33′33″N 130°25′15″E

Junshin Junior College (純真短期大学, Junshin tanki daigaku) is a private junior college in Fukuoka, Fukuoka, Japan. The school was originally established as a women's college in 1957. In 2007 it became coeducational.

== Alumni ==
- Kie Kusakabe, judo-ka
