= Hrabar =

Hrabar is a Slavic name and surname It may be a transliteration of Ukrainian: Грабар, Bulgarian: Храбър, as well as an original Latin script spelling. Notable people with the name include:

== Given name ==
- Chernorizets Hrabar (9th century), Bulgarian monk, scholar, and writer
- Hrabar Markov (1918–2007), Bulgarian Catholic clergyman persecuted by the Communists

== Surname ==
- Andrej Hrabar (born 1978), Slovenian rower
- Kostyantin Hrabar (1877–1938), Ukrainian Greek Catholic priest and social and political activist in Transcarpathia
- Mykola Hrabar (born 1962), Ukrainian politician

== See also ==
- Grabar (disambiguation)
