= Séverine Vandenhende =

French judoka (born 1974)

Personal information
- Born: 12 January 1974 (age 52)
- Occupation: Judoka

Sport
- Country: France
- Sport: Judo
- Weight class: –61 kg, –63 kg
- Rank: 7th dan black belt

Achievements and titles
- Olympic Games: (gold) (2000)
- World Champ.: (1997)
- European Champ.: (silver) (2000)
Medal record
Women's judo
Representing France
Olympic Games
| Gold medal – first place | 2000 Sydney | ‍–‍63 kg |
World Championships
| Gold medal – first place | 1997 Paris | ‍–‍61 kg |
European Championships
| Silver medal – second place | 2000 Wrocław | ‍–‍63 kg |
| Bronze medal – third place | 1997 Oostende | ‍–‍61 kg |
World Juniors Championships
| Bronze medal – third place | 1992 Buenos Aires | ‍–‍61 kg |
European Junior Championships
| Silver medal – second place | 1992 Jerusalem | ‍–‍61 kg |
Summer Universiade
| Silver medal – second place | 1995 Fukuoka | ‍–‍61 kg |

Profile at external databases
- IJF: 723
- JudoInside.com: 397
- Updated on 1 June 2023

Séverine Vandenhende (born 12 January 1974 in Dechy) is a French judoka, world champion and Olympic champion. She won a gold medal in the half middleweight division at the 2000 Summer Olympics in Sydney.

Vandenhende won a gold medal at the 1997 World Championships.
