= Claudia Heill =

Austrian judoka (1982–2011)

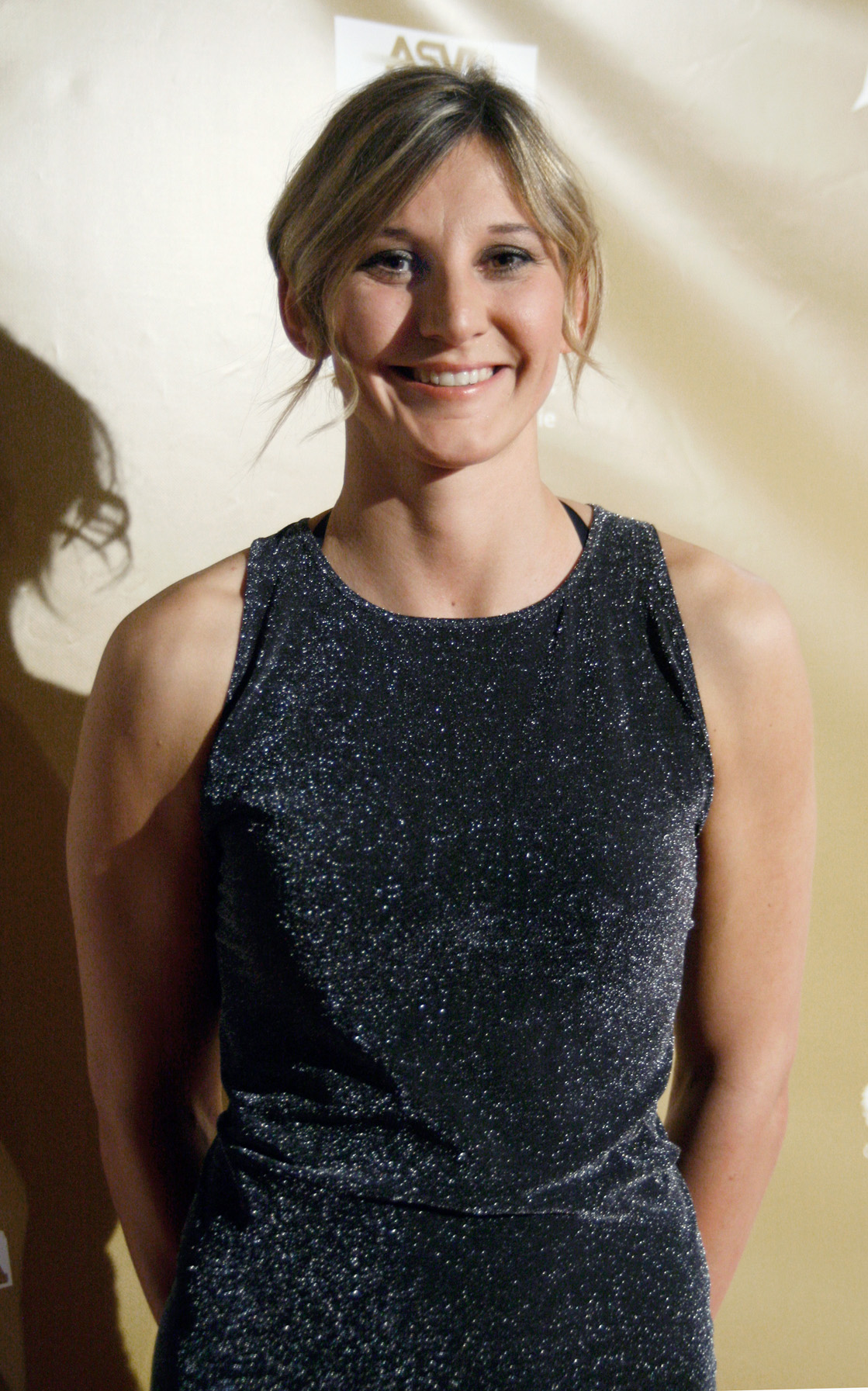
- Claudia Heill (2010)

Personal information
- Born: 24 January 1982 Vienna, Austria
- Died: 31 March 2011 (aged 29) Vienna, Austria
- Occupation: Judoka
- Height: 1.76 m (5 ft 9 in)

Sport
- Country: Austria
- Sport: Judo
- Rank: 4th dan black belt
- Club: JC Shiai-Do Wr. Neudorf Thermenregion
- Coached by: Hupo Rohrauer
- Retired: June 2009

Achievements and titles
- Olympic Games: (silver) (2004)
- World Champ.: 5th (2001)
- European Champ.: (silver) (2001, 2005)
Medal record
Women's judo
Representing Austria
Olympic Games
Silver medal – second place	2004 Athens	‍–‍63 kg
European Championships
Silver medal – second place	2001 Paris	‍–‍63 kg
Silver medal – second place	2005 Rotterdam	‍–‍63 kg
Bronze medal – third place	2002 Maribor	‍–‍63 kg
Bronze medal – third place	2003 Düsseldorf	‍–‍63 kg
Bronze medal – third place	2007 Belgrade	‍–‍63 kg
World Juniors Championships
Silver medal – second place	1998 Cali	‍–‍63 kg
Bronze medal – third place	2000 Nabeul	‍–‍63 kg
European Junior Championships
Gold medal – first place	1998 Bucharest	‍–‍63 kg
Silver medal – second place	2000 Nicosia	‍–‍63 kg

Profile at external databases
- IJF: 401
- JudoInside.com: 498
- Updated on 31 May 2023

Claudia Heill (24 January 1982 – 31 March 2011) was an Austrian judoka best known for winning the silver medal in the half-middleweight (‍–‍63 kg) division at the 2004 Summer Olympics.

== Career ==
In addition to her success at the 2004 Summer Olympics, Heill won silver medals at the European Championships in 2001 and 2005 and bronze medals in 2002, 2003 and 2007. She placed fifth at the 2008 Summer Olympics and retired one year later. After retiring from competition, she began coaching junior judoka.

Heill in 1998 aged 16 won the ‍–‍63 kg category at the Senior Austrian National Championships. Later that same year Heill won silver at the Junior World Championships (Cali) where she lost to the Japanese Keiko Maeda. Within a month Heill took the gold medal at the Junior European Championships (Bucharest). Heill's position as a world-class judoka in the ‍–‍63 kg category was developing quickly. In 2000, at the Junior World Championships (Nabul) she won bronze and at the Junior European Championships (Nicosia) she won silver. By 2001, Heill began concentrating on her senior career and she took a silver medal in the European Championships (Paris) and placed fifth at the World Championships (Munich).

Heill spent the next seven years competing internationally. She was one of four Austrians (Sabrina Filzmoser, Ludwig Paischer and Andreas Mitterfellner making up the quartet) to take gold medals at the World Military Championships in 2006 helping her country top the medal table. Her finest hour was her silver medal-winning performance at the Olympic Games in Athens in 2004. “This had been her dream even as she began practicing her first judo attacks as a seven-year-old,” said her longtime coach Hubert Rohrauer.

Heill was part of the organizing committee at the European Championships in Vienna in 2010 and a commentator on JudoTV at the Judo World Cup in Oberwart.

== Death ==
Heill died in Vienna on 31 March 2011. The manner of death was suicide.
