= Julio Idrovo =

Ecuadorian weightlifter

Personal information
- Born: 15 March 1981 (age 44); Cuenca, Ecuador

Sport
- Sport: Weightlifting

Julio Idrovo (born 15 March 1981) is an Ecuadorian weightlifter. He competed in the men's lightweight event at the 2004 Summer Olympics.
