= Kenia Rodríguez =

Cuban judoka (born 1973)

Personal information
- Nationality: Cuban
- Born: 2 March 1973 (age 53)

Sport
- Sport: Judo
Medal record
Representing Cuba
Pan American Games
| Bronze medal – third place | 1991 Havana | -56kg |
| Bronze medal – third place | 1999 Winnipeg | -63kg |
Central American and Caribbean Games
| Gold medal – first place | 1998 Maracaibo | -63kg |

Kenia Rodríguez (born 2 March 1973) is a Cuban judoka. She competed in the women's half-middleweight event at the 2000 Summer Olympics.

Rodríguez would later switch to competing for Costa Rica, and represented the country at the 2015 Pan American Games in Toronto, Canada.
