= Artour Samsonov =

Russian-born American rower

Personal information
- Born: 9 September 1980 (age 45)

Sport
- Country: United States
- Sport: Rowing

Artour Samsonov (born 9 September 1980) is a Russian-born American rower. He competed at the 2004 Summer Olympics in Athens, where he placed 11th in the men's coxless pair, along with Luke Walton. He graduated from Harvard University.
