= Yu Wai Seung =

Hong Kong judoka (born 1972)

Personal information
- Nationality: Hong Konger
- Born: 21 February 1972 (age 53)

Sport
- Sport: Judo

Yu Wai Seung (born 21 February 1972) is a Hong Kong judoka. She competed in the women's half-lightweight event at the 1992 Summer Olympics.
