= Ravdangiin Dechinmaa =

Mongolian judoka (born 1971)

Personal information
- Nationality: Mongolian
- Born: 19 February 1971 (age 54)

Sport
- Sport: Judo

Ravdangiin Dechinmaa (born 19 February 1971) is a Mongolian judoka. She competed in the women's half-lightweight event at the 1992 Summer Olympics.
