= Derya Çalışkan =

Turkish judoka

Personal information
- Nationality: Turkish
- Born: 1 December 1966 (age 58)
- Occupation: Judoka

Sport
- Sport: Judo

Profile at external databases
- IJF: 53775
- JudoInside.com: 36702

Derya Çalışkan (born 1 December 1966) is a Turkish judoka. She competed in the women's half-lightweight event at the 1992 Summer Olympics.
