= Walter Naneder =

Argentine rower

Personal information
- Born: 27 April 1978 (age 48) Buenos Aires, Argentina

Sport
- Sport: Rowing
Medal record
Representing Argentina
Pan American Games
Gold medal – first place	2003 Santo Domingo	Coxless pair

Walter Naneder (born 27 April 1978) is an Argentine rower. He competed in the men's coxless pair event at the 2004 Summer Olympics.
