= Luke Walton (rower) =

American rower (born 1979)

Personal information
- Born: May 29, 1979 (age 47) Poway, California, U.S.

Sport
- Country: United States
- Sport: Rowing

Luke Edward Walton (born May 29, 1979) is an American rower. He competed at the 2004 Summer Olympics in Athens, where he placed 11th in the men's coxless pair, along with Artour Samsonov. Walton was born in Poway, California.

Walton represented Cambridge at the 2005 Boat Race and 2006 Boat Race. Oxford would go on to win these editions of the event.
