= Bilkisu Yusuf (judoka) =

Nigerian judoka (born 1977)

Personal information
- Nationality: Nigerian
- Born: 8 June 1977 (age 48)

Sport
- Sport: Judo

Bilkisu Yusuf (born 8 June 1977) is a Nigerian judoka. She competed in the women's half-middleweight event at the 2000 Summer Olympics.
