= Tobias Kühne =

German rower (born 1977)

Personal information
- Nationality: German
- Born: 2 May 1977 (age 49) Hanover, West Germany

Sport
- Sport: Rowing

Tobias Kühne (born 2 May 1977) is a German rower. He competed in the men's coxless pair event at the 2004 Summer Olympics.
