= Dominique Berna =

French judoka

Personal information
- Nationality: French
- Born: 15 June 1964 (age 60); Lyon, France

Sport
- Sport: Judo

Dominique Berna (born 15 June 1964) is a French judoka. She competed in the women's half-lightweight event at the 1992 Summer Olympics.
