= Rowing South Africa =

South Africa
- Sport: Rowing
- Abbreviation: RowSA
- Affiliation: International Rowing Federation
- President: Sean Kerr
- Men's coach: Tiago Loureiro
- Women's coach: Andrew Grant

Official website
- www.rowsa.co.za
- (South Africa)

Rowing South Africa(RowSA) is the sport governing body for rowing in South Africa.

Rowing South Africa (RowSA) is the sole governing body for the sport of rowing in South Africa and is recognised with this status by SASCOC and Sport and Recreation South Africa. RowSA controls, administers, manages and co-ordinates rowing and rowing competition in South Africa; controls and manages international competition by national representative rowers in international competition and sanctions international competition by non-representative rowers.

The RowSA Council, made up of representatives of the constituent members, is the highest body of governance in RowSA. The Council meets at least four times a year. The Council elects an Executive Committee, with half of the positions being subject to election in any one year. The RowSA Constitution provides for membership by individual clubs in regions that may not yet have a regional association until such time as a regional association may be formed; this provides for development of the sport in new locations.

Objectives Senior National/Olympic

Qualify four boats for the 2016 Rio Olympics; Win medals at the 2016 Rio Olympics; Retain current athletes and develop athletes coming through from the junior, university, sub-elite and U23 level; Participate successfully in international competitions; Sustainability of National Squad for Tokyo Olympics Compete in local events to increase the level of competition within South Africa, and provide inspiration to younger athletes and create more exposure of the sport of rowing to the public.

U23, University and sub-elite athletes:

Grow and nurture the pool of athletes to feed into the Senior National and Olympic Squads; Retain current athletes and develop athletes coming through from various lower levels; Provide an environment for junior rowers to continue their participation in the sport of rowing; Participation at a sub-elite level allows RowSA to provide transformation athletes the opportunity to participate internationally at a level that is aligned with their performance, better preparing them for Senior National participation; University participation provides the opportunity for talented junior rowers to gain access to tertiary education through a sport scholarship.

== Past Olympic Medalists ==
Medal	Olympics	Event	Crew Members
Bronze	2004 Athens	Men's Coxless pair	Donovan Cech; Ramon di Clemente
Gold	2012 London	Men's lightweight coxless four	James Thompson; John Smith; Matthew Brittain; Sizwe Ndlovu
Silver	2016 Rio de Janeiro	Men's Coxless pair	Lawrence Brittain; Shaun Keeling
