= Grabarz =

Grabarz is a Polish surname literally meaning "gravedigger". Archaic feminine forms (still used colloquially): Grabarzowa (by husband), Grabarzówna (by father). Notable people with the surname include:

- Joseph Grabarz (born 1956), American politician
- Robbie Grabarz (born 1987), British high jumper

== See also ==
- Grabar (disambiguation)
