= Li Zhongyun =

Chinese judoka (born 1967)

Personal information
- Born: 4 March 1967 (age 59)
- Occupation: Judoka

Sport
- Country: China
- Sport: Judo
- Weight class: ‍–‍48 kg, ‍–‍52 kg, –‍56 kg

Achievements and titles
- Olympic Games: (gold) (1988)
- World Champ.: (gold) (1987)
- Asian Champ.: (gold) (1985, 1990)
Medal record
Women's judo
Representing China
Olympic Games
Gold medal – first place	1988 Seoul	‍–‍48 kg
Bronze medal – third place	1992 Barcelona	‍–‍52 kg
World Championships
Gold medal – first place	1987 Essen	‍–‍48 kg
Bronze medal – third place	1986 Maastricht	‍–‍48 kg
Bronze medal – third place	1991 Barcelona	‍–‍56 kg
Asian Games
Gold medal – first place	1990 Beijing	‍–‍56 kg
Asian Championships
Gold medal – first place	1985 Kuwait City	‍–‍56 kg

Profile at external databases
- IJF: 53743
- JudoInside.com: 902
- Updated on 5 June 2023

Li Zhongyun (Chinese: 李忠云; born 4 March 1967) is a female Chinese Judoka. She competed at the 1992 Barcelona Olympic Games, and won a bronze medal in Women's 52 kg.

Zhongyun also won a gold medal in the ‍–‍48 kg at the 1988 Summer Olympics in Seoul, where women's judo was held as a demonstration sport.
