= Rowing at the 2004 Summer Olympics – Men's coxless pair =

Men's coxless pair at the Games of the XXVIII Olympiad
- Competitors: 26 from 13 nations

Medalists
1st place, gold medalist(s)		Drew Ginn and James Tomkins	Australia
2nd place, silver medalist(s)		Siniša Skelin and Nikša Skelin	Croatia
3rd place, bronze medalist(s)		Donovan Cech and Ramon di Clemente	South Africa

Men's coxless pair competition at the 2004 Summer Olympics in Athens.

This rowing event was a sweep event, meaning that each rower has one oar and rows on only one side. Two rowers crewed each boat, with no coxswain. The competition consists of multiple rounds. Finals were held to determine the placing of each boat; these finals were given letters with those nearer to the beginning of the alphabet meaning a better ranking. Semifinals were named based on which finals they fed, with each semifinal having two possible finals.

Gold	Silver	Bronze
Drew Ginn and James Tomkins (AUS)	Siniša Skelin and Nikša Skelin (CRO)	Donovan Cech and Ramon di Clemente (RSA)

== Heats ==
- SF denotes qualification to Semifinal.
- R denotes qualification to Repechage.

=== Heat 1 (August 14) ===
1. Australia: Drew Ginn, James Tomkins, 6:55.04 -> SF
2. Serbia and Montenegro: Nikola Stojić, Mladen Stegić, 6:58.11 -> SF
3. Great Britain: Toby Garbett, Rick Dunn, 6:58.95 -> SF
4. Argentina: Walter Naneder, Marcos Morales, 7:02.29 -> R
5. Slovenia: Matija Pavšič, Andrej Hrabar, 7:05.36 -> R

=== Heat 2 (August 14) ===
1. South Africa: Donovan Cech, Ramon di Clemente, 6:57.06 -> SF
2. Croatia: Siniša Skelin, Nikša Skelin, 7:01.28 -> SF
3. United States: Luke Walton, Artour Samsonov, 7:11.81 -> SF
4. Czech Republic: Adam Michálek, Petr Imre, 7:26.19 -> R

=== Heat 3 (August 14) ===
1. New Zealand: Nathan Twaddle, George Bridgewater, 6:54.75 -> SF
2. Canada: Dave Calder, Chris Jarvis, 6:56.23 -> SF
3. Italy: Giuseppe De Vita, Dario Lari, 7:03.12 -> SF
4. Germany: Tobias Kühne, Jan Herzog, 7:14.16 -> R

== Repechage ==
- SF denotes qualification to Semifinal.

=== Repechage 1 (August 17) ===
1. Germany: Tobias Kühne, Jan Herzog, 6:28.40 -> SF
2. Argentina: Walter Naneder, Marcos Morales, 6:28.98 -> SF
3. Slovenia: Matija Pavšič, Andrej Hrabar, 6:30.89 -> SF
4. Czech Republic: Adam Michálek, Petr Imre, 6:33.24

== Semifinals ==
- FA denotes qualification to Final A.
- FB denotes qualification to Final B.

=== Semifinal A (August 18) ===
1. Australia (Drew Ginn, James Tomkins) 6:22.60 FA
2. Croatia (Siniša Skelin, Nikša Skelin) 6:23.57 FA
3. New Zealand (Nathan Twaddle, George Bridgewater) 6:24.49 FA
4. Great Britain (Toby Garbett, Rick Dunn) 6:25.06 FB
5. Italy (Giuseppe de Vita, Dario Lari) 6:31.26 FB
6. Argentina (Walter Naneder, Marcos Morales) 7:19.57 FB

=== Semifinal B (August 18) ===
1. Germany (Tobias Kühne, Jan Herzog) 6:25.47 FA
2. Serbia and Montenegro (Nikola Stojić, Mladen Stegić) 6:27.50 FA
3. South Africa (Donovan Cech, Ramon di Clemente) 6:28.48 FA
4. United States (Luke Walton, Artour Samsonov) 6:32.51 FB
5. Slovenia (Matija Pavšič, Andrej Hrabar) 6:46.12 FB
6. Canada (Dave Calder, Chris Jarvis) Excluded FB

Semifinal B was a close, dramatic race. 100 meters from the finishing line, there were four boats in contention for the 3 available places in the finals. Germany held a small lead followed by Canada, South Africa and Serbia and Montenegro. Canada suddenly veered off course, interfering with South Africa and allowing Serbia to pass it. South Africa protested, and Canada was excluded from the results. Canada requested that they would be allowed into the final as the seventh boat. The decision not to allow this came after the B Final had raced.

== Finals ==
=== Final A (August 21) ===
1. Australia (Drew Ginn, James Tomkins) 6:30.76
2. Croatia (Siniša Skelin, Nikša Skelin) 6:32.64
3. South Africa (Donovan Cech, Ramon di Clemente) 6:33.40
4. New Zealand (Nathan Twaddle, George Bridgewater) 6:34.24
5. Serbia and Montenegro (Nikola Stojić, Mladen Stegić) 6:39.74
6. Germany (Tobias Kühne, Jan Herzog) 6:46.50

In the finals, Australia's Drew Ginn and James Tomkins established an early lead over the field which they stretched to 2 seconds at the 1000 metre mark (halfway), with Croatia in second and Serbia in third. Over the last 1000 meters, Australia maintained its margin over the rest of the field, Croatia continued to run second and South Africa rowed through to finish third. For Tomkins, it was his third gold medal and fourth overall, and for Ginn it was his second gold.

=== Final B (August 19) ===
1. Great Britain (Toby Garbett, Rick Dunn) 6:22.04
2. Italy (Giuseppe de Vita, Dario Lari) 6:22.08
3. Slovenia (Matija Pavšič, Andrej Hrabar) 6:27.11
4. Argentina (Walter Naneder, Marcos Morales) 6:27.88
5. United States (Luke Walton, Artour Samsonov) 6:30.49
6. Canada (Dave Calder, Chris Jarvis) DNS
