= Eva Wikström =

Swedish judoka

Personal information
- Nationality: Swedish
- Born: 14 February 1968 (age 57); Mora, Sweden

Sport
- Sport: Judo

Eva Wikström (born 14 February 1968) is a Swedish judoka. She competed in the women's half-lightweight event at the 1992 Summer Olympics.
