= Ramon di Clemente =

South African rower

Medal record

Men's rowing

Representing South Africa

Olympic Games
| Bronze medal – third place | 2004 Athens | Coxless pairs |

World Rowing Championships
| Silver medal – second place | 2002 Seville | Coxless pairs |
| Silver medal – second place | 2005 Gifu | Coxless pairs |
| Bronze medal – third place | 2001 Lucerne | Coxless pairs |
| Bronze medal – third place | 2003 Milan | Coxless pairs |

Ramon di Clemente (born 2 May 1975) is a South African rower and Olympic medalist. He competes in the coxless pair event with his boat partner of the past few years, Donovan Cech. They won the bronze medal in the 2004 Summer Olympics in Athens.

In 2008, Donovan Cech was replaced by Shaun Keeling due to a persistent lower-back injury. After only a few months rowing together Ramon di Clementi and Shaun Keeling went on to make the A final at the Olympics. After a closely fought race they were narrowly beaten by 4 crews and came in fifth.

== Achievements ==
- 2005 – World Championships silver medal
- 2004 – 2004 Summer Olympics bronze medal
- 2003 – World Championships bronze medal
- 2002 – World Championships silver medal
- 2001 – World Championships bronze medal
- 2008, 2007, 2005 & 2004 – winner of Silver Goblets & Nickalls' Challenge Cup at the Henley Royal Regatta
- A finalist at the 2000 Sydney Olympics and 2008 Beijing Olympics

== Affiliations ==
- TuksSport – University of Pretoria, South Africa
