= Grabar (disambiguation) =

Grabar may refer to:

- Grabar (surname)
- Grabar, Armenian name for Classical Armenian
- Grabar River, Poland

== See also ==
- Hrabar (disambiguation)
- Grabara
