= Petr Imre =

Czech rower

Personal information
- Born: 17 July 1975 (age 50); Prague, the Czech Republic
- Height: 195 cm (6 ft 5 in)
- Weight: 95 kg (209 lb)

Sport
- Sport: Rowing

Petr Imre (born 17 July 1975) is a Czech rower. He competed at the 2004 Summer Olympics in Athens with the men's coxless pair where they were eliminated in round one.
