= Emiliya Vacheva =

Bulgarian judoka

Personal information
- Nationality: Bulgarian
- Born: 1 March 1973 (age 52); Sofia, Bulgaria

Sport
- Sport: Judo

Emiliya Vacheva (Bulgarian: Емилия Вачева; born 1 March 1973) is a Bulgarian judoka. She competed in the women's half-lightweight event at the 1992 Summer Olympics.
