= Patricia Bevilacqua =

Brazilian judoka (born 1965)

Personal information
- Born: 24 March 1965 (age 61) Rio de Janeiro, Brazil

Sport
- Sport: Judo
Medal record
Representing Brazil
Pan American Games
Silver medal – second place	1991 Havana	Half-lightweight

Patricia Dias Bevilacqua (born 24 March 1965) is a Brazilian judoka. She competed in the women's half-lightweight event at the 1992 Summer Olympics.
