= Jung Sung-sook =

South Korean judoka (born 1972)

Personal information
- Born: 26 January 1972 (age 54)
- Occupation: Judoka

Korean name
- Hangul: 정성숙
- Hanja: 鄭成淑
- RR: Jeong Seongsuk
- MR: Chŏng Sŏngsuk

Sport
- Country: South Korea
- Sport: Judo
- Weight class: ‍–‍57 kg, ‍–‍61 kg, ‍–‍63 kg

Achievements and titles
- Olympic Games: (bronze) (1996, 2000)
- World Champ.: (gold) (1995)
- Asian Champ.: (gold) (1993, 1994, 1995, 1996, 1997, 2000)
Medal record
Women's judo
Representing South Korea
Olympic Games
Bronze medal – third place	1996 Atlanta	‍–‍61 kg
Bronze medal – third place	2000 Sydney	‍–‍63 kg
World Championships
Gold medal – first place	1995 Chiba	‍–‍61 kg
Bronze medal – third place	1997 Paris	‍–‍61 kg
Asian Games
Gold medal – first place	1994 Hiroshima	‍–‍61 kg
Bronze medal – third place	1998 Bangkok	‍–‍57 kg
Asian Championships
Gold medal – first place	1993 Macau	‍–‍61 kg
Gold medal – first place	1995 New Delhi	‍–‍61 kg
Gold medal – first place	1996 Ho Chi Minh	‍–‍61 kg
Gold medal – first place	1997 Manila	‍–‍61 kg
Gold medal – first place	2000 Osaka	‍–‍63 kg
Summer Universiade
Gold medal – first place	1995 Fukuoka	‍–‍61 kg

Profile at external databases
- IJF: 53135
- JudoInside.com: 10236
- Updated on 1 June 2023

Jung Sung-Sook (born 26 January 1972) is a South Korean judoka.

Jung won two Olympic bronze medals in the half-middleweight division in 1996 and 2000.

In 1995, Jung won the gold medal at the World championships in Chiba, Japan.

Jung is a 5-time champion in the half-middleweight division at the Asian Championships.
