= Katalin Parragh =

Hungarian judoka

Personal information
- Nationality: Hungarian
- Born: 22 January 1972 (age 54) Pécs, Hungary

Sport
- Sport: Judo

Katalin Parragh (born 22 January 1972) is a Hungarian judoka. She competed in the women's half-lightweight event at the 1992 Summer Olympics.
