= Paula Saldanha =

Portuguese judoka

Personal information
- Nationality: Portuguese
- Born: 6 March 1972 (age 54) Funchal, Portugal

Sport
- Sport: Judo
Medal record
Women's judo
Representing Portugal
European Championships
Silver medal – second place	1999 Bratislava	–52 kg

Paula Saldanha (born 6 March 1972) is a Portuguese judoka. She competed in the women's half-lightweight event at the 1992 Summer Olympics.
