= Jo Anne Quiring =

American judoka (born 1963)

Personal information
- Born: October 8, 1963 (age 62) Denver, Colorado, United States

Sport
- Sport: Judo
Medal record
Representing United States
Pan American Games
Silver medal – second place	1987 Indianapolis	Half-lightweight
Bronze medal – third place	1995 Mar del Plata	Half-lightweight
Pan American Championships
Bronze medal – third place	1988 Buenos Aires	Half-lightweight
Bronze medal – third place	1992 Hamilton	Half-lightweight

Jo Anne Quiring (born October 8, 1963) is a former American judoka. She competed at the 1992 Summer Olympics.

She competed in the 1991 World Judo Championships.

In the 1992 Olympics, she competed for the United States in the women's half lightweight tying for 9th.
