= Almudena Muñoz =

Spanish judoka

Personal information
- Full name: Almudena Muñoz Martínez
- Born: 4 November 1968 (age 57) Valencia, Spain
- Occupation: Judoka

Sport
- Country: Spain
- Sport: Judo
- Weight class: ‍–‍52 kg

Achievements and titles
- Olympic Games: (gold) (1992)
- World Champ.: (silver) (1993)
- European Champ.: (gold) (1993)
Medal record
Women's judo
Representing Spain
Olympic Games
Gold medal – first place	1992 Barcelona	‍–‍52 kg
World Championships
Silver medal – second place	1993 Hamilton	‍–‍52 kg
European Championships
Gold medal – first place	1993 Athens	‍–‍52 kg

Profile at external databases
- IJF: 53271
- JudoInside.com: 3465
- Updated on 5 June 2023

Almudena Muñoz Martínez (born 4 November 1968) is a former judoka competitor from Spain who won the gold medal in women's ‍–‍52 kg division at the 1992 Summer Olympics of Barcelona, Spain. Muñoz also competed at the 1996 Summer Olympics in Atlanta, United States.
