= Keiko Teshima =

Japanese judoka (born 1980)

Personal information
- Born: 25 March 1980 (age 46)
- Occupation: Judoka

Sport
- Country: Japan
- Sport: Judo
- Weight class: ‍–‍63 kg

Achievements and titles
- Olympic Games: R16 (2000)
- World Champ.: (1999)
- Asian Champ.: (bronze) (2000)
Medal record
Women's judo
Representing Japan
World Championships
Gold medal – first place	1999 Birmingham	‍–‍63 kg
Asian Championships
Bronze medal – third place	2000 Osaka	‍–‍63 kg
World Juniors Championships
Gold medal – first place	1998 Cali	‍–‍63 kg

Profile at external databases
- IJF: 53134
- JudoInside.com: 6514
- Updated on 10 January 2023

Keiko Teshima (手島 桂子, Teshima Keiko; née Maeda Maeda (前田); born 25 March 1980) is a Japanese retired judoka.

Teshima was born in Takasago, Hyogo, and began judo at the age of 12. She entered Miki House after graduating from Tsukuba University. She was good at Seoinage and Newaza.

In 1998, Teshima won a gold medal the World Junior Judo Championships. In 1999, she won a gold medal at the World Judo Championships and the Ippon Trophy.

Teshima also participated in the 2000 Summer Olympics but was defeated by Celita Schutz from USA.
