= Ayumi Tanimoto =

Japanese judoka (born 1981)

Personal information
- Born: 4 August 1981 (age 45)
- Occupation: Judoka

Sport
- Country: Japan
- Sport: Judo
- Weight class: –63 kg

Achievements and titles
- Olympic Games: (gold) (2004, 2008)
- World Champ.: (silver) (2005)
- Asian Champ.: (gold) (2001, 2002, 2004)
Medal record
Women's judo
Representing Japan
Olympic Games
Gold medal – first place	2004 Athens	‍–‍63 kg
Gold medal – first place	2008 Beijing	‍–‍63 kg
World Championships
Silver medal – second place	2005 Cairo	‍–‍63 kg
Bronze medal – third place	2001 Munich	‍–‍63 kg
Bronze medal – third place	2007 Rio de Janeiro	‍–‍63 kg
Asian Games
Gold medal – first place	2002 Busan	‍–‍63 kg
Bronze medal – third place	2006 Doha	‍–‍63 kg
Asian Championships
Gold medal – first place	2001 Ulaanbaatar	‍–‍63 kg
Gold medal – first place	2004 Almaty	‍–‍63 kg
World Juniors Championships
Silver medal – second place	2000 Nabeul	‍–‍63 kg

Profile at external databases
- IJF: 6358
- JudoInside.com: 11972
- Updated on 30 May 2023

Ayumi Tanimoto (谷本 歩実, Tanimoto Ayumi) born 4 August 1981, in Anjo, Aichi, is a Japanese judoka. She was coached by Toshihiko Koga, who is a gold medalist at the Barcelona Olympics and a silver medalist at the Atlanta Olympics Men's Judo. Tanimoto won the Women's ‍–‍63 kg category gold medal at the Athens Olympics in 2004 and at the Beijing Olympics in 2008.

In September 2005, she won the silver medal at the World judo championships in Cairo, Egypt.

== Retirement ==
Tanimoto retired from competitive judo in September 2010. In 2015, she became the assistant manager of Komatsu's judo club. For the Rio 2016 Olympics, she was a coach for the women's judo team. She is completing a postgraduate degree at Hirosaki University, and listed as a women's junior coach for the All Japan Judo Federation. Additionally, she was a board member of the Tokyo 2020 Organizing Committee.

== See also ==
- List of Olympic medalists in judo
