= Dina Maksutova =

Soviet judoka

Personal information
- Nationality: Soviet
- Born: 7 December 1969 (age 55)

Sport
- Sport: Judo

Dina Maksutova (born 7 December 1969) is a Kyrgyzstan judoka. She competed in the women's half-lightweight event at the 1992 Summer Olympics.
