= Tomaž Tomšič =

Slovenian handball player

Tomaž Tomšič (born 17 August 1972 in Postojna) is a Slovenian handball player who competed in the 2000 Summer Olympics and in the 2004 Summer Olympics. He spent most of his career (from 19 years old) in handball club Celje Pivovarna Laško and a couple of years in France. Tomaž is still one of the players that represented the country the most with a little over 200 games for Slovenian national team. He has two children twins Ema and Tim Tomšič with his wife Karmen Tomšič.
