= Anja von Rekowski =

German judoka

Medal record

Women's judo

Representing Germany

World Championships
Silver medal – second place	1997 Paris	-66 kg

European Championships
Bronze medal – third place	1996 The Hague	-66 kg

Anja von Rekowski (born 13 December 1975 in Celle) is a German former judoka who competed in the 1996 Summer Olympics and in the 2000 Summer Olympics.
