= Beno Lapajne =

Slovenian handball player

Personal information
- Born: 10 June 1973 (age 52) Ljubljana, SFR Yugoslavia

Beno Lapajne (born 10 June 1973) is a former professional handball player. He has taken part in many international events, including the Athens Olympics in 2004 and Sydney Olympics in 2000.

He started his career in the handball club RK Inles – Ribnica. He later played in clubs Celje, Gorenje, Prule 67, US Ivry, Gold Club, Zagreb and BM Aragon. Lapajne has won 8 Slovenian Championships and 9 Slovenian Cups, 1 Croatian Championship and 1 Croatian Cup and was a runner-up at the 2004 European Men's Handball Championship.

Olympic Games
Preceded by Iztok Čop	Flagbearer for Slovenia; Athens 2004	Succeeded by Urška Žolnir
