= Lisa Boscarino =

Puerto Rican judoka (born 1961)

Personal information
- Nationality: Puerto Rican
- Born: 18 May 1961 (age 65)

Sport
- Sport: Judo
Medal record
Representing Puerto Rico
Pan American Games
Gold medal – first place	1987 Indianapolis	Half-lightweight
Bronze medal – third place	1991 Havana	Half-lightweight
Central American and Caribbean Games
Gold medal – first place	1986 Santiago	Half-lightweight

Lisa Boscarino Pagán (born 18 May 1961) is a Puerto Rican judoka. She competed in the women's half-lightweight event at the 1992 Summer Olympics.
