= Matija Pavšič =

Slovenian rower

Personal information
- Nationality: Slovenian
- Born: 13 November 1979 (age 45); Koper, Yugoslavia

Sport
- Sport: Rowing

Matija Pavšič (born 13 November 1979) is a Slovenian rower. He competed in the men's coxless pair event at the 2004 Summer Olympics.
