= Daniëlle Vriezema =

Dutch Olympic judoka

Personal information
- Born: 25 March 1977 (age 49) Arnhem, Netherlands

Sport
- Sport: Judo
Medal record
Representing Netherlands
Summer Universiade
Gold medal – first place	1999 Palma de Mallorca	Half middleweight

Daniëlle Esmeralda Vriezema (born 25 March 1977) is a Dutch former judoka who competed in the 2000 Summer Olympics.
