= Son Un-hui =

North Korean gymnast

Personal information
- Nationality: North Korean
- Born: 13 December 1981 (age 43)

Sport
- Sport: Gymnastics

Son Un-hui (Korean: 손은희,born 13 December 1981) is a North Korean gymnast. She competed at the 2000 Summer Olympics.
