= Kie Kusakabe =

Japanese judoka (born 1978)

Personal information
- Born: 11 October 1978 (age 47)
- Occupation: Judoka

Sport
- Country: Japan
- Sport: Judo
- Weight class: –57 kg

Achievements and titles
- Olympic Games: (bronze) (2000)
- World Champ.: (bronze) (2001)
- Asian Champ.: (gold) (2000, 2003)
Medal record
Women's judo
Representing Japan
Olympic Games
Bronze medal – third place	2000 Sydney	‍–‍57 kg
World Championships
Bronze medal – third place	2001 Munich	‍–‍57 kg
Asian Games
Silver medal – second place	2002 Busan	‍–‍57 kg
Bronze medal – third place	1998 Bangkok	‍–‍57 kg
Asian Championships
Gold medal – first place	2000 Osaka	‍–‍57 kg
Gold medal – first place	2003 Jeju	‍–‍57 kg
Silver medal – second place	1997 Manila	‍–‍61 kg
Bronze medal – third place	2004 Almaty	‍–‍57 kg
World Juniors Championships
Gold medal – first place	1996 Porto	‍–‍61 kg

Profile at external databases
- IJF: 52955
- JudoInside.com: 1019
- Updated on 1 June 2023

Kie Kusakabe (日下部 基栄, Kusakabe Kie; born 11 October 1978 in Fukuoka) is a Japanese judoka. She won a ‍–‍57 kg category bronze medal at the Sydney Olympics in 2000.

Kusakabe is a graduate of Junshin Junior College. She was an officer of the Fukuoka Prefectural Police. She retired from the police in March 2005 and got married in October 2005.
