= Carolina Mariani =

Argentine judoka (born 1972)

Personal information
- Full name: Claudia Carolina Mariani Ambrueso
- Born: 11 August 1972 (age 53) Buenos Aires, Argentina
- Occupation: Judoka
- Height: 153 cm (5 ft 0 in)
- Weight: 52 kg (115 lb)

Sport
- Sport: Judo
Medal record
Women's judo
Representing Argentina
World Championships
Silver medal – second place	1995 Chiba	Half-Lightweight
Pan American Games
Silver medal – second place	1995 Mar del Plata	Half-Lightweight
Silver medal – second place	1999 Winnipeg	Half-Lightweight
Bronze medal – third place	1991 Havana	Half-Lightweight
Summer Universiade
Silver medal – second place	1999 Palma	Half-Lightweight

Profile at external databases
- IJF: 53091
- JudoInside.com: 1862

Claudia Carolina Mariani Ambrueso (Note: In this Spanish name, the first or paternal surname is Mariani and the second or maternal family name is Ambrueso.) (born 11 August 1972 in Buenos Aires) is a retired female judoka who represented Argentina in three consecutive Summer Olympics, starting in 1992, was flag bearer in 1996 being her last Olympic Game Sydney 2000.

== Career ==
She claimed the bronze medal in the Women's Half-Lightweight (– 52 kg) division at the 1991 Pan American Games in Havana, Cuba and in 1999. She won silver at the 1995 World Judo Championships.
