= Li Shufang =

Chinese judoka (born 1979)

Personal information
- Born: 6 May 1979 (age 47)
- Occupation: Judoka

Sport
- Country: China
- Sport: Judo
- Weight class: ‍–‍63 kg

Achievements and titles
- Olympic Games: (silver) (2000)
- World Champ.: R16 (2003)
- Asian Champ.: (bronze) (1997, 2002, 2004)
Medal record
Women's judo
Representing China
Olympic Games
| Silver medal – second place | 2000 Sydney | ‍–‍63 kg |
Asian Games
| Bronze medal – third place | 2002 Busan | ‍–‍63 kg |
Asian Championships
| Bronze medal – third place | 1997 Manila | ‍–‍61 kg |
| Bronze medal – third place | 2004 Almaty | ‍–‍63 kg |
East Asian Games
| Gold medal – first place | 2001 Osaka | ‍–‍63 kg |
World Juniors Championships
| Silver medal – second place | 1996 Porto | ‍–‍61 kg |

Profile at external databases
- IJF: 52961
- JudoInside.com: 900
- Updated on 1 June 2023

Li Shufang (Chinese: 李淑芳; pinyin: Lǐ Shúfāng; born 6 May 1979, in Qingdao, Shandong) is a female Chinese judoka who competed in the 2000 Summer Olympics and in the 2004 Summer Olympics.

In 2000, she won the silver medal in the half middleweight class.

Four years later she was eliminated in the round of 16 of the half middleweight class.
