= Vânia Ishii =

Brazilian judoka (born 1973)

Personal information
- Born: August 19, 1973 (age 52) São Paulo, Brazil

Sport
- Sport: Judo
Medal record
Women's Judo
Representing Brazil
Pan American Games
Gold medal – first place	1999 Winnipeg	Half Middleweight
Silver medal – second place	2003 San Domingo	Half Middleweight

Vânia Yukie Ishii (バニア・ユキエ・イシイ, born August 19, 1973) is a female judoka from Brazil, daughter of Chiaki Ishii who won the bronze medal at the 1972 Summer Olympics in Munich.

Vânia Yukie Ishii won the gold medal in the half middleweight division (– 63 kg) at the 1999 Pan American Games. She represented her native country at two consecutive Summer Olympics, starting in 2000 in Sydney, Australia.
