= Kim Eun-hui (volleyball) =

South Korean volleyball player (born 1948)

Kim Eun-Hui
- Born: 22 September 1948 (age 77)
- Occupation: Volleyball player
- Known for: Competing in 1972 Summer Olympics

Korean name
- Hangul: 김은희
- RR: Gim Eunhui
- MR: Kim Ŭnhŭi

Kim Eun-Hui (born 22 September 1948) is a South Korean former volleyball player who competed in the 1972 Summer Olympics.
