= Olga Artamonova =

Kazakhstani Olympic judoka

Personal information
- Born: 26 September 1977 (age 49)
- Occupation: Judoka

Sport
- Sport: Judo

Profile at external databases
- JudoInside.com: 10097

Olga Artamonova (born 26 September 1977) is a Kyrgyzstani former judoka who competed in the 2000 Summer Olympics where she finished in 9th place in the women's 63 kg class.
