= Gella Vandecaveye =

Belgian judoka (born 1973)

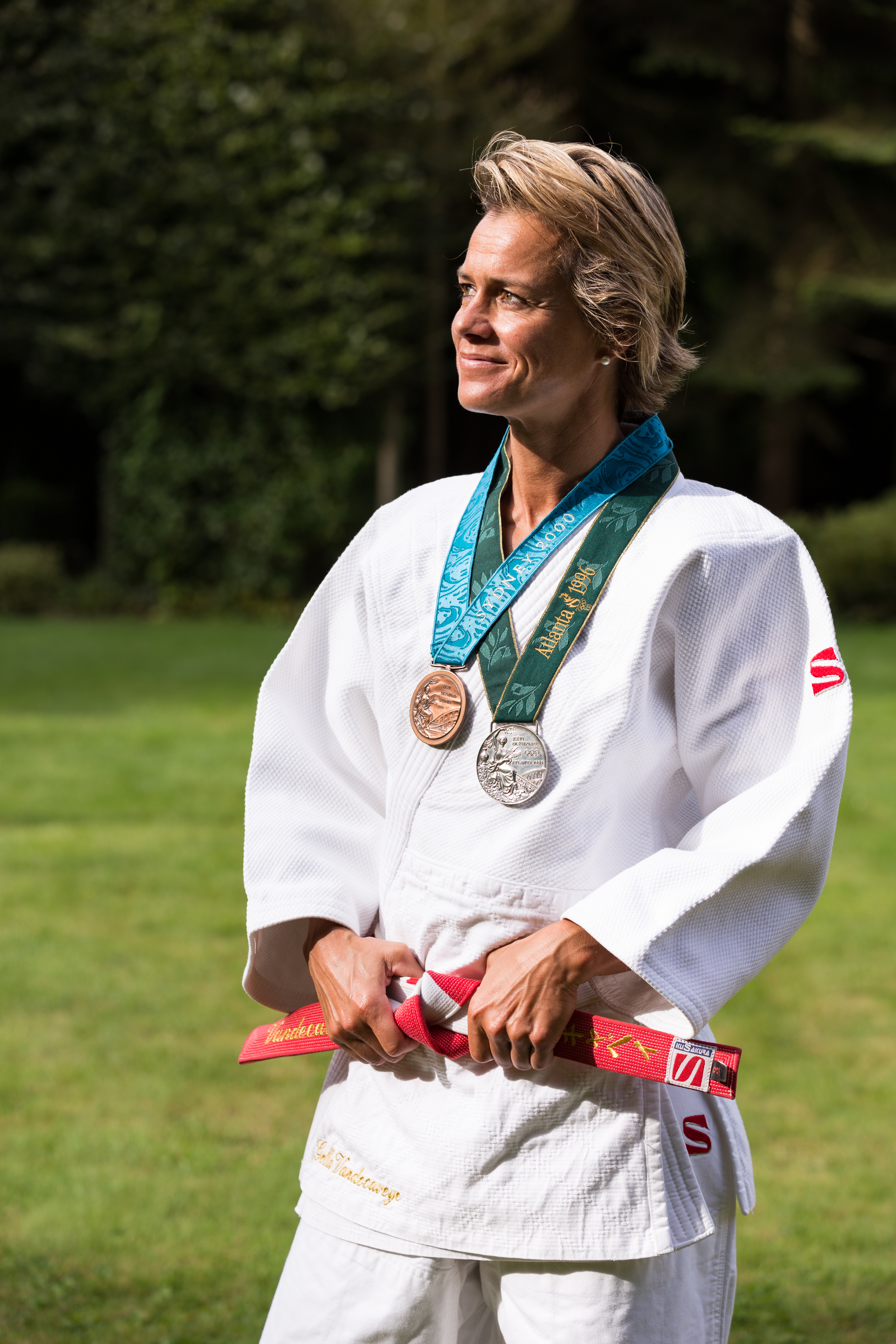

Personal information
- Born: 5 June 1973 (age 53)
- Occupation: Judoka
- Website: www.gella.be

Sport
- Country: Belgium
- Sport: Judo
- Weight class: ‍–‍61 kg, ‍–‍63 kg
- Rank: 7th dan black belt

Achievements and titles
- Olympic Games: (silver) (1996)
- World Champ.: (1993, 2001)
- European Champ.: (gold) (1994, 1996, 1997, 1998, 1999, 2000, 2001)
Medal record
Women's judo
Representing Belgium
Olympic Games
Silver medal – second place	1996 Atlanta	‍–‍61 kg
Bronze medal – third place	2000 Sydney	‍–‍63 kg
World Championships
Gold medal – first place	1993 Hamilton	‍–‍61 kg
Gold medal – first place	2001 Munich	‍–‍63 kg
Silver medal – second place	1997 Paris	‍–‍61 kg
Silver medal – second place	1999 Birmingham	‍–‍63 kg
Bronze medal – third place	1995 Chiba	‍–‍61 kg
European Championships
Gold medal – first place	1994 Gdansk	‍–‍61 kg
Gold medal – first place	1996 The Hague	‍–‍61 kg
Gold medal – first place	1997 Oostende	‍–‍61 kg
Gold medal – first place	1998 Oviedo	‍–‍63 kg
Gold medal – first place	1999 Bratislava	‍–‍63 kg
Gold medal – first place	2000 Wrocław	‍–‍63 kg
Gold medal – first place	2001 Paris	‍–‍63 kg
Silver medal – second place	1993 Athens	‍–‍61 kg
Silver medal – second place	2003 Düsseldorf	‍–‍63 kg
Bronze medal – third place	1995 Birmingham	‍–‍61 kg
Bronze medal – third place	2002 Maribor	‍–‍63 kg
European Junior Championships
Bronze medal – third place	1989 Athens	‍–‍56 kg
Bronze medal – third place	1990 Ankara	‍–‍61 kg

Profile at external databases
- IJF: 26324
- JudoInside.com: 194
- Updated on 1 June 2023

Gella Vandecaveye (born 5 June 1973 in Kortrijk, Belgium) is a judoka from Belgium who competed at four Olympic Games.

At the 1996 Summer Olympics Vandecaveye won the silver medal in the women's half-middleweight category. Four years later, at the 2000 Summer Olympics in Sydney, she captured a second medal: a bronze one in the same category. She became World Champion in 1993 and 2001 and was European champion seven times in the 1994–2001 period.

Vandecaveye was named "1999 European Judoka of the Year".

== Footnotes ==
Sporting positions
Preceded by Frauke Eickhoff; Keiko Maeda	World Judo champion (2); 1993; 2001	Succeeded by Jung Sung Sook; Daniela Krukower
Preceded by	European Judo champion - 61/63 kg (7); 1994; 1996–2001	Succeeded by Lucie Décosse
Awards
Preceded by	European Judoka of the Year; 1994; 1998–1999; 2001	Succeeded by
Preceded by Luc Van Lierde	Belgian Sports Personality of the Year; 2000	Succeeded by Jacques Rogge
