= Kim Eun-hui (diver) =

South Korean diver

Personal information
- Nationality: South Korean
- Born: 3 May 1973 (age 51); South Korea

Sport
- Sport: Diving

Kim Eun-hui (born 3 May 1973) is a South Korean diver. She competed in two events at the 1988 Summer Olympics.
