= Kim Eun-hui (judoka) =

South Korean judoka

Personal information
- Nationality: South Korean
- Born: 14 April 1973 (age 51)

Sport
- Sport: Judo

Kim Eun-hui (born 14 April 1973) is a South Korean judoka. She competed in the women's half-lightweight event at the 1992 Summer Olympics.
