= Hong Ok-song =

North Korean judoka (born 1984)

Medal record

Women's judo

Representing North Korea

Asian Games
Gold medal – first place	2002 Busan	-57 kg
Bronze medal – third place	2006 Doha	-57 kg

Asia Championships
Bronze medal – third place	2004 Almaty	-63 kg
Bronze medal – third place	2007 Kuwait City	-63 kg

Universiade
Gold medal – first place	2003 Daegu	-57 kg

- Hong Ok-song
- Hangul: 홍옥성
- RR: Hong Okseong
- MR: Hong Oksŏng

Hong Ok-song (born 16 February 1984) is a North Korean judoka.

== Career ==
Participating in the half-middleweight category (63 kg) at the 2004 Olympic Games, she finished seventh, having lost the repechage semi-final to Driulis González of Cuba.

She won a bronze medal in the lightweight category (57 kg) at the 2006 Asian Games, having defeated Khishigbatyn Erdenet-Od of Mongolia in the bronze medal match.

She currently resides in Pyongyang.
