= Andrej Hrabar =

Slovenian rower

Personal information
- Nationality: Slovenian
- Born: 12 January 1978 (age 47); Koper, Yugoslavia

Sport
- Sport: Rowing

Andrej Hrabar (born 12 January 1978) is a Slovenian rower. He competed in the men's coxless pair event at the 2004 Summer Olympics.
