= Anna Saraeva =

Russian judoka

Anna Saraeva (Анна Сараева, born 1 November 1978) is a retired Russian judoka who competed in the 2000 Summer Olympics.
