= Celita Schutz =

American judoka (born 1968)

- Born: Celita Schutz; 17 February 1968 (age 58); Houston, Texas, United States
- Style: Judo, Brazilian Jiu-Jitsu
- Teachers: Nagayasu Ogasawara, Yoichiro Matsumura, Louis Vintaralo
- Rank: 7th dan (Shichidan) black belt in Judo; Purple Belt in Brazilian Jiu-Jitsu

Celita Valerie Schutz (born 17 February 1968) is an American judoka who competed in the 1996 Summer Olympics, in the 2000 Summer Olympics, and in the 2004 Summer Olympics on the women's team. She is a graduate of Yale University. class of 1990.

Schutz grew up in River Vale, New Jersey, where seeing her brother taking a lesson convinced her to take up judo at the age of six. She began training at a young age with Sensei Ogasawara at Kokushi Dojo, in Westwood, New Jersey. She became nationally ranked at age 14 and internationally ranked at age 16. While competing worldwide, much of Celita's extended international training occurred in Japan, Spain, Germany and Brazil. She became Captain of the 1996 US Olympic Women's Judo Team; held consecutive #1 ranking in the United States for seven years; and while accumulating medals from around the world, achieved highest ranking of 5th in the World with expert coaching of Sensei Matsumura, Technical Advisor of Kokushikai, Inc.

Schutz has been a resident of Hillsdale, New Jersey, and runs the Kokushikai Judo Academy in Fair Lawn, New Jersey, and is the president of the United States Judo Association.

== Selected accomplishments ==
1996 Summer Olympics, Atlanta
2000 Summer Olympics, Sydney
2004 Summer Olympics, Athens
2x World Team Member
US Open International Champion
Multi-time International Medalist
6x US National Judo Champion (Senior Level)
2x US Olympic Committee Female Athlete of the Year, Judo
Ultimate Female Titan
2x Grapplers Quest BJJ Champion
ADCC North American Champion, 2007
Certified Personal Trainer, NASM
