= Saida Dhahri =

Tunisian judoka (born 1979)

Personal information
- Born: 18 February 1979 (age 46)
- Occupation: Judoka

Sport
- Sport: Judo

Profile at external databases
- JudoInside.com: 8796

Saida Dhahri (born 18 February 1979) is a Tunisian former judoka who competed in the 2000 Summer Olympics and in the 2004 Summer Olympics.
