= Shen Jun (judoka) =

Chinese judoka (born 1977)

Personal information
- Born: 9 May 1977 (age 48)
- Occupation: Judoka

Sport
- Sport: Judo

Profile at external databases
- JudoInside.com: 10048

Shen Jun (born 9 May 1977) is a Chinese former judoka who competed in the 2000 Summer Olympics.
