= Ji Kyong-sun =

North Korean Olympic judoka (born 1975)

Personal information
- Nationality: North Korean
- Born: 28 December 1975 (age 49)

Korean name
- Hangul: 지경순
- RR: Ji Gyeongsun
- MR: Chi Kyŏngsun

Sport
- Sport: Judo

Ji Kyong-sun (Korean: 지경순; born 28 December 1975) is a North Korean former judoka. She competed in the 2000 Summer Olympics. She later competed in the 2002 Asian Games.
