= Georgia at the 2004 Summer Olympics =

- Flag of Georgia
- IOC code: GEO
- NOC: Georgian National Olympic Committee
- Website: www.geonoc.org.ge (in Georgian and English)

in Athens
- Competitors: 32 in 10 sports
- Flag bearer: Zurab Zviadauri
- Medals Ranked 32nd: Gold 2 Silver 2 Bronze 0 Total 4

Summer Olympics appearances (overview)
- 1996; 2000; 2004; 2008; 2012; 2016; 2020; 2024; 2028

Other related appearances
- Russian Empire (1900–1912); Soviet Union (1952–1988); Unified Team (1992)

Georgia competed at the 2004 Summer Olympics in Athens, Greece, from 13 to 29 August 2004. Georgian National Olympic Committee (GNOC) sent the nation's smallest delegation to the Games since the post-Soviet era. A total of 32 athletes, 26 men and 6 women, competed in 10 different sports.

The Georgian team featured four bronze medalists from the previous games: weightlifter Giorgi Asanidze, and wrestlers Akaki Chachua, Eldar Kurtanidze, and Mukhran Vakhtangadze. Among these medalists, Asanidze managed to beat his opponents and overhaul the host nation's defending champion Pyrros Dimas for the gold in the men's 85 kg class. Other notable athletes included pistol shooter and 1988 Olympic champion Nino Salukvadze, who participated in her fifth games under three different banners (the other two were Soviet Union and the Unified Team) as the oldest and most experienced member of the contingent, and judoka and world champion Zurab Zviadauri, who was appointed by GNOC to be the nation's flag bearer in the opening ceremony.

Georgia left Athens with a total of four medals (two golds and two silver). These medals were officially awarded to Asanidze, Zviadauri, lightweight judoka Nestor Khergiani, and Greco-Roman wrestler Ramaz Nozadze.

== Medalists ==
Medal	Name	Sport	Event	Date
Gold	Zurab Zviadauri	Judo	Men's 90 kg	August 18
Gold	Giorgi Asanidze	Weightlifting	Men's 85 kg	August 21
Silver	Nestor Khergiani	Judo	Men's 60 kg	August 14
Silver	Ramaz Nozadze	Wrestling	Men's Greco-Roman 96 kg	August 26

== Archery ==
Georgia has qualified two spots in the women's individual archery.

Athlete	Event	Ranking round		Round of 64	Round of 32	Round of 16	Quarterfinals	Semifinals	Final / BM	
Athlete	Event	Score	Seed	Opposition Score	Opposition Score	Opposition Score	Opposition Score	Opposition Score	Opposition Score	Rank
Kristine Esebua	Women's individual	636	22	Kumari (IND); L 149–153	Did not advance					
Khatuna Narimanidze	Women's individual	620	41	Gallardo (ESP); L 132–148	Did not advance					

== Athletics ==
Georgian athletes have so far achieved qualifying standards in the following athletics events (up to a maximum of 3 athletes in each event at the 'A' Standard, and 1 at the 'B' Standard).

Key

- Note–Ranks given for track events are within the athlete's heat only
- Q = Qualified for the next round
- q = Qualified for the next round as a fastest loser or, in field events, by position without achieving the qualifying target
- NR = National record
- N/A = Round not applicable for the event
- Bye = Athlete not required to compete in round

Men
Track & road events

Athlete	Event	Heat		Quarterfinal		Semifinal		Final	
Athlete	Event	Result	Rank	Result	Rank	Result	Rank	Result	Rank
David Ilariani	110 m hurdles	13.72	6	Did not advance					

Women
Field events

Athlete	Event	Qualification		Final	
Athlete	Event	Distance	Position	Distance	Position
Julia Dubina	Triple jump	13.36	31	Did not advance	
Mariam Kevkhishvili	Shot put	15.06	34	Did not advance	

== Boxing ==
Georgia sent two boxers to Athens. They both were defeated in the round of 16, after one victory and one bye in the round of 32. Their combined record was 1-2.

Athlete	Event	Round of 32	Round of 16	Quarterfinals	Semifinals	Final	
Athlete	Event	Opposition Result	Opposition Result	Opposition Result	Opposition Result	Opposition Result	Rank
Nikoloz Izoria	Flyweight	Cherif (TUN); W 24–14	Aslanov (AZE); L 21–27	Did not advance			
Konstantine Kupatadze	Featherweight	Bye	Kim S-G (PRK); L 14–25	Did not advance			

== Gymnastics ==
=== Artistic ===
Men

Athlete	Event	Qualification								Final							
Athlete	Event	Apparatus						Total	Rank	Apparatus						Total	Rank
Athlete	Event	F	PH	R	V	PB	HB	Total	Rank	F	PH	R	V	PB	HB	Total	Rank
Ilia Giorgadze	All-around	9.437	9.100	9.450	9.350	9.600	9.075	56.012	22 Q	8.737	9.587	9.487	9.337	9.662	8.462	55.272	22

=== Trampoline ===
Athlete	Event	Qualification		Final	
Athlete	Event	Score	Rank	Score	Rank
Rusudan Khoperia	Women's	62.5	9	Did not advance	

== Judo ==
Men

Athlete	Event	Round of 32	Round of 16	Quarterfinals	Semifinals	Repechage 1	Repechage 2	Repechage 3	Final / BM	
Athlete	Event	Opposition Result	Opposition Result	Opposition Result	Opposition Result	Opposition Result	Opposition Result	Opposition Result	Opposition Result	Rank
Nestor Khergiani	−60 kg	Uematsu (ESP); W 1001–0010	Donbay (KAZ); W 0010–0000	Stanev (RUS); W 0120–0010	Akhondzadeh (IRI); W 0122–0011	Bye			Nomura (JPN); L 0001–0100	2nd place, silver medalist(s)
David Margoshvili	−66 kg	Georgiev (BUL); L 0012–1010	Did not advance			Demirel (TUR); W 0120–0010	Kipshakbayev (KAZ); W 0010–0001	Lencina (ARG); W 1000–0000	Arencibia (CUB); L 0000–0200	5
David Kevkhishvili	−73 kg	Takamatsu (JPN); W 0101–0010	Makarov (RUS); L 0000–0221	Did not advance		Alexanidis (GRE); W 1001–0001	Damdin (MGL); W 0011–0010	Guilheiro (BRA); L 0000–0001	Did not advance	
Grigol Mamrikishvili	−81 kg	Budõlin (EST); L 0100–0110	Did not advance							
Zurab Zviadauri	−90 kg	Lepre (ITA); W 1000–0000	Taov (RUS); W 1001–0001	Demontfaucon (FRA); W 0010–0000	Gordon (GBR); W 1000–0020	Bye			Izumi (JPN); W 1001–0000	1st place, gold medalist(s)
Iveri Jikurauli	−100 kg	Odkhüü (MGL); W 1000–0000	Belgroun (ALG); W 1010–0001	Makarau (BLR); L 0001–0011	Did not advance	Bye	Zhitkeyev (KAZ); L 0000–1000	Did not advance		
Lasha Gujejiani	+100 kg	Tataroğlu (TUR); L 0000–1011	Did not advance							

== Shooting ==
Women

Athlete	Event	Qualification		Final	
Athlete	Event	Points	Rank	Points	Rank
Nino Salukvadze	10 m air pistol	382	=10	Did not advance	
Nino Salukvadze	25 m pistol	580	8 Q	678.3	8

== Swimming ==
Men

Athlete	Event	Heat		Semifinal		Final	
Athlete	Event	Time	Rank	Time	Rank	Time	Rank
Zurab Khomasuridze	200 m freestyle	1:58.02	58	Did not advance			

== Weightlifting ==
Athlete	Event	Snatch		Clean & Jerk		Total	Rank
Athlete	Event	Result	Rank	Result	Rank	Total	Rank
Giorgi Asanidze	Men's −85 kg	177.5	2	205	=1	382.5	1st place, gold medalist(s)
Arsen Kasabiev	Men's −94 kg	155	=18	207.5	=10	362.5	14

== Wrestling ==
Key

- VT - Victory by Fall.
- PP - Decision by Points - the loser with technical points.
- PO - Decision by Points - the loser without technical points.

Men's freestyle

Athlete	Event	Elimination Pool			Quarterfinal	Semifinal	Final / BM	
Athlete	Event	Opposition Result	Opposition Result	Rank	Opposition Result	Opposition Result	Opposition Result	Rank
David Pogosian	−60 kg	Pürevbaatar (MGL); W 3–1 ^{PP}	Guerrero (USA); W 3–1 ^{PP}	1 Q	Quintana (CUB); L 0–3 ^{PO}	Did not advance	Sissaouri (CAN); W 5–0 ^{VB}	5
Otar Tushishvili	−66 kg	Rondón (CUB); L 0–4 ^{ST}	Tedeyev (UKR); L 0–5 ^{VB}	3	Did not advance			21
Gela Saghirashvili	−74 kg	Williams (USA); L 1–3 ^{PP}	Hajizadeh (IRI); L 1–3 ^{PP}	3	Did not advance			14
Revaz Mindorashvili	−84 kg	Loizidis (GRE); L 1–3 ^{PP}	Aka-Akesse (FRA); W 3–0 ^{PO}	2	Did not advance			13
Eldar Kurtanidze	−96 kg	Heidari (IRI); L 1–3 ^{PP}	Jaoude (BRA); W 5–0 ^{VT}	2	Did not advance			8
Alex Modebadze	−120 kg	Aubéli (HUN); W 3–0 ^{PO}	Kuramagomedov (RUS); L 0–3 ^{PO}	2	Did not advance			14

Men's Greco-Roman

Athlete	Event	Elimination Pool				Quarterfinal	Semifinal	Final / BM	
Athlete	Event	Opposition Result	Opposition Result	Opposition Result	Rank	Opposition Result	Opposition Result	Opposition Result	Rank
Irakli Chochua	−55 kg	Yıldız (TUR); W 3–1 ^{PP}	Adomaitis (LTU); W 3–1 ^{PP}	—N/a	1 Q	Vakulenko (UKR); L 1–3 ^{PP}	Did not advance	Rivas (CUB); L 0–4 ^{ST}	6
Akaki Chachua	−60 kg	Fucile (ITA); W 4–0 ^{ST}	Koizhaiganov (KAZ); L 1–3 ^{PP}	—N/a	2	Did not advance			9
Manuchar Kvirkvelia	−66 kg	Eroğlu (TUR); L 0–5 ^{EV}	Vardanyan (UKR); L 0–5 ^{EV}	Izquierdo (COL); L 0–5 ^{EV}	4	Did not advance			18
Mukhran Vakhtangadze	−84 kg	Abdelfatah (EGY); L 0–3 ^{PO}	Vering (USA); L 0–5 ^{VB}	—N/a	3	Did not advance			18
Ramaz Nozadze	−96 kg	Englich (GER); W 3–1 ^{PP}	Saldadze (UKR); W 3–1 ^{PP}	—N/a	1 Q	Koguashvili (RUS); W 3–0 ^{PO}	Hashemzadeh (IRI); W 3–1 ^{PP}	Gaber (EGY); L 0–4 ^{ST}	2nd place, silver medalist(s)
Mirian Giorgadze	−120 kg	Bengtsson (SWE); L 0–3 ^{PO}	Tsurtsumia (KAZ); W 3–1 ^{PP}	Koutsioumpas (GRE); L 0–3 ^{PO}	4	Did not advance			15
