= Slovakia at the 2004 Summer Olympics =

- IOC code: SVK
- NOC: Slovak Olympic and Sports Committee
- Website: www.olympic.sk (in Slovak)

in Athens
- Competitors: 64 in 13 sports
- Flag bearer: Michal Martikán
- Medals Ranked 29th: Gold 2 Silver 2 Bronze 2 Total 6

Summer Olympics appearances (overview)
- 1996; 2000; 2004; 2008; 2012; 2016; 2020; 2024; 2028

Other related appearances
- Hungary (1896–1912); Czechoslovakia (1924–1992)

Slovakia competed at the 2004 Summer Olympics in Athens, Greece, from 13 to 29 August 2004. This was the nation's third consecutive appearance at the Summer Olympics since the post-Czechoslovak era. The Slovak Olympic Committee sent a total of 64 athletes to the Games, 48 men and 16 women, to compete in 11 sports. There was only a single competitor in artistic and trampoline gymnastics and sailing.

The Slovak team featured four Olympic medalists from Sydney: freestyle and butterfly swimmer Martina Moravcová, twins Pavol and Peter Hochschorner, and slalom canoeist Michal Martikán, who later became the nation's flag bearer in the opening ceremony. Along with Moravcova, sprint canoeist Peter Páleš and track cyclist Jaroslav Jeřábek were among the Slovak athletes to compete in four editions of the Summer Olympics, although they previously appeared as part of the Czechoslovak team (Pales in 1988; Jerabek and Moravcova in 1992). Other notable Slovak athletes featured professional tennis players Daniela Hantuchová and Karol Beck, rifle shooter and former Olympic medalist Jozef Gönci, and slalom kayak world champion Elena Kaliská.

Slovakia left Athens with a total of six Olympic medals, an equal allocation of gold, silver, and bronze with two each, surpassing a single short of the tally from Sydney four years earlier. While the Hochschorner twins defended their Olympic title in double slalom canoeing, Slovak athletes continued to dominate the sport, as Elena Kaliská and Michal Martikán managed to claim Olympic medals in their respective events. Jozef Gönci added a second bronze to his Olympic career in men's air rifle shooting, while Jozef Krnáč set a historic milestone for Slovakia, after earning the nation's first Olympic medal in judo.

== Medalists ==
Medal	Name	Sport	Event	Date
Gold	Elena Kaliská	Canoeing	Women's slalom K-1	August 18
Gold	Pavol Hochschorner; Peter Hochschorner	Canoeing	Men's slalom C-2	August 20
Silver	Jozef Krnáč	Judo	Men's 66 kg	August 15
Silver	Michal Martikán	Canoeing	Men's slalom C-1	August 18
Bronze	Jozef Gönci	Shooting	Men's 10 m air rifle	August 16
Bronze	Juraj Bača; Michal Riszdorfer; Richard Riszdorfer; Erik Vlček	Canoeing	Men's K-4 1000 m	August 27

== Athletics ==
Slovak athletes have so far achieved qualifying standards in the following athletics events (up to a maximum of 3 athletes in each event at the 'A' Standard, and 1 at the 'B' Standard).

Key

- Note – Ranks given for track events are within the athlete's heat only
- Q = Qualified for the next round
- q = Qualified for the next round as a fastest loser or, in field events, by position without achieving the qualifying target
- NR = National record
- N/A = Round not applicable for the event
- Bye = Athlete not required to compete in round

Men
Track & road events

Athlete	Event	Final	
Athlete	Event	Result	Rank
Miloš Bátovský	50 km walk	3:59:11	18
Peter Korčok	50 km walk	3:54:22	14
Marcel Matanin	Marathon	2:50:26	81
Matej Tóth	20 km walk	1:28:49	32
Kazimír Verkin	50 km walk	4:13:11	36

Field events

Athlete	Event	Qualification		Final	
Athlete	Event	Distance	Position	Distance	Position
Marián Bokor	Javelin throw	71.74	32	Did not advance	
Libor Charfreitag	Hammer throw	77.30	7 q	77.54	7
Mikuláš Konopka	Shot put	20.32	8 q	19.92	10
Miloslav Konopka	Hammer throw	76.16	15	Did not advance	
Jaroslav Žitňanský	Discus throw	53.30	35	Did not advance	

Women
Track & road events

Athlete	Event	Heat		Semifinal		Final	
Athlete	Event	Result	Rank	Result	Rank	Result	Rank
Lucia Klocová	800 m	2:02.17	5 q	2:00.79	6	Did not advance	
Zuzana Malíková	20 km walk	—N/a				1:33:17	22

== Canoeing ==
=== Slalom ===
Athlete	Event	Preliminary						Semifinal		Final			
Athlete	Event	Run 1	Rank	Run 2	Rank	Total	Rank	Time	Rank	Time	Rank	Total	Rank
Michal Martikán	Men's C-1	103.51	6	97.93	1	201.44	1 Q	93.25	1 Q	96.03	4	189.28	2nd place, silver medalist(s)
Ján Šajbidor	Men's K-1	95.13	6	97.76	18	194.89	10 Q	97.77	12	Did not advance			
Pavol Hochschorner; Peter Hochschorner	Men's C-2	100.13	1	100.91	1	201.04	1 Q	101.29	1 Q	105.87	2	207.16	1st place, gold medalist(s)
Elena Kaliská	Women's K-1	104.24	2	108.41	3	212.65	2 Q	103.74	1 Q	106.29	1	210.03	1st place, gold medalist(s)
Gabriela Stacherová	Women's K-1	110.08	4	114.58	11	224.66	4 Q	109.85	7 Q	164.62	10	274.47	10

=== Sprint ===
Men

Athlete	Event	Heats		Semifinals		Final	
Athlete	Event	Time	Rank	Time	Rank	Time	Rank
Martin Chorváth	K-1 500 m	1:42.383	6 q	1:43.095	7	Did not advance	
Róbert Erban	K-1 1000 m	3:30.576	6 q	3:33.481	6	Did not advance	
Marián Ostrčil	C-1 500 m	1:58.357	6 q	1:52.871	6	Did not advance	
Marián Ostrčil	C-1 1000 m	3:56.962	3 q	3:53.820	3 Q	3:54.629	7
Daniel Biksadský; Peter Páleš	C-2 500 m	1:45.860	6 q	1:44.732	6	Did not advance	
Daniel Biksadský; Peter Páleš	C-2 1000 m	3:47.263	6 q	3:46.036	7	Did not advance	
Juraj Bača; Michal Riszdorfer; Richard Riszdorfer; Erik Vlček	K-4 1000 m	2:53.256	1 Q	Bye		2:59.314	3rd place, bronze medalist(s)

Women

Athlete	Event	Heats		Semifinals		Final	
Athlete	Event	Time	Rank	Time	Rank	Time	Rank
Marcela Erbanová	K-1 500 m	1:53.508	1 Q	Bye		1:52.685	5

Qualification Legend: Q = Qualify to final; q = Qualify to semifinal

== Cycling ==
=== Road ===
Athlete	Event	Time	Rank
Matej Jurčo	Men's road race	Did not finish	
Matej Jurčo	Men's time trial	1:04:22.58	35
Martin Riška	Men's road race	5:51:28	71

=== Track ===
Sprint

Athlete	Event	Qualification		Round 1	Repechage 1	Round 2	Repechage 2	Quarterfinals	Semifinals	Final	
Athlete	Event	Time Speed (km/h)	Rank	Opposition Time Speed (km/h)	Opposition Time Speed (km/h)	Opposition Time Speed (km/h)	Opposition Time Speed (km/h)	Opposition Time Speed (km/h)	Opposition Time Speed (km/h)	Opposition Time Speed (km/h)	Rank
Jaroslav Jeřábek	Men's sprint	10.758; 66.926	16	Bourgain (FRA); L	Ng (MAS); Yang H-C (KOR); L	Did not advance					
Peter Bazálik; Jaroslav Jeřábek; Ján Lepka	Men's team sprint	45.978; 58.723	12	Did not advance							

Keirin

Athlete	Event	1st round	Repechage	2nd round	Final
Athlete	Event	Rank	Rank	Rank	Rank
Jaroslav Jeřábek	Men's keirin	4 R	5	Did not advance	

Omnium

Athlete	Event	Points	Laps	Rank
Martin Liška; Jozef Žabka	Men's madison	5	−2	15

=== Mountain biking ===
Athlete	Event	Time	Rank
Luboš Kondis	Men's cross-country	2:31:15	34
Janka Števková	Women's cross-country	Did not finish	

== Gymnastics ==
=== Artistic ===
Women

Athlete	Event	Qualification						Final					
Athlete	Event	Apparatus				Total	Rank	Apparatus				Total	Rank
Athlete	Event	V	UB	BB	F	Total	Rank	V	UB	BB	F	Total	Rank
Zuzana Sekerová	All-around	9.162	8.912	8.787	8.512	35.373	47	Did not advance					

=== Trampoline ===
Athlete	Event	Qualification		Final	
Athlete	Event	Score	Rank	Score	Rank
Katarína Prokešová	Women's	61.90	10	Did not advance	

== Judo ==
Two Slovak judoka qualified for the 2004 Summer Olympics.

Athlete	Event	Round of 32	Round of 16	Quarterfinals	Semifinals	Repechage 1	Repechage 2	Repechage 3	Final / BM	
Athlete	Event	Opposition Result	Opposition Result	Opposition Result	Opposition Result	Opposition Result	Opposition Result	Opposition Result	Opposition Result	Rank
Jozef Krnáč	Men's −66 kg	Alassane (NIG); W 0200–0000	Peñas (ESP); W 1011–0000	Meridja (ALG); W 1001–0000	Arencibia (CUB); W 1010–0002	Bye			Uchishiba (JPN); L 0000–1000	2nd place, silver medalist(s)
Zoltán Pálkovács	Men's −100 kg	Lemaire (FRA); L 0000–1000	Did not advance							

== Rowing ==
Slovak rowers qualified the following boats:

Men

Athlete	Event	Heats		Repechage		Semifinals		Final	
Athlete	Event	Time	Rank	Time	Rank	Time	Rank	Time	Rank
Lukáš Babač; Ľuboš Podstupka	Lightweight double sculls	6:22.00	3 R	6:25.75	2 SA/B	6:29.44	6 FB	6:58.78	11

Qualification Legend: FA=Final A (medal); FB=Final B (non-medal); FC=Final C (non-medal); FD=Final D (non-medal); FE=Final E (non-medal); FF=Final F (non-medal); SA/B=Semifinals A/B; SC/D=Semifinals C/D; SE/F=Semifinals E/F; R=Repechage

== Sailing ==
Slovak sailors have qualified one boat for each of the following events.

Men

Athlete	Event	Race											Net points	Final rank
Athlete	Event	1	2	3	4	5	6	7	8	9	10	M*	Net points	Final rank
Martin Lapoš	Mistral	~~34~~	27	34	33	32	27	32	30	34	33	27	309	34

M = Medal race; OCS = On course side of the starting line; DSQ = Disqualified; DNF = Did not finish; DNS= Did not start; RDG = Redress given

== Shooting ==
Three Slovak shooters (two men and one woman) qualified to compete in the following events:

Men

Athlete	Event	Qualification		Final	
Athlete	Event	Points	Rank	Points	Rank
Jozef Gönci	10 m air rifle	596	4 Q	697.4	3rd place, bronze medalist(s)
Jozef Gönci	50 m rifle prone	598	3 Q	700.5	4
Jozef Gönci	50 m rifle 3 positions	1162	=9	Did not advance	
Matej Mészáros	10 m air rifle	594	=9	Did not advance	

Women

Athlete	Event	Qualification		Final	
Athlete	Event	Points	Rank	Points	Rank
Andrea Stranovská	Skeet	66	12	Did not advance	

== Swimming ==
Slovak swimmers earned qualifying standards in the following events (up to a maximum of 2 swimmers in each event at the A-standard time, and 1 at the B-standard time):

Men

Athlete	Event	Heat		Semifinal		Final	
Athlete	Event	Time	Rank	Time	Rank	Time	Rank
Ľuboš Križko	100 m backstroke	56.62	27	Did not advance			

Women

Athlete	Event	Heat		Semifinal		Final	
Athlete	Event	Time	Rank	Time	Rank	Time	Rank
Martina Moravcová	50 m freestyle	25.69	17	Did not advance			
Martina Moravcová	100 m freestyle	55.17	8 Q	55.08	8 Q	55.12	7
Martina Moravcová	200 m freestyle	2:01.00	15 Q	1:59.96	12	Did not advance	
Martina Moravcová	100 m butterfly	58.48	4 Q	58.66	5 Q	58.96	6

== Synchronized swimming ==
Two Slovak synchronized swimmers qualified a spot in the women's duet.

Athlete	Event	Technical routine		Free routine (preliminary)			Free routine (final)		
Athlete	Event	Points	Rank	Points	Total (technical + free)	Rank	Points	Total (technical + free)	Rank
Veronika Feriancová; Katarína Havlíková	Duet	41.167	=21	41.417	82.584	22	Did not advance		

== Tennis ==
Slovakia nominated three male and four female tennis players to compete in the tennis tournament.

Men

Athlete	Event	Round of 64	Round of 32	Round of 16	Quarterfinals	Semifinals	Final / BM	
Athlete	Event	Opposition Score	Opposition Score	Opposition Score	Opposition Score	Opposition Score	Opposition Score	Rank
Karol Beck	Singles	Calleri (ARG); L 6–2, 3–6, 6–8	Did not advance					
Dominik Hrbatý	Singles	El Aynaoui (MAR); W 6–3, 6–4	Dent (USA); L 6–7^{(4–7)}, 3–6	Did not advance				
Karol Kučera	Singles	Safin (RUS); L 0–6, 4–6	Did not advance					
Karol Beck; Dominik Hrbatý	Doubles	—N/a	Nestor / Niemeyer (CAN); L 2–6, 5–7	Did not advance				

Women

Athlete	Event	Round of 64	Round of 32	Round of 16	Quarterfinals	Semifinals	Final / BM	
Athlete	Event	Opposition Score	Opposition Score	Opposition Score	Opposition Score	Opposition Score	Opposition Score	Rank
Daniela Hantuchová	Singles	Schaul (LUX); W 6–1, 6–1	Schnyder (SUI); L 6–3, 1–6, 4–6	Did not advance				
Ľubomíra Kurhajcová	Singles	Raymond (USA); L 4–6, 6–4, 3–6	Did not advance					
Martina Suchá	Singles	Petrova (RUS); L 3–6, 3–6	Did not advance					
Daniela Hantuchová; Janette Husárová	Doubles	—N/a	Casanova / Schnyder (SUI); L 3–6, 4–6	Did not advance				
Ľubomíra Kurhajcová; Martina Suchá	Doubles	—N/a	Elia / Schiavone (ITA); L 2–6, 4–6	Did not advance				

== Weightlifting ==
Three Slovak weightlifters qualified for the following events:

Athlete	Event	Snatch		Clean & Jerk		Total	Rank
Athlete	Event	Result	Rank	Result	Rank	Total	Rank
Miroslav Janíček	Men's −69 kg	125	15	~~172.5~~	DNF	125	DNF
Rudolf Lukáč	Men's −77 kg	147.5	18	187.5	=12	335	15
Martin Tešovič	Men's −105 kg	~~187.5~~	DNF	—	—	—	DNF

== Wrestling ==
Key

- VT – Victory by Fall.
- PP - Decision by Points - the loser with technical points.
- PO - Decision by Points - the loser without technical points.

Men's freestyle

Athlete	Event	Elimination Pool			Quarterfinal	Semifinal	Final / BM	
Athlete	Event	Opposition Result	Opposition Result	Rank	Opposition Result	Opposition Result	Opposition Result	Rank
Štefan Fernyák	−66 kg	Çubukçu (TUR); L 1–3 ^{PP}	Hatos (HUN); L 1–3 ^{PP}	3	Did not advance			17
Peter Pecha	−96 kg	Laliotis (GRE); W 3–1 ^{PP}	Wang Yy (CHN); L 1–3 ^{PP}	2	Did not advance			12

Men's Greco-Roman

Athlete	Event	Elimination Pool				Quarterfinal	Semifinal	Final / BM	
Athlete	Event	Opposition Result	Opposition Result	Opposition Result	Rank	Opposition Result	Opposition Result	Opposition Result	Rank
Attila Bátky	−84 kg	Kenjeev (KGZ); W 3–1 ^{PP}	Abrahamian (SWE); L 0–3 ^{PO}	Matsumoto (JPN); L 1–3 ^{PP}	3	Did not advance			10

== See also ==
- Slovakia at the 2004 Summer Paralympics
