= Judo at the 2001 Summer Universiade =

Judo competition

Judo Judo at the 2001 Summer Universiade
- Location: Beijing, China
- Dates: 23–26 August 2001

Medalists
gold medal	China (1st title)
silver medal	Japan
bronze medal	Cuba

Champions
- Men's team: Russia (1st title)
- Women's team: China (1st title)

Competition at external databases
- Links: JudoInside

The Judo competition in the 2001 Summer Universiade were held in Beijing, China from 23 to 26 August 2001.

== Medal overview ==
=== Men's event ===
Event	Gold	Silver	Bronze
Extra-lightweight (60 kg)	Masato Uchishiba (JPN)	Vakhtang Khositashvili (GEO)	Choi Min-ho (KOR)
Extra-lightweight (60 kg)	Masato Uchishiba (JPN)	Vakhtang Khositashvili (GEO)	João Derly (BRA)
Half-lightweight (66 kg)	Magomed Dzhafarov (RUS)	Murat Kalikulov (UZB)	Franck Bellard (FRA)
Half-lightweight (66 kg)	Magomed Dzhafarov (RUS)	Murat Kalikulov (UZB)	Miloš Mijalković (YUG)
Lightweight (73 kg)	Egamnazar Akbarov (UZB)	Choi Yong-sin (KOR)	Pak Chol-soo (PRK)
Lightweight (73 kg)	Egamnazar Akbarov (UZB)	Choi Yong-sin (KOR)	Kanstantsin Siamionau (BLR)
Half-middleweight (81 kg)	Kwon Young-woo (KOR)	Mehman Azizov (AZE)	Cédric Claverie (FRA)
Half-middleweight (81 kg)	Kwon Young-woo (KOR)	Mehman Azizov (AZE)	Jaroslav Švec (CZE)
Middleweight (90 kg)	Yosvany Despaigne (CUB)	Dmitri Morozov (RUS)	Francesco Lepre (ITA)
Middleweight (90 kg)	Yosvany Despaigne (CUB)	Dmitri Morozov (RUS)	Hwang Hee-tae (KOR)
Half-heavyweight (100 kg)	Keiji Suzuki (JPN)	Jang Sung-ho (KOR)	Mikhail Sokolov (UZB)
Half-heavyweight (100 kg)	Keiji Suzuki (JPN)	Jang Sung-ho (KOR)	Vital Yalovenko (RUS)
Heavyweight (+100 kg)	Dennis van der Geest (NED)	Aleksandr Mikhailine (RUS)	Abdullo Tangriev (UZB)
Heavyweight (+100 kg)	Dennis van der Geest (NED)	Aleksandr Mikhailine (RUS)	Dmytro Selezen (UKR)
Openweight	Jang Sung-ho (KOR)	Abdullo Tangriev (UZB)	Laszlo Szilagyi (HUN)
Openweight	Jang Sung-ho (KOR)	Abdullo Tangriev (UZB)	Ihar Makarau (BLR)
Team	Russia	Netherlands	France
Team	Russia	Netherlands	Japan

=== Women's event ===
Event	Gold	Silver	Bronze
Extra-lightweight (48 kg)	Danie Carrion (CUB)	Gao Lijuan (CHN)	Kayo Kitada (JPN)
Extra-lightweight (48 kg)	Danie Carrion (CUB)	Gao Lijuan (CHN)	Frédérique Jossinet (FRA)
Half-lightweight (52 kg)	Xian Dongmei (CHN)	Oxana Karzakova (RUS)	Ellenita Merle (FRA)
Half-lightweight (52 kg)	Xian Dongmei (CHN)	Oxana Karzakova (RUS)	An Kum-ae (PRK)
Lightweight (57 kg)	Yurisleidis Lupetey (CUB)	Chika Nonaka (JPN)	Zheng Linli (CHN)
Lightweight (57 kg)	Yurisleidis Lupetey (CUB)	Chika Nonaka (JPN)	Michaela Vernerová (CZE)
Half-middleweight (63 kg)	Yang Sujun (CHN)	Anaysi Hernandez (CUB)	Lee Bok-hee (KOR)
Half-middleweight (63 kg)	Yang Sujun (CHN)	Anaysi Hernandez (CUB)	Anna Saraeva (RUS)
Middleweight (70 kg)	Qin Dongya (CHN)	Catherine Jacques (BEL)	Regia Zulueta (CUB)
Middleweight (70 kg)	Qin Dongya (CHN)	Catherine Jacques (BEL)	Edith Bosch (NED)
Half-heavyweight (78 kg)	Michelle Rogers (GBR)	Claudia Zwiers (NED)	Naomi Morishima (JPN)
Half-heavyweight (78 kg)	Michelle Rogers (GBR)	Claudia Zwiers (NED)	Choi Sook-ie (KOR)
Heavyweight (+78 kg)	Yuan Hua (CHN)	Maki Tsukada (JPN)	Maryna Prokofyeva (UKR)
Heavyweight (+78 kg)	Yuan Hua (CHN)	Maki Tsukada (JPN)	Tea Donguzashvili (RUS)
Openweight	Midori Shintani (JPN)	Cho Su-hee (KOR)	Tong Wen (CHN)
Openweight	Midori Shintani (JPN)	Cho Su-hee (KOR)	Anne-Sophie Mondière (FRA)
Team	China	United Kingdom	South Korea
Team	China	United Kingdom	Japan

== Results overview ==
=== Men ===
==== 60 kg ====
Position	Judoka	Country
1.	Masato Uchishiba	Japan
2.	Vakhtang Khositashvili	Georgia
3.	Choi Min-ho	South Korea
3.	João Derly	Brazil
5.	Kenji Uematsu	Spain
5.	Ivan Chashchin	Russia
7.	Ridel Slamani	Algeria
7.	Vugar Budagov	Azerbaijan

==== 66 kg ====
Position	Judoka	Country
1.	Magame Djafarov	Russia
2.	Murat Kalikulov	Uzbekistan
3.	Franck Bellard	France
3.	Miloš Mijalković	Yugoslavia
5.	Georgery Frédéric	Belgium
5.	David Margoshvili	Georgia
7.	Vladimir Oleinic	Moldova
7.	Hend Schumacher	Germany

==== 73 kg ====
Position	Judoka	Country
1.	Egamnazar Akbarov	Uzbekistan
2.	Choi Yong-sin	South Korea
3.	Pak Chol-soo	North Korea
3.	Kanstantsin Siamionau	Belarus
5.	Sagdat Sadykov	Kazakhstan
5.	Varuzhan Israyelyan	Armenia
7.	Azar Fatullayev	Azerbaijan
7.	Ionel Nanu	Romania

==== 81 kg ====
Position	Judoka	Country
1.	Kwon Young-woo	South Korea
2.	Mehman Azizov	Azerbaijan
3.	Cédric Claverie	France
3.	Jaroslav Švec	Czech Republic
5.	Alisher Karimov	Tajikistan
5.	Farkhod Turaev	Uzbekistan
7.	Andrea Truzzi	Italy
7.	Xiao Deqiang	China

==== 90 kg ====
Position	Judoka	Country
1.	Yosvany Despaigne	Cuba
2.	Dmitri Morozov	Russia
3.	Francesco Lepre	Italy
3.	Hwang Hee-tae	South Korea
5.	Valentyn Grekov	Ukraine
5.	Anton Minárik	Slovakia
7.	Nuraddin Salimov	Azerbaijan
7.	Zurab Zviadauri	Georgia

==== 100 kg ====
Position	Judoka	Country
1.	Keiji Suzuki	Japan
2.	Jang Sung-ho	South Korea
3.	Mikhail Sokolov	Uzbekistan
3.	Vital Yalovenko	Russia
5.	Elco van der Geest	Netherlands
5.	Jean-Dominique Vanbever	France
7.	Igor Gorbokon	Ukraine
7.	Franz Birkfellner	Austria

==== +100 kg ====
Position	Judoka	Country
1.	Dennis van der Geest	Netherlands
2.	Aleksandr Mikhailine	Russia
3.	Abdullo Tangriev	Uzbekistan
3.	Dmytro Selezen	Ukraine
5.	Matthieu Bataille	France
5.	Yeldos Ikhsangaliyev	Kazakhstan
7.	Yury Rybak	Belarus
7.	Pan Song	China

==== Open class ====
Position	Judoka	Country
1.	Jang Sung-ho	South Korea
2.	Abdullo Tangriev	Uzbekistan
3.	Laszlo Szilagyi	Hungary
3.	Ihar Makarau	Belarus
5.	Carlos Honorato	Brazil
5.	Marius Paškevičius	Lithuania
7.	Koenraad Devisscher	Belgium
7.	Yohei Takai	Japan

=== Women ===
==== 48 kg ====
Position	Judoka	Country
1.	Danie Carrion	Cuba
2.	Gao Lijuan	China
3.	Kayo Kitada	Japan
3.	Frédérique Jossinet	France
5.	Tetyana Lusnikova	Ukraine
5.	Laura Manuela Moise	Romania
7.	Pak Myong-hi	North Korea
7.	Kim Young-ran	South Korea

==== 52 kg ====
Position	Judoka	Country
1.	Xian Dongmei	China
2.	Oxana Karzakova	Russia
3.	Ellenita Merle	France
3.	An Kum-ae	North Korea
5.	Ioana Dinea	Romania
5.	Fabiane Hukuda	Brazil
7.	Song Hye-eun	South Korea
7.	MIka Kazama	Japan

==== 57 kg ====
Position	Judoka	Country
1.	Yurisleidis Lupetey	Cuba
2.	Chika Nonaka	Japan
3.	Zheng Linli	China
3.	Michaela Vernerová	Czech Republic
5.	Khishigbatyn Erdenet-Od	Mongolia
5.	Sabri Filzmoser	Austria
7.	Barbara Harel	France
7.	Pak Hye-lan	North Korea

==== 63 kg ====
Position	Judoka	Country
1.	Yang Sujun	China
2.	Anaisis Hernandez	Cuba
3.	Lee Bok-hee	South Korea
3.	Anna Saraeva	Russia
5.	Karen Roberts	Great Britain
5.	Orit Bar-On	Israel
7.	Danuse Zdenkova	Czech Republic
7.	Daniëlle Vriezema	Netherlands

==== 70 kg ====
Position	Judoka	Country
1.	Qin Dongya	China
2.	Catherine Jacques	Belgium
3.	Regia Zulueta	Cuba
3.	Edith Bosch	Netherlands
5.	Kim Mi-jung	South Korea
5.	Kate Howey	Great Britain
7.	Adriana Dadci	Poland
7.	Kim Lyn-mi	North Korea

==== 78 kg ====
Position	Judoka	Country
1.	Michelle Rogers	Great Britain
2.	Claudia Zwiers	Netherlands
3.	Naomi Morishima	Japan
3.	Choi Sook-ie	South Korea
5.	Yorise Labordes	Cuba
5.	Anne-Sophie Mondière	France
7.	Jenny Karl	Germany
7.	Henar Parra	Spain

==== +78 kg ====
Position	Judoka	Country
1.	Yuan Hua	China
2.	Maki Tsukada	Japan
3.	Maryna Prokofyeva	Ukraine
3.	Tea Donguzachvili	Russia
5.	Lee Hsiao-Hung	Chinese Taipei
5.	Barbara Andolina	Italy
7.	Simone Callendar	Great Britain
7.	Dolgormaa Erden	Mongolia

==== Open class ====
Position	Judoka	Country
1.	Midori Shintani	Japan
2.	Cho Su-hee	South Korea
3.	Tong Wen	China
3.	Anne-Sophie Mondière	France
5.	Susan Somolinos	Spain
5.	Gertrud Müller	Germany
7.	Anastassia Kolkova	Russia
7.	Simone Callendar	Great Britain

== Medal table ==
Rank	Nation	Gold	Silver	Bronze	Total
1	China	5	1	2	8
2	Japan	3	2	3	8
3	Cuba	3	1	1	5
4	South Korea	2	3	5	10
5	Russia	1	3	3	7
6	Uzbekistan	1	2	2	5
7	Netherlands	1	1	1	3
8	Great Britain	1	1	0	2
9	Azerbaijan	0	1	0	1
9	Belgium	0	1	0	1
9	Georgia	0	1	0	1
12	France	0	0	5	5
13	Belarus	0	0	2	2
13	Czech Republic	0	0	2	2
13	North Korea	0	0	2	2
13	Ukraine	0	0	2	2
17	Brazil	0	0	1	1
17	Hungary	0	0	1	1
17	Italy	0	0	1	1
17	Yugoslavia	0	0	1	1
Totals (20 entries)		17	17	34	68
