= Mongolia at the 2004 Summer Olympics =

- IOC code: MGL
- NOC: Mongolian National Olympic Committee
- Website: www.olympic.mn (in Mongolian)

in Athens
- Competitors: 20 in 7 sports
- Flag bearer: Damdinsürengiin Nyamkhüü
- Medals Ranked 71st: Gold 0 Silver 0 Bronze 1 Total 1

Summer Olympics appearances (overview)
- 1964; 1968; 1972; 1976; 1980; 1984; 1988; 1992; 1996; 2000; 2004; 2008; 2012; 2016; 2020; 2024

Mongolia competed at the 2004 Summer Olympics in Athens, Greece, from 13 to 29 August 2004. This was the nation's tenth appearance at the Olympics, except the 1984 Summer Olympics in Los Angeles, because of its partial support to the Soviet boycott.

The Mongolian National Olympic Committee sent a total of 20 athletes, 13 men and 7 women, to compete in 7 different sports, tying its delegation count with Sydney four years earlier. In the wake of Munkhbayar Dorjsuren's transfer to the German team, three Mongolian athletes had previously competed in Sydney, including shooter Otryadyn Gündegmaa in the women's pistol events. Judoka and world champion Damdinsürengiin Nyamkhüü was appointed by the committee to become Mongolia's flag bearer in the opening ceremony, dressed in a traditional costume.

After failing to achieve a single Olympic medal from Sydney, Mongolia left Athens with only a bronze from twenty-year-old judoka Khashbaataryn Tsagaanbaatar on the first day of the Games.

== Medalists ==
Medal	Name	Sport	Event	Date
Bronze	Khashbaataryn Tsagaanbaatar	Judo	Men's 60 kg	August 14

== Athletics ==
Mongolian athletes have so far achieved qualifying standards in the following athletics events (up to a maximum of 3 athletes in each event at the 'A' Standard, and 1 at the 'B' Standard).

Key

- Note – Ranks given for track events are within the athlete's heat only
- Q = Qualified for the next round
- q = Qualified for the next round as a fastest loser or, in field events, by position without achieving the qualifying target
- NR = National record
- N/A = Round not applicable for the event
- Bye = Athlete not required to compete in round

Men

Athlete	Event	Final	
Athlete	Event	Result	Rank
Bat-Ochiryn Ser-Od	Marathon	2:33:24	75

Women

Athlete	Event	Final	
Athlete	Event	Result	Rank
Luvsanlkhündegiin Otgonbayar	Marathon	3:48:42	66

== Boxing ==
Mongolia sent one lightweight boxer to the 2004 Olympics.

Athlete	Event	Round of 32	Round of 16	Quarterfinals	Semifinals	Final	
Athlete	Event	Opposition Result	Opposition Result	Opposition Result	Opposition Result	Opposition Result	Rank
Uranchimegiin Mönkh-Erdene	Lightweight	Medor (MRI); W 29–23	Baik J-S (KOR); L 22–33	Did not advance			

== Judo ==
Eight Mongolian judoka (six men and two women) qualified for the 2004 Summer Olympics, its largest contingent in any sport, and it was rewarded with its only medal of the Games. Khashbaataryn Tsagaanbaatar won his first three matches in less than five minutes, progressing to the semifinals, where he lasted less than thirty seconds against his Japanese opponent. In the bronze medal match, there were no scores in the five-minute period, so another period was played, and Tsagaanbaatar scored with less than a minute-and-a-half remaining to win the bronze.

Men

Athlete	Event	Round of 32	Round of 16	Quarterfinals	Semifinals	Repechage 1	Repechage 2	Repechage 3	Final / BM	
Athlete	Event	Opposition Result	Opposition Result	Opposition Result	Opposition Result	Opposition Result	Opposition Result	Opposition Result	Opposition Result	Rank
Khashbaataryn Tsagaanbaatar	−60 kg	Shah (IND); W 1000–0000	Williams- Murray (USA); W 1000–0000	Choi M-H (KOR); W 1000–0000	Nomura (JPN); L 0000–1000	Bye			Uematsu (ESP); W 0010–0000	3rd place, bronze medalist(s)
Gantömöriin Dashdavaa	−66 kg	Vazagashvili (GRE); W 0100–0010	Uchishiba (JPN); L 0000–1001	Did not advance		Lencina (ARG); L 0001–1011	Did not advance			
Damdiny Süldbayar	−73 kg	Zeļonijs (LAT); W 1110–0011	Etoga (CMR); W 0010–0001	Makarov (RUS); L 0000–0120	Did not advance	Bye	Kevkhishvili (GEO); L 0010–0011	Did not advance		
Damdinsürengiin Nyamkhüü	−81 kg	Arteaga (CUB); L 0001–0130	Did not advance							
Tsend-Ayuushiin Ochirbat	−90 kg	Bayu (INA); W 0101–0001	Honorato (BRA); L 0100–0101	Did not advance						
Batjargalyn Odkhüü	−100 kg	Jikurauli (GEO); L 0000–1000	Did not advance							

Women

Athlete	Event	Round of 32	Round of 16	Quarterfinals	Semifinals	Repechage 1	Repechage 2	Repechage 3	Final / BM	
Athlete	Event	Opposition Result	Opposition Result	Opposition Result	Opposition Result	Opposition Result	Opposition Result	Opposition Result	Opposition Result	Rank
Khishigbatyn Erdenet-Od	−57 kg	Bye	Kusakabe (JPN); L 0002–0020	Did not advance						
Erdene-Ochiryn Dolgormaa	+78 kg	Lee H-H (TPE); W 0021–0001	Prokofyeva (UKR); L 0001–0200	Did not advance						

== Shooting ==
One Mongolian shooter qualified to compete in the following events:

Women

Athlete	Event	Qualification		Final	
Athlete	Event	Points	Rank	Points	Rank
Otryadyn Gündegmaa	10 m air pistol	380	=16	Did not advance	
Otryadyn Gündegmaa	25 m pistol	583	6 Q	683.4	6

== Swimming ==
Men

Athlete	Event	Heat		Semifinal		Final	
Athlete	Event	Time	Rank	Time	Rank	Time	Rank
Andryein Tamir	100 m freestyle	57.29	64	Did not advance			

== Weightlifting ==
Mongolia has qualified a single weightlifter.

Athlete	Event	Snatch		Clean & Jerk		Total	Rank
Athlete	Event	Result	Rank	Result	Rank	Total	Rank
Namkhaidorjiin Bayarmaa	Women's −58 kg	87.5	14	107.5	14	195	14

== Wrestling ==
Key

- VT – Victory by Fall.
- PP - Decision by Points - the loser with technical points.
- PO - Decision by Points - the loser without technical points.

Men's freestyle

Athlete	Event	Elimination Pool				Quarterfinal	Semifinal	Final / BM	
Athlete	Event	Opposition Result	Opposition Result	Opposition Result	Rank	Opposition Result	Opposition Result	Opposition Result	Rank
Bayaraagiin Naranbaatar	−55 kg	Nourzad (IRI); W 3–0 ^{PO}	Kim H-S (KOR); L 1–3 ^{PP}	—N/a	2	Did not advance			12
Oyuunbilegiin Pürevbaatar	−60 kg	Guerrero (USA); W 3–1 ^{PP}	Pogosian (GEO); L 1–3 ^{PP}	—N/a	2	Did not advance			13
Tüvshintöriin Enkhtuyaa	−96 kg	Çakıroğlu (TUR); W 5–0 ^{VT}	Shemarov (BLR); L 0–3 ^{PO}	—N/a	3	Did not advance			21
Gelegjamtsyn Ösökhbayar	−120 kg	Hrynkevich (BLR); W 3–0 ^{PO}	Rezaei (IRI); L 0–3 ^{PO}	Boyadzhiev (BUL); L 0–5 ^{VT}	3	Did not advance			12

Women's freestyle

Athlete	Event	Elimination Pool			Classification	Semifinal	Final / BM	
Athlete	Event	Opposition Result	Opposition Result	Rank	Opposition Result	Opposition Result	Opposition Result	Rank
Tsogtbazaryn Enkhjargal	−48 kg	Berthenet (FRA); L 1–3 ^{PP}	Ross (GBS); W 4–0 ^{ST}	2	Wagner (GER); L 0–5 ^{VT}	Did not advance		8
Ochirbatyn Burmaa	−72 kg	Vryoni (GRE); L 1–3 ^{PP}	Saenko (UKR); L 0–3 ^{PO}	3	Did not advance			10

== See also ==
- Mongolia at the 2002 Asian Games
- Mongolia at the 2004 Summer Paralympics
