= Muratbek Kipshakbayev =

Kazakhstani judoka (born 1979)

Personal information
- Full name: Muratbek Sultanbekovich; Kipshakbayev
- Nationality: Kazakhstan
- Born: 11 September 1979 (age 46) Ongutsik Qazaqstan, Kazakh SSR, Soviet Union
- Height: 1.69 m (5 ft 6 1/2 in)
- Weight: 66 kg (146 lb)

Sport
- Sport: Judo
- Event: 66 kg
Medal record
Men's judo
Representing Kazakhstan
Asian Championships
Gold medal – first place	2004 Almaty	66 kg

Muratbek Sultanbekovich Kipshakbayev (Kazakh: Муратбек Султанбекович Кипшакбаев; born 11 September 1979 in Ongutsik Qazaqstan) is a Kazakh judoka, who competed in the men's half-lightweight category. He celebrated his victory in front of the Kazakh crowd with a gold medal in the 66-kg division at the 2004 Asian Judo Championships in Almaty, and later represented his nation Kazakhstan at the 2004 Summer Olympics.

Kipshakbayev qualified for the Kazakh squad in the men's half-lightweight class (66 kg) at the 2004 Summer Olympics in Athens, by topping the field of judoka and receiving a berth from the Asian Championships in Almaty. He ran off two straight victories over Dominican Republic's Juan Carlos Jacinto and Serbia and Montenegro's Miloš Mijalković in the prelims, before falling short to Bulgarian judoka and eventual bronze medalist Georgi Georgiev with a waza-ari during their quarterfinal match. Kipshakbayev offered a chance to compete for the bronze through the repechage, but could not bounce back with an appeasing defeat from Georgia's David Margoshvili in the second playoff.
