= 1996 World Judo Juniors Championships =

Judo competition

Judo 1996 World Judo Juniors Championships
- Location: Porto, Portugal
- Dates: 3–6 October 1996

Competition at external databases
- Links: JudoInside

The 1996 World Judo Juniors Championships was an edition of the World Judo Juniors Championships. It was held in Porto, Portugal from 3 to 6 October 1996.

== Medal summary ==
=== Men's events ===
Event	Gold	Silver	Bronze
Extra-lightweight (−60 kg)	Kenji Uematsu (ESP)	Magomed Dzhafarov (RUS)	Baptiste Leroy (FRA)
Extra-lightweight (−60 kg)	Kenji Uematsu (ESP)	Magomed Dzhafarov (RUS)	Won-Yen Dong (KOR)
Half-lightweight (−65 kg)	Jozef Krnáč (SVK)	Kiyoshi Uematsu (ESP)	Bektaş Demirel (TUR)
Half-lightweight (−65 kg)	Jozef Krnáč (SVK)	Kiyoshi Uematsu (ESP)	Ryohei Tanaka (JPN)
Lightweight (−71 kg)	Sebastian Pereira (BRA)	Giuseppe Maddaloni (ITA)	Marcel Bosse (NED)
Lightweight (−71 kg)	Sebastian Pereira (BRA)	Giuseppe Maddaloni (ITA)	Yong-Shin Choi (KOR)
Half-middleweight (−78 kg)	Cédric Claverie (FRA)	Ryuichi Murata (JPN)	Gennadiy Bilodid (UKR)
Half-middleweight (−78 kg)	Cédric Claverie (FRA)	Ryuichi Murata (JPN)	Aboumedan El Sayed (EGY)
Middleweight (−86 kg)	David Alarza (ESP)	Przemysław Matyjaszek (POL)	Hiroomi Fujita (JPN)
Middleweight (−86 kg)	David Alarza (ESP)	Przemysław Matyjaszek (POL)	Martin van den Berg (NED)
Half-heavyweight (−95 kg)	Tamerlan Tmenov (RUS)	Sung-Keun Park (KOR)	Masatoshi Tobitsuka (JPN)
Half-heavyweight (−95 kg)	Tamerlan Tmenov (RUS)	Sung-Keun Park (KOR)	Iveri Jikurauli (GEO)
Heavyweight (+95 kg)	Sung-Ho Jang (KOR)	Aythami Ruano (ESP)	Tatsuhiro Muramoto (JPN)
Heavyweight (+95 kg)	Sung-Ho Jang (KOR)	Aythami Ruano (ESP)	Larbi Kamel (ALG)

=== Women's events ===
Event	Gold	Silver	Bronze
Extra-lightweight (−48 kg)	Tamara Meijer (NED)	Emi Tasaka (CAN)	Wang Jing-Ling (CHN)
Extra-lightweight (−48 kg)	Tamara Meijer (NED)	Emi Tasaka (CAN)	Yu Shu-chen (TPE)
Half-lightweight (−52 kg)	Mihoko Nakaya (JPN)	Kristel Taelman (BEL)	Tamara Dzalaeva (RUS)
Half-lightweight (−52 kg)	Mihoko Nakaya (JPN)	Kristel Taelman (BEL)	Barbara Till (HUN)
Lightweight (−56 kg)	Emmy Schapendonk (NED)	Danielle Zangrando (BRA)	Olga Fedoseenko (RUS)
Lightweight (−56 kg)	Emmy Schapendonk (NED)	Danielle Zangrando (BRA)	Hiromi Kaji (JPN)
Half-middleweight (−61 kg)	Kie Kusakabe (JPN)	Shufang Li (CHN)	Cristiane Parmigiano (BRA)
Half-middleweight (−61 kg)	Kie Kusakabe (JPN)	Shufang Li (CHN)	Nicky Boontje (NED)
Middleweight (−66 kg)	Edith Bosch (NED)	Leire Iglesias (ESP)	Risa Kazumi (JPN)
Middleweight (−66 kg)	Edith Bosch (NED)	Leire Iglesias (ESP)	Silvia Schlagnitweit (AUT)
Half-heavyweight (−72 kg)	Young-Hee Choi (KOR)	Hannah Ertel (GER)	Amanda Costello (GBR)
Half-heavyweight (−72 kg)	Young-Hee Choi (KOR)	Hannah Ertel (GER)	Cathérine Jacques (BEL)
Heavyweight (+72 kg)	Karina Bryant (GBR)	Shin-Soon Yeon (KOR)	Sandra Borderieux (FRA)
Heavyweight (+72 kg)	Karina Bryant (GBR)	Shin-Soon Yeon (KOR)	Svetlana Panteleeva (RUS)

Source Results

=== Medal table ===
* Host nation (Portugal)

Rank	Nation	Gold	Silver	Bronze	Total
1	Netherlands (NED)	3	0	3	6
2	Spain (ESP)	2	3	0	5
3	South Korea (KOR)	2	2	2	6
4	Japan (JPN)	2	1	6	9
5	Russia (RUS)	1	1	3	5
6	Brazil (BRA)	1	1	1	3
7	France (FRA)	1	0	2	3
8	Great Britain (GBR)	1	0	1	2
9	Slovakia (SVK)	1	0	0	1
10	Belgium (BEL)	0	1	1	2
10	China (CHN)	0	1	1	2
12	Canada (CAN)	0	1	0	1
12	Germany (GER)	0	1	0	1
12	Italy (ITA)	0	1	0	1
12	Poland (POL)	0	1	0	1
16	Algeria (ALG)	0	0	1	1
16	Austria (AUT)	0	0	1	1
16	Chinese Taipei (TPE)	0	0	1	1
16	Egypt (EGY)	0	0	1	1
16	Georgia (GEO)	0	0	1	1
16	Hungary (HUN)	0	0	1	1
16	Turkey (TUR)	0	0	1	1
16	Ukraine (UKR)	0	0	1	1
Totals (23 entries)		14	14	28	56
