= Murat Kalikulov =

Uzbekistani judoka (born 1978)

Personal information
- Full name: Murat Kalikulov
- Nationality: Uzbekistan
- Born: 19 August 1978 (age 47) Tashkent, Uzbek SSR, Soviet Union
- Height: 1.65 m (5 ft 5 in)
- Weight: 66 kg (146 lb)

Sport
- Sport: Judo
- Event: 66 kg
Medal record
Men's judo
Representing Uzbekistan
Summer Universiade
Silver medal – second place	2001 Beijing	66 kg
Asian Championships
Bronze medal – third place	2004 Almaty	66 kg

Murat Kalikulov (Uzbek: Мурат Каликулов; born August 19, 1978, in Tashkent) is an Uzbek judoka, who competed in the men's half-lightweight category. He held the 2004 Uzbek senior title in his own division, picked up five medals in his career, including a silver from the 2001 Summer Universiade in Beijing, and represented his nation Uzbekistan in the 66-kg class at the 2004 Summer Olympics.

Kalikulov emerged himself into the international scene at the 2001 Summer Universiade in Beijing, where he earned a silver medal in the 66-kg division, losing the final match to Russia's Magomed Dzhafarov by ippon.

At the 2004 Summer Olympics in Athens, Kalikulov qualified for the Uzbek squad in the men's half-lightweight class (66 kg), by placing third and receiving a berth from the Asian Championships in Almaty, Kazakhstan. He lost his opening match to Serbia and Montenegro's Miloš Mijalković, who scored more points on waza-ari and koka for a victory and threw him down the tatami with an obitori gaeshi (belt-grab throw) throughout the five-minute limit.
