= João Pina =

Portuguese judoka

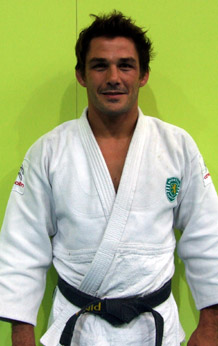

Personal information
- Full name: João Alexandre Ferreira de Pina
- Born: 31 July 1981 (age 44)
- Occupation: Judoka

Sport
- Country: Portugal
- Sport: Judo
- Weight class: –66 kg, –73 kg

Achievements and titles
- Olympic Games: 7th (2004)
- World Champ.: 5th (2003)
- European Champ.: (gold) (2010, 2011)
Medal record
Men's judo
Representing Portugal
European Championships
Gold medal – first place	2010 Vienna	–73 kg
Gold medal – first place	2011 Istanbul	–73 kg
IJF Grand Slam
Silver medal – second place	2011 Rio de Janeiro	–73 kg
IJF Grand Prix
Gold medal – first place	2010 Rotterdam	–73 kg
Bronze medal – third place	2010 Düsseldorf	–73 kg
European Junior Championships
Silver medal – second place	2000 Nicosia	–66 kg

Profile at external databases
- IJF: 2323
- JudoInside.com: 6684
- Updated on 17 February 2022

João Alexandre Ferreira de Pina (born 13 July 1981) is a Portuguese judoka. He won consecutive European titles in the under-73 kg category at the 2010 and 2011 European Judo Championships.

He has competed three times at the Olympics. He finished in 7th in 2004 in the -66 kg category, losing to eventual bronze medalist Yordanis Arencibia. Moving up to the -73 kg category, he finished 13th at the 2008 Summer Olympics, and 16th at the 2012 Summer Olympics.

== Achievements ==
Year	Tournament	Place	Weight class
2011	European Judo Championships	1st	Lightweight (73 kg)
2010	European Judo Championships	1st	Lightweight (73 kg)
2007	European Judo Championships	5th	Lightweight (73 kg)
2004	Olympic Games	7th	Half lightweight (66 kg)
2004	European Judo Championships	7th	Half lightweight (66 kg)
2003	World Judo Championships	5th	Half lightweight (66 kg)
