= Judo at the 2004 Summer Olympics =

Judo Judo at the Games of the XXVIII Olympiad
- Venue: Ano Liossia Olympic Hall
- Location: Athens, Greece
- Dates: 14–20 August 2004

Competition at external databases
- Links: IJF • JudoInside

Judo at the 2004 Summer Olympics took place in the Ano Liossia Olympic Hall and featured 368 judoka competing for 14 gold medals with seven different weight categories in both the men's and women's competitions. Japan dominated the event by taking 8 gold and 2 silver medals.

Gold and silver medals in each weight class were determined by a single-elimination bracket. There was a repechage for those who are eliminated by one of the eventual semifinalists. Since there are four semifinalists, this means that four of the losers of the round of 32 (i.e., 25%) faced four of the losers from the round of 16 (50%). The winners of these matches faced the four judokas who have lost in the quarterfinals. The winners, then, of these four matches faced each other to narrow the repechage field down to two judokas. Until this stage, the repechage has been segregated into two distinct halves, with each successive competitor facing another one from the same half of the original bracket; but each of the two judokas who emerge from the repechage challenged the loser of the other bracket's semifinal. (Since these two always come from opposite halves of the original bracket, they could not have faced each other already.) The winners of these two matches were each awarded a bronze medal, making judo unusual among Olympic events in not determining a single third-place finisher.

There was controversy in the men's competition, when Iranian competitor and two-times world champion Arash Miresmaeili weighed in overweight and was disqualified before a match in which he would have faced Israeli judoka Ehud Vaks. Miresmaeili's comments strongly suggested that he had intentionally disqualified himself so as not to compete against an Israeli.

== Medal summary ==
=== Men's events ===
Games	Gold	Silver	Bronze
Extra-lightweight (60 kg)	Tadahiro Nomura; Japan	Nestor Khergiani; Georgia	Khashbaataryn Tsagaanbaatar; Mongolia
Extra-lightweight (60 kg)	Tadahiro Nomura; Japan	Nestor Khergiani; Georgia	Choi Min-ho; South Korea
Half-lightweight (66 kg)	Masato Uchishiba; Japan	Jozef Krnáč; Slovakia	Georgi Georgiev; Bulgaria
Half-lightweight (66 kg)	Masato Uchishiba; Japan	Jozef Krnáč; Slovakia	Yordanis Arencibia; Cuba
Lightweight (73 kg)	Lee Won-hee; South Korea	Vitaliy Makarov; Russia	Leandro Guilheiro; Brazil
Lightweight (73 kg)	Lee Won-hee; South Korea	Vitaliy Makarov; Russia	Jimmy Pedro; United States
Half-middleweight (81 kg)	Ilias Iliadis; Greece	Roman Gontyuk; Ukraine	Dmitri Nossov; Russia
Half-middleweight (81 kg)	Ilias Iliadis; Greece	Roman Gontyuk; Ukraine	Flávio Canto; Brazil
Middleweight (90 kg)	Zurab Zviadauri; Georgia	Hiroshi Izumi; Japan	Mark Huizinga; Netherlands
Middleweight (90 kg)	Zurab Zviadauri; Georgia	Hiroshi Izumi; Japan	Khasanbi Taov; Russia
Half-heavyweight (100 kg)	Ihar Makarau; Belarus	Jang Sung-ho; South Korea	Ariel Ze'evi; Israel
Half-heavyweight (100 kg)	Ihar Makarau; Belarus	Jang Sung-ho; South Korea	Michael Jurack; Germany
Heavyweight (+100 kg)	Keiji Suzuki; Japan	Tamerlan Tmenov; Russia	Indrek Pertelson; Estonia
Heavyweight (+100 kg)	Keiji Suzuki; Japan	Tamerlan Tmenov; Russia	Dennis van der Geest; Netherlands

=== Women's events ===
Games	Gold	Silver	Bronze
Extra-lightweight (48 kg)	Ryoko Tani; Japan	Frédérique Jossinet; France	Gao Feng; China
Extra-lightweight (48 kg)	Ryoko Tani; Japan	Frédérique Jossinet; France	Julia Matijass; Germany
Half-lightweight (52 kg)	Xian Dongmei; China	Yuki Yokosawa; Japan	Ilse Heylen; Belgium
Half-lightweight (52 kg)	Xian Dongmei; China	Yuki Yokosawa; Japan	Amarilis Savón; Cuba
Lightweight (57 kg)	Yvonne Bönisch; Germany	Kye Sun-hui; North Korea	Deborah Gravenstijn; Netherlands
Lightweight (57 kg)	Yvonne Bönisch; Germany	Kye Sun-hui; North Korea	Yurisleidy Lupetey; Cuba
Half-middleweight (63 kg)	Ayumi Tanimoto; Japan	Claudia Heill; Austria	Driulis González; Cuba
Half-middleweight (63 kg)	Ayumi Tanimoto; Japan	Claudia Heill; Austria	Urška Žolnir; Slovenia
Middleweight (70 kg)	Masae Ueno; Japan	Edith Bosch; Netherlands	Qin Dongya; China
Middleweight (70 kg)	Masae Ueno; Japan	Edith Bosch; Netherlands	Annett Böhm; Germany
Half-heavyweight (78 kg)	Noriko Anno; Japan	Liu Xia; China	Yurisel Laborde; Cuba
Half-heavyweight (78 kg)	Noriko Anno; Japan	Liu Xia; China	Lucia Morico; Italy
Heavyweight (+78 kg)	Maki Tsukada; Japan	Daima Beltrán; Cuba	Tea Donguzashvili; Russia
Heavyweight (+78 kg)	Maki Tsukada; Japan	Daima Beltrán; Cuba	Sun Fuming; China

== Medal table ==
* Host nation (Greece)

Rank	Nation	Gold	Silver	Bronze	Total
1	Japan	8	2	0	10
2	China	1	1	3	5
3	South Korea	1	1	1	3
4	Georgia	1	1	0	2
5	Germany	1	0	3	4
6	Belarus	1	0	0	1
6	Greece*	1	0	0	1
8	Russia	0	2	3	5
9	Cuba	0	1	5	6
10	Netherlands	0	1	3	4
11	Austria	0	1	0	1
11	France	0	1	0	1
11	North Korea	0	1	0	1
11	Slovakia	0	1	0	1
11	Ukraine	0	1	0	1
16	Brazil	0	0	2	2
17	Belgium	0	0	1	1
17	Bulgaria	0	0	1	1
17	Estonia	0	0	1	1
17	Israel	0	0	1	1
17	Italy	0	0	1	1
17	Mongolia	0	0	1	1
17	Slovenia	0	0	1	1
17	United States	0	0	1	1
Totals (24 entries)		14	14	28	56

== Qualification ==
Together with 366 directly qualified athletes, there were 18 invitational places, making up a total athlete quota of 386 athletes—229 men, 157 women.

An NOC may enter up to one athlete per weight category. The qualifying places were allocated as follows:

Event/Union		Location	Men	Women	Totals
World Championships		Japan	6	6	84
Unions	African Judo Union	—	3	2	35
Unions	Judo Union of Asia	—	5	3	56
Unions	European Judo Union	—	9	5	98
Unions	Oceania Judo Union	—	1	1	14
Unions	Pan American Judo Union	—	6	3	63
Host Nation (GRE)		—	1	1	14^{[a]}
Tripartite Commission Invitation places		—			15
Final Qualification places		—			7
TOTAL					386

^{a} If the host nation qualified athletes directly through the world championships or European continental qualification system, the reserved entry places were reallocated as part of the European continental qualification.

Continental qualification places is allocated through the ranking system based on the major tournaments on the continent (continental championships, qualification tournaments). More important tournaments and tournaments closer to the Olympics carried more points.
