= 1994 World Judo Juniors Championships =

Judo competition

Judo 1994 World Judo Juniors Championships
- Location: Cairo, Egypt
- Dates: 26–29 October 1994

Competition at external databases
- Links: JudoInside

The 1994 World Judo Juniors Championships was an edition of the World Judo Juniors Championships, organised by the International Judo Federation. It was held in Cairo, Egypt from 26 to 29 October 1994.

== Medal summary ==
=== Men's events ===
Event	Gold	Silver	Bronze
Extra-lightweight (−60 kg)	Giorgi Vazagashvili (GEO)	Tadahiro Nomura (JPN)	Andrey Godovnikov (RUS)
Extra-lightweight (−60 kg)	Giorgi Vazagashvili (GEO)	Tadahiro Nomura (JPN)	Martin Grasmueck (GER)
Half-lightweight (−65 kg)	Giorgi Revazishvili (GEO)	Michel Almeida (POR)	Se-Hoon Jung (KOR)
Half-lightweight (−65 kg)	Giorgi Revazishvili (GEO)	Michel Almeida (POR)	Bektas Demirel (TUR)
Lightweight (−71 kg)	Vitaly Makarov (RUS)	Joon-Hwan Kim (KOR)	Isomio Makise (JPN)
Lightweight (−71 kg)	Vitaly Makarov (RUS)	Joon-Hwan Kim (KOR)	Christophe Massina (FRA)
Half-middleweight (−78 kg)	Vitaly Krutogolov (RUS)	In-Chul Cho (KOR)	Karen Balayan (UKR)
Half-middleweight (−78 kg)	Vitaly Krutogolov (RUS)	In-Chul Cho (KOR)	Graeme Randall (GBR)
Middleweight (−86 kg)	Sung-Hwan Choi (KOR)	Iveri Jikurauli (GEO)	Carlos Honorato (BRA)
Middleweight (−86 kg)	Sung-Hwan Choi (KOR)	Iveri Jikurauli (GEO)	Dmitry Morozov (RUS)
Half-heavyweight (−95 kg)	Min-Soo Kim (KOR)	István Szasz (HUN)	Bassel El Gharbawy (EGY)
Half-heavyweight (−95 kg)	Min-Soo Kim (KOR)	István Szasz (HUN)	Naonobu Nakano (JPN)
Heavyweight (+95 kg)	Alexandru Lungu (ROU)	Mikhail Korobeinikov (RUS)	Eric Krieger (AUT)
Heavyweight (+95 kg)	Alexandru Lungu (ROU)	Mikhail Korobeinikov (RUS)	Tatsuhiro Muramoto (JPN)

=== Women's events ===
Event	Gold	Silver	Bronze
Extra-lightweight (−48 kg)	Hillary Wolf (USA)	Sarah Nichilo (FRA)	Shujiao Jin (CHN)
Extra-lightweight (−48 kg)	Hillary Wolf (USA)	Sarah Nichilo (FRA)	Galina Tomyak (UKR)
Half-lightweight (−52 kg)	Georgina Singleton (GBR)	Luce Baillargeon (CAN)	Natalia Aranovskaya (RUS)
Half-lightweight (−52 kg)	Georgina Singleton (GBR)	Luce Baillargeon (CAN)	Asma Messaoud (FRA)
Lightweight (−56 kg)	Cheryle Peel (GBR)	Inge Clement (BEL)	Masako Otsuka (JPN)
Lightweight (−56 kg)	Cheryle Peel (GBR)	Inge Clement (BEL)	Qin Xiuznan (CHN)
Half-middleweight (−61 kg)	Ilknur Kobas (TUR)	Alexandra Dauriac (FRA)	Carol Kelly (GBR)
Half-middleweight (−61 kg)	Ilknur Kobas (TUR)	Alexandra Dauriac (FRA)	Lyudmila Kristea (MDA)
Middleweight (−66 kg)	Úrsula Martin (ESP)	Oxana Kosogor (RUS)	E. Jinhong (CHN)
Middleweight (−66 kg)	Úrsula Martin (ESP)	Oxana Kosogor (RUS)	Andrea Neumaier (GER)
Half-heavyweight (−72 kg)	Carine Varlez (FRA)	Tomoe Nakamura (JPN)	Hannah Ertel (GER)
Half-heavyweight (−72 kg)	Carine Varlez (FRA)	Tomoe Nakamura (JPN)	Meisja Shin (KOR)
Heavyweight (+72 kg)	Yuko Tonooka (JPN)	Gabriela García (BRA)	Jamie Henry (USA)
Heavyweight (+72 kg)	Yuko Tonooka (JPN)	Gabriela García (BRA)	Lu Xiunyun (CHN)

Source Results

=== Medal table ===
* Host nation (Egypt)

Rank	Nation	Gold	Silver	Bronze	Total
1	Russia (RUS)	2	2	3	7
2	South Korea (KOR)	2	2	2	6
3	Georgia (GEO)	2	1	0	3
4	Great Britain (GBR)	2	0	2	4
5	Japan (JPN)	1	2	4	7
6	France (FRA)	1	2	2	5
7	Turkey (TUR)	1	0	1	2
7	United States (USA)	1	0	1	2
9	Romania (ROU)	1	0	0	1
9	Spain (ESP)	1	0	0	1
11	Brazil (BRA)	0	1	1	2
12	Belgium (BEL)	0	1	0	1
12	Canada (CAN)	0	1	0	1
12	Hungary (HUN)	0	1	0	1
12	Portugal (POR)	0	1	0	1
16	China (CHN)	0	0	4	4
17	Germany (GER)	0	0	3	3
18	Ukraine (UKR)	0	0	2	2
19	Austria (AUT)	0	0	1	1
19	Egypt (EGY)	0	0	1	1
19	Moldova (MDA)	0	0	1	1
Totals (21 entries)		14	14	28	56
