= Juan Jacinto =

Dominican judoka (born 1978)

Juan Carlos Jacinto Jiménez
Personal information
- Full name: Juan Carlos Jacinto Jiménez
- Nationality: Dominican Republic
- Born: 2 July 1978 (age 48)
- Occupation: Judoka
- Height: 1.65 m (5 ft 5 in)
- Weight: 68 kg (150 lb)

Sport
- Sport: Judo
- Event: 66 kg
Medal record
Men's judo
Representing Dominican Republic
Pan American Games
Bronze medal – third place	1999 Winnipeg	100 kg

Profile at external databases
- JudoInside.com: 6734

Juan Carlos Jacinto Jiménez (born July 2, 1978) is a Dominican judoka, who competed for the extra and half lightweight categories. He won the bronze medal for the 60 kg class at the 1999 Pan American Games in Winnipeg, Manitoba, Canada.

== Background ==
Jacinto made his official debut for the 2000 Summer Olympics in Sydney, where he competed in the men's 60 kg class. He lost the first preliminary match to Algeria's Omar Rebahi, who successfully scored a single yuko within the five-minute period.

At the 2004 Summer Olympics in Athens, Jacinto switched to a heavier class by competing in the men's half-heavyweight division, despite weighing 68 kilograms. He lost again in his first preliminary match to Kazakhstan's Muratbek Kipshakbayev this time, by a waza-ari (half-point) and a sukui nage (double leg takedown).

== Beijing Olympics ==
At the 2008 Summer Olympics in Beijing, Jacinto competed for the second time in the men's 66 kg class. He received a bye for the second preliminary match, before losing out by an automatic ippon to Japan's Masato Uchishiba, who eventually won a gold medal in this event. Unlike his two previous Olympic games, Jacinto offered another shot for the bronze medal by entering the repechage rounds. He was defeated in his first match by Iran's Arash Miresmaeili, who successfully scored a yuko and a koka before the five-minute period had ended.
