= Judo at the 2004 Summer Olympics – Men's 66 kg =

Judo competition

Men's 66 kg at the Games of the XXVIII Olympiad
- Venue: Ano Liossia Olympic Hall
- Dates: 15 August 2004
- Competitors: 32 from 32 nations
- Winning score: 1000

Medalists
1st place, gold medalist(s)		Masato Uchishiba	Japan
2nd place, silver medalist(s)		Jozef Krnáč	Slovakia
3rd place, bronze medalist(s)		Georgi Georgiev	Bulgaria
3rd place, bronze medalist(s)		Yordanis Arencibia	Cuba

Men's 66 kg competition in judo at the 2004 Summer Olympics was held on August 15 at the Ano Liossia Olympic Hall.

This event was the second-lightest of the men's judo weight classes, limiting competitors to a maximum of 66 kilograms of body mass. Like all other judo events, bouts lasted five minutes. If a bout was still tied at the end, it was extended for another five-minute, sudden-death period; if neither judoka scored during that period, the match was decided by the judges. The tournament bracket consisted of a single-elimination contest culminating in a gold medal match. There was also a repechage to determine the winners of the two bronze medals. Each judoka who had lost to a semifinalist competed in the repechage. The two judokas who lost in the semifinals faced the winner of the opposite half of the bracket's repechage in bronze medal bouts.

== Schedule ==
All times are Greece Standard Time (UTC+2)

Date	Time	Round
Sunday, 15 August 2004	10:30; 13:00; 17:00	Preliminaries; Repechage; Final

== Tournament results ==
=== Final ===
Final
1	Masato Uchishiba (JPN)	1000
2	Jozef Krnáč (SVK)	0000

=== Mat 1 ===
First round
Yordanis Arencibia (CUB)	0101
Ludwig Ortíz (VEN)	0010
Heath Young (AUS)	0103
Juan José Paz (BOL)	0000
Elchin Ismaylov (AZE)	0012
Miklós Ungvári (HUN)	1010
João Pina (POR)	1100
Musa Nastuyev (UKR)	0010
Óscar Peñas (ESP)	1000
Melvin Méndez (PUR)	0000
Jozef Krnáč (SVK)	0200
Abdou Alassane Dji Bo (NIG)	0000
Amar Meridja (ALG)	1000
Amin El Hady (EGY)	0001
Ehud Vaks (ISR)	WO
Arash Miresmaili (IRI)

Second round
Yordanis Arencibia (CUB)	1001
Heath Young (AUS)	0001
Miklós Ungvári (HUN)	0001
João Pina (POR)	0011
Óscar Peñas (ESP)	0000
Jozef Krnáč (SVK)	1011
Amar Meridja (ALG)	0010
Ehud Vaks (ISR)	0000

Quarterfinals
Yordanis Arencibia (CUB)	1001
João Pina (POR)	0001
Jozef Krnáč (SVK)	1001
Amar Meridja (ALG)	0000

Semifinals
Yordanis Arencibia (CUB)	0002
Jozef Krnáč (SVK)	1010

=== Mat 2 ===
Round of 32
Magomed Dzhafarov (RUS)	0013
Alex Ottiano (USA)	0001
Bang Gui-man (KOR)	0000
Henrique Guimarães (BRA)	1001
Giorgi Vazagashvili (GRE)	0010
Gantömöriin Dashdavaa (MGL)	0100
Masato Uchishiba (JPN)	1011
Jorge Lencina (ARG)	0000
Juan Carlos Jacinto (DOM)	0000
Muratbek Kipshakbayev (KAZ)	0100
Miloš Mijalković (SCG)	0101
Murat Kalikulov (UZB)	0100
Larbi Benboudaoud (FRA)	0021
Bektas Demirel (TUR)	1100
Georgi Georgiev (BUL)	1010
David Margoshvili (GEO)	0012

Round of 16
Magomed Dzhafarov (RUS)	0101
Henrique Guimarães (BRA)	0010
Gantömöriin Dashdavaa (MGL)	0000
Masato Uchishiba (JPN)	1001
Muratbek Kipshakbayev (KAZ)	0002
Miloš Mijalković (SCG)	0001
Bektas Demirel (TUR)	0001
Georgi Georgiev (BUL)	1020

Quarter Finals
Magomed Dzhafarov (RUS)	0000
Masato Uchishiba (JPN)	1001
Muratbek Kipshakbayev (KAZ)	0001
Georgi Georgiev (BUL)	0100

Semi Finals
Masato Uchishiba (JPN)	1000
Georgi Georgiev (BUL)	0000

=== Repechage ===
Those judoka eliminated in earlier rounds by the four semifinalists of the main bracket advanced to the repechage. These matches determined the two bronze medalists for the event.

First round
Ludwig Ortíz (VEN)	1000
Heath Young (AUS)	0000
Abdou Alassane Dji Bo (NIG)	0000
Óscar Peñas (ESP)	1001
Jorge Lencina (ARG)	1011
Gantömöriin Dashdavaa (MGL)	0001
David Margoshvili (GEO)	0120
Bektas Demirel (TUR)	0001

Second round
João Pina (POR)	0030
Ludwig Ortíz (VEN)	0001
Amar Meridja (ALG)	0001
Óscar Peñas (ESP)	0020
Magomed Dzhafarov (RUS)	0001
Jorge Lencina (ARG)	1001
Muratbek Kipshakbayev (KAZ)	0001
David Margoshvili (GEO)	0010

Third round
João Pina (POR)	0002
Óscar Peñas (ESP)	0010
Jorge Lencina (ARG)	0000
David Margoshvili (GEO)	1000

Bronze medal finals
Georgi Georgiev (BUL)	0001
Óscar Peñas (ESP)	0000
Yordanis Arencibia (CUB)	0200
David Margoshvili (GEO)	0000
