= Ehud Vaks =

Israeli judoka (born 1979)

Personal information
- Native name: אהוד וקס
- Nickname: Udi
- Born: 27 June 1979 (age 47)
- Occupation: Judoka

Sport
- Country: Israel
- Sport: Judo
- Weight class: ‍–‍60 kg, ‍–‍66 kg

Achievements and titles
- Olympic Games: R16 (2004)
- World Champ.: R32 (1999, 2003)
- European Champ.: 5th (2003)
Medal record
Men's judo
Representing Israel
World Juniors Championships
Bronze medal – third place	1998 Cali	‍–‍60 kg

Profile at external databases
- IJF: 52800
- JudoInside.com: 413
- Updated on 1 February 2022

Ehud "Udi" Vaks (Hebrew: אהוד "אודי" וקס; born 27 June 1979) is an Israeli judoka.

Vaks won a bronze medal at the 1998 World Juniors Championships in the under 60 kg weight class.

== 2004 Olympics ==
In the 2004 Summer Olympics, competing in the half lightweight (66 kg) weight class, Vaks was scheduled to fight Iranian competitor Arash Miresmaeili in the first round. Miresmaeili was disqualified from the competition because he was above the allowable weight limit for his class.

It is widely believed that Miresmaili deliberately set out to be disqualified for political reasons, which is supported by his own comments: “Although I have trained for months and was in good shape I refused to fight my Israeli opponent to sympathise with the suffering of the people of Palestine and I do not feel upset at all."

Comments from Iranian officials also supported this view. The Iranian state news agency quoted Iranian President Mohammad Khatami as saying that Miresmaeili's actions would be "recorded in the history of Iranian glories," and that the nation considered him to be "the champion of the 2004 Olympic Games."

Iranian Olympic team chairman Nassrollah Sajadi told the Sharq newspaper that the government should give the athlete a $115,000 bonus for his actions, the same amount it gave to gold medalists.

Miresmaeili's disqualification resulted in Vaks being awarded a bye into the 2nd round, where he was defeated by Algerian judoka Amar Meridja.

== See also ==
- List of select Jewish judokas
- List of Israelis
- Arash Miresmaeili § Athens Olympic Games; controversy
