= Judo at the 2005 Mediterranean Games =

Judo competition

- Location: Almería, Spain
- Dates: 28 June to 1 July 2005

The Judo Competition at the 2005 Mediterranean Games was held in the Rafael Florido Sports Hall in Almería, Spain from 28 June to 1 July 2005.

== Medal overview ==
=== Men ===
Event	Gold	Silver	Bronze
60 kg	(Algeria) Omar Rebahi	(Slovenia) Rok Drakšič	(Spain) Javier Fernández (Italy) Marco Caudana
66 kg	(Serbia and Montenegro) Miloš Mijalković	(Italy) Giovanni Casale	(Turkey) Bektaş Demirel (Egypt) Amin Mahmoud
73 kg	(Spain) Kiyoshi Uematsu	(Turkey) Sezer Huysuz	(Algeria) Noureddine Yagoubi (France) Anthony Fritsch
81 kg	(Italy) Giuseppe Maddaloni	(Slovenia) Klemen Ferjan	(Morocco) Safouane Attaf (Algeria) Abderahmane Benamadi
90 kg	(Greece) Ilias Iliadis	(Egypt) Hisham Mesbah	(Italy) Francesco Lepre (Turkey) Burhan Koçan
100 kg	(France) Ghislain Lemaire	(Egypt) Bassel El Gharbawy	(Bosnia and Herzegovina) Amel Mekić (Greece) Dionysios Iliadis
+100 kg	(Turkey) Selim Tataroğlu	(Italy) Paolo Bianchessi	(Serbia and Montenegro) Obren Božović (Egypt) Islam El Shahaby

=== Women ===
Event	Gold	Silver	Bronze
48 kg	(Algeria) Soraya Haddad	(Italy) Francesca Congia	(Spain) Vanesa Arenas (Turkey) Neşe Şensoy
52 kg	(France) Annabelle Euranie	(Turkey) Aynur Samat	(Slovenia) Petra Nareks (Algeria) Lynda Mekzine
57 kg	(Spain) Isabel Fernández	(Greece) Ioulieta Boukouvala	(Italy) Laura Maddaloni (France) Fanny Riaboff
63 kg	(France) Lucie Décosse	(Spain) Sara Álvarez	(Slovenia) Urška Žolnir (Italy) Giulia Quintavalle
70 kg	(Italy) Ylenia Scapin	(Slovenia) Raša Sraka	(Spain) Cecilia Blanco (Serbia and Montenegro) Tamara Šešević
78 kg	(Spain) Esther San Miguel	(France) Stéphanie Possamaï	(Italy) Lucia Morico (Turkey) Seda Karadağ
+78 kg	(Turkey) Belkıs Zehra Kaya	(Spain) Sandra Borderieux	(Italy) Barbara Andolina (Tunisia) Insaf Yahyaoui

== Medal table ==
Rank	Nation	Gold	Silver	Bronze	Total
1	Spain (ESP)	3	2	3	8
2	France (FRA)	3	1	2	6
3	Italy (ITA)	2	3	6	11
4	Turkey (TUR)	2	2	4	8
5	Algeria (ALG)	2	0	3	5
6	Greece (GRE)	1	1	1	3
7	Serbia and Montenegro (SCG)	1	0	2	3
8	Slovenia (SLO)	0	3	2	5
9	Egypt (EGY)	0	2	2	4
10	Bosnia and Herzegovina (BIH)	0	0	1	1
10	Morocco (MAR)	0	0	1	1
10	Tunisia (TUN)	0	0	1	1
Totals (12 entries)		14	14	28	56
