= Anton Minárik =

Slovak judoka (born 1977)

Anton Minárik (born 26 December 1977) is a Slovak judoka.

== Achievements ==
Year	Tournament	Place	Weight class
2002	European Judo Championships	7th	Middleweight (90 kg)
2001	Universiade	3rd	Middleweight (90 kg)
