= 2002 European Judo Championships =

2002 Judo European Judo Championships
- Location: Maribor, Slovenia
- Dates: 16–19 May 2002

Competition at external databases
- Links: JudoInside

The 2002 European Judo Championships were the 13th edition of the European Judo Championships, and were held in Maribor, Slovenia from 16 to 19 May 2002.

== Medal overview ==
=== Men ===
Event	Gold	Silver	Bronze
60 kg	(France) Yacine Douma	(Azerbaijan) Elchin Ismayilov	(Georgia (country)) Nestor Khergiani (Russia) Evgeni Stanev
66 kg	(Hungary) Miklós Ungvári	(Slovakia) Jozef Krnáč	(Russia) Islam Matsiev (Ukraine) Musa Nastuyev
73 kg	(Belarus) Anatoly Laryukov	(Georgia (country)) David Kevkhishvili	(Italy) Giuseppe Maddaloni (Latvia) Vsevolods Zeļonijs
81 kg	(Turkey) Iraklı Uznadze	(Estonia) Aleksei Budõlin	(Poland) Robert Krawczyk (Italy) Roberto Meloni
90 kg	(Ukraine) Valentyn Grekov	(Belarus) Siarhei Kukharenka	(Netherlands) Mark Huizinga (Georgia (country)) Zurab Zviadauri
100 kg	(Netherlands) Elco van der Geest	(Estonia) Martin Padar	(Hungary) Antal Kovács (Belarus) Ihar Makarau
+100 kg	(Russia) Tamerlan Tmenov	(Portugal) Pedro Soares	(Netherlands) Dennis van der Geest (Poland) Janusz Wojnarowicz
Open class	(Netherlands) Dennis van der Geest	(Russia) Aleksandr Mikhailine	(Belarus) Ruslan Sharapov (Portugal) Pedro Soares

=== Women ===
Event	Gold	Silver	Bronze
48 kg	(France) Frédérique Jossinet	(Belarus) Tatiana Moskvina	(Italy) Giuseppina Macri (Romania) Laura Moise
52 kg	(United Kingdom) Georgina Singleton	(Spain) Ana Carrascosa	(Romania) Alina Alexandra Dumitru (Slovenia) Petra Nareks
57 kg	(Italy) Cinzia Cavazzuti	(Germany) Yvonne Bönisch	(Spain) Isabel Fernández (Netherlands) Deborah Gravenstijn
63 kg	(France) Lucie Décosse	(United Kingdom) Karen Roberts	(Belgium) Gella Vandecaveye (Austria) Claudia Heill
70 kg	(Poland) Adriana Dadci	(Netherlands) Edith Bosch	(France) Amina Abdellatif (Slovenia) Raša Sraka
78 kg	(France) Céline Lebrun	(Italy) Lucia Morico	(Ukraine) Anastasiya Matrosova (Netherlands) Claudia Zwiers
+78 kg	(Germany) Sandra Köppen	(France) Anne-Sophie Mondière	(Italy) Barbara Andolina (Netherlands) Françoise Harteveld
Open class	(Germany) Katja Gerber	(Russia) Tea Donguzashvili	(Italy) Barbara Andolina (France) Eva Bisseni

=== Medals table ===
Rank	Nation	Gold	Silver	Bronze	Total
1	France	4	1	2	7
2	Netherlands	2	1	5	8
3	Germany	2	1	0	3
4	Belarus	1	2	2	5
4	Russia	1	2	2	5
6	Italy	1	1	5	7
7	Great Britain	1	1	0	2
8	Poland	1	0	2	3
8	Ukraine	1	0	2	3
10	Hungary	1	0	1	2
11	Turkey	1	0	0	1
12	Estonia	0	2	0	2
13	Georgia	0	1	2	3
14	Portugal	0	1	1	2
14	Spain	0	1	1	2
16	Azerbaijan	0	1	0	1
16	Slovakia	0	1	0	1
17	Romania	0	0	2	2
17	Slovenia	0	0	2	2
19	Austria	0	0	1	1
19	Belgium	0	0	1	1
19	Latvia	0	0	1	1

== Results overview ==
=== Men ===
==== 60 kg ====
Position	Judoka	Country
1.	Yacine Douma	France
2.	Elchin Ismayilov	Azerbaijan
3.	Nestor Khergiani	Georgia
3.	Evgeni Stanev	Russia
5.	John Buchanan	Great Britain
5.	Cédric Taymans	Belgium
7.	Armen Nazaryan	Armenia
7.	Ludwig Paischer	Austria

==== 66 kg ====
Position	Judoka	Country
1.	Miklós Ungvári	Hungary
2.	Jozef Krnáč	Slovakia
3.	Islam Matsiev	Russia
3.	Musa Nastuyev	Ukraine
5.	Georgi Georgiev	Bulgaria
5.	Georgi Revazishvili	Georgia
7.	Lavrentis Alexanidis	Greece
7.	Hüseyin Özkan	Turkey

==== 73 kg ====
Position	Judoka	Country
1.	Anatoly Laryukov	Belarus
2.	David Kevkhishvili	Georgia
3.	Giuseppe Maddaloni	Italy
3.	Vsevolods Zeļonijs	Latvia
5.	Gennadiy Bilodid	Ukraine
5.	Yoel Razvozov	Israel
7.	Christophe Massina	France
7.	Kioshi Uematsu	Spain

==== 81 kg ====
Position	Judoka	Country
1.	Iraklı Uznadze	Turkey
2.	Aleksei Budõlin	Estonia
3.	Robert Krawczyk	Poland
3.	Roberto Meloni	Italy
5.	Nuno Delgado	Portugal
5.	Lacha Pipia	Russia
7.	Guillaume Elmont	Netherlands
7.	Florian Wanner	Germany

==== 90 kg ====
Position	Judoka	Country
1.	Valentyn Grekov	Ukraine
2.	Siarhei Kukharenka	Belarus
3.	Mark Huizinga	Netherlands
3.	Zurab Zviadauri	Georgia
5.	Winston Gordon	Great Britain
5.	Rassoul Salimov	Azerbaijan
7.	Francesco Lepre	Italy
7.	Anton Minárik	Slovakia

==== 100 kg ====
Position	Judoka	Country
1.	Elco van der Geest	Netherlands
2.	Martin Padar	Estonia
3.	Antal Kovács	Hungary
3.	Ihar Makarau	Belarus
5.	Zoltan Palkovacs	Slovakia
5.	Ariel Ze'evi	Israel
7.	Damjan Petek	Slovenia
7.	Youri Stepkine	Russia

==== +100 kg ====
Position	Judoka	Country
1.	Tamerlan Tmenov	Russia
2.	Pedro Soares	Portugal
3.	Dennis van der Geest	Netherlands
3.	Janusz Wojnarowicz	Poland
5.	Frederic Lecanu	France
5.	Laszlo Szilagyi	Hungary
7.	Aleksi Davitashvili	Georgia
7.	Georgi Tonkov	Bulgaria

==== Open class ====
Position	Judoka	Country
1.	Dennis van der Geest	Netherlands
2.	Aleksandr Mikhailine	Russia
3.	Ruslan Sharapov	Belarus
3.	Pedro Soares	Portugal
5.	Gyorgy Kosztolanczy	Hungary
5.	Aythami Ruano	Spain
7.	Alexandru Lungu	Romania
7.	Janusz Wojnarowicz	Poland

=== Women ===
==== 48 kg ====
Position	Judoka	Country
1.	Frédérique Jossinet	France
2.	Tatiana Moskvina	Belarus
3.	Giuseppina Macri	Italy
3.	Laura Moise	Romania
5.	Ana Hormigo	Portugal
5.	Nives Perc	Slovenia
7.	Julia Kriesten	Germany
7.	Ann Simons	Belgium

==== 52 kg ====
Position	Judoka	Country
1.	Georgina Singleton	Great Britain
2.	Ana Carrascosa	Spain
3.	Alina Alexandra Dumitru	Romania
3.	Petra Nareks	Slovenia
5.	Ilse Heylen	Belgium
5.	Laura Maddaloni	Italy
7.	Oxana Karzakova	Russia
7.	Tetyana Lusnikova	Ukraine

==== 57 kg ====
Position	Judoka	Country
1.	Cinzia Cavazzuti	Italy
2.	Yvonne Bönisch	Germany
3.	Isabel Fernández	Spain
3.	Deborah Gravenstijn	Netherlands
5.	Tatiana Chouchakova	Russia
5.	Barbara Harel	France
7.	Sophie Cox	Great Britain
7.	Maria Loredana Roibu	Romania

==== 63 kg ====
Position	Judoka	Country
1.	Lucie Décosse	France
2.	Karen Roberts	Great Britain
3.	Gella Vandecaveye	Belgium
3.	Claudia Heill	Austria
5.	Ioulia Kouzina	Russia
5.	Urška Žolnir	Slovenia
7.	Elsa Nilsson	Sweden
7.	Danielle Vriezema	Netherlands

==== 70 kg ====
Position	Judoka	Country
1.	Adriana Dadci	Poland
2.	Edith Bosch	Netherlands
3.	Amina Abdellatif	France
3.	Raša Sraka	Slovenia
5.	Annett Böhm	Germany
5.	Catherine Jacques	Belgium
7.	Alina Croitoru	Romania
7.	Samantha Lowe	Great Britain

==== 78 kg ====
Position	Judoka	Country
1.	Céline Lebrun	France
2.	Lucia Morico	Italy
3.	Anastasiya Matrosova	Ukraine
3.	Claudia Zwiers	Netherlands
5.	Jenny Karl	Germany
5.	Joanna Melen	Great Britain
7.	Catarina Rodrigues	Portugal
7.	Barbara Wójcicka	Poland

==== +78 kg ====
Position	Judoka	Country
1.	Sandra Köppen	Germany
2.	Anne-Sophie Mondière	France
3.	Barbara Andolina	Italy
3.	Françoise Harteveld	Netherlands
5.	Tsvetana Bozhilova	Bulgaria
5.	Belkıs Zehra Kaya	Turkey
7.	Brigitte Olivier	Belgium
7.	Lucija Polavder	Slovenia

==== Open class ====
Position	Judoka	Country
1.	Katja Gerber	Germany
2.	Tea Donguzashvili	Russia
3.	Barbara Andolina	Italy
3.	Eva Bisseni	France
5.	Catarina Rodrigues	Portugal
5.	Marie Elisabeth Veys	Belgium
7.	Tsvetana Bozhilova	Bulgaria
7.	Karina Bryant	Great Britain
