= Sezer Huysuz =

Turkish judoka (born 1977)

Personal information
- Nationality: Turkish
- Born: November 20, 1977 (age 48) Ordu, Turkey
- Occupation: Judoka

Sport
- Sport: Judo
- Event: lightweight
- Club: Istanbul BB SK
Medal record
Representing Turkey
Men's Judo
Mediterranean Games
Silver medal – second place	2005 Almeria	73kg
Bronze medal – third place	2009 Pescara	73kg

Profile at external databases
- JudoInside.com: 8293
- Updated on 7 July 2012

Sezer Huysuz (born November 20, 1977, in Ordu) is a Turkish judoka competing in the lightweight (73 kg) division. Currently, he is a member of Istanbul Büyükşehir Belediyespor. He has competed at two Olympics, reaching the third round at the 2008 Summer Olympics and the second round at the 2012 Summer Olympics.

== Achievements ==
Year	Tournament	Place	Weight class
2009	Mediterranean Games	3rd	Lightweight (73 kg)
2007	World Judo Championships	5th	Lightweight (73 kg)
2005	Mediterranean Games	2nd	Lightweight (73 kg)
2004	European Judo Championships	7th	Lightweight (73 kg)
