= Christophe Massina =

French judoka (born 1974)

Personal information
- Born: 11 January 1974 (age 52)
- Occupation: Judoka

Sport
- Country: France
- Sport: Judo
- Weight class: ‍–‍73 kg
- Rank: 5th dan black belt

Achievements and titles
- European Champ.: 5th (2003)
Medal record
Men's judo
Representing France
World Juniors Championships
Bronze medal – third place	1994 Cairo	‍–‍71 kg
European Junior Championships
Gold medal – first place	1994 Lisbon	‍–‍71 kg
Summer Universiade
Bronze medal – third place	1995 Fukuoka	‍–‍71 kg

Profile at external databases
- JudoInside.com: 372
- Updated on 13 March 2023

Christophe Massina (born 11 January 1974) is a French judoka.

== Achievements ==
Year	Tournament	Place	Weight class
2003	European Judo Championships	5th	Lightweight (73 kg)
2002	European Judo Championships	7th	Lightweight (73 kg)
2001	Mediterranean Games	1st	Lightweight (73 kg)
1995	Universiade	3rd	Lightweight (71 kg)
