= Kiyoshi Uematsu =

Spanish judoka

Personal information
- Born: 10 July 1978 (age 47)
- Occupation: Judoka

Sport
- Country: Spain
- Sport: Judo
- Weight class: –66 kg, –73 kg

Achievements and titles
- Olympic Games: 9th (2000)
- World Champ.: (bronze) (2005)
- European Champ.: (gold) (2004)
Medal record
Men's judo
Representing Spain
World Championships
Bronze medal – third place	2005 Cairo	–73 kg
European Championships
Gold medal – first place	2004 Bucharest	–73 kg
Silver medal – second place	2003 Düsseldorf	–73 kg
Silver medal – second place	2008 Lisbon	–73 kg
IJF Grand Prix
Silver medal – second place	2011 Düsseldorf	–73 kg
Silver medal – second place	2013 Jeju	–73 kg
Bronze medal – third place	2009 Qingdao	–73 kg
Bronze medal – third place	2011 Abu Dhabi	–73 kg
Bronze medal – third place	2011 Amsterdam	–73 kg
Bronze medal – third place	2013 Miami	–73 kg
World Juniors Championships
Silver medal – second place	1996 Porto	–65 kg
European Junior Championships
Gold medal – first place	1996 Monte Carlo	–65 kg
Bronze medal – third place	1997 Ljubljana	–65 kg
Mediterranean Games
Gold medal – first place	2005 Almeria	–73 kg
Bronze medal – third place	2009 Pescara	–73 kg

Profile at external databases
- IJF: 471
- JudoInside.com: 640
- Updated on 16 November 2022

Kiyoshi Uematsu Treviño (born 10 July 1978 in Portugalete, Spain) is a Spanish judoka. His father is Japanese and his mother is Spanish. His older brother, Kenji, is also a professional judoka.

== Achievements ==
Year	Tournament	Place	Weight class
2008	European Championships	2nd	Lightweight (73 kg)
2005	World Judo Championships	3rd	Lightweight (73 kg)
2005	Mediterranean Games	1st	Lightweight (73 kg)
2004	European Judo Championships	1st	Lightweight (73 kg)
2003	European Judo Championships	2nd	Lightweight (73 kg)
2002	European Judo Championships	7th	Lightweight (73 kg)
1999	World Judo Championships	7th	Half lightweight (66 kg)
