= László Szilágyi (judoka) =

Hungarian judoka (born 1981)

Personal information
- Born: 3 July 1981 (age 45)
- Occupation: Judoka

Sport
- Country: Hungary
- Sport: Judo
- Weight class: +100 kg

Achievements and titles
- European Champ.: 5th (2002)
Medal record
Men's judo
Representing Hungary
World Juniors Championships
Bronze medal – third place	2000 Nabeul	+100 kg
European Junior Championships
Gold medal – first place	1999 Rome	+100 kg
Bronze medal – third place	2000 Nicosia	+100 kg
Summer Universiade
Bronze medal – third place	2001 Beijing	Open

Profile at external databases
- JudoInside.com: 2717
- Updated on 17 February 2022

László Szilágyi (born 3 July 1981) is a Hungarian judoka.

== Achievements ==
Year	Tournament	Place	Weight class
2002	European Judo Championships	5th	Heavyweight (+100 kg)
2001	Universiade	3rd	Open class
