= Francesco Lepre =

Italian judoka (born 1975)

Personal information
- Born: 27 April 1975 (age 51)
- Occupation: Judoka

Sport
- Country: Italy
- Sport: Judo
- Weight class: ‍–‍90 kg

Achievements and titles
- Olympic Games: 13th (2000, 2004)
- World Champ.: 7th (2003)
- European Champ.: (gold) (2004)
Medal record
Men's judo
Representing Italy
European Championships
| Gold medal – first place | 2004 Bucharest | ‍–‍90 kg |
European Junior Championships
| Bronze medal – third place | 1995 Valladolid | ‍–‍71 kg |
Summer Universiade
| Bronze medal – third place | 2001 Beijing | ‍–‍90 kg |

Profile at external databases
- IJF: 52949
- JudoInside.com: 445
- Updated on 17 November 2022

Francesco Lepre (born 27 April 1975) is an Italian judoka.

== Achievements ==
| Year | Tournament | Place | Weight Class |
|---|---|---|---|
| 2005 | Mediterranean Games | 3rd | Middleweight (90 kg) |
| 2004 | European Judo Championships | 1st | Middleweight (90 kg) |
| 2003 | World Judo Championships | 7th | Middleweight (90 kg) |
| 2002 | European Judo Championships | 7th | Middleweight (90 kg) |
