= Bektaş Demirel =

Turkish judoka (born 1976)

Personal information
- Born: Visita Asanov; 8 February 1976 (age 50)
- Occupation: Judoka

Sport
- Country: Turkey
- Sport: Judo
- Weight class: ‍–‍66 kg

Achievements and titles
- Olympic Games: 13th (2004)
- World Champ.: (bronze) (1995)
- European Champ.: (gold) (2004)
Medal record
Men's judo
Representing Turkey
World Championships
Bronze medal – third place	1995 Chiba	‍–‍65 kg
European Championships
Gold medal – first place	2004 Bucharest	‍–‍66 kg
Bronze medal – third place	1995 Birmingham	‍–‍65 kg
World Juniors Championships
Bronze medal – third place	1994 Cairo	‍–‍65 kg
Bronze medal – third place	1996 Porto	‍–‍65 kg
European Junior Championships
Gold medal – first place	1994 Lisbon	‍–‍65 kg
Mediterranean Games
Bronze medal – third place	2005 Almería	‍–‍66 kg

Profile at external databases
- IJF: 37261
- JudoInside.com: 3535
- Updated on 17 November 2022

Bektaş Demirel (born 8 February 1976 as Visita Asanov in the Soviet Union) is a Turkish judoka. He competed at the 1996 Summer Olympics and the 2004 Summer Olympics.

== Achievements ==
Year	Tournament	Place	Weight class
2005	Mediterranean Games	3rd	Half lightweight (66 kg)
2004	European Judo Championships	1st	Half lightweight (66 kg)
1996	European Judo Championships	7th	Half lightweight (65 kg)
1995	World Judo Championships	3rd	Half lightweight (65 kg)
1995	European Judo Championships	3rd	Half lightweight (65 kg)
