= Ghislain Lemaire =

French judoka (born 1972)

Personal information
- Born: 7 August 1972 (age 53)
- Occupation: Judoka

Sport
- Country: France
- Sport: Judo
- Weight class: ‍–‍95 kg, ‍–‍100 kg

Achievements and titles
- Olympic Games: 7th (2004)
- World Champ.: (silver) (2003)
- European Champ.: (silver) (1997, 2001)
Medal record
Men's judo
Representing France
World Championships
Silver medal – second place	2003 Osaka	‍–‍100 kg
Bronze medal – third place	1997 Paris	‍–‍95 kg
European Championships
Silver medal – second place	1997 Oostende	‍–‍95 kg
Silver medal – second place	2001 Paris	‍–‍100 kg
Bronze medal – third place	1996 The Hague	‍–‍95 kg
Bronze medal – third place	2004 Bucharest	‍–‍100 kg
World Juniors Championships
Bronze medal – third place	1992 Buenos Aires	‍–‍86 kg
European Junior Championships
Silver medal – second place	1992 Jerusalem	‍–‍86 kg

Profile at external databases
- IJF: 53043
- JudoInside.com: 370
- Updated on 17 November 2022

Ghislain Lemaire (born 7 August 1972 in Lure, Haute-Saône) is a French judoka.

== Achievements ==
Year	Tournament	Place	Weight class
2005	Mediterranean Games	1st	Half heavyweight (100 kg)
2004	Olympic Games	7th	Half heavyweight (100 kg)
2004	European Judo Championships	3rd	Half heavyweight (100 kg)
2003	World Judo Championships	2nd	Half heavyweight (100 kg)
2001	World Judo Championships	5th	Half heavyweight (100 kg)
2001	European Judo Championships	2nd	Half heavyweight (100 kg)
2000	European Judo Championships	7th	Half heavyweight (100 kg)
1998	European Judo Championships	5th	Half heavyweight (100 kg)
1997	World Judo Championships	3rd	Half heavyweight (95 kg)
1997	European Judo Championships	2nd	Half heavyweight (95 kg)
1996	European Judo Championships	3rd	Half heavyweight (95 kg)
