= Magomed Dzhafarov =

Russian judoka (born 1976)

Personal information
- Born: 18 June 1976 (age 50)
- Occupation: Judoka

Sport
- Country: Russia
- Sport: Judo
- Weight class: ‍–‍66 kg

Achievements and titles
- Olympic Games: 9th (2004)
- World Champ.: (bronze) (2003)
- European Champ.: 5th (2003)
Medal record
Men's judo
Representing Russia
World Championships
Bronze medal – third place	2003 Osaka	‍–‍66 kg
World Juniors Championships
Silver medal – second place	1996 Porto	‍–‍60 kg
Summer Universiade
Gold medal – first place	2001 Beijing	‍–‍66 kg

Profile at external databases
- IJF: 52802
- JudoInside.com: 562
- Updated on 19 November 2022

Magomed Radzhabovich Dzhafarov (Russian: Магомед Раджабович Джафаров; born 18 June 1976) is a Russian judoka.

== Achievements ==
Year	Tournament	Place	Weight class
2003	World Judo Championships	3rd	Half lightweight (66 kg)
2003	European Judo Championships	5th	Half lightweight (66 kg)
2001	Universiade	1st	Half lightweight (65 kg)
1997	World Judo Championships	5th	Half lightweight (65 kg)
