= Sandra Borderieux =

French-Spanish judoka

Personal information
- Born: 30 January 1979 (age 47)
- Occupation: Judoka

Sport
- Sport: Judo

Profile at external databases
- JudoInside.com: 6433

Sandra Borderieux (born 30 January 1979) is a French-Spanish judoka.

== Achievements ==
Year	Tournament	Place	Weight Class
2005	European Championships	7th	Heavyweight (+78 kg)
2005	Mediterranean Games	2nd	Heavyweight (+78 kg)
2001	Mediterranean Games	2nd	Heavyweight (+78 kg)
