= Óscar Peñas =

Spanish judoka

Personal information
- Full name: Óscar Peñas García
- Born: 17 November 1974 (age 51) Madrid, Spain
- Occupation: Judoka

Sport
- Country: Spain
- Sport: Judo
- Weight class: ‍–‍60 kg, ‍–‍66 kg

Achievements and titles
- Olympic Games: 5th (2004)
- World Champ.: 5th (2005)
- European Champ.: (gold) (1999)
Medal record
Men's judo
Representing Spain
European Championships
Gold medal – first place	1999 Bratislava	‍–‍60 kg
Bronze medal – third place	1998 Oviedo	‍–‍60 kg
Bronze medal – third place	2004 Bucharest	‍–‍66 kg

Profile at external databases
- IJF: 52673
- JudoInside.com: 631
- Updated on 17 November 2022

Óscar Peñas García (Note: In this Spanish name, the first or paternal surname is Peñas and the second or maternal family name is García.) (born 17 November 1974 in Madrid) is a male judoka from Spain, who competed in three consecutive Summer Olympics: 2000, 2004, and 2008. He was the 1999 European Judo Champion in the extra lightweight (60 kg) division.

== Achievements ==
Year	Tournament	Place	Weight class
2005	World Judo Championships	5th	Half lightweight (66 kg)
2004	Olympic Games	5th	Half lightweight (66 kg)
2004	European Judo Championships	3rd	Half lightweight (66 kg)
2001	World Judo Championships	7th	Extra lightweight (60 kg)
1999	European Judo Championships	1st	Extra lightweight (60 kg)
1998	European Judo Championships	3rd	Extra lightweight (60 kg)
1997	Mediterranean Games	3rd	Extra lightweight (60 kg)
