= Georgi Georgiev (judoka, born 1976) =

Bulgarian judoka

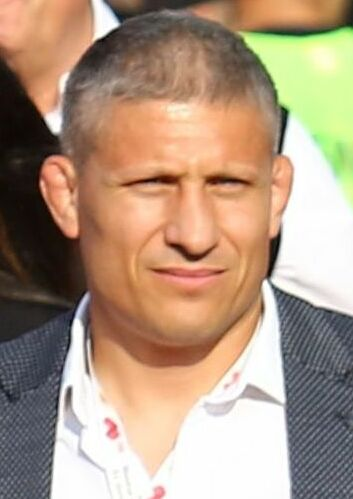
- Georgiev in 2018

Personal information
- Born: 30 January 1976 (age 50) Pazardzhik, Bulgaria
- Occupation: Judoka

Sport
- Country: Bulgaria
- Sport: Judo
- Weight class: –66 kg, –73 kg
- Club: CSKA Sofia
- Coached by: Ivan Filipov, Simeon Cenev

Achievements and titles
- Olympic Games: (bronze) (2004)
- World Champ.: R32 (1997, 1999, 2001, 2003, 2005, 2007)
- European Champ.: (bronze) (2000, 2003, 2007)
Medal record
Men's judo
Representing Bulgaria
Olympic Games
Bronze medal – third place	2004 Athens	‍–‍66 kg
European Championships
Bronze medal – third place	2000 Wrocław	‍–‍66 kg
Bronze medal – third place	2003 Düsseldorf	‍–‍66 kg
Bronze medal – third place	2007 Belgrade	‍–‍73 kg

Profile at external databases
- IJF: 3409
- JudoInside.com: 14164
- Updated on 30 May 2023

Georgi Georgiev (born 30 January 1976) is a Bulgarian judoka.

== Career ==
His career began in his native Pazardzhik under the direction of Ivan Filipov. He trained at the CSKA Army Sports Center in Sofia under the direction of Simeon Cenev. At the top level, he studied the vest wrestling styles combining judo and sambo. He won the world champion title twice, in 2003 and again in 2006. In 2000, at the Sydney Olympics, he lost in the second round to Hüseyin Özkan of Turkey. In 2004, he improved in the Summer Olympics in Athens and won the bronze medal where he lost in the semifinals against the Japanese judoka Masato Uchishiba. He ended his career in 2009.

Currently he works as a coach. at a judo club established by him in his native town Pazardzhik, called "Kodokan 2008".

== Achievements ==
Year	Tournament	Place	Weight class
2007	European Judo Championships	3rd	Lightweight (73 kg)
2004	Olympic Games	3rd	Half lightweight (66 kg)
2003	European Judo Championships	3rd	Half lightweight (66 kg)
2002	European Judo Championships	5th	Half lightweight (66 kg)
2001	European Judo Championships	7th	Half lightweight (66 kg)
2000	European Judo Championships	3rd	Half lightweight (66 kg)
1999	European Judo Championships	7th	Half lightweight (66 kg)
