= Ryohei Tanaka =

Japanese artist (1933–2019)

Ryōhei Tanaka
- Born: 1933; Takatsuki, Japan
- Died: 2019 (aged 85-86)

Ryōhei Tanaka (1933- 2019) was a Japanese artist. He specialised in printmaking, through etching.

His works are in several collections, including those of the Museum of Fine Arts, Boston, the Metropolitan Museum of Art, the Cleveland Museum of Art. and the National Museum of Singapore.
