= Miloš Mijalković =

Serbian judoka (born 1978)

Personal information
- Born: 8 March 1978 (age 48) Belgrade
- Occupation: Judoka

Sport
- Country: Serbia
- Sport: Judo
- Weight class: ‍–‍66 kg

Achievements and titles
- Olympic Games: R16 (2004)
- World Champ.: 5th (2003)
- European Champ.: (silver) (2007)
Medal record
Men's judo
Representing Serbia
European Championships
Silver medal – second place	2007 Belgrade	‍–‍66 kg
Summer Universiade
Bronze medal – third place	2001 Beijing	‍–‍66 kg
Mediterranean Games
Gold medal – first place	2005 Almeria	‍–‍66 kg
Gold medal – first place	2009 Pescara	‍–‍66 kg
Silver medal – second place	2001 Tunis	‍–‍66 kg

Profile at external databases
- IJF: 361
- JudoInside.com: 7497
- Updated on 16 November 2022

Miloš Mijalković (Serbian: Милош Мијалковић, born 8 March 1978 in Belgrade) is a Serbian judoka. He participated at the 2004 Summer Olympics. At the 2007 European Championship he won sole medal for the home team, silver in the 66 kg category.

== Achievements ==
Year	Tournament	Place	Weight class
2007	European Judo Championships	2nd	Half lightweight (66 kg)
2005	Mediterranean Games	1st	Half lightweight (66 kg)
2003	World Judo Championships	5th	Half lightweight (66 kg)
2001	European Judo Championships	5th	Half lightweight (66 kg)
2001	Mediterranean Games	2nd	Half lightweight (66 kg)
2001	Universiade	3rd	Half lightweight (66 kg)
