= Zurab Zviadauri =

Georgian judoka (born 1981)

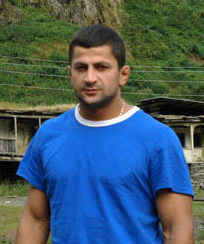
- Zurab Zviadauri in his native Khevsureti

Personal information
- Born: 2 July 1981 (age 44)
- Occupation: Judoka

Sport
- Country: Georgia
- Sport: Judo
- Weight class: ‍–‍90 kg

Achievements and titles
- Olympic Games: (gold) (2004)
- World Champ.: (silver) (2001, 2003)
- European Champ.: (bronze) (2002)
Medal record
Men's judo
Representing Georgia
Olympic Games
Gold medal – first place	2004 Athens	‍–‍90 kg
World Championships
Silver medal – second place	2001 Munich	‍–‍90 kg
Silver medal – second place	2002 Basel	Men's team
Silver medal – second place	2003 Osaka	‍–‍90 kg
European Championships
Gold medal – first place	2002 Maribor	Men's team
Gold medal – first place	2003 London	Men's team
Gold medal – first place	2012 Chelyanbinsk	Men's team
Bronze medal – third place	2002 Maribor	‍–‍90 kg
Bronze medal – third place	2006 Belgrade	Men's team
World Juniors Championships
Gold medal – first place	2000 Nabeul	‍–‍90 kg

Profile at external databases
- IJF: 4162
- JudoInside.com: 6423
- Updated on 30 May 2023

Zurab Zviadauri (Georgian: ზურაბ ზვიადაური; born 2 July 1981) is a Georgian judoka who competed in the Men's 90 kg at the 2004 Summer Olympics and won the gold medal, the first for Georgia. He is a scholarship holder with the Olympic Solidarity program. He also won two silver medals on world championships (in 2001 and in 2003) and a bronze on European championship in 2002.

Zvidauri is also signed to mixed martial arts-promotion World Victory Road, but has yet to make his MMA-debut. In 2012, he was elected to the Parliament of Georgia for the Akhmeta Municipality on a Georgian Dream coalition ticket.

Zviadauri is a cousin of another olympic champion, Georgian-born Greek Judoka Ilias Iliadis (born Jarji Zviadauri), who also won gold at the 2004 Summer Olympic games.

Zvidauri was arrested on 17 August 2021, in connection with the murder of three people.
