= Jozef Krnáč =

Slovak judoka (born 1977)

Personal information
- Born: 30 December 1977 (age 48) Bratislava, Czechoslovakia
- Occupation: Coach
- Employer: Austrian Judo Federation

Sport
- Country: Slovakia
- Sport: Judo
- Weight class: ‍–‍66 kg

Achievements and titles
- Olympic Games: (silver) (2004)
- World Champ.: 7th (2001)
- European Champ.: (silver) (2002)
Medal record
Men's judo
Representing Slovakia
Olympic Games
Silver medal – second place	2004 Athens	‍–‍66 kg
European Championships
Silver medal – second place	2002 Maribor	‍–‍66 kg
Bronze medal – third place	2001 Paris	‍–‍66 kg
World Juniors Championships
Gold medal – first place	1996 Porto	‍–‍65 kg
European Junior Championships
Gold medal – first place	1997 Ljubljana	‍–‍65 kg
Silver medal – second place	1996 Monte Carlo	‍–‍65 kg
Bronze medal – third place	1995 Valladolid	‍–‍65 kg
Summer Universiade
Bronze medal – third place	1999 Palma de Mallorca	‍–‍66 kg
Bronze medal – third place	2003 Jeju	‍–‍66 kg

Profile at external databases
- IJF: 725
- JudoInside.com: 610
- Updated on 30 May 2023

Jozef Krnáč (born 30 December 1977) is a Slovak judoka. He won the silver medal in the half-lightweight (‍–‍66 kg) division at the 2004 Summer Olympics.

Jozef Krnáč joined the Austrian Judo Federation as a regional coach in Südstadt on November 4, 2024.

== Achievements ==
Year	Tournament	Place	Weight class
2004	Olympic Games	2nd	Half lightweight (66 kg)
2003	Universiade	3rd	Half lightweight (66 kg)
2002	European Judo Championships	2nd	Half lightweight (66 kg)
2001	World Judo Championships	7th	Half lightweight (66 kg)
2001	European Judo Championships	3rd	Half lightweight (66 kg)
1999	Universiade	3rd	Half lightweight (66 kg)
