= Carlos Honorato =

Brazilian judoka (born 1974)

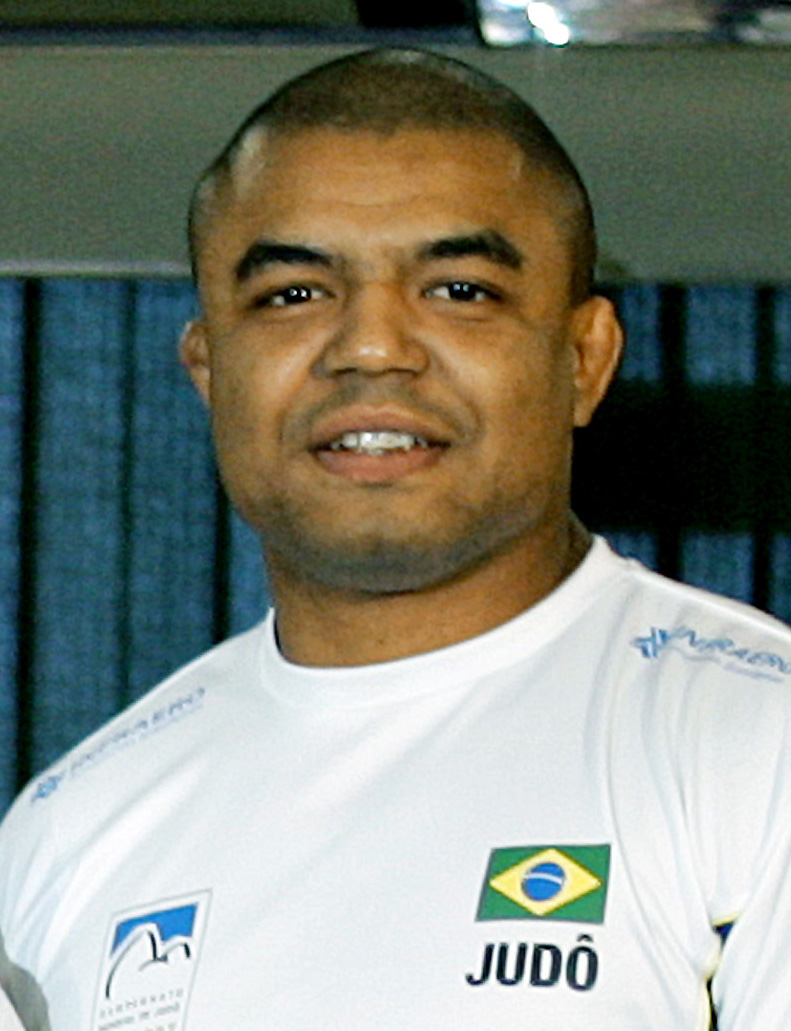
- Honorato in 2005

Personal information
- Born: 9 November 1974 (age 51) São Paulo, Brazil
- Occupation: Judoka

Sport
- Country: Brazil
- Sport: Judo
- Weight class: –90 kg

Achievements and titles
- Olympic Games: (silver) (2000)
- World Champ.: (bronze) (2003)
- Pan American Champ.: (1994, 2003, 2004, 2004, 2006, 2007)
Medal record
Men's judo
Representing Brazil
Olympic Games
Silver medal – second place	2000 Sydney	‍–‍90 kg
World Championships
Bronze medal – third place	2003 Osaka	‍–‍90 kg
Pan American Games
Bronze medal – third place	2003 Santo Domingo	‍–‍90 kg
Pan American Championships
Gold medal – first place	1994 Santiago	‍–‍86 kg
Gold medal – first place	2003 Salvador	‍–‍90 kg
Gold medal – first place	2004 Isla Margarita	Open
Gold medal – first place	2004 Isla Margarita	‍–‍90 kg
Gold medal – first place	2006 Buenos Aires	Open
Gold medal – first place	2007 Montreal	Open
World Juniors Championships
Bronze medal – third place	1994 Cairo	‍–‍86 kg

Profile at external databases
- IJF: 5324
- JudoInside.com: 696
- Updated on 31 May 2023

Carlos Eduardo Honorato (born 9 November 1974 in São Paulo) is a judoka from Brazil, who won the silver medal in the middleweight (‍–‍90 kg) division at the 2000 Summer Olympics in Sydney, Australia. In the final he was defeated by Netherlands's Mark Huizinga.
