= David Margoshvili =

Georgian judoka (born 1980)

Personal information
- Born: 11 August 1980 (age 46)
- Occupation: Judoka

Sport
- Sport: Judo
Medal record
Men's judo
Representing Georgia
European Championships
Silver medal – second place	2001 Paris	66 kg
Silver medal – second place	2003 Düsseldorf	66 kg

Profile at external databases
- JudoInside.com: 6712

David Margoshvili (Georgian: დავით მარგოშვილი; born August 11, 1980) is a Georgian judoka.

He finished in joint fifth place in the half-lightweight (66 kg) division at the 2004 Summer Olympics, having lost the bronze medal match to Yordanis Arencibia of Cuba.

== Achievements ==
Year	Tournament	Place	Weight class
2005	European Judo Championships	5th	Half lightweight (66 kg)
2005	European Judo Championships	5th	Half lightweight (66 kg)
2004	Olympic Games	5th	Half lightweight (66 kg)
2003	European Judo Championships	2nd	Half lightweight (66 kg)
2001	European Judo Championships	2nd	Half lightweight (66 kg)
