= 2003 World Judo Championships =

Judo competition

Judo 2003 World Judo Championships
- Venue: Osaka-jō Hall
- Location: Osaka, Japan
- Dates: 11–14 September 2003
- Competitors: 631 from 100 nations

Champions
- Men's team: France
- Women's team: Japan

Competition at external databases
- Links: IJF • JudoInside

The 2003 World Judo Championships were the 23rd edition of the World Judo Championships, and were held in Osaka, Japan from 11–15 September 2003. On the last day of competition, team events were held, as France won the men's team event and Japan won the women's.

== Medal overview ==
=== Men ===
Event	Gold	Silver	Bronze
Extra-lightweight (60 kg)	Choi Min-Ho (KOR)	Craig Fallon (GBR)	Tadahiro Nomura (JPN)
Extra-lightweight (60 kg)	Choi Min-Ho (KOR)	Craig Fallon (GBR)	Anis Lounifi (TUN)
Half-lightweight (66 kg)	Arash Miresmaeili (IRI)	Larbi Benboudaoud (FRA)	Yordanis Arencibia (CUB)
Half-lightweight (66 kg)	Arash Miresmaeili (IRI)	Larbi Benboudaoud (FRA)	Magomed Dzhafarov (RUS)
Lightweight (73 kg)	Lee Won-Hee (KOR)	Daniel Fernandes (FRA)	João Neto (POR)
Lightweight (73 kg)	Lee Won-Hee (KOR)	Daniel Fernandes (FRA)	Vitaliy Makarov (RUS)
Half-middleweight (81 kg)	Florian Wanner (GER)	Sergei Aschwanden (SUI)	Robert Krawczyk (POL)
Half-middleweight (81 kg)	Florian Wanner (GER)	Sergei Aschwanden (SUI)	Aleksei Budõlin (EST)
Half-middleweight (90 kg)	Hwang Hee-Tae (KOR)	Zurab Zviadauri (GEO)	Siarhei Kukharenka (BLR)
Half-middleweight (90 kg)	Hwang Hee-Tae (KOR)	Zurab Zviadauri (GEO)	Carlos Honorato (BRA)
Half-heavyweight (100 kg)	Kosei Inoue (JPN)	Ghislain Lemaire (FRA)	Ihar Makarau (BLR)
Half-heavyweight (100 kg)	Kosei Inoue (JPN)	Ghislain Lemaire (FRA)	Mário Sabino (BRA)
Heavyweight (+100 kg)	Yasuyuki Muneta (JPN)	Dennis van der Geest (NED)	Tamerlan Tmenov (RUS)
Heavyweight (+100 kg)	Yasuyuki Muneta (JPN)	Dennis van der Geest (NED)	Yevgen Sotnikov (UKR)
Openweight	Keiji Suzuki (JPN)	Indrek Pertelson (EST)	Abdullo Tangriev (UZB)
Openweight	Keiji Suzuki (JPN)	Indrek Pertelson (EST)	Movlud Miraliyev (AZE)
Men's team	France (FRA)	Japan (JPN)	Iran (IRI)
Men's team	France (FRA)	Japan (JPN)	Russia (RUS)

=== Women ===
Event	Gold	Silver	Bronze
Extra-lightweight (48 kg)	Ryoko Tamura (JPN)	Frédérique Jossinet (FRA)	Neşe Şensoy (TUR)
Extra-lightweight (48 kg)	Ryoko Tamura (JPN)	Frédérique Jossinet (FRA)	Danieska Carrión (CUB)
Half-lightweight (52 kg)	Amarilis Savón (CUB)	Annabelle Euranie (FRA)	Raffaella Imbriani (GER)
Half-lightweight (52 kg)	Amarilis Savón (CUB)	Annabelle Euranie (FRA)	Yuki Yokosawa (JPN)
Lightweight (57 kg)	Kye Sun-hui (PRK)	Yvonne Bönisch (GER)	Yurisleidis Lupetey (CUB)
Lightweight (57 kg)	Kye Sun-hui (PRK)	Yvonne Bönisch (GER)	Deborah Gravenstijn (NED)
Half-middleweight (63 kg)	Daniela Krukower (ARG)	Driulis González (CUB)	Anna von Harnier (GER)
Half-middleweight (63 kg)	Daniela Krukower (ARG)	Driulis González (CUB)	Ylenia Scapin (ITA)
Middleweight (70 kg)	Masae Ueno (JPN)	Regla Leyén (CUB)	Edith Bosch (NED)
Middleweight (70 kg)	Masae Ueno (JPN)	Regla Leyén (CUB)	Annett Böhm (GER)
Half-heavyweight (78 kg)	Noriko Anno (JPN)	Yurisel Laborde (CUB)	Edinanci Silva (BRA)
Half-heavyweight (78 kg)	Noriko Anno (JPN)	Yurisel Laborde (CUB)	Esther San Miguel (ESP)
Heavyweight (+78 kg)	Sun Fuming (CHN)	Maki Tsukada (JPN)	Tea Donguzashvili (RUS)
Heavyweight (+78 kg)	Sun Fuming (CHN)	Maki Tsukada (JPN)	Karina Bryant (GBR)
Openweight	Tong Wen (CHN)	Karina Bryant (GBR)	Mara Kovačević (SCG)
Openweight	Tong Wen (CHN)	Karina Bryant (GBR)	Daima Beltrán (CUB)
Women's team	Japan (JPN)	China (CHN)	France (FRA) (25x17px)
Women's team	Japan (JPN)	China (CHN)	Cuba (CUB) (25x17px)

=== Medal table ===
* Host nation (Japan)

Rank	Nation	Gold	Silver	Bronze	Total
1	Japan (JPN)*	6	1	2	9
2	South Korea (KOR)	3	0	0	3
3	China (CHN)	2	0	0	2
4	Cuba (CUB)	1	3	4	8
5	Germany (GER)	1	1	3	5
6	Argentina (ARG)	1	0	0	1
6	Iran (IRN)	1	0	0	1
6	North Korea (PRK)	1	0	0	1
9	France (FRA)	0	5	0	5
10	Great Britain (GBR)	0	2	1	3
11	Netherlands (NED)	0	1	2	3
12	Estonia (EST)	0	1	1	2
13	Georgia (GEO)	0	1	0	1
13	Switzerland (SUI)	0	1	0	1
15	Russia (RUS)	0	0	4	4
16	Brazil (BRA)	0	0	3	3
17	Belarus (BLR)	0	0	2	2
18	Azerbaijan (AZE)	0	0	1	1
18	Italy (ITA)	0	0	1	1
18	Poland (POL)	0	0	1	1
18	Portugal (POR)	0	0	1	1
18	Serbia and Montenegro (SCG)	0	0	1	1
18	Spain (ESP)	0	0	1	1
18	Tunisia (TUN)	0	0	1	1
18	Turkey (TUR)	0	0	1	1
18	Ukraine (UKR)	0	0	1	1
18	Uzbekistan (UZB)	0	0	1	1
Totals (27 entries)		16	16	32	64

== Results overview ==
=== Men ===
==== 60 kg ====
14 September – Final

Position	Judoka
1.	Choi Min-Ho (KOR)
2.	Craig Fallon (GBR)
3.	Tadahiro Nomura (JPN)
3.	Anis Lounifi (TUN)
5.	Oliver Gussenberg (GER)
5.	Pak Nam-Choi (PRK)
7.	Elchin Ismaylov (AZE)
7.	Masoud Haji Akhondzadeh (IRI)

==== 66 kg ====
13 September – Final

Position	Judoka
1.	Arash Miresmaeili (IRI)
2.	Larbi Benboudaoud (FRA)
3.	Yordanis Arencibia (CUB)
3.	Magomed Dzhafarov (RUS)
5.	João Pina (POR)
5.	Miloš Mijalković (SCG)
7.	Hüseyin Özkan (TUR)
7.	Tomoo Torii (JPN)

==== 73 kg ====
13 September – Final

Position	Judoka
1.	Lee Won-Hee (KOR)
2.	Daniel Fernandes (FRA)
3.	João Neto (POR)
3.	Vitaliy Makarov (RUS)
5.	Victor Bivol (MDA)
5.	Egamnazar Akbarov (UZB)
7.	Yoel Razvozov (ISR)
7.	Yusuke Kanamaru (JPN)

==== 81 kg ====
12 September – Final

Position	Judoka
1.	Florian Wanner (GER)
2.	Sergei Aschwanden (SUI)
3.	Robert Krawczyk (POL)
3.	Aleksei Budõlin (EST)
5.	Yoshihiro Akiyama (JPN)
5.	Ricardo Echarte (ESP)
7.	Ariel Sganga (ARG)
7.	Cédric Claverie (FRA)

==== 90 kg ====
12 September – Final

Position	Judoka
1.	Hwang Hee-Tae (KOR)
2.	Zurab Zviadauri (GEO)
3.	Siarhei Kukharenka (BLR)
3.	Carlos Honorato (BRA)
5.	Yosvany Despaigne (CUB)
5.	Keith Morgan (CAN)
7.	Gabriel Lama (CHI)
7.	Francesco Lepre (ITA)

==== 100 kg ====
11 September – Final

Position	Judoka
1.	Kosei Inoue (JPN)
2.	Ghislain Lemaire (FRA)
3.	Ihar Makarau (BLR)
3.	Mário Sabino (BRA)
5.	Michele Monti (ITA)
5.	Nicolas Gill (CAN)
7.	Iveri Jikurauli (GEO)
7.	Michael Jurack (GER)

==== +100 kg ====
11 September – Final

Position	Judoka
1.	Yasuyuki Muneta (JPN)
2.	Dennis van der Geest (NED)
3.	Tamerlan Tmenov (RUS)
3.	Yevgen Sotnikov (UKR)
5.	Daniel Hernandes (BRA)
5.	Frank Möller (GER)
7.	Janusz Wojnarowicz (POL)
7.	Selim Tataroğlu (TUR)

==== Open class ====
14 September – Final

Position	Judoka
1.	Keiji Suzuki (JPN)
2.	Indrek Pertelson (EST)
3.	Abdullo Tangriev (UZB)
3.	Movlud Miraliyev (AZE)
5.	Amel Mekić (BIH)
5.	Gabriel Munteanu (ROM)
7.	Janusz Wojnarowicz (POL)
7.	Daniel Hernandes (BRA)

==== Men's team ====
15 September – Final

Position	Country
1.	France (FRA)
2.	Japan (JPN)
3.	Iran (IRI)
3.	Russia (RUS)
5.	Cuba (CUB)
5.	South Korea (KOR)
7.	Australia (AUS)
7.	Tunisia (TUN)

=== Women ===
==== 48 kg ====
14 September – Final

Position	Judoka
1.	Ryoko Tamura (JPN)
2.	Frédérique Jossinet (FRA)
3.	Neşe Şensoy (TUR)
3.	Danieska Carrión (CUB)
5.	Julia Matijass (GER)
5.	Gao Feng (CHN)
7.	Alina Dumitru (ROM)
7.	Anna Żemła (POL)

==== 52 kg ====
13 September – Final

Position	Judoka
1.	Amarilis Savón (CUB)
2.	Annabelle Euranie (FRA)
3.	Raffaella Imbriani (GER)
3.	Yuki Yokosawa (JPN)
5.	Ri Sang-Rim (PRK)
5.	Georgina Singleton (GBR)
7.	Ana Carrascosa (ESP)
7.	Michal Feinblat (ISR)

==== 57 kg ====
13 September – Final

Position	Judoka
1.	Kye Sun-hui (PRK)
2.	Yvonne Bönisch (GER)
3.	Yurisleidis Lupetey (CUB)
3.	Deborah Gravenstijn (NED)
5.	Maria Pekli (AUS)
5.	Barbara Harel (FRA)
7.	Isabel Fernández (ESP)
7.	Xu Yan (CHN)

==== 63 kg ====
12 September – Final

Position	Judoka
1.	Daniela Krukower (ARG)
2.	Driulis González (CUB)
3.	Anna von Harnier (GER)
3.	Ylenia Scapin (ITA)
5.	Lee Bok-Hee (KOR)
5.	Vânia Yukie Ishii (BRA)
7.	Lucie Décosse (FRA)
7.	Gella Vandecaveye (BEL)

==== 70 kg ====
12 September – Final

Position	Judoka
1.	Masae Ueno (JPN)
2.	Regla Leyén (CUB)
3.	Edith Bosch (NED)
3.	Annett Böhm (GER)
5.	Qin Dongya (CHN)
5.	Kate Howey (GBR)
7.	Kim Ryon-Mi (PRK)
7.	Cecilia Blanco (ESP)

==== 78 kg ====
11 September – Final

Position	Judoka
1.	Noriko Anno (JPN)
2.	Yurisel Laborde (CUB)
3.	Edinanci Silva (BRA)
3.	Esther San Miguel (ESP)
5.	Claudia Zwiers (NED)
5.	Céline Lebrun (FRA)
7.	Dorjgotovyn Tserenkhand (MGL)
7.	Uta Kühnen (GER)

==== +78 kg ====
11 September – Final

Position	Judoka
1.	Sun Fuming (CHN)
2.	Maki Tsukada (JPN)
3.	Tea Donguzashvili (RUS)
3.	Karina Bryant (GBR)
5.	Sandra Köppen (GER)
5.	Daima Beltrán (CUB)
7.	Barbara Andolina (ITA)
7.	Françoise Harteveld (NED)

==== Open class ====
14 September – Final

Position	Judoka
1.	Tong Wen (CHN)
2.	Karina Bryant (GBR)
3.	Mara Kovačević (SCG)
3.	Daima Beltrán (CUB)
5.	Magdalena Kozioł (POL)
5.	Céline Lebrun (FRA)
7.	Claudia Zwiers (NED)
7.	Giovanna Blanco (VEN)
