= Arash Miresmaeili =

Iranian judoka (born 1981)

Personal information
- Nationality: Iranian
- Born: 3 March 1981 (age 45) Khorramabad, Iran
- Occupation: Judoka

Sport
- Sport: Judo
- Weight class: –66 kg

Achievements and titles
- Olympic Games: 5th (2000)
- World Champ.: (gold) (2001, 2003)
- Asian Champ.: (gold) (1999, 2001, 2008)
Medal record
Men's judo
Representing Iran
World Championships
Gold medal – first place	2001 Munich	66 kg
Gold medal – first place	2003 Osaka	66 kg
Bronze medal – third place	2005 Cairo	66 kg
Bronze medal – third place	2007 Rio de Janeiro	66 kg
Asian Games
Silver medal – second place	2006 Doha	66 kg
Bronze medal – third place	1998 Bangkok	66 kg
Asian Championships
Gold medal – first place	1999 Wenzhou	66 kg
Gold medal – first place	2001 Ulaanbaatar	66 kg
Gold medal – first place	2008 Jeju	66 kg
Silver medal – second place	2005 Tashkent	66 kg
Bronze medal – third place	2007 Kuwait City	66 kg
World Juniors Championships
Silver medal – second place	2000 Nabeul	66 kg

Profile at external databases
- IJF: 2897
- JudoInside.com: 1826
- Updated on 28 April 2022

Arash Miresmaeili (Persian: آرش میراسماعیلی, born 3 March 1981) is an Iranian judoka and the President of Islamic Republic of Iran Judo Federation since March 2019.

== World Judo Championships ==
He won the gold medal in two World Judo Championships, the first one in 2001 in Munich, Germany, and the second in 2003 in Osaka, Japan. He also won bronze medal in the 2005 World Judo Championships in Cairo, Egypt and 2007 World Judo Championships in Rio de Janeiro, Brazil.

== Athens Olympic Games; controversy ==
Arash Miresmaili was the favorite for the gold medal in the 2004 Summer Olympics, where he was the flag bearer for Iran at the opening ceremony.

Slated to fight Israeli judoka competitor Ehud Vaks in the first round, Miresmaili was disqualified from competing because he was above the permissible weight limit for his class. He was more than two kilos - four pounds - over the 66-kilogram weight limit. It was claimed that Miresmaili deliberately set out to be disqualified, rather than compete against an Israeli, which was understood from Miresmaili's comments: "Although I have trained for months and was in good shape I refused to fight my Israeli opponent to sympathize with the suffering of the people of Palestine and I do not feel upset at all."

Judo officials questioned how such an experienced two-time world champion competitor could have made such a basic error.

There was precedent for Miresmaeili's actions in the sport of judo. At the 2001 World Judo Championships, Iranian Mahed Malekmohammdi refused to face Israeli judoka Yoel Razvozov. Similarly, Iranian judoka Masoud Haji Akhoundzade pulled out of a bout against Israeli lightweight Zvi Shafran.

An Iran National Olympic Committee spokesman said it was Iran's "general policy" to avoid competing against Israeli athletes and that Miresmaeili had just followed Iran's protocol. Comments from Iranian officials and politicians supported this understanding. The Iranian state news agency IRNA quoted then-Iranian President Mohammad Khatami as saying that Miresmaeili's actions would be "recorded in the history of Iranian glories" and that the nation considered him to be "the champion of the 2004 Olympic Games." Iranian Olympic team chairman Nassrollah Sajadi told the Shargh newspaper that the government should give the athlete $115,000 for his action, the amount the Iranian government awards gold medal winning athletes. Then-mayor of Tehran and former president Mahmoud Ahmadinejad said that though Miresmaeili "did not get a gold medal, he earned eternal honor by his refusal". Gholam-Ali Haddad-Adel, the speaker of Iran's parliament, congratulated Miresmaeili, calling his refusal to compete a "brave decision," and saying that "Your disqualification because of supporting Palestine would promote your position in the heart of Muslims."

Vaks said, "I don't think they (Iran) have the right not to acknowledge us. Israel is a democracy, and Iran isn't. But sport is linked to politics... Maybe the next Olympics will be better."

On August 18, 2004, the International Judo Federation (IJF), which had set up a commission to investigate whether Miresmaeili deliberately missed weight so he would not have to face Vaks, concluded he had no intention to avoid competing against an Israeli. After a hearing which included the president of Iran's judo federation, the commission concluded that Miresmaeili said he had no pre-planned intentions for not competing and that "he made no statement of any sort to any press," according to an IJF statement. The only issue that remained was that Miresmaeili was overweight on the weigh-in day, the IJF said, and as it has no rule for penalizing overweight athletes, it decided not to take any action against him.

On September 8, 2004, Iran's official press agency announced the government had given Miresmaili $125,000, the same amount awarded to Iran's two Athens gold medalists.

== Denial of entry to the election of Iran's Judo Federation ==
In the summer of 2009, before the controversial Iranian presidential elections, Miresmaeili chose to support the candidacy of Mohsen Rezaee, one of Mahmoud Ahmadinejad's rivals.

Rezaei appointed Miresmaeili as his campaign chief for the Sports Committee. After being appointed, during a press conference, Miresmaeili stated that if Rezaee were elected as president, there would be no more place for Iranian sports officials appointed for political purposes, as opposed to their knowledge and capabilities. His backing of Rezaee and his remarks did not sit well with the conservative backers of Mahmoud Ahmadinejad in the Iranian Sports Federation and elsewhere. They also drew immediate and harsh condemnation from the former Chief of Iran's Sports Federation, Mohammed Aliabadi.

Since then, the effort to punish and sideline Miresmaeili went as far as denying him entry to an election event of Iran's Judo Federation held on Jan 2, 2009. Miresmaeili tried very hard to gain entry into the event, and was denied entry by the security guards. This angered Miresmaeili to the point where he called a press conference that day, during which he stated that he was very sorry for sports in Iran and that he was officially done with the Iranian Judo, but that they could not kill his love for Judo.

== As the President of the Iranian Judo Federation ==
In 2019, Miresmaili was elected President of the Iranian Judo Federation for a four-year term by receiving 32 out of 43 votes.

== See also ==
- Boycotts of Israel in individual sports

Olympic Games
Preceded by Amir Reza Khadem	Flagbearer for Iran; Athens 2004	Succeeded by Homa Hosseini
