= Yordanis Arencibia =

Cuban judoka (born 1980)

Personal information
- Born: 24 January 1980 (age 46)
- Occupation: Judoka

Sport
- Country: Cuba
- Sport: Judo
- Weight class: –66 kg, –73 kg

Achievements and titles
- Olympic Games: (bronze) (2004, 2008)
- World Champ.: (silver) (2007)
- Pan American Champ.: (2002, 2006, 2007, 2008)
Medal record
Men's judo
Representing Cuba
Olympic Games
Bronze medal – third place	2004 Athens	‍–‍66 kg
Bronze medal – third place	2008 Beijing	‍–‍66 kg
World Championships
Silver medal – second place	2007 Rio de Janeiro	‍–‍66 kg
Bronze medal – third place	1999 Birmingham	‍–‍66 kg
Bronze medal – third place	2001 Munich	‍–‍66 kg
Bronze medal – third place	2003 Osaka	‍–‍66 kg
Pan American Games
Gold medal – first place	2003 Santo Domingo	‍–‍66 kg
Bronze medal – third place	1999 Winnipeg	‍–‍66 kg
Bronze medal – third place	2007 Rio de Janeiro	‍–‍66 kg
Pan American Championships
Gold medal – first place	2002 Santo Domingo	‍–‍66 kg
Gold medal – first place	2006 Buenos Aires	‍–‍66 kg
Gold medal – first place	2007 Montreal	‍–‍66 kg
Gold medal – first place	2008 Miami	‍–‍66 kg
Silver medal – second place	1998 Santo Domingo	‍–‍60 kg
Silver medal – second place	2001 Cordoba	‍–‍66 kg
Silver medal – second place	2004 Isla Margarita	‍–‍66 kg
Bronze medal – third place	2009 Buenos Aires	‍–‍73 kg
IJF Grand Slam
Silver medal – second place	2009 Paris	‍–‍73 kg
World Juniors Championships
Gold medal – first place	1998 Cali	‍–‍60 kg
Summer Universiade
Silver medal – second place	2003 Jeju	‍–‍66 kg
Central American and Caribbean Games
Gold medal – first place	2006 Cartagena	‍–‍66 kg
Gold medal – first place	2006 Cartagena	Men's team

Profile at external databases
- IJF: 6402
- JudoInside.com: 952
- Updated on 28 May 2023

Yordanis Arencibia Verdecia (born 24 January 1980 in Amancio Rodríguez, Cuba) is a Cuban judoka.

At the 2004 Summer Olympics he won the bronze medal in the men's half-lightweight (‍–‍66 kg) category, together with Georgi Georgiev of Bulgaria. He also won the bronze medal at the 2008 Summer Olympics with Pak Chol-Min of North Korea.

He has also won bronze medals at the 1999, 2001 and 2003 World Judo Championships.
