= Masato Uchishiba =

Japanese judoka (born 1978)

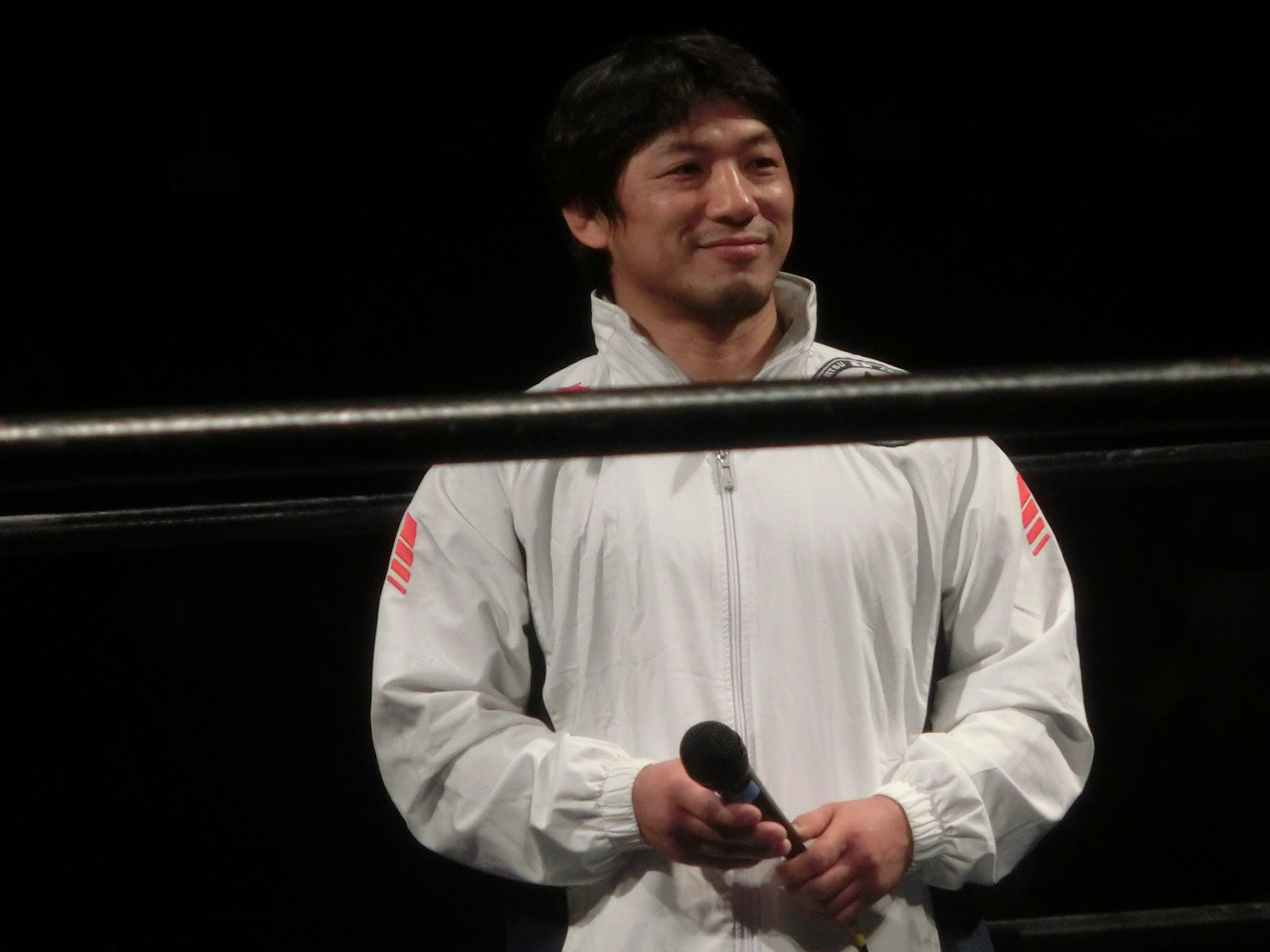
- Uchishiba in 2017

Personal information
- Born: 17 June 1978 (age 48) Kōshi, Kumamoto, Japan
- Occupation: Judoka

Sport
- Sport: Judo
- Weight class: –60 kg, –66 kg

Achievements and titles
- Olympic Games: (gold) (2004, 2008)
- World Champ.: (silver) (2005)
- Asian Champ.: (bronze) (2002)
Medal record
Men's judo
Representing Japan
Olympic Games
Gold medal – first place	2004 Athens	‍–‍66 kg
Gold medal – first place	2008 Beijing	‍–‍66 kg
World Championships
Silver medal – second place	2005 Cairo	‍–‍66 kg
Asian Games
Bronze medal – third place	2002 Busan	‍–‍60 kg
IJF Grand Slam
Gold medal – first place	2009 Paris	‍–‍66 kg
Summer Universiade
Gold medal – first place	2001 Beijing	‍–‍60 kg

Profile at external databases
- IJF: 85
- JudoInside.com: 1060
- Updated on 28 May 2023

Masato Uchishiba (内柴 正人, Uchishiba Masato; born 17 June 1978) is a Japanese judoka who won the gold medal in the men's under 66 kg division at the 2004 Summer Olympics in Athens, Greece, and at the 2008 Summer Olympics in Beijing, China.

== Biography ==
To win the Olympic gold at Athens, he defeated Jozef Krnáč of Slovakia in the men's 66 kg final. Of winning the gold, he said, "I wanted this so badly I wouldn't have cared if it was my last fight ever," though his comments were officially translated as: "It is probably my last Olympics, that is why I am proud of my medal." At the 2005 Judo World Championships, he won silver in his division. He also won the gold medal at the 2008 Summer Olympics against Benjamin Darbelet of France.

Starting in April 2010, Uchishiba coached the women's judo team at Kyushu University of Nursing and Social Welfare in Kumamoto Prefecture. In November 2011, the school released Uchishiba from his coaching position following sexual harassment allegations. On 6 December 2011, he was arrested by the Tokyo Metropolitan Police Department on suspicion of rape in Tokyo in September 2011. Uchishiba said that the act was consensual. On 1 February 2013, Tokyo District Court declined his claim as "impossible to trust", and sentenced him to 5 years in prison.

== Submission grappling career ==
Uchishiba competed in a superfight against Taisei Sakuraba at Quintet 4 on September 10, 2023. He was submitted with a kneebar.

== Honours ==
- ~~Medal with Purple Ribbon (2004, 2008)~~ (In 2011, deprived)
