= Iveri Jikurauli =

Georgian judoka (born 1976)

Personal information
- Born: 22 March 1976 (age 50) Dusheti, Mtskheta-Mtianeti, Georgia

Sport
- Sport: Judo
Medal record
Representing Georgia
European Championships
Silver medal – second place	1995 Birmingham	86 kg
Bronze medal – third place	1994 Gdansk	86 kg
Bronze medal – third place	2000 Wroclaw	100 kg
Bronze medal – third place	2001 Paris	100 kg
Summer Universiade
Bronze medal – third place	1999 Palma de Mallorca	100 kg

Iveri Jikurauli (born March 22, 1976) is a Georgian judoka.

== Achievements ==
Year	Tournament	Place	Weight class
2003	World Judo Championships	7th	Half heavyweight (100 kg)
2003	European Judo Championships	5th	Half heavyweight (100 kg)
2001	World Judo Championships	5th	Half heavyweight (100 kg)
2001	European Judo Championships	3rd	Half heavyweight (100 kg)
2000	Olympic Games	7th	Half heavyweight (100 kg)
2000	European Judo Championships	3rd	Half heavyweight (100 kg)
1999	European Judo Championships	7th	Half heavyweight (100 kg)
1999	Universiade	3rd	Half heavyweight (100 kg)
1997	European Judo Championships	5th	Half heavyweight (95 kg)
1995	European Judo Championships	2nd	Middleweight (86 kg)
1994	European Judo Championships	3rd	Middleweight (86 kg)
