= Judo at the 2004 Summer Olympics – Men's 81 kg =

Judo competition

Men's 81 kg at the Games of the XXVIII Olympiad
- Venue: Ano Liossia Olympic Hall
- Dates: 17 August 2004
- Competitors: 32 from 32 nations
- Winning score: 1110

Medalists
1st place, gold medalist(s)		Ilias Iliadis	Greece
2nd place, silver medalist(s)		Roman Gontyuk	Ukraine
3rd place, bronze medalist(s)		Flávio Canto	Brazil
3rd place, bronze medalist(s)		Dmitri Nossov	Russia

Men's 81 kg competition in judo at the 2004 Summer Olympics was held on August 17 at the Ano Liossia Olympic Hall.

This event was the median of the men's judo weight classes, limiting competitors to a maximum of 81 kilograms of body mass. Like all other judo events, bouts lasted five minutes. If the bout was still tied at the end, it was extended for another five-minute, sudden-death period; if neither judoka scored during that period, the match is decided by the judges. The tournament bracket consisted of a single-elimination contest culminating in a gold medal match. There was also a repechage to determine the winners of the two bronze medals. Each judoka who had lost to a semifinalist competed in the repechage. The two judokas who lost in the semifinals faced the winner of the opposite half of the bracket's repechage in bronze medal bouts.

Future Russian politician Dmitry Nossov won a bronze medal.

== Schedule ==
All times are Greece Standard Time (UTC+2)

Date	Time	Round
Tuesday, 17 August 2004	10:30; 13:00; 17:00	Preliminaries; Repechage; Final

== Qualifying athletes ==
Mat	Athlete	Country
1	Robert Krawczyk	Poland
1	Mohamed Ben Saleh	Libya
1	Rick Hawn	United States
1	Erkin Ibragimov	Kyrgyzstan
1	Guillaume Elmont	Netherlands
1	Mehman Azizov	Azerbaijan
1	Siarhei Shundzikau	Belarus
1	Ramziddin Sayidov	Uzbekistan
1	Reza Chahkhandagh	Iran
1	Ricardo Echarte	Spain
1	Adil Belgaid	Morocco
1	Roman Gontyuk	Ukraine
1	Florian Wanner	Germany
1	José Miguel Boissard	Dominican Republic
1	Amar Benikhlef	Algeria
1	Aboumedan El Sayed	Egypt
2	Gabriel Arteaga	Cuba
2	Damdinsürengiin Nyamkhüü	Mongolia
2	kwon Young-woo	South Korea
2	Cédric Claverie	France
2	Morgan Endicott-Davies	Australia
2	Ilias Iliadis	Greece
2	Sergei Aschwanden	Switzerland
2	Ariel Sganga	Argentina
2	Masahiko Tomouchi	Japan
2	Dmitri Nossov	Russia
2	Roberto Meloni	Italy
2	Nuno Delgado	Portugal
2	Flávio Canto	Brazil
2	Mario Valles	Colombia
2	Aleksei Budõlin	Estonia
2	Grigol Mamrikishvili	Georgia

== Tournament results ==
=== Final ===
Final
1	Roman Gontyuk (UKR)	0000
2	Ilias Iliadis (GRE)	1110

=== Mat 1 ===
Round of 32
Robert Krawczyk (POL)	1101
Mohamed Ben Saleh (LBA)	0000
Rick Hawn (USA)	0010
Erkin Ibragimov (KGZ)	0001
Guillaume Elmont (NED)	0001
Mehman Azizov (AZE)	1010
Siarhei Shundzikau (BLR)	1111
Ramziddin Sayidov (UZB)	0011
Reza Chahkhandagh (IRI)	1000
Ricardo Echarte (ESP)	0000
Adil Belgaid (MAR)	0000
Roman Gontyuk (UKR)	1020
Florian Wanner (GER)	1001
José Miguel Boissard (DOM)	0000
Amar Benikhlef (ALG)	1020
Aboumedan El Sayed (EGY)	0000

Round of 16
Robert Krawczyk (POL)	1000
Rick Hawn (USA)	0000
Mehman Azizov (AZE)	0010
Siarhei Shundzikau (BLR)	0001
Reza Chahkhandagh (IRI)	0000
Roman Gontyuk (UKR)	1020
Florian Wanner (GER)	1002
Amar Benikhlef (ALG)	0000

Quarterfinals
Robert Krawczyk (POL)	1001
Mehman Azizov (AZE)	0000
Roman Gontyuk (UKR)	1020
Florian Wanner (GER)	0000

Semifinals
Robert Krawczyk (POL)	0013
Roman Gontyuk (UKR)	1011

=== Mat 2 ===
Round of 32
Gabriel Arteaga (CUB)	0130
Damdinsürengiin Nyamkhüü (MGL)	0001
Kwon Young-woo (KOR)	0111
Cédric Claverie (FRA)	0001
Morgan Endicott-Davies (AUS)	0000
Ilias Iliadis (GRE)	1002
Sergei Aschwanden (SUI)	0002
Ariel Sganga (ARG)	1000
Masahiko Tomouchi (JPN)	0001
Dmitri Nossov (RUS)	0201
Roberto Meloni (ITA)	0010
Nuno Delgado (POR)	0002
Flávio Canto (BRA)	1000
Mario Valles (COL)	0000
Aleksei Budõlin (EST)	0110
Grigol Mamrikishvili (GEO)	0100

Round of 16
Gabriel Arteaga (CUB)	0001
Kwon Young-woo (KOR)	0010
Ilias Iliadis (GRE)	WO
Ariel Sganga (ARG)
Dmitri Nossov (RUS)	0011
Roberto Meloni (ITA)	0001
Flávio Canto (BRA)	0011
Aleksei Budõlin (EST)	0010

Quarterfinals
Kwon Young-woo (KOR)	0000
Ilias Iliadis (GRE)	0001
Dmitri Nossov (RUS)	0110
Flávio Canto (BRA)	0010

Semifinals
Ilias Iliadis (GRE)	1010
Dmitri Nossov (RUS)	0000

=== Repechage ===
Those judoka eliminated in earlier rounds by the four semifinalists of the main bracket advanced to the repechage. These matches determined the two bronze medalists for the event.

First round
Mohamed Ben Saleh (LBA)	0000
Rick Hawn (USA)	1001
Adil Belgaid (MAR)	0013
Reza Chahkhandagh (IRI)	0001
Morgan Endicott-Davies (AUS)	1000
Ariel Sganga (ARG)	0000
Masahiko Tomouchi (JPN)	0001
Roberto Meloni (ITA)	0102

Second round
Mehman Azizov (AZE)	1000
Rick Hawn (USA)	0000
Florian Wanner (GER)	0201
Adil Belgaid (MAR)
Kwon Young-woo (KOR)	1001
Morgan Endicott-Davies (AUS)	0000
Flávio Canto (BRA)	0200
Roberto Meloni (ITA)	0001

Third round
Mehman Azizov (AZE)	1000
Florian Wanner (GER)	0000
Kwon Young-woo (KOR)	0000
Flávio Canto (BRA)	1000

Bronze medal finals
Dmitri Nossov (RUS)	0100
Mehman Azizov (AZE)	0020
Robert Krawczyk (POL)	0011
Flávio Canto (BRA)	0110
