= Judo at the 2000 Summer Olympics – Men's 81 kg =

Judo competition

Men's 81 kg at the Games of the XXVII Olympiad
- Venue: Sydney Convention and Exhibition Centre
- Date: 19 September 2000
- Competitors: 37 from 37 nations

Medalists
1st place, gold medalist(s)		Makoto Takimoto	Japan
2nd place, silver medalist(s)		Cho In-chul	South Korea
3rd place, bronze medalist(s)		Nuno Delgado	Portugal
3rd place, bronze medalist(s)		Aleksei Budõlin	Estonia

Men's 81 kg competition in judo at the 2000 Summer Olympics was held on 19 September at the Sydney Convention and Exhibition Centre.

This event was the median of the men's judo weight classes, limiting competitors to a maximum of 81 kilograms of body mass. Like all other judo events, bouts lasted five minutes. If the bout was still tied at the end, it was extended for another five-minute, sudden-death period; if neither judoka scored during that period, the match is decided by the judges. The tournament bracket consisted of a single-elimination contest culminating in a gold medal match. There was also a repechage to determine the winners of the two bronze medals. Each judoka who had lost to a semifinalist competed in the repechage. The two judokas who lost in the semifinals faced the winner of the opposite half of the bracket's repechage in bronze medal bouts.

== Schedule ==
All times are Australian Eastern Daylight Time (UTC+11:00)

Date	Time	Round
Tuesday, 19 September 2000	15:00; 20:30	Preliminaries & Repechage; Final

== Tournament results ==
=== Final ===
Final
1	Makoto Takimoto (JPN)	0021
2	Cho In-chul (KOR)	0001

=== Mat 1 ===
First round matches

	Score	
Dario García (ARG)	1000–0000	Mehman Azizov (AZE)
Salifou Koucka Ouiminga (BUR)	0001–1100	Tsend-Ayuushiin Ochirbat (MGL)
Gabriel Arteaga (CUB)	1000–0000	Robert Krawczyk (POL)

Elimination rounds

Round of 32
Makoto Takimoto (JPN)	0210
Ruslan Seilkhanov (KAZ)	0010
Ricardo Echarte (ESP)	0001
Dario García (ARG)	0002
Farkhod Turayev (UZB)	0000
Alvaro Paseyro (URU)	1010
Adil Belgaïd (MAR)	0000
Tsend-Ayuushiin Ochirbat (MGL)	0010
Siarhei Kukharenka (BLR)	1000
Chen Chun-ching (TPE)	0000
Kwak Ok-chol (PRK)	0211
Hermágoras Manglés (VEN)	0010
Marcel Aragão (BRA)	0000
Gabriel Arteaga (CUB)	0010
Maarten Arens (NED)	0001
Djamel Bouras (FRA)	1001

Round of 16
Makoto Takimoto (JPN)	1000
Dario García (ARG)	0000
Alvaro Paseyro (URU)	1001
Tsend-Ayuushiin Ochirbat (MGL)	0000
Siarhei Kukharenka (BLR)	0010
Kwak Ok-chol (PRK)	0010
Gabriel Arteaga (CUB)	0001
Djamel Bouras (FRA)	1001

Quarterfinals
Makoto Takimoto (JPN)	0001
Alvaro Paseyro (URU)	0001
Kwak Ok-chol (PRK)	0001
Djamel Bouras (FRA)	1000

Semifinals
Makoto Takimoto (JPN)	0100
Djamel Bouras (FRA)	0001

=== Mat 2 ===
First round matches

	Score	
Timothy Slyfield (NZL)	1000–0020	Majemite Omagbaluwaje (NGR)
Thierry Vatrican (MON)	0000–1000	Nuno Delgado (POR)

Elimination rounds

Round of 32
Aleksei Budõlin (EST)	1001
Sergei Aschwanden (SUI)	0001
Timothy Slyfield (NZL)	0010
Krisztián Tölgyesi (HUN)	0011
Cho In-chul (KOR)	1110
José Figueroa (PUR)	0001
Patrick Reiter (AUT)	0001
Florian Wanner (GER)	0010
Francesco Lepre (ITA)	0001
Nuno Delgado (POR)	0001
Jason Morris (USA)	0000
Daniel Kelly (AUS)	0001
Kazem Sarikhani (IRI)	1001
Brahima Guindo (MLI)	0011
Graeme Randall (GBR)	1000
Abdessalem Arous (TUN)	0000

Round of 16
Aleksei Budõlin (EST)	0112
Krisztián Tölgyesi (HUN)	0100
Cho In-chul (KOR)	1001
Florian Wanner (GER)	0000
Nuno Delgado (POR)	1010
Daniel Kelly (AUS)	0001
Kazem Sarikhani (IRI)	0200
Graeme Randall (GBR)	0013

Quarterfinals
Aleksei Budõlin (EST)	0020
Cho In-chul (KOR)	0100
Nuno Delgado (POR)	1012
Kazem Sarikhani (IRI)	0001

Semifinals
Cho In-chul (KOR)	0110
Nuno Delgado (POR)	0100

=== Repechage ===
The losing semifinalists as well as those judoka eliminated in earlier rounds by the four semifinalists of the main bracket advanced to the repechage. These matches determined the two bronze medalists for the event.

First round matches

Since 23 judoka qualified for the repechage, one match was held to reduce the field to 22.

	Score	
Thierry Vatrican (MON)	0010–1102	Francesco Lepre (ITA)

Elimination rounds

First round
Ruslan Seilkhanov (KAZ)	1001
Dario García (ARG)	0111
Maarten Arens (NED)	0001
Gabriel Arteaga (CUB)	0000
José Figueroa (PUR)	0000
Florian Wanner (GER)	1001
Francesco Lepre (ITA)	0010
Daniel Kelly (AUS)	0010

Second round
Ruslan Seilkhanov (KAZ)	0001
Alvaro Paseyro (URU)	1001
Maarten Arens (NED)	0010
Kwak Ok-chol (PRK)	1100
Florian Wanner (GER)	0001
Aleksei Budõlin (EST)	1001
Daniel Kelly (AUS)	0101
Kazem Sarikhani (IRI)	1100

Third round
Alvaro Paseyro (URU)	1000
Kwak Ok-chol (PRK)	0001
Aleksei Budõlin (EST)	1000
Kazem Sarikhani (IRI)	0000

Bronze medal finals
Alvaro Paseyro (URU)	0000
Nuno Delgado (POR)	1011
Aleksei Budõlin (EST)	0013
Djamel Bouras (FRA)	0010
