= Judo at the 2008 Summer Olympics – Men's 81 kg =

Men's 81 kg at the Games of the XXIX Olympiad
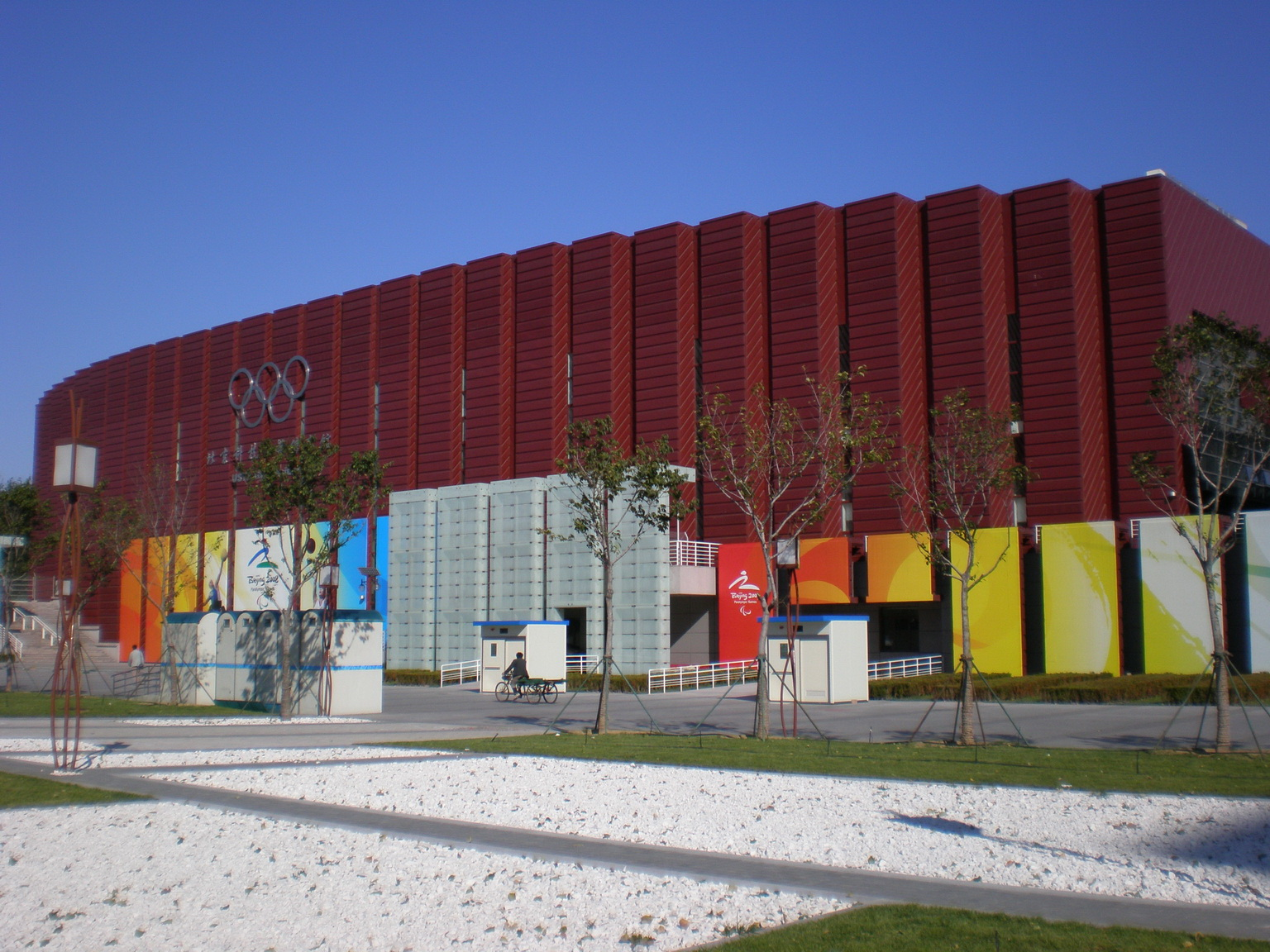
- Beijing Science and Technology University Gymnasium Gymnasium
- Venue: Beijing Science and Technology University Gymnasium
- Dates: 12 August 2008
- Winning score: 0010

Medalists
1st place, gold medalist(s)		Ole Bischof	Germany
2nd place, silver medalist(s)		Kim Jae-Bum	South Korea
3rd place, bronze medalist(s)		Tiago Camilo	Brazil
3rd place, bronze medalist(s)		Roman Gontiuk	Ukraine

The Men's 81 kg Judo competition at the 2008 Summer Olympics was held on August 12 at the Beijing Science and Technology University Gymnasium. Preliminary rounds started at 12:00 Noon CST. Repechage finals, semifinals, bouts for bronze medals and the final were held at 18:00pm CST.

This event was the median of the men's judo weight classes, limiting competitors to a maximum of 81 kilograms of body mass. Like all other judo events, bouts lasted five minutes. If the bout was still tied at the end, it was extended for another five-minute, sudden-death period; if neither judoka scored during that period, the match is decided by the judges. The tournament bracket consisted of a single-elimination contest culminating in a gold medal match. There was also a repechage to determine the winners of the two bronze medals. Each judoka who had lost to a semifinalist competed in the repechage. The two judokas who lost in the semifinals faced the winner of the opposite half of the bracket's repechage in bronze medal bouts.

== Qualifying athletes ==
Mat	Athlete	Country
1	Tiago Camilo	Brazil
1	Takashi Ono	Japan
1	Hamed Malekmohammadi	Iran
1	Aljaz Sedej	Slovenia
1	Franklin Cisneros	El Salvador
1	Travis Stevens	United States
1	Ole Bischof	Germany
1	Mehman Azizov	Azerbaijan
1	Alibek Bashkaev	Russia
1	Safouane Attaf	Morocco
1	Euan Burton	Great Britain
1	Emmanuel Lucenti	Argentina
1	Roman Gontiuk	Ukraine
1	Kouami Sacha Denanyoh	Togo
1	Sherali Bozorov	Tajikistan
1	Mario Valles	Colombia
1	Mark Anthony	Australia
2	Anthony Rodriguez	France
2	Oscar Cardenas	Cuba
2	Edmond Topalli	Albania
2	Saba Gavashelishvili	Georgia
2	João Neto	Portugal
2	Matthew Jago	South Africa
2	Robert Krawczyk	Poland
2	Kim Jae-bum	South Korea
2	Serguei Shundikov	Belarus
2	Youssef Badra	Tunisia
2	Srđan Mrvaljević	Montenegro
2	José Mba Nchama	Equatorial Guinea
2	Guo Lei	China
2	Fiderd Vis	Aruba
2	Guillaume Elmont	Netherlands
2	Damdinsürengiin Nyamkhüü	Mongolia
2	Abderramán Brenes	Puerto Rico
2	Giuseppe Maddaloni	Italy

== Tournament results ==
=== Final ===
Final
1	Ole Bischof (GER)	0010
2	Kim Jae-Bum (KOR)	0000

=== Mat 1 ===
Round of 64
Kouami Sacha Denanyoh (TOG)	0011
Sherali Bozorov (TJK)	0010

Round of 32
Tiago Camilo (BRA)	0120
Takashi Ono (JPN)	0000
Hamed Malekmohammadi (IRI)	1000
Aljaz Sedej (SLO)	0000
Franklin Cisneros (ESA)	0000
Travis Stevens (USA)	1011
Ole Bischof (GER)	0020
Mehman Azizov (AZE)	0011
Alibek Bashkaev (RUS)	0001
Safouane Attaf (MAR)	1000
Euan Burton (GBR)	0010
Emmanuel Lucenti (ARG)	0001
Roman Gontiuk (UKR)	1010
Kouami Sacha Denanyoh (TOG)	0001
Mario Valles (COL)	1010
Mark Anthony (AUS)	0000

Round of 16
Tiago Camilo (BRA)	1010
Hamed Malekmohammadi (IRI)	0000
Travis Stevens (USA)	0001
Ole Bischof (GER)	0011
Safouane Attaf (MAR)	0001
Euan Burton (GBR)	0010
Roman Gontiuk (UKR)	0110
Mario Valles (COL)	0001

Quarterfinals
Tiago Camilo (BRA)	0000
Ole Bischof (GER)	0200
Euan Burton (GBR)	0010
Roman Gontiuk (UKR)	0121

Semifinals
Ole Bischof (GER)	0011
Roman Gontiuk (UKR)	0001

=== Mat 2 ===
Round of 64
Saba Gavashelishvili (GEO)	0000
João Neto (POR)	1010
Youssef Badra (TUN)	0010
Srđan Mrvaljević (MNE)	0020

Round of 32
Anthony Rodriguez (FRA)	0001
Oscar Cardenas (CUB)	0110
Edmond Topalli (ALB)	0000
João Neto (POR)	1001
Matthew Jago (RSA)	0000
Robert Krawczyk (POL)	0120
Kim Jae-Bum (KOR)	0011
Serguei Shundikov (BLR)	0000
Srdjan Mrvaljevic (MNE)	1011
José Mba Nchama (GEQ)	0000
Guo Lei (CHN)	1100
Fiderd Vis (ARU)	0000
Guillaume Elmont (NED)	0001
Damdinsürengiin Nyamkhüü (MGL)	0000
Abderramán Brenes (PUR)	0001
Giuseppe Maddaloni (ITA)	0020

Round of 16
Oscar Cardenas (CUB)	0000
João Neto (POR)	1000
Robert Krawczyk (POL)	0001
Kim Jae-Bum (KOR)	1100
Srđan Mrvaljević (MNE)	0111
Guo Lei (CHN)	0001
Guillaume Elmont (NED)	1001
Giuseppe Maddaloni (ITA)	0000

Quarterfinals
João Neto (POR)	0000
Kim Jae-Bum (KOR)	0001
Srđan Mrvaljević (MNE)	0000
Guillaume Elmont (NED)	0010

Semifinals
Kim Jae-Bum (KOR)	0001
Guillaume Elmont (NED)	0000

=== Repechage ===
First round
Azizov (AZE)	0001
Stevens (USA)	0200
Denanyoh (TOG)	0001
Valles (COL)	0100
Shundikov (BLR)	0010
Krawczyk (POL)	0011
Maddaloni (ITA)	0000
Nyamkhüü (MGL)	1000

Second round
Camilo (BRA)	0011
Stevens (USA)	0010
Burton (GBR)	0110
Valles (COL)	0001
Neto (POR)	0000
Krawczyk (POL)	1000
Mrvaljević (MNE)	0000
Nyamkhüü (MGL)	1002

Third round
Camilo (BRA)	0100
Burton (GBR)	0010
Krawczyk (POL)	0001
Nyamkhüü (MGL)	1010

Bronze medal finals
Elmont (NED)	0001
Camilo (BRA)	1100
Gontiuk (UKR)	0110
Nyamkhüü (MGL)	0100
