= Judo at the 2006 Asian Games – Men's 81 kg =

Judo competition

Men's 81 kg at the 2006 Asian Games
- Venue: Qatar SC Indoor Hall
- Date: 3 December 2006
- Competitors: 16 from 16 nations

Medalists
gold medal	Damdinsürengiin Nyamkhüü	Mongolia
silver medal	Almas Atayev	Kazakhstan
bronze medal	Guo Lei	China
bronze medal	Takashi Ono	Japan

The men's 81 kilograms (Half middleweight) competition at the 2006 Asian Games in Doha was held on 3 December at the Qatar SC Indoor Hall.

== Schedule ==
All times are Arabia Standard Time (UTC+03:00)

Date	Time	Event
Sunday, 3 December 2006	14:00	Round of 16
Sunday, 3 December 2006	14:00	Quarterfinals
Sunday, 3 December 2006	14:00	Repechage −1R
Sunday, 3 December 2006	14:00	Repechage final
Sunday, 3 December 2006	14:00	Semifinals
Sunday, 3 December 2006	14:00	Finals

== Results ==
=== Main bracket ===
Round of 16
John Baylon (PHI)	1110
Saeed Akhtar (PAK)	0010
Waleed Hanafi (QAT)	0000
Almas Atayev (KAZ)	1000
Georges Merheb (LIB)	0000
Abdullah Al-Otaibi (KUW)	1011
Rauf Hukmatov (TJK)	0000
Reza Chahkhandagh (IRI)	1000
Röwşen Amandurdyýew (TKM)	0001
Laziz Yuldashev (UZB)	1010
Guo Lei (CHN)	1000
Achilleus Ralli (THA)	0000
Iyad Halaby (PLE)	0000
Damdinsürengiin Nyamkhüü (MGL)	1000
Kwon Young-woo (KOR)	0000
Takashi Ono (JPN)	1000

Quarterfinals
John Baylon (PHI)	0000
Almas Atayev (KAZ)	1000
Abdullah Al-Otaibi (KUW)	0000
Reza Chahkhandagh (IRI)	1000
Laziz Yuldashev (UZB)	0001
Guo Lei (CHN)	0101
Damdinsürengiin Nyamkhüü (MGL)	0011
Takashi Ono (JPN)	0000

Semifinals
Almas Atayev (KAZ)	0002
Reza Chahkhandagh (IRI)	0000
Guo Lei (CHN)	0000
Damdinsürengiin Nyamkhüü (MGL)	0111

Gold medal contest
Almas Atayev (KAZ)	0000
Damdinsürengiin Nyamkhüü (MGL)	0011

=== Repechage ===
Repechage −1R
Waleed Hanafi (QAT)	0000
John Baylon (PHI)	1000
Rauf Hukmatov (TJK)	0200
Abdullah Al-Otaibi (KUW)	0000
Achilleus Ralli (THA)	1011
Laziz Yuldashev (UZB)	0001
Iyad Halaby (PLE)	0000
Takashi Ono (JPN)	1001

Repechage final
John Baylon (PHI)	0001
Rauf Hukmatov (TJK)	1010
Achilleus Ralli (THA)	0000
Takashi Ono (JPN)	0011

Bronze medal contest
Rauf Hukmatov (TJK)	0001
Guo Lei (CHN)	1001
Takashi Ono (JPN)	0002
Reza Chahkhandagh (IRI)	0000
