= Judo at the 1998 Asian Games – Men's 81 kg =

Judo competition

Men's 81 kg at the 1998 Asian Games
- Venue: Thammasat Gymnasium 1
- Date: 9 December 1998
- Competitors: 18 from 18 nations

Medalists
gold medal	Cho In-chul	South Korea
silver medal	Kwak Ok-chol	North Korea
bronze medal	Kazem Sarikhani	Iran
bronze medal	Ruslan Seilkhanov	Kazakhstan

The men's 81 kilograms (Half middleweight) competition at the 1998 Asian Games in Bangkok was held on 9 December 1998 at the Thammasat Gymnasium 1.

== Schedule ==
All times are Indochina Time (UTC+07:00)

Date	Time	Event
Wednesday, 9 December 1998	14:00	Round 1
Wednesday, 9 December 1998	14:00	Round 2
Wednesday, 9 December 1998	14:00	Quarterfinals
Wednesday, 9 December 1998	14:00	Repechage
Wednesday, 9 December 1998	14:00	Semifinals
Wednesday, 9 December 1998	14:00	Finals

== Results ==
Legend

- IPP — Won by ippon
- WAZ — Won by waza-ari
- WO — Won by walkover
- YUK — Won by yuko

=== Main bracket ===
==== Final ====
Final
Cho In-chul (KOR)	YUK
Kwak Ok-chol (PRK)

==== Top half ====
Round 1
Cho In-chul (KOR)	WO
Alisher Boqiev (TJK)

Round 2
Cho In-chul (KOR)	IPP
Musa Khalaf (JOR)
Xiao Deqiang (CHN)	IPP
Krisna Bayu (INA)
Surasak Rieanthong (THA)
Ruslan Seilkhanov (KAZ)	IPP
Khaled Al-Anezi (KUW)
Yashpal Solanki (IND)	WAZ

Quarterfinals
Cho In-chul (KOR)	YUK
Xiao Deqiang (CHN)
Ruslan Seilkhanov (KAZ)	IPP
Yashpal Solanki (IND)

Semifinals
Cho In-chul (KOR)	IPP
Ruslan Seilkhanov (KAZ)

==== Bottom half ====
Round 1
Kazem Sarikhani (IRI)	IPP
Lin Yu-ming (TPE)

Round 2
Kazem Sarikhani (IRI)	IPP
Farkhod Turayev (UZB)
Muhyadin Al-Ruhayem (SYR)
Tsend-Ayuushiin Ochirbat (MGL)	WO
Kazunori Kubota (JPN)	IPP
Ýewgeniý Mudriý (TKM)
Thaer Al-Natsheh (PLE)
Kwak Ok-chol (PRK)	IPP

Quarterfinals
Kazem Sarikhani (IRI)	IPP
Tsend-Ayuushiin Ochirbat (MGL)
Kazunori Kubota (JPN)
Kwak Ok-chol (PRK)	IPP

Semifinals
Kazem Sarikhani (IRI)
Kwak Ok-chol (PRK)	IPP

=== Repechage ===
Repechage 1
Alisher Boqiev (TJK)
Musa Khalaf (JOR)	WO
Lin Yu-ming (TPE)
Farkhod Turayev (UZB)	IPP

Repechage 2
Musa Khalaf (JOR)	IPP
Xiao Deqiang (CHN)
Surasak Rieanthong (THA)
Yashpal Solanki (IND)	IPP
Farkhod Turayev (UZB)	IPP
Tsend-Ayuushiin Ochirbat (MGL)
Thaer Al-Natsheh (PLE)
Kazunori Kubota (JPN)	IPP

Repechage 3
Musa Khalaf (JOR)
Yashpal Solanki (IND)	IPP
Farkhod Turayev (UZB)	IPP
Kazunori Kubota (JPN)

Bronze medals
Yashpal Solanki (IND)
Kazem Sarikhani (IRI)	IPP
Farkhod Turayev (UZB)
Ruslan Seilkhanov (KAZ)	IPP
