= Judo at the 2002 Asian Games – Men's 81 kg =

Judo competition

Men's 81 kg at the 2002 Asian Games
- Venue: Gudeok Gymnasium
- Date: 1 October 2002
- Competitors: 14 from 14 nations

Medalists
gold medal	Yoshihiro Akiyama	Japan
silver medal	Ahn Dong-jin	South Korea
bronze medal	Farkhod Turayev	Uzbekistan
bronze medal	Damdinsürengiin Nyamkhüü	Mongolia

The men's 81 kilograms (Half middleweight) competition at the 2002 Asian Games in Busan was held on 1 October at the Gudeok Gymnasium.

== Schedule ==
All times are Korea Standard Time (UTC+09:00)

Date	Time	Event
Tuesday, 1 October 2002	14:00	1 round
Tuesday, 1 October 2002	14:00	2 round
Tuesday, 1 October 2002	14:00	Repechage 1 round
Tuesday, 1 October 2002	14:00	Repechage 2 round
Tuesday, 1 October 2002	14:00	Semifinals
Tuesday, 1 October 2002	18:00	Finals

== Results ==
=== Main bracket ===
1 round
Alisher Karimov (TJK)	0010
Farkhod Turayev (UZB)	1100
Zhang Haifeng (CHN)	0010
Kazem Sarikhani (IRI)	1001
Damdinsürengiin Nyamkhüü (MGL)	1000
Chen Chang-ning (TPE)	0000
Ruslan Seilkhanov (KAZ)	0000
Ahn Dong-jin (KOR)	1000
Reza Naeimi (QAT)	0000
Erkin Ibragimov (KGZ)	0100
Ghanam Al-Dikan (KUW)	0000
John Baylon (PHI)	1000

2 round
Yoshihiro Akiyama (JPN)	1001
Farkhod Turayev (UZB)	0000
Yahya Al-Zahrani (KSA)	0000
Kazem Sarikhani (IRI)	1010
Damdinsürengiin Nyamkhüü (MGL)	0001
Ahn Dong-jin (KOR)	0101
Erkin Ibragimov (KGZ)	1100
John Baylon (PHI)	0000

Semifinals
Yoshihiro Akiyama (JPN)	0010
Kazem Sarikhani (IRI)	0001
Ahn Dong-jin (KOR)	1001
Erkin Ibragimov (KGZ)	0000

Final
Yoshihiro Akiyama (JPN)	0010
Ahn Dong-jin (KOR)	0010

=== Repechage ===
Repechage 1 round
Zhang Haifeng (CHN)	1000
Yahya Al-Zahrani (KSA)	0001
Ruslan Seilkhanov (KAZ)	0010
Damdinsürengiin Nyamkhüü (MGL)	1001
Reza Naeimi (QAT)	0000
John Baylon (PHI)	1010

Repechage 2 round
Farkhod Turayev (UZB)	1100
Zhang Haifeng (CHN)	0100
Damdinsürengiin Nyamkhüü (MGL)	1000
John Baylon (PHI)	0000

Bronze medal match
Farkhod Turayev (UZB)	1021
Erkin Ibragimov (KGZ)	0001
Damdinsürengiin Nyamkhüü (MGL)	1000
Kazem Sarikhani (IRI)	0000
