= Roman Hontyuk =

Ukrainian judoka (born 1984)

Personal information
- Born: 2 February 1984 (age 42)
- Occupation: Judoka

Sport
- Country: Ukraine
- Sport: Judo
- Weight class: –81 kg

Achievements and titles
- Olympic Games: (silver) (2004)
- World Champ.: (bronze) (2005)
- European Champ.: 9th (2004)
Medal record
Men's judo
Representing Ukraine
Olympic Games
| Silver medal – second place | 2004 Athens | ‍–‍81 kg |
| Bronze medal – third place | 2008 Beijing | ‍–‍81 kg |
World Championships
| Bronze medal – third place | 2005 Cairo | ‍–‍81 kg |
IJF Grand Slam
| Silver medal – second place | 2012 Paris | ‍–‍90 kg |
World Juniors Championships
| Silver medal – second place | 2002 Jeju | ‍–‍81 kg |
European Junior Championships
| Gold medal – first place | 2001 Budapest | ‍–‍81 kg |
| Gold medal – first place | 2002 Rotterdam | ‍–‍81 kg |
European Cadet Championships
| Bronze medal – third place | 2000 Oradea | ‍–‍81 kg |

Profile at external databases
- IJF: 3066, 52931
- JudoInside.com: 12541
- Updated on 30 May 2023

Roman Volodymyrovych Hontyuk (Ukrainian: Роман Володимирович Гонтюк), also spelled Roman Gontyuk, (born 2 February 1984) is an Olympic medalist from Ukraine. He won a silver medal in the half-middleweight (‍–‍81 kg) division at the 2004 Summer Olympics and bronze medal in the half-middleweight (‍–‍81 kg) division at the 2008 Summer Olympics in Beijing. Hontyuk is the Merited Master of Sports of Ukraine.

== Olympic journey at Athens 2004 ==
Hontyuk's Olympic debut started with his match against Adil Belgaid of Morocco, which Hontyuk won. Making his way through the competition, he defeated Reza Chahkhandagh of Iran and world champion Florian Wanner. In the semifinals against Robert Krawczyk of Poland, Roman won by ippon with only 5 seconds left in the match and headed to the final. In the gold medal match against Ilias Iliadis, Ilias defeated Roman by ippon, leaving Hontyuk with the silver medal.

== Achievements ==
| Year | Tournament | Place | Weight class |
|---|---|---|---|
| 2008 | 2008 Summer Olympics | 3rd | Half-middleweight (81 kg) |
| 2008 | World Cup Vienna | 5th | Half-middleweight (81 kg) |
| 2008 | Super World Cup Tournoi de Paris | 1st | Half-middleweight (81 kg) |
| 2007 | Grand Prix Yerevan | 1st | Half-middleweight (81 kg) |
| 2007 | World Cup Baku | 1st | Half-middleweight (81 kg) |
| 2007 | Super World Cup Rotterdam | 5th | Half-middleweight (81 kg) |
| 2007 | 2007 World Judo Championships | 39th | Half-middleweight (81 kg) |
| 2006 | European Club Cup final Budapest | 3rd | Half-middleweight (81 kg) |
| 2006 | World Cup Boras | 1st | Middleweight(90 kg) |
| 2005 | 2005 World Judo Championships | 3rd | Half-middleweight (81 kg) |
| 2004 | World University Championships Moscow | 3rd | Middleweight(90 kg) |
| 2004 | 2004 Summer Olympics | 2nd | Half-middleweight (81 kg) |
| 2004 | A-Tournament Tbilisi | 2nd | Half-middleweight (81 kg) |
| 2004 | A-Tournament Budapest | 2nd | Half-middleweight (81 kg) |
| 2003 | European Team Championships London | 3rd | Half-middleweight (81 kg) |
| 2003 | A-Tournament Warsaw | 3rd | Half-middleweight (81 kg) |
| 2003 | Super A-Tournament Moscow | 3rd | Half-middleweight (81 kg) |
| 2002 | European Junior Championships Rotterdam | 1st | Half-middleweight (81 kg) |
| 2002 | World Junior Championships U20 Jeju Island Korea | 2nd | Half-middleweight (81 kg) |
| 2001 | European U20 Championships Budapest | 1st | Half-middleweight (81 kg) |
| 2001 | A-Tournament U20 Cetniewo | 2nd | Half-middleweight (81 kg) |
| 2001 | A-Tournament Minsk | 5th | Half-middleweight (81 kg) |
| 2000 | European Championships Cadets U17 Oradea | 3rd | Half-middleweight (81 kg) |

Olympic Games
| Preceded by Yana Klochkova | Flagbearer for Ukraine; London 2012 | Succeeded by Mykola Milchev |
