= Kwon Young-woo =

South Korean Olympic judoka

Personal information
- Nationality: South Korea
- Born: 12 April 1981 (age 45) Seoul, South Korea
- Occupation: Judoka
- Height: 1.76 m (5 ft 9 in)

Korean name
- Hangul: 권영우
- RR: Gwon Yeongu
- MR: Kwŏn Yŏngu

Sport
- Country: South Korea
- Sport: Judo
- Weight class: –81 kg

Achievements and titles
- Olympic Games: 7th (2004)
- World Champ.: 7th (2007)
- Asian Champ.: (gold) (2007)
Medal record
Men's judo
Representing South Korea
Asian Championships
| Gold medal – first place | 2007 Kuwait City | –81 kg |
| Silver medal – second place | 2003 Jeju | –81 kg |
| Bronze medal – third place | 2004 Almaty | –81 kg |
World Juniors Championships
| Bronze medal – third place | 2000 Nabeul | –81 kg |
Summer Universiade
| Gold medal – first place | 2001 Beijing | –81 kg |
| Gold medal – first place | 2003 Jeju | –81 kg |

Profile at external databases
- IJF: 2260
- JudoInside.com: 13199
- Updated on 23 February 2022

Kwon Young-woo (Korean: 권영우; born 12 April 1981, in Seoul) is a South Korean judoka, who competed in the men's middleweight category. He captured two golds in the 81-kg division at the Summer Universiade (2001 and 2003), completed a full set of medals at the Asian Judo Championships, and later finished seventh at the 2004 Summer Olympics.

Kwon emerged as a frontrunner and a medal contender at the 2001 Summer Universiade in Beijing, China, where he took home the gold in the 81-kg class against Azerbaijan's Mehman Azizov. Two years later, Kwon defeated Spain's Óscar Fernández for an unprecedented second straight gold in his respective division.

Kwon qualified for the South Korean squad in the men's half-middleweight class (81 kg) at the 2004 Summer Olympics in Athens, by placing third and receiving a berth from the Asian Championships in Almaty, Kazakhstan. He thwarted France's Cédric Claverie and Cuba's Gabriel Arteaga in the prelims by a waza-ari and a yuko score, before being sanctioned with a penalty and falling short to Greek judoka and eventual Olympic champion Ilias Iliadis in a sudden-death quarterfinal match. In the repechage round, Kwon ran off from his temporary falter with an effortless victory over Australia's Morgan Endicott-Davies, but fell short in a tremendous ippon to Brazilian judoka Flávio Canto within twenty-seven seconds, ending him in the seventh spot.
