= Oscar Cardenas =

Cuban judoka (born 1982)

Personal information
- Nationality: Cuba
- Born: 11 August 1982 (age 43) Havana, Cuba
- Occupation: Judoka
- Height: 1.80 m (5 ft 11 in)
- Weight: 81 kg (179 lb)

Sport
- Sport: Judo
- Event: 81 kg
Medal record
Men's judo
Representing Cuba
Pan American Games
Bronze medal – third place	2007 Rio de Janeiro	81 kg

Profile at external databases
- JudoInside.com: 38826

Oscar Cardenas (born August 11, 1982, in Havana) is a Cuban judoka, who played for the half-middleweight category. He is a two-time national judo champion, and also, a bronze medalist for his respective category at the 2007 Pan American Games in Rio de Janeiro, Brazil.

Cardenas qualified for the men's half-middleweight class (81 kg) at the 2008 Summer Olympics in Beijing, after claiming a bronze medal at the Pan American Qualifying Tournament in Miami, Florida. He defeated Anthony Rodriguez of France, with a waza-ari (half-score point), in the first preliminary match, but lost his next match a few hours later, to Portugal's João Neto, who automatically scored an ippon at one minute and twenty-five seconds.
