= Masahiko Tomouchi =

Japanese judoka (born 1977)

Personal information
- Born: 13 July 1977 (age 48) Ōmuta, Fukuoka, Japan
- Occupation: Judoka
- Height: 1.73 m (5 ft 8 in)

Sport
- Country: Japan
- Sport: Judo
- Weight class: –81 kg

Achievements and titles
- Olympic Games: 13th (2004)
- World Champ.: R16 (2009)
- Asian Champ.: (bronze) (2004)
Medal record
Men's judo
Representing Japan
Asian Championships
Bronze medal – third place	2004 Almaty	–81 kg
IJF Grand Slam
Gold medal – first place	2008 Tokyo	–81 kg
Bronze medal – third place	2009 Rio de Janeiro	–81 kg

Profile at external databases
- IJF: 11674
- JudoInside.com: 1057
- Updated on 28 November 2022

Masahiko Tomouchi (塘内 将彦, Tomouchi Masahiko; born 13 July 1977 in Ōmuta, Fukuoka) is a Japanese judoka, who competed in the men's half-middleweight category. He picked up a bronze medal in the 81-kg division at the 2004 Asian Judo Championships in Almaty, Kazakhstan, and later represented his nation Japan at the 2004 Summer Olympics.

Tomouchi qualified for the Japanese squad in the men's half-middleweight class (81 kg) at the 2004 Summer Olympics in Athens, by placing third and receiving a berth from the Asian Championships in Almaty, Kazakhstan. He got off to a rough start with a waza-ari awasete ippon defeat from Russia's Dmitri Nossov in his opening match, but bounced back to compete for the bronze medal after Nossov qualified for the final. In the repechage round, Tomouchi could not tightly grapple Italy's Roberto Meloni with a kata guruma (shoulder wheel), and lost the match again after the five-minute limit.
