= Edmond Topalli =

Albanian Olympic judoka (born 1980)

Personal information
- Nationality: Albania
- Born: 22 January 1980 (age 46)
- Height: 1.75 m (5 ft 9 in)
- Weight: 81 kg (179 lb)

Sport
- Sport: Judo
- Event: 81 kg

Edmond Topalli (born 22 January 1980 in Shkodër) is an Albanian judoka, who played for the half-middleweight category. Topalli represented Albania at the 2008 Summer Olympics in Beijing, where he competed for the men's half-middleweight class (81 kg). He received a bye for the second preliminary match, before losing out by an automatic ippon and a sode tsurikomi goshi (sleeve lifting and pulling hip throw) to Portugal's João Neto.
