= Turayev =

Turayev is a surname. Notable people with the surname include:

- Boris Turayev (1868–1920), Russian scholar
- Farkhod Turayev (born 1974), Uzbekistani judoka
