= Grigol Mamrikishvili =

Georgian judoka (born 1981)

Personal information
- Full name: Grigori Mamrikishvili
- Born: 2 March 1981 (age 45) Tbilisi, Georgian SSR, Soviet Union
- Occupation: Judoka
- Height: 1.80 m (5 ft 11 in)

Sport
- Country: Georgia
- Sport: Judo
- Weight class: ‍–‍81 kg, ‍–‍90 kg

Achievements and titles
- Olympic Games: R32 (2004)
- World Champ.: R16 (2001)
- European Champ.: 7th (2005)
Medal record
Men's judo
Representing Georgia
European U23 Championships
Bronze medal – third place	2003 Yerevan	‍–‍81 kg
World Juniors Championships
Gold medal – first place	2000 Nabeul	‍–‍81 kg

Profile at external databases
- IJF: 5935
- JudoInside.com: 406
- Updated on 13 February 2022

Grigori Mamrikishvili (also Grigol Mamrikishvili, Georgian: გრიგოლ მამრიკიშვილი; born 2 March 1981 in Tbilisi, Georgian SSR) is a Georgian judoka, who competed in the men's half-middleweight category. He picked up a total of ten medals in his career, including four from the World Judo Cup series and a bronze from the 2003 European U23 Championships in Nabeul, Tunisia, and represented his nation Georgia at the 2004 Summer Olympics, competing in the ‍–‍81 kg class.

Mamrikishvili qualified for the Georgian squad in the men's half-middleweight category (81 kg) at the 2004 Summer Olympics in Athens, by topping the field of judoka and granting a berth from the A-Tournament in his native Tbilisi. He lost his opening match to an experienced Estonian judoka and 2000 Olympic bronze medalist Aleksei Budõlin, who tossed him to the tatami for a waza-ari and an additional yuko point to close the five-minute bout.
