= Claverie (surname) =

Claverie is a surname. Notable people with the surname include:

- Carlos Claverie (born 1996), Venezuelan swimmer
- Cédric Claverie (born 1976), French judoka
- Charles Claverie (1949–2005), better known as Charles Rocket, American actor
- Pierre Claverie (1938–1996), French Roman Catholic priest

== See also ==
- Isabelle Boni-Claverie, French screenwriter and film director
