= José Miguel Boissard =

Dominican judoka (born 1978)

Personal information
- Full name: José Miguel Boissard Ramírez
- Nationality: Dominican Republic
- Born: 4 December 1978 (age 47) San Cristóbal, Dominican; Republic
- Height: 1.86 m (6 ft 1 in)
- Weight: 81 kg (179 lb)

Sport
- Sport: Judo
- Event: 81 kg

José Miguel Boissard Ramírez (born December 4, 1978, in San Cristóbal) is a judoka from the Dominican Republic, who competed in the men's half-middleweight category. He picked up a total of twelve medals in his career, including two bronzes from the Pan American Judo Championships, attained a fifth-place finish in the 81-kg division at the 2003 Pan American Games in Santo Domingo, and represented his nation Dominican Republic at the 2004 Summer Olympics.

Boissard qualified for the Dominican Republic squad in the men's half-middleweight category at the 2004 Summer Olympics in Athens, by placing seventh and receiving a berth from the Pan American Championships in Margarita Island, Venezuela. He lost his opening match to Germany's Florian Wanner, who placed him into an upper four-quarter hold (kami shiho gatame) to score an ippon victory at one minute and twenty-three seconds.
