= Saba Gavashelishvili =

Georgian judoka (born 1987)

Personal information
- Born: 5 December 1987 (age 38)
- Occupation: Judoka
- Height: 1.75 m (5 ft 9 in)

Sport
- Country: Georgia
- Sport: Judo
- Weight class: –81 kg, –90 kg

Achievements and titles
- Olympic Games: R64 (2008)
Medal record
Men's judo
Representing Georgia
European U23 Championships
Bronze medal – third place	2005 Kyiv	–81 kg
European Cadet Championships
Gold medal – first place	2002 Győr	–81 kg

Profile at external databases
- IJF: 2406
- JudoInside.com: 25770
- Updated on 11 February 2022

Saba Gavashelishvili (Georgian: საბა გავაშელიშვილი; born December 15, 1987) is a Georgian judoka, who played for the half-middleweight category. He is a two-time Georgian judo champion, and a silver medalist for his division at the 2008 IJF World Cup Series in Prague, Czech Republic.

Gavashelishvili represented Georgia at the 2008 Summer Olympics in Beijing, where he competed for the men's half-middleweight class (81 kg). He lost the first preliminary round match, by an ippon and a sankaku-jime (triangle choke), to Portugal's João Neto.
