= Gábor Neu =

Hungarian judoka (born 1981)

Personal information
- Born: 19 May 1981 (age 45)
- Occupation: Judoka

Sport
- Country: Hungary
- Sport: Judo
- Weight class: –66 kg

Achievements and titles
- European Champ.: 7th (2001)
Medal record
Men's judo
Representing Hungary
European U23 Championships
Gold medal – first place	2003 Yerevan	–66 kg

Profile at external databases
- JudoInside.com: 11259
- Updated on 13 February 2022

Gábor Neu (born 19 May 1981) is a Hungarian judoka.

== Achievements ==
Year	Tournament	Place	Weight class
2003	Universiade	3rd	Half lightweight (66 kg)
2001	European Judo Championships	7th	Half lightweight (66 kg)
