= Krisztián Tölgyesi =

Hungarian judoka

Personal information
- Nationality: Hungarian
- Born: 27 June 1975 (age 49); Budapest, Hungary

Sport
- Sport: Judo

Krisztián Tölgyesi (born 27 June 1975) is a Hungarian judoka. He competed in the men's half-middleweight event at the 2000 Summer Olympics.
