= Cho In-chul =

South Korean judoka (born 1976)

Personal information
- Born: 4 March 1976 (age 50)
- Occupation: Judoka

Korean name
- Hangul: 조인철
- Hanja: 趙麟徹
- RR: Jo Incheol
- MR: Cho Inch'ŏl

Sport
- Country: South Korea
- Sport: Judo
- Weight class: ‍–‍78 kg, ‍–‍81 kg

Achievements and titles
- Olympic Games: (silver) (2000)
- World Champ.: (gold) (1997, 2001)
- Asian Champ.: (gold) (1998)
Medal record
Men's judo
Representing South Korea
Olympic Games
Silver medal – second place	2000 Sydney	‍–‍81 kg
Bronze medal – third place	1996 Atlanta	‍–‍78 kg
World Championships
Gold medal – first place	1997 Paris	‍–‍78 kg
Gold medal – first place	2001 Munich	‍–‍81 kg
Bronze medal – third place	1999 Birmingham	‍–‍81 kg
Asian Games
Gold medal – first place	1998 Bangkok	‍–‍81 kg
Asian Championships
Silver medal – second place	1995 New Delhi	‍–‍78 kg
Silver medal – second place	1996 Ho Chi Minh	‍–‍78 kg
East Asian Games
Gold medal – first place	1997 Busan	‍–‍78 kg
Gold medal – first place	2001 Osaka	‍–‍81 kg
World Juniors Championships
Silver medal – second place	1994 Cairo	‍–‍78 kg
Summer Universiade
Silver medal – second place	1995 Fukuoka	‍–‍78 kg

Profile at external databases
- IJF: 10187
- JudoInside.com: 6437
- Updated on 31 May 2023

Cho In-Chul (Korean: 조인철; born 4 March 1976) won three medals at the World Judo Championships (of which two gold and one bronze) and two olympic medals (a bronze in the 1996 Olympic Games and a silver at the Sydney Olympic Games).

== Personal life ==
After earning a PhD in sports psychology, Cho was named a full professor at Yong-In University.
