= Ricardo Echarte =

Spanish judoka

Personal information
- Born: 4 October 1974 (age 52)
- Occupation: Judoka

Sport
- Country: Spain
- Sport: Judo
- Weight class: –81 kg

Achievements and titles
- Olympic Games: R32 (2000, 2004)
- World Champ.: 5th (2003)
- European Champ.: (silver) (2000)
Medal record
Men's judo
Representing Spain
European Championships
Silver medal – second place	2000 Wrocław	–81 kg
Bronze medal – third place	2004 Bucharest	–81 kg

Profile at external databases
- IJF: 4922
- JudoInside.com: 3451
- Updated on 17 November 2022

Ricardo Echarte (born 4 October 1974) is a Spanish judoka.

== Achievements ==
Year	Tournament	Place	Weight class
2004	European Judo Championships	3rd	Half middleweight (81 kg)
2003	World Judo Championships	5th	Half middleweight (81 kg)
2000	European Judo Championships	2nd	Half middleweight (81 kg)
