= 2003 European U23 Judo Championships =

Judo competition

Judo 2003 European U23 Judo Championships
- Location: Yerevan, Armenia
- Dates: 3–4 May 2003

Competition at external databases
- Links: JudoInside

The 2003 European U23 Judo Championships is an edition of the European U23 Judo Championships, organised by the International Judo Federation. It was held in Yerevan, Armenia from 3 to 4 May 2003.

== Medal summary ==
=== Medal table ===
* Host nation (Armenia)

Rank	Nation	Gold	Silver	Bronze	Total
1	Russia (RUS)	6	3	3	12
2	Ukraine (UKR)	2	4	5	11
3	Hungary (HUN)	2	1	1	4
4	Greece (GRE)	2	0	3	5
5	Armenia (ARM)*	1	2	4	7
6	Italy (ITA)	1	1	1	3
7	Georgia (GEO)	0	2	2	4
8	Romania (ROU)	0	1	6	7
9	Lithuania (LTU)	0	0	2	2
10	Latvia (LAT)	0	0	1	1
Totals (10 entries)		14	14	28	56

=== Men's events ===
Event	Gold	Silver	Bronze
Extra-lightweight (−60 kg)	Armen Nazaryan (ARM)	Valentyn Efimov (UKR)	Maxim Bodin (RUS)
Extra-lightweight (−60 kg)	Armen Nazaryan (ARM)	Valentyn Efimov (UKR)	Saulius Gadisauskas (LTU)
Half-lightweight (−66 kg)	Gábor Neu (HUN)	Mindia Khomizuri (GEO)	Ghazaros Grigoryan (ARM)
Half-lightweight (−66 kg)	Gábor Neu (HUN)	Mindia Khomizuri (GEO)	Tariel Zintiridis (GRE)
Lightweight (−73 kg)	Ilias Iliadis (GRE)	Varuzhan Israyelyan (ARM)	Dmitry Bogatyrev (RUS)
Lightweight (−73 kg)	Ilias Iliadis (GRE)	Varuzhan Israyelyan (ARM)	Ruslan Lushnikov (UKR)
Half-middleweight (−81 kg)	Ruslan Gadzhiev (RUS)	Sergiy Balaban (UKR)	Lorenzo Bagnoli (ITA)
Half-middleweight (−81 kg)	Ruslan Gadzhiev (RUS)	Sergiy Balaban (UKR)	Grigol Mamrikishvili (GEO)
Middleweight (−90 kg)	Muslim Gadzhimagomedov (RUS)	Bruno Ivan Tomasetti (ITA)	Marius Bucsa (ROU)
Middleweight (−90 kg)	Muslim Gadzhimagomedov (RUS)	Bruno Ivan Tomasetti (ITA)	Alexander Sapelka (LAT)
Half-heavyweight (−100 kg)	Vitaliy Bubon (UKR)	Sergey Sedykh (RUS)	Dionysios Iliadis (GRE)
Half-heavyweight (−100 kg)	Vitaliy Bubon (UKR)	Sergey Sedykh (RUS)	Lasha Peikrishvili (GEO)
Heavyweight (+100 kg)	Gadzhimurad Muslimov (RUS)	Lasha Gujejiani (GEO)	Gevorg Barseghyan (ARM)
Heavyweight (+100 kg)	Gadzhimurad Muslimov (RUS)	Lasha Gujejiani (GEO)	Vitaliy Polyanskyy (UKR)

=== Women's events ===
Event	Gold	Silver	Bronze
Extra-lightweight (−48 kg)	Éva Csernoviczki (HUN)	Natalia Zaikina (UKR)	Carmen Bogdan (ROU)
Extra-lightweight (−48 kg)	Éva Csernoviczki (HUN)	Natalia Zaikina (UKR)	Lyutsia Giniyatullina (RUS)
Half-lightweight (−52 kg)	Lyudmila Bogdanova (RUS)	Anush Hakobyan (ARM)	Tatiana Chyk (UKR)
Half-lightweight (−52 kg)	Lyudmila Bogdanova (RUS)	Anush Hakobyan (ARM)	Carmen Galicza (ROU)
Lightweight (−57 kg)	Ioulietta Boukouvala (GRE)	Bernadett Baczkó (HUN)	Alina Micu (ROU)
Lightweight (−57 kg)	Ioulietta Boukouvala (GRE)	Bernadett Baczkó (HUN)	Anna Nikitina (UKR)
Half-middleweight (−63 kg)	Laura Bucchi (ITA)	Maria Schedrukhina (RUS)	Cristina Baban (ROU)
Half-middleweight (−63 kg)	Laura Bucchi (ITA)	Maria Schedrukhina (RUS)	Maryna Kryvonosova (UKR)
Middleweight (−70 kg)	Natalia Kazantseva (RUS)	Mirela Livia Vasilan (ROU)	Anita Budai (HUN)
Middleweight (−70 kg)	Natalia Kazantseva (RUS)	Mirela Livia Vasilan (ROU)	Karine Ghevondyan (ARM)
Half-heavyweight (−78 kg)	Mariya Semenyuk (UKR)	Evgenia Skvortsova (RUS)	Varvara Akritidou (GRE)
Half-heavyweight (−78 kg)	Mariya Semenyuk (UKR)	Evgenia Skvortsova (RUS)	Svetlana Antonyan (ARM)
Heavyweight (+78 kg)	Anaid Mkhitaryan (RUS)	Anna Brazhko (UKR)	Meile Stonyte (LTU)
Heavyweight (+78 kg)	Anaid Mkhitaryan (RUS)	Anna Brazhko (UKR)	Simona Vasiloaie (ROU)

Source Results
