= Alvaro Paseyro =

Uruguayan judoka (born 1968)

Álvaro Paseyro
Personal information
- Full name: Álvaro S. Paseyro
- Nationality: Uruguayan
- Born: 27 November 1968 (age 56); France
- Height: 180 cm (5 ft 11 in)
- Weight: 81 kg (179 lb)

Sport
- Sport: Judo

Álvaro Paseyro (born 27 November 1968) is a Uruguayan judoka. He competed in the men's half-middleweight event at the 2000 Summer Olympics.
