= Yoshihiro Akiyama =

Japanese judoka and mixed martial arts fighter

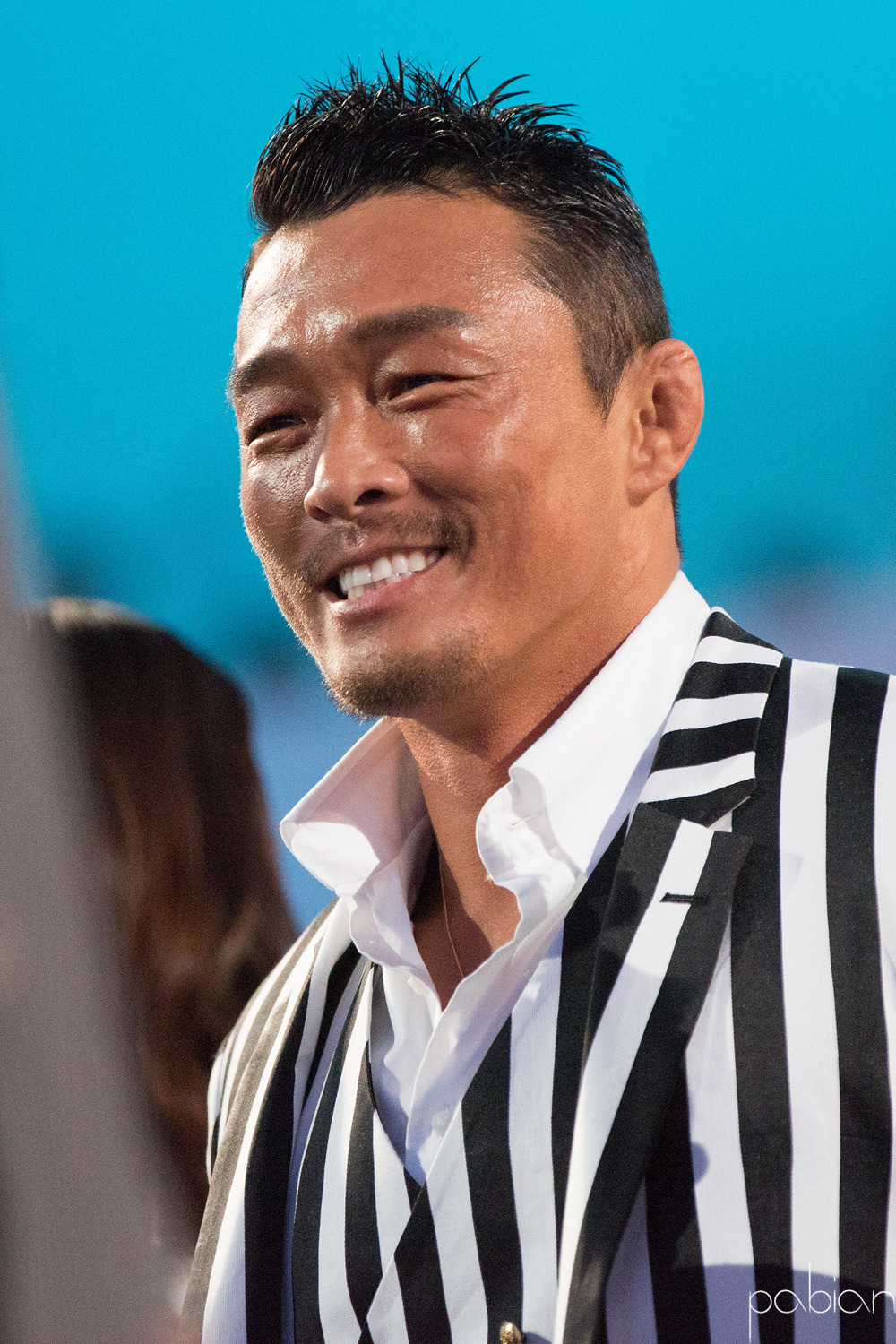
- Akiyama in 2017
- Born: July 29, 1975 (age 51); Osaka, Japan
- Native name: 秋山成勲 / 추성훈
- Other names: Sexyama
- Height: 5 ft 10 in (178 cm)
- Weight: 170 lb (77 kg; 12 st 2 lb)
- Division: Middleweight; Welterweight; Lightweight
- Reach: 75 in (191 cm)
- Style: Judo
- Stance: Orthodox
- Fighting out of: Osaka, Japan
- Team: Team Cloud; Jackson's Submission Fighting
- Rank: 3rd dan black belt in Judo
- Years active: 2004–present

Mixed martial arts record
- Total: 26
- Wins: 16
- By knockout: 7
- By submission: 7
- By decision: 2
- Losses: 8
- By knockout: 2
- By submission: 1
- By decision: 5
- No contests: 2

Other information
- Mixed martial arts record from Sherdog
- Judo career
- Weight class: ‍–‍81 kg
- Rank: 3rd dan black belt

Judo achievements and titles
- World Champ.: 5th (2003)
- Asian Champ.: (gold) (2001, 2002)
Medal record
Men's judo
Representing Japan
Asian Games
Gold medal – first place	2002 Busan	‍–‍81 kg
Representing South Korea
Asian Championships
Gold medal – first place	2001 Ulaanbaatar	‍–‍81 kg

Profile at external judo databases
- IJF: 58544
- JudoInside.com: 11360, 20119
- Last updated on: October 17, 2010

Yoshihiro Akiyama

Japanese name
- Kanji: 秋山成勲
- Hiragana: あきやま よしひろ
Transcriptions
- Revised Hepburn: Akiyama Yoshihiro
- Kunrei-shiki: Akiyama Yosihiro

Korean name
- Hangul: 추성훈
- Hanja: 秋成勳
Transcriptions
- Revised Romanization: Chu Seonghun
- McCune–Reischauer: Ch'u Sŏnghun

Yoshihiro Akiyama (Japanese: 秋山 成勲; born July 29, 1975), also known as Choo Sung-hoon (Korean: 추성훈) and by his nickname Sexyama, is a Japanese former mixed martial artist and judoka who won the gold medal at the 2001 Asian Championships for South Korea and for Japan at the 2002 Asian Games. He is the former K-1 HERO's Light Heavyweight Grand Prix Tournament Champion.

== Judo career ==
Before his professional mixed martial arts career, Akiyama was a decorated Judoka. He began training in Judo at the age of three. He has also trained karate, boxing, kickboxing, wrestling and also submission wrestling with Greg Jackson.

=== 2001 Asian championships ===
Representing South Korea, Choo won the gold medal at the 2001 Asian Judo Championships.

=== 2002 Asian Games ===
Representing Japan, Akiyama won the gold medal at the 2002 Asian Games defeating Ahn Dong-Jin of South Korea in the finals.

=== 2003 World Judo Championships controversy ===
Akiyama defeated three opponents from France, Mongolia and Turkey to reach the semi-finals of the 81 kg Light Middleweight division. However, all three opponents claimed that Akiyama had a slippery judogi. Wearing a reserve gi, Akiyama lost two games in a row (semifinal and 3rd-place match) and missed the medal.

International Judo Federation referee director Juan Carlos Barcos said an examination of the gi found that the slippery texture was due to high humidity which prevailed in Osaka and a detergent used to wash the uniform. "At any moment, we did not have any doubt about fair play in the case. We are absolutely sure that Mr. Akiyama is correct," since he changed the jacket at the request of the jury, Barcos said.

Akiyama was also accused of wearing slippery gear by former world and Olympic champion Kenzo Nakamura when they fought at the world championship trials in 2002.

== Mixed martial arts career ==
=== HERO'S ===
Akiyama's mixed martial arts debut was in the K-1 Premium 2004 Dynamite event on December 31, 2004, where he defeated boxer Francois Botha by armbar submission in the first round. His first defeat was to Jerome LeBanner, who knocked him out with knees in his second fight at the HERO'S 1 event on March 26, 2005, although LeBanner is a heavyweight that came into the fight at 262 pounds (119 kg), while Akiyama came into the fight at 189.5 pounds (86 kg). He has notable wins against Tokimitsu Ishizawa, Taiei Kin, Kestutis Smirnovas and Melvin Manhoef. Akiyama defeated Melvin Manhoef at the Hero's light-heavyweight Grand Prix 2006 final round, and gained the champion belt.

In K-1 Premium 2006 Dynamite, Akiyama fought the legendary Kazushi Sakuraba in the main event. During the match, Sakuraba called to the referee saying "[Akiyama is] Slippery!" Akiyama went on to win the match with a referee stoppage. This created a controversy amongst MMA fans in Japan, assuming Akiyama was using some sort of body oil or lubricant, banned in K-1 rules. But at this moment, Akiyama answered to questions about the oil in the interview as follows: "I have no idea why Sakuraba felt slippery. It may be my sweat, as I sweat a lot always and it often drips off my body."

On January 11, Akiyama and FEG (the parent company of K-1) held a press conference during which Akiyama said he used Olay lotion prior to the fight claiming that the lotion was used to treat a worn gi. Pre-fight footage also showed Akiyama casually applying six bottles of lotion to his body in his locker room. As a result, Akiyama was disqualified and his prize money was suspended. Akiyama himself was suspended indefinitely from HERO'S competition six days later. Public outcry against Akiyama did not cease however, and Nike was swamped with complaints when Akiyama was featured on a television commercial in Japan. Though Akiyama has admitted to applying cream to his skin, he has said that the purpose was not to gain an unfair advantage but to treat his dry skin. The fight was ruled a "No Contest".

Akiyama was cleared from his FEG-induced suspension and FEG announced that Akiyama would return to K-1 Hero's in Seoul, on October 28, 2007. His opponent was Denis Kang, who was the finalist of PRIDE Bushido Grand Prix 2006 and making his debut in Hero's. Though he was an underdog, Akiyama beat Kang by KO in the first round.

=== Yarennoka! fight ===
On December 31, 2007, Akiyama faced Kazuo Misaki at Yarennoka!. The rules of the match stated that kicks to the head of a downed opponent would not be allowed. Late in the first round Misaki knocked down Akiyama with left hook, and as Akiyama struggled to his feet, Misaki delivered a lunging kick to the face which knocked Akiyama out. The match was ruled a knockout victory for Misaki, but Akiyama contended that one or both of his hands were on the mat at the time of the kick, which would make the kick a foul under the Yarennoka! rules. After reviewing video of the knockout, the Yarennoka! executive committee agreed; the official result was changed to a no contest.

=== Ultimate Fighting Championship ===
On February 24, 2009, it was announced on the official UFC website that Akiyama had signed a deal with the company. Akiyama made his debut against Alan Belcher at UFC 100 on July 11. Despite suffering a broken orbital, he won by split decision (30–27, 28–29, 29–28). It was the 1st fight in Akiyama's career that went to the judges' score cards. The bout was also awarded "Fight of the Night" honors, granting both fighters a record-setting $100,000 bonus each.

On May 30, 2009, Akiyama opened a new gym in Tokyo, Japan. The 'Akiyama Dojo' has Judo and MMA halls, 30 tatami mats and three octagonal cages.

Akiyama joined Xtreme Couture for the month of October 2009 to work on his striking skills. Akiyama was expected to face MMA legend and former PRIDE Middleweight Champion Wanderlei Silva on February 21, 2010, at UFC 110, but Silva instead faced British striker Michael Bisping on the card, winning via unanimous decision. At the Post-fight conference, UFC President Dana White stated that Akiyama had requested to fight Silva for a while and has refused to fight other opponents, after which both fighters verbally agreed to fight.

Akiyama was expected to face Silva on July 3, 2010, at UFC 116. Wanderlei had to pull out on June 22, 2010, due to fractured ribs suffered in training. Chris Leben was chosen as a replacement. Despite controlling the majority of the fight with effective strikes and solid Judo takedowns, Akiyama became fatigued after the first round and lost via triangle choke with just twenty seconds left in the third round. His loss to Leben was his first official loss in five years.

Akiyama lost to Michael Bisping on October 16, 2010, at UFC 120 by unanimous decision. In preparation for his fight with Bisping, Akiyama switched to Jackson's Submission Fighting in Albuquerque, New Mexico. It is unclear whether the switch is permanent. Even though Akiyama lost to Bisping, he rocked him in the first round. He earned his third "Fight of the Night" honors. He has now earned "Fight of the Night" honors for all three of his UFC appearances.

Akiyama was briefly scheduled to face Chael Sonnen on March 19, 2011, at UFC 128, but, due to Sonnen's suspension, the fight was scrapped. Akiyama was later scheduled to face Nate Marquardt at the same event, but pulled out due to the 2011 Tōhoku earthquake and tsunami and was replaced by Dan Miller.

Akiyama was defeated by Vitor Belfort at UFC 133 via KO (Punches) in the first round. This defeat marked the third straight loss for Akiyama in the UFC. Following the fight, Dana White stated that Akiyama most likely would not be cut from the organization if he agrees to move down to welterweight. As of September 3, 2011, Akiyama has stated he will move down a weight class, allowing him to stay in the UFC. On November 3, 2011, a picture of Akiyama had circled the web of his body frame as a welterweight.

Akiyama faced Jake Shields on February 26, 2012, at UFC 144. He lost the fight via unanimous decision (30–27, 30–27, 30–27). During the bout, Akiyama was able to utilize multiple judo techniques which was praised as the main highlights of the fight; despite losing the decision.

Akiyama was expected to face Thiago Alves on July 21, 2012, at UFC 149. However, Akiyama was forced out of the bout with an injury.

Akiyama had made an appearance alongside UFC featherweight Hatsu Hioki during the Q&A session for UFC on Fuel TV 8. During the Q&A, Akiyama stated he was thinking about returning for another bout as long as he has a free schedule as well as being matched against a well-known opponent that would interest fans. Akiyama also stated he still has interest in fighting Wanderlei Silva, a bout scheduled for UFC 116 but was changed when Silva had to pull out of the fight due to injury.

After over two and a half years away from the sport, Akiyama returned from his self-imposed hiatus on September 20, 2014, at UFC Fight Night 52. He was originally scheduled to face Kyle Noke on the card. However, Noke was forced out of the bout with a knee injury and replaced by Amir Sadollah. Akiyama won the fight via unanimous decision.

After another year away from the sport, Akiyama returned to face Alberto Mina on November 28, 2015, at UFC Fight Night 79. He lost the back-and-forth fight via split decision.

=== ONE Championship ===
After three years from his previous bout, Akiyama announced his contract with ONE Championship. Akiyama faced Agilan Thani in a co-headliner bout at ONE Championship: Legendary Quest on June 20, 2019. He lost the bout via unanimous decision.

Akiyama faced Sherif Mohamed at ONE Championship 109: King of the Jungle on February 28, 2020. Akiyama won the fight via knockout in the first round, his first stoppage via strikes in nearly 13 years.

Akiyama was initially scheduled to face Mohammad Karaki at ONE on TNT 3 on April 21, 2021. However, the bout was cancelled and Akiyama was supposed to face Eduard Folayang at ONE on TNT 4 on April 28, 2021. But due to suffering an injury during training camp, Akiyama pulled out of the fight and the bout was subsequently scrapped.

A 46-year-old Akiyama faced Shinya Aoki at ONE: X on March 26, 2022. After getting dominated for most of the first round, nearly getting submitted, Akiyama went on to win by technical knockout in the second round. Akiyama announced that he plans to fight till he is 50.

Akiyama faced Nieky Holzken in a special-rules match at ONE 165 on January 28, 2024. The first round was under boxing rules, the second was contested a Muay Thai, and the third round was contested a MMA rules. He lost the fight via technical knockout in the first round.

=== Black Combat ===
On May 2, 2026, Akiyama revealed that he has been signed with Korean MMA promotion Black Combat. He will headlining Black Combat 17: VANTABLACK in a retirement rematch bout against Chris Leben.

== Fighting style ==
As a former gold medalist in the sport, Akiyama stands out in MMA for his style of judo. His usage of it is mainly defensive, as he rarely indulges in the art's signature throws. Instead, Akiyama focuses mostly on defending takedowns in order to brawl with his opponent or getting top position on the mat to perform ground and pound. However, he has shown skill with harai goshi, kosoto gake and ouchi gari/osoto gari combinations, as well as the more complex uchi mata. Also, thanks to his knowledge of grip fighting, he is often successful in catching low kicks and following with sharp counterpunching.

== Personal life ==
Akiyama's great-grandfather, Choo Jeong-won, was born in South Jeolla's Cheju County during the Korean Empire era, in what is now Jeju City. During the Japanese occupation of Korea, Choo and his family sailed to Japan and adopted Japanese names to help settle in. He received his Japanese citizenship in 2001.

In March 2009, Akiyama married famous Japanese fashion model Shiho Yano (also known as SHIHO in Japan) whom he had been dating since January 2007. The couple have a daughter, who was born on October 24, 2011. Akiyama and Sarang starred in the reality show, The Return of Superman, covering their father-daughter relationship.

He names heavyweight champion boxer Mike Tyson as his hero and holds a university degree in commerce. He is close friends with South Korean actor Jang Keun-suk. In September 2015, Akiyama also appeared as a guest on 2 Days & 1 Night.

Under the name Choo Sung-hoon, Akiyama appeared in Physical: 100.

== Championships and accomplishments ==
- HERO'S
  - K-1 HERO Light Heavyweight Grand Prix World Champion
- Ultimate Fighting Championship
  - Fight of the Night (Three times) vs. Michael Bisping, Chris Leben and Alan Belcher
  - UFC.com Awards
    - 2009: Half-Year Awards: Best Newcomer of the 1HY, Ranked #10 Newcomer of the Year (Tied with Kimbo Slice & Todd Duffee) & Ranked #6 Fight of the Year vs. Alan Belcher
    - 2010: Ranked #2 Fight of the Year & Half-Year Awards: Best Fight of the 1HY vs. Chris Leben
- ONE Championship
  - Performance of the Night (One time) vs. Shinya Aoki
- Cagewriters
  - 2010 Fight of the Year vs. Chris Leben at UFC 116

== Mixed martial arts record ==
Professional record breakdown
26 matches	16 wins	8 losses
By knockout	7	2
By submission	7	1
By decision	2	5
No contests	2	

Res.	Record	Opponent	Method	Event	Date	Round	Time	Location	Notes
Loss	16–8 (2)	Chris Leben	Decision (split)	Black Combat 17	November 21, 2026	3	5:00	Seoul, South Korea	Catchweight (196 lb.) bout.
Win	16–7 (2)	Shinya Aoki	TKO (punches)	ONE: X	March 26, 2022	2	1:50	Kallang, Singapore	Welterweight bout. Performance of the Night.
Win	15–7 (2)	Sherif Mohamed	KO (punch)	ONE: King of the Jungle	February 28, 2020	1	3:04	Kallang, Singapore	
Loss	14–7 (2)	Agilan Thani	Decision (unanimous)	ONE: Legendary Quest	June 15, 2019	3	5:00	Shanghai, China	Return to Middleweight.
Loss	14–6 (2)	Alberto Mina	Decision (split)	UFC Fight Night: Henderson vs. Masvidal	November 28, 2015	3	5:00	Seoul, South Korea	
Win	14–5 (2)	Amir Sadollah	Decision (unanimous)	UFC Fight Night: Hunt vs. Nelson	September 20, 2014	3	5:00	Saitama, Japan	
Loss	13–5 (2)	Jake Shields	Decision (unanimous)	UFC 144	February 26, 2012	3	5:00	Saitama, Japan	Welterweight debut.
Loss	13–4 (2)	Vitor Belfort	KO (punches)	UFC 133	August 6, 2011	1	1:52	Philadelphia, Pennsylvania, United States	
Loss	13–3 (2)	Michael Bisping	Decision (unanimous)	UFC 120	October 16, 2010	3	5:00	London, England	Fight of the Night.
Loss	13–2 (2)	Chris Leben	Submission (triangle choke)	UFC 116	July 3, 2010	3	4:40	Las Vegas, Nevada, United States	Fight of the Night.
Win	13–1 (2)	Alan Belcher	Decision (split)	UFC 100	July 11, 2009	3	5:00	Las Vegas, Nevada, United States	Fight of the Night.
Win	12–1 (2)	Masanori Tonooka	Submission (armbar)	Dream 6	September 23, 2008	1	6:26	Saitama, Japan	
Win	11–1 (2)	Katsuyori Shibata	Technical Submission (Ezekiel choke)	Dream 5	July 21, 2008	1	6:34	Osaka, Japan	
NC	10–1 (2)	Kazuo Misaki	NC (illegal soccer kick)	Yarennoka!	December 31, 2007	1	7:48	Saitama, Japan	Originally a KO (soccer kick) win for Misaki; overturned after a soccer kick was ruled illegal.
Win	10–1 (1)	Denis Kang	KO (punch)	Hero's 2007 in Korea	October 28, 2007	1	4:45	Seoul, South Korea	
NC	9–1 (1)	Kazushi Sakuraba	NC (overturned)	K-1 Premium 2006 Dynamite!!	December 31, 2006	1	5:37	Osaka, Japan	Return to Middleweight. Originally a TKO (punches) win for Akiyama; overturned after he found to have applied lotion to his body.
Win	9–1	Melvin Manhoef	Submission (armbar)	Hero's 7	October 9, 2006	1	1:58	Yokohama, Japan	Won the 2006 Hero's Light Heavyweight Grand Prix.
Win	8–1	Kestutis Smirnovas	TKO (head kick and punches)	Hero's 7	October 9, 2006	1	3:01	Yokohama, Japan	2006 Hero's Light Heavyweight Grand Prix Semifinal.
Win	7–1	Taiei Kin	Technical Submission (armbar)	Hero's 6	August 5, 2006	1	2:01	Tokyo, Japan	2006 Hero's Light Heavyweight Grand Prix Quarterfinal.
Win	6–1	Katsuhiko Nagata	KO (spinning back kick)	Hero's 5	May 3, 2006	1	2:25	Tokyo, Japan	
Win	5–1	Tokimitsu Ishizawa	Submission (Ezekiel choke)	Hero's 4	March 15, 2006	2	1:41	Tokyo, Japan	Light Heavyweight debut.
Win	4–1	Masakatsu Okuda	KO (slam and punches)	Hero's 2005 in Seoul	November 5, 2005	1	3:31	Seoul, South Korea	
Win	3–1	Michael Lerma	TKO (punches)	K-1 World MAX: Champions Challenge 2005	October 12, 2005	1	2:47	Tokyo, Japan	Middleweight debut.
Win	2–1	Carl Toomey	Submission (armbar)	Hero's 2	July 6, 2005	1	0:59	Tokyo, Japan	
Loss	1–1	Jérôme Le Banner	KO (knees)	Hero's 1	March 26, 2005	1	2:24	Saitama, Japan	
Win	1–0	Francois Botha	Submission (armbar)	K-1 Premium 2004 Dynamite!!	December 31, 2004	1	1:54	Osaka, Japan	Heavyweight debut.

== Special rules record ==
Professional record breakdown
1 match	0 wins	1 loss
By knockout	0	1

Res.	Record	Opponent	Method	Event	Date	Round	Time	Location	Notes
Loss	0–1	Nieky Holzken	TKO (punches)	ONE 165	January 28, 2024	1	1:40	Tokyo, Japan	Catchweight (187.25 lb) bout. Three-minute round alternating between Boxing, Muay Thai and MMA rules.

== Judo competition record ==
Notable Accomplishments/Titles (judo)
All-Japan Collegiate Separate Weight Divisions 2nd Place 2004
All-Japan Industry Judo Singles 81 kg Champion 2001
Kodokan Cup Japan Judo Championship 81 kg Champion 2001
Japan International Judo Tournament 81 kg Champion 2002
Paris International Judo Tournament 81 kg Champion 2002
Asian Games Judo 81 kg Champion 2002 (in Busan)
All-Japan Invitational Judo Championship Separate Weight Divisions 81 kg Champion 2003
World Judo Championship 81 kg Japan Representative 2003

== Filmography ==
=== Film ===
Year	Title	Role	Ref.
2023	Marrying the Mafia	Yappari	

=== Television show ===
Year	Title	Role	Notes	Ref.
2013–2017	The Return of Superman	Cast Member	with Choo Sarang	
2022	Now, Follow Me	Cast Member	with Choo Sarang	
2022	The First Business in the World	Contestant		
2022–2023	Fighter	Mentor		
2025	Handsome Trot	Contestant		
2025	Muscle Farmers	Cast member		
2026	The Secret Friends Club	Cast member		

=== Web shows ===
Year	Title	Role	Ref.
2023	Physical: 100	Contestant	
2025	Try? Choo-ry!		

== See also ==
- List of current ONE fighters
- List of male mixed martial artists
