= Sherali Bozorov =

Tajikistani judoka

Personal information
- Nationality: Tajikistan
- Born: 23 October 1981 (age 44) Kulob, Khatlon, Tajik SSR, Soviet Union
- Height: 1.80 m (5 ft 11 in)
- Weight: 81 kg (179 lb)

Sport
- Sport: Judo
- Event: 81 kg
Medal record
Men's judo
Representing Tajikistan
Asian Championships
Silver medal – second place	2007 Kuwait City	81 kg

Sherali Bozorov (Tajik: Шерали Бозоров; born 23 October 1981 in Kulob, Khatlon) is a Tajikistani judoka, who played for the half-middleweight category. He won a silver medal for his division at the 2007 Asian Judo Championships in Kuwait City, Kuwait, losing out to South Korea's Kwong Young-Woo.

Bozorov represented Tajikistan at the 2008 Summer Olympics in Beijing, where he competed for the men's half-middleweight class (81 kg). He lost the first preliminary round match, by a yuko and a non-combativity technique (P29), to Togo's Kouami Sacha Denanyoh.
