= Aljaž Sedej =

Slovenian judoka (born 1988)

Personal information
- Born: 30 May 1988 (age 38) Ljubljana, Slovenia
- Occupation: Judoka

Sport
- Country: Slovenia
- Sport: Judo
- Weight class: ‍–‍81 kg

Achievements and titles
- Olympic Games: R32 (2008, 2012)
- World Champ.: R16 (2009)
- European Champ.: (bronze) (2009)
Medal record
Men's judo
Representing Slovenia
European Championships
Bronze medal – third place	2009 Tbilisi	‍–‍81 kg
IJF Grand Prix
Silver medal – second place	2010 Abu Dhabi	‍–‍81 kg
Silver medal – second place	2011 Amsterdam	‍–‍81 kg
European U23 Championships
Gold medal – first place	2007 Salzburg	‍–‍81 kg
Bronze medal – third place	2009 Antalya	‍–‍81 kg
European Junior Championships
Gold medal – first place	2007 Prague	‍–‍81 kg
Bronze medal – third place	2006 Tallinn	‍–‍81 kg
Mediterranean Games
Gold medal – first place	2009 Pescara	‍–‍81 kg
Silver medal – second place	2013 Mersin	‍–‍81 kg

Profile at external databases
- IJF: 264
- JudoInside.com: 33384
- Updated on 16 November 2022

Aljaž Sedej (born 30 May 1988) is a Slovenian judoka. He competed in the men's 81 kg event at the 2008 and 2012 Summer Olympics. At the 2008 Summer Olympics, he was defeated in the second round by Hamed Malekmohammadi. At the 2012 Olympics he was eliminated in the second round by Travis Stevens.
