= 2000 World Judo Juniors Championships =

Judo competition

Judo 2000 World Judo Juniors Championships
- Venue: Nabeul
- Location: Nabeul, Tunisia
- Dates: 26–29 October 2000

Competition at external databases
- Links: JudoInside

The 2000 World Judo Juniors Championships was an edition of the World Judo Juniors Championships, organised by the International Judo Federation. It was held in Nabeul, Tunisia from 26 to 29 October 2000.

== Medal summary ==
=== Men's events ===
Event	Gold	Silver	Bronze
Extra-lightweight (−60 kg)	João Derly (BRA)	Ludwig Paischer (AUT)	Kim Kwang-sub (KOR)
Extra-lightweight (−60 kg)	João Derly (BRA)	Ludwig Paischer (AUT)	Javier Fernández (ESP)
Half-lightweight (−66 kg)	Renat Mirzaliyev (UKR)	Arash Miresmaeili (IRI)	Tomasz Adamiec (POL)
Half-lightweight (−66 kg)	Renat Mirzaliyev (UKR)	Arash Miresmaeili (IRI)	Moacir Mendes (BRA)
Lightweight (−73 kg)	Masahiro Takamatsu (JPN)	Ruslan Lushnikov (UKR)	Daniel Mallaun (AUT)
Lightweight (−73 kg)	Masahiro Takamatsu (JPN)	Ruslan Lushnikov (UKR)	Dzhamlet Abuladze (RUS)
Half-middleweight (−81 kg)	Grigol Mamrikishvili (GEO)	Roberto Meloni (ITA)	Maratbek Myktybekov (KAZ)
Half-middleweight (−81 kg)	Grigol Mamrikishvili (GEO)	Roberto Meloni (ITA)	Kwon Young-woo (KOR)
Middleweight (−90 kg)	Zurab Zviadauri (GEO)	Peter Cousins (GBR)	Dániel Hadfi (HUN)
Middleweight (−90 kg)	Zurab Zviadauri (GEO)	Peter Cousins (GBR)	Alessandro Merly (BRA)
Half-heavyweight (−100 kg)	Thomas Pille (GER)	Masanori Hongo (JPN)	Kim Jung-hoon (KOR)
Half-heavyweight (−100 kg)	Thomas Pille (GER)	Masanori Hongo (JPN)	Jean Vanbever (FRA)
Heavyweight (+100 kg)	Gadzhimurad Muslimov (RUS)	Paolo Bianchessi (ITA)	Yohei Takai (JPN)
Heavyweight (+100 kg)	Gadzhimurad Muslimov (RUS)	Paolo Bianchessi (ITA)	László Szilágyi (HUN)

=== Women's events ===
Event	Gold	Silver	Bronze
Extra-lightweight (−48 kg)	Alina Dumitru (ROU)	Sayaka Matsumoto (USA)	Eriko Nakajima (JPN)
Extra-lightweight (−48 kg)	Alina Dumitru (ROU)	Sayaka Matsumoto (USA)	Gao Feng (CHN)
Half-lightweight (−52 kg)	Fabiane Hukuda (BRA)	Audrey La Rizza (FRA)	Aiko Sato (JPN)
Half-lightweight (−52 kg)	Fabiane Hukuda (BRA)	Audrey La Rizza (FRA)	Viktória Nagy (HUN)
Lightweight (−57 kg)	Yurisleidy Lupetey (CUB)	Reiko Yoshinaru (JPN)	Kifayat Gasimova (AZE)
Lightweight (−57 kg)	Yurisleidy Lupetey (CUB)	Reiko Yoshinaru (JPN)	Xu Yuhua (CHN)
Half-middleweight (−63 kg)	Lucie Décosse (FRA)	Ayumi Tanimoto (JPN)	Claudia Heill (AUT)
Half-middleweight (−63 kg)	Lucie Décosse (FRA)	Ayumi Tanimoto (JPN)	Anaysi Hernández (CUB)
Middleweight (−70 kg)	Natalia Kazantseva (RUS)	Sviatlana Tsimashenka (BLR)	Wang Haixia (CHN)
Middleweight (−70 kg)	Natalia Kazantseva (RUS)	Sviatlana Tsimashenka (BLR)	Yoshimi Shichijo (JPN)
Half-heavyweight (−78 kg)	Anastasiia Matrosova (UKR)	Raquel Prieto (ESP)	Éva Bisséni (FRA)
Half-heavyweight (−78 kg)	Anastasiia Matrosova (UKR)	Raquel Prieto (ESP)	Megumi Nagase (JPN)
Heavyweight (+78 kg)	Maki Tsukada (JPN)	Marie Elisabeth Veys (BEL)	Maryna Prokofyeva (UKR)
Heavyweight (+78 kg)	Maki Tsukada (JPN)	Marie Elisabeth Veys (BEL)	Tong Wen (CHN)

Source Results

=== Medal table ===
* Host nation (Tunisia)

Rank	Nation	Gold	Silver	Bronze	Total
1	Japan (JPN)	2	3	5	10
2	Ukraine (UKR)	2	1	1	4
3	Brazil (BRA)	2	0	2	4
4	Russia (RUS)	2	0	1	3
5	Georgia (GEO)	2	0	0	2
6	France (FRA)	1	1	2	4
7	Cuba (CUB)	1	0	1	2
8	Germany (GER)	1	0	0	1
8	Romania (ROU)	1	0	0	1
10	Italy (ITA)	0	2	0	2
11	Austria (AUT)	0	1	2	3
12	Spain (ESP)	0	1	1	2
13	Belarus (BLR)	0	1	0	1
13	Belgium (BEL)	0	1	0	1
13	Great Britain (GBR)	0	1	0	1
13	Iran (IRI)	0	1	0	1
13	United States (USA)	0	1	0	1
18	China (CHN)	0	0	4	4
19	Hungary (HUN)	0	0	3	3
19	South Korea (KOR)	0	0	3	3
21	Azerbaijan (AZE)	0	0	1	1
21	Kazakhstan (KAZ)	0	0	1	1
21	Poland (POL)	0	0	1	1
Totals (23 entries)		14	14	28	56
