= Marcel Aragão =

Brazilian judoka

Personal information
- Born: 24 March 1978 (age 47); Aracajú, Brazil

Sport
- Sport: Judo

Marcel Aragão (born 24 March 1978) is a Brazilian judoka. He competed in the men's half-middleweight event at the 2000 Summer Olympics.
