= Derya Cıbır =

Turkish judoka

Personal information
- Born: 14 July 1990 (age 35)
- Occupation: Judoka

Sport
- Country: Turkey
- Sport: Judo
- Weight class: –48 kg

Achievements and titles
- European Champ.: 7th (2010)
Medal record
Women's judo
Representing Turkey
World Juniors Championships
Silver medal – second place	2008 Bangkok	–48 kg
Bronze medal – third place	2009 Paris	–48 kg
European Junior Championships
Silver medal – second place	2008 Warsaw	–48 kg
Silver medal – second place	2009 Yerevan	–48 kg
European Cadet Championships
Bronze medal – third place	2005 Salzburg	–40 kg
Bronze medal – third place	2006 Miskolc	–44 kg
Mediterranean Games
Bronze medal – third place	2009 Pescara	–48 kg

Profile at external databases
- IJF: 1312
- JudoInside.com: 38780
- Updated on 12 January 2023

Derya Cıbır (born 14 July 1990 in Çorum) is a Turkish judoka competing in the lightweight (48 kg) division.

At the 2008 European Junior Championship, she finished in second place in the lightweight (-48 kg) division. Derya Cıbır won a bronze medal at the 2009 Mediterranean Games in Pescara, Italy.

She currently resides in İzmir.
