= Franklin Cisneros =

Salvadoran judoka (1983–2023)

Personal information
- Full name: Franklin Amadeo Cisneros Duarte
- Born: 21 December 1983 San Salvador, El Salvador
- Died: 28 October 2023 (aged 39) Florida, U.S.
- Height: 1.70 m (5 ft 7 in)
- Weight: 81 kg (179 lb)

Sport
- Sport: Judo
- Event: 81 kg
Medal record
Men's judo
Representing El Salvador
Pan American Games
Bronze medal – third place	2007 Rio de Janeiro	81 kg

Franklin Amadeo Cisneros Duarte (21 December 1983 – 28 October 2023) was a Salvadoran judoka, who played for the half-middleweight category (81 kg). He won a bronze medal for his division at the 2007 Pan American Games in Rio de Janeiro, Brazil.

Cisneros represented El Salvador at the 2008 Summer Olympics in Beijing, where he competed for the men's half-middleweight class. He received a bye for the second preliminary round, before losing out by an ippon and a juji gatame (back-lying perpendicular armbar) to U.S. judoka and Pan American Games champion Travis Stevens.

Cisneros retired in 2010. He later moved to the United States, where he worked as a trainer at the Top Brother Gym in Florada. Cisneros died on 28 October 2023, at the age of 39, of "natural causes".
