= Rauf Hukmatov =

Tajikistani judoka

Rauf Hukmatov (born 2 March 1978) is a Tajikistani judoka.

He came first in the middleweight division at the 2004 Tajikistan Championships in Dushanbe.

He came third in the half-middleweight division at the 2005 Asian Championships in Tashkent in May 2005.

He finished in joint fifth place in the half-middleweight (81 kg) division at the 2006 Asian Games, having lost to Guo Lei of China in the bronze medal match.

He currently resides in Dushanbe.
