= 2007 European Junior Judo Championships =

Judo competition

Judo 2007 European Junior Judo Championships
- Location: Prague, Czech Republic
- Dates: 5–7 October 2007

Competition at external databases
- Links: EJU • JudoInside

The 2007 European Junior Judo Championships is an edition of the European Junior Judo Championships, organised by the International Judo Federation. It was held in Prague, Czech Republic from 5 to 7 October 2007.

== Medal summary ==
=== Medal table ===
* Host nation (Czech Republic)

Rank	Nation	Gold	Silver	Bronze	Total
1	France (FRA)	3	3	2	8
2	Russia (RUS)	3	1	5	9
3	Netherlands (NED)	2	0	2	4
4	Georgia (GEO)	1	2	0	3
5	Germany (GER)	1	1	4	6
6	Poland (POL)	1	1	0	2
7	Israel (ISR)	1	0	0	1
7	Portugal (POR)	1	0	0	1
7	Slovenia (SLO)	1	0	0	1
10	Ukraine (UKR)	0	3	2	5
11	Hungary (HUN)	0	1	2	3
12	Armenia (ARM)	0	1	1	2
13	Belarus (BLR)	0	1	0	1
14	Azerbaijan (AZE)	0	0	2	2
14	Great Britain (GBR)	0	0	2	2
16	Austria (AUT)	0	0	1	1
16	Belgium (BEL)	0	0	1	1
16	Greece (GRE)	0	0	1	1
16	Italy (ITA)	0	0	1	1
16	Latvia (LAT)	0	0	1	1
16	Sweden (SWE)	0	0	1	1
Totals (21 entries)		14	14	28	56

=== Men's events ===
Event	Gold	Silver	Bronze
−60 kg	Arsen Galstyan (RUS)	Anatoliy Laskuta (UKR)	Ashley McKenzie (GBR)
−60 kg	Arsen Galstyan (RUS)	Anatoliy Laskuta (UKR)	Sarkhan Ahmadov (AZE)
−66 kg	Tomasz Kowalski (POL)	Ugo Legrand (FRA)	Michael Mayr (AUT)
−66 kg	Tomasz Kowalski (POL)	Ugo Legrand (FRA)	Musa Mogushkov (RUS)
−73 kg	Mikhail Machin (RUS)	Zviad Bazandarashvili (GEO)	Joachim Bottieau (BEL)
−73 kg	Mikhail Machin (RUS)	Zviad Bazandarashvili (GEO)	Christopher Völk (GER)
−81 kg	Aljaž Sedej (SLO)	Alibek Bashkaev (RUS)	Ramin Gurbanov (AZE)
−81 kg	Aljaž Sedej (SLO)	Alibek Bashkaev (RUS)	Artem Vasylenko (UKR)
−90 kg	Varlam Liparteliani (GEO)	Dino Pfeiffer (GER)	Hakob Arakelyan (ARM)
−90 kg	Varlam Liparteliani (GEO)	Dino Pfeiffer (GER)	Theodoros Masmanidis (GRE)
−100 kg	Denis Herbst (GER)	Razmik Tonoyan (UKR)	Yann Azrou (FRA)
−100 kg	Denis Herbst (GER)	Razmik Tonoyan (UKR)	Vladimirs Osnačs (LAT)
+100 kg	Jeffrey van Emden (NED)	Levan Mukeria (GEO)	Christoffer Johansson (SWE)
+100 kg	Jeffrey van Emden (NED)	Levan Mukeria (GEO)	Magomed Nazhmudinov (RUS)

=== Women's events ===
Event	Gold	Silver	Bronze
−48 kg	Leandra Freitas (POR)	Ewa Konieczny (POL)	Kay Kraus (GER)
−48 kg	Leandra Freitas (POR)	Ewa Konieczny (POL)	Barbara Maros (HUN)
−52 kg	Natalia Kuziutina (RUS)	Anush Hakobyan (ARM)	Pénélope Bonna (FRA)
−52 kg	Natalia Kuziutina (RUS)	Anush Hakobyan (ARM)	Maureen Groefsema (NED)
−57 kg	Automne Pavia (FRA)	Hedvig Karakas (HUN)	Hannah Brueck (GER)
−57 kg	Automne Pavia (FRA)	Hedvig Karakas (HUN)	Alessia Regis (ITA)
−63 kg	Alice Schlesinger (ISR)	Valériane Fichot (FRA)	Antoinette Hennink (NED)
−63 kg	Alice Schlesinger (ISR)	Valériane Fichot (FRA)	Abigél Joó (HUN)
−70 kg	Linda Bolder (NED)	Clarisse Habricot (FRA)	Barbara Bandel (GER)
−70 kg	Linda Bolder (NED)	Clarisse Habricot (FRA)	Margarita Gurtsieva (RUS)
−78 kg	Malika Michel (FRA)	Hanna Radzevich (BLR)	Viktoriya Denysenko (UKR)
−78 kg	Malika Michel (FRA)	Hanna Radzevich (BLR)	Elena Grabova (RUS)
+78 kg	Kayra Sayit (FRA)	Svitlana Iaromka (UKR)	Polina Belousova (RUS)
+78 kg	Kayra Sayit (FRA)	Svitlana Iaromka (UKR)	Ashley Fleming (GBR)

Source Results
