= Chen Chun-ching =

Taiwanese judoka

Personal information
- Nationality: Taiwanese
- Born: 13 November 1975 (age 50)

Sport
- Sport: Judo

Chen Chun-ching (born 13 November 1975) is a Taiwanese judoka. He competed in the men's half-middleweight event at the 2000 Summer Olympics.
