= 2008 World Judo Juniors Championships =

Judo competition

Judo 2008 World Judo Juniors Championships
- Location: Bangkok, Thailand
- Dates: 23–26 October 2008

Competition at external databases
- Links: EJU • JudoInside

The 2008 World Judo Juniors Championships was an edition of the World Judo Juniors Championships, organised by the International Judo Federation. It was held in Bangkok, Thailand from 23 to 26 October 2008.

== Medal summary ==
=== Men's events ===
Event	Gold	Silver	Bronze
Extra-lightweight (−60 kg)	Arsen Galstyan (RUS)	Davaadorjiin Tömörkhüleg (MGL)	Gabit Esimbetov (UZB)
Extra-lightweight (−60 kg)	Arsen Galstyan (RUS)	Davaadorjiin Tömörkhüleg (MGL)	Hirofumi Yamamoto (JPN)
Half-lightweight (−66 kg)	Ugo Legrand (FRA)	Zsolt Gorjánácz (HUN)	Masashi Ebinuma (JPN)
Half-lightweight (−66 kg)	Ugo Legrand (FRA)	Zsolt Gorjánácz (HUN)	Sarkhan Ahmadov (AZE)
Lightweight (−73 kg)	Kim Won-jung (KOR)	Benji Nortan (NED)	Riki Nakaya (JPN)
Lightweight (−73 kg)	Kim Won-jung (KOR)	Benji Nortan (NED)	Victor Penalber (BRA)
Half-middleweight (−81 kg)	Alibek Bashkaev (RUS)	Artem Vasylenko (UKR)	Yasuhiro Ebi (JPN)
Half-middleweight (−81 kg)	Alibek Bashkaev (RUS)	Artem Vasylenko (UKR)	Ramin Gurbanov (AZE)
Middleweight (−90 kg)	Varlam Liparteliani (GEO)	Marvin De la Croes (NED)	Marcus Nyman (SWE)
Middleweight (−90 kg)	Varlam Liparteliani (GEO)	Marvin De la Croes (NED)	Luke Taylor (GBR)
Half-heavyweight (−100 kg)	Lukáš Krpálek (CZE)	Marvin Huisman (NED)	Battulgyn Temüülen (MGL)
Half-heavyweight (−100 kg)	Lukáš Krpálek (CZE)	Marvin Huisman (NED)	Anton Martsulevich (BLR)
Heavyweight (+100 kg)	Teddy Riner (FRA)	Masaru Momose (JPN)	Magomed Nazhmudinov (RUS)
Heavyweight (+100 kg)	Teddy Riner (FRA)	Masaru Momose (JPN)	Wang Hao (CHN)

=== Women's events ===
Event	Gold	Silver	Bronze
Extra-lightweight (−48 kg)	Sarah Menezes (BRA)	Derya Cıbır (TUR)	Yumi Asaka (JPN)
Extra-lightweight (−48 kg)	Sarah Menezes (BRA)	Derya Cıbır (TUR)	Glynis Rojot (NED)
Half-lightweight (−52 kg)	Chiho Kagaya (JPN)	Shahar Levy (ISR)	Barbara Maros (HUN)
Half-lightweight (−52 kg)	Chiho Kagaya (JPN)	Shahar Levy (ISR)	Susi Zimmermann (GER)
Lightweight (−57 kg)	Rafaela Silva (BRA)	Automne Pavia (FRA)	Gemma Howell (GBR)
Lightweight (−57 kg)	Rafaela Silva (BRA)	Automne Pavia (FRA)	Tina Trstenjak (SLO)
Half-middleweight (−63 kg)	Yuki Kikukawa (JPN)	Antoinette Hennink (NED)	Eszter Gáspár (HUN)
Half-middleweight (−63 kg)	Yuki Kikukawa (JPN)	Antoinette Hennink (NED)	Camila Minakawa (BRA)
Middleweight (−70 kg)	Haruka Tachimoto (JPN)	Mayra Aguiar (BRA)	Abigél Joó (HUN)
Middleweight (−70 kg)	Haruka Tachimoto (JPN)	Mayra Aguiar (BRA)	Irina Sordiya (RUS)
Half-heavyweight (−78 kg)	Kayla Harrison (USA)	Audrey Tcheuméo (FRA)	Nadia Campestrin (SUI)
Half-heavyweight (−78 kg)	Kayla Harrison (USA)	Audrey Tcheuméo (FRA)	Ruika Sato (JPN)
Heavyweight (+78 kg)	Megumi Tachimoto (JPN)	Ashley Fleming (GBR)	Svitlana Iaromka (UKR)
Heavyweight (+78 kg)	Megumi Tachimoto (JPN)	Ashley Fleming (GBR)	Kim Ji-youn (KOR)

Source Results

=== Medal table ===
* Host nation (Thailand)

Rank	Nation	Gold	Silver	Bronze	Total
1	Japan (JPN)	4	1	6	11
2	France (FRA)	2	2	0	4
3	Brazil (BRA)	2	1	2	5
4	Russia (RUS)	2	0	2	4
5	South Korea (KOR)	1	0	1	2
6	Czech Republic (CZE)	1	0	0	1
6	Georgia (GEO)	1	0	0	1
6	United States (USA)	1	0	0	1
9	Netherlands (NED)	0	4	1	5
10	Hungary (HUN)	0	1	3	4
11	Great Britain (GBR)	0	1	2	3
12	Mongolia (MGL)	0	1	1	2
12	Ukraine (UKR)	0	1	1	2
14	Israel (ISR)	0	1	0	1
14	Turkey (TUR)	0	1	0	1
16	Azerbaijan (AZE)	0	0	2	2
17	Belarus (BLR)	0	0	1	1
17	China (CHN)	0	0	1	1
17	Germany (GER)	0	0	1	1
17	Slovenia (SLO)	0	0	1	1
17	Sweden (SWE)	0	0	1	1
17	Switzerland (SUI)	0	0	1	1
17	Uzbekistan (UZB)	0	0	1	1
Totals (23 entries)		14	14	28	56
