= Alibek Bashkaev =

Russian judoka

Personal information
- Full name: Alibek Alikovich Bashkayev
- Born: 16 November 1989 (age 36) Semikarakorsk, Rostov Oblast, Russian SFSR
- Occupation: Judoka
- Height: 1.80 m (5 ft 11 in)

Sport
- Country: Russia
- Sport: Judo
- Weight class: ‍–‍81 kg

Achievements and titles
- Olympic Games: R32 (2008)
- European Champ.: 9th (2008)
Medal record
Men's judo
Representing Russia
World Juniors Championships
Gold medal – first place	2006 Santo Domingo	‍–‍81 kg
Gold medal – first place	2008 Bangkok	‍–‍81 kg
European Junior Championships
Silver medal – second place	2007 Prague	‍–‍81 kg
European Cadet Championships
Bronze medal – third place	2005 Salzburg	‍–‍81 kg

Profile at external databases
- IJF: 38541
- JudoInside.com: 38742
- Updated on 11 February 2022

Alibek Alikovich Bashkayev (also Alibek Bashkaev, Russian: Алибек Аликович Башкаев; born November 16, 1989) is a Russian judoka, who played for the half-middleweight category. He won two gold medals for his division at the 2006 World Judo Juniors Championships in Santo Domingo, Dominican Republic, and at the 2008 World Judo Juniors Championships in Bangkok, Thailand.

Bashkaev represented Russia at the 2008 Summer Olympics in Beijing, where he competed for the men's half-middleweight class (81 kg). He received a bye for the second preliminary round, before losing out by an ippon and a sumi gaeshi (corner reversal) to Morocco's Safouane Attaf.
