= Abderramán Brenes =

Puerto Rican judoka

Personal information
- Full name: Abderramán Brenes la Roche
- Nationality: Puerto Rico
- Born: 22 October 1978 (age 47) Rio Piedras, Puerto Rico
- Height: 1.80 m (5 ft 11 in)
- Weight: 81 kg (179 lb)

Sport
- Sport: Judo
- Event: 81 kg

Abderramán Brenes la Roche (born October 22, 1978) is a Puerto Rican judoka, who played for the half-middleweight category. Brenes represented Puerto Rico at the 2008 Summer Olympics in Beijing, where he competed for the men's half-middleweight class (81 kg). He received a bye for the second preliminary round, before losing out by two yuko and a morote gari (double leg takedown) to Italy's Giuseppe Maddaloni.
