= 2005 European Cadet Judo Championships =

Judo competition

Judo 2005 European Cadet Judo Championships
- Location: Salzburg, Austria
- Dates: 18–19 June 2005

Competition at external databases
- Links: JudoInside

The 2005 European Cadet Judo Championships is an edition of the European Cadet Judo Championships, organised by the International Judo Federation. It was held in Salzburg, Austria from 18 to 19 June 2005.

== Medal summary ==
=== Medal table ===
* Host nation (Austria)

Rank	Nation	Gold	Silver	Bronze	Total
1	Russia (RUS)	4	4	4	12
2	Great Britain (GBR)	2	0	3	5
3	Ukraine (UKR)	2	0	2	4
4	Hungary (HUN)	2	0	1	3
4	Israel (ISR)	2	0	1	3
6	Netherlands (NED)	1	2	1	4
7	Italy (ITA)	1	2	0	3
8	Azerbaijan (AZE)	1	1	1	3
9	Slovenia (SLO)	1	0	2	3
10	Germany (GER)	0	2	2	4
11	Poland (POL)	0	1	3	4
12	Georgia (GEO)	0	1	2	3
13	Czech Republic (CZE)	0	1	1	2
13	Romania (ROU)	0	1	1	2
15	Spain (ESP)	0	1	0	1
16	France (FRA)	0	0	5	5
17	Estonia (EST)	0	0	1	1
17	Switzerland (SUI)	0	0	1	1
17	Turkey (TUR)	0	0	1	1
Totals (19 entries)		16	16	32	64

=== Men's events ===
Event	Gold	Silver	Bronze
−50 kg	Samir Dadashzade (AZE)	Andrey Bazhitov (RUS)	Ashley McKenzie (GBR)
−50 kg	Samir Dadashzade (AZE)	Andrey Bazhitov (RUS)	Mateusz Gruszczynski (POL)
−55 kg	Andrii Burdun (UKR)	Borja Fernández (ESP)	Robert Mshvidobadze (GEO)
−55 kg	Andrii Burdun (UKR)	Borja Fernández (ESP)	Dmitry Saprykin (RUS)
−60 kg	Arsen Galstyan (RUS)	Zaur Bagirli (AZE)	Eric Dufond (FRA)
−60 kg	Arsen Galstyan (RUS)	Zaur Bagirli (AZE)	Fabian Munteanu (ROU)
−66 kg	Jean-Rene Badrick (GBR)	Arsen Macharashvili (GEO)	Mikhail Machin (RUS)
−66 kg	Jean-Rene Badrick (GBR)	Arsen Macharashvili (GEO)	Ugo Legrand (FRA)
−73 kg	Zaur Salikhov (RUS)	Giovanni Carollo (ITA)	Asaf Aliyev (AZE)
−73 kg	Zaur Salikhov (RUS)	Giovanni Carollo (ITA)	Georgi Ladogin (EST)
−81 kg	Marvin De la Croes (NED)	Tomasz Domanski (POL)	Alibek Bashkaev (RUS)
−81 kg	Marvin De la Croes (NED)	Tomasz Domanski (POL)	Aviv Hatzir (ISR)
−90 kg	Adám Juhász (HUN)	Ibrakhim Khamkhoev (RUS)	Konstantin Mukvani (GEO)
−90 kg	Adám Juhász (HUN)	Ibrakhim Khamkhoev (RUS)	Michal Krpálek (CZE)
+90 kg	David Mamistvalov (ISR)	Lorenzo Romano (ITA)	Mykhaylo Blinov (UKR)
+90 kg	David Mamistvalov (ISR)	Lorenzo Romano (ITA)	Denis Herbst (GER)

=== Women's events ===
Event	Gold	Silver	Bronze
−40 kg	Yuliya Komarova (UKR)	Violeta Dumitru (ROU)	Juliette Staedler (SUI)
−40 kg	Yuliya Komarova (UKR)	Violeta Dumitru (ROU)	Derya Cıbır (TUR)
−44 kg	Shahar Levy (ISR)	Nikki Pluymaekers (NED)	Toni Prince (GBR)
−44 kg	Shahar Levy (ISR)	Nikki Pluymaekers (NED)	Yulia Korchagina (RUS)
−48 kg	Natalia Kuziutina (RUS)	Hannah Brueck (GER)	Laure Beauchet (FRA)
−48 kg	Natalia Kuziutina (RUS)	Hannah Brueck (GER)	Glynis Rojot (NED)
−52 kg	Hedvig Karakas (HUN)	Yulia Kazarina (RUS)	Lisa Elm (GER)
−52 kg	Hedvig Karakas (HUN)	Yulia Kazarina (RUS)	Tajda Ketis (SLO)
−57 kg	Alessia Regis (ITA)	Juul Franssen (NED)	Megan Fletcher (GBR)
−57 kg	Alessia Regis (ITA)	Juul Franssen (NED)	Dóra Hegedus (HUN)
−63 kg	Narine Zaimtsyan (RUS)	Luisa Beckmann (GER)	Maya Thoyer (FRA)
−63 kg	Narine Zaimtsyan (RUS)	Luisa Beckmann (GER)	Marina Bugayeva (UKR)
−70 kg	Lea Murko (SLO)	Ekaterina Denisenkova (RUS)	Daria Pogorzelec (POL)
−70 kg	Lea Murko (SLO)	Ekaterina Denisenkova (RUS)	Emmanuelle Nobili (FRA)
+70 kg	Laura Haynes (GBR)	Adriana Valcova (CZE)	Barbara Ban (SLO)
+70 kg	Laura Haynes (GBR)	Adriana Valcova (CZE)	Violeta Nasiadko (POL)

Source Results
