= José Figueroa (judoka) =

Puerto Rican judoka

Personal information
- Nationality: Puerto Rican
- Born: 21 October 1970 (age 55)

Sport
- Sport: Judo

José Figueroa (born 21 October 1970) is a Puerto Rican judoka. He competed at the 1996 Summer Olympics and the 2000 Summer Olympics.
