= Damdinsürengiin Nyamkhüü =

Mongolian judoka (born 1979)

Personal information
- Born: September 25, 1979 (age 47) Ulaanbaatar, Mongolia
Medal record
Men's judo
Representing Mongolia
Asian Games
Gold medal – first place	2006 Doha	81 kg
Bronze medal – third place	2002 Busan	81 kg
Asian Championships
Gold medal – first place	2003 Jeju City	-81 kg
Silver medal – second place	2001 Ulaanbaatar	-81 kg

Damdinsürengiin Nyamkhüü (Mongolian: Дамдинсүрэнгийн Нямхүү; born September 25, 1979, in Ulaanbaatar) is a Mongolian judoka.

== Career ==
Participating at the 2004 Olympics, he was stopped in the round of 32 by Gabriel Arteaga of Cuba.

He won the gold medal in the half-middleweight (81 kg) category of the 2006 Asian Games, having defeated Almas Atayev of Kazakhstan in the final match.

He currently resides in Ulaanbaatar.
