= Aleksei Budõlin =

Estonian judoka (born 1976)

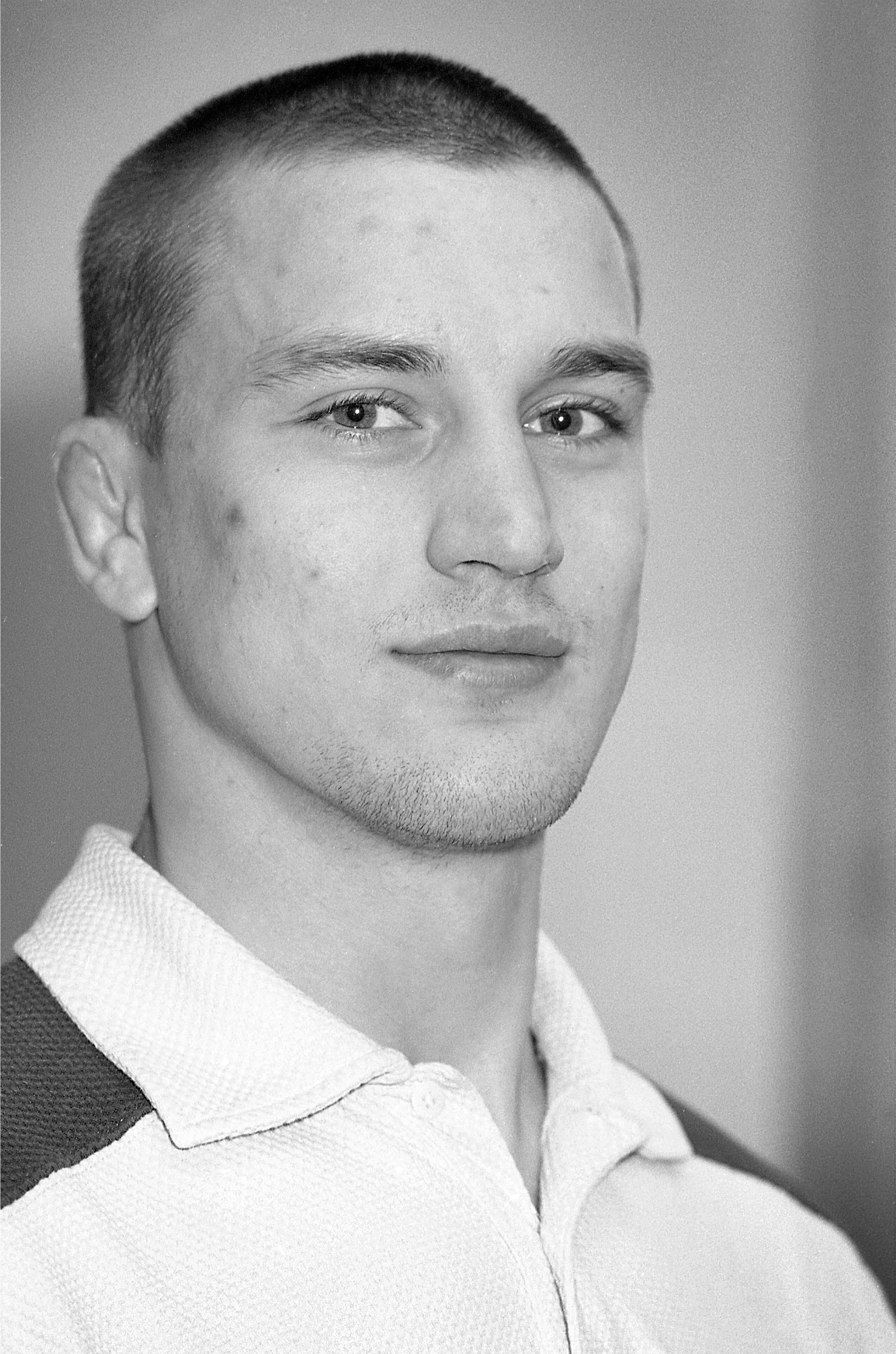
- Aleksei Budõlin (1999)

Personal information
- Born: 5 April 1976 (age 50) Tallinn, then part of Estonian SSR, Soviet Union
- Occupation: Judoka

Sport
- Country: Estonia
- Sport: Judo
- Weight class: ‍–‍73 kg, ‍–‍81 kg
- Now coaching: Uzbekistan national judo team

Achievements and titles
- Olympic Games: (bronze) (2000)
- World Champ.: (silver) (2001)
- European Champ.: (gold) (2001)
Medal record
Men's judo
Representing Estonia
Olympic Games
Bronze medal – third place	2000 Sydney	‍–‍81 kg
World Championships
Silver medal – second place	2001 Munich	‍–‍81 kg
Bronze medal – third place	2003 Osaka	‍–‍81 kg
European Championships
Gold medal – first place	2001 Paris	‍–‍81 kg
Silver medal – second place	1999 Bratislava	‍–‍73 kg
Silver medal – second place	2002 Maribor	‍–‍81 kg
Bronze medal – third place	2000 Wrocław	‍–‍81 kg
Bronze medal – third place	2003 Düsseldorf	‍–‍81 kg
European Junior Championships
Gold medal – first place	1995 Valladolid	‍–‍78 kg
Gold medal – first place	1996 Monte Carlo	‍–‍78 kg

Profile at external databases
- IJF: 36686
- JudoInside.com: 331
- Updated on 31 May 2023

Aleksei Budõlin (born 5 April 1976) is an Estonian former judoka and current coach. At the 2000 Summer Olympics he won a bronze medal in the men's Half Middleweight (‍–‍81 kg) category, together with Nuno Delgado of Portugal.
