= Ariel Sganga =

Argentinian Olympic judoka

Personal information
- Born: February 25, 1974 (age 52) Buenos Aires, Argentina
Medal record
Men's Judo
Representing Argentina
Pan American Games
Bronze medal – third place	2003 S Domingo	Half Middleweight
South American Games
Bronze medal – third place	2002 Rio de Janeiro	Half Middleweight

Ariel Sganga (born February 25, 1974) is an Argentinian male judoka, who won the bronze medal in the men's half middleweight division (– 81 kg) at the 2003 Pan American Games in Santo Domingo, Dominican Republic. He represented his native country at the 2004 Summer Olympics in Athens, Greece.

Ariel Scanga -90 kg (ages 35–39) from Argentina took GOLD at the 4th IJF Grand Masters World Judo Championships in Miami.
