= Erkin Ibragimov =

Kyrgyz judoka (born 1980)

Erkin Mukhtarovich Ibragimov
Personal information
- Nationality: Kyrgyz
- Born: 24 May 1980 (age 46) Bishkek, Kirghiz SSR, Soviet Union
- Height: 1.78 m (5 ft 10 in)
- Weight: 81 kg (179 lb)

Sport
- Sport: Judo
- Event: 81 kg

Erkin Mukhtarovich Ibragimov (Kyrgyz: Эркин Мухтарович Ибрагимов; born 24 May 1980 in Bishkek, Kirghiz SSR) is a Kyrgyz judoka, who competed in the men's half-middleweight category. He attained a fifth-place finish in the 81-kg division at the 2002 Asian Games in Busan, South Korea, and represented his nation Kyrgyzstan at the 2004 Summer Olympics.

Ibragimov qualified as a lone judoka for the Kyrgyz squad in the men's half-middleweight category at the 2004 Summer Olympics in Athens, by granting a tripartite invitation from the International Judo Federation. Although he managed a koka point in his opening match, Ibragimov could not deliver a powerful maneuver to flip U.S. judoka Rick Hawn, and thereby succumbed to a yuko at the end of the five-minute bout.
