= Roberto Meloni =

Italian judoka

Personal information
- Born: 20 February 1981 (age 45)
- Occupation: Judoka

Sport
- Country: Italy
- Sport: Judo
- Weight class: –81 kg, –90 kg

Achievements and titles
- Olympic Games: R32 (2004)
- World Champ.: (bronze) (2007)
- European Champ.: (silver) (2005)
Medal record
Men's judo
Representing Italy
World Championships
| Bronze medal – third place | 2007 Rio de Janeiro | –90 kg |
European Championships
| Silver medal – second place | 2005 Rotterdam | –90 kg |
| Bronze medal – third place | 2002 Maribor | –81 kg |
| Bronze medal – third place | 2006 Tampere | –90 kg |
| Bronze medal – third place | 2007 Belgrade | –90 kg |
IJF Grand Slam
| Bronze medal – third place | 2011 Moscow | –90 kg |
IJF Grand Prix
| Silver medal – second place | 2010 Abu Dhabi | –90 kg |
World Juniors Championships
| Silver medal – second place | 2000 Nabeul | –81 kg |
European Junior Championships
| Silver medal – second place | 1997 Ljubljana | –78 kg |

Profile at external databases
- IJF: 4164
- JudoInside.com: 449
- Updated on 17 November 2022

Roberto Meloni (born 20 February 1981 in Rome) is an Italian judoka. Height 1.79m, weight 90 kg

== Achievements ==
| Year | Tournament | Place | Weight class |
|---|---|---|---|
| 2008 | European Championships | 5th | Middleweight (90 kg) |
| 2007 | World Judo Championships | 3rd | Middleweight (90 kg) |
| 2007 | European Judo Championships | 3rd | Middleweight (90 kg) |
| 2006 | European Judo Championships | 3rd | Middleweight (90 kg) |
| 2005 | European Judo Championships | 2nd | Middleweight (90 kg) |
| 2002 | European Judo Championships | 3rd | Half middleweight (81 kg) |
| 2001 | Mediterranean Games | 1st | Half middleweight (81 kg) |
