= Almas Atayev =

Kazakhstani judoka (born 1981)

Personal information
- Born: 24 May 1981 (age 45)
- Height: 176 cm (5 ft 9 in)
Medal record
Men's Judo
Representing Kazakhstan
Asian Games
Silver medal – second place	2006 Doha	-81 kg

Almas Janadiluly Atayev (Kazakh: Алмас Жанаділұлы Атаев; born 24 May 1981) is a Kazakhstani judoka.

He won the silver medal in the half-middleweight (81 kg) category of the 2006 Asian Games, having lost the final match to Damdinsürengiin Nyamkhüü of Mongolia.

He currently resides in Öskemen.
