= Anthony Rodriguez (judoka) =

French judoka (born 1979)

Personal information
- Born: 4 November 1979 (age 46) Orléans, France
- Occupation: Judoka

Sport
- Country: France
- Sport: Judo
- Weight class: ‍–‍81 kg

Achievements and titles
- Olympic Games: R32 (2008)
- World Champ.: (silver) (2007)
- European Champ.: 5th (2005)
Medal record
Men's judo
Representing France
World Championships
Silver medal – second place	2007 Rio de Janeiro	‍–‍81 kg
European Junior Championships
Silver medal – second place	1998 Bucharest	‍–‍73 kg

Profile at external databases
- IJF: 17881
- JudoInside.com: 6547
- Updated on 19 November 2022

Anthony Rodriguez (born 4 November 1979 in Orléans) is a French judoka.

== Achievements ==
Year	Tournament	Place	Weight class
2007	World Judo Championships	2nd	Half middleweight (81 kg)
2005	World Judo Championships	5th	Half middleweight (81 kg)
2005	European Judo Championships	5th	Half middleweight (81 kg)
