= Kazunori Kubota =

Japanese judoka (born 1975)

Personal information
- Born: 13 December 1975 (age 50) Kawasaki, Kanagawa, Japan

Sport
- Sport: Judo
Medal record
Representing Japan
World Championships
| Gold medal – first place | 1999 Birmingham | Team |
Summer Universiade
| Gold medal – first place | 1995 Fukuoka | -78 kg |
| Bronze medal – third place | 1999 Palma de Mallorca | -81 kg |

Kazunori Kubota (窪田 和則, Kubota Kazunori; born 13 December 1975) is a Japanese judoka.

Kubota is from Kawasaki, Kanagawa. He began judo at the age of a 2nd grader and after graduation from Kokushikan University, he belonged to Tokyo Metropolitan Police Department

Kubota received a gold medal at the Jigoro Kano Cup in 1996 and silver medal at the World Masters Munich in 1997. He also participate Asian Games in 1998, but defeated by Kwak Ok-Chol from North Korea

As of 2009, Kubota coaches judo at All-Japan national team and Tokyo Metropolitan Police Department.
