= Morgan Endicott-Davies =

Australian judoka

Personal information
- Full name: Morgan Martin Endicott-Davies
- Born: 31 January 1974 (age 52) Balclutha, Otago, New Zealand
- Education: Western Sydney University
- Height: 179 cm (5 ft 10 in)
- Weight: 81 kg (179 lb)

Sport
- Country: New Zealand
- Sport: Judo
- Now coaching: Abigail Paduch

Morgan Martin Endicott-Davies (born 31 January 1974) is an Australian Olympic judo competitor. He is a multiple-time Australian and New Zealand national judo champion and international medallist in judo. He is widely known for his uchi mata, taiotoshi, and juji gatame techniques.

== Early years ==
Endicott-Davies' mother is Japanese (from Kyoto) and his father, Ivor Endicott-Davies, came from the small town of Balclutha in New Zealand's South Island. His father received his 6th dan in judo in 2007.

In 1993—at the age of 19—Endicott-Davies travelled from Australia to Japan with his family and stayed there for one year. Soon after arriving in Japan, he took up judo, learning at Waseda University Judo Club. He received his black belt after twelve months. During his time in Japan, he also learned Japanese.

== Career highlights ==
Morgan is a 4 times Australian Men's Judo Champion and 4 times New Zealand Men's Judo Champion representations include Olympic Games in Athens 2004 Commonwealth Games in Manchester 2002 Aside from Representing Australia in Judo Morgan has officially represented Australia at World Level in Sambo, Brazilian JiuJitsu and Sumo.

In 1995, a year after returning to Australia, he won a bronze medal at the Australian national titles.

After cross-training with an All-Japan amateur sumo champion for three years, Endicott-Davies competed at the Sumo World Championships in 1997, winning a bronze medal in the under 85 kg division.

His first international judo competition followed in 1998 at the Oceania championships, where he won a bronze medal in the under 81 kg division and a silver in the open weight division.

He was a reserve for the Sydney Olympics judo team in 2000.

He won his first Australian National Judo Championships gold medal in 2001, and went on to compete in the Pacific Rim Championships, British Open, Kano Cup (World Level) and then the 2002 Commonwealth Games in Manchester, where he placed in the top four.

=== Olympic Games - Athens 2004 ===
After ten years of a grueling training regime in Australia, Japan, Korea, England and Germany, he won the Oceania championships in 2003, and was selected for the 2004 Australian Olympic judo team. He competed in Athens, finishing ninth. He also represented Australia at the 2005 World Judo Championships in Cairo, where he was unplaced.

In 2008 Morgan was selected to represent Australia in the U/100 kg Division at the 2008 Jigaro Kano Cup in Tokyo, Japan after becoming the Number One Ranked Judoka in Australia in the Under 100 kg Weight Category.

In 2009 Morgan was again selected to represent Australia again in U/100 kg Division at the Pacific Rim Championships in Taipei taking a Bronze Medal and the World Championships in the Netherlands.

Morgan is currently the head instructor of Zenbu Judo Club, a club he founded in July 2005. The club is located in Silverwater, Sydney Australia.

== Other ==
Endicott-Davies received a Bachelor of Commerce Degree in Management from the University of Western Sydney in 1998.

== Sources ==
- Morgan Endicott-Davies at JudoInside.com
- Memoirs of... an Athens judo athlete - jStyle magazine, issue #2. 2007.
- Profile of Morgan Endicott-Davies (zenbu.com.au)
