= Mario Valles =

Colombian judoka (born 1977)

Personal information
- Born: 1982 (age 43–44)
Medal record
Men's Judo
Representing Colombia
Pan American Games
Silver medal – second place	2007 Rio de Janeiro	Half Middleweight
Bronze medal – third place	2003 S. Domingo	Half Middleweight
South American Games
Silver medal – second place	2006 Buenos Aires	Half Middleweight

Mario Antonio Valles Velásquez (born February 3, 1977, in Dagua, Valle del Cauca) is a male judoka from Colombia, who won the bronze medal in the men's half middleweight division (– 81 kg) at the 2003 Pan American Games in Santo Domingo, Dominican Republic. He represented his native country at two consecutive Summer Olympics, starting in 2004 in Athens, Greece.
