= Dmitri Nossov =

Russian judoka

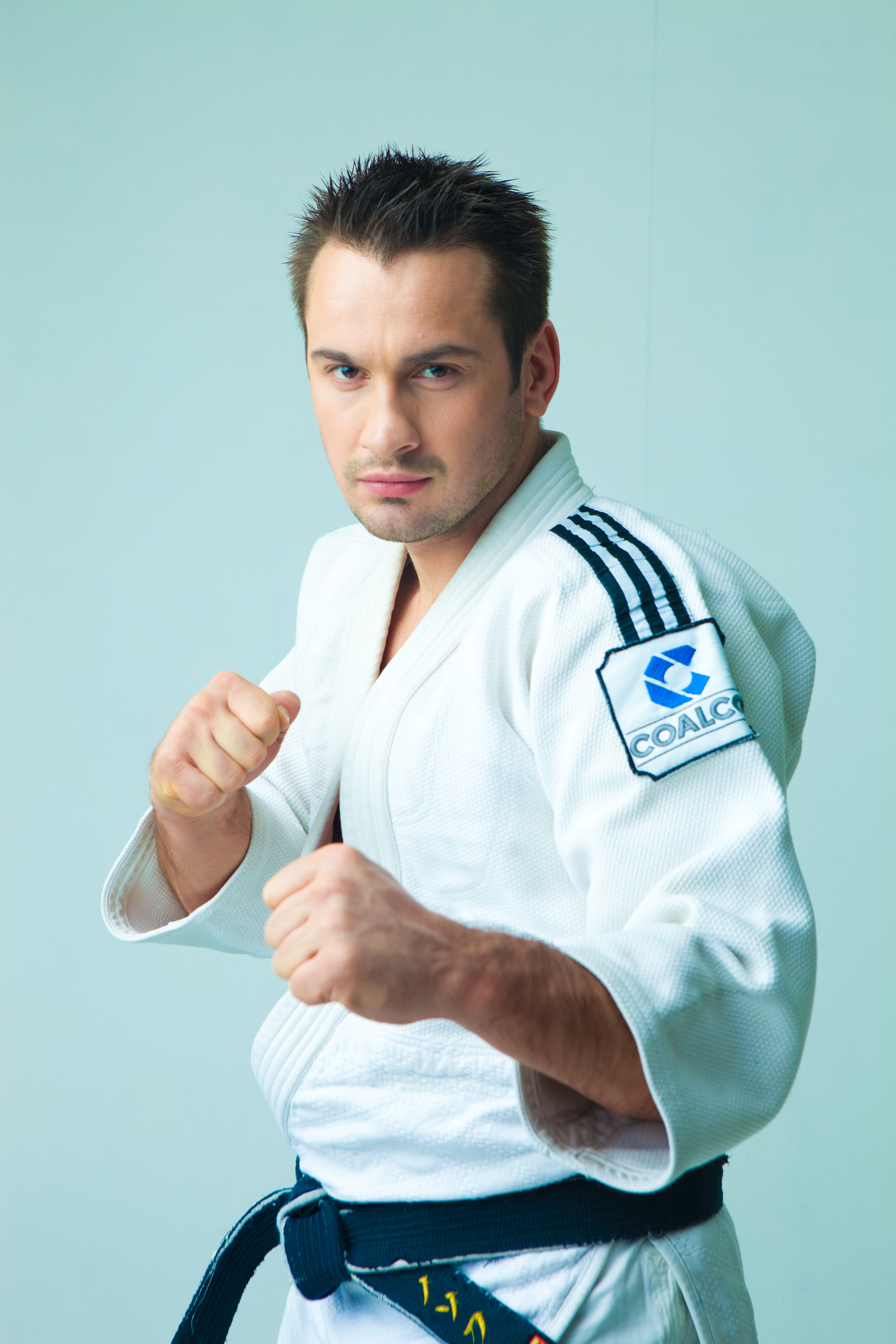
- Born: Dmitri Yurievich Nossov; 9 April 1980 (age 46); Chita-46, Ulyotovsky District, Chita Oblast, RSFSR, USSR (now Gorny, Zabaykalsky Krai, Russia)
- Nationality: (Russia) Russian
- Division: Half-middleweight (‍–‍81 kg)
- Style: Sambo, Judo, Brazilian Jiu-Jitsu
- Fighting out of: Nizhny Novgorod, Russia
- Team: Nossov Team; Sambo-70
- Rank: black belt and 1st International Master in Sambo black belt in Judo brown belt in Brazilian Jiu-Jitsu

Dmitri Yurievich Nossov (Russian: Дмитрий Юрьевич Носов; born 9 April 1980) is a Russian judoka and politician.

He won a bronze medal in the half-middleweight (‍–‍81 kg) division at the 2004 Summer Olympics, despite breaking his arm fighting the semifinal.

He has been a Deputy of the State Duma from the LDPR from 2011 to 2016.

== Achievements ==
Year	Tournament	Place	Weight class
2005	World Judo Championships	7th	Half middleweight (81 kg)
2004	Olympic Games	3rd	Half middleweight (81 kg)
2004	European Judo Championships	3rd	Half middleweight (81 kg)

== Political career ==
In 2011, he was elected to the State Duma by Liberal Democratic Party list.

On 23 September 2015, the head of the Liberal Democratic Party Supreme Council Igor Lebedev announced that he had decided to expel Nossov from the party for the inflated scandal with rapper Guf, since, according to the politician, it was Dmitri Nossov who initiated the detention of Guf: "all actions of Nossov have nothing to do with the party. This is his personal PR. He will no longer be a member of the Liberal Democratic Party».

On 11 March 2016 Liberal Democratic Party leader Vladimir Zhirinovsky said that Nossov will not be run to the State Duma from this party in the September election. The reasons cited were Nossov's inability to work with voters and party structures, as well as his admiration for Stalin's personality, going against the party's position. After that, Nossov made an attempt to participate in the primaries of United Russia and to be nominated as a Deputy from this party, but his application was canceled due to membership in the LDPR. On 13 April, Nossov was expelled from the LDPR for "loss of connection with the party", fascination with his own PR and the creation of a "personal guard" under the guise of the "Anti-dealer" movement. The proposal to hand over the mandate Nossov ignored, and on 20 June he was expelled from the faction with the words "for treason».

As a result, Dmitri Nossov was nominated by the Communist party in the Divnogorsk single-member constituency of Krasnoyarsk Krai. In the election, Nossov took second place and was defeated by United Russia candidate Viktor Zubarev.

=== 2024 presidential candidacy ===
In December 2017, he announced his intention to run for President of Russia in 2024.

According to him, he does not agree with the expression of the State Duma Speaker Vyacheslav Volodin that "no Putin — no Russia". He wants Russia to be even without Putin, so that Russia will be a strong state, just power in 200–300 years, which its citizens would be proud of and which would be respected throughout the world.

=== Political positions ===
Dmitri Nossov is an active fighter against tobacco and drugs. Is a member of the movement "Anti-Dealer", which is fighting drugs

In the State Duma, he created and headed an inter-factional group to combat lobbying in socially important bills, which included representatives of all parliamentary factions. One of the results of the group's work was amendments to the "anti-smoking" law, as well as a bill on penalties for violation of this law. In April 2016, he proposed amendments to the law "on protection of citizens' health from exposure to ambient tobacco smoke and the consequences of tobacco consumption" in terms of introducing temporary restrictions on the sale of cigarettes.

In 2015, he asked the Federal Drug Control Service to check seven articles of the Russian Wikipedia containing, in his opinion, information on the manufacture of drugs prohibited for distribution in Russia. According to the results of this check, Roskomnadzor on 23 November included 4 articles in the Unified register of banned sites.

He is a supporter of Stalin's policy and believes that Stalin's repressions are largely invented.
