= Nuno Delgado =

Portuguese judoka (born 1976)

Personal information
- Born: 27 August 1976 (age 49)
- Occupation: Judoka

Sport
- Country: Portugal
- Sport: Judo
- Weight class: –81 kg

Achievements and titles
- Olympic Games: (bronze) (2000)
- World Champ.: 5th (1999)
- European Champ.: (gold) (1999)
Medal record
Men's judo
Representing Portugal
Olympic Games
Bronze medal – third place	2000 Sydney	‍–‍81 kg
European Championships
Gold medal – first place	1999 Bratislava	‍–‍81 kg
Silver medal – second place	2001 Madrid	Men's team
Silver medal – second place	2003 Düsseldorf	‍–‍81 kg

Profile at external databases
- IJF: 6143
- JudoInside.com: 6897
- Updated on 31 May 2023

Nuno Miguel Delgado ComIH (born 27 August 1976) is a former Portuguese judoka who became known for winning Portugal's first Olympic medal in judo – a bronze in the under-81 kg category at the 2000 Summer Olympics, in Sydney, Australia. He was also senior European champion (Bratislava 1999).

== Personal life ==
Born in Portugal, Delgado is of Cape Verdean descent.
