= Mehman Azizov =

Azerbaijani Olympic judoka

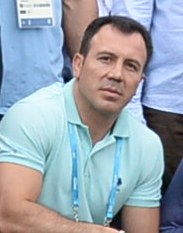
- Mehman Azizov at the 2016 Summer Olympics as a coach of Azerbaijani judo team
Medal record
Men's judo
Representing Azerbaijan
European Championships
Silver medal – second place	1998 Oviedo	81 kg
Summer Universiade
Silver medal – second place	2001 Beijing	81 kg

Mehman Azizov (born January 1, 1976) is an Azerbaijani former judoka.

He finished in joint fifth place in the half-middleweight (81 kg) division at the 2004 Summer Olympics, having lost the bronze medal match to Dmitri Nossov of Russia. Video has circulated online that appears to show Azerbaijani Judo Olympian, Mehman Azizov abusing a child in his care during martial arts practice. The child is reported to have died from injuries sustained during the abuse. It is unclear if Azizov has been held responsible for the child's death. The International Judo Federation has yet to comment on the abuse.

== Achievements ==
Year	Tournament	Place	Weight class
2004	Olympic Games	5th	Half middleweight (81 kg)
2004	European Judo Championships	5th	Half middleweight (81 kg)
2001	Universiade	2nd	Half middleweight (81 kg)
1998	European Judo Championships	2nd	Half middleweight (81 kg)
