= Kazem Sarikhani =

Iranian judoka (1978–2013)

Personal information
- Born: 5 April 1978
- Died: 10 October 2013 (aged 35)
- Occupation: Judoka

Sport
- Sport: Judo

Profile at external databases
- JudoInside.com: 9976

Kazem Sarikhani (Persian: کاظم ساریخانی, 5 April 1978 – 10 October 2013) was an Iranian judoka. He competed in the Men's 81 kg event at the 2000 Summer Olympics.
