= Reza Chahkhandagh =

Iranian judoka

Medal record

Representing Iran

Men's Judo

Asian Championships
| Silver medal – second place | 2004 Almaty | 81 kg |
| Bronze medal – third place | 2005 Tashkent | 81 kg |

Reza Chahkhandagh (Persian: رضا چاه خندق, born July 29, 1982) is an Iranian judoka.

Participating at the 2004 Olympic Games, he was stopped in the repechage round of 16 by Adil Belgaid of Morocco. He finished in joint fifth place in the half-middleweight (81 kg) division at the 2006 Asian Games, having lost to Takashi Ono of Japan in the bronze medal match.
