= Cédric Claverie =

French judoka (born 1976)

Personal information
- Born: 6 December 1976 (age 48)
- Occupation: Judoka

Sport
- Sport: Judo

Profile at external databases
- JudoInside.com: 2445

Cédric Claverie (born 6 December 1976) is a French judoka.

== Achievements ==
Year	Tournament	Place	Weight class
2003	World Judo Championships	7th	Half middleweight (81 kg)
2003	European Judo Championships	5th	Half middleweight (81 kg)
2001	Universiade	3rd	Half middleweight (81 kg)
