= Guo Lei =

Chinese judoka

Guo Lei (born April 26, 1982 in Baoding, Hebei) is a male Chinese judoka who competed at the 2008 Summer Olympics in the Half middleweight (73–81 kg) event.

== Major performances ==
- 2003 National Championships - 1st;
- 2006 National Champions Tournament - 1st;
- 2006 Asian Games - 3rd

== See also ==
- China at the 2008 Summer Olympics
