= Robert Krawczyk =

Polish judoka

Personal information
- Born: 26 March 1978 (age 48) Tarnowskie Góry
- Occupation: Judo coach
- Employer: Austrian Judo Federation

Sport
- Country: Poland
- Sport: Judo
- Weight class: ‍–‍81 kg
- Rank: 3rd dan black belt

Achievements and titles
- Olympic Games: 5th (2004)
- World Champ.: (bronze) (2003)
- European Champ.: (gold) (2007)
Medal record
Men's judo
Representing Poland
World Championships
Bronze medal – third place	2003 Osaka	‍–‍81 kg
European Championships
Gold medal – first place	2007 Belgrade	‍–‍81 kg
Bronze medal – third place	2000 Wrocław	‍–‍81 kg
Bronze medal – third place	2002 Maribor	‍–‍81 kg
Bronze medal – third place	2005 Rotterdam	‍–‍81 kg
IJF Grand Prix
Gold medal – first place	2009 Abu Dhabi	‍–‍81 kg
Bronze medal – third place	2010 Düsseldorf	‍–‍81 kg
European Junior Championships
Bronze medal – third place	1996 Monte Carlo	‍–‍78 kg

Profile at external databases
- IJF: 754
- JudoInside.com: 1126
- Updated on 16 November 2022

Robert Krawczyk (born 26 March 1978, in Tarnowskie Góry) is a Polish judoka. He was the national coach of Austria since May 2022. He left the Austrian Judo Federation when his contract ends in December 2024

== Achievements ==
Year	Tournament	Place	Weight class
2007	World Judo Championships	5th	Half middleweight (81 kg)
2007	European Judo Championships	1st	Half middleweight (81 kg)
2005	European Judo Championships	3rd	Half middleweight (81 kg)
2004	Olympic Games	5th	Half middleweight (81 kg)
2003	World Judo Championships	3rd	Half middleweight (81 kg)
2002	European Judo Championships	3rd	Half middleweight (81 kg)
2000	European Judo Championships	3rd	Half middleweight (81 kg)
1998	European Judo Championships	7th	Half middleweight (81 kg)
