= Farkhod Turayev =

Uzbekistani judoka (born 1974)

Personal information
- Nationality: Uzbekistani
- Born: 14 June 1974 (age 52)

Sport
- Sport: Judo

Farkhod Turayev (born 14 June 1974) is an Uzbekistani judoka. He competed in the men's half-middleweight event at the 2000 Summer Olympics.
