= Florian Wanner =

German judoka (born 1978)

Personal information
- Born: 2 February 1978 (age 48)
- Occupation: Judoka

Sport
- Country: Germany
- Sport: Judo
- Weight class: ‍–‍81 kg
- Rank: 5th dan black belt

Achievements and titles
- Olympic Games: 7th (2004)
- World Champ.: (2003)
- European Champ.: (bronze) (2003)
Medal record
Men's judo
Representing Germany
World Championships
Gold medal – first place	2003 Osaka	‍–‍81 kg
European Championships
Bronze medal – third place	2003 Düsseldorf	‍–‍81 kg
European Junior Championships
Gold medal – first place	1997 Ljubljana	‍–‍78 kg

Profile at external databases
- IJF: 52924
- JudoInside.com: 2232
- Updated on 19 November 2022

Florian Wanner (born 2 February 1978, in Wolfratshausen, Upper Bavaria) is a German judoka. He is a 5th degree black belt.

== Achievements ==
Year	Tournament	Place	Weight class
2004	Olympic Games	7th	Half middleweight (81 kg)
2003	World Judo Championships	1st	Half middleweight (81 kg)
2003	European Judo Championships	3rd	Half middleweight (81 kg)
2002	European Judo Championships	7th	Half middleweight (81 kg)
