= Ruslan Seilkhanov =

Kazakhstani judoka (born 1972)

Personal information
- Nationality: Kazakhstani
- Born: 30 October 1972 (age 52); East Kazakhstan, Kazakh SSR, Soviet Union
- Occupation: Judoka

Sport
- Sport: Judo

Profile at external databases
- JudoInside.com: 3042

Ruslan Seilkhanov (born 30 October 1972) is a Kazakhstani judoka. He competed at the 1996 Summer Olympics and the 2000 Summer Olympics.
