= Gabriel Arteaga =

Cuban judoka (born 1976)

Medal record
Men's Judo
Representing Cuba
Pan American Games
Gold medal – first place	1999	Half Middleweight
Silver medal – second place	2003	Half Middleweight

Gabriel Israel Arteaga Risquet (born October 12, 1976) is a male judoka from Cuba, who won a gold and a silver medal in the men's half middleweight division (– 81 kg) at the Pan American Games (1999 and 2003). He represented his native country at two consecutive Summer Olympics, starting in 2000 in Sydney, Australia.
