= João Neto (judoka) =

Portuguese judoka

Personal information
- Born: 28 December 1981 (age 44)
- Occupation: Judoka

Sport
- Country: Portugal
- Sport: Judo
- Weight class: –73 kg, –81 kg

Achievements and titles
- Olympic Games: 7th (2004)
- World Champ.: (bronze) (2003)
- European Champ.: (gold) (2008)
Medal record
Men's judo
Representing Portugal
World Championships
Bronze medal – third place	2003 Osaka	–73 kg
European Championships
Gold medal – first place	2008 Lisbon	–81 kg
IJF Grand Prix
Silver medal – second place	2009 Hamburg	–81 kg

Profile at external databases
- IJF: 182
- JudoInside.com: 11173
- Updated on 16 November 2022

João André Pinto Neto (born 28 December 1981) is a Portuguese judoka. He was born in Coimbra. He is the European Champion 2008.

== Achievements ==
Year	Tournament	Place	Weight class
2008	European Judo Championships	1st	Half middleweight (81 kg)
2006	European Judo Championships	7th	Half middleweight (81 kg)
2004	Olympic Games	7th	Lightweight (73 kg)
2003	World Judo Championships	3rd	Lightweight (73 kg)
2003	European Judo Championships	5th	Lightweight (73 kg)
