= Moldova at the 2004 Summer Olympics =

- IOC code: MDA
- NOC: National Olympic Committee of the Republic of Moldova
- Website: www.olympic.md (in Romanian)

in Athens
- Competitors: 33 in 8 sports
- Flag bearer: Oleg Moldovan
- Medals: Gold 0 Silver 0 Bronze 0 Total 0

Summer Olympics appearances (overview)
- 1996; 2000; 2004; 2008; 2012; 2016; 2020; 2024

Other related appearances
- Russian Empire (1900–1912); Romania (1924–1936); Soviet Union (1952–1988); Unified Team (1992)

Moldova competed at the 2004 Summer Olympics in Athens, from 13 to 29 August 2004. This was the nation's third consecutive appearance at the Summer Olympics in the post-Soviet era.

Moldova sent a total of 33 athletes (26 men and 7 women), competing in eight various sports. Fourteen of them had competed previously in Sydney, including two Olympic bronze medalists: welterweight boxer Vitalie Gruşac and running target shooter and four-time Olympian Oleg Moldovan. Being the oldest and most sophisticated athlete (aged 37), Moldovan was appointed by the National Olympic Committee of the Republic of Moldova to carry the nation's flag in the opening ceremony.

For the first time since the nation's Summer Olympic debut in 1996, the Moldovans failed to claim a single medal at these Games. Weightlifter Alexandru Bratan narrowly missed the podium with a fourth-place finish in the men's heavyweight class.

== Athletics ==
Moldovan athletes have so far achieved qualifying standards in the following athletics events (up to a maximum of 3 athletes in each event at the 'A' Standard, and 1 at the 'B' Standard).

Key

- Note–Ranks given for track events are within the athlete's heat only
- Q = Qualified for the next round
- q = Qualified for the next round as a fastest loser or, in field events, by position without achieving the qualifying target
- NR = National record
- N/A = Round not applicable for the event
- Bye = Athlete not required to compete in round

Men
Track & road events

Athlete	Event	Heat		Final	
Athlete	Event	Result	Rank	Result	Rank
Fedosei Ciumacenco	20 km walk	—		1:29:06	34
Ion Luchianov	3000 m steeplechase	8:26.17 NR	8	Did not advance	

Field events

Athlete	Event	Qualification		Final	
Athlete	Event	Distance	Position	Distance	Position
Ivan Emilianov	Shot put	19.25	25	Did not advance	
Vadim Hranovschi	Discus throw	55.64	32	Did not advance	
Vladimir Letnicov	Triple jump	16.25	25	Did not advance	
Roman Rozna	Hammer throw	71.78	28	Did not advance	

Combined events – Decathlon

Athlete	Event	100 m	LJ	SP	HJ	400 m	110H	DT	PV	JT	1500 m	Final	Rank
Victor Covalenco	Result	11.28	7.20	13.04	1.85	51.82	15.80	38.19	NM	53.46	4:32.81	6543	30
Victor Covalenco	Points	799	862	670	670	733	755	628	0	640	786	6543	30

Women
Track & road events

Athlete	Event	Heat		Semifinal		Final	
Athlete	Event	Result	Rank	Result	Rank	Result	Rank
Natalia Cercheș	10000 m	—				34:04.97	27
Olga Cristea	800 m	2:08.97	6	Did not advance			
Svetlana Şepelev-Tcaci	Marathon	—				3:03:29	61

Field events

Athlete	Event	Qualification		Final	
Athlete	Event	Distance	Position	Distance	Position
Olga Bolşova	Triple jump	13.90	24	Did not advance	
Inna Gliznutsa	High jump	1.85	=26	Did not advance	

== Boxing ==
Moldova has so far qualified boxers for the following events:

Athlete	Event	Round of 32	Round of 16	Quarterfinals	Semifinals	Final	
Athlete	Event	Opposition Result	Opposition Result	Opposition Result	Opposition Result	Opposition Result	Rank
Igor Samoilenco	Flyweight	Gamboa (CUB); L 33–46	Did not advance				
Vitalie Gruşac	Welterweight	Bye	Kim J-J (KOR); L 20–23	Did not advance			

== Cycling ==
=== Road ===
Athlete	Event	Time	Rank
Ruslan Ivanov	Men's road race	5:50:35	54
Igor Pugaci	Men's road race	5:50:35	66

== Judo ==
Moldova has qualified one judoka.

Athlete	Event	Round of 32	Round of 16	Quarterfinals	Semifinals	Repechage	Final / BM	
Athlete	Event	Opposition Result	Opposition Result	Opposition Result	Opposition Result	Opposition Result	Opposition Result	Rank
Victor Bivol	−73 kg	Leon (VEN); W 100–000	Malekmohammadi (IRI); W 100–000	Neto (POR); W 100–000	Lee W-H (KOR); L 000–100	Bye	Guilheiro (BRA); L 000–100	5

== Shooting ==
Moldova's only shooter in Athens failed to advance to the final in the 10 metre running target event.

Men

Athlete	Event	Qualification		Final	
Athlete	Event	Points	Rank	Points	Rank
Oleg Moldovan	10 m running target	568	14	Did not advance	

== Swimming ==
Moldovan swimmers earned qualifying standards in the following events (up to a maximum of 2 swimmers in each event at the A-standard time, and 1 at the B-standard time):

Men

Athlete	Event	Heat		Semifinal		Final	
Athlete	Event	Time	Rank	Time	Rank	Time	Rank
Andrei Capitanciuc	100 m breaststroke	1:05.65	=47	Did not advance			
Octavian Guţu	100 m freestyle	51.84	47	Did not advance			
Alexandru Ivlev	100 m backstroke	1:00.13	42	Did not advance			
Andrei Mihailov	200 m backstroke	2:06.97	34	Did not advance			
Ștefan Pinciuc	200 m freestyle	1:54.56	56	Did not advance			
Sergiu Postică	200 m breaststroke	2:27.21	45	Did not advance			
Victor Rogut	400 m freestyle	4:01.68	35	—		Did not advance	
Andrei Zaharov	200 m individual medley	2:07.40	39	Did not advance			

Women

Athlete	Event	Heat		Semifinal		Final	
Athlete	Event	Time	Rank	Time	Rank	Time	Rank
Nicoleta Coica	100 m freestyle	59.85	47	Did not advance			
Maria Tregubova	50 m freestyle	28.40	48	Did not advance			

== Weightlifting ==
Moldova has qualified three places in weightlifting.

Athlete	Event	Snatch		Clean & Jerk		Total	Rank
Athlete	Event	Result	Rank	Result	Rank	Total	Rank
Eugen Bratan	Men's −94 kg	175	4	205	13	380	10
Vadim Vacarciuc	Men's −94 kg	~~175~~	DNF	—	—	—	DNF
Alexandru Bratan	Men's −105 kg	192.5	2	222.5	5	415	4

== Wrestling ==
Key:

- VT - Victory by Fall.
- PP - Decision by Points - the loser with technical points.
- PO - Decision by Points - the loser without technical points.

Men's freestyle

Athlete	Event	Elimination Pool			Quarterfinal	Semifinal	Final / BM	
Athlete	Event	Opposition Result	Opposition Result	Rank	Opposition Result	Opposition Result	Opposition Result	Rank
Ghenadie Tulbea	−55 kg	Montero (CUB); L 0–3 ^{PO}	Abas (USA); L 1–3 ^{PP}	3	Did not advance			21
Ruslan Bodişteanu	−66 kg	Asgarov (AZE); L 1–3 ^{PP}	Kelly (USA); L 0–3 ^{PP}	3	Did not advance			19

== See also ==
- Moldova at the 2004 Summer Paralympics
