= Moldova at the 2000 Summer Olympics =

- IOC code: MDA
- NOC: National Olympic Committee of the Republic of Moldova
- Website: www.olympic.md (in Romanian)

in Sydney
- Competitors: 34 (29 men and 5 women) in 7 sports
- Flag bearer: Vadim Vacarciuc
- Medals Ranked 61st: Gold 0 Silver 1 Bronze 1 Total 2

Summer Olympics appearances (overview)
- 1996; 2000; 2004; 2008; 2012; 2016; 2020; 2024

Other related appearances
- Russian Empire (1900–1912); Romania (1924–1936); Soviet Union (1952–1988); Unified Team (1992)

Moldova was represented at the 2000 Summer Olympics in Sydney, New South Wales, Australia by the National Olympic Committee of the Republic of Moldova.

In total, 34 athletes including 29 men and five women represented Moldova in seven different sports including athletics, boxing, judo, shooting, swimming, weightlifting and wrestling.

Moldova won two medals at the games after Oleg Moldovan claimed silver in the men's shooting 10 m running target and Vitalie Grușac won bronze in the boxing welterweight category.

== Competitors ==
In total, 34 athletes represented Moldova at the 2000 Summer Olympics in Sydney, New South Wales, Australia across seven different sports.

Sport	Men	Women	Total
Athletics	9	2	11
Boxing	1	—	1
Judo	3	1	4
Shooting	1	0	1
Swimming	9	1	10
Weightlifting	3	0	3
Wrestling	4	—	4
Total	29	5	34

== Medalists ==
Moldova won two medals at the games after Oleg Moldovan claimed silver in the men's shooting 10 m running target and Vitalie Grușac won bronze in the boxing welterweight category.

Medal	Name	Sport	Event
Silver	Oleg Moldovan	Shooting	Men's 10 m running target
Bronze	Vitalie Grușac	Boxing	Welterweight

== Athletics ==
In total, 11 Moldovan athletes participated in the athletics events – Olga Bolșova and Inna Gliznutza in the women's high jump, Vitalie Cercheș in the men's 800 m, Fedosei Ciumacenco in the men's 50 km race walk, Ivan Emelianov in the men's shot put, Valentina Enachi in the women's marathon, Efim Motpan in the men's 20 km race walk, Iaroslav Musinschi in the men's 3,000 m steeplechase, Roman Rozna in the men's hammer throw, Valeriu Vlas in the men's marathon and Vadim Zadoinov in the men's 400 m hurdles.

== Boxing ==
In total, one Moldovan athlete participated in the boxing events – Vitalie Grușac in the welterweight category.

== Judo ==
In total, four Moldovan athletes participated in the Judo events – Victor Bivol in the men's –66 kg category, Ludmila Cristea in the women's –57 kg category, Victor Florescu in the men's –90 kg category and Giorgi Kurdgelashvili in the men's –60 kg category.

== Shooting ==
In total, one Moldovan athlete participated in the shooting events – Oleg Moldovan in the men's 10 m running target.

== Swimming ==
In total, 10 Moldovan athletes participated in the swimming events – Serghei Stolearenco in the men's 50 m freestyle, Andrei Cecan in the men's 200 m freestyle, Victor Rogut in the men's 400 m freestyle, Alexandru Ivlev in the men's 100 m backstroke, Andrei Mihailov in the men's 200 m backstroke, Vadim Tatarov in the men's 100 m breaststroke, Dumitro Zastoico in the men's 100 m butterfly and the men's 200 m butterfly, Andrei Zaharov in the men's 200 m individual medley, Serghei Mariniuc in the men's 400 m individual medley and Maria Tregubova in the women's 50 m freestyle.

Athlete	Event	Heat		Semifinal		Final	
Athlete	Event	Time	Rank	Time	Rank	Time	Rank
Serghei Stolearenco	50 m freestyle	00:23.84	47	did not advance			
Andrei Cecan	200 m freestyle	01:53.23	31	did not advance			
Victor Rogut	400 m freestyle	04:01.42	38	did not advance			
Alexandru Ivlev	100 m backstroke	00:57.91	38	did not advance			
Andrei Mihailov	200 m backstroke	02:06.67	38	did not advance			
Vadim Tatarov	100 m breaststroke	01:04.12	36	did not advance			
Dumitro Zastoico	100 m butterfly	00:58.55	59	did not advance			
Dumitro Zastoico	200 m butterfly	02:09.34	44	did not advance			
Andrei Zaharov	200 m medley	02:09.13	47	did not advance			
Serghei Mariniuc	400 m medley	04:23.57	22	did not advance			

Athlete	Event	Heat		Semifinal		Final	
Athlete	Event	Time	Rank	Time	Rank	Time	Rank
Maria Tregubova	50 m freestyle	00:27.75	54	did not advance			

== Weightlifting ==
In total, three Moldovan athletes participated in the weightlifting events – Alexandru Bratan in the men's –105 kg category, Vladimir Popov in the men's –62 kg category and Vadim Vacarciuc in the men's –94 kg category.

Athlete	Event	Snatch			Clean & Jerk			Total	Rank
Athlete	Event	1	2	3	1	2	3	Total	Rank
Vladimir Popov	– 62 kg	130.0	135.0	~~137.5~~	~~160.0~~	~~160.0~~	160.0	295.0	7
Vadim Vacarciuc	– 94 kg	172.4	177.5	~~180.0~~	~~220.0~~	220.0	~~225.0~~	397.5	5
Alexandru Bratan	– 105 kg	190.0	~~195.0~~	~~195.0~~	~~220.0~~	~~220.0~~	220.0	410.0	6

== Wrestling ==
In total, four Moldovan athletes participated in the wrestling events – Ruslan Bodișteanu in the freestyle –63 kg category, Octavian Cuciuc in the freestyle –58 kg category, Ion Diaconu in the freestyle –69 kg category and Vitalie Railean in the freestyle –54 kg category.
