= Israel at the 2004 Summer Olympics =

- IOC code: ISR
- NOC: Olympic Committee of Israel
- Website: www.olympicsil.co.il (in Hebrew and English)

in Athens
- Competitors: 36 in 13 sports
- Flag bearers: Ariel Ze'evi (opening); Gal Fridman (closing)
- Medals Ranked 52nd: Gold 1 Silver 0 Bronze 1 Total 2

Summer Olympics appearances (overview)
- 1952; 1956; 1960; 1964; 1968; 1972; 1976; 1980; 1984; 1988; 1992; 1996; 2000; 2004; 2008; 2012; 2016; 2020; 2024

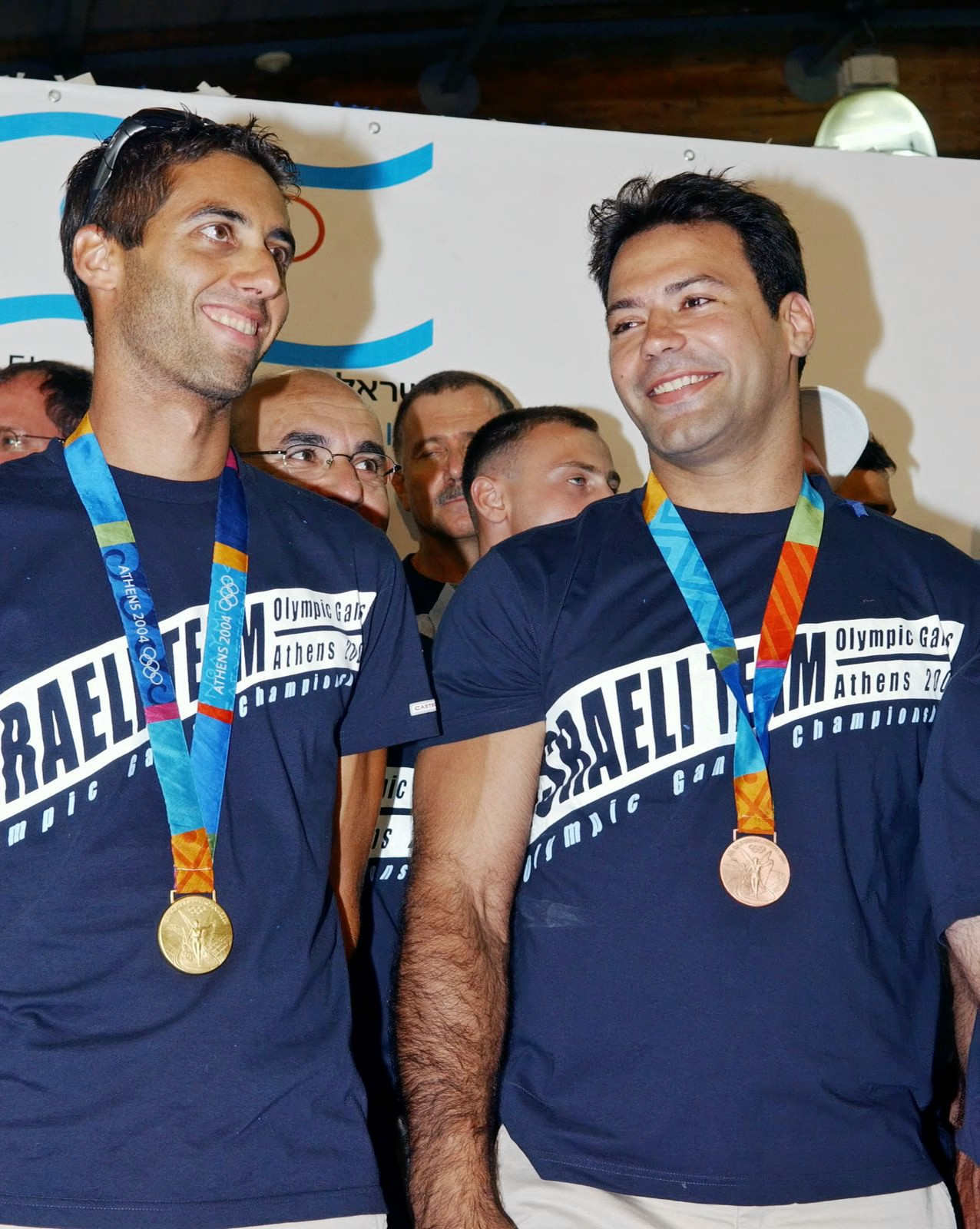
Israel's Olympic medalists Gal Fridman (sailing) and Ariel Ze'evi (judo)

Israel competed at the 2004 Summer Olympics in Athens, Greece, from 13 to 29 August 2004. It was the nation's thirteenth appearance at the Summer Olympics.

The Olympic Committee of Israel sent 36 athletes to the Games, 20 men and 16 women, to compete in 13 sports. The team's size was smaller by three from that sent to the previous games in Sydney (which was, by far, the nation's largest delegation). Nine athletes had competed in Sydney, including sprint canoer and Olympic bronze medalist Michael Kolganov and European judo champion Ariel Ze'evi, who later became the nation's flag bearer in the opening ceremony.

Notable Israeli athletes featured tennis men's doubles team Jonathan Erlich and Andy Ram, Russian imports Larissa Kosorukova in sprint canoeing and Alexander Danilov in men's pistol shooting, and synchronized swimming pair Anastasia Gloushkov and Inna Yoffe, the youngest of the team at age 16. Apart from Kosorukova and Danilov (both competed for Russia in 1996), Georgian-born wrestler Gocha Tsitsiashvili and rifle shooter Guy Starik made their third Olympic appearances as the most experienced members of the team.

Israel left Athens with two medals, including its first ever Olympic gold from windsurfer Gal Fridman in men's mistral one design. On the other hand, the bronze medal was awarded to judoka Ariel Ze'evi in men's half-heavyweight division.

== Medalists ==
Medal	Name	Sport	Event	Date
Gold	Gal Fridman	Sailing	Men's sailboard	August 24
Bronze	Ariel Ze'evi	Judo	Men's 100 kg	August 19

== Athletics ==
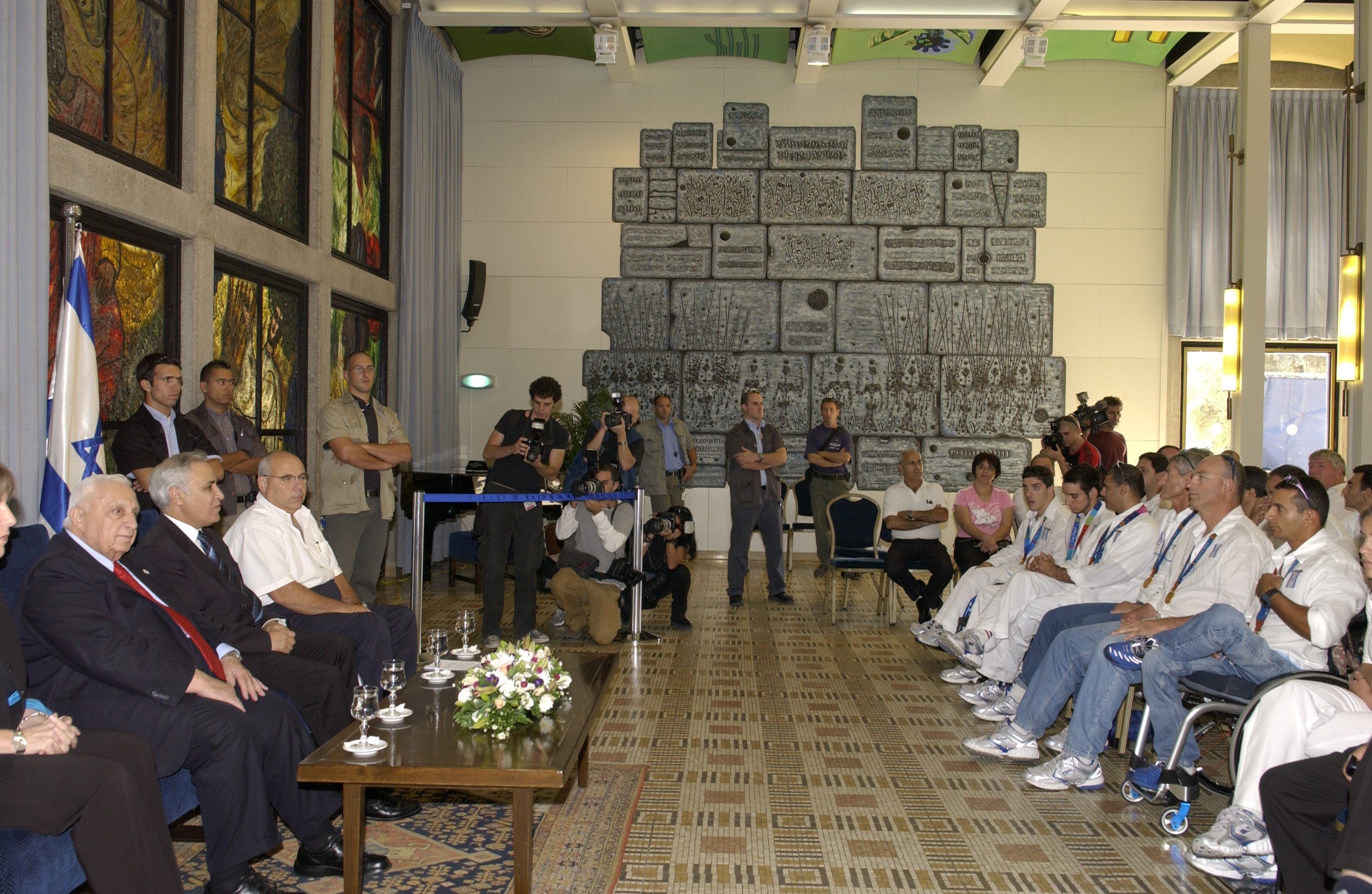
A reception was held for the Israeli athletes who returned from the Athens 2004 Paralympic Games by the Prime Minister Ariel Sharon

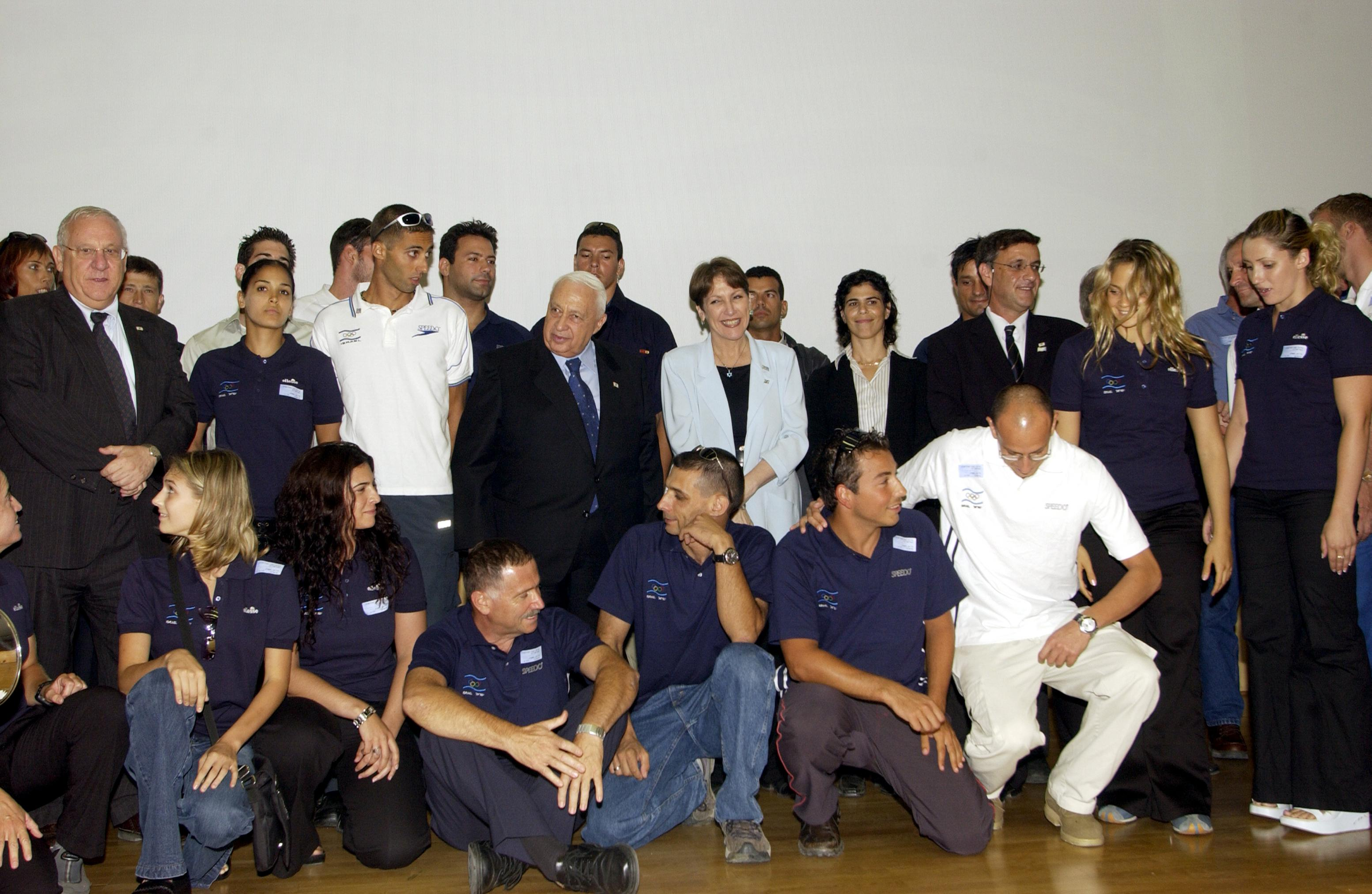
Prime Minister Ariel Sharon and Education Minister Limor Livnat in a group photo with the Israeli Delegation to the 2004 Olympic Games in Athens

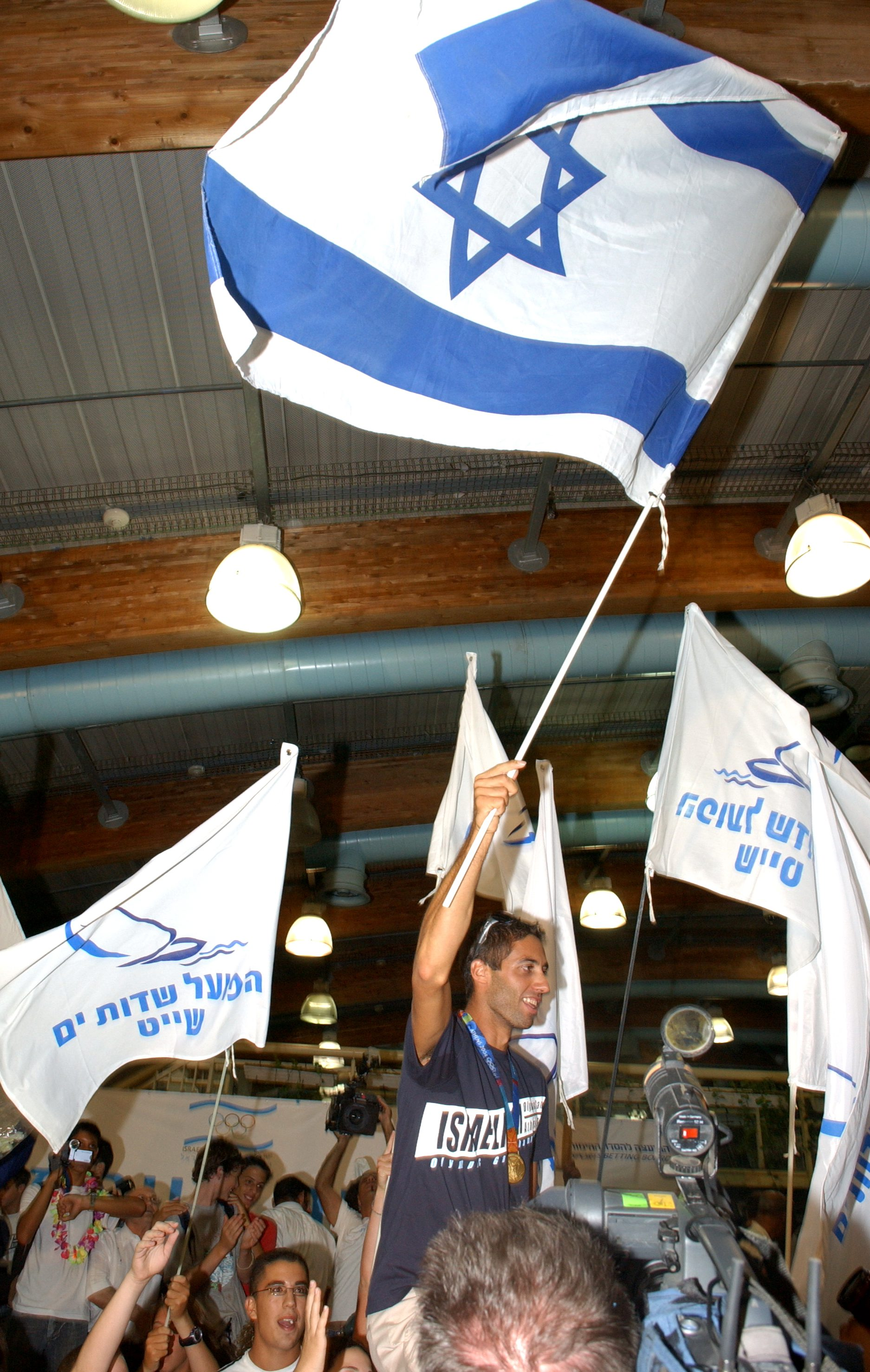
Gold Medalist Gal Fridman at his official reception at Ben Gurion Airport

Israeli athletes have so far achieved qualifying standards in the following athletics events (up to a maximum of 3 athletes in each event at the 'A' Standard, and 1 at the 'B' Standard).

Key

- Note – Ranks given for track events are within the athlete's heat only
- Q = Qualified for the next round
- q = Qualified for the next round as a fastest loser or, in field events, by position without achieving the qualifying target
- NR = National record
- N/A = Round not applicable for the event
- Bye = Athlete not required to compete in round

Men
Track & road events

Athlete	Event	Final	
Athlete	Event	Result	Rank
Asaf Bimro	Marathon	2:25:20	59
Haile Satayin	Marathon	2:17:25	20

Field events

Athlete	Event	Qualification		Final	
Athlete	Event	Distance	Position	Distance	Position
Aleksandr Averbukh	Pole vault	5.70	=1 Q	5.65	8

Women
Track & road events

Athlete	Event	Heat		Semifinal		Final	
Athlete	Event	Result	Rank	Result	Rank	Result	Rank
Nili Abramski	Marathon	—N/a				2:48:08	42
Irina Lenskiy	100 m hurdles	13.75	8	Did not advance			

== Canoeing ==
=== Sprint ===
Athlete	Event	Heats		Semifinals		Final	
Athlete	Event	Time	Rank	Time	Rank	Time	Rank
Michael Kolganov	Men's K-1 500 m	1:39.745	4 q	1:43.411	8	Did not advance	
Roei Yellin	Men's K-1 1000 m	3:34.036	3 q	3:30.005	3 Q	3:43.485	9
Larissa Kosorukova	Women's K-1 500 m	1:54.234	3 q	1:55.096	2 Q	1:53.089	6

Qualification Legend: Q = Qualify to final; q = Qualify to semifinal

== Fencing ==
Israel has qualified one fencer.

Women

Athlete	Event	Round of 32	Round of 16	Quarterfinal	Semifinal	Final / BM	
Athlete	Event	Opposition Score	Opposition Score	Opposition Score	Opposition Score	Opposition Score	Rank
Ayelet Ohayon	Individual foil	Bauer (GER); L 10–15	Did not advance				

== Gymnastics ==
=== Artistic ===
Men

Athlete	Event	Qualification								Final							
Athlete	Event	Apparatus						Total	Rank	Apparatus						Total	Rank
Athlete	Event	F	PH	R	V	PB	HB	Total	Rank	F	PH	R	V	PB	HB	Total	Rank
Pavel Gofman	All-around	9.437	9.475	9.462	9.375	9.612	9.362	56.723	12 Q	9.100	9.262	9.425	9.112	9.725	9.062	55.686	19

=== Rhythmic ===
Athlete	Event	Qualification						Final					
Athlete	Event	Hoop	Ball	Clubs	Ribbon	Total	Rank	Hoop	Ball	Clubs	Ribbon	Total	Rank
Katerina Pisetsky	Individual	22.675	22.750	23.100	21.425	89.950	16	Did not advance					

== Judo ==
Five Israeli judoka qualified for the following events.

Men

Athlete	Event	Preliminary	Round of 32	Round of 16	Quarterfinals	Semifinals	Repechage 1	Repechage 2	Repechage 3	Final / BM	
Athlete	Event	Opposition Result	Opposition Result	Opposition Result	Opposition Result	Opposition Result	Opposition Result	Opposition Result	Opposition Result	Opposition Result	Rank
Gal Yekutiel	−60 kg	Techovas (LTU); W 0101–0000	Williams-Murray (USA); L 0000–1010	Did not advance							
Ehud Vaks	−66 kg	—N/a	Miresmaeili (IRI); W WO	Meridja (ALG); L 0000–0010	Did not advance						
Yoel Razvozov	−73 kg	Bye	Martínez (CUB); W 1000–0000	Fernandes (FRA); L 0001–1000	Did not advance		Xie Jh (CHN); W 1100–0000	Guilheiro (BRA); L 0020–1101	Did not advance		9
Ariel Ze'evi	−100 kg	Bye	Sabino (BRA); W 1010–0100	Monti (ITA); W 1011–0111	Jang (KOR); L 0110–1002	Did not advance	Bye	Moussima (CMR); W 0210–0000	Lemaire (FRA); W 1001–0000	van der Geest (NED); W 1002–0001	3rd place, bronze medalist(s)

Women

Athlete	Event	Round of 32	Round of 16	Quarterfinals	Semifinals	Repechage 1	Repechage 2	Repechage 3	Final / BM	
Athlete	Event	Opposition Result	Opposition Result	Opposition Result	Opposition Result	Opposition Result	Opposition Result	Opposition Result	Opposition Result	Rank
Michal Feinblat	−52 kg	Bye	Monteiro (POR); L 0000–1010	Did not advance						

== Sailing ==
Israeli sailors have qualified one boat for each of the following events.

Men

Athlete	Event	Race											Net points	Final rank
Athlete	Event	1	2	3	4	5	6	7	8	9	10	M*	Net points	Final rank
Gal Fridman	Mistral	~~8~~	3	5	5	1	7	5	1	8	5	2	42	1st place, gold medalist(s)
Udi Gal; Gideon Kliger	470	19	12	6	8	23	9	5	11	23	12	~~DSQ~~	128	15

Women

Athlete	Event	Race											Net points	Final rank
Athlete	Event	1	2	3	4	5	6	7	8	9	10	M*	Net points	Final rank
Lee Korzits	Mistral	15	15	12	~~17~~	12	8	14	12	7	10	12	117	13
Nike Kornecki; Vered Buskila	470	~~OCS~~	11	RAF	19	6	13	12	5	4	13	18	122	18

M = Medal race; OCS = On course side of the starting line; DSQ = Disqualified; DNF = Did not finish; DNS= Did not start; RDG = Redress given

== Shooting ==
Men

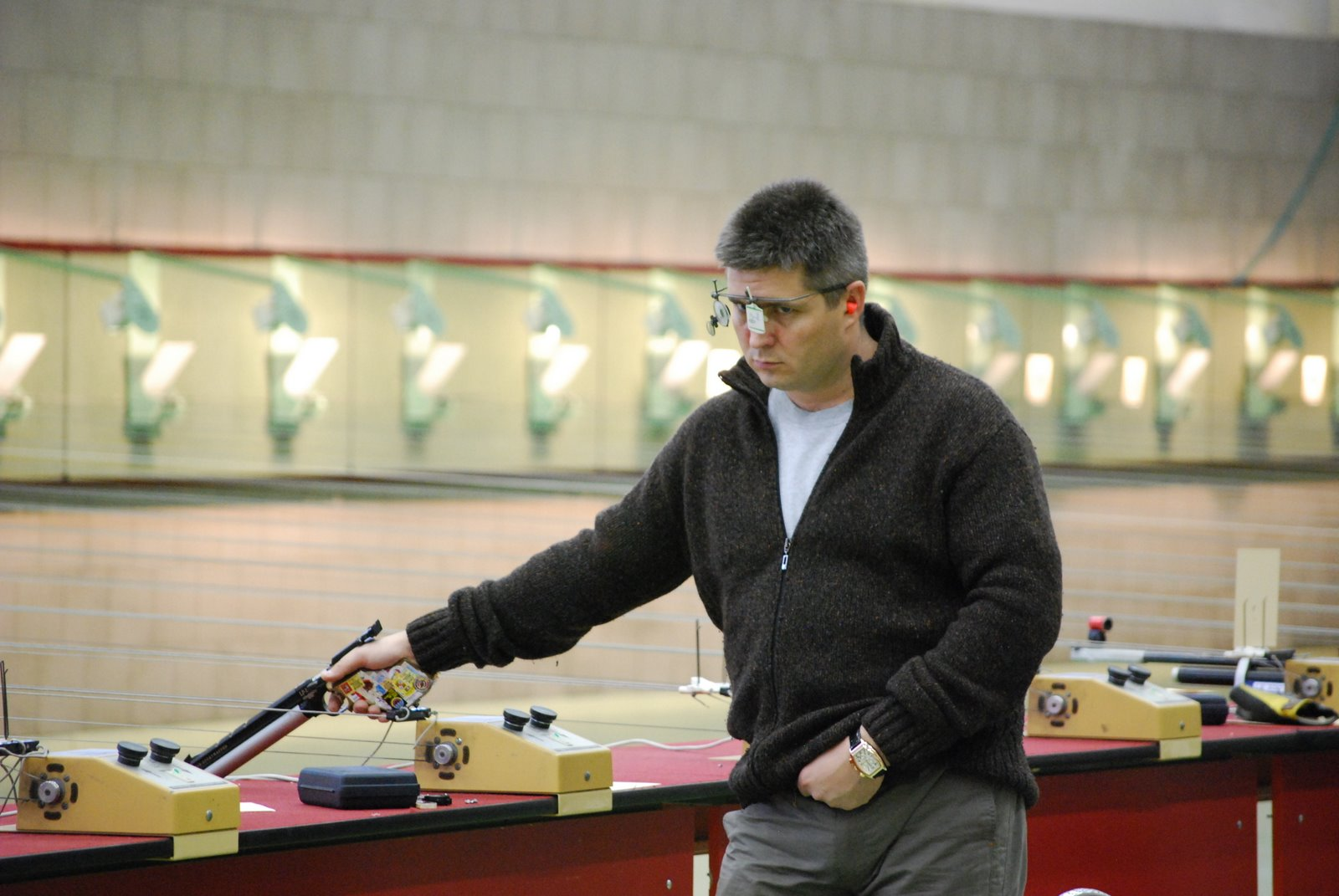
Aleksandr Danilov

Athlete	Event	Qualification		Final	
Athlete	Event	Points	Rank	Points	Rank
Alexander Danilov	10 m air pistol	577	=20	Did not advance	
Alexander Danilov	50 m pistol	554	=15	Did not advance	
Guy Starik	50 m rifle prone	592	=16	Did not advance	

== Swimming ==
Women

Athlete	Event	Heat		Semifinal		Final	
Athlete	Event	Time	Rank	Time	Rank	Time	Rank
Vered Borochovski	100 m butterfly	1:00.69	26	Did not advance			
Vered Borochovski	200 m individual medley	2:20.62	24	Did not advance			
Anna Gostomelsky	50 m freestyle	26.72	35	Did not advance			
Anna Gostomelsky	100 m freestyle	57.15	32	Did not advance			
Anna Gostomelsky	100 m backstroke	1:04.06	28	Did not advance			

== Synchronized swimming ==
Two Israeli synchronized swimmers qualified a spot in the women's duet.

Athlete	Event	Technical routine		Free routine (preliminary)			Free routine (final)		
Athlete	Event	Points	Rank	Points	Total (technical + free)	Rank	Points	Total (technical + free)	Rank
Anastasia Gloushkov; Inna Yoffe	Duet	42.750	16	43.000	85.750	17	Did not advance		

== Table tennis ==
Athlete	Event	Round 1	Round 2	Round 3	Round 4	Quarterfinals	Semifinals	Final / BM	
Athlete	Event	Opposition Result	Opposition Result	Opposition Result	Opposition Result	Opposition Result	Opposition Result	Opposition Result	Rank
Marina Kravchenko	Women's singles	Volakaki (GRE); W 4–0	Badescu (ROM); W 4–2	Boroš (CRO); L 0–4	Did not advance				

== Taekwondo ==
Israel has qualified one taekwondo jin.

Athlete	Event	Round of 16	Quarterfinals	Semifinals	Repechage 1	Repechage 2	Final / BM	
Athlete	Event	Opposition Result	Opposition Result	Opposition Result	Opposition Result	Opposition Result	Opposition Result	Rank
Maya Arusi	Women's −49 kg	Contreras (VEN); L 1–5	Did not advance					

== Tennis ==
Three Israeli tennis players qualified for the following events.

Athlete	Event	Round of 64	Round of 32	Round of 16	Quarterfinals	Semifinals	Final / BM	
Athlete	Event	Opposition Score	Opposition Score	Opposition Score	Opposition Score	Opposition Score	Opposition Score	Rank
Jonathan Erlich; Andy Ram	Men's doubles	—N/a	Enqvist / Söderling (SWE); W 7–5, 6–3	Andreev / Davydenko (RUS); W 6–4, 6–1	Kiefer / Schüttler (GER); L 6–2, 2–6, 2–6	Did not advance		
Anna Smashnova	Women's singles	Garbin (ITA); L 2–6, 1–6	Did not advance					

== Wrestling ==
Key

- VT - Victory by Fall.
- PP - Decision by Points - the loser with technical points.
- PO - Decision by Points - the loser without technical points.

Men's Greco-Roman

Athlete	Event	Elimination Pool			Quarterfinal	Semifinal	Final / BM	
Athlete	Event	Opposition Result	Opposition Result	Rank	Opposition Result	Opposition Result	Opposition Result	Rank
Yasha Manasherov	−74 kg	Khalimov (KAZ); L 0–3 ^{PO}	Recuero (ESP); L 0–5 ^{VT}	3	Did not advance			19
Gotsha Tsitsiashvili	−84 kg	Noumonvi (FRA); W 3–1 ^{PP}	Mishin (RUS); L 0–3 ^{PO}	2	Did not advance			14
Yuri Evseitchik	−120 kg	López (CUB); L 0–3 ^{PO}	Gül (TUR); L 0–3 ^{PO}	3	Did not advance			19

== See also ==
- Israel at the 2004 Summer Paralympics
