= Judo at the 2008 Summer Olympics – Men's 73 kg =

Men's 73 kg at the Games of the XXIX Olympiad
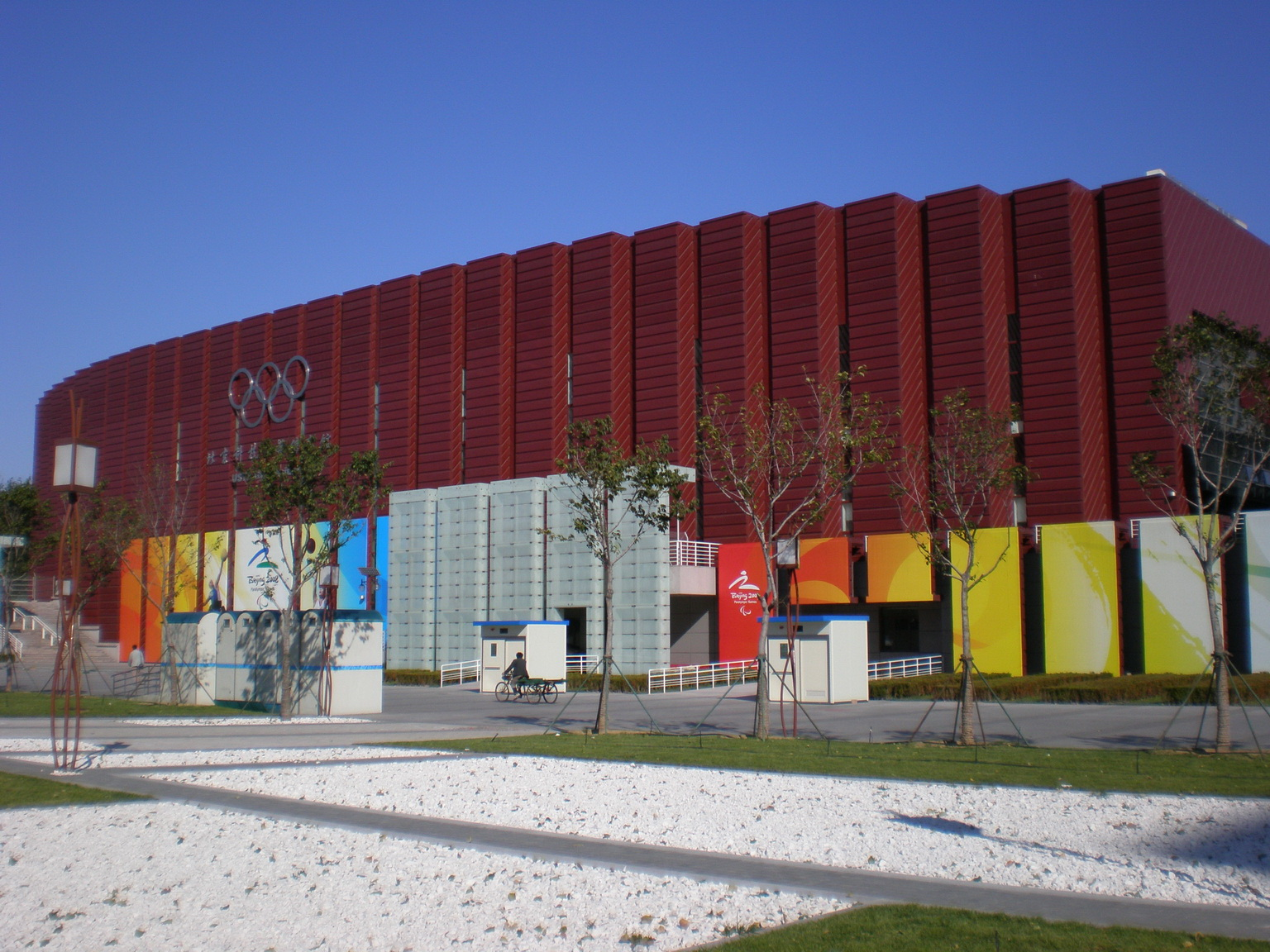
- Venue: Beijing Science and Technology University Gymnasium
- Dates: 11 August 2008
- Winning score: 1000

Medalists
1st place, gold medalist(s)		Elnur Mammadli	Azerbaijan
2nd place, silver medalist(s)		Wang Ki-Chun	South Korea
3rd place, bronze medalist(s)		Rasul Boqiev	Tajikistan
3rd place, bronze medalist(s)		Leandro Guilheiro	Brazil

The Men's 73 kg Judo competition at the 2008 Summer Olympics was held on August 11 at the Beijing Science and Technology University Gymnasium. Preliminary rounds started at 12:00 Noon CST. Repechage finals, semifinals, bouts for bronze medals and the final were held at 18:00pm CST.

This event was the third-lightest of the men's judo weight classes, limiting competitors to a maximum of 73 kilograms of body mass. Like all other judo events, bouts lasted five minutes. If the bout was still tied at the end, it was extended for another five-minute, sudden-death period; if neither judoka scored during that period, the match is decided by the judges. The tournament bracket consisted of a single-elimination contest culminating in a gold medal match. There was also a repechage to determine the winners of the two bronze medals. Each judoka who had lost to a semifinalist competed in the repechage. The two judokas who lost in the semifinals faced the winner of the opposite half of the bracket's repechage in bronze medal bouts.

== Qualifying athletes ==
Mat	Athlete	Country
1	Nicholas Tritton	Canada
1	João Pina	Portugal
1	Yusuke Kanamaru	Japan
1	Ali Maloumat	Iran
1	Krzysztof Wiłkomirski	Poland
1	Vsevolods Zelonijs	Latvia
1	Ryan Reser	United States
1	Dashdavaa Gantumur	Mongolia
1	David Kevkhishvili	Georgia
1	Sergiu Toma	Moldova
1	Ronald Girones	Cuba
1	Kim Chol-su	North Korea
1	Amar Meridja	Algeria
1	Konstantin Semenov	Belarus
1	Elnur Mammadli	Azerbaijan
1	Dirk van Tichelt	Belgium
2	Rasul Boqiev	Tajikistan
2	Eric Kibanza	Democratic Republic of the Congo
2	Gennadiy Bilodid	Ukraine
2	Salamu Mezhidov	Russia
2	Dennis Iverson	Australia
2	Sezer Huysuz	Turkey
2	Si Rijigawa	China
2	Richard Leon Vizcaya	Venezuela
2	Jaromír Ježek	Czech Republic
2	Shokir Muminov	Uzbekistan
2	Wang Ki-chun	South Korea
2	Rinat Ibragimov	Kazakhstan
2	Saeed Al Qubaisi	United Arab Emirates
2	Marlon August	South Africa
2	Mariano Bertolotti	Argentina
2	Leandro Guilheiro	Brazil

== Tournament results ==
=== Final ===
The gold and silver medalists were determined by the final match of the main single-elimination bracket.

Final
1	Elnur Mammadli (AZE)	1000
2	Wang Ki-Chun (KOR)	0000

=== Mat 1 ===
Round of 32
Nicholas Tritton (CAN)	0000
João Pina (POR)	0010
Yusuke Kanamaru (JPN)	0001
Ali Maloumat (IRI)	1001
Krzysztof Wiłkomirski (POL)	0020
Vsevolods Zelonijs (LAT)	0010
Ryan Reser (USA)	0100
Dashdavaa Gantumur (MGL)	0111
David Kevkhishvili (GEO)	0021
Sergiu Toma (MDA)	0010
Ronald Girones (CUB)	0001
Kim Chol Su (PRK)	1000
Amar Meridja (ALG)	0010
Konstantin Semenov (BLR)	0102
Elnur Mammadli (AZE)	1000
Dirk van Tichelt (BEL)	0000

Round of 16
João Pina (POR)	0001
Ali Maloumat (IRI)	0111
Krzysztof Wiłkomirski (POL)	0010
Dashdavaa Gantumur (MGL)	0012
David Kevkhishvili (GEO)	0110
Kim Chol Su (PRK)	0111
Konstantin Semenov (BLR)	0001
Elnur Mammadli (AZE)	1001

Quarter Finals
Ali Maloumat (IRI)	1100
Dashdavaa Gantumur (MGL)	0010
Kim Chol Su (PRK)	0000
Elnur Mammadli (AZE)	0200

Semi Finals
Ali Maloumat (IRI)	0000
Elnur Mammadli (AZE)	1000

=== Mat 2 ===
Round of 32
Rasul Boqiev (TJK)	0210
Eric Kibanza (COD)	0000
Gennadiy Bilodid (UKR)	1000
Salamu Mezhidov (RUS)	0000
Dennis Iverson (AUS)	0000
Sezer Huysuz (TUR)	1000
Si Rijigawa (CHN)	0001
Richard Leon Vizcaya (VEN)	0000
Jaromír Ježek (CZE)	0001
Shokir Muminov (UZB)	1000
Wang Ki-Chun (KOR)	1011
Rinat Ibragimov (KAZ)	0000
Saeed Al Qubaisi (UAE)	0000
Marlon August (RSA)	1000
Mariano Bertolotti (ARG)	0010
Leandro Guilheiro (BRA)	0100

Round of 16
Rasul Boqiev (TJK)	1000
Gennadiy Bilodid (UKR)	0000
Sezer Huysuz (TUR)	0001
Si Rijigawa (CHN)	0010
Shokir Muminov (UZB)	0000
Wang Ki-Chun (KOR)	1100
Marlon August (RSA)	0000
Leandro Guilheiro (BRA)	1001

Quarter Finals
Rasul Boqiev (TJK)	1110
Si Rijigawa (CHN)	0001
Wang Ki-Chun (KOR)	0100
Leandro Guilheiro (BRA)	0000

Semi Finals
Rasul Boqiev (TJK)	0001
Wang Ki-Chun (KOR)	0010

=== Repechage ===
Those judoka eliminated in earlier rounds by the four semifinalists of the main bracket advanced to the repechage. These matches determined the two bronze medalists for the event.

First round
Kanamaru (JPN)	0011
Pina (POR)	0010
van Tichelt (BEL)	1021
Semenov (BLR)	0020
Kibanza (COD)	0001
Bilodid (UKR)	0011
Ibragimov (KAZ)	0001
Muminov (UZB)	1010

Second round
Gantumur (MGL)	0000
Kanamaru (JPN)	0100
Kim (PRK)	0000
van Tichelt (BEL)	1011
Si (CHN)	0000
Bilodid (UKR)	0001
Guilheiro (BRA)	1000
Muminov (UZB)	0000

Third round
Kanamaru (JPN)	0000
van Tichelt (BEL)	0211
Bilodid (UKR)	0001
Guilheiro (BRA)	1000

Bronze medal finals
Boqiev (TJK)	0011
van Tichelt (BEL)	0000
Maloumat (IRI)	0000
Guilheiro (BRA)	1000
