= Gantömöriin Dashdavaa =

Mongolian Olympic judoka

Personal information
- Nationality: Mongolia
- Born: 8 January 1981 (age 45) Ulaanbaatar, Mongolia
- Height: 1.69 m (5 ft 6 1/2 in)
- Weight: 73 kg (161 lb)

Sport
- Sport: Judo
- Event: 73 kg
Medal record
Men's judo
Representing Mongolia
Asian Games
Bronze medal – third place	2002 Busan	66 kg
Asian Championships
Silver medal – second place	2003 Jeju City	66 kg
Silver medal – second place	2004 Almaty	66 kg
Bronze medal – third place	2008 Jeju City	73 kg

Gantömöriin Dashdavaa (also Dashdavaa Gantumur, Mongolian: Гантөмөрийн Дашдаваа; born January 8, 1981, in Ulaanbaatar) is a Mongolian judoka, who played for the lightweight category. He won a bronze medal for the 66 kg class at the 2002 Asian Games in Busan, South Korea. He also captured two silver medals in the same division at the 2003 Asian Judo Championships in Jeju City, and at the 2004 Asian Judo Championships in Almaty, losing out to South Korea's Jung Bu-Kyung and Kazakhstan's Muratbek Kipshakbayev, respectively.

Dashdavaa made his official debut for the 2004 Summer Olympics in Athens, where he competed for the men's half-lightweight class (66 kg). He defeated Greece's Giorgi Vazagashvili in the first preliminary round, before losing out his next match, by an ippon (full point) and a tomoe nage (circle throw), to Japan's Masato Uchishiba. Dashdavaa also qualified for the repechage rounds, but lost again by an ippon and a kuchiki taoshi (single leg takedown) to Argentina's Jorge Lencina.

At the 2008 Summer Olympics in Beijing, Dashdavaa switched to a heavier class by competing in the men's lightweight division. He defeated United States' Ryan Reser and Poland's Krzysztof Wiłkomirski in the preliminary rounds, before losing out the quarterfinal match, by an ippon and an uchi mata (inner thigh throw), to Iran's Ali Maloumat. Because his opponent advanced further into the semi-finals, Dashdavaa offered another shot for the bronze medal by entering the repechage rounds. Unfortunately, he finished only in ninth place, after losing out the second repechage bout to Japan's Yusuke Kanamaru, who successfully scored a waza-ari (half-point) and an o goshi (full hip throw), at the end of the five-minute period.
