= Judo at the 2004 Summer Olympics – Men's 73 kg =

Judo competition

Men's 73 kg at the Games of the XXVIII Olympiad
- Venue: Ano Liossia Olympic Hall
- Dates: 16 August 2004
- Competitors: 34 from 34 nations
- Winning score: 1021

Medalists
1st place, gold medalist(s)		Lee Won-hee	South Korea
2nd place, silver medalist(s)		Vitaliy Makarov	Russia
3rd place, bronze medalist(s)		Leandro Guilheiro	Brazil
3rd place, bronze medalist(s)		Jimmy Pedro	United States

Men's 73 kg competition in judo at the 2004 Summer Olympics was held on August 16 at the Ano Liossia Olympic Hall.

This event was the third-lightest of the men's judo weight classes, limiting competitors to a maximum of 73 kilograms of body mass. Like all other judo events, bouts lasted five minutes. If the bout was still tied at the end, it was extended for another five-minute, sudden-death period; if neither judoka scored during that period, the match is decided by the judges. The tournament bracket consisted of a single-elimination contest culminating in a gold medal match. There was also a repechage to determine the winners of the two bronze medals. Each judoka who had lost to a semifinalist competed in the repechage. The two judokas who lost in the semifinals faced the winner of the opposite half of the bracket's repechage in bronze medal bouts.

== Schedule ==
All times are Greece Standard Time (UTC+2)

Date	Time	Round
Monday, 16 August 2004	10:30; 13:00; 17:00	Preliminaries; Repechage; Final

== Qualifying athletes ==
Mat	Athlete	Country
1	Daniel Fernandes	France
1	Xie Jianhua	China
1	Rubert Martinez	Cuba
1	Yoel Razvozov	Israel
1	Andrew Collett	Australia
1	Krzysztof Wiłkomirski	Poland
1	Leandro Guilheiro	Brazil
1	Kiyoshi Uematsu	Spain
1	Ernst Laraque	Haiti
1	Masahiro Takamatsu	Japan
1	David Kevkhishvili	Georgia
1	Vitaliy Makarov	Russia
1	Lavrentis Alexanidis	Greece
1	Egamnazar Akbarov	Uzbekistan
1	Bernard Mvondo-Etoga	Cameroon
1	Vsevolods Zeļonijs	Latvia
1	Damdiny Süldbayar	Mongolia
2	Jimmy Pedro	United States
2	Sagdat Sadykov	Kazakhstan
2	Rodrigo Lucenti	Argentina
2	Lee Won-hee	South Korea
2	Anatoly Laryukov	Belarus
2	Akapei Latu	Tonga
2	Noureddine Yagoubi	Algeria
2	Haitham Awad	Egypt
2	Gennadiy Bilodid	Ukraine
2	Hamed Malekmohammadi	Iran
2	Sašo Jereb	Slovenia
2	Victor Bivol	Moldova
2	Richard León	Venezuela
2	João Neto	Portugal
2	Christodoulos Christodoulides	Cyprus
2	Claudiu Baştea	Romania
2	Bourama Mariko	Mali

== Tournament results ==
=== Final ===
Final
1	Vitaliy Makarov (RUS)	0001
2	Lee Won-hee (KOR)	1021

=== Mat 1 ===
Round of 64
Leandro Guilheiro (BRA)	0010
Kiyoshi Uematsu (ESP)	0000

Round of 32
Daniel Fernandes (FRA)	0210
Xie Jianhua (CHN)	0101
Rubert Martínez (CUB)	0000
Yoel Razvozov (ISR)	1000
Andrew Collett (AUS)	0001
Krzysztof Wiłkomirski (POL)	1001
Leandro Guilheiro (BRA)	1001
Ernst Laraque (HAI)	0000
Masahiro Takamatsu (JPN)	0010
David Kevkhishvili (GEO)	0101
Vitaliy Makarov (RUS)	1000
Lavrentis Alexanidis (GRE)	0000
Egamnazar Akbarov (UZB)	0000
Bernard Mvondo-Etoga (CMR)	0011
Vsevolods Zeļonijs (LAT)	0011
Damdiny Süldbayar (MGL)	1110

Round of 16
Daniel Fernandes (FRA)	1001
Yoel Razvozov (ISR)	0001
Krzysztof Wiłkomirski (POL)	0011
Leandro Guilheiro (BRA)	0110
David Kevkhishvili (GEO)	0000
Vitaliy Makarov (RUS)	0221
Bernard Mvondo-Etoga (CMR)	0001
Damdiny Süldbayar (MGL)	0010

Quarterfinals
Daniel Fernandes (FRA)	0101
Leandro Guilheiro (BRA)	0010
Vitaliy Makarov (RUS)	0120
Damdiny Süldbayar (MGL)	0000

Semifinals
Daniel Fernandes (FRA)	0001
Vitaliy Makarov (RUS)	1000

=== Mat 2 ===
Round of 64
Jimmy Pedro (USA)	1001
Sagdat Sadykov (KAZ)	0000

Round of 32
Jimmy Pedro (USA)	1012
Rodrigo Lucenti (ARG)	0000
Lee Won-hee (KOR)	0021
Anatoly Laryukov (BLR)	0011
Akapei Latu (TGA)	0000
Noureddine Yagoubi (ALG)	1111
Haitham Awad (EGY)
Gennadiy Bilodid (UKR)	WO
Hamed Malekmohammadi (IRI)	1000
Sašo Jereb (SLO)	0010
Victor Bivol (MDA)	1001
Richard León (VEN)	0000
João Neto (POR)	0011
Christodoulos Christodoulides (CYP)	0010
Claudiu Baştea (ROU)	0210
Bourama Mariko (MLI)	0000

Round of 16
Jimmy Pedro (USA)	0010
Lee Won-hee (KOR)	1100
Noureddine Yagoubi (ALG)	0000
Gennadiy Bilodid (UKR)	1000
Hamed Malekmohammadi (IRI)	0000
Victor Bivol (MDA)	1000
João Neto (POR)	1021
Claudiu Baştea (ROU)	0001

Quarterfinals
Lee Won-hee (KOR)	1000
Gennadiy Bilodid (UKR)	0000
Victor Bivol (MDA)	1000
João Neto (POR)	0000

Semifinals
Lee Won-hee (KOR)	1000
Victor Bivol (MDA)	0100

=== Repechage ===
Those judoka eliminated in earlier rounds by the four semifinalists of the main bracket advanced to the repechage. These matches determined the two bronze medalists for the event.

First round
Xie Jianhua (CHN)	0000
Yoel Razvozov (ISR)	1100
Lavrentis Alexanidis (GRE)	0001
David Kevkhishvili (GEO)	1001
Anatoly Laryukov (BLR)	0000
Jimmy Pedro (USA)	0001
Richard León (VEN)	0000
Hamed Malekmohammadi (IRI)	1010

Second round
Leandro Guilheiro (BRA)	1001
Yoel Razvozov (ISR)	0020
Damdiny Süldbayar (MGL)	0010
David Kevkhishvili (GEO)	0011
Gennadiy Bilodid (UKR)	0001
Jimmy Pedro (USA)	0100
João Neto (POR)	1110
Hamed Malekmohammadi (IRI)	0020

Third round
Leandro Guilheiro (BRA)	0001
David Kevkhishvili (GEO)	0000
Jimmy Pedro (USA)	1010
João Neto (POR)	0000

Bronze medal finals
Victor Bivol (MDA)	0000
Leandro Guilheiro (BRA)	0200
Daniel Fernandes (FRA)	0001
Jimmy Pedro (USA)	1110
