= Venezuela at the 2004 Summer Olympics =

- IOC code: VEN
- NOC: Venezuelan Olympic Committee
- Website: cov.com.ve (in Spanish)

in Athens
- Competitors: 48 in 15 sports
- Flag bearer: Julio César Luna
- Medals Ranked 68th: Gold 0 Silver 0 Bronze 2 Total 2

Summer Olympics appearances (overview)
- 1948; 1952; 1956; 1960; 1964; 1968; 1972; 1976; 1980; 1984; 1988; 1992; 1996; 2000; 2004; 2008; 2012; 2016; 2020; 2024; 2028

Venezuela competed at the 2004 Summer Olympics in Athens, Greece, from 13 to 29 August 2004. This was the nation's fifteenth consecutive appearance at the Olympics, since its debut in 1948. A total of 48 athletes, 33 men and 15 women, competed in 15 sports.

Venezuela left Athens with its first Olympic medal since 1984 and eighth overall in history. It was awarded to weightlifter Israel José Rubio, who earned the bronze in the men's 62 kg class.

== Medalists ==
Medal	Name	Sport	Event	Date
Bronze	Israel José Rubio	Weightlifting	Men's 62 kg	August 16
Bronze	Adriana Carmona	Taekwondo	Women's +67 kg	August 28

== Athletics ==
Venezuelan athletes have so far achieved qualifying standards in the following athletics events (up to a maximum of 3 athletes in each event at the 'A' Standard, and 1 at the 'B' Standard).

Key

- Note – Ranks given for track events are within the athlete's heat only
- Q = Qualified for the next round
- q = Qualified for the next round as a fastest loser or, in field events, by position without achieving the qualifying target
- NR = National record
- N/A = Round not applicable for the event
- Bye = Athlete not required to compete in round

Men
Track & road events

Athlete	Event	Heat		Semifinal		Final	
Athlete	Event	Result	Rank	Result	Rank	Result	Rank
Luis Fonseca	Marathon	—N/a				DNF	
Freddy González	5000 m	13:42.44	13	—N/a		Did not advance	
Luis Luna	400 m	47.92	6	Did not advance			

Field events

Athlete	Event	Qualification		Final	
Athlete	Event	Distance	Position	Distance	Position
Víctor Castillo	Long jump	7.98	15	Did not advance	
Manuel Fuenmayor	Javelin throw	72.26	30	Did not advance	

== Boxing ==
Venezuela sent seven boxers to Athens. Five of them lost their first matches, while the two in the heavier weight classes each won their first round (one by walkover, however) before falling in their second match.

Athlete	Event	Round of 32	Round of 16	Quarterfinals	Semifinals	Final	
Athlete	Event	Opposition Result	Opposition Result	Opposition Result	Opposition Result	Opposition Result	Rank
Miguel Ángel Miranda	Light flyweight	Bartelemí (CUB); L RSC	Did not advance				
Jonny Mendoza	Flyweight	Bye	Ambunda (NAM); L 19–39	Did not advance			
Alexander Espinoza	Bantamweight	Bye	Kooner (CAN); L 20–37	Did not advance			
Patrick López	Light welterweight	di Rocco (ITA); L 30–37	Did not advance				
Jean Carlos Prada	Welterweight	Husanov (UZB); L 20–33	Did not advance				
Edgar Muñoz	Light heavyweight	Šivolija (CRO); W 31–23	Aripgadjiev (BLR); L 10–18	Did not advance			
Wilmer Vásquez	Heavyweight	—N/a	Ergezen (TUR); W WO	Solís (CUB); L 4–24	Did not advance		

== Cycling ==
=== Road ===
Unai Etxebarría was the most notable Venezuelan cyclist at the 2004 Olympics, as he joined a leading group of 10 at the 146 kilometre mark of the men's road race, later attacked this group, leading to the formation of a group of 6 at the start of lap 13 (160 kilometres) before being caught by the peloton at the 185 kilometre mark, with Etxebarría finishing in the middle of the pack.

Athlete	Event	Time	Rank
José Chacón Díaz	Men's road race	Did not finish	
Unai Etxebarría	Men's road race	5:41:56	34

=== Track ===
Sprint

Athlete	Event	Qualification		Round 1	Repechage 1	Quarterfinals	Semifinals	Final	
Athlete	Event	Time Speed (km/h)	Rank	Opposition Time Speed (km/h)	Opposition Time Speed (km/h)	Opposition Time Speed (km/h)	Opposition Time Speed (km/h)	Opposition Time Speed (km/h)	Rank
Daniela Larreal	Women's sprint	11.597; 62.085	8	Hijgenaar (NED); W 11.849; 60.764	Bye	Muenzer (CAN); L, L	Did not advance	5th place final Tsylinskaya (BLR); Meinke (GER); Krupeckaitė (LTU); L DSQ	8

== Diving ==
Venezuela has qualified a single diver.

Men

Athlete	Events	Preliminaries		Semifinals		Final	
Athlete	Events	Points	Rank	Points	Rank	Points	Rank
Ramon Fumado	3 m springboard	410.97	14 Q	605.79	17	Did not advance	

== Fencing ==
Venezuela has qualified four fencers.

Men

Athlete	Event	Round of 64	Round of 32	Round of 16	Quarterfinal	Semifinal	Final / BM	
Athlete	Event	Opposition Score	Opposition Score	Opposition Score	Opposition Score	Opposition Score	Opposition Score	Rank
Silvio Fernández	Individual épée	Bye	Xie Yj (CHN); W 15–13	Zhao G (CHN); W 15–12	Fischer (SUI); L 13–15	Did not advance		
Carlos Rodríguez	Individual foil	Anwar (EGY); W 15–7	Sanzo (ITA); L 7–15	Did not advance				

Women

Athlete	Event	Round of 32	Round of 16	Quarterfinal	Semifinal	Final / BM	
Athlete	Event	Opposition Score	Opposition Score	Opposition Score	Opposition Score	Opposition Score	Rank
Mariana González	Individual foil	Smart (USA); W 14–2	Vezzali (ITA); L 4–15	Did not advance			
Alejandra Benítez	Individual sabre	Zhang Y (CHN); L 9–15	Did not advance				

== Judo ==
Venezuelan has qualified nine judoka (five men and four women).

Men

Athlete	Event	Round of 32	Round of 16	Quarterfinals	Semifinals	Repechage 1	Repechage 2	Repechage 3	Final / BM	
Athlete	Event	Opposition Result	Opposition Result	Opposition Result	Opposition Result	Opposition Result	Opposition Result	Opposition Result	Opposition Result	Rank
Reiver Alvarenga	−60 kg	Darbelet (FRA); L 0002–0010	Did not advance							
Ludwig Ortíz	−66 kg	Arencibia (CUB); L 0010–0101	Did not advance			Young (AUS); W 1000–0000	Pina (POR); L 0001–0030	Did not advance		
Richard León	−73 kg	Bivol (MDA); L 0000–1001	Did not advance			Malekmohammadi (IRI); L 0000–1010	Did not advance			
José Gregorio Camacho	−90 kg	Costa (ARG); L 0000–1101	Did not advance							
Leonel Wilfredo Ruíz	+100 kg	Papaioannou (GRE); L 0000–1010	Did not advance							

Women

Athlete	Event	Round of 32	Round of 16	Quarterfinals	Semifinals	Repechage 1	Repechage 2	Repechage 3	Final / BM	
Athlete	Event	Opposition Result	Opposition Result	Opposition Result	Opposition Result	Opposition Result	Opposition Result	Opposition Result	Opposition Result	Rank
Flor Velázquez	−52 kg	Bye	Singleton (GBR); L 0000–0010	Did not advance						
Rudymar Fleming	−57 kg	Kusakabe (JPN); L 0000–1000	Did not advance							
Keivi Pinto	−78 kg	Nasiga (FIJ); W 0021–0000	Anno (JPN); L 0000–1011	Did not advance		Bye	Morico (ITA); L 0000–1001	Did not advance		
Giovanna Blanco	+78 kg	Bye	Bisseni (FRA); W 0002–0000	Beltrán (JPN); L 0000–1001	Did not advance	Bye	Bryant (GBR); W 0111–0020	Yahyaoui (TUN); L 0000–1012	Did not advance	

== Sailing ==
Venezuela has qualified a single boat in men's mistral.

Men

Athlete	Event	Race											Net points	Final rank
Athlete	Event	1	2	3	4	5	6	7	8	9	10	M*	Net points	Final rank
Carlos Julio Flores	Mistral	25	~~30~~	26	11	16	25	28	27	27	24	23	232	25

== Shooting ==
Women

Athlete	Event	Qualification		Final	
Athlete	Event	Points	Rank	Points	Rank
Francis Gorrin	10 m air pistol	534	37	Did not advance	
Francis Gorrin	25 m pistol	358	41	Did not advance	

== Swimming ==
Venezuelan swimmers earned qualifying standards in the following events (up to a maximum of 2 swimmers in each event at the A-standard time, and 1 at the B-standard time):

Men

Athlete	Event	Heat		Semifinal		Final	
Athlete	Event	Time	Rank	Time	Rank	Time	Rank
Ricardo Monasterio	400 m freestyle	3:54.41	23	—N/a		Did not advance	
Ricardo Monasterio	1500 m freestyle	15:20.89	15	—N/a		Did not advance	
Luis Rojas	50 m freestyle	DNS		Did not advance			
Luis Rojas	100 m freestyle	49.69 NR	14 Q	49.85	15	Did not advance	
Luis Rojas	100 m butterfly	54.58	36	Did not advance			
Albert Subirats	200 m freestyle	1:53.11	38	Did not advance			

Women

Athlete	Event	Heat		Semifinal		Final	
Athlete	Event	Time	Rank	Time	Rank	Time	Rank
Arlene Semeco	50 m freestyle	26.20	27	Did not advance			
Arlene Semeco	100 m freestyle	57.04	29	Did not advance			

== Table tennis ==
Athlete	Event	Round 1	Round 2	Round 3	Round 4	Quarterfinals	Semifinals	Final / BM	
Athlete	Event	Opposition Result	Opposition Result	Opposition Result	Opposition Result	Opposition Result	Opposition Result	Opposition Result	Rank
Fabiola Ramos	Women's singles	Negrisoli (ITA); L 1–4	Did not advance						
Luisana Pérez; Fabiola Ramos	Women's doubles	Rodríguez / Vega (CHI); W 4–3	Banh / Gao (USA); L 0–4	Did not advance					

== Taekwondo ==
Athlete	Event	Round of 16	Quarterfinals	Semifinals	Repechage 1	Repechage 2	Final / BM	
Athlete	Event	Opposition Result	Opposition Result	Opposition Result	Opposition Result	Opposition Result	Opposition Result	Rank
Luis Alberto García	Men's −68 kg	Silva (BRA); L 5–6	Did not advance					
Luis Noguera	Men's +80 kg	Zrouri (MAR); L 5–8	Did not advance					
Dalia Contreras	Women's −49 kg	Arusi (ISR); W 5–1	Gonda (CAN); L 2–3	Did not advance				
Adriana Carmona	Women's +67 kg	Stevenson (GBR); W 8–8 SUP	Chen Z (CHN); L 5–7	Did not advance	Okamoto (JPN); W 5–2	Dawani (JOR); W 11–8	Falavigna (BRA); W 7–4	3rd place, bronze medalist(s)

== Tennis ==
Venezuela has qualified a spot in the women's tennis.

Athlete	Event	Round of 64	Round of 32	Round of 16	Quarterfinals	Semifinals	Final / BM	
Athlete	Event	Opposition Score	Opposition Score	Opposition Score	Opposition Score	Opposition Score	Opposition Score	Rank
María Vento-Kabchi	Women's singles	Kremer (LUX); W 6–3, 6–4	Henin-Hardenne (BEL); L 2–6, 1–6	Did not advance				

== Triathlon ==
Venezuela has qualified a single athlete in men's triathlon.

Athlete	Event	Swim (1.5 km)	Trans 1	Bike (40 km)	Trans 2	Run (10 km)	Total Time	Rank
Gilberto González	Men's	18:24	0:19	1:05:29	0:19	35:19	1:59:12.20	36

== Weightlifting ==
Venezuela has qualified three men in weightlifting.

Athlete	Event	Snatch		Clean & Jerk		Total	Rank
Athlete	Event	Result	Rank	Result	Rank	Total	Rank
Israel José Rubio	Men's −62 kg	132.5	=6	162.5	3	295	3rd place, bronze medalist(s)
Octavio Mejías	Men's −77 kg	155	=10	187.5	=11	295	12
Julio César Luña	Men's −94 kg	170	=12	220	=1	390	5

== Wrestling ==
Key

- VT – Victory by Fall.
- PP – Decision by Points – the loser with technical points.
- PO – Decision by Points – the loser without technical points.

Men's Greco-Roman

Athlete	Event	Elimination Pool			Quarterfinal	Semifinal	Final / BM	
Athlete	Event	Opposition Result	Opposition Result	Rank	Opposition Result	Opposition Result	Opposition Result	Rank
Rafael Barreno	−120 kg	Galstyan (ARM); L 1–3 ^{PP}	Szczepaniak (FRA); L 0–4 ^{ST}	3	Did not advance			16

Women's freestyle

Athlete	Event	Elimination Pool				Classification	Semifinal	Final / BM	
Athlete	Event	Opposition Result	Opposition Result	Opposition Result	Rank	Opposition Result	Opposition Result	Opposition Result	Rank
Mayelis Caripá	−48 kg	Oorzhak (RUS); L 0–3 ^{PO}	Li H (CHN); L 0–4 ^{ST}	Miranda (USA); L 1–4 ^{SP}	4	Did not advance			12

== See also ==
- Venezuela at the 2003 Pan American Games
- Venezuela at the 2004 Summer Paralympics
