= Richard Leon (judoka) =

Venezuelan judoka (born 1976)

Personal information
- Full name: Richard Leon Vizcaya
- Nationality: Venezuela
- Born: 7 January 1976 (age 50) Caracas, Distrito Capital, Venezuela
- Height: 1.80 m (5 ft 11 in)
- Weight: 73 kg (161 lb)

Sport
- Sport: Judo
- Event: 73 kg
Medal record
Men's judo
Representing Venezuela
Pan American Championships
Bronze medal – third place	2006 Buenos Aires	73 kg
Bronze medal – third place	2008 Miami	81 kg

Richard Leon Vizcaya (born January 7, 1976, in Caracas, Distrito Capital) is a Venezuelan judoka, who played for the lightweight category. He won two bronze medals for the 73 and 81 kg classes at the 2006 Pan American Judo Championships in Buenos Aires, Argentina, and at the 2008 Pan American Judo Championships in Miami, Florida.

Leon made his official debut for the 2004 Summer Olympics in Athens, where he lost the first preliminary match of men's lightweight class (73 kg), with an ippon and an osoto otoshi (big outer drop), to Moldova's Victor Bivol. Because his opponent advanced further into the semi-finals, Leon was offered another shot for the bronze medal by entering the repechage bouts, but was defeated in the first round by Iran's Hamed Malekmohammadi, who successfully scored an ippon and a sukui-nage (double leg takedown), at one minute and fifty-four seconds.

At the 2008 Summer Olympics in Beijing, Leon competed for the second time in men's 73 kg class. Leon lost the first preliminary match, by a koka and a golden score, to China's Si Rijigawa, although he received a penalty for false attack.
