= Rodrigo Lucenti =

Argentine judoka (born 1978)

Personal information
- Full name: Daniel Rodrigo Lucenti
- Nationality: Argentina
- Born: 10 May 1978 (age 48) San Martín, Santa Fe, Argentina
- Height: 1.70 m (5 ft 7 in)
- Weight: 73 kg (161 lb)

Sport
- Sport: Judo
- Event: 73 kg

Daniel Rodrigo Lucenti (born 10 May 1978 in San Martín, Santa Fe) is an Argentine judoka, who competed in the men's lightweight category. He held a 2002 Argentine senior title for his own division, picked up a total of eight medals in his career, including two from the Pan American Judo Championships, and also competed with his brother Emmanuel Lucenti for the Argentine judo squad at the 2004 Summer Olympics.

Lucenti qualified for the Argentine squad in the men's lightweight class (73 kg) at the 2004 Summer Olympics in Athens, by placing third and receiving a berth from the Pan American Championships in Margarita Island, Venezuela. He lost his opening match to U.S. judoka and eventual bronze medalist Jimmy Pedro, who successfully scored an ippon and gripped him with a yoko shiho gatame (side four quarter) hold forty-five seconds before the clock expired.
