= Vitaly Makarov =

Russian judoka

Personal information
- Native name: Виталий Валерьевич Макаров
- Born: 23 June 1974 (age 52) Teguldet, Tomsk Oblast, Russian SFSR, Soviet Union
- Occupation: Judoka
- Height: 174 cm (5 ft 9 in)

Sport
- Country: Russia
- Sport: Judo
- Weight class: –73 kg

Achievements and titles
- Olympic Games: (silver) (2004)
- World Champ.: (2001)
- European Champ.: (silver) (2000)
Medal record
Men's judo
Representing Russia
Olympic Games
Silver medal – second place	2004 Athens	‍–‍73 kg
World Championships
Gold medal – first place	2001 Munich	‍–‍73 kg
Silver medal – second place	1999 Birmingham	‍–‍73 kg
Bronze medal – third place	2003 Osaka	‍–‍73 kg
European Championships
Silver medal – second place	2000 Wrocław	‍–‍73 kg
Bronze medal – third place	1999 Bratislava	‍–‍73 kg
World Juniors Championships
Gold medal – first place	1994 Cairo	‍–‍71 kg
European Junior Championships
Silver medal – second place	1994 Lisbon	‍–‍71 kg

Profile at external databases
- IJF: 388
- JudoInside.com: 586
- Updated on 30 May 2023

Vitaly Valeryevich Makarov (Russian: Виталий Валерьевич Макаров; born 23 June 1974 in Teguldet, Tomsk Oblast, Soviet Union) is a Russian judoka who competed in the men's lightweight category. He was a 2004 Olympic silver medalist, 2001 World Champion, and earned medals in several other international tournaments. He was a 1994 World Junior Champion and has been a coach on the Russian national judo team.

== Biography ==
Makarov is considered to be one of the best Russian judokas. He started judo when is father offered to take him to practice, who believed he had talent at the sport. At the 1994 Junior World Judo Championships in Cairo, Egypt, Makarov won his first international competition, and later that year got a silver medal at the Junior European Championships. In Birmingham in 1999, he missed his chance to become World Champion after losing to Jimmy Pedro of the United States in the final. In the 2000 Summer Olympics he was defeated in the first match by Askhat Shakharov of Kazakhstan. But in 2001 Makarov famously defeated Yusuke Kanamaru of Japan to become World Champion. He won a silver medal in the lightweight (73 kg) division at the 2004 Summer Olympics after being defeated by Lee Won-hee of South Korea in the final due to competing with an injury. Since 2006 he has been coaching the Russian judo team, and trained other Russian judoka who competed at the 2008, 2012, 2016 Summer Olympics. He is also a coach on the Russian team for the 2020 Summer Olympics in Tokyo.

== Personal life ==
He is married to Carmen Calvo, 3rd degree black belt, an official of the Spanish Judo Federation.

== Achievements ==
Year	Tournament	Place	Weight class
2004	Olympic Games	2nd	Lightweight (73 kg)
2003	World Judo Championships	3rd	Lightweight (73 kg)
2001	World Judo Championships	1st	Lightweight (73 kg)
2000	European Judo Championships	2nd	Lightweight (73 kg)
1999	World Judo Championships	2nd	Lightweight (73 kg)
1999	European Judo Championships	3rd	Lightweight (73 kg)
1998	European Judo Championships	5th	Lightweight (73 kg)
1994	Junior European Judo Championships	2nd	Lightweight (71 kg)
1994	Junior World Judo Championships	1st	Lightweight (71 kg)
