= Bilodid =

Bilodid (Ukrainian: Білодід) is a Ukrainian surname. Notable people with this surname include:

- Daria Bilodid (born 2000), Ukrainian judoka
- Gennadiy Bilodid (born 1977), Ukrainian judoka
