= Judo at the 2002 Asian Games – Men's 73 kg =

Judo competition

Men's 73 kg at the 2002 Asian Games
- Venue: Gudeok Gymnasium
- Date: 2 October 2002
- Competitors: 15 from 15 nations

Medalists
gold medal	Choi Yong-sin	South Korea
silver medal	Yusuke Kanamaru	Japan
bronze medal	Hamed Malekmohammadi	Iran
bronze medal	Egamnazar Akbarov	Uzbekistan

The men's 73 kilograms (Lightweight) competition at the 2002 Asian Games in Busan was held on 2 October at the Gudeok Gymnasium.

== Schedule ==
All times are Korea Standard Time (UTC+09:00)

Date	Time	Event
Wednesday, 2 October 2002	14:00	1 round
Wednesday, 2 October 2002	14:00	2 round
Wednesday, 2 October 2002	14:00	Repechage 1 round
Wednesday, 2 October 2002	14:00	Repechage 2 round
Wednesday, 2 October 2002	14:00	Semifinals
Wednesday, 2 October 2002	18:00	Finals

== Results ==
=== Main bracket ===
1 round
Egamnazar Akbarov (UZB)	0002
Askhat Shakharov (KAZ)	0000
Choi Yong-sin (KOR)	0200
Gilbert Ramirez (PHI)	0000
Hamed Malekmohammadi (IRI)	1000
Hari Kumar Lama (NEP)	0000
Yusuke Kanamaru (JPN)	1010
Sherali Bozorov (TJK)	0001
Waleed Hanafi (QAT)	0000
Damdiny Süldbayar (MGL)	1021
Pak Chol-su (PRK)	0111
Sagdat Sadykov (KGZ)	0031
Maher Abu Rmeileh (PLE)	0000
Yan Naing Soe (MYA)	1000

2 round
Egamnazar Akbarov (UZB)	0100
Zhang Guangjun (CHN)	0010
Choi Yong-sin (KOR)	0001
Hamed Malekmohammadi (IRI)	0000
Yusuke Kanamaru (JPN)	0012
Damdiny Süldbayar (MGL)	0000
Pak Chol-su (PRK)	0220
Yan Naing Soe (MYA)	0000

Semifinals
Egamnazar Akbarov (UZB)	0001
Choi Yong-sin (KOR)	0120
Yusuke Kanamaru (JPN)	1000
Pak Chol-su (PRK)	0000

Final
Choi Yong-sin (KOR)	0001
Yusuke Kanamaru (JPN)	0000

=== Repechage ===
Repechage 1 round
Askhat Shakharov (KAZ)	1010
Zhang Guangjun (CHN)	0000
Gilbert Ramirez (PHI)	0000
Hamed Malekmohammadi (IRI)	1101
Sherali Bozorov (TJK)	0000
Damdiny Süldbayar (MGL)	0012
Sagdat Sadykov (KGZ)	0201
Yan Naing Soe (MYA)	0000

Repechage 2 round
Askhat Shakharov (KAZ)	0001
Hamed Malekmohammadi (IRI)	0101
Damdiny Süldbayar (MGL)	0031
Sagdat Sadykov (KGZ)	0010

Bronze medal match
Hamed Malekmohammadi (IRI)	0011
Pak Chol-su (PRK)	0010
Damdiny Süldbayar (MGL)	0010
Egamnazar Akbarov (UZB)	0200
