= Eric Kibanza =

Congolese judoka

Personal information
- Full name: Eric Kibanza Lundoloki
- Nationality: Democratic Republic of the Congo
- Born: 4 April 1980 (age 46) Kinshasa, Democratic Republic of the Congo
- Occupation: Judoka
- Height: 1.73 m (5 ft 8 in)
- Weight: 73 kg (161 lb)

Sport
- Sport: Judo
- Event: 73 kg

Profile at external databases
- JudoInside.com: 55190

Eric Kibanza Lundoloki (born 4 April 1980 in Kinshasa) is a DR Congolese judoka, who played for the lightweight category. Kibanza represented the Democratic Republic of the Congo at the 2008 Summer Olympics in Beijing, where he competed for the men's 73 kg class. He lost the first preliminary match to Tajikistan's Rasul Boqiev, who scored a waza-ari awasete ippon at about four minutes. Because Boqiev advanced further into the semi-finals, Kibanza offered another chance for a bronze medal by entering the repechage rounds. He was eventually beaten with a yuko by Ukraine's Gennadiy Bilodid in the first round.
