= Egamnazar Akbarov =

Uzbek judoka (born 1976)

Personal information
- Full name: Egamnazar Muftillayevich Akbarov
- Nationality: Uzbekistan
- Born: 18 July 1976 (age 49) Tashkent, Uzbek SSR, Soviet Union
- Height: 1.72 m (5 ft 7 1/2 in)
- Weight: 73 kg (161 lb)

Sport
- Sport: Judo
- Event: 73 kg
Medal record
Men's judo
Representing Uzbekistan
Asian Games
Bronze medal – third place	2002 Busan	73 kg
Asian Championships
Bronze medal – third place	2004 Almaty	73 kg
Universiade
Gold medal – first place	2001 Beijing	73 kg

Egamnazar Muftillayevich Akbarov (Uzbek: Эгамназар Муфтиллаевич Акбаров; born July 18, 1976, in Tashkent) is an Uzbek judoka, who competed in the men's lightweight category. He picked up a total of eight medals in his career, including a gold from the 2001 Summer Universiade in Beijing, China and a bronze from the 2002 Asian Games in Busan, South Korea, and represented his nation Uzbekistan in the 73-kg class at the 2004 Summer Olympics.

Akbarov made sporting headlines at the 2001 Summer Universiade in Beijing, where he threw South Korea's Choi Yong-sin in the closing seconds to grab the gold medal in the 73-kg division. When South Korea hosted the 2002 Asian Games in Busan, Akbarov missed a chance for another gold with a stunning defeat to his former rival Choi in the semifinals by the mighty commotion of the home crowd inside Gudeok Gymnasium, but redeemed himself to score a waza-ari awasete ippon victory over Mongolia's Damdiny Süldbayar for the bronze medal.

At the 2004 Summer Olympics in Athens, Akbarov qualified for the Uzbek squad in the men's lightweight class (73 kg), by placing fifth and receiving a berth from the World Championships in Osaka, Japan. In the opening round, Akbarov conceded with two shido penalties and then suffered a striking defeat on yuko points and a pacifying assault to Cameroon's Bernard Mvondo-Etoga at the end of the five-minute match.
