= Laraque =

Laraque is a surname. Notable people with the surname include:

- Ernst Laraque (born 1970), Haitian judoka
- Georges Laraque (born 1976), Canadian politician and ice hockey player
- Gustave Laraque, former ambassador of Haiti to the United States
