= James Pedro Sr. =

American judoka (born 1946)

James "Jimmy" Pedro Sr (born November 6, 1946) is a former national level judoka from the United States and an alternate for the US 1976 Olympic judo team. Jimmy Pedro started Judo at the age of 19, earning his black belt in 2 years. Jimmy won the black belt division at the 1971 Taka Invitational Tournament, and went on to win the 1972 New England AAU Tournament. He earned bronze in the 1974 Senior Nationals, and bronze in the 1974 Pan American Championships. Jimmy trained with Olympians Jimmy Martin and Pat Burris and was selected to take part in the 1975 American Team to Challenge Europe's best judoka. In the US National Championships, James earned a silver in 1978, a bronze in 1979, and a silver in 1980. In 1978, Jimmy Pedro was selected to the Black Belt Magazine Hall of Fame as a judo coach. He coached his son, Jimmy Pedro who became the first person from the U.S. to take home two Olympic medals., and went on to be selected as the 2012 US Olympic Team Assistant Coach.
