= Saeed Rashid Al Qubaisi =

Emirati judoka

Saeed Rashed Al Qubaisi
Personal information
- Nationality: United Arab Emirates
- Born: 2 December 1989 (age 36)
- Height: 1.76 m (5 ft 9 1/2 in)
- Weight: 73 kg (161 lb)

Sport
- Country: United Arab Emirates
- Sport: Judo
- Event: 73 kg
- Club: UAE Wrestling, judo & Kick Boxing Federation
- Team: Abu Dhabi Team
- Coached by: Hassan Mousa / Sergey

Achievements and titles
- Olympic finals: 2008 Summer Olympics
Medal record
Silver Medal Arab in Yemen 2006
Bronze Medal Arab in Syria 2007
Gold Medal Gulf in UAE 2007
Gold Medal Arab in Yemen 2007
Silver Medal International in Belarus 2008
Gold Medal Gulf Championship in Qatar 2012
I Represented UAE in 2008 Summer Olympics

Saeed Rashed Al-Qubaisi (Arabic: سعيد راشد القبيسي; born December 2, 1989) is an Emirati judoka and Olympian. Al-Qubaisi became the first Emirati athlete to represent his nation in a combative sport at the 2008 Summer Olympics in Beijing. He lost the first preliminary match of the men's lightweight class (73 kg) to South Africa's Marlon August. August successfully scored an ippon and a kuchiki taoshi (single leg takedown) against Al-Qubaisi in one minute and twenty-seven seconds.
