= Mariano Bertolotti =

Argentine Olympic judoka

Personal information
- Full name: Mariano Daniel Bertolotti
- Nationality: Argentina
- Born: 27 September 1982 (age 43) Buenos Aires, Argentina
- Height: 1.76 m (5 ft 9 1/2 in)
- Weight: 72 kg (159 lb)

Sport
- Sport: Judo
- Event: 73 kg

Mariano Daniel Bertolotti (born 27 September 1982 in Buenos Aires) is an Argentine judoka, who played for the lightweight category. He finished only in seventh place for his division at the 2007 Pan American Games in Rio de Janeiro, losing out to Canada's Nicholas Tritton.

Bertolotti represented Argentina at the 2008 Summer Olympics in Beijing, where he competed for the men's lightweight class (73 kg). He lost the first preliminary match, with a waza-ari (half-point), to Brazil's Leandro Guilheiro, who eventually won the bronze medal in this event.
