= Judo at the 2001 Jeux de la Francophonie =

Judo competition

Judo Judo at the 2001 Jeux de la Francophonie
- Venue: Robert Guertin Centre
- Location: Gatineau, Quebec, Canada
- Dates: 15–17 July 2001

Competition at external databases
- Links: JudoInside

At the 2001 Jeux de la Francophonie, the judo events were held at the Robert Guertin Arena in Gatineau from July 15 to July 17. A total of 14 events were contested according to gender and weight division.

== Medal winners ==
=== Men ===
Event	Gold	Silver	Bronze
Extra-lightweight (60 kg)	Cyril Soyer (FRA)	Daniel Simard (QBC)	Azizet Mandjombe (GAB)
Extra-lightweight (60 kg)	Cyril Soyer (FRA)	Daniel Simard (QBC)	Artur Klys (POL)
Half-lightweight (66 kg)	Franck Bellard (FRA)	Georgery Frédéric (Wallonia)	Faycal Bousbiat (QBC)
Half-lightweight (66 kg)	Franck Bellard (FRA)	Georgery Frédéric (Wallonia)	Stéphane Chrétien (CAN)
Lightweight (73 kg)	Haitham El Hossainy (EGY)	Ionel Nanu (ROU)	Jean-François Marceau (QBC)
Lightweight (73 kg)	Haitham El Hossainy (EGY)	Ionel Nanu (ROU)	Bernard Mvondo-Etoga (CMR)
Half-middleweight (81 kg)	Christophe Leprêtre (FRA)	Aboumedan El Sayed (EGY)	Adil Belgaïd (MAR)
Half-middleweight (81 kg)	Christophe Leprêtre (FRA)	Aboumedan El Sayed (EGY)	Dominique Hischier (SUI)
Middleweight (90 kg)	Vincenzo Carabetta (FRA)	Maxime Roberge (QBC)	Algimantas Merkevičius (LTU)
Middleweight (90 kg)	Vincenzo Carabetta (FRA)	Maxime Roberge (QBC)	Jiri Sanda (CZE)
Half-heavyweight (100 kg)	Nicolas Gill (QBC)	Bassel El-Gharbawy (EGY)	Sadok Khalgui (TUN)
Half-heavyweight (100 kg)	Nicolas Gill (QBC)	Bassel El-Gharbawy (EGY)	Pawel Sitarski (POL)
Heavyweight (+100 kg)	Gabriel Munteanu (ROU)	Joel Brutus (HAI)	Frédéric Antz (FRA)
Heavyweight (+100 kg)	Gabriel Munteanu (ROU)	Joel Brutus (HAI)	Grzegorz Eitel (POL)

=== Women ===
Event	Gold	Silver	Bronze
Extra-lightweight (48 kg)	Laura Moise (ROU)	Hajer Barhoumi (TUN)	Virginie L´Hermitte (FRA)
Extra-lightweight (48 kg)	Laura Moise (ROU)	Hajer Barhoumi (TUN)	Cynthya Tan (CAN)
Half-lightweight (52 kg)	Audrey La Rizza (FRA)	Emi Tasaka (CAN)	Hayet Rouini (TUN)
Half-lightweight (52 kg)	Audrey La Rizza (FRA)	Emi Tasaka (CAN)	Aminata Sall (QBC)
Lightweight (57 kg)	Fanny Riaboff (FRA)	Luce Baillargeon (QBC)	Michelle Buckingham (CAN)
Lightweight (57 kg)	Fanny Riaboff (FRA)	Luce Baillargeon (QBC)	Michaela Soukalova (CZE)
Half-middleweight (63 kg)	Johanne Vanbergen (Wallonia)	Hanitra Razanamalala (MAD)	Sophie Roberge (CAN)
Half-middleweight (63 kg)	Johanne Vanbergen (Wallonia)	Hanitra Razanamalala (MAD)	Yoko Shinomiya (SUI)
Middleweight (70 kg)	Marie-Hélène Chisholm (CAN)	Lea Zahoui Blavo (CIV)	Catherine Roberge (QBC)
Middleweight (70 kg)	Marie-Hélène Chisholm (CAN)	Lea Zahoui Blavo (CIV)	Yousra Zribi (TUN)
Half-heavyweight (78 kg)	Mélanie Engoang (GAB)	Agnieszka Chlipała (POL)	Amy Cotton (CAN)
Half-heavyweight (78 kg)	Mélanie Engoang (GAB)	Agnieszka Chlipała (POL)	Stéphanie Possamaï (FRA)
Heavyweight (+78 kg)	Insaf Yahyaoui (TUN)	Awah Chemabo (CMR)	Sédrine Portet (FRA)
Heavyweight (+78 kg)	Insaf Yahyaoui (TUN)	Awah Chemabo (CMR)	Heba Hefny (EGY)

=== Medal table ===
* Host nations (Canada, Quebec)

Rank	Nation	Gold	Silver	Bronze	Total
1	France (FRA)	6	0	4	10
2	Romania (ROU)	2	1	0	3
3	Quebec (QBC)*	1	3	4	8
4	Egypt (EGY)	1	2	1	4
5	Canada (CAN)*	1	1	5	7
6	Tunisia (TUN)	1	1	3	5
7	(Wallonia) French Community of Belgium	1	1	0	2
8	Gabon (GAB)	1	0	1	2
9	Poland (POL)	0	1	3	4
10	Cameroon (CMR)	0	1	1	2
11	Haiti (HAI)	0	1	0	1
11	Ivory Coast (CIV)	0	1	0	1
11	Madagascar (MAD)	0	1	0	1
14	Czech Republic (CZE)	0	0	2	2
14	Switzerland (SUI)	0	0	2	2
16	Lithuania (LTU)	0	0	1	1
16	Morocco (MAR)	0	0	1	1
Totals (17 entries)		14	14	28	56
