= Akapei Latu =

Tongan judoka

Personal information
- Full name: Akapei Latu
- Nationality: Tonga
- Born: 3 November 1978 (age 47) Nuku'alofa, Tongatapu, Tonga
- Height: 1.76 m (5 ft 9 in)
- Weight: 73 kg (161 lb)

Sport
- Sport: Judo
- Event: 73 kg

Akapei Latu (born November 3, 1978) is a Tongan judoka, who competed in the men's lightweight category. Latu qualified as a lone judoka for the Tongan squad in the men's lightweight class (73 kg) at the 2004 Summer Olympics in Athens, by granting a tripartite invitation from the International Judo Federation. He received a bye in the opening round, before losing out in his first match to Algeria's Noureddine Yagoubi, who pinned and subdued him on the tatami with a kuchiki taoshi (single leg takedown) assault at three minutes and seven seconds.
