= Claudiu Baștea =

Romanian judoka

Personal information
- Born: 18 March 1979 (age 47) Sibiu
- Occupation: Judoka

Sport
- Country: Romania
- Sport: Judo
- Weight class: ‍–‍73 kg

Achievements and titles
- Olympic Games: R16 (2004)
- World Champ.: 5th (2005)
- European Champ.: 5th (2000, 2004)
Medal record
Men's judo
Representing Romania
World Juniors Championships
Bronze medal – third place	1998 Cali	‍–‍73 kg
European Junior Championships
Bronze medal – third place	1998 Bucharest	‍–‍73 kg

Profile at external databases
- IJF: 6332
- JudoInside.com: 545
- Updated on 2 June 2022

Claudiu Baştea (born 18 March 1979 in Sibiu) is a Romanian judoka.

== Achievements ==
Year	Tournament	Place	Weight class
2007	European Judo Championships	7th	Lightweight (73 kg)
2005	World Judo Championships	5th	Lightweight (73 kg)
2004	European Judo Championships	5th	Lightweight (73 kg)
2000	European Judo Championships	5th	Lightweight (73 kg)
