= Daniel Fernandes (judoka) =

French judoka (born 1973)

Personal information
- Born: 14 March 1973 (age 53)
- Occupation: Judoka

Sport
- Country: France
- Sport: Judo
- Weight class: ‍–‍73 kg
- Rank: 6th dan black belt

Achievements and titles
- Olympic Games: 5th (2004)
- World Champ.: (silver) (2003)
- European Champ.: (silver) (2006)
Medal record
Men's judo
Representing France
World Championships
Silver medal – second place	2003 Osaka	‍–‍73 kg
European Championships
Silver medal – second place	2006 Tampere	‍–‍73 kg
Bronze medal – third place	2001 Paris	‍–‍73 kg
Bronze medal – third place	2005 Rotterdam	‍–‍73 kg

Profile at external databases
- IJF: 15555
- JudoInside.com: 357
- Updated on 17 November 2022

Daniel Fernandes (born 14 March 1973) is a French judoka.

== Achievements ==
Year	Tournament	Place	Weight class
2006	European Judo Championships	2nd	Lightweight (73 kg)
2004	Olympic Games	5th	Lightweight (73 kg)
2003	World Judo Championships	2nd	Lightweight (73 kg)
2001	European Judo Championships	3rd	Lightweight (73 kg)
