= Krzysztof Wiłkomirski =

Polish judoka

Personal information
- Born: 18 September 1980 (age 46)
- Occupation: Judoka

Sport
- Country: Poland
- Sport: Judo
- Weight class: –73 kg

Achievements and titles
- Olympic Games: R16 (2004, 2008)
- World Champ.: (bronze) (2001)
- European Champ.: (bronze) (2003)
Medal record
Men's judo
Representing Poland
World Championships
Bronze medal – third place	2001 Munich	–73 kg
European Championships
Bronze medal – third place	2003 Düsseldorf	–73 kg
IJF Grand Slam
Bronze medal – third place	2010 Rio de Janeiro	–73 kg
IJF Grand Prix
Silver medal – second place	2009 Abu Dhabi	–73 kg

Profile at external databases
- IJF: 1750
- JudoInside.com: 1179
- Updated on 28 November 2022

Krzysztof Wiłkomirski (born 18 September 1980 in Warsaw) is a Polish judoka.

His son Filip Wiłkomirski is a judoka and actor.

== Achievements ==
Year	Tournament	Place	Weight class
2009	European Judo Championships	7th	Lightweight (73 kg)
2005	World Judo Championships	7th	Lightweight (73 kg)
2003	European Judo Championships	3rd	Lightweight (73 kg)
2001	World Judo Championships	3rd	Lightweight (73 kg)
2001	European Judo Championships	5th	Lightweight (73 kg)
