= Serghei Stolearenco =

Moldovan swimmer

Personal information
- National team: Moldova
- Born: 14 November 1978 (age 47) Bender, Moldavian SSR
- Height: 1.87 m (6 ft 2 in)
- Weight: 80 kg (176 lb)

Sport
- Sport: Swimming
- Strokes: Freestyle
- Club: Dynamo Moldova

Serghei Stolearenco (born November 14, 1978) is a Moldovan former swimmer, who specialized in sprint freestyle events. He is a single-time Olympian (2000), and a member of a swimming club for Dynamo Moldova.

Stolearenco competed only in the men's 50 m freestyle at the 2000 Summer Olympics in Sydney. He achieved a FINA B-standard entry time of 23.86 from the Russian Open Championships in Saint Petersburg. He challenged seven other swimmers in heat four, including Kyrgyzstan's Sergey Ashihmin, Goodwill Games silver medalist for Russia, and Kazakhstan's two-time Olympian Sergey Borisenko. He raced to a third seed by 0.38 of a second behind Borisenko, winner of his heat, in a lifetime best of 23.84. Stolearenco failed to advance into the semifinals, as he placed forty-seventh overall out of 80 swimmers in the prelims.
