= Damdiny Süldbayar =

Mongolian judoka (born 1981)

Damdiny Süldbayar (Mongolian: Дамдины Сүлдбаяр) (born July 1, 1981) is a Mongolian judoka who competed in the men's lightweight category. He competed at the 2002 Asian Games, but lost the bronze medal match in the Men's 73 kg event to Egamnazar Akbarov of Uzbekistan. However, the following year he won the bronze medal at the 2003 Asian Judo Championships. At the 2004 Summer Olympic Games he was defeated in the quarter-finals.

He competed in his first MMA bout in Cagezilla 52, where he won the fight via KO in the first round.

His father is the judoka Tsendiin Damdin.
