= Dumitru Zastoico =

Moldovan swimmer

Personal information
- Full name: Dumitru Zastoico
- National team: Moldova
- Born: 27 April 1979 (age 47) Bălți, Moldavian SSR, Soviet Union
- Height: 1.82 m (6 ft 0 in)
- Weight: 75 kg (165 lb)

Sport
- Sport: Swimming
- Strokes: Butterfly
- Club: Moldova Swimming Team

Dumitru Zastoico (born April 27, 1979) is a Moldovan former swimmer, who specialized in butterfly events. He is a 2000 Olympian, and a member of the Moldova swimming team.

Zastoico competed only in two individual events at the 2000 Summer Olympics in Sydney. He achieved FINA B-standards of 56.21 (100 m butterfly) and 2:05.12 (200 m butterfly) from the Russian Open Championships in Saint Petersburg. In his first event, 200 m butterfly, Zastoico placed fifty-ninth on the morning prelims. Swimming in heat one, he picked up a fourth seed by 5.72 seconds behind winner Tseng Cheng-hua of Chinese Taipei in 2:09.34. Three days later, in the 100 m butterfly, Zastoico challenged seven other swimmers in heat three, including Kyrgyzstan's Konstantin Ushkov, silver medalist for Russia in Atlanta four years earlier, and Uzbekistan's top favorite Ravil Nachaev. He rounded out a field to last place and fifty-ninth overall by more than three seconds behind winner Nachaev in 58.55.
