= Xie Jianhua (judoka) =

Chinese judoka

Xie Jianhua (simplified Chinese: 谢建华; traditional Chinese: 謝建華; pinyin: Xiè Jiànhuá; born June 24, 1976, in Beijing) is a male Chinese judoka who competed in the 2004 Summer Olympics.

He lost in the first round of the main tournament as well as in the first round of the repechage in the lightweight class.

He served as a supervisor for the 2024 Beijing Youth Judo Championship.
