= Bernard Mvondo-Etoga =

Cameroonian judoka (1983–2020)

Bernard Sylvain Mvondo-Etoga (4 May 1983 – 24 December 2020) was a Cameroonian judoka. He competed in the 2004 Summer Olympics. He won a bronze medal at the 2001 Jeux de la Francophonie.

He died on 24 December 2020, in a French prison under mysterious circumstances after being in custody for a week.

== Achievements ==
Year	Tournament	Place	Weight class
2004	African Judo Championships	1st	Lightweight (73 kg)
2002	African Judo Championships	3rd	Lightweight (73 kg)
2001	Jeux de la Francophonie	3rd	Lightweight (73 kg)
1998	African Judo Championships	5th	Half lightweight (66 kg)
