= Jimmy Pedro =

American judoka

Personal information
- Nickname: Peanuts
- Nationality: (United States) American
- Born: James A. Pedro; October 30, 1970 (age 56) Danvers, Massachusetts, U.S.
- Home town: Methuen, Massachusetts, U.S.
- Education: Brown University
- Occupation: Judo Instructor
- Height: 5 ft 9 in (1.75 m)
- Spouse: Marie Pedro
- Website: www.jimmypedrojudo.com

Sport
- Country: United States
- Sport: Judo
- Rank: 7th dan black belt
- Club: NYAC
- Coached by: Jim Pedro
- Now coaching: Pedro’s Judo Center in Wakefield, Massachusetts

Achievements and titles
- Olympic Games: (bronze) (1996, 2004)
- World Champ.: (gold) (1999)
- Pan American Champ.: (gold) (1992, 1997, 1998, 2004)
Medal record
Men's judo
Representing United States
Olympic Games
Bronze medal – third place	1996 Atlanta	‍–‍71 kg
Bronze medal – third place	2004 Athens	‍–‍73 kg
World Championships
Gold medal – first place	1999 Birmingham	‍–‍73 kg
Bronze medal – third place	1991 Barcelona	‍–‍65 kg
Bronze medal – third place	1995 Chiba	‍–‍71 kg
Pan American Games
Gold medal – first place	1995 Mara del Plata	‍–‍71 kg
Gold medal – first place	1999 Winnipeg	‍–‍73 kg
Bronze medal – third place	1991 Havana	‍–‍65 kg
Pan American Championships
Gold medal – first place	1992 Ontario	‍–‍65 kg
Gold medal – first place	1997 Guadalajara	‍–‍71 kg
Gold medal – first place	1998 Santo Domingo	‍–‍73 kg
Gold medal – first place	2004 Isla Margarita	‍–‍73 kg
Silver medal – second place	1988 Buenos Aires	‍–‍60 kg
Bronze medal – third place	1990 Caracas	‍–‍65 kg
World Juniors Championships
Bronze medal – third place	1990 Dijon	‍–‍65 kg
Pan American Junior Championships
Gold medal – first place	1989 Quito	‍–‍65 kg

Profile at external databases
- IJF: 590
- JudoInside.com: 3588
- Updated on 30 May 2023

James A. Pedro (born October 30, 1970) is an American retired World Champion and Olympic judoka, as well as a current judo coach. Pedro currently holds a 7th degree black belt in judo. He is the coach of Kayla Harrison, the first and currently only American to win an Olympic gold medal in judo.

== Early life and education ==
Pedro was born on October 30, 1970, in Danvers, Massachusetts. He was trained by his father James Pedro Sr., a 1976 Olympic Alternate. Pedro is currently a 7th degree Black Belt in judo, and also has a Bachelor of Arts (BA) in Business Economics and Organizational Behavior & Management from Brown University, whom he also wrestled for. His favorite judo technique is Sode Tsuri Komi Goshi, and his most effective is Juji Gatame.

== Achievements ==
Pedro was the World Champion at 73 kg in 1999 after defeating Vitaly Makarov of Russia in the final, and also won bronze medals in the 1991 and 1995 World Championships. Pedro represented the United States in the 1992, 1996, 2000, and 2004 Olympic Games, winning bronze in 1996 and 2004. His entry in the "Legends" section of a major judo magazine's web site lists 29 gold medals in international competition.

=== National honors ===
- 04, 03, 00 & 99 Real Judo Magazine "Player of the Year"
- 04 New York Athletic Club Hall of Fame
- 04 Brown University Hall of Fame
- 97 New York Athletic Club "Athlete of the Year"
- 97 Black Belt Hall of Fame
- 10x USJA Jr. National Champion
- 6x US National Champion (89, 91, 93, 94, 99, 03)
- 3x High School National Champion (86, 87, 88)

=== Gold major international medals ===
- 04 & 00 German Team Championships (73 kg Member of TSV Abensberg)
- 04 & 03 New York Open (73 kg) - Manhattan, United States
- 04 Pan Am Championships (73 kg) - Margarita Island, Venezuela
- 03 Korean Open (73 kg) - Yongin University, South Korea
- 03 Rendez Vous Canada (73 kg) - Montreal, Canada
- 03 Tre Torri (73 kg) - Porto Sant'Elpidio, Italy
- 03 Puerto Rico Open (73 kg) - Salinas, Puerto Rico
- 03 British Open (73 kg) - London, United Kingdom
- 00 Europa Cup Team Championships (73 kg Member of TSV Abensberg)
- 99 World Championships (73 kg) - Birmingham, United Kingdom
- 99 Pan Am Games (73 kg) - Winnipeg, Canada
- 98 US Open (73 kg) - Colorado Springs, United States
- 98 Pan Am Championships (73 kg) - Santo Domingo, Dominican Republic
- 98 French Open (73 kg) - Paris, France
- 98 Austrian Open (73 kg) - Leonding, Austria
- 98 Shoriki Cup (73 kg) - Tokyo, Japan
- 97 & 95 German Open (71 kg) - Munich, Germany
- 97 Pan Am Championships (71 kg) - Guadalajara, Mexico
- 95 US Open (71 kg) - Macon, United States
- 95 Pan Am Games (71 kg) - Mar de Plata, Argentina
- 93 Pacific Rim Championships (65 kg) - Auckland, New Zealand
- 92 Guido Sieni (65 kg) - Sassari, Italy
- 92 Pan Am Championships (65 kg) - Santiago, Chile
- 92 US Open (71 kg) - Colorado Springs, United States
- 90 & 89 US Open (65 kg) - Colorado Springs, United States
- 90 Tre Torri (65 kg) - Porto Sant'Elpidio, Italy

=== Silver major international medals ===
- 04 Hungarian Open (73 kg) - Budapest, Hungary
- 04 German Open (73 kg) - Hamburg, Germany
- 03 US Open (73 kg) - Las Vegas, United States
- 93 Korean Open (65 kg) - Seoul, South Korea
- 93 French Open (63 kg) - Paris, France
- 92 Hungarian Open (65 kg) - Budapest, Hungary
- 90 Goodwill Games (65 kg) - Seattle, US

=== Bronze major international medals ===
- 04 Olympic Games (73 kg) - Athens, Greece
- 99 Kano Cup (73 kg) - Tokyo, Japan
- 98 German Open (73 kg) - Munich, Germany
- 97 Austrian Open (71 kg) - Leonding, Austria
- 96 French Open (71 kg) - Paris, France
- 96 Olympic Games (73 kg) - Atlanta, United States
- 95 World Championships (71 kg) - Makuhari, Japan
- 95 Pacific Rim Championships (71 kg) - Sydney, Australia
- 94 Goodwill Games (71 kg) - Saint Petersburg, Russia
- 92 French Open (65 kg) - Paris, France
- 92 German Open (65 kg) - Munich, Germany
- 91 US Open (65 kg) - Colorado Springs, United States
- 91 Pan Am Games (65 kg) - Havana, Cuba
- 91 World Championships (65 kg) - Barcelona, Spain
- 91 Pacific Rim Championships (65 kg) - Honolulu, United States
- 90 Jr. World Championships (65 kg) - Dijon, France
- 90 Tblissi International (65 kg) - Tbilisi, Georgia
- 88 Shoriki Cup (65 kg) - Tokyo, Japan

=== 5th place in major international events ===
- 00 Olympic Games (73 kg) - Sydney, Australia
- 94 Kano Cup (71 kg) - Tokyo, Japan
- 93 World Championships (65 kg) - Hamilton, Canada

== Post-competition career ==
Pedro retired from competitive judo after the 2004 Olympics. He has worked for Monster.com, promoted a brand of tatami training mats used for judo and jujutsu practice and competition, and been the subject of a biographical movie. A newaza (ground techniques) specialist, Jimmy currently owns and operates Pedro's Judo Center in Wakefield, Massachusetts, and teaches clinics and seminars throughout the country. Pedro also coached the U.S. Olympic Judo team at the 2012 Olympics in London. He is the national sales executive for FUJI Mats + Facility Design. He is Kayla Harrison's coach. Harrison was the first American to win an Olympic gold medal in judo.

Fury on the mat is a biographical movie about Jimmy Pedro.

== Personal life ==
Pedro is married and the father of four children.

== Notable students ==
- Kayla Harrison (2x Olympic Champion and current UFC Women's Bantamweight Champion)
- Travis Stevens (3x Olympian and 2016 Olympic silver medalist)
- Ronda Rousey (2008 Olympic Bronze Medalist and former UFC Champion)
- Rick Hawn (Olympian and Bellator Tournament Champion)
- Janine Nakao (Pan American silver medalist)
- Taraje Williams-Murray (2x Olympian)

== Published works ==
- Judo Techniques and Tactics, Jimmy Pedro and William Durbin. ISBN 0-7360-0343-6
