= Marlon Acácio =

Olympic judoka

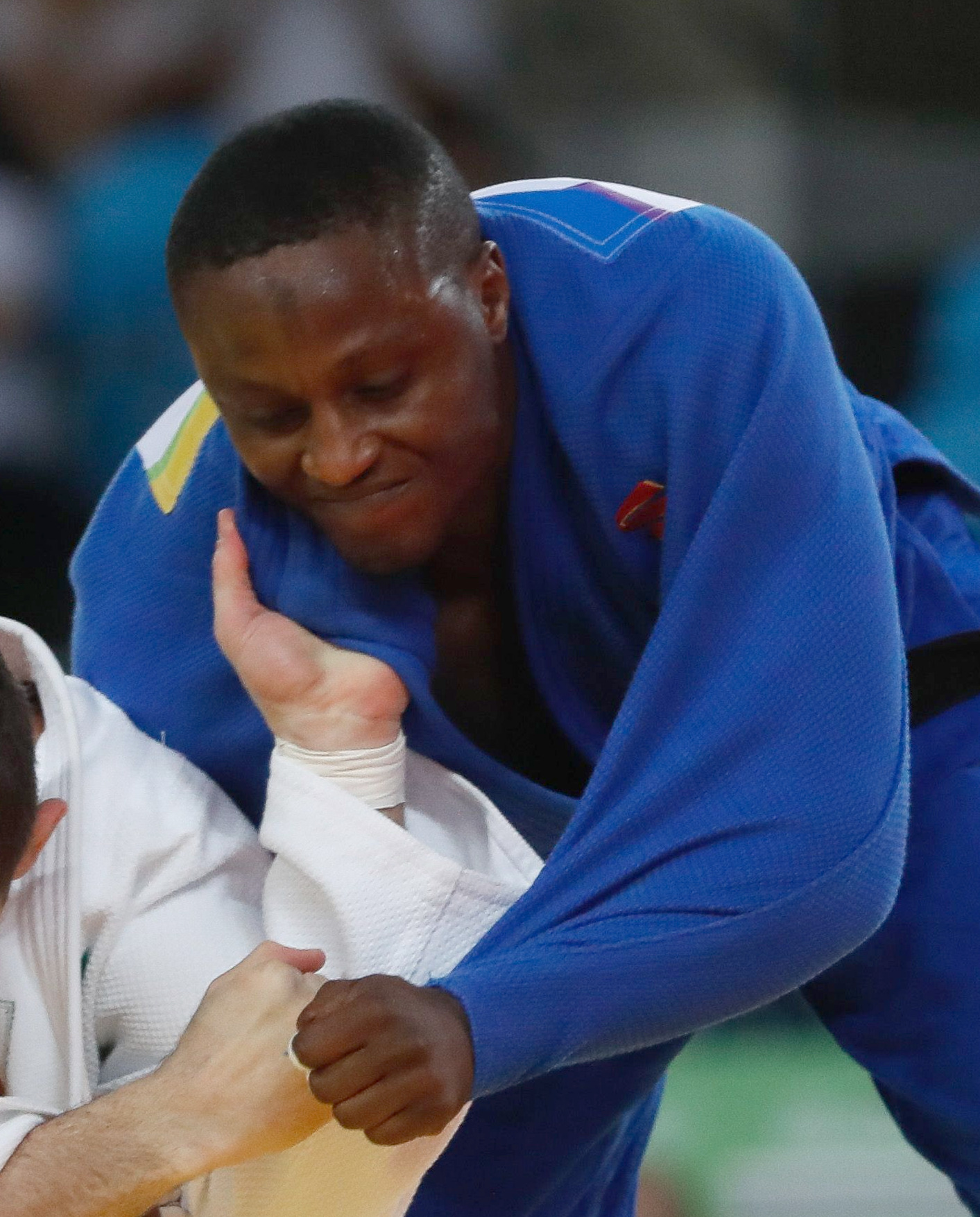
- Acácio at the 2016 Olympics

Personal information
- Born: July 9, 1982 (age 43) Johannesburg, South Africa
- Height: 180 cm (5 ft 11 in)

Sport
- Country: Mozambique
- Sport: Judo
- Club: Tuks Judo Club, Pretoria
- Coached by: Nikola Filipov
Medal record
Representing South Africa
African Championships
| Bronze medal – third place | 2008 Agadir | 73 kg |

Marlon Acácio, previously known as Marlon August, (born July 9, 1982) is a judoka. Competing for South Africa in the 73 kg division he won a bronze medal at the 2008 African Championships and reached quarterfinals at the 2008 Olympics. At the 2016 Summer Olympics he competed for Mozambique in the 81 kg division, and was eliminated in the first bout.

Acácio was born in Johannesburg to Mozambican parents. He is married to Evagelia August. He co-owns the Conscious Healing Centre, a wellness and personal development facility in Johannesburg. After the 2008 Olympics he retired from sport for 4 years due to the lack of sponsorship and worked for an import company in Johannesburg. After that he changed nationality and last name and competed for Mozambique.
