= David Kevkhishvili =

Georgian judoka (born 1983)

Personal information
- Native name: დავით ქევხიშვილი
- Born: 5 January 1983 (age 43)
- Occupation: Judoka

Sport
- Country: Georgia
- Sport: Judo
- Weight class: ‍–‍73 kg

Achievements and titles
- Olympic Games: 7th (2004)
- World Champ.: 5th (2007)
- European Champ.: (silver) (2002, 2007)
Medal record
Men's judo
Representing Georgia
European Championships
| Silver medal – second place | 2002 Maribor | ‍–‍73 kg |
| Silver medal – second place | 2007 Belgrade | ‍–‍73 kg |
| Bronze medal – third place | 2004 Bucharest | ‍–‍73 kg |
| Bronze medal – third place | 2005 Rotterdam | ‍–‍73 kg |
| Bronze medal – third place | 2008 Lisbon | ‍–‍73 kg |
European Junior Championships
| Gold medal – first place | 2002 Rotterdam | ‍–‍73 kg |

Profile at external databases
- IJF: 765
- JudoInside.com: 14163
- Updated on 16 November 2022

David Kevkhishvili (Georgian: დავით ქევხიშვილი, born 5 January 1983) is a Georgian judoka.

== Achievements ==
| Year | Tournament | Place | Weight class |
|---|---|---|---|
| 2008 | European Championships | 3rd | Lightweight (73 kg) |
| 2007 | World Judo Championships | 5th | Lightweight (73 kg) |
| 2007 | European Judo Championships | 2nd | Lightweight (73 kg) |
| 2005 | European Judo Championships | 3rd | Lightweight (73 kg) |
| 2004 | Olympic Games | 7th | Lightweight (73 kg) |
| 2004 | European Judo Championships | 3rd | Lightweight (73 kg) |
| 2002 | European Judo Championships | 2nd | Lightweight (73 kg) |
