= Taraje Williams-Murray =

American judoka (born 1984)

- Born: Taraje Williams-Murray; November 9, 1984 (age 42); Bronx, New York USA
- Nationality: American
- Height: 5 ft 7 in (1.70 m)
- Weight: 60 kg (130 lb; 9.4 st)
- Style: Judo
- Teacher: Ralph Reyes. Jimmy Pedro. Arkadiy Aronov.
- Rank: 1st degree black belt in Judo

Other information
- Occupation: Entrepreneur
- University: Long Island University and Boston University
- Notable club: Jamie Towers Judo Club
- Notable school: New York Athletic Club / USA Judo National Training Site at Team FORCE / Spartak Sports Club
- Website: www.taraje.com

Taraje Williams-Murray (born November 9, 1984, in Bronx, New York) is an American Judoka. He graduated from high school at the age of 15 and went to college. After an initial health scare where he was diagnosed with beta thalassemia, Taraje was able to continue to compete at a high level. He competed in the Beijing Olympics at the age of 23, as well as the Athens Olympics at the age of 19 for Team USA.
