= Ryan Reser =

American judoka (born 1980)

Personal information
- Born: April 16, 1980 (age 46)
Medal record
Men's Judo
Representing the United States
Pan American Games
Gold medal – first place	2007 Rio de Janeiro	Lightweight

Ryan Reser (born April 16, 1980 in Denver, Colorado) is a male judoka from the United States, who won the gold medal in the men's lightweight division (– 73 kg) at the 2007 Pan American Games, defeating Brazil's Leandro Guilheiro in the final. He represented his native country at the 2008 Summer Olympics.
