= Rubert Martínez =

Cuban judoka (born 1985)

Personal information
- Born: July 16, 1985 (age 40)
Medal record
Men's Judo
Representing Cuba
Pan American Games
Silver medal – second place	2003	Lightweight

Rubert Martínez Texidor (born July 16, 1985) is a male judoka from Cuba, who won the silver medal in the men's lightweight division (– 73 kg) at the 2003 Pan American Games. He represented his native country at the 2004 Summer Olympics in Athens, Greece, where he was defeated in the first round.
