= Si Rijigawa =

Chinese judoka

Medal record

Representing China

Men's Judo

East Asian Games
Silver medal – second place	2009 Hong Kong	-73 kg

Si Rijigawa (Mongolian:Serjgavaa, Chinese: 斯日吉嘎瓦; born 1986-10-08 in Inner Mongolia) is a male Southern Mongol judoka from China who competed at the 2008 Summer Olympics in the Lightweight (66–73 kg) event.

== Major performances ==
- 2006 World University Championships - 5th

== See also ==
- China at the 2008 Summer Olympics
