= Oleg Moldovan =

Moldovan sports shooter (born 1966)

Medal record

Men's shooting

Representing Moldova

Olympic Games
Silver medal – second place	2000 Sydney	10 m running target

Oleg Moldovan (born 27 October 1966) is a former sport shooter from Moldova. He won the silver medal at the 2000 Olympic Games in the 10 m Running Target event. He was beaten by Yang Ling of China by 0.1 of a point.

Moldovan was the flagbearer for the Moldovan team at the 2004 Summer Olympics Opening Ceremony.

Olympic results
Event	1988	1992	1996	2000	2004
50 metre running target	14th 583	Not held			
10 metre running target	Not held	—	9th 569	(silver) Silver; 580+101.0	14th 568
