= Yusuke Kanamaru =

Japanese judoka (born 1979)

Personal information
- Born: 14 September 1979 (age 46)
- Occupation: Judoka

Sport
- Country: Japan
- Sport: Judo
- Weight class: ‍–‍73 kg

Achievements and titles
- Olympic Games: 7th (2008)
- World Champ.: (silver) (2001)
- Asian Champ.: (silver) (2002, 2003)
Medal record
Men's judo
Representing Japan
World Championships
Silver medal – second place	2001 Munich	‍–‍73 kg
Bronze medal – third place	2007 Rio de Janeiro	‍–‍73 kg
Asian Games
Silver medal – second place	2002 Busan	‍–‍73 kg
Asian Championships
Silver medal – second place	2003 Jeju	‍–‍73 kg
Bronze medal – third place	2005 Tashkent	‍–‍73 kg
East Asian Games
Silver medal – second place	2001 Osaka	‍–‍73 kg

Profile at external databases
- IJF: 3286
- JudoInside.com: 8918
- Updated on 19 November 2022

Yusuke Kanamaru (金丸 雄介, Kanamaru Yūsuke; born 14 September 1979) is a retired Japanese judoka.

Kanamaru was born in Tsurugi, Ishikawa, and began to train in judo at the age of 5. He entered the Ryotokuji Gakuen after graduating from Tsukuba University.

Kanamaru is good at Seoinage and Sode tsurikomi goshi. Since 2000, He got a gold medal at the Kodokan Cup, and has been a judoka representing Japan in the Lightweight category.

Kanamaru placed seventh in the men's 73 kg class at the 2008 Summer Olympics.

== Achievements ==
Year	Date	Tournament	Place	Weight class
1997	12.6	Kodokan Cup	3rd	Lightweight (-73 kg)
1998	11.28	Kodokan Cup	3rd	Lightweight (-73 kg)
1999	1.9	Jigoro Kano Cup	Round of 8	Lightweight (-73 kg)
1999	11.27	Kodokan Cup	3rd	Lightweight (-73 kg)
2000	11.25	Kodokan Cup	1st	Lightweight (-73 kg)
2001	?	All-Japan Weight Class Championships	1st	Lightweight (-73 kg)
2001	7.27	World Championships	2nd	Lightweight (-73 kg)
2002	10.?	Asian Games	1st	Lightweight (-73 kg)
2003	1.12	Jigoro Kano Cup	1st	Lightweight (-73 kg)
2003	2.22	Hamburg Super World Cup	1st	Lightweight (-73 kg)
2003	?	All-Japan Weight Class Championships	1st	Lightweight (-73 kg)
2003	9.13	World Championships	7th	Lightweight (-73 kg)
2003	10.31	Asian Championships	2nd	Lightweight (-73 kg)
2004	11.21	Kodokan Cup	1st	Lightweight (-73 kg)
2005	2.5	Paris Super World Cup	loss	Lightweight (-73 kg)
2005	5.14	Asian Championships	3rd	Lightweight (-73 kg)
2006	1.14	Jigoro Kano Cup	3rd	Lightweight (-73 kg)
2006	2.25	Hamburg Super World Cup	5th	Lightweight (-73 kg)
2006	11.19	Kodokan Cup	3rd	Lightweight (-73 kg)
2007	2.10	Paris Super World Cup	1st	Lightweight (-73 kg)
2007	4.7	All-Japan Weight Class Championships	1st	Lightweight (-73 kg)
2007	9.15	World Championships	3rd	Lightweight (-73 kg)
2008	2.23	Hamburg Super World Cup	loss	Lightweight (-73 kg)
2008	4.5	All-Japan Weight Class Championships	1st	Lightweight (-73 kg)
2008	8.11	Olympic Games	7th	Lightweight (-73 kg)
