= Victor Rogut =

Moldovan swimmer

Personal information
- Full name: Victor Rogut
- National team: Moldova
- Born: 28 February 1979 (age 47) Chişinău, Moldavian SSR
- Height: 1.72 m (5 ft 8 in)
- Weight: 62 kg (137 lb)

Sport
- Sport: Swimming
- Strokes: Freestyle
- Club: Moldova Swimming Team

Victor Rogut (born 28 February 1979) is a Moldovan former swimmer, who specialized in long-distance freestyle events. He is a two-time Olympian (2000 and 2004) and a member of the Moldova Swimming Team.

Rogut made his official debut at the 2000 Summer Olympics in Sydney, where he competed in the 400 m freestyle. Swimming in heat two, he edged out Turkey's Aytekin Mindan to claim a sixth spot and thirty-eighth overall by four hundredths of a second (0.04) in 4:01.42.

At the 2004 Summer Olympics in Athens, Rogut qualified again for the 400 m freestyle, by achieving a FINA B-standard of 4:01.05 from the Russian Open Championships in Moscow. He challenged seven other swimmers in heat two, including his former rival Mindan and Bulgaria's Petar Stoychev, who later emerged as a top favorite in open water. Rogut pulled off another sixth-place finish in the same heat from four years ago in 4:01.68, just 0.24 of a second off his entry time. Rogut failed to reach the top 8 final, as he placed thirty-fifth overall in the preliminaries.
