= Alexandru Ivlev =

Moldovan swimmer

Personal information
- Full name: Alexandru Ivlev
- National team: Moldova
- Born: 7 February 1981 (age 45) Chişinău, Moldavian SSR, Soviet Union
- Height: 1.84 m (6 ft 0 in)
- Weight: 70 kg (154 lb)

Sport
- Sport: Swimming
- Strokes: Backstroke
- Club: Olimpia Chişinău

Alexandru Ivlev (born 7 February 1981) is a Moldovan former swimmer, who specialized in backstroke events. He is a two-time Olympian, and a member of the swimming team for Olimpia Chişinău.

Ivlev's Olympic debut came at the 2000 Summer Olympics in Sydney. There, he established a personal best of 57.91 to top the first heat of the men's 100 m backstroke, but finished only in thirty-eighth place.

At the 2004 Summer Olympics in Athens, Ivlev qualified again for the 100 m backstroke by clearing a FINA B-standard entry time of 58.39 from the Russian Open Championships in Moscow. Unlike his first Olympics, Ivlev raced to third place on the same heat by 0.21 of a second behind Kazakhstan's Stanislav Osinsky in 1:00.13. Ivlev failed to advance into the semifinals, as he placed forty-second overall in the preliminaries.
