= Hamed Malekmohammadi =

Iranian judoka (born 1983)

Personal information
- Full name: Hamed Malekmohammadi Memar
- Nationality: Iran
- Born: 10 April 1983 (age 43)
- Occupation: Judoka
- Height: 1.77 m (5 ft 9 1/2 in)
- Weight: 73 kg (161 lb)

Sport
- Sport: Judo
Medal record
Men's judo
Representing Iran
Asian Games
Bronze medal – third place	2002 Busan	73 kg
Asian Championships
Silver medal – second place	2008 Jeju City	81 kg

Profile at external databases
- JudoInside.com: 13893

Hamed Malekmohammadi Memar (Persian: حامد ملک‌محمدی معمار; born April 10, 1983) is an Iranian former judoka, who played for both the lightweight and half-middleweight categories. He won the silver medal for the men's 81 kg class at the 2008 Asian Judo Championships in Jeju City, South Korea, losing out to South Korea's Kim Jae-Bum.

In 2001, he refused to compete against Israeli Olympian Yoel Razvozov.

Malekmohammadi took part in the 2004 Summer Olympics in Athens, where he competed for the men's 73 kg class. He reached the second preliminary match of the competition, where he lost by an ippon to Moldova's Victor Bivol. Malekmohammadi, however, offered another shot for a bronze medal shot by entering the repechage bouts. He defeated Richard Leon of Venezuela in the first round, before losing out at the last few seconds to Portugal's João Neto.

At the 2008 Summer Olympics in Beijing, Malekmohammadi competed for a higher class, men's half-middleweight division. He lost again in the second preliminary match this time, to Brazil's Tiago Camilo, who successfully scored an ippon in the middle of a five-minute period. Unlike his first Olympics, Malekmohammadi did not qualify for the repechage, when his opponent got eliminated in the subsequent match.

== See also ==
- Boycotts of Israel in individual sports
