= Gennadiy Bilodid =

Ukrainian judoka (born 1977)

Personal information
- Born: 22 July 1977 (age 48)
- Occupation: Judoka

Sport
- Country: Ukraine
- Sport: Judo
- Weight class: ‍–‍73 kg

Achievements and titles
- Olympic Games: 7th (2008)
- World Champ.: (bronze) (2005)
- European Champ.: (gold) (2001, 2003)
Medal record
Representing Ukraine
Men's judo
World Championships
Bronze medal – third place	2005 Cairo	‍–‍73 kg
European Championships
Gold medal – first place	2001 Paris	‍–‍73 kg
Gold medal – first place	2003 Düsseldorf	‍–‍73 kg
World Juniors Championships
Bronze medal – third place	1996 Porto	‍–‍78 kg
European Junior Championships
Bronze medal – third place	1997 Ljubljana	‍–‍78 kg
Summer Universiade
Bronze medal – third place	1999 Palma de Mallorca	Men's team
Men's sambo
World Championships
Silver medal – second place	2002 Panama	‍–‍74 kg
Bronze medal – third place	2000 Kyiv	‍–‍74 kg

Profile at external databases
- IJF: 5202
- JudoInside.com: 3162
- Updated on 13 July 2024

Gennadiy Bilodid (or Hennadiy Bilodid, Ukrainian: Геннадій Білодід, born 22 July 1977) is a Ukrainian former judoka.

== Achievements ==
Year	Tournament	Place	Weight class
2005	World Judo Championships	3rd	Lightweight (73 kg)
2003	European Judo Championships	1st	Lightweight (73 kg)
2002	European Judo Championships	5th	Lightweight (73 kg)
2001	European Judo Championships	1st	Lightweight (73 kg)
2000	European Judo Championships	5th	Lightweight (73 kg)

== Personal life ==
Bilodid is the father of judoka Daria Bilodid.
