= Victor Bivol =

Moldovan judoka (born 1977)

Personal information
- Born: 15 July 1977 (age 49) Costești, Moldavian SSR, Soviet Union
- Occupation: Judoka

Sport
- Sport: Judo
- Division(s): light-weight (U73)
Medal record
Men's judo
Representing Moldova
World Championships
| Bronze medal – third place | 1997 Paris | 65 kg |
European Championships
| Bronze medal – third place | 1999 Bratislava | 66 kg |
Summer Universiade
| Bronze medal – third place | 1999 Palma de Mallorca | 66 kg |

Profile at external databases
- IJF: 52914
- JudoInside.com: 3124

Victor Bivol (born 15 July 1977) is a Moldovan judoka. He finished in joint fifth place in the lightweight (73 kg) division at the 2004 Summer Olympics, having lost the bronze medal match to Leandro Guilheiro of Brazil.

== Achievements ==
| Year | Tournament | Place | Weight class |
|---|---|---|---|
| 2007 | European Judo Championships | 5th | Lightweight (73 kg) |
| 2006 | European Judo Championships | 7th | Lightweight (73 kg) |
| 2004 | Olympic Games | 5th | Lightweight (73 kg) |
| 2003 | World Judo Championships | 5th | Lightweight (73 kg) |
| 2000 | European Judo Championships | 5th | Half lightweight (66 kg) |
| 1999 | European Judo Championships | 3rd | Half lightweight (66 kg) |
| 1999 | Universiade | 3rd | Half lightweight (66 kg) |
| 1997 | World Judo Championships | 3rd | Half lightweight (65 kg) |
