= Kyrgyzstan at the 2000 Summer Olympics =

- IOC code: KGZ
- NOC: National Olympic Committee of the Republic of Kyrgyzstan

in Sydney
- Competitors: 48 (35 men and 13 women) in 9 sports
- Flag bearer: Raatbek Sanatbayev
- Medals Ranked 71st: Gold 0 Silver 0 Bronze 1 Total 1

Summer Olympics appearances (overview)
- 1996; 2000; 2004; 2008; 2012; 2016; 2020; 2024

Other related appearances
- Russian Empire (1900–1912); Soviet Union (1952–1988); Unified Team (1992)

Kyrgyzstan competed at the 2000 Summer Olympics in Sydney, Australia. Kyrgyzstan won their first Olympic medal at these games. 48 competitors, 35 men and 13 women, took part in 59 events in 9 sports.

== Medalists ==
Medal	Name	Sport	Event	Date
Bronze	Aidyn Smagulov	Judo	Men's 60 kg	16 September

== Athletics ==
Key

- Q = Qualified for the next round by position in race or, in field events, by achieving the automatic qualification target
- q = Qualified for the next round as a fastest loser or, in field events, by position without achieving the qualifying target

Track and road events

Athlete	Event	Heat		Quarterfinal		Semifinal		Final	
Athlete	Event	Time	Rank	Time	Rank	Time	Rank	Time	Rank
Nazirdin Akylbekov	Men's marathon	—N/a						2:31:26	70
Oksana Luneva	Women's 400 m	54.98	46	Did not advance					
Irina Bogacheva	Women's marathon	—N/a						2:29:55	14

Field events

Athlete	Event	Qualification		Final	
Athlete	Event	Result	Rank	Result	Rank
Nikolay Davydov	Men's hammer throw	NM		Did not advance	
Dmitry Shnayder	Men's javelin throw	66.40	35	Did not advance	
Tatyana Efimenko	Women's high jump	NM		Did not advance	
Elena Bobrovskaya	Women's long jump	6.19	30	Did not advance	
Tatyana Sudarikova	Women's javelin throw	48.33	35	Did not advance	

== Boxing ==
Athlete	Event	Round of 32	Round of 16	Quarterfinal	Semifinal	Final	
Athlete	Event	Opposition Result	Opposition Result	Opposition Result	Opposition Result	Opposition Result	Rank
Taalaibek Kadiraliev	Bantamweight	Ngoudjo (CMR); W RSC R3	Vinson (USA); L 7–12	Did not advance			
Almazbek Raimkulov	Lightweight	Üitümen (MGL); W 15–4	Cruz (COL); W 12–2	Bejarano (MEX); L 12–14	Did not advance		
Nurbek Kasenov	Light middleweight	Yánes (VEN); L 12–20	Did not advance				
Vladislav Vizilter	Middleweight	Bye	Erdei (HUN); L RSC R3	Did not advance			
Aleksey Katulevsky	Light heavyweight	Odindo (KEN); W 11–2	Dovi (FRA); L RSC R4	Did not advance			

== Cycling ==
=== Road ===
Athlete	Event	Time	Rank
Eugen Wacker	Men's road race	DNF	
Eugen Wacker	Men's time trial	1:00:21.925	17

== Fencing ==
One male fencer represented Kyrgyzstan in 2000.

Athlete	Event	Round of 64	Round of 32	Round of 16	Quarterfinal	Semifinal	Final / BM	
Athlete	Event	Opposition Result	Opposition Result	Opposition Result	Opposition Result	Opposition Result	Opposition Result	Rank
Aleksandr Poddubny	Men's épée	Kajak (EST); W 15–13	Trevejo (CUB); L 10–15	Did not advance				

== Judo ==
Men

Athlete	Event	First round	Round of 32	Round of 16	Quarterfinal	Semifinal	Repechage 1	Repechage 2	Repechage 3	Repechage 4	Final / BM	
Athlete	Event	Opposition Result	Opposition Result	Opposition Result	Opposition Result	Opposition Result	Opposition Result	Opposition Result	Opposition Result	Opposition Result	Opposition Result	Rank
Aidyn Smagulov	Men's –60 kg	Bye	Lencina (ARG); W 1001–0001	Poulot (CUB); L 0010–1000	Did not advance		—N/a	Stanev (RUS); W 1010–0000	Kurdgelashvili (MDA); W 1101–0002	Greczkowski (USA); W 0200–0001	Bronze medal bout Mukhtarov (UZB); W 1011–0001	3rd place, bronze medalist(s)
Sagdat Sadykov	Men's –73 kg	Choi (KOR); L 0000–1001	Did not advance				Pedro (USA); L 0001–1101	Did not advance				
Vadim Sergeyev	Men's –100 kg	Bye	Hand (USA); L DQ	Did not advance								
Nataliya Kuligina	Women's –48 kg	—N/a	Dunn (GBR); L 0002–0011	Did not advance								
Olga Artamonova	Women's –63 kg	—N/a	Dixon (AUS); W 1000–0000	Li (CHN); L 0001–0110	Did not advance		—N/a		Vandecaveye (BEL); L 0000–1100	Did not advance		

== Shooting ==
Athlete	Event	Qualification		Final		Total	
Athlete	Event	Points	Rank	Points	Rank	Points	Rank
Yuri Lomov	Men's 50 m rifle three positions	1147	35	Did not advance			
Yuri Lomov	Men's 50 m rifle prone	589	35	Did not advance			
Yuri Lomov	Men's 10 m air rifle	589	15	Did not advance			
Yuri Melentiev	Men's 50 m pistol	542	34	Did not advance			
Yuri Melentiev	Men's 10 m air pistol	576	17	Did not advance			

== Swimming ==
Men

Athlete	Event	Heat		Semifinal		Final	
Athlete	Event	Time	Rank	Time	Rank	Time	Rank
Konstantin Andriushin	200 m butterfly	2:04.86	41	Did not advance			
Sergey Ashihmin	50 m freestyle	23.53	41	Did not advance			
Sergey Ashihmin	100 m freestyle	51.28	34	Did not advance			
Ivan Ivanov	400 m freestyle	4:09.33	45	—N/a		Did not advance	
Ivan Ivanov	1500 m freestyle	DQ		—N/a		Did not advance	
Dmitri Kuzmin	200 m freestyle	1:52.93	28	Did not advance			
Andrei Pakin	200 m individual medley	2:07.88	40	Did not advance			
Yevgeny Petrashov	100 m breaststroke	1:07.32	59	Did not advance			
Konstantin Priahin	100 m backstroke	59.86	49	Did not advance			
Alexander Tkachev	200 m breaststroke	2:15.63	15 Q	2:16.90	16	Did not advance	
Konstantin Ushkov	100 m butterfly	55.25	35	Did not advance			
Aleksandr Yegorov	200 m backstroke	2:13.86	44	Did not advance			
Sergey Ashihmin; Dmitri Kuzmin; Alexei Pavlov; Konstantin Ushkov	4 × 100 m freestyle relay	3:25.03	20	—N/a		Did not advance	
Ivan Ivanov; Dmitri Kuzmin; Andrei Pakin; Aleksandr Shilin	4 × 200 m freestyle relay	DQ		—N/a		Did not advance	
Aleksandr Shilin; Alexander Tkachev; Konstantin Ushkov; Sergey Ashihmin	4 × 100 m medley relay	3:46.70	19	—N/a		Did not advance	

Women

Athlete	Event	Heat		Semifinal		Final	
Athlete	Event	Time	Rank	Time	Rank	Time	Rank
Nataliya Korabelnikova	400 m freestyle	4:24.29	35	—N/a		Did not advance	
Anna Korshikova	200 m freestyle	2:08.08	35	Did not advance			
Olga Moltchanova	100 m breaststroke	1:14.41	34	Did not advance			
Olga Moltchanova	200 m breaststroke	2:41.43	33	Did not advance			
Anzhelika Solovyova	100 m backstroke	1:07.63	44	Did not advance			
Yekaterina Tochenaya	50 m freestyle	26.88	41	Did not advance			
Yekaterina Tochenaya	100 m freestyle	58.80	43	Did not advance			
Alexandra Zertsalova	200 m individual medley	2:24.09	32	Did not advance			
Alexandra Zertsalova	400 m individual medley	5:09.03	27	—N/a		Did not advance	
Nataliya Korabelnikova; Anna Korshikova; Anzhelika Solovyova; Yekaterina Tochenaya	4 × 200 m freestyle relay	8:41.21	14	—N/a		Did not advance	

== Weightlifting ==
Athlete	Event	Snatch		Clean & Jerk		Total	
Athlete	Event	Weight	Rank	Weight	Rank	Weight	Rank
Mital Sharipov	Men's –85 kg	155.0	15	190.0	16	345.0	16
Bakhyt Akhmetov	Men's –94 kg	175.0	10	192.5	18	367.5	15

== Wrestling ==
Key:

- TO – Victory by Fall.
- SP – Decision by technical superiority (10 points difference) – the loser with technical points
- ST – Decision by technical superiority (10 points difference) – the loser without technical points
- PP – Decision by Points – the loser with technical points.
- PO – Decision by Points – the loser without technical points.
- VA – Victory by injury.

Athlete	Event	Elimination pool				Quarterfinals	Semifinals	Final / BM	
Athlete	Event	Opposition Result	Opposition Result	Opposition Result	Rank	Opposition Result	Opposition Result	Opposition Result	Rank
Uran Kalilov	Greco-Roman –54 kg	Kalashnikov (UKR); L 0–3^{PO}	Abou El-Ela (EGY); W 3–1^{PP}	Mays (USA); W 4–0^{ST}	2	Did not advance			
Raatbek Sanatbayev	Greco-Roman –85 kg	Proovel (EST); L 1–3^{PP}	Vakhtangadze (GEO); L 1–3^{PP}	—N/a	3	Did not advance			
Nurdin Donbaev	Freestyle –54 kg	Kantoyeu (BLR); W 3–1^{PP}	García (CUB); L 1–3^{PP}	—N/a	2	Did not advance			
Maksat Boburbekov	Freestyle –63 kg	Hayrapetyan (ARM); L 1–3^{PP}	Savin (BLR); L 1–3^{PP}	—N/a	3	Did not advance			
Almaz Askarov	Freestyle –69 kg	Demchenko (BLR); L 0–3^{PO}	Veliyev (KAZ); W 4–0^{PA}	Johnston (AUS); W 4–0^{ST}	2	Did not advance			
Aleksandr Kovalevsky	Freestyle –130 kg	Medvedev (BLR); L 1–3^{PP}	Chen (CHN); W 3–1^{PP}	—N/a	2	Did not advance			

== Notes ==
- Wallechinsky, David (2004). The Complete Book of the Summer Olympics (Athens 2004 Edition). Toronto, Canada. ISBN 1-894963-32-6.
- International Olympic Committee (2001). The Results. Retrieved 12 November 2005.
- Sydney Organising Committee for the Olympic Games (2001). Official Report of the XXVII Olympiad Volume 1: Preparing for the Games. Retrieved 20 November 2005.
- Sydney Organising Committee for the Olympic Games (2001). Official Report of the XXVII Olympiad Volume 2: Celebrating the Games Archived 31 July 2012 at the Wayback Machine. Retrieved 20 November 2005.
- Sydney Organising Committee for the Olympic Games (2001). The Results. Retrieved 20 November 2005.
- International Olympic Committee Web Site
