= List of Kyrgyzstani records in swimming =

The Kyrgyzstani records in swimming are the fastest ever performances of swimmers from Kyrgyzstan, which are recognised and ratified by the Kyrgyz Republic Swimming Federation.

All records were set in finals unless noted otherwise.

== Long Course (50 m) ==
=== Men ===
Event	Time		Name	Club	Date	Meet	Location	Ref
50 m freestyle	22.88	h	Sergey Ashukhmin	Kyrgyzstan	3 September 1995	Universiade	Fukuoka, Japan	
100 m freestyle	51.07	h	Sergey Ashukhmin	Kyrgyzstan	22 July 1996	Olympic Games	Atlanta, United States	
200 m freestyle	1:52.93		Dmitri Kuzmin	Kyrgyzstan	17 September 2000	Olympic Games	Sydney, Australia	
400 m freestyle	3:58.70		Sergey Krishin	-	9 April 1986	USSR National Championships	Soviet Union	
800 m freestyle	8:15.66		Daniel Nasredinov	Kyrgyzstan	19 July 2026	Asian Age Group Championships	Samutprakan, Thailand	
1500 m freestyle	15:38.88		Sergey Krishin	-	11 April 1986	USSR National Championships	Soviet Union	
50 m backstroke	27.81		Iurii Zakharov	Kyrgyzstan	11 August 2009	Asian Age Group Championships	Japan	
100 m backstroke	57.88		Alexandr Shilin	Kyrgyzstan	17 September 2000	Olympic Games	Sydney, Australia	
200 m backstroke	2:07.07		Iurii Zakharov	Kyrgyzstan	30 July 2009	World Championships	Rome, Italy	
50 m breaststroke	26.94		Denis Petrashov	University of Louisville	2 May 2025	TYR Pro Swim Series	Fort Lauderdale, United States	
100 m breaststroke	58.88		Denis Petrashov	Kyrgyzstan	28 July 2025	World Championships	Singapore, Singapore	
200 m breaststroke	2:08.67		Denis Petrashov	Kyrgyzstan	24 September 2026	Asian Games	Tokyo, Japan	
50m butterfly	24.83		Vladislav Shuliko	Kyrgyzstan	6 March 2020	Grand Prix Slovakia	Bratislava, Slovakia	
100m butterfly	54.59		Vladislav Shuliko	Kyrgyzstan	8 March 2020	Grand Prix Slovakia	Bratislava, Slovakia	
200m butterfly	2:01.59	h	Konstantin Andriushin	Kyrgyzstan	22 July 1996	Olympic Games	Atlanta, United States	
200m individual medley	2:05.84	h	Vasilii Danilov	Kyrgyzstan	11 August 2009	Asian Age Group Championships	Japan	
400m individual medley	4:28.66	h	Vasilii Danilov	Kyrgyzstan	11 August 2009	Asian Age Group Championships	Japan	
4×100m freestyle relay	3:25.03	h	Sergey Ashihmin (51.65); Konstantin Ushkov (50.04); Dmitri Kuzmin (50.61); Alexei Pavlov (52.73)	Kyrgyzstan	22 September 2000	Olympic Games	Sydney, Australia	
4×200m freestyle relay	8:00.00	h	Sergey Ashihmin (2:03.05); Andrey Kvassov (1:53.91); Dmitry Lapin (1:56.01); Vitaly Vasilyev (2:07.03)	Kyrgyzstan	21 July 1996	Olympic Games	Atlanta, United States	
4×100m medley relay	3:46.70	h	Aleksandr Shilin (57.88); Alexander Tkachev (1:03.69); Konstantin Ushkov (54.05); Sergey Ashihmin (51.08)	Kyrgyzstan	22 September 2000	Olympic Games	Sydney, Australia	

Legend: # – Record awaiting ratification by Kyrgyz Republic Swimming Federation; WR – World record; AS – Asian record;
Records not set in finals: h – heat; sf – semifinal; r – relay 1st leg; rh – relay heat 1st leg; b – B final; † – en route to final mark; so – swim-off; tt – time trial

=== Women ===
Event	Time		Name	Club	Date	Meet	Location	Ref
50m freestyle	26.26	h	Elizaveta Pecherskikh	Kyrgyzstan	3 August 2024	Olympic Games	Paris, France	
100m freestyle	58.04	h	Aiymkyz Aidaralieva	Kyrgyzstan	22 September 2026	Asian Games	Tokyo, Japan	
200m freestyle	2:05.23	h	Aiymkyz Aidaralieva	Kyrgyzstan	21 September 2026	Asian Games	Tokyo, Japan	
400m freestyle	4:24.29		Nataliya Korabelnikova	Kyrgyzstan	17 September 2000	Olympic Games	Sydney, Australia	
800m freestyle	9:01.97		Nina Bunina	Kyrgyzstan	1 January 1982	USSR National Championships	Moscow, Soviet Union	
1500m freestyle	17:54.45		Anna Nikishkina	Aer Lingus	12 April 2025	Irish Championships	Dublin, Ireland	
50m backstroke	29.62		Elizaveta Rogozhnikova	Kyrgyzstan	17 April 2021	Kazakhstan Open Championships	Aktobe, Kazakhstan	
100m backstroke	1:03.82		Elizaveta Rogozhnikova	Kyrgyzstan	26 September 2019	Asian Age Group Championships	Bangalore, India	
200m backstroke	2:17.21		Elizaveta Rogozhnikova	Kyrgyzstan	27 September 2019	Asian Age Group Championships	Bangalore, India	
50m breaststroke	32.25		Daria Talanova	Kyrgyzstan	23 April 2014	1st Dubai International Aquatic	Dubai, United Arab Emirates	
100m breaststroke	1:10.36		Daria Talanova	Kyrgyzstan	23 April 2014	1st Dubai International Aquatic	Dubai, United Arab Emirates	
200m breaststroke	2:31.54		Daria Talanova	Kyrgyzstan	23 April 2014	1st Dubai International Aquatic	Dubai, United Arab Emirates	
50m butterfly	28.21		Elizaveta Rogozhnikova	Kyrgyzstan	1 April 2022	Kazakhstan Open Championships	Aktobe, Kazakhstan	
100m butterfly	1:04.68		Elizaveta Rogozhnikova	Kyrgyzstan	23 June 2018	43rd Internationales Stuttgarter Schwimmfest	Stuttgart, Germany	
200m butterfly	2:28.11		Elizaveta Rogozhnikova	Kyrgyzstan	16 April 1985	USSR Championships	Moscow, Soviet Union	
200m individual medley	2:23.49		Elizaveta Rogozhnikova	Kyrgyzstan	23 August 2019	World Junior Championships	Budapest, Hungary	
400m individual medley	5:01.48		Elizaveta Rogozhnikova	Kyrgyzstan	25 September 2019	Asian Age Group Championships	Bangalore, India	
4×100m freestyle relay								
4×200m freestyle relay	8:41.21		Nataliya Korabelnikova (2:06.99); Ekaterina Tochenaya (2:15.59); Anna Korshikova (2:10.56); Anjelika Solovieva (2:08.07)	Kyrgyzstan	22 September 2000	Olympic Games	Sydney, Australia	
4×100m medley relay								

Legend: # – Record awaiting ratification by Kyrgyz Republic Swimming Federation; WR – World record; AS – Asian record;
Records not set in finals: h – heat; sf – semifinal; r – relay 1st leg; rh – relay heat 1st leg; b – B final; † – en route to final mark; so – swim-off; tt – time trial

== Short Course (25 m) ==
=== Men ===
Event	Time		Name	Club	Date	Meet	Location	Ref
50 m freestyle	22.23		Sergey Ashihmin	Kyrgyzstan	1 February 1997	World Cup	Gelsenkirchen, Germany	
100 m freestyle	48.93	h	Sergey Ashihmin	Kyrgyzstan	2 February 1997	World Cup	Gelsenkirchen, Germany	
200 m freestyle	1:50.07		Vasilii Danilov	Kyrgyzstan	6 November 2009	Asian Indoor Games	Hanoi, Vietnam	
400 m freestyle	3:51.84	h	Alexandr Shilin	Kyrgyzstan	9 November 2007	World Cup	Moscow, Russia	
800 m freestyle	8:02.29		Daniel Nasredinov	Kyrgyzstan	9 October 2026	World Cup	Tashkent, Uzbekistan	
1500 m freestyle	15:49.00		Sergey Krishin	-	1986	-	Hungary	
50 m backstroke	26.91		Aleksandr Egorov	Kyrgyzstan	16 November 2000	World Cup	College Park, United States	
100 m backstroke	56.83		Iurii Zakharov	Kyrgyzstan	26 October 2007	Asian Indoor Games	Macau, Macau	
200 m backstroke	2:03.87	h	Iurii Zakharov	Kyrgyzstan	13 April 2008	World Championships	Manchester, Great Britain	
50 m breaststroke	26.21	†	Denis Petrashov	Kyrgyzstan	12 December 2024	World Championships	Budapest, Hungary	
100 m breaststroke	55.91		Denis Petrashov	Kyrgyzstan	12 December 2024	World Championships	Budapest, Hungary	
200 m breaststroke	2:05.39		Denis Petrashov	Kyrgyzstan	30 October 2021	World Cup	Kazan, Russia	
50m butterfly	25.20	h	Vladislav Shuliko	Kyrgyzstan	14 December 2018	World Championships	Hangzhou, China	
50m butterfly	24.34	#	Vladislav Shuliko	-	2020	Kyrgyzstani Championships	Bishkek, Kyrgyzstan	
100m butterfly	55.43	h	Vladislav Shuliko	Kyrgyzstan	12 December 2018	World Championships	Hangzhou, China	
100m butterfly	54.28	#	Vladislav Shuliko	-	2020	Kyrgyzstani Championships	Bishkek, Kyrgyzstan	
200m butterfly	2:00.94		Konstantin Andriushin	Kyrgyzstan	8 February 1997	World Cup	Paris, France	
100m individual medley	56.46		Vasilii Danilov	Kyrgyzstan	3 July 2013	Asian Indoor and Martial Arts Games	Incheon, South Korea	
200m individual medley	2:01.35		Vasilii Danilov	Kyrgyzstan	4 November 2009	Asian Indoor Games	Hanoi, Vietnam	
400m individual medley	4:19.01	h	Vasilii Danilov	Kyrgyzstan	10 April 2008	World Championships	Manchester, Great Britain	
4×50m freestyle relay	1:34.46	h	Vasilii Daniliv (23.54); Stanislav Karnaukhov; Aleksandr Slepchenko; Dmitrii Aleksandrov	Kyrgyzstan	2 July 2013	Asian Indoor and Martial Arts Games	Incheon, South Korea	
4×100m freestyle relay								
4×200m freestyle relay								
4×50m medley relay	1:47.42	h	Vasilii Danilov (29.06); Dmitrii Aleksandrov; Aleksandr Slepchenko; Stanislav Karnaukhov	Kyrgyzstan	30 June 2013	Asian Indoor and Martial Arts Games	Incheon, South Korea	
4×100m medley relay	3:54.79		Vasilii Danilov (1:00.23); Dmitrii Aleksandrov; Aleksandr Slepchenko; Stanislav Karnaukhov	Kyrgyzstan	3 July 2013	Asian Indoor and Martial Arts Games	Incheon, South Korea	

Legend: # – Record awaiting ratification by Kyrgyz Republic Swimming Federation; WR – World record; AS – Asian record;
Records not set in finals: h – heat; sf – semifinal; r – relay 1st leg; rh – relay heat 1st leg; b – B final; † – en route to final mark; so – swim-off; tt – time trial

=== Women ===
Event	Time		Name	Club	Date	Meet	Location	Ref
50 m freestyle	25.83	h	Elizaveta Pecherskikh	Kyrgyzstan	14 December 2024	World Championships	Budapest, Hungary	
100 m freestyle	57.54	b	Elizaveta Pecherskikh	Kyrgyzstan	20 December 2024	Vladimir Salnikov Cup	Saint Petersburg, Russia	
200 m freestyle	2:05.41	h	Elizaveta Rogozhnikova	Kyrgyzstan	11 December 2018	World Championships	Hangzhou, China	
400 m freestyle	4:28.27	h	Elizaveta Rogozhnikova	Kyrgyzstan	21 December 2019	Vladimir Salnikov Cup	Saint Petersburg, Russia	
800 m freestyle	9:09.26		Anna Nikishkina	Aer Lingus	13 December 2024	Irish Championships	Dublin, Ireland	
1500 m freestyle	17:30.88		Anna Nikishkina	Aer Lingus	14 December 2024	Irish Championships	Dublin, Ireland	
50 m backstroke	28.59	rh	Elizaveta Pecherskikh	Kyrgyzstan	11 December 2024	World Championships	Budapest, Hungary	
100 m backstroke	1:02.91		Elizaveta Rogozhnikova	-	2021	Kyrgyzstani Championships	Bishkek, Kyrgyzstan	
200 m backstroke	2:17.24		Elizaveta Rogozhnikova	Kyrgyzstan	21 December 2019	Vladimir Salnikov Cup	Saint Petersburg, Russia	
50 m breaststroke	31.89		Daria Talanova	-	2014	Kyrgyzstani Championships	Bishkek, Kyrgyzstan	
100 m breaststroke	1:08.96		Daria Talanova	-	2014	Kyrgyzstani Championships	Bishkek, Kyrgyzstan	
200 m breaststroke	2:31.31		Daria Talanova	-	2014	Kyrgyzstani Championships	Bishkek, Kyrgyzstan	
50 m butterfly	27.80	h	Elizaveta Pecherskikh	Kyrgyzstan	10 December 2024	World Championships	Budapest, Hungary	
100 m butterfly	1:03.74		Elizaveta Rogozhnikova	-	2021	Kyrgyzstani Championships	Bishkek, Kyrgyzstan	
200 m butterfly	2:25.40		Marina Arzamastseva	-	1986	-	Novotroitsk, Soviet Union	
100 m individual medley	1:06.67		Elizaveta Rogozhnikova	-	2019	-	Khanty-Mansiysk, Russia	
200 m individual medley	2:23.38		Elizaveta Rogozhnikova	-	2020	Kyrgyzstani Championships	Bishkek, Kyrgyzstan	
400 m individual medley								
4×50 m freestyle relay								
4×100 m freestyle relay								
4×200 m freestyle relay								
4×50 m medley relay								
4×100 m medley relay								

Legend: # – Record awaiting ratification by Kyrgyz Republic Swimming Federation; WR – World record; AS – Asian record;
Records not set in finals: h – heat; sf – semifinal; r – relay 1st leg; rh – relay heat 1st leg; b – B final; † – en route to final mark; so – swim-off; tt – time trial
