= Judo at the 1996 Summer Olympics – Men's 60 kg =

Judo competition

Men's 60 kg at the Games of the XXVI Olympiad
- Venue: Georgia World Congress Center
- Date: 26 July 1996
- Competitors: 34 from 34 nations

Medalists
| 1st place, gold medalist(s) | | Tadahiro Nomura | Japan |
| 2nd place, silver medalist(s) | | Girolamo Giovinazzo | Italy |
| 3rd place, bronze medalist(s) | | Richard Trautmann | Germany |
| 3rd place, bronze medalist(s) | | Dorjpalamyn Narmandakh | Mongolia |

These are the results of the Men's 60 kg (also known as Extra-Lightweight) competition in judo at the 1996 Summer Olympics in Atlanta, Georgia. A total of 34 men competed in this event, limited to jūdōka whose body weight was less than, or equal to, 60 kilograms. Competition took place in the Georgia World Congress Center.

== Tournament results ==
=== First round ===
As there were more than 32 qualifiers for the tournament, two first round matches were held to reduce the field to 32 judoka.

- Pedro Caravana (POR) defeated Ewan Beaton (CAN)
- Narender Singh (IND) defeated Sean Sullivan (IRL)

=== Main bracket ===
The gold and silver medalists were determined by the final match of the main single-elimination bracket.

1st Round
Meridja (ALG) | W
Nováček (CZE) | L
Naveira (ESP) | W
Liao (TPE) | L
Oyegin (RUS) | W
Ayed (TUN) | L
Nomura (JPN) | W
Gutiérrez (HON) | L
Méndez (PUR) | L
Narmandakh (MGL) | W
Caravana (POR) | L
Donohue (GBR) | W
Idrissi Chorfi (MAR) | W
Bokiyev (TJK) | L
Mukhtarov (UZB) | W
García (BRA) | L
Matuszek (SVK) | L
Chambilly (FRA) | W
Vazagashvili (GEO) | L
Giovinazzo (ITA) | W
Lencina (ARG) | L
Guseynov (AZE) | W
Acuña (MEX) | W
Power (AUS) | L
Sunada (USA) | L
Trautmann (GER) | W
Bagirov (BLR) | W
Singh (IND) | L
Poulot (CUB) | L
Kim (KOR) | W
Kamrowski (POL) | W
Kunyik (HUN) | L

2nd Round
Meridja (ALG) | W
Naveira (ESP) | L
Oyegin (RUS) | L
Nomura (JPN) | W
Narmandakh (MGL) | W
Donohue (GBR) | L
Idrissi Chorfi (MAR) | L
Mukhtarov (UZB) | W
Chambilly (FRA) | L
Giovinazzo (ITA) | W
Guseynov (AZE) | L
Acuña (MEX) | W
Trautmann (GER) | W
Bagirov (BLR) | L
Kim (KOR) | W
Kamrowski (POL) | L

Quarterfinals
Meridja (ALG) | L
Nomura (JPN) | W
Narmandakh (MGL) | W
Mukhtarov (UZB) | L
Giovinazzo (ITA) | W
Acuña (MEX) | L
Trautmann (GER) | W
Kim (KOR) | L

Semifinals
Nomura (JPN) | W
Narmandakh (MGL) | L
Giovinazzo (ITA) | W
Trautmann (GER) | L

Gold medal final
Nomura (JPN) | W
Giovinazzo (ITA) | L

=== Repechage ===
The losing semifinalists as well as those judoka eliminated in earlier rounds by the four semifinalists of the main bracket advanced to the repechage. These matches determined the two bronze medalists for the event.

First round
Gutiérrez (HON) | L
Oyegin (RUS) | W
Méndez (PUR) | L
Donohue (GBR) | W
Vazagashvili (GEO) | W
Chambilly (FRA)
Sunada (USA) | L
Bagirov (BLR) | W

Second round
Oyegin (RUS) | W
Meridja (ALG) | L
Donohue (GBR) | W
Mukhtarov (UZB) | L
Vazagashvili (GEO) | W
Acuña (MEX) | L
Bagirov (BLR) | W
Kim (KOR) | L

Third round
Oyegin (RUS) | W
Donohue (GBR) | L
Vazagashvili (GEO) | L
Bagirov (BLR) | W

Bronze medal finals
Oyegin (RUS) | L
Trautmann (GER) | W
Bagirov (BLR) | L
Narmandakh (MGL) | W
