= Leonardo Carcamo =

Honduran judoka

Leonardo Cárcamo
Personal information
- Full name: Leonardo Cárcamo Gutiérrez
- Nationality: Honduran
- Born: 6 November 1965 (age 60)

Sport
- Sport: Judo

Leonardo Cárcamo Gutiérrez (born 6 November 1965) is a Honduran judoka. As an athlete, he represented Honduras in international competition. He was coached by Ernesto Taillacq who had also coached multiple Honduran judokas. He competed for Honduras at the 1996 Summer Olympics in the men's extra-lightweight event. Overall, he placed equal thirteenth alongside three other competitors.

== Biography ==
Leonardo Cárcamo Gutiérrez was born on 6 November 1965. As an athlete, he represented Honduras in international competition. Cárcamo competed in the sport of judo. He was coached by Ernesto Taillacq, who had also coached multiple Honduran judokas who have competed at the Olympics such as Dora Maldonado and Kenny Godoy.

Cárcamo was selected to compete for Honduras at the 1996 Summer Olympics held in Atlanta, United States. At the 1996 Summer Games, he competed in one event, the men's extra-lightweight event for competitors that weighed 60 kilograms (130 lb) or less. He received a bye in the first round and was then matched against Tadahiro Nomura of Japan for the second round. They competed on 26 July 1996 where Cárcamo was defeated by Nomura by ippon. Nomura eventually won the gold medal in the event. Cárcamo was eventually moved to the repechage round as a second chance to medal in the event. He went up against Nikolay Ozhegin of Russia in the same day. There, Cárcamo was again defeated by ippon and was out of contention to medal. Overall, he placed equal thirteenth alongside three other judokas, namely: Franck Chambilly of France, Melvin Méndez of Puerto Rico, and Clifton Sunada of the United States.
