= Judo at the 2000 Summer Olympics – Men's 60 kg =

Judo competition

Men's 60 kg at the Games of the XXVII Olympiad
- Venue: Sydney Convention and Exhibition Centre
- Date: 16 September 2000
- Competitors: 34 from 34 nations

Medalists
1st place, gold medalist(s)		Tadahiro Nomura	Japan
2nd place, silver medalist(s)		Jung Bu-kyung	South Korea
3rd place, bronze medalist(s)		Manolo Poulot	Cuba
3rd place, bronze medalist(s)		Aidyn Smagulov	Kyrgyzstan

Men's 60 kg competition in judo at the 2000 Summer Olympics was held on 16 September at the Sydney Convention and Exhibition Centre.

This event was the lightest of the men's judo weight classes, limiting competitors to a maximum of 60 kilograms of body mass. Like all other judo events, bouts lasted five minutes. If the bout was still tied at the end, it was extended for another five-minute, sudden-death period; if neither judoka scored during that period, the match is decided by the judges. The tournament bracket consisted of a single-elimination contest culminating in a gold medal match. There was also a repechage to determine the winners of the two bronze medals. Each judoka who had lost to a semifinalist competed in the repechage. The two judokas who lost in the semifinals faced the winner of the opposite half of the bracket's repechage in bronze medal bouts.

== Schedule ==
All times are Australian Eastern Daylight Time (UTC+11:00)

Date	Time	Round
Saturday, 16 September 2000	15:00; 20:30	Preliminaries & Repechage; Final

== Tournament results ==
=== Final ===
Final
1	Jung Bu-kyung (KOR)	0000
2	Tadahiro Nomura (JPN)	1000

=== Mat 1 ===
First round matches

	Score	
Brendon Crooks (NZL)	0001–1012	Elchin Ismayilov (AZE)

Elimination rounds

Round of 32
Dorjpalamyn Narmandakh (MGL)	0100
Reiver Alvarenga (VEN)	0001
Nestor Khergiani (GEO)	0001
Jung Bu-kyung (KOR)	1110
Oliver Gussenberg (GER)	0010
Bazarbek Donbay (KAZ)	1100
John Buchanan (GBR)	0010
Óscar Peñas (ESP)	0110
Natik Bagirov (BLR)	0101
Denílson Lourenço (BRA)	0100
Elchin Ismayilov (AZE)	1000
David Moret (SUI)	0001
Alisher Mukhtarov (UZB)	1000
Francis Labrosse (SEY)	0000
Omar Rebahi (ALG)	0010
Juan Carlos Jacinto (DOM)	0010

Round of 16
Dorjpalamyn Narmandakh (MGL)	0001
Jung Bu-kyung (KOR)	1020
Bazarbek Donbay (KAZ)	0110
Óscar Peñas (ESP)	0010
Natik Bagirov (BLR)	0010
Elchin Ismayilov (AZE)	1100
Alisher Mukhtarov (UZB)	1001
Omar Rebahi (ALG)	0000

Quarterfinals
Jung Bu-kyung (KOR)	1001
Bazarbek Donbay (KAZ)	0000
Elchin Ismayilov (AZE)	0011
Alisher Mukhtarov (UZB)	W1010

Semifinals
Jung Bu-kyung (KOR)	0010
Alisher Mukhtarov (UZB)	0000

=== Mat 2 ===
First round matches

	Score	
Ruslan Mirzaliyev (UKR)	0010–0112	Cédric Taymans (BEL)

Elimination rounds

Round of 32
Cédric Taymans (BEL)	0000
Brandan Greczkowski (USA)	1000
Jia Yunbing (CHN)	0000
Tadahiro Nomura (JPN)	1000
Marek Matuszek (SVK)	1001
Vardan Voskanyan (ARM)	0010
Adrian Robertson (AUS)	0010
Makrem Ayed (TUN)	1110
Aidyn Smagulov (KGZ)	1001
Jorge Lencina (ARG)	0001
Manolo Poulot (CUB)	1001
Evgeny Stanev (RUS)	0000
Abdelouahed Idrissi Chorfi (MAR)	0000
Eric Despezelle (FRA)	0200
Juan Barahona (ECU)	0000
Giorgi Kurdgelashvili (MDA)	1000

Round of 16
Brandan Greczkowski (USA)	0000
Tadahiro Nomura (JPN)	1001
Marek Matuszek (SVK)	1000
Makrem Ayed (TUN)	0000
Aidyn Smagulov (KGZ)	0010
Manolo Poulot (CUB)	1000
Eric Despezelle (FRA)	0000
Giorgi Kurdgelashvili (MDA)	0000

Quarterfinals
Tadahiro Nomura (JPN)	1000
Marek Matuszek (SVK)	0000
Manolo Poulot (CUB)	1000
Giorgi Kurdgelashvili (MDA)	0000

Semifinals
Tadahiro Nomura (JPN)	0010
Manolo Poulot (CUB)	0002

=== Repechage ===
The losing semifinalists as well as those judoka eliminated in earlier rounds by the four semifinalists of the main bracket advanced to the repechage. These matches determined the two bronze medalists for the event.

First round
Nestor Khergiani (GEO)	1121
Dorjpalamyn Narmandakh (MGL)	0000
Francis Labrosse (SEY)	0001
Omar Rebahi (ALG)	1011
Jia Yunbing (CHN)	0001
Brandan Greczkowski (USA)	1000
Evgeny Stanev (RUS)	0000
Aidyn Smagulov (KGZ)	1010

Second round
Nestor Khergiani (GEO)	0010
Bazarbek Donbay (KAZ)	0110
Omar Rebahi (ALG)	0000
Elchin Ismayilov (AZE)	1010
Brandan Greczkowski (USA)	1000
Marek Matuszek (SVK)	0000
Aidyn Smagulov (KGZ)	1101
Giorgi Kurdgelashvili (MDA)	0002

Third round
Bazarbek Donbay (KAZ)	0100
Elchin Ismayilov (AZE)	0001
Brandan Greczkowski (USA)	0001
Aidyn Smagulov (KGZ)	0200

Bronze medal finals
Bazarbek Donbay (KAZ)	0000
Manolo Poulot (CUB)	0210
Aidyn Smagulov (KGZ)	1011
Alisher Mukhtarov (UZB)	0001
