= Swimming at the 2000 Summer Olympics – Men's 4 × 100 metre medley relay =

Men's 4 × 100 metre medley relay at the Games of the XXVII Olympiad
- Venue: Sydney International Aquatic Centre
- Date: September 22, 2000 (heats); September 23, 2000 (final)
- Competitors: 102 from 24 nations
- Teams: 24
- Winning time: 3:33.73 WR

Medalists
1st place, gold medalist(s)		Lenny Krayzelburg, Ed Moses, Ian Crocker, Gary Hall, Jr., Neil Walker*, Tommy Hannan*, Jason Lezak*	United States
2nd place, silver medalist(s)		Matt Welsh, Regan Harrison, Geoff Huegill, Michael Klim, Josh Watson*, Ryan Mitchell*, Adam Pine*, Ian Thorpe*	Australia
3rd place, bronze medalist(s)		Stev Theloke, Jens Kruppa, Thomas Rupprath, Torsten Spanneberg; *Indicates the swimmer only competed in the preliminary heats.	Germany

The men's 4 × 100 metre medley relay event at the 2000 Summer Olympics took place on 22–23 September at the Sydney International Aquatic Centre in Sydney, Australia.

Having not lost the event once in Olympic competition since its inception in 1960, the U.S. team dominated the race from the start to demolish a four-year-old world record and most importantly, to defend their Olympic title. Lenny Krayzelburg (53.87), Ed Moses (59.84), Ian Crocker (52.10), and Gary Hall, Jr. (47.92, an American record) put together a blazing fast finish of 3:33.73 to cut off their own standard by 1.11 seconds. Moses also produced a mighty effort in the breaststroke leg as he became the first ever swimmer to record a sub one-minute barrier split. After accepting their gold medals in front of the Aussie home crowd, the U.S. men unfurled a banner reading: "Sydney 2000. In our hearts forever. Thanks Australia."

The Aussie team of Matt Welsh (54.29), Regan Harrison (1:01.48), Geoff Huegill (51.33), and Michael Klim (48.17) finished behind their greatest rivals by a couple of seconds, but made a surprise packet with the silver in an Oceanian record of 3:35.27. Meanwhile, Stev Theloke (55.07), Jens Kruppa (1:00.52), Thomas Rupprath (52.14), and Torsten Spanneberg (48.15) earned their first medley relay medal for Germany since the nation's reunification in 1990, taking home the bronze in a European record of 3:35.88.

Netherlands' Klaas-Erik Zwering (56.83), Marcel Wouda (1:01.20), Joris Keizer (52.26), and anchor Pieter van den Hoogenband (47.24, the fastest split of the race) missed the podium by more than a full body length over the Germans with a fourth-place time of 3:37.53. Hungary (3:39.03), Canada (3:39.88), France (3:40.02), and Great Britain (3:40.19) completed a close finish at the rear of the championship finale.

== Records ==
Prior to this competition, the existing world and Olympic records were as follows.

World record	United States (USA); Jeff Rouse (53.95); Jeremy Linn (1:00.32); Mark Henderson (52.39); Gary Hall, Jr. (48.18)	3:34.84	Atlanta, United States	26 July 1996
Olympic record	United States; Jeff Rouse (53.95); Jeremy Linn (1:00.32); Mark Henderson (52.39); Gary Hall, Jr. (48.18)	3:34.84	Atlanta, United States	26 July 1996

The following new world and Olympic records were set during this competition.

Date	Event	Name	Nationality	Time	Record
September 23	Final	Lenny Krayzelburg (53.87); Ed Moses (59.84); Ian Crocker (52.10); Gary Hall, Jr. (47.92)	United States	3:33.73	WR

== Results ==
=== Heats ===
Rank	Heat	Lane	Nation	Swimmers	Time	Notes
1	3	3	Germany	Stev Theloke (55.54); Jens Kruppa (1:01.39); Thomas Rupprath (52.39); Torsten Spanneberg (49.18)	3:38.50	Q, NR
2	1	7	Hungary	Péter Horváth (55.74); Károly Güttler (1:01.52); Zsolt Gáspár (52.36); Attila Zubor (48.96)	3:38.58	Q, NR
3	3	4	United States	Neil Walker (55.10); Ed Moses (1:01.34); Tommy Hannan (53.32); Jason Lezak (48.83)	3:38.59	Q
4	2	4	Australia	Josh Watson (55.39); Ryan Mitchell (1:02.29); Adam Pine (52.87); Ian Thorpe (48.83)	3:39.38	Q
5	3	5	Great Britain	Neil Willey (56.13); Darren Mew (1:01.01); James Hickman (52.84); Sion Brinn (49.62)	3:39.60	Q
6	2	5	Netherlands	Klaas-Erik Zwering (56.99); Marcel Wouda (1:01.74); Joris Keizer (52.24); Mark Veens (49.13)	3:40.10	Q
7	1	6	France	Simon Dufour (55.82); Hugues Duboscq (1:02.16); Franck Esposito (52.60); Frédérick Bousquet (49.73)	3:40.31	Q
8	1	5	Canada	Chris Renaud (56.26); Morgan Knabe (1:00.88); Shamek Pietucha (53.27); Yannick Lupien (50.15)	3:40.56	Q
9	1	4	Russia	Vladislav Aminov (56.53); Dmitry Komornikov (1:01.70); Igor Marchenko (53.75); Denis Pimankov (48.85)	3:40.83	
10	1	3	Sweden	Mattias Ohlin (57.05); Martin Gustavsson (1:01.86); Daniel Carlsson (53.30); Stefan Nystrand (48.67)	3:40.88	
11	3	6	Ukraine	Volodymyr Nikolaychuk (56.41); Oleg Lisogor (1:01.84); Denys Sylantyev (52.99); Vyacheslav Shyrshov (49.81)	3:41.05	
12	2	3	Brazil	Alexandre Massura (55.83); Eduardo Fischer (1:03.49); Fernando Scherer (53.80); Gustavo Borges (49.19)	3:42.31	
13	2	1	South Africa	Simon Thirsk (56.88); Brett Petersen (1:02.51); Theo Verster (53.52); Nicholas Folker (49.53)	3:42.44	AF
14	3	8	Croatia	Gordan Kožulj (56.52); Vanja Rogulj (1:02.19); Miloš Milošević (54.08); Duje Draganja (49.94)	3:42.73	NR
15	3	2	Spain	David Ortega (55.68); Santiago Castellanos (1:03.15); Daniel Morales (53.91); Javier Botello (50.02)	3:42.76	
16	1	2	Switzerland	Philipp Gilgen (57.31); Remo Lütolf (1:01.64); Philippe Meyer (53.95); Karel Novy (49.88)	3:42.78	NR
17	2	7	Israel	Eithan Urbach (56.12); Tal Stricker (1:02.65); Yoav Meiri (54.54); Yoav Bruck (50.08)	3:43.39	NR
18	3	7	Argentina	Eduardo Germán Otero (58.00); Sergio Andres Ferreyra (1:02.73); Pablo Martín Abal (53.96); José Meolans (48.92)	3:43.61	
19	1	8	Kyrgyzstan	Aleksandr Shilin (57.88); Alexander Tkachev (1:03.69); Konstantin Ushkov (54.05); Sergey Ashihmin (51.08)	3:46.70	NR
20	3	1	Cuba	Rodolfo Falcón (55.97); Gunter Rodríguez (1:05.40); Yohan García (55.65); Marcos Hernández (49.86)	3:46.88	
21	2	8	China	Fu Yong (58.34); Zhu Yi (1:03.35); Ouyang Kunpeng (53.96); Xie Xufeng (51.72)	3:47.37	
22	1	1	Malaysia	Alex Lim (58.48); Elvin Chia (1:03.18); Anthony Ang (55.70); Allen Ong (50.96)	3:48.32	
	2	6	Finland	Jani Sievinen (56.49); Jarno Pihlava; Tero Välimaa; Jere Hård	DSQ	
	2	2	Poland		DNS	

=== Final ===
Rank	Lane	Nation	Swimmers	Time	Time behind	Notes
1st place, gold medalist(s)	3	United States	Lenny Krayzelburg (53.87); Ed Moses (59.84); Ian Crocker (52.10); Gary Hall, Jr. (47.92)	3:33.73		WR
2nd place, silver medalist(s)	2	Australia	Matt Welsh (54.29); Regan Harrison (1:01.48); Geoff Huegill (51.33); Michael Klim (48.17)	3:35.27	1.54	OC
3rd place, bronze medalist(s)	4	Germany	Stev Theloke (55.07); Jens Kruppa (1:00.52); Thomas Rupprath (52.14); Torsten Spanneberg (48.15)	3:35.88	2.15	EU
4	7	Netherlands	Klaas-Erik Zwering (56.83); Marcel Wouda (1:01.20); Joris Keizer (52.26); Pieter van den Hoogenband (47.24)	3:37.53	3.80	NR
5	5	Hungary	Péter Horváth (55.90); Károly Güttler (1:01.23); Zsolt Gáspár (52.95); Attila Zubor (49.01)	3:39.09	5.36	
6	8	Canada	Chris Renaud (55.66); Morgan Knabe (1:01.23); Mike Mintenko (52.66); Craig Hutchison (50.33)	3:39.88	6.15	
7	1	France	Simon Dufour (55.67); Hugues Duboscq (1:01.69); Franck Esposito (52.80); Frédérick Bousquet (49.86)	3:40.02	6.29	
8	6	Great Britain	Neil Willey (56.49); Darren Mew (1:01.76); James Hickman (52.53); Sion Brinn (49.41)	3:40.19	6.46	
