= List of Swiss records in swimming =

The Swiss Records in swimming are the fastest times ever swum by an individual from Switzerland. These records are maintained by Switzerland's national swimming federation: Schweizerischer Schwimmverband.

The federation recognizes/tracks records for both long course (50m) and short course (25m) pools, in the following events (by stroke):

- freestyle: 50, 100, 200, 400, 800, 1500, and (50m only) 5000 .
- backstroke: 50, 100 and 200
- breaststroke: 50, 100 and 200
- butterfly: 50, 100 and 200
- individual medley (I.M.): 100 (25m only), 200 and 400
- relays (national): 4 × 50 free (25m only), 4 × 100 free, 4 × 200 free, 4 × 50 medley (25m only), 4 × 100 medley
- relays (club teams): 4 × 50 free, 4 × 100 free, 4 × 200 free, 4 × 100 back, 4 × 200 back, 4 × 100 breast, 4 × 200 breast, 4 × 100 fly, 4 × 200 fly, 4 × 50 medley, and 4 × 100 medley

== Long Course (50 m) ==
=== Men ===
Event	Time		Name	Club	Date	Meet	Location	Ref
50 m freestyle	22.06		Flori Lang	SC Uster Wallisellen	12 April 2009	Danish Championships	Esbjerg, Denmark	
100 m freestyle	48.20	r	Roman Mityukov	Switzerland	17 May 2021	European Championships	Budapest, Hungary	
200 m freestyle	1:45.32	sf	Antonio Djakovic	Switzerland	14 August 2022	European Championships	Rome, Italy	
400 m freestyle	3:43.93		Antonio Djakovic	Switzerland	17 August 2022	European Championships	Rome, Italy	
800 m freestyle	7:58.01		Antonio Djakovic	SC Uster	19 January 2024	Geneve International Challenge	Geneva, Switzerland	
1500 m freestyle	15:26.20		Julio Bernardon	Switzerland	4 July 2024	European Junior Championships	Vilnius, Lithuania	
5000 m freestyle	53:54.54		Nils Liess	Lancy-Natation	17 May 2014	-	Bellinzona, Switzerland	
50 m backstroke	24.75	h	Flori Lang	Switzerland	1 August 2009	World Championships	Rome, Italy	
100 m backstroke	53.32	sf	Roman Mityukov	Switzerland	24 July 2023	World Championships	Fukuoka, Japan	
100 m backstroke	53.32	r, =	Roman Mityukov	Geneve Natation 1885	9 April 2026	Swiss Championships	Uster, Switzerland	
200 m backstroke	1:54.07		Roman Mityukov	Switzerland	12 August 2026	European Championships	Paris, France	
50m breaststroke	27.62	h	Maël Allegrini	Switzerland	21 July 2025	World University Games	Berlin, Germany	
100m breaststroke	1:00.29	h	Jérémy Desplanches	Switzerland	24 July 2021	Olympic Games	Tokyo, Japan	
200m breaststroke	2:10.37		Yannick Käser	Switzerland	23 August 2017	Universiade	Taipei, Taiwan	
50m butterfly	22.51		Noè Ponti	Switzerland	28 July 2025	World Championships	Singapore, Singapore	
100m butterfly	49.83		Noè Ponti	Switzerland	2 August 2025	World Championships	Singapore, Singapore	
200m butterfly	1:54.14	sf, =	Noè Ponti	Switzerland	30 July 2024	Olympic Games	Paris, France	
200m butterfly	1:54.14	=	Noè Ponti	Switzerland	31 July 2024	Olympic Games	Paris, France	
200m individual medley	1:56.17		Jérémy Desplanches	Switzerland	30 July 2021	Olympic Games	Tokyo, Japan	
400m individual medley	4:12.86		Jérémy Desplanches	Olympic Nice Natation	16 April 2019	French Championships	Rennes, France	
4 × 100 m freestyle relay	3:13.41		Roman Mityukov (48.20); Nils Liess (48.53); Noè Ponti (48.57); Antonio Djakovic (48.11)	Switzerland	17 May 2021	European Championships	Budapest, Hungary	
4 × 200 m freestyle relay	7:06.12		Antonio Djakovic (1:45.77); Nils Liess (1:47.74); Noè Ponti (1:46.93); Roman Mityukov (1:45.68)	Switzerland	28 July 2021	Olympic Games	Tokyo, Japan	
4 × 100 m medley relay	3:32.49		Roman Mityukov (53.81); Gian-Luca Gartmann (1:01.13); Noè Ponti (49.40); Balint Ashton (48.15)	Switzerland	16 August 2026	European Championships	Paris, France	

Legend: # – Record awaiting ratification by Schweizerischer Schwimmverband; WR – World record; ER – European record; e – equalled existing record;
Records not set in finals: h – heat; sf – semifinal; r – relay 1st leg; rh – relay heat 1st leg; b – B final; † – en route to final mark; so – swim-off; tt – time trial

=== Women ===
Event	Time		Name	Club	Date	Meet	Location	Ref
50 m freestyle	25.07		Nina Kost	SC Uster Wallisellen	24 March 2019	Swiss Championships	Uster, Switzerland	
100 m freestyle	54.53	r	Nina Kost	SC Uster Wallisellen	22 March 2019	Swiss Championships	Uster, Switzerland	
200 m freestyle	1:58.77	h	Maria Ugolkova	Switzerland	23 June 2017	Trofeo Sette Colli	Rome, Italy	
400 m freestyle	4:09.29		Flavia Rigamonti	Dallas Mustangs	6 June 2008	Texas Senior Circuit Championships	Austin, United States	
800 m freestyle	8:25.59		Flavia Rigamonti	Switzerland	9 August 2007	Universiade	Bangkok, Thailand	
1500 m freestyle	15:55.38		Flavia Rigamonti	Switzerland	27 March 2007	World Championships	Melbourne, Australia	
5000m freestyle	56:45.70		Swann Oberson	FSN	21 May 2011	-	Bellinzona, Switzerland	
50m backstroke	28.09		Nina Kost	SV Nikar Heidelberg	13 March 2021	SV Nikar Heidelberg Invitation Meet	Heidelberg, Germany	
100m backstroke	1:00.35	sf	Nina Kost	Switzerland	20 May 2021	European Championships	Budapest, Hungary	
200m backstroke	2:11.84		Nina Kost	SV Nikar Heidelberg	5 June 2021	German Championships	Berlin, Germany	
50m breaststroke	31.17		Lisa Mamie	Switzerland	26 June 2021	Sette Colli Trophy	Rome, Italy	
100m breaststroke	1:06.60		Lisa Mamie	Switzerland	11 August 2020	Sette Colli Trophy	Rome, Italy	
200m breaststroke	2:22.05		Lisa Mamie	Switzerland	21 May 2021	European Championships	Budapest, Hungary	
50m butterfly	26.19		Sasha Touretski	Gyõri Úszó Sportegy	21 December 2018	Győr Open	Győr, Hungary	
100m butterfly	58.22	h	Maria Ugolkova	Switzerland	24 July 2021	Olympic Games	Tokyo, Japan	
200m butterfly	2:07.90	sf	Martina van Berkel	Switzerland	9 August 2016	Olympic Games	Rio de Janeiro, Brazil	
200m individual medley	2:10.04	h	Maria Ugolkova	Switzerland	26 July 2021	Olympic Games	Tokyo, Japan	
400m individual medley	4:45.12	h	Martina van Berkel	Switzerland	6 August 2016	Olympic Games	Rio de Janeiro, Brazil	
4 × 100 m freestyle relay	3:38.85		Maria Ugolkova (54.86); Sasha Touretski (54.64); Nina Kost (54.42); Noémi Girardet (54.93)	Switzerland	3 August 2018	European Championships	Glasgow, Great Britain	
4 × 200 m freestyle relay	8:08.59	h	Danielle Villars (2:02.69); Noémi Girardet (2:00.77); Martina van Berkel (2:03.26); Maria Ugolkova (2:01.87)	Switzerland	6 August 2015	World Championships	Kazan, Russia	
4 × 100 m medley relay	4:01.85	h	Nina Kost (1:02.49); Lisa Mamie (1:06.80); Sasha Touretski (58.68); Maria Ugolkova (53.88)	Switzerland	28 July 2019	World Championships	Gwangju, South Korea	

Legend: # – Record awaiting ratification by Schweizerischer Schwimmverband; WR – World record; ER – European record; e – equalled existing record;
Records not set in finals: h – heat; sf – semifinal; r – relay 1st leg; rh – relay heat 1st leg; b – B final; † – en route to final mark; so – swim-off; tt – time trial

=== Mixed relay ===
Event	Time		Name	Club	Date	Meet	Location	Ref
4 × 100 m freestyle relay	3:29.14	h	Roman Mityukov (50.00); Antonio Djakovic (49.12); Maria Ugolkova (54.14); Noémi Girardet (55.88)	Switzerland	27 July 2019	World Championships	Gwangju, South Korea	
4×200 m freestyle relay	7:51.25	h, #	Tiago Behar (1:50.81); Marius Toscan (1:51.06); Gaia Rasmussen (2:02.89); Manon Richard (2:06.49)	Switzerland	15 August 2026	European Championships	Paris, France	
4 × 100 m medley relay	3:46.16		Roman Mityukov (53.92); Lisa Mamie (1:07.21); Noè Ponti (50.98); Maria Ugolkova (54.05)	Switzerland	20 May 2021	European Championships	Budapest, Hungary	

Legend: # – Record awaiting ratification by Schweizerischer Schwimmverband; WR – World record; ER – European record; e – equalled existing record;
Records not set in finals: h – heat; so – swim-off

== Short Course (25 m) ==
=== Men ===
Event	Time		Name	Club	Date	Meet	Location	Ref
50m freestyle	21.18	r	Noè Ponti	SC Uster	16 November 2024	Swiss Championships	Sursee, Switzerland	
100m freestyle	46.49		Noè Ponti	SC Uster	13 April 2025	Swiss Club Championships	Uster, Switzerland	
200m freestyle	1:42.47		Antonio Djakovic	Switzerland	17 December 2021	World Championships	Abu Dhabi, United Arab Emirates	
400m freestyle	3:36.83		Antonio Djakovic	Switzerland	16 December 2021	World Championships	Abu Dhabi, United Arab Emirates	
800m freestyle	7:40.76		Antonio Djakovic	SC Uster	24 October 2026	Regional Indoor Championships	Uster, Switzerland	
1500m freestyle	14:50.69		Paul Niederberger	Lausanne Aquatique	14 November 2026	Swiss Championships	Prilly, Switzerland	
50m backstroke	22.73	sf	Thierry Bollin	Switzerland	12 December 2024	World Championships	Budapest, Hungary	
100m backstroke	49.84	rh	Thierry Bollin	Switzerland	15 December 2024	World Championships	Budapest, Hungary	
200m backstroke	1:49.93		Roman Mityukov	Genève Natation 1885	15 November 2026	Swiss Championships	Prilly, Switzerland	
50m breaststroke	26.41		Antoine Viquerat	Geneve Natation 1885	14 November 2026	Swiss Championships	Prilly, Switzerland	
100m breaststroke	57.19		Antoine Viquerat	Geneve Natation 1885	15 November 2026	Swiss Championships	Prilly, Switzerland	
200m breaststroke	2:03.83		Antoine Viquerat	Geneve Natation 1885	13 November 2026	Swiss Championships	Prilly, Switzerland	
50m butterfly	21.32	WR	Noè Ponti	Switzerland	11 December 2024	World Championships	Budapest, Hungary	
100m butterfly	47.71	ER	Noè Ponti	Switzerland	14 December 2024	World Championships	Budapest, Hungary	
200m butterfly	1:48.56	ER	Noè Ponti	SC Uster	14 November 2026	Swiss Championships	Prilly, Switzerland	
100m individual medley	50.33		Noè Ponti	Switzerland	13 December 2024	World Championships	Budapest, Hungary	
200m individual medley	1:51.78		Noè Ponti	Switzerland	19 October 2024	World Cup	Shanghai, China	
400m individual medley	4:03.71		Jérémy Desplanches	Olympic Nice Natation	14 December 2019	French Championships	Angers, France	
4 × 50 m freestyle relay	1:26.34		Flori Lang (21.75); Dominik Meichtry (21.68); Aurelien Kuenzi (21.38); Daniel Rast (21.53)	Switzerland	14 December 2008	European Championships	Rijeka, Croatia	
4 × 100 m freestyle relay	3:11.53		Roman Mityukov (47.67); Antonio Djakovic (47.21); Thomas Hallock (48.25); Robin Yeboah (48.40)	Switzerland	16 December 2021	World Championships	Abu Dhabi, United Arab Emirates	
4 × 200 m freestyle relay	7:21.23		Karel Novy; Philippe Meyer; Philipp Gilgen; Christoph Bühler	Switzerland	1 April 1999	World Championships	Hong Kong	
4 × 50 m medley relay	1:31.98		Thierry Bollin (23.03); Maël Allegrini (26.36); Noè Ponti (21.35); Tiago Behar (21.24)	Switzerland	7 December 2025	European Championships	Lublin, Poland	
4 × 100 m medley relay	3:24.74	h	Thierry Bollin (49.84); Louis Droupy (59.06); Noe Ponti (48.28); Roman Mityukov (47.55)	Switzerland	15 December 2024	World Championships	Budapest, Hungary	

Legend: # – Record awaiting ratification by Schweizerischer Schwimmverband; WR – World record; ER – European record; e – equalled existing record;
Records not set in finals: h – heat; sf – semifinal; r – relay 1st leg; rh – relay heat 1st leg; b – B final; † – en route to final mark; so – swim-off; tt – time trial

=== Women ===
Event	Time		Name	Club	Date	Meet	Location	Ref
50 m freestyle	24.32		Nina Kost	DSW 1912 Darmstadt	15 December 2018	German Championships	Berlin, Germany	
100 m freestyle	52.87		Nina Kost	DSW 1912 Darmstadt	13 December 2018	German Championships	Berlin, Germany	
200 m freestyle	1:56.35		Maria Ugolkova	SC Uster Wallisellen	16 November 2019	Swiss Championships	Neuchâtel, Switzerland	
400 m freestyle	4:03.73	h	Flavia Rigamonti	Switzerland	15 December 2007	European Championships	Debrecen, Hungary	
800 m freestyle	8:12.91		Flavia Rigamonti	Switzerland	14 December 2007	European Championships	Debrecen, Hungary	
1500 m freestyle	16:15.73	h	Vanna Djakovic	Switzerland	6 December 2025	European Championships	Lublin, Poland	
50m backstroke	26.97	r	Angelina Patt	SC Uster	16 November 2025	Swiss Championships	Uster, Switzerland	
100m backstroke	58.42		Nina Kost	DSW 1912 Darmstadt	15 December 2018	German Championships	Berlin, Germany	
200m backstroke	2:07.11		Gaia Rasmussen	Genève Natation 1885	18 April 2026	Swiss Club Championships	Oberkirch, Switzerland	
50m breaststroke	30.24	sf	Lisa Mamie	Switzerland	4 December 2019	European Championships	Glasgow, Great Britain	
100m breaststroke	1:05.34		Lisa Mamie	Switzerland	7 December 2019	European Championships	Glasgow, Great Britain	
200m breaststroke	2:20.45	h	Lisa Mamie	Switzerland	16 December 2022	World Championships	Melbourne, Australia	
50m butterfly	26.15	h	Sasha Touretski	Switzerland	29 September 2018	World Cup	Eindhoven, Netherlands	
100m butterfly	56.81		Maria Ugolkova	Switzerland	9 October 2021	World Cup	Budapest, Hungary	
200m butterfly	2:06.26	h	Maria Ugolkova	Switzerland	17 December 2021	World Championships	Abu Dhabi, United Arab Emirates	
100m individual medley	58.25	sf	Maria Ugolkova	Switzerland	18 December 2021	World Championships	Abu Dhabi, United Arab Emirates	
200m individual medley	2:06.41		Maria Ugolkova	Switzerland	6 November 2021	European Championships	Kazan, Russia	
400m individual medley	4:33.51		Maria Ugolkova	Switzerland	8 October 2021	World Cup	Budapest, Hungary	
4 × 50 m freestyle relay	1:41.21		Sasha Touretski (24.99); Nina Kost (24.27); Alexandra Froissart (26.27); Malika Gobet (25.68)	Genève Natation 1885	20 November 2021	Swiss Championships	Sursee, Switzerland	
4 × 100 m freestyle relay	3:43.14		Arianna Sakellaris (57.38); Nina Kost (53.31); Svenja Stoffel (56.24); Seraina Sturzenegger (56.21)	SC Uster Wallisellen	4 November 2018	North Sea Meet	Kristiansand, Norway	
4 × 200 m freestyle relay	8:00.81		Nicole Zahnd (1:59.57); Dominique Diezi (2:01.12); Flavia Rigamonti (2:00.07); Chantal Strasser (2:00.05)	Switzerland	3 April 2002	World Championships	Moscow, Russia	
4 × 50 m medley relay	1:49.11	h	Nina Kost (27.89); Lisa Mamie (30.74); Sasha Touretski (26.19); Maria Ugolkova (24.29)	Switzerland	17 December 2021	World Championships	Abu Dhabi, United Arab Emirates	
4 × 100 m medley relay	3:55.84		Nina Kost (58.98); Lisa Mamie (1:05.79); Maria Ugolkova (56.35); Sasha Touretski (54.72)	Switzerland	21 December 2021	World Championships	Abu Dhabi, United Arab Emirates	

Legend: # – Record awaiting ratification by Schweizerischer Schwimmverband; WR – World record; ER – European record; e – equalled existing record;
Records not set in finals: h – heat; sf – semifinal; r – relay 1st leg; rh – relay heat 1st leg; b – B final; † – en route to final mark; so – swim-off; tt – time trial

=== Mixed relay ===
Event	Time		Name	Club	Date	Meet	Location	Ref
4 × 50 m freestyle relay	1:31.96		Roman Mityukov (22.13); Thomas Hallock (21.37); Maria Ugolkova (24.13); Sasha Touretski (24.33)	Switzerland	17 December 2021	World Championships	Abu Dhabi, United Arab Emirates	
4 × 50 m medley relay	1:41.68	h	Thierry Bollin (23.17); Maël Allegrini (26.59); Gaia Rasmussen (26.67); Angelina Patt (25.25)	Switzerland	3 December 2025	European Championships	Lublin, Poland	

Legend: # – Record awaiting ratification by Schweizerischer Schwimmverband; e – equalled existing record;
Records not set in finals: h – heat; so – swim-off
