= Judo at the 1998 Asian Games – Men's 60 kg =

Judo competition

Men's 60 kg at the 1998 Asian Games
- Venue: Thammasat Gymnasium 1
- Date: 7 December 1998
- Competitors: 18 from 18 nations

Medalists
gold medal	Kazuhiko Tokuno	Japan
silver medal	Yang Bo	China
bronze medal	Nurbol Suleimenov	Kazakhstan
bronze medal	Hyun Seung-hoon	South Korea

The men's 60 kilograms (Extra lightweight) competition at the 1998 Asian Games in Bangkok was held on 7 December 1998 at the Thammasat Gymnasium 1.

== Schedule ==
All times are Indochina Time (UTC+07:00)

Date	Time	Event
Monday, 7 December 1998	14:00	Round 1
Monday, 7 December 1998	14:00	Round 2
Monday, 7 December 1998	14:00	Quarterfinals
Monday, 7 December 1998	14:00	Repechage
Monday, 7 December 1998	14:00	Semifinals
Monday, 7 December 1998	14:00	Finals

== Results ==
Legend

- DEC — Won by decision
- IPP — Won by ippon
- KOK — Won by koka
- WAZ — Won by waza-ari
- WO — Won by walkover
- YUK — Won by yuko

=== Main bracket ===
==== Final ====
Final
Kazuhiko Tokuno (JPN)	IPP
Yang Bo (CHN)

==== Top half ====
Round 1
Kang Myong-chang (PRK)	IPP
Nguyễn Quốc Trung (VIE)

Round 2
Arthit Latpakdi (LAO)
Kang Myong-chang (PRK)	IPP
Kazuhiko Tokuno (JPN)	IPP
Abraham Pulia (PHI)
Arvind Kumar (IND)
Dorjpalamyn Narmandakh (MGL)	YUK
Wu Lung-ju (TPE)
Hyun Seung-hoon (KOR)	WAZ

Quarterfinals
Kang Myong-chang (PRK)
Kazuhiko Tokuno (JPN)	IPP
Dorjpalamyn Narmandakh (MGL)
Hyun Seung-hoon (KOR)	IPP

Semifinals
Kazuhiko Tokuno (JPN)	IPP
Hyun Seung-hoon (KOR)

==== Bottom half ====
Round 1
Nurbol Suleimenov (KAZ)	WAZ
Masoud Haji Akhondzadeh (IRI)

Round 2
Nurbol Suleimenov (KAZ)	IPP
Alisher Mukhtarov (UZB)
Ali Ibrahim (SYR)
Thiti Larpanant (THA)	DEC
Yang Bo (CHN)	YUK
Wat Tze Wan (HKG)
Rustam Boqiev (TJK)
Khaled Al-Dhafeeri (KUW)	WO

Quarterfinals
Nurbol Suleimenov (KAZ)	IPP
Thiti Larpanant (THA)
Yang Bo (CHN)	WAZ
Khaled Al-Dhafeeri (KUW)

Semifinals
Nurbol Suleimenov (KAZ)
Yang Bo (CHN)	DEC

=== Repechage ===
Repechage 1
Masoud Haji Akhondzadeh (IRI)
Alisher Mukhtarov (UZB)	IPP

Repechage 2
Abraham Pulia (PHI)
Kang Myong-chang (PRK)	IPP
Wu Lung-ju (TPE)
Dorjpalamyn Narmandakh (MGL)	WAZ
Alisher Mukhtarov (UZB)	IPP
Thiti Larpanant (THA)
Wat Tze Wan (HKG)
Khaled Al-Dhafeeri (KUW)	WAZ

Repechage 3
Kang Myong-chang (PRK)	WAZ
Dorjpalamyn Narmandakh (MGL)
Alisher Mukhtarov (UZB)	IPP
Khaled Al-Dhafeeri (KUW)

Bronze medals
Kang Myong-chang (PRK)
Nurbol Suleimenov (KAZ)	KOK
Alisher Mukhtarov (UZB)
Hyun Seung-hoon (KOR)	WAZ
