= Melvin Méndez =

Puerto Rican Olympic judoka (born 1974)

Personal information
- Full name: Melvin Méndez Acevedo
- Nationality: Puerto Rico
- Born: 17 November 1974 (age 51) Aguada, Puerto Rico
- Height: 1.67 m (5 ft 5 1/2 in)
- Weight: 66 kg (146 lb)

Sport
- Sport: Judo
- Event: 66 kg
Medal record
Men's judo
Representing Puerto Rico
Central American and Caribbean Games
Bronze medal – third place	2010 Mayagüez	66 kg

Melvin Méndez Acevedo (born November 17, 1974, in Aguada) is a Puerto Rican judoka who competed in the men's half-lightweight category. He picked up a bronze medal in the 66-kg division at the 2010 Central American and Caribbean Games in Mayagüez, attained a fifth-place finish at the 2003 Pan American Games in Santo Domingo, Dominican Republic, and represented his nation Puerto Rico in three editions of the Olympic Games (1996, 2000, and 2004).

Mendez made his official debut at the 1996 Summer Olympics in Atlanta, where he competed in the men's 60-kg class. He was defeated by an ippon and a kata guruma (shoulder wheel) from Mongolian judoka and eventual bronze medalist Dorjpalamyn Narmandakh in his opening match. Mendez gave himself a chance for an Olympic bronze medal through the repechage, but crashed out immediately in another ippon defeat to Great Britain's Nigel Donohue with only 20 seconds remaining.

At the 2000 Summer Olympics in Sydney, Mendez suffered a one-arm shoulder throw (ippon seoi nage) defeat at the hands of Italy's Girolamo Giovinazzo in the men's 66-kg opening match. In the repechage, Mendez redeemed for his another chance in the Olympic podium, but failed to edge past the first playoff of the draft with a 1–0 deficit on yuko score against Brazil's Henrique Guimarães.

Eight years after his official Olympic debut, Mendez qualified for his third Puerto Rican squad, as a 30-year-old, in the men's half-lightweight class (66 kg) at the 2004 Summer Olympics in Athens. Earlier in the process, he finished third and received a berth on the Puerto Rican Olympic team from the Pan American Championships in Margarita Island, Venezuela. Unlike his two previous Olympic stints, Mendez got off to a difficult start with an unprecedented deadlock and a golden score in his opening match against Spain's Óscar Peñas, forcing them to fight in the second round. After nine seconds, Mendez came his third chance of an Olympic medal to a dramatic halt by a single leg takedown (kuchiki taoshi) from Penas.
