= Pakin (disambiguation) =

Pakin is an Armenian literary and cultural periodical published in Beirut, Lebanon since 1962.

Pakin may also refer to:

- Pakin Atoll, small atoll lying off the northwest coast of Pohnpei in the Federated States of Micronesia
- Andrei Pakin (born 1978), Kyrgystani swimmer
