= Giorgi Kurdgelashvili =

Moldovan judoka (born 1975)

Giorgi Kurdgelashvili (born 7 January 1975) is a Moldovan judoka.

He competed in the Judo at the 2000 Summer Olympics – Men's 60 kg event at the 2000 Summer Olympics, but was eliminated in the quarterfinals by Manolo Poulot and in the repechage by Aidyn Smagulov, both eventual bronze medalists. The same year Kurdgelashvili won one World Cup event, the Dutch Grand Prix.
