= Korshikov =

Korshikov (masculine, Russian: Коршиков) or Korshikova (feminine, Russian: Коршикова) is a Russian surname. Notable people with the surname include:

- Gennadi Korshikov (born 1949), Russian rower
- Anna Korshikova (born 1982), Kyrgyz swimmer
