= Naveira =

Naveira is a surname. Notable people with the surname include:

- Gustavo Naveira (born 1960), Argentine tango dancer and dance teacher
- Miriam Naveira (1934–2018), Puerto Rican jurist
- Miriam Rodón Naveira, Puerto Rican environmental scientist
- Roberto Naveira (born 1970), Spanish judoka
