= Giovinazzo (surname) =

Giovinazzo is an Italian surname. Notable people with the surname include:

- Buddy Giovinazzo (born 1957), American film director
- Carmine Giovinazzo (born 1973), American actor
- Girolamo Giovinazzo (born 1968), Italian judoka
- Isabella Giovinazzo, Australian actress
