= Kazuhiko Tokuno =

Japanese judoka (born 1974)

Personal information
- Born: 1 May 1974 (age 52)
- Occupation: Judoka

Sport
- Country: Japan
- Sport: Judo
- Weight class: ‍–‍60 kg

Achievements and titles
- World Champ.: (silver) (1999)
- Asian Champ.: (gold) (1995, 1998)
Medal record
Men's judo
Representing Japan
World Championships
Silver medal – second place	1999 Birmingham	‍–‍60 kg
Bronze medal – third place	2001 Munich	‍–‍60 kg
Asian Games
Gold medal – first place	1998 Bangkok	‍–‍60 kg
Asian Championships
Gold medal – first place	1995 New Delhi	‍–‍60 kg
East Asian Games
Gold medal – first place	1997 Busan	‍–‍60 kg

Profile at external databases
- IJF: 210
- JudoInside.com: 1056
- Updated on 8 April 2024

Kazuhiko Tokuno (徳野 和彦, Tokuno Kazuhiko; born 1 May 1974) is a Japanese judoka. He is the current trainer of the Turkmenistan National Judo team.

Tokuno was born in Iyo, Ehime, and began judo at the age of 6. He entered the Kanagawa Prefectural Police after graduating from Tokai University.

Tokuno was good at Seoinage and got medals of world championships twice. He was also known as a rival of three-time Olympic champion Tadahiro Nomura for long time.

As of 2010, Tokuno coaches judo at Komatsu Limited and among his students are Mika Sugimoto, Ayumi Tanimoto, and Mina Watanabe.

Since 2023 Tokuno has been coaching the Turkmenistan judo team.
