= Alexandre García (judoka) =

Brazilian judoka

Personal information
- Born: 16 February 1972 (age 53); Porto Alegre, Brazil

Sport
- Sport: Judo

Alexandre García (born 16 February 1972) is a Brazilian judoka. He competed in the men's extra-lightweight event at the 1996 Summer Olympics.
