= Alexander Tkachev (swimmer) =

Russian-born Kyrgyzstani former swimmer (born 1972)

Personal information
- Full name: Aleksandr Tkachev
- National team: Kyrgyzstan; Russia
- Born: 11 November 1972 (age 53)
- Height: 1.90 m (6 ft 3 in)
- Weight: 80 kg (176 lb)

Sport
- Sport: Swimming
- Strokes: Breaststroke
Medal record
Men's swimming
Representing Russia
World Championships (SC)
Bronze medal – third place	1995 Rio de Janeiro	4×100 m medley
Universiade
Gold medal – first place	1995 Fukuoka	200 m breaststroke
Silver medal – second place	1995 Fukuoka	100 m breaststroke
Silver medal – second place	1997 Messina	100 m breaststroke

Aleksandr Tkachev (Russian: Александр Ткачев; born 11 November 1972) is a Russian-born Kyrgyzstani former swimmer, who specialized in breaststroke events. He collected a total of three medals, one gold and two silver, at the Universiade (1995 and 1997), and later represented his adopted nation Kyrgyzstan at the 2000 Summer Olympics.

Tkachev established his swimming history, as a member of the Russian squad, at the 1995 Summer Universiade in Fukuoka, Japan, where he captured two swimming medals: a gold in the 200 m breaststroke (2:14.69), and silver in the 100 m breaststroke (1:03.38, narrowly lost to host nation's Akira Hayashi by more than half a second). On that same year, he helped the Russians capture a bronze medal in the 4 × 100 m medley relay at the FINA Short Course World Championships in Rio de Janeiro, Brazil.

Two years later, at the 1997 Summer Universiade in Messina, Italy, Tkachev earned his second career silver in the sprint breaststroke (1:02.77), handing an entire medal haul for Russia with a one–two finish, alongside Stanislav Lopukhov.

At the 2000 Summer Olympics in Sydney, Tkachev transferred his Russian citizenship status to compete for the Kyrgyzstan squad, swimming only in two events. He achieved a FINA B-standard entry time of 2:21.90 from the Russian National Championships in Moscow. In the 200 m breaststroke, Tkachev failed to reach the top 8 final, as he finished his semifinal run with a time of 2:16.90. Earlier in the prelims, he made a surprise packet with a fifteenth-place time of 2:15.63, a Kyrgyzstan record, from a small field of five swimmers in heat two. Three days later, Tkachev teamed up with fellow Russian imports Aleksandr Shilin, Konstantin Ushkov, and Sergey Ashihmin in the 4 × 100 m medley relay. Swimming the breaststroke leg in heat one, Tkachev recorded a split of 1:03.69, a slowest in the field, but a diverse Kyrgyzstan team settled for seventh place and nineteenth overall in a final time of 3:46.70.
