= Brandan Greczkowski =

American judoka (born 1977)

Personal information
- Born: 18 July 1977 (age 49)
- Occupation: Judoka

Sport
- Sport: Judo

Profile at external databases
- JudoInside.com: 9452

Brandan Alan Greczkowski (born July 18, 1977, in Norwich, Connecticut) is an American former judoka who was a three time U.S. champion and finished 7th at the 2000 Summer Olympics.

In addition to his three U.S. championships, he finished second once and third twice. He also won two bronze medals at the Pan-American championships. At the 2000 Summer Olympics He won three matches and lost two. His losses were to three time Olympic champion Tadahiro Nomura and bronze medalist Aidyn Smagulov.
