= Adrian Robertson =

Australian judoka

Personal information
- Nationality: Australian
- Born: 9 September 1974 (age 51) Rockhampton, Queensland, Australia
- Occupation: Judoka

Sport
- Sport: Judo

Profile at external databases
- JudoInside.com: 7898

Adrian Robertson (born 9 September 1974) is an Australian judoka. He competed in the men's extra-lightweight event at the 2000 Summer Olympics.
