= Aleksandr Shilin =

Russian-Kyrgyzstani swimmer

Personal information
- Full name: Aleksandr Shilin
- National team: Kyrgyzstan; Russia
- Born: 2 February 1976 (age 50) Leningrad, Russian SFSR, Soviet Union
- Height: 1.82 m (6 ft 0 in)
- Weight: 73 kg (161 lb)

Sport
- Sport: Swimming
- Strokes: Freestyle, backstroke

Aleksandr Shilin (Russian: Александр Шилин; born February 2, 1976) is a Russian-born Kyrgyzstani former swimmer, who specialized in middle-distance freestyle and sprint backstroke events. He represented his adopted nation Kyrgyzstan at the 2000 Summer Olympics, and posted top-ten times in 50 m backstroke from the European and Russian Swimming Masters.

Shilin competed in two relay swimming events at the 2000 Summer Olympics in Sydney. On the fourth day of the Games, Shilin, along with Andrei Pakin, Ivan Ivanov, and Dmitri Kuzmin, were disqualified from heat one for an early takeoff during the lead-off leg. Three days later, in the 4×100 m medley relay, Shilin teamed up with Russian imports Alexander Tkachev, Konstantin Ushkov, and Sergey Ashihmin. Leading off the backstroke leg in the same heat, he recorded a split of 57.88, but a diverse Kyrgyzstan team settled for seventh place and nineteenth overall in a final time of 3:46.70.
