= Liao Chun-chiang =

Taiwanese judoka

Personal information
- Nationality: Taiwanese
- Born: 12 January 1973 (age 52)

Sport
- Sport: Judo

Liao Chun-chiang (born 12 January 1973) is a Taiwanese judoka. He competed in the men's extra-lightweight event at the 1996 Summer Olympics.
