= Sean Sullivan (judoka) =

Irish judoka (born 1970)

Personal information
- Nationality: Irish
- Born: 28 December 1970 (age 55)

Sport
- Sport: Judo

Sean Sullivan (born 28 December 1970) is an Irish judoka. He competed in the men's extra-lightweight event at the 1996 Summer Olympics.
