= Nikolay Ozhegin =

Russian judoka (born 1971)

Medal record

Men's judo

Representing Russia

Goodwill Games
Bronze medal – third place	1994 Saint Petersburg	60 kg

World Championships
Gold medal – first place	1995 Chiba	60 kg

Nikolay Ozhegin (born 4 May 1971) is a Russian judoka who was a 1995 World Champion, 1990 Junior World Champion, and multiple-time Russian Champion (1994 and 1999). He also competed at the 1996 Summer Olympics in the men's extra-lightweight (60 kg) event but did not win a medal after being defeated in the second round by the famous Japanese champion Tadahiro Nomura.

== Achievements ==
Year	Tournament	Place	Weight class
1998	European Judo Championships	5th	Extra lightweight (60 kg)
1997	World Judo Championships	7th	Extra lightweight (60 kg)
1996	Olympic Games	5th	Extra lightweight (60 kg)
1996	European Judo Championships	5th	Extra lightweight (60 kg)
1995	World Judo Championships	1st	Extra lightweight (60 kg)
1994	Goodwill Games	3rd	Extra lightweight (60 kg)
1990	Junior World Judo Championships	1st	Extra lightweight (60 kg)
