= Oberkirch =

Oberkirch may refer to:

- Oberkirch (Baden), a town in Baden-Württemberg, Germany
- Oberkirch, Switzerland, a municipality in the canton of Lucerne, Switzerland
- Henriette Louise de Waldner de Freundstein, Baronne d'Oberkirch

== See also ==
- Oberkirche, Arnstadt, a church in Germany
- Oberkirche, Bad Frankenhausen, a church in Germany
- Oberkirchen (disambiguation)
