= Brian Power =

Australian judoka

Personal information
- Nationality: Australian
- Born: 11 April 1974 (age 52) Canberra, Australia

Sport
- Sport: Judo

Brian Power (born 11 April 1974) is an Australian judoka. He competed in the men's extra-lightweight event at the 1996 Summer Olympics.
