= Dora Maldonado =

Honduran judoka (born 1970)

Personal information
- Full name: Dora M. Maldonado
- Nationality: Honduran
- Born: 9 November 1970 (age 55)

Sport
- Sport: Judo
Medal record
Representing Honduras
Pan American Games
Bronze medal – third place	1995 Mar del Plata	Extra-lightweight
Central American and Caribbean Games
Bronze medal – third place	1998 Maracaibo	Extra-lightweight
Central American Championships
Silver medal – second place	2006 San José	Lightweight

Dora M. Maldonado (born 9 November 1970) is a Honduran judoka. During her international career, she competed in the women's extra-lightweight event at the 1996 Summer Olympics. She also won multiple medals in international competition such as bronzes at the 1995 Pan American Games and 1998 Central American and Caribbean Games.

== Biography ==
Dora M. Maldonado was born on 9 November 1970 in Honduras. As an athlete, he represented Honduras in international competition. Maldonado competed in the sport of judo. She was coached by Ernesto Taillacq, who had also coached multiple Honduran judokas who have competed at the Olympics such as Leonardo Carcamo and Kenny Godoy. Maldonado competed at the 1995 Pan American Games held in Mar del Plata, Argentina, in the women's extra-lightweight division. There, she won the bronze medal.

Maldonado was selected to compete for Honduras at the 1996 Summer Olympics held in Atlanta, United States. At the 1996 Summer Games, she competed in one event, the women's extra-lightweight event for judokas that weighed 48 kilograms (106 lb) or less. She was one of the first women to represent Honduras in judo at the Olympic Games alongside Jeny Rodriguez. Maldonado received a bye for the first round and went up against Ryoko Tamura of Japan during the quarterfinals in Pool A. There, Maldonado was defeated by ippon and was relegated to the repechage round. There, she competed against Tatiana Moskvina of Belarus and lost by hansoku-make. Overall, Maldonado placed equal thirteenth alongside one other competitor out of the 23 judokas that competed in the event.

After the 1996 Summer Games, she competed at the 1998 Central American and Caribbean Games held in Maracaibo, Venezuela, in the women's extra-lightweight. There, she won a bronze medal. She also competed at the 2006 Central American Judo Championships held in San José, Costa Rica. There, she won the silver medal after losing to Reina Cordoba of Costa Rica in the finals.
