= Dmitri Kuzmin =

Russian-born Kyrgyzstani former swimmer (born 1977)

Personal information
- Full name: Dmitri Kuzmin
- National team: Kyrgyzstan; Russia
- Born: 9 September 1977 (age 49)
- Height: 1.90 m (6 ft 3 in)
- Weight: 78 kg (172 lb)

Sport
- Sport: Swimming
- Strokes: Freestyle
Medal record
Men's swimming
Representing Russia
European Championships
Bronze medal – third place	1999 Istanbul	4×200 m freestyle

Dmitri Kuzmin (Russian: Дмитрий Кузьмин; born September 9, 1977) is a Russian-born Kyrgyzstani former swimmer, who specialized in middle-distance freestyle events. He is a single-time Olympian (2000), and a former Kyrgyzstan record holder in the 200 and 400 m freestyle. While playing for the Russian senior team, Kuzmin also earned a bronze medal, along with Maksim Korsunov, Dmitry Chernyshov, and Andrey Kapralov, in the 4 × 200 m freestyle relay at the 1999 European Aquatics Championships in Istanbul, Turkey.

Kuzmin competed in three swimming events at the 2000 Summer Olympics in Sydney. He cleared a FINA B-standard of 1:51.90 from the Russian National Championships in Moscow. On the first day of the Games, Kuzmin teamed up with Sergey Ashihmin, Konstantin Ushkov, and another Russian import Alexei Pavlov in the 4 × 100 m freestyle relay. Kuzmin swam the third leg in heat two and recorded a split of 50.61, but the Kyrgyz rounded out an eight-team field to last place and twentieth overall with a final time of 3:25.03. In the 200 m freestyle, Kuzmin placed twenty-eighth on the morning prelims. Swimming in heat four, Kuzmin edged out Moldova's Andrei Cecan to take a fifth spot by three-tenths of a second (0.30) in 1:52.93. Two days later, in the 4 × 200 m freestyle relay, Kuzmin, along with Andrei Pakin, Aleksandr Shilin, and Ivan Ivanov, were disqualified from heat one for an early takeoff during the lead-off leg.
