= Kim Jong-won =

South Korean judoka

Personal information
- Nationality: South Korean
- Born: 20 November 1975 (age 49)

Sport
- Sport: Judo

Kim Jong-won (born 20 November 1975) is a South Korean judoka. He competed in the men's extra-lightweight event at the 1996 Summer Olympics.
