= Juan Barahona (judoka) =

Ecuadorian judoka (born 1978)

Personal information
- Nationality: Ecuadorian
- Born: 15 February 1978 (age 47)

Sport
- Sport: Judo

Juan Barahona (born 15 February 1978) is an Ecuadorian judoka. He competed in the men's extra-lightweight event at the 2000 Summer Olympics.
