= Brendon Crooks =

New Zealand judoka

Personal information
- Nationality: New Zealand
- Born: 17 August 1971 (age 53); Auckland, New Zealand

Sport
- Sport: Judo

Brendon Crooks (born 17 August 1971) is a New Zealand judoka. He competed in the men's extra-lightweight event at the 2000 Summer Olympics.
