= Elchin Ismayilov =

Azerbaijani judoka (born 1982)

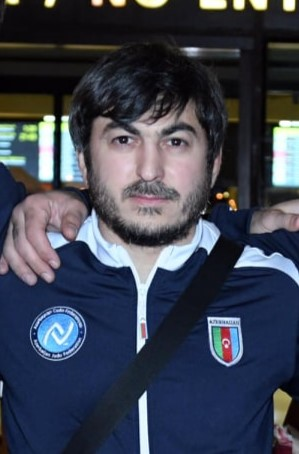

Personal information
- Born: 27 September 1982 (age 44)
- Occupation: Judoka

Sport
- Country: Azerbaijan
- Sport: Judo
- Weight class: –60 kg, –66 kg

Achievements and titles
- Olympic Games: 7th (2000)
- World Champ.: 5th (2001)
- European Champ.: (gold) (2000, 2001, 2005)
Medal record
Men's judo
Representing Azerbaijan
European Championships
Gold medal – first place	2000 Wroclaw	–60 kg
Gold medal – first place	2001 Paris	–60 kg
Gold medal – first place	2005 Rotterdam	–66 kg
Silver medal – second place	2002 Maribor	–60 kg
Silver medal – second place	2004 Bucharest	–66 kg
European Junior Championships
Gold medal – first place	1999 Rome	–60 kg
Gold medal – first place	2000 Nicosia	–60 kg
Silver medal – second place	1998 Bucharest	–60 kg

Profile at external databases
- IJF: 12683
- JudoInside.com: 12175
- Updated on 17 February 2022

Elchin Ismayilov (Azerbaijani: Elçin İsmayılov; born 27 September 1982, in Baku, Azerbaijan SSR, Soviet Union) is an Azerbaijani judoka.

== Achievements ==
Year	Tournament	Place	Weight class
2005	European Judo Championships	1st	Half lightweight (66 kg)
2004	European Judo Championships	2nd	Half lightweight (66 kg)
2003	World Judo Championships	7th	Extra lightweight (60 kg)
2002	European Judo Championships	2nd	Extra lightweight (60 kg)
2001	World Judo Championships	5th	Extra lightweight (60 kg)
2001	European Judo Championships	1st	Extra lightweight (60 kg)
2000	Olympic Games	7th	Extra lightweight (60 kg)
2000	European Judo Championships	1st	Extra lightweight (60 kg)
2000	European Judo Championships junior	1st	Extra lightweight (60 kg)
1999	European Judo Championships junior	1st	Extra lightweight (60 kg)
1998	European Judo Championships junior	1st	Extra lightweight (60 kg)
