= Marek Matuszek =

Slovak judoka (born 1972)

Personal information
- Born: 28 September 1972 (age 54)
- Occupation: Judoka

Sport
- Country: Slovakia
- Sport: Judo
- Weight class: ‍–‍60 kg, ‍–‍66 kg

Achievements and titles
- Olympic Games: 9th (2000)
- World Champ.: 9th (1999)
- European Champ.: 5th (1999)
Medal record
Men's judo
Representing Slovakia
Summer Universiade
Silver medal – second place	1995 Fukuoka	‍–‍60 kg

Profile at external databases
- IJF: 3331
- JudoInside.com: 3430
- Updated on 23 July 2025

Marek Matuszek (born 28 September 1972 in Bratislava) is a Slovak judoka.

== Achievements ==
Year	Tournament	Place	Weight class
1999	European Judo Championships	5th	Half lightweight (66 kg)
1996	European Judo Championships	7th	Extra lightweight (60 kg)
1995	Universiade	2nd	Extra lightweight (60 kg)
1994	European Judo Championships	7th	Extra lightweight (60 kg)
