= Yekaterina Tochenaya =

Kyrgyzstani swimmer

Personal information
- Full name: Yekaterina Tochenaya
- National team: Kyrgyzstan
- Born: 9 May 1981 (age 45) Volgograd, Russian SFSR, Soviet Union
- Height: 1.79 m (5 ft 10 in)
- Weight: 65 kg (143 lb)

Sport
- Sport: Swimming
- Strokes: Freestyle

Yekaterina Tochenaya (Russian: Екатерина Точеная; born May 9, 1981) is a Kyrgyzstani former swimmer, who specialized in sprint and middle-distance freestyle events. She holds a dual citizenship status to compete internationally for Kyrgyzstan and Russia, including her rare appearance at the 2000 Summer Olympics.

Tochenaya competed in three swimming events at the 2000 Summer Olympics in Sydney. She achieved FINA A-standards of 27.16 (50 m freestyle) and 58.83 (100 m freestyle) from the Russian Open Championships in Saint Petersburg. On the fifth day of the Games, Tochenaya swam two events in her program, with only 90 minutes in between. First, she placed forty-third in the 100 m freestyle. Swimming in heat two, she came from behind the pack with a spectacular swim to pick up a sixth seed in 58.80, sufficiently enough for her personal best. More than an hour later, Tochenaya, along Nataliya Korabelnikova, Anna Korshikova, and Anjelika Solovieva, placed fourteenth in the 4×200 m freestyle relay (8:41.21). Two days later, in the 50 m freestyle, Tochenaya shared a forty-first seed with South Korea's Chang Hee-Jin on the morning prelims. She posted a sterling time and a personal best of 26.88 to scorch the field with a leading finish in heat four.
