= Ricardo Acuña (judoka) =

Mexican judoka (born 1971)

Personal information
- Nationality: Mexican
- Born: 23 January 1971 (age 54)

Sport
- Sport: Judo

Ricardo Acuña (born 23 January 1971) is a Mexican judoka. He competed in the 1996 Summer Olympics.
