= Nataliya Korabelnikova =

Kyrgyzstani swimmer

Personal information
- Full name: Nataliya Korabelnikova
- National team: Kyrgyzstan
- Born: 11 May 1980 (age 46)
- Height: 1.64 m (5 ft 5 in)
- Weight: 53 kg (117 lb)

Sport
- Sport: Swimming
- Strokes: Freestyle

Nataliya Korabelnikova (Russian: Наталья Корабельникова; born May 11, 1980) is a Kyrgyz former swimmer, who specialized in middle-distance freestyle events. Korabelnikova competed in two swimming events at the 2000 Summer Olympics in Sydney. She achieved a FINA B-cut of 4:24.63 from the Russian Open Championships in Saint Petersburg. On the second day of the Games, Korabelnikova placed thirty-fifth in the 400 m freestyle. Swimming in heat one, she edged out Singapore's Christel Bouvron on the final lap to pick up a fifth seed by almost a full second, in a lifetime best of 4:24.29. Three days later, Korabelnikova, along with Yekaterina Tochenaya, Anna Korshikova, and Anjelika Solovieva, placed fourteenth in the 4 × 200 m freestyle relay (8:41.21).
