= Philipp Gilgen =

Swiss swimmer (born 1976)

Personal information
- Full name: Philipp Gilgen
- National team: Switzerland
- Born: 12 October 1976 (age 49) Casablanca, Morocco
- Height: 1.89 m (6 ft 2 in)
- Weight: 75 kg (165 lb)

Sport
- Sport: Swimming
- Strokes: Backstroke
- Club: SV Basel

Philipp Gilgen (born October 12, 1976) is a Swiss former swimmer, who specialized in backstroke events. He is a 2000 Olympian and a 17-time Swiss champion in both 100 and 200 m backstroke.

Gilgen competed only in two swimming events at the 2000 Summer Olympics in Sydney. He posted a FINA B-standard entry time of 56.87 from the Swiss National Championships in Zurich. On the second day of the Games, Gilgen placed thirty-fifth the 100 m backstroke. Swimming in heat three, he edged out Sweden's Mattias Ohlin to wrest a third seed by a hundredth of a second (0.01) in 57.50. Gilgen also teamed up with Remo Lütolf, Karel Novy, and Philippe Meyer in the 4×100 m medley relay. Leading off a backstroke leg in heat one, Gilgen recorded a split of 57.31, but the Swiss team settled only for sixth place and sixteenth overall with a final time of 3:42.78.
