= Philippe Meyer (swimmer) =

Swiss swimmer

Personal information
- Full name: Philippe Meyer
- National team: Switzerland
- Born: 9 May 1971 (age 55) Geneva, Switzerland
- Height: 1.85 m (6 ft 1 in)
- Weight: 78 kg (172 lb)

Sport
- Sport: Swimming
- Strokes: Butterfly
- Club: Genève Natation 1885

Philippe Meyer (born 9 May 1971) is a Swiss former swimmer, who specialized in butterfly events. He is a 2000 Olympian, a two-time Swiss record holder in short-course swimming, and a member of Genève Natation 1885.

Meyer competed in two swimming events for Switzerland at the 2000 Summer Olympics in Sydney. He achieved a FINA B-cut of 55.04 (100 m butterfly) from the European Championships in Helsinki. On the sixth day of the Games, Meyer placed thirty-first in the 100 m butterfly. Swimming in heat four, he blasted a new Swiss record of 54.85 to race for a second seed behind Portugal's Simão Morgado by a tenth of a second (0.10). Meyer also teamed up with Remo Lütolf, Karel Novy, and Philipp Gilgen in the 4×100 m medley relay. Swimming a butterfly leg in heat one, Meyer recorded a split of 53.95, a national record, but the Swiss team settled only for sixth place and sixteenth overall in a final time of 3:42.78.
