= Oberkirchen =

Oberkirchen may refer to:

== Places ==
- Oberkirchen (Freisen), is a locality in the municipality Freisen in Saarland, Germany
- Oberkirchen (Schmallenberg), is a locality in the municipality Schmallenberg in North Rhine-Westphalia, Germany

== See also ==
- Obernkirchen
