= Elizaveta Pecherskikh =

Kyrgyzstani swimmer (born 2004)

Personal information
- Born: 25 August 2004 (age 22)

Sport
- Sport: Swimming

Elizaveta Pecherskikh (Rogozhnikova; born 25 August 2004) is a Kyrgyzstani swimmer.

In 2018, she represented Kyrgyzstan at the 2018 Asian Games held in Jakarta, Indonesia without winning a medal.

In 2019, she represented Kyrgyzstan at the 2019 World Aquatics Championships held in Gwangju, South Korea. She competed in the women's 200 metre freestyle event and she did not advance to compete in the semi-finals. She also competed in the women's 200 metre backstroke event and in this event she also did not advance to the semi-finals.
