= Ivan Ivanov (swimmer) =

Kyrgyzstani swimmer (born 1979)

Personal information
- National team: Kyrgyzstan
- Born: 27 April 1979 (age 47) Frunze, Kirghiz SSR, Soviet Union
- Height: 1.85 m (6 ft 1 in)
- Weight: 75 kg (165 lb)

Sport
- Sport: Swimming
- Strokes: Freestyle

Ivan Ivanov (Russian: Иван Иванов; born April 27, 1979) is a Kyrgyz former swimmer, who specialized in long-distance freestyle events. He is a single-time Olympian and a former Kyrgyzstani record holder in the 400 and 1500 m freestyle.

Ivanov competed in a long-distance freestyle double at the 2000 Summer Olympics in Sydney. He posted FINA B-standards of 4:04.35 (400 m freestyle) and 16:10.15 (1500 m freestyle) from the Russian National Championships in Moscow. On the first day of the Games, Ivanov placed forty-fifth in the 400 m freestyle. Swimming in heat one, he held off Nicaragua's Marcelino López by almost ten seconds to take a fifth spot in 4:09.33. Four days later, in the 4 × 200 m freestyle relay, Ivanov, along with Andrei Pakin, Aleksandr Shilin, and Dmitri Kuzmin, were disqualified from heat one for an early takeoff during the lead-off leg. In his final event, 1500 m freestyle, Ivanov participated in the same heat against Czech Republic's Vlastimil Burda and Chinese Taipei's Li Yun-lun. Before the start of the program's longest race, Ivanov was cast out of the field for a "no false-start" rule, leaving Burda and Li as the only two men standing.
