= Franck Chambilly =

French judoka (born 1970)

Medal record

Men's judo

European Championships
Bronze medal – third place	1994 Gdansk	60 kg
Bronze medal – third place	1996 The Hague	60 kg

Franck Chambilly (born 3 September 1970) is a French judoka.

== Achievements ==
Year	Tournament	Place	Weight class
1996	European Judo Championships	3rd	Extra lightweight (60 kg)
1994	European Judo Championships	3rd	Extra lightweight (60 kg)
1993	Mediterranean Games	2nd	Extra lightweight (60 kg)
