= Clifton Sunada =

American judoka (born 1971)

Cliff Sunada
Personal information
- Full name: Clifton S. Sunada
- Born: May 18, 1971 (age 55) Honolulu, Hawaii, U.S.
Medal record
Men's judo
Representing the United States
Pan American Games
Silver medal – second place	1991 Havana	Flyweight

Clifton S. "Cliff" Sunada (born May 18, 1971 in Honolulu, Hawaii) is a retired male judoka from the United States.

Sunada claimed the silver medal in the Men's Flyweight (– 56 kg) division at the 1991 Pan American Games in Havana, Cuba. In the final he was defeated by Puerto Rico's Luis Martínez. He represented his native country at the 1996 Summer Olympics in Atlanta, Georgia.
