= Nigel Donohue =

British judoka

Personal information
- Nationality: British (English)
- Born: 20 December 1969 (age 56) Leigh, Greater Manchester, England
- Height: 160 cm (5 ft 3 in)
- Weight: 60 kg (132 lb)

Sport
- Sport: Judo and wrestling
- Event(s): Extra-lightweight (judo) flyweight/featherweight (wrestling)
- Club: Newton and Urmston
Medal record
Wrestling
Representing England
Commonwealth Games
Bronze medal – third place	1986 Edinburgh	52kg flyweight
Men's judo
European Championships
Gold medal – first place	1995 Birmingham	60 kg
Silver medal – second place	1990 Frankfurt	60 kg
Silver medal – second place	1996 The Hague	60 kg
Bronze medal – third place	1993 Athens	60 kg

Nigel John Patrick Donohue (born 1969) is a British retired judoka and wrestler.

== Wrestling career ==
Donohue represented England and won a bronze medal in the 52 kg flyweight, at the 1986 Commonwealth Games in Edinburgh, Scotland.

Donohue was a three-times winner of the British Wrestling Championships in 1985, 1986 and 1993.

== Judo career ==
Donohue was better known for his participation in judo and competed at the 1992 Summer Olympics and the 1996 Summer Olympics. He was also the champion of Great Britain, winning the British Judo Championships in 1992.

== Achievements ==
Year	Tournament	Place	Weight class
1996	Olympic Games	7th	Extra lightweight (60 kg)
1996	European Judo Championships	2nd	Extra lightweight (60 kg)
1995	European Judo Championships	1st	Extra lightweight (60 kg)
1993	World Judo Championships	5th	Extra lightweight (60 kg)
1993	European Judo Championships	3rd	Extra lightweight (60 kg)
1990	European Judo Championships	2nd	Extra lightweight (60 kg)
