= Anna Korshikova =

Kyrgyzstani swimmer

Personal information
- Full name: Anna Korshikova
- National team: Kyrgyzstan
- Born: 6 July 1982 (age 44) Frunze, Kirghiz SSR, Soviet Union
- Height: 1.70 m (5 ft 7 in)
- Weight: 54 kg (119 lb)

Sport
- Sport: Swimming
- Strokes: Freestyle

Anna Korshikova (Russian: Анна Коршикова; born July 6, 1982) is a Kyrgyz former swimmer, who specialized in middle-distance freestyle events. Korshikova competed in two swimming events at the 2000 Summer Olympics in Sydney. She achieved a FINA B-cut of 2:05.61 from the Russian Open Championships in Saint Petersburg. On the third day of the Games, Korshikova placed thirty-fifth in the 200 m freestyle. Swimming in heat two, she enjoyed the race with an early lead, but faded shortly to a fourth seed in 2:08.08, over three body lengths behind leader Lára Hrund Bjargardóttir of Iceland. Two days later, Korshikova, along with Yekaterina Tochenaya, Nataliya Korabelnikova, and Anjelika Solovieva, placed fourteenth in the 4×200 m freestyle relay (8:41.21).
