= Andrei Pakin =

Kyrgyzstani swimmer

Personal information
- Full name: Andrei Pakin
- National team: Kyrgyzstan
- Born: 3 January 1978 (age 48) Frunze, Kirghiz SSR, Soviet Union
- Height: 1.84 m (6 ft 0 in)
- Weight: 78 kg (172 lb)

Sport
- Sport: Swimming
- Strokes: Freestyle, medley

Andrei Pakin (Russian: Андрей Пакин; born January 3, 1978) is a Kyrgyzstani former swimmer, who specialized in middle-distance freestyle and in individual medley events. Pakin competed in two swimming events at the 2000 Summer Olympics in Sydney. He eclipsed a FINA B-cut of 2:09.26 (200 m individual medley) from the Russian Open Championships in Saint Petersburg. In the 4×200 m freestyle relay, Pakin, along with Aleksandr Shilin, Ivan Ivanov, and Russian import Dmitri Kuzmin, were disqualified from heat one for an early takeoff during the lead-off leg. The following day, in the 200 m individual medley, Pakin placed fortieth on the morning prelims. He posted a sterling time of 2:07.88 to overhaul a fast-pacing George Gleason of the Virgin Islands at the final turn and blister a top finish in heat one.
