= Roberto Naveira =

Spanish judoka (born 1970)

Roberto Antonio Naveira Filgueiras (born 16 September 1970), better known as Roberto Naveira, is a Spanish judoka. He was born in A Coruña.

== Achievements ==
Year	Tournament	Place	Weight class
1993	European Judo Championships	5th	Extra lightweight (60 kg)
