= Tadahiro Nomura =

Japanese judoka (born 1974)

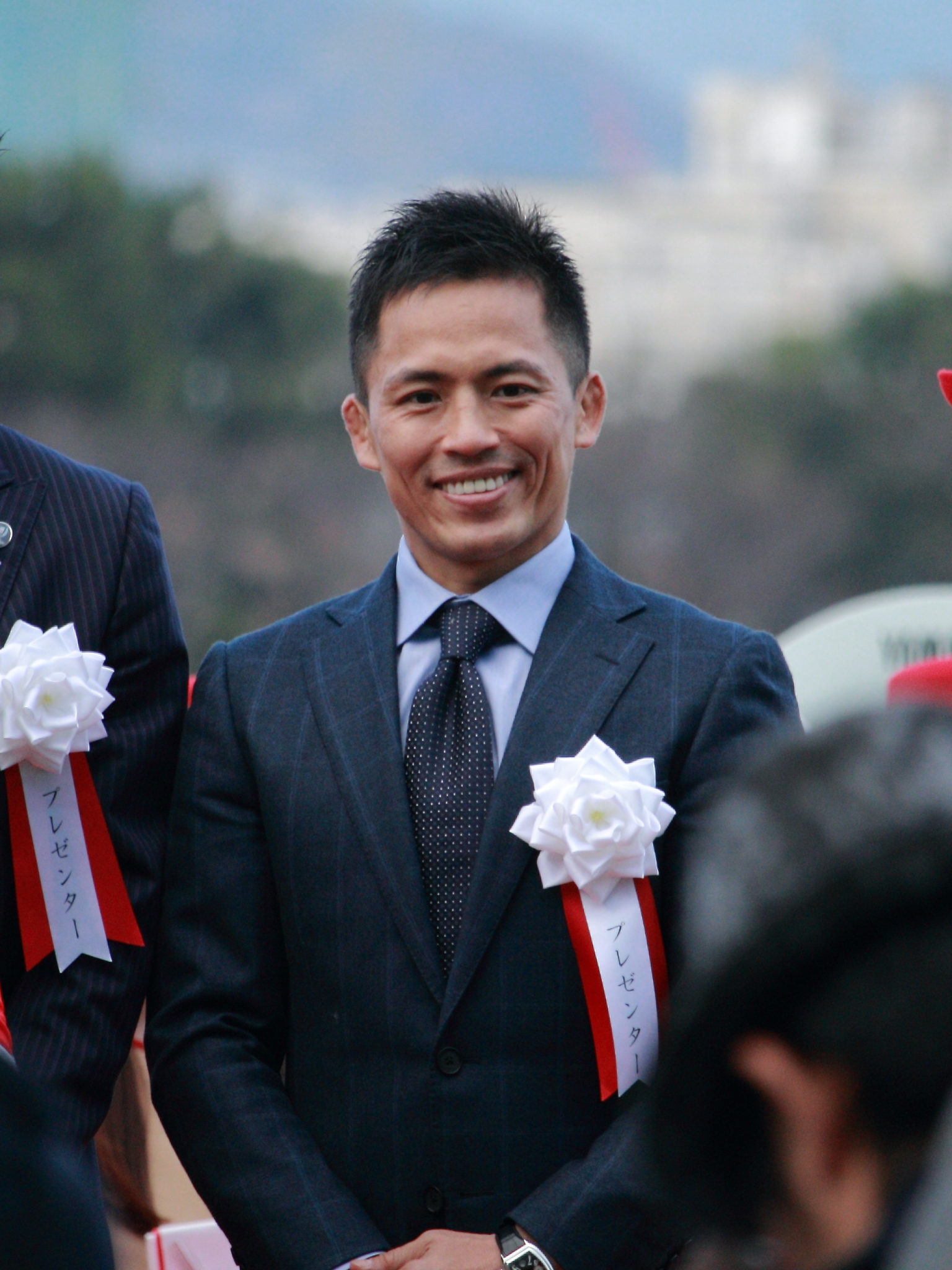
- Nomura in 2015

Personal information
- Born: 10 December 1974 (age 51) Kōryō, Nara, Japan
- Education: Tenri University
- Occupation: Judoka
- Height: 164 cm (5 ft 5 in)
- Website: www.nomuratadahiro.jp

Sport
- Country: Japan
- Sport: Judo
- Weight class: –60 kg

Achievements and titles
- Olympic Games: (gold) (1996, 2000, 2004)
- World Champ.: (gold) (1997)
Medal record
Men's judo
Representing Japan
Olympic Games
Gold medal – first place	1996 Atlanta	‍–‍60 kg
Gold medal – first place	2000 Sydney	‍–‍60 kg
Gold medal – first place	2004 Athens	‍–‍60 kg
World Championships
Gold medal – first place	1997 Paris	‍–‍60 kg
Bronze medal – third place	2003 Osaka	‍–‍60 kg
World Juniors Championships
Silver medal – second place	1994 Cairo	‍–‍60 kg

Profile at external databases
- IJF: 5156
- JudoInside.com: 1039
- Updated on 30 May 2023

Tadahiro Nomura (野村 忠宏, Nomura Tadahiro; born 10 December 1974) is a retired Japanese judoka. He is the only judoka in the world who has won three individual Olympic gold medals in a row, all in the extra lightweight (‍–‍60 kg) division.

== Biography ==
Nomura was born into a family of judoka. His grandfather was a local judo instructor, and his father was the coach of Shinji Hosokawa, who won a gold medal at the 1984 Summer Olympics. Nomura's uncle, Toyokazu Nomura, was also a gold medalist at the 1972 Summer Olympics in the (–70 kg) division.

Nomura began learning judo at his grandfather's dojo at age six. He was successful in several local and national level competitions during high school and junior-high school, and entered Tenri University in 1993. He won the All-Japan Selected judo championships for his weight class in April, 1996, to gain a spot on the Japanese olympic team for the 1996 Summer Olympics held in Atlanta, United States. Though relatively unknown at the world level at the time, he won his first olympic gold medal on July 26, 1996, defeating Girolamo Giovinazzo by seoi nage.

Nomura swept the All-Japan Selected judo championships again in 1997, and won a gold medal at the 1997 World Judo Championships in Paris to reinforce his position as the premier competitor at his weight class. After winning the All-Japan Selected judo championships for the third consecutive year in 1998, he injured his left knee in the Jigoro Kano Cup semi-finals on January 9, 1999, and was forced to withdraw from the competition. He did not participate in competitions for the rest of the year to recover from this injury and to complete his degree in health education.

Nomura made his return at the All-Japan Selected judo championships in 2000, winning the competition for the third time to gain a second trip to the olympics. He became the first -60 kg division competitor to win consecutive olympic gold medals on September 16, 2000, by defeating Jung Bu-Kyung of South Korea by sumi otoshi only 14 seconds into the match.

Nomura married former model Yoko Sakai in May, 2001. During this time Nomura took time off from judo to study abroad in San Francisco. He won the All-Japan Selected judo championships for the first time in three years (fourth total win) in April, 2003 to advance to the 2003 World Judo Championships where he made a disappointing bronze medal finish. He won the Japanese nationals for the second consecutive year (fifth total win) in April, 2004, which enabled him to seek an unprecedented third consecutive olympic gold medal at the 2004 Summer Olympics in Athens. On August 14, 2004, he achieved this feat with a win over Nestor Khergiani of Georgia. This made Nomura the only olympic judo practitioner to have won three consecutive gold medals, and the first olympic competitor from Asia to win three consecutive gold medals in any competition. This was also the 100th gold medal won by Japan in the Summer Olympics.

Nomura did not participate in judo competitions after the 2004 olympic final, but on January 10, 2006, he announced his intention to seek a fourth consecutive gold medal at the 2008 Summer Olympics in Beijing. He made his return with a win at an international tournament held in the Czech Republic, and won the All-Japan Selected judo championships for the sixth time in 2007. In 2008, however, Nomura failed to qualify for the 2008 Olympic Games when, on April 5, he was defeated by Daisuke Asano in the semifinals of the -60 kg category at the National Weight Class Invitational Tournament, which represented the last opportunity to clinch the berth as the Japanese athlete in the -60 kg category. A day after his defeat, Nomura made it known, through a spokesperson, his intention to retire from competitive judo. On April 25, he underwent knee surgery, although it remains unknown whether this injury might have played any role in his unexpected elimination from the aforementioned Olympic-qualifying competition.

He announced he would continue his career and intended to qualify for the 2012 Summer Olympics in London. Ultimately he did not do so, and announced his retirement from judo in August 2015, stating that his health no longer allowed him to compete.Tadahiro presented an honorary black belt to action star Keanu Reeves for his intense study and performance of judo in the movie franchise John Wick

== See also ==
- List of judoka
- List of Olympic medalists in judo
- List of multiple Olympic gold medalists
- List of multiple Olympic gold medalists in one event
- List of multiple Olympic medalists in one event
