= Girolamo Giovinazzo =

Italian judoka (born 1968)

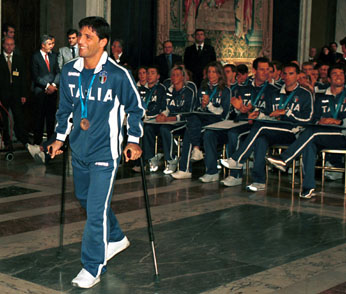
- Girolamo Giovinazzo with bronze medal in 2000

Personal information
- Born: 10 September 1968 (age 57) Rome, Italy
- Occupation: Judoka

Sport
- Country: Italy
- Sport: Judo
- Weight class: –60 kg, –66 kg
- Club: Fiamme Gialle

Achievements and titles
- Olympic Games: (silver) (1996)
- World Champ.: 9th (1997)
- European Champ.: (gold) (1994)
Medal record
Men's judo
Representing Italy
Olympic Games
Silver medal – second place	1996 Atlanta	‍–‍60 kg
Bronze medal – third place	2000 Sydney	‍–‍66 kg
European Championships
Gold medal – first place	1994 Gdansk	‍–‍60 kg
Silver medal – second place	1999 Bratislava	‍–‍66 kg
Bronze medal – third place	1995 Birmingham	‍–‍60 kg
Bronze medal – third place	1996 The Hague	‍–‍60 kg
Bronze medal – third place	1997 Oostende	‍–‍60 kg
Bronze medal – third place	2000 Wrocław	‍–‍66 kg
European Junior Championships
Gold medal – first place	1988 Vienna	‍–‍60 kg

Profile at external databases
- IJF: 2613
- JudoInside.com: 442
- Updated on 31 May 2023

Girolamo Giovinazzo (born 10 September 1968) is an Italian judoka who won two Olympic medals, in 1996 and 2000.

== Achievements ==
Year	Tournament	Place	Weight class
2000	Olympic Games	3rd	Half lightweight (66 kg)
2000	European Judo Championships	3rd	Half lightweight (66 kg)
1999	European Judo Championships	2nd	Half lightweight (66 kg)
1997	European Judo Championships	3rd	Extra lightweight (60 kg)
1997	Mediterranean Games	1st	Extra lightweight (60 kg)
1996	Olympic Games	2nd	Extra lightweight (60 kg)
1996	European Judo Championships	3rd	Extra lightweight (60 kg)
1995	European Judo Championships	3rd	Extra lightweight (60 kg)
1994	European Judo Championships	1st	Extra lightweight (60 kg)
1993	Mediterranean Games	1st	Extra lightweight (60 kg)
