= Dorjpalamyn Narmandakh =

Mongolian judoka (born 1975)

Personal information
- Native name: Доржпаламын Нармандах
- Born: 18 December 1975 (age 50) Darkhan, Mongolia
- Occupation: Judoka
- Height: 162 cm (5 ft 4 in)

Sport
- Country: Mongolia
- Sport: Judo

Achievements and titles
- Olympic Games: (bronze) (1996)
- World Champ.: 5th (1999)
- Asian Champ.: (gold) (1996)
Medal record
Men's judo
Representing Mongolia
Olympic Games
Bronze medal – third place	1996 Atlanta	‍–‍60 kg
Asian Championships
Gold medal – first place	1996 Ho Chi Minh	‍–‍60 kg
Bronze medal – third place	1993 Macau	‍–‍60 kg
Bronze medal – third place	2000 Osaka	‍–‍60 kg
Bronze medal – third place	2001 Ulaanbaatar	‍–‍60 kg

Profile at external databases
- IJF: 2913
- JudoInside.com: 3133
- Updated on 4 June 2023

Dorjpalamyn Narmandakh (Mongolian: Доржпаламын Нармандах; born 18 December 1975) is a Mongolian judoka. At the 1996 Summer Olympics, he won the bronze medal in the men's extra lightweight (‍–‍60 kg) category, together with Richard Trautmann.
