= Manolo Poulot =

Cuban Olympic judoka

Personal information
- Born: 28 June 1974 (age 52)
- Occupation: Judoka

Sport
- Country: Cuba
- Sport: Judo
- Weight class: –60 kg, –66 kg

Achievements and titles
- Olympic Games: (bronze) (2000)
- World Champ.: (1999)
- Pan American Champ.: (1994, 1996, 1997, 1998)
Medal record
Men's judo
Representing Cuba
Olympic Games
Bronze medal – third place	2000 Sydney	‍–‍60 kg
World Championships
Gold medal – first place	1999 Birmingham	‍–‍60 kg
Pan American Games
Gold medal – first place	1999 Winnipeg	‍–‍60 kg
Silver medal – second place	1995 Mara del Plata	‍–‍60 kg
Pan American Championships
Gold medal – first place	1994 Santiago	‍–‍60 kg
Gold medal – first place	1996 San Juan	‍–‍60 kg
Gold medal – first place	1997 Guadalajara	‍–‍60 kg
Gold medal – first place	1998 Santo Domingo	‍–‍66 kg
Summer Universiade
Bronze medal – third place	1999 Palma de Mallorca	‍–‍60 kg

Profile at external databases
- IJF: 39603
- JudoInside.com: 984
- Updated on 31 May 2023

Manolo Poulot Ramos (born 28 June 1974 in Guantánamo) is a Cuban judoka. At the 2000 Summer Olympics he won a bronze medal in the Men's Extra Lightweight (‍–‍60 kg) category, together with Aidyn Smagulov.
