= Aidyn Smagulov =

Kazakhstani judoka

Personal information
- Born: 1 December 1976 (age 49) Oskemen, Shyrgys Qazaqstan, Kazakh SSR, Soviet Union
- Occupation: Judoka

Sport
- Country: Kyrgyzstan
- Sport: Judo
- Weight class: ‍–‍60 kg, ‍–‍66 kg

Achievements and titles
- Olympic Games: (bronze) (2000)
- World Champ.: R16 (1997)
- Asian Champ.: (silver) (2000)
Medal record
Men's judo
Representing Kyrgyzstan
Olympic Games
Bronze medal – third place	2000 Sydney	‍–‍60 kg
Asian Championships
Silver medal – second place	2000 Osaka	‍–‍60 kg

Profile at external databases
- IJF: 15686
- JudoInside.com: 7283
- Updated on 31 May 2023

Aidyn Smagulov (Kazakh: Айдын Смағұлов; born 1 December 1976) is a Kyrgyz and Kazakh judoka. He won the Kazakhstan championship in 1996 and went on to win the bronze medal at the 2000 Summer Olympics in the men's extra lightweight (‍–‍60 kg) category, together with Cuba's Manolo Poulot. He is the first Olympic medalist to represent Kyrgyzstan in the nation's history.

An ethnic Kazakh, Smagulov was born and trained in Kazakhstan. He has represented Kyrgyzstan since 1999.
