= Alisher Mukhtarov =

Uzbekistani judoka

Personal information
- Native name: Алишер Мухтаров
- Nationality: Uzbekistani
- Born: 26 May 1973 (age 52)
- Occupation: Judoka
- Height: 166 cm (5 ft 5 in)
- Weight: 60 kg (132 lb)

Sport
- Country: Uzbekistan
- Sport: Judo

Profile at external databases
- IJF: 53078
- JudoInside.com: 3179

Alisher Mukhtarov (Алишер Мухтаров, born 26 May 1973) is an Uzbekistani judoka. He competed at the 1996 Summer Olympics and the 2000 Summer Olympics.
