= Sergey Ashihmin =

Kyrgyzstani swimmer

Personal information
- Full name: Sergey Ashihmin
- Nickname: Sergey Ashikhmin
- National team: Kyrgyzstan; Russia
- Height: 1.97 m (6 ft 6 in)
- Weight: 87 kg (192 lb)

Sport
- Sport: Swimming
- Strokes: Freestyle
- Club: Volga
- Coach: Edward Bartkevich
Medal record
Men's swimming
Representing Russia
Goodwill Games
Silver medal – second place	1998 New York	4×100 m freestyle
European Championships
Silver medal – second place	1999 Istanbul	4×100 m freestyle

Sergey Ashihmin (Russian: Серге́й Ашихмин; is a Russian-born Kyrgyzstani former swimmer, who specialized in sprint freestyle events. He is a two-time Olympian (1996 and 2000), and a former Kyrgyzstan record holder in the 50 and 100 m freestyle. While playing for the Russian senior team, Ashihmin also earned a silver medal, along with Denis Pimankov, Dmitry Chernyshov, and double Olympic champion Alexander Popov, in the 4×100 m freestyle relay at the 1999 European Aquatics Championships in Istanbul, Turkey.

Ashihmin became one of the first swimmers from Kyrgyzstan to compete at the 1996 Summer Olympics in Atlanta since the post-Soviet era. He failed to reach the top 16 final in the 100 m freestyle, finishing in twenty-ninth place with a time of 51.07. He also placed eighteenth as a member of the Kyrgyzstan team in the 4×100 m freestyle relay (3:30.62), seventeenth in the 4×200 m freestyle relay (8:00.00), and twenty-first in the 4×100 m medley relay (3:56.24).

In 1998, Ashihmin shared silver medals with Popov, Pimankov, and Roman Yegorov for Russia in the sprint freestyle relay (3:17.99), when the U.S. hosted again the Goodwill Games in New York City.

At the 2000 Summer Olympics in Sydney, Ashihmin competed again in four swimming events. He posted FINA B-standards of 23.55 (50 m freestyle) and 51.20 (100 m freestyle) from the Russian National Championships in Moscow. In the 100 m freestyle, Ashihmin placed thirty-fourth on the morning prelims. Swimming in heat six, he shared a third seed with Greece's Spyridon Bitsakis in a matching time of 51.28. Two days later, in the 50 m freestyle, Ashihmin challenged seven other swimmers in heat four, including Kazakhstan's top sprinter Sergey Borisenko. He came up short in second place and forty-first overall with a time of 23.53, trailing Borisenko by seven hundredths of a second (0.07). He also placed twentieth as a member of the Kyrgyzstan team in the 4×100 m freestyle relay (3:25.03) with Alexei Pavlov, and nineteenth in the 4×100 m medley relay (3:46.70).
