= Konstantin Ushkov =

Russian swimmer

Personal information
- Full name: Константин Ушков
- Nationality: Russia
- Born: August 2, 1977 (age 48) Lesnoy, Soviet Union (now in Russia)
- Height: 1.88 m (6 ft 2 in)
- Weight: 78 kg (172 lb)

Sport
- Sport: Swimming
- Strokes: Butterfly
Medal record
Men's swimming
Representing Russia
Olympic Games
Silver medal – second place	1996 Atlanta	4×100 m freestyle

Konstantin Ushkov (Russian: Константин Ушков; born August 2, 1977) is a retired butterfly swimmer from Russia, who won silver medal at the 1996 Summer Olympics in freestyle relay. He also competed for Kyrgyzstan at the 2000 Summer Olympics with Alexei Pavlov.
