= List of Commonwealth Games medallists in judo =

This is the complete list of Commonwealth Games medallists in judo from 1990 to 2014.

== Men's ==
=== Extra Lightweight ===
Games	Gold	Silver	Bronze
1990	Carl Finney (ENG)	Kevin West (CAN)	James Charles (WAL); Narender Singh (IND)
2002	Craig Fallon (ENG)	Akram Shah (IND)	Gary Cole (WAL)
2002	Craig Fallon (ENG)	Akram Shah (IND)	Daniel Simard (CAN)
2014	Ashley McKenzie (ENG)	Navjot Chana (IND)	Razak Abugiri (GHA)
2014	Ashley McKenzie (ENG)	Navjot Chana (IND)	John Buchanan (SCO)

=== Half Lightweight ===
Games	Gold	Silver	Bronze
1990	Brent Cooper (NZL)	Mark Preston (SCO)	Mark Adshead (ENG); Jean Pierre Cantin (CAN)
2002	James Warren (ENG)	David Somerville (SCO)	Timothy Davies (WAL)
2002	James Warren (ENG)	David Somerville (SCO)	Bhupinder Singh (IND)
2014	Colin Oates (ENG)	Andreas Krassas (CYP)	Siyabulela Mabulu (RSA)
2014	Colin Oates (ENG)	Andreas Krassas (CYP)	James Millar (SCO)

=== Lightweight ===
Games	Gold	Silver	Bronze
1990	Roy Stone (ENG)	Majemite Omagbaluwaje (NGR)	Billy Cusack (SCO); Colin Savage (NIR)
2002	Tom Hill (AUS)	Christodoulos Christodoulides (CYP)	Lee McGrorty (SCO)
2002	Tom Hill (AUS)	Christodoulos Christodoulides (CYP)	Jean-François Marceau (CAN)
2014	Danny Williams (ENG)	Adrian Leat (NZL)	Jake Bensted (AUS)
2014	Danny Williams (ENG)	Adrian Leat (NZL)	Jacques van Zyl (RSA)

=== Half Middleweight ===
Games	Gold	Silver	Bronze
1990	David Southby (ENG)	Graeme Spinks (NZL)	Gavin Kelly (AUS)
2002	Graeme Randall (SCO)	Thomas Cousins (ENG)	Luke Preston (WAL)
2002	Graeme Randall (SCO)	Thomas Cousins (ENG)	Tim Slyfield (NZL)
2014	Owen Livesey (ENG)	Tom Reed (ENG)	Boas Munyonga (ZAM)
2014	Owen Livesey (ENG)	Tom Reed (ENG)	Jonah Burt (CAN)

=== Middleweight ===
Games	Gold	Silver	Bronze
1990	Densign White (ENG)	Winston Sweatman (SCO)	Chris Bacon (AUS); Rajinder Dhanger (IND)
2002	Winston Gordon (ENG)	Keith Morgan (CAN)	Steven Vidler (SCO)
2002	Winston Gordon (ENG)	Keith Morgan (CAN)	Rostand Melaping (CMR)
2014	Zack Piontek (RSA)	Matthew Purssey (SCO)	Andrew Burns (SCO)
2014	Zack Piontek (RSA)	Matthew Purssey (SCO)	Gary Hall (ENG)

=== Half Heavyweight ===
Games	Gold	Silver	Bronze
1990	Raymond Stevens (ENG)	Dean Lampkin (AUS)	Graham Campbell (SCO); James Kendrick (CAN)
2002	Nicolas Gill (CAN)	Sam Delahay (ENG)	Antonio Felicité (MRI)
2002	Nicolas Gill (CAN)	Sam Delahay (ENG)	Martin Kelly (AUS)
2014	Euan Burton (SCO)	Shah Hussain Shah (PAK)	Jason Koster (NZL)
2014	Euan Burton (SCO)	Shah Hussain Shah (PAK)	Tim Slyfield (NZL)

=== Heavyweight ===
Games	Gold	Silver	Bronze
1990	Elvis Gordon (ENG)	Tom Greenway (CAN)	Wayne Watson (NZL)
2002	Nacanieli Qerewaqa (FIJ)	Daniel Sargent (ENG)	Daniel Rusitovic (AUS)
2002	Nacanieli Qerewaqa (FIJ)	Daniel Sargent (ENG)	Chukwuemeka Onyemachi (NGR)
2014	Chris Sherrington (SCO)	Ruan Snyman (RSA)	Jake Andrewartha (AUS)
2014	Chris Sherrington (SCO)	Ruan Snyman (RSA)	Mark Shaw (WAL)

=== Open ===
Games	Gold	Silver	Bronze
1990	Elvis Gordon (ENG)	Mario Laroche (CAN)	Graham Campbell (SCO); Majemite Omagbaluwaje (NGR)

== Women's ==
=== Extra Lightweight ===
Games	Gold	Silver	Bronze
1990	Karen Briggs (ENG)	Helen Duston (WAL)	Julie Reardon (AUS); Donna Robertson (SCO)
2002	Carolyne Lepage (CAN)	Clare Lynch (ENG)	Fiona Robinson (SCO)
2002	Carolyne Lepage (CAN)	Clare Lynch (ENG)	Alice Livinus (NGR)
2014	Kimberley Renicks (SCO)	Shushila Likmabam (IND)	Amy Meyer (AUS)
2014	Kimberley Renicks (SCO)	Shushila Likmabam (IND)	Chloe Rayner (AUS)

=== Half Lightweight ===
Games	Gold	Silver	Bronze
1990	Sharon Rendle (ENG)	Claire Shiach (SCO)	Catherine Grainger (AUS); Lisa Griffiths (WAL)
2002	Georgina Singleton (ENG)	Lisa Bradley (NIR)	Karen Cusack (SCO)
2002	Georgina Singleton (ENG)	Lisa Bradley (NIR)	Angela Raguz (AUS)
2014	Louise Renicks (SCO)	Kelly Edwards (ENG)	Lisa Kearney (NIR)
2014	Louise Renicks (SCO)	Kelly Edwards (ENG)	Kalpana Devi (IND)

=== Lightweight ===
Games	Gold	Silver	Bronze
1990	Loretta Cusack (SCO)	Suzanne Williams (AUS)	Ann Hughes (ENG); Moira Sutton (WAL)
2002	Maria Pekli (AUS)	Jenni Brien (SCO)	Luce Baillargeon (CAN)
2002	Maria Pekli (AUS)	Jenni Brien (SCO)	Sophie Cox (ENG)
2014	Nekoda Smythe-Davis (ENG)	Stephanie Inglis (SCO)	Darcina Manuel (NZL)
2014	Nekoda Smythe-Davis (ENG)	Stephanie Inglis (SCO)	Connie Ramsay (SCO)

=== Half Middleweight ===
Games	Gold	Silver	Bronze
1990	Diane Bell (ENG)	Donna Guy-Halkyard (NZL)	Mandy Clayton (CAN); Laurie Pace (MLT)
2002	Karen Roberts (ENG)	Sarah Clark (SCO)	Bilkisu Yusuf (NGR)
2002	Karen Roberts (ENG)	Sarah Clark (SCO)	Claire Scourfield (WAL)
2014	Sarah Clark (SCO)	Hélène Wezeu Dombeu (CMR)	Faith Pitman (ENG)
2014	Sarah Clark (SCO)	Hélène Wezeu Dombeu (CMR)	Katie-Jemima Yeats-Brown (ENG)

=== Middleweight ===
Games	Gold	Silver	Bronze
1990	Sharon Mills (ENG)	Karen Hayde (CAN)	Narelle Hill (AUS); Joyce Malley (NIR)
2002	Samantha Lowe (ENG)	Catherine Roberge (CAN)	Amanda Costello (SCO)
2002	Samantha Lowe (ENG)	Catherine Roberge (CAN)	Sisilia Nasiga (FIJ)
2014	Megan Fletcher (ENG)	Moira de Villiers (NZL)	Sally Conway (SCO)
2014	Megan Fletcher (ENG)	Moira de Villiers (NZL)	Alix Renaud-Roy (CAN)

=== Half Heavyweight ===
Games	Gold	Silver	Bronze
1990	Jane Morris (ENG)	Alison Webb (CAN)	Phillipa Knowles (WAL); Christy Obekpa (NGR)
2002	Michelle Rogers (ENG)	Jo Melen (WAL)	Jacynthe Maloney (CAN)
2002	Michelle Rogers (ENG)	Jo Melen (WAL)	C.O. Foguing (CMR)
2014	Natalie Powell (WAL)	Gemma Gibbons (ENG)	Hortence Atangana (CMR)
2014	Natalie Powell (WAL)	Gemma Gibbons (ENG)	Ana Laura Portuondo Isasi (CAN)

=== Heavyweight ===
Games	Gold	Silver	Bronze
1990	Sharon Lee (ENG)	Geraldine Dekker (AUS)	Ruth Vondy (IOM); Linda Konkol (CAN)
2002	Simone Callender (ENG)	Angharad Sweet (WAL)	Stephanie Hart (SCO)
2002	Simone Callender (ENG)	Angharad Sweet (WAL)	Eunice Ekeoubi (NGR)
2014	Sarah Adlington (SCO)	Jodie Myers (ENG)	Annabelle Laprovidence (MRI)
2014	Sarah Adlington (SCO)	Jodie Myers (ENG)	Rajwinder Kaur (IND)

=== Open ===
Games	Gold	Silver	Bronze
1990	Sharon Lee (ENG)	Jane Patterson (CAN)	Geraldine Dekker (AUS); Nicola Morris (NZL)
