= Judo at the 2002 Commonwealth Games =

Judo competition

Judo Judo at the 2002 Commonwealth Games
- Venue: GMEX
- Location: Manchester, England
- Dates: 30 July – 1 August 2002

Competition at external databases
- Links: JudoInside

Judo at the 2002 Commonwealth Games was the third time that Judo at the Commonwealth Games was included as a sport. It had been held as a demonstration sport at the 1986 Commonwealth Games and made its official debut at the 1990 Commonwealth Games.

The sport took place in the GMEX.

England topped the judo medal table by virtue of winning eight gold medals.

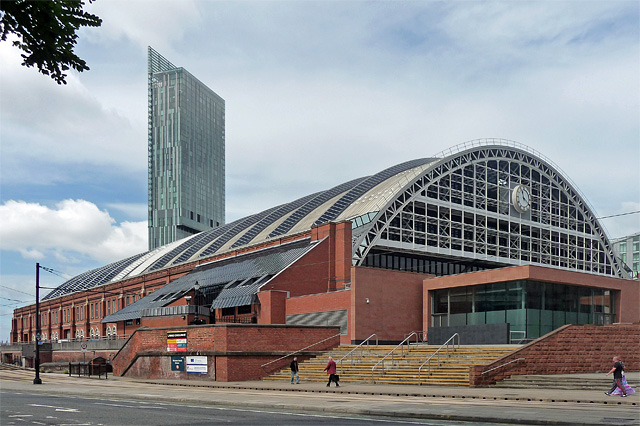
The GMEX centre in 2011

== Medal table ==
* Host nation (England)

| Rank | Nation | Gold | Silver | Bronze | Total |
|---|---|---|---|---|---|
| 1 | England* | 8 | 4 | 1 | 13 |
| 2 | Canada | 2 | 2 | 4 | 8 |
| 3 | Australia | 2 | 0 | 3 | 5 |
| 4 | Scotland | 1 | 3 | 6 | 10 |
| 5 | Fiji | 1 | 0 | 1 | 2 |
| 6 | Wales | 0 | 2 | 4 | 6 |
| 7 | India | 0 | 1 | 1 | 2 |
| 8 | Cyprus | 0 | 1 | 0 | 1 |
| 8 | Northern Ireland | 0 | 1 | 0 | 1 |
| 10 | Nigeria | 0 | 0 | 4 | 4 |
| 11 | Cameroon | 0 | 0 | 2 | 2 |
| 12 | Mauritius | 0 | 0 | 1 | 1 |
| 12 | New Zealand | 0 | 0 | 1 | 1 |
| Totals (13 entries) | | 14 | 14 | 28 | 56 |

== Medallists ==
| Event | Gold | Silver | Bronze |
|---|---|---|---|
Men
| 60 kg | Craig Fallon; England | Akram Shah; India | Gary Cole; Wales |
| 60 kg | Craig Fallon; England | Akram Shah; India | Daniel Simard; Canada |
| 66 kg | James Warren; England | David Somerville; Scotland | Timothy Davies; Wales |
| 66 kg | James Warren; England | David Somerville; Scotland | Bhupinder Singh; India |
| 73 kg | Tom Hill; Australia | Christodoulos Christodoulides; Cyprus | Lee McGrorty; Scotland |
| 73 kg | Tom Hill; Australia | Christodoulos Christodoulides; Cyprus | Jean-François Marceau; Canada |
| 81 kg | Graeme Randall; Scotland | Thomas Cousins; England | Luke Preston; Wales |
| 81 kg | Graeme Randall; Scotland | Thomas Cousins; England | Tim Slyfield; New Zealand |
| 90 kg | Winston Gordon; England | Keith Morgan; Canada | Steven Vidler; Scotland |
| 90 kg | Winston Gordon; England | Keith Morgan; Canada | Rostand Melaping; Cameroon |
| 100 kg | Nicolas Gill; Canada | Sam Delahay; England | Antonio Felicité; Mauritius |
| 100 kg | Nicolas Gill; Canada | Sam Delahay; England | Martin Kelly; Australia |
| 100 kg | Nacanieli Qerewaqa; Fiji | Daniel Sargent; England | Daniel Rusitovic; Australia |
| 100 kg | Nacanieli Qerewaqa; Fiji | Daniel Sargent; England | Emeka Onyemaechi; Nigeria |
Women
| 48 kg | Carolyne Lepage; Canada | Clare Lynch; England | Fiona Robertson; Scotland |
| 48 kg | Carolyne Lepage; Canada | Clare Lynch; England | Alice Livinus; Nigeria |
| 52 kg | Georgina Singleton; England | Lisa Bradley; Northern Ireland | Karen Cusack; Scotland |
| 52 kg | Georgina Singleton; England | Lisa Bradley; Northern Ireland | Angela Raguz; Australia |
| 57 kg | Maria Pekli; Australia | Jenni Brien; Scotland | Luce Baillargeon; Canada |
| 57 kg | Maria Pekli; Australia | Jenni Brien; Scotland | Sophie Cox; England |
| 63 kg | Karen Roberts; England | Sarah Clark; Scotland | Biliksu Ayijimoh Yusuff; Nigeria |
| 63 kg | Karen Roberts; England | Sarah Clark; Scotland | Claire Scourfield; Wales |
| 70 kg | Samantha Lowe; England | Catherine Roberge; Canada | Amanda Costello; Scotland |
| 70 kg | Samantha Lowe; England | Catherine Roberge; Canada | Sisilia Nasiga; Fiji |
| 78 kg | Michelle Rogers; England | Jo Melen; Wales | Jacynthe Maloney; Canada |
| 78 kg | Michelle Rogers; England | Jo Melen; Wales | Christelle Okodombe Foguing; Cameroon |
| +78 kg | Simone Callender; England | Angharad Sweet; Wales | Stephanie Hart; Scotland |
| +78 kg | Simone Callender; England | Angharad Sweet; Wales | Eunice Ekeoubi; Nigeria |

== Men's 60 kg ==
| Round | Winner | Loser |
|---|---|---|
| preliminary | (Canada) Daniel Guilliaume Simard | (Papua New Guinea) Numa Keneke |
| preliminary | (Seychelles) Francis Labrosse | (Ghana) Alex Amoako |
| preliminary | (England) Craig Fallon | (Scotland) John Buchanan |
| preliminary | (Cameroon) Jean-Claude Cameroun | (South Africa) Bulelani Makoba |
| preliminary | (Zimbabwe) Michael Nyabvum | (Tanzania) Ahmad Mwinyi Mzale |
| preliminary | (Wales) Gary Cole | (Cyprus) Theodoros Mandrides |
| preliminary | (Australia) Frankie Serrano | (Northern Ireland) Stuart Vickers |
| preliminary | (Canada) Daniel Guilliaume Simard | (Seychelles) Francis Labrosse |
| preliminary | (England) Craig Fallon | (Cameroon) Jean-Claude Cameroun |
| preliminary | (Wales) Gary Cole | (Zimbabwe) Michael Nyabvumo |
| preliminary | (Seychelles) Francis Labrosse | (Papua New Guinea) Numa Keneke |
| preliminary | (Cameroon) Jean-Claude Cameroun | (Scotland) John Buchanan |
| preliminary | (Cyprus) Theodoros Mandrides | (Zimbabwe) Michael Nyabvumo |
| preliminary | (England) Craig Fallon | (Canada) Daniel Guilliaume Simard |
| preliminary | (India) Akram Shah | (Wales) Gary Cole |
| repechage | (Cameroon) Jean-Claude Cameroun | (Seychelles) Francis Labrosse |
| repechage | (Cyprus) Theodoros Mandrides | (Australia) Frankie Serrano |
| bronze | (Wales) Gary Cole | (Cameroon) Jean-Claude Cameroun |
| bronze | (Canada) Daniel Guilliaume Simard | (Cyprus) Theodoros Mandrides |
| gold | (England) Craig Fallon | (India) Akram Shah |

== Men's 66 kg ==
| Round | Winner | Loser |
|---|---|---|
| preliminary | (Australia) Heath Young | (Nigeria) Abbas Salihu |
| preliminary | (Scotland) David Somerville | (Ghana) Emmanuel Kojo Nartey |
| preliminary | (Pakistan) Muhammad Zeeshan Butt | (New Zealand) Andrew Ross |
| preliminary | (England) James Warren | (Cyprus) Constantinos Kouyialis |
| preliminary | (Mauritius) Laval Collet | (Zambia) Gabriel Kunda |
| preliminary | (Northern Ireland) Scott Mayne | (Kenya) Joseph Momanyi Mabiria |
| preliminary | (Australia) Heath Young | (Ghana) Emmanuel Kojo Nartey |
| preliminary | (Cyprus) Constantinos Kouyialis | (Mauritius) Laval Collet |
| preliminary | (Scotland) David Somerville | (Australia) Heath Young |
| preliminary | (Wales) Timothy Davies | (Pakistan) Muhammad Zeeshan Butt |
| preliminary | (England) James Warren | (Mauritius) Laval Collet |
| preliminary | (India) Bhupinder Singh | (Northern Ireland) Scott Mayne |
| preliminary | (England) James Warren | (India) Bhupinder Singh |
| repechage | (Australia) Heath Young | (Pakistan) Muhammad Zeeshan Butt |
| repechage | (Northern Ireland) Scott Mayne | (Cyprus) Constantinos Kouyialis |
| bronze | (India) Bhupinder Singh | (Australia) Heath Young |
| bronze | (Wales) Timothy Davies | (Cyprus) Constantinos Kouyialis |
| gold | (England) James Warren | (Scotland) David Somerville |

== Men's 73 kg ==
| Round | Winner | Loser |
|---|---|---|
| preliminary | (England) Lee Burbridge | (Nigeria) Shuaibu Sule Musa |
| preliminary | (Cameroon) Bernard Mvondo Etoga | (Northern Ireland) Chris Donnelly |
| preliminary | (Wales) Craig Ewers | (Zambia) Hitra Shakanungu |
| preliminary | (Australia) Tom Hill | (India) Yashpal Solanki |
| preliminary | (Scotland) Lee McGrorty | (Tonga) Akapei Latu |
| preliminary | (Canada) Jean-François Marceau | (Mauritius) Mike Mounawah |
| preliminary | (Barbados) Jamal Grosvenor | (Ghana) Seth Kwame Mensah Ahiavor |
| preliminary | (Cyprus) Christodoulos Christodoulides | (Tanzania) Juma Mussa Mohamed |
| preliminary | (Australia) Tom Hill | (Wales) Craig Ewers |
| preliminary | (Scotland) Lee McGrorty | (Canada) Jean-François Marceau |
| preliminary | (Cyprus) Christodoulos Christodoulides | (Barbados) Jamal Grosvenor |
| repechage | (Cameroon) Bernard Mvondo Etoga | (Nigeria) Shuaibu Sule Musa |
| repechage | (Wales) Craig Ewers | (India) Yashpal Solanki |
| repechage | (Canada) Jean-François Marceau | (Tonga) Akapei Latu |
| repechage | (Barbados) Jamal Grosvenor | (Tanzania) Juma Mussa Mohamed |
| semi-final | (Australia) Tom Hill | (England) Lee Burbridge |
| semi-final | (Cyprus) Christodoulos Christodoulides | (Scotland) Lee McGrorty |
| repechage | (Canada) Jean-François Marceau | (Barbados) Jamal Grosvenor |
| repechage | (Wales) Craig Ewers | (Cameroon) Bernard Mvondo Etoga |
| bronze | (Scotland) Lee McGrorty | (Wales) Craig Ewers |
| bronze | (Canada) Jean-François Marceau | (England) Lee Burbridge |
| gold | (Australia) Tom Hill | (Cyprus) Christodoulos Christodoulides |

== Men's 81 kg ==
| Round | Winner | Loser |
|---|---|---|
| preliminary | (Wales) Luke Preston | (Australia) Morgan Endicott-Davies |
| preliminary | (South Africa) Francois French | (Kenya) Hezron Manani |
| preliminary | (England) Thomas Cousins | (Seychelles) Gerard Baker |
| preliminary | (New Zealand) Tim Slyfield | (Ghana) David Buenor Agbugbuah |
| preliminary | (Nigeria) Majemite Omagbaluwaje | (Northern Ireland) Simon Childs |
| repechage | (Australia) Morgan Endicott Davies | (South Africa) Francois French |
| repechage | (Tonga) Epoki Fakaosi | (Seychelles) Gerard Baker |
| repechage | (India) Vinod Solanki | (Ghana) David Buenor Agbugbuah |
| quarter-final | (Wales) Luke Preston | (South Africa) Francois French |
| quarter-final | (England) Thomas Cousins | (Tonga) Epoki Fakaosi |
| quarter-final | (New Zealand) Tim Slyfield | (India) Vinod Solanki |
| quarter-final | (Scotland) Graeme Randall | (Nigeria) Majemite Omagbaluwaje |
| semi-final | (Scotland) Graeme Randall | (New Zealand) Tim Slyfield |
| semi-final | (England) Thomas Cousins | (Wales) Luke Preston |
| repechage | (Australia) Morgan Endicott Davies | (Tonga) Epoki Fakaosi |
| repechage | (India) Vinod Solanki | (Nigeria) Majemite Omagbaluwaje |
| bronze | (New Zealand) Tim Slyfield | (Australia) Morgan Endicott Davies |
| bronze | (Wales) Luke Preston | (India) Vinod Solanki |
| gold | (Scotland) Graeme Randall | (England) Thomas Cousins |

== Men's 90 kg ==
| Round | Winner | Loser |
|---|---|---|
| preliminary | (Scotland) Steven Vidler | (India) Virender Singh |
| preliminary | (Canada) Keith Morgan | (Nigeria) Gbenga Oteje |
| preliminary | (England) Winston Gordon | (New Zealand) Gareth Knight |
| preliminary | (Canada) Keith Morgan | (Zambia) Elijah Chirwa |
| preliminary | (England) Winston Gordon | (Fiji) Nemani Takayawa |
| preliminary | (Cameroon) Rostand Melaping | (Northern Ireland) Paul Green |
| preliminary | (Nigeria) Gbenga Oteje | (Zambia) Elijah Chirwa |
| preliminary | (New Zealand) Gareth Knight | (Fiji) Nemani Takayawa |
| semi-final | (Canada) Keith Morgan | (Scotland) Steven Vidler |
| semi-final | (England) Winston Gordon | (Cameroon) Rostand Melaping |
| repechage | (Wales) Steven Withers | (Nigeria) Gbenga Oteje |
| repechage | (New Zealand) Gareth Knight | (Northern Ireland) Paul Green |
| bronze | (Cameroon) Rostand Melaping | (Wales) Steven Withers |
| bronze | (Scotland) Steven Vidler | (New Zealand) Gareth Knight |
| gold | (England) Winston Gordon | (Canada) Keith Morgan |

== Men's 100 kg ==
| Round | Winner | Loser |
|---|---|---|
| preliminary | (Canada) Nicolas Gill | (Zimbabwe) Patrick Zindoga |
| preliminary | (Mauritius) Antonio Felicité | (Northern Ireland) Mark Montgomery |
| preliminary | (Australia) Martin Kelly | (South Africa) Justin Goosen |
| preliminary | (England) Sam Delahay | (Scotland) Tommy Allan |
| semi-final | (Canada) Nicolas Gill | (Mauritius) Antonio Felicité |
| repechage | (South Africa) Justin Goosen | (Scotland) Tommy Allan |
| repechage | (Northern Ireland) Mark Montgomery | (Wales) Julian Pae |
| bronze | (Australia) Martin Kelly | (Northern Ireland) Mark Montgomery |
| bronze | (Mauritius) Antonio Felicité | (South Africa) Justin Goosen |
| gold | (Canada) Nicolas Gill | (England) Sam Delahay |

== Men's +100 kg ==
| Round | Winner | Loser |
|---|---|---|
| preliminary | (Fiji) Nacanieli Qerewaqa | (Scotland) Gary Edwards |
| preliminary | (England) Daniel Sargent | (Scotland) Gary Edwards |
| preliminary | (Fiji) Nacanieli Qerewaqa | (England) Daniel Sargent |
| preliminary | (Australia) Daniel Rusitovic | (Nigeria) Emeka Onyemaechi |
| preliminary | (Australia) Daniel Rusitovic | (Wales) Adrian Morgan |
| preliminary | (Nigeria) Emeka Onyemaechi | (Wales) Adrian Morgan |
| semi-final | (Fiji) Nacanieli Qerewaqa | (Nigeria) Emeka Onyemaechi |
| semi-final | (England) Daniel Sargent | (Australia) Daniel Rusitovic |
| gold | (Fiji) Nacanieli Qerewaqa | (England) Daniel Sargent |

== Women's 48 kg ==
| Round | Winner | Loser |
|---|---|---|
| elimination pool | (Nigeria) Alice Livinus | (Mauritius) Dolly Moothoo |
| elimination pool | (Scotland) Fiona Robertson | (India) Kamla Rawat |
| elimination pool | (Scotland) Fiona Robertson | (Nigeria) Alice Livinus |
| elimination pool | (India) Kamla Rawat | (Mauritius) Dolly Moothoo |
| elimination pool | (Nigeria) Alice Livinus | (India) Kamla Rawat |
| elimination pool | (Scotland) Fiona Robertson | (Mauritius) Dolly Moothoo |
| elimination pool | (England) Clare Lynch | (New Zealand) Rochelle Stormont |
| elimination pool | (England) Clare Lynch | (Canada) Carolyne Lepage |
| elimination pool | (Canada) Carolyne Lepage | (New Zealand) Rochelle Stormont |
| semi-final | (Canada) Carolyne Lepage | (Scotland) Fiona Robertson |
| semi-final | (England) Clare Lynch | (Nigeria) Alice Livinus |
| Gold medal | (Canada) Carolyne Lepage | (England) Clare Lynch |

== Women's 52 kg ==
| Round | Winner | Loser |
|---|---|---|
| preliminary | (Wales) Sue Crofts | (Scotland) Karen Cusack |
| preliminary | (England) Georgie Singleton | (India) Angom Anita Chanu |
| preliminary | (Northern Ireland) Lisa Bradley | (Nigeria) Lovelyn Orji-Ben |
| preliminary | (Canada) Aminata Sall | (Australia) Angela Raguz |
| preliminary | (Northern Ireland) Lisa Bradley | (Canada) Aminata Sall |
| repechage | (Australia) Angela Raguz | (Nigeria) Lovelyn Orji-Ben |
| bronze | (Australia) Angela Raguz | (Wales) Sue Crofts |
| bronze | (Scotland) Karen Cusack | (Canada) Aminata Sall |
| gold | (England) Georgina Singleton | (Northern Ireland) Lisa Bradley |

== Women's 57 kg ==
| Round | Winner | Loser |
|---|---|---|
| quarter-final | (England) Sophie Cox | (Nigeria) Maryann Ekeaada |
| quarter-final | (Scotland) Jenni Brien | (Wales) Non Evans |
| quarter-final | (Canada) Luce Baillargeon | (New Zealand) Mellisa Jones |
| quarter-final | (Australia) Maria Pekli | (India) Devi Brojeshori |
| repechage | (India) Devi Brojeshori | (New Zealand) Mellisa Jones |
| repechage | (Nigeria) Maryann Ekeaada | (Wales) Non Evans |
| repechage | (Australia) Maria Pekli | (Canada) Luce Baillargeon |
| repechage | (England) Sophie Cox | (India) Devi Brojeshori |
| semi-final | (Scotland) Jenni Brien | (England) Sophie Cox |
| semi-final | (Australia) Maria Pekli | (Canada) Luce Baillargeon |
| bronze | (Canada) Luce Baillargeon | (Nigeria) Maryann Ekeaada |
| bronze | (England) Sophie Cox | (India) Devi Brojeshori |
| gold | (Australia) Maria Pekli | (Scotland) Jenni Brien |

== Women's 63 kg ==
| Round | Winner | Loser |
|---|---|---|
| elimination pool | (Scotland) Sarah Clark | (Singapore) Cheryl Goh |
| elimination pool | (Nigeria) Biliksu Ayijimoh Yusuf | (Australia) Carly Dixon |
| elimination pool | (Nigeria) Biliksu Ayijimoh Yusuf | (Scotland) Sarah Clark |
| elimination pool | (Australia) Carly Dixon | (Singapore) Cheryl Goh |
| elimination pool | (Scotland) Sarah Clark | (Australia) Carly Dixon |
| elimination pool | (Nigeria) Biliksu Ayijimoh Yusuf | (Singapore) Cheryl Goh |
| elimination pool | (Wales) Claire Scourfield | (South Africa) Henriette Moller |
| elimination pool | (England) Karen Roberts | (South Africa) Henriette Moller |
| elimination pool | (England) Karen Roberts | (Wales) Claire Scourfield |
| semi-final | (Scotland) Sarah Clark | (Wales) Claire Scourfield |
| semi-final | (England) Karen Roberts | (Nigeria) Biliksu Ayijimoh Yusuf |
| gold | (England) Karen Roberts | (Scotland) Sarah Clark |

== Women's 70 kg ==
| Round | Winner | Loser |
|---|---|---|
| preliminary | (Fiji) Sisilia Nasiga | (New Zealand) Elinore Stallworthy |
| preliminary | (England) Samantha Lowe | (Northern Ireland) Claire Rainey |
| preliminary | (Australia) Catherine Arlove | (Wales) Marianne Sharpe |
| preliminary | (Canada) Catherine Roberge | (Nigeria) Roseline Obaje |
| repechage | (Fiji) Sisilia Nasiga | (Northern Ireland) Claire Rainey |
| repechage | (Wales) Marianne Sharpe | (Nigeria) Roseline Obaje |
| semi-final | (England) Samantha Lowe | (Scotland) Amanda Costello |
| semi-final | (Canada) Catherine Roberge | (Australia) Catherine Arlove |
| bronze | (Fiji) Sisilia Nasiga | (Australia) Catherine Arlove |
| bronze | (Scotland) Amanda Costello | (Wales) Marianne Sharpe |
| gold | (England) Samantha Lowe | (Canada) Catherine Roberge |

== Women's 78 kg ==
| Round | Winner | Loser |
|---|---|---|
| quarter-final | (England) Michelle Rogers | (Canada) Jacynthe Maloney |
| quarter-final | (Cameroon) Christelle Okodombe Foguing | (Fiji) Laisa Laveti |
| quarter-final | (Wales) Jo Melen | (Scotland) Lindsay Sorrell |
| quarter-final | (Mauritius) Marie Michele St. Louis | (Australia) Chantal Castledine |
| repechage | (Canada) Jacynthe Maloney | (Fiji) Laisa Laveti |
| repechage | (Scotland) Lindsay Sorrell | (Australia) Chantal Castledine |
| semi-final | (Wales) Jo Melen | (Mauritius) Marie Michele St. Louis |
| semi-final | (England) Michelle Rogers | (Cameroon) Christelle Okodombe Foguing |
| bronze | (Canada) Jacynthe Maloney | (Mauritius) Marie Michele St. Louis |
| bronze | (Cameroon) Christelle Okodombe Foguing | (Scotland) Lindsay Sorrell |
| gold | (England) Michelle Rogers | (Wales) Jo Melen |

== Women's +78 kg ==
| Round | Winner | Loser |
|---|---|---|
| round-robin | (Scotland) Stephanie Hart | (South Africa) Elizabeth Visser |
| round-robin | (England) Simone Callender | (Nigeria) Eunice Ekeoubi |
| round-robin | (Wales) Angharad Sweet | (Scotland) Stephanie Hart |
| round-robin | (Nigeria) Eunice Ekeoubi | (South Africa) Elizabeth Visser |
| round-robin | (England) Simone Callender | (Wales) Angharad Sweet |
| round-robin | (Scotland) Stephanie Hart | (Nigeria) Eunice Ekeoubi |
| round-robin | (Wales) Angharad Sweet | (South Africa) Elizabeth Visser |
| round-robin | (England) Simone Callender | (Scotland) Stephanie Hart |
| round-robin | (Wales) Angharad Sweet | (Nigeria) Eunice Ekeoubi |
| round-robin | (England) Simone Callender | (South Africa) Elizabeth Visser |
