= Wales at the 2002 Commonwealth Games =

- CG code: WAL
- CGA: Commonwealth Games Council for Wales
- Website: teamwales.net

in Manchester, England
- Competitors: 228
- Medals Ranked 9th: Gold 6 Silver 13 Bronze 12 Total 31

Commonwealth Games appearances (overview)
- 1930; 1934; 1938; 1950; 1954; 1958; 1962; 1966; 1970; 1974; 1978; 1982; 1986; 1990; 1994; 1998; 2002; 2006; 2010; 2014; 2018; 2022; 2026; 2030

Wales competed at the 2002 Commonwealth Games in Manchester, England, from 25 July to 4 August 2002.

228 athletes participated for Wales at the Games.

Wales came 9th overall with 6 gold, 13 silver and 12 bronze medals.

== Medals ==
	Gold	Silver	Bronze	Total
Wales	6	13	12	31

=== Medals by event ===
Medals by sport
Sport	1st place, gold medalist(s)	2nd place, silver medalist(s)	3rd place, bronze medalist(s)	Total
Athletics	0	4	0	4
Badminton	0	0	1	1
Boxing	1	0	1	2
Cycling	1	1	0	2
Judo	0	2	4	6
Lawn bowls	0	1	4	5
Shooting	1	0	1	2
Swimming	0	0	1	1
Table tennis	0	1	0	1
Triathlon	0	1	0	1
Weightlifting	3	3	0	6
Total	6	13	12	31

Medals by day
Day	1st place, gold medalist(s)	2nd place, silver medalist(s)	3rd place, bronze medalist(s)	Total
27 July	0	0	1	1
28 July	0	0	0	0
29 July	0	1	0	1
30 July	1	1	3	5
31 July	1	4	3	8
1 August	2	5	0	7
2 August	0	0	0	0
3 August	2	1	2	5
4 August	0	1	3	4
Total	6	13	12	31

Medals by gender
Gender	1st place, gold medalist(s)	2nd place, silver medalist(s)	3rd place, bronze medalist(s)	Total
Female	3	6	3	12
Male	3	7	9	19
Mixed	0	0	0	0
Total	6	13	12	31

=== Medallists ===
==== Gold ====
- Jamie Arthur, Boxing – Lightweight 60 kg
- Nicole Cooke, cycling – road race
- Johanne Brekke & Ceri Dallimore, shooting – women's smallbore rifle, prone pairs
- Michaela Breeze, weightlifting – 58 kg snatch
- Dave Morgan, weightlifting – 77 kg clean and jerk
- Dave Morgan, weightlifting – 77 kg combined

==== Silver ====
- Colin Jackson, athletics – 110 m hurdles
- Matt Elias, athletics – 400 m hurdles
- Iwan Thomas, Matt Elias, Jamie Baulch and Tim Benjamin, athletics – 4 × 400 m relay
- Hayley Tullett, athletics – 1500 m
- Huw Pritchard, cycling – 20 km scratch race
- Adam Robertson & Ryan Jenkins, table tennis – men's doubles
- Dave Morgan, weightlifting – 77 kg snatch
- Michaela Breeze, weightlifting – 58 kg clean and jerk
- Michaela Breeze, weightlifting – 58 kg combined
- Leanda Cave, women's triathlon
- Lawn bowls – men's triples EAD
- Jo Melen, judo – women's – up to 78 kg
- Angharad Sweet, judo – women's – over 78 kg

==== Bronze ====
- David Roberts, swimming – multi-disability 100 m freestyle
- Richard Vaughan, badminton – men's singles
- Kevin Evans, boxing – super heavyweight over 91 kg
- Robert Weale, Lawn Bowls – men's singles
- Anwen Butten & Joanna Weale, lawn bowls – women's doubles
- Lawn Bowls – men's fours
- Lawn Bowls – women's fours
- Michael Wixey & James Birkett-Evans, Shooting – men's Olympic trap pairs
- Gary Cole, judo – men's -60 kg
- Claire Scourfield, Judo – women's up to 63 kg
- Timothy Davies, judo – men's up to 66 kg
- Luke Preston, Judo – men's up to 81 kg

== Team and results by event ==
=== Athletics ===
Men

Athlete	Events	Club
Tim Benjamin	400m, 4x400	
Jamie Baulch	400m, 4x400	
Matthew Elias	400 hurdles, 4x400	
Paul Gray	110m hurdles	
Jamie Henthorn	100, 200m, 4x100	
James Hillier	400 hurdles	
Christian Malcolm	200m, 4x100	
Colin Jackson	110m hurdles	
Andres Jones	5000, 10,000m	
Robert Mitchell	High Jump	
Donald Naylor	5000m, 3000m steeplechase	
Lee Newman	shot put, discus throw	
Steven Shalders	triple jump	
Matthew Shone	800m, 1500m	
Christian Stephenson	3000m steeplechase	
Iwan Thomas	4x400	
Tim Thomas	pole vault	
Douglas Turner	200m, 4x100	
Kevin S. Williams	100m, 4x100	

Women

Athlete	Events	Club
Emma Davies	800m	
Catherine Dugdale	5000m	
Rachel King	100m hurdles	
Natalie Lewis	1500m	
Catherine Murphy	400m	
Rachel Newcombe	1500m	
Hayley Tullett	1500m	

=== Badminton ===
Men

Athlete	Events	Club
Neil Cottrill	doubles, mixed	Conwy
Mathew Hughes	doubles, mixed	Cardiff
Liam Ingram	singles, doubles, mixed	Bedwas
Martyn Lewis	singles, doubles	Caerphilly
Richard Vaughan	singles	Llanbradach

Women

Athlete	Events	Club
Robyn Ashworth	doubles, mixed	Newport
Felicity Gallup	doubles	Cardiff
Kelly Morgan	singles	Tonteg
Jo Muggeridge	doubles, mixed	Cardiff
Kerry Ann Sheppard	singles, doubles, mixed	Cardiff

=== Boxing ===
Men only

Athlete	Events	Club
Michael John Allen	75kg middleweight	Palace ABC, Denbighshire
Jamie Arthur	60kg lightweight	Coed Eva ABC, Cwmbran
Peter Allan Ashton	57kg featherweight	St Joseph's ABC, Cardiff
Vivian Bryan	63.5kg light-welterweight	St Joseph's ABC, Newport
Tony Doherty	67kg welterweight	Pontypool and Panteg ABC
Matthew Charles Edmonds	51kg flyweight	St Joseph's ABC, Newport
Darren Edwards	54kg bantamweight	Cwmavon Hornets, Port Talbot
Kevin Evans	+91kg super heavyweight	Carmarthen ABC
Lee Jones	71kg light middleweight	Kyber Colts, Mountain Ash
Lee Andrew Milsjen	91kg heavyweight	Coed Eva ABC, Cwmbran
James Clifford Whitfield	81kg light heavyweight	Army

=== Cycling ===
Men

Athlete	Events	Club
Yanto Barker	time trial, road race	
Tim Davies	mountain bike	
James Griffiths	time trial, road race	
Joby Ingram-Dodd	1km time trial, sprint, team pursuit	
Ian Jeremiah	mountain bike	
Anthony Malarczyk	time trial, road race	
Jamie Norfolk	mountain bike	
Huw Pritchard	time trial, road race, points, team pursuit	
Paul Sheppard	time trial, road race, points, team pursuit	
Julian Winn	time trial, road race	
William Wright	scratch, points, team pursuit	

Women

Athlete	Events	Club
Nicole Cooke	road TT, road race	
Nina Davies	road TT, road race	
Penny Edwards	road race, mountain bike	
Denise Hampson	500m time trial, sprint	

=== Gymnastics ===
Men

Athlete	Events	Club
Gareth Davies	all-around	
Dean Manning	all-around	
David Muir	all-around	
Jason Tucker	floor	

Women

Athlete	Events	Club
Renay Jones	all-around, vault	
Melanie Roberts	all-around	
Holly Templeton	all-around	

=== Hockey ===
Men

Athlete	Events	Club
George Harris (gk)	Team	Whitchurch Hockey Club
Paul Edwards	Team	Cannock Hockey Club
Richard John	Team	Stourport Hockey Club
Rhys Joyce	Team	
Matthew Grace	Team	
Zak Jones	Team captain	Canterbury Hockey Club
Mark Hoskin	Team	Guildford Hockey Club
Jamie Westerman	Team	Stourport Hockey Club
James Davies-Yandle	Team	Loughborough Students
Josh Smith	Team	Whitchurch Hockey Club
Simon Organ	Team	Cannock Hockey Club
Chris Ashcroft	Team	Bowdon Hockey Club
Howard Hoskin	Team	Reading Hockey Club
James Ogden	Team	Brooklands Hockey Club
Owen Griffiths-Jones	Team	
Huw Jones	Team	Teddington Hockey Club
Bryn Williams	Team manager	

=== Judo ===
Men

Athlete	Events	Club
Gary Cole	60kg	
Timothy Davies	66kg	
Craig Ewers	73kg	
Adrian Morgan	over 100kg	
Julian Pae	100kg	
Luke Preston	81kg	
Steven Withers	90kg	

Women

Athlete	Events	Club
Sue Crofts	52kg	
Non Evans	57kg	
Jo Melen	78kg	
Claire Scourfield	63kg	
Marianne Sharpe	70kg	
Angharad Sweet	over 78kg	

=== Lawn bowls ===
Men

Athlete	Events	Club
Richard Bowen	fours	Cardigan BC
Jason Greenslade	fours	Cardiff BC
Stephen Rees	pairs	Old Landorians BC
Ian Slade	fours	Pontymister BC
Will Thomas	pairs	Pontrhydyfen BC
Robert Weale	singles	Presteigne BC
Dai Wilkins	fours	Pontrhydyfen BC

Women

Athlete	Events	Club
Anwen Butten	pairs	Lampeter BC
Pam John	fours	Sophia Gardens BC
Gill Miles	fours	Sophia Gardens BC
Betty Morgan	singles	Llandrindod Wells BC
Nina Shipperlee	fours	Whitchurch BC
Ann Sutherland	fours	Croesyceiliog BC
Joanna Weale	pairs	Presteigne BC

=== Netball ===
Wales finished sixth in the netball at the 2002 Commonwealth Games. They lost to South Africa 71–27 in the 5th/6th playoff match.

Pool A

26 July 2002	Wales	48–47	Sri Lanka
15:00	Mair Jones 31; Jamilla Harris 13	Report	Sashika Samarasinghe 28; Gishanthi Jayakody 19

28 July 2002	England	81–18	Wales
20:30	Alex Astle 42/66 (64%); Abby Teare 39/48 (81%)	Report	Sian Edwards 8 Mair Jones 6 ?? 2

29 July 2002	Wales	49–42	Canada
15:00	Mair Jones 37/47 (79%); Sian Edwards 12	Report	Dulcina Wind 23; Maralyn Hope 19

30 July 2002	New Zealand	81–23	Wales
18:30	Donna Loffhagen 35/38 (92%); Belinda Colling 23; Daneka Wipiiti 23	Report	Mair Jones 9 Sian Edwards 7 Jamilla Harris 7

Table

Pos	Team	P	W	D	L	GF	GA	GD	Pts
1	New Zealand	4	4	0	0	365	101	+264	8
2	England	4	3	0	1	278	145	+133	6
3	Wales	4	2	0	2	138	251	-113	4
4	Canada	4	1	0	3	137	286	-149	2
5	Sri Lanka	4	0	0	4	156	291	-135	0

Qualified for Major semi-finals
Qualified for Minor Semi-finals
Qualified for 7th/10th classification

Minor semi-finals

31 July 2002	Jamaica	72–32	Wales
	Elaine Davis 42; Simone Forbes 19	Report	Mair Jones 24; Sian Edwards 5 Jamilla Harris 3

5th/6th playoff

2 August 2002	South Africa	71–27	Wales
15:00	Sindiswe Gumede 56; Adele Jonker 10; Martha Machoga 5		Jamilla Harris 17; Sian Edwards 8 Mair Jones 2

Squad

Wales roster
Players
Coaches

Name	Pos	DOB	Height	Club	Nat	Caps
Ceri Battle	WD, C		–	Glamorgan Valleys
Emma Blanks	GK, GD		–	South East Wales
Ursula Bowers	WD, GD, GK, C	29 June 1978 (aged 24)	1.81 m (5 ft 11 in)	Team Bath Force
Helen Case	WA, C		–	Afan Nedd Tawe
Dawn Donovan (vc)	GS, GA, WD, GD, GK		–	Glamorgan Valleys
Sian Edwards	GA, WA		–	South East Wales
Gemma Evans	C, WD		–	Cardiff & District
Joanna Griffiths (c)	WD, GD, C		–	Cardiff & District
Sara Hale	GK, GD, WD	7 October 1982 (aged 19)	1.76 m (5 ft 9 in)	UWIC
Jamilla Harris	GS, GA	27 August 1979 (aged 22)	1.88 m (6 ft 2 in)	Cardiff & District
Mair Jones	GS		–	Dyfed
Anna Mayes	WA, C	8 February 1981 (aged 21)	1.65 m (5 ft 5 in)	Team Bath Force

Head coach

- Raewyn Henry

Notes

- (c) – Captain
- (cc) – Co-captain
- (vc) – Vice-captain
- – Injury / maternity leave
- (TRP) – Temporary Replacement Player

=== Rugby sevens ===
Athlete	Events	Club
Gareth Baber	team	Pontypridd RFC
Jason Forster	team captain	Newport RFC
Gareth Gravell	team	Newport RFC
Rob Howley	team	London Wasps
Dafydd James	team	Bridgend RFC
Emyr Lewis	team	Pontypridd RFC
Dai Rees	team manager	n/a
Craig Richards	team	Bridgend RFC
Matthew Robinson	team	Swansea RFC
Arwel Thomas	team	Swansea RFC
Gareth Thomas	team	Bridgend RFC
Gareth Williams	team	Llanelli RFC
Gareth Wyatt	team	Pontypridd RFC
Colin Hillman	team coach	n/a

=== Shooting ===
Clay target

Athlete	Event	Qualification		Final	
Athlete	Event	Points	Rank	Points	Rank
Malcolm Allen	Skeet	71	7	Did not advance	
Desmond Davies	Skeet	67	15	Did not advance	
Malcolm Allen; Desmond Davies	Skeet pairs	—N/a		186	4
Mike Wixey	Trap	120	3 Q	140	4
James Birkett-Evans	Trap	114	12	Did not advance	
James Birkett-Evans; Mike Wixey	Trap pairs	—N/a		186	3rd place, bronze medalist(s)
Carolyn Trehearn	Double Trap	83	9	Did not advance	

Pistol

Cartridge pistol

Athlete	Event	Stage 1	Stage 2	Stage 3	Final	
Athlete	Event	Points	Points	Points	Points	Rank
Steve Pengelly	25 metre standard pistol	174	190	174	538	16

Air pistol

Athlete	Event	Qualification		Final	
Athlete	Event	Points	Rank	Points	Rank
Ian Harris	10 metre air pistol	561	14	Did not advance	
Robert Thomas	10 metre air pistol	543	27	Did not advance	
Ian Harris; Robert Thomas	10 metre air pistol pairs	—N/a		1114	11
Sian Megan Lewis	10 metre air pistol	367	12	Did not advance	
Julie Daltrey; Sian Megan Lewis	10 metre air pistol pairs	—N/a		347	8

Small bore and air rifle

Men

Athlete	Event	Qualification		Final	
Athlete	Event	Points	Rank	Points	Rank
John Croydon	10 m air rifle	584	7 Q	682.5	8
Martyn Blake	10 m air rifle	581	11	Did not advance	
Martyn Blake; John Croydon	10 m air rifle pairs	—N/a		1154	6
John Croydon	50 m rifle 3 positions	1141	7 Q	1230.9	8
Martyn Blake	50 m rifle 3 positions	1130	15	Did not advance	
John Croydon; Martyn Blake	50 m rifle 3 positions pairs	—N/a		2254	6
Robin Hilborne	50 m rifle prone	571	29	Did not advance	
David Phelps	50 m rifle prone	590	6 Q	693.5	6
Robin Hilborne; David Phelps	50 m rifle prone pairs	—N/a		1157	11

Women

Athlete	Event	Qualification		Final	
Athlete	Event	Points	Rank	Points	Rank
Julie Daltrey	10 m air rifle	383	14	Did not advance	
Rhian Floyd	10 m air rifle	380	18	Did not advance	
Julie Daltrey; Rhian Floyd	10 m air rifle pairs	—N/a		784	5
Johanne Brekke	50 m rifle prone	—N/a		586	5
Ceri Dallimore	50 m rifle prone	—N/a		584	7
Johanne Brekke; Ceri Dallimore	50 m rifle prone pairs	—N/a		1175	1st place, gold medalist(s)
Sian Corish	50 m rifle 3 positions	545	18	Did not advance	
Julie Daltry	50 m rifle 3 positions	560	Q	657.0	7
Sian Corish; Julie Daltrey	50 m rifle 3 positions pairs	—N/a		1113	5

Full bore

Open

Athlete	Event	Stage 1	Stage 2	Stage 3	Total	
Athlete	Event	Points	Points	Points	Points	Rank
David Davies	Individual	103-10v	148-19v	144-11v	395-40v	18
Gabrielle O'Lear	Individual	103-14v	149-17v	139-12v	391-43v	22
David Davies; Gabrielle O'Leary	Pairs	—N/a	295-38v	285-27v	580-65v	10

=== Squash ===
Men

Athlete	Events	Club
David Evans	singles, men's doubles	Maesteg
Scott Fitzgerald	singles, men's doubles	Lee-on-the-Solent
Alex Gough	singles, men's doubles	St. Mellons Cardiff
Gavin Jones	singles, men's doubles, mixed doubles	Maesteg

Women

Athlete	Events	Club
Karen Hargreaves	women's doubles, mixed doubles	West Lancashire SC
Katrina Hogan	women's doubles	St Mellons, Cardiff

=== Swimming ===
Men

Athlete	Events	Club
David Davies	200, 400, 1500m freestyle	
Steven Evans	50m, 100m freestyle	

Women

Athlete	Events	Club
Bethan Francis Coole	100m Backstroke, 100 butterfly, 200, 400 free, medley relay, 4x200	
Catrin Davies	50, 100, 200m Freestyle, medley relay, 4x200	
Karla Hancocks	50m free, 50m butterfly	
Georgia Elizabeth Holderness	50m, 100m Breaststroke, medley relay	
Mackenzie Howe	100, 200m Freestyle, 4x200	
Gemma Mary Howells	100 butterfly, 200, 400 medley, medley relay	
Holly James	400 freestyle	
Dawn Rebecca Jason	400, 800m freestyle, 4x200	
Julia Martin	50m, 100m Freestyle	
Lowri Tynan	50m, 100m Breaststroke	

=== Table tennis ===
Men

Athlete	Events	Club
Owen Griffiths	singles, doubles, mixed	
Ryan Jenkins	singles, doubles, mixed	
Stephen Jenkins	singles, doubles, mixed	
Adam Robertson	singles, doubles, mixed	

Women

Athlete	Events	Club
Bethan Daunton	singles, doubles, mixed	
Siwan Davies	singles, doubles, mixed	
Natasha Lake	singles, doubles, mixed	
Naomi Owen	singles, doubles, mixed	

=== Triathlon ===
Men

Athlete	Events	Club
David John Haines	individual	
Richard Llewwllyn Haines	individual	
Marc Jenkins	individual	

Women

Athlete	Events	Club
Leanda Cave	individual	
Anneliese Heard	individual	

=== Weightlifting ===
Men

Athlete	Events	Club
Andy Goswell	85kg	
Andy Joy	94kg	
Anthony Morgan	77kg	
Dave Morgan	77kg	
Terry Perdue	+105kg	
Arfon Roberts	69kg	
Ray Vaughan	85kg	
Raymond Williams	69kg	

Women

Athlete	Events	Club
Michaela Breeze	58kg	
Non Evans	63kg	
Mary Hancock	48kg	
Kate Louise Howard	48kg	

== See also ==
- Wales at the Commonwealth Games
