= British Judo Championships =

Annual British Judo Championship

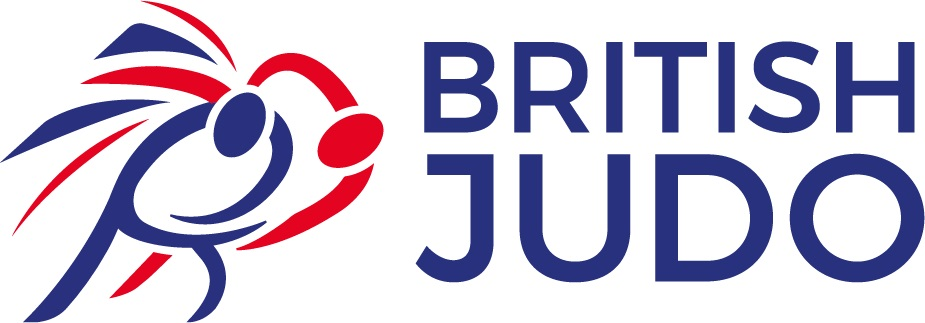

Competition details
- Discipline: Judo
- Type: Annual
- Organiser: British Judo
- Next edition: 2026 (December tba)

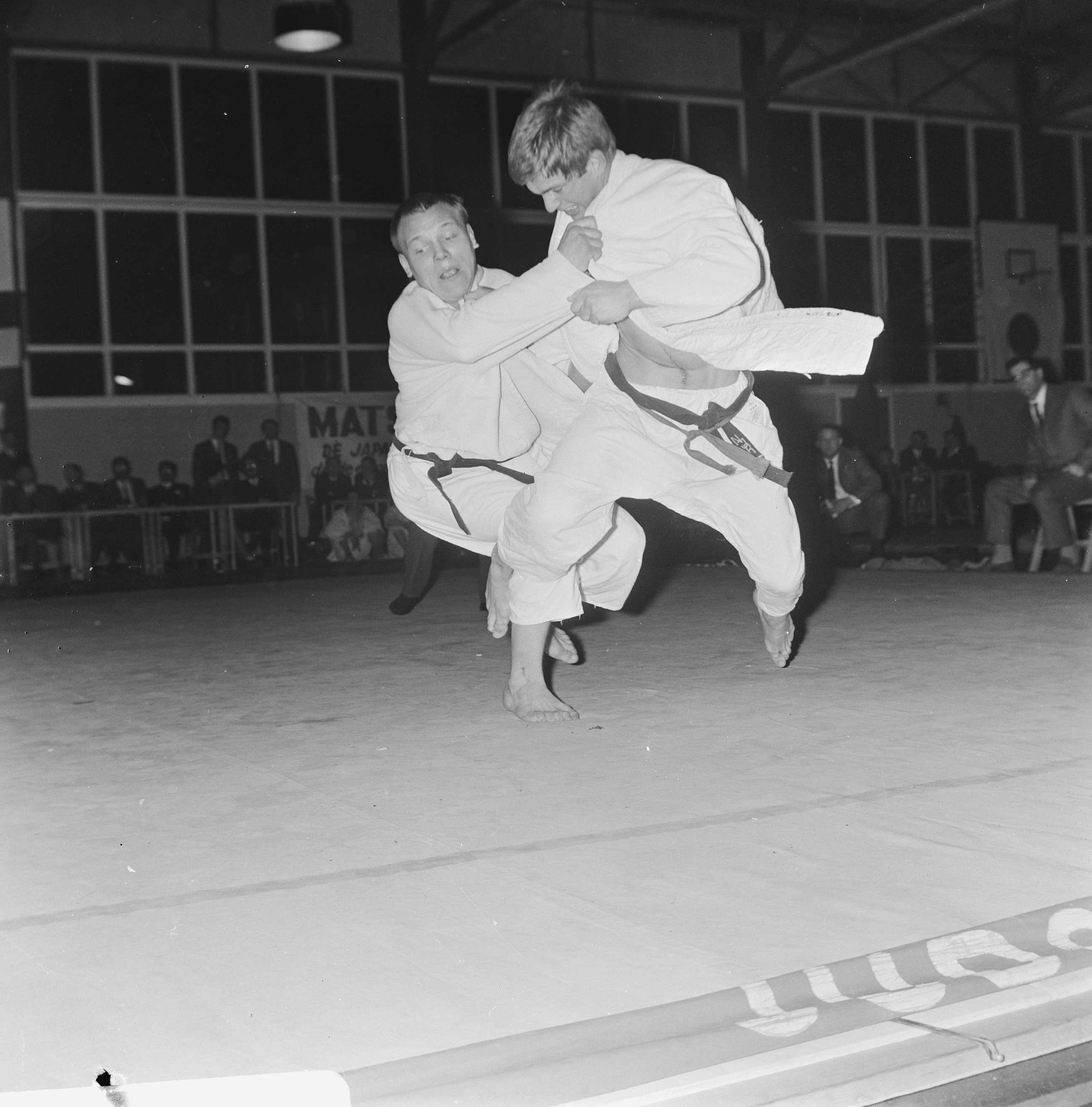
Brian Jacks on the left was British middleweight champion in 1974 and 1975

The British Judo Championships are held annually and feature various age and weight categories to determine the British champion. The Championships are currently held at the English Institute of Sport, Sheffield.

Until 2013, the Championships were held under the title of either the British Closed Championships or the British Senior Trials. In 2013, the British Closed Championships/Senior Trials were merged with the all-age British Championships. The 2020 Championship was cancelled due to the COVID-19 pandemic.

== Past winners ==
=== Men's extra lightweight -60kg ===
Year	Winner
Bantamweight -60kg
1976	Andrew Hough
1977	Sid Parker
1978	9-10 Dec
1979	Jeremy Marcroft
1980	Gavin Bell
1981	Peter Middleton
1982	John Swatman
1983	Fred Bradley
1984	Michael Somerville
1985	Mark Preston
1986	Owen Lowery
1987	Carl Finney
1988	Carl Finney
1989	Carl Finney
1990	John Newton
1991	John Newton
1992	Nigel Donohue
1993	Jamie Johnson
1994	Jamie Johnson

Year	Winner
1995	John Buchanan
1996	Sam Dunkley
Extra Lightweight -60kg
1997	Jamie Johnson
1998	John Buchanan
1999	Jamie Johnson
2000	Jamie Johnson
2001	John Buchanan
2002	Craig Fallon
2003	John Buchanan
2004	Gavin Davies
2005	Brett Caswell
2006	Gavin Davies
2007	James Millar
2008	James Millar
2011	James Millar
2012	Brandon Dodge
2013	Ashley McKenzie
2014	Ashley McKenzie
2015	Peter Miles

Year	Winner
2016	Renz Vallejera
2017	Sam Hall
2018	Josh Giles
2019	Sam Hall
2021	Sam Hall
2022	Neil MacDonald
2023	Dylan Munro
2024	Charlie Ayre
2025	Benjamin Caldwell

=== Men's half lightweight -66kg ===
Year	Winner
Featherweight -65kg
1976	Raymond Neenan
1977	Seth Birch
1978	9-10 Dec
1979	Kerrith Brown
1980	Kerrith Brown
1981	Stephen Gawthorpe
1982	Kerrith Brown
1983	Colin Savage
1984	Howard Clark-Melville
1985	Michael Bowmer
1986	Michael Bowmer
1987	Mark Adshead
1988	Mark Preston
1989	Owen Pinnock
1990	Owen Pinnock
1991	Mark Preston
1992	Ian Freeman
1993	Simon Moss

Year	Winner
1994	Simon Moss
1995	Jean-Paul Bell
1996	Simon Moss
Half Lightweight -66kg
1997	Simon Moss
1998	David Sommerville
1999	James Warren
2000	James Warren
2001	Dominic King
2002	David Sommerville
2003	James Warren
2004	Alan Scott
2005	Gareth Carder
2006	Jean-Rene Badrick
2007	Colin Oates
2008	Craig Fallon
2011	Craig Fallon
2012	Colin Oates
2013	Colin Oates

Year	Winner
2014	Colin Oates
2015	Lewis Keeble
2016	Sam Hall
2017	Peter Miles
2018	Gregg Varey
2019	Neil MacDonald
2021	Gregg Varey
2022	Michael Fryer
2023	Neil MacDonald
2024	Michael Fryer
2025	Peter Miles

=== Men's lightweight -73kg ===
Year	Winner
Lightweight -63kg
1974	Keith Cannaby
1975	Raymond Neenan
Lightweight -71kg
1976	Neil Adams
1977	Hugh Syme
1978	9-10 Dec
1979	Peter Blewitt
1980	Tom Wynter
1981	Fitzroy Davies
1982	Fitzloyd Walker
1983	Kerrith Brown
1984	Paul Sheals
1985	Roy Stone
1986	Stephen Ravenscroft
1987	Kerrith Brown
1988	Billy Cusack
1989	Stephen Ravenscroft
1990	Billy Cusack

Year	Winner
1991	Billy Cusack
1992	Billy Cusack
1993	Danny Kingston
1994	Billy Cusack
1995	Paul Leishman
1996	Lee Burbridge
Lightweight -73kg
1997	Anthony Johnson
1998	Eric Bonti
1999	Eric Bonti
2000	Darren Warner
2001	Daniel Hawkins
2002	Matthew Purssey
2003	Eric Bonti
2004	Matthew Purssey
2005	Matthew Purssey
2006	Iain Feenan
2007	Iain Feenan
2008	Alex Farbon

Year	Winner
2011	Danny Williams
2012	Jan Gosiewski
2013	Jan Gosiewski
2014	Jan Gosiewski
2015	Patrick Dawson
2016	Connor Ireland
2017	Daniel Powell
2018	Eric Ham
2019	Daniel Powell
2021	Daniel Powell
2022	Luke Davies
2023	Eric Ham
2024	Ethan Nairne
2025	Benjamin Levy

=== Men's half middleweight -81kg ===
Year	Winner
Light Middleweight -70kg
1974	Vacinuff Morrison
1975	Vacinuff Morrison
Light Middleweight -78kg
1976	Vacinuff Morrison
1977	William Ward
1978	9-10 Dec
1979	Christopher Bowles
1980	Densign White
1981	Kevin Lynch
1982	Densign White
1983	Martin McSorley
1984	Martin McSorley
1985	Gordon Lambert
1986	Paul Ajala
1987	Martin McSorley
1988	Neil Adams
1989	Fitzroy Davies
1990	Kerrith Brown
1991	Ryan Birch

Year	Winner
1992	Martin McSorley
1993	Billy Cusack
1994	Darren Warner
1995	Chris Johnson
1996	Neil Edwards
Half middleweight -81kg
1997	Luke Preston
1998	Graeme Randall
1999	Luke Preston
2000	Luke Preston
2001	Graeme Randall
2002	Euan Burton
2003	Euan Burton
2004	Thomas Cousins
2005	Thomas Davis
2006	Matthew Purssey
2007	Tom Reed
2008	Matthew Purssey
2011	Thomas Davis
2012	Tom Reed

Year	Winner
2013	Owen Livesey
2014	Owen Livesey
2015	Sebastian Green
2016	Colin Oates
2017	Owen Livesey
2018	Spencer Lambert
2019	Stuart McWatt
2021	Lachlan Moorhead
2022	Del Imrie
2023	Scott Cusack
2024	Rory Tyrrell
2025	Lachlan Moorhead

=== Men's middleweight -90kg ===
Year	Winner
Middleweight -80kg
1974	Brian Jacks
1975	Brian Jacks
Middleweight -86kg
1976	Robert Dibelius
1977	Mark Chittenden
1978	9-10 Dec
1979	Joe Donald
1980	Ronald Knight
1981	Densign White
1982	Stuart Travis
1983	Densign White
1984	Raymond Stevens
1985	Densign White
1986	Raymond Stevens
1987	Densign White
1988	Densign White
1989	Densign White
1990	Stephen Cross
1991	Densign White

Year	Winner
1992	Lloyd Alexander
1993	Fitzroy Davies
1994	Wayne Lakin
1995	Gary Edwards
1996	Winston Gordon
Middleweight -90kg
1997	Sam Delahay
1998	Ryan Birch
1999	Peter Cousins
2000	Winston Gordon
2001	Peter Cousins
2002	Peter Cousins
2003	Peter Cousins
2004	Steven Vidler
2005	Peter Cousins
2006	Peter Lomax
2007	James Austin
2008	Jonathan Purssey
2011	Matthew Purssey
2012	Euan Burton

Year	Winner
2013	David Groom
2014	Gary Hall
2015	Gary Hall
2016	Max Stewart
2017	Jamal Petgrave
2018	Frazer Chamberlain
2019	Jamal Petgrave
2021	Jamal Petgrave
2022	Adam Hoshal
2023	Stuart McWatt
2024	Jamal Petgrave
2025	Scott Cusack

=== Men's half heavyweight -100kg ===
Year	Winner
Heavyweight -93kg
1974	Angelo Parisi
1975	Robert Bradley
Light Heavyweight -95kg
1976	Paul Radburn
1977	Alex Ives
1978	9-10 Dec
1979	Nicholas Kokotaylo
1980	Dennis Stewart
1981	Dennis Stewart
1982	Dennis Stewart
1983	Dennis Stewart
1984	Stuart Travis
1985	William Ward
1986	Nicholas Kokotaylo
1987	Nick Gale
1988	Nicholas Kokotaylo
1989	Nicholas Kokotaylo
1990	Nicholas Kokotaylo

Year	Winner
1991	Nicholas Kokotaylo
1992	Lionel Hibbert
1993	Lloyd Alexander
1994	Chris Bacon
1995	Keith Davis
1996	Keith Davis
Half heavyweight -100kg
1997	Daley Lasebikin
1998	Keith Davis
1999	Keith Davis
2000	Keith Davis
2001	Sam Delahay
2002	Sam Delahay
2003	Brett Embley
2004	Brett Embley
2005	Winston Gordon
2006	Philip Nutter
2007	Andrew Burns
2008	Peter Cousins

Year	Winner
2011	James Austin
2012	Peter Cousins
2013	Benjamin Fletcher
2014	Benjamin Fletcher
2015	Philip Awiti-Alcaraz
2016	Benjamin Fletcher
2017	Adam Hall
2018	Rhys Thompson
2019	Cailin Calder
2021	Rhys Thompson
2022	Rhys Thompson
2023	Harry Lovell-Hewitt
2024	Rhys Thompson
2025	Oliver Barratt

=== Men's heavyweight +100kg ===
Year	Winner
Heavyweight +93kg
1974	Angelo Parisi
1975	Robert Bradley
Heavyweight +95kg
1976	Errol Carnegie
1977	Martin Clarke
1978	9-10 Dec
1979	Robert Bradley
1980	Robert Bradley
1981	Elvis Gordon
1982	Errol Carnegie
1983	Elvis Gordon
1984	Elvis Gordon
1985	Elvis Gordon
1986	Mervyn Bowditch
1987	Elvis Gordon
1988	Ian King
1989	Elvis Gordon
1990	James Webb

Year	Winner
1991	Elvis Gordon
1992	Andrew Costello
1993	William Etherington
1994	Nicholas Kokotaylo
1995	Nicholas Kokotaylo
1996	Richard Blanes
Heavyweight +100kg
1997	Richard Blanes
1998	Richard Blanes
1999	Daniel Sargent
2000	Daniel Sargent
2001	Daniel Sargent
2002	Daniel Sargent
2003	Andrew Ede
2004	Scott Burlinson
2005	Chris Sherrington
2006	Joe Delahay
2007	Matt Clempner
2008	Chris Sherrington

Year	Winner
2011	Matt Clempner
2012	Matt Clempner
2013	Chris Sherrington
2014	Theodore Spalding-McIntosh
2015	James Austin
2016	Neil Schofield
2017	Andrew Melbourne
2018	Adam Hall
2019	Chris Sherrington
2021	Wesley Greenidge
2022	Wesley Greenidge
2023	Andrew McWatt
2024	Wesley Greenidge
2025	Joshua Whitehouse

=== Men's open (any weight, discontinued) ===
Year	Winner
1979	Stuart Travis
1981	Arthur Mapp

Year	Winner
1984	David Walker
1985	Elvis Gordon

=== Women's extra lightweight -48kg ===
Year	Winner
Bantamweight -48kg
1977	Jane Bridge
1978	
1979	Carol Brooks
1981	Karen Briggs
1982	Jane Bridge
1983	Karen Briggs
1984	Karen Briggs
1985	Jane Jones
1986	Anisah Mohamoodally
1987	Anisah Mohamoodally
1988	Anisah Mohamoodally
1989	Anisah Mohamoodally
1990	Erica Bowley
1991	Karen Briggs
1992	Joyce Heron
1993	Joyce Heron

Year	Winner
1994	Joyce Heron
1995	Kim Dunkley
1996	Joyce Heron
Extra Lightweight -48kg
1997	Victoria Dunn
1998	Joyce Heron
1999	Donna Robertson
2000	Donna Robertson
2001	Fiona Robertson
2002	Donna Robertson
2003	Fiona Robertson
2004	Donna Robertson
2005	Donna Robertson
2006	Fiona Robertson
2007	Kelly Edwards
2008	Francesca Steggall
2011	Kelly Edwards

Year	Winner
2012	Hayley Willis
2013	Hayley Willis
2014	Kelly Staddon
2015	Kimberley Renicks
2016	Kelly Staddon
2017	Kimberley Renicks
2018	Kimberley Renicks
2019	Kimberley Renicks
2021	Amy Platten
2022	Summer Shaw
2023	Summer Shaw
2024	Summer Shaw
2025	Summer Shaw

=== Women's half lightweight -52kg ===
Year	Winner
Featherweight -52kg
1977	Connie Armstrong
1978	Loretta Doyle
1979	Loretta Doyle
1981	Loretta Doyle
1982	Loretta Doyle
1983	Loretta Doyle
1984	Loretta Doyle
1985	Sharon Rendle
1986	Sharon Rendle
1987	Sharon Rendle
1988	Loretta Doyle
1989	Sharon Tedder
1990	Elise Summers
1991	Sharon Rendle
1992	Elise Summers
1993	Deborah Allan
1994	Deborah Allan

Year	Winner
1995	Deborah Allan
1996	Elise Summers
Half lightweight -52kg
1997	Elise Summers
1998	Georgina Singleton
1999	Elise Summers
2000	Georgina Singleton
2001	Georgina Singleton
2002	Victoria Dunn
2003	Victoria Dunn
2004	Georgina Singleton
2005	Jodie Carter
2006	Kirstene Feenan
2007	Sophie Johnstone
2008	Sophie Johnstone
2011	Sophie Cox
2012	Sophie Cox
2013	Kelly Edwards

Year	Winner
2014	Chelsie Giles
2015	Chelsie Giles
2016	Kelly Edwards
2017	Chelsie Giles
2018	Lanina Solley
2019	Yasmin Javadian
2021	Chloe Robyns-Landricombe
2022	Tatum Keen
2023	Caitlin Barber
2024	Tatum Keen
2025	Lola Hodson

=== Women's lightweight -57kg ===
Year	Winner
Featherweight -56kg
1977	Nicole Coleman
1978	Dawn Netherwood
1979	Winn Bolton
1981	Bridgette McCarthy
1982	Diane Bell
1983	Diane Bell
1984	Debbie Rogers
1985	Janice Turner
1986	Loretta Doyle
1987	Tracey Lee
1988	Janice Turner
1989	Nicola Fairbrother
1990	Nathalie Evans
1991	Nicola Fairbrother
1992	Nicola Fairbrother
1993	Cheryle Peel
1994	Cheryle Peel

Year	Winner
1995	Ceri Richards
1996	Natalie Barry
Lightweight -57kg
1997	
1998	Nicola Fairbrother
1999	Nicola Fairbrother
2000	Natalie Barry
2001	Sophie Cox
2002	Sophie Cox
2003	Natalie Barry
2004	Sophie Cox
2005	Sophie Cox
2006	Gemma Howell
2007	Gemma Howell
2008	Gemma Howell
2011	Gemma Howell
2012	Connie Ramsay
2013	Nekoda Davis

Year	Winner
2014	Nekoda Davis
2015	Laure Fournier
2016	Acelya Toprak
2017	Acelya Toprak
2018	Malin Wilson
2019	Josie Steele
2021	Acelya Toprak
2022	Malin Wilson
2023	Lele Nairne
2024	Chloe Link
2025	Acelya Toprak

=== Women's half middleweight -61kg ===
Year	Winner
Light Middleweight -61kg
1977	Valerie Beckum
1978	
1979	Julie Cross
1980	Dawn Netherwood
1981	Jane Seymour
1982	Ann Hughes
1983	Ann Hughes
1984	Mel Tapp
1985	Debbie Rogers
1986	Teresa Quoi
1987	Janice Turner
1988	Tracey Lee
1989	L Hancock
1990	Melody Johnson
1991	Melody Johnson
1992	Diane Bell
1993	Kirstie Weir
1994	Diane Bell

Year	Winner
1995	Cheryle Peel
1996	Ruth Eddy
1997	Rosemary Felton
1998	Gemma Hutchins
Half Middleweight -63kg
1999	Gemma Hutchins
2000	Sarah Clark
2001	Sarah Clark
2002	Karen Roberts
2003	Karen Roberts
2004	Rosemary Felton
2005	Sarah Clark
2006	Sarah Clark
2007	Kate Walker
2008	Sarah Clark
2011	Sarah Clark
2012	Sarah Clark
2013	Gemma Howell

Year	Winner
2014	Alice Schlesinger
2015	Lucy Renshall
2016	Lucy Renshall
2017	Lucy Renshall
2018	Amy Livesey
2019	Bekky Livesey
2021	Lucy Renshall
2022	Ammi Takahashi
2023	Katie Mills
2024	Lucy Renshall
2025	Ammi Takahashi

=== Women's middleweight -70kg ===
Year	Winner
Middleweight -66kg
1977	Maureen Bennett
1978	Maureen Bennett
1979	Maureen Bennett
1981	Lisa Jones
1982	Dawn Netherwood
1983	Dawn Netherwood
1984	Margaret Jones
1985	Dawn Netherwood
1986	Eileen Boyle
1987	Eileen Boyle
1988	Rowena Sweatman
1989	Kate Howey
1990	Polly Robinson
1991	Sharon Mills
1992	Chloe Cowen
1993	Chloe Cowen
1994	Chloe Cowen

Year	Winner
1995	Karen Powell
1996	Karen Powell
Middleweight -70kg
1997	Karen Powell
1998	Kate Howey
1999	Amanda Sneddon
2000	Rachel Wilding
2001	Amanda Costello
2002	Kate Howey
2003	Michelle Holt
2004	Sally Conway
2005	Michelle Holt
2006	Sally Conway
2007	Sally Conway
2008	Michelle Holt
2011	Sally Conway
2012	Sally Conway
2013	Sally Conway

Year	Winner
2014	Sally Conway
2015	Megan Fletcher
2016	Katie-Jemima Yeats-Brown
2017	Katie-Jemima Yeats-Brown
2018	Kelly Petersen Pollard
2019	Kelly Petersen Pollard
2021	Kelly Petersen Pollard
2022	Simone Cross
2023	Simone Cross
2024	Kelly Petersen Pollard
2025	Kelly Petersen Pollard

=== Women's half heavyweight -78kg ===
Year	Winner
Light Heavyweight -72kg
1977	Geraldine Harmon
1978	Geraldine Harmon
1979	Sandra Bradshaw
1981	Avril Malley
1982	Theresa Hayden
1983	Theresa Hayden
1984	Avril Malley
1985	Kerry Finney
1986	Avril Malley
1987	Theresa Hayden
1988	Avril Bray
1989	Anne Lucitt
1990	Josie Horton
1991	Kate Howey
1992	Kate Howey
1993	Kate Howey
1994	Stacey Smith

Year	Winner
1995	Jo Hayward-Melen
1996	Joanna Melen
Half Heavyweight -78kg
1997	Rowena Sweatman
1998	Chloe Cowen
1999	Chloe Cowen
2000	Michelle Rogers
2001	Joanna Melen
2002	Rachel Wilding
2003	Michelle Rogers
2004	Rachel Wilding
2005	Michelle Rogers
2006	Michelle Rogers
2007	Emma Fletcher
2008	Lindsay Purves
2011	Louise Little
2012	Natalie Powell
2013	Natalie Powell

Year	Winner
2014	Natalie Powell
2015	Emma Reid
2016	Natalie Powell
2017	Shelley Ludford
2018	Katie-Jemima Yeats-Brown
2019	Shelley Ludford
2021	Emma Reid
2022	Shelley Ludford
2023	Emma Reid
2024	Emma Reid
2025	Emma Reid

=== Women's heavyweight +78kg ===
Year	Winner
Heavyweight +72kg
1977	Ellen Cobb
1978	
1979	Heather Ford
1981	Heather Ford
1982	Avril Malley
1983	Ruth Vondy
1984	Sandra Bradshaw
1985	Sandra Bradshaw
1986	Sandra Bradshaw
1987	Joanne Spinks
1988	Nicola Wallis
1989	
1990	Mandy Bell
1991	Kerry Knowles
1992	Lisa Maddaford
1993	Michelle Rogers
1994	Jane Morris

Year	Winner
1995	Jane Morris
1996	Simone Callender
Heavyweight +78kg
1997	Simone Callender
1998	Simone Callender
1999	Michelle Rogers
2000	Simone Callender
2001	Simone Callender
2002	Karina Bryant
2003	Simone Callender
2004	Michelle Rogers
2005	Abbie Cunningham
2006	Simone Callender
2007	Sarah Adlington
2008	Sarah Adlington
2011	Karina Bryant
2012	Sarah Adlington
2013	Sarah Adlington

Year	Winner
2014	Sarah Adlington
2015	Michelle Boyle
2016	Michelle Boyle
2017	Sarah Hawkes
2018	Emily Ritchie
2019	Emily Ritchie
2021	Sarah Adlington
2022	Christi-Rose Pretorius
2023	Sarah Adlington
2024	Sarah Adlington
2025	Chloe Nunn

=== Women's open (any weight, discontinued) ===
Year	Winner
1979	Lynn Tilley
1981	Avril Malley
1982	Avril Malley
1983	Avril Malley

Year	Winner
1984	Ann Hughes
1985	Avril Malley

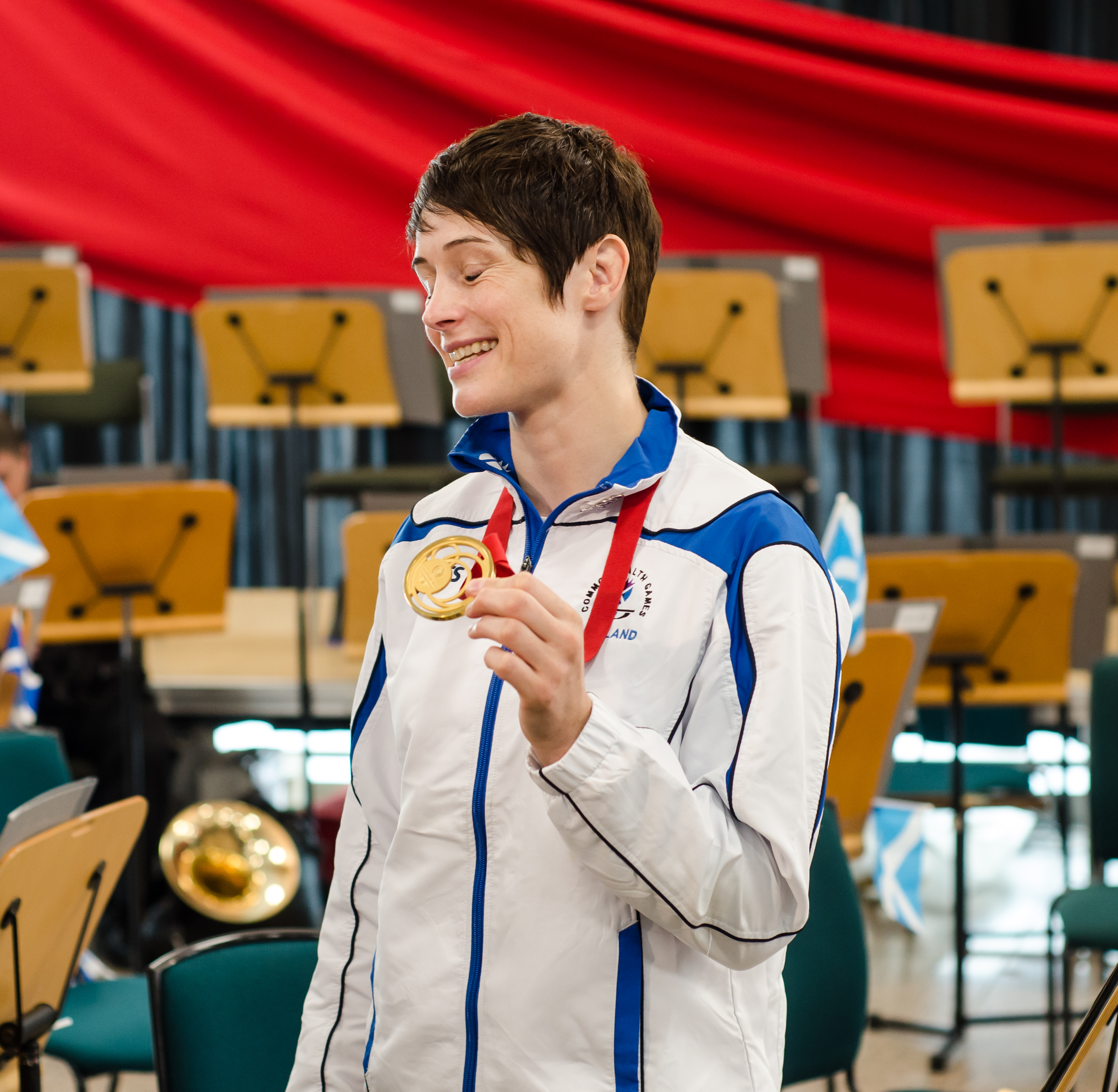
Sarah Clark, 7-times half-middleweight champion
