= Timothy Davies =

Timothy Davies may refer to:

- Timothy Davies (politician) (1857–1951), British Liberal Member of Parliament
- Timothy Davies (judoka) (born 1980), British judoka
- Timothy Davies (runner), British runner

== See also ==
- Timothy Davis (disambiguation)
- Tim Davis (disambiguation)
