= Steven Vidler =

Steven Vidler may refer to:

- Steven Vidler (actor) (born 1960), Australian actor
- Steven Vidler (judoka) (born 1977), Scottish judoka
