= Narelle Hill =

Australian judoka

Personal information
- Full name: Narelle Mary Hill
- Born: 27 October 1969 (age 56) Canberra, Australian Capital Territory, Australia
- Occupation: Judoka

Sport
- Country: Australia
- Sport: Judo
- Club: Marist Judo Club; Hill Sports Academy
Medal record
Judo
Representing Australia
Commonwealth Games
| Bronze medal – third place | 1990 Auckland | Middleweight |

Profile at external databases
- JudoInside.com: 3198

Narelle Mary Hill (born 1969) is a member of the Hill family who competed in Judo at the 1996 Summer Olympics – Women's 56 kg for Australia. She had previously won a bronze medal in judo for Australia at the 1990 Commonwealth Games.

== See also ==
- Hill family
- List of Commonwealth Games medallists in judo
