= Timothy Davis =

Timothy Davis may refer to:

- Timothy Davis (activist) (born 1955), politician, cannabis rights activist from Missouri
- Timothy Davis (Iowa politician) (1794–1862), U.S. Representative from Iowa
- Timothy Davis (Massachusetts politician) (1821–1888), U.S. Representative from Massachusetts

== See also ==
- Tim Davis (disambiguation)
- Timothy Davis-Reed, U.S. actor
- Timothy Davies (disambiguation)
