= James Austin (judoka) =

British judoka (born 1983)

Personal information
- Nationality: British
- Born: 5 April 1983 (age 41); Lichfield, England
- Occupation: Judoka

Sport
- Sport: Judo
- Weight class: -90 kg, -100kg, +100kg

Profile at external databases
- JudoInside.com: 12897

James Austin (born 5 April 1983 in Lichfield, England) is an English judoka, who competed at the 2012 Summer Olympics.

== Judo career ==
Austin came to prominence after becoming champion of Great Britain, winning the middleweight division at the British Judo Championships in 2007. Four years later in 2011, he won a second British title but at the heavier weight of half heavyweight.

In 2012, he was selected by Great Britain for the 2012 Summer Olympics in the -100 kg event, where he lost in his first round match.

After the 2012 Olympic Games he won the 2012 World Cup in Minsk, the 2013 European Cup and the 2014 Scottish Open, as well as finishing in 3rd place in the 2013 Pan American Open. He also won a third British title at a third different weight, this time the 2015 heavyweight category.
