= Juan José Paz =

Bolivian judoka (born 1980)

Personal information
- Full name: Juan José Paz
- Nationality: Bolivia
- Born: 24 September 1980 (age 45) Santa Cruz de la Sierra, Bolivia
- Height: 1.68 m (5 ft 6 in)
- Weight: 66 kg (146 lb)

Sport
- Sport: Judo
- Event: 66 kg

Juan José Paz (born September 24, 1980 in Santa Cruz de la Sierra) is a Bolivian judoka, who competed in the men's half-lightweight category. Paz qualified as a lone judoka for the Bolivian squad in the men's half-lightweight class (66 kg) at the 2004 Summer Olympics in Athens, by granting a tripartite invitation from the International Judo Federation. He conceded his opening match with a single shido penalty and succumbed to a single leg takedown (kuchiki taoshi) and a 1–0 score on waza-ari from Australia's Heath Young after five minutes of regulation.
