= David Somerville (judoka) =

Scottish judoka (born 1974)

Personal information
- Nationality: British (Scottish)
- Born: 9 May 1974 (age 52) Glasgow, Scotland
- Occupation: Judoka
- Height: 163 cm (5 ft 4 in)
- Weight: 66 kg (146 lb)

Sport
- Sport: Judo
- Weight class: –65 kg
- Club: Edinburgh Judo Club
Medal record
Representing Scotland
Commonwealth Games
Silver medal – second place	2002 Manchester	66 kg

Profile at external databases
- JudoInside.com: 3402

David Taylor Somerville (born 9 May 1974) is a former judoka. He represented Great Britain at the 2000 Summer Olympics in Sydney and Scotland at the Commonwealth Games.

== Judo career ==
Somerville is a two time champion of Great Britain, winning the British Judo Championships in 1998 and 2002.

He represented the 2002 Scottish team at the 2002 Commonwealth Games in Manchester, England, where he competed in the 66 kg category and won a silver medal after defeating Emmanuel Kojo Nartey of Ghana, Heath Young of Australia before losing the gold medal bout to James Warren of England.

At the 2000 Olympic Games, Somerville competed in the men's 66 kg half-lightweight category.

=== Other achievements ===
Year	Tournament	Place	Weight class
1998	European Judo Championships	5th	Half lightweight (66 kg)
1999	European Judo Championships	7th	Half lightweight (66 kg)
2002	Commonwealth Games	2nd	Half lightweight (66 kg)
