= Scotland at the 2002 Commonwealth Games =

- CG code: SCO
- CGA: Commonwealth Games Scotland
- Website: www.teamscotland.scot

in Manchester, England
- Competitors: 207
- Flag bearers: Opening: Craig MacLean; Closing: Alison Sheppard
- Officials: 85
- Medals Ranked 10th: Gold 6 Silver 8 Bronze 16 Total 30

Commonwealth Games appearances (overview)
- 1930; 1934; 1938; 1950; 1954; 1958; 1962; 1966; 1970; 1974; 1978; 1982; 1986; 1990; 1994; 1998; 2002; 2006; 2010; 2014; 2018; 2022; 2026; 2030

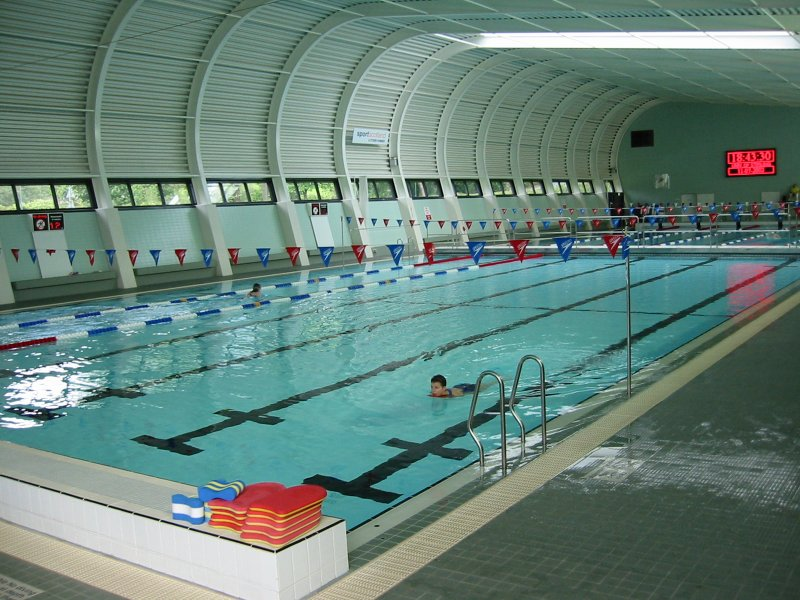
This pool was used for training by the Scottish team for the 2002 games

Scotland competed at the 2002 Commonwealth Games in Manchester, England, from 25 July to 4 August 2002.

Scotland sent a team of 207 athletes and 85 officials.

Scotland came 10th overall with 6 gold, 8 silver and 15 bronze medals.

== Medallists ==
=== Gold ===
- Steve Frew (gymnastics)
- Chris Hoy (cycling)
- Graeme Randall (judo)
- Alison Sheppard (swimming)
- Men's pairs (lawn bowls)
- Men's triples EAD (lawn bowls)

=== Silver ===
- Jenni Brien (judo)
- Sarah Clark (judo)
- Lee McConnell (athletics)
- Graeme Smith (swimming)
- David Somerville (judo)
- Gregor Tait (swimming)
- Mike Thomson (shooting)
- Women's 50m rifle prone pairs (shooting)

=== Bronze ===
- Edith Barnes (shooting)
- Barry Collie (gymnastics)
- Amanda Costello (judo)
- Karen Cusack (judo)
- Stephanie Hart (judo)
- Craig McEwan (boxing)
- Lee McGrorty (judo)
- Jamie Quarry (athletics)
- Fiona Robertson (judo)
- Alison Sheppard (swimming)
- Graeme Smith (swimming)
- Steven Vidler (judo)
- Andrew Young (boxing)
- Thomas Yule (weightlifting)
- Mixed team (badminton)
- Team sprint (cycling)

== Team Scotland ==
=== Athletics ===
Men

Athlete	Events	Club	Medals
Chris Baillie	110m hurdles		
Jonathan McCallum	1500m, 5000m		
Richard McDonald	400m hurdles		
Iain Park	hammer throw		
Simon Pride	marathon		
Jamie Quarry	decathlon		Bronze medal
Darren Ritchie	long jump		
Glen Stewart	10,000m		

Women

Athlete	Events	Club	Medals
Susan Burnside	4 × 400 m relay		
Sara Cattermole	20 km walk		
Sinead Dudgeon	400m hurdles, 4 × 400 m relay		
Carey Anne Easton	400m, 4 × 400 m relay		
Allison Higgins	10,000m		
Lee McConnell	400m, 4 × 400 m relay		Silver medal
Gemma Nicol	4 × 400 m relay		
Hayley Ovens	1500m		
Gillian Palmer	5000, 10,000m		
Susan Scott	800, 1500m		

=== Badminton ===
Men

Athlete	Events	Club	Medals
Bruce Flockhart	singles, team	Dunfermline	Bronze medal
Alastair Gatt	doubles, team	Edinburgh	Bronze medal
Russell Hogg	doubles, mixed, team	Dunfermline	Bronze medal
Craig Robertson	doubles, mixed, team	Fauldhouse	Bronze medal
Graeme Smith	singles, doubles, mixed, team	Glasgow	Bronze medal
Graham Simpson	singles, team	Dumfries	Bronze medal

Women

Athlete	Events	Club	Medals
Susan Hughes	singles, team	Glasgow	Bronze medal
Kirsteen McEwan	doubles, mixed, team	Bridge of Weir	Bronze medal
Elinor Middlemiss	doubles, mixed	Edinburgh	Bronze medal
Fiona Sneddon	singles, team	Lochgelly	Bronze medal
Sandra Watt	team, doubles, team	Innerleithen	Bronze medal
Yuan Wemyss	team, doubles, team	Dumfries	Bronze medal

=== Boxing ===
Athlete	Events	Club	Medals
Kevin Anderson	63.5 kg light-welterweight	Denbeath ABC, Leven	
Mark Hastie	60 kg lightweight	Forgewood ABC, Motherwell	
Craig McEwan	71 kg light-middleweight	Clovenstone ABC, Edinburgh	Bronze medal
Steven McGuire	75 kg middleweight	Glenrothes ABC, Fife	
Colin McNeil	67 kg welterweight	Fauldhouse ABC	
Ian Millarvie	+91 kg super-heavyweight	Phoenix ABC, Paisley	
Lee Ramsay	81 kg light-heavyweight	Kingdom ABC, Kikcaldy	
Andrew Young	91 kg heavyweight	City of Inverness ABC	Bronze medal

=== Cycling ===
Men

Athlete	Events	Club	Medals
Russell Anderson	pursuit, team pursuit		
Richard Chapman	points, scratch, team pursuit		
Ross Edgar	Sprint, team sprint		Bronze medal
Chris Hoy	1 km time trial, team sprint		,
Marco Librizzi	Sprint, team sprint		
Craig MacLean	Sprint, team sprint		Bronze medal
James McCallum	points, team pursuit		
Jason MacIntyre	road race, time trial		
Ross Muir	road race, points, scratch, team pursuit		
Michael Pooley	pursuit, team pursuit		
Duncan Urquhart	road race, time trial		

Women

Athlete	Events	Club	Medals
Caroline Alexander	road race, mountain bike		
Sally Ashbridge	road race, time trial		
Jo Cavill	road race, points		
Caroline Cook	road race, time trial		
Katrina Hair	road race, time trial		

=== Gymnastics ===
Men

Athlete	Events	Club	Medals
Barry Collie	all-around, horizontal, parallel, vault		Bronze medal
Adam Cox	horizontal		
Steve Frew	all-around, rings		
Jon Mutch	all-around		

Women

Athlete	Events	Club	Medals
Gayle Campbell	all-around, floor		
Lynne Donaghy	all-around		
Helen Galashan	all-around, beam, bars		

=== Hockey ===
Women

Athlete	Events	Club	Medals
Jane Burley	team		
Linda Clement	team		
Susan Gilmour	team		
Louise Gordon	team		
Alison Grant	team		
Kathryn Gray	team		
Samantha Judge	team		
Claire Lampard	team		
Audrey Longmuir	team		
Susan MacDonald	team		
Debbie McLeod	team		
Tracey Robb	team		
Emma Rochlin	team		
Rhona Simpson	team		
Valery Thomson	team		
Helen Walker	team		

=== Judo ===
Men

Athlete	Events	Medals
Thomas Allan	100 kg	
John Buchanan	60 kg	
Gary Edwards	+100 kg	
Lee McGrorty	73 kg	Bronze medal
Graeme Randall	81 kg	Gold medal
David Somerville	66 kg	Silver medal
Steven Vidler	90 kg	Bronze medal

Women

Athlete	Events	Medals
Jenni Brien	57 kg	Silver medal
Sarah Clark	63 kg	Silver medal
Amanda Costello	70 kg	Bronze medal
Karen Cusack	52 kg	Bronze medal
Stephanie Hart	+78 kg	Bronze medal
Fiona Robertson	48 kg	Bronze medal
Lindsay Sorrell	78 kg	

=== Lawn bowls ===
Men

Athlete	Events	Club	Medals
Graeme Archer	fours	Sighthill Edinburgh BC	
Darren Burnett	singles	Arbroath BC	
Gary Mackie	fours	Kirkcaldy West End BC	
Alex Marshall	pairs	Gorgie Mills BC, Edinburgh	Gold medal
David Peacock	fours	Danderhall BC	
George Sneddon	pairs	Broxburn BC	Gold medal
Willie Wood	fours	Gifford BC	

Women

Athlete	Events	Club	Medals
Joyce Dickey	fours	Hawick BC	
Betty Forsyth	fours	Blantyre BC	
Sarah Gourlay	fours	Annbank BC	
Margaret Letham	singles	Burbank Hamilton BC	
Joyce Lindores	pairs	Ettrick Forest BC	
Margaret Russell	pairs	Livingston Letham BC	
Sandra Steven	fours	Uphall Station BC	

=== Shooting ===
Men

Athlete	Events	Medals
Sinclair Bruce	prone, prone pair	
Robert Carroll	standard pistol, pair, centre fire, centre fire pair	
Jim Cole-Hamilton	prone, prone pair	
Stewart Cumming	double trap, double trap pair	
David Gillies	trap, trap pair	
Kevin Gray	free pistol, free pistol pair	
Robin Law	air rifle, air rifle pair	
David Lewis	air pistol, pair, free pistol, free pistol pair	
Bruce Lillburn	standard pistol, pair, centre fire, centre fire pair	
Ian Marsden	skeet, skeet pair	
David Marello	trap, trap pair	
Donald McIntosh	3pos, 3pos pair	
Alan Ogilvie	fullbore rifle, fullbore rifle pair	
Alan Ritchie	air pistol	
David Rattray	air rifle, pair	
Ian Shaw	fullbore rifle, fullbore rifle pair	
Martin Sinclair	3pos, 3pos pair	
Colin Will	double trap, double trap pair	
Mike Thomson	skeet, skeet pair	Silver medal

Women

Athlete	Events	Medals
Edith Barnes	skeet	Bronze medal
Susan Jackson	rifle prone, rifle prone pair	Silver medal
Sheena Sharp	rifle prone, rifle prone pair	Silver medal
Lynda Sinclair	rifle 3Pos, rifle 3Pos pair	
Janis Thomson	rifle 3Pos, rifle 3Pos pair	

=== Squash ===
Men

Athlete	Events	Club	Medals
Neil Frankland	singles, doubles, mixed doubles	Surrey	
Martin Heath	singles, doubles, mixed doubles	Oban	

Women

Athlete	Events	Club	Medals
Wendy Maitland	singles, mixed doubles	Aberdeen	
Pamela Nimmo	singles, mixed doubles	Edinburgh	

=== Swimming ===
Men

Athlete	Events	Club	Medals
Cameron Black	50 butterfly		
David Carry	200, 400medley		
Michael Cole	200 medley		
Todd Cooper	50, 100, 200 butterfly		
Ian Edmond	100, 200m breaststroke		
Andrew Jameson	400, 1500 free		
Graeme Smith	400, 1500m free		,
Gregor Tait	50, 100, 200m backstroke		Silver medal

Women

Athlete	Events	Club	Medals
Kirsty Balfour	50, 100, 200 breaststroke, 4x100 medley		
Louise Coull	200 backstroke, 4x100 medley		
Kerry Martin	50m butterfly, 4x100 medley		
Karen Nisbet	200, 400 free		
Alison Sheppard	50, 100m free, 50 butterfly, 4x100 medley		,
Kirsty Thomson	200m backstroke		

=== Synchronised swimming ===
Athlete	Events	Club	Medals
Pauline McFayden	solo		

=== Table tennis ===
Men

Athlete	Events	Club	Medals
Niall Cameron	singles, doubles, team		
Stewart Crawford	singles, doubles, team		
Gavin Rumgay	singles, doubles, team		
Euan Walker	singles, doubles, team		

Women

Athlete	Events	Club	Medals
Claire Bentley	singles		

=== Triathlon ===
Men

Athlete	Events	Club	Medals
Richard Allan	individual		
Kevin Clark	individual		
Andrew Fargus	individual		

Women

Athlete	Events	Club	Medals
Bella Comerford	individual		
Stephanie Forrester	individual		
Catriona Morrison	individual		

=== Weightlifting ===
Men

Athlete	Events	Club	Medals
Stuart Yule	105 kg		Bronze medal
Thomas Yule	94 kg		

Women

Athlete	Events	Club	Medals
Kirstie Law	53 kg		

=== Wrestling ===
Men

Athlete	Events	Club	Medals
Joseph Bianco	84 kg		
Kenny Devoy	66 kg		
Steven McKeown	74 kg		
Douglas Thomson	120 kg		

== See also ==
- Commonwealth Games Council for Scotland
