= Judo at the 2014 Commonwealth Games – Men's 100 kg =

Judo competition

Judo Judo – Men's -100 kg at the 2014 Commonwealth Games
- Venue: Scottish Exhibition and Conference Centre
- Date: 26 July 2014
- Competitors: 13 from 12 nations

Medalists
gold medal	Euan Burton	Scotland
silver medal	Shah Hussain Shah	Pakistan
bronze medal	Jason Koster	New Zealand
bronze medal	Tim Slyfield	New Zealand

The men's -100 kg Judo competitions at the 2014 Commonwealth Games in Glasgow, Scotland was held on 26 July at the Scottish Exhibition and Conference Centre. Judo will return to the program, after last being competed back in 2002.

== Results ==
=== Final ===
Gold medal
Euan Burton (SCO)	1100
Shah Hussain Shah (PAK)	0000

=== Repechages ===
Repechage		Bronze medal
S Pathania (IND)	1000
D Dugasse (SEY)	0000	S Pathania (IND)	000
		T Slyfield (NZL)	100

Repechage		Bronze medal
		J Koster (NZL)	0001
Ruslan Rancev (WAL)	0000	D Didier (AUS)	0003
Duke Didier (AUS)	1002

=== Preliminaries ===
Round of 16
S Pathania (IND)	1000
R Normeshie (GHA)	0000
E Burton (SCO)	1000
E Kengara (KEN)	0000
D Dugasse (SEY)	1001
M Montgomery (NIR)	0001
M Kombo (TAN)	0001
R Rancev (WAL)	1000
S Hussain Shah (PAK)	1001
C George (TRI)	0000

Quarterfinals
J Koster (NZL)	1020
S Pathania (IND)	0003
E Burton (SCO)	1012
D Dugasse (SEY)	0003
T Slyfield (NZL)	0013
R Rancev (WAL)	0001
D Didier (AUS)	0004
S Hussain Shah (PAK)	1001

Semifinals
J Koster (NZL)	0001
E Burton (SCO)	1100
T Slyfield (NZL)	0003
S Hussain Shah (PAK)	0002

Gold medal match
E Burton (SCO)	1100
S Hussain Shah (PAK)	0000
