= Francis Labrosse =

Seychellois judoka

Personal information
- Born: 16 April 1979 (age 47) Beoliere, Mahé, Seychelles
- Occupation: Judoka
- Height: 171 cm (5 ft 7 in)
- Weight: 60 kg (132 lb)

Sport
- Sport: Judo
Medal record
Men's judo
Representing Seychelles
Indian Ocean Island Games
Bronze medal – third place	2011 Victoria	-60 kg

Profile at external databases
- JudoInside.com: 3415

Francis Labrosse (born 16 April 1979) is a Seychellois judoka. He competed in the men's 60 kg events at the 2000 Summer Olympics and the 2004 Summer Olympics.

== Achievements ==
Year	Tournament	Place	Weight class
2002	Commonwealth Games	7th	-60 kg
2006	African Judo Championships	7th	Extra lightweight (60 kg)
2011	Indian Ocean Island Games	3rd	-60 kg
