= Nicholas Kokotaylo =

British judoka

Personal information
- Nationality: British
- Born: 9 March 1955 (age 71) Denton, Greater Manchester, England

Sport
- Sport: Judo

Nicholas Kokotaylo (born 9 March 1955) is a British judoka. He competed in the men's half-heavyweight event at the 1984 Summer Olympics.

Nicholas is also famous for inventing and using the Uki-Gatame technique in 1978 which was recognized by the Kodakan as an official groundwork technique in 2017.

== Judo career ==
Kokotaylo came to prominence when he became champion of Great Britain, winning the light-heavyweight division at the British Judo Championships in 1979. In 1984, he was selected to represent Great Britain at the 1984 Olympic Games in Seoul. He competed in the Men's 95kg category and reached the quarter final stage. In 1986, he won the gold medal in the 95kg weight category at the judo demonstration sport event as part of the 1986 Commonwealth Games.

After the Olympics he went on to win five more British titles (all at light-heavyweight) in 1986, 1988, 1989, 1990 and 1991. He was also a multiple medallist at the British Open.
