= Tim Davis =

Tim Davis may refer to:

- Tim Davis (activist) (born 1955), American cannabis activist
- Tim Davis (American football) (born 1958), American football player and coach
- Tim Davis (artist) (born 1969), American visual artist and poet
- Tim Davis (baseball) (born 1970), American baseball player
- Tim Davis (musician) (1943–1988), American drummer and singer-songwriter
- Tim Davis (actor) (1924–1982), American child actor
- Tim Davis, candidate in the United States House of Representatives elections in Missouri, 2010
- Tim Davis, superintendent of Hillsboro City Schools, a school district in Hillsboro, Ohio, United States

== See also ==
- Timothy Davis (disambiguation)
- Timothy Davies (disambiguation)
