= Jamie Johnson (judoka) =

British judoka

Personal information
- Nationality: British
- Born: 14 May 1972 (age 52)
- Occupation: Judoka

Sport
- Sport: Judo
- Weight class: –60 kg

Profile at external databases
- JudoInside.com: 6487

Jamie Johnson (born 14 May 1972) is a British judoka.

== Judo career ==
Johnson is a five-time champion of Great Britain, winning the British Judo Championships in 1993, 1994, 1997, 1999 and 2000.

=== Other achievements ===
Year	Tournament	Place	Weight class
1997	European Judo Championships	5th	Extra lightweight (60 kg)

== See also ==
- European Judo Championships
- History of martial arts
- List of judo techniques
- List of judoka
- Martial arts timeline
