= Wesley Greenidge =

British judoka (born 1998)

Personal information
- Born: 6 July 1998 (age 28) London, England
- Occupation: Judoka

Sport
- Sport: Judo
- Weight class: +100 kg

Achievements and titles
- European Champ.: R32 (2023)

Profile at external databases
- IJF: 20990
- JudoInside.com: 79792

Wesley Jonathan Greenidge (born 6 July 1998) is a British heavyweight judoka who competes in the +100 kg division. A member of the British Judo national squad, he represents Enfield Judo Club and is coached by George Hyslop. Greenidge is regarded as one of the United Kingdom’s leading competitors in his weight category.

== Personal life ==
Greenidge comes from a sporting family; his cousin, Reiss Greenidge, is a professional footballer and a member of the Guyana national team. His style has contributed to his reputation as a player within the +100 kg division.

== Early career ==
As a cadet and junior, Greenidge earned numerous European Cup medals and was recognised as one of Britain’s most promising judoka. In 2015, he served as the flag bearer for Team GB at the Opening Ceremony of the European Youth Olympic Festival.

== Judo career ==
Greenidge won his first two heavyweight titles at the British Judo Championships in 2021 and 2022. He has achieved significant results on the European Open and European Cup circuits, earning several international medals across senior competition.

In 2023, Greenidge won gold at the Tallinn European Open, along with bronze medals at the Sarajevo European Open and Warsaw Open. He continued to earn podium finishes with bronze medals at the Rome European Open (2024), Conegliano European Open (2025), European Cup Dubrovnik (2025), and European Cup Podgorica (2025). Earlier in his senior career, he also secured bronze at the European Cup Sarajevo in 2022.

In December 2024, he won this third heavyweight title at the British Judo Championships.

== Team Representation ==
Greenidge has contributed to several British Judo team achievements. He was part of the Junior European Championship team in 2017, helping secure a team bronze medal. In 2018, while still a junior, he was selected for the Senior World Championships mixed team event—an uncommon distinction for an athlete of his age. He was also selected to represent Team GB at the 2023 European Championships.
