= Ellen Cobb =

British judoka (born 1940)

Personal information
- Nationality: British
- Born: 14 December 1940 (age 85)
- Occupation: Judoka

Sport
- Sport: Judo
- Weight class: +72 kg
Medal record
Representing Great Britain
European Championships
Bronze medal – third place	1975 Munich	-72kg
Bronze medal – third place	1976 Vienna	+72kg

Profile at external databases
- JudoInside.com: 4916

Ellen Cobb (born 14 December 1940) is a retired British judoka and a massage therapist.

== Career ==
Cobb began her judo training around 1965. She competed successfully in both national and international judo competitions and primarily ran matches in the over-72 kilograms weight class. An article in the UK Judo magazine credits her with being the first female British judoka to earn a gold medal in international competition, after Cobb placed first in a 1972 event in Belgrade. She won medals at two European Judo Championships, placing third in 1975 in the Half Heavyweight category, and second in 1976 in the Heavyweight category. As of 2015, she holds the record for oldest female medal winner in the European Judo Championships at the age of 35 in 1976.

During 1977, Cobb was a full-time judo instructor. and she became champion of Great Britain, winning the heavyweight division at the British Judo Championships. On 20 January 2002, she was promoted to 8th Dan.

Since retiring from judo competition in the 1980s, Cobb has trained in multiple types of massage therapy, including Bowen technique, and now operates her own therapy centre in Hampshire, England.
