= Daniel Sargent (judoka) =

British judoka

Personal information
- Nationality: British (English)
- Born: 21 September 1970 (age 55)
- Occupation: Judoka

Sport
- Sport: Judo
- Weight class: +100 kg
Medal record
Representing England
Commonwealth Games
Silver medal – second place	2002 Manchester	+100kg

Profile at external databases
- IJF: 62036
- JudoInside.com: 2336

Daniel Sargent (born 21 September 1970) is a former British judoka, who won a silver medal at the 2002 Commonwealth Games and is a four times British champion.

== Judo career ==
At the 2002 Commonwealth Games in Manchester, Sargent won the silver medal in the over 100kg category, in the gold medal match he was defeated by Fiji's Nacanieli Qerewaqa.

He is a four times champion of Great Britain, winning the heavyweight division at the British Judo Championships in 1999, 2000, 2001 and 2002.
