= Lakelands Academy =

- The academy logo

Location
- Oswestry Road; Ellesmere; Shrewsbury, Shropshire, SY12 0EA; England
- Coordinates: 52.904096°N 2.901527°W

Information
- Type: Academy
- Local authority: Shropshire Council
- Trust: Lakelands Educational Trust
- Department for Education URN: 139102 Tables
- Ofsted: Reports
- Head teacher: Mark Hignett
- Gender: Mixed
- Age: 11 to 16
- Enrolment: 559 as of January 2022
- Capacity: 580
- Houses: Blakemere, Colemere, Newtonmere and Whitemere
- Website: http://www.lakelandsacademy.org.uk/

Lakelands Academy (formerly The Lakelands School) is a coeducational secondary school located in Ellesmere in the English county of Shropshire.

Previously a community school administered by Shropshire Council, The Lakelands School converted to academy status in December 2012. However the school continues to coordinate with Shropshire Council for admissions.

Lakelands Academy offers GCSEs and BTECs as programmes of study for pupils. In addition the school offers some vocational courses in conjunction with Walford and North Shropshire College. Pupils at Lakelands Academy also have the option to take part in the Duke of Edinburgh's Award programme.

== Notable former pupils ==
- Luke Preston, judoka
