= Tom Hill (judoka) =

Australian Olympic judoka

Personal information
- Full name: Thomas Patrick Hill
- Born: October 1974 (age 51) Canberra, Australian Capital Territory, Australia
- Occupation: Judoka
- Height: 175 cm (5 ft 9 in)
- Weight: 73 kg (161 lb)

Sport
- Country: Australia
- Sport: Judo
- Club: Marist Judo Club; Hill Sports Academy
Medal record
Commonwealth Games
Gold medal – first place	2002 Manchester	73 kg

Profile at external databases
- JudoInside.com: 8902

Thomas Hill (born October 1974) is an Australian judoka. He won a gold medal at the 2002 Commonwealth Games and competed at the 2000 Summer Olympics, where he was eliminated in the first bout. He has been Australian Champion nine times.

== Personal life ==
Thomas also has 6 children who are also judokas.

== See also ==
- Hill family
- List of Commonwealth Games medallists in judo
