= Cheryle Peel =

British judoka (born 1976)

Personal information
- Nationality: British
- Born: 12 February 1976 (age 49)
- Occupation: Judoka

Sport
- Sport: Judo
- Weight class: –56kg/–61kg

Profile at external databases
- JudoInside.com: 2328

Cheryle Peel (born 12 February 1976) is a British judoka. She competed in the women's lightweight event at the 2000 Summer Olympics. She is a three times champion of Great Britain, winning the lightweight division at the British Judo Championships in 1993 and 1994 and the light-middleweight title in 1995.
