= Fiona Robertson =

Scottish judoka and wrestler

Personal information
- Born: 24 April 1969 (age 57) Irvine, Ayrshire, Scotland

Sport
- Sport: Judo and Wrestling
Medal record
Representing Scotland
Commonwealth Games
Bronze medal – third place	2002 Manchester	48kg

Fiona Robertson (born 24 April 1969) is a former judoka and wrestler from Scotland who competed at the Commonwealth Games and won a bronze medal.

== Biography ==
Robertson represented the 2002 Scottish team at the 2002 Commonwealth Games in Manchester, England, where she competed in the 48 kg category and won a bronze medal after defeating Kamla Rawat of India, Alice Livinus of Nigeria and Dolly Moothoo of Mauritius.

She also competed in wrestling at the Commonwealth Games where she came 5th in the 48kg event in 2010 and 5th again in the 48kg event in 2014.

She is the twin sister of judoka and wrestler Donna Robertson.
