= Simone Callender =

British judoka (born 1978)

Personal information
- Nationality: British (English)
- Born: 11 November 1978 (age 47)
- Occupation: Judoka

Sport
- Sport: Judo
- Weight class: +78kg
Medal record
Representing England
Commonwealth Games
Gold medal – first place	2002 Manchester	+78kg

Profile at external databases
- JudoInside.com: 2273

Simone Callender (born 11 November 1978) is a British judoka.

== Judo career ==
Callender, who attended Raine's Foundation School in Bethnal Green is a times seven times champion of Great Britain, winning the heavyweight division at the British Judo Championships in 1996, 1997, 1998, 2000, 2001, 2003 and 2006.

In 2002, she represented England at the 2002 Commonwealth Games and won a gold medal in the over 78 kg event.

== Achievements ==
Year	Tournament	Place	Weight class
1998	European Championships	5th	Open class
1999	European Championships	5th	Open class
2000	European Championships	5th	Open class
2001	European Championships	7th	Heavyweight (+78 kg)
2002	Commonwealth Games	1st	Heavyweight (+78 kg)
2003	European Championships	5th	Open class
