= Rostand Melaping =

Cameroonian judoka

Medal record

Men's judo

Commonwealth Games
Bronze medal – third place	2002 Manchester	90 kg

Rostand Barry Melaping Tchassem (born 14 August 1978) is a Cameroonian judoka.

== Achievements ==
Year	Tournament	Place	Weight class
2002	African Judo Championships	3rd	Middleweight (90 kg)
2002	African Judo Championships	3rd	Open class
2002	Commonwealth Games	3rd	Middleweight (90 kg)
2001	African Judo Championships	2nd	Middleweight (90 kg)
1998	African Judo Championships	5th	Half middleweight (81 kg)
