= Sisilia Nasiga =

Fijian judoka

Personal information
- Born: 16 December 1979 (age 46)
- Occupation: Judoka

Sport
- Sport: Judo
Medal record
Women's Judo
Representing Fiji
Commonwealth Games
Bronze medal – third place	2002 Manchester	Women's 70 kg

Profile at external databases
- JudoInside.com: 14855

Sisilia Nasiga Rasokisoki (born 16 December 1979) is a Fijian judoka. She is one of Fijis most talented Judoka.

Nasiga competed at the 2002 Commonwealth Games in Manchester, where she won bronze in the women's 70 kg. She has won gold at both the South Pacific Games and the South Pacific Judo Championships. In 2008 Nasiga took 3rd place in the 70-kg division in the Zen Nihon Gakusei Taijuubetsu Taikai "All Japan University Student Weight Division Tournament" while she represented Fukuoka Keizai University. She qualified to compete at the 2008 Summer Olympics in Beijing, where she was Fiji's only representative in judo. She had previously competed at the 2004 Summer Olympics in Athens.

Nasiga was defeated by Edith Bosch of the Netherlands at the Beijing Games.
