= Jane Morris (judoka) =

British judoka (born 1969)

Personal information
- Nationality: British (English)
- Born: 23 October 1969 (age 56)
- Occupation: Judoka

Sport
- Sport: Judo
- Weight class: +72 kg
Medal record
Representing England
Commonwealth Games
Gold medal – first place	1990 Auckland	72kg half-heavyweight

Jane Morris (born 1969) is a female former judoka who competed for England.

== Judo career ==
Morris is twice a champion of Great Britain, winning the heavyweight division at the British Judo Championships in 1994 and 1995.

Morris represented England and won a gold medal in the 72 kg half-heavyweight category, at the 1990 Commonwealth Games in Auckland, New Zealand.
