= Winston Gordon =

British judoka (born 1976)

Personal information
- Nationality: British (English)
- Born: 9 November 1976 (age 49) Lambeth, London
- Occupation: Judoka

Sport
- Country: Great Britain
- Sport: Judo
- Weight class: ‍–‍86 kg, ‍–‍90 kg, ‍–‍100 kg

Achievements and titles
- Olympic Games: 5th (2004)
- World Champ.: 7th (2007)
- European Champ.: (bronze) (2006)
- Commonwealth Games: (gold) (2002)
Medal record
Men's judo
Representing Great Britain
European Championships
Bronze medal – third place	2006 Tampere	‍–‍90 kg
European Junior Championships
Bronze medal – third place	1996 Monte Carlo	‍–‍86 kg
Representing England
Commonwealth Games
Gold medal – first place	2002 Manchester	‍–‍90 kg

Profile at external databases
- IJF: 22015
- JudoInside.com: 316
- Updated on 17 November 2022

Winston Alanzo Gordon (born 9 November 1976) is a British former judoka, who competed at three Olympic Games.

== Biography ==
Gordon was born in Lambeth, London. He came to prominence when becoming champion of Great Britain, winning the middleweight division at the British Judo Championships in 1996. After representing Great Britain at two European Championships he won a second British title in 2000, at the heavier middleweight class of -90 kg.

At the 2002 Commonwealth Games in Manchester, he won the gold medal in the under 90kg category. In 2004, he was selected to represent Great Britain at the 2004 Summer Olympics, competing in the men's 90kg he just missed out on winning the bronze medal when he lost to Mark Huizinga in the play off. The following year he won his third British title, this time at half-heavyweight.

In 2006, he won the bronze medal at the 2006 European Judo Championships in Tampere, before gaining selection for a second Olympic Games in 2008. At the games he competed in the men's 90kg class. After winning the 2009 British Open he participated in his third Olympic Games, this time at his 2012 home games in London.

He retired in 2013.

== Personal life ==
He is a Sensei at the EB Phoenix Judo Club in Tooting, London.

== Achievements ==
Year	Tournament	Place	Weight class
1998	European Judo Championships	7th	Middleweight (90 kg)
1999	European Judo Championships	7th	Middleweight (90 kg)
2002	Commonwealth Games	1st	Middleweight (90 kg)
2002	European Judo Championships	5th	Middleweight (90 kg)
2004	Olympic Games	5th	Middleweight (90 kg)
2006	European Judo Championships	3rd	Middleweight (90 kg)
2007	World Judo Championships	7th	Middleweight (90 kg)
2008	Beijing Olympics	--	Middleweight (90 kg)
2012	London Olympics	--	Middleweight (90 kg)
