= James Warren (judoka) =

British judoka

Personal information
- Nationality: British (English)
- Born: 6 May 1974 (age 52) London
- Occupation: Judoka

Sport
- Sport: Judo
- Weight class: –66 kg
Medal record
Representing England
Commonwealth Games
Gold medal – first place	2002 Manchester	-66kg

Profile at external databases
- JudoInside.com: 6574

James Warren (born 6 May 1974) is a former British judoka, who won gold at the 2002 Commonwealth Games.

== Judo career ==
Warren came to prominence when becoming champion of Great Britain, winning the half-lightweight division at the British Judo Championships in 1999 and 2000.

At the 2002 Commonwealth Games in Manchester, he won the gold medal in the under 66kg category, in the final he defeated Scotland's David Somerville. The following year in 2003, he won his third and last British Championship title.

== Acting ==
During the latter part of his judo career and since retiring from judo, Warren has taken up acting and has appeared in several Guy Ritchie films.
