= Graeme Randall =

Scottish judoka

Graeme Randall MBE
Personal information
- Nationality: British (Scottish)
- Born: 14 March 1975 (age 51)
- Occupation: Judoka

Sport
- Sport: Judo
- Weight class: –81 kg
Medal record
Representing Great Britain
World Championships
Gold medal – first place	1999 Birmingham	-81kg
European Championships
Bronze medal – third place	1999 Bratislava	-81 kg
Representing Scotland
Commonwealth Games
Gold medal – first place	2002 Manchester	-81kg

Profile at external databases
- IJF: 53200
- JudoInside.com: 2331

Graeme Randall, MBE (born 14 March 1975) is a former world champion Scottish judoka. He competed at the 1996 Summer Olympics and the 2000 Summer Olympics, and won gold medals in the 81 kg division at both the 1999 World Judo Championships and 2002 Commonwealth Games.

== Biography ==
Randall's judo career started at the early age of 12 and three years later he was awarded his black belt. Randall was educated at Lasswade High School, Midlothian. By the age of 19 he had become the Junior European Champion and won the Junior World bronze medal in the same year, while studying at the University of Edinburgh, where he completed a degree in Physical Education. In 1996, he was selected for Great Britain to compete at the Olympic Games in Atlanta, Georgia. Competing in the -78kg division, he lost his first round match and failed to progress any further. The following year in 1997, he finished fifth at the 1997 World Judo Championships.

In 1996, he won his first Scottish National Championship and in 1998 he became champion of Great Britain, winning the half-middleweight division at the British Judo Championships. The following year in 1999 he won a world title after winning the gold medal in the 81 kg division at the 1999 World Judo Championships. He became Scotland’s first World Judo Champion.

The 1999 success made him a certain selection for the 2000 Olympic Games in Sydney. He fought in the -81kg division but was eliminated in his second match. In 2001, he won his second British Championship and third Scottish national title. Randall represented the 2002 Scottish team at the 2002 Commonwealth Games in Manchester, England, where he competed in the 81 kg category and won the gold medal after defeating Majemite Omagbaluwaje of Nigeria, Tim Slyfield of New Zealand and Thomas Cousins of England.

Not long after the Games, he announced his retirement from the sport. Graeme was awarded an MBE in 2001 for his services to judo, and in recognition of his outstanding level of competitive performance, was awarded the prestigious honour of the sixth Dan. He is Scotland’s most successful judoka, he became one of the youngest players to be awarded the grade.

Randall was inducted into the Scottish Sports Hall of Fame in March 2010. He was the second male from Great Britain to hold a world title in judo. He was also seen in the STV series of Coached Off The Couch.

== Achievements ==
Year	Tournament	Place	Weight class
1997	World Judo Championships	5th	Half middleweight (78 kg)
1998	European Judo Championships	5th	Half middleweight (81 kg)
1999	European Judo Championships	3rd	Half middleweight (81 kg)
1999	World Judo Championships	1st	Half middleweight (81 kg)
2001	World Judo Championships	5th	Half middleweight (81 kg)
2002	Commonwealth Games	1st	Half middleweight (81 kg)
