= Thomas Cousins =

British judoka

Personal information
- Nationality: British (English)
- Born: 3 March 1981 (age 45) Harlow, England
- Occupation: Judoka

Sport
- Country: Great Britain
- Sport: Judo
- Weight class: –81 kg

Achievements and titles
- Commonwealth Games: (silver) (2002)
Medal record
Men's judo
Representing Great Britain
World Juniors Championships
Silver medal – second place	1998 Cali	–81 kg
European Junior Championships
Gold medal – first place	1999 Rome	–81 kg
Gold medal – first place	2000 Nicosia	–81 kg
Silver medal – second place	1998 Bucharest	–81 kg
Representing England
Commonwealth Games
Silver medal – second place	2002 Manchester	–81 kg

Profile at external databases
- JudoInside.com: 308
- Updated on 10 January 2023

Thomas Cousins (born 3 March 1981) is a British former judoka, who won a silver medal at the 2002 Commonwealth Games.

== Judo career ==
At the 2002 Commonwealth Games in Manchester, Cousins won the silver medal in the under 81kg category, in the gold medal match he was defeated by Scotland's Graeme Randall.

He became the champion of Great Britain, winning the half-middleweight division at the British Judo Championships in 2004.

== Personal life ==
His twin brother Peter Cousins is also a British judoka, who competed at the Olympic Games. Thomas is a coach at the West Essex Judo Club.
