= Luce Baillargeon =

Canadian Olympic judoka (born 1977)

Personal information
- Born: 24 July 1977 (age 48) Saint-Hyacinthe, Quebec, Canada
- Occupation: Judoka

Sport
- Sport: Judo
- Rank: 1st dan black belt
Medal record
Representing Canada
Commonwealth Games
Bronze medal – third place	2002 Manchester	Half-lightweight
Pan American Games
Bronze medal – third place	1999 Winnipeg	Half-lightweight

Profile at external databases
- JudoInside.com: 764

Luce Baillargeon (born 24 July 1977 in Saint-Hyacinthe, Quebec) is a Canadian former judoka who competed in the 2000 Summer Olympics. She is a second degree black belt.

Apart from being an Olympian, Luce's highlights include:

- 1997-1999 World Team member
- 1997 World Championships, Paris – 5th
- 1994 Junior World Championships – Silver
- 1999 Pan American Championship – 3rd
- 2004 A-Tournament Leonding – 2nd
- 2002 A-Tournament Minsk – 3rd
- 2001 Polish Open Warsaw – 3rd
- 1997 Fukuoka Tournament – 3rd
- 1997 Czech Cup Prague – 3rd

== See also ==
- Judo in Quebec
- Judo in Canada
- List of Canadian judoka
