= Sam Delahay =

British judoka

Personal information
- Nationality: British (English)
- Born: 30 December 1979 (age 46)
- Occupation: Judoka

Sport
- Sport: Judo
- Weight class: –100 kg
Medal record
Representing England
Commonwealth Games
Silver medal – second place	2002 Manchester	-100kg

Profile at external databases
- JudoInside.com: 310

Sam Delahay (born 30 December 1979) is a former British judoka, who won a silver medal at the 2002 Commonwealth Games.

== Judo career ==
At the 2002 Commonwealth Games in Manchester, Cousins won the silver medal in the under 100kg category, in the gold medal match he was defeated by Canada's Nicolas Gill.

He is a three times champion of Great Britain, winning the middleweight division at the British Judo Championships in 1997 and the half-heavyweight title in 2001 and 2002.

== Personal life ==
His brother Joe Delahay is also a British judoka who was British champion at heavyweight in 2006.
