= Karen Roberts (judoka) =

British Olympic judoka

Personal information
- Nationality: British (English)
- Born: 26 October 1976 (age 50) Reading, England
- Occupation: Judoka

Sport
- Sport: Judo
- Weight class: –63 kg
Medal record
Representing Great Britain
World Championships
Bronze medal – third place	1999 Birmingham	-63 kg
European Championships
Silver medal – second place	2002 Maribor	-63 kg
Summer Universiade
Silver medal – second place	1999 Palma de Mallorca	-63 kg
Representing England
Commonwealth Games
Gold medal – first place	2002 Manchester	-63kg

Profile at external databases
- JudoInside.com: 327

Karen Ann Roberts (born 26 October 1976) is a British former judoka, who competed in the 2000 Summer Olympics.

== Judo career ==
Roberts won the bronze medal at the 1999 World Judo Championships in Birmingham, in the -63 kg category. In 2000, she was selected to represent Great Britain at the 2000 Summer Olympics in Sydney. Competing in the women's 63 kg category she reached the quarter finals.

In 2002, she had a triple success, winning the gold medal at the 2002 Commonwealth Games in Manchester, securing a silver medal at the 2002 European Judo Championships in Maribor and becoming champion of Great Britain, winning the half-middleweight division at the British Judo Championships. The following year in 2003, she successfully defended her British title.
