= Jason Koster =

New Zealand judoka

Personal information
- Full name: Jason Koster
- Nationality: New Zealand
- Born: 11 March 1983 (age 43) Burwood, Christchurch, New Zealand
- Occupation: Judoka

Sport
- Country: New Zealand
- Sport: Judo
- Event: Men's −100 kg
Medal record
Representing New Zealand
Judo
Commonwealth Games
Bronze medal – third place	2014 Glasgow	Men's 100 kg

Profile at external databases
- IJF: 2994
- JudoInside.com: 33128
- Updated on 27 July 2014

Jason Koster (born 11 March 1983) is a New Zealand judoka. He competed in the men's 100 kg event at the 2014 Commonwealth Games where he won a bronze medal.

Koster is married to the judoka Moira de Villiers. They have a daughter together and he has a son from a previous relationship.
