= Samantha Lowe =

English judoka

Personal information
- Born: 20 January 1982 (age 44)
- Occupation: Judoka

Sport
- Sport: Judo
- Weight class: ‍–‍70 kg, ‍–‍78 kg
- Club: Camberley

Achievements and titles
- World Champ.: 9th (2005)
- European Champ.: 7th (2002)
- Commonwealth Games: (gold) (2002)
Medal record
Women's judo
Representing United Kingdom
European U23 Championships
Bronze medal – third place	2004 Ljubljana	‍–‍70 kg
European Junior Championships
Bronze medal – third place	1999 Rome	‍–‍63 kg
Representing England
Commonwealth Games
Gold medal – first place	2002 Manchester	‍–‍70 kg

Profile at external databases
- IJF: 108
- JudoInside.com: 9066
- Updated on 12 February 2022

Samantha Lowe (born 20 January 1982) is an English judoka who won a gold medal in the women's under 70 kg event at the 2002 Commonwealth Games in Manchester.

== Career ==
Lowe studied sports science, and trained at the Camberley Judo Club in Surrey.

In 1998, Lowe won the British Junior Championships under 63 kg event. In 1999, Lowe won a bronze medal at the European Junior Championships in Rome. At the 2002 British Open Championships, Lowe beat fellow English athlete Kate Howey, after Howey broke her wrist in a fall. Both Lowe and Howey claimed that they were winning the fight at the time of the injury.

At the age of 20, Lowe was chosen ahead of Howey to represent England in the under 70 kg (middleweight) event at the 2002 Commonwealth Games in Manchester. Howey appealed against the decision, arguing that she was winning the Open Championship fight before her injury. The Sport Dispute Panel ruled in Howey's favour, and Howey was then selected instead of Lowe. Lowe counterappealed, and was eventually awarded the spot. Lowe maintained that she deserved the spot, as she had better form that season. At the Commonwealth Games, Lowe won a match against Northern Ireland's Claire Rainey in ten seconds. She later beat her Scottish rival Amanda Costello in the semi-finals, before beating Canada's Catherine Roberge to win the gold medal.

Later in the year, she came 7th in the under 70 kg event at the 2002 European Championships. Later in 2002, Lowe sustained an anterior cruciate ligament injury, which required surgery. In 2003, she came second at the Sweden Open event, losing to Canada's Marie-Hélène Chisholm. Lowe was forced to withdraw from the 2003 national championships after reinjuring her leg. In 2004, Lowe passed out during her semi-final match in the 2004 European U23 Championships. She was allowed to compete in the bronze medal match, which she won. The laws had recently been changed; beforehand, she would not have been allowed to compete in the bronze medal match on health grounds. In 2007, Lowe won the under 78 kg event at the Ipswich Judo Championships. In 2009, Lowe came second in the under 78 kg event at the Finnish Open Championships, losing the final to France's Céline Lebrun.
