= Ceri Dallimore =

Welsh sport shooter

Personal information
- Nationality: Welsh

Sport
- Country: Wales
- Sport: Shooting
Medal record
Commonwealth Games
Gold medal – first place	2002 Manchester	Smallbore Rifle Prone Pairs

Ceri Dallimore is a Welsh sport shooter.

Dallimore won a gold medal at the 2002 Commonwealth Games in the Women's Smallbore Rifle Prone Pairs event alongside Johanne Brekke. She also competed at the 2006 Commonwealth Games.
