= Luke Preston =

Welsh judoka (born 1976)

Personal information
- Nationality: British (Welsh)
- Born: 26 May 1976 (age 50)
- Occupation: Judoka

Sport
- Sport: Judo
- Weight class: –81 kg
Medal record
Representing Wales
Commonwealth Games
Bronze medal – third place	2002 Manchester	-81kg

Profile at external databases
- JudoInside.com: 3603

Luke Preston (born 26 May 1976) is a Welsh judoka.

== Biography ==
The oldest of three brothers, Preston grew up in Criftins, Shropshire. As a child, he attended Criftins CE School (primary education), followed by Lakelands Academy, Ellesmere. He is a three times champion of Great Britain, winning the half-middleweight division at the British Judo Championships in 1997, 1999 and 2000.

At the 2002 Commonwealth Games in Manchester, representing Wales he claimed the bronze medal in the -81kg division. He would have undoubtedly gained more success but was unfortunate to have been competing at the same time and in the same weight category as fellow British judoka Graeme Randall and Euan Burton.

== Achievements ==
Year	Tournament	Place	Weight class
2001	European Judo Championships	7th	Half middleweight (81 kg)
2002	Commonwealth Games	3rd	Half middleweight (81 kg)
