= Emeka Onyemaechi =

Nigerian judoka

Personal information
- Born: 28 July 1974 (age 51)
- Occupation: Judoka

Sport
- Sport: Judo
Medal record
Men's judo
Commonwealth Games
Bronze medal – third place	2002 Manchester	+100 kg

Profile at external databases
- JudoInside.com: 32559

Chukwuemeka "Emeka" Benjamin Onyemaechi (born 28 July 1974) is a Nigerian Commonwealth medallist judoka.

== Achievements ==
Year	Tournament	Place	Weight class
2004	African Judo Championships	3rd	Heavyweight (+100 kg)
2002	Commonwealth Games	3rd	Heavyweight (+100 kg)
