= Christodoulos Christodoulides =

Cypriot judoka (born 1976)

Personal information
- Born: 22 August 1976 (age 48)
- Occupation: Judoka

Sport
- Sport: Judo
- Rank: 5th dan black belt

Profile at external databases
- JudoInside.com: 7422

Christodoulos Christodoulides (born August 22, 1976) is a Cypriot judoka who won the silver medal at the 2002 Commonwealth Games. In the final he was defeated by the Australian Tom Hill. He also represented Cyprus at the 2004 Summer Olympics in the 73 kg class, but was eliminated by the Portuguese João Neto in the first round. Over his career, he won seven gold medals (two of them as part of a team) for Cyprus in the Games of the Small States of Europe: in 1995, 1997, 1999, 2001, 2003 and 2009.

He was placed 5th and 7th in the Mediterranean Games 1997 and 2001, 7th in the 2003 European Judo Championships in Maribor, Slovenia, and 9th in the 2003 World Judo Championships in Osaka, Japan. In 2004, he was 11th placed in the World Rank List for 73kg men.

He is now 5th IJF Dan and he is the Technical Director of the Cyprus Judo Federation.

== Achievements ==
| Year | Tournament | Place | Weight class |
|---|---|---|---|
| 2003 | European Judo Championships | 7th | Lightweight (73 kg) |
| 2002 | Commonwealth Games | 2nd | Lightweight (73 kg) |
