= Carly Dixon =

Australian Olympic judoka

Personal information
- Born: 27 September 1973 (age 52) Liverpool, New South Wales, Australia
- Occupation: Judoka
- Height
- Weight

Sport
- Sport: Judo
- Club: Marist Judo Club

Carly Dixon (born 27 July 1973) is an Australian former judoka who competed in the 1996 Summer Olympics, in the 2000 Summer Olympics, and in the 2004 Summer Olympics. She has won nine gold medals at the Australian National Judo Championships.
