= John Buchanan (judoka) =

British judoka (born 1975)

Personal information
- Nationality: British (Scottish)
- Born: 17 December 1975 (age 50)
- Occupation: Judoka

Sport
- Sport: Judo
- Weight class: –60 kg
Medal record
Representing Great Britain
World Championships
Bronze medal – third place	2001 Munich	60 kg
Representing Scotland
Commonwealth Games
Bronze medal – third place	2014 Glasgow	Men's 60 kg

Profile at external databases
- JudoInside.com: 3397

John Buchanan (born 7 December 1975) is a former judoka from Scotland.

== Judo career ==
Buchanan is a five times champion of Great Britain, winning the British Judo Championships in 1995, 1998, 2001 and 2003.

Buchanan represented the 2002 Scottish team at the 2002 Commonwealth Games in Manchester, England, where he competed in the 60 kg category and was eliminated after defeats by eventual gold medal winner Craig Fallon and then Jean-Claude Cameroun.

When judo returned to the Commonwealth Games programme in 2014 he won a bronze medal in the 60 kg extra-lightweight category.

=== Achievements ===
Year	Tournament	Place	Weight class
1999	World Judo Championships	5th	Extra lightweight (60 kg)
2000	European Judo Championships	5th	Extra lightweight (60 kg)
2001	World Judo Championships	3rd	Extra lightweight (60 kg)
2002	European Judo Championships	5th	Extra lightweight (60 kg)
2004	European Judo Championships	7th	Extra lightweight (60 kg)
2014	2014 Commonwealth Games	3rd	Extra lightweight (60 kg)
