= Steven Vidler (judoka) =

Scottish judoka (born 1977)

Personal information
- Nationality: British (Scottish)
- Born: 17 December 1975 (age 50)
- Occupation: Judoka

Sport
- Sport: Judo
- Weight class: –90 kg
Medal record
Representing Scotland
Commonwealth Games
Bronze medal – third place	2002 Manchester	90 kg

Steven Vidler (born 28 August 1977) is a former middleweight judoka from Scotland.

== Judo career ==
Vidler represented the 2002 Scottish team at the 2002 Commonwealth Games in Manchester, England, where he competed in the 90 kg category and won a bronze medal after defeating Virender Singh of India and Gareth Knight of New Zealand.

He also won the silver medal at the 2000 Commonwealth Championships and the gold medal at the 2006 Commonwealth Championships. He finished in a seventh place at the 2005 European Judo Championships, seventh in the 2005 World Cup meet in Rome, and won two US Open events in 2003 and 2004.

He became champion of Great Britain, winning the middleweight division at the British Judo Championships in 2004.

== Personal life ==
He is married to Olympian Michelle Rogers, whom he also coaches. They have a daughter and 2 sons.
