= Martin Kelly (judoka) =

Australian judoka

Personal information
- Full name: Martin James Kelly
- Nationality: Australia
- Born: 20 February 1973 (age 53) Warburton, Victoria, Australia
- Occupation: Judoka
- Height: 1.91 m (6 ft 3 in)
- Weight: 100 kg (220 lb)

Sport
- Sport: Judo
- Event: 100 kg
- Club: Kido Mingara Judo Academy
- Coached by: Pete Acciari
Medal record
Men's judo
Representing Australia
Commonwealth Games
Bronze medal – third place	2002 Manchester	100 kg

Profile at external databases
- JudoInside.com: 8923

Martin James Kelly (born 20 February 1973 in Warburton, Victoria) is an Australian judoka, who competed in the men's half-heavyweight category. He held six Australian titles in his own division, picked up a total of nineteen medals in his career, including a bronze from the 2002 Commonwealth Games in Manchester, England, and represented his nation Australia at the 2004 Summer Olympics. Throughout his sporting career, Kelly trained full-time for the senior team at Kido-Mingarra Judo Academy in Tuggerah, New South Wales, under head coach and sensei Pete Acciari.

Kelly reached the pinnacle of his sporting career in an international level at the 2002 Commonwealth Games in Manchester, England, where he shared bronze medals with Mauritian judoka and 1996 Olympian Antonio Félicité in the men's 100-kg division.

At the 2004 Summer Olympics in Athens, Kelly qualified for the Australian squad in the men's half-heavyweight class (100 kg), by topping the field of judoka and receiving a berth from the Oceania Championships in Nouméa, New Caledonia. Kelly opened his match with a brilliant ippon victory and an uki waza (floating drop) over Barbados' Barry Kirk Jackman, before he was easily beaten by his next opponent and reigning Olympic champion Kosei Inoue of Japan, who threw him down the tatami with uchi mata (inner thigh throw) at one minute and twenty-four seconds.
