= Daniel Rusitovic =

Australian judoka

Personal information
- Nationality: Australian
- Born: 24 January 1976 (age 50) Auburn, New South Wales, Australia
- Occupation: Judoka

Sport
- Sport: Judo
Medal record
Representing Australia
Judo
Commonwealth Games
Bronze medal – third place	2002 Manchester	100+ kg

Daniel Rusitovic (born 24 January 1976) is an Australian former judoka. He competed in the men's half-heavyweight event at the 2000 Summer Olympics.
