= Heath Young =

Australian Olympic judoka

Personal information
- Full name: Heath Francis Young
- Nationality: Australia
- Born: 21 September 1978 (age 47) Sydney, Australia
- Occupation: Judoka
- Height: 1.70 m (5 ft 7 in)
- Weight: 66 kg (146 lb)

Sport
- Sport: Judo
- Event: 66 kg
- Club: Tiger-Do Judo Academy
- Coached by: Terry Young

Profile at external databases
- JudoInside.com: 9276

Heath Francis Young (born 21 September 1978 in Sydney) is an Australian judoka, who competed in the men's half-lightweight category. He held five Australian titles in his own division, picked up a total of thirteen medals in his career, including two golds from the Oceania Championships, and represented his nation Australia in the 66-kg class at the 2004 Summer Olympics. Throughout his sporting career, Young trained full-time for the senior team at Tiger-Do Judo Academy in his native Sydney, under his personal coach, father, and sensei Terry Young.

Young qualified for the Australian squad in the men's half-lightweight class (66 kg) at the 2004 Summer Olympics in Athens, by topping the field of judoka and receiving a berth from the Oceania Championships in Nouméa, New Caledonia. He opened his match with a more satisfying victory over Bolivia's Juan José Paz by points on waza-ari, before losing out in an earth-shattering ippon defeat with a stunning shoulder throw to Cuban judoka and eventual bronze medalist Yordanis Arencibia. In the repechage, Young gave himself a chance for an Olympic bronze medal, but crashed out in the first round of the draft, as Venezuela's Ludwig Ortíz tightly pinned him on the tatami with a kuzure kami shiho gatame (broken upper four-quarter hold-down) at one minute and ten seconds.
