= Tim Slyfield =

New Zealand judoka (born 1975)

Personal information
- Full name: Timothy James Slyfield
- Born: 30 January 1975 (age 51) Howick, New Zealand
- Occupation: Judoka

Sport
- Country: New Zealand
- Sport: Judo
- Events: Men's -81 kg; -100 kg
Medal record
Representing New Zealand
Judo
Commonwealth Games
Bronze medal – third place	2002 Manchester	Men's -81 kg
Bronze medal – third place	2014 Glasgow	Men's -100 kg

Profile at external databases
- JudoInside.com: 3139
- Updated on 27 July 2014

Timothy James Slyfield (born 30 January 1975) is a New Zealand judoka. He won a bronze medal in the 73–81 kg (half-middleweight) division at the 2002 Commonwealth Games. He won another bronze medal in the Men's 100 kg event at the 2014 Commonwealth Games.

He also represented New Zealand in the 2000 Summer Olympics at Sydney.
