= Akram Shah =

Indian judoka

Personal information
- Nationality: Indian
- Born: 27 July 1978 (age 48) Mandalwali, Delhi, India
- Occupation: Judoka
- Height: 5 ft 4.5 in (1.64 m)
- Weight: 60 kg (130 lb)

Sport
- Country: India
- Sport: Judo
Medal record
Men's judo
Representing India
Commonwealth Games
| Silver medal – second place | 2002 Manchester | -60 kg |
Asian Judo Championships
| Bronze medal – third place | 2003 Jeju | -60 kg |
South Asian (SAF) Games
| Gold medal – first place | 2010 Dhaka | -60 kg |

Profile at external databases
- JudoInside.com: 19032

Akram Shah (born 11 June 1974 or 27 July 1978) is an Indian judoka, played in the extra-lightweight (-60 kg) in various National and International tournaments. He was awarded highest Indian Sportsperson Award - Arjuna Award in the year 2003.

He joined the department of Central Reserve Police Force (CRPF) of India on 27 October 1998 on the basis of sports and participated in All India Police Games in Judo event winning Gold medals in 2001 and 2007 and Silver medal in 2005 and 2006. He remained an undisputed hero in the field of National Judo discipline almost ten years from 2000 to 2009 winning medals in every year. He also participated in 2004 Athens Olympics and secured ninth place in Judo event.

== Awards ==
| Year | National Awards |
|---|---|
| 2003 | Arjuna Award |
