= Jean-François Marceau =

Canadian judoka

Personal information
- Born: 26 September 1976 (age 49)
- Occupation: Judoka

Sport
- Sport: Judo
Medal record
Men's Judo
Representing Canada
Pan American Games
Bronze medal – third place	2003 Santo Domingo	Lightweight

Profile at external databases
- JudoInside.com: 835

Jean-François Marceau (born 26 September 1976) is a male judoka from Canada, who won the gold medal at the 2004 US Judo Open in the men's 81 kg division. He beat Shintaro Kakuchi of Japan in the final.

He is the executive director of Judo Québec.

Among his titles:

- 5 times Canadian senior champion
- 2 times Canadian juvenile champion
- 1 time Canadian junior champion
- 2004 U.S. Open champion - 81 kg. gold
- 2003 Pan American Games - 73 kg- bronze
- 2002 Commonwealth Games - 73 kg- bronze

He has also won medals at other competitions including Rendez-vous Canada, Les Jeux de la Francophonie and the Swedish Open.

== See also ==
- Judo in Canada
- List of Canadian judoka
