= Michelle Rogers (judoka) =

British judoka (born 1976)

Personal information
- Nationality: British (English)
- Born: 21 January 1976 (age 50) Salford, England
- Occupation: Judoka

Sport
- Country: Great Britain
- Sport: Judo
- Weight class: +72 kg, –78 kg

Achievements and titles
- Olympic Games: 9th (1996, 2008)
- World Champ.: 5th (1997)
- European Champ.: (silver) (1997)
- Commonwealth Games: (gold) (2002)
Medal record
Women's judo
Representing Great Britain
European Championships
Silver medal – second place	1997 Oostende	+72 kg
Bronze medal – third place	1996 The Hague	+72 kg
Bronze medal – third place	2001 Paris	–78 kg
Bronze medal – third place	2007 Belgrade	–78 kg
European Junior Championships
Gold medal – first place	1994 Lisbon	+72 kg
Bronze medal – third place	1993 Arnhem	+72 kg
Summer Universiade
Gold medal – first place	2001 Beijing	–78 kg
Representing England
Commonwealth Games
Gold medal – first place	2002 Manchester	–78 kg

Profile at external databases
- IJF: 52720
- JudoInside.com: 2334
- Updated on 16 November 2022

Michelle Rogers (born 21 January 1976 in Salford) is a British judoka, who competed at two Olympic Games.

== Judo career ==
Rogers came to prominence after becoming the champion of Great Britain, winning the heavyweight division at the British Judo Championships in 1993. She would win an additional six British titles from 1999 to 2006 at either heavyweight or half-heavyweight.

In 1996, she was selected to represent Great Britain at the Olympics, competing in the heavyweight event at the 1996 Summer Olympics in Atlanta. In 1996, she also won a bronze medal at the 1996 European Judo Championships in The Hague. The following year she won a silver medal at the 1997 European Judo Championships.

In 2001, she won another bronze medal at the 2001 European Judo Championships in Paris before winning the -78 kg gold medal at the 2002 Commonwealth Games in Manchester, defeating Jo Melen of Wales in the final. She won a fourth European medal at the 2007 European Judo Championships, in Belgrade before going to the Olympic Games for the second time. She competed at the 2008 Summer Olympics in the 78kg class.
