= Donna Robertson =

Scottish judoka and wrestler

Personal information
- Born: 24 April 1969 (age 57) Irvine, Ayrshire, Scotland

Sport
- Country: Scotland
- Sport: Judo and Wrestling
Medal record
Commonwealth Games
Bronze medal – third place	1990 Auckland	48kg

Donna Robertson (born 24 April 1969) is a Scottish judoka and wrestler.

Robertson competed in judo at the 1990 Commonwealth Games where she won a bronze medal in the 48kg event.

She also competed in wrestling at the Commonwealth Games, where she came 7th in the 51kg event in 2010 and 7th in the 48kg event in 2014.

She is the twin sister of judoka and wrestler Fiona Robertson.
