= Nacanieli Qerewaqa =

Fijian judoka

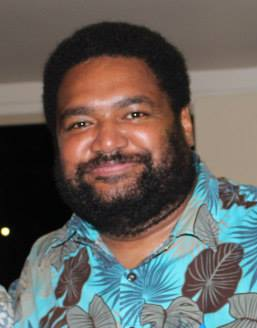
Takayawa in 2014

Nacanieli Qerewaqa Takayawa (born 4 October 1975) is a Fijian judoka.

He won gold in the men's heavyweight event at the 2002 Commonwealth Games in Manchester. Qerewaqa also competed at the 1992, 1996 and 2000 Summer Olympics.
