= Timothy Davies (judoka) =

Welsh judoka (born 1980)

Timothy Davies (born 26 August 1980) is a Welsh judoka.

Davies won the bronze medal in the -66 kg category at the 2002 Commonwealth Games in Manchester.

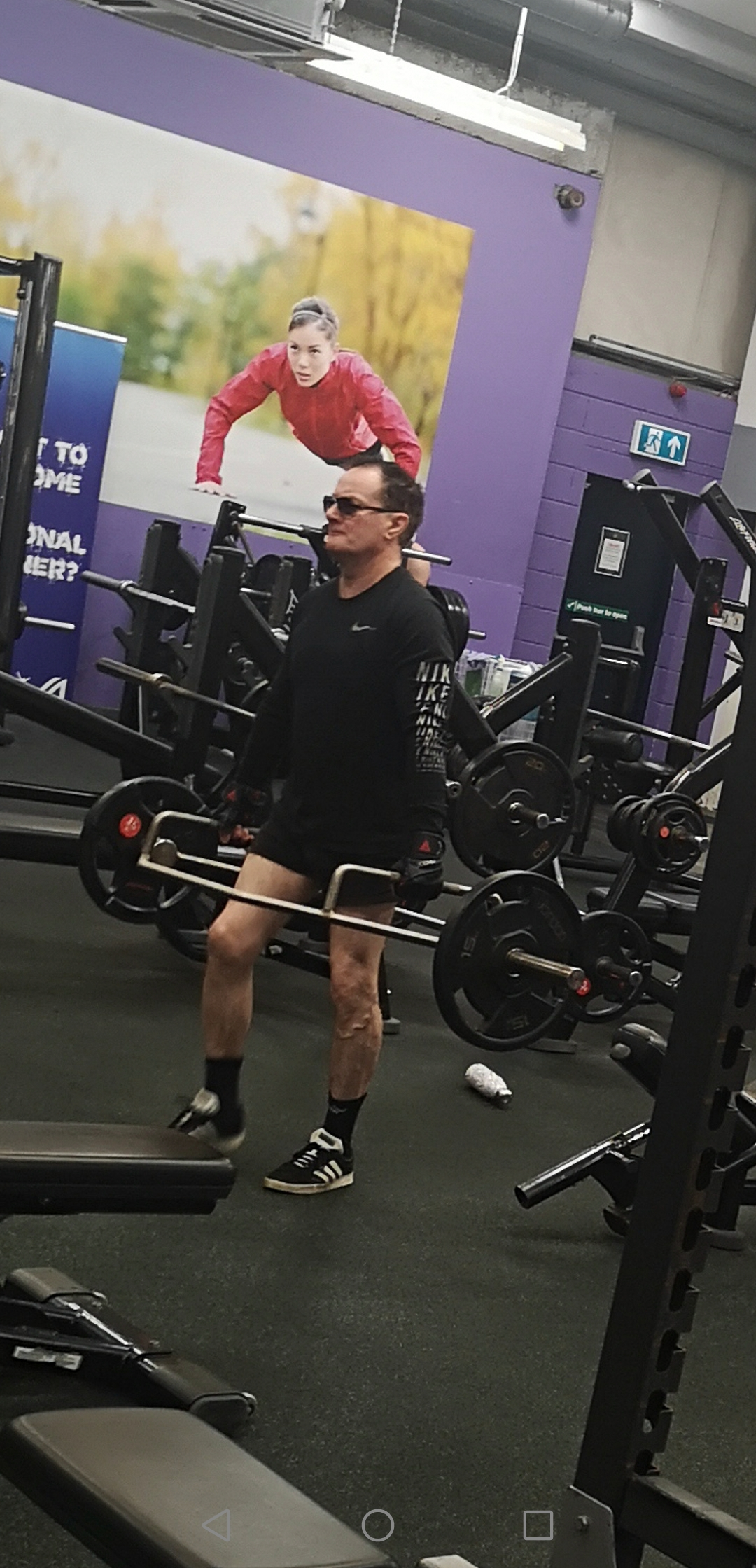
Tim training
