= Judo at the 1990 Commonwealth Games =

Judo competition

Judo Judo at the 1990 Commonwealth Games
- Venue: East Pavilion, Auckland Expo Centre
- Location: Auckland, New Zealand
- Dates: 30 January – 3 February 1990

Competition at external databases
- Links: JudoInside

Judo at the 1990 Commonwealth Games was the second time (but first official time) that Judo at the Commonwealth Games was included as a sport. It had been held as a demonstration sport four years earlier at the 1986 Commonwealth Games.

The events took place in the East Pavilion at the Auckland Expo Center, with the flooring only just completed in time for competition.

England dominated the judo medal table winning 14 of the 16 gold medals.

== Medal table ==
* Host nation (New Zealand)

| Rank | Nation | Gold | Silver | Bronze | Total |
|---|---|---|---|---|---|
| 1 | England | 14 | 0 | 2 | 16 |
| 2 | Scotland | 1 | 3 | 4 | 8 |
| 3 | New Zealand* | 1 | 2 | 2 | 5 |
| 4 | Canada | 0 | 6 | 4 | 10 |
| 5 | Australia | 0 | 3 | 6 | 9 |
| 6 | Wales | 0 | 1 | 4 | 5 |
| 7 | Nigeria | 0 | 1 | 2 | 3 |
| 8 | India | 0 | 0 | 2 | 2 |
| 8 | Northern Ireland | 0 | 0 | 2 | 2 |
| 10 | Malta | 0 | 0 | 1 | 1 |
| Totals (10 entries) | | 16 | 16 | 29 | 61 |

== Medallists ==
| Event | Gold | Silver | Bronze |
|---|---|---|---|
Men
| Extra Lightweight | Carl Finney (ENG) | Kevin West (CAN) | James Charles (WAL); Narender Singh (IND) |
| Half Lightweight | Brent Cooper (NZL) | Mark Preston (SCO) | Mark Adshead (ENG); Jean-Pierre Cantin (CAN) |
| Lightweight | Roy Stone (ENG) | Majemite Omagbaluwaje (NGR) | Billy Cusack (SCO); Colin Savage (NIR) |
| Half Middleweight | David Southby (ENG) | Graeme Spinks (NZL) | Gavin Kelly (AUS); Roger Cote (CAN) |
| Middleweight | Densign White (ENG) | Winston Sweatman (SCO) | Chris Bacon (AUS); Rajender Dhanger (IND) |
| Half Heavyweight | Ray Stevens (ENG) | Dean Lampkin (AUS) | Graham Campbell (SCO); James Kendrick (CAN) |
| Heavyweight | Elvis Gordon (ENG) | Tom Greenway (CAN) | Wayne Watson (NZL) |
| Open | Elvis Gordon (ENG) | Mario Laroche (CAN) | Graham Campbell (SCO); Majemite Omagbaluwaje (NGR) |
Women
| Extra Lightweight | Karen Briggs (ENG) | Helen Duston (WAL) | Julie Reardon (AUS); Donna Robertson (SCO) |
| Half Lightweight | Sharon Rendle (ENG) | Claire Shiach (SCO) | Catherine Grainger (AUS); Lisa Griffiths (WAL) |
| Lightweight | Loretta Cusack (SCO) | Suzanne Williams (AUS) | Ann Hughes (ENG); Moira Sutton (WAL) |
| Half Middleweight | Diane Bell (ENG) | Donna Guy-Halkyard (NZL) | Mandy Clayton (CAN); Laurie Pace (MLT) |
| Middleweight | Sharon Mills (ENG) | Karen Hayde (CAN) | Narelle Hill (AUS); Joyce Malley (NIR) |
| Half Heavyweight | Jane Morris (ENG) | Alison Webb (CAN) | Phillipa Knowles (WAL); Christy Obekpa (NGR) |
| Heavyweight | Sharon Lee (ENG) | Geraldine Dekker (AUS) | Not awarded (only 4 entries) |
| Open | Sharon Lee (ENG) | Jane Patterson (CAN) | Geraldine Dekker (AUS); Nicola Morris (NZL) |

== Men ==
=== Extra Lightweight -60kg ===
| Round | Winner | Loser | Score |
|---|---|---|---|
| 1st Rd | (Canada) Kevin West | (Zambia) Stephen Kailo | Ippon |
| 1st Rd | (Wales) James Charles | (Norfolk Island) Greig Blucher | Waza-ari |
| 1st Rd | (Scotland) Gordon Cameron | (Seychelles) Bernard Marcel | ippon |
| 1st Rd | (India) Narender Singh | (Hong Kong) Woon Yiu Au | ippon |
| 1st Rd | (Australia) Shane Joseph Viglione | (Northern Ireland) Jim Toland | ippon |
| quarter-final | (Canada) Kevin West | (Wales) James Charles | yuko |
| quarter-final | (Scotland) Gordon Cameron | (Nigeria) Osaigbovo Osayimwense | shido |
| quarter-final | (England) Carl Finney | (India) Narender Singh | ippon |
| quarter-final | (Australia) Shane Joseph Viglione | (Singapore) Soon Onn Tang | ippon |
| semi-final | (Canada) Kevin West | (Scotland) Gordon Cameron | wasza-ari |
| semi-final | (England) Carl Finney | (Australia) Shane Joseph Viglione | ippon |
| Repechage | (Wales) James Charles | (Zambia) Stephen Kailo | chui |
| Repechage | (India) Narender Singh | (Australia) Shane Joseph Viglione | yuko |
| Repechage | (Wales) James Charles | (Scotland) Gordon Cameron | ippon |
| Gold medal | (England) Carl Finney | (Canada) Kevin West | chui |

=== Half Lightweight -65kg ===
| Round | Winner | Loser | Score |
|---|---|---|---|
| 1st Rd | (India) Tilak Thapa | (Hong Kong) Wai Keung Leung | ippon |
| 1st Rd | (Scotland) Mark Preston | (Zambia) James Mafuta | ippon |
| 1st Rd | (England) Mark Adshead | (Northern Ireland) Ciaran Ward | ippon |
| 1st Rd | (Cyprus) Elias Ioannou | (Seychelles) Desire Wong | ippon |
| quarter-final | (Canada) Jean Pierre Cantin | (India) Tilak Thapa | yuko |
| quarter-final | (Scotland) Mark Preston | (Australia) Darren Fagan | shido |
| quarter-final | (England) Mark Adshead | (Wales) Dafydd Thomas | yuko |
| quarter-final | (New Zealand) Brent Cooper | (Cyprus) Elias Ioannou | ippon |
| semi-final | (Scotland) Mark Preston | (Canada) Jean Pierre Cantin | koka |
| semi-final | (New Zealand) Brent Cooper | (England) Mark Adshead | yuko |
| Repechage | (Australia) Darren Fagan | (Zambia) James Mafuta | ippon |
| Repechage | (England) Mark Adshead | (Cyprus) Elias Ioannou | ippon |
| Repechage | (Canada) Jean Pierre Cantin | (Australia) Darren Fagan | yusei-gachi |
| Gold medal | (New Zealand) Brent Cooper | (Scotland) Mark Preston | ippon |

=== Lightweight -71kg ===
| Round | Winner | Loser | Score |
|---|---|---|---|
| 1st Rd | (Australia) James Gordon Hallett | (Hong Kong) Siao Chin Chong | ippon |
| 1st Rd | (Scotland) Billy Cusack | (New Zealand) Steve Corkin | ippon |
| 1st Rd | (Nigeria) Majemite Omagbaluwaje | (Singapore) Eok Tan | waza-ari-awasete |
| 1st Rd | (Wales) Andrew Jenkins | (Zimbabwe) James Sibenge | ippon |
| quarter-final | (England) Roy Stone | (Australia) James Gordon Hallett | ippon |
| quarter-final | (Scotland) Billy Cusack | (India) Sandeep Byala | ippon |
| quarter-final | (Nigeria) Majemite Omagbaluwaje | (Northern Ireland) Colin Savage | koka |
| semi-final | (England) Roy Stone | (Scotland) Billy Cusack | yuko |
| semi-final | (Nigeria) Majemite Omagbaluwaje | (Wales) Andrew Jenkins | yuko |
| Repechage | (Scotland) Billy Cusack | (Australia) James Gordon Hallett | shido |
| Repechage | (Northern Ireland) Colin Savage | (Singapore) Eok Tan | ippon |
| Repechage | (Northern Ireland) Colin Savage | (Wales) Andrew Jenkins | chui |
| Gold medal | (England) Roy Stone | (Nigeria) Majemite Omagbaluwaje | yuko |

=== Half Middleweight -78 kg ===
| Round | Winner | Loser | Score |
|---|---|---|---|
| 1st Rd | (Canada) Roger Cote | (India) Chandrama Yadav | ippon |
| 1st Rd | (New Zealand) Graeme Spinks | (Hong Kong) Lap Hing Lam | ippon |
| 1st Rd | (Wales) Daniel Davies | (Northern Ireland) Eric Gwynne | ippon |
| 1st Rd | (England) David Southby | (Nigeria) Iredia Osakwe | chui |
| quarter-final | (Canada) Roger Cote | (Cyprus) Christoduios Katsiniorides | yuko |
| quarter-final | (New Zealand) Graeme Spinks | (Scotland) Ian Armstrong | ippon |
| quarter-final | (England) David Southby | (Australia) Gavin John Kelly | yuko |
| quarter-final | (Wales) Daniel Davies | (Zimbabwe) Patrick Matangi | ippon |
| semi-final | (New Zealand) Graeme Spinks | (Canada) Roger Cote | yusei-gachi |
| semi-final | (England) David Southby | (Wales) Daniel Davies | yuko |
| Repechage | (Scotland) Ian Armstrong | (Hong Kong) Lap Hing Lam | ippon |
| Repechage | (Australia) Gavin John Kelly | (Nigeria) Iredia Osakwe | yuesi-gachi |
| Repechage | (Canada) Roger Cote | (Scotland) Ian Armstrong | ippon |
| Repechage | (Australia) Gavin John Kelly | (Wales) Daniel Davies | Keikoku |
| Gold medal | (England) David Southby | (New Zealand) Graeme Spinks | ippon |

=== Middleweight -86kg ===
| Round | Winner | Loser | Score |
|---|---|---|---|
| 1st Rd | (Australia) Chris Bacon | (Canada) Nicholas Gill | yusei-gachi |
| 1st Rd | (Scotland) Winston Sweatman | (Wales) Simon Woods | ippon |
| 1st Rd | (England) Densign White | (New Zealand) Bill Vincent | ippon |
| semi-final | (England) Densign White | (Australia) Chris Bacon | chui |
| semi-final | (Scotland) Winston Sweatman | (India) Rajender Dhanger | ippon |
| Repechage | (Australia) Chris Bacon | (New Zealand) Bill Vincent | waza-ari awasete |
| Repechage | (India) Rajender Dhanger | (Wales) Simon Woods | ippon |
| Gold medal | (England) Densign White | (Scotland) Winston Sweatman | ippon |

=== Half Heavyweight -95kg ===
| Round | Winner | Loser | Score |
|---|---|---|---|
| 1st Rd | (England) Raymond Stevens | (Scotland) Graham Campbell | ippon |
| 1st Rd | (Northern Ireland) Terry Watt | (Jersey) Chay Pike | yuko |
| 1st Rd | (Canada) James Kendrick | (New Zealand) Michael Smith | koka |
| semi-final | (England) Raymond Stevens | (Northern Ireland) Terry Watt | waza-ari awasete |
| semi-final | (Australia) Dean Henry Lampkin | (Canada) James Kendrick | yusei-gachi |
| Repechage | (Scotland) Graham Campbell | (Northern Ireland) Terry Watt | yuko |
| Gold medal | (England) Raymond Stevens | (Australia) Dean Henry Lampkin | shido |

=== Heavyweight +95kg (Round robin) ===
| Winner | Loser | Score |
|---|---|---|
| (Canada) Tom Greenway | (India) Ram Singh | ippon |
| (England) Elvis Gordon | (Australia) Duane Arthur Pendlebury | ippon |
| (Canada) Tom Greenway | (New Zealand) Wayne Watson | waza-ari |
| (Australia) Duane Arthur Pendlebury | (India) Ram Singh | ippon |
| (England) Elvis Gordon | (New Zealand) Wayne Watson | waza-ari-awasete |
| (Canada) Tom Greenway | (Australia) Duane Arthur Pendlebury | chui |
| (England) Elvis Gordon | (India) Ram Singh | ippon |
| (New Zealand) Wayne Watson | (Australia) Duane Arthur Pendlebury | ippon |
| (England) Elvis Gordon | (Canada) Tom Greenway | ippon |
| (New Zealand) Wayne Watson | (India) Ram Singh | ippon |

=== Open ===
| Round | Winner | Loser | Score |
|---|---|---|---|
| 1st Rd | (Canada) Mario Laroche | (Scotland) Graham Campbell | ippon |
| 1st Rd | (Australia) Chris Bacon | (India) Cawas Billimoria | waza-ari |
| 1st Rd | (New Zealand) Wayne Watson | (Northern Ireland) Terry Watt | ippon |
| 1st Rd | (England) Elvis Gordon | (Nigeria) Majemite Omagbaluwaje | ippon |
| semi-final | (Canada) Mario Laroche | (Australia) Chris Bacon | ippon |
| semi-final | (England) Elvis Gordon | (New Zealand) Wayne Watson | yuko |
| Repechage | (Scotland) Graham Campbell | (Australia) Chris Bacon | yuko |
| Repechage | (Nigeria) Majemite Omagbaluwaje | (New Zealand) Wayne Watson | waza-ari |
| Gold medal | (England) Elvis Gordon | (Canada) Mario Laroche | ippon |

== Women ==
=== Extra Lightweight -48kg ===
| Round | Winner | Loser | Score |
|---|---|---|---|
| 1st Rd | (England) Karen Briggs | (India) Triveni Mannenagaraj | ippon |
| quarter-final | (Wales) Helen Duston | (Australia) Julie Reardon | ippon |
| quarter-final | (New Zealand) Donna Hilton | (Canada) Brigitte Lastrade | koka |
| quarter-final | (England) Karen Briggs | (Hong Kong) Mei Ling Chan | ippon |
| quarter-final | (Scotland) Donna Robertson | (Nigeria) Nse Thompson | koKa |
| semi-final | (Wales) Helen Duston | (New Zealand) Donna Hilton | yusei-gachi |
| semi-final | (England) Karen Briggs | (Scotland) Donna Robertson | ippon |
| Repechage | (India) Triveni Mannenagaraj | (Hong Kong) Mei Ling Chan | yuko |
| Repechage | (Australia) Julie Reardon | (New Zealand) Donna Hilton | ippon |
| Repechage | (Scotland) Donna Robertson | (India) Triveni Mannenagaraj | ippon |
| Gold medal | (England) Karen Briggs | (Wales) Helen Duston | ippon |

=== Half Lightweight -52kg ===
| Round | Winner | Loser | Score |
|---|---|---|---|
| 1st Rd | (England) Sharon Rendle | (Canada) Lyne Poirier | koka |
| 1st Rd | (Wales) Lisa Griffiths | (Hong Kong) Wai Seung Yu | ippon |
| 1st Rd | (Scotland) Claire Shiach | (Australia) Cathy Grainger | yuko |
| 1st Rd | (New Zealand) Tania Moore | (India) Anita Tokas | ippon |
| semi-final | (England) Sharon Rendle | (Wales) Lisa Griffiths | ippon |
| semi-final | (Scotland) Claire Shiach | (New Zealand) Tania Moore | shido |
| Repechage | (Wales) Lisa Griffiths | (Canada) Lyne Poirier | yuko |
| Repechage | (Australia) Cathy Grainger | (New Zealand) Tania Moore | ippon |
| Gold medal | (England) Sharon Rendle | (Scotland) Claire Shiach | yuko |

=== Lightweight -56kg ===
| Round | Winner | Loser | Score |
|---|---|---|---|
| 1st Rd | (Australia) Suzanne Elizabeth Williams | (Canada) Nathalie Gosselin | ippon |
| quarter-final | (Nigeria) Grace Osagie | (India) Sunith Thakur | waza-ari-awasete |
| quarter-final | (Scotland) Loretta Cusack | (Wales) Moira Sutton | koka |
| quarter-final | (Australia) Suzanne Elizabeth Williams | (Hong Kong) Lai Wah Law | ippon |
| semi-final | (Scotland) Loretta Cusack | (Nigeria) Grace Osagie | yuko |
| semi-final | (Australia) Suzanne Elizabeth Williams | (England) Ann Hughes | yuko |
| Repechage | (Wales) Moira Sutton | (Nigeria) Grace Osagie | yusei-gachi |
| Repechage | (Canada) Nathalie Gosselin | (Hong Kong) lah Wah Law | ippon |
| Repechage | (England) Ann Hughes | (Canada) Nathalie Gosselin | ippon |
| Gold medal | (Scotland) Loretta Cusack | (Australia) Suzanne Elizabeth Williams | ippon |

=== Half Middleweight -61 kg ===
| Round | Winner | Loser | Score |
|---|---|---|---|
| 1st Rd | (England) Diane Bell | (Hong Kong) Kam Fan Wan | yuko |
| 1st Rd | (Canada) Mandy Clayton | (Australia) Lara Sullivan | kiken-gachi |
| 1st Rd | (New Zealand) Donna Guy-Halkyard | (India) Preeti Sharma | waza-ari-awasete |
| 1st Rd | (Malta) Laurie Pace | (Scotland) Michele McQuarrie | yuko |
| semi-final | (England) Diane Bell | (Canada) Mandy Clayton | ippon |
| semi-final | (New Zealand) Donna Guy-Halkyard | (Malta) Laurie Pace | ippon |
| Repechage | (Canada) Mandy Clayton | (Hong Kong) Kam Fan Wan | ippon |
| Repechage | (Malta) Laurie Pace | (India) Preeti Sharma | ippon |
| Gold medal | (England) Diane Bell | (New Zealand) Donna Guy-Halkyard | yuko |

=== Middleweight -66kg ===
| Round | Winner | Loser | Score |
|---|---|---|---|
| 1st Rd | (England) Sharon Mills | (New Zealand) Nicola Morris | ippon |
| 1st Rd | (Canada) Karen Hayde | (Australia) Narelle Hill | ippon |
| semi-final | (England) Sharon Mills | (Northern Ireland) Joyce Malley | ippon |
| semi-final | (Canada) Karen Hayde | (Scotland) Doreen Bagnall | waza-ari |
| Repechage | (Australia) Narelle Hill | (Scotland) Doreen Bagnall | waza-ari |
| Repechage | (Northern Ireland) Joyce Malley | (New Zealand) Nicola Morris | yuko |
| Gold medal | (England) Sharon Mills | (Canada) Karen Hayde | yuko |

=== Half Heavyweight -72kg ===
| Round | Winner | Loser | Score |
|---|---|---|---|
| 1st Rd | (England) Jane Morris | (New Zealand) Tracy Down | koka |
| 1st Rd | (Canada) Alison Webb | (Wales) Phillipa Knowles | waza-ari awasete |
| semi-final | (England) Jane Morris | (Nigeria) Christy Obekpa | yuko |
| semi-final | (Canada) Alison Webb | (Australia) Diana Fanuli | shido |
| Repechage | (Nigeria) Christy Obekpa | (New Zealand) Tracy Down | ippon |
| Repechage | (Wales) Phillipa Knowles | (Australia) Diana Fanuli | ippon |
| Gold medal | (England) Jane Morris | (Canada) Alison Webb | yusei-gachi |

=== Heavyweight +72kg (Round robin) ===
| Winner | Loser | Score |
|---|---|---|
| (Isle of Man) Ruth Vondy | (Canada) Linda Konkol | yuko |
| (England) Sharon Lee | (Australia) Geraldine Dekker | waza-ari-awasete |
| (Australia) Geraldine Dekker | (Canada) Linda Konkol | waza-ari |
| (England) Sharon Lee | (Isle of Man) Ruth Vondy | ipp |
| (Australia) Geraldine Dekker | (Isle of Man) Ruth Vondy | waza-ari |
| (England) Sharon Lee | (Canada) Linda Konkol | waza-ari awasete |

=== Open ===
| Round | Winner | Loser | Score |
|---|---|---|---|
| 1st Rd | (England) Sharon Lee | (Australia) Geraldine Dekker | yuko |
| 1st Rd | (Nigeria) Christy Obekpa | (Scotland) Doreen Bagnall | ippon |
| 1st Rd | (Canada) Jane Patterson | (New Zealand) Nicola Morris | yuko |
| 1st Rd | (Isle of Man) Ruth Vondy | (Northern Ireland) Joyce Malley | koka |
| semi-final | (England) Sharon Lee | (Nigeria) Christy Obekpa | koka |
| semi-final | (Canada) Jane Patterson | (Isle of Man) Ruth Vondy | ippon |
| Repechage | (Australia) Geraldine Dekker | (Nigeria) Christy Obekpa | ippon |
| Repechage | (New Zealand) Nicola Morris | (Isle of Man) Ruth Vondy | ippon |
| Gold medal | (England) Sharon Lee | (Canada) Jane Patterson | ippon |
