= Judo at the 1988 Summer Olympics – Men's 86 kg =

Judo at the Olympics

Men's 86 kg at the Games of the XXIV Olympiad
- Venue: Jangchung Gymnasium
- Date: 29 September 1988
- Competitors: 36 from 36 nations

Medalists
1st place, gold medalist(s)		Peter Seisenbacher	Austria
2nd place, silver medalist(s)		Vladimir Shestakov	Soviet Union
3rd place, bronze medalist(s)		Akinobu Osako	Japan
3rd place, bronze medalist(s)		Ben Spijkers	Netherlands

The men's 86 kg competition in judo at the 1988 Summer Olympics in Seoul was held on 29 September at the Jangchung Gymnasium. The gold medal was won by Peter Seisenbacher of Austria.

== Results ==
=== Pool A ===
Round of 64
Densign White (GBR)	YUS
Luc Suplis (BEL)	E
Michael Bazynski (FRG)	E
Ben Spijkers (NED)	YUK

Round of 32
Densign White (GBR)	YUK
Sandro López (ARG)	R
Bill Vincent (NZL)	IPO
Louis Jani (CAN)	E
Chiu Heng-an (TPE)	WAZ
Bito Maduro (ARU)	E
Vladimir Shestakov (URS)	IPO
Josateki Basalusalu (FIJ)	R
Ben Spijkers (NED)	YUK
Rene Capo (USA)	E
Ivan Todorov (YUG)	E
Odvogiin Baljinnyam (MGL)	IPO
Franch Casadei (SMR)	E
János Gyáni (HUN)	WIP
Ng Chiu Fan (HKG)	E
Georgi Petrov (BUL)	IPO

Round of 16
Densign White (GBR)	IPO
Bill Vincent (NZL)	E
Chiu Heng-an (TPE)	R
Vladimir Shestakov (URS)	IPO
Ben Spijkers (NED)	IPO
Odvogiin Baljinnyam (MGL)	E
János Gyáni (HUN)	IPO
Hisham Al-Sharaf Rashad (KUW)	E

Quarterfinal
Densign White (GBR)	R
Vladimir Shestakov (URS)	YUS
Ben Spijkers (NED)	YUS
János Gyáni (HUN)	E

Semifinal
Vladimir Shestakov (URS)	KOK
Ben Spijkers (NED)	R

=== Pool B ===
Round of 64
Eric-Louis Bessi (MON)	E
William Medina (COL)	IPO
Arnold Frick (LIE)	E
Akilong Diabone (SEN)	IPO

Round of 32
William Medina (COL)	E
Riad Chibani (ALG)	WAZ
Yousuf Al-Hammad (KUW)	E
Fabien Canu (FRA)	WIP
Jorge Bonnet (PUR)	R
Peter Seisenbacher (AUT)	IPO
Tiberius Nyachwaya (KEN)	E
Kim Seung-gyu (KOR)	WIP
Akilong Diabone (SEN)	E
Charles Griffith (VEN)	WAZ
James Waithe (BAR)	E
Liu Junlin (CHN)	IPO
Akinobu Osako (JPN)	WIP
José António Inácio (ANG)	E
West Iqiebor (NGR)	E
Wálter Carmona (BRA)	HAN

Round of 16
Riad Chibani (ALG)	E
Fabien Canu (FRA)	KOK
Peter Seisenbacher (AUT)	IPO
Kim Seung-gyu (KOR)	R
Charles Griffith (VEN)	E
Liu Junlin (CHN)	KIK
Akinobu Osako (JPN)	YUS
Wálter Carmona (BRA)	E

Quarterfinal
Fabien Canu (FRA)	R
Peter Seisenbacher (AUT)	YUK
Liu Junlin (CHN)	E
Akinobu Osako (JPN)	IPO

Semifinal
Peter Seisenbacher (AUT)	YUK
Akinobu Osako (JPN)	R

=== Repechages ===
Repechage quarterfinal		Repechage semifinal		Repechage final
Josateki Basalusalu (FIJ)	E
Chiu Heng-an (TPE)	WAZ	Chiu Heng-an (TPE)	E
		Densign White (GBR)	IPO
				Densign White (GBR)	E
				Ben Spijkers (NED)	WAZ (bronze)

Repechage quarterfinal		Repechage semifinal		Repechage final
Jorge Bonnet (PUR)	E
Kim Seung-gyu (KOR)	WIP	Kim Seung-gyu (KOR)	E
		Fabien Canu (FRA)	YUS
				Fabien Canu (FRA)	E
				Akinobu Osako (JPN)	YUS (bronze)

=== Final ===
Final
Vladimir Shestakov (URS)	2nd place, silver medalist(s)
Peter Seisenbacher (AUT)	YUS (gold)

== Final classification ==
Rank	Name	Country
1	Peter Seisenbacher	Austria
2	Vladimir Shestakov	Soviet Union
3T	Akinobu Osako	Japan
3T	Ben Spijkers	Netherlands
5T	Fabien Canu	France
5T	Densign White	Great Britain
7T	Chiu Heng-an	Chinese Taipei
7T	Kim Seung-gyu	South Korea
9T	Josateki Basalusalu	Fiji
9T	Jorge Bonnet	Puerto Rico
11T	János Gyáni	Hungary
11T	Liu Junlin	China
13T	Bill Vincent	New Zealand
13T	Odvogiin Baljinnyam	Mongolia
13T	Charles Griffith	Venezuela
13T	Georgi Petrov	Bulgaria
13T	Riad Chibani	Algeria
13T	Wálter Carmona	Brazil
19T	Sandro López	Argentina
19T	Louis Jani	Canada
19T	Bito Maduro	Aruba
19T	José António Inácio	Angola
19T	Rene Capo	United States
19T	Ivan Todorov	Yugoslavia
19T	Franch Casadei	San Marino
19T	Ng Chiu Fan	Hong Kong
19T	William Medina	Colombia
19T	Yousuf Al-Hammad	Kuwait
19T	West Iqiebor	Nigeria
19T	Tiberius Nyachwaya	Kenya
19T	Akilong Diabone	Senegal
19T	James Waithe	Barbados
33T	Luc Suplis	Belgium
33T	Michael Bazynski	West Germany
33T	Eric-Louis Bessi	Monaco
33T	Arnold Frick	Liechtenstein
