= Judo at the 1984 Summer Olympics – Men's 86 kg =

Judo at the Olympics

Men's 86 kg at the Games of the XXIII Olympiad
- Venue: California State University, Los Angeles
- Date: 8 August 1984
- Competitors: 29 from 29 nations

Medalists
1st place, gold medalist(s)		Peter Seisenbacher	Austria
2nd place, silver medalist(s)		Robert Berland	United States
3rd place, bronze medalist(s)		Walter Carmona	Brazil
3rd place, bronze medalist(s)		Seiki Nose	Japan

The men's 86 kg competition in judo at the 1984 Summer Olympics in Los Angeles was held on 8 August at the California State University. The gold medal was won by Peter Seisenbacher of Austria.

== Results ==
=== Pool A ===
Round of 32
Chang Shou-chung (TPE)	IPO
Séraphin Okuaka (CGO)	E
Stanko Lopatić (YUG)	R
Peter Seisenbacher (AUT)	WIP
Hussain Shareef (KUW)	E
Eduardo Novoa (CHI)	IPO
Seiki Nose (JPN)	IPO
Kostas Papakostas (CYP)	E
Louis Jani (CAN)	E
Marc Meiling (FRG)	YUS
Clément Nzali (CMR)	E
Fabien Canu (FRA)	YUK
Andrew Richardson (AUS)	E
Park Kyung-ho (KOR)	WAZ
Bill Vincent (NZL)	IPO
Alejandro Strático (ARG)	E

Round of 16
Chang Shou-chung (TPE)	R
Peter Seisenbacher (AUT)	IPO
Eduardo Novoa (CHI)	E
Seiki Nose (JPN)	IPO
Marc Meiling (FRG)	E
Fabien Canu (FRA)	IPO
Park Kyung-ho (KOR)	IPO
Bill Vincent (NZL)	E

Quarterfinal
Peter Seisenbacher (AUT)	IPO
Seiki Nose (JPN)	R
Fabien Canu (FRA)	YUK
Park Kyung-ho (KOR)	E

Semifinal
Peter Seisenbacher (AUT)	IPO
Fabien Canu (FRA)	R

=== Pool B ===
Round of 32
Eric-Louis Bessi (MON)	E
Densign White (GBR)	WIP
Alfonso García (ESP)	HAN
Mario Vecchi (ITA)	E
Robert Berland (USA)	WO
Mohamed Lamine Sano (GUI)	DNS
Franch Casadei (SMR)	E
Magnus Büchel (LIE)	YUK
Gilbert Gustin (BEL)	DNS
Ben Spijkers (NED)	WO
José Fuentes (PUR)	E
Hamza Doublali (MAR)	YUS
Atif Muhammad Hussain (EGY)	E
Walter Carmona (BRA)	IPO

Round of 16
Densign White (GBR)	IPO
Alfonso García (ESP)	E
Robert Berland (USA)	IPO
Magnus Büchel (LIE)	R
Ben Spijkers (NED)	IPO
Hamza Doublali (MAR)	E
Walter Carmona (BRA)	IPO
Michel Grant (SWE)	E

Quarterfinal
Densign White (GBR)	R
Robert Berland (USA)	YUS
Ben Spijkers (NED)	E
Walter Carmona (BRA)	YUS

Semifinal
Robert Berland (USA)	YUK
Walter Carmona (BRA)	R

=== Repechages ===
Repechage		Repechage semifinal		Repechage final
Stanko Lopatić (YUG)	KOK
Johannes Wohlwend (LIE)	E	Stanko Lopatić (YUG)	E
		Seiki Nose (JPN)	IPO
				Seiki Nose (JPN)	IPO (bronze)
				Fabien Canu (FRA)	E

Repechage	Repechage semifinal		Repechage final
	Magnus Büchel (LIE)	E
	Densign White (GBR)	IPO
			Densign White (GBR)	E
			Walter Carmona (BRA)	KOK (bronze)

=== Final ===
Final
Peter Seisenbacher (AUT)	IPO (gold)
Robert Berland (USA)	2nd place, silver medalist(s)

== Final classification ==
Rank	Judoka	Nation
1st place, gold medalist(s)	Peter Seisenbacher	Austria
2nd place, silver medalist(s)	Robert Berland	United States
3rd place, bronze medalist(s)	Walter Carmona	Brazil
3rd place, bronze medalist(s)	Seiki Nose	Japan
5T	Fabien Canu	France
5T	Densign White	Great Britain
7T	Magnus Büchel	Liechtenstein
7T	Stanko Lopatić	Yugoslavia
9	Chang Shou-chung	Chinese Taipei
10T	Park Gyeong-ho	South Korea
10T	Ben Spijkers	Netherlands
12T	Michel Grant	Sweden
12T	Eduardo Novoa	Chile
12T	Marc Meiling	West Germany
12T	Bill Vincent	New Zealand
12T	Alfonso García	Spain
12T	Hamza Doublali	Morocco
18T	Séraphin Okuaka	Republic of the Congo
18T	Andrew Richardson	Australia
18T	Hussain Shareef	Kuwait
18T	Kostas Papakostas	Cyprus
18T	Louis Jani	Canada
18T	Clément Nzali	Cameroon
18T	Alejandro Strático	Argentina
18T	Eric-Louis Bessi	Monaco
18T	Mario Vecchi	Italy
18T	Franch Casadei	San Marino
18T	José Fuentes	Puerto Rico
18T	Atif Muhammad Hussain	Egypt
