= Austrian Judo Federation =

Judo federation

Österreichischer Judoverband
- Sport: Judo
- Jurisdiction: Austria
- Abbreviation: ÖJV
- Founded: 30 September 1947
- Affiliation: IJF
- Regional affiliation: EJU
- Headquarters: Vienna, Austria
- President: Poiger Martin
- Secretary: Mag. Korner Corina
- Coach: Yvonne Snir-Bönisch

Official website
- judoaustria.at
- (Austria)

The Austrian Judo Federation (German: Österreichischer Judoverband - ÖJV) is the national organisation for judo in Austria. The president is POIGER Martin. The Austrian Judo Federation is affiliated with the International Judo Federation. Its headquarters are in Vienna.

== History ==
In 2010, the Austrian Judo Federation played host to the European Championships in Vienna, which were attended by Vladimir Putin.

== Board ==
- President: Martin Poiger
- Vice Presidents: Sabrina Filzmoser, Gerald Eidenberger, Albert Gmeiner, Jochen Haidvogel, Hans Peter Zopf
- Athlete Spokesperson: Magdalena Krssakova
- Finance Officer: Silvia Ehrengruber
- Legal Secretary: Andreas Weinzierl
- Technical Director: Thomas Stückler
- Deputy: Karin Dorfinger, Veronika Jakl, Horst Felzl, Martin Stump

== Austrian judokas ==
Medal record

Olympic Games
Gold medal – first place	Peter Seisenbacher	1988
Gold medal – first place	Peter Seisenbacher	1984
Silver medal – second place	Michaela Polleres	2020
Silver medal – second place	Ludwig Paischer	2008
Silver medal – second place	Claudia Heill	2004
Bronze medal – third place	Michaela Polleres	2024
Bronze medal – third place	Shamil Borchashvili	2020
Bronze medal – third place	Josef Reiter	1984

World Judo Championships
Gold medal – first place	Peter Seisenbacher	1985
Gold medal – first place	Edith Hrovat	1980
Gold medal – first place	Gerda Winklbauer	1980
Gold medal – first place	Edith Simon	1980
Silver medal – second place	Ludwig Paischer	2005
Silver medal – second place	Edith Hrovat	1984
Bronze medal – third place	Michaela Polleres	2023
Bronze medal – third place	Shamil Borchashvili	2022
Bronze medal – third place	Michaela Polleres	2021
Bronze medal – third place	Sabrina Filzmoser	2010
Bronze medal – third place	Ludwig Paischer	2007
Bronze medal – third place	Sabrina Filzmoser	2005
Bronze medal – third place	Patrick Reiter	1997
Bronze medal – third place	Patrick Reiter	1995
Bronze medal – third place	Roswitha Hartl	1987
Bronze medal – third place	Gerda Winklbauer	1984
Bronze medal – third place	Karin Posch	1982

Medal record

Paralympic Games
Gold medal – first place	Walter Hanl	2000
Gold medal – first place	Walter Hanl	1996

- Peter Seisenbacher, two-time Olympic gold medallist
- Michaela Polleres, Olympic silver and bronze medallist
- Ludwig Paischer, Olympic silver medallist
- Claudia Heill (1982–2011), Olympic silver medallist
- Shamil Borchashvili, Olympic bronze medallist
- Josef Reiter, Olympic bronze medallist
- Walter Hanl, two-time Paralympic gold medallist

== National League ==
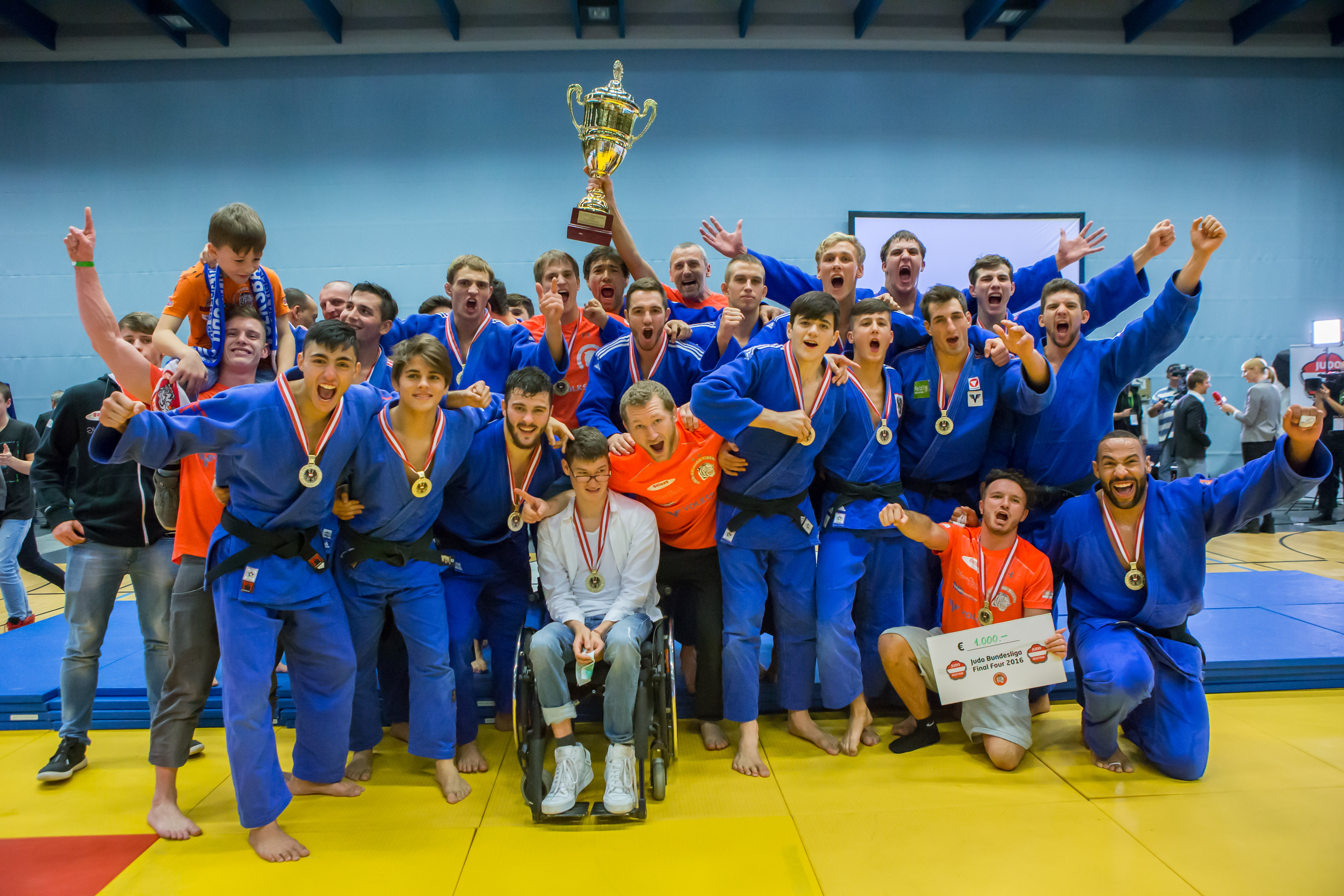
Volksbank Galaxy Tigers - winner of the Austrian Judo Bundeslia 2016

The Austrian Judo Federation organizes the Judo-Bundesliga. This is the national league. It is divided into the Erste Judo Bundesliga and the Zweite Judo Bundesliga for men and the Frauen Judo Bundesliga for women. The league exists since 1948.

== See also ==
- List of judo organizations
- Judo by country
