= Preschel =

Preschel is a surname. Notable people with the surname include:

- Andreas Preschel (born 1961), East German judoka
- Tovia Preschel (1922–2013), Austrian biographer, historian and journalist
