= Austrian Sports Personality of the Year =

Austrian sports award

The Austrian Sports Personality of the Year (German: Sportler des Jahres) is chosen annually since 1949. Recordholders are Annemarie Moser-Pröll (seven awards) and Marcel Hirscher (six awards). In 1978 and 1979 the Austria national football team was named Austrian Sports Team of the Year. Since 1990 this prize is included in the annual election.

AUSTRIAN SPORTS PERSONALITY OF THE YEAR
YEAR	MALE		FEMALE		TEAM
1949	Richard Menapace	Cycling	Ellen Müller-Preis	Fencing	—
1950	Walter Zeman	Association football	Dagmar Rom	Alpine skiing	—
1951	Ernst Ocwirk	Association football	Erika Mahringer	Alpine skiing	—
1952	Othmar Schneider	Alpine skiing	Trude Jochum-Beiser	Alpine skiing	—
1953	Hermann Buhl	Mountaineering	Trude Klecker	Alpine skiing	—
1954	Rupert Hollaus	Motorsport	Fritzi Schwingl	Canoe racing	—
1955	Gerhard Hanappi	Association football	Hanna Eigel	Figure skating	—
ONE AWARD (MALE OR FEMALE)
1956	Toni Sailer	Alpine skiing	—		—
1957	Toni Sailer & Adolf Christian (ex aequo)	Alpine skiing & Cycling	—		—
1958	Toni Sailer	Alpine skiing	—		—
1959	Karl Schranz	Alpine skiing	—		—
1960	Ernst Hinterseer	Alpine skiing	—		—
1961	Heinrich Thun	Athletics	—		—
1962	Karl Schranz	Alpine skiing	—		—
1963	Heinrich Thun	Athletics	—		—
1964	Josef Stiegler	Alpine skiing	—		—
1965	Kurt Presslmayr	Canoe racing	—		—
1966	Emmerich Danzer	Figure skating	—		—
1967	Emmerich Danzer	Figure skating	—		—
1968	—		Olga Pall	Alpine skiing	—
1969	—		Liese Prokop	Athletics	—
1970	Karl Schranz	Alpine skiing	—		—
1971	—		Ilona Gusenbauer	Athletics	—
1972	—		Beatrix Schuba	Figure skating	—
1973	—		Annemarie Moser-Pröll	Alpine skiing	—
TWO AWARDS (MALE AND FEMALE)
1974	David Zwilling	Alpine skiing	Annemarie Moser-Pröll	Alpine skiing	—
1975	Franz Klammer	Alpine skiing	Annemarie Moser-Pröll	Alpine skiing	—
1976	Franz Klammer	Alpine skiing	Brigitte Habersatter	Alpine skiing	—
1977	Niki Lauda	Motorsport	Annemarie Moser-Pröll	Alpine skiing	—
1978	Sepp Walcher	Alpine skiing	Annemarie Moser-Pröll	Alpine skiing	Men's national team	Association football
1979	Armin Kogler	Ski jumping	Annemarie Moser-Pröll	Alpine skiing	Men's national team	Association football
1980	Anton Innauer	Ski jumping	Annemarie Moser-Pröll	Alpine skiing	—
1981	Armin Kogler	Ski jumping	Claudia Kristofics-Binder	Figure skating	—
1982	Armin Kogler	Ski jumping	Claudia Kristofics-Binder	Figure skating	—
1983	Franz Klammer	Alpine skiing	Gerda Winklbauer	Judo	—
1984	Peter Seisenbacher	Judo	Edith Hrovat	Judo	—
1985	Peter Seisenbacher	Judo	Elisabeth Kirchler	Alpine skiing	—
1986	Michael Hadschieff	Speed skating	Roswitha Steiner	Alpine skiing	—
1987	Andreas Felder	Ski jumping	Sigrid Wolf	Alpine skiing	—
1988	Peter Seisenbacher	Judo	Sigrid Wolf	Alpine skiing	—
1989	Rudolf Nierlich	Alpine skiing	Ulrike Maier	Alpine skiing	—
1990	Thomas Muster	Tennis	Petra Kronberger	Alpine skiing	Davis Cup team	Tennis
1991	Stephan Eberharter	Alpine skiing	Petra Kronberger	Alpine skiing	Men's national team	Nordic combined
1992	Patrick Ortlieb	Alpine skiing	Petra Kronberger	Alpine skiing	Four-man national team	Bobsleigh
1993	Andreas Goldberger	Ski jumping	Anita Wachter	Alpine skiing	Coxless four men's national team	Rowing
1994	Thomas Stangassinger	Alpine skiing	Emese Hunyady	Speed skating	SV Austria Salzburg	Association football
1995	Thomas Muster	Tennis	Ursula Profanter	Canoe racing	Coxless four men's national team	Rowing
1996	Andreas Goldberger	Ski jumping	Theresia Kiesl	Athletics	SK Rapid Wien	Association football
1997	Toni Polster	Association football	Renate Götschl	Alpine skiing	Men's national team	Association football
1998	Hermann Maier	Alpine skiing	Alexandra Meissnitzer	Alpine skiing	SK Sturm Graz	Association football
1999	Hermann Maier	Alpine skiing	Alexandra Meissnitzer	Alpine skiing	Men's relay	Cross-country skiing
2000	Hermann Maier	Alpine skiing	Stephanie Graf	Athletics	Roman Hagara & Hans-Peter Steinacher	Sailing
2001	Hermann Maier	Alpine skiing	Stephanie Graf	Athletics	Men's national team	Ski jumping
2002	Stephan Eberharter	Alpine skiing	Mirna Jukić	Swimming	Men's national team	Nordic combined
2003	Werner Schlager	Table tennis	Michaela Dorfmeister	Alpine skiing	Men's national team	Nordic combined
2004	Markus Rogan	Swimming	Kate Allen	Triathlon	Roman Hagara & Hans-Peter Steinacher	Sailing
2005	Georg Totschnig	Cycling	Renate Götschl	Alpine skiing	Men's national team	Ski jumping
2006	Benjamin Raich	Alpine skiing	Michaela Dorfmeister	Alpine skiing	Men's national team	Nordic combined
2007	Thomas Vanek	Ice hockey	Nicole Hosp	Alpine skiing	Under-20 men's national team	Association football
2008	Thomas Morgenstern	Ski jumping	Mirna Jukić	Swimming	Men's national team	Ski jumping
2009	Wolfgang Loitzl	Ski jumping	Mirna Jukić	Swimming	Men's national team	Ski jumping
2010	Jürgen Melzer	Tennis	Andrea Fischbacher	Alpine skiing	Men's national team	Nordic combined
2011	Thomas Morgenstern	Ski jumping	Elisabeth Görgl	Alpine skiing	Men's national team	Ski jumping
2012	Marcel Hirscher	Alpine skiing	Marlies Schild	Alpine skiing	Men's national team	Ski jumping
2013	David Alaba	Association football	Anna Fenninger	Alpine skiing	Doris Schwaiger & Stefanie Schwaiger	Beach volleyball
2014	David Alaba	Association football	Anna Fenninger	Alpine skiing	Lara Vadlau & Jolanta Ogar	Sailing
2015	Marcel Hirscher	Alpine skiing	Anna Fenninger	Alpine skiing	Men's national team	Association football
2016	Marcel Hirscher	Alpine skiing	Eva-Maria Brem	Alpine skiing	Thomas Zajac & Tanja Frank	Sailing
2017	Marcel Hirscher	Alpine skiing	Anna Gasser	Snowboarding	Women's national team	Association football
2018	Marcel Hirscher	Alpine skiing	Anna Gasser	Snowboarding	FC Red Bull Salzburg	Association football
2019	Marcel Hirscher	Alpine skiing	Vanessa Herzog	Speed skating	FC Red Bull Salzburg	Association football
2020	Dominic Thiem	Tennis	Ivona Dadic	Athletics	FC Red Bull Salzburg	Association football
2021	Vincent Kriechmayr	Alpine skiing	Anna Kiesenhofer	Cycling	FC Red Bull Salzburg	Association football
2022	David Alaba	Association football	Anna Gasser	Snowboarding	FC Red Bull Salzburg	Association football
2023	Felix Gall	Cycling	Eva Pinkelnig	Ski jumping	Men's national football team	Association football
2024	Valentin Bontus	Sailing	Victoria Hudson	Athletics	Lukas Mähr & Lara Vadlau	Sailing
2025	Daniel Tschofenig	Ski jumping	Stephanie Venier	Alpine skiing	Men's national ice hockey team	Ice hockey
2026	Felix Gall	Cycling	Janine Flock	Skeleton	LASK	Association football

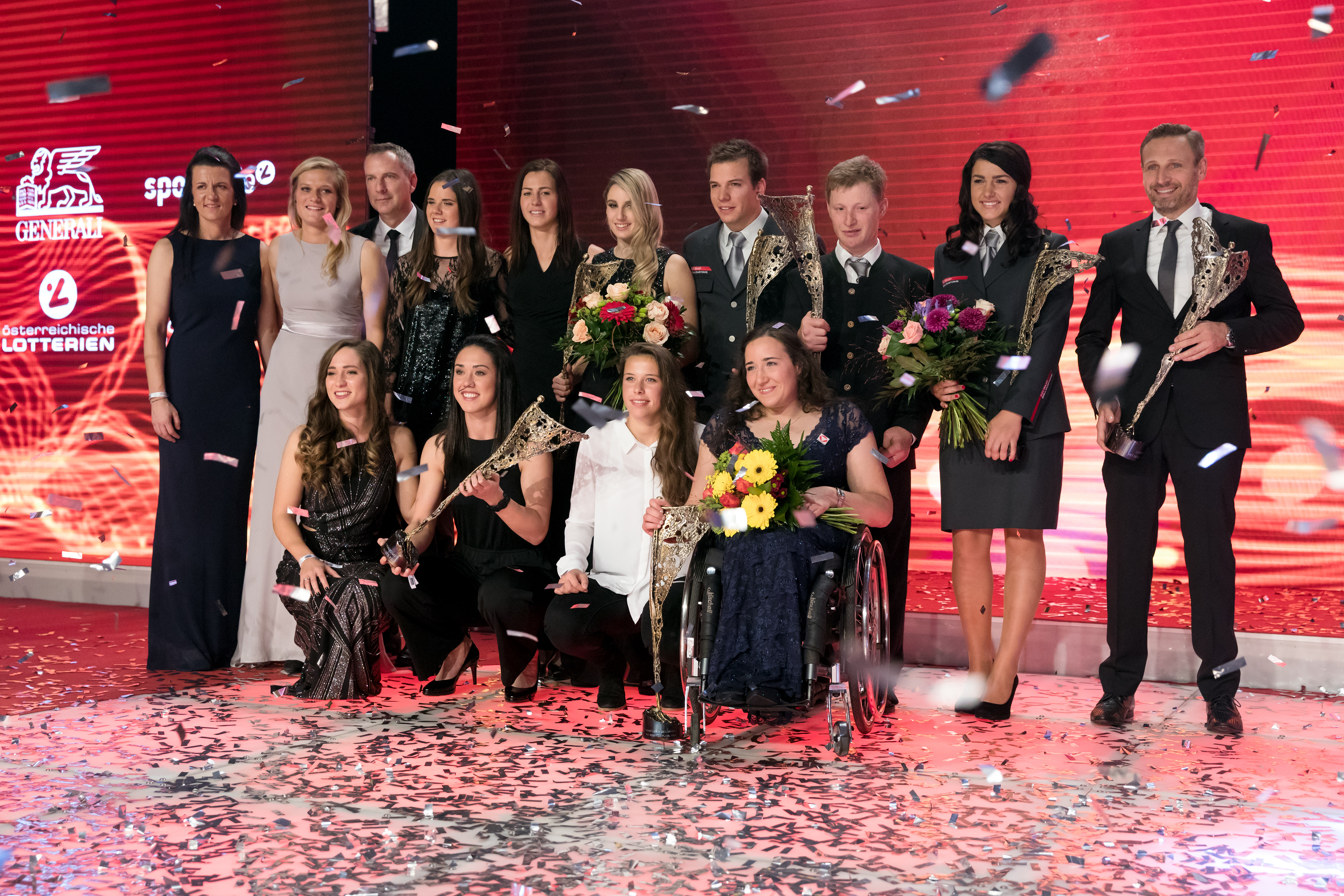
The 2017 winners

== See also ==
- Austrian Footballer of the Year
- Athlete of the Year
- Laureus World Sports Award for Sportsman of the Year (Laureus World Sports Academy)
- Laureus World Sports Award for Sportswoman of the Year
- L'Équipe Champion of Champions Award
