= Roy Stone =

Roy Stone may refer to:

- Roy Stone (general) (1836–1905), American soldier, civil engineer, and inventor
- Sir Roy Stone (civil servant) (1961–2025), British civil servant
- Roy Stone (judoka) (born 1966), English judoka

== See also ==
- Roystonea, a genus of monoecious palms, named for the general
