= Alfonso García =

Alfonso García may refer to:

- Alfonso García (athlete)
- Alfonso García (judoka)
- Alfonso Garcia (footballer)
- Alfonso García González, Mexican politician
