= Terry Watt =

Irish judoka

Personal information
- Nationality: British (Northern Irish)
- Born: 20 December 1946 (age 79)
- Occupation: Judoka
- Height: 179 cm (5 ft 10 in)
- Weight: 80 kg (176 lb)

Sport
- Sport: Judo
- Club: St Columbs, Derry

Terence Watt (born 20 December 1946) is a former international judoka who competed for Ireland at the 1972 Summer Olympics and Northern Ireland at the Commonwealth Games.

== Biography ==
At the 1972 Olympic Games in Munich he participated in the men's middleweight event.

Watt was selected for the 1986 Northern Irish team at the 1986 Commonwealth Games in Edinburgh, Scotland. The judo competition was a demonstration sport for the Games and Watt competed in the 86kg middleweight category.

Four years later Watt was selected by the 1990 Northern Irish team at the 1990 Commonwealth Games in Auckland, New Zealand, where he participated in the 95 kg half-lightweight and open categories.
