= Billy Cusack =

Scottish judoka

Personal information
- Nationality: British (Scottish)
- Born: 23 May 1966 (age 60) Glasgow, Scotland
- Occupation: Judoka

Sport
- Sport: Judo
- Weight class: lightweight
- Events: Half-lightweight; Lightweight
Medal record
Representing Scotland
Commonwealth Games
Bronze medal – third place	1990 Auckland	71kg lightweight

Profile at external databases
- JudoInside.com: 2278

William Scott Cusack (born 23 May 1966) is a Scottish judoka who represented Great Britain in the Olympics.

== Early and personal life ==
Cusack was born in Glasgow, Scotland. When he competed in the Olympics, he was 5 ft 8.5 in (174.0 cm) tall, and weighed 163 lb (74 kg). He was married to 1982 U52 world champion judoka Loretta Doyle and his sister is former international judoka Karen Cusack. His son Scott Cusack is also a judoka.

== Judo career ==
Cusack was a six times champion of Great Britain, winning lightweight (lw) and half-middleweight (hmw) divisions at the British Judo Championships in 1988, 1990, 1991, 1992, 1993 (hmw) and 1994.

Cusack's sports club was Edinburgh. In 1990, he won the US Open Colorado Springs in the U71 weight class as well as the 1994 Scottish Senior Championships in the U78 weight class.

Cusack represented the Scottish team at the 1990 Commonwealth Games in Auckland, New Zealand, where he competed in the 71 kg lightweight category. He won a bronze medal after defeating Steve Corkin of New Zealand, Sandeep Byala of India and James Hallett of Australia. His gold medal chances were ended by Roy Stone.

Cusack competed for Great Britain at the 1992 Summer Olympics in Barcelona, at the age of 26, in Judo--Men's Lightweight, and came in tied for 18th. He was awarded his 7th Dan on 29 October 2015 by the British Judo Association.

== Coaching career ==
Cusack is Director of Coaching at Edinburgh Judo, and in 1999 was named UK Coach of the Year, receiving the Mussabini Medal. He assisted Graeme Randall, who won the -81 kg world title in Birmingham. He coached his son Scott to the bronze medal at the 2026 Commonwealth Games.
