= Densign White =

British judoka (born 1961)

Densign White MBE
Personal information
- Full name: Densign Emmanuel White
- Nationality: British
- Born: 21 December 1961 (age 64) Wolverhampton, West Midlands, England
- Occupation: Judoka

Sport
- Country: Great Britain
- Sport: Judo
- Weight class: ‍–‍86 kg
- Club: University of Wolverhampton

Achievements and titles
- Olympic Games: 5th (1984, 1988)
- World Champ.: (bronze) (1987)
- European Champ.: (silver) (1987, 1988)
- Commonwealth Games: (gold) (1990)
Medal record
Men's judo
Representing Great Britain
World Championships
| Bronze medal – third place | 1987 Essen | ‍–‍86 kg |
European Championships
| Silver medal – second place | 1987 Paris | ‍–‍86 kg |
| Silver medal – second place | 1988 Pamplona | ‍–‍86 kg |
| Bronze medal – third place | 1990 Frankfurt | ‍–‍86 kg |
European Junior Championships
| Bronze medal – third place | 1980 Lisbon | ‍–‍78 kg |
European Cadet Championships
| Bronze medal – third place | 1978 Miskolc Hungary | ‍–‍68 kg |
Representing England
Commonwealth Games
| Gold medal – first place | 1990 Auckland | ‍–‍86 kg |

Profile at external databases
- IJF: 8542
- JudoInside.com: 5016
- Updated on 9 July 2024

Densign White MBE (born 21 December 1961) is a British male retired judoka. White competed at the 1984, 1988 and the 1992 Summer Olympics.

== Judo career ==
White won the first of his nine British titles after winning the light-middleweight division at the British Judo Championships in 1980. He stepped up in weight the following year to claim a second title and then completed three in a row when reverting back to -78 kg in 1982. After settling at middleweight, he won a fourth title in 1983 before he was selected to represent Great Britain at the 1984 Summer Olympics. He competed in the men's 86 kg division, where he reached the quarter final and repechage final but lost to Walter Carmona in the bronze medal play off. In 1986, he won the silver medal in the 86 kg weight category at the judo demonstration sport event as part of the 1986 Commonwealth Games.

A fifth and sixth British title in 1985 and 1987 was followed by a bronze medal at the 1987 World Judo Championships and a silver medal at the 1987 European Judo Championships. In 1988, he won British title number seven and repeated his success at the 1988 European Championships in Pamplona by winning another silver medal. It was also during 1988 that he went to his second Olympic Games, competing in the men's -86kg class and once again just failed to secure a medal after losing in the repechage final.

He won an eighth British title in 1989 and secure a bronze medal at the 1990 European Judo Championships in Frankfurt. He also represented England and won a gold medal in the 86 kg middleweight category, at the 1990 Commonwealth Games in Auckland, New Zealand. In 1989 he won his ninth and final British title before represting Great Britain for a third time at the Olympic Games. In Barcelona, he competed in the men's 86kg category, failing to progress from Pool A.

== Personal life ==
White is married to Tessa Sanderson. He was appointed Member of the Order of the British Empire (MBE) in the 2020 Birthday Honours for services to diversity in sport as chair of Sporting Equals.
