= Jonathan Gavin =

Scottish judoka

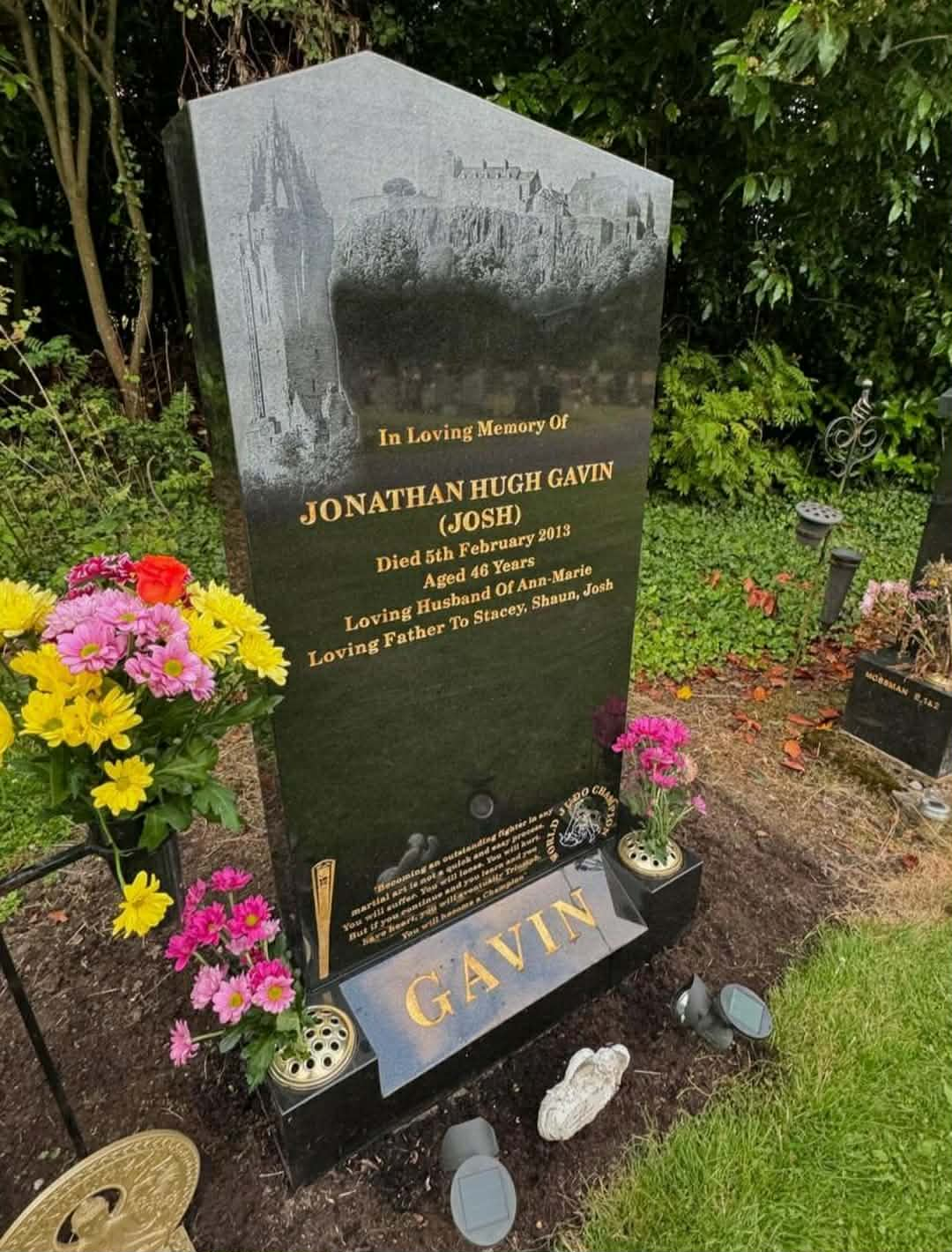
- Gavin's Grave in Sunnyside Cemetery in Sauchie

Personal information
- Nickname: Josh Gavin
- Born: Jonathan Hugh Gavin; April 26, 1966 Airthrey Castle Stirling, Scotland
- Died: February 5, 2013 (aged 46) Forth Valley Royal Hospital, Scotland
- Resting place: Sunnyside Cemetery in (Sauchie)
- Home town: Tullibody and Alloa
- Occupations: Judoka; martial artist; model
- Years active: 1974–2013
- Height: 5 ft 9 in (175 cm)
- Weight: 12 st 6 lb (174 lb; 79 kg)
- Spouse: Anne Gavin 1992–2013
- Children: 3, including Josh Gavin

Sport
- Country: Scotland
- Sport: Judo Tennis Table Tennis Badminton Squash (sport) Wrestling Mixed Martial Arts
- Weight class: –71 kg, –86 kg
- Rank: 6th dan black belt

Achievements and titles
- World Champ.: (gold) (2001)
Medal record
Men's judo
Representing Scotland
World Masters Championships
Gold medal – first place	2001 Phoenix Arizona	-81kg
Scottish Senior Championships
Gold medal – first place	1994 Edinburgh	-86kg
Gold medal – first place	1995 Edinburgh	-78kg
Gold medal – first place	1996 Glasgow	-86kg
Gold medal – first place	1997 Glasgow	-81kg
British Trials
Silver medal – second place	1994 Edinburgh	-78kg
Bronze medal – third place	1995 Bangor Castle	-78kg
Commonwealth Judo Championships
Bronze medal – third place	1988 Coleraine	-78kg

Profile at external databases
- JudoInside.com: 11286
- Updated on 12 October 2026

Jonathan Hugh Gavin (April 26, 1966 – February 5, 2013) was a Scottish judoka best known for winning the bronze medal in the (‍–‍78 kg) division at the 1988 Commonwealth Judo Championships.

== Biography ==
Jonathan Hugh Gavin was born on April 26, 1966. Gavin had been involved in martial arts since he was eight years.

In 1988, he earned a bronze medal at the 1988 Commonwealth Championships in Coleraine.

Gavin won the Scottish Senior Championships from 1994 to 1997 and won bronze and silver medals in British Trials in 1994 and 1995. He was the World Masters Judo Championships in Phoenix, Arizona in 2001 at the age of 35.

In 2010 he was diagnosed with a brain tumour, underwent an operation, and continued to undergo treatment. On 13 June 2012, Gavin carried the Olympic torch through Cumbernauld, Scotland.

Gavin died from brain tumour on 5 February 2013. He was laid to rest at Sunnyside Cemetery in Sauchie.

== Sport achievements ==
Year	Event	Sport	Division	Result
1988	Commonwealth Championships Coleraine	Judo	Men –78 kg	3rd place, bronze medalist(s)
1994	Scottish Senior Championships Edinburgh	Judo	Men –86 kg	1st place, gold medalist(s)
1994	British Trials Edinburgh	Judo	Men –78 kg	2nd place, silver medalist(s)
1995	Scottish Senior Championships Edinburgh	Judo	Men –78 kg	1st place, gold medalist(s)
1995	British Trials Bangor Castle	Judo	Men –78 kg	3rd place, bronze medalist(s)
1996	Scottish Senior Championships Glasgow	Judo	Men –86 kg	1st place, gold medalist(s)
1997	Scottish Senior Championships Glasgow	Judo	Men –81 kg	1st place, gold medalist(s)
2001	World Masters Championships Arizona	Judo	Men –81 kg	1st place, gold medalist(s)
