= Mochida =

Mochida (written: 持田) is a Japanese surname. Notable people with the surname include:

- Kaori Mochida (持田 香織, born 1978), Japanese singer
- Masanari Mochida (born 1972), Japanese slalom canoeist
- Moriji Mochida (持田 盛二, 1885–1974), Japanese kendoka
- Ryunosuke Mochida (持田 龍之介, born 1993), Japanese weightlifter
- Tatsuto Mochida (持田 達人, born 1965), Japanese judoka

== See also ==
- Mochida Pharmaceutical, a Japanese pharmaceutical company
- Mochida Station, a railway station in Gyōda, Saitama, Japan
