= Loretta Doyle =

British judoka (born 1963)

Personal information
- Full name: Loretta Cusack-Doyle
- Born: 12 July 1963 (age 63)
- Occupation: Judoka
- Spouse: Billy Cusack (divorced)

Sport
- Country: Great Britain
- Sport: Judo
- Weight class: ‍–‍52 kg, ‍–‍56 kg
- Rank: 9th dan black belt

Achievements and titles
- World Champ.: (gold) (1982)
- European Champ.: (gold) (1983, 1992)
- Commonwealth Games: (gold) (1990)
Medal record
Women's judo
Representing Great Britain
World Championships
Gold medal – first place	1982 Paris	‍–‍52 kg
Bronze medal – third place	1980 New York	‍–‍56 kg
European Championships
Gold medal – first place	1983 Genoa	‍–‍52 kg
Gold medal – first place	1992 Paris	‍–‍52 kg
Silver medal – second place	1981 Madrid	‍–‍52 kg
Silver medal – second place	1982 Oslo	‍–‍52 kg
Silver medal – second place	1991 Prague	‍–‍52 kg
Bronze medal – third place	1980 Udine	‍–‍56 kg
Bronze medal – third place	1986 London	‍–‍52 kg
Representing Scotland
Commonwealth Games
Gold medal – first place	1990 Auckland	‍–‍56 kg
Silver medal – second place	1986 Edinburgh	‍–‍52 kg

Profile at external databases
- IJF: 14988
- JudoInside.com: 4924
- Updated on 3 February 2025

Loretta Doyle (also known by her married name Cusack, born 12 July 1963) is a Scottish judoka who won the under-52 kg event at the 1982 World Championships, and the under-56 kg event at the 1990 Commonwealth Games. Doyle also won the European Championships in 1983 and 1992.

== Career ==
Doyle started judo at the age of 10, and three years later, she joined the British Judo team. Doyle competed at the inaugural World Judo Championships for women in New York 1980. She was one of seven judoka at the event, and won a bronze medal. She came third at the 1980 European Championships, and second at the 1981 and 1982 European Championships. She won the under-52 kg title at the 1982 World Championships. Doyle won the under-52 kg event at the 1983 European Championships in Genoa, Italy. Doyle had to pay her own costs to compete at the 1984 World Championships; she had to borrow the money from her father. In the Championships, Doyle suffered a separated shoulder and had to be taken to hospital.

Doyle came second at the 1986 Commonwealth Games in Edinburgh, Scotland where judo was a demonstration sport. That year, she lost the British Open Championships final to Sharon Rendle. Rendle was chosen instead of Doyle for the 1986 World Championships. That year, Doyle also came third at the 1986 European Championships in London. Doyle lost in the first round of the 1989 European Championships.

Doyle won the lightweight event (under-56 kg) at the 1990 Commonwealth Games, beating Australian Suzanne Williams in the final. It was Scotland's first medal in Judo at the Commonwealth Games. She came second in the under 52 kg event at the 1991 European Championships, losing to Jessica Gal in the final. Doyle won the under-52 kg event at the 1992 European Championships in Paris, France. Doyle was not selected for the 1992 Summer Olympics. In addition to her international success, she won eight British titles at the British Judo Championships.

After retiring, Doyle worked as a coach for the British Judo Association. In that role, Doyle coached Sally Conway. In 2019, she set up the Loretta Doyle Judo Foundation, to help fund young judo enthusiasts.

== Personal life ==
Doyle was married to Billy Cusack, who won a bronze medal at the 1990 Commonwealth Games in the men's lightweight judo event; the pair were married before Doyle's appearance at the 1986 Commonwealth Games. The pair have two children, and Doyle found out that she was first pregnant when she went for a medical examination prior to the 1992 Olympic selection. She said she was disappointed not to be selected, but "delighted" that she was pregnant. The pair are now divorced. Their son Scott Cusack is also a judoka and was a bronze medalist at the 2026 Commonwealth Games, where she worked as judo manager for the Games.
