= Michael Bazynski =

German judoka (born 1958)

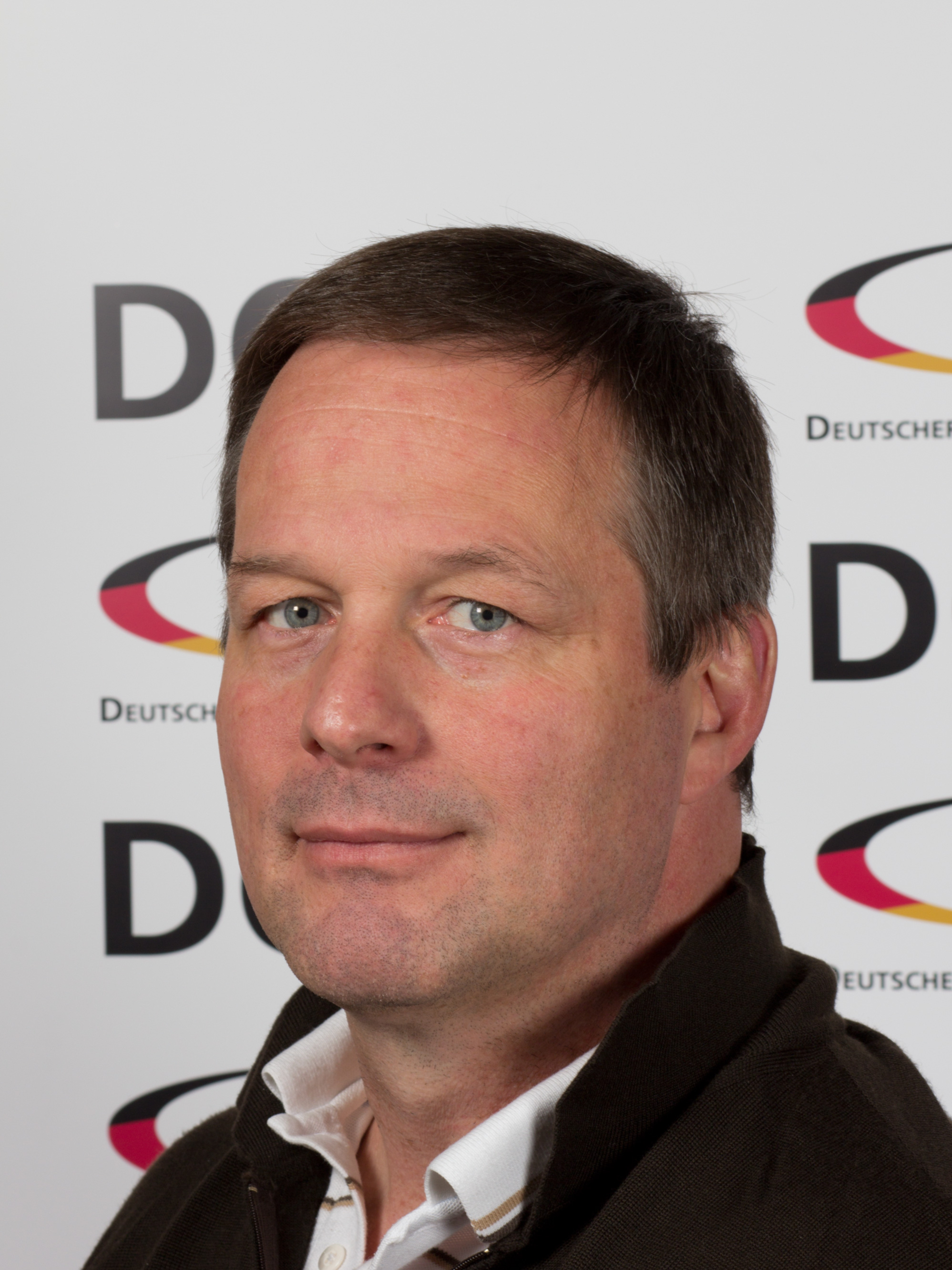
- Michael Bazynski in 2012

Personal information
- Born: 12 October 1958 (age 67) Bochum, Germany
- Occupation: Judoka

Sport
- Country: West Germany
- Sport: Judo
- Weight class: ‍–‍86 kg
- Rank: 8th dan black belt

Achievements and titles
- Olympic Games: R64 (1988)
- World Champ.: R16 (1987)
- European Champ.: (silver) (1985)
Medal record
Men's judo
Representing West Germany
European Championships
Silver medal – second place	1985 Hamar	‍–‍86 kg
Summer Universiade
Bronze medal – third place	1985 Kobe	‍–‍86 kg

Profile at external databases
- IJF: 36357
- JudoInside.com: 6427
- Updated on 10 March 2023

Michael Bazynski (born 12 October 1958) is a German judoka. He competed in the men's middleweight event at the 1988 Summer Olympics.
