= Kim Seung-gyu (judoka) =

South Korean judoka (born 1967)

Personal information
- Nationality: South Korean
- Born: 10 August 1967 (age 57)

Sport
- Sport: Judo

Kim Seung-gyu (born 10 August 1967) is a South Korean judoka. He competed in the men's middleweight event at the 1988 Summer Olympics.
