= Stanko Lopatić =

Yugoslav judoka (born 1956)

Personal information
- Nationality: Yugoslav
- Born: 21 January 1956 (age 69)

Sport
- Sport: Judo

Stanko Lopatić (born 21 January 1956) is a Yugoslav judoka. He competed in the men's middleweight event at the 1984 Summer Olympics.
