= Donna Hilton =

New Zealand judoka

Personal information
- Full name: Donna Maree Hilton
- Born: 28 February 1968 (age 58) Auckland, New Zealand
- Occupation: Judoka

Sport
- Sport: Judo
Medal record
Women's judo
Representing New Zealand
Oceania Championships
Gold medal – first place	1992 Wellington	-48 kg
Silver medal – second place	1990 Papeete	-48 kg
Bronze medal – third place	1983 Noumea	-48 kg
Commonwealth Championships
Bronze medal – third place	1992 Cardiff	-48 kg

Profile at external databases
- IJF: 53737
- JudoInside.com: 10600

Donna Maree Hilton (born 28 February 1968) is a former judoka from New Zealand. She represented New Zealand at the 1990 Commonwealth Games in Auckland, New Zealand, and at the 1992 Summer Olympics in Barcelona, Spain. Also known as Donna Burger, from her marriage to Ralf Burger, she was New Zealand's first female Olympic judoka.

She participated in the World Championships in 1991, 1993, and 1995, and the World Cup in 1995. Competing in the -48 kg weight class, she finished third at the Commonwealth Championships in 1992 and won three medals at the Oceania Championships between 1983 and 1992.
