= Scott Cusack =

British judoka (born 1996)

Personal information
- Born: 26 January 1996 (age 30)
- Occupation: Judoka

Sport
- Country: Great Britain
- Sport: Judo
- Weight class: ‍–‍90 kg

Achievements and titles
- Commonwealth Games: (bronze) (2026)
Medal record
Men's judo
Representing Scotland
Commonwealth Games
Bronze medal – third place	2026 Glasgow	‍–‍90 kg

Profile at external databases
- IJF: 30171
- JudoInside.com: 94645
- Updated on 4 August 2026

Scott Cusack (born 26 January 1996) is a British judoka. He was a medalist at the 2026 Commonwealth Games in Glasgow, representing Scotland.

== Career ==
From Ayrshire, Cusack was educated at Largs Academy. He played rugby union for Ayr Rugby Club and Ardrossan Accies before focussing on judoka from the age of 18 years-old. From a Judo family; his parents Loretta Doyle and Billy Cusack were both medalists at the 1990 Commonwealth Games.

Trained by his father, in 2023 he won gold at the British Judo Championships defeating top seed Lachlan Moorhead. He became British Champion again with gold in the -90kg category at the 2025 British Championships in December 2025.

In 2026, Cusack won a bronze medal competing in the 90kg division for Scotland at the 2026 Commonwealth Games in Glasgow.
