= Ann Hughes (judoka) =

British judoka (born 1960)

Personal information
- Nationality: British (English)
- Born: 21 January 1960 (age 66)
- Occupation: Judoka

Sport
- Country: Great Britain
- Sport: Judo
- Weight class: ‍–‍56 kg, ‍–‍61 kg

Achievements and titles
- Olympic Games: 5th (1988)
- World Champ.: (1986)
- European Champ.: (gold) (1981, 1983)
- Commonwealth Games: (gold) (1986)
Medal record
Women's judo
Representing Great Britain
World Championships
Gold medal – first place	1986 Maastricht	‍–‍56 kg
Silver medal – second place	1989 Belgrade	‍–‍56 kg
Bronze medal – third place	1987 Essen	‍–‍56 kg
European Championships
Gold medal – first place	1981 Madrid	‍–‍61 kg
Gold medal – first place	1983 Genoa	‍–‍61 kg
Silver medal – second place	1987 Paris	‍–‍56 kg
Bronze medal – third place	1984 Pirmasens	‍–‍61 kg
Bronze medal – third place	1985 Landskrona	‍–‍61 kg
Bronze medal – third place	1986 London	‍–‍56 kg
Representing England
Commonwealth Games
Gold medal – first place	1986 Edinburgh	‍–‍56 kg
Bronze medal – third place	1990 Auckland	‍–‍56 kg

Profile at external databases
- IJF: 53846
- JudoInside.com: 4946
- Updated on 9 July 2024

Ann Hughes (born 1960), is a female former judoka who competed for Great Britain and England.

== Judo career ==
Hughes won a gold medal at the 1986 World Championships, a bronze in 1987 and a silver in 1989. She represented England at the 1990 Commonwealth Games in Auckland, New Zealand and won a bronze medal in the lightweight (56 kg) category of the judo competition. In 1986, she also won the gold medal in the 56 kg weight category at the judo demonstration sport event as part of the 1986 Commonwealth Games.

She is also a three times champion of Great Britain, winning the light-middleweight division at the British Judo Championships in 1982 and 1982 and the open class in 1984.
