= Andrew Richardson (judoka) =

Australian judoka

Personal information
- Nationality: Australian
- Born: 4 November 1955 (age 70)

Sport
- Sport: Judo

Andrew Richardson (born 4 November 1955) is an Australian judoka. He competed in the men's middleweight event at the 1984 Summer Olympics. In 1986, he won the bronze medal in the 86 kg weight category at the judo demonstration sport event as part of the 1986 Commonwealth Games.
