= Sharon Mills =

British judoka (born 1970)

Personal information
- Nationality: British (English)
- Born: 11 February 1970 (age 56)
- Occupation: Judoka

Sport
- Sport: Judo
- Weight class: –66 kg
Medal record
Representing England
Commonwealth Games
Gold medal – first place	1990 Auckland	66kg middleweight

Sharon Mills (born 11 February 1970), is a female former judoka who competed for England.

== Judo career ==
Mills represented England and won a gold medal in the 66 kg middleweight category, at the 1990 Commonwealth Games in Auckland, New Zealand. In 1991, she became champion of Great Britain, winning the middleweight division at the British Judo Championships.
