= Seiki Nose =

Japanese judoka

Personal information
- Born: 10 August 1952 (age 73)
- Occupation: Judoka

Sport
- Country: Japan
- Sport: Judo
- Weight class: ‍–‍86 kg

Achievements and titles
- Olympic Games: (bronze) (1984)
- World Champ.: (silver) (1981)
Medal record
Men's judo
Representing Japan
Olympic Games
Bronze medal – third place	1984 Los Angeles	‍–‍86 kg
World Championships
Silver medal – second place	1981 Maastricht	‍–‍86 kg
Bronze medal – third place	1983 Moscow	‍–‍86 kg

Profile at external databases
- IJF: 7341
- JudoInside.com: 5452
- Updated on 19 June 2023

Seiki Nose (野瀬 清喜, Nose Seiki; born 10 August 1952) is a Japanese judoka who competed in the 1984 Summer Olympics. Nose was world finalist in Maastricht 1981 and won bronze in Moscow 1983. Nose won five consecutive All Japan titles from 1980 to 1984; won the US Open and Hungarian Open titles; and in 1981, won the Kano Cup in Tokyo.
