= Seo Hyang-soon =

South Korean archer (born 1967)

Medal record

Women's archery

Representing South Korea

Olympic Games
Gold medal – first place	1984 Los Angeles	Individual

World Championships
Silver medal – second place	1985 Seoul	Team

- Seo Hyang-soon
- Hangul: 서향순
- Hanja: 徐香順
- RR: Seo Hyangsun
- MR: Sŏ Hyangsun

Seo Hyang-soon (Korean: 서향순; born July 8, 1967) is a female South Korean archer and Olympic champion. She competed at the 1984 Summer Olympics in Los Angeles, where she won an individual gold medal at the age of seventeen. She became Korea's first female gold medalist, and its fifth gold medalist overall.

She moved to the United States in 2004, where she teaches Olympic Recurve archery at her own archery school (HSS Sports Academy) in Irvine, California. Her husband is Park Kyung-ho, who won a gold medal in judo at the 1986 Asian Games. They have three children, their eldest daughter, Park Seong-min (박성민) is a professional golfer.
