= Chang Shou-chung =

Taiwanese judoka

Personal information
- Full name: 張守忠
- Nationality: Taiwanese
- Born: 15 January 1955 (age 70)

Sport
- Sport: Judo

Chang Shou-chung (Chinese: 張守忠; pinyin: Zhāng Shǒu-zhōng; born 15 January 1955) is a Taiwanese judoka. He competed in the men's middleweight event at the 1984 Summer Olympics.
