= Brent Cooper =

New Zealand judoka

Personal information
- Full name: Arthur David Brent Cooper
- Born: 14 September 1960 (age 65) Ōtaki, New Zealand
- Height: 1.70 m (5 ft 7 in)
- Weight: 65 kg (143 lb)

Sport
- Country: New Zealand
- Sport: Judo
- Rank: 7th dan
- Event: Half lightweight
Medal record
Representing New Zealand
Men's judo
Commonwealth Games
Gold medal – first place	1990 Auckland	Half lightweight

Arthur David Brent Cooper (born 14 September 1960) is a New Zealand judoka and judo administrator. He competed in the half lightweight event at the 1990 Commonwealth Games where he won a gold medal. He also competed at the 1988 Olympic Games where he finished fifth. He later became head coach of Judo New Zealand.
