= Carl Finney =

British judoka

Personal information
- Nationality: British (English)
- Born: 27 June 1965 (age 61) Lancashire, England

Sport
- Sport: Judo
Medal record
Judo
Representing England
Commonwealth Games
Gold medal – first place	1990 Auckland	60kg extra-lightweight

Carl Finney (born 1965), is a male former judoka who competed for England.

== Judo career ==
In 1986, Finney won the gold medal in the 60 kg weight category at the judo demonstration sport event as part of the 1986 Commonwealth Games.

Finney represented England and won a gold medal in the 60 kg extra-lightweight category, at the 1990 Commonwealth Games in Auckland, New Zealand.

He is a three times champion of Great Britain, winning the British Judo Championships in 1987, 1988 and 1989.
