= Mark Adshead =

British judoka (born 1963)

Personal information
- Nationality: British (English)
- Born: 4 April 1963 (age 63) Altrincham, Greater Manchester
- Height: 1.73 m (5 ft 8 in)
- Weight: 65 kg (143 lb)

Sport
- Sport: Judo
- Club: Kendal Judo Centre
Medal record
Judo
Representing England
Commonwealth Games
Bronze medal – third place	1990 Auckland	65kg half-lightweight

Mark Adshead (born 4 April 1963) is a British retired judoka.

== Judo career ==
In 1986, he won the bronze medal in the 65kg weight category at the judo demonstration sport event as part of the 1986 Commonwealth Games. In 1987, he became a champion of Great Britain, winning the British Judo Championships featherweight category.

He competed in the 1988 Summer Olympics. He represented England and won a bronze medal in the 65 kg half-lightweight division, at the 1990 Commonwealth Games in Auckland, New Zealand.
