= Majemite Omagbaluwaje =

Nigerian judoka (born 1969)

Medal record

Men's judo

Commonwealth Games
Silver medal – second place	1990 Auckland	71 kg
Bronze medal – third place	1990 Auckland	Open

All-Africa Games
Gold medal – first place	1999 Johannesburg	81 kg
Bronze medal – third place	1999 Johannesburg	Open

Majemite Omagbaluwaje (born 10 June 1969) is a Nigerian judoka. He competed at three Olympic Games.

== Achievements ==
1991 !All African Games	Cairo	71 kg	
1999	All-Africa Games	1st	Half middleweight (81 kg)
1999	All-Africa Games	3rd	Open class
1990	Commonwealth Games	2nd	Lightweight (71 kg)
1990	Commonwealth Games	3rd	Open class
1989	World Judo Championships	7th	Lightweight (71 kg)
