= Robert Berland =

American Olympic judoka

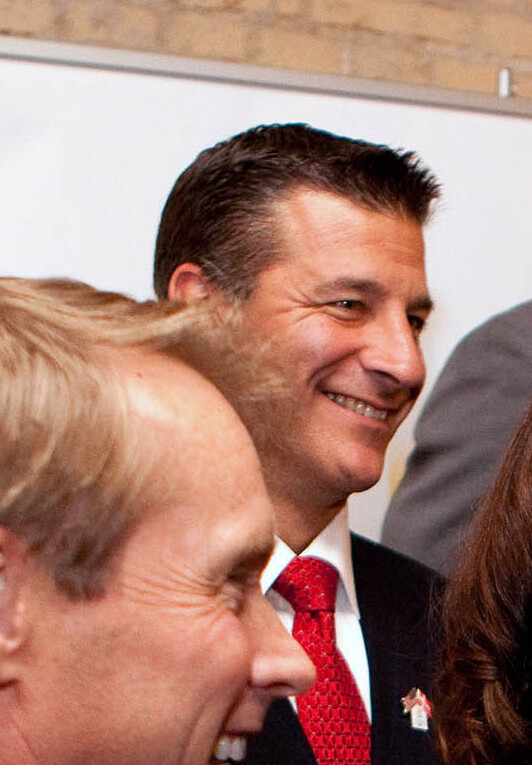
- Berland in 2009

Personal information
- Born: November 5, 1961 (age 64) Chicago, Illinois, U.S.
- Occupation: Judoka

Sport
- Country: United States
- Sport: Judo
- Weight class: ‍–‍86 kg

Achievements and titles
- Olympic Games: (silver) (1984)
- World Champ.: (bronze) (1983)
- Pan American Champ.: (1986)
Medal record
Men's judo
Representing United States
Olympic Games
Silver medal – second place	1984 Los Angeles	‍–‍86 kg
World Championships
Bronze medal – third place	1983 Moscow	‍–‍86 kg
Pan American Games
Silver medal – second place	1983 Caracas	‍–‍86 kg
Pan American Championships
Silver medal – second place	1986 Salinas Puerto Rico	‍–‍95 kg
Pan American Cadet Championships
Bronze medal – third place	1976 Mexico City	‍–‍56 kg

Profile at external databases
- IJF: 53763
- JudoInside.com: 5997
- Updated on June 19, 2023

Robert "Bobby" Berland (born November 5, 1961, in Chicago, Illinois) is an American Olympic judoka.

== Biography ==
He competed in the 1984 Summer Olympics and in the 1988 Summer Olympics.

Berland is Jewish. In 1984 he won the silver in the Judo at the under 86 kg (Middleweight) division. He was the first American and graduate of Mather High School to receive an Olympic silver medal in judo.

Berland also won a bronze medal in the 1983 World Judo Championships.

== See also ==
- List of select Jewish judokas
