= Chiu Heng-an =

Taiwanese judoka

Personal information
- Full name: 邱 恆安, Pinyin: Qiū Héng'ān
- Nationality: Taiwanese
- Born: 19 December 1966 (age 58)

Sport
- Sport: Judo

Chiu Heng-an (born 19 December 1966) is a Taiwanese judoka. He competed in the men's middleweight event at the 1988 Summer Olympics.
