= José Fuentes (judoka) =

Puerto Rican judoka (born 1960)

Personal information
- Nationality: Puerto Rican
- Born: 26 May 1960 (age 66)

Sport
- Sport: Judo

José Fuentes (born 26 May 1960) is a Puerto Rican judoka. He competed in the men's middleweight event at the 1984 Summer Olympics.
