= Vladimir Shestakov =

Russian judoka

Personal information
- Born: 30 January 1961 (age 65)
- Occupation: Judoka

Sport
- Country: Soviet Union
- Sport: Judo
- Weight class: ‍–‍78 kg, ‍–‍86 kg

Achievements and titles
- Olympic Games: (silver) (1988)
- World Champ.: (bronze) (1985)
- European Champ.: 7th (1992)
Medal record
Men's judo
Representing Soviet Union
Olympic Games
Silver medal – second place	1988 Seoul	‍–‍86 kg
World Championships
Bronze medal – third place	1985 Seoul	‍–‍78 kg
European Junior Championships
Silver medal – second place	1979 Edinburgh	‍–‍78 kg

Profile at external databases
- IJF: 53804
- JudoInside.com: 5737
- Updated on 18 June 2023

Vladimir Zaripzyanovich Shestakov (Russian: Владимир Зарипзянович Шестаков, born 30 January 1961) is a Soviet judoka who competed for the Soviet Union at the 1988 Summer Olympics, where he won the silver medal in the middleweight class.
