= Josateki Basalusalu =

Fijian judoka

Personal information
- Nationality: Fijian
- Born: 19 February 1955 (age 70)

Sport
- Sport: Judo

Josateki Basalusalu (born 19 February 1955) is a Fijian judoka. He competed in the men's middleweight event at the 1988 Summer Olympics.
