= Sharon Lee (judoka) =

British judoka (born 1963)

Personal information
- Nationality: British
- Born: 13 March 1963 (age 63) Birmingham, West Midlands, England
- Occupation: Judoka
- Children: Cherelle

Sport
- Sport: Judo
- Club: Great Barr
Medal record
Representing Great Britain
World Championships
Silver medal – second place	1989 Belgrade	Open
Representing England
Commonwealth Games
Gold medal – first place	1990 Auckland	Open
Gold medal – first place	1990 Auckland	+72kg

Profile at external databases
- JudoInside.com: 2307

Sharon Denise Lee (born 13 March 1963) is a retired British judoka.

== Judo career ==
Lee competed in the women's heavyweight event at the 1992 Summer Olympics. In 1986, she won the bronze medal in the +72 kg weight category at the judo demonstration sport event as part of the 1986 Commonwealth Games. and four years later represented England, winning two gold medals in the Open category and the +72 kg heavyweight category, at the 1990 Commonwealth Games in Auckland, New Zealand.
