= Fabien Canu =

French judoka (born 1960)

Personal information
- Born: 23 April 1960 (age 66) Saint-Valery-en-Caux, France
- Occupation: Judoka

Sport
- Country: France
- Sport: Judo
- Weight class: ‍–‍86 kg

Achievements and titles
- Olympic Games: 5th (1984, 1988)
- World Champ.: (1987, 1989)
- European Champ.: (gold) (1987, 1988, 1989)
Medal record
Men's judo
Representing France
World Championships
Gold medal – first place	1987 Essen	‍–‍86 kg
Gold medal – first place	1989 Belgrade	‍–‍86 kg
Silver medal – second place	1983 Moscow	‍–‍86 kg
Bronze medal – third place	1985 Seoul	‍–‍86 kg
European Championships
Gold medal – first place	1987 Paris	‍–‍86 kg
Gold medal – first place	1988 Pamplona	‍–‍86 kg
Gold medal – first place	1989 Helsinki	‍–‍86 kg
Bronze medal – third place	1986 Belgrade	‍–‍86 kg
Bronze medal – third place	1990 Frankfurt	‍–‍86 kg
European Cadet Championships
Bronze medal – third place	1977 Berlin	‍–‍75 kg
Summer Universiade
Gold medal – first place	1982 Jyväskylä	‍–‍86 kg
Bronze medal – third place	1980 Wrocław	‍–‍78 kg

Profile at external databases
- IJF: 26407
- JudoInside.com: 5070
- Updated on 9 July 2024

Fabien Canu (born 23 April 1960) is a French judoka. He competed at the 1984 Summer Olympics and the 1988 Summer Olympics.
