= Charles Griffith (judoka) =

Venezuelan judoka (born 1963)

Personal information
- Nationality: Venezuelan
- Born: 18 September 1963 (age 62)

Sport
- Sport: Judo
Medal record
Representing Venezuela
Pan American Games
Silver medal – second place	1987 Indianapolis	Middleweight
Bronze medal – third place	1991 Havana	Half-heavyweight
Bronze medal – third place	1991 Havana	Open class
Central American and Caribbean Games
Silver medal – second place	1986 Santiago	Half-middleweight
Silver medal – second place	1986 Santiago	Open class
Bronze medal – third place	1990 Mexico City	Middleweight
Bronze medal – third place	1993 Ponce	Half-heavyweight

Charles Densil Griffith (born 18 February 1963) is a Venezuelan judoka. He competed in the men's middleweight event at the 1988 Summer Olympics.
