= Akinobu Osako =

Japanese judoka (born 1960)

Personal information
- Born: 27 November 1960 (age 65) Miyazaki, Japan
- Occupation: Judoka

Sport
- Country: Japan
- Sport: Judo

Achievements and titles
- Olympic Games: (bronze) (1988)
- World Champ.: 9th (1989)
Medal record
Men's judo
Representing Japan
Olympic Games
Bronze medal – third place	1988 Seoul	‍–‍86 kg

Profile at external databases
- IJF: 7263
- JudoInside.com: 5460
- Updated on 18 June 2023

Akinobu Osako (大迫明伸, Ōsako Akinobu) (born 27 November 1960) is a retired judoka from Japan, who represented his native country at the 1988 Summer Olympics in Seoul, South Korea. There he won a bronze medal in the men's middleweight division (‍–‍86 kg), alongside Ben Spijkers from the Netherlands.

Osako was born in Nishimorokata District, Miyazaki and began judo at the age of a junior high student. He entered noble Asahi Kasei of the judo after graduation in Tenri University. In the days of active play, he was good at Seoi Nage, Tai Otoshi and Uchi Mata.
