= Peter Seisenbacher =

Austrian judoka (born 1960)

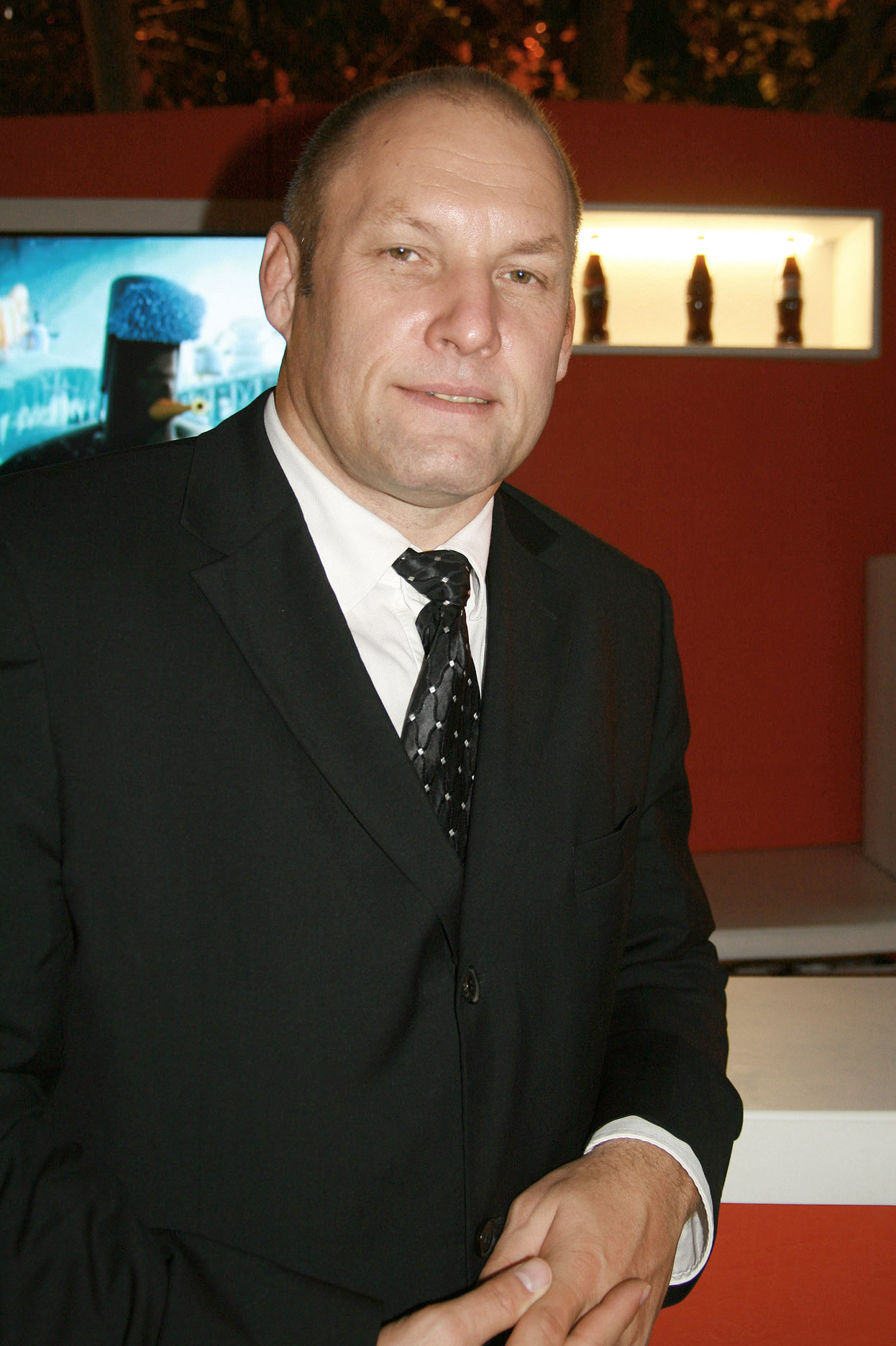
- Peter Seisenbacher in 2009

Personal information
- Born: 25 March 1960 (age 66) Vienna, Austria
- Occupation: Judo coach
- Height: 1.86 m (6 ft 1 in)

Sport
- Country: Austria
- Sport: Judo
- Rank: 7th dan black belt
- League: Erste Judo Bundesliga
- Club: JC Manner, Wien; Budoclub Wien

Achievements and titles
- Olympic Games: (gold) (1984, 1988)
- World Champ.: (1985)
- European Champ.: (gold) (1986)
Medal record
Men's judo
Representing Austria
Olympic Games
| Gold medal – first place | 1984 Los Angeles | ‍–‍86 kg |
| Gold medal – first place | 1988 Seoul | ‍–‍86 kg |
World Championships
| Gold medal – first place | 1985 Seoul | ‍–‍86 kg |
European Championships
| Gold medal – first place | 1986 Belgrade | ‍–‍86 kg |
| Silver medal – second place | 1980 Vienna | ‍–‍86 kg |
| Silver medal – second place | 1983 Paris | ‍–‍86 kg |
| Silver medal – second place | 1986 Belgrade | Open |
| Bronze medal – third place | 1984 Liege | ‍–‍86 kg |
| Bronze medal – third place | 1985 Hamar | ‍–‍86 kg |
| Bronze medal – third place | 1987 Paris | ‍–‍86 kg |
| Bronze medal – third place | 1988 Pamplona | ‍–‍86 kg |
European Junior Championships
| Bronze medal – third place | 1979 Edinburgh | ‍–‍78 kg |

Profile at external databases
- IJF: 11460
- JudoInside.com: 5694
- Updated on 18 June 2023

Peter Seisenbacher (born 25 March 1960) is a judo coach and retired judoka from Austria.

== Judo career ==
Seisenbacher competed in the middleweight category (−86 kg) at the 1980, 1984 and 1988 Olympics and won two gold medals in 1984 and 1988. He also won a world title in 1985 and a European title in 1986.

After retiring from competitions, Seisenbacher worked as a judo coach, in Austria, Georgia (2010–2012), and Azerbaijan (2012–2013). Under his guidance, the Georgian team won 2 gold, 3 silver, and 4 bronze medals at European championships, one bronze medal at a world championship, and an Olympic gold medal in 2012.

== Personal life ==
After years of circulating rumors, in June 2014, a number of women filed criminal complaints against Seisenbacher for alleged sexual misconduct against them while they were still minors. On 5 October 2016 Seisenbacher was formally indicted by the Vienna Prosecutor's Office for statutory rape of two girls, who at the time were less than 14 years of age, and for attempted sexual assault of one girl, who at the time was 16 years old. The first indictment involved a girl who was 11 when in 1999 she allegedly was sexually assaulted on multiple occasions by Seisenbacher lasting until 2001; the second indictment involved the sexual assault of a 13-year-old girl in 2004. The attempted sexual assault of the 16-year-old allegedly occurred during a training camp in Croatia in 2001.

The formal indictment came after a lengthy judicial investigation following earlier police complaints filed in 2013 by several former pupils, as reported by numerous newspapers in June 2014.

However, in December 2016 Seisenbacher failed to show up for trial in court for two days in a row and instead fled the country, after which he officially became a fugitive from justice on worldwide warrant. While Interpol searched for him in Europe, Kazachstan, the United States and Dubai, Seisenbacher was able to remain on the run for 200 days. Considered dangerous, he was finally arrested by a SWAT team on 2 August 2017 in Kyiv, Ukraine and was handed over to Austria on 12 September 2019. The trial started on 25 November in Vienna; on 2 December Seisenbacher was found guilty and sentenced to 5 years in prison. On November 4, 2022 he was released from prison.

Awards
| Preceded by (Austria) Franz Klammer | Austrian Sportsman of the year 1984–1985 | Succeeded by (Austria) Michael Hadschieff |
| Preceded by (Austria) Andreas Felder | Austrian Sportsman of the year 1988 | Succeeded by (Austria) Rudolf Nierlich |
