= Alejandro Strático =

Argentine judoka (born 1961)

Personal information
- Full name: Alejandro R. Strático
- Nationality: Argentine
- Born: 17 March 1961 (age 64)
- Height: 187 cm (6 ft 2 in)
- Weight: 82 kg (181 lb)

Sport
- Country: Argentina
- Sport: Judo

Alejandro R. Strático (born 17 March 1961) is an Argentine judoka. He competed in the men's middleweight event at the 1984 Summer Olympics. He also competed at the 1983 Pan American Games.
