= Eduardo Novoa =

Chilean judoka (born 1950)

Personal information
- Nationality: Chilean
- Born: 4 May 1950 (age 75)

Sport
- Sport: Judo

Eduardo Novoa (born 4 May 1950) is a Chilean judoka. He competed in the men's middleweight event at the 1984 Summer Olympics.
