= Daniel Brunhart =

Liechtenstein judoka (born 1968)

Personal information
- Born: 18 June 1968 (age 56)
- Occupation: Judoka

Sport
- Sport: Judo

Profile at external databases
- JudoInside.com: 54683

Daniel Brunhart (born 18 June 1968) is a retired male judoka from Liechtenstein, who competed for his native country at the 1988 Summer Olympics in Seoul. There he was eliminated in the first round of the Men's Extra-Lightweight (– 60 kg) division by Great Britain's former bronze medalist Neil Eckersley. Brunhart was one out of four judokas from Liechtenstein competing in South Korea; the other ones being Arnold Frick, Magnus Büchel, and Johannes Wohlwend.
