= Clément Nzali =

Cameroonian judoka

Personal information
- Nationality: Cameroonian
- Born: 13 August 1959 (age 65)

Sport
- Sport: Judo

Clément Nzali (born 12 August 1959) is a Cameroonian judoka. He competed in the men's middleweight event at the 1984 Summer Olympics.
