= David Southby =

British judoka

Personal information
- Nationality: English
- Born: 21 April 1965 (age 61)
Medal record
Judo
Representing England
Commonwealth Games
| Gold medal – first place | 1990 Auckland | 78kg half-middleweight |

David Southby (born 1965), is a male former judoka who competed for England.

== Judo career ==
Southby represented England and won a gold medal in the 78 kg half-middleweight category, at the 1990 Commonwealth Games in Auckland, New Zealand.
