= Luc Suplis =

Belgian judoka

Personal information
- Nationality: Belgian
- Born: 18 May 1964 (age 61) Monceau-sur-Sambre, Belgium

Sport
- Sport: Judo

Luc Suplis (born 18 May 1964) is a Belgian judoka. He competed in the men's middleweight event at the 1988 Summer Olympics.
