= Hamza Doublali =

Moroccan judoka

Personal information
- Nationality: Moroccan
- Born: 31 January 1960 (age 65)

Sport
- Sport: Judo

Hamza Doublali (born 31 January 1960) is a Moroccan judoka. He competed in the men's middleweight event at the 1984 Summer Olympics.
