= Park Kyung-ho (judoka) =

South Korean judoka (born 1963)

Personal information
- Born: 9 March 1963 (age 63)
- Occupation: Judoka

Korean name
- Hangul: 박경호
- RR: Bak Gyeongho
- MR: Pak Kyŏngho

Sport
- Country: South Korea
- Sport: Judo
- Weight class: ‍–‍86 kg

Achievements and titles
- Olympic Games: QF (1984)
- World Champ.: R32 (1985)
- Asian Champ.: (gold) (1986)
Medal record
Men's judo
Representing South Korea
Asian Championships
Silver medal – second place	1988 Damascus	‍–‍86 kg
Asian Games
Gold medal – first place	1986 Seoul	‍–‍86 kg

Profile at external databases
- IJF: 54086
- JudoInside.com: 6356
- Updated on 1 April 2024

Park Kyung-ho (Korean: 박경호; born 9 March 1963) is a South Korean judoka. He competed in the men's middleweight event at the 1984 Summer Olympics. He won a gold medal at the 1986 Asian Games in 86 kg.

Park's wife is Seo Hyang-soon, who won a gold medal in archery at the 1984 Summer Olympics. They have three children, their eldest daughter, Park Seong-min (박성민) is a professional golfer.
