= 1983 World Judo Championships =

Judo competition

Judo 1983 Men's World Judo Championships
- Venue: Luzhniki Palace of Sports
- Location: Moscow, Soviet Union
- Dates: September 13–16, 1983
- Competitors: 226 from 44 nations

Competition at external databases
- Links: IJF • JudoInside

The 1983 World Judo Championships were the 13th edition of the men's World Judo Championships, and were held in Moscow, Soviet Union from September 13–16, 1983.

== Medal overview ==
=== Men ===
Event	Gold	Silver	Bronze
-60 kg	(Soviet Union) Khazret Tletseri	(Hungary) Tamas Bujko	(Japan) Kenichi Haraguchi (East Germany) Klaus-Peter Stollberg
-65 kg	(Soviet Union) Nikolai Solodukhin	(Japan) Yoshiyuki Matsuoka	(Poland) Janusz Pawłowski (Italy) Sandro Rosati
-71 kg	(Japan) Hidetoshi Nakanishi	(Italy) Ezio Gamba	(Soviet Union) Tamaz Namgalauri (Germany) Steffen Stranz
-78 kg	(Japan) Nobutoshi Hikage	(United Kingdom) Neil Adams	(Romania) Mircea Fratica (Soviet Union) Shota Khabarelli
-86 kg	(East Germany) Detlef Ultsch	(France) Fabien Canu	(United States) Robert Berland (Japan) Seiki Nose
-95 kg	(East Germany) Andreas Preschel	(Soviet Union) Valeri Divisenko	(Germany) Gunther Neureuther (Belgium) Robert van de Walle
+95 kg	(Japan) Yasuhiro Yamashita	(Netherlands) Willy Wilhelm	(Romania) Mihail Cioc (East Germany) Henry Stohr
Open	(Japan) Hitoshi Saito	(Czechoslovakia) Vladimir Kocman	(Hungary) Andras Ozsvar (Belgium) Robert van de Walle

=== Medal table ===
Rank	Nation	Gold	Silver	Bronze	Total
1	Japan (JPN)	4	1	2	7
2	Soviet Union (URS)	2	1	2	5
3	East Germany (GDR)	2	0	2	4
4	Hungary (HUN)	0	1	1	2
4	Italy (ITA)	0	1	1	2
6	Czechoslovakia (TCH)	0	1	0	1
6	France (FRA)	0	1	0	1
6	Great Britain (GBR)	0	1	0	1
6	Netherlands (NED)	0	1	0	1
10	Belgium (BEL)	0	0	2	2
10	Romania (ROM)	0	0	2	2
10	West Germany (FRG)	0	0	2	2
13	Poland (POL)	0	0	1	1
13	United States (USA)	0	0	1	1
Totals (14 entries)		8	8	16	32
