= Hussain Shareef (judoka) =

Kuwaiti judoka

Personal information
- Nationality: Kuwaiti

Sport
- Sport: Judo

Hussain Shareef is a Kuwaiti judoka. He competed in the men's middleweight event at the 1984 Summer Olympics.
