= Christy Obekpa =

Nigerian judoka (born 1971)

Personal information
- Full name: Christy Obekpa
- Nationality: Nigeria
- Born: 15 December 1971 (age 54) Nigeria

Sport
- Sport: Judo
- Event: 78 kg
Medal record
Women's judo
Representing Nigeria
Commonwealth Judo Championships
Bronze medal – third place	1990 Auckland	72 kg
Silver medal – second place	1992 Cardiff	72 kg
All-Africa Games
Bronze medal – third place	1999 Johannesburg	78 kg
Bronze medal – third place	1999 Johannesburg	Open
African Judo Championships
Bronze medal – third place	2000 Algiers	78 kg

Christy Obekpa (born 15 December 1971) is a Nigerian judoka who competed in the women's half heavyweight category. She won a bronze medal at the 1990 Commonwealth Judo Games and a silver medal at the 1992 CW Judo Championships. Mrs Aremu is the first woman Nigeria judo commonwealth medalist. She also won two bronze medals at the 1999 All-Africa Games and a bronze medal at the 2000 African Judo Championships.

== Sports career ==
In 1990, at the Commonwealth Judo Championships held in Auckland, New Zealand. She participated in a 72 kg event where she won a bronze medal. At the 1992 Commonwealth Judo Championships held in Cardiff, Wales. She also participated and won the silver medal in the 72kg event.

At the 1999 All-Africa Games in Johannesburg, Obekpa participated in the 78kg and Open event, winning two bronze medals.

At the 2000 African Judo Championships held in Algiers, Algeria, Obekpa won a bronze medal also in the 78kg event. She also participated in the Open event and came in 7th place.
