= Ivan Todorov (judoka) =

Yugoslav judoka (born 1967)

Personal information
- Nationality: Yugoslav
- Born: 7 October 1967 (age 57)

Sport
- Sport: Judo

Ivan Todorov (born 7 October 1967) is a Yugoslav judoka and Serbian diplomat. He competed in the men's middleweight event at the 1988 Summer Olympics.

He has been working for the Serbian Ministry of Foreign Affairs since 2018, and as of 1 December 2018 he is the Ambassador of Serbia to Hungary.
