= Raymond Stevens (judoka) =

British judoka

Personal information
- Nationality: British (English)
- Born: 26 July 1963 (age 63) Camberley, Surrey
- Occupation: Judoka

Sport
- Country: Great Britain
- Sport: Judo
- Weight class: ‍–‍95 kg

Achievements and titles
- Olympic Games: (silver) (1992)
- World Champ.: 7th (1995)
- European Champ.: (silver) (1994)
- Commonwealth Games: (gold) (1990)
Medal record
Men's judo
Representing Great Britain
Olympic Games
| Silver medal – second place | 1992 Barcelona | ‍–‍95 kg |
European Championships
| Silver medal – second place | 1994 Gdansk | ‍–‍95 kg |
Commonwealth Games
| Gold medal – first place | 1990 Auckland | ‍–‍95 kg |

Profile at external databases
- IJF: 53433
- JudoInside.com: 5002
- Updated on 5 June 2023

Raymond Stevens (born 26 July 1963 in Camberley, Surrey) is a male retired judoka from the United Kingdom.

== Judo career ==
Stevens started learning Judo at the age of ten and gained a black belt in Judo at the age of 16.

He was twice a champion of Great Britain, winning the middleweight division at the British Judo Championships in 1984 and 1986. In 1986, he won the gold medal in the 86 kg weight category at the judo demonstration sport event as part of the 1986 Commonwealth Games.

Stevens competed in two consecutive Summer Olympics, starting in 1992, when he won the silver medal in the men's half heavyweight division (‍–‍95 kg), in the final he was defeated by Hungary's Antal Kovács. He represented England at the 1990 Commonwealth Games and won a gold medal in the 95 kg half-heavyweight category of the judo event in Auckland, New Zealand.

He holds the rank of 7th Dan in Judo awarded to him on 10 September 2015 and is the Vice Chairman of the British Judo Association London Area. and in 2008 he was the first person to receive a black belt in Brazilian jiu-jitsu from Roger Gracie, he subsequently received his 2nd Dan in 2015. He opened his own Martial Arts Academy in September 2017 in South London called Ray Stevens Academy. Located in Merton, (KT3 4NE) the purpose built dojo provides an environment for kids and adults to learn & train in Judo, Brazilian Jiu-Jitsu, No-Gi Wrestling, MMA and Kickboxing.
