= Arnold Frick =

Liechtensein judoka (born 1966)

Personal information
- Born: 9 July 1966 (age 58)
- Occupation: Judoka

Sport
- Sport: Judo

Profile at external databases
- JudoInside.com: 55482

Arnold Frick (born 9 July 1966) is a retired male judoka from Liechtenstein, who competed for his native country at the 1988 Summer Olympics in Seoul. There he was eliminated in the first round of the Men's Middleweight (– 86 kg) division by Senegal's veteran Akilong Diabone. Frick was one out of four judokas from Liechtenstein competing in South Korea; the other ones being Daniel Brunhart, Magnus Büchel, and Johannes Wohlwend.
