= Ng Chiu Fan =

Hong Kong judoka

Personal information
- Nationality: Hong Konger
- Born: 4 August 1962 (age 62)

Sport
- Sport: Judo

Ng Chiu Fan (born 4 August 1962) is a Hong Kong judoka. He competed in the men's middleweight event at the 1988 Summer Olympics.
