= Riad Chibani =

Algerian judoka

Personal information
- Nationality: Algerian
- Born: 27 January 1964 (age 61)

Sport
- Sport: Judo

Riad Chibani (born 27 January 1964) is an Algerian judoka. He competed in the men's middleweight event at the 1988 Summer Olympics.
