= William Medina =

Colombian judoka (born 1968)

Personal information
- Nationality: Colombian
- Born: 10 April 1968 (age 57)

Sport
- Sport: Judo

William Medina (born 10 April 1968) is a Colombian judoka. He competed in the men's middleweight event at the 1988 Summer Olympics.
