= Ben Spijkers =

Dutch judoka (born 1961)

Personal information
- Full name: Bernhard Hendrikus Martinus Spijkers
- Nickname: Ben
- Born: 10 March 1961 (age 65) Nijmegen, Gelderland, Netherlands
- Occupation: Judoka

Sport
- Country: Netherlands
- Sport: Judo
- Weight class: –‍86 kg

Achievements and titles
- Olympic Games: (bronze) (1988)
- World Champ.: (silver) (1989)
- European Champ.: (silver) (1986)
Medal record
Men's judo
Representing the Netherlands
Olympic Games
Bronze medal – third place	1988 Seoul	‍–‍86 kg
World Championships
Silver medal – second place	1989 Belgrade	‍–‍86 kg
European Championships
Silver medal – second place	1986 Belgrade	‍–‍86 kg
Bronze medal – third place	1984 Liege	‍–‍86 kg
Bronze medal – third place	1988 Pamplona	‍–‍86 kg

Profile at external databases
- IJF: 1557
- JudoInside.com: 1690
- Updated on 6 June 2023

Bernhard Hendrikus Martinus Spijkers (born 10 March 1961) is a Dutch retired judoka who represented his native country at three consecutive Summer Olympics (1984, 1988 and 1992). He won a bronze medal in the men's middleweight division (‍–‍86 kg) in Seoul, South Korea (1988), alongside Akinobu Osako from Japan.

In 1995, Spijkers tried his hand at mixed martial arts competition by competing in the World Combat Championship and Shooto events.

== Mixed martial arts career ==
Spijkers had his MMA debut in the Japanese promotion Shooto against the veteran Erik Paulson. Cornered by Gerard Gordeau, Ben rushed Paulson through the fight with multiple takedown attempts, along with brawling style punches and some hip tosses which connected. However, Erik showed a proficient defense and superior striking, and the fight went outside the ring when the two fell between the ropes and later when Paulson threw Spijkers outside. Ending came at the fifth round when Paulson avoided another takedown attempt and locked a guillotine choke, making Spijkers tap.

Ben's second, and last, MMA fight would be at World Combat Championships (WCC), facing Brazilian jiu-jitsu stylist Renzo Gracie at the first round. Started the match, the judogi-clad Spijkers got a morote gari, but Gracie swept him back to standing and executed his own takedown. Ben tried to counter on the ground with a gi choke, but Renzo took his back and delivered some elbow strikes to the base of the skull before submitting him. Upon the ending of the battle Gracie stepped on the back of Spijkers's head, though later apologized for his unsporting actions. On his return flight to the Netherlands afterwards, Ben was arrested after a dispute with an airline stewardess regarding his carry on baggage. He was released on bail and flew back to Europe a few days later.

== Mixed martial arts record ==
Professional record breakdown
2 matches	0 wins	2 losses
By submission	0	2

Res.	Record	Opponent	Method	Event	Date	Round	Time	Location	Notes
Loss	0–2	Renzo Gracie	Submission (choke)	WCC 1 - First Strike	October 17, 1995	1	2:38	Charlotte, North Carolina, US	
Loss	0–1	Erik Paulson	Submission (guillotine choke)	Shooto - Complete Vale Tudo Access	July 29, 1995	5	0:38	Omiya, Saitama, Japan	
