= Walter Hanl =

Austrian Paralympic judoka

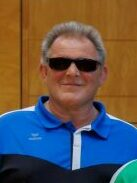

Personal information
- Born: 3 April 1964 (age 62)
- Occupation: Judoka

Sport
- Country: Austria
- Sport: Paralympic judo
- Rank: 5th dan black belt
- Club: SV Gallneukirchen
Medal record
Men's Para judo
Representing Austria
Paralympic Games
Gold medal – first place	1996 Atlanta	+95 kg
Gold medal – first place	2000 Sydney	-100 kg
IBSA World Championships
Gold medal – first place	1995 USA	Heavyweight
IBSA European Championships
Gold medal – first place	1993 Paris	Heavyweight
Gold medal – first place	1995 Valladolid	Heavyweight
Gold medal – first place	1997 Citta di Castello	Heavyweight
Gold medal – first place	1999 Mittersill	Heavyweight

Profile at external databases
- JudoInside.com: 3196

Walter Hanl (born 3 April 1964) is an Austrian Paralympic judoka. He represented Austria at the 1996 Summer Paralympics held in Atlanta, United States and at the 2000 Summer Paralympics held in Sydney, Australia. He won two medals: the gold medal in the men's +95 kg event in 1996 and in the men's -100 kg event in 2000.

== Achievements ==
Year	Tournament	Place	Weight class	Ref.
2000	Summer Paralympics	1	−100 kg	
1996	Summer Paralympics	1	+95 kg	
1995	IBSA World Judo Championships	1	Heavyweight	
1999	IBSA European Judo Championships	1	Heavyweight	
1997	IBSA European Judo Championships	1	Heavyweight	
1995	IBSA European Judo Championships	1	Heavyweight	
1993	IBSA European Judo Championships	1	Heavyweight	
