= Johannes Wohlwend =

Liechtenstein judoka (born 1964)

Johannes Wohlwend (born 15 November 1964) is a retired male judoka from Liechtenstein, who competed for his native country at the 1988 Summer Olympics in Seoul, South Korea. There he was eliminated in the repêchage round of the Men's Lightweight (– 71 kg) division by West Germany's Steffen Stranz.

Wohlwend was one out of four judokas from Liechtenstein competing in South Korea and finished in 7th place; the other ones being Arnold Frick, Daniel Brunhart, and Magnus Büchel. He also competed at the 1984 Summer Olympics in Los Angeles, California and finished in 9th place. Johannes Wohlwend is the Secretary General of the NOC Liechtenstein since 2001.
