= János Gyáni =

Hungarian judoka

Personal information
- Nationality: Hungarian
- Born: 25 February 1959 (age 66); Gyula, Hungary

Sport
- Sport: Judo

János Gyáni (born 25 February 1959) is a Hungarian judoka. He competed at the 1980 Summer Olympics and the 1988 Summer Olympics.
