= Andreas Preschel =

East German judoka

Personal information
- Born: 1 February 1961 (age 65)
- Occupation: Judoka

Sport
- Sport: Judo
Medal record
Men's judo
World Championships
Gold medal – first place	1983 Moscow	Judo
European Championships
Bronze medal – third place	1985 Hamar	Judo

Profile at external databases
- JudoInside.com: 5624

Andreas Preschel (born 1 February 1961) is an East German judoka who competed for the SC Dynamo Berlin / Sportvereinigung (SV) Dynamo. He won the 1983 World Championships in the weight class up to 95 kg.
