= Tom Greenway (judoka) =

Canadian judoka (1956–2004)

Personal information
- Born: 28 September 1956 Lethbridge, Alberta, Canada
- Died: 15 July 2004 (aged 47)
- Occupation: Judoka

Sport
- Sport: Judo

Profile at external databases
- JudoInside.com: 9611

Tom Greenway (28 September 1956 – 15 July 2004) was a Canadian judoka. He competed in the men's heavyweight event at the 1976 Summer Olympics. In 1986, he won the bronze medal in the +95 kg weight category at the judo demonstration sport event as part of the 1986 Commonwealth Games.

== See also ==
- Judo in Canada
- List of Canadian judoka
