= Liu Junlin =

Chinese judoka (born 1963)

Personal information
- Full name: Chinese: 劉 俊林; pinyin: Liú Jùn-lín
- Nationality: Chinese
- Born: 13 March 1963 (age 62); Nanjing, Jiangsu Province
- Occupation: Judoka

Sport
- Sport: Judo

Profile at external databases
- IJF: 53751
- JudoInside.com: 6326

Liu Junlin (born 13 March 1963 in Nanjing, Jiangsu Province) is a Chinese judoka. He competed at the 1984 Summer Olympics and the 1988 Summer Olympics.
