= Judo at the 1986 Commonwealth Games =

Judo competition

Judo Judo at the 1986 Commonwealth Games
- Venue: Meadowbank Stadium
- Location: Edinburgh, Scotland
- Dates: 28–31 July 1986

Competition at external databases
- Links: JudoInside

Judo at the 1986 Commonwealth Games was the first time that Judo at the Commonwealth Games was included as a sport. It was however just as a demonstration sport (alongside canoeing) and did not contribute towards the medal table. The sport took place at Meadowbank Stadium and saw full capacity attendances. The event like many at the 1986 Games was affected by the boycott of multiple nations.

== Medal table ==
* Host nation (Scotland)

Rank	Nation	Gold	Silver	Bronze	Total
1	England (ENG)	11	5	9	25
2	Northern Ireland (NIR)	2	1	0	3
3	Scotland (SCO)*	1	3	4	8
4	Canada (CAN)	0	3	6	9
5	New Zealand (NZL)	0	1	1	2
6	Isle of Man (IOM)	0	1	0	1
7	Australia (AUS)	0	0	4	4
7	Wales (WAL)	0	0	4	4
Totals (8 entries)		14	14	28	56

== Results ==
Event	Gold	Silver	Bronze
Men
Extra Lightweight U60kg	Carl Finney (ENG)	Neil Eckersley (ENG)	Russell Copp (WAL); Phil Takahashi (CAN)
Half Lightweight U65kg	Colin Savage (NIR)	David Rance (ENG)	Willie Bell (SCO); Mark Adshead (ENG)
Lightweight U71kg	Kerrith Brown (ENG)	Harley Jones (CAN)	Mark Earle (ENG); Stewart Brain (AUS)
Half Middleweight U78kg	Paul Sheals (ENG)	Martin McSorley (SCO)	Fitzroy Davies (ENG); Bill Vincent (NZL)
Middleweight U86kg	Ray Stevens (ENG)	Densign White (ENG)	Andrew Richardson (AUS); Kevin Doherty (CAN)
Half Heavyweight U95kg	Nicholas Kokotaylo (ENG)	Joe Meli (CAN)	Graham Campbell (SCO); Dennis Stewart (ENG)
Heavyweight O95kg	Elvis Gordon (ENG)	Mark Berger (CAN)	Tom Greenway (CAN); Mark Scully (AUS)
Women
Extra Lightweight U48kg	Karen Briggs (ENG)	Anne Marie Mulholland (SCO)	Lyne Poirier (CAN); Anisah Mohamoodally (ENG)
Half Lightweight U52kg	Sharon Rendle (ENG)	Loretta Doyle (SCO)	Claire Shiach (SCO); Lisa Griffiths (WAL)
Lightweight U56kg	Ann Hughes (ENG)	Karen Gray (NIR)	Nathalie Gosselin (CAN); Helen Morgan (WAL)
Half Middleweight U61kg	Diane Bell (ENG)	Donna Guy (NZL)	Helen Lewis (AUS); Teresa Quoi (ENG)
Middleweight U66kg	Eileen Boyle (SCO)	Dawn Netherwood (ENG)	Rowena Sweatman (ENG); Tammy Patterson (CAN)
Half Heavyweight U72kg	Avril Malley (NIR)	Anne Lucitt (ENG)	Joanne Spinks (ENG); Lorna McNeil (SCO)
Heavyweight O72kg	Sandra Bradshaw (ENG)	Ruth Vondy (IOM)	Sharon Lee (ENG); Suzanne Simpkins (WAL)
