= Sharon Rendle =

British judoka (born 1966)

Sharon Rendle MBE
Personal information
- Full name: Sharon Susan Rendle
- Nationality: British (English)
- Born: 18 June 1966 (age 60) Kingston upon Hull, England
- Occupation: Judoka

Sport
- Country: Great Britain
- Sport: Judo
- Weight class: ‍–‍52 kg

Achievements and titles
- Olympic Games: (gold) (1988)
- World Champ.: (1987, 1989)
- European Champ.: (gold) (1990, 1996)
- Commonwealth Games: (gold) (1990)
Medal record
Women's judo
Representing Great Britain
Olympic Games
Gold medal – first place	1988 Seoul	‍–‍52 kg
Bronze medal – third place	1992 Barcelona	‍–‍52 kg
World Championships
Gold medal – first place	1987 Essen	‍–‍52 kg
Gold medal – first place	1989 Belgrade	‍–‍52 kg
Silver medal – second place	1991 Barcelona	‍–‍52 kg
Bronze medal – third place	1986 women Maastricht	‍–‍52 kg
Bronze medal – third place	1995 Chiba	‍–‍52 kg
European Championships
Gold medal – first place	1990 Frankfurt	‍–‍52 kg
Gold medal – first place	1996 The Hague	‍–‍52 kg
Bronze medal – third place	1987 Paris	‍–‍52 kg
Bronze medal – third place	1989 Helsinki	‍–‍52 kg
Bronze medal – third place	1995 Birmingham	‍–‍52 kg
Representing England
Commonwealth Games
Gold medal – first place	1990 Auckland	‍–‍52 kg

Profile at external databases
- IJF: 53269
- JudoInside.com: 2333
- Updated on 5 June 2023

Sharon Susan Rendle MBE (born 18 June 1966 in Kingston upon Hull, East Riding of Yorkshire) is a female retired judoka from the United Kingdom.

== Early life ==
In the early 1980s she trained twice a week at Grimsby Judo club. 23 year old Ann Lucitt, from the Grimsby club, won silver at the 1986 Commonwealth Games.

In January 1988 the minibus of Grimsby College was stolen in London, at an event, and much of the belongings were lost.

She is only 5 feet tall. She lived with Ann Lucitt on Hawthorne Avenue in New Waltham from the mid-1980s, with coach Jennie and Terry Alltoft.

== Judo career ==
Rendle competed in two consecutive Summer Olympics, starting in 1992, when she won a bronze medal in the women's featherweight division (‍–‍52 kg). She was a multiple medal winner at the World Championships including winning gold at both the 1987 and the 1989 World Championships, also in the women's featherweight division (‍–‍52 kg).

Rendle also won a gold medal in the ‍–‍52 kg division at the 1988 Summer Olympics in Seoul, where women's judo was held as a demonstration sport. She also represented England at the 1990 Commonwealth Games and won a gold medal in the ‍–‍52 kg half-lightweight category, at the judo event in Auckland, New Zealand.

In 1986, Rendle won the gold medal in the ‍–‍52 kg weight category at the judo demonstration sport event as part of the 1986 Commonwealth Games. In addition to her international success she was champion of Great Britain on four occasions, winning the featherweight division at the British Judo Championships in 1985, 1986, 1987 and 1991.

In the late 1990s she became the Australian national coach.
