= Elvis Gordon =

British judoka

Personal information
- Nickname: The Cat
- National team: England
- Born: Elvis Anthony Gordon; 23 June 1958 Hanover, Jamaica
- Died: 6 May 2011 (aged 52) Wolverhampton, England, UK
- Occupation: Judoka
- Height: 1.88 m (6 ft 2 in)
- Weight: 132 kg (291 lb; 20.8 st)

Sport
- Country: Great Britain
- Sport: Judo
- Weight class: Heavyweight (over 95kg)
- Rank: 6th dan black belt
- Club: Wolverhampton Judo Club (1971–1992); Neil Adams Club (1992–1993)

Achievements and titles
- Highest world ranking: 2nd (1987)
Medal record
Men's Judo
Representing England
Commonwealth Games
Gold medal – first place	1986 Edinburgh	+95
Gold medal – first place	1990 Auckland	Open
Gold medal – first place	1990 Auckland	+95
Representing United Kingdom
World Championships
Silver medal – second place	1987 Essen	Open
European Championships
Gold medal – first place	1988 Pamplona	Open
Bronze medal – third place	1985 Hamar	Open
Bronze medal – third place	1992 Paris	Open
World Cups/Continental Open
Gold medal – first place	1989 World Masters Rüsselsheim	+95
Silver medal – second place	1989 Tournoi de Paris	+95
Silver medal – second place	1992 World Masters Munich	+95
European Team Championships
Bronze medal – third place	1987 Paris	Team
Bronze medal – third place	1990 Dubrovnik	Team
Bronze medal – third place	1992 Leonding	Team
International Tournaments
Gold medal – first place	1981 Welsh Senior Open Cardiff	+95
Gold medal – first place	1985 British Masters Birmingham	+95
Gold medal – first place	1985 British Open London	+95
Gold medal – first place	1986 German Open Rüsselsheim	+95
Gold medal – first place	1987 Scottish Open Edinburgh	+95
Gold medal – first place	1988 Matsutaro Shoriki Cup Tokyo	+95
Gold medal – first place	1989 British Open London	+95
Gold medal – first place	1991 Scottish Open Edinburgh	+95
Gold medal – first place	1991 British Open London	+95
Gold medal – first place	1992 British Open London	+95
Silver medal – second place	1982 Dutch Open Kerkrade	+95
Silver medal – second place	1983 Dutch Open Kerkrade	+95
Silver medal – second place	1984 British Open London	+95
Silver medal – second place	1984 Belgian Open Gent	+95
Bronze medal – third place	1983 Belgian Open Gent	+95
Bronze medal – third place	1986 Tournoi de Paris	+95
Bronze medal – third place	1987 Tournoi de Paris	+95
Bronze medal – third place	1989 Sungkop Tournament Seoul	+95
Bronze medal – third place	1990 Wolverhampton Judo Masters	Open
Bronze medal – third place	1990 British Open London	+95
Bronze medal – third place	1992 Belgian Open Championships Visé	+95
Bronze medal – third place	1993 British Open Birmingham	+95
Bronze medal – third place	1995 US Open Macon Georgia	+95

Profile at external databases
- JudoInside.com: 2295

Elvis Gordon (23 June 1958 – 11 May 2011) was a Jamaican-born English heavyweight judoka who won numerous medals representing Great Britain. He competed for Great Britain at the 1984, 1988 and 1992 Olympic games. Gordon won silver in the 1987 World Judo Championships, was European champion in 1988, and Commonwealth champion in 1986 and 1990. He retired from competitive judo in 1993, and subsequently competed at the 1994 Sumo World Championships as a wrestler in the heavyweight category. In 2009, he made a brief return to judo, winning silver at the 2009 British Masters Championship in the men's 50–54 years over-100 kg category.

== Early life ==
Gordon was born on 23 June 1958 in Hanover, Jamaica. He emigrated to Britain with his family in 1967, settling in Wolverhampton, West Midlands. Gordon began studying judo in 1972 at Northicote School, Wolverhampton, and joined the Wolverhampton Judo Club, coached by Malcolm "Mac" Abbotts. Abbotts said of him: "I couldn't believe the strength in him, even at that age." As a teenager, Gordon drifted from judo into powerlifting, and came 2nd in the under-19 national powerlifting championships at age 15.

== Major achievements ==
- 3 x times Olympian (1984, 1988, 1992)
- World Championship silver medal (1987)
- 3 x times Commonwealth gold medallist (1986 x2, 1990)
- European Championship gold (1988) and 2 bronze 1985 & 1992)
- 8 x times champion of Great Britain at the British Judo Championships 1981, 1983, 1984, 1985 (+open), 1987, 1989, 1991.
- In 1986, he won the bronze medal in the 95 kg weight category at the judo demonstration sport event as part of the 1986 Commonwealth Games.

== Later life ==
After retiring from competitive sport, Gordon was employed as the caretaker at Moseley Park School in Bilston, West Midlands, where he also provided judo coaching. In 2010, he was diagnosed with pancreatic cancer, and died in May 2011. Following Gordon's death, students at his place of work chose to name the school's new gymnasium after him. Nick Elwiss, the head teacher, said: "He was held in extremely high regard by staff and pupils and is fondly remembered by us all."

== See also ==
- Judo in the United Kingdom
