= Rene Capo =

American judoka (1961–2009)

Personal information
- Native name: Rene Caposki
- Nationality: United States
- Born: René Capo; May 9, 1961 Pinar del Río, Cuba
- Died: July 6, 2009 (aged 48) Chicago, Illinois, United States
- Education: University of Minnesota
- Occupation: Judoka
- Height: 6 ft 1 in (1.85 m)
- Children: 2

Sport
- Sport: Judo
- Weight class: Heavyweight
Medal record
Men's Judo
Representing the United States
High School Nationals
Gold medal – first place	1977 Yale	Heavyweight
Gold medal – first place	1979 Rogers	Heavyweight
Pacific Rim Championships
Gold medal – first place	1987 Colorado Springs	Heavyweight
US Olympic Trials
Gold medal – first place	1988 Colorado Springs	Heavyweight
Gold medal – first place	1996 Colorado Springs	Heavyweight
United States Senior Nationals
Gold medal – first place	1989 Tampa	-86 kg
Gold medal – first place	1991 Honolulu	-95 kg
Silver medal – second place	1997 Ft. Lauderdale	+95 kg
Finnish Open
Silver medal – second place	1995	Heavyweight

Profile at external databases
- IJF: 53439
- JudoInside.com: 11397

Rene Capo (May 9, 1961 – July 6, 2009) was a judoka from the United States who competed in the 1988 Summer Olympics and the 1996 Summer Olympics. Capo immigrated to the United States from Cuba as a young boy. Though he won several judo championships in high school, Capo took a four-year break from the sport to attend the University of Minnesota. After college, Capo went on to qualify for two United States Olympics teams, could not compete as an alternate in another due to a back injury, and narrowly missed making the 2008 team. In 2008, Capo was diagnosed with lung cancer, which caused his death the following year.

== Early life ==
Capo immigrated to the United States from Pinar del Río, Cuba in 1962, when he was still an infant, and grew up in Hialeah, Florida. He learned Judo as a member of Florida Judo Kai, under the tutelage of Cuban Champion Reinaldo Montpellier. After graduating from Hialeah-Miami Lakes High School He attended the University of Minnesota, where he played defensive tackle for the Golden Gophers from 1979 to 1982, sharing a team record with four sacks.

== Judo career ==
=== Amateur competition ===
At the age of six, Capo competed in his first judo competition, and had won his first tournament by nine. By the time of his graduation, Capo had earned a national high school gold medal, and won the silver medal at the United States Senior Nationals.

=== Professional career ===
After a four-year break from Judo in which he focused on football and college, Capo won a gold medal at the 1987 Pacific Rim Championships. A year later, he upset a number of highly ranked heavyweights at the US Judo Olympic Trials. At the 1988 Summer Olympics in Seoul, Capo finished 19th. Capo qualified as the alternate for the 1992 Summer Olympics, but was unable to compete due to severe neck injury. After having surgery on two vertebrae, he made it to the 1996 Summer Olympics, where he was eliminated the first day. From 2005 to 2007, Capo taught judo at the Jason Morris Judo Center in Glenville. He narrowly missed qualifying for the 2008 Summer Olympics, losing to his own student, Kyle Vashkulat. At the 2008 USA Judo Senior National Championships one month later, Capo placed fifth.

== Cancer ==
In 2008, Capo, a non-smoker, was diagnosed with lung cancer, from which he died on July 6, 2009, in Chicago, Illinois. At the time, he lived in Naperville, Illinois, where he had moved to earn money selling magazine subscriptions to schools.
