= Graeme Spinks =

New Zealand judoka (born 1961)

Personal information
- Nationality: New Zealand
- Born: 17 January 1961 (age 64); Christchurch, New Zealand

Sport
- Sport: Judo

Graeme spinks (born 17 January 1961) is a New Zealand judoka. He competed at the 1984 Summer Olympics and the 1992 Summer Olympics. Spinks is a martial arts trainer in his birth-city Christchurch. He trained New Zealand Police in the use of force in self-defence, and restraint training, including carotid holds which can render a person unconscious within seconds; this choking method is rarely applied by Police.
