= Nicola Morris =

New Zealand judoko

Nicola Morris (born 9 September 1967) is a former judo competitor from New Zealand. At the 1990 Commonwealth Games she won a bronze medal in women's judo.

Morris was born in Auckland, New Zealand, in 1967. She competed in national and regional judo championships including the New Zealand Championships in 1988 and the Oceania Championships in 1990. She represented New Zealand at international level twice: at the 1990 Commonwealth Games and the 1992 Summer Olympics.
