= Tatsuto Mochida =

Japanese judoka (born 1965)

Medal record

Representing Japan

Men's Judo

World Championships
Silver medal – second place	1989 Belgrade	-78 kg

Tatsuto Mochida (持田 達人, Mochida Tatsuto, born April 3, 1965) is a Japanese judoka.

He was born in Shima, Fukuoka, and began judo at Kodogakusha (講道学舎, Kōdōgakusha) in earnest at the age of a junior high student.

After graduating from Nihon University, Mochida entered the Tokyo Metropolitan Police Department and won a silver medal at the -78 kg category of the World Championships in 1989.

He was good at Okuriashi harai, Harai tsurikomi ashi and Uchi mata.

Mochida retired after All-Japan Police Championships in 1998. As of 2009, he coaches All-Japan men's judo team and so on.

== Achievements ==
- 1984 - All-Japan Junior Championships (-78 kg) 1st
- 1985 - All-Japan University Championships (-78 kg) 1st
- 1986 - Kodokan Cup (-78 kg) 3rd
- 1987 - All-Japan Selected Championships (-78 kg) 2nd

- All-Japan University Championships (-78 kg) 1st

- 1988 - Kodokan Cup (-86 kg) 3rd
- 1989 - World Championships (-78 kg) 2nd

- All-Japan Selected Championships (-78 kg) 1st
- Kodokan Cup (-78 kg) 1st

- 1990 - Jigoro Kano Cup (-78 kg) 3rd

- Tournoi Super World Cup Paris (-78 kg) 1st
- Kodokan Cup (-78 kg) 1st

- 1991 - All-Japan Selected Championships (-78 kg) 3rd
- 1992 - Jigoro Kano Cup (-78 kg) 1st

- All-Japan Selected Championships (-78 kg) 2nd

- 1993 - All-Japan Selected Championships (-78 kg) 3rd
- 1994 - All-Japan Selected Championships (-78 kg) 1st

- Kodokan Cup (-78 kg) 2nd

- 1995 - All-Japan Selected Championships (-78 kg) 2nd

- All-Japan Police Championships (Middleweight) 1st

- 1996 - All-Japan Police Championships (-86 kg) 1st
- 1997 - All-Japan Police Championships (-86 kg) 2nd
