= Alfonso García (judoka) =

Spanish judoka

Personal information
- Full name: Alfonso García Ortiz
- Nationality: Spanish
- Born: 17 October 1960 (age 64)
- Height: 183 cm (6 ft 0 in)
- Weight: 86 kg (190 lb)

Sport
- Country: Spain
- Sport: Judo

Alfonso García Ortiz (Note: In this Spanish name, the first or paternal surname is García and the second or maternal family name is Ortiz.) (born 17 October 1960) is a Spanish judoka. He competed in the men's middleweight event at the 1984 Summer Olympics.
