= Magnus Büchel =

Liechtenstein judoka (born 1960)

Personal information
- Born: 11 March 1960 (age 65)
- Occupation: Judoka

Sport
- Sport: Judo

Profile at external databases
- JudoInside.com: 52110

Magnus Büchel (born 11 March 1960) is a retired male judoka from Liechtenstein, who competed for his native country at the 1984 Summer Olympics in Los Angeles and the 1988 Summer Olympics in Seoul. In 1988 he was eliminated in the first round of the Men's Half-Middleweight (– 78 kg) division by Hong Kong's Lam Lap Hing. Büchel was one out of four judokas from Liechtenstein competing in South Korea; the other ones being Arnold Frick, Daniel Brunhart, and Johannes Wohlwend.
