= Tovia Preschel =

Jewish biographer, historian and journalist

Rabbi Tovia (Theodore) Preschel (1922-2013) was a Jewish biographer, historian and journalist.

His biographical sketches, some spanning two or more issues, appeared in The Jewish Press for decades.

Encyclopedias to which he contributed include Yivo Encyclopedia, Encyclopedia Talmudit and Encyclopaedia Judaica. Preschel authored Encyclopedia Americana's Talmud article.

== Biography ==
He was born in 1922 to Moshe and Pearl Liba Preschel. His siblings were Dorah, an older sister, and Yosef, who died before Tovia was born. Prior to the outbreak of World War II the family lived in Vienna. Tovia survived in London after being sent via a Kindertransport in 1938.

Preschel's Jewish education while in England included studying with Rabbi Elya Lopian. Somewhat after the war he moved to Israel, where he began his career as a writer and later an editor, working on an encyclopedia. In that capacity he began to author biographical sketches, writing in Hebrew, Yiddish and English. Later on his biographies began to appear in various Israeli and American periodicals.

He was an age 91 great-grandfather when he died in 2013, leaving behind his wife, their four children, and their descendants.

== Works ==
In addition to his biographies, he edited a series of century-plus old Hagadas, preparing them for reprinting:

- Sulzbach Haggadah (originally printed 1755)
- The Hanover Haggadah (originally published 1861)
