= Darren Fagan =

Australian judoka

Personal information
- Nationality: Australian
- Born: 6 December 1967 (age 58) Liverpool, New South Wales, Australia

Sport
- Sport: Judo

Darren Michael Fagan (born 6 December 1967) is an Australian judoka. He competed in the men's half-lightweight event at the 1996 Summer Olympics.
