= Michel Grant =

Swedish judoka

Personal information
- Nationality: Swedish
- Born: 14 February 1958 (age 67); Stockholm, Sweden

Sport
- Sport: Judo

Michel Grant (born 14 February 1958) is a Swedish judoka. He competed at the 1980 Summer Olympics and the 1984 Summer Olympics.
