= Walter Carmona =

Brazilian judoka (born 1957)

Wálter Carmona
Personal information
- Born: 21 June 1957 (age 69) São Paulo, Brazil
- Occupation: Judoka

Sport
- Country: Brazil
- Sport: Judo
- Weight class: ‍–‍86 kg

Achievements and titles
- Olympic Games: (bronze) (1984)
- World Champ.: (bronze) (1979)
- Pan American Champ.: (1980, 1980, 1984)
Medal record
Men's judo
Representing Brazil
Olympic Games
Bronze medal – third place	1984 Los Angeles	‍–‍86 kg
World Championships
Bronze medal – third place	1979 Paris	‍–‍86 kg
Pan American Games
Bronze medal – third place	1983 Caracas	‍–‍86 kg
Pan American Championships
Gold medal – first place	1980 Isla Margarita	Open
Gold medal – first place	1980 Isla Margarita	‍–‍86 kg
Gold medal – first place	1984 Mexico CIty	‍–‍86 kg

Profile at external databases
- IJF: 53756
- JudoInside.com: 678
- Updated on 19 June 2023

Wálter Carmona (born 21 June 1957) is a Brazilian judoka and Olympic medalist. He placed 5th at the 1980 Summer Olympics in Moscow, and won a bronze medal at the 1984 Summer Olympics in Los Angeles.
