= Gerda Winklbauer =

Personal information
- Born: 20 November 1955 (age 70) Stockerau
- Education: Universität Wien
- Occupation: Judoka
- Years active: 1973-1987

Sport
- Country: Austria
- Sport: Judo
- Weight class: ‍–‍56 kg
- Rank: 6th dan black belt
- Club: JGV Schuh Ski
- Coached by: Ernst Raser
Medal record
Women's judo
Representing Austria

Profile at external databases
- IJF: 57553
- JudoInside.com: 5703

Gerda Winklbauer (born November 20, 1955 in Stockerau) is an Austrian doctor and former athlete. She was one of the most successful judoka in the world in the late 1970s and early 1980s. She holds the 6th Dan.

== Judo career ==
Gerda Winklbauer, like her three sisters, competed for the club JGV Schuh Ski. In 1979 she won her first of four European championship titles. In 1980 she won the title in New York City at the world championships, which were held for women for the first time. She won further European championship titles in 1980, 1981 and 1983. She took third place at the home world championships in Vienna. In 1983 she was voted Austrian Sportswoman of the Year. Her special technique was the Shime-waza.

After her sporting career, she worked as a doctor in Stockerau until her retirement.

== Achievements ==
- 1st place World Championships 1980 New York up to 56 kg
- 1st place European Championships 1978 Cologne up to 56 kg
- 1st place European Championships 1979 Kerkrade up to 56 kg
- 1st place European Championships 1980 Udine up to 56 kg
- 1st place European Championships 1981 Madrid up to 56 kg
- 1st place European Championships 1983 Genoa up to 56 kg
- 3rd place World Championships 1984 Vienna up to 56 kg
- 2nd place European Championships 1976 Vienna up to 56 kg
- 2nd place European Championships 1984 Pirmasens up to 56 kg
- 2nd place European Championships 1985 Landskrona up to 56 kg
- 3rd place European Championships 1975 Munich up to 56 kg
- multiple Austrian champion

== Awards ==
- 1983: Austrian Sportswoman of the Year
- 2018: Honorary member of the Vienna Judo Association
