= Akilong Diabone =

Senegalese judoka (1955–2025)

Akiling Diabone
Personal information
- Nationality: Senegalese
- Born: 1955 Oussouye, Ziguinchor Region, French Senegal, French West Africa
- Died: 20 November 2025 (aged 70) Ziguinchor, Ziguinchor Region, Senegal
- Height: 185 cm (6 ft 1 in)
- Weight: 87 kg (192 lb)

Sport
- Sport: Judo

Akiling Diabone (1955 – 20 November 2025) was a Senegalese judoka. He competed at the 1980 Summer Olympics and the 1988 Summer Olympics. Diabone died on 20 November 2025, at the age of 70.
