= Eric-Louis Bessi =

Monegasque judoka (born 1958)

Personal information
- Nationality: Monegasque
- Born: 23 November 1958 (age 66)
- Occupation: Judoka

Sport
- Sport: Judo

Eric-Louis Bessi (born 23 November 1958) is a Monegasque judoka. He competed at the 1984 Summer Olympics and the 1988 Summer Olympics. His son, Cedric, also represented Monaco in judo at the Olympics, competing at the 2020 Summer Games.
