= Roy Stone (judoka) =

British judoka

Personal information
- Nationality: British (English)
- Born: 14 April 1966 (age 60)
- Occupation: Judoka

Sport
- Sport: Judo
- Weight class: lightweight
Medal record
Men's judo
Representing England
Commonwealth Games
Gold medal – first place	1990 Auckland	71kg lightweight

Profile at external databases
- JudoInside.com: 5004

Roy Charles Stone (born 14 April 1966), is a former judoka who competed for England.

== Judo career ==
Stone became champion of Great Britain, winning the lightweight division at the British Judo Championships in 1985.

He represented England and won a gold medal in the 71 kg lightweight category, at the 1990 Commonwealth Games in Auckland, New Zealand.

== Personal life ==
He is a science and maths teacher by trade and lives in northern Sweden.
