= Commonwealth Judo Championships =

Judo competition

The Commonwealth Judo Championships are an international judo competition, open to countries of the Commonwealth of Nations. Inaugurated in 1986, the Championships are held on a biennial basis, and are recognised by the Commonwealth Games Federation, and organised by the Commonwealth Judo Association. As Judo is an optional sport for the purposes of the Commonwealth Games, on the three occasions since 1986 that judo has been included in the Commonwealth Games programme, the Games judo tournament has doubled as the Commonwealth Judo Championships for that year; in 1990, 2002 and 2014. On these occasions, the host organising committee of the Games takes responsibility for organising the tournament on behalf of the CJA and CGF. From 2022, Judo will become a core sport in the Commonwealth Games schedule.

The Championships have been staged in the following cities:

- 1986 Edinburgh, Scotland
- 1988 Coleraine, Northern Ireland
- 1990 Auckland, New Zealand. Part of the 1990 Commonwealth Games
- 1992 Cardiff, Wales
- 1994 Gozo, Malta
- 1996 Vacoas, Mauritius
- 1998 Edinburgh, Scotland
- 2000 Stephenville, Canada
- 2002 Manchester, England. Part of the 2002 Commonwealth Games
- 2004 Waitakere City, New Zealand
- 2006 Derry, Northern Ireland
- 2008 Vacoas, Mauritius
- 2010 Singapore
- 2012 Cardiff
- 2014 Glasgow, Scotland. Part of the 2014 Commonwealth Games
- 2016 Port Elizabeth, South Africa
- 2018 Jaipur, India
- 2019 Walsall, England
- 2022 Birmingham, England. Part of the 2022 Commonwealth Games
- 2026 Glasgow, Scotland. Part of the 2026 Commonwealth Games

== Derry 2006 ==
The 2006 Commonwealth Judo Championships were held at the Templemore Sports Complex, Derry, Northern Ireland from 16 June to 18 June 2006. The twenty competing teams were from:

1. Australia
2. Canada
3. England
4. Ghana
5. India
6. Isle of Man
7. Jersey
8. Kenya
9. Malta
10. New Zealand
11. Nigeria
12. Northern Ireland
13. Pakistan
14. Scotland
15. Singapore
16. South Africa
17. Trinidad & Tobago
18. Uganda
19. Wales
20. Zambia
