= Bill Vincent =

New Zealand judoka

Personal information
- Full name: William Albert Vincent
- Born: 16 April 1957 (age 69) Kawakawa, New Zealand

Sport
- Country: New Zealand
- Sport: Judo

William Albert Vincent (born 16 April 1957) is a New Zealand judoka. He was first selected for the Moscow 1980 Summer Olympics in the -86kg division but, like many others, had his entry pulled by the NZ Judo Association who buckled under political coercion from the NZ Government to support the USA lead Western Block boycott of the games following Russia's invasion of Afghanistan. He competed at the 1984 Summer Olympics and the 1988 Summer Olympics. In 1986, he won the bronze medal in the 78 kg weight category at the judo demonstration sport event as part of the 1986 Commonwealth Games.
