= 2002 Thomas Cup qualification =

Tournament details
- Dates: 13 November 2001 – 24 February 2002
- Venue: Oceania zone: Altona Badminton Centre; American zone: Coliseo de la Ciudad Deportiva; European zone: Indoor-Sportcentrum Eindhoven
- Location: Oceania zone: Melbourne; American zone: Havana; European zone: Eindhoven

The qualifying process for the 2002 Thomas Cup took place from 13 November 2001 to 24 February 2002 to decide the final teams which will play in the final tournament.

== Qualification process ==
The qualification process was divided into two regions, the Oceania Zone and the European Zone. Teams in their respective zone will first compete in a round-robin elimination format. Seeded teams received a bye into the second round while unseeded teams competed in the first round for a place in the second round. Teams in the second round competed for a place in the knockout stages. Semi-final winners in each zone were guaranteed qualification for the final tournament to be held in Guangzhou while the remaining teams competed in a third place playoff match for a place in the final tournament.

Indonesia qualified for the final tournament as defending champions while China qualified as hosts.

=== Qualified teams ===
Country	Qualified as	Qualified on	Final appearance
China	2002 Thomas Cup hosts	January 2002	11th
Indonesia	2000 Thomas Cup winners	21 May 2000	19th
Malaysia	Oceania Zone winners	24 February 2002	19th
South Korea	Oceania Zone runners-up	24 February 2002	10th
Thailand	Oceania Zone third place	24 February 2002	8th
Denmark	European Zone winners	24 February 2002	22nd
Germany	European Zone runners-up	24 February 2002	Debut
Sweden	Third place in European Zone	24 February 2002	10th

== Oceania Zone ==
The qualification rounds for the Oceania Zone were held from 20 to 24 February at the Altona Badminton Centre (formerly Altona Hall) in Melbourne, Australia. Nine teams took part in the competition.

=== Group stage ===
==== Group A ====
Pos	Team	Pld	W	L	MF	MA	MD	GF	GA	GD	PF	PA	PD	Pts	Qualification
1	Malaysia	4	4	0	19	1	+18	59	7	+52	439	183	+256	4	Advance to Knockout stage
2	Japan	4	3	1	12	8	+4	41	34	+7	392	355	+37	3	Advance to Knockout stage
3	Singapore	4	2	2	11	9	+2	37	33	+4	342	335	+7	2	
4	Hong Kong	4	1	3	6	14	−8	25	45	−20	295	386	−91	1	
5	Australia	4	0	4	2	18	−16	14	57	−43	242	451	−209	0	

Source: Badminton Australia

Australia
2
Altona Badminton Centre
20 February 2002, 12:00 UTC+11

Hong Kong
3

			1	2	3	4	5
1	(Australia) (Hong Kong)	Stuart Brehaut; Agus Hariyanto	3; 7	7; 1	2; 7	1; 7
2	(Australia) (Hong Kong)	Ashley Brehaut / Travis Denney; Liu Kwok Wa / Albertus Susanto Njoto	7; 4	6; 8	2; 7	1; 7
3	(Australia) (Hong Kong)	Nathan Malpass; Ng Wei	5; 7	1; 7	2; 7
4	(Australia) (Hong Kong)	Peter Blackburn / Boyd Cooper; Lam Hoi Tak / Wong Tsz Yin	7; 2	5; 7	7; 5	7; 0
5	(Australia) (Hong Kong)	Stuart Gomez; Tam Lok Tin	7; 5	7; 2	2; 7	0; 7	7; 2

Malaysia
5
Altona Badminton Centre
20 February 2002, 12:00 UTC+11

Singapore
0

			1	2	3	4	5
1	(Malaysia) (Singapore)	Wong Choong Hann; Indra Wijaya	7; 1	7; 2	7; 2
2	(Malaysia) (Singapore)	Chan Chong Ming / Chew Choon Eng; Hendri Saputra / Wandry Saputra	7; 0	7; 0	7; 2
3	(Malaysia) (Singapore)	Roslin Hashim; Ronald Susilo	7; 3	7; 1	7; 1
4	(Malaysia) (Singapore)	Chang Kim Wai / Hong Chieng Hun; Patrick Lau / Dicky Purwotjugiono	7; 5	7; 0	7; 2
5	(Malaysia) (Singapore)	Lee Tsuen Seng; Kendrick Lee	7; 2	7; 0	7; 0

Singapore
4
Altona Badminton Centre
20 February 2002, 18:30 UTC+11

Hong Kong
1

			1	2	3	4	5
1	(Singapore) (Hong Kong)	Indra Wijaya; Agus Hariyanto	7; 5	7; 8	7; 4	1; 7	7; 3
2	(Singapore) (Hong Kong)	Patrick Lau / Hendri Saputra; Liu Kwok Wa / Albertus Susanto Njoto	7; 4	5; 7	1; 7	3; 7
3	(Singapore) (Hong Kong)	Ronald Susilo; Ng Wei	7; 3	7; 4	8; 7
4	(Singapore) (Hong Kong)	Dicky Purwotjugiono / Wandry Saputra; Agus Hariyanto / Wong Tsz Yin	8; 6	7; 1	7; 1
5	(Singapore) (Hong Kong)	Hendra Wijaya; Tam Lok Tin	7; 0	7; 0	7; 0

Australia
0
Altona Badminton Centre
20 February 2002, 18:30 UTC+11

Japan
5

			1	2	3	4	5
1	(Australia) (Japan)	Stuart Brehaut; Shōji Satō	1; 7	1; 7	4; 7
2	(Australia) (Japan)	Nathan Malpass; Shinya Ōtsuka	3; 7	7; 6	6; 7	5; 7
3	(Australia) (Japan)	Murray Hocking; Yousuke Nakanishi	4; 7	7; 4	3; 7	0; 7
4	(Australia) (Japan)	Ashley Brehaut / Travis Denney; Yuzo Kubota / Norio Imai	8; 7	2; 7	5; 7	0; 7
5	(Australia) (Japan)	Peter Blackburn / Murray Hocking; Keita Masuda / Tadashi Ōtsuka	2; 7	8; 6	4; 7	2; 7

Japan
1
Altona Badminton Centre
21 February 2002, 14:00 UTC+11

Malaysia
4

			1	2	3	4	5
1	(Japan) (Malaysia)	Shōji Satō; Ong Ewe Hock	0; 7	8; 6	3; 7	1; 7
2	(Japan) (Malaysia)	Keita Masuda / Tadashi Ōtsuka; Chan Chong Ming / Chew Choon Eng	2; 7	0; 7	3; 7
3	(Japan) (Malaysia)	Shinya Ōtsuka; Roslin Hashim	0; 7	8; 6	7; 8	7; 0
4	(Japan) (Malaysia)	Takuya Katayama / Yuzo Kubota; Chang Kim Wai / Hong Chieng Hun	6; 8	3; 7	7; 3	2; 7
5	(Japan) (Malaysia)	Yousuke Nakanishi; Lee Tsuen Seng	5; 7	7; 3	5; 7	0; 7

Singapore
5
Altona Badminton Centre
21 February 2002, 14:00 UTC+11

Australia
0

			1	2	3	4	5
1	(Singapore) (Australia)	Indra Wijaya; Stuart Brehaut	7; 2	7; 1	7; 1
2	(Singapore) (Australia)	Patrick Lau / Hendri Saputra; Peter Blackburn / Murray Hocking	7; 5	7; 5	7; 1
3	(Singapore) (Australia)	Ronald Susilo; Nathan Malpass	7; 2	7; 4	7; 2
4	(Singapore) (Australia)	Dicky Purwotjugiono / Wandry Saputra; Ashley Brehaut / Travis Denney	7; 1	7; 4	4; 7	7; 3
5	(Singapore) (Australia)	Hendra Wijaya; Stuart Gomez	8; 7	7; 1	2; 7	7; 0

Hong Kong
2
Altona Badminton Centre
22 February 2002, 10:00 UTC+11

Japan
3

			1	2	3	4	5
1	(Hong Kong) (Japan)	Agus Hariyanto; Shōji Satō	7; 2	7; 3	7; 0
2	(Hong Kong) (Japan)	Ng Wei; Yousuke Nakanishi	7; 2	7; 3	7; 0
3	(Hong Kong) (Japan)	Tam Lok Tin; Keita Masuda	2; 7	0; 7	4; 7
4	(Hong Kong) (Japan)	Agus Hariyanto / Wong Tsz Yin; Takuya Katayama / Yuzo Kubota	0; 7	1; 7	8; 7	3; 7
5	(Hong Kong) (Japan)	Liu Kwok Wa / Albertus Susanto Njoto; Keita Masuda / Tadashi Ōtsuka	4; 7	2; 7	0; 7

Australia
0
Altona Badminton Centre
22 February 2002, 14:00 UTC+11

Malaysia
5

			1	2	3	4	5
1	(Australia) (Malaysia)	Stuart Brehaut; Wong Choong Hann	3; 7	1; 7	1; 7
2	(Australia) (Malaysia)	Ashley Brehaut / Travis Denney; Chan Chong Ming / Chew Choon Eng	0; 7	1; 7	1; 7
3	(Australia) (Malaysia)	Nathan Malpass; Ong Ewe Hock	3; 7	2; 7	5; 7
4	(Australia) (Malaysia)	Boyd Cooper / Murray Hocking; Gan Teik Chai / Mohd Fairuzizuan Tazari	2; 7	2; 7	5; 7
5	(Australia) (Malaysia)	Stuart Gomez; Lee Tsuen Seng	2; 7	0; 7	4; 7

Hong Kong
0
Altona Badminton Centre
22 February 2002, 18:30 UTC+11

Malaysia
5

			1	2	3	4	5
1	(Hong Kong) (Malaysia)	Agus Hariyanto; Wong Choong Hann	2; 7	1; 7	1; 7
2	(Hong Kong) (Malaysia)	Liu Kwok Wa / Albertus Susanto Njoto; Chan Chong Ming / Chew Choon Eng	4; 7	4; 7	5; 7
3	(Hong Kong) (Malaysia)	Ng Wei; Ong Ewe Hock	8; 6	5; 7	5; 7	4; 7
4	(Hong Kong) (Malaysia)	Lam Hoi Tak / Wong Tsz Yin; Chang Kim Wai / Hong Chieng Hun	0; 7	2; 7	1; 7
5	(Hong Kong) (Malaysia)	Tam Lok Tin; Lee Tsuen Seng	1; 7	3; 7	3; 7

Singapore
2
Altona Badminton Centre
22 February 2002, 18:30 UTC+11

Japan
3

			1	2	3	4	5
1	(Singapore) (Japan)	Indra Wijaya; Shōji Satō	7; 1	7; 4	7; 8	0; 7	2; 7
2	(Singapore) (Japan)	Ronald Susilo; Shinya Ōtsuka	7; 3	7; 2	7; 3
3	(Singapore) (Japan)	Hendra Wijaya; Keita Masuda	7; 2	3; 7	6; 8	5; 7
4	(Singapore) (Japan)	Dicky Purwotjugiono / Hendri Saputra; Takuya Katayama / Yuzo Kubota	4; 7	7; 3	7; 3	0; 7	7; 3
5	(Singapore) (Japan)	Patrick Lau / Wandri Saputra; Keita Masuda / Tadashi Ōtsuka	1; 7	4; 7	4; 7

==== Group B ====
Pos	Team	Pld	W	L	MF	MA	MD	GF	GA	GD	PF	PA	PD	Pts	Qualification
1	South Korea	3	3	0	14	1	+13	44	4	+40	328	105	+223	3	Advance to Knockout stage
2	Thailand	3	2	1	8	7	+1	27	24	+3	262	221	+41	2	Advance to Knockout stage
3	Chinese Taipei	3	1	2	8	7	+1	28	26	+2	267	245	+22	1	
4	Macau	3	0	3	0	15	−15	0	45	−45	29	315	−286	0	

Source: Badminton Australia

Macau
0
Altona Badminton Centre
20 February 2002, 15:00 UTC+11

Thailand
5

			1	2	3	4	5
1	(Macau) (Thailand)	Leong Kin Fai; Boonsak Ponsana	0; 7	1; 7	0; 7
2	(Macau) (Thailand)	Lei Keng Chon / Wan Sze Ming; Tesana Panvisvas / Khunakorn Sudhisodhi	1; 7	2; 7	0; 7
3	(Macau) (Thailand)	O Man Tung; Anuphap Theeraratsakul	1; 7	2; 7	1; 7
4	(Macau) (Thailand)	Chan Io Chong / Kuok Fei Pang; Patapol Ngernsrisuk / Sudket Prapakamol	0; 7	1; 7	0; 7
5	(Macau) (Thailand)	Joaquim Lobo; Jakrapan Thanathiratham	0; 7	0; 7	1; 7

Chinese Taipei
1
Altona Badminton Centre
20 February 2002, 15:00 UTC+11

South Korea
4

			1	2	3	4	5
1	(Chinese Taipei) (South Korea)	Fung Permadi; Lee Hyun-il	1; 7	1; 7	1; 7
2	(Chinese Taipei) (South Korea)	Liao Sheng-shiun; Shon Seung-mo	4; 7	1; 7	3; 7
3	(Chinese Taipei) (South Korea)	Chien Yu-hsiu; Park Tae-sang	3; 7	2; 7	7; 4	7; 3	7; 4
4	(Chinese Taipei) (South Korea)	Hu Chung-hsien / Lee Wei-jen; Ha Tae-kwon / Kim Dong-moon	2; 7	8; 7	4; 7	0; 7
5	(Chinese Taipei) (South Korea)	Chien Yu-hsun / Huang Shih-chung; Lee Dong-soo / Yoo Yong-sung	1; 7	4; 7	2; 7

Macau
0
Altona Badminton Centre
21 February 2002, 18:30 UTC+11

South Korea
5

			1	2	3	4	5
1	(Macau) (South Korea)	Leong Kin Fai; Park Tae-sang	1; 7	0; 7	0; 7
2	(Macau) (South Korea)	O Man Tung; Jang Young-soo	0; 7	0; 7	1; 7
3	(Macau) (South Korea)	Chan Io Chong; Lee Dong-soo	0; 7	2; 7	1; 7
4	(Macau) (South Korea)	Lei Keng Chon / Wan Sze Ming; Ha Tae-kwon / Kim Dong-moon	0; 7	2; 7	0; 7
5	(Macau) (South Korea)	Chan Io Chong / Kuok Fei Pang; Lee Hyun-il / Yoo Yong-sung	0; 7	1; 7	0; 7

Thailand
3
Altona Badminton Centre
21 February 2002, 18:30 UTC+11

Chinese Taipei
2

			1	2	3	4	5
1	(Thailand) (Chinese Taipei)	Boonsak Ponsana; Fung Permadi	3; 7	7; 3	7; 2	8; 7
2	(Thailand) (Chinese Taipei)	Tesana Panvisvas / Pramote Teerawiwatana; Chien Yu-hsun / Huang Shih-chung	7; 3	6; 8	7; 4	4; 7	7; 4
3	(Thailand) (Chinese Taipei)	Anuphap Theeraratsakul; Liao Sheng-shiun	7; 0	7; 3	8; 6
4	(Thailand) (Chinese Taipei)	Patapol Ngernsrisuk / Khunakorn Sudhisodhi; Hu Chung-hsien / Lee Wei-jen	4; 7	7; 0	6; 8	5; 7
5	(Thailand) (Chinese Taipei)	Jakrapan Thanathiratham; Chien Yu-hsiu	7; 5	7; 2	4; 7	0; 7	0; 7

Thailand
0
Altona Badminton Centre
22 February 2002, 10:00 UTC+11

South Korea
5

			1	2	3	4	5
1	(Thailand) (South Korea)	Boonsak Ponsana; Lee Hyun-il	6; 8	4; 7	0; 7
2	(Thailand) (South Korea)	Anupap Theeraratsakul; Shon Seung-mo	4; 7	4; 7	0; 7
3	(Thailand) (South Korea)	Sudket Prapakamol; Park Tae-sang	3; 7	2; 7	1; 7
4	(Thailand) (South Korea)	Patapol Ngernsrisuk / Khunakorn Sudhisodhi; Lee Dong-soo / Yoo Yong-sung	5; 7	0; 7	6; 8
5	(Thailand) (South Korea)	Sudket Prapakamol / Jakrapan Thanathiratham; Ha Tae-kwon / Kim Dong-moon	2; 7	2; 7	0; 7

Chinese Taipei
5
Altona Badminton Centre
22 February 2002, 14:00 UTC+11

Macau
0

			1	2	3	4	5
1	(Chinese Taipei) (Macau)	Fung Permadi; Leong Kin Fai	7; 0	7; 0	7; 0
2	(Chinese Taipei) (Macau)	Chien Yu-hsun / Huang Shih-chung; Joaquim Lobo / O Man Tung	7; 0	7; 0	7; 0
3	(Chinese Taipei) (Macau)	Liao Sheng-shiun; Chan Io Chong	7; 3	7; 0	7; 2
4	(Chinese Taipei) (Macau)	Hu Chung-hsien / Lee Wei-jen; Lei Keng Chon / Wan Sze Ming	7; 0	7; 1	7; 2
5	(Chinese Taipei) (Macau)	Chien Yu-hsiu; Kuok Fei Pang	7; 1	7; 1	7; 0

=== Knockout stage ===
Semi-finals
Malaysia	3
Thailand	0
Japan	0
South Korea	3

Final
Malaysia	3
South Korea	0
Third place
Thailand	3
Japan	2

==== Semi-finals ====
Malaysia
3
Altona Badminton Centre
23 February 2002, 14:00 UTC+11

Thailand
0

			1	2	3	4	5
1	(Malaysia) (Thailand)	Wong Choong Hann; Boonsak Ponsana	7; 1	7; 4	7; 1
2	(Malaysia) (Thailand)	Chan Chong Ming / Chew Choon Eng; Tesana Panvisvas / Pramote Teerawiwatana	7; 8	7; 5	7; 5	7; 5
3	(Malaysia) (Thailand)	Ong Ewe Hock; Anuphap Theeraratsakul	7; 0	0; 7	7; 3	7; 1
4	(Malaysia) (Thailand)	Chang Kim Wai / Hong Chieng Hun; Patapol Ngernsrisuk / Khunakorn Sudhisodhi						not played
5	(Malaysia) (Thailand)	Lee Tsuen Seng; Jakrapan Thanathiratham						not played

South Korea
3
Altona Badminton Centre
23 February 2002, 18:30 UTC+11

Japan
0

			1	2	3	4	5
1	(South Korea) (Japan)	Lee Hyun-il; Shōji Satō	7; 1	7; 5	7; 0
2	(South Korea) (Japan)	Lee Dong-soo / Yoo Yong-sung; Keita Masuda / Tadashi Ōtsuka	7; 4	7; 1	7; 5
3	(South Korea) (Japan)	Shon Seung-mo; Shinya Ōtsuka	7; 1	7; 0	7; 5
4	(South Korea) (Japan)	Ha Tae-kwon / Kim Dong-moon; Takuya Katayama / Yuzo Kubota						not played
5	(South Korea) (Japan)	Park Tae-sang; Yousuke Nakanishi						not played

==== Third place ====
Thailand
3
Altona Badminton Centre
24 February 2002, 11:00 UTC+11

Japan
2

			1	2	3	4	5
1	(Thailand) (Japan)	Boonsak Ponsana; Shōji Satō	7; 0	6; 8	7; 5	1; 7	6; 8
2	(Thailand) (Japan)	Anuphap Theeraratsakul; Yousuke Nakanishi	7; 4	7; 0	7; 4
3	(Thailand) (Japan)	Jakrapan Thanathiratham; Keita Masuda	1; 7	5; 7	7; 4	7; 3	3; 7
4	(Thailand) (Japan)	Patapol Ngernsrisuk / Khunakorn Sudhisodhi; Takuya Katayama / Yuzo Kubota	4; 7	7; 1	7; 3	7; 2
5	(Thailand) (Japan)	Tesana Panvisvas / Pramote Teerawiwatana; Keita Masuda / Tadashi Ōtsuka	7; 2	7; 5	7; 0

==== Final ====
Malaysia
3
Altona Badminton Centre
24 February 2002, 14:30 UTC+11

South Korea
0

			1	2	3	4	5
1	(Malaysia) (South Korea)	Wong Choong Hann; Lee Hyun-il	7; 2	5; 7	0; 7	7; 4	7; 4
2	(Malaysia) (South Korea)	Chan Chong Ming / Chew Choon Eng; Lee Dong-soo / Yoo Yong-sung	7; 3	8; 7	4; 7	7; 2
3	(Malaysia) (South Korea)	Ong Ewe Hock; Shon Seung-mo	7; 5	7; 5	1; 7	4; 7	7; 2
4	(Malaysia) (South Korea)	Chang Kim Wai / Hong Chieng Hun; Ha Tae-kwon / Kim Dong-moon						not played
5	(Malaysia) (South Korea)	Lee Tsuen Seng; Park Tae-sang						not played

== American Zone ==
The qualification rounds for the American Zone were held from 13 to 16 November 2001 at the Coliseo de la Ciudad Deportiva in Havana, Cuba. Six teams took part in the competition. The winner of the American Zone will advance to the second round of the European Zone in Eindhoven.

=== Group stage ===
==== Group A ====
Pos	Team	Pld	W	L	MF	MA	MD	GF	GA	GD	PF	PA	PD	Pts	Qualification
1	United States	2	2	0	9	1	+8	28	4	+24	218	94	+124	2	Advance to final
2	Cuba	2	1	1	6	4	+2	19	13	+6	173	158	+15	1	Advance to third place playoff
3	Barbados	2	0	2	0	10	−10	0	30	−30	77	216	−139	0	Advance to classification round

Source: World Badminton

Cuba
5
Coliseo de la Ciudad Deportiva
13 November 2001, 18:00 UTC−5

Barbados
0

			1	2	3	4	5
1	(Cuba) (Barbados)	Lázaro Jerez; Ryan Holder	7; 2	7; 3	7; 1
2	(Cuba) (Barbados)	Raicel Acosta; Andre Padmore	7; 2	7; 5	8; 6
3	(Cuba) (Barbados)	Yunier Álvarez; Corey Jackman	7; 0	7; 2	7; 0
4	(Cuba) (Barbados)	Yunier Álvarez / Alexander Hernandez; Curwin Cherubin / Andre Padmore	8; 7	7; 2	7; 2
5	(Cuba) (Barbados)	Raicel Acosta / Lázaro Jerez; Ansley Edey / Corey Jackman	7; 2	3; 7	7; 2	7; 3

United States
5
Coliseo de la Ciudad Deportiva
14 November 2001, 18:00 UTC−5

Barbados
0

			1	2	3	4	5
1	(United States) (Barbados)	Kevin Han; Ryan Holder	7; 2	7; 1	7; 0
2	(United States) (Barbados)	Eric Go; Andre Padmore	8; 6	7; 1	7; 3
3	(United States) (Barbados)	Khan Malaythong; Curwin Cherubin	7; 3	7; 2	7; 2
4	(United States) (Barbados)	Howard Bach / Amarit Rojsirivit; Curwin Cherubin / Andre Padmore	7; 1	7; 2	7; 1
5	(United States) (Barbados)	Eric Go / Khan Malaythong; Andrew Clarke / Corey Jackman	7; 2	7; 1	7; 4

United States
4
Coliseo de la Ciudad Deportiva
16 November 2001, 09:00 UTC−5

Cuba
1

			1	2	3	4	5
1	(United States) (Cuba)	Kevin Han; Lázaro Jerez	7; 0	7; 0	7; 0
2	(United States) (Cuba)	Eric Go; Raicel Acosta	7; 1	7; 4	7; 3
3	(United States) (Cuba)	Howard Bach; Yunier Álvarez	7; 2	4; 7	7; 4	8; 7
4	(United States) (Cuba)	Howard Bach / Amarit Rojsirivit; Yunier Álvarez / Alexander Hernandez	6; 8	7; 8	7; 3	2; 7
5	(United States) (Cuba)	Kevin Han / Khan Malaythong; Raicel Acosta / Óscar Pérez	7; 1	7; 2	8; 6

==== Group B ====
Pos	Team	Pld	W	L	MF	MA	MD	GF	GA	GD	PF	PA	PD	Pts	Qualification
1	Italy	2	2	0	10	0	+10	30	2	+28	220	72	+148	2	Advance to final
2	Jamaica	2	1	1	5	5	0	17	15	+2	166	136	+30	1	Advance to third place playoff
3	Puerto Rico	2	0	2	0	10	−10	0	30	−30	33	211	−178	0	Advance to fifth place playoff

Source: World Badminton

Italy
5
Coliseo de la Ciudad Deportiva
13 November 2001, 18:00 UTC−5

Puerto Rico
0

			1	2	3	4	5
1	(Italy) (Puerto Rico)	Cristiano Bevilacqua; Angel Santana	7; 1	7; 0	7; 1
2	(Italy) (Puerto Rico)	Klaus Raffeiner; Victor Pérez	7; 1	7; 1	7; 1
3	(Italy) (Puerto Rico)	Ying Liyong; Julio Díaz	7; 0	7; 1	7; 0
4	(Italy) (Puerto Rico)	Christian Bernhard / Cristiano Bevilacqua; Luis Orraca / Victor Pérez	7; 0	7; 2	7; 2
5	(Italy) (Puerto Rico)	Klaus Raffeiner / Ying Liyong; Julio Díaz / Victor Fuentes	7; 1	7; 0	7; 1

Jamaica
5
Coliseo de la Ciudad Deportiva
14 November 2001, 18:00 UTC−5

Puerto Rico
0

			1	2	3	4	5
1	(Jamaica) (Puerto Rico)	Charles Pyne; Angel Santana	7; 1	7; 0	7; 2
2	(Jamaica) (Puerto Rico)	Bradley Graham; Victor Pérez	8; 6	7; 2	7; 5
3	(Jamaica) (Puerto Rico)	Roy Paul Jr. Julio Díaz	7; 0	7; 1	7; 0
4	(Jamaica) (Puerto Rico)	Bradley Graham / Charles Pyne; Luis Orraca / Angel Santana	7; 2	7; 0	7; 1
5	(Jamaica) (Puerto Rico)	Albert Myles / Roy Paul Jr. Julio Díaz / Victor Fuentes	7; 0	7; 0	7; 1

Italy
5
Coliseo de la Ciudad Deportiva
16 November 2001, 09:00 UTC−5

Jamaica
0

			1	2	3	4	5
1	(Italy) (Jamaica)	Cristiano Bevilacqua; Charles Pyne	7; 0	7; 1	7; 3
2	(Italy) (Jamaica)	Klaus Raffeiner; Bradley Graham	7; 4	7; 3	6; 8	7; 3
3	(Italy) (Jamaica)	Ying Liyong; Albert Myles	7; 5	7; 0	7; 0
4	(Italy) (Jamaica)	Christian Bernhard / Cristiano Bevilacqua; Paul Leyow / Charles Pyne	8; 6	7; 4	2; 7	7; 4
5	(Italy) (Jamaica)	Klaus Raffeiner / Ying Liyong; Bradley Graham / Albert Myles	7; 5	7; 0	8; 7

=== Classification round ===
==== Fifth place ====
Barbados
3
Coliseo de la Ciudad Deportiva
16 November 2001, 18:00 UTC−5

Puerto Rico
2

			1	2	3	4	5
1	(Barbados) (Puerto Rico)	Ryan Holder; Angel Santana	7; 1	7; 2	7; 4
2	(Barbados) (Puerto Rico)	Andre Padmore; Victor Pérez	7; 1	3; 7	7; 4	5; 7	5; 7
3	(Barbados) (Puerto Rico)	Curwin Cherubin; Victor Fuentes	7; 0	7; 3	7; 1
4	(Barbados) (Puerto Rico)	Andrew Clarke / Corey Jackman; Victor Pérez / Angel Santana	8; 6	4; 7	0; 7	1; 7
5	(Barbados) (Puerto Rico)	Curwin Cherubin / Ryan Holder; Julio Díaz / Victor Fuentes	7; 0	7; 0	7; 0

==== Third place ====
Cuba
3
Coliseo de la Ciudad Deportiva
16 November 2001, 18:00 UTC−5

Jamaica
2

			1	2	3	4	5
1	(Cuba) (Jamaica)	Lázaro Jerez; Charles Pyne	2; 7	3; 7	7; 3	7; 1	7; 3
2	(Cuba) (Jamaica)	Raicel Acosta; Bradley Graham	6; 8	7; 5	1; 7	3; 7
3	(Cuba) (Jamaica)	Yunier Álvarez; Albert Myles	7; 4	7; 1	7; 2
4	(Cuba) (Jamaica)	Yunier Álvarez / Alexander Hernandez; Paul Leyow / Charles Pyne	3; 7	3; 7	2; 7
5	(Cuba) (Jamaica)	Raicel Acosta / Lázaro Jerez; Bradley Graham / Albert Myles	7; 2	7; 0	4; 7	8; 6

=== Final ===
United States
3
Coliseo de la Ciudad Deportiva
16 November 2001, 15:00 UTC−5

Italy
1

			1	2	3	4	5
1	(United States) (Italy)	Kevin Han; Klaus Raffeiner	7; 4	7; 2	7; 2
2	(United States) (Italy)	Khan Malaythong; Ying Liyong	8; 6	2; 7	8; 6	3; 7	3; 7
3	(United States) (Italy)	Howard Bach; Zhou You	7; 2	3; 7	6; 7	7; 2	7; 2
4	(United States) (Italy)	Howard Bach / Amarit Rojsirivit; Cristiano Bevilacqua / Ying Liyong	7; 1	7; 1	7; 1
5	(United States) (Italy)	Kevin Han / Khan Malaythong; Christian Bernhard / Klaus Raffeiner						not played

== European Zone ==
The European Zone qualifying rounds were held from 17 to 24 February at the Indoor-Sportcentrum Eindhoven in Eindhoven, Netherlands.

=== First round ===
==== Group A ====
Pos	Team	Pld	W	L	MF	MA	MD	GF	GA	GD	PF	PA	PD	Pts	Qualification
1	Scotland	3	3	0	13	2	+11	42	12	+30	337	175	+162	3	Advance to second round
2	Iceland	3	2	1	10	5	+5	35	20	+15	309	227	+82	2	
3	Greece	3	1	2	5	10	−5	18	37	−19	216	321	−105	1	
4	Brazil	3	0	3	2	13	−11	14	40	−26	193	332	−139	0	

Source: toernooi.nl

Scotland
5
Indoor-Sportcentrum Eindhoven
17 February 2002, 14:30 UTC+1

Greece
0

			1	2	3	4	5
1	(Scotland) (Greece)	Graham Simpson; Theodoros Velkos	7; 2	4; 7	7; 2	7; 0
2	(Scotland) (Greece)	Graeme Smith; Pavlos Charalambidis	7; 2	7; 5	7; 5
3	(Scotland) (Greece)	Alistair Casey; Christos Tsartsidis	7; 1	7; 0	7; 3
4	(Scotland) (Greece)	Russell Hogg / Graeme Smith; George Patis / Theodoros Velkos	7; 5	7; 3	7; 3
5	(Scotland) (Greece)	Alastair Gatt / Craig Robertson; Pavlos Charalambidis / Christos Tsartsidis	7; 0	2; 7	7; 2	7; 2

Iceland
5
Indoor-Sportcentrum Eindhoven
17 February 2002, 14:30 UTC+1

Brazil
0

			1	2	3	4	5
1	(Iceland) (Brazil)	Tómas Viborg; Guilherme Kumasaka	7; 1	3; 7	7; 3	7; 0
2	(Iceland) (Brazil)	Sveinn Sölvason; Guilherme Pardo	6; 8	7; 1	7; 2	7; 5
3	(Iceland) (Brazil)	Njörður Ludvigsson; Ricardo Trevelin	7; 4	7; 1	7; 1
4	(Iceland) (Brazil)	Sveinn Sölvason / Tómas Viborg; Lucas Araújo / Guilherme Kumasaka	7; 4	8; 6	7; 4
5	(Iceland) (Brazil)	Helgi Jóhannesson / Njörður Ludvigsson; Guilherme Pardo / Ricardo Trevelin	7; 3	7; 1	7; 0

Iceland
3
Indoor-Sportcentrum Eindhoven
18 February 2002, 14:30 UTC+1

Greece
2

			1	2	3	4	5
1	(Iceland) (Greece)	Tómas Viborg; Theodoros Velkos	7; 1	7; 3	4; 7	3; 7	3; 7
2	(Iceland) (Greece)	Sveinn Sölvason; Pavlos Charalambidis	5; 7	2; 7	7; 4	7; 2	5; 7
3	(Iceland) (Greece)	Helgi Jóhannesson; Christos Tsartsidis	7; 0	8; 6	7; 1
4	(Iceland) (Greece)	Helgi Jóhannesson / Njörður Ludvigsson; George Patis / Theodoros Velkos	7; 1	7; 1	7; 3
5	(Iceland) (Greece)	Sveinn Sölvason / Tómas Viborg; Pavlos Charalambidis / Christos Tsartsidis	7; 0	7; 0	7; 5

Scotland
5
Indoor-Sportcentrum Eindhoven
18 February 2002, 14:30 UTC+1

Brazil
0

			1	2	3	4	5
1	(Scotland) (Brazil)	Graham Simpson; Guilherme Kumasaka	7; 0	6; 8	7; 3	7; 0
2	(Scotland) (Brazil)	Graeme Smith; Guilherme Pardo	7; 2	2; 7	7; 0	7; 2
3	(Scotland) (Brazil)	Alistair Casey; Ricardo Trevelin	7; 0	5; 7	7; 2	8; 6
4	(Scotland) (Brazil)	Alastair Gatt / Craig Robertson; Lucas Araújo / Guilherme Kumasaka	7; 0	7; 0	7; 0
5	(Scotland) (Brazil)	Russell Hogg / Graeme Smith; Guilherme Pardo / Ricardo Trevelin	7; 1	7; 4	7; 4

Greece
3
Indoor-Sportcentrum Eindhoven
19 February 2002, 14:30 UTC+1

Brazil
2

			1	2	3	4	5
1	(Greece) (Brazil)	Theodoros Velkos; Guilherme Kumasaka	7; 2	7; 1	7; 5
2	(Greece) (Brazil)	Pavlos Charalambidis; Guilherme Pardo	7; 4	5; 7	7; 5	5; 7	7; 5
3	(Greece) (Brazil)	Christos Tsartsidis; Ricardo Trevelin	1; 7	3; 7	3; 7
4	(Greece) (Brazil)	George Patis / Theodoros Velkos; Guilherme Pardo / Ricardo Trevelin	3; 7	7; 3	7; 1	7; 5
5	(Greece) (Brazil)	Pavlos Charalambidis / Christos Tsartsidis; Lucas Araújo / Guilherme Kumasaka	7; 2	1; 7	5; 7	2; 7

Scotland
3
Indoor-Sportcentrum Eindhoven
19 February 2002, 14:30 UTC+1

Iceland
2

			1	2	3	4	5
1	(Scotland) (Iceland)	Graham Simpson; Tómas Viborg	7; 1	6; 8	2; 7	7; 2	1; 7
2	(Scotland) (Iceland)	Graeme Smith; Helgi Jóhannesson	3; 7	5; 7	8; 7	2; 7
3	(Scotland) (Iceland)	Craig Robertson; Njörður Ludvigsson	7; 3	7; 0	7; 2
4	(Scotland) (Iceland)	Russell Hogg / Graeme Smith; Helgi Jóhannesson / Njörður Ludvigsson	7; 0	7; 3	7; 3
5	(Scotland) (Iceland)	Alastair Gatt / Craig Robertson; Sveinn Sölvason / Tómas Viborg	7; 2	3; 7	7; 4	7; 3

==== Group B ====
Pos	Team	Pld	W	L	MF	MA	MD	GF	GA	GD	PF	PA	PD	Pts	Qualification
1	Wales	3	3	0	14	1	+13	43	8	+35	329	159	+170	3	Advance to second round
2	Slovenia	3	2	1	11	4	+7	35	19	+16	304	236	+68	2	
3	Peru	3	1	2	4	11	−7	18	36	−18	214	297	−83	1	
4	Israel	3	0	3	1	14	−13	9	42	−33	172	327	−155	0	

Source: toernooi.nl

Wales
4
Indoor-Sportcentrum Eindhoven
17 February 2002, 18:15 UTC+1

Slovenia
1

			1	2	3	4	5
1	(Wales) (Slovenia)	Richard Vaughan; Andrej Pohar	7; 3	7; 0	7; 4
2	(Wales) (Slovenia)	Martyn Lewis; Miha Šepec	8; 7	1; 7	7; 0	7; 0
3	(Wales) (Slovenia)	Matthew Hughes; Denis Peshehonov	1; 7	8; 7	2; 7	5; 7
4	(Wales) (Slovenia)	Matthew Hughes / Richard Vaughan; Aleš Murn / Andrej Pohar	7; 1	0; 7	7; 1	7; 5
5	(Wales) (Slovenia)	Neil Cottrill / Chris Rees; Miha Horvat / Denis Peshehonov	7; 2	7; 4	7; 0

Israel
1
Indoor-Sportcentrum Eindhoven
17 February 2002, 18:15 UTC+1

Peru
4

			1	2	3	4	5
1	(Israel) (Peru)	Nir Yusim; Mario Carulla	1; 7	7; 1	7; 3	1; 7	1; 7
2	(Israel) (Peru)	Shai Geffen; Rodrigo Pacheco	1; 7	4; 7	0; 7
3	(Israel) (Peru)	Barak Meayon; Guillermo Perea	6; 8	0; 7	0; 7
4	(Israel) (Peru)	Leon Pougatch / Nir Yusim; Andrés Corpancho / Rodrigo Pacheco	7; 3	8; 6	7; 0
5	(Israel) (Peru)	Yoni Azran / Shai Geffen; Mario Carulla / Guillermo Perea	1; 7	7; 3	2; 7	1; 7

Israel
0
Indoor-Sportcentrum Eindhoven
18 February 2002, 18:00 UTC+1

Slovenia
5

			1	2	3	4	5
1	(Israel) (Slovenia)	Nir Yusim; Andrej Pohar	1; 7	5; 7	7; 3	4; 7
2	(Israel) (Slovenia)	Shai Geffen; Miha Šepec	5; 7	3; 7	1; 7
3	(Israel) (Slovenia)	Barak Meayon; Aleš Murn	6; 8	4; 7	0; 7
4	(Israel) (Slovenia)	Yoni Azran / Shai Geffen; Denis Peshehonov / Miha Horvat	4; 7	5; 7	5; 7
5	(Israel) (Slovenia)	Leon Pougatch / Nir Yusim; Andrej Pohar / Aleš Murn	8; 6	4; 7	7; 8	1; 7

Wales
5
Indoor-Sportcentrum Eindhoven
18 February 2002, 18:00 UTC+1

Peru
0

			1	2	3	4	5
1	(Wales) (Peru)	Richard Vaughan; Mario Carulla	7; 0	7; 0	8; 6
2	(Wales) (Peru)	Martyn Lewis; Rodrigo Pacheco	8; 7	6; 8	7; 1	7; 4
3	(Wales) (Peru)	Matthew Hughes; Andrés Corpancho	4; 7	7; 0	7; 3	4; 7	7; 4
4	(Wales) (Peru)	Neil Cottrill / Chris Rees; Mario Carulla / Guillermo Perea	7; 2	7; 2	7; 1
5	(Wales) (Peru)	Matthew Hughes / Richard Vaughan; Andrés Corpancho / Rodrigo Pacheco	7; 0	7; 2	7; 2

Slovenia
5
Indoor-Sportcentrum Eindhoven
19 February 2002, 18:00 UTC+1

Peru
0

			1	2	3	4	5
1	(Slovenia) (Peru)	Andrej Pohar; Mario Carulla	7; 4	7; 5	7; 2
2	(Slovenia) (Peru)	Miha Šepec; Rodrigo Pacheco	4; 7	7; 1	7; 2	7; 2
3	(Slovenia) (Peru)	Denis Peshehonov; Guillermo Perea	7; 4	7; 1	7; 0
4	(Slovenia) (Peru)	Aleš Murn / Andrej Pohar; Andrés Corpancho / Rodrigo Pacheco	7; 1	7; 1	7; 1
5	(Slovenia) (Peru)	Miha Horvat / Denis Peshehonov; Mario Carulla / Guillermo Perea	5; 7	7; 5	7; 3	1; 7	7; 4

Wales
5
Indoor-Sportcentrum Eindhoven
19 February 2002, 18:00 UTC+1

Israel
0

			1	2	3	4	5
1	(Wales) (Israel)	Richard Vaughan; Shai Geffen	7; 0	7; 0	7; 1
2	(Wales) (Israel)	Martyn Lewis; Barak Meayon	7; 2	7; 3	7; 2
3	(Wales) (Israel)	Liam Ingram; Yoni Azran	8; 7	7; 0	7; 6
4	(Wales) (Israel)	Neil Cottrill / Chris Rees; Barak Meayon / Shai Geffen	7; 2	7; 0	7; 3
5	(Wales) (Israel)	Matthew Hughes / Richard Vaughan; Yoni Azran / Leon Pougatch	7; 2	7; 2	7; 4

==== Group C ====
Pos	Team	Pld	W	L	MF	MA	MD	GF	GA	GD	PF	PA	PD	Pts	Qualification
1	Poland	3	3	0	13	2	+11	39	11	+28	311	169	+142	3	Advance to second round
2	Belgium	3	2	1	11	4	+7	38	19	+19	320	249	+71	2	
3	Ireland	3	1	2	3	12	−9	19	37	−18	238	314	−76	1	
4	Hungary	3	0	3	3	12	−9	10	39	−29	180	317	−137	0	

Source: toernooi.nl

Belgium
5
Indoor-Sportcentrum Eindhoven
17 February 2002, 11:00 UTC+1

Ireland
0

			1	2	3	4	5
1	(Belgium) (Republic of Ireland)	Ruud Kuijten; Bruce Topping	7; 1	7; 0	7; 0
2	(Belgium) (Republic of Ireland)	Frédéric Mawet; Ciaran Darcy	1; 7	3; 7	7; 4	7; 6	7; 4
3	(Belgium) (Republic of Ireland)	David Jaco; Donal O'Halloran	7; 3	7; 5	4; 7	0; 7	7; 3
4	(Belgium) (Republic of Ireland)	Roel Bollen / Ruud Kuijten; Graham Henderson / Eugene McKenna	7; 3	4; 7	7; 2	7; 0
5	(Belgium) (Republic of Ireland)	Wouter Claes / Frédéric Mawet; Donal O'Halloran / Bruce Topping	7; 4	7; 5	1; 7	0; 7	8; 7

Hungary
0
Indoor-Sportcentrum Eindhoven
17 February 2002, 11:00 UTC+1

Poland
5

			1	2	3	4	5
1	(Hungary) (Poland)	Levente Csiszér; Przemysław Wacha	3; 7	1; 7	6; 8
2	(Hungary) (Poland)	Kristóf Horváth; Jacek Niedźwiedzki	4; 7	1; 7	0; 7
3	(Hungary) (Poland)	Attila Kaposi; Kamil Turonek	1; 7	4; 7	2; 7
4	(Hungary) (Poland)	Levente Csiszér / Kristóf Horváth; Michał Łogosz / Robert Mateusiak	3; 7	1; 7	1; 7
5	(Hungary) (Poland)	András Sinka / Csaba Szikra; Jacek Niedźwiedzki / Przemysław Wacha	1; 7	2; 7	6; 8

Hungary
2
Indoor-Sportcentrum Eindhoven
18 February 2002, 11:00 UTC+1

Ireland
3

			1	2	3	4	5
1	(Hungary) (Republic of Ireland)	Levente Csiszér; Bruce Topping	7; 8	5; 7	7; 3	7; 8
2	(Hungary) (Republic of Ireland)	Kristóf Horváth; Ciaran Darcy	7; 6	5; 7	7; 2	7; 3
3	(Hungary) (Republic of Ireland)	Attila Kaposi; Donal O'Halloran	7; 3	8; 7	7; 0
4	(Hungary) (Republic of Ireland)	András Sinka / Csaba Szikra; Graham Henderson / Eugene McKenna	3; 7	2; 7	2; 7
5	(Hungary) (Republic of Ireland)	Levente Csiszér / Kristóf Horváth; Donal O'Halloran / Bruce Topping	0; 7	0; 7	3; 7

Belgium
2
Indoor-Sportcentrum Eindhoven
18 February 2002, 11:00 UTC+1

Poland
3

			1	2	3	4	5
1	(Belgium) (Poland)	Ruud Kuijten; Przemysław Wacha	8; 6	7; 4	7; 2
2	(Belgium) (Poland)	Wouter Claes; Jacek Niedźwiedzki	7; 2	7; 3	7; 2
3	(Belgium) (Poland)	Roel Bollen / Ruud Kuijten; Damian Plawecki / Przemysław Wacha	5; 7	1; 7	7; 5	4; 7
4	(Belgium) (Poland)	David Jaco; Kamil Turonek	0; 7	4; 7	8; 6	7; 0	3; 7
5	(Belgium) (Poland)	Wouter Claes / Frédéric Mawet; Michał Łogosz / Robert Mateusiak	1; 7	2; 7	2; 7

Ireland
0
Indoor-Sportcentrum Eindhoven
19 February 2002, 11:00 UTC+1

Poland
5

			1	2	3	4	5
1	(Republic of Ireland) (Poland)	Bruce Topping; Przemysław Wacha	0; 7	1; 7	2; 7
2	(Republic of Ireland) (Poland)	Ciaran Darcy; Jacek Niedźwiedzki	7; 3	7; 3	2; 7	2; 7	1; 7
3	(Republic of Ireland) (Poland)	Donal O'Halloran / Bruce Topping; Michał Łogosz / Robert Mateusiak	0; 7	3; 7	4; 7
4	(Republic of Ireland) (Poland)	Michael Watt; Kamil Turonek	5; 7	1; 7	5; 7
5	(Republic of Ireland) (Poland)	Graham Henderson / Eugene McKenna; Damian Pławecki / Przemysław Wacha	0; 7	1; 7	5; 7

Belgium
4
Indoor-Sportcentrum Eindhoven
19 February 2002, 11:00 UTC+1

Hungary
1

			1	2	3	4	5
1	(Belgium) (Hungary)	Ruud Kuijten; Levente Csiszér	7; 5	7; 4	7; 4
2	(Belgium) (Hungary)	Wouter Claes; Kristóf Horváth	7; 0	7; 3	7; 2
3	(Belgium) (Hungary)	Roel Bollen / Ruud Kuijten; András Sinka / Csaba Szikra	7; 3	7; 0	7; 4
4	(Belgium) (Hungary)	David Jaco; Attila Kaposi	7; 3	5; 7	5; 7	7; 3	6; 8
5	(Belgium) (Hungary)	Wouter Claes / Frédéric Mawet; Levente Csiszér / Kristóf Horváth	7; 5	7; 0	7; 2

==== Group D ====
Pos	Team	Pld	W	L	MF	MA	MD	GF	GA	GD	PF	PA	PD	Pts	Qualification
1	Russia	3	3	0	15	0	+15	45	7	+38	348	179	+169	3	Advance to second round
2	Portugal	3	2	1	6	9	−3	26	30	−4	284	297	−13	2	
3	Czech Republic	3	1	2	5	10	−5	21	36	−15	261	315	−54	1	
4	Switzerland	3	0	3	4	11	−7	16	35	−19	205	307	−102	0	

Source: toernooi.nl

Czech Republic
3
Indoor-Sportcentrum Eindhoven
17 February 2002, 14:30 UTC+1

Switzerland
2

			1	2	3	4	5
1	(Czech Republic) (Switzerland)	Jan Vondra; Christian Unternährer	7; 3	4; 7	7; 5	3; 7	7; 5
2	(Czech Republic) (Switzerland)	Jan Fröhlich; Paulo von Scala	7; 2	7; 1	7; 0
3	(Czech Republic) (Switzerland)	Martin Herout; Irfan Razi	7; 5	1; 7	4; 7	5; 7
4	(Czech Republic) (Switzerland)	Jan Fröhlich / Michal Turoň; Pascal Bircher / Elias Wieland	5; 7	1; 7	3; 7
5	(Czech Republic) (Switzerland)	Daniel Gaspar / Jan Vondra; Stefan Arnet / Paulo von Scala	7; 5	6; 8	7; 1	7; 1

Russia
5
Indoor-Sportcentrum Eindhoven
17 February 2002, 14:30 UTC+1

Portugal
0

			1	2	3	4	5
1	(Russia) (Portugal)	Stanislav Pukhov; Marco Vasconcelos	7; 4	7; 0	8; 6
2	(Russia) (Portugal)	Nikolaj Nikolaenko; Ricardo Fernandes	7; 4	4; 7	6; 8	7; 5	8; 6
3	(Russia) (Portugal)	Alexandr Shchepalkin; Fernando Silva	2; 7	7; 2	7; 5	4; 7	7; 4
4	(Russia) (Portugal)	Stanislav Pukhov / Nikolai Zuyev; Hugo Rodrigues / Marco Vasconcelos	7; 5	7; 0	7; 1
5	(Russia) (Portugal)	Aleksandr Nikolaenko / Nikolaj Nikolaenko; Ricardo Fernandes / Fernando Silva	7; 1	7; 1	8; 7

Russia
5
Indoor-Sportcentrum Eindhoven
18 February 2002, 18:00 UTC+1

Switzerland
0

			1	2	3	4	5
1	(Russia) (Switzerland)	Stanislav Pukhov; Christian Unternährer	7; 1	7; 0	7; 3
2	(Russia) (Switzerland)	Nikolaj Nikolaenko; Paulo von Scala	7; 1	7; 0	7; 5
3	(Russia) (Switzerland)	Stanislav Pukhov / Nikolai Zuyev; Pascal Bircher / Elias Wieland	7; 0	7; 3	7; 4
4	(Russia) (Switzerland)	Alexandr Shchepalkin; Irfan Razi	7; 4	7; 3	7; 0
5	(Russia) (Switzerland)	Aleksandr Nikolaenko / Nikolaj Nikolaenko; Stefan Arnet / Paulo von Scala	7; 1	7; 2	7; 3

Czech Republic
2
Indoor-Sportcentrum Eindhoven
18 February 2002, 18:00 UTC+1

Portugal
3

			1	2	3	4	5
1	(Czech Republic) (Portugal)	Jan Vondra; Marco Vasconcelos	7; 1	6; 7	6; 7	7; 2	7; 2
2	(Czech Republic) (Portugal)	Jan Fröhlich; Ricardo Fernandes	4; 7	7; 2	7; 5	7; 2
3	(Czech Republic) (Portugal)	Martin Herout; Fernando Silva	6; 8	0; 7	2; 7
4	(Czech Republic) (Portugal)	Martin Herout / Michal Turoň; Hugo Rodrigues / Marco Vasconcelos	1; 7	1; 7	2; 7
5	(Czech Republic) (Portugal)	Daniel Gaspar / Jan Vondra; Ricardo Fernandes / Fernando Silva	7; 1	0; 7	2; 7	7; 4	4; 7

Switzerland
2
Indoor-Sportcentrum Eindhoven
19 February 2002, 14:30 UTC+1

Portugal
3

			1	2	3	4	5
1	(Switzerland) (Portugal)	Christian Unternährer; Marco Vasconcelos	8; 6	4; 7	1; 7	6; 8
2	(Switzerland) (Portugal)	Paulo von Scala; Gil Martins	2; 7	7; 5	8; 7	7; 0
3	(Switzerland) (Portugal)	Irfan Razi; Fernando Silva	6; 8	3; 7	2; 7
4	(Switzerland) (Portugal)	Pascal Bircher / Elias Wieland; Hugo Rodrigues / Marco Vasconcelos	7; 3	7; 5	7; 2
5	(Switzerland) (Portugal)	Stefan Arnet / Paulo von Scala; Ricardo Fernandes / Fernando Silva	3; 7	3; 7	2; 7

Czech Republic
0
Indoor-Sportcentrum Eindhoven
19 February 2002, 14:30 UTC+1

Russia
5

			1	2	3	4	5
1	(Czech Republic) (Russia)	Jan Vondra; Stanislav Pukhov	3; 7	8; 7	2; 7	3; 7
2	(Czech Republic) (Russia)	Jan Fröhlich; Nikolaj Nikolaenko	5; 7	2; 7	7; 4	7; 1	5; 7
3	(Czech Republic) (Russia)	Michal Turoň; Alexandr Shchepalkin	7; 8	1; 7	1; 7
4	(Czech Republic) (Russia)	Jan Fröhlich / Daniel Gaspar; Aleksandr Nikolaenko / Nikolaj Nikolaenko	4; 7	7; 8	0; 7
5	(Czech Republic) (Russia)	Martin Herout / Michal Turoň; Stanislav Pukhov / Nikolai Zuyev	2; 7	2; 7	3; 7

==== Group E ====
Pos	Team	Pld	W	L	MF	MA	MD	GF	GA	GD	PF	PA	PD	Pts	Qualification
1	Spain	3	3	0	14	1	+13	44	14	+30	354	213	+141	3	Advance to second round
2	Austria	3	2	1	9	6	+3	35	20	+15	321	236	+85	2	
3	Bulgaria	3	1	2	7	8	−1	27	29	−2	281	268	+13	1	
4	Latvia	3	0	3	0	15	−15	2	45	−43	84	323	−239	0	

Source: toernooi.nl

Spain
4
Indoor-Sportcentrum Eindhoven
17 February 2002, 14:30 UTC+1

Austria
1

			1	2	3	4	5
1	(Spain) (Austria)	Sergio Llopis; Jürgen Koch	7; 5	3; 7	4; 7	7; 4	6; 8
2	(Spain) (Austria)	Arturo Ruiz; Heimo Götschl	7; 5	3; 7	7; 5	7; 3
3	(Spain) (Austria)	José Antonio Crespo; Peter Kreulitsch	3; 7	7; 2	7; 2	7; 4
4	(Spain) (Austria)	Sergio Llopis / Arturo Ruiz; Harald Koch / Jürgen Koch	7; 1	2; 7	7; 2	2; 7	7; 3
5	(Spain) (Austria)	José Antonio Crespo / Carlos Longo; Heimo Götschl / Peter Kreulitsch	1; 7	8; 6	7; 5	7; 1

Bulgaria
5
Indoor-Sportcentrum Eindhoven
17 February 2002, 14:30 UTC+1

Latvia
0

			1	2	3	4	5
1	(Bulgaria) (Latvia)	Konstantin Dobrev; Edijs Līviņš	7; 3	7; 0	7; 4
2	(Bulgaria) (Latvia)	Georgi Petrov; Ivo Keišs	7; 0	7; 1	7; 0
3	(Bulgaria) (Latvia)	Alexey Shishov; Raimonds Cipe	3; 7	5; 7	7; 4	7; 1	7; 0
4	(Bulgaria) (Latvia)	Konstantin Dobrev / Georgi Petrov; Imants Kelmers / Edijs Līviņš	7; 0	7; 2	7; 0
5	(Bulgaria) (Latvia)	Julian Hristov / Stefan Lutzkanov; Reinis Belasovs / Ivo Keišs	7; 1	7; 1	7; 0

Bulgaria
2
Indoor-Sportcentrum Eindhoven
18 February 2002, 14:30 UTC+1

Austria
3

			1	2	3	4	5
1	(Bulgaria) (Austria)	Konstantin Dobrev; Jürgen Koch	3; 7	5; 7	0; 7
2	(Bulgaria) (Austria)	Georgi Petrov; Martin de Jonge	7; 4	8; 6	6; 8	7; 2
3	(Bulgaria) (Austria)	Julian Hristov; Heimo Götschl	4; 7	5; 7	3; 7
4	(Bulgaria) (Austria)	Konstantin Dobrev / Alexey Shishov; Jürgen Koch / Peter Zauner	4; 7	7; 3	7; 5	0; 7	8; 6
5	(Bulgaria) (Austria)	Georgi Petrov / Julian Hristov; Harald Koch / Peter Kreulitsch	5; 7	2; 7	3; 7

Spain
5
Indoor-Sportcentrum Eindhoven
18 February 2002, 11:00 UTC+1

Latvia
0

			1	2	3	4	5
1	(Spain) (Latvia)	Sergio Llopis; Edijs Līviņš	7; 1	7; 5	7; 0
2	(Spain) (Latvia)	Carlos Longo; Imants Kelmers	7; 3	7; 3	7; 0
3	(Spain) (Latvia)	Nicolás Escartín; Reinis Belasovs	7; 2	7; 2	7; 1
4	(Spain) (Latvia)	Nicolás Escartín / Arturo Ruiz; Imants Kelmers / Edijs Līviņš	7; 0	7; 0	7; 4
5	(Spain) (Latvia)	José Antonio Crespo / Sergio Llopis; Reinis Belasovs / Ivo Keišs	7; 1	7; 0	7; 2

Spain
5
Indoor-Sportcentrum Eindhoven
19 February 2002, 14:30 UTC+1

Bulgaria
0

			1	2	3	4	5
1	(Spain) (Bulgaria)	Sergio Llopis; Konstantin Dobrev	7; 3	3; 7	8; 6	4; 7	8; 6
2	(Spain) (Bulgaria)	Arturo Ruiz; Georgi Petrov	7; 2	7; 3	0; 7	7; 0
3	(Spain) (Bulgaria)	José Antonio Crespo; Julian Hristov	7; 0	4; 7	7; 0	7; 2
4	(Spain) (Bulgaria)	Nicolás Escartín / Arturo Ruiz; Konstantin Dobrev / Georgi Petrov	7; 1	5; 7	3; 7	7; 3	7; 5
5	(Spain) (Bulgaria)	José Antonio Crespo / Carlos Longo; Stefan Lutzkanov / Alexey Shishov	7; 4	7; 3	7; 4

Austria
5
Indoor-Sportcentrum Eindhoven
19 February 2002, 14:30 UTC+1

Latvia
0

			1	2	3	4	5
1	(Austria) (Latvia)	Jürgen Koch; Ivo Keišs	7; 0	7; 0	7; 1
2	(Austria) (Latvia)	Martin de Jonge; Raimonds Cipe	7; 5	7; 4	7; 2
3	(Austria) (Latvia)	Heimo Götschl; Reinis Belasovs	7; 1	7; 2	7; 5
4	(Austria) (Latvia)	Harald Koch / Peter Kreulitsch; Imants Kelmers / Edijs Līviņš	7; 2	7; 2	7; 1
5	(Austria) (Latvia)	Jürgen Koch / Peter Zauner; Reinis Belasovs / Ivo Keišs	7; 1	7; 1	7; 2

==== Group F ====
Pos	Team	Pld	W	L	MF	MA	MD	GF	GA	GD	PF	PA	PD	Pts	Qualification
1	Ukraine	3	3	0	13	2	+11	41	11	+30	329	187	+142	3	Advance to second round
2	Finland	3	2	1	11	4	+7	36	14	+22	300	176	+124	2	
3	Norway	3	1	2	6	9	−3	19	31	−12	231	286	−55	1	
4	Sri Lanka	3	0	3	0	15	−15	5	45	−40	132	343	−211	0	

Source: toernooi.nl

Norway
1
Indoor-Sportcentrum Eindhoven
17 February 2002, 11:00 UTC+1

Ukraine
4

			1	2	3	4	5
1	(Norway) (Ukraine)	Jim Ronny Andersen; Vladislav Druzhchenko	4; 7	0; 7	6; 8
2	(Norway) (Ukraine)	Truls Barth Nilsen; Dmitry Miznikov	3; 7	0; 7	7; 8
3	(Norway) (Ukraine)	Steinar Klausen; Sergey Yakovlev	7; 5	3; 7	7; 8	3; 7
4	(Norway) (Ukraine)	Truls Barth Nilsen / Egil Pay; Vladislav Druzhchenko / Valeriy Streltsov	1; 7	0; 7	0; 7
5	(Norway) (Ukraine)	Jim Ronny Andersen / Trond Wåland; Dmitry Miznikov / Sergey Yakovlev	5; 7	7; 2	7; 4	7; 1

Finland
5
Indoor-Sportcentrum Eindhoven
17 February 2002, 11:00 UTC+1

Sri Lanka
0

			1	2	3	4	5
1	(Finland) (Sri Lanka)	Ville Kinnunen; Niluka Karunaratne	7; 0	7; 0	7; 1
2	(Finland) (Sri Lanka)	Kasperi Salo; Manjula Sampath Fernando	7; 0	7; 0	7; 1
3	(Finland) (Sri Lanka)	Ilkka Nyqvist; Duminda Jayakody	7; 3	7; 0	7; 3
4	(Finland) (Sri Lanka)	Petri Hyyrylainen / Ville Kinnunen; Dinesh Ranasinghe / Udaya Wanasinghe	7; 0	7; 0	7; 1
5	(Finland) (Sri Lanka)	Alexander Book / Antti Viitikko; Duminda Jayakody / Niluka Karunaratne	5; 7	7; 0	7; 5	7; 1

Finland
5
Indoor-Sportcentrum Eindhoven
18 February 2002, 14:30 UTC+1

Norway
0

			1	2	3	4	5
1	(Finland) (Norway)	Ville Kinnunen; Jim Ronny Andersen	7; 5	7; 5	7; 5
2	(Finland) (Norway)	Ilkka Nyqvist; Truls Barth Nilsen	7; 1	7; 0	7; 3
3	(Finland) (Norway)	Antti Viitikko; Steinar Klausen	7; 1	7; 5	7; 2
4	(Finland) (Norway)	Petri Hyyrylainen / Ilkka Nyqvist; Lars Gunnar Abusdal / Jim Ronny Andersen	7; 0	7; 1	7; 2
5	(Finland) (Norway)	Alexander Book / Antti Viitikko; Truls Barth Nilsen / Egil Pay	7; 6	7; 1	7; 5

Ukraine
5
Indoor-Sportcentrum Eindhoven
18 February 2002, 14:30 UTC+1

Sri Lanka
0

			1	2	3	4	5
1	(Ukraine) (Sri Lanka)	Vladislav Druzhchenko; Niluka Karunaratne	7; 2	7; 1	7; 1
2	(Ukraine) (Sri Lanka)	Dmitry Miznikov; Manjula Sampath Fernando	7; 5	6; 8	7; 1	7; 1
3	(Ukraine) (Sri Lanka)	Vladislav Tolstopyatov; Duminda Jayakody	7; 2	7; 3	7; 3
4	(Ukraine) (Sri Lanka)	Vladislav Druzhchenko / Valeriy Streltsov; Duminda Jayakody / Niluka Karunaratne	7; 1	7; 2	7; 1
5	(Ukraine) (Sri Lanka)	Vladislav Tolstopyatov / Sergey Yakovlev; Dinesh Ranasinghe / Udaya Wanasinghe	7; 3	7; 0	7; 1

Finland
1
Indoor-Sportcentrum Eindhoven
19 February 2002, 18:00 UTC+1

Ukraine
4

			1	2	3	4	5
1	(Finland) (Ukraine)	Ville Kinnunen; Vladislav Druzhchenko	2; 7	3; 7	6; 8
2	(Finland) (Ukraine)	Ilkka Nyqvist; Dmitry Miznikov	1; 7	2; 7	7; 4	5; 7
3	(Finland) (Ukraine)	Antti Viitikko; Sergey Yakovlev	7; 1	7; 2	6; 8	7; 5
4	(Finland) (Ukraine)	Ville Kinnunen / Antti Viitikko; Vladislav Druzhchenko / Valeriy Streltsov	7; 4	7; 3	2; 7	3; 7	1; 7
5	(Finland) (Ukraine)	Petri Hyyrylainen / Kasperi Salo; Dmitry Miznikov / Sergey Yakovlev	5; 7	3; 7	4; 7

Norway
5
Indoor-Sportcentrum Eindhoven
19 February 2002, 18:00 UTC+1

Sri Lanka
0

			1	2	3	4	5
1	(Norway) (Sri Lanka)	Jim Ronny Andersen; Niluka Karunaratne	8; 7	7; 1	8; 6
2	(Norway) (Sri Lanka)	Truls Barth Nilsen; Manjula Sampath Fernando	7; 4	4; 7	7; 8	8; 6	7; 1
3	(Norway) (Sri Lanka)	Steinar Klausen; Duminda Jayakody	7; 4	7; 3	8; 7
4	(Norway) (Sri Lanka)	Jim Ronny Andersen / Truls Barth Nilsen; Dinesh Ranasinghe / Udaya Wanasinghe	7; 5	7; 0	7; 3
5	(Norway) (Sri Lanka)	Lars Gunnar Abusdal / Egil Pay; Manjula Sampath Fernando / Duminda Jayakody	2; 7	7; 2	7; 2	7; 2

=== Second round ===
==== Group W ====
Pos	Team	Pld	W	L	MF	MA	MD	GF	GA	GD	PF	PA	PD	Pts	Qualification
1	Denmark	3	3	0	14	1	+13	44	6	+38	336	134	+202	3	Advance to Knockout stage
2	New Zealand	3	2	1	8	7	+1	28	25	+3	261	256	+5	2	
3	Wales	3	1	2	4	11	−7	16	35	−19	193	300	−107	1	
4	Spain	3	0	3	4	11	−7	15	37	−22	206	306	−100	0	

Source: toernooi.nl

Denmark
4
Indoor-Sportcentrum Eindhoven
20 February 2002, 14:30 UTC+1

Spain
1

			1	2	3	4	5
1	(Denmark) (Spain)	Kenneth Jonassen; Arturo Ruiz	7; 4	7; 2	7; 0
2	(Denmark) (Spain)	Anders Boesen; Carlos Longo	7; 1	7; 2	7; 1
3	(Denmark) (Spain)	Kasper Ødum; José Antonio Crespo	5; 7	7; 3	3; 7	7; 1	6; 8
4	(Denmark) (Spain)	Lars Paaske / Jonas Rasmussen; Nicolás Escartín / Carlos Longo	7; 0	7; 0	7; 5
5	(Denmark) (Spain)	Jesper Larsen / Jim Laugesen; José Antonio Crespo / Sergio Llopis	7; 1	7; 0	4; 7	7; 3

New Zealand
4
Indoor-Sportcentrum Eindhoven
20 February 2002, 14:30 UTC+1

Wales
1

			1	2	3	4	5
1	(New Zealand) (Wales)	Geoffrey Bellingham; Richard Vaughan	7; 4	7; 4	3; 7	4; 7	0; 7
2	(New Zealand) (Wales)	Nick Hall; Martyn Lewis	7; 5	7; 5	8; 6
3	(New Zealand) (Wales)	John Gordon; Liam Ingram	7; 1	7; 1	7; 1
4	(New Zealand) (Wales)	Geoffrey Bellingham / Chris Blair; Matthew Hughes / Martyn Lewis	1; 7	7; 2	4; 7	7; 3	7; 2
5	(New Zealand) (Wales)	John Gordon / Daniel Shirley; Liam Ingram / Philip Linnard	7; 1	7; 1	7; 0

New Zealand
4
Indoor-Sportcentrum Eindhoven
21 February 2002, 14:30 UTC+1

Spain
1

			1	2	3	4	5
1	(New Zealand) (Spain)	Geoffrey Bellingham; Sergio Llopis	8; 6	7; 2	2; 7	7; 2
2	(New Zealand) (Spain)	Nick Hall; Arturo Ruiz	7; 5	7; 1	7; 4
3	(New Zealand) (Spain)	John Gordon; José Antonio Crespo	7; 4	7; 3	7; 8	7; 2
4	(New Zealand) (Spain)	Geoffrey Bellingham / Chris Blair; Nicolás Escartín / Arturo Ruiz	7; 3	7; 5	7; 4
5	(New Zealand) (Spain)	John Gordon / Daniel Shirley; José Antonio Crespo / Sergio Llopis	7; 1	5; 7	7; 1	0; 7	5; 7

Denmark
5
Indoor-Sportcentrum Eindhoven
21 February 2002, 14:30 UTC+1

Wales
0

			1	2	3	4	5
1	(Denmark) (Wales)	Anders Boesen; Richard Vaughan	7; 8	7; 5	7; 5	1; 7	7; 2
2	(Denmark) (Wales)	Kasper Ødum; Martyn Lewis	7; 0	7; 1	7; 0
3	(Denmark) (Wales)	Peter Rasmussen; Liam Ingram	7; 0	7; 0	7; 3
4	(Denmark) (Wales)	Jens Eriksen / Martin Lundgaard Hansen; Matthew Hughes / Martyn Lewis	7; 3	7; 5	7; 3
5	(Denmark) (Wales)	Lars Paaske / Jonas Rasmussen; Liam Ingram / Philip Linnard	7; 2	8; 6	7; 0

Spain
2
Indoor-Sportcentrum Eindhoven
22 February 2002, 14:30 UTC+1

Wales
3

			1	2	3	4	5
1	(Spain) (Wales)	Sergio Llopis; Richard Vaughan	6; 8	6; 8	3; 7
2	(Spain) (Wales)	Arturo Ruiz; Martyn Lewis	4; 7	3; 7	3; 7
3	(Spain) (Wales)	José Antonio Crespo; Liam Ingram	7; 0	7; 2	7; 2
4	(Spain) (Wales)	Nicolás Escartín / Arturo Ruiz; Matthew Hughes / Martyn Lewis	1; 7	3; 7	4; 7
5	(Spain) (Wales)	José Antonio Crespo / Sergio Llopis; Liam Ingram / Philip Linnard	7; 0	7; 2	7; 1

Denmark
5
Indoor-Sportcentrum Eindhoven
22 February 2002, 14:30 UTC+1

New Zealand
0

			1	2	3	4	5
1	(Denmark) (New Zealand)	Kenneth Jonassen; Geoffrey Bellingham	7; 4	7; 0	7; 1
2	(Denmark) (New Zealand)	Anders Boesen; Nick Hall	7; 0	7; 3	7; 1
3	(Denmark) (New Zealand)	Kasper Ødum; Chris Blair	8; 6	7; 3	7; 3
4	(Denmark) (New Zealand)	Jens Eriksen / Martin Lundgaard Hansen; Geoffrey Bellingham / Nick Hall	7; 0	7; 0	7; 2
5	(Denmark) (New Zealand)	Jesper Larsen / Jim Laugesen; Chris Blair / Daniel Shirley	7; 3	7; 2	7; 4

==== Group X ====
Pos	Team	Pld	W	L	MF	MA	MD	GF	GA	GD	PF	PA	PD	Pts	Qualification
1	Sweden	3	3	0	12	3	+9	40	12	+28	322	206	+116	3	Advance to Knockout stage
2	Ukraine	3	2	1	8	7	+1	29	28	+1	285	293	−8	2	
3	France	3	1	2	6	9	−3	24	35	−11	284	332	−48	1	
4	United States	3	0	3	4	11	−7	21	39	−18	273	333	−60	0	

Source: toernooi.nl

Sweden
4
Indoor-Sportcentrum Eindhoven
20 February 2002, 11:00 UTC+1

France
1

			1	2	3	4	5
1	(Sweden) (France)	Rasmus Wengberg; Nabil Lasmari	7; 2	7; 4	7; 2
2	(Sweden) (France)	Joakim Andersson / Johan Holm; Manuel Dubrulle / Vincent Laigle	0; 7	8; 7	7; 1	6; 8	4; 7
3	(Sweden) (France)	Per-Henrik Croona; Sydney Lengagne	7; 5	8; 6	4; 7	7; 4
4	(Sweden) (France)	Fredrik Bergström / George Rimarcdi; Erwin Kehlhoffner / Thomas Quéré	7; 1	7; 2	7; 1
5	(Sweden) (France)	Daniel Eriksson; Jean-Michel Lefort	7; 1	7; 3	7; 3

United States
1
Indoor-Sportcentrum Eindhoven
20 February 2002, 11:00 UTC+1

Ukraine
4

			1	2	3	4	5
1	(United States) (Ukraine)	Kevin Han; Vladislav Druzchenko	1; 7	4; 7	3; 7
2	(United States) (Ukraine)	Khan Malaythong; Dmitry Miznikov	7; 2	5; 7	0; 7	0; 7
3	(United States) (Ukraine)	Howard Bach; Vladislav Tolstopyatov	7; 0	2; 7	4; 7	7; 2	7; 3
4	(United States) (Ukraine)	Khan Malaythong / Amarit Rojsirivit; Dmitry Miznikov / Sergey Yakovlev	2; 7	2; 7	7; 4	5; 7
5	(United States) (Ukraine)	Howard Bach / Kevin Han; Vladislav Druzchenko / Valeriy Streltsov	4; 7	7; 2	5; 7	7; 1	6; 8

United States
2
Indoor-Sportcentrum Eindhoven
21 February 2002, 11:00 UTC+1

France
3

			1	2	3	4	5
1	(United States) (France)	Kevin Han; Nabil Lasmari	2; 7	0; 7	7; 1	7; 3	2; 7
2	(United States) (France)	Khan Malaythong; Sydney Lengagne	7; 2	5; 7	7; 3	7; 4
3	(United States) (France)	Howard Bach / Kevin Han; Manuel Dubrulle / Vincent Laigle	4; 7	7; 3	8; 6	7; 3
4	(United States) (France)	Eric Go; Jean-Michel Lefort	6; 8	7; 5	6; 8	2; 7
5	(United States) (France)	Khan Malaythong / Amarit Rojsirivit; Erwin Kehlhoffner / Thomas Quéré	5; 7	5; 7	7; 3	7; 3	4; 7

Sweden
4
Indoor-Sportcentrum Eindhoven
21 February 2002, 11:00 UTC+1

Ukraine
1

			1	2	3	4	5
1	(Sweden) (Ukraine)	George Rimarcdi; Vladislav Druzchenko	3; 7	7; 8	0; 7
2	(Sweden) (Ukraine)	Per-Henrik Croona; Dmitry Miznikov	2; 7	7; 3	5; 7	7; 4	8; 6
3	(Sweden) (Ukraine)	Daniel Eriksson; Vladislav Tolstopyatov	7; 5	7; 1	7; 1
4	(Sweden) (Ukraine)	Fredrik Bergström / Rasmus Wengberg; Dmitry Miznikov / Sergey Yakovlev	7; 2	7; 0	7; 1
5	(Sweden) (Ukraine)	Joakim Andersson / Johan Holm; Valeriy Streltsov / Vladislav Tolstopyatov	7; 5	8; 7	7; 2

France
2
Indoor-Sportcentrum Eindhoven
22 February 2002, 11:00 UTC+1

Ukraine
3

			1	2	3	4	5
1	(France) (Ukraine)	Nabil Lasmari; Vladislav Druzchenko	2; 7	4; 7	1; 7
2	(France) (Ukraine)	Jean-Michel Lefort; Dmitry Miznikov	7; 1	3; 7	7; 3	7; 4
3	(France) (Ukraine)	Olivier Fossy; Sergey Yakovlev	7; 1	5; 7	5; 7	7; 2	4; 7
4	(France) (Ukraine)	Manuel Dubrulle / Vincent Laigle; Vladislav Druzchenko / Valeriy Streltsov	3; 7	7; 5	4; 7	4; 7
5	(France) (Ukraine)	Erwin Kehlhoffner / Thomas Quéré; Dmitry Miznikov / Sergey Yakovlev	7; 2	7; 5	7; 6

Sweden
4
Indoor-Sportcentrum Eindhoven
22 February 2002, 11:00 UTC+1

United States
1

			1	2	3	4	5
1	(Sweden) (United States)	Rasmus Wengberg; Khan Malaythong	7; 0	7; 2	7; 0
2	(Sweden) (United States)	George Rimarcdi; Eric Go	7; 5	7; 4	7; 1
3	(Sweden) (United States)	Daniel Eriksson; Amarit Rojsirivit	7; 1	7; 0	7; 1
4	(Sweden) (United States)	Henrik Andersson / Fredrik Bergström; Howard Bach / Kevin Han	0; 7	1; 7	8; 7	8; 6	3; 7
5	(Sweden) (United States)	Joakim Andersson / Johan Holm; Khan Malaythong / Amarit Rojsirivit	8; 7	7; 3	7; 4

==== Group Y ====
Pos	Team	Pld	W	L	MF	MA	MD	GF	GA	GD	PF	PA	PD	Pts	Qualification
1	Germany	3	3	0	12	3	+9	40	17	+23	346	217	+129	3	Advance to Knockout stage
2	Netherlands	3	2	1	9	6	+3	37	24	+13	331	279	+52	2	
3	Canada	3	1	2	6	9	−3	23	33	−10	261	312	−51	1	
4	Scotland	3	0	3	3	12	−9	15	41	−26	215	345	−130	0	

Source: toernooi.nl

Germany
4
Indoor-Sportcentrum Eindhoven
20 February 2002, 14:30 UTC+1

Netherlands
1

			1	2	3	4	5
1	(Germany) (Netherlands)	Björn Joppien; Dicky Palyama	4; 7	3; 7	7; 3	2; 7
2	(Germany) (Netherlands)	Oliver Pongratz; Gerben Bruijstens	0; 7	7; 0	4; 7	7; 0	7; 3
3	(Germany) (Netherlands)	Jens Roch; Chris Bruil	3; 7	7; 3	7; 2	7; 2
4	(Germany) (Netherlands)	Kristof Hopp / Thomas Tesche; Dennis Lens / Dicky Palyama	7; 3	4; 7	8; 6	7; 1
5	(Germany) (Netherlands)	Björn Siegemund / Joachim Tesche; Chris Bruil / Tijs Creemers	2; 7	7; 5	7; 4	5; 7	7; 2

Canada
4
Indoor-Sportcentrum Eindhoven
20 February 2002, 14:30 UTC+1

Scotland
1

			1	2	3	4	5
1	(Canada) (Scotland)	Andrew Dabeka; Graham Simpson	7; 3	8; 6	7; 0
2	(Canada) (Scotland)	Stephan Wojcikiewicz; Graeme Smith	4; 7	3; 7	7; 2	7; 0	7; 5
3	(Canada) (Scotland)	Bryan Moody / Brent Olynyk; Alastair Gatt / Craig Robertson	7; 2	7; 5	7; 1
4	(Canada) (Scotland)	Kyle Hunter; Alistair Casey	5; 7	7; 3	6; 8	1; 7
5	(Canada) (Scotland)	Keith Chan / William Milroy; Russell Hogg / Graeme Smith	8; 6	4; 7	7; 0	7; 4

Canada
1
Indoor-Sportcentrum Eindhoven
21 February 2002, 14:30 UTC+1

Netherlands
4

			1	2	3	4	5
1	(Canada) (Netherlands)	Andrew Dabeka; Gerben Bruijstens	2; 7	4; 7	5; 7
2	(Canada) (Netherlands)	Stephan Wojcikiewicz; Rune Massing	7; 5	2; 7	0; 7	2; 7
3	(Canada) (Netherlands)	Kyle Hunter; Dennis Lens	3; 7	1; 7	7; 4	5; 7
4	(Canada) (Netherlands)	Keith Chan / William Milroy; Tijs Creemers / Remco Muyris	6; 8	7; 3	3; 7	7; 0	8; 6
5	(Canada) (Netherlands)	Bryan Moody / Brent Olynyk; Chris Bruil / Dennis Lens	0; 7	6; 8	1; 7

Germany
4
Indoor-Sportcentrum Eindhoven
21 February 2002, 14:30 UTC+1

Scotland
1

			1	2	3	4	5
1	(Germany) (Scotland)	Björn Joppien; Graham Simpson	7; 3	7; 1	7; 1
2	(Germany) (Scotland)	Conrad Hückstädt; Graeme Smith	7; 0	7; 1	7; 2
3	(Germany) (Scotland)	Björn Siegemund / Joachim Tesche; Alastair Gatt / Craig Robertson	7; 3	8; 6	5; 7	4; 7	4; 7
4	(Germany) (Scotland)	Oliver Pongratz; Alistair Casey	7; 1	7; 1	7; 0
5	(Germany) (Scotland)	Jochen Cassel / Ingo Kindervater; Russell Hogg / Graeme Smith	7; 0	7; 4	8; 7

Netherlands
4
Indoor-Sportcentrum Eindhoven
22 February 2002, 14:30 UTC+1

Scotland
1

			1	2	3	4	5
1	(Netherlands) (Scotland)	Dicky Palyama; Graham Simpson	7; 2	8; 7	7; 3
2	(Netherlands) (Scotland)	Gerben Bruijstens; Graeme Smith	7; 2	7; 5	7; 6
3	(Netherlands) (Scotland)	Chris Bruil / Dennis Lens; Alastair Gatt / Craig Robertson	5; 7	7; 0	7; 3	1; 7	7; 1
4	(Netherlands) (Scotland)	Rune Massing; Alistair Casey	7; 2	1; 7	7; 2	7; 1
5	(Netherlands) (Scotland)	Tijs Creemers / Remco Muyris; Russell Hogg / Graeme Smith	3; 7	0; 7	7; 2	7; 5	7; 8

Germany
4
Indoor-Sportcentrum Eindhoven
22 February 2002, 14:30 UTC+1

Canada
1

			1	2	3	4	5
1	(Germany) (Canada)	Björn Joppien; Andrew Dabeka	7; 4	3; 7	7; 4	7; 4
2	(Germany) (Canada)	Kristof Hopp / Thomas Tesche; Keith Chan / William Milroy	7; 8	7; 0	7; 0	7; 1
3	(Germany) (Canada)	Oliver Pongratz; Stephan Wojcikiewicz	7; 1	7; 2	8; 6
4	(Germany) (Canada)	Björn Siegemund / Joachim Tesche; Bryan Moody / Brent Olynyk	7; 5	3; 7	7; 8	2; 7
5	(Germany) (Canada)	Jens Roch; Kyle Hunter	7; 0	7; 2	7; 3

==== Group Z ====
Pos	Team	Pld	W	L	MF	MA	MD	GF	GA	GD	PF	PA	PD	Pts	Qualification
1	India	3	3	0	10	5	+5	37	23	+14	344	282	+62	3	Advance to Knockout stage
2	England	3	2	1	11	4	+7	38	16	+22	334	219	+115	2	
3	Russia	3	1	2	5	10	−5	19	37	−18	257	312	−55	1	
4	Poland	3	0	3	4	11	−7	18	36	−18	212	334	−122	0	

Source: toernooi.nl

England
5
Indoor-Sportcentrum Eindhoven
20 February 2002, 18:00 UTC+1

Russia
0

			1	2	3	4	5
1	(England) (Russia)	Colin Haughton; Stanislav Pukhov	7; 5	7; 3	7; 1
2	(England) (Russia)	Mark Constable; Aleksandr Nikolaenko	7; 1	7; 3	7; 3
3	(England) (Russia)	Anthony Clark / Nathan Robertson; Stanislav Pukhov / Nikolai Zuyev	7; 4	7; 3	7; 8	4; 7	7; 4
4	(England) (Russia)	Michael Edge; Alexandr Shchepalkin	7; 4	7; 4	7; 2
5	(England) (Russia)	Julian Robertson / Ian Sullivan; Aleksandr Nikolaenko / Nikolaj Nikolaenko	7; 1	7; 5	7; 1

India
4
Indoor-Sportcentrum Eindhoven
20 February 2002, 18:00 UTC+1

Poland
1

			1	2	3	4	5
1	(India) (Poland)	Abhinn Shyam Gupta; Przemysław Wacha	6; 8	7; 0	0; 7	6; 8
2	(India) (Poland)	Chetan Anand; Jacek Niedźwiedzki	7; 5	8; 6	7; 3
3	(India) (Poland)	Valiyaveetil Diju / Sanave Thomas; Michał Łogosz / Robert Mateusiak	7; 3	5; 7	7; 5	4; 7	7; 5
4	(India) (Poland)	Nikhil Kanetkar; Kamil Turonek	7; 2	7; 1	7; 2
5	(India) (Poland)	Chetan Anand / Jaseel P. Ismail; Damian Pławecki / Przemysław Wacha	4; 7	8; 6	7; 0	7; 0

India
3
Indoor-Sportcentrum Eindhoven
21 February 2002, 18:00 UTC+1

Russia
2

			1	2	3	4	5
1	(India) (Russia)	Abhinn Shyam Gupta; Stanislav Pukhov	1; 7	5; 7	7; 3	7; 0	2; 7
2	(India) (Russia)	Chetan Anand; Aleksandr Nikolaenko	8; 7	7; 1	7; 2
3	(India) (Russia)	Valiyaveetil Diju / Sanave Thomas; Stanislav Pukhov / Nikolai Zuyev	7; 2	3; 7	8; 7	7; 5
4	(India) (Russia)	Nikhil Kanetkar; Alexandr Shchepalkin	7; 1	7; 3	7; 1
5	(India) (Russia)	Arvind Bhat / Jaseel P. Ismail; Aleksandr Nikolaenko / Nikolaj Nikolaenko	7; 1	7; 5	2; 7	5; 7	2; 7

England
4
Indoor-Sportcentrum Eindhoven
21 February 2002, 18:00 UTC+1

Poland
1

			1	2	3	4	5
1	(England) (Poland)	Colin Haughton; Jacek Niedźwiedzki	7; 4	7; 2	7; 2
2	(England) (Poland)	Mark Constable; Damian Pławecki	7; 1	7; 2	7; 0
3	(England) (Poland)	Anthony Clark / Nathan Robertson; Michał Łogosz / Robert Mateusiak	5; 7	2; 7	7; 4	7; 8
4	(England) (Poland)	Andrew South; Kamil Turonek	7; 5	7; 1	7; 0
5	(England) (Poland)	James Anderson / Graham Hurrell; Jacek Niedźwiedzki / Damian Pławecki	7; 0	7; 1	7; 3

Russia
3
Indoor-Sportcentrum Eindhoven
22 February 2002, 18:00 UTC+1

Poland
2

			1	2	3	4	5
1	(Russia) (Poland)	Stanislav Pukhov; Przemysław Wacha	4; 7	7; 2	8; 6	4; 7	7; 1
2	(Russia) (Poland)	Nikolaj Nikolaenko; Jacek Niedźwiedzki	3; 7	3; 7	6; 7
3	(Russia) (Poland)	Stanislav Pukhov / Nikolai Zuyev; Michał Łogosz / Robert Mateusiak	4; 7	7; 1	7; 2	7; 2
4	(Russia) (Poland)	Alexandr Shchepalkin; Kamil Turonek	7; 2	4; 7	7; 8	5; 7
5	(Russia) (Poland)	Aleksandr Nikolaenko / Nikolaj Nikolaenko; Damian Pławecki / Jacek Niedźwiedzki	7; 0	7; 1	7; 2

England
2
Indoor-Sportcentrum Eindhoven
22 February 2002, 18:00 UTC+1

India
3

			1	2	3	4	5
1	(England) (India)	Mark Constable; Abhinn Shyam Gupta	5; 7	8; 6	7; 8	7; 0	4; 7
2	(England) (India)	Anthony Clark / Nathan Robertson; Valiyaveetil Diju / Sanave Thomas	8; 6	7; 1	7; 5
3	(England) (India)	Andrew South; Chetan Anand	7; 1	7; 4	3; 7	3; 7	4; 7
4	(England) (India)	Julian Robertson / Ian Sullivan; Arvind Bhat / Jaseel P. Ismail	4; 7	7; 5	7; 5	5; 7	7; 2
5	(England) (India)	Michael Edge; Nikhil Kanetkar	2; 7	3; 7	1; 7

=== Knockout stage ===
Semi-finals
Denmark	3
Sweden	0
Germany	3
India	0

Final
Denmark	3
Germany	0
Third place
Sweden	3
India	1

==== Semi-finals ====
Denmark
3
Indoor-Sportcentrum Eindhoven
23 February 2002, 12:00 UTC+1

Sweden
0

			1	2	3	4	5
1	(Denmark) (Sweden)	Kenneth Jonassen; Rasmus Wengberg	7; 3	7; 2	4; 7	7; 1
2	(Denmark) (Sweden)	Jesper Larsen / Jim Laugesen; Henrik Andersson / Fredrik Bergström	7; 4	7; 4	7; 4
3	(Denmark) (Sweden)	Anders Boesen; George Rimarcdi	7; 4	7; 3	7; 3
4	(Denmark) (Sweden)	Jens Eriksen / Martin Lundgaard Hansen; Joakim Andersson / Johan Holm						not played
5	(Denmark) (Sweden)	Peter Rasmussen; Daniel Eriksson						not played

Germany
3
Indoor-Sportcentrum Eindhoven
23 February 2002, 16:00 UTC+1

India
0

			1	2	3	4	5
1	(Germany) (India)	Björn Joppien; Abhinn Shyam Gupta	7; 2	7; 0	7; 2
2	(Germany) (India)	Kristof Hopp / Thomas Tesche; Valiyaveetil Diju / Sanave Thomas	7; 3	7; 2	4; 7	7; 1
3	(Germany) (India)	Oliver Pongratz; Chetan Anand	7; 1	7; 0	7; 2
4	(Germany) (India)	Jochen Cassel / Ingo Kindervater; Arvind Bhat / Jaseel P. Ismail						not played
5	(Germany) (India)	Jens Roch; Nikhil Kanetkar						not played

==== Third place ====
Sweden
3
Indoor-Sportcentrum Eindhoven
24 February 2002, 10:00 UTC+1

India
1

			1	2	3	4	5
1	(Sweden) (India)	Rasmus Wengberg; Abhinn Shyam Gupta	7; 4	1; 7	7; 1	7; 1
2	(Sweden) (India)	Henrik Andersson / George Rimarcdi; Valiyaveetil Diju / Sanave Thomas	0; 7	0; 7	8; 7	8; 7	7; 1
3	(Sweden) (India)	Per-Henrik Croona; Chetan Anand	7; 8	3; 7	2; 7
4	(Sweden) (India)	Fredrik Bergström / Rasmus Wengberg; Arvind Bhat / Jaseel P. Ismail	7; 1	7; 4	3; 7	7; 5
5	(Sweden) (India)	Daniel Eriksson; Nikhil Kanetkar						not played

==== Final ====
Denmark
3
Indoor-Sportcentrum Eindhoven
24 February 2002, 10:00 UTC+1

Germany
0

			1	2	3	4	5
1	(Denmark) (Germany)	Anders Boesen; Björn Joppien	7; 1	5; 7	7; 2	7; 0
2	(Denmark) (Germany)	Jens Eriksen / Martin Lundgaard Hansen; Kristof Hopp / Thomas Tesche	7; 1	1; 7	7; 4	7; 2
3	(Denmark) (Germany)	Kasper Ødum; Oliver Pongratz	7; 1	7; 3	7; 2
4	(Denmark) (Germany)	Lars Paaske / Jonas Rasmussen; Jochen Cassel / Ingo Kindervater						not played
5	(Denmark) (Germany)	Peter Rasmussen; Jens Roch						not played
