= Slovenian National Badminton Championships =

The Slovenian National Badminton Championships is a tournament organized to crown the best badminton players in Slovenia. The tournament started in 1958 and is held every year.

== Past winners ==
| Year | Men's singles | Women's singles | Men's doubles | Women's doubles | Mixed doubles |
|---|---|---|---|---|---|
| 1958 | Janez Primožič | Lada Smole | Roman Veras; Janez Pohar | no competition | Janez Pohar; Vida Leskovar |
| 1959 | Oki Drinovec | Mariča Amf | Oki Drinovec; Tomaž Pavčič | no competition | Tomaž Pavčič; Mariča Amf |
| 1960 | Oki Drinovec | Mariča Amf | Oki Drinovec; Tomaž Pavčič | Vida Leskovar; Meta Bogel | Oki Drinovec; Mariča Amf |
| 1961 | Jani Drinovec | Mariča Amf | Danče Pohar; Jani Drinovec | Vida Pohar; Meta Bogel | Tomaž Pavčič; Meta Bogel |
| 1962 | Jani Drinovec | Mariča Amf | Danče Pohar; Jani Drinovec | Mariča Amf; Meta Bogel | Danče Pohar; Mariča Amf |
| 1963 | Jani Drinovec | Meta Bogel | Danče Pohar; Jani Drinovec | Mariča Amf; Meta Bogel | Danče Pohar; Mariča Amf |
| 1964 | Tomaž Pavčič | Meta Bogel | Danče Pohar; Tomaž Pavčič | Mariča Amf; Meta Bogel | Danče Pohar; Mariča Amf |
| 1965 | Danče Pohar | Breda Križman | Danče Pohar; Tomaž Pavčič | Mariča Amf; Meta Bogel | Danče Pohar; Mariča Amf |
| 1966 | Danče Pohar | Marta Amf | Jani Drinovec; Janez Jereb | Mariča Amf; Meta Bogel | Danče Pohar; Mariča Amf |
| 1967 | Danče Pohar | Lučka Križman | Danče Pohar; Tomaž Pavčič | Lučka Križman; Breda Križman | Mitja Žorga; Marta Amf |
| 1968 | Danče Pohar | Lučka Križman | Mitja Žorga; Slavko Županič | Lučka Križman; Breda Križman | Danče Pohar; Mariča Amf |
| 1969 | Danče Pohar | Lučka Križman | Danče Pohar; Tomaž Pavčič | Lučka Križman; Breda Križman | Slavko Županič; Lučka Križman |
| 1970 | Gregor Berden | Lučka Križman | Gregor Berden; Slavko Županič | Lučka Križman; Breda Križman | Gregor Berden; Vita Bohinc |
| 1971 | Gregor Berden | Marta Amf | Gregor Berden; Slavko Županič | Lučka Križman; Breda Križman | Gregor Berden; Marta Amf |
| 1972 | Stane Koprivšek | Vita Bohinc | Gregor Berden; Slavko Županič | Marta Amf; Vita Bohinc | Gregor Berden; Marta Amf |
| 1973 | Stane Koprivšek | Lučka Križman | Stane Koprivšek; Jani Čaleta | Marta Amf; Lučka Križman | Stane Koprivšek; Vita Bohinc |
| 1974 | Gregor Berden | Vita Bohinc | Stane Koprivšek; Jani Čaleta | Marta Amf; Vita Bohinc | Gregor Berden; Marta Amf |
| 1975 | Gregor Berden | Lučka Križman | Stane Koprivšek; Jani Čaleta | Marta Amf; Lučka Križman | Gregor Berden; Marta Amf |
| 1976 | Gregor Berden | Marta Amf | Stane Koprivšek; Jani Čaleta | Marta Amf; Lučka Križman | Gregor Berden; Marta Amf |
| 1977 | Gregor Berden | Lučka Križman | Stane Koprivšek; Jani Čaleta | Marta Amf; Lučka Križman | Gregor Berden; Marta Amf |
| 1978 | Miha Šepec | Lučka Križman | Stane Koprivšek; Jani Čaleta | Mateja Strmole; Maja Atanasijević | Miha Šepec; Tanja Kovač |
| 1979 | Gregor Berden | Vita Miklič | Slavko Županič; Gregor Zore | Mariča Pohar; Marta Kovač | Gregor Berden; Marta Kovač |
| 1980 | Stane Koprivšek | Vita Miklič | Stane Koprivšek; Jani Čaleta | Lučka Križman; Marta Kovač | Stane Koprivšek; Lučka Križman |
| 1981 | Gregor Berden | Tanja Kovač | Gregor Berden; Miha Vilar | Maja Atanasijević; Marta Kovač | Gregor Berden; Marta Kovač |
| 1982 | Miha Šepec | Tanja Kovač | Stane Koprivšek; Jani Čaleta | Tanja Kovač; Vita Miklič | Gregor Berden; Marta Kovač |
| 1983 | Miha Šepec | Marta Kovač | Gregor Berden; Miha Vilar | Maja Atanasijević; Marta Kovač | Gregor Berden; Marta Kovač |
| 1984 | Miha Šepec | Vita Miklič | Gregor Berden; Miha Vilar | Tanja Šepec; Vita Miklič | Miha Šepec; Tanja Šepec |
| 1985 | Miha Šepec | Marta Kovač | Bojan Erjavec; Miha Vilar | Maja Nagode; Marta Kovač | Miha Šepec; Vita Miklič |
| 1986 | Miha Šepec | Tanja Šepec | Stane Koprivšek; Jani Čaleta | Maja Nagode; Marta Kovač | Miha Šepec; Tanja Šepec |
| 1987 | Miha Šepec | Tanja Šepec | Bojan Erjavec; Miha Vilar | Maja Nagode; Marta Kovač | Gregor Berden; Marta Kovač |
| 1988 | Aleš Babnik | Maja Nagode | Stane Koprivšek; Bojan Erjavec | Maja Nagode; Marta Kovač | Miha Villar; Maja Nagode |
| 1989 | Sašo Zrnec | Maja Nagode | Bojan Strah; Miha Vilar | Maja Nagode; Marta Kovač | Bojan Strah; Marta Kovač |
| 1990 | Sašo Zrnec | Maja Nagode | Bojan Strah; Miha Vilar | Maja Nagode; Marta Kovač | Miha Šepec; Tanja Šepec |
| 1991 | Sašo Zrnec | Maja Nagode | Stane Koprivšek; Bojan Erjavec | Maja Nagode; Janja Čarman | Miha Villar; Maja Nagode |
| 1992 | Sašo Zrnec | Maja Pohar | Stane Koprivšek; Bojan Erjavec | Maja Pohar; Urša Jovan | Andrej Pohar; Maja Pohar |
| 1993 | Miha Košnik | Mateja Slatnar | Bojan Strah; Miha Vilar | Mateja Slatnar; Darja Kranjc | Andrej Pohar; Maja Pohar |
| 1994 | Sašo Zrnec | Maja Pohar | Jaka Pelhan; Miho Šepec | Maja Pohar; Urša Jovan | Andrej Pohar; Maja Pohar |
| 1995 | Andrej Pohar | Maja Pohar | Aleš Babnik; Mišo Mattias | Maja Pohar; Urša Jovan | Andrej Pohar; Maja Pohar |
| 1996 | Andrej Pohar | Maja Pohar | Andrej Pohar; Simon Hawlina | Mateja Slatnar; Darja Kranjc | Andrej Pohar; Maja Pohar |
| 1997 | Andrej Pohar | Darja Kranjc | Andrej Pohar; Simon Hawlina | Darja Kranjc; Urša Jovan | Simon Hawlina; Tina Pelhan |
| 1998 | Andrej Pohar | Maja Pohar | Andrej Pohar; Simon Hawlina | Darja Kranjc; Mateja Slatnar | Andrej Pohar; Maja Pohar |
| 1999 | Andrej Pohar | Maja Pohar | Andrej Pohar; Simon Hawlina | Tinka Pelhan; Nina Pulko | Andrej Pohar; Maja Pohar |
| 2000 | Andrej Pohar | Maja Pohar | Andrej Pohar; Simon Hawlina | Maja Pohar; Tinka Pelhan | Andrej Pohar; Maja Pohar |
| 2001 | Andrej Pohar | Maja Pohar | Andrej Pohar; Aleš Murn | Maja Pohar; Tinka Pelhan | Andrej Pohar; Maja Pohar |
| 2002 | Andrej Pohar | Maja Pohar | Miha Horvat; Denis Pešehonov | Maja Pohar; Maja Tvrdy | Andrej Pohar; Maja Pohar |
| 2003 | Andrej Pohar | Maja Pohar | Andrej Pohar; Aleš Murn | Maja Kersnik; Maja Tvrdy | Aleš Murn; Maja Pohar |
| 2004 | Andrej Pohar | Maja Tvrdy | Andrej Pohar; Aleš Murn | Maja Kersnik; Maja Tvrdy | Andrej Pohar; Maja Pohar |
| 2005 | Luka Petrič | Maja Kersnik | Andrej Pohar; Miha Šepec | Maja Pohar; Ana Kovač | Andrej Pohar; Maja Pohar |
| 2006 | Luka Petrič | Maja Tvrdy | Miha Horvat; Denis Pešehonov | Maja Pohar; Ana Kovač | Luka Petrič; Maja Tvrdy |
| 2007 | Luka Petrič | Maja Tvrdy | Andrej Pohar; Miha Šepec | Maja Pohar; Maja Kersnik | Andrej Pohar; Maja Pohar |
| 2008 | Aleš Murn | Maja Tvrdy | Aleš Murn; Dušan Skerbiš jr. | Nika Švaljek; Taja Borštnar | Aleš Murn; Špela Silvester |
| 2009 | Iztok Utroša | Maja Tvrdy | Aleš Murn; Miha Šepec | Maja Tvrdy; Matevž Bajuk | Aleš Murn; Špela Silvester |
| 2010 | Luka Petrič | Špela Silvester | Miha Horvat; Iztok Utroša | Maja Kersnik; Špela Silvester | Aleš Murn; Špela Silvester |
| 2011 | Luka Petrič | Maja Tvrdy | Miha Horvat; Luka Petrič | Tina Kodrič; Urška Polc | Luka Petrič; Tina Kodrič |
| 2012 | Luka Petrič | Maja Tvrdy | Miha Horvat; Iztok Utroša | Tina Kodrič; Urška Polc | Luka Petrič; Tina Kodrič |
| 2013 | Iztok Utroša | Maja Tvrdy | Miha Horvat; Iztok Utroša | Maja Tvrdy; Živa Repše | Luka Petrič; Tina Kodrič |
| 2014 | Iztok Utroša | Kaja Stanković | Miha Horvat; Iztok Utroša | Katarina Beton; Ana Marija Šetina | Iztok Utroša; Nika Koncut |
| 2015 | Iztok Utroša | Kaja Stanković | Luka Petrič; Alen Roj | Nika Arih; Kaja Stanković | Luka Petrič; Tina Kodrič |
| 2016 | Iztok Utroša | Tina Kodrič | Miha Horvat; Iztok Utroša | Kaja Stanković; Ana Marija Šetina | Luka Petrič; Tina Kodrič |
| 2017 | Matevž Bajuk | Kaja Stanković | Miha Ivanič; Andraž Krapež | Iza Šalehar; Lia Šalehar | Urban Turk; Ana Marija Šetina |
| 2018 | Miha Ivanič | Kaja Stanković | Matevž Bajuk; Mitja Šemrov | Iza Šalehar; Lia Šalehar | Miha Ivančič; Petra Polanc |
| 2019 | Miha Ivanič | Petra Polanc | Aljoša Turk; Urban Turk | Petra Polanc; Kaja Stanković | Miha Ivančič; Petra Polanc |
