= Kerry Ann Sheppard =

Welsh international badminton player

Personal information
- Nationality: British (Welsh)
- Born: 19 April 1984 South Glamorgan, Wales

Sport
- Sport: Badminton
Medal record
Representing Wales
Welsh Nationals
Gold medal – first place	2009	women's doubles

Kerry Ann Sheppard (born 19 April 1984) is a former international badminton player from Wales who competed at the Commonwealth Games and is a former champion of Wales.

== Biography ==
Sheppard won four Welsh national junior titles, one each with Sian Jones and Rachel Madeley respectively in the women's doubles and two mixed doubles titles with Liam Ingram.

Sheppard specialised in doubles play and women's doubles partners included Caroline Harvey, Sian Jones, Rachel Madeley and Joanna Sullivan and in mixed doubles included Liam Ingram and Paul Le Tocq.

She soon represented Wales at international level and was selected for the Welsh team at the 2002 Commonwealth Games in Manchester, England, where she competed in the singles, women's doubles and mixed doubles events. At the Games, she partnered Ingram in the mixed doubles, losing to the Scottish pair Graeme Smith and Elinor Middlemiss. After the Games she continued to represent Wales.

Sheppard was the 2009 doubles champion of Wales at the Welsh National Badminton Championships, with Caroline Harvey and coached after her playing career ended.

She was a director and chairperson of Badminton Wales from January 2016 to September 2022.
