= Miha Šepec =

Miha Šepec may refer to:

- Miha Šepec, Sr.
- Miha Šepec, Jr.
