= Maja Pohar =

Slovenian badminton player

Personal information
- Born: 8 April 1976 (age 50) Ljubljana, SFR Yugoslavia
- Height: 1.74 m (5 ft 9 in)
- Weight: 60 kg (132 lb)

Sport
- Country: Slovenia
- Sport: Badminton
- Handedness: Right
- Event: Women's singles & doubles

Women's singles & doubles
- BWF profile

Maja Pohar Perme (born 8 April 1976) is a Slovenian former badminton player affiliated with Olimpija club. She competed at the 2000 Summer Olympics in Sydney, Australia. Her brother Andrej Pohar also a professional badminton player, and the duo played in the mixed doubles event. She won 33 times National Championships title, 10 in the women's singles, 9 in the women's doubles, and 14 in the mixed doubles event.

Pohar received her Master of Statistics and Ph.D. in University of Ljubljana. She is an associate professor of biostatistics at the Medical faculty of the University of Ljubljana and teaches both medical students as well as statistics students at masters and PhD level. As statistician, she is the co-editor of the Slovenian Medical Journal.

== Achievements ==
=== IBF International ===
Women's singles
Year	Tournament	Opponent	Score	Result
1996	Slovenian International	(France) Sandra Dimbour	5–11, 9–12	(silver) Runner-up
1997	Czech International	(Scotland) Anne Gibson	9–5, 4–9, 3–9, 0–9	(silver) Runner-up
1997	Slovenian International	(England) Joanne Muggeridge	1–11, 2–11	(silver) Runner-up
1997	Spanish International	(China) Li Li	11–7, 11–7	(gold) Winner
1998	Slovenian International	(England) Joanne Muggeridge	7–11, 6–11	(silver) Runner-up
1999	Croatian International	(Ukraine) Natalja Esipenko	11–5, 11–0	(gold) Winner
1999	Romanian International	(Bulgaria) Neli Nedyalkova	11–8, 11–5	(gold) Winner
1999	Slovenian International	(France) Sandra Dimbour	11–8, 11–6	(gold) Winner
2000	Strasbourg International			(gold) Winner
2000	Victorian International	(Japan) Miyo Akao	11–7, 7–11, 11–6	(gold) Winner
2000	La Chaux-de-Fonds International	(Russia) Ella Karachkova	4–11, 2–11	(silver) Runner-up
2000	Hungarian International	(Spain) Yoana Martínez	11–5, 11–0	(gold) Winner
2001	La Chaux-de-Fonds International	(Ukraine) Natalja Esipenko	5–7, 7–2, 7–2, 7–5	(gold) Winner
2001	Slovenian International	(Bulgaria) Petya Nedelcheva	2–7, 7–0, 8–6, 7–2	(gold) Winner
2001	Hungarian International	(Bulgaria) Petya Nedelcheva	1–7, 7–5, 5–7	(silver) Runner-up
2003	Strasbourg International			(gold) Winner

Women's doubles
Year	Tournament	Partner	Opponent	Score	Result
1998	Slovenian International	(Slovenia) Maja Tvrdy	(England) Felicity Gallup (England) Joanne Muggeridge	9–15, 7–15	(silver) Runner-up
1999	Croatian International	(Slovenia) Maja Tvrdy	(Ukraine) Natalja Esipenko (Ukraine) Natalia Golovkina	4–15, 6–15	(silver) Runner-up

Mixed doubles
Year	Tournament	Partner	Opponent	Score	Result
1996	Slovak International	(Slovenia) Andrej Pohar	(Denmark) Lars Paaske (Denmark) Sarah Jonsson	8–15, 18–16, 15–7	(gold) Winner
1996	Spanish International	(Slovenia) Andrej Pohar	(France) Manuel Dubrulle (France) Sandrine Lefèvre	9–15, 12–15	(silver) Runner-up
1997	Slovak International	(Slovenia) Andrej Pohar	(Denmark) Michael Lamp (Denmark) Rikke Broen	6–15, 2–15	(silver) Runner-up
1997	Hungarian International	(Slovenia) Andrej Pohar	(Netherlands) Norbert van Barneveld (Netherlands) Lotte Jonathans	9–5, 4–9, 3–9, 5–9	(silver) Runner-up
1998	Slovenian International	(Slovenia) Andrej Pohar	(Spain) José Antonio Crespo (Spain) Dolores Marco	15–2, 11–15, 15–8	(gold) Winner
1999	Austrian International	(Slovenia) Andrej Pohar	(Scotland) Kenny Middlemiss (Scotland) Kirsteen McEwan	12–15, 11–15	(silver) Runner-up
1999	Romanian International	(Slovenia) Andrej Pohar	(Russia) Alexandr Russkikh (Russia) Anastasia Russkikh	15–7, 15–3	(gold) Winner
1999	Slovenian International	(Slovenia) Andrej Pohar	(Poland) Marcin Rynkiewicz (Poland) Angelika Węgrzyn	15–7, 15–3	(gold) Winner
2000	Strasbourg International	(Slovenia) Andrej Pohar			(gold) Winner
2000	Peru International	(Slovenia) Andrej Pohar	(Canada) Mike Beres (Canada) Kara Solmundson	1–15, 10–15	(silver) Runner-up
2000	La Chaux-de-Fonds International	(Slovenia) Andrej Pohar	(Russia) Pavel Uvarov (Russia) Ella Karachkova	8–15, 5–15	(silver) Runner-up
2001	Spanish International	(Slovenia) Andrej Pohar	(England) Peter Jeffrey (England) Suzanne Rayappan	13–15, 7–15	(silver) Runner-up
2001	Hungarian International	(Slovenia) Andrej Pohar	(Sweden) Daniel Glaser (Sweden) Johanna Persson	7–5, 7–1, 7–1	(gold) Winner
2005	Croatian International	(Slovenia) Andrej Pohar	(Singapore) Hendra Wijaya (Singapore) Frances Liu	11–15, 15–13, 7–15	(silver) Runner-up
