= Maja Tvrdy =

Slovenian badminton player (born 1983)

Personal information
- Born: 20 November 1983 (age 42) Ljubljana, Slovenia
- Height: 5.6 in (14 cm)

Sport
- Country: Slovenia
- Sport: Badminton
- Handedness: Right

Women's Singles
- Highest ranking: 43 (WS) 17 December 2009; 72 (WD with Spela Silvester) 29 October 2009; 67 (XD with Iztok Utrosa) 22 October 2009
- Current ranking: retired
- BWF profile
Medal record
Representing Slovenia
Mediterranean Games
Bronze medal – third place	2013 Mersin	Singles
Bronze medal – third place	2013 Mersin	Doubles

Maja Tvrdy (born 20 November 1983) is a Slovenian badminton player. She competed for Slovenia at the 2012 Summer Olympics.

Maja Tvrdy is the most successful badminton player of Slovenia, who participated and represented Slovenia at two Olympic Games: 2008 Summer Olympic Games in Beijing, where she achieved 17th place in the individual event and the Summer Olympic Games 2012 in London, where she lost in the qualifying round. She is only the second Slovenian female player to participate at any Olympic Games in this sport (after Maja Pohar – Sydney Olympics in 2000).

She won two bronze medals at Mediterranean Games in Mersin 2013 – 3rd place in the individual event and 3rd place in women's doubles event, partnered by Nika Koncut.

== Achievements ==
=== Mediterranean Games ===
Women's singles
Year	Venue	Opponent	Score	Result
2013	Mersin University Hall; Mersin, Turkey	(Italy) Agnese Allegrini	21–16, 21–16	Bronze

Women's doubles

Year	Venue	Match	Partner	Opponent	Score	Result
2013	Mersin University Hall, Mersin, Turkey	1	(Slovenia) Nika Končut	(France) Émilie Lefel (France) Audrey Fontaine	23–25, 12–21	Bronze
2013	Mersin University Hall, Mersin, Turkey	2	(Slovenia) Nika Končut	(Turkey) Neslihan Yiğit (Turkey) Özge Bayrak	13–21, 16–21	Bronze
2013	Mersin University Hall, Mersin, Turkey	3	(Slovenia) Nika Končut	(Italy) Karin Maran (Italy) Xandra Stelling	21–12, 21–10	Bronze

=== BWF International Challenge/Series ===
Women's singles
Year	Tournament	Opponent	Score	Result
2013	Mercosul International	(Brazil) Lohaynny Vicente	21–11, 21–13	(gold) Winner
2010	Slovenian International	(Belgium) Lianne Tan	16–21, 16–21	(silver) Runner-up
2009	Puerto Rico International	(Canada) Anna Rice	21–13, 12–21, 13–21	(silver) Runner-up
2009	Santo Domingo Open	(Canada) Anna Rice	21–19, 21–23, 21–18	(gold) winner
2009	Slovenian International	(Belgium) Lianne Tan	21–10, 21–16	(gold) Winner
2008	Hungarian International	(Bulgaria) Petya Nedelcheva	11–21, 8–21	(silver) Runner-up
2007	Pakistan International	(Slovenia) Maja Kersnik	11–21, 22–20, 21–15	(gold) Winner
2007	Jordan Satellite	(Portugal) Telma Santos	21–15, 21–18	(gold) Winner
2007	Mauritius International	(Italy) Agnese Allegrini	21–18, 9–21, 20–22	(silver) Runner-up
2006	Lithuanian International	(Estonia) Kati Tolmoff	19–21, 21–15, 21–15	(gold) Winner
2006	Slovak International	(Ukraine) Maria Martynenko	21–18, 21–14	(gold) Winner
2006	Israel International	no record	no record	(gold) Winner
2004	Italian International	(Denmark) Line Isberg	11–2, 11–8	(gold) Winner

Women's doubles
Year	Tournament	Partner	Opponent	Score	Result
2007	Mauritius International	(Portugal) Ana Moura	(South Africa) Michelle Edwards (South Africa) Chantal Botts	21–16, 21–18	(gold) Winner

Commonwealth Youth Games tournament
BWF International Series tournament
BWF Future Series tournament

=== Slovenian National Badminton Championships ===
She is 14-times Slovenian National Badminton Championships winner:

- 8-times national champion in the individual event (in the years 2004, 2006, 2007, 2008, 2009, 2011, 2012, 2013).
- 5-times national champion in women's doubles event (in 2002 – partnered by Maja Pohar, 2003 – partnered by Maja Kersnik, 2004 – partnered by Maja Kersnik, 2009 – partnered by Špela Silvester, 2013 – partnered by Živa Repše)
- 1-time national champion in mixed doubles (in 2006 – partnered by Luka Petrič)
