= Liam Ingram =

Welsh international badminton player

Personal information
- Nationality: British (Welsh)
- Born: c. 1985

Sport
- Sport: Badminton

Liam Ingram (born c.1985) is a former international badminton player from Wales who competed at the Commonwealth Games.

== Biography ==
As a junior, Ingram won the South West of England boys U12 singles in 1997, the 1998 Gloucester Open and 1999 Liverpool Open.

He represented Mid Glamorgan at county level and went on to win three Welsh national junior titles, one with Richard Williams in the men's doubles and two mixed doubles titles with Kerry Ann Sheppard.

Ingram was soon capped at full senior international level and represented the Welsh team at the 2002 Commonwealth Games in Manchester, England, where he competed in the singles, men's doubles and mixed doubles events. At the Games partnering Sheppard, they lost to the Scottish pair Graeme Smith and Elinor Middlemiss in the mixed doubles competition. In the men's doubles with Neil Cottrill they lost to Sanave Thomas and Valiyaveetil Diju.

After the Games he continued to represent Wales.
