= 1971 European Junior Badminton Championships =

Badminton championships

Tournament details
- Dates: 16 – 18 April
- Edition: 2nd
- Venue: Zimní Stadion, Gottwaldov
- Location: Gottwaldov, Czechoslovakia (now Czech Republic)

The 1971 European Junior Badminton Championships was the second edition of the European Junior Badminton Championships. It was held in Gottwaldov, Czechoslovakia, in the month of April. Danish players won both the Girls' singles and doubles while England won Boys' doubles and Mixed doubles. Netherlands' Rob Ridder won the Boys' singles title.

== Medalists ==
Discipline	Gold	Silver	Bronze
Boys' singles	(Netherlands) Rob Ridder	(Denmark) Søren Christensen	(Denmark) Viggo Christiansen
Boys' singles	(Netherlands) Rob Ridder	(Denmark) Søren Christensen	(Denmark) Ulrik Bo Hansen
Girls' singles	(Denmark) Anne Berglund	(Netherlands) Marjan Luesken	(East Germany) Monika Thiere
Girls' singles	(Denmark) Anne Berglund	(Netherlands) Marjan Luesken	(Socialist Federal Republic of Yugoslavia) Lučka Križman
Boys' doubles	(England) Peter Gardner (England) John Stretch	(Sweden) Sven-Ove Kellermalm (Sweden) Håkan Linnarsson	(Denmark) Anders Andersen (Denmark) Ulrik Bo Hansen
Boys' doubles	(England) Peter Gardner (England) John Stretch	(Sweden) Sven-Ove Kellermalm (Sweden) Håkan Linnarsson	(Denmark) Søren Christiansen (Denmark) Viggo Christiansen
Girls' doubles	(Denmark) Anne Berglund (Denmark) Lene Køppen	(England) Nora Gardner (England) Barbara Giles	(Denmark) Lone Rasmussen (Denmark) Susanne Mølgaard Hansen
Girls' doubles	(Denmark) Anne Berglund (Denmark) Lene Køppen	(England) Nora Gardner (England) Barbara Giles	(Netherlands) Marjan Luesken (Netherlands) Henny Wesdorp
Mixed doubles	(England) Peter Gardner (England) Barbara Giles	(England) John Stretch (England) Nora Gardner	(Denmark) Viggo Christiansen (Denmark) Lene Køppen
Mixed doubles	(England) Peter Gardner (England) Barbara Giles	(England) John Stretch (England) Nora Gardner	(Netherlands) Rob Ridder (Netherlands) Marjan Luesken

== Medal table ==
Rank	Nation	Gold	Silver	Bronze	Total
1	England (ENG)	2	2	0	4
2	Denmark (DEN)	2	1	6	9
3	Netherlands (NED)	1	1	2	4
4	Sweden (SWE)	0	1	0	1
5	East Germany (DDR)	0	0	1	1
5	Yugoslavia (YUG)	0	0	1	1
Totals (6 entries)		5	5	10	20

== Results ==
=== Semi-finals ===
Category	Winner	Runner-up	Score
Boys' singles	(Netherlands) Rob Ridder	(Denmark) Viggo Christiansen	15–12, 10–15, 15–10
Boys' singles	(Denmark) Søren Christensen	(Denmark) Ulrik Bo Hansen	15–2, 15–9
Girls' singles	(Netherlands) Marjan Luesken	(East Germany) Monika Thiere	11–1, 3–11, 11–3
Girls' singles	(Denmark) Anne Berglund	(Socialist Federal Republic of Yugoslavia) Lučka Križman	11–0, 11–4
Boys' doubles	(England) John Stretch (England) Peter Gardner	(Denmark) Anders Andersen (Denmark) Ulrik Bo Hansen	14–17, 15–7, 15–10
Boys' doubles	(Sweden) Håkan Linnarsson (Sweden) Sven-Ove Kellermalm	(Denmark) Søren Christiansen (Denmark) Viggo Christiansen	8–15, 15–8, 15–11
Girls' doubles	(England) Barbara Giles (England) Nora Gardner	(Denmark) Lone Rasmussen (Denmark) Susanne Mølgaard Hansen	15–5, 15–6
Girls' doubles	(Denmark) Anne Berglund (Denmark) Lene Køppen	(Netherlands) Henny Wesdorp (Netherlands) Marjan Luesken	15–13, 15–9
Mixed doubles	(England) Peter Gardner (England) Barbara Giles	(Denmark) Viggo Christiansen (Denmark) Lene Køppen	15–13, 17–14
Mixed doubles	(England) John Stretch (England) Nora Gardner	(Netherlands) Rob Ridder (Netherlands) Marjan Luesken	15–9, 15–11

=== Finals ===
Category	Winners	Runners-up	Score
Boys' singles	(Netherlands) Rob Ridder	(Denmark) Søren Christensen	15–10, 15–10
Girls' singles	(Denmark) Anne Berglund	(Netherlands) Marjan Luesken	11–2, 12–9
Boys' doubles	(England) John Stretch (England) Peter Gardner	(Sweden) Håkan Linnarsson (Sweden) Sven-Ove Kellermalm	18–13, 12–15, 18–15
Girls' doubles	(Denmark) Anne Berglund (Denmark) Lene Køppen	(England) Barbara Giles (England) Nora Gardner	15–11, 15–7
Mixed doubles	(England) Peter Gardner (England) Barbara Giles	(England) John Stretch (England) Nora Gardner	17–16, 18–14
