= Slovenia Open (badminton) =

Badminton championships

The Slovenian International in badminton is an international open held in Slovenia regularly since 1993.

It took place also as unofficial international championship from 1963 until 1976, when Slovenia was part of Yugoslavia. There are several events at the Slovenian International, men's singles, women's singles, men's doubles, women's doubles, and mixed doubles.

== Previous winners ==
=== Slovenia Open ===
Year	Men's singles	Women's singles	Men's doubles	Women's doubles	Mixed doubles	Ref
1963	(Austria) Bernd Frohnwieser	(Austria) Hilde Themel	(Austria) Bernd Frohnwieser (Austria) Harald Pirsch	(Socialist Federal Republic of Yugoslavia) Mariča Amf (Socialist Federal Republic of Yugoslavia) Meta Bogel	(Austria) Bernd Frohnwieser (Austria) Hilde Themel	
1964	(Socialist Federal Republic of Yugoslavia) Tomaž Pavčič	(Socialist Federal Republic of Yugoslavia) Mariča Amf	(Socialist Federal Republic of Yugoslavia) Oki Drinovec (Socialist Federal Republic of Yugoslavia) Jani Drinovec	(Socialist Federal Republic of Yugoslavia) Mariča Amf (Socialist Federal Republic of Yugoslavia) Meta Bogel	(Austria) Helmut Kraule (Socialist Federal Republic of Yugoslavia) Breda Križman	
1965	(England) Michael Rawlings	(Socialist Federal Republic of Yugoslavia) Meta Bogel	(Austria) Bernd Frohnwieser (Austria) Harald Pirsch	(Austria) Johanna Holzer (Czechoslovakia) Nina Pomahacová	(Czechoslovakia) Vladimir Zrno (Czechoslovakia) Alena Mládková	
1966	(West Germany) Franz Beinvogl	(Austria) Hilde Kreulitsch	(West Germany) Franz Beinvogl (West Germany) Rupert Liebl	(Austria) Hilde Kreulitsch (Austria) Anni Fritzer	(Austria) Bernd Frohnwieser (Austria) Hilde Kreulitsch	
1967	(West Germany) Franz Beinvogl	(Czechoslovakia) Irena Červenková	(West Germany) Franz Beinvogl (Socialist Federal Republic of Yugoslavia) Jani Drinovec	(Austria) Hilde Kreulitsch (Austria) Anni Fritzer	(West Germany) Franz Beinvogl (West Germany) Inge Mönch	
1968	No competition					
1969	(West Germany) Otto Eckarth	(Socialist Federal Republic of Yugoslavia) Lučka Križman	(Socialist Federal Republic of Yugoslavia) Mitja Žorga (Socialist Federal Republic of Yugoslavia) Slavko Županič	(Socialist Federal Republic of Yugoslavia) Marta Amf (Socialist Federal Republic of Yugoslavia) Vita Bohinc	(Socialist Federal Republic of Yugoslavia) Slavko Županič (Socialist Federal Republic of Yugoslavia) Lučka Križman	
1970	(Socialist Federal Republic of Yugoslavia) Danče Pohar	(Socialist Federal Republic of Yugoslavia) Lučka Križman	(West Germany) Otto Eckarth (West Germany) Rudi Mahin	(Socialist Federal Republic of Yugoslavia) Lučka Križman (Socialist Federal Republic of Yugoslavia) Breda Križman	(Socialist Federal Republic of Yugoslavia) Danče Pohar (Socialist Federal Republic of Yugoslavia) Mariča Amf	
1971	(West Germany) Franz Beinvogl	(Socialist Federal Republic of Yugoslavia) Lučka Križman	(West Germany) Otto Eckarth (West Germany) Erich Mader	(Socialist Federal Republic of Yugoslavia) Lučka Križman (Socialist Federal Republic of Yugoslavia) Breda Križman	(West Germany) Franz Beinvogl (Socialist Federal Republic of Yugoslavia) Vita Bohinc	
1972	No competition					
1973	(Socialist Federal Republic of Yugoslavia) Stane Koprivšek	(Socialist Federal Republic of Yugoslavia) Lučka Križman	(Socialist Federal Republic of Yugoslavia) Gregor Berden (Socialist Federal Republic of Yugoslavia) Stane Koprivšek	(Socialist Federal Republic of Yugoslavia) Lučka Križman (Socialist Federal Republic of Yugoslavia) Marta Amf	(Socialist Federal Republic of Yugoslavia) Gregor Berden (Socialist Federal Republic of Yugoslavia) Marta Amf	
1974	(Socialist Federal Republic of Yugoslavia) Stane Koprivšek	(Hungary) Ildikó Szabó	(Socialist Federal Republic of Yugoslavia) Gregor Berden (Socialist Federal Republic of Yugoslavia) Stane Koprivšek	(Socialist Federal Republic of Yugoslavia) Lučka Križman (Socialist Federal Republic of Yugoslavia) Marta Amf	(Socialist Federal Republic of Yugoslavia) Gregor Berden (Socialist Federal Republic of Yugoslavia) Marta Amf	
1975	(West Germany) Otto Eckarth	(Socialist Federal Republic of Yugoslavia) Lučka Križman	(Socialist Federal Republic of Yugoslavia) Gregor Berden (Socialist Federal Republic of Yugoslavia) Slavko Županič	(Hungary) Éva Cserni (Hungary) Ildikó Szabó	(Hungary) Janos Cserni (Hungary) Éva Cserni	
1976	(Socialist Federal Republic of Yugoslavia) Gregor Berden	(Hungary) Éva Cserni	(Socialist Federal Republic of Yugoslavia) Stane Koprivšek (Socialist Federal Republic of Yugoslavia) Jani Caleta	(West Germany) Erika Meisenhalter (West Germany) Herta Schwarz	(Socialist Federal Republic of Yugoslavia) Gregor Berden (Socialist Federal Republic of Yugoslavia) Marta Amf	
1977– 1992	No competition					
1993	(Austria) Hannes Fuchs	(Hungary) Andrea Harsági	(Ukraine) Vladislav Druzchenko (Ukraine) Valerij Strelcov	(Ukraine) Elena Nozdran (Ukraine) Ira Koloskova	(Ukraine) Valerij Strelcov (Ukraine) Elena Nozdran	
1994	(Austria) Jürgen Koch	(Austria) Irina Serova	(Portugal) Fernando Silva (Portugal) Ricardo Fernandes	(Russia) Svetlana Alferova (Russia) Elena Denisova	(Russia) Artur Khachaturyan (Russia) Svetlana Alferova	
1995	(Slovenia) Denis Pešehonov	(Slovenia) Maja Pohar	(Switzerland) Stephan Schneider (Switzerland) Markus Hegar	(Slovenia) Maja Pohar (Slovenia) Urša Jovan	(Slovenia) Andrej Pohar (Slovenia) Maja Pohar	
1996	(Belgium) Pedro Vanneste	(France) Sandra Dimbour	(France) Manuel Dubrulle (France) Vincent Laigle	(Hungary) Andrea Dakó (Hungary) Melinda Keszthelyi	(France) Manuel Dubrulle (France) Sandrine Lefèvre	
1997	(Belgium) Pedro Vanneste	(England) Joanne Muggeridge	(Scotland) Russell Hogg (Scotland) Kenny Middlemiss	(Scotland) Elinor Middlemiss (Scotland) Sandra Watt	(Scotland) Kenny Middlemiss (Scotland) Elinor Middlemiss	
1998	(Slovenia) Andrej Pohar	(England) Joanne Muggeridge	(United States) Mark Manha (United States) Howard Bach	(England) Joanne Muggeridge (England) Felicity Gallup	(Slovenia) Andrej Pohar (Slovenia) Maja Pohar	
1999	(Wales) Richard Vaughan	(Germany) Katja Michalowsky	(France) Manuel Dubrulle (France) Vincent Laigle	(Switzerland) Corinne Jörg (Switzerland) Fabienne Baumeyer	(Slovenia) Andrej Pohar (Slovenia) Maja Pohar	
2000	(England) Colin Haughton	(Denmark) Anne Maria Pedersen	(Denmark) Mathias Boe (Denmark) Michael Jensen	(Denmark) Britta Andersen (Denmark) Lene Mørk	(Denmark) Mathias Boe (Denmark) Britta Andersen	
2001	(France) Nabil Lasmari	(Slovenia) Maja Pohar	(Russia) Nikolay Zuev (Russia) Stanislav Pukhov	(Russia) Elena Shimko (Russia) Marina Yakusheva	(Russia) Nikolay Zuev (Russia) Marina Yakusheva	
2002	(Austria) Jürgen Koch	(Bulgaria) Petya Nedelcheva	(Denmark) Rasmus Andersen (Denmark) Carsten Mogensen	(Russia) Ekaterina Ananina (Russia) Anastasia Russkikh	(Russia) Alexandr Russkikh (Russia) Anastasia Russkikh	
2003	(Japan) Shōji Satō	(England) Jill Pittard	(Russia) Nikolay Zuev (England) Nicholas Kidd	(Russia) Marina Yakusheva (Russia) Elena Shimko	(England) Simon Archer (England) Donna Kellogg	
2004– 2007	No competition					
2008	(Czech Republic) Jan Vondra	(Bulgaria) Linda Zechiri	(Austria) Michael Lahnsteiner (Austria) Peter Zauner	(Sweden) Emelie Lennartsson (Sweden) Emma Wengberg	(Bulgaria) Vladimir Metodiev (Bulgaria) Gabriela Banova	
2009	(England) Harry Wright	(Slovenia) Maja Tvrdy	(Austria) Jürgen Koch (Austria) Peter Zauner	(Germany) Johanna Goliszewski (Germany) Claudia Vogelgsang	(Austria) Peter Zauner (Austria) Simone Prutsch	
2010	(Spain) Pablo Abián	(Belgium) Lianne Tan	(Netherlands) Ruud Bosch (Netherlands) Koen Ridder	(Poland) Natalia Pocztowiak (Croatia) Staša Poznanovič	(China) Mao Hong (Poland) Natalia Pocztowiak	
2011	(Chinese Taipei) Hsu Jen-hao	(Germany) Carola Bott	(Poland) Lukasz Moren (Poland) Wojciech Szkudlarczyk	(Germany) Johanna Goliszewski (Germany) Carla Nelte	(Croatia) Zvonimir Đurkinjak (Croatia) Staša Poznanović	
2012	(England) Andrew Smith	(Switzerland) Nicole Schaller	(Croatia) Zvonimir Đurkinjak (Croatia) Zvonimir Hölbling	(Germany) Isabel Herttrich (Germany) Inken Wienefeld	(Croatia) Zvonimir Đurkinjak (Croatia) Staša Poznanović	
2013	(Malaysia) Ramdan Misbun	(Ukraine) Marija Ulitina	(Russia) Nikita Khakimov (Russia) Vasily Kuznetsov	(Netherlands) Alida Chen (Netherlands) Soraya de Visch Eijbergen	(Croatia) Zvonimir Đurkinjak (Croatia) Staša Poznanović	
2014	(Denmark) Flemming Quach	(Bulgaria) Stefani Stoeva	(Croatia) Zvonimir Đurkinjak (Croatia) Zvonimir Hölbling	(Bulgaria) Gabriela Stoeva (Bulgaria) Stefani Stoeva	(Denmark) Jeppe Ludvigsen (Denmark) Mai Surrow	
2015	(Ukraine) Dmytro Zavadsky	(Ukraine) Marija Ulitina	(Croatia) Zvonimir Đurkinjak (Croatia) Zvonimir Hölbling	(Germany) Linda Efler (Germany) Lara Kaepplein	(France) Bastian Kersaudy (France) Lea Palermo	
2016	(Scotland) Kieran Merrilees	(Denmark) Julie Dawall Jakobsen	(Republic of Ireland) Josh Magee (Republic of Ireland) Sam Magee	(England) Chloe Birch (England) Sarah Walker	(Denmark) Mikkel Mikkelsen (Denmark) Mai Surrow	
2017	(Netherlands) Erik Meijs	(Denmark) Julie Dawall Jakobsen	(Belgium) Matijs Dierickx (Belgium) Freek Golinski	(Russia) Olga Arkhangelskaya (Russia) Natalia Rogova	(Denmark) Mikkel Mikkelsen (Denmark) Mai Surrow	
2018	(England) Toby Penty	(China) Qi Xuefei	(Denmark) Jeppe Bay (Denmark) Rasmus Kjær	(Turkey) Bengisu Erçetin (Turkey) Nazlıcan İnci	(England) Gregory Mairs (England) Jenny Moore	
2019	(India) Sourabh Verma	(Spain) Clara Azurmendi	(Japan) Shohei Hoshino (Japan) Yujiro Nishikawa	(England) Jenny Moore (England) Victoria Williams	(England) Gregory Mairs (England) Victoria Williams	
2020	Cancelled (Note: This tournament, originally to be played from 13 to 16 May, was later cancelled due to the COVID-19 pandemic in Slovenia.)					
2021	(France) Arnaud Merklé	(Indonesia) Mutiara Ayu Puspitasari	(Indonesia) Putra Erwiansyah (Indonesia) Patra Harapan Rindorindo	(Malaysia) Low Yeen Yuan (Malaysia) Valeree Siow	(Malaysia) Choong Hon Jian (Malaysia) Toh Ee Wei	
2022	(Austria) Collins Valentine Filimon	(Chinese Taipei) Lin Hsiang-ti	(Chinese Taipei) Wei Chun-wei (Chinese Taipei) Wu Guan-xun	(Indonesia) Meilysa Trias Puspita Sari (Indonesia) Rachel Allessya Rose	(Denmark) Kristian Kræmer (Denmark) Amalie Cecilie Kudsk	
2023	(India) Sameer Verma	(Chinese Taipei) Huang Yu-hsun	(Malaysia) Low Hang Yee (Malaysia) Ng Eng Cheong	(Chinese Taipei) Liu Chiao-yun (Chinese Taipei) Wang Yu-qiao	(Denmark) Jesper Toft (Denmark) Clara Graversen	
2024	(Malaysia) Justin Hoh	(India) Rakshitha Ramraj	(Indonesia) Muhammad Al Farizi (Indonesia) Nikolaus Joaquin	(Indonesia) Siti Sarah Azzahra (Indonesia) Agnia Sri Rahayu	(Indonesia) Amri Syahnawi (Indonesia) Indah Cahya Sari Jamil	
2025	(Malaysia) Eogene Ewe	(Malaysia) Wong Ling Ching	(Chinese Taipei) Huang Tsung-i (Chinese Taipei) Lin Ting-yu	(Chinese Taipei) Lin Chih-chun (Chinese Taipei) Lin Wan-ching	(Chinese Taipei) Wu Guan-xun (Chinese Taipei) Lee Chia-hsin	
2026	(India) Sathish Karunakaran	(India) Ilishaa Pal	(Denmark) Robert Nebel (Denmark) Jeppe Søby	(Netherlands) Debora Jille (Netherlands) Meerte Loos	(India) Sathish Karunakaran (India) Zenith Abbigail	

=== Slovenia International ===
Year	Men's singles	Women's singles	Men's doubles	Women's doubles	Mixed doubles
2023	Cancelled				

=== Slovenia Future Series ===
Year	Men's singles	Women's singles	Men's doubles	Women's doubles	Mixed doubles	Ref
2018	(Serbia) Luka Milić	(Spain) Sara Peñalver	(Denmark) Oliver Gram (Denmark) Mads Thøgersen	(Croatia) Katarina Galenić (Croatia) Maja Pavlinić	(Slovenia) Miha Ivančič (Slovenia) Petra Polanc	
2019	(Denmark) Karan Rajan Rajarajan	(Switzerland) Jenjira Stadelmann	(Czech Republic) Jaromír Janáček (Czech Republic) Tomáš Švejda	(Denmark) Frederikke Lund (Denmark) Signe Schulz	(Slovenia) Miha Ivančič (Slovenia) Petra Polanc	
2020	Cancelled					
2021	(Indonesia) Andi Fadel Muhammad	(Denmark) Simona Pilgaard	(Denmark) William Kryger Boe (Denmark) Christian Faust Kjær	(Russia) Viktoriia Kozyreva (Russia) Mariia Sukhova	(Denmark) Mads Muurholm (Denmark) Clara Løber	
2022	(Indonesia) Andi Fadel Muhammad	(Japan) Tomoka Miyazaki	(Denmark) Rasmus Espersen (Denmark) Kristian Kræmer	(Japan) Hina Akechi (Japan) Sorano Yoshikawa	(Serbia) Mihajlo Tomić (Serbia) Andjela Vitman	
2023	(Denmark) Jakob Houe	(Israel) Heli Neiman	(Germany) Marvin Datko (Germany) Jarne Schlevoigt	(Italy) Martina Corsini (Sweden) Miranda Johansson	(Germany) Jarne Schlevoigt (Germany) Julia Meyer	
2024	(France) Enogat Roy	(France) Anna Tatranova	(Switzerland) Yann Orteu (Switzerland) Minh Quang Pham	(Switzerland) Lucie Amiguet (Switzerland) Caroline Racloz	(Slovenia) Miha Ivančič (Slovenia) Petra Polanc	
2025	(Japan) Minoru Koga	(Israel) Heli Neiman	(Germany) Marvin Datko (Germany) Aaron Sonnenschein	(Czech Republic) Kateřina Osladilová (Czech Republic) Sharleen van Coppenolle	(Slovenia) Miha Ivančič (Slovenia) Petra Polanc	
2026						

== Performances by countries ==
=== Slovenia Open ===
As of 2026 edition

Top countries
Pos	Country	MS	WS	MD	WD	XD	Total
1	Yugoslavia	5	7	6.5	7	6	31.5
2	Austria	5	3	4	2.5	3.5	18
3	Germany	5	2	3.5	5	1.5	17
4	Denmark	1	3	4	1	6	15
5	England	5	3	0.5	3	3	14.5
6	Russia			2.5	5	3	10.5
7	Slovenia	2	3		1	3	9
8	Chinese Taipei	1	2	2	2	1	8
9	France	2	1	2		2	7
9	Malaysia	3	1	1	1	1	7
11	Croatia			3	0.5	3	6.5
12	Hungary		3		2	1	6
12	India	3	2			1	6
12	Indonesia		1	2	2	1	6
12	Ukraine	1	2	1	1	1	6
16	Belgium	2	2	1			5
17	Bulgaria		2		1	1	4
17	Netherlands	1		1	2		4
17	Scotland	1		1	1	1	4
20	Switzerland		1	1	1		3
21	Czechoslovakia		1		0.5	1	2.5
22	Japan	1		1			2
22	Poland			1	0.5	0.5	2
22	Spain	1	1				2
25	China		1			0.5	1.5
26	Czech Republic	1					1
26	Ireland			1			1
26	Portugal			1			1
26	Sweden				1		1
26	Turkey				1		1
26	United States			1			1
26	Wales	1					1
Total		41	41	41	41	41	205

=== Slovenia Future Series ===
As of 2025 edition

Top countries
Pos	Country	MS	WS	MD	WD	XD	Total
1	Denmark	2	1	3	1	1	8
2	Slovenia					4	4
3	Germany			2		1	3
3	Japan	1	1		1		3
3	Switzerland		1	1	1		3
6	Czech Republic			1	1		2
6	France	1	1				2
6	Indonesia	2					2
6	Israel		2				2
6	Serbia	1				1	2
11	Croatia				1		1
11	Russia				1		1
11	Spain		1				1
14	Italy				0.5		0.5
14	Sweden				0.5		0.5
Total		7	7	7	7	7	35
