= Maja Kersnik =

Slovenian badminton player (born 1981)

Maja Kersnik (born April 17, 1981) is a badminton player from Slovenia.

She played at the 2005 World Badminton Championships and reached the second round, which she lost to Mia Audina of the Netherlands.

She has won five titles at the Slovenian National Badminton Championships.
