= Chris Blair (badminton) =

New Zealand badminton player (born 1978)

Medal record

Representing New Zealand

Men's badminton

Commonwealth Games
Bronze medal – third place	1998 Kuala Lumpur	Team
Bronze medal – third place	2002 Manchester	Mixed Team

Chris Blair (born 4 March 1978) is a male badminton player from New Zealand. At the 1998 Commonwealth Games he won a bronze medal in the men's team event. Four years later at the 2002 Commonwealth Games he won a bronze medal in the mixed team event.
