= Graham Simpson (badminton) =

Scottish international badminton player

Personal information
- Nationality: British (Scottish)
- Born: c.1979

Sport
- Sport: Badminton
- Club: Dumfries
Medal record
Representing Scotland
Commonwealth Games
| Bronze medal – third place | 2002 Manchester | Mixed team |
Scottish Nationals
| Gold medal – first place | 2003 | singles |

Graham Simpson (born c.1979) is a former international badminton player from Scotland who competed at the Commonwealth Games.

== Biography ==
Simpson was educated at Dumfries Academy and lived in Gloucester Avenue in Dumfries. He was selected to train with the Scottish international squad at the age of 17.

He made his international debut in 2000 and participated in his first major tournament at the Thomas Cup in February 2000.

Simpson represented the Scottish team at the 2002 Commonwealth Games in Manchester, England, where he competed in the badminton events, winning a bronze medal as part of the mixed team.

He was the singles champion at the 2003 Scottish National Badminton Championships.
