= Lučka Križman =

Slovenian badminton player (1953–2020)

Personal information
- Born: 1953 Ljubljana, SR Slovenia, Yugoslavia
- Died: 2020 (aged 66–67) Slovenia

Sport
- Country: Yugoslavia; Slovenia
- Sport: Badminton
- Handedness: Right
Medal record
Women's badminton
Representing Yugoslavia
Helvetia Cup
Silver medal – second place	1975 Antwerp	Mixed team
European Junior Championships
Bronze medal – third place	1971 Gottwaldov	Girls' singles

Lučka Križman (1953 – 2020) was a Slovenian former badminton player who represented Yugoslavia in the 1970s. She won Yugoslavia's first medal in badminton at the 1971 European Junior Badminton Championships.

Križman was one of the most influential badminton players in Slovenian history. She was an eight-time national champion in women's singles, a ten-time champion in women's doubles and a two-time champion in mixed doubles. She also won the Slovenian International in all three disciplines in the 1970s.

Križman was also part of the Yugoslavian team that won silver in the 1975 Helvetia Cup.

== Achievements ==
=== European Junior Championships ===
Girls' singles

Year	Venue	Opponent	Score	Result
1971	Zimní Stadion, Gottwaldov, Czechoslovakia	(Denmark) Anne Berglund	0–11, 4–11	Bronze

=== IBF International ===
Women's singles

Year	Tournament	Opponent	Score	Result
1969	Austrian International			(gold) Winner
1969	Slovenian International			(gold) Winner
1970	Slovenian International			(gold) Winner
1971	Slovenian International			(gold) Winner
1973	Slovenian International			(gold) Winner
1975	Slovenian International			(gold) Winner

Women's doubles

Year	Tournament	Partner	Opponent	Score	Result
1970	Slovenian International	(Socialist Federal Republic of Yugoslavia) Breda Križman			(gold) Winner
1971	Slovenian International	(Socialist Federal Republic of Yugoslavia) Breda Križman			(gold) Winner
1973	Slovenian International	(Socialist Federal Republic of Yugoslavia) Marta Amf			(gold) Winner
1974	Austrian International	(Socialist Federal Republic of Yugoslavia) Vita Bohinc	(Austria) Brigitte Reichmann (Austria) Elisabeth Schechtner		(gold) Winner
1974	Slovenian International	(Socialist Federal Republic of Yugoslavia) Marta Amf			(gold) Winner

Mixed doubles

Year	Tournament	Partner	Opponent	Score	Result
1969	Slovenian International	(Socialist Federal Republic of Yugoslavia) Slavko Županič			(gold) Winner
1974	Austrian International	(Socialist Federal Republic of Yugoslavia) Gregor Berden	(Austria) Hermann Fröhlich (Austria) Lore König		(silver) Runner-up
