= Andrej Pohar =

Slovenian badminton player

Personal information
- Born: 18 July 1974 (age 52) Ljubljana, SFR Yugoslavia
- Height: 1.78 m (5 ft 10 in)

Sport
- Country: Slovenia
- Sport: Badminton
- Handedness: Left
- Event: Doubles

Doubles
- BWF profile

Andrej Pohar (born 18 July 1974) is a Slovenian former badminton player from Olimpija club.

He was the coach on the 2000 Olympics expedition in Sydney, Australia. His sister Maja Pohar was also a professional badminton player, and the duo played in the mixed doubles event. Pohar won his first National championship in 1992 after five junior titles in Slovenia. He is the multiple National champion, having won National Championships for 33 times in 3 disciplines. Internationally, he was successful in Slovakia and Hungary, among others. He took part in the World Championships between 1995 and 2006 in various disciplines. He reached top 20 in IBF rankings in mixed doubles. At present, he is the member of Board of Directors in Badminton Europe.

== Achievements ==
=== IBF International ===
Men's singles
Year	Tournament	Opponent	Score	Result
1998	Slovenian International	(Belgium) Pedro Vanneste	12–15, 15–12, 15–9	(gold) Winner
2001	Slovenian International	(France) Nabil Lasmari	7–3, 2–7, 7–1, 3–7, 3–7	(silver) Runner-up

Men's doubles
Year	Tournament	Partner	Opponent	Score	Result
2003	Slovenian International	(Slovenia) Aleš Murn	(England) Nicholas Kidd (Russia) Nikolai Zuyev	2–15, 7–15	(silver) Runner-up

Mixed doubles
Year	Tournament	Partner	Opponent	Score	Result
1996	Slovak International	(Slovenia) Maja Pohar	(Denmark) Lars Paaske (Denmark) Sarah Jonsson	8–15, 18–16, 15–7	(gold) Winner
1996	Spanish International	(Slovenia) Maja Pohar	(France) Manuel Dubrulle (France) Sandrine Lefèvre	9–15, 12–15	(silver) Runner-up
1997	Slovak International	(Slovenia) Maja Pohar	(Denmark) Michael Lamp (Denmark) Rikke Broen	6–15, 2–15	(silver) Runner-up
1997	Hungarian International	(Slovenia) Maja Pohar	(Netherlands) Norbert van Barneveld (Netherlands) Lotte Jonathans	9–5, 4–9, 3–9, 5–9	(silver) Runner-up
1998	Slovenian International	(Slovenia) Maja Pohar	(Spain) José Antonio Crespo (Spain) Dolores Marco	15–2, 11–15, 15–8	(gold) Winner
1999	Austrian International	(Slovenia) Maja Pohar	(Scotland) Kenny Middlemiss (Scotland) Kirsteen McEwan	12–15, 11–15	(silver) Runner-up
1999	Romanian International	(Slovenia) Maja Pohar	(Russia) Alexandr Russkikh (Russia) Anastasia Russkikh	15–7, 15–3	(gold) Winner
1999	Slovenian International	(Slovenia) Maja Pohar	(Poland) Marcin Rynkiewicz (Poland) Angelika Węgrzyn	15–7, 15–3	(gold) Winner
2000	Strasbourg International	(Slovenia) Maja Pohar			(gold) Winner
2000	Peru International	(Slovenia) Maja Pohar	(Canada) Mike Beres (Canada) Kara Solmundson	1–15, 10–15	(silver) Runner-up
2000	La Chaux-de-Fonds International	(Slovenia) Maja Pohar	(Russia) Pavel Uvarov (Russia) Ella Karachkova	8–15, 5–15	(silver) Runner-up
2001	Spanish International	(Slovenia) Maja Pohar	(England) Peter Jeffrey (England) Suzanne Rayappan	13–15, 7–15	(silver) Runner-up
2001	Hungarian International	(Slovenia) Maja Pohar	(Sweden) Daniel Glaser (Sweden) Johanna Persson	7–5, 7–1, 7–1	(gold) Winner
2005	Croatian International	(Slovenia) Maja Pohar	(Singapore) Hendra Wijaya (Singapore) Frances Liu	11–15, 15–13, 7–15	(silver) Runner-up
