= Miha Šepec, Jr. =

Slovenian badminton player

Miha Šepec (born 14 January 1984) is a Slovenian badminton player. He won two doubles titles at national championships, together with Andrej Pohar (2005 and 2007). He has a doctorate in law and became a notable Solovenian lawyer (selected among the 10 most influential lawyers in Slovenia in 2018), as well as a lecturer at the Faculty of Law in Maribor. As of 2019 he coaches children and youth at BK Olimpija, Ljubljana.
