= Graeme Smith (badminton) =

Scottish international badminton player

Personal information
- Nationality: British (Scottish)
- Born: 20 December 1978

Sport
- Sport: Badminton
- Club: Glasgow
Medal record
Representing Scotland
Commonwealth Games
Bronze medal – third place	2002 Manchester	Mixed team
Scottish Nationals
Gold medal – first place	2002	doubles

Graeme Smith (born 20 December 1978) is a former international badminton player from Scotland who competed at the Commonwealth Games.

== Biography ==
Smith was based in Glasgow and represented Scotland at international level.

Smith made his international debut in 2000 and participated in his first major tournament at the Thomas Cup in February 2000. He specialised in men's doubles, partnering Russell Hogg and later Andrew Bowman.

Smith represented the Scottish team at the 2002 Commonwealth Games in Manchester, England, where he competed in the badminton events, winning a bronze medal as part of the mixed team.

He was the doubles champion, with Russell Hogg, at the 2002 Scottish National Badminton Championships.
