= Barnfield =

Barnfield may refer to:

- Barnfield (surname)
- Barnfield College, a college in Bedfordshire, England
- Barnfield Estate, a housing estate in southeast London, England
- Barnfield, Luton, a ward of Luton, Bedfordshire, England
- Barnfield, Exeter, a suburb of Exeter, England
- Barnfield (ward), an electoral ward of Hyndburn, Lancashire, England
- Barnfields (also Barnfield), an area in Leek, Staffordshire, England
- Barnfield Theatre, a theatre in Exeter, England
- Henry Barnfield Fund, a charity dedicated to finding a cure for pediatric brain cancer
