= Australian National Judo Championships =

Judo competition

The Australian National Judo Championships are the highest level of judo competition in Australia. The championships are held annually by Judo Australia, and qualified domestic and overseas judoka compete in their respective categories as representatives of their home states or countries. Both the women's and men's championships began in 1956, with the championships being held in Wollongong, New South Wales between 2012 and 2015.

At the 2011 event, Maria Pekli, a seven-time national championship winner, was awarded Lifetime Membership in Judo Australia.

== Weight classes ==
There have been a number of changes to the weight divisions over the life of the championships. There are currently 8 weight classes for each gender, based on the official International Judo Federation weight divisions.

Men
1956–1965	1966–1967	1968–1976	1977–1997	1998–present
Open category (no weight limits)
Heavyweight	Heavyweight	o93 kg	o95 kg	o100 kg
Heavyweight	Light heavyweight	u93 kg	u95 kg	u100 kg
Middleweight	Middleweight	u80 kg	u86 kg	u90 kg
Middleweight	Light middleweight	u70 kg	u78 kg	u81 kg
Lightweight	Lightweight	u63 kg	u71 kg	u73 kg
Lightweight	Lightweight	u63 kg	u65 kg	u66 kg
Lightweight	Lightweight	u63 kg	u60 kg	

Women
1956–1970	1971–1976	1977–1978	1979–1997	1998–present
Open category (no weight limits)	Open category (no weight limits)			
Open category (no weight limits)	o63 kg	o63 kg	o72 kg	o78 kg
Open category (no weight limits)	o63 kg	o63 kg	u72 kg	u78 kg
Open category (no weight limits)	u63 kg	u63 kg	u66 kg	u70 kg
Open category (no weight limits)	u63 kg	u63 kg	u61 kg	u63 kg
Open category (no weight limits)	u57 kg	u57 kg	u56 kg	u57 kg
Open category (no weight limits)	u57 kg	u57 kg	u52 kg	
Open category (no weight limits)	u57 kg	u50 kg	u48 kg	

== Australian Champions – Women ==
Women
Year	Open	State														
1956	C. Brown	VIC														
1957	M. Knyvett	NSW														
1958	M. Knyvett	NSW														
1959	M. Knyvett	NSW														
1960	M. Knyvett	VIC														
1961	C. Zavatchanos	NSW														
1962	M. Harding	NSW														
1963	Y. Morrow	NSW														
1964	No contest															
1965	J. Neilson	VIC														
1966	No contest															
1967	H. Goulter	QLD														
1968	A. McBean	NSW														
1969	J. Yarsley	VIC														
1970	C. Bullen	WA														
Year	Open	State	+63 kg	State	−63 kg	State	−57 kg	State								
1971	C. Bullen	WA	No contest		No contest		J. Yarsley	VIC								
1972	C. Bullen	WA	No contest		No contest		D. Moffitt	NSW								
1973	No contest		J. Lambert	VIC	C. Muller	NSW	J. Hansberry	SA								
1974	No contest		M. Shoveller	NSW	D. Svenson	NSW	J. Hansberry	SA								
1975	No contest		M. Shoveller	NSW	K. Lettau	NSW	S. Williams	NSW								
1976	No contest		M. Shoveller	NSW	K. Lettau	NSW	S. Williams	NSW								
Year	Open	State	+63 kg	State	−63 kg	State	−57 kg	State	−50 kg	State						
1977	No contest		J. Morrison	NSW	C. Boyd	NSW	S. Hendy	NSW	C. Hamblin	NSW						
1978	No contest		M. Richardson	NSW	C. Boyd	NSW	S. Hendy	NSW	C. Hamblin	NSW						
Year	Open	State	+72 kg	State	−72 kg	State	−66 kg	State	−61 kg	State	−56 kg	State	−52 kg	State	−48 kg	State
1979	No contest		R. Rapley	NSW	V. Burke	TAS	M. Longaroux	VIC	K. Sheehy	NSW	S. Hendy	NSW	C. Boyd	NSW	D. Smith	NSW
1980	No contest		G. Dekker	NSW	K. Daniels	NSW	S. McDonald	NSW	D. Potter	ACT	C. Hamblyn	NSW	S. Williams	NSW	N. Neale	NSW
1981	No contest		G. Dekker	NSW	W. Callender	NSW	S. McDonald	NSW	K. Sheehy	NSW	S. Williams	NSW	S. Moretti	NSW	C. Boyd	NSW
1982	No contest		Y. Zuydan	NT	G. Dekker	NSW	K. Daniels	NSW	S. Duncan	NSW	S. Williams	NSW	C. Boyd	NSW	J. Reardon	NSW
1983	No contest		Y. Zuydan	NT	G. Dekker	NSW	K. Daniels	NSW	W. Callender	NSW	S. Williams	NSW	C. Boyd	NSW	J. Reardon	NSW
1984	S. Williams	NSW	Y. Zuydan	NT	G. Dekker	NSW	K. Daniels	NSW	G. Booth	NSW	S. Williams	NSW	C. Boyd	NSW	J. Reardon	NSW
1985	G. VanDerLinde	NSW	Y. Zuydan	NT	G. VanDerLinde	NSW	K. Daniels	NSW	W. Callender	NSW	T. Johnston	ACT	C. Boyd	NSW	J. Reardon	NSW
1986	Y. Zuydan	NT	G. Dekker	NSW	G. VanDerLinde	NSW	K. Katz	NSW	H. Lewis	TAS	S. Williams	NSW	D. VanHoek	NSW	J. Reardon	NSW
1987	K. Katz	NSW	G. Dekker	NSW	W. Callender	NSW	K. Katz	NSW	A. Pepper	NSW	S. Williams	NSW	S. Hallett	NSW	J. Reardon	NSW
1988	G. Dekker	NSW	G. Dekker	NSW	W. Callender	NSW	K. Katz	NSW	L. Sheehy	NSW	S. Williams	NSW	C. Grainger	QLD	J. Reardon	NSW
1989	L. Sheehy	NSW	No contest		D. Fanuli	NSW	N. Hill	ACT	L. Sullivan	VIC	S. Williams	NSW	C. Grainger	QLD	J. Reardon	NSW
1990	S. Williams	NSW	G. Dekker	NSW	W. Callender	NSW	K. Katz	NSW	L. Sheehy	VIC	S. Williams	NSW	S. Hallett	NSW	J. Reardon	NSW
1991	N. Hill	ACT	H. Burnett	NSW	D. Fanuli	NSW	A. Pepper	NSW	L. Sheehy	NSW	A. Deacon	TAS	C. Grainger	QLD	J. Reardon	NSW
1992	L. Sheehy	NSW	H. Burnett	NSW	C. Pearce	SA	A. Pepper	NSW	L. Sheehy	NSW	A. Deacon	TAS	C. Grainger	QLD	J. Reardon	NSW
1993	L. Sheehy	NSW	H. Burnett	NSW	K. Katz	NSW	A. Pepper	NSW	L. Sheehy	NSW	N. Hill	ACT	S. Child	SA	T. Kirkman	NSW
1994	C. Dixon	NSW	H. Burnett	NSW	N. Galea	NSW	A. Pepper	NSW	L. Sullivan	VIC	C. Arlove	VIC	R. Sullivan	VIC	T. Kirkman	NSW
1995	C. Dixon	NSW	H. Burnett	NSW	N. Galea	NSW	C. Dixon	NSW	L. Sheehy	NSW	N. Hill	ACT	C. Brain	QLD	T. Kirkman	NSW
1996	C. Dixon	NSW	C. Curren	VIC	N. Galea	NSW	C. Arlove	VIC	L. Sullivan	VIC	N. Hill	ACT	C. Brain	QLD	T. Kirkman	NSW
1997	C. Dixon	NSW	C. Curren	VIC	N. Galea	NSW	C. Dixon	NSW	L. Sullivan	VIC	M. Pekli	VIC	R. Sullivan	VIC	B. Shugg	SA
Year	Open	State	+78 kg	State	−78 kg	State	−70 kg	State	−63 kg	State	−57 kg	State	−52 kg	State	−48 kg	State
1998	C. Arlove	VIC	F. Albrew	NSW	N. Jenkinson	QLD	C. Arlove	VIC	C. Dixon	NSW	M. Pekli	VIC	R. Sullivan	VIC	T. Acciari	NSW
1999	C. Arlove	VIC	No contest		N. Jenkinson	QLD	N. Galea	NSW	L. Sullivan	VIC	M. Pekli	VIC	R. Sullivan	VIC	T. Acciari	NSW
2000	C. Arlove	VIC	No contest		N. Jenkinson	QLD	C. Arlove	VIC	J. Raguz	NSW	M. Pekli	VIC	C. Lewis	VIC	S. Milligan	NSW
2001	No contest		No contest		D. Hill	ACT	C. Arlove	VIC	C. Dixon	ACT	M. Pekli	VIC	A. Raguz	NSW	S. Milligan	ACT
2002	B. Giudice	NSW	T. Jansen	TAS	L. Laveti	NSW	C. Arlove	VIC	C. Dixon	ACT	M. Pekli	VIC	S. Chervonski	NSW	J. Serrano	NSW
2003	C. Barrington	VIC	J. Malone	NSW	L. Laveti	NSW	S. Topp	NSW	B. Giudice	NSW	M. Pekli	VIC	E. Bensted	VIC	J. Serrano	NSW
2004	No contest		J. Malone	NSW	L. Laveti	NSW	C. Arlove	VIC	Y. Mitchell	NT	S. Taylor	VIC	K. Fong	NT	S. Chervonski	NSW
2005	L. Laveti	NSW	J. Malone	NSW	S. Grant	TAS	J. Shepherd	NSW	Y. Mitchell	NT	C. Lewis	VIC	K.Muramatsu	VIC	No contest	
2006	D. Newham	NSW	S. Dahl	QLD	S. Grant	TAS	J. Shepherd	NSW	A. Newham	NSW	C. Lewis	VIC	K.Muramatsu	VIC	No contest	
2007	C. Arscott	QLD	S. Dahl	QLD	C. Arscott	QLD	S. Taylor	NSW	K. Koenig	NSW	C. Lewis	VIC	K.Muramatsu	VIC	T. Day	QLD
2008	C. Arscott	QLD	J. Shepherd	NSW	S. Palumbo	VIC	C. Arscott	QLD	M. Corfios	QLD	E. Bensted	VIC	K.Muramatsu	VIC	H. Trotter	NSW
2009	S. Dahl	QLD	J. Shepherd	NSW	S. Grant	TAS	Z. Bourke	VIC	K. Koenig	NSW	M. Sakio	ACT	G. Chadwick	NSW	H. Trotter	NSW
2010	M. Sakio	ACT	J. Shepherd	NSW	I. Kopecny	NSW	T. Betts	NT	S. Collins	ACT	M. Sakio	ACT	S. Taylor	VIC	A. Coppleman	TAS
2011	No contest		No contest		I. Kopecny	NSW	C. Arscott	NSW	M. Sakio	ACT	C. Renzi	VIC	S. Taylor	VIC	A. Coppleman	TAS
2012	K. Beunard	NSW	M. Fisher	NT	No contest		S. Collins	ACT	K. Da Silva	NSW	C. Renzi	VIC	H. Trotter	VIC	C. Raynor	QLD
2013	C. Arscott	NSW	S. Grant	ACT	I. Kopecny	NSW	S. Collins	ACT	K. Da Silva	NSW	D. Manuel	WA	H. Trotter	VIC	C. Raynor	QLD
2014	S. Cadaddu	VIC	No contest		M. Wallis	VIC	A. Coughlan	VIC	T. Croton	QLD	E. Wright	QLD	H. Trotter	VIC	C. Raynor	QLD
2015	M. Wallis	VIC	No contest		I. Kopecny	NSW	S. Collins	ACT	T. Croton	QLD	D. Manuel	WA	Y. Hayashi	QLD	C. Hain	NSW
2016			O. Olalekan	VIC	No contest		A. Coughlan	VIC	M. Coughlan	VIC	M. Hamashima	QLD	Y. Hayashi	QLD	K. Mihalovits	NSW
2017			O. Usenko	QLD	N. De-Bruine	NSW	A. Coughlan	VIC	M. Coughlan	VIC	N. Wright	QLD	T. Easton	NSW	C. Hain	NSW
2018			E. Usenko	QLD	M. Wallis	NSW	A. Coughlan	VIC	K. Haecker	VIC	M. Hamashima	QLD	T. Easton	NSW	H. Shimazaki	TAS
2019					O. Usenko	QLD	A. Coughlan	VIC	M. Coughlan	VIC	T. Easton	NSW	R. Noda	NSW	K. Muramatsu	VIC
2020	No		Competition		Held											
2021			A. Paduch	NSW			M. Swan	WA	S. Middleton	WA	M. Hamashima	QLD	R. Titanti	NSW	S. Shu-Ching	QLD
2022			A. Georgia	WA			A. Coughlan	VIC	K. Haecker	QLD	C. Taylor	QLD	T. Easton	VIC	Y. Hayashi	QLD
2023			A. Belanger	QLD	M. Swan	WA	A. Coughlan	VIC	M. Coughlan	VIC	A. Flavia Ajuz Ferreira	QLD	A. Fielder	QLD	A. Do	NSW

== Australian Champions – Men ==
Men
Year	Open	State	Heavy	State	Middle	State	Light	State								
1956	G. Brown	VIC	E. Chambers	NSW	R. Cummins	NSW	G. Brown	VIC								
1957	K. Schaffner	NSW	V. Wilkie	QLD	K. Schaffner	NSW	G. Grennan	NSW								
1958	A. Wake	NSW	M. Pulford	VIC	B. Knyvett	NSW	D. Jones	NSW								
1959	A. Wake	NSW	A. Wake	NSW	P. Oost	WA	D. Seitel	VIC								
1960	P. Limbach	NSW	P. Oost	WA	No contest		No contest									
1961	P. Oost	WA	R. Trainor	QLD	F. Limbach	NSW	J. Seitel	VIC								
1962	Theodore Boronovskis	NSW	T. Koerner	SA	O. Sherrard	NSW	G.Pugol	VIC								
1963	Theodore Boronovskis	NSW	R. Ford	NSW	P. Page	NSW	B. Dalton	NSW								
1964	No contest		Theodore Boronovskis	NSW	P. Page	NSW	B. Dalton	NSW								
1965	Theodore Boronovskis	NSW	R. McMahon	VIC	W. Tracey	NSW	A. Infantino	VIC								
Year	Open	State	Heavy	State	Lt Heavy	State	Middle	State	Lt Middle	State	Light	State				
1966	Theodore Boronovskis	NSW	Theodore Boronovskis	NSW	J. Buckley	NSW	A. Byjkerk	NSW	J. Whipp	NSW	J. Black	NSW				
1967	P. Oost	WA	R. Leitel	VIC	J. Buckley	NSW	A. Byjkerk	NSW	R. Ford	NSW	B. Dalton	NSW				
Year	Open	State	+93 kg	State	−93 kg	State	−80 kg	State	−70 kg	State	−63 kg	State				
1968	R. Ford	NSW	B. Johnson	NSW	J. Buckley	NSW	W. Broadhead	NSW	R. Ford	NSW	D. Givney	NSW				
1969	L. Scholer	NSW	L. Scholer	NSW	B. Johnson	NSW	R. Turner	VIC	H. Willans	SA	D. Givney	NSW				
1970	W. Broadhead	NSW	L. Edwards	VIC	A. Buchanan	NSW	W. Broadhead	NSW	D. Churchill	NSW	R. Moffitt	NSW				
1971	W. Broadhead	NSW	B. Johnson	NSW	A. Byjkerk	NSW	R. Turner	VIC	W. Richards	NSW	D. Givney	NSW				
1972	B. Johnson	NSW	W. Partington	NSW	G. Ward	NSW	A. Byjkerk	NSW	D. Churchill	NSW	R. Moffitt	NSW				
1973	B. Johnson	NSW	W. Partington	NSW	G. Ward	NSW	A. Byjkerk	NSW	D. Churchill	NSW	R. Moffitt	NSW				
1974	J. Feeney	WA	G. Ward	NSW	A. Byjkerk	NSW	N. Dawson	NSW	L. Emmend	NSW	W. Richards	NSW				
1975	A. Byjkerk	NSW	L. Scholer	QLD	A. Byjkerk	NSW	W. Willanski	NSW	J. VanHoek	NSW	W. Richards	NSW				
1976	B. Johnson	NSW	J. Kopp	QLD	B. Johnson	NSW	P. Bugany	NSW	J. VanHoek	NSW	W. Richards	NSW				
Year	Open	State	+95 kg	State	−95 kg	State	−86 kg	State	−78 kg	State	−71 kg	State	−65 kg	State	−60 kg	State
1977	B. Johnson	NSW	W. Broadhead	NSW	B. Johnson	NSW	M. Carew	NSW	P. Bugany	NSW	J. VanHoek	NSW	W.D. Morrison	NSW	W. Richards	NSW
1978	B. Rogers	SA	P. Phillips	NSW	B. Johnson	NSW	M. Carew	NSW	G. Manley	NSW	W.D. Morrison	NSW	W.D. Morrison	NSW	W. Richards	NSW
1979	M. Scully	NSW	T. Fricker	NSW	B. Johnson	NSW	M. Carew	NSW	A. Broadhead	NSW	W.D. Morrison	NSW	M Murphy	NSW	T. Bilney	VIC
1980	M. Scully	NSW	R. Borchert	QLD	P. Phillips	NSW	M. Carew	NSW	P. Bugany	NSW	W.D. Morrison	NSW	M. Young	VIC	W. Richards	NSW
1981	M. Carew	NSW	G. Pinchen	VIC	M. Carew	NSW	A. Richardson	NSW	J. Gollan	QLD	M. Young	VIC	T. Bilney	VIC	S. Smith	TAS
1982	M. Carew	NSW	G. Pinchen	VIC	M. Carew	NSW	A. Richardson	NSW	P. Chicco	NSW	J. VanHoek	NSW	M. Murphy	NSW	G. Chiampa	NSW
1983	A. Richardson	NSW	G. Pinchen	VIC	M. Carew	NSW	A. Richardson	NSW	P. Chicco	NSW	M. Young	VIC	W. Rosser	NSW	G. Chiampa	NSW
1984	M. Briers	TAS	R. Borchert	QLD	M. Carew	NSW	A. Richardson	NSW	L. Val	ACT	M. Young	VIC	W. Rosser	NSW	G. Chiampa	NSW
1985	A. Richardson	NSW	T. Yamada	QLD	D. Lampkin	TAS	A. Richardson	NSW	L. Val	ACT	S. Brain	QLD	W. Rosser	NSW	G. Chiampa	NSW
1986	L. Val	ACT	M. Scully	ACT	B. Levasseur	VIC	A. Richardson	NSW	P. Taylor	TAS	S. Brain	QLD	W. Rosser	NSW	G. Chiampa	NSW
1987	A. Richardson	NSW	R. Matthew	VIC	D. Lampkin	TAS	P. Gagliardi	NSW	L. Val	ACT	S. Brain	QLD	W. Rosser	NSW	G. Chiampa	NSW
1988	C. Bacon	TAS	P. Bugany	NSW	D. Lampkin	TAS	A. Richardson	NSW	C. Palmer	TAS	G. Szabo	VIC	W. Rosser	NSW	G. Chiampa	NSW
1989	C. Bacon	TAS	D. Pendlebury	VIC	D. Lampkin	TAS	C. Bacon	TAS	G. Kelly	NSW	J. Hallett	NSW	Dar Fagan	NSW	S. Viglione	NSW
1990	D. Lampkin	TAS	G. Pinchin	VIC	D. Lampkin	TAS	C. Bacon	TAS	B. Thomas	TAS	Dan Fagan	NSW	Dar Fagan	NSW	W. DaSilva	NSW
1991	C. Bacon	TAS	M. Szabo	WA	P. Gagliardi	VIC	C. Bacon	TAS	L. Val	ACT	G. Szabo	VIC	Dar Fagan	NSW	A. Vlahek	VIC
1992	C. Palmer	TAS	M. Szabo	WA	P. Gagliardi	VIC	C. Bacon	TAS	S. Hill	ACT	S. Stones	TAS	G. Chiampa	NSW	J. Gavin	QLD
1993	C. Bacon	TAS	M. Szabo	WA	C. Bacon	TAS	C. Palmer	TAS	G. Szabo	VIC	Dar Fagan	NSW	T. Hill	ACT	O. Cassas	VIC
1994	C. Palmer	TAS	M. Szabo	WA	S. Tame	TAS	R. Ivers	NSW	G. Szabo	VIC	R. Maurency	NSW	Dar Fagan	NSW	B. Power	ACT
1995	G. Kelly	NSW	L. Val	ACT	D. Rusitovic	NSW	D. Wilkinson	QLD	G. Szabo	VIC	Dan Fagan	NSW	T. Hill	ACT	C. Gibbons	NSW
1996	G. Kelly	NSW	R. Matthews	VIC	R. Ivers	NSW	G. Kelly	NSW	G. Szabo	VIC	Dan Fagan	NSW	T. Hill	ACT	C. Gibbons	NSW
1997	T. Morrison	NSW	R. Ball	ACT	M. Kelly	NSW	G. Kelly	NSW	D. Kelly	VIC	Dan Fagan	NSW	A. Collett	VIC	M. Klimiuk	NSW
Year	Open	State	+100 kg	State	−100 kg	State	−90 kg	State	−81 kg	State	−73 kg	State	−66 kg	State	−60 kg	State
1998	M. Calloway	ACT	M. Szabo	WA	S. Georgiardis	ACT	G. Kelly	NSW	S. Hill	ACT	T. Hill	ACT	A. Collett	VIC	M. Klimiuk	NSW
1999	M. Hill	ACT	R. Ball	ACT	D. Rusitovic	ACT	C. Palmer	TAS	D. Kelly	VIC	Dan Fagan	NSW	A. Collett	VIC	A. Da Silva	WA
2000	R. Ivers	NSW	C.J.Lee	SA	M. Celotti	VIC	S. Hill	ACT	D. Kelly	VIC	T. Hill	ACT	A. Collett	VIC	F. Serrano	VIC
2001	M. Kelly	NSW	D. Rusitovic	ACT	M. Celotti	VIC	S. Hill	ACT	M. Endicott-Davies	NSW	T. Hill	ACT	H. Young	NSW	F. Serrano	VIC
2002	T. Hill	ACT	D. Rusitovic	ACT	M. Kelly	NSW	S. Hill	ACT	D. Kelly	VIC	A. Collett	VIC	H. Young	NSW	F. Serrano	VIC
2003	S. Pepic	NSW	S. Pepic	NSW	M. Celotti	VIC	G. Kelly	VIC	D. Kelly	VIC	A. Collett	VIC	B. Pilley	VIC	S. Fernandis	ACT
2004	No contest		G. Brendecke	QLD	G. Kelly	VIC	Priscus Fogagnolo	TAS	M. Endicott-Davies	NSW	D. Iverson	VIC	H. Young	NSW	F. Serrano	VIC
2005	S. Pepic	NSW	S. Pepic	NSW	M. Kelly	NSW	M. Hill	ACT	T. Hammou	QLD	Dennis Iverson	VIC	H. Young	NSW	S. Giudice	NSW
2006	Priscus Fogagnolo	TAS	G. Brendecke	QLD	M. Kelly	NSW	M. Endicott-Davies	NSW	T. Hill	ACT	H. Young	NSW	J. Cook	NSW	S. Giudice	NSW
2007	G. Kelly	NSW	G. Kelly	NSW	M. Celotti	VIC	D. Kelly	VIC	T. Hill	ACT	A. Collett	VIC	Ivo dos Santos	VIC	Matt D'Aquino	ACT
2008	Priscus Fogagnolo	TAS	M. Kelly	NSW	M. Endicott-Davies	NSW	Priscus Fogagnolo	TAS	M. Anthony	VIC	Dennis Iverson	VIC	T. Malcolm	VIC	A. Koltai	NSW
2009	S. Pepic	NSW	S. Pepic	NSW	D. Kelly	VIC	P. Fogagnolo	TAS	K. Gion	QLD	Michael Scamardella	VIC	C. Burghart-swieser	SA	M. D'Aquino	ACT
2010	Priscus Fogagnolo	TAS	J. Andrewartha	SA	D. Kelly	VIC	M. Anthony	VIC	B. Iverson	VIC	D. Iverson	VIC	Ivo Dos Santos	VIC	A. Dickins	QLD
2011	No contest		G. Kelly	NSW	D. Didier	ACT	B. Kwon	NSW	B. Iverson	QLD	B. Donegan	VIC	S. Brown	SA	Arnie Dickins	QLD
2012	Priscus Fogagnolo	TAS	G. Kelly	NSW	M. Janata	NSW	M. Anthony	VIC	B. Iverson	QLD	Jake Bensted	VIC	Ivo Dos Santos	VIC	T. Pappas	VIC
2013	Priscus Fogagnolo	TAS	J. Andrewartha	VIC	Priscus Fogagnolo	TAS	M. Anthony	VIC	Eoin Coughlan	VIC	Arnie Dickins	QLD	Ivo Dos Santos	VIC	K. Da Silva	NSW
2014	S. Temesi	QLD	N. Berard	VIC	D. Didier	ACT	S. Temesi	QLD	Arnie Dickins	QLD	Jake Bensted	VIC	T. Yokoyama	NSW	K. Png	WA
2015	S. Temesi	QLD	N. Berard	VIC	D. Didier	ACT	S. Temesi	QLD	I. Pavlinic	NSW	Jake Bensted	VIC	T. Pappas	VIC	Josh Katz	NSW
2016			Elijah Schuurmans	TAS	N. Berard	VIC	S. Temesi	QLD	Won Gi Jang	VIC	Jake Bensted	VIC	Noam Tidhar	VIC	Kai Png	WA
2017			Liam Park	VIC	David Russell	QLD	S. Temesi	QLD	Eoin Coughlan	VIC	Calvin Knoester	WA	Kai Png	WA	Josh Katz	NSW
2018			Nicolas Berard	VIC	Kayhan Takagi	NSW	S. Temesi	QLD	Eoin Coughlan	VIC	Calvin Knoester	WA	Nathan Katz	NSW	Tom Pappas	VIC
2019			Nicolas Berard	VIC	David Groom	NSW	S. Temesi	QLD	Jordan Kouros	NSW	Sam King	QLD	Nathan Katz	NSW	Josh Katz	NSW
2020	No		Competition		Held											
2021			Sung Lee	NSW	David Groom	NSW	Diego Barreto	NSW	Rihari Iki	WA	Rhys Allan	NSW	Pedro Antun Neto	NSW	Ting-Wei Lin	NSW
2022			Liam Park	VIC	Kayhan Ozcicek-Takagi	NSW	Harrison Cassar	VIC	Sam King	Qld	Jake Bensted	VIC	Josh Katz	NSW	Jackson Hole	VIC
2023			Liam Park	VIC	Axel Nightingale	VIC	Kuraishi Akishige	WA	Rihari Iki	WA	Jake Bensted	VIC	Ryuta Abe	QLD	Pedro Antun	NSW

== Most championships ==
Women
Championships	Name
14	Sue Williams (aka Sue Hendy)
11	Julie Reardon
11	Kerrie Katz (aka Kerrie Daniels)
10	Cathy Arlove
10	Geraldine Dekker
9	Carly Dixon
9	Leanne Sheehy
8	Christine Boyd
7	Maria Pekli
6	Kathy Brain (aka Kathy Grainger)
6	Wendy Callender
6	Catherine Arscott
6	Jake Bensted
6	Carli Renzi (aka Carli Lewis)
7	Aoife Coughlan

Men
Championships	Name
13	Gavin Kelly
11	Barry Johnson
10	Andrew Richardson
10	Mark Carew
10	Priscus Fogagnolo
9	Chris Bacon
9	Daniel Kelly
9	Tom Hill
8	Alex Byjkerk
8	Gino Chiampa
8	S. Temesi
