= Matt Hill (disambiguation) =

Matt Hill (born 1968) is a Canadian voice actor.

Matt Hill may also refer to:

- Matt Hill (businessman) (born 1970), Australian CEO of Globe International and film producer and director
- Matt Hill (American football) (born 1978), American football player
- Matt Hill (Australian footballer) (born 2004), Australian rules footballer for Hawthorn
- Matt Hill (English footballer) (born 1981), English footballer
- Matt Hill (golfer) (born 1988), Canadian golfer
- Matt Hill (writer) (born 1984), British writer
- Matt Hill (musician) (born 1985), American blues musician
- Matt Hill (basketball), American basketball coach
- Matthew Hill (judoka) (born 1976), Australian judoka
- Matthew Hill (born 1978), American religious broadcaster and member of the Tennessee House of Representatives
- Matthew Davenport Hill (1792–1872), English lawyer and penologist
- Matthew W. Hill (1894–1989), American lawyer and judge
- Matt Hill (EastEnders), a fictional character in a UK soap opera EastEnders
- Matt Hill (race caller), Australian race caller and sports broadcaster
