= Lee Murray =

British bank robber and mixed martial artist (born 1977)

- Born: Lee Brahim Lamrani-Murray; 12 November 1977 (age 49); Plumstead, London, England
- Status: Incarcerated in Tiflet, Morocco
- Convictions: Armed robbery; Forgery; Forming a criminal gang; Impersonating a law enforcement officer; Kidnapping; Unlawful detention
- Penalty: 25 years in prison
- Martial arts career
- Other names: Lightning
- Height: 6 ft 0 in (1.83 m)
- Weight: 185 lb (84 kg; 13.2 st)
- Division: Middleweight
- Fighting out of: London, England
- Team: London Shootfighters
- Years active: 1999–2004

Mixed martial arts record
- Total: 12
- Wins: 8
- By knockout: 4
- By submission: 4
- Losses: 2
- By submission: 1
- By decision: 1
- Draws: 1
- No contests: 1

Other information
- Mixed martial arts record from Sherdog

Lee Brahim Lamrani-Murray (born 12 November 1977) is a British-Moroccan convicted bank robber and former mixed martial artist. During his MMA career from 1999 to 2004, he fought 12 times, including a victory in the Ultimate Fighting Championship at UFC 46. He organised the Securitas depot robbery in February 2006, where around £53 million in cash belonging to the Bank of England was stolen by Murray and his associates. It was the largest known cash robbery in the world during peacetime.

Following the robbery, Murray fled to Morocco, where he was arrested in June 2006. Although the United Kingdom had its extradition request denied, Murray was convicted in 2010 in a Moroccan court for his role in the robbery and sentenced to 10 years in prison; this was extended to 25 years after a failed appeal. As of 2026, Murray is incarcerated in Tiflet, Morocco. UFC president Dana White said in 2008 regarding Murray: "He's a scary son of a bitch, and I don't mean fighter-wise".

== Early life ==
Murray was born on 12 November 1977 in St Nicholas' Hospital, Plumstead. His mother, Barbara Murray, is a White Englishwoman from Bermondsey, South London. She worked as a hairdresser and later a telephonist. On a holiday to Gran Canaria she met Lee's father, Brahim Lamrani, a kitchen hand from Sidi Ifni, Morocco. Lee was initially raised by his mother while Brahim continued to live and work in the Canary Islands. Brahim later moved to England and married Barbara in 1984. Lee had one sibling, a sister named Rkia born in 1985.

The family lived at 11 Buttmarsh Close, Woolwich, and Murray attended Foxfield Primary School, where he met his future wife, Siobhan Rowlings, three years his junior. As a child, Murray engaged in fights with boys from neighbouring estates. He had a difficult relationship with his father, who was mocked on the streets for wearing a djellaba and was often drunk. Described as a "frightening, violent man", Brahim demanded respect and obedience from Lee. He was abusive and was cautioned once by police for mistreatment. Eventually, Lee began to fight back against his father. Their relationship grew so volatile that Brahim felt living together would result in a death so he moved out. Barbara was then left to raise Lee and Rkia largely on her own and moved into a council house in the Abbey Wood estate.

While attending Eaglesfield Boys School, Murray met Paul Allen, his eventual best friend. Murray was a sub-par student and failed to make the school's football team. Teachers found him unmanageable; he was expelled and enrolled at Woolwich Polytechnic School to complete the statutory years of school. By then, Murray was a member of a gang based on the Barnfield Estate, which engaged in theft and drug-dealing. He and his friends were allegedly in contact with Nigerian drug dealers who operated at Plumstead railway station; a turf war broke out that saw Murray and his friends win territory in the local drug trade.

With Allen as his right-hand man, Murray became notorious in southeast London. He employed a network of drug runners, including the Turkish-Cypriot Hussein Basar. One of Murray's friends from this time was a future mixed martial artist named Mark "The Beast" Epstein, who said that Murray "made a lot of money" by selling crack cocaine. Murray was adept at violence, typically to control territory and make sure customers pay, and said that "some people would probably say I was a bully, but a bully to me is someone that goes for easy targets and people who can't fight back. Me, I went for all targets." Murray became known for punching people almost at random in the street, as well as harassing a man who ran a local corner shop.

Murray received multiple custodial sentences during his youth, including a term at Feltham Young Offenders Institution for assault and thievery. Upon emerging from Feltham, Murray devoted energy to lifting weights and drinking weight-gain shakes to add bulk to his lanky, 6-foot (1.8 m) frame. Joining him was Allen, who by then was known as "The Enforcer". Murray and Allen began using anabolic steroids and spending the money they earned from selling drugs on luxury cars. The police stopped Murray regularly. As they suspected he was a drug dealer, they attempted to place an informer in his gang but could not gain enough evidence to prosecute Murray. He was contemptuous of the police, often intimidating them on the streets. According to author Howard Sounes, some officers at Plumstead Police Station perceived Murray to be "very dangerous".

Rowlings, Murray's girlfriend, gave birth to their first child, Lilly Jane, on 24 December 1998. Weeks later, Murray was caught up in a turf war with rival drug dealers that led to the arrest of Epstein and more than a dozen others, many of whom received prison sentences. Murray, however, got "clean away," with Epstein saying that "he was the only one that slipped through the net. I mean, lucky boy! But he's always been lucky ... I went to prison for three years." Murray married Rowlings on 24 November 2000, listing himself on their wedding certificate as a "professional fighter".

== Mixed martial arts career ==
=== Beginnings ===
Murray began mixed martial arts (MMA) training in 1999, when he joined London Shootfighters. The gym's co-owner Alexis Demetriades recalled that Murray looked demonic, with pointy eyes and a pointy head. Murray competed in his first MMA bout on 5 December 1999 at an event called "Millennium Brawl", which was held at Hemel Hempstead Pavilion. He knocked out his opponent Rob Hudson in the first round. Fight promoter Andy Jardine stated: "He was so quick they called him 'Lightning' Lee Murray."

Murray's successful debut led him to seriously pursue a career in MMA; alongside training at London Shootfighters in White City for wrestling, he joined Peacock's Gym in Canning Town to develop his boxing. Martin Bowers, who ran Peacock's with his brothers Tony and Paul, described Murray as "a very nice boy, conducted himself well." Bowers said that Murray reminded him of many other young men he had seen in his gym over the years who came from troubled backgrounds and were given structure by sport. While Murray was training at Peacock's Gym, the Bowers brothers were planning a series of robberies, the biggest being a scheme to raid a high-security warehouse at Gatwick Airport and steal £1 million in foreign currency. Scotland Yard found out about the planned heist and all three brothers were arrested; Murray was uninvolved in the plans.

Under the banner of "Ring of Truth" on 12 March 2000, Murray had his second professional fight. He defeated Mike Tomlinson via a kimura submission in the first round. Murray then travelled to the United States to train at the renowned Miletich Fighting Systems in Bettendorf, Iowa, which was run by former Ultimate Fighting Championship (UFC) welterweight champion Pat Miletich. Robbie Lawler, who sparred with Murray at Miletich Fighting Systems, said Murray had "world-class punching power". Murray's next two bouts took place on 17 June 2000 at Extreme Challenge 34, which was a four-man tournament in Wisconsin. His first opponent was Chris Albandia, who Murray thought was a kickboxer because he was wearing Muay Thai shorts. After Albandia surprised Murray by performing a single-leg takedown, Murray sprawled then applied an achilles lock, stating afterwards that "I think it must have snapped because there was a real loud crack". Murray won the fight by submission and advanced to the final round, where he faced Joe Doerksen, a Canadian submission specialist who held a black belt in Brazilian jiu-jitsu. Doerksen submitted Murray in the first round with an armbar. Out of budget, Murray subsequently returned to England.

=== Tito Ortiz brawl, road rage incident ===
Back in England, Murray continued to fight on the regional scene, including a draw against Chris Bacon in 2001. The following year, while outside a nightclub after the UFC 38 event in London in July 2002, Murray became involved in a street fight with then-UFC light heavyweight champion Tito Ortiz. Murray reportedly knocked Ortiz out with a five-punch combination then kicked him in the head when he was on the ground. This version of events was repeated in Matt Hughes' 2008 autobiography. Pat Miletich was on the scene and stated that he and Tony Fryklund subsequently intervened to stop Murray from stomping Ortiz's head on the ground. Ortiz denied he was knocked out, stating that he had instead slipped due to wearing dress shoes. Chuck Liddell, who also participated in the street fight, said Ortiz had been knocked down but was not knocked unconscious. The story of the street fight spread and made Murray well known in MMA circles. Two months later, Murray knocked out Pride FC veteran Amir Rahnavardi with a left-hook four seconds into the first round.

Murray defeated highly regarded Brazilian fighter Jose "Pele" Landi-Jons in July 2003 via second-round knockout. In his post-fight interview, he called for the UFC to sign him. Murray made little money through MMA, as the sport was still in a nascent phase. To supplement his legitimate income, he worked as a bouncer and in 2003 he started Top One Security, a firm which hired out bouncers to nightclubs. The venture was unsuccessful and he left the company within a year. Using proceeds from his drug dealing, Murray bought a semi-detached house in Sidcup for £285,000 in August 2003, as well as a Range Rover Vogue for £50,000. While driving in the Range Rover through Bexleyheath on 25 December 2003, Murray became involved in a road rage incident. He engaged in a fight with the occupants of another car; he knocked a 17-year-old boy unconscious and beat his 38-year-old father into a coma. The 38-year-old was later airlifted to hospital with a collapsed lung and a fractured skull. Murray said he acted in self-defence, but was charged with dangerous driving and causing grievous bodily harm. Murray had previously been arrested in connection with the 2003 murder of Sabina Rizvi, who was shot alongside her boyfriend Mark Williams, a convicted drug dealer. Paul Asbury was convicted of Rizvi's murder but refused to name two suspected accomplices, one of whom the police believed to be Murray.

=== UFC debut, visa issues, stabbing ===
In January 2004, Murray's wife Siobhan gave birth to their second child, a son named Lee. Later that month, Murray travelled to the United States to make his debut in the UFC. He faced Jorge Rivera at UFC 46, held on 31 January in Las Vegas, Nevada. Murray walked out to the octagon wearing an orange jumpsuit and a Hannibal Lecter-style mask. He was taken down by Rivera early in the first round but caught him in a triangle armbar, which forced Rivera to submit. Although he had won the fight, the UFC were displeased with Murray as he did not reveal that he was under active criminal investigation in the United Kingdom. Murray was scheduled to fight Curtis Stout at UFC 48 in June 2004, but he was unable to attain a visa to travel to the United States. It later emerged that the Metropolitan Police had shared intelligence with American authorities about Murray's criminal history.

As he was unable to travel to the United States, Murray agreed to compete in the London-based Cage Rage Championships. In his first fight with the promotion, Murray faced future UFC middleweight champion Anderson Silva at Cage Rage 8 on 11 September 2004. He went the distance against Silva and lost by unanimous decision. Two months later, Murray's trial began for the 2003 road rage incident, in which he pleaded not guilty. He was acquitted of dangerous driving and the jury was unable to reach a decision on the grievous bodily harm charge. A retrial was scheduled but the Crown Prosecution Service ultimately chose not to proceed and Murray was acquitted. Although he had fought Silva in Cage Rage, Murray was still signed to the UFC, who offered him a $78,000 contract. He planned to fight Patrick Côté at UFC 52 in April 2005, but again he was denied entry to the United States and he was unable to participate. Murray was instead poised to return to Cage Rage and fight Phil Baroni in December 2005.

On 28 September 2005, Murray was hospitalised after being stabbed in a brawl outside the Funky Buddha nightclub during the 21st birthday party of British glamour model Lauren Pope. He suffered a punctured lung and a severed artery. Murray underwent open-heart surgery and required 30 pints in blood transfusions, but survived. By December, he was back in the gym and resumed training, although he was not as fierce as before. Murray's friend Mehmet Kavez stated in 2009: "Being to death and back changes a man, you know?"

== Securitas depot robbery ==
On 21 February 2006, Colin Dixon, manager of a Securitas depot in Tonbridge, was kidnapped by a group of robbers and forced to participate in the Securitas depot robbery. Dixon's wife and child were also taken hostage. This was an example of a tiger kidnapping. In the early hours of 22 February, the robbers arrived at the depot; Dixon was transported in a car and was followed by a 7.5-tonne lorry. The robbers were armed and held the staff inside the depot at gunpoint while loading cash into the lorry. The gang stole £52,996,760 in banknotes; they left over £153 million behind due to insufficient space in the lorry. Murray was named as the "mastermind" of the robbery and identified as the individual who police had nicknamed "Stopwatch", as he carried a stopwatch during the heist and timed the actions of the other robbers. The gang conducted the robbery at the depot in under an hour. Judge David Penry-Davey later described the heist as "organised banditry for uniquely high stakes".

Murray had previously been cautioned by Kent Police in July 2005 for loitering in a car along with two unidentified men on a road which overlooked the depot. A week prior to the robbery, Murray crashed his yellow Ferrari 360 Modena on the New Kent Road then fled the scene. He was arrested by nearby police officers but was released. After the robbery, police re-examined the Ferrari which had been impounded and found two burner phones containing numbers and photographs of other gang members. On one of the phones, police discovered a recording in which Murray talked to one of the robbers, Lea Rusha, about how they would carry out the heist. Rusha was also a mixed martial artist and knew Murray through the sport.

== Arrest and imprisonment ==
Murray fled England following the robbery, leaving his wife and two children behind. He and Allen travelled to Dover then boarded a ferry to France. They subsequently went to Amsterdam before driving south into Spain, crossing the strait of Gibraltar by ferry and arriving in Morocco. Murray chose to stay in Morocco as he held Moroccan citizenship through his father and the country had no extradition treaty with the United Kingdom. He stayed in a villa in the capital city Rabat alongside Allen and was later joined by two other friends, Gary Armitage and Mustafa Basar. They spent extravagantly on clothes and jewellery, drove around in a Mercedes and frequently vacationed in Casablanca. Murray and Allen exchanged large amounts of money in a casino, which was a common money-laundering tactic. It was rare for single men to share a house so Moroccan locals suspected they might be homosexuals. Murray refurbished the villa, adding decorations such as a statue of himself and a mural depicting his victorious UFC debut.

By the time Murray arrived in Morocco in March 2006, multiple suspects in the Securitas depot robbery had been arrested and evidence had been discovered which made Murray a target of law enforcement. Kent Police and Scotland Yard contacted Moroccan authorities as part of the investigation and Murray was placed under 24-hour surveillance. He pretended that he had obtained his wealth due to his fighting career and became interested in property, particularly in the coastal neighbourhood of Harhoura in Temara. Murray and Allen rented a villa in the area, as a place to take women whom they met at nearby bars. They also employed a chauffeur, Adnane Ghannam, who they later accused of stealing some of their money. Ghannam was held prisoner and beaten, but he denied the theft. After being released, Ghannam reported Murray to the police for assault. This served as the basis for an international arrest warrant against Murray, which was granted on 2 June 2006 in Maidstone.

On 25 June 2006, Murray was at the Mega Mall in Rabat, alongside Allen, Armitage and Basar. Dozens of armed Moroccan police officers participated in the operation as the suspects were deemed dangerous. After a brief physical struggle, all four men were arrested. Murray was charged with resisting arrest, assault and drug possession, as the police later found cocaine in his residence when they conducted a raid. Murray was convicted in February 2007 and received an eight-month sentence as well as an order to pay 303,100 dirhams in compensation. Murray was re-arrested later in February after the UK filed an extradition request in connection to the Securitas depot robbery. Murray's lawyer Abdullah Benlemhidi said extraditing Murray would be illegal as he holds Moroccan citizenship. The Moroccan supreme court granted permission for the extradition in May 2007, pending appeal. The extradition request was overturned in June 2009 after Murray was determined to be entitled to Moroccan citizenship. The UK then lodged an appeal to the Moroccan government, which invoked a law that allows foreign prosecutors to try Moroccan citizens for foreign crimes if the trial is held on Moroccan soil. Also that month, Murray attempted to escape from custody but the plan was foiled when another prisoner discovered small saws in his cell and informed the prison guards.

In June 2010, Murray was found guilty in a Moroccan court for his role in the Securitas depot robbery and received a 10-year prison sentence. He was convicted of armed robbery, forming a criminal gang, kidnapping, impersonating a law enforcement officer, unlawful detention and forgery. Kent Police argued the sentence was too lenient and it was increased to 25 years in November 2010, after Murray's appeal was dismissed. In 2011, it was announced that Murray's assets in Morocco would be confiscated by police and proceeds would go to insurers. Murray stated in a 2018 interview with Bloody Elbow that he continued to train while in prison and still planned a UFC comeback, with the hope of securing a pardon from King Mohammed VI of Morocco. As of 2021, Murray was incarcerated in a maximum-security prison in Tiflet, northwest Morocco.

== In popular culture ==
Murray was chronicled by ESPN in an E:60 segment in August 2008. Also that month, Time Inc. announced that they planned to make a film about Murray and the Securitas depot robbery, based on an April 2008 Sports illustrated article called "Breaking the Bank". In addition to the robbery, the film was set to be a biopic on Murray, including his mixed martial arts career. Variety reported in 2009 that Darren Aronofsky would produce and direct the film. Aronofsky later dropped out of the project to focus instead on the film Noah. In 2012, Deadline Hollywood stated that Gareth Evans had replaced Aronofsky and XYZ Films was set to produce the film, which would be based on the Sports Illustrated article as well as Howard Sounes' 2009 book Heist: The True Story of the World's Biggest Cash Robbery. The film ultimately did not come to fruition.

In 2021, UFC Fight Pass released a 25-minute documentary, "Fightlore: Lee Murray's Crimes and Misadventures", which featured interviews with MMA fighter Pat Miletich and Murray's former boxing trainer Terry Coulter, where they shared their experiences with Murray. In 2023, Showtime aired a four-episode docuseries about Murray and the Securitas depot robbery, titled Catching Lightning.

== Mixed martial arts record ==
Professional record breakdown
12 matches	8 wins	2 losses
By knockout	4	0
By submission	4	1
By decision	0	1
Draws	1	
No contests	1	

Res.	Record	Opponent	Method	Event	Date	Round	Time	Location	Notes
Loss	8–2–1 (1)	Anderson Silva	Decision (unanimous)	Cage Rage 8	11 September 2004	3	5:00	London, England	For vacant Cage Rage Middleweight Championship.
Win	8–1–1 (1)	Jorge Rivera	Submission (triangle armbar)	UFC 46	31 January 2004	1	1:45	Las Vegas, Nevada	
Win	7–1–1 (1)	Jose Landi-Jons	KO (punches)	EF 1: Genesis	13 July 2003	2	0:32	London, England	
Win	6–1–1 (1)	Amir Rahnavardi	KO (punch)	Millennium Brawl 8	22 September 2002	1	0:04	High Wycombe, England	
Win	5–1–1 (1)	Kama Boumna	Submission (armbar)	Millenium Brawl 7	16 June 2002	1	0:20	High Wycombe, England	
Win	4–1–1 (1)	Gary Warren	KO (punch)	MB 3: Independence Day	1 July 2001	1	N/A	High Wycombe, England	
Draw	3–1–1 (1)	Chris Bacon	Draw	MB 2: Capital Punishment	11 March 2001	3	5:00	High Wycombe, England	
NC	3–1 (1)	Danny Rushton	No Contest	ROT 2: Ring of Truth 2	9 July 2000	1	4:00	England	Rushton collapses due to exhaustion.
Loss	3–1	Joe Doerksen	Submission (armbar)	EC 34: Extreme Challenge 34	17 June 2000	1	1:19	Hayward, Wisconsin, United States	
Win	3–0	Chris Albandia	Submission (ankle lock)	EC 34: Extreme Challenge 34	17 June 2000	1	2:23	Hayward, Wisconsin, United States	
Win	2–0	Mike Tomlinson	Submission (kimura)	ROT 1: Ring of Truth 1	12 March 2000	1	0:56	England	
Win	1–0	Rob Hudson	KO (punches)	MB 1: The Beginning	5 December 1999	1	0:20	England	
