= Kavita Channe =

American sports reporter

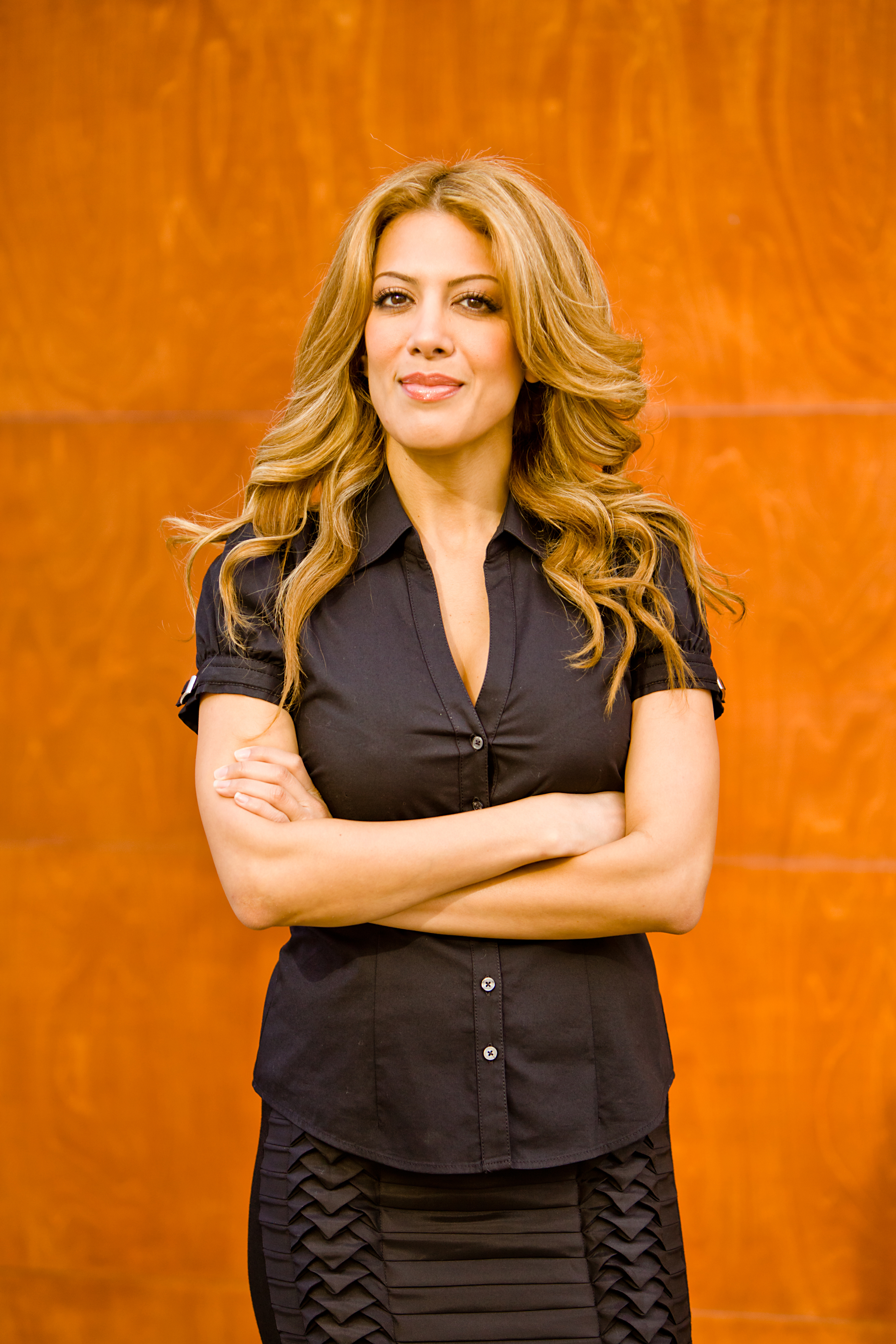
- Kavita Channe
- Born: Kavita Channe; London, England
- Education: University of Florida
- Occupations: Broadcaster, Correspondent
- Website: http://kavitachanne.com

Kavita Channe is an American television and radio personality, best known for appearing on Paradise Hotel.

== Early life ==
A London native with ancestry from India and Greece, Kavita Channe moved to South Florida at the age of 5 with her parents and 2 sisters. A graduate of the University of Florida, Channe received a Bachelor of Science in Journalism & Telecommunications with a specialty in Business. In 2006, Channe co-founded a celebrity-concierge and marketing firm, The Procurer.

== Career ==
In 2011 Channe became a team correspondent for the Fort Lauderdale Strikers and was also named the #2 "Sexiest Sports Moments of 2011". Channe also created her own show titled, 1stDown&Dirty, where she produces, writes, and directs, parodies and interviews with popular athletes including LeBron James and Dexter Pittman of the Miami Heat.

Channe was added to the Fox Sports Prep Zone lineup in 2012 as their sideline reporter covering sports in South Florida. Channe also became the host of the show VIP TV on The CW and Mundo Fox.

While continuing her roles on Prep Zone and VIP TV, Kavita Channe was added as Fox Sport’s Social Media Reporter during Florida Panthers (NHL) broadcasts in 2013.

Channe has appeared as herself on the Fox television show Paradise Hotel and has been a featured correspondent on Designing Spaces installments including Kid Spaces and Beauty Spaces, which air on TLC and WeTV. She was also featured in Broke: the New American Dream a film by Michael Covel, as well as a short film Checkpost by award-winning British film director Aneel Ahmad. In 2013, Kavita played herself as a reporter in the movie Exposure starring Corey Feldman as well as Exposure II to be released soon.

In 2014, KC was recruited by the Jacksonville Jaguars as their team sideline reporter where she reports on the world's largest video boards alongside former Jaguar, Fred Taylor, and fellow sportscaster, Christian Bruey. The Jaguars have a four-year contract to play in London, Channe’s birthplace, throughout 2016. Channe spent training camp, pre-season and the first month on the job in medical boot after breaking her fifth metatarsal in May 2014.

Kavita Channe also launched a bikini line that features sports themed bikinis www.DiDikini.com
