= VIP Television =

- Also known as: VIP TV
- Genre: Entertainment
- Presented by: Kavita Channe, Christine Curran, Natalia De La Cruz, Jayquan, Ana Maria Reyes, Jennifer Riley, Charelle Sno
- Country of origin: United States
- Original languages: English, Spanish
- No. of seasons: 8

Production
- Production locations: VIP Television Studios, 4028 NE 6th Ave, Fort Lauderdale, Florida
- Running time: 30 minutes

Original release
- Network: ABC
- Release: 2012 – present

Related
- Club TV

VIP Television (commonly shortened to VIP TV) is an entertainment news magazine program that covers red carpet events, charity events, sports, trends, and celebrities in South Florida.

The program airs on The CW (WTVX and WSFL-TV), Tuff TV, and MundoMax/WGEN-TV in the Miami-Fort Lauderdale, West Palm Beach-Ft. Pierce, and Key West television markets.

== History ==
A 22-minute pilot episode of VIP TV was broadcast nationwide on satellite television on October 29, 2010, and featured current hosts Jayquan and Ana Maria Reyes, as well as interviews with UFC fighter Spencer Fisher and Fat Joe. Unlike the present iteration of the show, the pilot was filmed in a North Beach studio and primarily focused on fashion and parties in Miami's South Beach neighborhood.

VIP TV first aired in its current 30-minute, commercial-less format on WPLG Channel 10, the Miami-Fort Lauderdale ABC affiliate, in 2012.

On August 15, 2015, the program held the first annual VIP TV Model Search to benefit No More Tears, a charity for victims of human trafficking and domestic violence. The event was hosted by actor Evan Golden and was judged by record producer Scott Storch, Miss Universe Canada Chanel Beckenlehner, and Ms. United States Celine Pelofi.

== On-air cast ==
- Kavita Channe – Host
- Christine Curran – Host
- Natalia De La Cruz – Host
- Jayquan – Host
- Jennifer Riley – Host
- Charelle Sno – Host
