= Arnie Dickins =

Australian Olympic judoka

Personal information
- Born: 6 September 1991 (age 34)
- Occupation: Judoka

Sport
- Sport: Judo
Medal record
Representing Australia
Men's Judo
Oceania Judo Championships
Gold medal – first place	2010 Oceania Judo Championship	-60kg
Gold medal – first place	2012 Oceania Judo Championship	-60kg
Gold medal – first place	2014 Oceania Judo Championship	-73kg
Silver medal – second place	2011 Oceanic Judo Championship	-60kg

Profile at external databases
- IJF: 1048
- JudoInside.com: 55832

Arnie Dickins (born 1991) is an Australian judoka who competes in the men's 60 kg category. At the 2012 Summer Olympics, he was narrowly defeated in the first round. He also lost in the preliminary round of the 2014 Commonwealth Games. He has been Australian Judo Champion on three occasions.

== Career ==
Born in the UK, Dickins moved to Australia when he was 14. He had already won two British Championships and three British School Championships. He won the senior Australian Championship in 2010 and the senior Oceania Championship in the same year. He won a silver medal in the Oceania Championships in 2011, then won it again in 2012 to qualify for the 2012 Olympics. At the 2012 Olympics, he lost in the first round to Betkili Shukvani.

In 2014, he won the Oceania Championship, this time in the under-73 kg division.
