= Priscus Fogagnolo =

Australian judoka, Brazilian Jiu Jitsu practitioner and mixed martial arts fighter

- Born: 17 April 1983 (age 43); Hobart, Tasmania
- Nationality: Australian
- Height: 5 ft 8 in (1.73 m)
- Weight: 186 lb (84 kg; 13.3 st)
- Division: Light Heavyweight (2005-2012); Middleweight (2016)
- Reach: 73.0 in (185 cm)
- Fighting out of: Hobart, Australia
- Team: Team Fogagnolo
- Years active: 2005-current

Mixed martial arts record
- Total: 12
- Wins: 11
- By knockout: 4
- By submission: 6
- By decision: 1
- Losses: 1
- By knockout: 1

Other information
- Website: https://www.facebook.com/priscusmma/
- Mixed martial arts record from Sherdog

Priscus Fogagnolo (born 17 April 1983) is an Australian mixed martial artist, multiple time National Judo Champion, multiple time Pan Pacific Brazilian Jiu Jitsu Champion and two time National Greco Roman Wrestling Champion. Priscus Fogagnolo represented Australia for Judo at the 2010 Judo World Championships

== Mixed martial arts career ==
Priscus Fogagnolo started his mixed martial artist career with Cage Fighting Championships in Australia in 2008 up until an injury in 2012 forced him out of the sport. His only loss during that time was to James Te Huna.

Fogagnolo returned to MMA in February 2016 where he was due to fight Jesse Taylor for Hex Fight Series in Melbourne, Australia, but the fight was cancelled due to Jesse having visa problems. Fogagnolo fought Daniel Way instead and was victorious by submission in round one.

In May 2016, Fogagnolo won the Valor Fight Middleweight Championship in Hobart, Tasmania.
