= Jake Andrewartha =

Australian Olympic judoka (born 1989)

Jake Andrewartha OLY
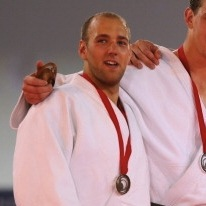
- Andrewartha in 2014

Personal information
- National team: Australia
- Born: 24 December 1989 (age 36) Clare, South Australia, Australia
- Height: 1.96 m (6 ft 5 in)
- Weight: 130 kg (287 lb)

Sport
- Sport: Judo
- Event: + 100 kg
- Club: Resilience Training Centre
Medal record
Gold medal – first place	2009 Samoa World Cup	+100 kg
Gold medal – first place	2010 National Championship	+100 kg
Gold medal – first place	2012 Welsh Open	+100 kg
Gold medal – first place	2013 National Championships	+100 kg
Gold medal – first place	2013 Oceania Championships	+100 kg
Gold medal – first place	2015 Oceania Championships	+100 kg
Silver medal – second place	2013 Oceania Open Samoa	+100 kg
Bronze medal – third place	2014 Commonwealth Games	+100 kg
Bronze medal – third place	2014 Oceania Open Wollongong	+100 kg
- Updated on 27 July 2017

Jake Andrewartha, OLY (born 24 December 1989 in Clare, Australia) is an Australian judoka. He competed at the 2012 London Olympics and the 2014 Commonwealth Games in the +100 kg event.

== Junior career ==
Jake Andrewartha started judo when he was 9 years old and made it into Australian team in 2004 at the age of 14. He would go on to compete at his first Junior World Championships in 2006, which would then led to his success in the senior division.

== Senior career ==
Andrewartha would eventually rise to the No.1 ranking in Australia by then end of 2008 at the age of 18, a position that he has held ever since. In 2009, Andrewartha became the youngest Australian to ever win an International Judo Federation World Cup, which was in Samoa.

After a number of consistent results, including a 9th place at the 2010 World Championships in Japan, Andrewartha ultimately qualified for the 2012 London Olympics. At the end of 2012, he became the first Australian to win the Welsh Open.

In 2013, Andrewartha completed another successful year which included 1st place at the Oceania Championships, National Championships, and 2nd place at the Oceania Open in Samoa.

Andrewartha placed 3rd at the 2014 Commonwealth Games in Glasgow.

== Professional wrestling career ==
In 2016, Andrewartha moved onto a career in professional wrestling, debuting with Melbourne City Wrestling.

In May 2023, Andrewartha won his first professional wrestling championship, capturing the Wrestlerock Heavyweight Championship in a 2 on 1 handicap match.
