= Matt D'Aquino =

Australian Olympic judoka

Personal information
- Full name: Matthew D'Aquino
- Nickname: Matt
- Nationality: Australia
- Born: 26 June 1985 (age 41) Canberra, Australia
- Occupation: Judoka
- Height: 1.64 m (5 ft 4 1/2 in)
- Weight: 62 kg (137 lb)
- Website: www.beyondgrappling.com

Sport
- Country: Australia
- Sport: Judo
- Rank: 5th dan black belt
- Event: 60 kg
- Club: Beyond Grappling Club
- Coached by: Thomas Hill
- Retired: 2012
- Now coaching: Beyond Grappling Club

Achievements and titles
- Olympic Games: No place
- Regional finals: 3 X Oceania Champion
- National finals: 2 X Australian Champion
- Highest world ranking: 19th in the World (2010)

Profile at external databases
- JudoInside.com: 18371

Matthew D'Aquino (born 26 June 1985 in Canberra) is an Australian judoka, who competed in the extra-lightweight category. He is a 5th Degree Judo Black belt, BJJ 1st black belt under Felipe Grez, two-time Australian judo champion, a multiple-time Oceanian champion for his respective division, and a former member of Marist Judo Club under his personal coach Tom Hill, who competed for the men's lightweight division at the 2000 Summer Olympics in Sydney, and eventually won the gold medal at the 2002 Commonwealth Games in Manchester, England.

D'Aquino represented Australia at the 2008 Summer Olympics in Beijing, where he competed for the men's extra-lightweight class (60 kg). He received a bye for the second preliminary round match, before losing out to Greece's Lavrentios Alexanidis, who successfully scored an ippon (full point) with an obi otoshi (belt drop), at ninety seconds.

Since then D'Aquino has gone on to be the first and only Australian male to win the Pac Rim Championships in its 40-year history, beating a highly ranked Japanese Judoka in the final. Recently D'Aquino has placed 17th at the World Championships in both 2009 and 2010 as well as placing 7th in the Miami and El Salvador World Cup as well as 7th place in the US Open.

After not qualifying for the 2012 London Olympic Games D'Aquino retired from the international Judo competition but still competes in national level Judo and Brazilian jiu-jitsu competitions. D'Aquino is also an author of two bestselling books on Amazon, these books are "Hard Fought Lessons by an Olympic Judoka" and "Effective goal setting so you can win in life." He also has a number of other books you can see below.

In October 2015 D'Aquino opened a Judo and Brazilian Jiu-jitsu dojo called Beyond Grappling Club. In 2019 Beyond Grappling Club was ranked the second largest Judo club in Australia by Judo Australia.

In January 2020 the International Judo Federation recognized Matt D'Aquino's YouTube channel "Beyond Grappling" as one of the top 12 YouTube channels in the world. In regards to Matt's channel, they wrote "Australian Olympian has an exhaustive collection of playlists specifically for judoka of different abilities and everyone can learn something from his well-known channel. D'Aquino has also authored books and released DVD’s and is a sought instructor around the world."

In March 2020, after his dojo was shut down for 6 months due to COVID19, Matt authored three more books including My First Judo Competition, My First Brazilian Jiujitsu Competition, and The History of Judo for Kids. Each of these books has been translated into many languages. See the bibliography below for more details.

In October 2022 Matt was awarded his first-degree Black belt in Brazilian jiujitsu by his Coach Felipe Grez. In December 2023 Matt was awarded his Godan (5th degree black belt in judo.)

== Bibliography ==
- Hard Fought Lessons: by an Olympic Judoka (2014) ISBN 978-1503151932
- Effective goal setting: so you can win at life Kindle Edition ASIN B00LXUJ05C
- My First Judo Competition (Australian edition) (2020) ISBN 978-0648965305
- My First Judo Competition (English edition) (2020) ISBN 979-8606278305
- My First Judo Competition (French edition) (2020) ISBN 979-8641157085
- My First Judo Competition (Spanish edition) (2020) ISBN 979-8646069673
- My First Judo Competition (German edition) (2020) ISBN 979-8647590848
- My First Judo Competition (Portuguese edition) (2020) ISBN 979-8646075902
- My First Brazilian Jiujitsu Competition (Australian edition) (2020) ISBN 978-0648965312
- My First Brazilian Jiujitsu Competition (English edition) (2020) ISBN 979-8627822587
- My First Brazilian Jiujitsu Competition (Italian edition) (2020) ISBN 979-8552384952
- History of Judo for Kids (Australian edition) (2020) ISBN 978-0648965329
- History of Judo for Kids (English edition) (2020) ISBN 979-8679358867
- History of Judo for Kids (Portuguese edition) (2020) ISBN 979-8553980597
- History of Judo for Kids (Spanish Edition) (2020) ISBN 979-8567197417
- History of Judo for Kids (French edition) (2020) ISBN 979-8552465514
- History of Judo for Kids (German edition) (2020) ISBN 979-8553988333
- History of Judo for Kids (Polish edition) (2021) ISBN 979-8584982515
- History of Judo for Kids (Dutch edition) (2021) ISBN 979-8548389473
- History of Judo for Kids (Italian edition) (2021) ISBN 979-8548343765
- History of Judo for Kids (Mpakwithi edition) (2021) ISBN 978-0648965343

Bilingual Books:

- History of Judo for Kids (English/Spanish edition) (2020) ISBN 979-8569225040
- History of Judo for Kids (English/French edition) (2020) ISBN 979-8569229598
- History of Judo for Kids (English/Portuguese edition) (2020) ISBN 979-8569235377
- History of Judo for Kids (English/German edition) (2020) ISBN 979-8568561071
- History of Judo for Kids (English/Polish edition) (2020) ISBN 979-8584984830
- History of Judo for Kids (English/Indonesian edition) (2020) ISBN 979-8583573035
- History of Judo for Kids (English/Mpakwithi edition) (2021) ISBN 979-8704959373
- History of Judo for Kids (English/Dutch edition) (2021) ISBN 979-8548373946
- History of Judo for Kids (English/Italian edition) (2021) ISBN 979-8548362469
- History of Judo for Kids (English/Irish edition) (2021) ISBN 979-8724595995
