= Julie Reardon =

Australian judoka (born 1958)

Personal information
- Full name: Julie Frances Reardon
- Nationality: Australian
- Born: 6 June 1958 (age 68)

Sport
- Sport: judo

Julie Frances Reardon (born 6 June 1958) is an Australian judoka.

She won bronze medals in the under-48kg ("extra-lightweight") category at the 1984 World Judo Championships in Vienna, the 1988 Summer Olympics held in Seoul (where women's judo was a demonstration sport), and the 1990 Commonwealth Games in Auckland. She placed 7th in the 1986 World Judo Championships in Maastricht and also competed in the 1991 World Judo Championships in Barcelona.

Reardon's sister, Suzanne Williams gained a gold medal in the under-56kg at the 1988 Olympics where Reardon gained bronze.

Reardon was the Australian national judo champion in the under-48kg class in eleven consecutive competitions, from 1982 to 1992.

As of December 2025 a list of "The Top Ranked Female Judo Athletes of All-Time" places Reardon at rank 365. She is listed on Judo Australia's Champions Award Honour Roll, showing her first senior national championship as 1972, and is a life member of Judo New South Wales.
