= Barnfield (surname) =

Barnfield is a surname. Notable people with the surname include:

- Graham Barnfield (born 1969), British academic and pundit
- Kacey Barnfield (born 1988), English actress
- Richard Barnfield (1574–1620), English poet
- Robert C. Barnfield (1856–1893), English painter
