= Chris Bacon (boxer) =

Australian Olympic judoka and boxer

Personal information
- Nationality: Australian
- Born: Christopher P. Bacon; 8 October 1969 (age 56) Tasmania, Australia
- Weight: Cruiserweight
- Judo career
- Weight class: ‍–‍86 kg

Judo achievements and titles
- Olympic Games: R16 (1992)
- World Champ.: 9th (1991)
- Commonwealth Games: (bronze) (1990)
Medal record
Men's judo
Representing Australia
Commonwealth Games
Bronze medal – third place	1990 Auckland	‍–‍86 kg
Oceania Junior Championships
Silver medal – second place	1985 Auckland	Open

Profile at external judo databases
- IJF: 53564
- JudoInside.com: 6198

Boxing career

Boxing record
- Total fights: 15 (+6 Unlicensed)
- Wins: 13 (+6 Unlicensed)
- Win by KO: 6 (+6 Unlicensed)
- Losses: 2

Christopher Gerald Bacon (born 8 October 1969) is a British retired professional cruiserweight boxer and judoka born in Tasmania, Australia and residing in Manchester. During his professional boxing career he was trained by Bob Shannon, a long-time Manchester boxing coach. He is a former WBF European Super Cruiserweight Champion, former National Judo Champion, and Bronze medal winner at the 1990 Commonwealth Games. Bacon is former MMA fighter and also participated in the 1992 Summer Olympics in Barcelona.

== Early career ==
Chris Bacon started Judo at age 8, eventually mastering the art and become the National Judo Men's Champion several times in different divisions, as well as participating in other Continental and International competitions. His top place was 8th in the 1991 World Judo Championships. He also represented Australia in Judo at the 1992 Olympic Games in Barcelona, where he finished 17th out of 33 participants in the middleweight division. Bacon won, on points, his first match of the games against Wagner Castrophil and then was eliminated by Hirotaka Okada, being pinned in under a minute.

Date	Result	Opponent	Event	Method
3 June 2005	Win	Alex Cook	Cage Fighting Championships 3	Unanimous Decision
3 November 2001	Draw	Lee Murray	Millennium Brawl 2: Capital Punishment	

== Unlicensed boxing ==
Chris Bacon has taken part in many unlicensed boxing events under the EBF (European Boxing Federation), his record stands at six fights all won by TKO dating from March 2008 – December 2011. Most notable was the EBF Heavyweight Title fight against 'notorious' Dominic Negus who appeared on 'Danny Dyer's Hardest Men'. This was the fight prior to David Haye's fight with John Ruiz at the MEN Arena in Manchester with Ricky Hatton, Matthew Hatton and Tyson Fury all witnessing Bacon claim 'Guv'nor' status of the UK.

Result	Record	Opponent	Type	Date	Location
Win	6–0–0	Mark Walker	TKO	11 December 2011	The Midland Hotel, Manchester, UK
Win	5–0–0	Dominic Negus	TKO	2 April 2010	The Ritz, Manchester, UK
Win	4–0–0	Harry Duiven Jnr	TKO	14 September 2009	The Ritz, Manchester, UK
Win	3–0–0	John Lewis	TKO	10 April 2009	The Ritz, Manchester, UK
Win	2–0–0	Vinny Lopez	TKO	20 December 2008	The Olympia, Liverpool, UK
Win	1–0–0	Davey Clarke	TKO	15 March 2008	Park Hall Hotel, Chorley, UK

== Professional boxing ==
Chris Bacon made his professional boxing debut on 21 December 1997 against Tim Brown winning on points in the cruiserweight division. Chris fought Tim Brown two months later again winning on points and then moved up to Heavyweight winning a consecutive 7 fights before losing to Kelly Oliver in Dublin 19 June 1999. Bacon then moved down to Cruiserweight for his following 2 fights which he won against Collice Mutizwa and lost to Garry Delaney at the Liverpool Olympia 14 July 2001. Bacon then moved back up to heavyweight to win against O'Neil Murray and then moved back down to Cruiserweight to celebrate his first boxing title The Central Area Cruiserweight Belt with a seventh round stoppage of Liverpool's Tony Moran at The George Carnell leisure centre, Manchester, 25 February 2007.

Result	Record	Opponent	Type	Date	Location
Win	13–2–0	Tony Moran	TKO	25 February 2007	George Carnall Leisure Centre, Davyhulme, Manchester, UK
Win	12–2–0	O'Neil Murray	TKO	12 November 2006	George Carnall Leisure Centre, Davyhulme, Manchester, UK
Loss	11–2–0	Garry Delaney	TKO	14 July 2001	Olympia, Liverpool, UK
Win	11–1–0	Collice Mutizwa	TKO	3 February 2001	Bowlers Arena, Trafford, UK
Win	10–1–0	Chris Woollas	PTS	9 October 1999	Bowlers Arena, Trafford, UK
Loss	9–1–0	Kelly Oliver	PTS	19 June 1999	Dublin, Ireland
Win	9–0–0	Israel Ajose	PTS	25 February 1999	Kentish Town, London, UK
Win	8–0–0	Paul Bonson	PTS	16 November 1998	Forte Post House, Glasgow, Scotland, UK
Win	7–0–0	Luke Simpkin	PTS	16 October 1998	Salford, UK
Win	6–0–0	Kevin Mitchell	TKO	18 September 1998	Manchester, UK
Win	5–0–0	Lee Swaby	PTS	17 July 1998	Golf and Country Club, Mere, UK
Win	4–0–0	Phil Day	TKO	30 May 1998	Whitchurch Leisure Centre, Bristol, UK
Win	3–0–0	Lee Swaby	TKO	8 May 1998	Bowlers Arena, Trafford, UK
Win	2–0–0	Tim Brown	PTS	23 February 1998	The Willows, Salford RLFC, UK
Win	1–0–0	Tim Brown	PTS	21 December 1997	The Willows, Salford, UK

Bacon retired from professional boxing in 2012 following an ongoing injury involving a damaged rotator cuff.

== Personal life ==
Chris Bacon runs a successful security firm in Manchester which is one of the reasons he has been absent from boxing over the years. In 2008 he and his promotions company KO Promotions planned to stage 'Britain's Toughest Bouncer' a reality TV show in Manchester although the City Council and Security Industry Authority condemned the idea. Bacon was the subject of a BBC Three Fresh documentary, Life through my Lens in March 2014 by Aneel Ahmad.
