= Judo Australia =

Judo in Australia

- Sport: Judo
- Jurisdiction: Australia
- Abbreviation: JA
- Founded: 1952
- Affiliation: IJF
- Regional affiliation: OJU
- Headquarters: Australian Institute of Sport, Australian Capital Territory
- CEO: Emma Taylor

Official website
- www.ausjudo.com.au
- (Australia)

Judo Australia (JA) is the National Sporting Organisation recognised by the Australian Sports Commission for the sport of Judo in Australia.

== History ==
Judo was first introduced to Australia in 1906. However, the first club for the sport wasn’t created until 22 years later when Brisbane Judo Club was found in 1928 by Kodokan dan grade Dr. A.J. Ross.

Since then, national organizations like Judo Australia (founded in 1952) have been in place to try to help promote and develop the sport as a full member sport of the Combat Institute of Australia (CombatAUS).

== Structure ==
The national body has eight state member associations:

- Judo NSW
- Judo Victoria
- Judo Queensland
- Judo SA
- Judo WA
- Judo Tasmania
- Judo NT
- Judo ACT

The main tournament they organise is the annual Australian National Judo Championships.

== See also ==
- Australian Paralympic Judo Team
- List of judo organizations
- Judo by country
