= Robert C. Barnfield =

English painter

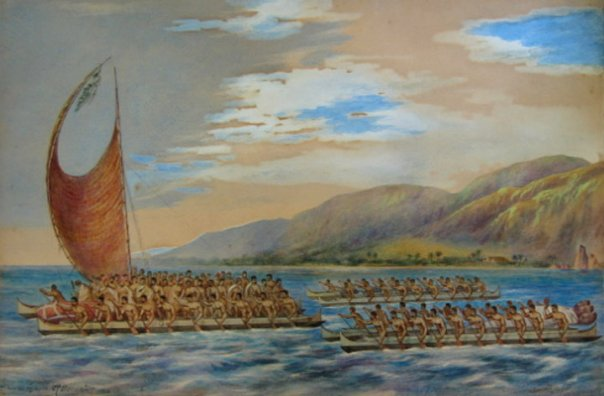
Three Double Hulled Canoes with Shoreline and Mountains in Background, 1886 watercolor by Robert C. Barnfield

Robert C. Barnfield (1856–1893) was an English painter who was born in Gloucester. He trained in London as an architect, but relocated to New Zealand in 1883 because of his asthma. In 1885, he arrived in Honolulu aboard the Explorer. He remained in Honolulu, where he painted and gave art lessons, until his death on 14 May 1893 at age 37.

The Bishop Museum (Honolulu), the Honolulu Museum of Art and ʻIolani Palace are among the public collections holding paintings by Robert C. Barnfield.
