= Hill family (Australia) =

Australian judo

The Hill family is a prominent family in Australian judo, having provided a number of National Judo Champions, competitors to the Olympic Games and Commonwealth Games, and Judo administrators.

== Colin Hill ==
Colin Hill (born 1941) was the President of the Judo Federation of Australia from 2010 to 2012, and Treasurer from 2006 to 2009. He is the father of Narelle, Steven, Jenny, Thomas, Matthew and Deborah. He has previously served as Manager of the Australian Judo Team at the 2000 Olympic Games in Sydney and the 2002 Commonwealth Games in Manchester. In 2015, he was awarded Life Membership of the JFA.

== Narelle Hill ==
Narelle Hill (born 1969) was a member of the Australian Judo Team at the 1996 Olympic Games in Atlanta. She won the bronze medal in the Women's -66 kg division at the 1990 Commonwealth Games in Auckland. She has been Australian Champion five times.

== Steven Hill ==
Steven Hill (born 1971) was a member of the Australian Judo Team at the 2002 Commonwealth Games in Manchester. He was a Coach in the Australian Judo Team at the 2000 Olympic Games in Sydney. He has been Australian Champion five times.

== Jenny Hill ==
Jenny Hill (born 1972) was a member of the Australian Judo Team at the 2000 Olympic Games in Sydney.

== Thomas Hill ==
Thomas Hill (born 1974) was a member of the Australian Judo Team at the 2000 Olympic Games in Sydney, and was a Coach in the Australian Judo Team at the 2012 Olympic Games in London. He won the gold medal in the Men's -73 kg division at the 2002 Commonwealth Games in Manchester. He has been Australian Champion nine times.

== Matthew Hill ==
Matthew Hill (born 1976) has been Australian Champion twice. He was also a member of the 1994 Australian Schoolboys rugby Team.

== Deborah Hill ==
Deborah Hill (born 1978) has been Australian Champion once.
