= Aneel Ahmad =

British film director

- Born: Longsight, Manchester, England
- Occupations: Film producer, film director, screenwriter, film editor
- Years active: 1996 – present

Aneel Ahmad is a British filmmaker, writer, film director, and producer

== Personal life ==
Ahmad was born and raised in a working-class family in Manchester.

With no formal training and no film education or qualifications, Ahmad started off making low budget HI8 films with his friends. In 2005, he gained recognition by directing his first short film on a tiny budget of £2,500, Waiting For Sunrise. In his early career, Ahmad gained experience by participating in many prestigious film writing courses; these included TAPS BAFTA, The First Film Foundation, Raindance Film Festival Script development, BBC's "Writers Room" new writers initiative, and The Writers Gym M.A Writers course (London Film School & French Institute). He was also part of other film courses such as NFTS Compass Point 2009/10, a mentoring programme for minorities run by Paul Moody (NFTS) and Marc Boothe, producer of Bullet Boy (B3Media) Some of the film mentors included Oscar BAFTA Winning directors Danny Boyle, Kevin Macdonald, Penny Woolcock, Asif Kapadia and artist Steve McQueen

His role models are Stanley Kubrick, David Lean, Satyajit Ray, Terrence Malick and documentary filmmaker Peter Watkins. He won the UNICEF award in 2005 for his short documentary Waiting For Sunrise, and also was shortlisted for a Grierson Award for Best Newcomer in 2006. In 2012, his short film Boy In Tree was long listed for a (BAFTA) British Academy of Film and Television Arts & in 2014, his short film Checkpost was long listed for a (BAFTA) British Academy of Film and Television Arts. In 2019 his short documentary Babli was a winning entry for the Super 8mm Straight 8 Cannes Film Festival.

== Path into the film industry ==
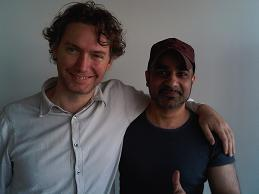
Director Kevin Macdonald & Aneel Ahmad Jerwood Space 2010

=== 1996 ===
Ahmad's first documentary was a 10-minute short, filmed in Manchester in 1996 and titled Movin as a Massive. The contributors H, Fitz, Fatty, Naveed were all school friends of Aneel Ahmad. This documentary was nominated by the Royal Television Society in 1996 for "Most Innovative Film/Video" and was one of the winners of the Lloyds Bank Film Challenge, organised with Channel 4.

=== 2001 ===
Asian Invasion is a 55-minute documentary that followed a group of Asian models and the organisers as they try to put on the GMEX Arena show with Bollywood stars and mainstream Bhangra groups which included DCS, B21, Bally Jagpal, and Jassi Sidhu

=== 2003 ===
In 2003 British film director Aneel Ahmad shot 2 short films connected with boxing, and one of the boxing sequence was filmed at the famous Salford Lads Club The club gained fame in 1986 when the alternative rock band The Smiths posed in front of the building for the inside cover of their album The Queen Is Dead.

A Man's World, an experimental film or avant garde, was shot late in 2003. The brutal world of boxing is not an obvious place to look in order to escape personal demons. But the bloody sport is a stark metaphor for the salvation of a disaffected woman from the outskirts of Manchester who finds solace inside the ring.

The entire production budget was £300 and was funded under the UKFC and Virgin Media shorts scheme.

Ahmad made his second short in 2003, a documentary titled The Day of the Fight. which was a behind the scenes documentary on Manchester's boxing gymnasiums. He followed many professional boxers which included world champion Ricky Hatton, Michael Gomez, and boxing trainers such as Billy Graham and Brian Hughes M.B.E.

== Shooting abroad ==
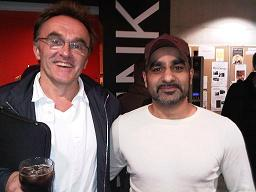
Director Danny Boyle & Aneel Ahmad NFTS, 2009

=== 2005 ===
Waiting for Sunrise was Ahmad's first international short documentary, funded by North West Vision Media and the UK Film Council film won the United Nations (UNICEF) UK Award at Sheffield in 2005. It was short listed for one of the film world's most distinguished awards—the Grierson Awards for documentary. Ahmad has also won critical acclaim and praise for his work from some of the biggest industry professionals such as Hollywood Feature film directors Ridley Scott (American Gangster), Sir Alan Parker (Evita), Mike Leigh (Vera Drake), Stewart Till Chairman of UIP, Quentin Tarantino (Pulp Fiction) Universal Pictures, Merchant Ivory Productions, Working Title Films, BBC, Fox, Film4, and many more leading industry figures.

=== 2007 ===
Boot Polish UK Film Council North West Vision Media

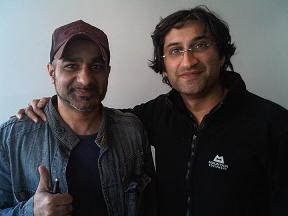
Director Asif Kapadia & Aneel Ahmad Jerwood Space 2010

A shoeshine boy on the dusty streets of Lahore dreams of rescuing a beautiful courtesan. Boot Polish is a film about dreams. Barbar and Lalita work side by side in the dusty streets of Lahore. Barbar is a shoeshine boy and Lalita a local courtesan, a girl prized for her beauty and grace. Barbar dreams of rescuing Lalita from the poverty that traps them both. One day, he's pushed to the edge.

Ahmad made his third short film with North West Vision as part of the new Lottery-funded UK Film Council Digital Shorts Scheme"Boot Polish". With a production budget of 18,000 pounds.

Boot Polish has been classed as one of the first British cross genre Bollywood films, similar to the feature film by Danny Boyle titled Slumdog Millionaire creating a mixture of reality & Bollywood.

The film was shot in Lahore, Pakistan in 2006 and was screened worldwide to a number of film festivals within 2007/09.

Boot Polish was co-produced with Ahmad by (BAFTA) British Academy of Film and Television Arts winning short Producer Kelly Broad.

In 2007, Aneel Ahmad & his film Boot Polish were shortlisted top 20 finalists, for one of the world's most prestigious Incircle Grant Schemes at the Abu Dhabi Middle East Film Festival

2007 Boot Polish won best cinematography award for the short film category at the (BET) Black Entertainment Television BFM Festival

2008 Boot Polish and Waiting For Sunrise were preserved for the nation by the British Film Institute for national archive.

2008 Boot Polish won best foreign film at the Route 66 film festival in the US. The festival has been credited as one of the 25 festivals worth the fee in MovieMaker Magazine. 2008 Boot Polish won a gold medal for excellence in music short film award 2008 5th Annual Park City Music Festival held in Park City and Salt Lake City, Utah US.

=== 2011 ===
Boy in the Tree is a short film about people's hopes, goals, dreams and desires and how people strive to achieve those desires under adverse circumstances. Give the world the best you have and you might get kicked in the teeth. Give the world the best you've got anyway

In 2012 Boy in the Tree was long listed for a (BAFTA) British Academy of Film and Television Arts For Best short film.

Boy in the Tree has been acquired for the nation by the British Film Institute for national archive 2012.

Boy in the Tree Won Best Short Film Accolade & Listed for the Annual Humanitarian Award 2012.

Boy in the Tree Won the RNC Special Jury Grand Prix Award in Rouen France 2012.

Boy in the Tree Won the Moustapha Akkad Award Special Jury Commendation in England 2013.

=== 2014 ===
Checkpost

Three lives that will never be the same again. Three lives wounded by one bullet. On a remote highway in Pakistan, the sandy roadside reverberates with the sound of a sudden gunshot. A lone film crew instinctively hits the ground. As they scramble to their feet, dusting off their western attire, they notice one member of their troupe remains on the roadside, holding his stomach. Elsewhere, Roshan Khan and his son Sheikhu make their way across Pakistan making a routine delivery. From the moment the golden shell tore into British documentary filmmaker Shahid Elahi, a chain of International events were initiated.

In 2014 Checkpost was long listed for a (BAFTA) British Academy of Film and Television Arts For Best short film.

Checkpost has been acquired for the nation by the British Film Institute for national archive 2014

Checkpost nominated for the Best Original Composition/ Short film Score Award at the Music + Sound Awards 2014

Chris Bacon (Man Of Steel)

A six-minute short documentary. Chris Bacon is an ex professional British cruiser-weight Boxer Judo/MMA fighter, born in Australia and now residing in Manchester, trained by Bob Shannon a long time Manchester boxing coach.

=== 2015 ===
Rickshaw Passenger (Raksha Sawari)

The Rickshaw Passenger a short film about Imtiaz a Rickshaw driver, who gives a ride to Tameena, a hotel call girl and begins waiting for her daily; he falls in love with her and is trying to rescue her from the horrors of poverty and prostitution.

Rickshaw Passenger Won Best International Short Indie-Fest Film Awards & Listed for the Annual Humanitarian Awards 2015

== Shooting England ==
=== 2017 ===
Emmott & Rowland

Emmott & Rowland were sweethearts and their story is a sad and romantic tragedy which has captured the imaginations of people who read about it. Set in Eyam Plague Village (England in 1665/66) A traditional tale of English romance, courtship in similarity to a Merchant Ivory Productions James Ivory Tom Hooper Joe Wright period film drama. The story is a fictional account based on the true events in Eyam 350 years ago.

Emmott & Rowland Semi Finalist for Best Short film CFFM 2017

Emmott & Rowland Indie Awards Winner Best International Short film Historical & Religious Award 2017

Emmott & Rowland Grace Day Winner Best actress in drama LA Actors Awards 2017

Emmott & Rowland Winner Best Historical short film CFFF 2017

Emmott & Rowland Winner Drama Honourable mention Los Angeles Film Awards 2017

Emmott & Rowland Bronze Winner Best Music & Nominated Best Short Film European Independent Film Awards 2017

Emmott & Rowland Winner Best inspirational short film at the New York Film Awards 2017

Emmott & Rowland Finalist US Hollywood Int'l Golden Film Awards & Int'l Film 2017

Emmott & Rowland Winner Global Shorts Awards Best Inspirational short 2017

Emmott & Rowland Winner Silver Best Musical Score LA short Awards 2017

Emmott & Rowland Winner Best Historical short at the New York Filmatic Awards 2017

Emmott & Rowland Winner Best Short film Atlanta Award-Qualifying Film Festival Awards 2018

Emmott & Rowland Semi Finalist European Cinematography Awards 2018

Emmott & Rowland Semi Finalist Los Angeles CineFest 2018

=== 2018 ===
Choice

Choice – On a cold, dark night, a woman is brutally attacked. She is now faced with a decision in order to escape her inner most personal demons. A choice that will not only effect her family. A choice that will impact them for the rest of their lives.

=== 2018 ===
The Day of the Fighter

The Day of the Fighter a short documentary drama on the day in the life of professional boxer Jack Massey. Filmed in Kodak Vision 3 Super 8mm Colour Negative Film 500T.

== Shooting abroad ==
=== 2019 ===
Babli

Babli is a short documentary, following the life of a middle aged man with schizophrenia and chronic depression. Filmed in Kodak Vision 3 Super 8mm Colour Negative Film 500T.

Babli Winner Straight8 Super 8mm Film Festival Cannes Film Festival 2019

Babli Finalist Best Short Documentary Rome Prisma Independent film awards 2019

Babli Winner Best Short Documentary for disability at the Impact Doc Awards 2019

Babli Semi Finalist Los Angeles CineFest 2019

=== 2019 ===
IQBAL

Iqbal is a short documentary/drama, based on interviews and eyewitness accounts, on the serial killer Javid Iqbal who murdered over 100 children in the early 1990s Lahore Pakistan.

Iqbal Semi Finalist Best Director Aphrodite Film Awards 2019

Iqbal Winner Best Foreign Language Short Film 2019 Cardiff International Film Festival

== Shooting England ==
=== 2020 ===
Dependence

Dependence is a 6-story complex interwoven drama filmed around the world.

== Shooting abroad ==
=== 2021 ===
Her My Voice

A short documentary/drama based in the little known world of a dancing woman. Set in the vibrant city of Lahore "Her My Voice" tells the emotional story of Komal. A deaf mute transsexual, as she reconnects with her father after he suddenly falls ill leading to a stroke.

== Filmography ==
Year	Title	Production	Notes
1996	Movin as a Massive (Filmed in the UK)	Documentary 10 minutes Channel 4 Lloyds Bank Film Challenge	Nominated for a RTS Award 1996 Winner Lloyds Bank Film Challenge 1996
2001	Asian Invasion (Filmed in the UK)	(Documentary 55 minutes)	
2003	A Mans World (Fiction)(Filmed in the UK)	(Includes – 30 minute behind the scenes documentary UKFC Virgin Media)	
2005	Waiting For Sunrise 6 minutes Documentary	(Includes – 30 minute behind the scenes documentary UKFC)(Filmed in Lahore Pakistan)	Shortlisted for A Grierson Award 2005, Winner UNICEF UK Award 2005
2007	Boot Polish (Fiction) 12 minutes	(Includes – 61 minute behind the scenes documentary UKFC)	Winner Best Cinematography (BFM 2007), Shortlisted Incircle Grant Scheme Abu Dhabi 2008, Winner Route 66 (Best Short Film 2008), Winner Gold Medal Music Award (Park City 2008)
2011	Boy In The Tree (Fiction)	(Filmed in Lahore Pakistan) 14 minutes	Long listed for a British Academy of Film and Television Arts Award for Best short film (BAFTA 2012), Winner Best Short film Accolade Humanitarian Award 2012, Winner RNC Special Jury Grand Prix Award Rouen France 2012, Winner Special Commendation for The Moustapha Akkad Award England 2013
2014	Checkpost (Fiction)	(UK/USA/PAKISTAN) 12 minutes	Long listed for a British Academy of Film and Television Arts Award for Best short film (BAFTA 2014) Nominated for the Best Original Composition/ Short film Score Award at the Music + Sound Awards 2014
2014	Chris Bacon Man Of Steel Documentary	(Filmed in the UK) 5 minutes	BBC Three Fresh online short documentary
2015	Raksha Sawari Rickshaw Passenger	(Filmed in Pakistan) 15 minutes Fiction	Winner Best Short film Indie-Fest Humanitarian Award 2015,
2017	Emmott & Rowland	(Filmed in the UK Fiction) 15 minutes Fiction	Semi Finalist Best Short film CFFM 2017, Winner Best short film Historical & Religious Indie Awards 2017, Grace Day Winner Best actress in drama LA Actors Awards (2017), Winner Best Historical short film CFFF 2017, Semi Finalist European Cinematography Awards 2018, Winner Drama Honourable mention Los Angeles Film Awards 2017, Semi Finalist Los Angeles CineFest 2018, Winner Bronze Best Music & Nominated Best Short Film European Independent Film Awards 2017, Winner Best inspirational short film New York Film Awards 2017, Finalist US Hollywood Int'l Golden Film Awards 2017, Winner Global Shorts Awards Best Inspirational short 2017, Winner Silver Best Musical Score LA short Awards 2017, Winner Best Historical short at the New York Filmatic Awards 2017, Winner Best Short film Atlanta Award-Qualifying Film Festival Awards 2018
2018	Choice	(Filmed in the UK Fiction) 3 minutes Fiction	
2018	The Day of the fighter	(Filmed in the UK) 3 minutes Doc/Drama	
2019	Babli	(Filmed in Pakistan) 3 minutes Documentary	Winner Straight8 Super 8mm Film Festival 2019 Cannes Film Festival, Finalist Best Short Documentary Rome Prisma Independent film awards 2019, Winner Best Short Documentary for Disability at the Impact Doc Awards 2019, Semi Finalist Los Angeles CineFest 2019
2019	IQBAL	(Filmed in Pakistan) 5 minutes Documentary	Semi Finalist Best Director Aphrodite Film Awards 2019, Winner Best Foreign Language Short Film 2019 Cardiff International Film Festival
2020	Dependence	(Filmed in Pakistan, UK, USA) 14 minutes fiction	
2021	Her My Voice	(Filmed in Pakistan] 7 minutes documentary, drama	
2022			
