= Australian Paralympic Judo Team =

Judo was first held at the 1988 Summer Paralympics. Vision impaired athlete Anthony Clarke represented Australia at five Games and has won Australia's only medal - a gold medal.

== Medal table ==
Games	Gold	Silver	Bronze	Total
1992 Barcelona	0	0	0	0
1996 Atlanta	1	0	0	1
2000 Sydney*	0	0	0	0
2004 Athens	0	0	0	0
2008 Beijing	0	0	0	0
2020 Tokyo	0	0	0	0
2024 Paris	0	0	0	0
Totals (7 entries)	1	0	0	1

== Summer Paralympic Games ==
=== 1992 Barcelona ===
See also: Judo at the 1992 Summer Paralympics

Australia represented by:
Men – Anthony Clarke
Officials – Bruce Tatam (Escort)

=== 1996 Atlanta ===
See also: Judo at the 1996 Summer Paralympics

Australia represented by:
Men – Anthony Clarke
Coach – Trevor Kschammer

Anthony Clarke is Australia's first ever competitor to medal in Judo and continued on to compete for another 12 years before retiring in 2008.

=== 2000 Sydney ===
See also: Judo at the 2000 Summer Paralympics

Australia represented by:
Men – Anthony Clarke
Coach – Trevor Kschammer

=== 2004 Athens ===
See also: Judo at the 2004 Summer Paralympics

Australia represented by:

Men – Anthony Clarke
Women - Desiree Allan
Head Coach – Trevor Kschammer, Assistant Coach - Lara Sullivan

=== 2008 Beijing ===
See also: Judo at the 2008 Summer Paralympics

Australia represented by:
Men – Anthony Clarke
Coach - Neil Ballard

=== 2020 Tokyo ===
See also: Judo at the 2020 Summer Paralympics

Australia represented by:
Men- Wayne Phipps

Officials - Team Manager - Calvin Knoester

=== 2024 Paris ===
See also: Judo at the 2024 Summer Paralympics

Australia represented by:
Women - Taylor Gosens
Officials - Team Manager/Head Coach Elliot Stewart
