= Barnfield (ward) =

- Shown within Hyndburn
- Area: 4.20 km^{2} (1.62 sq mi)
- Population: 4,424 (2011)
  - Density: 1,053/km^{2} (2,730/sq mi)
- District: Hyndburn
- Ceremonial county: Lancashire
- Region: North West
- Country: England
- Sovereign state: United Kingdom
- UK Parliament: Hyndburn
- Councillors: Tony Dobson (Conservative); June Harrison (Labour)

Barnfield is one of the 18 electoral wards that form the Parliamentary constituency of Hyndburn, Lancashire, England. The ward returns two councillors to represent the area between Accrington town centre and the Hyndburn district border on the Hyndburn Borough Council. As of the May 2019 Council election, Barnfield had an electorate of 3,416.
