= Dennis Iverson =

Australian Olympic judoka

Personal information
- Nationality: Australia
- Born: 17 January 1981 (age 45) Darwin, Northern Territory, Australia
- Height: 1.77 m (5 ft 9 1/2 in)
- Weight: 73 kg (161 lb)

Sport
- Sport: Judo
- Event: 73 kg
- Club: Victorian Judo Academy

Dennis Iverson (born 17 January 1981 in Darwin, Northern Territory) is an Australian judoka, who played for the lightweight category. Started out his sporting career at age twelve, Iverson had earned a total of four titles in the same weight division (2004, 2005, 2008 and 2010) at the Australian Judo Championships.

Iverson represented Australia at the 2008 Summer Olympics in Beijing, where he competed for the men's lightweight class (73 kg). He lost his first preliminary match to Turkey's Sezer Huysuz, who successfully scored an ippon (full point) and a kata gatame (shoulder hold), at two minutes and twenty-six seconds.
