= Barnfields =

Suburb of Leek in Staffordshire, England

Coordinates: 53.098514°N 2.030117°W

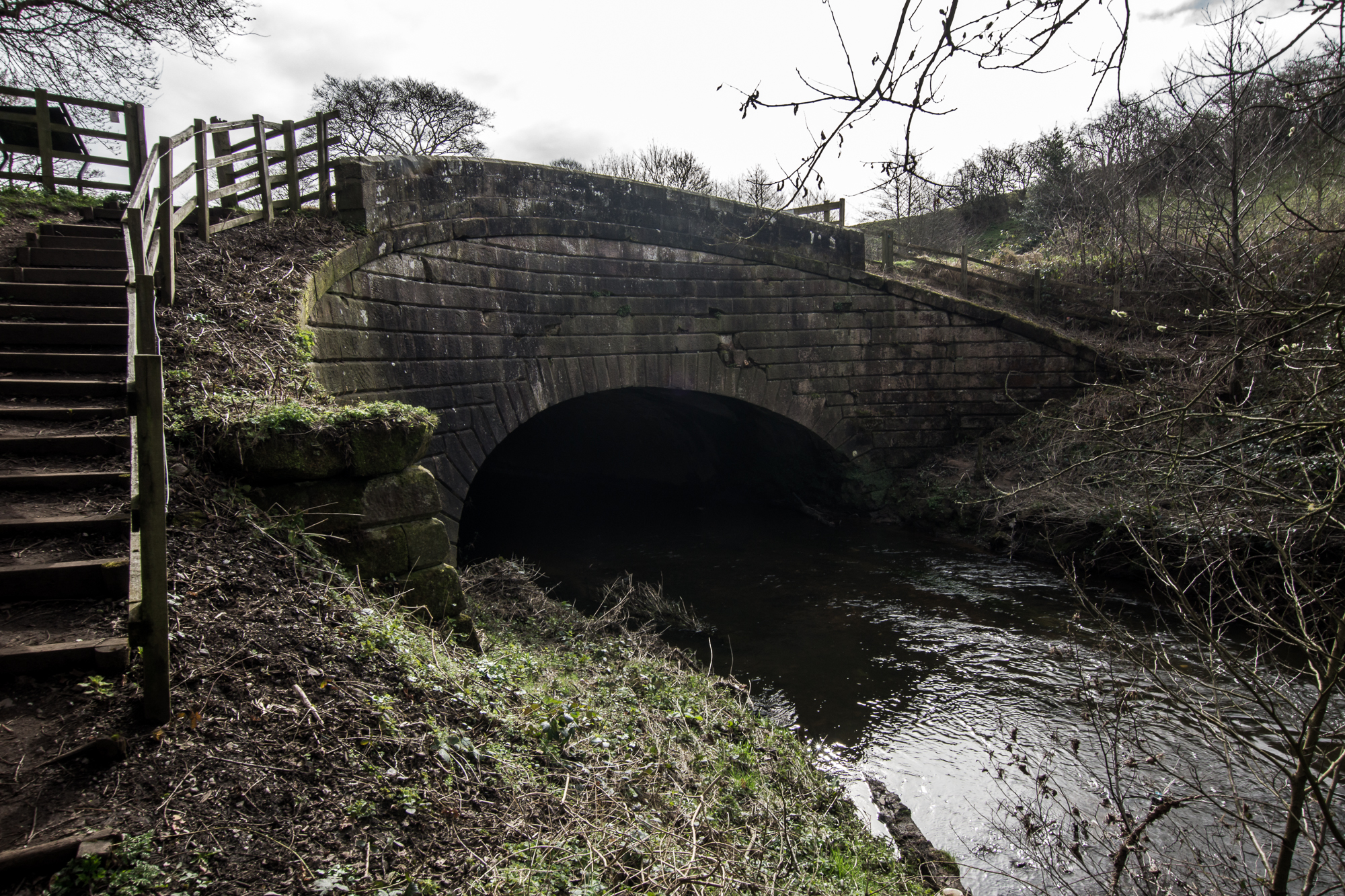
- The Barnfields Aqueduct in Barnfields, Leek

- Location within Staffordshire
- OS grid reference: SJ980557
- Civil parish: Leek
- District: Staffordshire Moorlands
- Shire county: Staffordshire
- Region: West Midlands
- Country: England
- Sovereign state: United Kingdom
- Post town: Leek
- Postcode district: ST13
- Police: Staffordshire
- Fire: Staffordshire
- Ambulance: West Midlands
- UK Parliament: Staffordshire Moorlands

Barnfields is a suburb of Leek in the Staffordshire Moorlands district of the county of Staffordshire, England.

== Transport ==
There are regular buses that connect the area to Leek as well as further afield to places such as Ashbourne, Buxton, Cheddleton, Hanley, Macclesfield and Waterhouses.

== Amenities ==
The area is predominantly industrial and retail, with some housing estates.

== Caldon Canal ==
The Caldon Canal passes through the area at Barnfields Aqueduct, which is a Grade II listed structure.
