= Cathy Grainger-Brain =

Australian judoka

Personal information
- Nationality: Australian
- Born: 20 September 1967 (age 59) Canberra, Australia

Sport
- Sport: Judo
Medal record
Judo
Representing Australia
Commonwealth Games
| Bronze medal – third place | 1990 Auckland | Women's Half Lightweight |

Catherine Anne Grainger-Brain (born 20 September 1967) is an Australian former judoka. She competed at the 1992 Summer Olympics and the 1996 Summer Olympics.
