= Barnfield Estate =

Housing estate in Woolwich, London

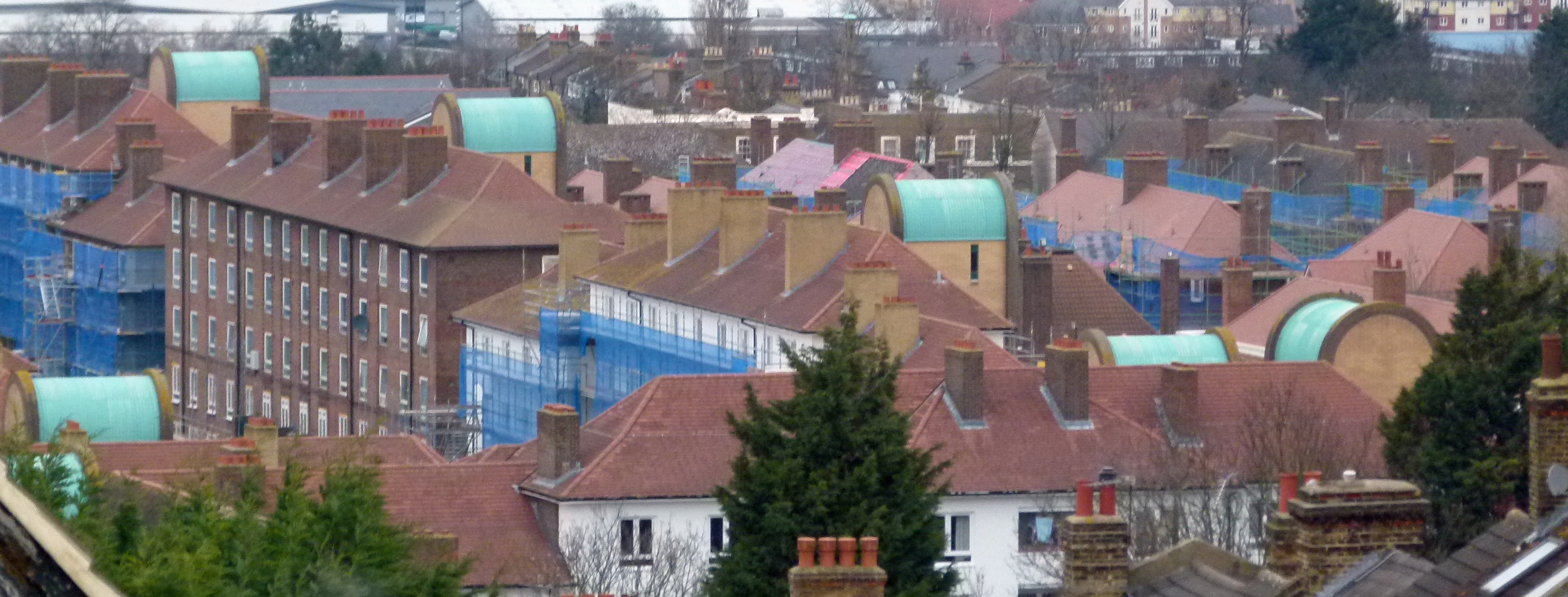
- View of the Barnfield Estate from Shooter's Hill
- Interactive map of Barnfield Estate

General information
- Location: Woolwich, Greenwich, London, England
- Coordinates: 51°28′54.68″N 0°4′16.08″E
- Status: Ongoing regeneration

Construction
- Constructed: 1930s(?)

Other information
- Governing body: Royal Borough of Greenwich

The Barnfield Estate is a housing estate located in Woolwich, Royal Borough of Greenwich, south east London.

== Location ==
The Barnfield Estate is located on the northern slope of Shooter's Hill, about one third up the hill from Woolwich Arsenal station (to the north). The area lies between Plumstead Common Road, Herbert Road, Eglinton Hill, Genesta Road and Wrottesley Road. To the west is Woolwich Common, to the east Plumstead Common.

== Construction and design ==
Building of the estate was approved by the Metropolitan Borough of Woolwich to ease with the growing population in London in the interwar period. The site currently contains 570 homes. There are both town houses and 30 tower blocks on the estate. There are a number of three storey red brick town houses in and around the area of Barnfield Road and Barnfield Gardens, as well as two-storey town houses of varying colours; white, green and pink. There is a number of four and five-storey tower blocks on Mayplace Lane in red brick: Acworth House, Alford House, Maxwell House, Squires House and Turton House. An open space is located at either end of Barnfield Road to encourage a community feeling. The coloured buildings are similar to those built on the Thamesmead estate.

== Population ==
The Barnfield Estate is a densely populated and highly multicultural area. In the census 2011, 42.8% of all residents stated they were 'black', 16.3% were listed as 'white', and 45.5% as other (Asian or mixed race). 30.2% of residents were born outside of the UK, according to the census 2011, many originating from Eastern Europe or Somalia.

== Crime and deprivation ==
The Barnfield Estate has a history of criminal activity, which has led to the recent regeneration of the estate by the Royal Borough of Greenwich. In 2010, the area was identified in the Index of Multiple Deprivation as being in the top 5% of London Local Super Output areas. In 2008, a 20-year-old man was shot on Barnfield Road in a stand-off with two other men. In August 2015, a 24-year-old man was stabbed to death near Turton House, while eight other men were seen running from the scene. No arrests were made. In October 2015, another stabbing occurred, this time to a 20-year-old man who was stabbed in the back.

== Regeneration ==
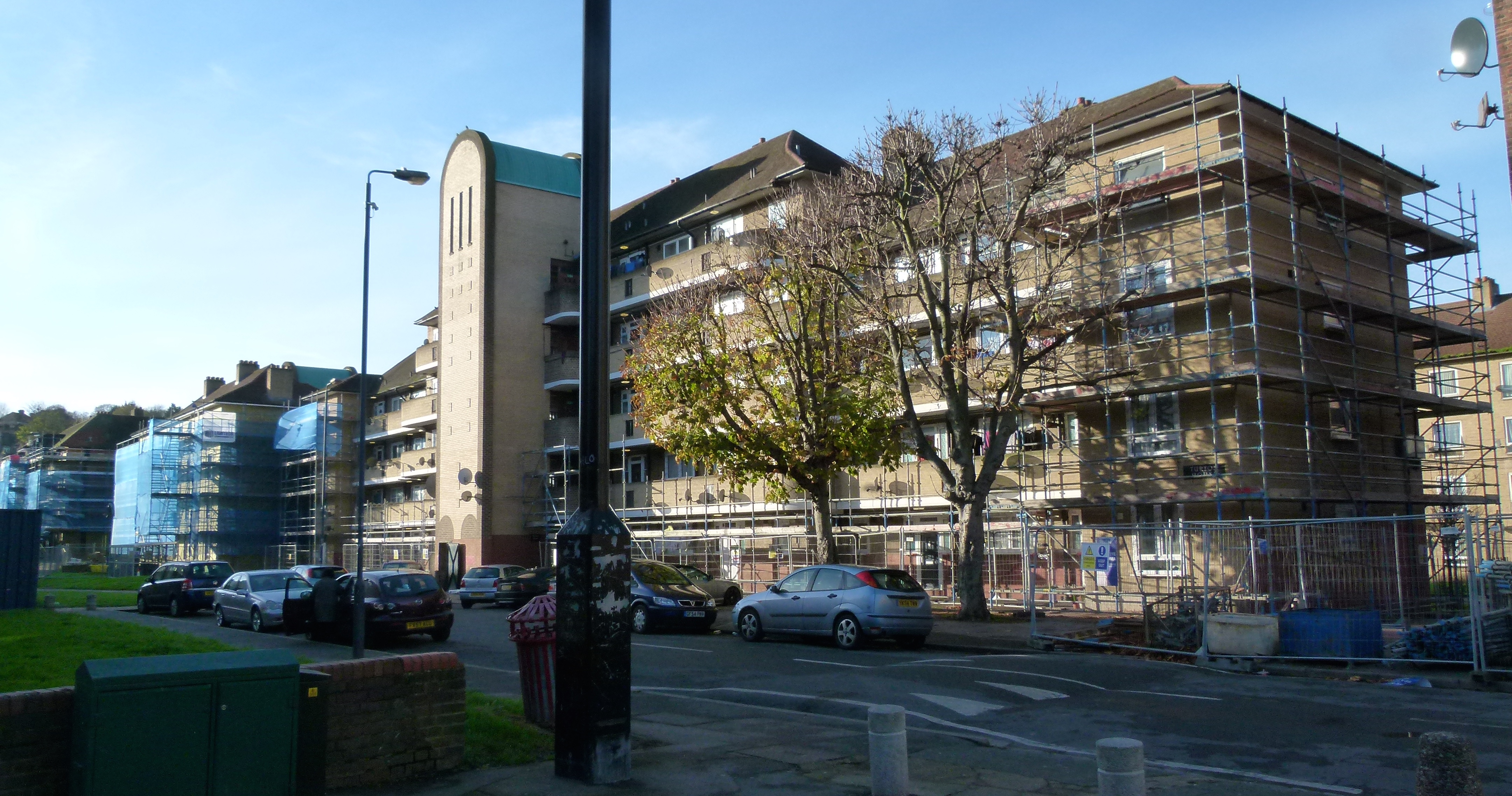
Renovation work, 2015

The Barnfield Estate was part of the Greenwich New Homes Standard regeneration scheme, a £10 million pound investment that built on the previous elements of a similar scheme. The regeneration scheme began in November 2014 and ended in April 2016. The key priorities were to improve the quality of the buildings on the estate, making homes warmer, helping prevent damp conditions and to deliver savings for residents' fuel bills. Most buildings were plastered and painted white to enhance appearance and further insulate homes.

Along with the regeneration scheme, Friends of Barnfield is a community scheme that has secured £1 million funding to regenerate the estate and that focuses on the well-being of the residents. The Barnfield Project is a childcare and community project based in Oak House, Barnfield Road, largely run by volunteers in partnership with the borough.

== Photo gallery ==
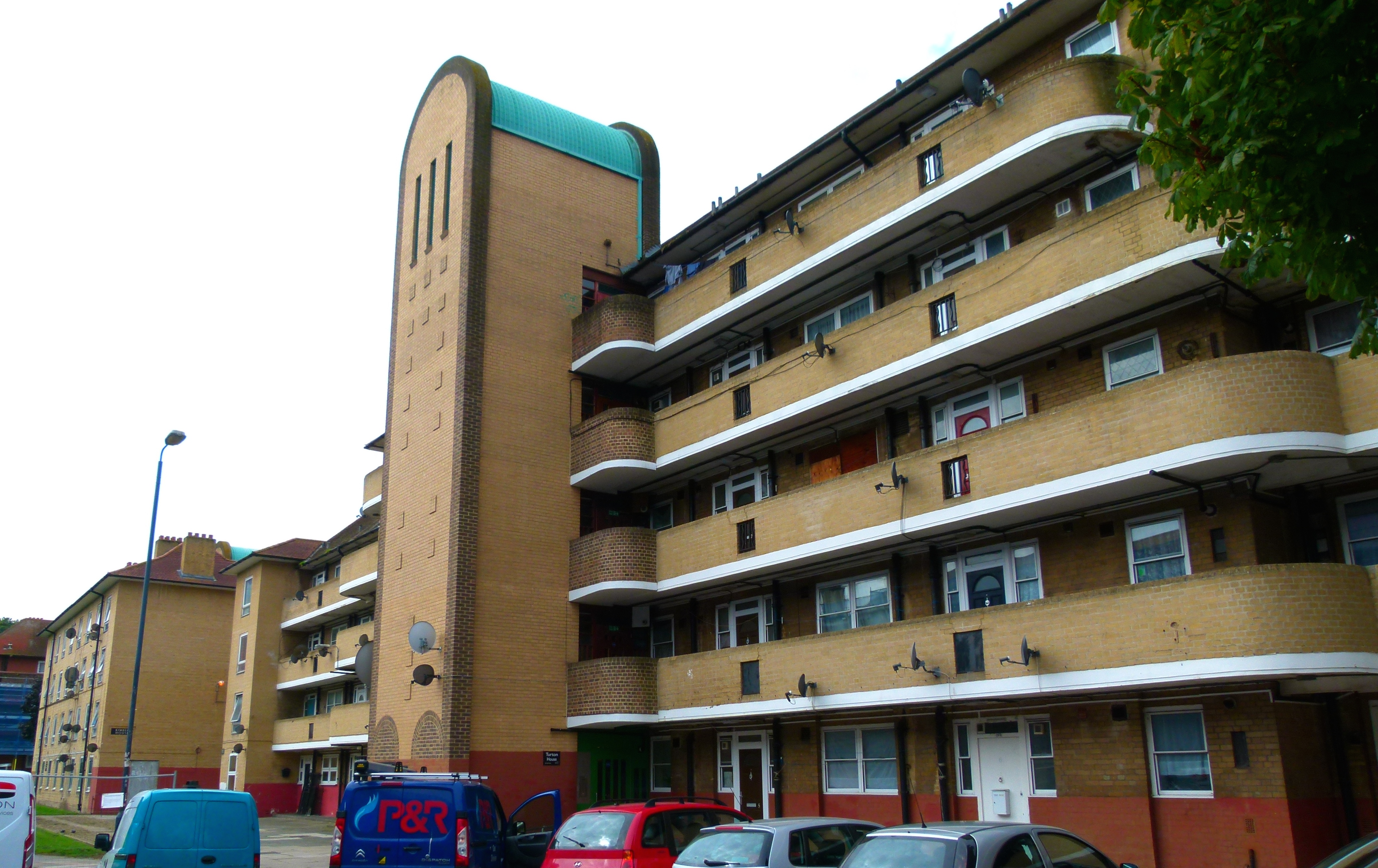

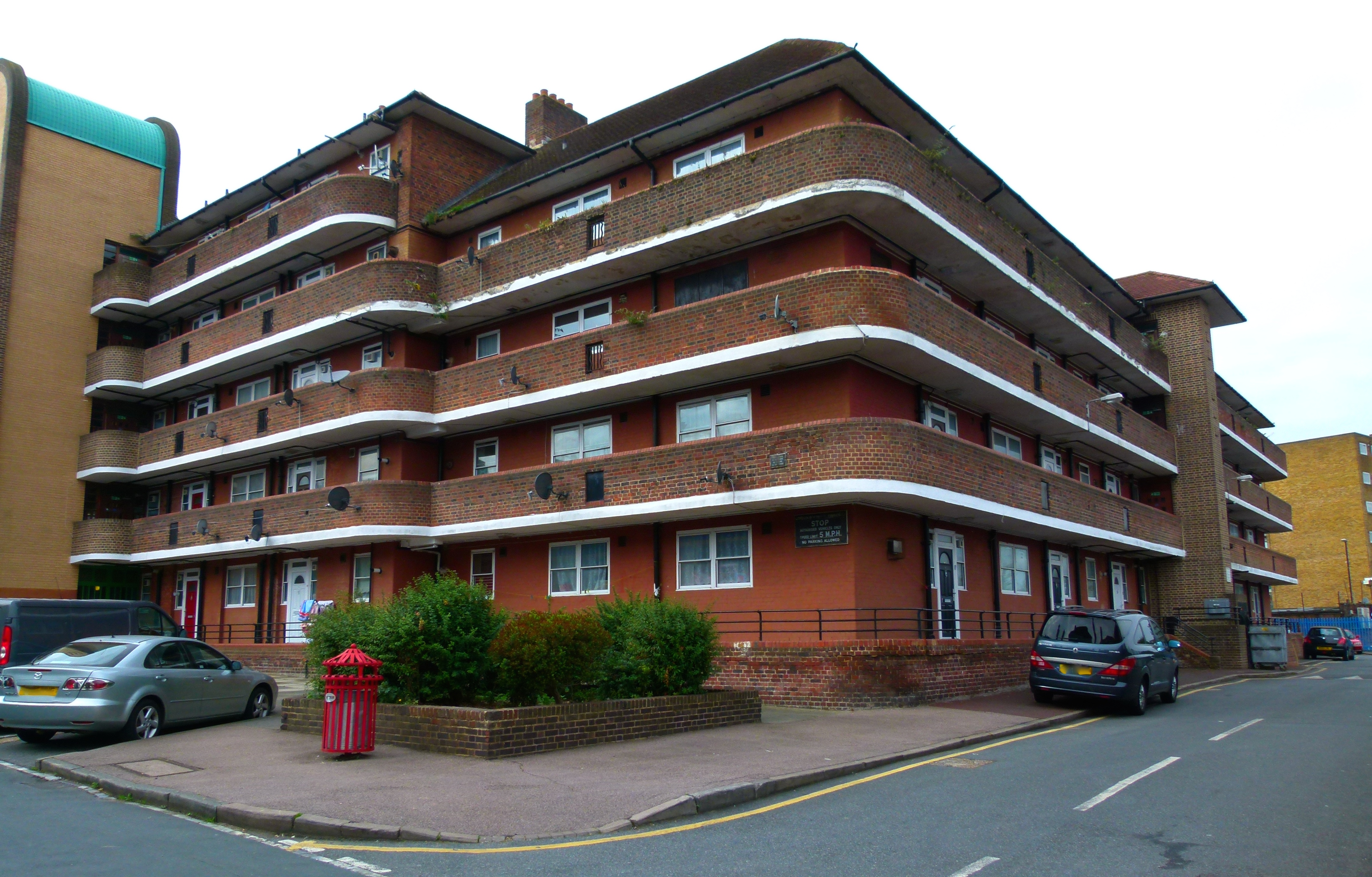

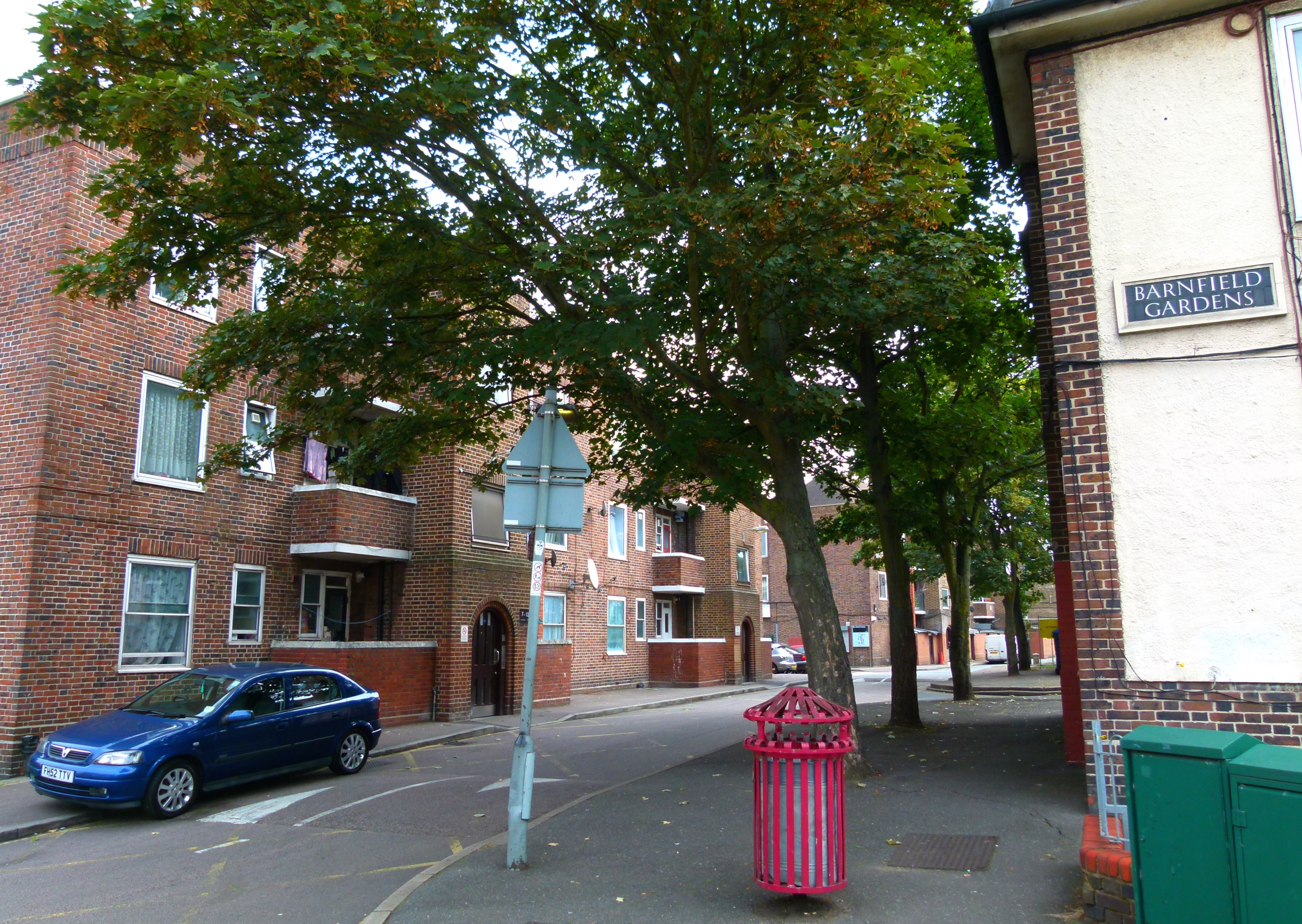

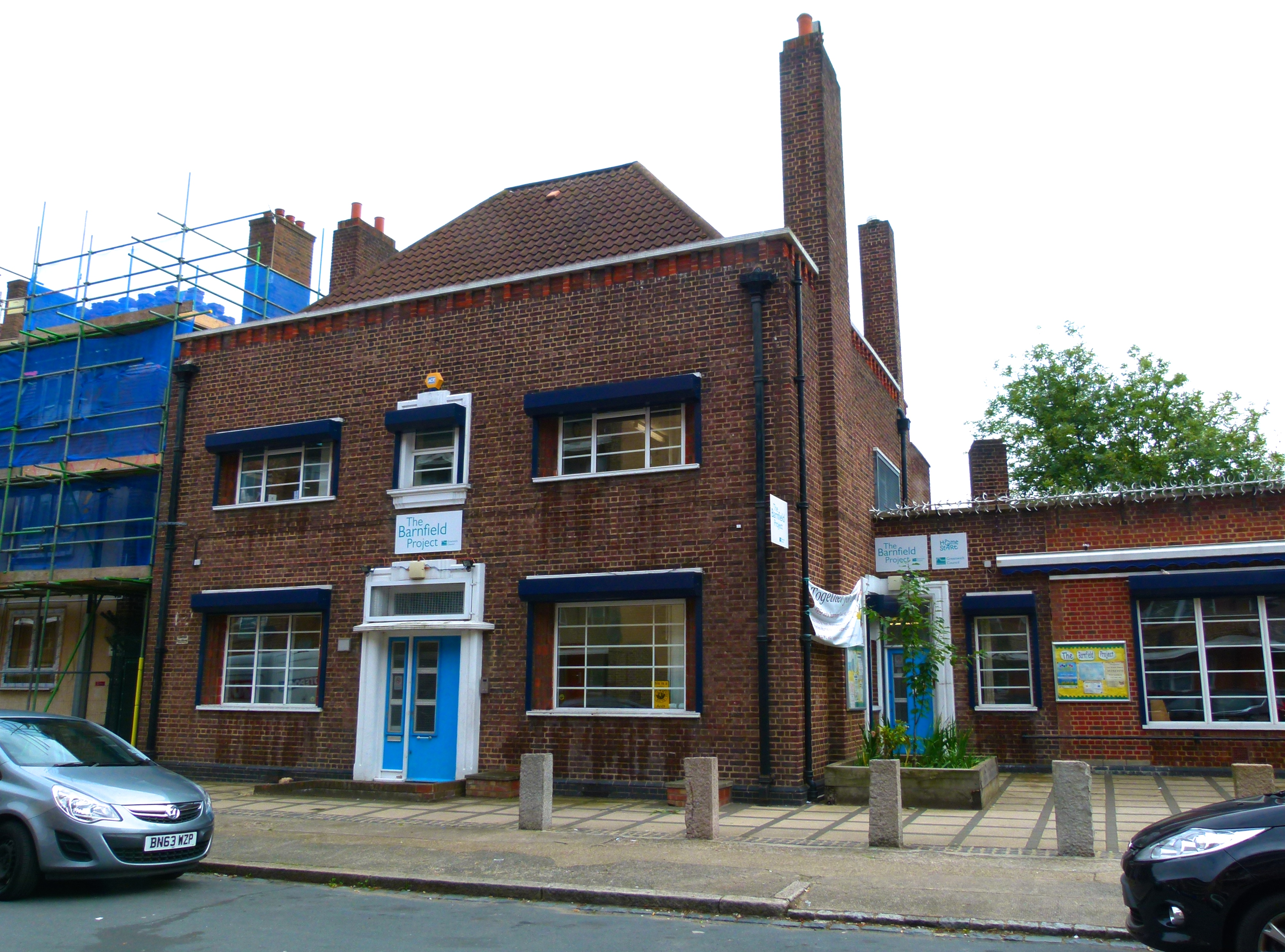

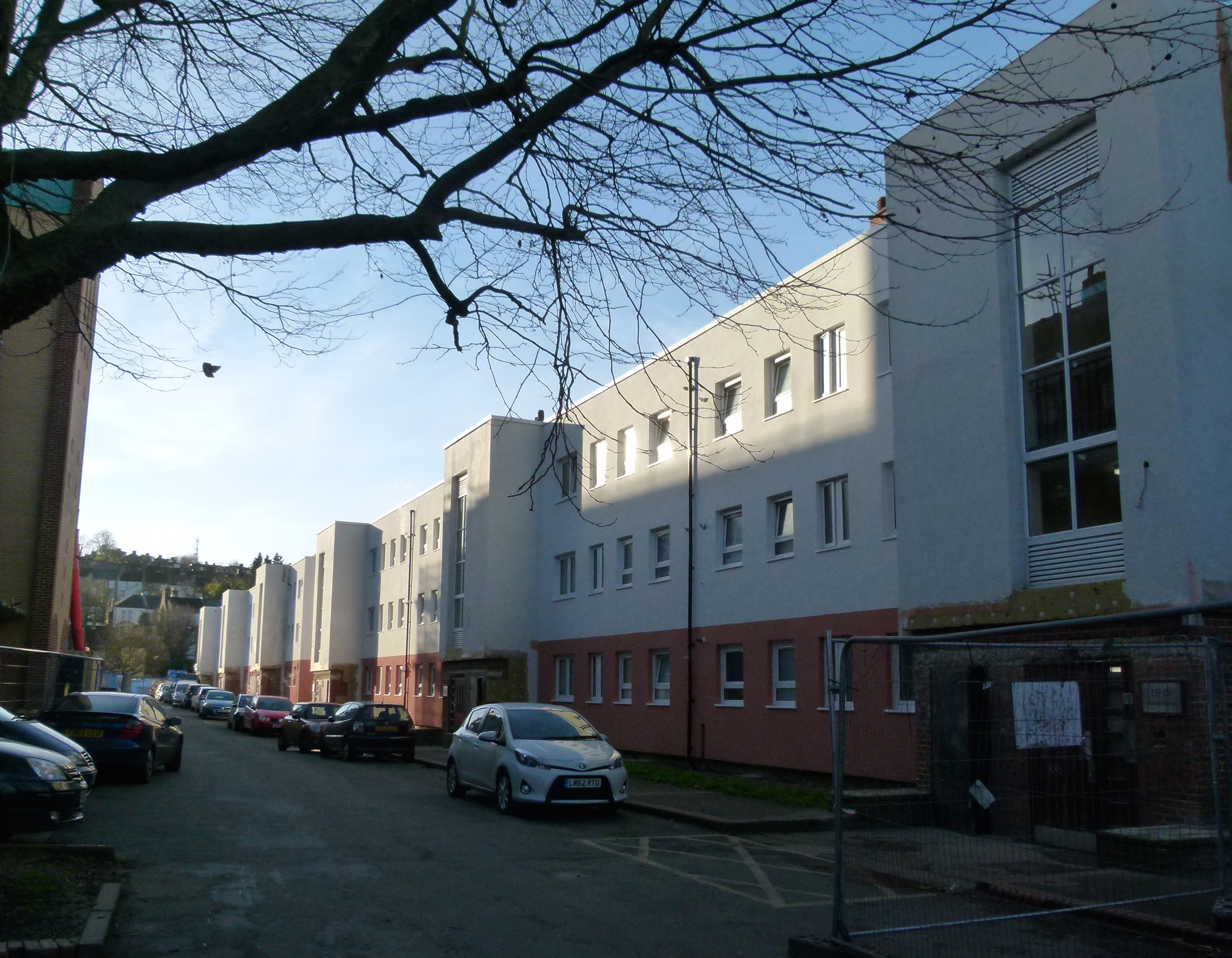

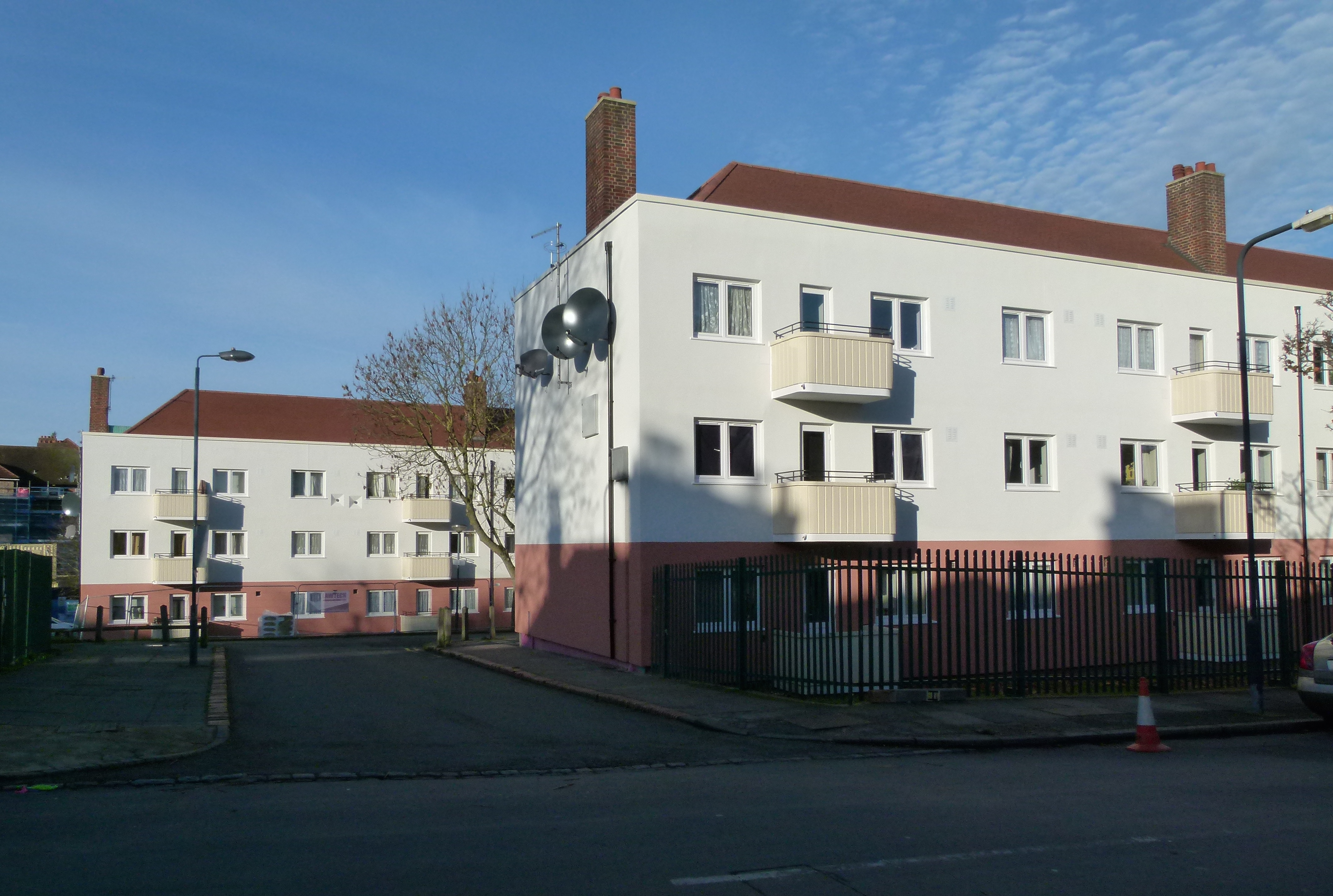

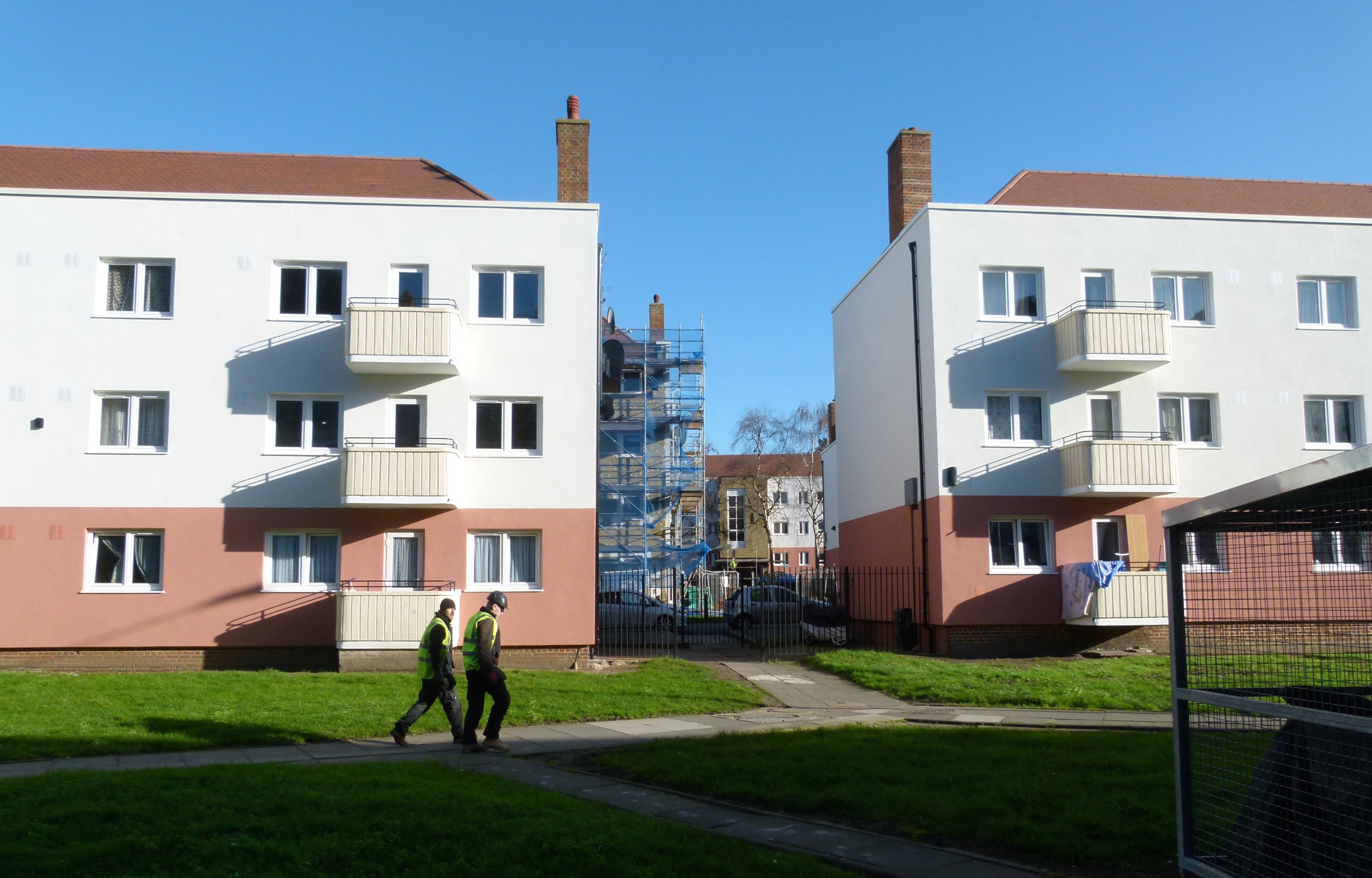

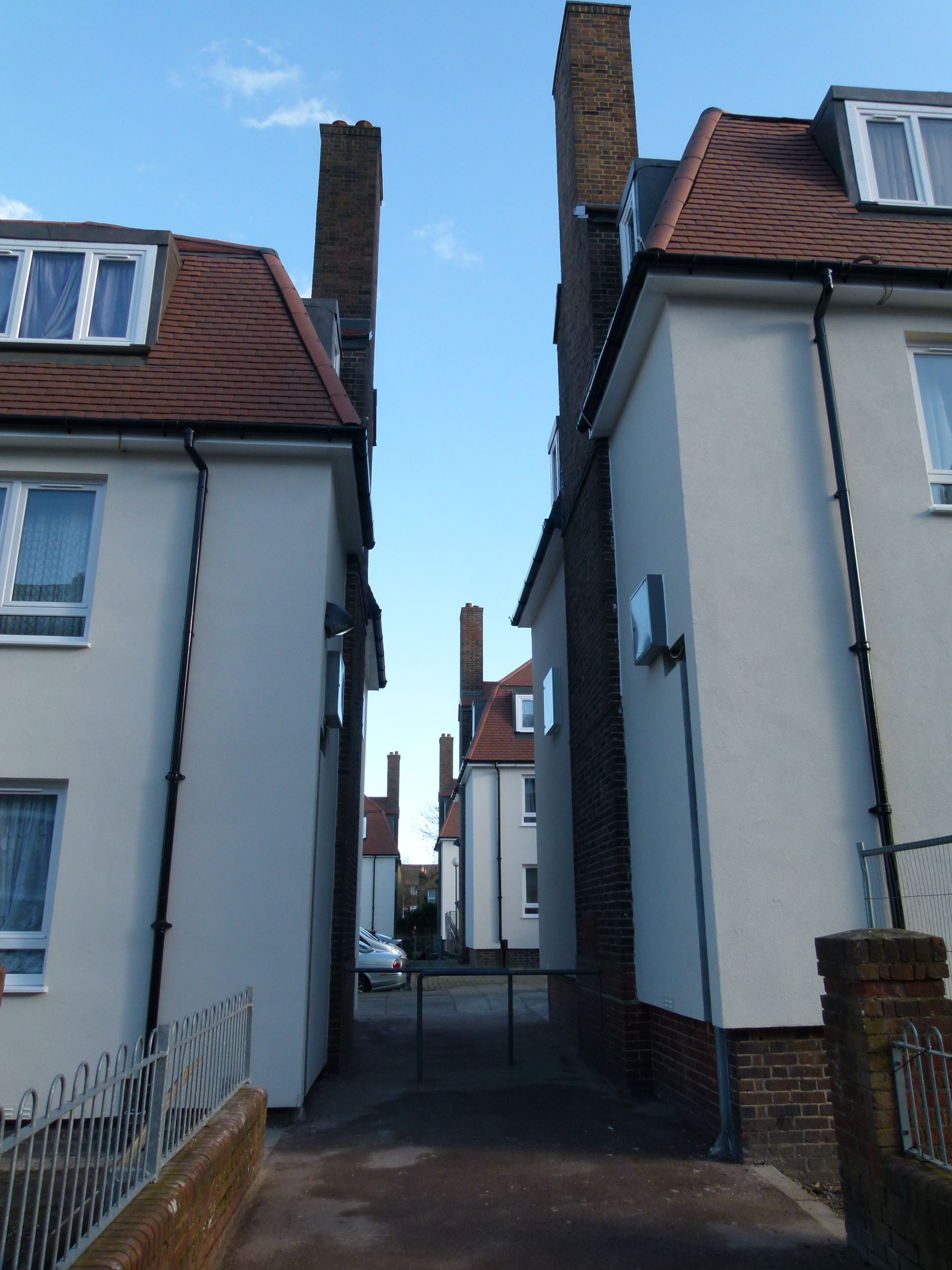
