= Gary Birch (electrical engineer) =

Canadian paralympian

Gary Birch OC OBC
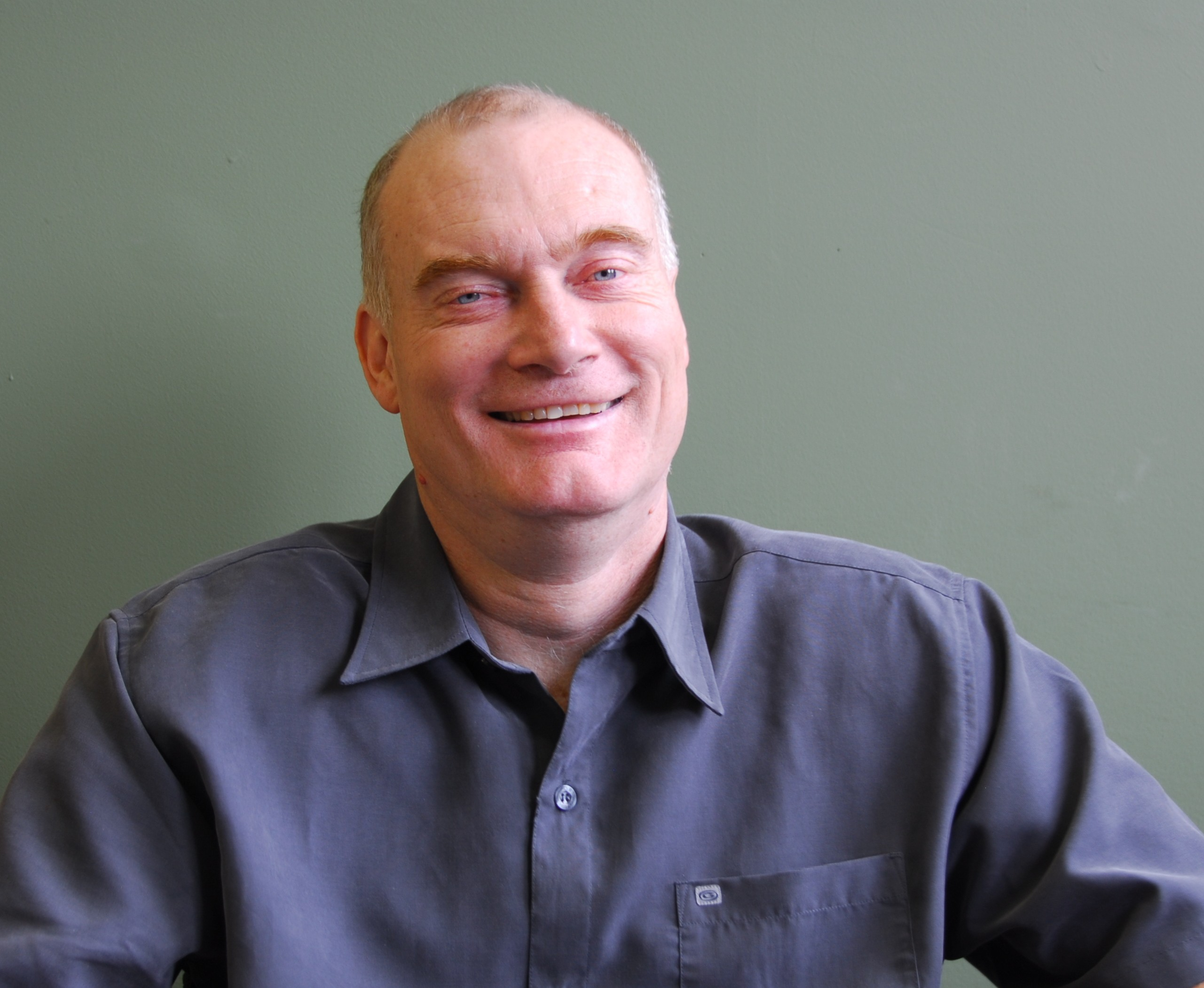
- Gary Birch 2009
- Born: 20 October 1957 (age 69)
- Education: University of Victoria; University of British Columbia
- Known for: Brain–computer interface research Assistive technology Disability advocacy
- Awards: Silver Medal 60m Wheelchair Race Paralympics (1980); Terry Fox Hall of Fame (1988); Order of Canada (2010); Order of British Columbia (2017)
- Scientific career
- Fields: Electrical Engineering; Biomedical Signal Processing

Dr. Gary Birch, OC OBC is a Canadian Paralympian, an expert in brain–computer interface (BCI) technology and executive director of the Neil Squire Society. In 1975, Dr. Birch was involved in an automobile accident which resulted in injuries to the C6 and C7 area of his spine making him a low-level quadriplegic. He was one of the original players of Murderball (wheelchair rugby), and won several medals in the 1980 Summer Paralympics in the Netherlands. In 2008, he was appointed an Officer of the Order of Canada. He continues to champion accessibility through his Research and Development work in assistive technologies at the University of British Columbia, the Rick Hansen Institute, and the Neil Squire Society.

== Early and academic life ==
Born October 20, 1957, Gary Birch grew up in Calgary, Alberta. Dr. Birch was set to begin studying Engineering at the University of Calgary in 1975 when he was involved in a motor vehicle accident that made him a quadriplegic. It took 4 months of acute care and 4 months of rehabilitation at the G.F. Strong Centre in Vancouver for Dr. Birch to begin adjusting to his new life in a wheelchair. In the autumn of 1976, he enrolled in the Pre-Engineering program at the University of Victoria. He earned his B.A. Sc. in Electrical Engineering in 1983, and in 1988 received a Doctorate in Electrical Engineering (Biomedical Signal Processing), from the University of British Columbia in Vancouver.

Dr. Birch competed in the 1980 Summer Paralympics in the Netherlands. There he won the silver medal in the 60m wheelchair race and two bronze medals in swimming, in the 25m backstroke and in the 3 x 25m freestyle relay. Gary was also one of the first participants in Wheelchair Rugby.

In 1982, while attending a lecture at the University of British Columbia, Dr. Birch met a man who would strongly influence the next 30 years of his life, Bill Cameron (Founder, Neil Squire Society). Mr. Cameron had been working with his relative, a high level quadriplegic named Neil Squire, to develop a Morse code based, sip-and-puff communication system for people with severe physical disabilities. Dr. Birch was interested in the emerging technology and knew he wanted to be a part of it. He and another student taught Neil Squire to communicate on the computer by using the sip-and-puff technique. Upon Squire's death in 1984, Cameron formally incorporated the Neil Squire Society. Dr. Birch became its chair and joined the society on a full-time basis when he completed graduate school.

It was at that time that Dr. Birch began work on his brain–computer interface (BCI) project. He chose to research the use of Electroencephalography (EEG) signals from the brain because he felt it would be the most direct type of signal and would be the best form of control for someone with a severe disability.

== Recent achievements ==
In 1994, Dr. Birch became the executive director of the Neil Squire Society. He is also currently an adjunct professor at both the Electrical and Computer Engineering Department of the University of British Columbia, and at the Gerontology Department of Simon Fraser University.

Dr. Birch was inducted into the Terry Fox Hall of Fame in 1998 by the Canadian Foundation for Physically Disabled Persons for extraordinary contributions to enriching the quality of life for people with disabilities. He was also awarded the British Columbia Paraplegic Association's Leadership Award.

The University of British Columbia Alumni Association honored Dr. Birch with a Global Citizen Award in 2009. The award recognizes UBC graduates who have made a significant contribution to the betterment of the global community through one or more of the following: research initiatives, teaching, social, cultural or artistic innovation, healthcare, economic development, human rights and environmental protection.

On 23 October 2008, Dr. Birch was appointed an Officer of the Order of Canada, Canada's highest civilian honor for lifetime achievement, for his work with the Neil Squire Society. Governor General Michaëlle Jean invested him into the Order on April 7, 2010, at Rideau Hall in Ottawa. In 2012, he was awarded the Queen Elizabeth II Diamond Jubilee Medal. In 2016, he was awarded the Dean's Medal of Distinction from the University of British Columbia's Faculty of Applied Science. On 14–16 June 2016, Dr. Birch spoke and co-chaired a roundtable at the 9th session of the Conference of States Parties to the Convention on the Rights of Persons with Disabilities.

In 2017, Dr. Birch was appointed to the Order of British Columbia, the highest form of recognition by the Government of British Columbia.

== Professional contributions ==
=== Founding past president ===
- Neil Squire Society (1984–1987)

=== Chair ===
- Minister's National Advisory Committee for Industry Canada on Assistive Devices (1996–2010)
- Council of Canadians with Disabilities Sub-Committee on Access to Technology (2004–present)
- Rick Hansen Institute BC Neurotrauma Committee (1998–2000)
- Assistive Devices Research and Development Infrastructure Project (1993–1998)

=== Board of directors / Steering committee ===
- Founding Board of the Canadian Administrator of Video Relay Services for the Deaf, Hard of Hearing or Persons who are speech impaired (2014–present)
- Equipment and Assistive Technology Initiative Steering Committee (2011–2015)
- Rick Hansen Institute, Executive Committee, Secretary (2010–2016)
- Rick Hansen Institute, Board Member (2010–2016)
- Rick Hansen Institute Translational Research Advisory Committee (TRAC), Member (2010–2016)
- BC SCI Community Services Network Steering Committee, Member (2010–present)
- Accessworks Steering Committee, Member (2007–2010)
- Spinal Cord Injury Solutions Alliance, Member (2007–2009)
- Canadian Centre on Disability Studies (CCDS), Member (2003–2004)
- British Columbia Institute of Technology (BCIT) Board of Governors, Member (1992–1998)

=== Principal investigator ===
- International Collaboration on Repair Discoveries (ICORD) Rehabilitation Research (2003–present)

=== Member ===
- Disability Advisory Committee, Canada Revenue Agency (reinstated committee) (2017–present)
- Canadian Access and Inclusion Project (2016–present)
- Elections Canada Advisory Group on Disability Issues (2013–present)
- BC Centre for Employment Excellence Steering Committee (2014–2017)
- BC Minister's Council on Employment and Accessibility (2013–present)
- Federal Panel on Labour Market Opportunities for Persons with Disabilities (2012–2013)
- British Columbia Law Institute's Advisory Committee for the Project on Technology, Remoteness, Disability and Evidence (2013–present)
- Advisory committee for the Bell Mobile Telecommunications Accessibility Initiative (2011–2015)
- Technical Advisory Committee for HRSDC on the Data Strategy on People with Disabilities (2010–2013)
- Accessibility Discussion Group for the Canadian Radio-television and Telecommunications Commission (2010–2012)
- Global Accessibility Initiative Steering Committee, Rick Hansen Foundation (2010–2011)
- Employment Program for Persons with Disabilities for BC Advisory Committee (2009–2012)
- Network Partners Council for Provincial Equipment and Assistive Devices Committee of BC (2008–2015)
- Council for Canadians with Disabilities Sub-Committee on Social Policy (2008–present)
- Disability Advisory Committee for 2010 Legacies Now (2007–2011)
- Provincial Equipment and Assistive Disabilities Committee for BC (2006–2015)
- Intelligent Computational Assistive Science & Tech R&D Network Task Force (2006–2008)
- National Disability Advisory Committee for Service Canada (2006–2009)
- Canada Revenue Agency Advisory Committee on Disability Tax Measures (2005–2007)
- Disabilities Health Research Network in BC (DHRN) Advisory Committee (2005–2010)
- Canadian Standards Association (CSA) Technical SUB Committee on Barrier-Free Design for Dispensing Machines (2003–2009)
- International Collaboration on Repair Discoveries (ICORD) Community Advisory Panel (2003–2010)
- Federal Technical Advisory Committee on Disability Tax Measures (2003–2004)
- National Volunteer Sector Initiative Info Management/Info Tech Joint Table (2000–2002)
- National Opportunity Fund Technical and Operations Committee (1999–2005)
- Rick Hansen Institute (RHI) National Neurotrauma Rehab R&D Peer Review Panel (1999–2000)
- G.F. Strong Rehabilitation Centre Research Advisory and Review Committee (1998–2014)
- Canadian Standards Association (CSA), Executive and Technical Committee on Assistive Technologies for Persons with Disabilities (1996–present)
- BC Minister's Advisory Council on Information Technology (1996–1999)
- Persons with Disabilities Advisory Committee on Employment Issues for BC Region of the Federal Government and the Provincial Government (1994–2011)
- Premier's Advisory Council on Science and Technology (1993–2002)
- Federal Task Force on Disability Issues Reference Group (1993–2006)
- National Advisory Committee Industry Canada's Program for the National Strategy on the Integration of Persons with Disabilities (1991–1996)
- International Conference on Persons with Disabilities National Advisory Committee for Independence '92 (1989–1992)
- Science Council of BC Health Care Sector Committee for Strategic Planning for Applied Research and Knowledge (1988–1983)
- British Columbia Institute of Technology (BCIT) Technology Centre Advisory Committee (1989–2006)
- National Research Council of Canada (NRC) Associate Committee on R&D for Rehabilitation of Disabled Persons (1989–1990)

=== Expert and peer review committees ===
- Expert reviewer, European Commission 7th RTD Framework Programme: ICT Research Work Programme – Accessible and Inclusive ICT (2007–2013)
- Expert reviewer, SCI Solutions Alliance, Research Projects (2008–2012)
- External reviewer, NSERC, Committees 331 and 335 (2007–2008)
- Peer reviewer, BC Rehab Foundation, William Fraser Awards (2000–2008)
- Expert peer reviewer, Ontario Government, Ontario Rehabilitation Technology Consortium, Assistive Technology, R&D Projects (2004–05, 2001)
