= Sarah Thompson =

Sarah or Sara Thompson may refer to:

- Sarah Thompson (actress) (born 1979), American actress
- Sara Thompson (Canadian actress) (born 1995), Canadian actress
- Sarah Thompson, Countess Rumford (1774–1852), first American countess
- Sarah Thompson (Home and Away), fictional character in the Australian soap opera
- Sarah Thompson (athlete) (?–2010), Canadian athlete and powerlifter
- USS Sara Thompson, United States naval ship
- Sarah Thompson (physicist)
- Sara Thompson (food scientist)

== See also ==
- Sarah Thomson (disambiguation)
