= Winberg =

Winberg is a Swedish surname. Notable people with the surname include:

- Amanda Winberg (born 1996), Swedish singer-songwriter, model, and influence
- Carl Winberg (1867–1954), Swedish Communist leader
- Caroline Winberg (born 1985), Swedish model
- Claes-Ulrik Winberg (1925–1989), Swedish industrialist and business executive
- Margareta Winberg (born 1947), Swedish Social Democratic politician
- Mona Winberg (1932–2009), Canadian journalist and disability rights activist
- Pernilla Winberg (born 1989), Swedish ice hockey player

== See also ==
- Gösta Winbergh (1943–2002), Swedish tenor
