= Neil Squire Society =

Canadian non-profit organization

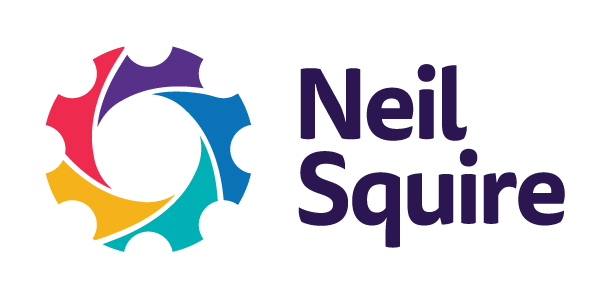
- Neil Squire logo
- Formation: Neil Squire Rehabilitation Society: June 19, 1984 Neil Squire Foundation: January 15, 1985 Neil Squire Society: October 18, 2004
- Type: Non-profit organization
- Legal status: active
- Headquarters: Burnaby, British Columbia, Canada
- Location: Fredericton, New Brunswick, Ottawa, Ontario, Regina, Saskatchewan, Burnaby, British Columbia
- Region served: Canada
- Executive Director: Dr. Gary Birch
- Staff: 73
- Website: www.neilsquire.ca

Neil Squire Society is a Canadian national not-for-profit organization that helps Canadians with disabilities through advocacy, computer-based, assistive technology, research and development, and various employment programs. There are four locations across Canada.

== History ==
The Neil Squire Society began as a result of Bill Cameron's efforts with his relative Neil Squire. When Neil was paralyzed from the neck down in a car accident in 1980, Bill created a “sip-and-puff” machine to allow Neil to communicate using Morse code. Soon thereafter, Bill and a small group of volunteers began teaching other rehabilitation patients to use computers to enhance their independence. This marked the creation of the Neil Squire Society's first program, Computer Comfort.

After Neil's death in 1984, the group decided to name its new organization in his honour. The group was originally incorporated as the Neil Squire Rehabilitation Society, then the Neil Squire Foundation. The group went through one more name change and is now the Neil Squire Society.

Headquartered in Burnaby, British Columbia, Canada, the Neil Squire Society also has offices in Fredericton, Ottawa, and Regina.

== Programs and services ==
=== Programs ===
The Neil Squire Society provides employment programs, computer tutoring, online services and assistive technology for persons with disabilities.

=== Services ===
A for-profit social enterprise, it provides workplace ergonomic and assistive technology for individuals and employers. Clients of this program begin with an assessment in one of the Neil Squire Society's Assistive Technology for Employment Centre (ATEC) labs where they are matched with and trained on the assistive technology that best suits their needs.

=== Research and development ===
One of the major focuses of the Neil Squire Society is the development of technologies that enable persons with disabilities to be fully involved with society. The Research and Development arm of the Society facilitates the development of these technologies.

The Research and Development Group has been responsible for many advancements in the field of accessibility.
