= Canadian Disability Hall of Fame =

Hall of fame for Canadians who improved life for disabled people

The Canadian Disability Hall of Fame (formerly the Terry Fox Hall of Fame), recognizes "outstanding Canadians who have made extraordinary contributions to enriching the quality of life for people with physical disabilities". It is run by the Canadian Foundation for Physically Disabled Persons and located at Metro Hall, 55 John St., in downtown Toronto. The Hall is named after Terry Fox, a cancer research activist who attempted a run across Canada, dubbed the "Marathon of Hope".

== Inductees ==
=== 1993 ===
- Edwin A. Baker
- John Gibbons Counsell
- Rick Hansen
- Robert Wilson Jackson
- Margaret McLeod
- André Viger

=== 1994 ===
- Arnold Boldt
- William Cameron
- Beryl Potter
- Robert L. Rumball

=== 1995 ===
- Bruce Halliday
- Albin T. Jousse
- Jeremy Rempel
- Mona Winberg

=== 1996 ===
- Arlette Lefebvre
- Joanne Mucz
- Vicki Keith Munro
- Walter Wu

=== 1997 ===
- Jeff Adams
- Alice Laine and Audrey Morrice
- David Onley
- Whipper Billy Watson

=== 1998 ===
- Lincoln M. Alexander
- Gary Birch
- Harry Botterell
- Frank Bruno

=== 1999 ===
- Clifford Chadderton
- Leslie Lam
- Pier Morten
- Allan Simpson

=== 2000 ===
- Morris (Mickey) Milner
- Eugene Reimer
- Sarah Thompson
- Sam Sullivan

=== 2001 ===
- Amy Doofenbaker
- Ivy Granstrom
- Tom Hainey
- James MacDougall

=== 2002 ===
- Mae Brown and Joan Mactavish
- Stephanie McClellan
- Jo-Anne Robinson
- Robert Steadward

=== 2003 ===
- Joanne Berdan
- Jack Donohue
- Brian Keown
- Charles Tator

=== 2004 ===
- Carlos Costa
- Johanna Johnson
- David Lepofsky
- Henry Wohler

=== 2005 ===
- Peter Eriksson
- Lucy Fletcher and Robert Fletcher
- Patrick Jarvis
- Chantal Petitclerc

=== 2006 ===
- Michael Edgson
- Jeneece Edroff
- Steven Fletcher
- June Hooper

=== 2007 ===
- Elizabeth Grandbois, Builder
- Joanne Smith, Achiever
- Lauren Woolstencroft, Athlete

=== 2008 ===
- Adrian Anantawan, Achiever
- Linda Crabtree, Achiever
- Dr. Geoff Fernie, Builder
- Daniel Wesley, Athlete

=== 2009 ===
- Jeff Healey, Achiever
- David Hingsburger, Builder
- Diane Roy, Athlete
- Jill Taylor and Gary Taylor, Achievers

=== 2010 ===
- Colette Bourgonje, Athlete
- Alan Dean, Builder
- David Shannon, Achiever
- Jeffrey Tiessen, Achiever

=== 2011 ===
- Archie Allison, Builder
- Benoit Huot, Athlete
- Brian McKeever and Robin McKeever, Athletes
- Celia Southward, Achiever

=== 2012 ===
- Ann Caine, Builder
- Tracey Ferguson, Athlete
- Robert Hampson, Achiever
- Joyce Thompson, Builder (posthumous)

=== 2013 ===
- Raymond Cohen, Builder
- David Crombie, Lifetime Achiever
- Stephanie Dixon, Athlete
- Ramesh Ferris, Achiever
- Jerry Johnston and Annie Johnston, Builders

=== 2014 ===
- Sudarshan Gautam, Achiever
- Hon. Vim Kochhar, Lifetime Achiever
- Mark Wafer, Builder
- Elisabeth Walker-Young, Achiever
- Chris Williamson, Athlete

=== 2015 ===
- Lauren Barwick, Builder
- Bernard Gluckstein, Achiever
- Rick Mercer, Achiever

=== 2016 ===
- Marni Abbott-Peter, Athlete
- Tim Frick, Builder
- Terry Kelly, Achiever

=== 2017 ===
- Todd Nicholson, Athlete
- Jim Sanders, Builder
- Shirley Shelby, Achiever
- Rob Snoek, Achiever

=== 2018 ===
- James G. Kyte, Athlete
- Alvin Law, Achiever
- Brian Mulroney, Builder

=== 2019 ===
- Bradley Bowden, Athlete
- Brian MacPherson, Builder
- Richard Peter, Athlete
- Tracy Schmitt, Achiever

=== 2020 ===
- Tim Cormode, Builder
- Martha Sandoval Gustafson, Athlete
- Meenu Sikand, Achiever

=== 2021 ===
- Vivian Berkeley, Athlete
- Frank Folino, Achiever
- Carla Qualtrough, Builder

=== 2022 ===
- Josh Dueck, Achiever
- Lorin MacDonald, Builder
- Greg Westlake, Athlete

=== 2023 ===
- Chantal Benoit, Athlete
- Stephen J. Harper, Builder
- Michelle Stilwell, Achiever

=== 2024 ===
- Penny Bennett, Builder
- Tim Rose, Achiever
- Francis Roussel, Athlete
