= Beryl Potter =

British-born Canadian disability rights activist

- Born: Liverpool, England
- Died: May 1, 1998; Toronto, Ontario, Canada
- Known for: Disability rights activism

Beryl Potter was a British-born Canadian disability rights activist. She was involved in many disability rights organizations in Ontario including the Trans-Action Coalition, the Scarborough Recreation Club for Disabled Adults, the Ontario Action Awareness Association, and the Coalition on Employment Equity for Persons with Disabilities (CEEPD). Potter was a triple amputee and was blind in one eye as a result of complications due to a fall at work.

== Career ==
Prior to becoming an amputee, Potter worked as a manager at a Kresge's department store and, later, the Women's Bakery at St. Clair Avenue in the Toronto suburb of Scarborough.

=== Activism ===
In the early 1970s, Potter was involved in demonstrations lobbying for "parallel transit" in Toronto as part of the Trans-Action Coalition. Potter helped to organize a volunteer service of converted, wheelchair accessible vans to provide door-to-door transit for disabled persons. She later lobbied for the Toronto Transit Commission (TTC) to take over the program with appropriate funding, trained drivers, and dedicated vehicles. This initiative evolved into Toronto's WheelTrans program in 1975. The TTC did not officially take over the WheelTrans program until 1989. Potter stepped down as chairperson of the Trans-Action Coalition in 1989.

Potter formed the Scarborough Recreation Club for Disabled Adults in 1976. Potter was a co-founder of the Coalition on Employment Equity for Persons with Disabilities (CEEPD). She was also the founder of the Ontario Action Awareness Association, an association also referred to as Action Awareness.

In April 1986, Potter led activists from across Canada to protest the inadequacies of the federal employment equity legislation known as Bill C-62 in Ottawa. Potter was forcibly removed from the gallery of the House of Commons after a verbal outcry against claims made by Flora MacDonald. MacDonald, speaking on behalf of then-Prime Minister Brian Mulroney, claimed that the government had attempted to consult disability rights organizations, including sending a letter to Potter. Potter, from the back of the gallery, yelled "My name is Beryl Potter and I've received no such letter!".

=== Politics ===
In 1985, Potter was approached to run in the provincial election in Ontario. She declined due to commitments to her involvement with Action Awareness. In 1990, Potter ran as the liberal candidate in Beaches-Woodbine to be a Member of the Provincial Parliament (MPP) of Ontario. Potter lost to NDP candidate Frances Lankin.

1990 Ontario general election
Party	Candidate	Votes	%	±%
New Democratic	Frances Lankin	14,381	58.4	-
Liberal	Beryl Potter	6,329	25.7	-
Progressive Conservative	Kevin Forest	3,535	14.3	-
Independent	Sam Vitulli	400	1.6	-

== Personal life ==
Potter was born in Liverpool, but lived most of her life in the Toronto district of Scarborough, after moving there in 1954. She had three children with husband Victor Carter: Dianne Juda, Victor Carter Sr., and Dennis Potter.

Potter was a triple amputee. She had both legs and one arm amputated after complications due to blood clots from a fall while working at the bakery and subsequent phlebitis due to a car accident. Potter also became blind in one eye as a result of doctors using iodine, which Potter was allergic to, to treat an infection. During the six-year period in which Potter was undergoing surgeries to deal with these health conditions, Potter became addicted to pain killers and was left by her husband. Because her legs were not amputated at the same length, Potter later developed uneven wheelchair posture and ensuing complications with pain and swelling.

Potter died on May 1, 1998, at the age of 71.

== Awards ==
Potter was made a member of the Order of Ontario in 1988 for her work as a disability rights activist. The same year, Potter was awarded a King Clancy Award for her contributions to disability rights. In 1994, Potter was inducted into the Terry Fox Hall of Fame alongside Arnold Boldt, Rev. Robert Rumball, and William Cameron. Potter was made a member of the Order of Canada in 1996.
