= Gary Birch =

Gary Birch may refer to:

- Gary Birch (footballer) (born 1981), English footballer and manager
- Gary Birch (electrical engineer) (born 1957), Canadian Paralympian and electrical engineer
