= Sarah Thomson =

Sarah Thomson may refer to:

- Sarah Thomson (actress), with roles in Power Rangers and Shortland Street
- Sarah Thomson (publisher), former publisher of Women's Post magazine and a 2010 mayoral candidate in Toronto
- Sarah Thomson, British publisher, co-founder of Ebiquity and First News newspaper

== See also ==
- Sarah Thompson (disambiguation)
