= Tracy Schmitt =

Canadian athlete and motivational speaker

Tracy Schmitt (commonly referred to as "Unstoppable Tracy") is a Canadian athlete and motivational speaker. As a quadruple amputee, she won a bronze medal in alpine downhill para-skiing at the Ontario Parasport Games and was inducted into the Canadian Disability Hall of Fame.

== Early life and education ==
Schmitt was born in Toronto without fully-developed limbs. When her mother enrolled her in kindergarten at Berner Trail Public School, the principal refused to let her enter the school for fear she would be dependent on the teacher. After Schmitt's mother convinced the principal to let her enroll for a week, she helped all the other students tie their shoelaces for recess. She earned her Bachelor of Arts degree from York University, Bachelor of Recreation and Leisure Studies from Brock University, Bachelor of Education from Queen's University, and MBA from Rotman School of Management.

== Career ==
In 1991, Schmitt and 13 others Canadians climbed mountains in the Himalayas with the support of Ontario March for Dimes. After earning her Bachelor of Education, Schmitt taught at schools in Jamaica, Uganda and Nepal. She eventually returned to Toronto and enrolled in the Rotman School of Management to earn her MBA.

With her degree, Schmitt accepted a position in Human resources, which she was let go from in 2010. Following her termination, Schmitt travelled to San Diego to partake in regatta, which she won. By 2013, she was competing in sailor competitions and placed second in the High Liner Mobility Cup in the Silver fleet. A few years later, she left her house and moved to Miami, Florida to practice sailing at an international Paralympic sports club. Her pursuit of Paralympic sports earned her a position with the Pan/Parapan American Games Organizing Committee. She was the manager of planning and integration for the 2015 Pan Am and Para-Pan Am games taking place in Toronto. Schmitt eventually moved to Florida to train with a gold medalist Olympic sailor and coach.

Schmitt competed in alpine downhill para-skiing at the Ontario Parasport Games, earning a bronze medal. As a result of her involvement in Paralympic sports, Schmitt was hired by Air Canada and Shoppers Drug Mart as a corporate leadership developer. She is a motivational speaker and teaches part-time at Variety Village. In 2017, Schmitt received the Robert W. Jackson Award, Ontario Premier Award, and C-SASIL Lifetime Achievement Award.

In 2019, Schmitt was inducted into the Canadian Disability Hall of Fame as an achiever.
