= Mae Brown =

First deafblind Canadian to earn a university degree

- Born: 1935; Thunder Bay, Ontario, Canada
- Died: 1973 (aged 37–38)
- Education: University of Toronto
- Known for: First deafblind Canadian to earn a university degree
- Honours: Terry Fox Hall of Fame, 2002

Mae Brown (1935–1973) was the second deaf-blind woman and the first deaf-blind Canadian to earn a university degree. She graduated from the Scarborough campus of the University of Toronto in 1972.

== Early life ==
Brown was born in Thunder Bay in 1935. Her sight and hearing deteriorated throughout her childhood; by high school her vision had deteriorated to the point where she could not read a blackboard, and she dropped out. An operation performed on Brown later in her teens to remove a brain tumor led to the complete loss of her hearing as well.

== Education ==
Brown registered with the Canadian National Institute for the Blind, who provided her with training in communication methods such as Braille, and employment. CNIB also provided Brown with a tutor to help her complete her high school education. When Brown enrolled at the University of Toronto, the CNIB found an interpreter for her, Joan Mactavish, as well as a team of 35 volunteers who translated Brown's textbooks into Braille. Mactavish translated lectures and exams for Brown using finger-spelling into Brown's hand. Brown was able to give her responses orally. Some exams took multiple days to complete using this process, and Brown's degree in history and psychology ultimately took 5 years for her to earn.

== Career ==
After graduating, Brown returned to employment with CNIB, becoming their head of deaf-blind affairs and implementing networks and services for deaf-blind people in Canada. These included social groups, publications, and testing of technological devices.

== Death ==
Brown died suddenly in 1973 of another brain tumor. An autopsy revealed that it and the numerous other tumors within her body were caused by neurofibromatosis. Her college tutor, Joan Mactavish, continued to implement her ideas for deaf-blind interventions after Brown's death.

== Awards and recognition ==
In 2002, Brown's joint work with Mactavish was recognized by their induction into the Terry Fox Hall of Fame.
