= Mary Kitagawa =

Canadian educator (born 1934)

Mary Kitagawa OBC
- Born: Keiko Mary Murakami; July 30, 1934 (age 92); Salt Spring Island, British Columbia, Canada
- Spouse: Tosh Kitagawa
- Children: 2

Mary Kitagawa (née Murakami; born July 30, 1934) OBC is a Canadian educator. As a Japanese-Canadian growing up in British Columbia, her family was placed in various Japanese Internment Camps during World War II. After the war, she accepted a position in Kitsilano Secondary School and was later awarded an honorary degree from the University of British Columbia.

== Early life ==
Kitagawa was born and raised in Salt Spring Island, British Columbia to a family of five. When she was seven years old, her father was arrested as part of the incarceration of Japanese Canadians across British Columbia's coastline during the Second World War. The rest of her family would eventually join her father in various Internment Camps and lose possession of their farm. After the war ended, she returned to Salt Spring Island in 1954.

== Career ==
Kitagawa wished to begin her teaching career at home on Salt Spring Island but faced prejudices due to her race. As a result, she began her teaching career at Kitsilano Secondary School, where she would meet her future husband. After her children were born, she began work as a substitute teacher and eventually enrolled in the University of British Columbia (UBC). In 2011, Kitagawa successfully advocated UBC to gift the 76 Japanese Canadian students who were forced out of UBC following the Attack on Pearl Harbor honorary degrees. She was later the recipient of the 2013 Queen Elizabeth II Diamond Jubilee Medal and National Association of Japanese Canadians Leadership Award. Kitagawa and her husband Tosh also sat on the Community Council for the Landscapes of Injustice project at the University of Victoria.

In 2018, Kitagawa received the Order of British Columbia for her activism efforts for Japanese Canadians.
