= Unity Bainbridge =

Canadian artist and writer (1916–2017)

- Born: July 6, 1916; Victoria, British Columbia, Canada
- Died: November 30, 2017 (aged 101); West Vancouver, British Columbia, Canada
- Education: Vancouver School of Art 1932-1936
- Known for: Drawing, painting, writing
- Movement: Modernism, Contemporary Realism
- Awards: Order of British Columbia 1993

Unity Bainbridge OBC (July 6, 1916 – November 30, 2017) was a Canadian artist and writer of poetry inspired by the indigenous peoples of the Pacific Northwest Coast and its landscape.

== Personal life ==
Unity Bainbridge was born in Victoria, British Columbia. She was also known as Unity Bainbridge Brewster. Her parents were George P. and Deborah Bainbridge. Unity was the eldest of three sisters; her two younger sisters were Ursula Ridgeway and Monica Resnick. She had one daughter, Deborah Ryan. Her niece is Lynn Johnston the comic artist of For Better or For Worse

Bainbridge married in 1946, moved to San Francisco, CA for five years, then moved back to British Columbia. She was a long-time resident of West Vancouver, British Columbia. She died there on November 30, 2017, at the age of 101.

== Education ==
Bainbridge studied in Vancouver at the then newly formed Vancouver School of Art from 1932 to 1936 under Grace Melvin and Charles Hepburn Scott. After graduating from the Vancouver School of Art, she attended the Cornish School of Art in Seattle briefly but returned to Canada within the year.

== Career ==
After returning from Seattle, Bainbridge made her living as a portrait painter in Vancouver. She felt strongly that portraits should be painted from the source, not from a photograph. This led her to eventually start traveling around British Columbia painting portraits of people during the summers and then returning to Vancouver in the fall. She was especially drawn to paint portraits of the native community of northern B.C.

In the early 1930s, Bainbridge trekked through a vast area of British Columbia's remote wilderness. She preferred to work alone and shunned most art groups. She was invited to join the Canadian Portrait Academy as a Founding Academician but declined this offer.

She met Lawren Harris in Vancouver in the 1930s and A.Y. Jackson in Toronto and considered Arthur Lismer and A.Y. Jackson among her many mentors.

In 1976-77 she compiled her research and images from repeated trips to communities between Pemberton and Lillooet. The works comprise Songs of Seton and Lullaby of Lillooet, two small books Bainbridge published in limited editions."

== Exhibitions ==
- Royal Canadian Academy Exhibition, 1938
- Seymour Art Gallery, July 2 - August 15, 1986
- Seymour Art Gallery, October 25 - November, 1989
- Seymour Art Gallery, 1990
- Heffel Gallery, Early British Columbian Woman Artists, June 1995.
- West Vancouver Museum and Archives, Generations: Five Decades of Art in West Vancouver, 1999.
- Ferry Building Gallery, West Vancouver, BC. Beauty is all there is: Unity Bainbridge - A Retrospective, Oct 24, 2017 to Nov 5, 2017.
- Vancouver Art Gallery, Vancouver BC, Rapture, Rhythm and the Tree of Life: Emily Carr and her Contemporaries, December 7, 2019 to June 2020
- Griffin Arts Projects, "Whose Chinatown?" January 29, 2021, to May 1, 2021

== Collections ==
- Buckingham Palace
- Canada House, London
- Imperial War Museum
- Diefenbaker Museum
- Vancouver Art Gallery
- West Vancouver Memorial Library

== Awards ==
Bainbridge received the Order of British Columbia in 1993.

== Publications ==
=== Artists' books ===
- Songs of Seton (1975–76)
- Lullaby of Lillooet (1977)
- The Madonna of the Weeping Willow Tree and Other Moods (date unknown)

=== Group exhibition catalogue ===
- Seymour Art Gallery: A North Shore Beginning (1990)
