= Gurdev Singh Gill (physician) =

Indian-born Canadian physician (1931–2023)

Gurdev Singh Gill OBC
- Born: 28 November 1931; Kharoudi, Punjab Province, British India
- Died: 17 December 2023 (aged 92); Chandigarh, India
- Occupation: Physician
- Honours: Order of British Columbia (1990); Queen Elizabeth II Diamond Jubilee Medal (2012)

Gurdev Singh Gill OBC (28 November 1931 – 17 December 2023) was an Indian-born Canadian physician, community leader, and activist. He was recognized as Canada's first medical doctor of Indian origin. As a community advocate, he furthered many issues relevant to the Indo-Canadian community.

Gill received the Order of British Columbia in 1990, and the Queen Elizabeth II Diamond Jubilee Medal in 2012, in recognition of his services.

== Early life ==
Gurdev Singh Gill was born on 28 November 1931 in Kharoudi, a village in the state of Punjab Province, British India, to Gurbachan and Dilbag Singh Gill. He had three siblings. Gill came to North America in 1949, first landing in Pasadena, California where his grandfather was, and later traveling to Seattle in a train. He then went to Duncan on Vancouver Island where his father lived, by ferry. He first worked in a paper mill. After completing grade 12, he enrolled in the University of British Columbia's medical school. There, he co-founded the East India Student Association and also served as the group's first secretary. In 1957, he became the first Indo-Canadian to graduate from the school.

== Career ==
Gill started his own practice in New Westminster, British Columbia, after graduating from UBC's medical school. In doing so, became the first South Asian and Indian to practice medicine in Canada. In a career spanning over forty years, he also served as a staff member at many hospitals in the region including St. Mary's, Royal Columbian Hospital, and the Queen's Park Care Center.

Gill was also the founder of the East Indian Welfare Society, where he advocated on issues of the Indo-Canadian community, including support for various family reunification efforts and the recognition of foreign educational credentials. He also served as the president of the Khalsa Diwan Society in Vancouver and led the fundraising efforts for relocating the society's Gurdwara from Kitsilano to its new location in Ross Street in Vancouver. He was a founding member of the Indo-Canadian Friendship Society which led village improvement projects in Punjab, India, including set up of waste water treatment plants, enabling access to safe drinking water, and providing local schools with computers.

Gill's received the Order of British Columbia in 1990 in its inaugural year, making him the first Indo-Canadian to receive this honour. Some of the other recipients of that inaugural year included musician Bryan Adams and businessman Jim Pattison. He received the Queen Elizabeth II Diamond Jubilee Medal in 2012. In addition, he also received UBC's Global Citizenship Alumni Achievement Award in 2013, and the UBC MAA Wallace Wilson Leadership Award in 2018.

== Personal life and death ==
Gill married Narinder Kaur in 1958. The couple had two children. He later married Jasinder Kaur after his first wife's death. He had four grandchildren and one great-grandson.

Gill died in Chandigarh, India, on 17 December 2023, at the age of 92.
