= Lakehead University =

University in Ontario, Canada

- Motto: Ad augusta per angusta
- Motto in English: Achievement through effort
- Type: Public university
- Established: Lakehead University 1965; Lakehead Technical Institute 1946
- Academic affiliations: COU, CUSID, UArctic, Universities Canada
- Endowment: $31.14 million
- Chancellor: Rita Deverell
- President: Gillian Siddall
- Provost: David Barnett
- Faculty: 319 (full time)
- Administrative staff: 2,250
- Students: 6,729 (2017)
- Undergraduates: 5,838 (2017)
- Postgraduates: 891 (2017)
- Location: Thunder Bay and Orillia, Ontario, Canada; 48°25′17″N 89°15′38″W
- Campus: Rural/suburban
- Colours: Cobalt & blaze
- Nickname: Lakehead Thunderwolves
- Sporting affiliations: U Sports, OUA
- Mascot: The Thunderwolf
- Website: lakeheadu.ca

Lakehead University is a public research university with campuses in Thunder Bay and Orillia, Ontario, Canada. Lakehead University, shortened to 'Lakehead U', is non-denominational and provincially supported. It has undergraduate programs, graduate programs, the Bora Laskin Faculty of Law, the only internationally accredited (AACSB) business school in northern Ontario, and is home to the western campus of the Northern Ontario School of Medicine.

Lakehead has more than 45,000 alumni. The main campus in Thunder Bay has about 7,900 students. As of September 2006, a new permanent extension campus in Orillia, located about 150 kilometres (93 mi) north of Toronto, has about 1,400 students.

== History ==
Lakehead University evolved from Lakehead Technical Institute and Lakehead College of Arts, Science, and Technology. Lakehead Technical Institute was established in response to a brief that outlined the need for an institution of higher education in northwestern Ontario. It was established on June 4, 1946, by an Order-in-Council of the Province of Ontario. Classes commenced in January 1948, in temporary rented quarters in downtown Port Arthur. In September of that same year, the first university courses were added to the curriculum.

Lakehead College of Arts, Science and Technology was established by an Act of the Ontario Legislature, proclaimed on August 1, 1957. Years later, the original Lakehead College of Arts, Science and Technology Act was amended to grant the college authority to establish new faculties, and confer degrees in arts and sciences.

The Lakehead University Act was given royal assent on June 22, 1965, and came into force on July 1, 1965. The Lakehead College of Arts, Science and Technology, thereafter known as "Lakehead University", was continued under this new charter. The first degrees were conferred on May 5, 1965. The first university chancellor was Senator Norman McLeod Paterson.

== Campuses ==
=== Thunder Bay campus ===
The original college site comprised about 32 hectares of land in south-west Port Arthur, Ontario. From 1962 to 1965, an additional 87 hectares of adjoining land was purchased in anticipation of future expansion. The first building was opened in 1957.

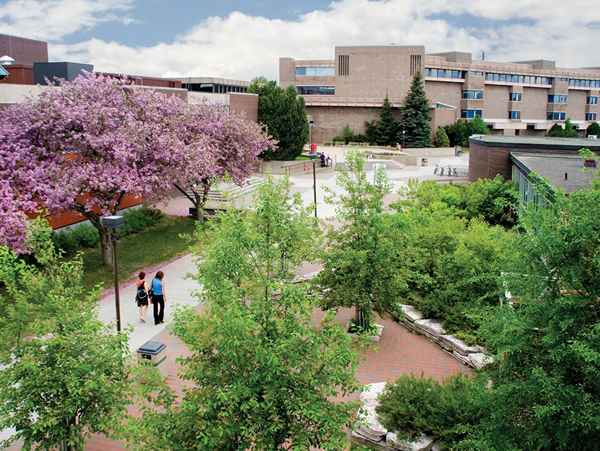
Centennial Building

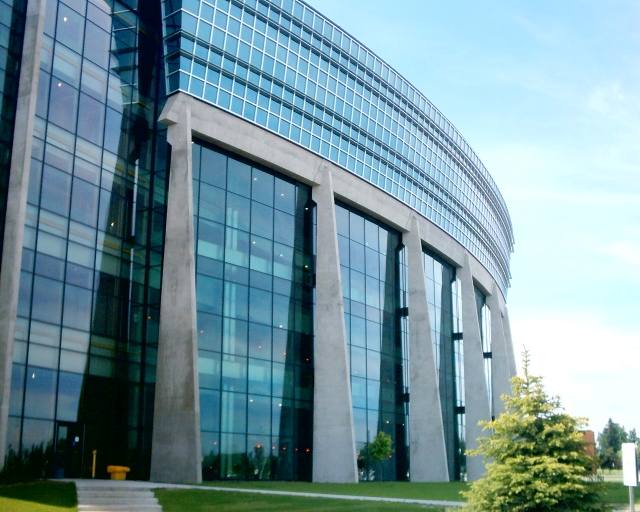
Advanced Technology & Academic Centre.

In 2005 the Northern Ontario School of Medicine (NOSM) was formed as a joint initiative between Lakehead University and Laurentian University in Sudbury organized within the Faculty of Medicine of both Laurentian (East Campus) and Lakehead (West Campus) universities. The medical school has multiple teaching and research sites across Northern Ontario, including large and small communities. Students are given a choice of attending either one of the two main NOSM campuses. NOSM is the only Canadian medical school to be established as a stand-alone not-for-profit corporation, with its own Board of Directors and corporation bylaws.

A new law school was established; the faculty accepted its first students in 2013. The program is housed in the former Port Arthur Collegiate Institute. In 2014 it was named the Bora Laskin Faculty of Law, after the fourteenth Chief Justice of Canada.

Lakehead University's physical plant now consists of 39 buildings and 116 hectares of property including 40 hectares of landscaped and maintained grounds.

=== Orillia campus ===
Lakehead University opened a campus at Heritage Place in Downtown Orillia in 2006. During the first semester, there were about 100 students.

In September 2010 the university expanded to its new 500 University Avenue location. A new academic building at this site represents the first phase in the development of Canada's first Leadership in Energy and Environmental Design (LEED) Platinum university campus. A 271-bed student residence building and a cafeteria/bookstore facility opened in November 2012 at the University Avenue site. Lakehead Orillia now has over 1,200 students studying at the Heritage Place and University Avenue sites. Undergraduate programs are offered at the 500 University Avenue site, while the professional year of Lakehead Orillia's education programs are offered at the downtown campus.

=== Residence ===
Accommodations at Lakehead are divided into three living styles: residence halls, apartments and townhouses. The Thunder Bay residence currently has a total of 1,196 beds and three cafeteria/dining halls. Students can choose from meal options that range from kitchenette, full-kitchen and complete meal plan depending on the residence styles.

The men's residence for 52 students was opened in fall of 1962, and has grown to include a residence village consisting of 10 new buildings. The village is situated on the banks of the McIntyre River within five-minute walking distance of all university buildings and athletic facilities.

From 1989 to 1992, a complex of townhouses, including some handicap accessible units, was added to the residence facility.

A 271-bed residence in Orillia opened its doors in late Fall 2012. The Orillia residence has two meal plan options for students, with food services operated by Dana Hospitality since 2021.

=== Agricultural Research Station ===
The university supports a research station near Thunder Bay to test newly developed crop varieties. The station had been in operation for a number of years, and was officially taken over by the university in 2018.

The Orillia campus hosts 'The Farm Lab' which is a 'micro' model agroecological farm and school garden program for hands-on, experiential, place-based education. With a focus on science and other curriculum subjects, it aims to grow a more healthy, sustainable and just food system for the community. Run mostly with students and volunteers from the community, it also invites elementary and high school class trips to experience growing food, harvesting and seed-saving.

== Academic organization ==
University rankings

World rankings
- ARWU World: 901–1000
- THE World: 801–1000
- USNWR World: 1291

Canadian rankings
- THE National: 28–30
- USNWR National: 30
- Maclean's Undergraduate: 5

The university has nine faculties: Business Administration, Education, Engineering, Natural Resources Management, Faculty of Health and Behavioral Sciences, Science and Environmental Studies, Social Sciences and Humanities, Medicine, and Graduate Studies. The Faculty of Law welcomed its first students in September 2013.

Based on full-time undergraduate enrolment, the Social Sciences & Humanities is the largest faculty at Lakehead, with about 30% of the students, followed by Health and Behavioral Sciences, Science & Environmental Studies, Engineering, Education, and Business Administration. Two small faculties are Natural Resources Management and Medicine, each with less than 2% of the student enrolment.

=== Aboriginal ===
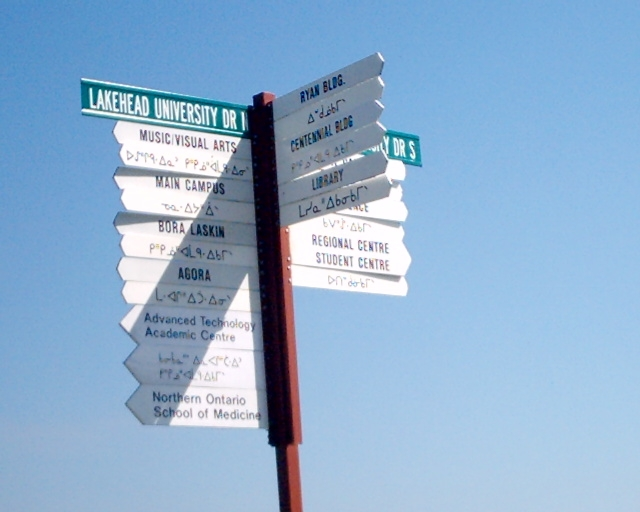
A bilingual sign. The languages are English and Anishinaabe.

As a percentage of total student population, Lakehead University has one of the largest aboriginal student communities in Canada. The university has a governing board with senate policies along with Aboriginal-governed councils within its university governance structure. Lakehead also offers Aboriginal support including the Office of Aboriginal Initiatives. Special first-year bridging programs for Aboriginal students are provided. Tutoring services are available within Lakehead's Native Nursing Access Program. There is also the Superior Science Program which goes to remote Aboriginal communities. Lakehead has Canada's only Department of Aboriginal Education to foster Native Language instruction and prepare teachers to meet the needs of Aboriginal students and communities.

=== Scholarships and bursaries ===
Lakehead University scholarships for Aboriginal, First Nations and Métis students include: Hamlin Family Fund Nursing Bursaries; Hamlin Family Fund Bursary; Hamlin Family Fund Native Bursary; Lakehead University Native Award; TBayTel Bursary.

Apart from these awards, Lakehead University provides entrance scholarships to high school students with marks above 80%, paid out during four years of undergraduate. Lakehead also offers free tuition to students with a 95% average or higher.

=== Arctic research ===
Lakehead University is an active member of the University of the Arctic. UArctic is an international cooperative network based in the Circumpolar Arctic region, consisting of more than 200 universities, colleges, and other organizations with an interest in promoting education and research in the Arctic region.

The university participates in UArctic's mobility program north2north. The aim of that program is to enable students of member institutions to study in different parts of the North.

== Student life ==
Demographics of student body (2015–16)
	Undergraduate	Graduate
Male	34.3%	31.8%
Female	65.7%	68.2%
Canadian student	95.6%	71.7%
International student	4.4%	28.3%

Lakehead University Student Union, or LUSU, serves as a governing body for student-run clubs. Students can participate in various club activities, ranging from student government to multi-cultural and athletics. LUSU is also responsible for publishing The Argus, the student newspaper, as well as running The Study Coffeehouse and The Outpost Pub, sites that often serve as gathering places for campus community activities and as performance venues.

=== Athletics ===
Lakehead's Thunder Bay campus has two main athletic facilities known as the Fieldhouse and the Hangar. The Fieldhouse contains a main gymnasium, weight room, yoga room, 50-meter swimming pool and change-room facilities. The Hangar has a 200-meter indoor track, soccer field, cardio area, aerobic studio and a climbing wall. Lakehead University is represented in the Canadian U Sports league by the Lakehead Thunderwolves. Varsity teams include: Basketball, Cross-Country, Hockey, Nordic Skiing, Track & Field, Volleyball, and Wrestling. It also has club teams, including Men's Volleyball, men's and women's curling, and rowing.

== Notable faculty ==
- Andrew Donald Booth, early computer scientist, President of Lakehead University from 1972 to 1978
- Kathleen Booth, early computer scientist, inventor of the first computer assembly language
- Dave Siciliano, athletic director and coach of Lakehead Nor'Westers men's ice hockey from 1975 to 1980
- Geoffrey R. Weller, Vice-President of Lakehead University and founding President of the University of Northern British Columbia

== Notable alumni ==
- Shandor Alphonso – NHL official
- Jan Cameron – Australian swimmer and coach
- Melissa Coates – professional wrestler
- Ronald J. Duhamel – former member of parliament, senator
- Jim Foulds – former Ontario MPP
- Patty Hajdu – member of parliament, Thunder Bay – Superior North; and minister
- Bruce Hyer – former member of parliament, Thunder Bay – Superior North
- Anthony LeBlanc – sports executive, former president, CEO, and alternate governor of the Arizona Coyotes, former vice president of global sales for BlackBerry
- Stephen Low – IMAX film maker, Director
- Eric Melillo – MP, Kenora, who was elected at the age of 21, in 2019, immediately after finishing his BA
- Dusty Miller, OOnt – politician and first female mayor of the City of Thunder Bay
- Lyn McLeod, OOnt – Canadian politician, former leader of the Ontario Liberal Party, former provincial Cabinet Minister (multiple portfolios)
- Roy Piovesana – archivist, historian, musician, teacher
- Gary Polonsky – founding president and vice-chancellor, University of Ontario Institute of Technology
- Diane Schoemperlen – novelist
- David Shannon, CM, OOnt – Canadian disability/human rights activist, lawyer, politician, actor, university lecturer, author, and adventurer
- Dave Siciliano – ice hockey coach and player
- Don Talbot – Australian swimming coach

== See also ==
- List of Ontario Universities
- Ontario Student Assistance Program
- Higher education in Ontario
- Canadian Interuniversity Sport
- Canadian government scientific research organizations
- Canadian university scientific research organizations
- Canadian industrial research and development organizations
