= Wheel-Trans =

Paratransit system in Toronto, Ontario

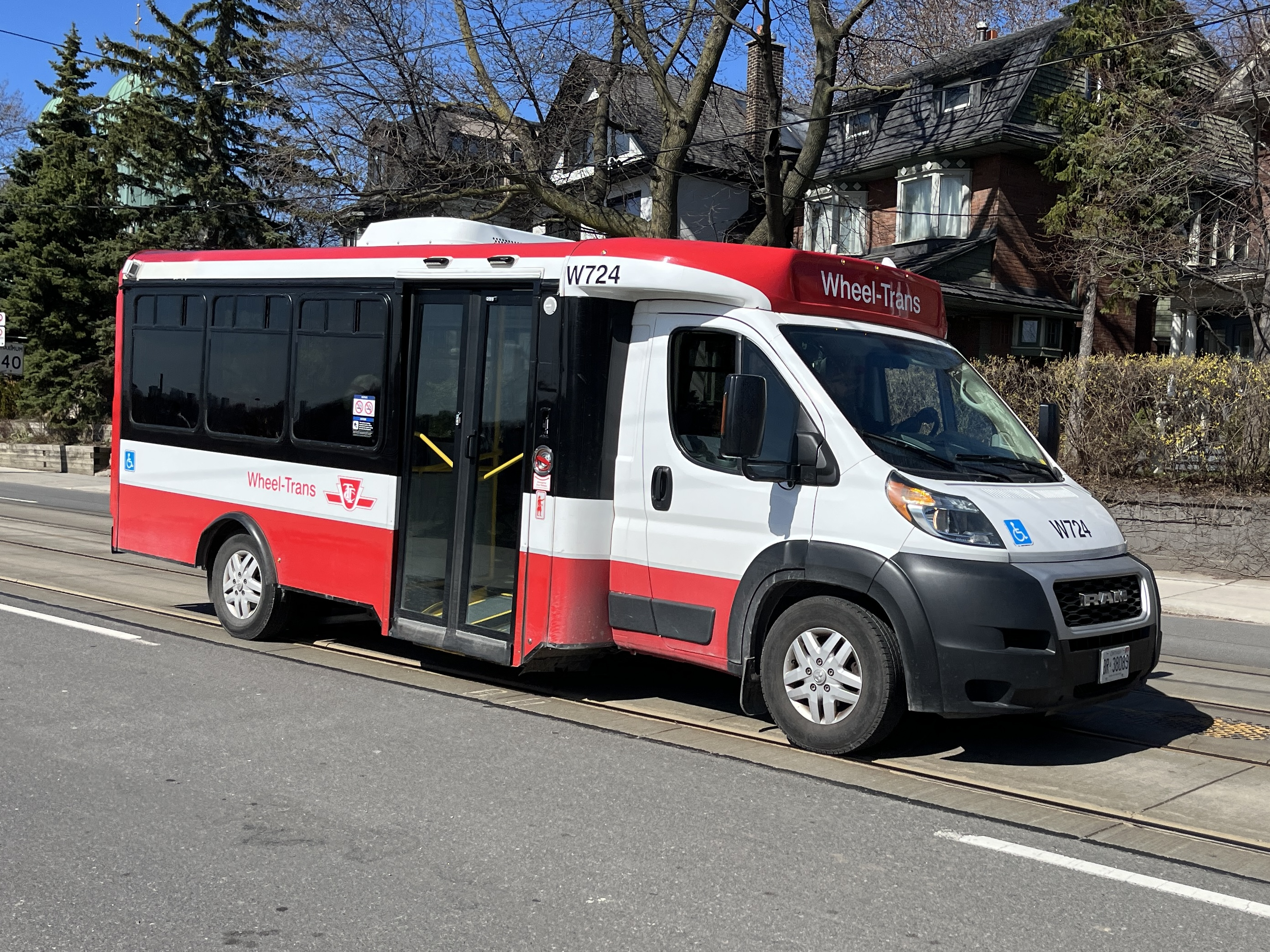
- Ram ProMaster CS-2 Minibus in 2026
- Parent: Toronto Transit Commission
- Founded: 1975; 51 years ago
- Headquarters: Lakeshore Bus Garage
- Service area: Toronto (city proper), Toronto Pearson International Airport
- Service type: Door-to-door paratransit
- Website: Wheel-Trans

Wheel-Trans is a paratransit system in Toronto, Ontario, Canada, provided by the Toronto Transit Commission (TTC). It provides specialized door-to-door accessible transit services for persons with physical and mental disabilities using its fleet of accessible minibuses or contracted accessible taxis. Users must register with the TTC who will typically grant access to those with permanent disabilities or temporary use for people with temporary disabilities, or show difficulty in traveling short distances. Wheel-Trans provides service mainly within the city of Toronto, but will travel up to one kilometre (0.62 mi) into neighbouring regions, and accepts the regular TTC fare.

== History ==
Wheel-Trans was born out of an initiative by the Trans-Action Coalition, a group led by Beryl Potter lobbying for transit accessibility in Toronto. The paratransit system was officially created in 1975 as a two-year pilot project contracted to Wheelchair Mobile and operated on behalf of Metropolitan Toronto and the province of Ontario until 1976. Only individuals using wheelchairs were accepted as the original 46 users of the pilot project, and rode at no cost. In 1977 the service was contracted to All-Way Transportation Corporation of Toronto before being taken over by the TTC in 1985.

== Operations ==
=== Service provision ===
Service is provided by accessible buses and contracted accessible taxi mini-vans. Wheel-Trans is a door-to-door service. Rides can be reserved up to one week in advance by calling the reservation line, by using the automated Ride-Line touch-tone phone service or by using the recently launched Wheel-Trans Online Trip Booking website.

=== Fleet ===
Wheel-Trans buses operates as part of the main TTC fleet but do not include wheelchair accessible buses from the regular fleet.

=== Contracts ===
Most of Wheel-Trans operations are provided by the TTC, but some of the services are contracted out to private operators.

==== Able Atlantic Taxi ====
Make/model	Description	# passengers	Year acquired	Year retired	Notes
Chrysler Caravan	Converted van	2			Disabled access

==== Beck Taxi ====
Make/model	Description	# passengers	Year acquired	Year retired	Notes
Chevrolet Uplander	Converted van	4	1998	June, 2011	Disabled access
Chevrolet Venture	Converted van	4	1998	June, 2011	Disabled access
Dodge Grand Caravan	Converted Van	4	1997		TTL Vehicle
Toyota Sienna	Converted Van	4	2005		TTL Vehicle
Ford Transit Connect	Modified Vehicle	5 (Includes Wheelchair)	2015		TTL Vehicle
Plymouth Voyager	Converted Van	5	1996	November, 2002	Disabled access
Toyota Camry	Sedan	4	2007		Non-wheelchair accessible (Canes and walkers)
MV-1 (Mobility-Vehicle 1)	Minivan	2 (Wheelchairs)	2013		TTL Vehicle or used as a Wheel-Trans contracted vehicle.
Toyota Corolla	Sedan	4	2015		Non-wheelchair accessible (Canes and walkers)
Ford Crown Victoria	Sedan	4	1994	2008	Limited fleet. Cab drivers may not acquire this vehicle for service - Non-wheelchair accessible (Canes and walkers)

==== Royal Taxi ====
Make/model	Description	# passengers	Year acquired	Year retired	Notes
Dodge Grand Caravan Sport	Converted van	2		Used as TTL vehicle or for Wheel-Trans contracted taxicabs.	Disabled access
Pontiac Montana	Converted van	2		Retired - Toronto Municipal Licensing and Standards no longer allow this vehicle in service, as it does not meet requirements to operate as a taxicab.	Disabled access
Chevrolet Venture	Converted van	2		All vehicles in fleet retired as of April 8, 2009. This vehicle may not enter service as it does not meet requirements to operate as a taxicab.	Disabled access
Ford Crown Victoria	Sedan	4	1996	2008	Toronto Municipal Licensing and Standards no longer allow this vehicle in service, as it does not meet requirements to operate as a taxicab. - Non-wheelchair accessible.

==== Scarboro City Cab ====
Make/model	Description	# passengers	Year acquired	Year retired	Notes
Dodge Grand Caravan Sport	Converted van	2			Disabled access

==== Toronto Para Transit ====
Make/model	Description	# passengers	Year acquired	Year retired	Notes
Chevrolet Venture-Kino Maxi Shuttle	Converted van	2			Disabled access
Chrysler Caravan	Converted van	2			Disabled access

==== Wheelchair Taxi ====
Make/model	Description	# passengers	Year acquired	Year retired	Notes
Ford E350 minibus	Converted van	~3			Disabled access
Chrysler Caravan	Converted van	2			Disabled access
Chrysler Sprinter van	Converted van	2			Disabled access
Ford Transit Connect	Converted van	4	2014		Disabled access

== Accessibility outside of Wheel-Trans ==
As for 2017, all 1,869 buses are low floor to allow for easy accessible by mobility devices. While all subway trains are accessible, only 35 of the 69 stations have elevators. The Flexity Outlook streetcars are fully accessible. However, not all stops are easily accessible for customers in wheelchairs, particularly in winter.

== See also ==
- Transhelp - Peel Region from a variety of providers including Caledon Community Services Transportation
- York Region Transit Mobility Plus
