= Sophie Pierre =

Sophie Mae Pierre (born Eustace) OC OBC, is a Canadian First Nations chief and administrator. She served as the Commissioner for the British Columbia Treaty Commission from 2009 to 2015.

== Early life ==
Born in Cranbrook, British Columbia in 1951, she grew up on the St. Mary's Indian Reserve near the city. Pierre attended elementary school at the Kootenay Indian Residential School, located in the St. Eugene Mission, which was part of the Canadian residential school system. She attended public high school in Cranbrook, but dropped out at age 17 to get married. After separating from her husband five years later, Pierre finished her high-school diploma and moved to Victoria with her two children. There she studied business administration at Camosun College, after which she returned to St. Mary's to work in the band administration.She played an important part in helping the Ktunaxa community in British Columbia with an initiative of transforming the St-Eugene residential school into a source of prosperity and opportunities for the Ktunaxa people.

== Career ==
In the 1970s, Pierre was involved in the formation of the Ktunaxa Kinbasket Tribal Council. She served her first term on the St. Mary's Band council in 1979, and would go to serve for 30 years, 25 as chief of the band. She served on the board of the College of the Rockies from 1990 to 1993, and was named to the Order Of British Columbia in 1994. Pierre was appointed as Chief Commissioner of BC Treaty Commission in 2009, which examines First Nations land claim issues in the province. On June 30, 2016, Pierre was named an Officer of the Order of Canada for "her role in the British Columbia treaty process and for her commitment to the economic development of First Nations."

== St-Eugene transformation project ==
St-Eugene residential school, which opened up in 1912, was in activity for about 58 years, and many elders in the Ktunaxa community have experienced horrible treatment there. Sophie Mae Pierre was one of them, attending the school for nine years, from when she was six years old until she was fifteen years. St-Eugene was then abandoned after it was closed in 1970, but the question of what should become the building came back in the late '90s. She led the campaign to transform it into an economic tool for the First Nations of the region. With the council, she had to convince each of the five communities to back the project to get the support needed at the referendums." In about two years, many discussions happened between the council and the people, mostly with elders who wanted the building knocked down because of the traumas there lived there. Pierre, with the help of the council, was able to obtain the support of the five communities and the project was then approved. In 2000, a golf course was opened in the ex-residential school site, followed by a casino in 2001 and an hotel in 2003. These new businesses quickly became a source of wealth for them. It offered jobs for a lot of unemployed members of the community, as well as visibility for the Ktunaxa nation in all of Canada. This project help the economy in the region and allowed many to relieve their financial problems while staying on the land of the Ktunaxa nation, mixing modern needs and respect of traditions.
