= Order of British Columbia =

Civilian honour for merit in Canada

- Insignia of the Order of British Columbia

Awarded by the lieutenant governor of British Columbia
- Type: Order of merit (provincial)
- Established: 21 April 1989
- Eligibility: All living persons except politicians while in office
- Awarded for: Service with the greatest distinction in any field benefiting the people of British Columbia or elsewhere
- Status: Currently constituted
- Founder: David Lam
- Chancellor: Wendy Lisogar-Cocchia
- Grades: Member
- Post-nominals: OBC

Statistics
- Total inductees: 515

Precedence
- Next (higher): Order of Ontario
- Next (lower): Alberta Order of Excellence
- Ribbon bar of the order

The Order of British Columbia (Note: French: Ordre de la Colombie-Britannique) is a civilian honour for merit in the Canadian province of British Columbia. Instituted in 1989 by Lieutenant Governor David Lam, on the advice of the Cabinet under Premier Bill Vander Zalm, the order is administered by the Governor-in-Council and is intended to honour current or former British Columbia residents for conspicuous achievements in any field, being thus described as the highest honour amongst all others conferred by the British Columbia Crown.

== Structure and appointment ==
The Order of British Columbia, which evolved out of and replaced the earlier Order of the Dogwood, is intended to honour any current or former longtime resident of British Columbia who has demonstrated a high level of individual excellence and achievement in any field, demonstrating the "greatest distinction and excell[ence] in any field of endeavour benefiting the people of the Province or elsewhere." Only those who are elected or appointed members of a governmental body are ineligible as long as they hold office. There are no limits on how many can belong to the order or be inducted at one time.

The process of finding qualified individuals begins with submissions from the public to the Order of British Columbia's advisory council, which consists of the Chief Justice of British Columbia, who serves as the chair; the Speaker of the Legislative Assembly; a president, in turn, of one of British Columbia's public universities, for a two-year term; the President of the Union of British Columbia Municipalities; the Deputy Minister of Intergovernmental Relations; and two Members of the order. This committee then meets once yearly to make its selected recommendations to the lieutenant governor. Posthumous nominations are not accepted, though an individual who dies after his or her name was submitted to the advisory council can still be retroactively made a Member of the Order of British Columbia. The lieutenant governor, ex officio a Member and the Chancellor of the Order of British Columbia, then makes all appointments into the fellowship's single grade of membership by an Order in Council that bears the viceroyal sign-manual and the Great Seal of the province; thereafter, the new Members are entitled to use the post-nominal letters OBC.

== Insignia ==
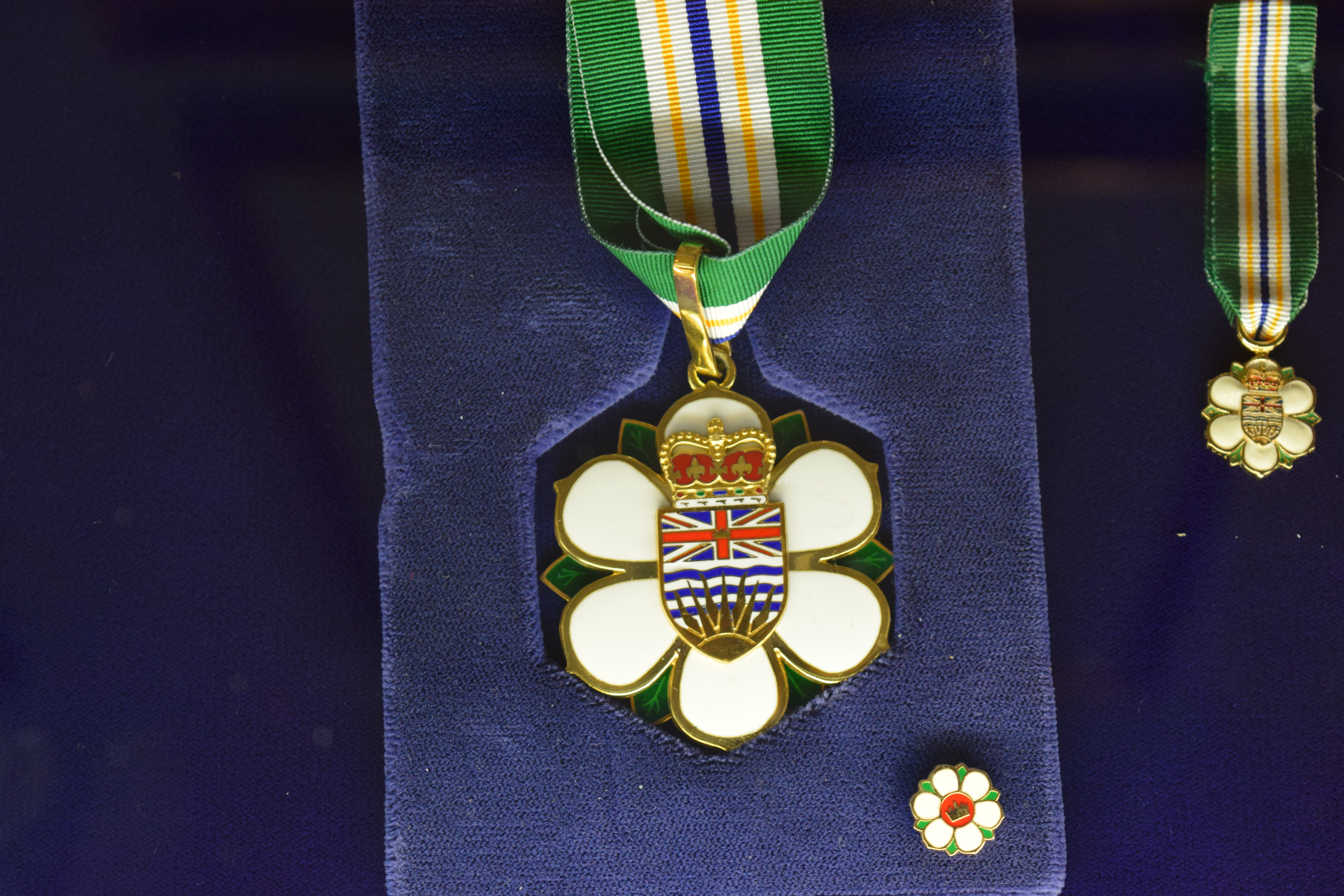
The full-size insignia, shown here with a miniature medal (at right) and lapel pin

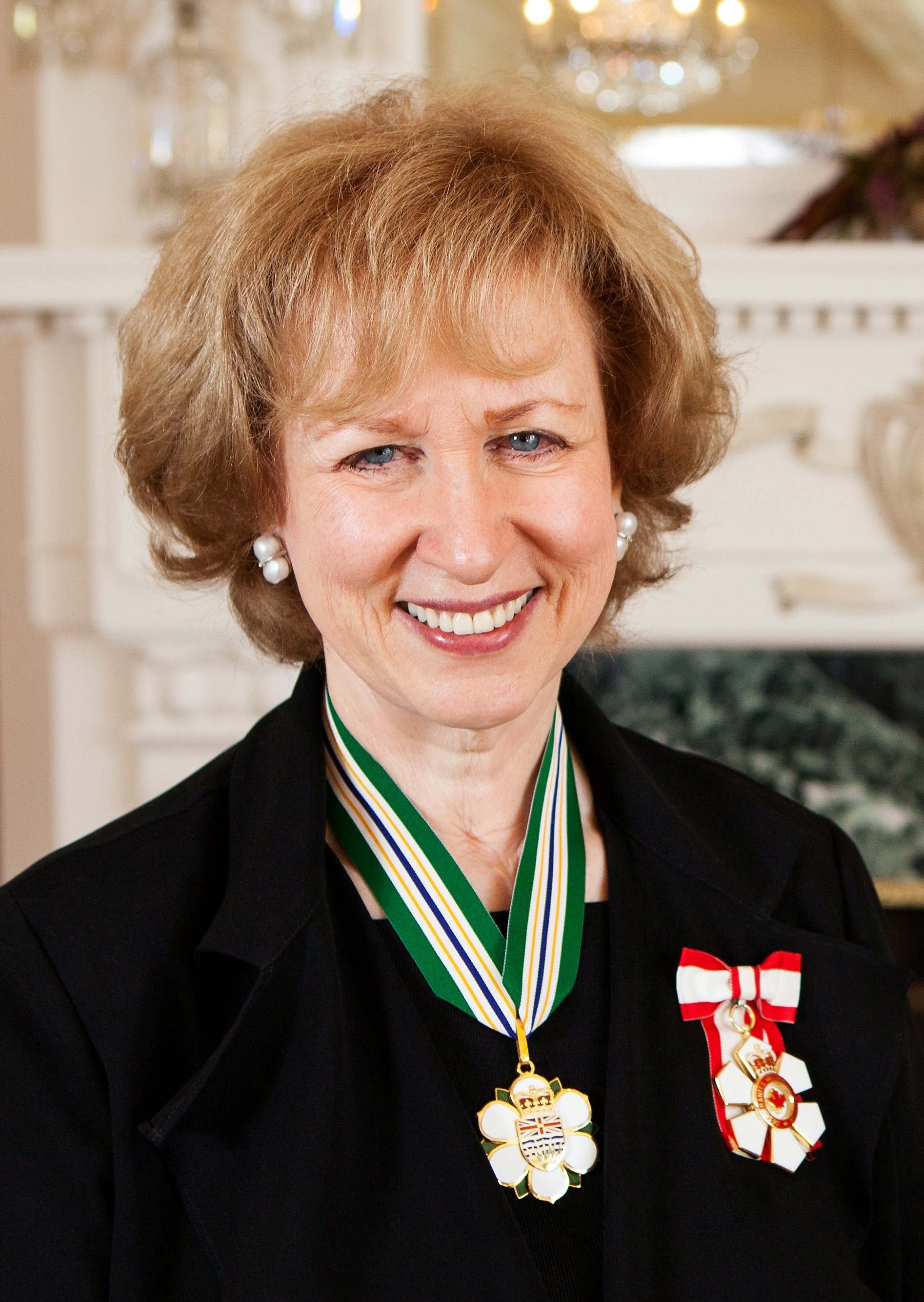
Former prime minister Kim Campbell wearing the insignia of the Order of British Columbia on a neck ribbon

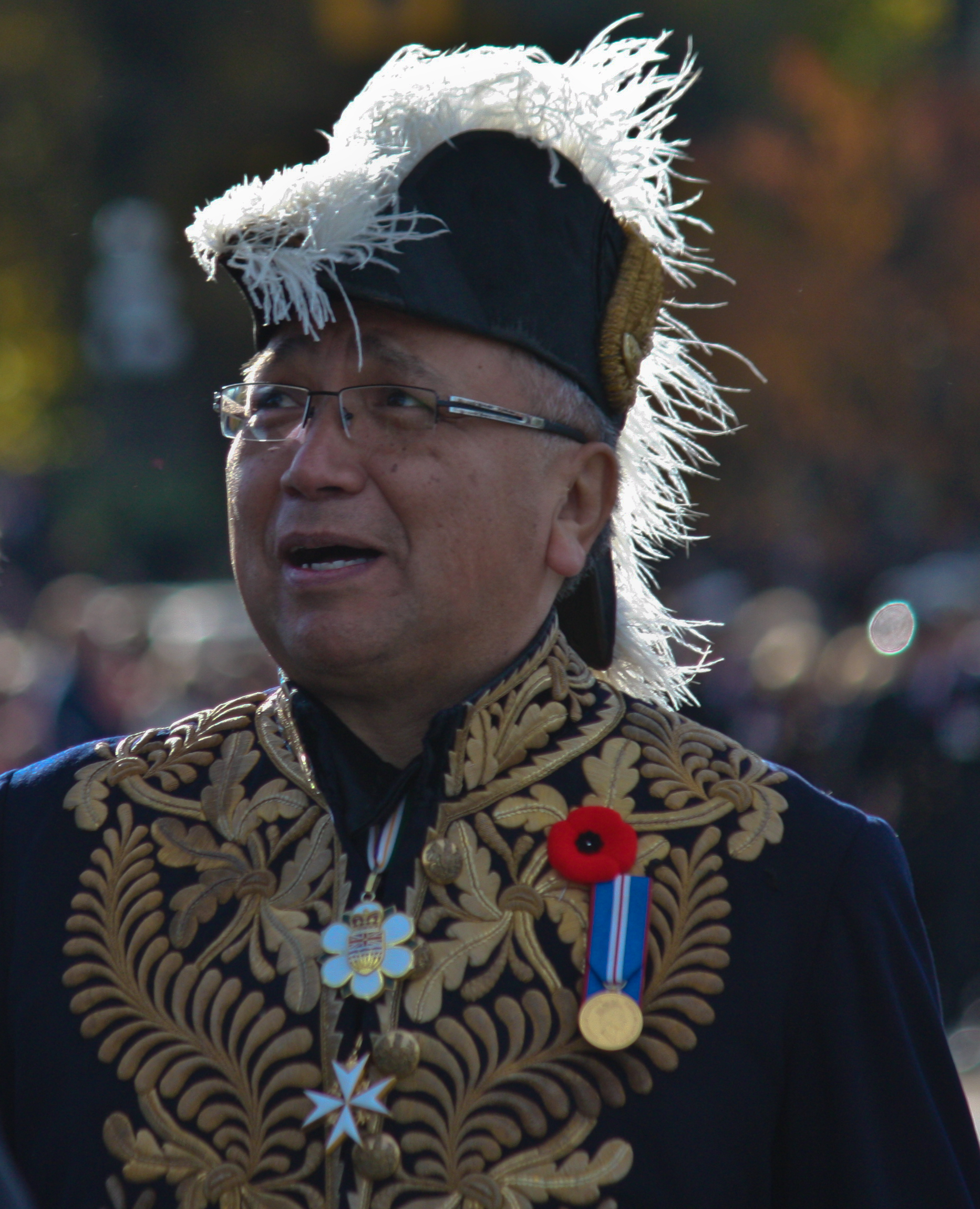
Steven Point, Lieutenant Governor of British Columbia from 2007 to 2012, wearing the insignia of the Order of British Columbia at centre top (which is actually in the incorrect order of precedence)

Upon admission into the Order of British Columbia, in a ceremony held at Government House in Victoria, new Members are presented with the order's insignia. The main badge consists of a gold medallion in the form of a stylized flower of the Pacific Dogwood—the official provincial flower—with the obverse in white enamel with gold edging, and bearing at its centre the escutcheon of the arms of British Columbia, all surmounted by a St. Edward's Crown symbolizing the Canadian monarch's role as the fount of honour. The ribbon is patterned with vertical stripes in green, white, blue, and gold, reflecting the colours within the provincial coat of arms; men wear the medallion suspended from this ribbon at the collar, while women carry theirs on a ribbon bow at the left chest. Members will also receive for wear on casual clothing a lapel pin, appearing as a smaller enamel Dogwood flower capped by a crown.

== Inductees ==
This is a partial list of notable members of the Order of British Columbia:

- Bryan Guy Adams OC OBC, Grammy Award winning musician and photographer, appointed 1990
- Unity Bainbridge, artist and poet, appointed 1993
- Michael Conway Baker OBC, composer, appointed 1997
- Geoffrey Ballard CM OBC, geophysicist and businessman, appointed 2003
- Dave Barrett OBC, BC's first NDP Premier, appointed 2012
- Brigadier Henry Pybus Bell-Irving OC DSO OBE OBC ED CD, Lieutenant Governor of British Columbia, appointed 1990
- Leon Bibb, musician and actor, appointed 2009
- Peter M. Brown OBC, financier, appointed 2003
- Frank Arthur Calder OC OBC, first aboriginal Canadian elected to any Canadian legislature, appointed 2004
- Gordon Campbell OBC, three-term Premier of British Columbia, appointed 2011
- Raffi Cavoukian CM OBC, children's entertainer, appointed 2001
- Shushma Datt, Radio and television broadcaster, appointed 1992
- Frankie Edroff OBC MSC, philanthropist, appointed 2010
- Sam Feldman OBC, music executive, appointed 2023
- Lance Finch OBC, Q.C., former Chief Justice of British Columbia, appointed 2017
- David Foster OC OBC, Grammy Award winning musician and record executive, appointed 1995
- Lori Fung Methorst CM OBC, Olympic gymnast, appointed 1990
- Garde Basil Gardom OBC QC, Lieutenant Governor of British Columbia, appointed 2002
- Paul George OBC, Environmentalist, appointed 2020
- Gordon Gibson OBC, politician, columnist, and author, appointed 2008
- Gurdev Singh Gill, OBC, Physician, appointed 1990
- Nancy Catherine Greene OC OBC OD, Senator and Olympic alpine skier, appointed 2004
- Richard M. Hansen CC OBC, paraplegic athlete and activist, appointed 1990
- Walter Hardwick OBC, teacher and deputy minister of education, appointed 1997
- Tara Singh Hayer OBC, Indo Canadian Newspaper publisher, appointed 1995
- Bonnie Henry OBC, Provincial Health Officer, appointed 2021
- Bob Hindmarch CM OBC Professor and ice hockey coach, appointed 2010
- Edward John Hughes CM OBC, artist, appointed 2005
- Robert Joseph, OBC, Hereditary Chief of the Gwawaenuk First Nation, and Ambassador for Reconciliation Canada, appointed 2015
- Douglas Jung CM OBC CD, first Chinese Canadian federal Member of Parliament, appointed 1997
- Edgar Kaiser Jr.
- Kathy Kinloch, businesswoman, appointed 2022
- Mary Kitagawa OBC, educator, appointed 2018
- Joy Kogawa CM OBC, author and poet, appointed 2006
- Diana Jean Krall OC OBC, jazz musician, appointed 2000
- David Lam, OC CVO OBC, Lieutenant-Governor of BC, appointed 1995
- Peter Anthony Larkin OC OBC FRSC, fisheries scientist, appointed 1996
- Robert H. Lee OC OBC, real estate executive and philanthropist, appointed 1990
- Robert Italo Lenarduzzi OBC, coach of Canadian Olympic and national soccer teams, appointed 2005
- Trevor Linden CM OBC, professional hockey player, appointed 2003
- Clarence Louie OBC, Chief of the Osoyoos Indian Band, appointed 2004
- Sarah Ann McLachlan OC OBC, musician, singer, and songwriter, appointed 2001
- Kenneth McVay OBC, internet activist, appointed 1995
- James Mavor Moore CC OBC, writer, producer, critic, and educator, appointed 1999
- Stephen John Nash OC OBC, National Basketball Association player, appointed 2006
- Wally Oppal OBC, Q.C., former Attorney General of British Columbia and Justice of British Columbia Court of Appeal, appointed 2017
- Sophie Pierre OBC, Chief of St. Mary's Indian Band and commissioner for the BC Treaty Commission, appointed 1994
- David R. Podmore OBC, co-founder of Concert Properties, appointed 2014
- Jack W. Poole OBC, co-founder of Concert Properties, appointed 2003
- Derek Porter-Nesbitt OBC, Olympic rower, appointed 1996
- Ryan Reynolds OBC, actor and producer, appointed 2023
- Christopher Duncan Rose OBC, teacher, school principal and school trustee, founder of the Chris Rose Therapy Centre for Autism, appointed 2010
- Martin Schechter OBC, HIV/AIDS scientist, appointed 1994
- Ernest Alvia Smith VC CM OBC CD, last living Canadian recipient of the Victoria Cross, appointed 2002
- Michael Smith OBC, UBC scientist and BC's first Nobel Prize winner, appointed 1994
- Arran Stephens OBC, co-founder of Nature's Path and philanthropist, appointed 2022
- Ratana Stephens OBC, co-founder of Nature's Path and philanthropist, appointed 2022
- Neil J. Sterritt, Gitxsan activist and author, appointed 2017
- David Takayoshi Suzuki CC OBC, environmentalist and science broadcaster, appointed 1995
- Tamara Taggart, former Canadian news anchor, appointed 2015
- Susan Tatoosh, Indigenous leader, appointed 2019
- Arthur Vickers (artist) OBC, artist, storyteller and philanthropist, appointed 2008
- Tamara Vrooman, OBC businesswoman
- Peter Wing CM OBC, first mayor of Chinese descent in North America, appointed 1990
- Brian Smith OBC QC, Attorney General of BC, chairman of CN Rail and BC Hydro, appointed 2016

=== Rescinded ===
- David Sidoo, CFL player, philanthropist, criminal (appointed in 2016; rescinded in 2020)

== See also ==
- Symbols of British Columbia
- Orders, decorations, and medals of the Canadian provinces
- Canadian honours order of wearing
