= Sudarshan Gautam =

Canadian Actor & Mountain Climber

Sudarshan Gautam (Nepali: सुदर्शन गौतम) is a Canadian mountain climber and actor. He is the first person without arms to have reached the summit of Mount Everest without the use of prosthetics, and did this on May 20, 2013. Gautam lost his arms as a result of an accident in his childhood. In 2014, he appeared in the Nepalese movie Himmatwali.

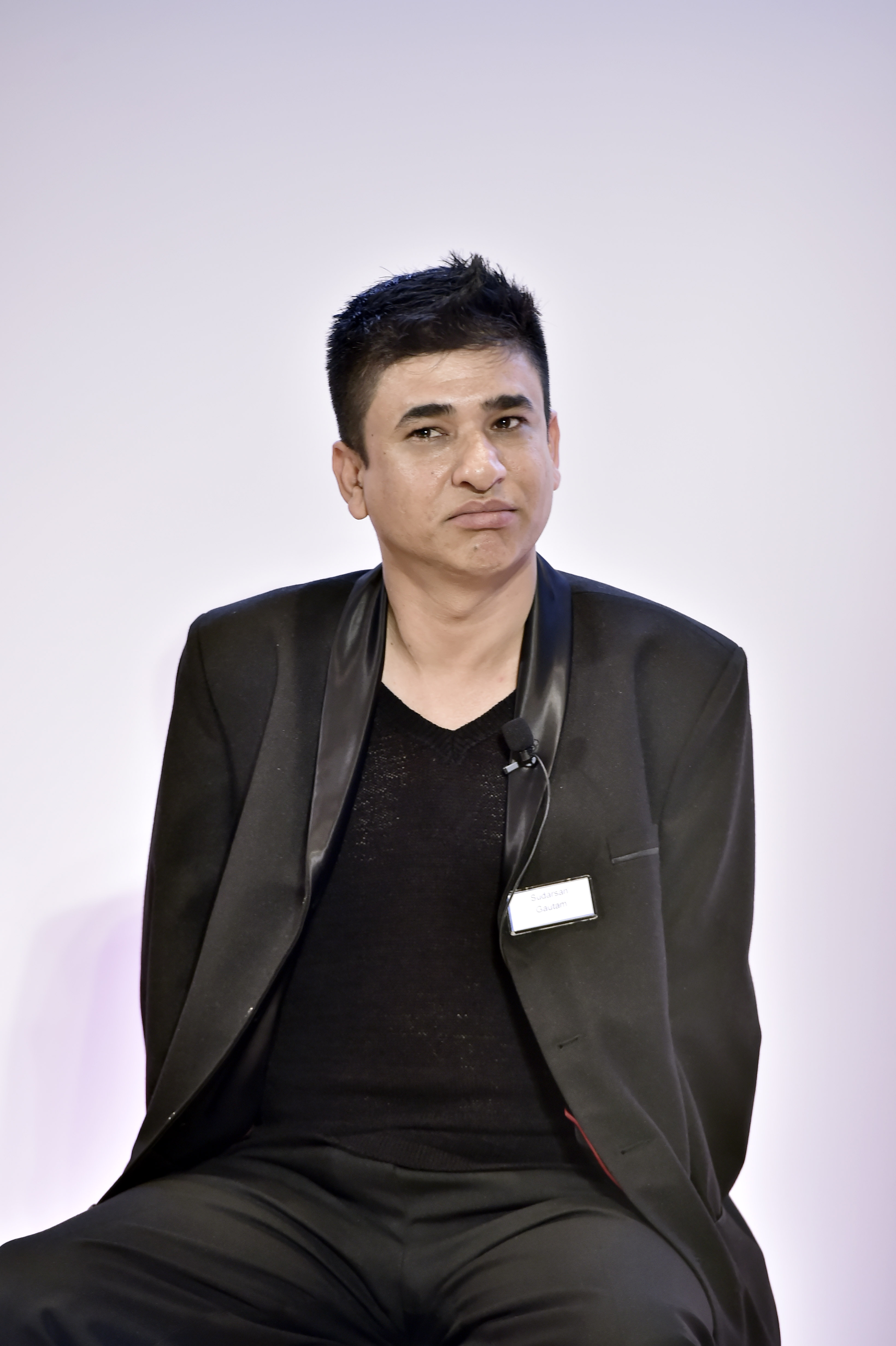
Gautam in 2017

== Life and education ==
Gautam was born in Gunsi Bhadaure, a village in Ramechhap District, Nepal. He was raised in Kathmandu, where an accident with a live power cable led to the amputation of both of his arms.

Gautam received a diploma in computer science using a non-modified computer with his feet. He received a master's degree from the Nepal Commerce Campus.

In 2007, Gautam became a Canadian citizen.

== Mountaineering ==
Prior to climbing Mount Everest, Gautam reached the peaks of Mount Ramdung (5,925 metres (19,439 ft)) and Mount Yala (5,732 metres (18,806 ft)).

On May 19, 2013, while descending from Mount Everest, Gautam required a high altitude helicopter rescue. Sudarshan Gautam is planning to climb Mt. Logan (Canadian Highest Mountain) in May 2024.

== Awards ==
On June 30, 2013, NRN-Canada, the national organization of Nepali Diaspora in Canada, honored Gautam as an outstanding Nepali Diaspora member. He was their brand ambassador from 2014 to 2016. In 2014, Gautam was received into the Canadian Disability Hall of Fame. In May 2017, he received a South Asian Canadian Trailblazers Award. In November 2017 Sudarshan Gautam has been chosen one of the ten Canadian for Toyota globel campion. He has also received a Compelling Calgarians Award.

== Acting ==
In 2014, Gautam appeared in the Nepali movie, Himmatwali ("a brave person") with Rekha Thapa. In January 2017, Gautam hosted the Nepali Film Fair in Canada. Sudarshan Gautam just signed X-9 Level 1 Nepali biggest action film in 2022 of Aug, and it will be releasing through Netflix next year.
