= York Region Transit Mobility Plus =

York Region Transit Mobility Plus, or Mobility Plus, is a paratransit service operated by York Region Transit (YRT) in York Region, Ontario, Canada, for the disabled using specially equipped minibuses.

== History ==
Mobility Plus was created in 2001 following the merger of the various transit agencies in York Region into YRT. Most of the mobility system was inherited from Vaughan Transit and Markham Transit (Mobility Bus and Taxi Scrip), who operated similar systems since the 1980s.

== Services ==
YRT Mobility Plus operates in a similar manner to the Toronto Transit Commission's (TTC) Wheel-Trans service and makes connections to other operators in Greater Toronto such as the TTC, Brampton Transit, Miway (Mississauga), Durham Region Transit, and GO Transit.

Fixed routes are the Community Bus routes, a concept borrowed from the Toronto Transit Commission's Wheel-Trans community routes:

- 520/521 Newmarket Community Bus
- 522 Markham Community Bus
- 589/590 Richmond Hill Community Bus

York Region Mobility Bus can operate service to and within Toronto bounded by Toronto-Mississauga boundary, Steeles Avenue West, Yonge Street and Highway 401. This is the case due to previous contract by Vaughan Transit.

== Fleet ==
YRT Mobility Plus operates a mix of 60 different vehicles:

Product list and details (information from YRT)
Make/model	Description	Fleet size	Year acquired	Year retired	Notes
Ontario Bus Industries Orion II	Custom built wheelchair accessible vehicle	6	1988, 1991, 1997, 1998, 2000	2003	from Newmarket Transit, Vaughan Transit and Markham Transit
Overland Custom Coach Ford ELF (E450 Super Duty Chassis)	Custom built wheelchair accessible vehicle	16	2003	Active	Similar to vehicles used by the TTC
Ford E350 based buses	Custom built wheelchair accessible vehicle				
Chevrolet Venture vans	Custom built wheelchair accessible vehicle				Operated by contractors (Dignity Transportation Inc, Royal Taxi, Mobility Transportation Specialists Inc, Wheelchair Accessible Transit Inc and World In Motion Transportation Inc) on behalf of YRT
ElDorado National E-Z Rider II MAX	Low floor bus	6	2005	Active	Services Community Bus routes only
Vehicle Production Group MV-1	Assessible low floor cab	2	2015	Active	Inspector vehicles and can be used to transfer Mobility patrons

Denotes wheelchair-accessible vehicles

YRT MP also contracts out services to taxi companies to operate car and minivan based services:

- Royal Taxi
- Mobility Transportation Services
- Scarborough City Cab

YRT MP also operates an unknown number of Toyota Camry or Chevrolet Impala in the fleet.

Together they provide 29 taxis and 19 minivans to the MP fleet. YRT leased 3 minivans to the contracts to complete the non-bus fleet.

== See also ==
- WheelTrans
- Toronto Accessible Transit Services
- Transhelp
