= David Shannon (lawyer) =

David Shannon CM, OOnt
- Born: August 29, 1963 (age 63); Fort William, Ontario, Canada
- Other name: Dave
- Education: Lakehead University 1982-1986, BA, Dalhousie University L.L.B.1987-1991, London School of Economics 1992-1997 L.L.M.
- Occupations: Disability/human rights activist, lawyer, politician, actor, university lecturer, author, and adventurer
- Spouses: Allison Denton (m. 2001; div. 2006) Darlene Bruzzese (m. 2015)
- Parent(s): William Shannon (father), Lorraine Shannon (mother)
- Relatives: Liana (sister), Janice (sister)

David Shannon, CM, OOnt (born August 29, 1963) is a Canadian disability/human rights activist, lawyer, politician, actor, university lecturer, author, and adventurer. After breaking his neck in a rugby scrum at the University of Waterloo in 1981, he was rendered a quadriplegic. Subsequently, Shannon finished law school and became a disability rights activist. His Dave Shannon Cross-Canada Tour in 1997 gained national media attention as he became the first quadriplegic to trek across Canada in a motorized wheelchair. Shannon has held positions in academia, law, social services, and human rights in both Thunder Bay, Ontario, and Halifax, Nova Scotia. In the late 2000s, Shannon became the first quadriplegic to reach the North Pole and to parachute out of an airplane at an altitude of over 25,000 feet. Shannon has won numerous prestigious awards and honours, such as the Order of Ontario and the Order of Canada for his work advancing the rights of the disabled and other minority groups in Canada and abroad.

== Early life, 1963–1981 ==
David Shannon was born in Fort William, Ontario (now Thunder Bay) on August 29, 1963, to William (Bill) and Lorraine Shannon. He spent the first eight years of his life in the city with his two sisters, Janice and Liana. His father Bill decided to pursue a Ph.D. in health education; therefore, the family moved in the early 1970s to Greeley, Colorado. Once his father finished his doctorate, the family moved to Philadelphia, Pennsylvania, where Bill accepted a position at Temple University. In 1975, Shannon’s family moved again, this time, to Dartmouth, Nova Scotia, as Bill took on a faculty position with the School of Physical Education at Dalhousie University. Shannon was twelve at the time and enrolled in Ellenvale Junior High School where he became active in drama and sports. In the late 1970s, Shannon attended Prince Andrew High School where he continued to excel in drama and rugby. Prior to his last year of high school, Shannon’s parents moved to Mississauga, Ontario, where his father, who had at the time become "disenchanted with academia", accepted a job with the city of Toronto Health Care Unit. Shannon decided to stay in Dartmouth for his final year of high school; in fact, Shannon’s high school rugby team won the provincial championship that year. During Shannon’s graduation in June 1981, he won awards in sports and drama as well as a medal for the student most involved in extracurricular activities. The summer after completing high school, Shannon represented Nova Scotia in rugby at the 1981 Canada Games in Thunder Bay, Ontario. In September 1981, Shannon enrolled in the University of Waterloo to pursue an undergraduate degree in drama. The move allowed Shannon to be closer to his parents, and the university offered him a scholarship to play rugby for their varsity team, the University of Waterloo Warriors.

== University of Waterloo rugby injury and stay in Lyndhurst Hospital, 1981–1982 ==
Three weeks into his university career, Shannon suffered a life-changing sports injury playing rugby at the University of Waterloo. During a practice, the scrum he was involved in collapsed with Shannon’s head being driven into the turf resulting in the breakage of his neck at the 5th vertebra (c 4.5 break). The accident rendered Shannon a quadriplegic. Shannon spent the next month in the Kitchener/Waterloo General Hospital, later being moved to Lyndhurst Rehabilitation Hospital in North York, Ontario, for rehab. A month after the accident, the University of Waterloo Warriors and the University of Toronto Blues dedicated all the proceeds of an October 1981 rugby match to Shannon. Shannon overcame some early difficulties during his recovery, such as losing 35 lbs, suffering from a severe bladder infection, and experiencing temperatures as high as 104 degrees F. However, he was able to visit his parents’ home in Mississauga that Christmas, which received local media attention. After his rehabilitation at Lyndhurst, Shannon wanted to continue his education and moved to Thunder Bay in 1982 to pursue an undergraduate degree.

== Education and early activism in Thunder Bay, Ontario, 1982–1984 ==
In 1982, Shannon moved back to his hometown and entered Lakehead University majoring in English literature and minoring in law and politics. At the time, Thunder Bay was a leader in accessible housing and transportation, and Shannon moved into an apartment in the fully accessible Castlegreen housing complex run by the Handicapped Action Group Incorporated (HAGI). While pursuing his undergraduate degree, he and his friend, Darlene Bruzzese (his future second wife), were influential in setting up a local chapter of the Spinal Cord Society, which was an international organization based in Fergus Falls, Minnesota. The organization was founded by Dr. Charles E. Carson in 1978 and focused on finding a cure for spinal cord injuries; indeed, its motto was "a cure not care". The Thunder Bay chapter was the 5th in Canada and 120th in North America with Shannon becoming the project coordinator. He obtained a federal grant, which allowed the chapter to engage in public events becoming the most active in Canada.

== Graduation from Lakehead and move to Halifax, Nova Scotia, 1986–1991 ==
Midway through his undergraduate studies, Shannon relocated to another accessible apartment in Thunder Bay, Glenwood Court where HAGI provided attendant services. However, the polling station he was assigned to was wheelchair inaccessible (having a flight of stairs), which left him "denied the right to vote". The incident made headlines in Thunder Bay with Shannon petitioning the mayor, city council, and the Ontario Human Rights Commission to make all polling stations completely accessible rather than relying on advanced polls or voting by proxy. While in his last year at Lakehead, Shannon became the assistant regional co-ordinator of the Canadian Paraplegic Association where he organized peer interaction groups for those with spinal cord injuries. Shannon graduated from Lakehead University in the spring of 1986 and moved to Halifax, Nova Scotia to pursue a law degree in 1987 at Dalhousie University. At Dalhousie, Shannon developed a passion for human rights and constitutional law. In his final year, he became student union president and graduated alongside future Canadian Foreign Affairs Minister Peter McKay.

== Acting stint and early law career, 1991–1997 ==
After graduating with a Bachelor of Law from Dalhousie in 1991, Shannon decided to take two years off to pursue his passion of acting in Los Angeles, California, and Toronto, Ontario. He moved to Los Angeles with some friends in early 1991 and took acting, advanced film, commercial, and television classes. Shannon also studied voice under Marjorie Taylor who is well known for her work with touring opera companies. It was during this time that Shannon created and performed his one-man stage play The Puck Dances Lovingly. The play was the story of a young man transitioning into adulthood. Shannon used a series of monologues and prose passages to explain this transition by imagining the young man alone on a hockey rink with the puck all to himself. In the early 1990s, Shannon scored a series of small roles in television commercials, but his big break came in 1992 with a recurring role as hard-hitting family lawyer Shawn O’Donnell in the courtroom television drama Divorce Court. After Divorce Court, Shannon began work at the Kinnea-Aweya legal aid clinic; he was called to the Bar of the Law Society of Upper Canada in 1996. Shannon also started his L.L.M. at the London School of Economics in the fall of 1992, graduating in 1997. During this time, Shannon worked part-time as a lawyer and disability advocate in Thunder Bay while also planning a cross-Canada motorized wheelchair tour.

== The Dave Shannon Cross-Canada Tour, 1994–1998 ==
At 34, Shannon became the first quadriplegic to travel across Canada in a motorized wheelchair to raise money in support of educational, entrepreneurial, and research initiatives for the disabled. The cross-country trip was first attempted in 1980 by Terry Fox; however, Fox was forced to stop in September 1980 near Thunder Bay as his cancer had worsened. After Fox, paraplegic Blair Howell and polio survivor Dan Altan finished cross-Canada treks in manual wheelchairs in 1983; then Rick Hansen engaged in a world wheelchair tour from 1985–1987, but the journey had never been attempted by a quadriplegic in a motorized wheelchair. Shannon got the idea to journey across Canada because he felt very fortunate living in Thunder Bay, which he believed was a world-leader in accessibility for the disabled. This belief along with over a decade of disability activism made him realize not everyone had the same opportunities he had. Shannon began planning for his tour in the summer of 1994, obtaining corporate sponsorship from Scotia Bank, Human Resources Development Canada and Invacare to fund the trek. Shannon held an informal press conference in Thunder Bay on May 5, 1995, to inaugurate the April to October 1997 tour of about 10,000 km. Shannon and his team spent the remainder of 1995 and 1996 raising money and awareness. Shannon had a large team that "rival[ed] the [team from the] Terry Fox Marathon of Hope"; in fact, his future first wife, Alison Denton, was one of the team members on the six and a half month tour. The tour received extensive national media coverage with an official Toronto launch at the former Sky Dome on February 20, 1997, followed by a reception at a Toronto Raptors NBA game where Shannon was presented with a team jersey.

Shannon started the tour on April 1, 1997, in St. John’s, Newfoundland, by dipping an oar into the Atlantic Ocean and then proceeded to travel about 75 km per day with a support van and three crew members, including Denton. During the tour, Shannon visited every provincial capital and wheeled within 25 km of 90% of the Canadian population. In larger cities, Shannon gave presentations about the benefits of employment and education for living a satisfying life and performed his one-man play The Puck Dances Lovingly. Shannon completed his tour on October 14, 1997, by dipping his oar into the Pacific Ocean in Vancouver, British Columbia. The tour raised a total of about $500,000, which was used to fund start-up programs, scholarships, research, educational and job opportunities for the disabled. Following the tour, Shannon received a host of provincial and national awards including the Canadian Foundation for Physically Disabled Persons’ King Clancy Award (recognizes national and community service for people with a disability), the Paul Gerrie Fellowship from the Rotary Club of Toronto-Don Valley (community service), the Clarke Institute’s Courage to Come Back Award and was the keynote speaker for the opening of the Fitness Centre at Lyndhurst Rehabilitation Hospital and Spinal Cord Centre in Toronto. Shannon was also featured on the cover of the Canadian disability magazine WhyNot and gave many motivational speeches across the country in the late 1990s.

== Law, political, and advocacy career, 1998–2006 ==
After the Cross-Canada tour, Shannon started his own Thunder Bay law practice in April 1998 — The Shannon Law Office. Shannon practiced administrative, mental health, family, disability, and human rights law, while also doing motivational speeches, working with his foundation, and engaging in disability rights activism. Shannon also became a sessional lecturer at both Confederation College and Lakehead University in the Aboriginal Law and Advocacy Program and Political Science departments respectively. Shannon and Denton married in 2001. In February 2001 began advocating to ensure the passage of the Ontarians with a Disability Act (ODA). In 2003, Shannon’s foundation created the Together Ability Group (TAG), which promoted the networking of disabled entrepreneurs in Thunder Bay. In the mid-2000s, Shannon also became a member of the board of directors for the Canadian Association of Independent Living Centres in Canada, executive director of the Nova Scotia Canadian Paraplegic Association, and the founding chairman of the Accessibility Advisory Council of Ontario.

== Involvement with the United Nations Convention on the Rights of Persons with Disabilities, 2005–2006 ==
Because of Shannon’s extensive work with the disability rights movement in Canada, he was chosen in the summer of 2005 to help develop an international human rights treaty to protect the rights of the disabled. The treaty was eventually called the Convention on the Rights of Persons with Disabilities (CRPD), and Shannon partook in discussions at the United Nations’ headquarters in New York to help craft it. In fact, he represented the Canadian Association of Independent Living Centres. Referring to the CRPD, Shannon noted that "[t]his will be probably the last major human rights treaty that’s seen in our lifetime."

== Legal Council for the Canadian Association of Independent Living Centres in the Council of Canadians With Disabilities v. VIA Rail Canada Inc. Supreme Court of Canada case, 2006 ==
In the mid-2000s, Shannon was the attorney for intervener for the Canadian Association of Independent Living Centres in the national case of the Council of Canadians With Disabilities v. VIA Rail Canada Inc. The case centered on whether VIA Rail needed to make the 139 rail cars it purchased in December 2000 fully accessible for the disabled. The case went to the Supreme Court of Canada in 2007 where, in a 5-4 verdict, the Court ruled that VIA needed to make the cars accessible.

== Six Degrees of Dignity, 2007 ==
In April 2007, Shannon released his book, Six Degrees of Dignity: Disability in the Age of Freedom. The book puts forth a new way of looking at society where both the able-bodied and disabled are treated with the same degree of dignity. Shannon’s Six Degrees of Dignity model identifies various social and attitudinal barriers present in Canadian society. To rectify these barriers, Shannon puts forth six factors that need to be embraced, including dignity in public perception, dignity in the community, dignity in law, dignity in public policy, dignity of self, and dignity in future.

== Participation in extreme sports, 2009 ==
In 2009, Shannon became the first quadriplegic to travel to the North Pole and to parachute out of an airplane at an altitude of over 25,000 feet. In April 2009, Shannon along with fellow disabled Thunder Bay lawyer Christopher Watkins reached the North Pole where they planted a handicapped parking sign. The event was called Team Independent 09’, and it was used to raise awareness for disability issues and inclusion. Shannon had a specially designed sled for the trip and wore a "walking sleeping bag" since his body does not have an internal thermometer. The feat made national headlines with Shannon and Watkins featured on the front cover of the Summer 2009 disability societal and cultural magazine Abilities. After Shannon’s Arctic feat, he also became the first quadriplegic to parachute out of an airplane in 2009 at an altitude of over 20,000 feet. To celebrate December 3, the International Day of the Disabled Person, Shannon and Watkins jumped about 27,400 feet over New Orleans, Louisiana. Although he was strapped to a tandem master, Shannon suffered soft tissue injuries to both shoulders and broke his hip.

== National and provincial awards, 2010–2012 ==
From 2010 to 2011, Shannon was recognized for his disability rights activism with a series of national and provincial awards. In the summer of 2010, the Law Society of Upper Canada honoured both Shannon and Watkins with biographies on their website as part of the Diversifying the Bar: Lawyers Make History project. Shannon was also inducted into the Canadian Disability Hall of Fame in the achiever category in November 2010. In January 2011, Shannon was appointed to the Order of Ontario by then-Lieutenant Governor General of Ontario David Onley for his "commitment to policy and legal advocacy for the protection of human rights and community inclusion for persons with disabilities". Later that year, he was invested into the Order of Canada by the Governor General of Canada David Johnston "for his advocacy on behalf of people living with disabilities." Shannon also won the Distinguished Alumni Award from Lakehead University in 2011 for his contribution to the furtherance of human rights. In 2012, Shannon was awarded the Queen Elizabeth II Golden Jubilee Medal "for significant contributions to fellow Canadian citizens." He was also previously given the Thunder Bay Law Association’s Service Award "for service above and beyond usual or normal expectations or standards for the benefit of the citizens of Thunder Bay."

== Professional career, 2009–2017 ==
In 2009, Shannon joined the Canadian Disability Policy Alliance in a two-year stint as the co-chair of the citizenship committee where he tackled accessibility issues throughout Canada. Shannon continued to practice law in Thunder Bay before moving to Halifax to accept the position as CEO of the Nova Scotia Human Rights Commission (NSHRC). Shannon was also appointed to a part-time position with the Ontario Human Rights Tribunal where he travelled throughout the province to hear and mediate human rights complaints. While CEO of the NSHRC, Shannon created a "new model of restorative justice" which advanced the mediation stage in disputes to something similar to a "traditional First Nations approach." In 2014, while continuing to practice law in Thunder Bay, Shannon became the executive director of the Handicapped Action Group Incorporated (a Thunder Bay social service provider for the disabled) where he advanced accessible and supportive housing. During his time at HAGI, Shannon promoted independence and restructured health services. Shannon was also embroiled in a dispute with the provincial government over the potential closure of HAGI’s accessible Wilderness Discovery Camp on Shebandowan Lake just outside Thunder Bay. Wilderness Discovery is one of the few camps in Canada that is fully accessible to the disabled. However, in 2015 HAGI's government lease came up for renewal, and the provincial government wanted it to purchase the land for a six figure amount. An agreement with the provincial government was finally reached in 2017, and a local service group took over the camp. However, by this time, Shannon had left HAGI to pursue law.

== Disability activism and involvement with the Parapan Am Games, 2015 ==
In the summer of 2015, as the director of HAGI, Shannon celebrated the 10 year anniversary of the Accessibility for Ontarians with Disabilities Act (AODA) at a Thunder Bay press conference. The AODA plans to make Ontario fully accessible by 2025 and Shannon commented that "Thunder Bay has become a model of accessibility" that other cities can look to for inspiration. That summer, Shannon also married his second wife, Darlene Bruzzese, and received an international disability honour by being chosen to be a flag bearer at the 2015 Parapan Am Games in Toronto. ...
