= Arlette Lefebvre =

Canadian child psychiatrist (born 1947)

Arlette Marie-Laure Lefebvre, CM OOnt, known by her patients as "Dr. Froggie" (born 26 July 1947) is a child psychiatrist at the Hospital for Sick Children in Toronto, Ontario, Canada.

== Early life ==
Born in Montreal, Quebec, Lefebvre received a Bachelor of Arts degree in 1964 from the Université de Caen and a Doctor of Medicine degree in 1970 from the University of Toronto. Lefebvre is also an associate professor at the University of Toronto.

== Career ==
Lefebvre has been a staff psychiatrist in the Department of Psychiatry at the Hospital for Sick Children in Toronto since 1975, following a teaching clinical fellowship there in 1974–1975 and a Royal College Fellowship from the University of Toronto's Faculty of Medicine. She has also been a consultant to Holland Bloorview Kids Rehabilitation Hospital, and has consulted within SickKids to its paediatric multi-organ transplant, rheumatology, and HIV/AIDS comprehensive care programs.

In 1991, recognizing the social isolation faced by young patients coping with chronic hospitalization and physical limitations Lefebvre founded Ability Online (originally launched in 1992 as one of the first email networks for paediatric patients), an online peer-support network connecting children and youth with disabilities, chronic illness, and social isolation to mentors and each other. She was also the driving force behind the creation of two related support networks, AboutFace and AbleNET. She was an active member of the Media Awareness Network of Canada from 1990 to 2017, and co-founded the "Planning My Trip to the Hospital" program to support children who are highly anxious about, or traumatized by, medical procedures.

She is a member of both the Order of Ontario and the Order of Canada. In 1991, she founded Ability Online. In 1996, she was inducted into the Terry Fox Hall of Fame.

== Honours ==
Lefebvre was invested as a Member of the Order of Canada on 23 September 1999 (having been announced on 15 April 1999), with her citation noting her work building "a network of psycho-social support agencies which foster self-esteem and independent living" among her young patients. She has also received the Paul Steinhauer Award (1999), the SickKids Medical Staff Association Citizenship Award (2010), and the Ontario Council for Exceptional Children Award (2019).
