= Margaret McLeod =

Canadian teacher

- Born: 1915; St. Catharines
- Died: June 19, 1993
- Other names: Marg McLeod
- Occupation: teacher

Margaret Laleah McLeod OC OMC (née Seixas 1915 — June 19, 1993) was the founder of the Cheshire Homes in Canada which provided housing for people with disabilities. Outside of the Cheshire Homes, McLeod was a co-founder of the Ontario Federation for the Physically Handicapped. McLeod was awarded the Order of Canada in 1979 and inducted into the Terry Fox Hall of Fame in 1993.

== Early life and education ==
McLeod mainly spent her childhood in Mexico following her St. Catharines birth during 1915. At Wheelock College, McLeod studied early childhood education.

== Career ==
McLeod went to New York City and Havergal College to work as an elementary school teacher. She joined the Ontario Crippled Children's Centre in 1962 as a volunteer. While working there as a teacher, she went to England and visited the Cheshire Homes. McLeod was inspired to create Cheshire Homes for people with disabilities in Canada.

McLeod founded the North American base of Cheshire Homes in 1970. The first Canadian Cheshire Home opened was McLeod House in 1972, which was named after her. After the opening of McLeod House, she started the Clarendon Foundation in Toronto and extended her work to other parts of Ontario including Streetsville, Mississauga and Belleville, Ontario. During her time at Cheshire Homes, she was on the developing committee for the organization, and founded over twenty Cheshire Homes. Outside of her work with Cheshire Homes, McLeod co-founded the Ontario Federation for the Physically Handicapped.

== Awards and honours ==
In 1978, McLeod was awarded with the Ontario Medal for Good Citizenship. The following year, McLeod was honoured with the Order of Canada. In 1993, she was inducted into the Terry Fox Hall of Fame.

== Personal life and death ==
McLeod was known as Margaret Seixas before her 1941 marriage. While married, she had three children. McLeod died on June 19, 1993.
