= David Lepofsky =

Canadian lawyer and disability advocate (born 1957)

M. David Lepofsky CM OOnt (born 1957) is a Canadian academic, retired lawyer and disability advocate. Blind for much of his life, Lepofsky was named one of Canada's most influential lawyers in 2010.

He is the author of the 1985 book Open Justice: The Constitutional Right to Attend and Speak About Criminal Proceedings.

== Education ==
Lepofsky graduated in 1979 with honours from Osgoode Hall Law School with a Bachelor of Laws. He obtained a Masters of Law from the Harvard Law School in 1982.

== Career ==
He was admitted to the Ontario Bar in 1981. From 1982 to the end of 2015, he practised law in Toronto with the Attorney General of Ontario, in the areas of constitutional, civil, administrative and most recently, criminal law. In 2004, became the Attorney General's General Counsel.

From 1982 to 1988, he served as counsel in the Crown Law Office Civil, conducting civil, administrative and constitutional litigation on behalf of the Ontario Government. From 1987 to 2005, he served as Associate Head of the Ontario Bar Admission's Course's Public Law Section. From 1989 to 1993, he served as counsel in the Constitutional Law and Policy Division, conducting constitutional litigation on the Government's behalf. From 1993 to the end of 2015, he served as counsel in the Crown Law Office Criminal, conducting criminal appeals in the Ontario Court of Appeal and the Supreme Court of Canada. He retired from the Ontario Public Service at the end of 2015. Since 1991, he worked part time at the University of Toronto Faculty of Law, teaching about freedom of expression and press. Since January 2016, has served as a part-time visiting professor of legal ethics and public interest advocacy on the faculty at the Osgoode Hall Law School.

He was a founding member of, and served as co-chair of Barrier-Free Canada, a community coalition that advocates for the enactment of a national Canadians with Disabilities Act. Since April 2015, Lepofsky has served as a member of the Toronto District School Board's Special Education Advisory Committee. In January 2016, he became its chair.

Canadian Lawyer Magazine listed Lepofsky among Canada's 25 most influential lawyers in August 2010.

Lepofsky is the author of the 1985 book Open Justice: The Constitutional Right to Attend and Speak About Criminal Proceedings, and the author or co-author of 30 law journal articles or book chapters on topics including constitutional law, criminal law, administrative law, human rights, and the rights of persons with disabilities.

== Honours ==
Lepofsky was awarded the Order of Canada in 1995. In 2004, Lepofsky became part of the Canadian Disability Hall of Fame. Lepofsky was awarded the Order of Ontario in 2007 for "his work on behalf of people with disabilities in Ontario which helped lead to Ontarians with Disabilities Act 2001 and the Accessibility for Ontarians with Disabilities Act 2005."
