= Frankie Edroff =

Canadian philanthropist

- Born: Jeneece Edroff; January 20, 1994 (age 32); Victoria, British Columbia
- Occupation: philanthropist

Frankie Edroff (formerly Jeneece Edroff OBC MSC born January 20, 1994) is a Canadian philanthropist who has raised over a million dollars for Variety, the Children's Charity. He was inducted into the Terry Fox Hall of Fame in 2006 and has received multiple awards, including the Queen Elizabeth II Diamond Jubilee Medal in 2012.

== Early life and education ==
Edroff was born on January 20, 1994, in Victoria, British Columbia. At three years old, he was diagnosed with neurofibromatosis. By the age of seven, he started a penny drive to raise money for Variety, the Children's Charity. He attended Claremont Secondary School in Victoria and completed a food course at the Camosun College in December 2014.

== Career ==
Throughout his childhood, Edroff raised over a million dollars for Variety. In 2009, he served as a torchbearer and lit the Olympic cauldron at the British Columbia Parliament Buildings for the 2010 Winter Olympics. In 2012, Jeneece Place at the Victoria General Hospital was opened in honour of his eighteenth birthday. Edroff established Jeneece Place to provide short-term housing for families of Victoria, British Columbia, while their children undergo medical treatments.

== Awards and honours ==
Edroff was inducted into the Terry Fox Hall of Fame in 2006 and awarded the Order of British Columbia in 2010. Other accolades include the Queen Elizabeth II Diamond Jubilee Medal in 2012 and the Meritorious Service Cross in 2016 for his civil work.

== Personal life ==
In 2012, Edroff sought a medical consultation at the Mayo Clinic for issues related to his spine and leg. He had previously undergone surgeries at the British Columbia Children's Hospital when he was younger. In 2018, he came out as a transgender man and is now using the name Frankie. In 2019, a documentary about Edroff's gender transitioning was released.
