= Region of Peel Accessible Transportation Services =

Transportation service in Ontario, Canada

Region of Peel Accessible Transportation Services is a family of paratransit services operated by the Regional Municipality of Peel in Ontario, Canada.

== Services ==
=== Caledon Community Services Transportation ===
Caledon Community Services Transportation is an accessible bus service for residents of Caledon. It was created in 1989, providing transportation to medical appointments, day programs, dialysis and other required social services. This service also offers some trips to malls in other cities and regions such as Upper Canada Mall in Newmarket and Bramalea City Centre in Brampton.

==== Eligibility ====
- All seniors living in Caledon
- Caledon residents who are unable to drive because of a medical disability
- Clients of Ontario Works
- Dialysis patients
- People experiencing mobility issues.
- TransHelp, MobilityPlus and Wheel-Trans transfer riders

==== Operations ====
CCST operates Monday to Saturday from 6:00 a.m. to 6:00 p.m, and on Sundays from 9:00 a.m. to 2:00 p.m.

=== Passenger Plus ===
The Passenger Plus program, in partnership with the Canadian Red Cross, is being offered for dialysis patients in Brampton and Mississauga. Service to hospitals throughout the region are being offered three times a week.

Passenger Plus program is projected to make 17,000 trips in 2012.

=== Passenger Assistant Program ===
The Passenger Assistant Program, also in partnership with the Red Cross, is offered for adults and seniors in Brampton and Mississauga who have intellectual or mental health disabilities such as epilepsy, low vision, and Alzheimer's disease. It also serves people who require supervised transportation and assistance while travelling. This is contrary to TransHelp where passengers using that particular service are more independent. Each passenger is met by designated caregivers at each end of their trip. One or more assistants are on board with clients and are present in case of emergency.

As of 2009, the program was being used by 63 people in Mississauga and Brampton, with 60 more on the waiting list. The Passenger Assistant Program is projected to make 32,000 trips in 2012.

=== TransHelp ===
TransHelp is a separate accessible transit system operated by and serving the cities of Brampton and Mississauga (where conventional transit systems accessible for independent wheelchair users are operated by each city as Brampton Transit and Miway). It is used by people with mobility problems, are unable to climb or descend stairs, or cannot walk a distance of 175 metres. Less-independent wheelchair users are allowed to use Transhelp, but the elderly or dialysis patients are not automatically eligible.

Transhelp is the most popular paratransit service being offered by the Region: it is projected to make 403,000 trips in 2012.

==== Operations ====
Transhelp operates seven days a week from 6:00 a.m. to 1:00 a.m., including holidays. Additional service is being offered during statutory holidays.

Weekend and Holiday service and trips that cannot be accommodated by paratransit vehicles are provided by taxi services:

- Brampton: BramCity Taxi
- Mississauga: Blue and White Taxi

== Fares ==
=== Caledon ===
The fare varies from $3.00 to $30.00 depending on the distance travelled.

=== Mississauga and Brampton ===
The fare for Peel's accessible services is based on the cash fares of its parallel conventional transit services: Brampton Transit and MiWay. The fare is equal to the cheaper of those two cash fares. As of February 2024, Brampton Transit cash fares are $4.50 and MiWay fares are $4.00 (though with free transfer privileges between them), so a one-way trip costs $4.00, regardless of the distance travelled.

For TransHelp users, in order to have a TransHelp account, new registrants will have to prepay at least $32.50, which is equivalent to 10 one-way trips. A monthly pass is also being offered for $108. No-show and cancellation fees are being deducted from the TransHelp account.

== Other programs ==
=== Public Transit Access Initiative ===
This initiative helps people with disabilities in Brampton, Ajax, Whitby, Oshawa, and Mississauga to become comfortable and familiar with accessible public transit systems. The region's Accessible Transportation provides and pays for travel training assessments, as well as up to five hours of individualized travel training for those who want to learn to use Brampton Transit or MiWay.

=== Taxi Scrip ===
The Taxi Scrip program provides spontaneous transportation for people with disabilities in Brampton and Mississauga using a taxi. Trips can be used for a variety of purposes such as urgent appointments, medical appointments and visits to long-term care facilities. Seniors and people with disabilities can purchase subsidized taxi scrip: each book containing $40 worth of taxi fare will only cost the user $25.

The Taxi Scrip is projected to make 11,000 trips in 2012.

==== Participating taxi companies ====
- Mississauga:
  - A Cab
  - A Black Cab
  - All Star Taxi
  - Blue and White Taxi
  - Mississauga Taxi
- Brampton:
  - A Seven Eleven Taxi, Inc.
  - Brampton Bramalea Kwik Kab
  - BramCity Taxi
- Ajax:
  - Get Limo Inc
- Whitby:
  - Beck Limo
- Oshawa:
  - Airofleet

== Fleet ==
- Crestline ElDorado National Aerotech - cutaway bus with van chassis
- Crestline (Goshen Coach) GCII - cutaway bus with van chassis

== See also ==
- WheelTrans
- Caledon Community Services Transportation
- Care-a-van
