= Neil Squire =

Disabled Canadian accounting student

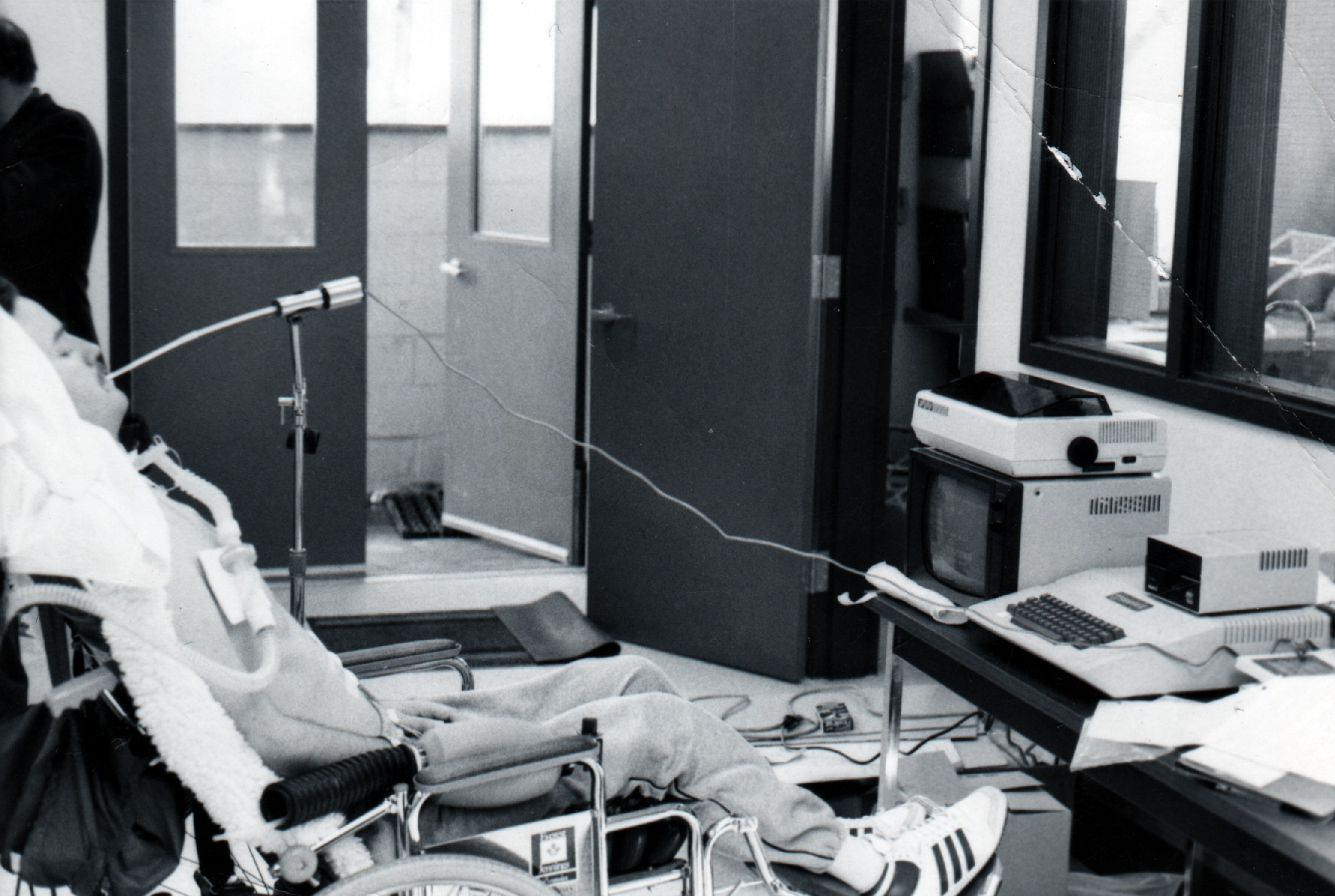
Neil Squire using the sip and puff teleprinter

Neil Squire was a Canadian accounting student at the University of Victoria and a basketball player. After a car accident left him a high level tetraplegic, his efforts to learn a new form of communication became the inspiration for the creation of the Neil Squire Society.

Throughout his childhood he was involved in school, music and sports, and by the time he reached high school, he had won several awards for academics, service, band and sports. When he graduated, he had performed well at provincial level basketball.

In December 1980, Squire, who had begun studying accounting at the University of Victoria, hit a patch of black ice at Nanaimo, which was only a short distance from his home. His car hit a tree and he sustained a C1/brainstem injury. This accident left him paralyzed from the neck down, unable to speak and reliant on a respirator.

After many months of rehabilitation at the Shaughnessy Hospital Spinal Cord Unit, Squire began working with his inventor relative Bill Cameron to learn to use the "sip-and-puff" machine that Bill had created from an old teleprinter to aid Squire in communication. He learned to use Morse code, which was converted into words on a screen through Cameron's device. This original device was soon replaced by a computer.

By the time Squire died of kidney failure on April 18, 1984, he had moved from Shaughnessy Hospital to an extended care unit at Gorge Road hospital in Victoria, BC. There, many volunteers worked with him and other patients in what had come to be called the Computer Comfort program.

These volunteers had been looking for an appropriate name to give their efforts. They named their group the Neil Squire Foundation, later the Neil Squire Society, and this organization has been helping persons with disabilities across Canada increase their independence ever since.
