= Jack Jorgensen =

German–Australian soldier (1843–1893)

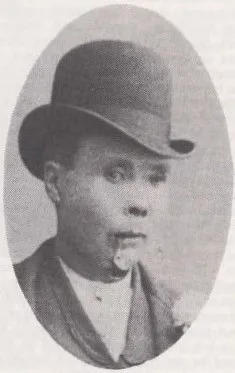
- Jorgensen c. 1888
- Born: Johanna Margherita Jorgensen (Note: Reported by The Bendigo Advertiser as Johanna Magrete Jorgensen.); 20 May 1843; Berlin, Prussia
- Died: 5 September 1893 (aged 51); Runnymede East, Victoria, Australia
- Resting place: Colbinabbin Cemetery, Victoria, Australia
- Other names: Jack Jorgenson; John Jorgensen; Johann Martin Jorgensen; Johanna Johnson; Joseph Johnson

Jack Jorgensen (Note: Also spelled Jorgenson. Both spellings are used in official documents held by the Public Record Office.) (born Johanna Margherita Jorgensen; 20 May 1843 – 5 September 1893) was a German-born Australian labourer and member of the Victorian Mounted Rifles. Though assigned female at birth, much of Jorgensen's adult life was spent living as a man.

== Life ==
Johanna Margherita Jorgensen was born in Berlin, Prussia, on 20 May 1843 as the second daughter of a Danish father and German mother. The family departed Germany for Australia in 1848, leaving the port of Hamburg on 6 August and arriving in Adelaide on 1 December. Jorgensen was reportedly kicked in the face by a horse around the age of 16, leading to a facial disfigurement that Jorgensen would later attribute to an injury sustained serving in the Second Schleswig War. Jorgensen lived in Adelaide until moving to Victoria in 1872, taking up work as a servant in Heathcote while presenting as female for approximately six months.

Jorgensen, then working under the name Joseph Johnson, first attracted press attention after being charged by police for "wearing male attire" while working as a fence-builder in Mia Mia. After being arrested on 21 October 1873, Jorgensen would be brought before the Heathcote Police Court on 24 October and identified as Johanna Johnson by a previous employer. Jorgensen claimed to have worn male attire since childhood, to have served in the army as a man, and to have "a better feeling towards the ladies than the gentlemen". Jorgensen's disfigurement was noted, with the arresting officer and a doctor telling the court that Jorgensen was verbally abused and called a man when in female attire. After being given a set of women's clothing and cautioned against dressing in men's clothing again by the court, Jorgenson was discharged without punishment.

Some time after this count appearance, Jorgensen would travel to the nearby town of Runnymede East, near Elmore, and resumed living as a man while working as a farm labourer. During this period Jorgensen made a living grubbing, wood splitting, harvesting crops, and bullock driving among other activities, gaining a reputation as an honest and hard worker. Though some in the local community suspected Jorgensen to be female, these suspicions were not widespread, and Jorgensen continued to live and work as a man without attracting much attention. During this time Jorgensen was known to drink alcohol, sometimes "shouting" rounds of drinks at bars, smoke a pipe, and vote in elections as a man. Though speaking in broken English with a thick accent, Jorgensen was known to be talkative and a "most persistent wooer of the fair sex", at one point seeking to marry a local woman but having the proposal rejected by her parents. Jorgensen was reported to have struggled in finding a wife due to disfigurement and attracted mockery from some local men for this lack of success.

Jorgensen joined the Elmore detachment of the volunteer Victorian Mounted Rifles in 1886. Jorgensen was reported to have been an active member of the detachment, attending drills, participating in parades, and, at one point, being selected to escort a governor. Fellow members of the Elmore Mounted Rifles spoke positively of Jorgensen's service. When contacted after Jorgensen's death, a colonel said Jorgensen was "a keen soldier, a most patient one, and always ready to volunteer for any hard work", while a major reported that Jorgensen had "enormously big, powerful arms, and was capable of lifting great weights with ease. Whenever there was any particularly heavy work to be done, Jorgensen was always called on, and readily responded." Jorgensen would resign from the detachment in 1891, with the aforementioned colonel saying that Jorgensen was "one of the men whose resignation I regretted exceedingly".

== Death and legacy ==
Jorgenson was found dead in a hut in Runnymede East on Tuesday 5 September 1893, reportedly after a period of illness attributed to asthma and rheumatic fever. An autopsy was performed and the revelation that Jorgensen was assigned female at birth was quickly shared with local newspapers, with The Age, The Argus, The Bendigo Advertiser, and The Bendigo Independent each carrying a notice of Jorgensen's death on 6 September. Jorgensen was buried in Colbinabbin Cemetery on 7 September 1893.

Female-to-male crossdressers, often referred to as "male impersonators" or "passing women", were not unknown in 19th-century colonial Australia, though Jorgenson would become one of the most well known. The reveal of Jorgenson's assigned sex upon death drew many comparisons to Edward De Lacy Evans in the contemporary press. The contemporary Australian feminist journal The Dawn briefly commented on Jorgensen's case in October 1893, saying, "Instances where women do men's work from choice are not scarce, but the reverse is rare."

Jorgenson's case inspired the character of Nosey Alf in Australian author Joseph Furphy's 1903 novel Such Is Life. Many aspects of the character's story are directly lifted from Jorgensen's life, with Furphy writing the following in an undated letter:

And I must thank you for the two papers you sent, containing particulars of Jack Jorgensen. Perhaps I told you I was intimate with poor Johanna in '77; and afterwards knowing her sex, worked her into my opus as Nosey Alf...

— Joseph Furphy, undated letter to William Cathels
