= Concert Properties =

Canadian real estate company

Concert Properties Ltd.
- Industry: Real Estate and Infrastructure
- Founded: 1989
- Founders: Jack W. Poole; David R. Podmore
- Headquarters: Vancouver, British Columbia, Canada
- Area served: Canada (British Columbia, Alberta, Quebec and Ontario)
- Key people: Catherine Roome (president and CEO); Ivan Limpright (chair); John Dooling (managing director and CFO); David Podmore (chair emeritus)
- Website: www.concertproperties.com

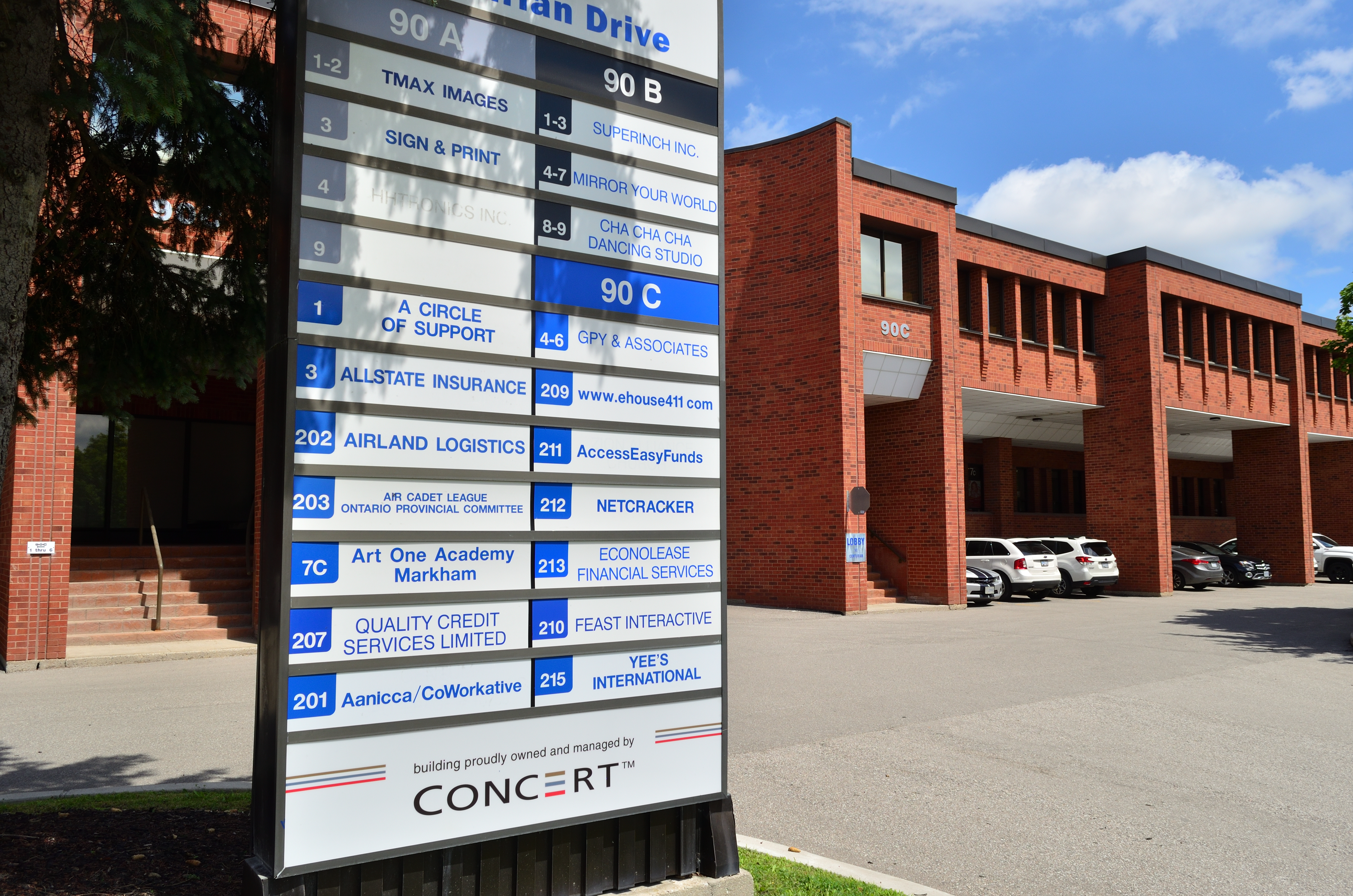
Business park managed by Concert Properties

Concert Properties Ltd. (which is related to Concert Real Estate Corporation) is a Canadian real estate company based in Vancouver, British Columbia. It is owned by 19 union and management pension funds and its commercial assets are valued at over $8 billion.

Concert Properties is the largest developer of rental housing in British Columbia, with properties in the Greater Toronto Area, Metropolitan Vancouver and Victoria, British Columbia, including 7,600 homes, 500,000 square feet of commercial space.

The previous chief executive officer (CEO) and President of Concert Properties was David Podmore. The current chief executive officer (CEO) and President is Catherine Roome.

== History ==
The Vancouver Land Corporation was co-founded in 1989 by Jack W. Poole and David R. Podmore to develop economically priced rental housing in British Columbia. The company's name was later changed to Greystone Properties, and then to its current name, Concert Properties. The company was created jointly by the Provincial government, the City of Vancouver, and 26 union pension funds.

In 2017, David Podmore stepped down as CEO of Concert and was replaced by Brian McCauley. McCauley left the company in 2022 and Podmore took over as Chair, President and CEO. In June 2017, Concert paid RioCan, another real estate company, $26.3 million for a 50% interest in Toronto's oldest strip plaza, the Sunnybrook Plaza. The two companies planned to collaborate on its redevelopment.

In 2018, Concert announced they would be redeveloping Coquitlam Park into 8 buildings comprising up to 2,600 housing units. The City of Coquitlam will cover half the costs, and the first phase is expected to be completed by 2023.
