= Bill Cameron (philanthropist) =

Canadian inventor and engineer, and the founder of the Neil Squire Society

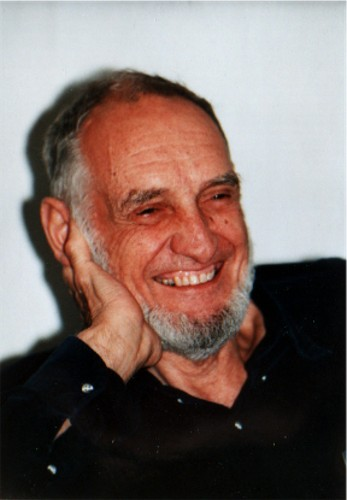
- Born: October 11, 1924
- Died: March 13, 1993 (aged 68)
- Known for: Sip-and-puff Communication System; Founding the Neil Squire Society
- Awards: Therese Casgrain Award (1990); Terry Fox Hall of Fame (posthumously, 1994)
- Scientific career
- Fields: Industrial design and Engineering

Bill Cameron (October 11, 1924 – March 13, 1993) was a Canadian inventor, engineer and founder of the Neil Squire Society. He designed many devices to help people with disabilities including a Sip-and-puff communication system, and a robot arm called M.O.M (Manipulative Obedient Machine). In his life, Cameron was awarded many honors for his work with persons with disabilities.

Born October 11, 1924 in California, Cameron moved to Regina, Saskatchewan, Canada where he spent his childhood. When World War II broke out, he immediately signed up at CFB Petawawa. Unfortunately, once there he developed a sinus condition and it was decided that it would be too cold for him in Europe. He was given a medical discharge. Having dual citizenship, Cameron then joined the U.S. Marine Corps to fight in the Pacific. He served overseas during the war as well as in post-war Japan.

Upon his return to Canada, Cameron enrolled in the engineering program at the University of Saskatchewan but engineering did not feel like a good fit. After an aptitude test it was decided that Cameron would be perfect for the newly created industrial design program. In 1948 he moved to Los Angeles, enrolled at UCLA through the G.I. Bill, and completed his degree in 1950.

Cameron held many interesting positions throughout his career. During his time at UCLA he worked part-time designing motors for U.S. Motors Company. He worked there full-time for about a year after graduating. He was hired by Hughes Aircraft as a designer in 1951 and in 1952 he was sent to Mojave Air Force base to work on a security project. In 1955 he created his own industrial design company. Among the highlights of his company was the creation of the Nest-a-bin liquid shipping container for Kaiser Aluminum and a design for a sliding door handle used in the 1962 World's Fair in Seattle. He spent a number of years in Iiyama, Japan where he designing the first honeycomb fiberglass skis, which were used by Yuichiro Miura to ski down Mount Everest in 1970.

Upon returning to North America, Cameron and his family settled in Vancouver, British Columbia, Canada. Cameron was hired to work at the TRIUMF cyclotron at the University of British Columbia to design remote handling tools for radioactive experiments.

In December 1980 Cameron's relative, Neil Squire, was involved in a motor vehicle accident that left him paralyzed from the neck down and unable to speak. With an old teletype machine, Cameron put his engineering background to use and designed the "sip-and-puff" system that allowed Squire to communicate. By "sipping and puffing" in Morse code, Squire's words were made visible on a screen. From these efforts, the Neil Squire Society's first program, Computer Comfort, was born.

Cameron continued to work with Squire and other people with disabilities, teaching them to use computers to increase their independence. He was soon aided by a group of dedicated volunteers, and in 1984, after the death of Squire, this group was named the Neil Squire Foundation. The foundation was later renamed the Neil Squire Society and has since gone on to help thousands of persons with disabilities increase their independence.

Cameron was diagnosed with stomach cancer in October 1990. Though he was told he only had three months to live, he continued to work with the foundation until his death on March 13, 1993.

== Awards and honours ==
In 1994, Cameron was posthumously inducted into the Terry Fox Hall of Fame.
