= Sarah Thompson (athlete) =

Canadian powerlifter and athlete

Personal information
- Born: Sarah Lucy Gentile
- Died: August 23, 2010

Sport
- Country: Canada
- Sport: Athletics, Powerlifting
- Disability: Visual impairment

Sarah Lucy Thompson (née Gentile; died August 23, 2010) was a Canadian athlete and powerlifter. Throughout her career, Thompson set multiple records in powerlifting and athletics. She was inducted into the Belleville Sports Hall of Fame in 1987 and the Terry Fox Hall of Fame in 2000.

== Early life and education ==
Thompson was born in Picton, Ontario.

== Career ==
In 1974, Thompson had a stroke that resulted in paralysis and low vision. After she became visually impaired, Thompson started her sports career in 1978. She first became a track and field athlete and participated at the Games for the Physically Disabled. Thompson expanded her sports career to powerlifting in 1984. As a powerlifter, she won ten Canadian powerlifting championships. Thompson was named the Best Athlete of the Year by the Ontario Blind Sports Association in 1987 and won a gold medal at the 1991 World Championship for the Blind.

Throughout her career, Thompson set Canadian and world records in both athletics and powerlifting for blind sports. In 1982, she set multiple Canadian records in athletics including the 100 m dash, shot put and long jump. Alternatively, Thompson broke various powerlifting world records in the deadlift and bench press.

== Awards and honours ==
In 1987, Thompson was inducted into the Belleville Sports Hall of Fame and later named to the Terry Fox Hall of Fame in 2000. Medals that Thompson were awarded include a legacy award for the International Year of Older Persons and the 125th Anniversary of the Confederation of Canada Medal.

== Personal life ==
Thompson married in 1949 and had two kids.

== Death ==
On August 23, 2010, Thompson died at Belleville General Hospital.
