= Sarah Thompson (physicist) =

British physicist

Sarah Thompson MBE
- Education: Durham University (PhD)
- Scientific career
- Fields: Condensed matter physics
- Workplaces: University of York
- Thesis: The magnetic properties of plastically deformed steels (1991)
- Doctoral advisor: Brian Keith Tanner

Sarah Madeleine Thompson MBE is a British physicist. Thompson is associate dean (research) for the Faculty of Science at the University of York. She was head of the Department of Physics at the University of York from 2011 to 2017. She is a fellow of the Institute of Physics and she was Vice President of Institute of Physics (science and innovation) until 2019.

Her research primarily focuses on thin film magnetic materials and nano-thermal imaging. She won an award from the Institute of Physics for the Public Awareness of Physics.

== Education ==
Thompson completed her Ph.D. in 1991 at Durham University with a thesis entitled The magnetic properties of plastically deformed steels.

== Career and research ==
Thompson works on magnetic thin films and spintronics at the University of York. She first arrived at the university in 1992 as a postdoctoral fellow. From 1994 to 1999, she held a EPSRC Advanced Fellowship. She was Head of the Department of Physics from 2011 to 2017.

Her main research interests are magnetic thin films and multilayers, spin-dependent transport, spintronics, remote sensing of magnetoresistance and infra-red spectroscopy of magnetic thin films and multilayers and nanoscale thermal transport. By working on the nanoscale, it is possible to manipulate the electron, which is the ultimate nano-magnet, and thereby design new functional magnetic materials with practical uses and to explore the underpinning physics.

She works as part of internal university committees, national and international committees. These include the University of York Planning Committee, the Royal Society Research Appointment Panel A(i) from 2016 to 2021, and the Scientific Advisory Committee to the European School of Magnetism from 2018 to 2024.

She participates in initiatives to increase representation of women and minorities in physics. She was a speaker at CUWiP UK in 2017 at Oxford, and in 2020 was part of the organising committee for the event when it was held at York. Under her direction as Head, the Department of Physics at York received an Athena Swan Charter Silver award in 2012 in recognition of their support for women in science.

Thompson is very involved in science communication and outreach. She gave a Kelvin Lecture in 1998 on Designer Magnetic Materials and has exhibited at the Royal Society Summer Exhibition. She also does teaching at the University of York, including modules on thermal physics, solid state physics and magnetism.

She also served on Strategic Advisory Teams of the Engineering and Physical Sciences Research Council for a total of nine years.

== Awards and honours ==
Thompson was made a Member of the British Empire (MBE) in 2012 for services to Higher Education.

Thompson regularly performed a dialogue entitled Is Science Chaotic? with other members of the University of York's physics department between 1990 and 2000. The troupe were awarded a Public Awareness of Physics award from the Institute of Physics for the project.
