= Mona Winberg =

Canadian journalist and disability rights activist

- Born: Mona Fleur Winberg; 27 January 1932; Toronto, Ontario, Canada
- Died: 19 January 2009 (aged 76); Toronto, Ontario, Canada
- Occupations: journalist, disability rights activist
- Years active: 1954–2009

Mona Winberg, CM (27 January 1932 – 19 January 2009) was a Canadian journalist and disability rights activist. Concerned over policies that discuss disabilities or promote accessibility and independence, Winberg began writing for the Ontario Federation for Cerebral Palsy and eventually became the first disabled person to serve as president of the organization. In the 1980s, she approached the Toronto Sun about the lack of media coverage on disability issues and they hired her to write a weekly column. She was honored with the King Clancy Award and was inducted into the Terry Fox Hall of Fame by the Canadian Foundation for Physically Disabled Persons and a recipient of the Order of Canada.

== Early life ==
Mona Fleur Winberg was born on 27 January 1932 in Toronto, Ontario, Canada to Sarah (née Sadie Keller) and Max Winberg. She was the fourth and final child in the family. Her father, a farmer, was born in Poland and her mother, a telephone operator, was born in Hungary. Both were Jewish. Soon after birth, Winberg was diagnosed with athetoid cerebral palsy and her parents were encouraged to place her in an institution. Her mother refused and raised her at home and though Winberg had mobility problems and limited speech and hearing, she attended Wellesley Orthopaedic School. Her father died in 1944, requiring her mother to take a job in the office of the Young Men's Hebrew Association. Her widowed maternal grandmother, Fannie (née Weis) Keller, moved in with the family to help raise the children. After completing eighth grade, Winberg was refused entry to high school, until Central Commerce High School agreed to allow her to audit classes part-time, as long as she did not appear on the official school roster. Completing her high school studies in 1952, she enrolled in journalism courses through the extension program of the University of Toronto, which she completed in 1954.

== Career ==
That same year, Winberg began her career working as a payroll clerk for Corbrook Sheltered Workshop, a recreational center and supervised work center for adults with cerebral palsy. She remained there for fourteen years. At the beginning of the 1960s, Winberg began contributing articles to the Ontario Federation for Cerebral Palsy's newsletter. In 1972, she became the first disabled person to serve as president of the organization. In the mid-1970s, she worked as the editor of Contact Magazine and became known for her advocacy of self-reliant living for disabled people through her many speaking engagements throughout the country. By the 1980s, she was advocating before the Canadian Parliament for equal rights for the disabled community and pressing for improved accessibility to public facilities.

Because little mainstream media coverage was devoted to disability issues, Winberg contacted the Toronto Sun in 1986 and proposed writing a weekly column. The newspaper accepted her proposal and her column Disabled Today appeared in the Sunday edition of the paper for the next decade. In 1988, she was honored for her column when the Canadian Foundation for Physically Disabled Persons bestowed the King Clancy Award upon her. In 1995, she was inducted into the Canadian Disability Hall of Fame. Her last Disabled Today column was written in 1999, and in 2002, she was awarded the Order of Canada by Governor General Adrienne Clarkson. She spent the next several years working on a compilation that would bring together the articles she had published in Disabled Today and her life story.

== Death and legacy ==
Winberg died on 19 January 2009 from complications with pneumonia. Posthumously, her book Solitary Courage: Mona Winberg and the Triumph over Disability was published by Blue Butterfly Books.
