= Sip-and-puff =

Method to send signals to a device using air pressure

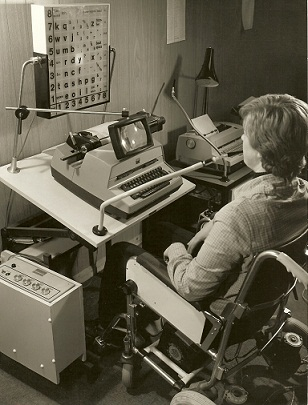
The Patient Operated Selector Mechanism (POSM or POSSUM) was developed in the early 1960s, and used a sip-and-puff control mechanism.

Sip-and-puff or sip 'n' puff (SNP) is assistive technology used to send signals to a device using air pressure by "sipping" (inhaling) or "puffing" (exhaling) on a straw, tube or "wand." It is primarily used by people who do not have the use of their hands. It is commonly used to control a motorized wheelchair by quadriplegics with very high injury to their spinal cord or people with ALS.

== Calibration and setup ==
Devices that use SNP technology require specific amounts of air pressure to be "sipped" or "puffed" by the user. These amounts of pressure are typically denoted as a hard sip/hard puff or soft sip/soft puff, however other terminologies might exist. Note that the words "hard" and "soft" are relative to the user and depend on their breathing abilities. Typically, air pressure levels pertaining to hard sips/puffs and soft sips/puffs are set through an initial calibration of the pressure sensor completed before the user starts to use their SNP device. With the assistance of an aid or technician, the user will program the SNP device to recognize their body's ability to produce hard sips/puffs and soft sips/puffs. Once this calibration process is complete, the SNP device will only recognize the user specific sips and puffs that have been saved into the SNP device.

== Motorized wheelchair control ==
Typical applications of Sip-and-Puff devices are for control of a motorized wheelchair. Control typically consists of four different inputs from the user. An initial hard puff will enable the wheelchair to move forward, while a hard sip will stop the wheelchair. Conversely, an initial hard sip will enable the wheelchair to move backward, while a hard puff will stop the wheelchair. A continuous soft sip or soft puff will enable the wheelchair to move left or right respectively depending on how long the user blows into the tube, straw or "wand".

== Computer input device ==
The mouth-controlled input provides users a simple and effective way to control mouse movement. Movement and operation of this joystick is similar to that of a mouth stick. Mouse button clicking is accomplished with the help of sips or puffs function of the joystick.

A sip-and-puff input device combined with computer accessibility software means many keyboard-accessible programs can be used with this device.

New devices with wireless connection such as the original ready to use all in one device, the QuadJoy, allow connection to smartphones, tablets and Laptops along with a standard computer.
