= Mary Southin =

Canadian judge (1931–2025)

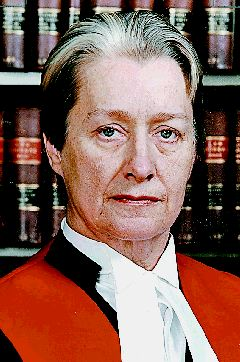
Official portrait of Mary Southin on her appointment to the British Columbia Supreme Court.

Mary Frances Southin KC (October 16, 1931 – September 24, 2025) was a Canadian judge. She was the first woman to become a Queen's Counsel in British Columbia, to be elected a Bencher of the Law Society of British Columbia, and to be a head of a law society in the Commonwealth. She was a Justice of the British Columbia Court of Appeal from 1988 to 2006.

== Biography ==
=== Legal and political career ===
Born in Vancouver, British Columbia on October 16, 1931, Southin graduated from the University of British Columbia Faculty of Law in 1952 and was called to the bar in British Columbia in 1953. She practiced in Vancouver at the firm of Shulman, Foulkes and Tupper, with a broad litigation practice. She was appointed a Queen's Counsel in 1969, the first woman so appointed in British Columbia.

She ran for the Progressive Conservative Party of Canada in the 1963 Canadian federal election in Coast—Capilano and in the 1965 Canadian federal election in Vancouver South, losing both times. A self-described "red Tory", she was also a member of the executive of the Progressive Conservative Party.

She was elected a bencher of the Law Society of British Columbia in 1971, the first woman bencher in British Columbia; she subsequently became Treasurer of the Law Society in 1977, the first woman head of a law society in the Commonwealth.

Southin died at her home in Vancouver on September 24, 2025, at the age of 93.

=== Judicial career ===
Southin was appointed to the Supreme Court of British Columbia in 1985. She was appointed to the British Columbia Court of Appeal in 1988. She retired in 2006 upon reaching the mandatory retirement age under the Constitution Act, 1867.

In 2003 she was the target of a Canadian Judicial Council investigation, following a complaint that she had brought the administration of justice into disrepute by continuing to smoke in her chambers and by convincing the Attorney General of British Columbia to install a ventilation system in her chambers: she had threatened to resign from the bench unless she was allowed to continue smoking in chambers. The complaint was dismissed for want of evidence that any misconduct had occurred.

The University of British Columbia Allard School of Law and the University of Victoria Faculty of Law host an annual lecture series on equity and legal history in her honour.

== Personality and views ==
As a judge, Southin was described as "Prodigiously learned in the law and "well known for her vast knowledge, her strong opinions, and her insistence on precision and proper form in the court." She also insisted on high sartorial standards by lawyers.

Although responsible for many legal firsts as a woman, Southin insisted on being referred to as Miss. A Canadian scholar reported that when she interviewed Southin in 1980 about sexual harassment in the legal profession, the then-lawyer "objected to the very topic." In 1978, she was attacked by some feminists when she was retained to defend Les Bewley, a judge on the Provincial Court of British Columbia, who had made sexist jokes during a trial.

A critic of the Canadian Charter of Rights and Freedoms when it was enacted, Southin wrote that "Anyone but a cretin has known for years that a charter of rights would bring political questions into the courts" and described the Charter as "a piece of Liberal silliness we could well have done without". In 2003, she said she would like to repeal the Charter, saying that it impeded the search for truth in trials.

== Notable decisions ==
In Girardet v. Crease & Co. (1987) 11 B.C.L.R. (2d) 361, 362, she wrote:

"The word 'fiduciary' is flung around now as if it applied to all breaches of duty by solicitors, directors of companies and so forth. . . . That a lawyer can commit a breach of the special duty [of a fiduciary] . . . by entering into a contract with the client without full disclosure . . . and so forth is clear. But to say that simple carelessness in giving advice is such a breach is a perversion of words."

The passage was approved by La Forest J. in Lac Minerals Ltd. v. International Corona Resources Ltd. (1989) 61 D.L.R. (4th) 14, 28 and by Millett LJ (as he then was) in the English Court of Appeal in Mothew v Bristol & West Building Society.
