= Order of precedence in British Columbia =

Relative preeminence of officials for ceremonial purposes

The British Columbia order of precedence is a nominal and symbolic hierarchy of important positions within the province of British Columbia. It has no legal standing but is used to dictate ceremonial protocol at events of a provincial nature.

1. The King in Right of British Columbia (His Majesty King Charles III)
2. The Lieutenant Governor of British Columbia (Her Honour The Honourable Wendy Lisogar-Cocchia CM OBC)
3. The Premier of British Columbia (Hon. Lorne Doerkson MLA)
4. The Chief Justice of British Columbia (Hon. Leonard Marchand Jr.)
5. Former Lieutenant Governors of British Columbia (by seniority of assuming office)
  1. Hon. Steven Point OC OBC
  2. Hon. Judith Guichon OBC
  3. Hon. Janet Austin OBC
6. Former Premiers of British Columbia (by seniority of assuming office)
  1. Bill Vander Zalm (1986–1991)
  2. Rita Johnston (1991)
  3. Mike Harcourt OC (1991–1996)
  4. Glen Clark (1996–1999)
  5. Dan Miller (1999–2000)
  6. Hon. Ujjal Dosanjh PC KC (2000–2001)
  7. Gordon Campbell OC OBC (2001–2011)
  8. Christy Clark (2011–2017)
  9. Hon. David Eby KC MLA (2022–2026)
7. The Speaker of the Legislative Assembly of British Columbia (Hon. Teresa Wat MLA)
8. The Members of the Executive Council of British Columbia by order of precedence
9. The Leader of the Official Opposition of British Columbia (Jennifer Whiteside)
10. Members of the King's Privy Council for Canada resident in British Columbia, with precedence given to members of the federal cabinet
11. The Chief Justice of the Supreme Court of British Columbia (Ron Skolrood)
12. Church representatives of faith communities
13. The Justices of the Court of Appeal of British Columbia with precedence to be governed by the date of appointment
14. The Puisne Justices of the Supreme Court of British Columbia with precedence to be governed by the date of appointment
15. The Judges of the Supreme Court of British Columbia with precedence to be governed by the date of appointment
16. The Members of the Legislative Assembly of British Columbia with precedence to be governed by the date of their first election to the legislature
17. The Chief Judge of the Provincial Court of British Columbia (Melissa Gillespie)
18. The Commander Maritime Forces Pacific (Rear-Admiral Bob Auchterlonie CMM CD)
19. The Heads of Consular Posts with jurisdiction in British Columbia with precedence to be governed by Article 16 of the Vienna Convention on Consular Relations
20. The Mayor of Victoria (Marianne Alto)
21. The Mayor of Vancouver (Pete Fry)
22. The Chancellors of the University of British Columbia, the University of Victoria and Simon Fraser University, respectively.
  1. Hon. Steven Point OBC (accorded higher ranking as a living former Lieutenant Governor of British Columbia)
  2. Marion Buller, CM
  3. Tamara Vrooman, OBC
