= Lance Finch =

Canadian judge (1938–2020)

Lance Finch QC OBC
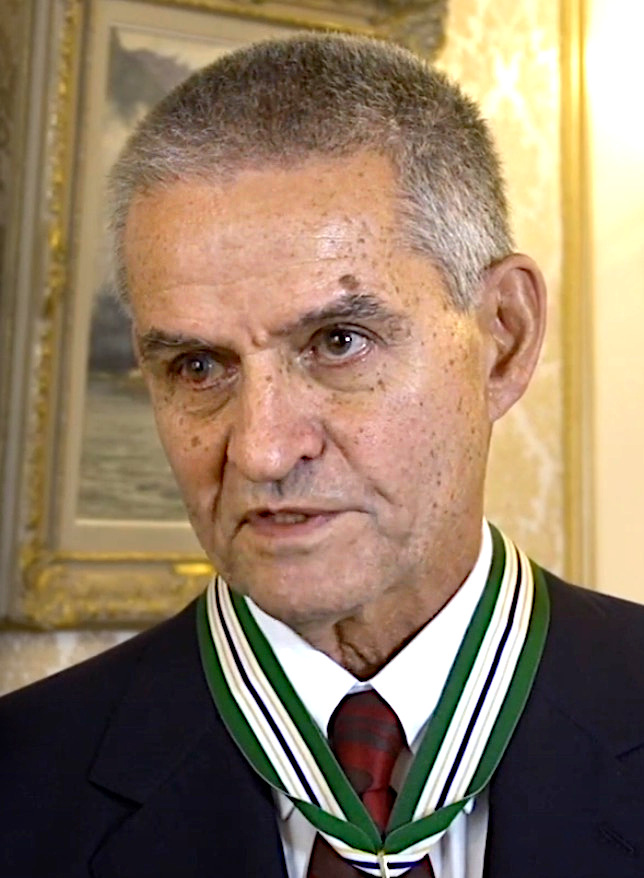

Chief Justice of British Columbia Court of Appeal
- In office June 6, 2001 – June 16, 2013
- Nominated by: Jean Chrétien
- Preceded by: Allan McEachern
- Succeeded by: Robert J. Bauman

Puisne Justice of the British Columbia Court of Appeal
- In office May 28, 1993 – June 6, 2001
- Nominated by: Brian Mulroney

Puisne Justice of the Supreme Court of British Columbia
- In office May 5, 1983 – May 28, 1993

Personal details
- Born: June 16, 1938 Edmonton, Alberta, Canada
- Died: August 30, 2020 (aged 82) North Vancouver, British Columbia, Canada
- Education: University of British Columbia
- Profession: Lawyer

Lance Sydney George Finch, QC OBC (June 16, 1938 – August 30, 2020) was a Canadian lawyer and jurist. He was President of the Vancouver Bar Association and a bencher of the Law Society of British Columbia. He was appointed as a judge in 1983 and went on to serve as the Chief Justice of the British Columbia Court of Appeal from 2001 until his retirement on June 16, 2013.

== Early life ==
Finch was born in Edmonton, Alberta, in 1938. His family moved in 1951 to Victoria, British Columbia, where he attended high school. He enrolled in Victoria College in 1955, went on to earn his undergraduate and law degree at the University of British Columbia, and was called to the bar in 1963. He was a member of the University's rowing team. He articled at Guild, Yule & Company in Vancouver, British Columbia, and became partner in 1968. He was president of the Vancouver Bar Association (1976) and served an appointment as a bencher of the Law Society of British Columbia (from 1981 to 1983). He taught at the University of British Columbia Faculty of Law and the Continuing Legal Education Program.

== Career as a judge ==
Finch was in private practice from 1963 to 1983. He was appointed to Supreme Court of British Columbia on May 5, 1983. A decade later, on May 28, 1993, he was raised to the British Columbia Court of Appeal and appointed Chief Justice on June 6, 2001.

He publicly voiced concern over access to justice for the working poor and middle class who earn too much to qualify for legal aid but not enough to afford a lawyer. He also called for the legal system to engage the narratives and laws of Indigenous Canadians "with a sense of humility".

He authored the lone dissenting opinion when, in October 2013, the Court of Appeal overturned the Carter v Canada (AG) judgment at first instance, which had found in favour of permitting assisted suicide in Canada. Finch wrote that "[t]he point at which the meaning of life is lost, when life's positive attributes are so diminished as to render life valueless, when suffering overwhelms all else, is an intensely personal decision which 'everyone' has the right to make for him or herself". The case proceeded to the Supreme Court of Canada, which agreed with Finch's position when it reversed the decision of the Court of Appeal in 2015.

Finch returned to private practice in 2013, upon reaching statutory retirement age.

== Awards ==
Finch was awarded an Honorary Law Degree, LLD, by the University of British Columbia. He was appointed to the Order of British Columbia on November 30, 2017.

== Personal life ==
Finch was married to Judy; together, they had three children. He died on August 30, 2020, surrounded by his family. He was 82, and suffered from cancer in the years leading up to his death.
