= Cadbury Schweppes Inc v. FBI Foods Ltd =

- Supreme Court of Canada

Hearing: April 20, 1998 Judgment: January 28, 1999
- Full case name: FBI Foods Ltd., FBI Brands Ltd. and Lawrence Kurlender v. Cadbury Schweppes Inc. and Cadbury Beverages Canada Inc.
- Citations: [1999] 1 SCR 142, [1999] SCJ No 6, 1999 CanLII 705 (SCC).
- Docket No.: 25778
- Prior history: Appealed from Cadbury Schweppes Inc. v. FBI Foods Ltd., [1996] BCJ No 1813, 138 DLR (4th) 682 (15 August 1996). Same case as Cadbury Schweppes Inc. v. FBI Foods Ltd., [1994] BCJ No 1191, [1994] 8 WWR 727 (25 May 1994).
- Ruling: Appeal allowed; Cross-appeal dismissed

Court membership
- Chief Justice: Antonio Lamer; Puisne Justices: Claire L'Heureux-Dubé, Charles Gonthier, Peter Cory, Beverley McLachlin, Frank Iacobucci, John C. Major, Michel Bastarache, Ian Binnie

Reasons given
- Unanimous reasons by: Binnie J.
- Lamer C.J. and Cory J. took no part in the consideration or decision of the case.

Cadbury Schweppes Inc v. FBI Foods Ltd is a Supreme Court of Canada decision on the protection of trade secrets in Canada. It also describes the difference between trade secrets and patents under Canadian law.

== Background ==
In 1969, a new cocktail known as the Bloody Caesar was created in Calgary, Alberta. The main ingredients of a Bloody Caesar are tomato juice, clam broth and vodka. Shortly thereafter, Duffy-Mott, an American juice manufacturer, began to produce and market a mixture of tomato juice, clam broth and spices under the name Clamato. The Bloody Caesar became one of the most popular cocktails in Canada, greatly increasing sales of Clamato in Canada along the way.

In 1977, Duffy-Mott decided to license the manufacturing and marketing of Clamato to British Columbian company, Caesar Canning. Duffy-Mott gave Caesar Canning information about how to manufacture Clamato. Caesar Canning used this information, along with spice packs (also received from Duffy-Mott), to produce Clamato.

Caesar Canning was able to successfully increase the market share of Clamato in Canada. With consent from Duffy-Mott, Caesar Canning entered into a sublicensing agreement with FBI Foods Ltd., which produced Clamato for the Eastern Canadian market.

In 1982, Cadbury-Schweppes purchased Duffy-Mott and only a few months later, they informed Caesar Canning they would be terminating the Clamato licensing agreement. As part of the licensing agreement, Caesar Canning had an industry-standard no-compete-type agreement, which stated that, after the licence's termination, Caesar Canning would not produce, manufacture or distribute any product "which includes amongst its ingredients, clam juice and tomato juice" for a period of five years or any product with a name ending with the letters -MATO.

In response to the loss of the licence, Caesar Canning used the formula for Clamato (which it had received from Duffy-Mott) to create a new type of mixing-juice. In order to avoid breaching the licensing agreement, the product contained tomato juice, but no clam juice. With the help of FBI Foods Ltd., Caesar Canning was able to market this juice across Canada, under various trade names. In the court reports, judges referred to all of these products collectively as Caesar Cocktail.

While the product successfully gained market share from Clamato, Caesar Canning did not survive as an independent company and declared bankruptcy in 1985.

In 1986, FBI Foods Ltd. purchased Caesar Canning's assets and continued to sell Caesar Cocktail.

Cadbury-Schweppes did not take immediate action against FBI Foods Ltd. or Caesar Canning because they believed neither company had breached the licensing agreement, given that no clam juice was used to produce Caesar Cocktail.

However, in 1986, Cadbury-Schweppes realized they might, in fact, have a case against FBI Foods Ltd. for breach of confidence. They sued FBI Foods Ltd. for having knowingly and improperly used confidential information which Cadbury-Schweppes' predecessor, Duffy-Mott had given to Caesar Canning solely for the purpose of producing Clamato under licence, not for producing its own competing product.

== Case History ==
=== Supreme Court of British Columbia ===
The case was first heard by Justice Carol Huddart of the Supreme Court of British Columbia. Justice Huddart ruled in favour of Cadbury Schweppes after applying the test for whether confidential information had been misused that was laid down by the Supreme Court of Canada in Lac Minerals Ltd. v. International Corona Resources Ltd. In that case, it was ruled that a plaintiff can recover for misuse of confidential information when the following three conditions are satisfied

- the information must have the necessary quality of confidence about it
- the information must have been imparted in circumstances in which an obligation of confidence arises
- there must have been a misuse of that information to the detriment of the confider.

In this case, Justice Huddart ruled that the Clamato recipe was confidential information and therefore worthy of protection because Duffy-Mott used time, money and effort to produce it. She then ruled that Caesar Canning and FBI Foods Ltd. had an obligation of confidence based on the licensing contract between Duffy-Mott and Caesar Canning, the common understanding in the food industry that recipes not widely known should be kept confidential and because the recipe had been communicated to Caesar Canning for the limited purpose of producing Clamato under licence. Finally, Justice Huddart ruled that Caesar Canning and FBI Foods Ltd. had misused the information because they used it to produce Caesar Cocktail, a purpose for which they had not been given the information.

Justice Huddart ruled that FBI Foods Ltd. and Caesar Canning should be liable for their misuse of Duffy-Mott's Clamato recipe. She ruled that, because Cadbury-Schweppes could not prove they had lost money due to the competition, FBI Foods, Ltd. should only be required to compensate Cadbury-Schweppes for money Caesar Canning saved by not having to develop its own recipe for Caesar Cocktail. This amount was later judged to be $29761.20. Justice Huddart did not order FBI Foods Ltd. to give all of the profits it made from Caesar Cocktail to Cadbury-Schweppes because Cadbury-Schweppes had not requested such a remedy until after she had ruled that FBI Foods Ltd. and Caesar Canning had misused their recipe. She also refused to prohibit FBI Foods, Ltd. from continuing to use the recipe on the basis that FBI Foods could have figured out how to replicate the recipe on its own and because Cadbury-Schweppes's four-year delay in bringing suit would make it unfair to require FBI Foods to discontinue producing a product that it had been producing for years.

=== British Columbia Court of Appeal ===
Both parties appealed the order of Justice Huddart to the British Columbia Court of Appeal. Cadbury-Schweppes believed that Justice Huddart should have awarded them higher damages as well as an injunction. FBI Foods Ltd. appealed Justice Huddart's ruling, arguing that the contract did not prohibit them from using the confidential recipe, only from using a recipe including both clam juice and tomato juice. They also argued that the parties did not intend the recipe to be kept confidential "for all time", and thus they should not be found liable for using it.

Justice Mary Newbury, speaking for the B.C. Court of Appeal, dismissed FBI Foods Ltd.'s appeal. She ruled that the duty of confidentiality arose outside of the written terms of the contract. Instead, it arose from the relationship between the parties when the contract was made. She also determined that, in this case, neither Caesar Canning nor FBI Foods Ltd. was ever to use the recipe to produce a copy of Clamato. If either wished to produce its own tomato juice cocktail, they should have created their own recipe.

Justice Newbury agreed with Cadbury-Schweppes and therefore ordered FBI Foods Ltd. to pay a higher level of damages and enjoined them from using the recipe to produce Caesar Cocktail.

Justice Newbury ruled that the fact that Cadbury-Schweppes did not request an accounting of FBI Foods Ltd.'s profits was because both parties had agreed to delay the determination of damages until after the determination of liability. She also ruled that forcing FBI Foods Ltd. to pay $29761.20 was insufficient, given that Cadbury-Schweppes would not have sold their recipe to FBI Foods Ltd. for this price. To allow FBI Foods Ltd. to essentially "buy" the recipe at such a low price would damage future confidential business relationships. She ruled that damages should be assessed based on the profits that Cadbury-Schweppes would have made had all sales of Caesar Cocktail for the first 12 months after it entered the market been made by Cadbury-Schweppes and not Caesar Canning.

Justice Newbury found that Caesar Canning was more blameworthy for intentionally using the recipe to copy Clamato juice than Cadbury-Schweppes was for not acting against FBI-Foods Ltd. or Caesar Canning until several years had passed, given that Cadbury-Schweppes had not realized that a remedy was available. She therefore ruled that an injunction was appropriate because a court should not countenance a "forced sale" of confidential information from one party to another.

== Supreme Court of Canada ==
FBI Foods Ltd. appealed the decision of the British Columbia Court of Appeal to the Supreme Court of Canada, arguing that the injunction and award of the first 12 months of profits from Caesar Cocktail overcompensated Cadbury-Schweppes. They claimed that any losses suffered by Cadbury-Schweppes were due to Cadbury-Schweppes's own cancellation of the licensing agreement, not from competition from Caesar Cocktail, and that therefore they should not have to provide any compensation. Cadbury-Schweppes cross-appealed, arguing that Caesar Canning and FBI Foods Ltd. had effectively "pirated" their secret recipe and that they should therefore be compensated for the full market value of the recipe, as if it had been patented.

The decision of the whole Supreme Court of Canada was written by Justice Ian Binnie. Justice Binnie agreed with the trial judge and the British Columbia Court of Appeal that FBI Foods Ltd. had misused Cadbury-Schweppes's confidential information, and that the only thing for the Supreme Court to consider was the remedy to grant Cadbury-Schweppes. He felt that it would first be necessary to examine the special nature of the misuse of confidential information as a cause of action.

Justice Binnie noted that there was no uniform way to examine the wrong done by a party that misuses the confidential information of another party. The victim of the misuse may have a claim to an equitable remedy against the misuser, as well as a cause of action under property law, contract law and tort law. The remedies available for each of these types of wrongs could differ. Rather than let every case for misuse of confidential information turn on how best to characterize a plaintiff's harm, Justice Binnie thought it best to consider misuse of confidential information as its own sui generis claim and to provide remedies based on what is most just given the particular facts of a case.

In this case, Justice Binnie felt that, for several reasons, it would not be just to impose an injunction on FBI Foods Ltd. preventing them from producing Caesar Cocktail using the recipe based on the Clamato recipe. First, he agreed with Huddart J. that Cadbury-Schweppes's delay in seeking an injunction until after FBI Foods Ltd. had invested considerably in the production of Caesar Cocktail would make an injunction unfair. Second, he felt that there was "nothing very special" about the Clamato recipe, given that any skilled juice-maker could have made a juice that tastes substantially similar to Clamato within 12 months (as he said in the judgment "Juice formulation is not rocket science"). He ruled that it would be unfair to prohibit FBI Foods Ltd. from using a recipe they could easily have re-created. Finally, he ruled that, because Cadbury-Schweppes could be adequately compensated by a monetary award, an injunction would be unnecessary.

In determining the value of the monetary award that Cadbury-Schweppes should receive, Justice Binnie rejected Cadbury-Schweppes's request to be compensated for the market value of their secret recipe for Clamato. He ruled that treating the recipe as if it were patented would be wrong, given that Cadbury-Schweppes had not fulfilled their side of the patent "bargain". If Cadbury-Schweppes had wanted patent protection, they should have made their recipe public and accepted the time-limited monopoly that a patent grants.

Justice Binnie felt that the fairest remedy would be to compensate Cadbury-Schweppes for the lost opportunity they suffered as a result of FBI Foods Ltd.'s and Caesar Canning's misuse of their recipe. Had the recipe not been misused, Cadbury-Schweppes would have had the opportunity to market Clamato in Canada without competition until Caesar Canning or FBI Foods Ltd. could figure out how to create a juice similar to Clamato. Justice Binnie agreed with the trial court that this period should be limited to 12 months. He ruled that FBI Foods Ltd. should have to compensate Cadbury-Schweppes for any profits lost due to this competition. Given that not everyone who purchased Caesar Cocktail during the 12-month period would have purchased Clamato instead, had Caesar Cocktail not been on the market, he ruled that this amount should not be based solely on the amount of Caesar Cocktail sold in the 12-month period. He directed a referee to determine an appropriate amount of damages based on Cadbury-Schweppes lost opportunity, but noted that "[m]athematical exactitude is neither required nor obtainable."

=== Aftermath ===
FBI Foods Ltd. settled the outstanding judgment from the Supreme Court of Canada with Cadbury for $300,000.

== Academic Response ==
In an article entitled "'Juice Formulation is Not Rocket Science' and Other Observations: Cadbury Schweppes Inc. v. FBI Foods Ltd.". Leonard Rotman, then a law professor at the University of Windsor, criticized the Supreme Court's decision in Cadbury Schweppes Inc. v. FBI Foods Ltd. He felt that the Supreme Court had deviated from the established principle in Brickenden v. London Loan & Savings Co. of Canada. In Brickenden, the Judicial Committee of the Privy Council (whose decisions were binding on Canada at the time of Brickenden) dealt with a situation where party in a fiduciary situation failed in its duty to disclose material facts, causing his principal to incur losses. The Council in Brickenden ruled that the fiduciary should not be able to avoid liability for those losses by arguing that, in the hypothetical case that the material facts had been disclosed, the losses would have happened anyway.

Rotman thought that the rule in Brickenden should apply to cases where someone misuses information that they received in the context of a fiduciary relationship. Had the rule in Brickenden been applied in Cadbury Schweppes, FBI Foods Ltd. would not have been able to reduce its liability by arguing that, in the hypothetical situation where FBI Foods Ltd. or Caesar Canning had formulated their own recipe for Clamato, they would have been able to do so in 12 months. By eliminating the ability of someone who breaches a duty to rely on speculative hypotheticals, Rotman felt that the following the approach in Brickenden would better deter wrongdoing than the approach used Cadbury Schweppes.
