= Courts of British Columbia =

The Canadian province of British Columbia has three courts making up its provincial court system.

- Provincial Court of British Columbia
- Supreme Court of British Columbia
- British Columbia Court of Appeal
