= Bryan Williams (Canadian lawyer) =

Canadian lawyer (1932–2025)

The Honourable Bryan Williams KC

Chief Justice of the Supreme Court of British Columbia
- In office 1996–2000
- Nominated by: Jean Chrétien
- Preceded by: William A. Esson
- Succeeded by: Donald Brenner

Justice of the Court of Appeal of British Columbia
- In office 1995–1996
- Nominated by: Jean Chrétien

58th President of the Canadian Bar Association
- In office 1986–1987
- Preceded by: Robert Wells
- Succeeded by: Jean Bazin

President of the British Columbia Branch of the Canadian Bar Association
- In office 1977–1978

Personal details
- Born: Calgary, Alberta, Canada
- Party: Liberal Party of Canada
- Spouse: Audrey Williams
- Education: University of British Columbia (LL.B)
- Profession: Lawyer

Bryan Williams KC (September 14, 1932 – September 4, 2025) was a Canadian lawyer and retired judge from Vancouver, British Columbia. He was a puisne justice on the British Columbia Court of Appeal and also Chief Justice of the British Columbia Supreme Court. In addition to an extensive litigation practice, he was heavily involved in a number of organizations relating to the practice of law and the administration of justice, including a term as national president of the Canadian Bar Association.

== Early life and family ==
Williams was born in Calgary, Alberta, but his family moved to British Columbia when he was young. He grew up on Vancouver Island and then attended law school at the University of British Columbia. His wife, Audrey Williams, was a competitive ice skater and ice skating judge, including judging at the Lillehammer Winter Olympics in 1994. They have four children together.

== Legal career ==
=== Litigation practice ===
Williams was called to the British Columbia bar in 1959. He practised law with the Vancouver firm of Swinton and Company for close to forty years, being made partner in 1961. A litigator in commercial matters, administrative and environmental law, he eventually led the firm's litigation department. He developed a very busy practice in the courts, often juggling different complicated court matters simultaneously. He appeared in major cases involving aboriginal land claims, physician billing practices, and lawyer advertising rules. He also appeared in two cases in the Supreme Court of Canada. One of them, Attorney General of Canada v Law Society of British Columbia, is a leading case on the constitutional jurisdiction of provincial superior courts, as well as the interplay between federal competition law, and provincial regulation of the legal profession.

One of his major cases was acting as counsel for the government of British Columbia in Delgamuukw v. British Columbia at the British Columbia Court of Appeal. The case was one of the most important cases relating to aboriginal title in Canada. He was asked directly by the Premier of British Columbia to argue the province's position. Williams later said it was the most interesting case of his career. The case went on appeal to the Supreme Court of Canada, but Williams was not able to act for the provincial government in the Supreme Court because by then he had been appointed to the bench.

=== Leadership at the bar ===
Williams was heavily involved in a number of organizations relating to the legal profession and the justice system. At various times he was a member of the Canadian Human Rights Tribunal; a commissioner on the British Columbia Law Reform Commission; chair of the British Columbia Legal Aid Society; and Governor of the British Columbia Law Foundation. He also served as permanent chair of a number of arbitration committees under various collective bargaining agreements.

Upon the expiry of his term on the Law Reform Commission, the Commission paid tribute to him in their annual report: "Mr Williams brought to our deliberations a wealth of experience as senior counsel. His intuitive grasp of complex issues combined with a keen appreciation of the practical consequences of law reform measures made him a tower of strength in our deliberations."

Williams was heavily involved in the Canadian Bar Association throughout his legal career. He was the president of the British Columbia Branch of the CBA in 1977-78, and the national president of the CBA in 1986-87. In 1983-84, he was the chair of the CBA National Law Reform and Legislation Committee and in 1984-85, he was the founding chair of the CBA Law for the Future Fund.

One of his friends, Richard Vogel, a former Deputy Attorney General for British Columbia, commented that Williams "... has lectured, published and generally made waves on numberless platforms and podiums."

=== Politics ===
Williams was a long-time supporter of the federal Liberal Party and a personal friend of Prime Minister Jean Chrétien. At the provincial level, he was involved in the British Columbia Social Credit Party.

=== Environmental issues ===
Williams has a strong interest in the environment and the wilderness. He was a member and director of the World Wildlife Fund Canada. In 1985, the provincial government appointed him the chair of the Wilderness Advisory Committee established by the provincial government. The Committee recommended the creation of several new wilderness parks and also changes to the boundaries of some existing parks, such as South Moresby Island. In 1995, he was appointed Canada's special advisor in relation to the North American Commission for Environmental Cooperation, established as part of the North American Free Trade Agreement. In the spring of 1995, the provincial government again relied on his services, appointing him a Special Commissioner to review the issue of the public usage of the Cypress Park, which had become controversial over the conflicting interests of conservation and economic development. He made his report to the provincial Cabinet in August, 1995.

=== Other Activities ===
Williams was on the board of Air BC, a regional subsidiary of Air Canada. He was also the chair of the YVR (Vancouver airport) Art Foundation, and a director of the Laurier Institution.

== Judicial career ==
Williams was appointed a puisne justice of the British Columbia Court of Appeal in 1995. He was only on the Court of Appeal for a short time, as a year later he was appointed Chief Justice of the British Columbia Supreme Court, the superior trial court.

In 2000, after four years as Chief Justice, Williams resigned from the Supreme Court. The circumstances of the resignation were not clear. There were rumours that nude pictures had been found on Williams's computer. He denied those rumours, saying that someone had e-mailed the images to him and he deleted them as quickly as possible. He was quoted as saying that the reason for the resignation was friction with the executive committee of the judges of the Supreme Court. News reports at the time indicated there may have been dissatisfaction with his leadership style in pushing for reforms to the court system.

When contacted before the resignation was confirmed, the Attorney General of British Columbia, Ujjal Dosanjh, said that the resignation would be considered a loss by the legal community. Dosanjh said that the Chief Justice was seen as a champion of the underdog, and had pushed hard to implement innovations in the court system, such as alternative dispute resolution and video conferencing.

The President of the Law Society of British Columbia praised Williams for pushing for reforms to the court process, which were aimed at making the court process more accessible, faster and cheaper. He said: "It takes courage to initiate change. Chief Justice Williams retires knowing that he has the admiration and respect of the Law Society, and with a distinguished career of service as a lawyer, jurist and Chief Justice."

A well-known political commentator, Rafe Mair, criticized the lack of transparency about the reasons for the resignation.

== ICBC Fairness Commissioner ==
In 2000, the President of ICBC, Thom Thompson, approached Williams with the idea of an ICBC ombudsman (later to be known as the ICBC Fairness Commissioner). This was to be an independent commissioner to hear and assess complaints from certain customers of Insurance Corporation of British Columbia, and determine whether they had been fairly treated in their dealings with the Corporation.

Williams accepted the appointment and commenced business as the Fairness Commissioner on March 1, 2001. He served in this position until 2004.

== Honours ==
- 1990 - awarded an LLD (honoris causa) by the University of Victoria.
- Awarded Queen's Counsel
