= Leonard Marchand Jr. =

Canadian judge

The Honourable Leonard Marchand

Chief Justice of British Columbia and Chief Justice of the Court of Appeal of Yukon
- Incumbent
- Assumed office December 8, 2023
- Nominated by: Justin Trudeau (Note: On the recommendation of Minister of Justice Arif Virani.)
- Appointed by: Mary Simon
- Preceded by: Robert J. Bauman

Puisne Justice of the British Columbia Court of Appeal
- In office March 24, 2021 – December 8, 2023
- Nominated by: Justin Trudeau (Note: On the recommendation of Minister of Justice David Lametti.)
- Appointed by: Richard Wagner (Note: As Administrator of the Government while the office of Governor General was vacant.)
- District: Vancouver

Puisne Justice of the Supreme Court of British Columbia
- In office June 21, 2017 – March 24, 2021
- Nominated by: Justin Trudeau (Note: On the recommendation of Minister of Justice Jody Wilson-Raybould.)
- Appointed by: David Johnston
- District: Kelowna

Judge of the Provincial Court of British Columbia
- In office 2013–2017

Personal details
- Education: University of Victoria
- Profession: Lawyer

Leonard Marchand is the Chief Justice of the Court of Appeal of British Columbia and Chief Justice of the Court of Appeal of Yukon. Since the Court of Appeal is the highest court in British Columbia, the position can be titled as simply the "Chief Justice of British Columbia." He is the first person of Indigenous (First Nations) identity to hold the post of Chief Justice. He is the son of Donna Marchand (nee Parr) and politician Leonard Marchand.

== Early life ==
Marchand is Syilx and a member of the Okanagan Indian Band. He grew up in Kamloops, B.C.

He graduated from the University of British Columbia in 1986 with a B.A.Sc. in chemical engineering. He worked in the oil industry for five years before attending law school at the University of Victoria, graduating in 1994.

== Career ==
From 1995 to 2013, he practiced law at Fulton & Company LLP in Kamloops, where his practice focused on the liability of public authorities, including by advancing civil claims for abuses suffered by residential school survivors.

Notably, in 2005, he helped negotiate and was a signatory to the Indian Residential Schools Settlement Agreement. He served on the Oversight Committee for the Independent Assessment Process and on the Chief Adjudicator's Reference Group.

Marchand was asked to serve on the Selection Committee to make recommendations on appointments to the Truth and Reconciliation Commission.

In 2013, he was appointed to the Provincial Court of British Columbia. He was appointed to the Supreme Court of British Columbia in 2017. He also presided in Kamloops Cknucwentn First Nations Sentencing Court in Kamloops. In 2021, he was appointed to the British Columbia Court of Appeal.

In December 2023, Marchand was appointed Chief Justice of British Columbia and the Chief Justice of the Court of Appeal of Yukon.
