= Robert J. Bauman =

Canadian judge

The Honourable Robert J. Bauman

Chief Justice of British Columbia Court of Appeal
- In office June 16, 2013 – October 1, 2023
- Nominated by: Stephen Harper
- Monarchs: Elizabeth II; Charles III
- Premier: Christy Clark; John Horgan; David Eby
- Preceded by: Lance Finch
- Succeeded by: Leonard Marchand Jr.

Chief Justice of the Supreme Court of British Columbia
- In office September 9, 2009 – June 16, 2013
- Nominated by: Stephen Harper
- Premier: Gordon Campbell; Christy Clark

Puisne Justice of the British Columbia Court of Appeal
- In office 2008 – September 9, 2009

Puisne Justice of the Supreme Court of British Columbia
- In office 1996–2008

Personal details
- Born: 1950 (age 75–76) Toronto, Ontario
- Education: University of Toronto
- Profession: Lawyer

Robert J. Bauman is a Canadian jurist who served as the Chief Justice of British Columbia and Chief Justice of the Court of Appeal for the Yukon from 2013-2023. Prior to his appointment as the Chief Justice of British Columbia, he served as the Chief Justice of the Supreme Court of British Columbia. Mr. Bauman was appointed to the Order of British Columbia in 2026 .

Order of precedence
Preceded by David Eby as Premier of British Columbia	Order of precedence in British Columbia as of 2022	Succeeded by Iona Campagnolo as 27th Lieutenant Governor of British Columbia
