= PCBC =

PCBC may refer to:

- Pembroke College Boat Club (Cambridge)
- Pembroke College Boat Club (Oxford)
- Philippine Chinese Baptist Convention
- Propagating cipher-block chaining, mode of encryption for block ciphers; see Block cipher mode of operation#Propagating Cipher Block Chaining (PCBC)
- Provincial Court of British Columbia
- People's Construction Bank of China
