= Archer Martin (judge) =

Archer Evans Stringer Martin was a Canadian lawyer and judge. He was Chief Justice of British Columbia from 1937 to 1940.

== Biography ==
Born in Hamilton, Canada West in 1865, Archer Martin was the second son of Edward Martin, QC, LLD, the grandson of the Irish politician Richard Martin. He was educated at Trinity College School, Port Hope, and in Ghent in Belgium. He was called to the Manitoba Bar in 1887 and moved to Victoria, British Columbia around 1894.

A Liberal in politics, he was appointed by Sir Wilfrid Laurier to the Supreme Court of British Columbia in 1898, a Deputy Judge in Admiralty for British Columbia in 1899, and Judge in Admiralty for British Columbia in 1902. He was appointed to the British Columbia Court of Appeal on its establishment in 1910. Appointed Chief Justice of British Columbia in 1937, he retired in 1940.

Martin has the distinction of being the last Canadian judge to wear a wig in court. The wearing of wigs was abolished by statute in British Columbia in 1905, but Martin insisted that the province had no jurisdiction to dictate his court dress when sitting in his Admiralty jurisdiction. Hence, he and counsel appearing in front of him in Admiralty cases continued to wear wigs.
