= Alexander Campbell DesBrisay =

Alexander Campbell DesBrisay may refer to:

- Alexander Campbell DesBrisay (politician)
- Alexander Campbell DesBrisay (judge)
