= Shigetaka Sasaki =

Japanese and Canadian judoka

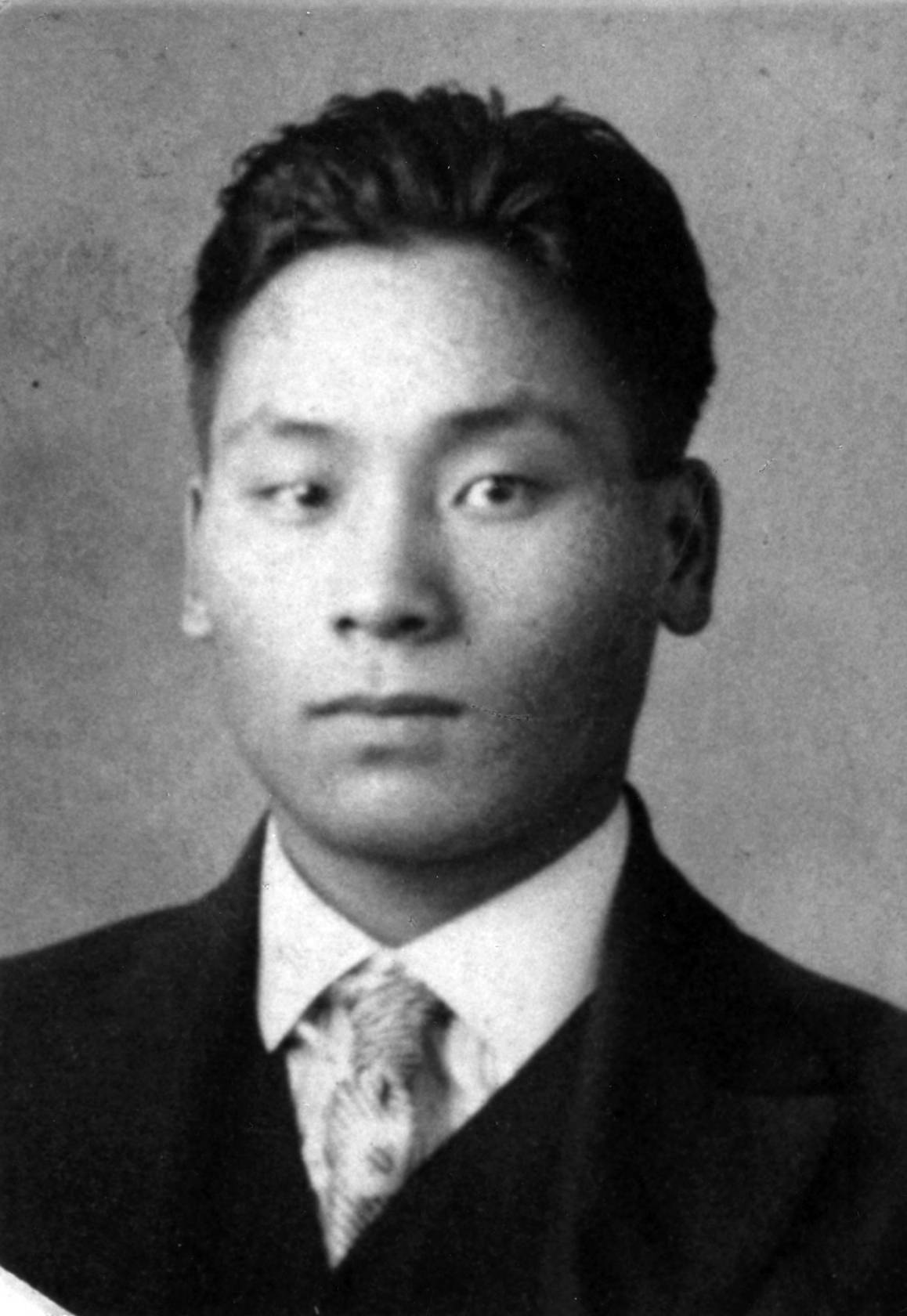
- Photo of Sasaki taken around 1930

Personal information
- Nickname: Steve
- Born: 20 March 1903 Tottori, Japan
- Died: 26 February 1993 (aged 89) Vancouver, British Columbia, Canada
- Occupation: Judoka

Sport
- Country: Canada
- Sport: Judo
- Rank: 8th dan black belt
- Club: Tai Iku Dojo / Kidokan; Tashme Judo Club; Ashcroft Judo Club
- Coached by: Jigoro Kano; Kyuzo Mifune

Shigetaka "Steve" Sasaki (佐々木 繁孝, 20 March 1903 – 26 February 1993) was a Japanese and Canadian judoka who founded the first judo club in Canada and is considered the 'Father of Canadian Judo'. After establishing the Tai Iku Dojo in Vancouver in 1924, Sasaki and his students opened several branch schools in British Columbia and also trained RCMP officers until 1942, when Japanese Canadians were expelled from the Pacific coast and either interned or forced to move elsewhere in Canada due to fears that they were a threat to the country after Japan entered the Second World War. When the war was over, the government required interned Japanese Canadians to either resettle in Canada outside of British Columbia's 'Japanese exclusion zone' (within 100 miles of the Pacific coast) or emigrate to Japan.

Sasaki stayed in Canada, resettling in Ashcroft, British Columbia, and many of his students went on to establish their own dojos across the country. The Canadian Kodokan Black Belt Association (CKBBA), now known as Judo Canada, was chartered in 1956 with Sasaki as its president. He stepped down from the presidency in 1959, but continued to teach at his Ashcroft dojo and visit other clubs around the country as a guest instructor, and he spent much of his time helping Vancouver's dojos after retiring there in 1968.

In 1984 Sasaki was promoted to hachidan (eighth dan), and in 1986 he was elected to the Canadian Olympic Hall of Fame and decorated with the Order of the Rising Sun, Silver Rays by the Emperor of Japan for his dedication to promoting judo in Canada. He had taught for nearly 70 years by the time of his death in 1993 at age 89, and was posthumously inducted into the B.C. Sports Hall of Fame in 1995 and the Judo Canada Hall of Fame in 1996.

== Early life ==
Sasaki was born in Tottori, Japan on 20 March 1903. His early life is not well-documented, but he began studying judo at the age of 12 and was promoted to shodan (black belt, first dan) at 17 and nidan (second dan) by 19. He was the judo champion of his prefecture when he graduated from Tottori High School, and worked as a judo instructor at Yonago High School. He also studied bone-setting as a supplement to his judo training.

Sasaki emigrated from Japan to Vancouver in 1922 at the age of 19 and worked as a shop assistant to study business. The shop appears to have been Nagami's Confectionary Store at 423 Powell Street, owned by Mrs. Haruyo Nagami (永見 春代), who is related to Sasaki and was also born in Tottori. Sasaki eventually became the owner of Nagami's Confectionary, and he appears to have spent at least 20 years of his business career as a confectioner, buying Suzuki's Kashi Ten (another confectionary store) at 357 Powell Street in 1941.

== Tai Iku Dojo / Kidokan ==
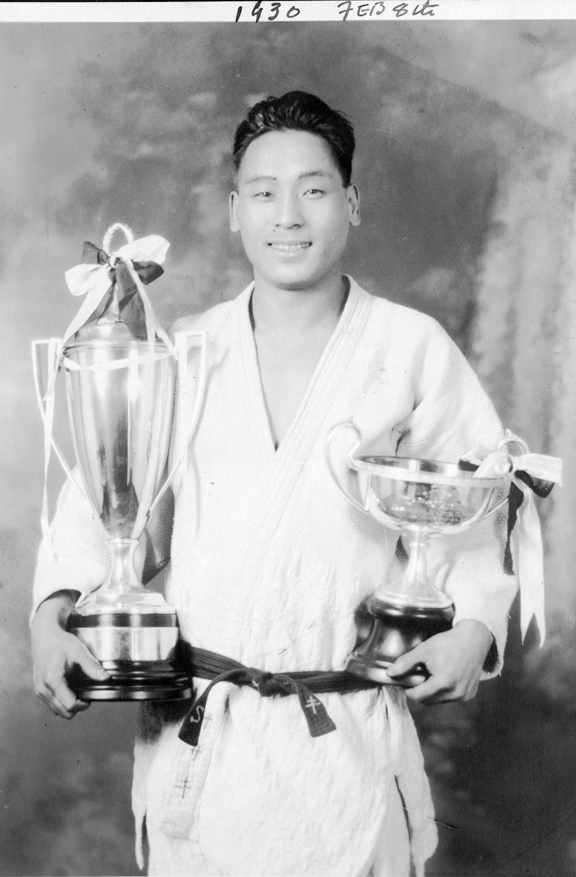
Sasaki with two trophies in 1930

In 1923 Sasaki began attending judo-versus-wrestling matches in Vancouver and was extremely disappointed to discover that they were fixed and badly misrepresented judo. He held a meeting with the local Japanese community to gauge their interest in establishing a non-profit dojo that adhered to judo's two fundamental principles: seiryoku zen'yō (精力善用, 'maximum efficiency, minimum effort' in Japanese) and jita kyōei (自他共栄, 'mutual welfare and benefit'). After a year of planning, meetings, and fundraising, Sasaki opened Tai Iku Dojo (体育道場, 'physical education training hall') in 1924.

It was difficult to secure an appropriate location and the first practices were held in the living room of Kanzo Ui, one of the dojo's sponsors, at 500 Alexander Street in Vancouver. A few months later it was relocated to a larger location in the 500 block of Powell Street (the dojo appears to have had more than one address on Powell Street over the years, and was recorded as 403 Powell in 1932). Over the next several years new branches of Tai Iku Dojo were established in Steveston (where Tomoaki Doi and Takeshi Yamamoto had already started a club but asked for Sasaki's help), Kitsilano, Fairview, Haney, Mission, Woodfibre, Chemainus, Victoria, Duncan, Whonnock, Hammond, and Vernon. Sasaki or his assistants helped with the instruction at all of the clubs.

=== RCMP training ===
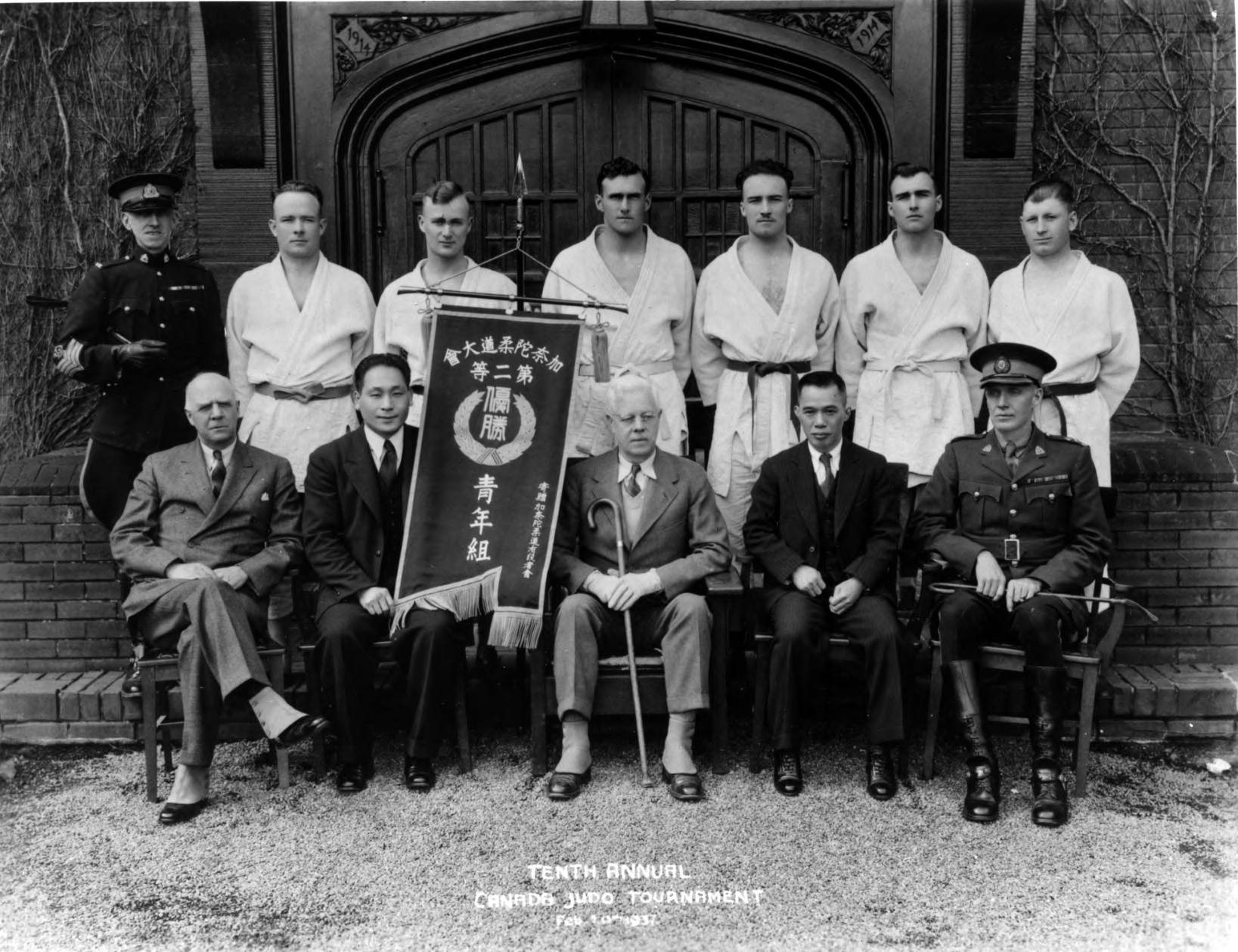
RCMP participants and officials at the 10th Annual Canadian Judo Championships in Vancouver in 1937. Front row, left to right: Superintendent Fowell, Shigetaka Sasaki, Assistant Commissioner Cadiz, Etsuji Morii, and Inspector Genan

For nearly a decade all of the judoka at Tai Iku Dojo's various branches were ethnically Japanese. In 1932, however, the commissioner of the Vancouver Royal Canadian Mounted Police (RCMP) detachment attended a judo tournament and was so impressed that he replaced his officers' boxing and wrestling training with judo. Sasaki saw this as an important opportunity to promote judo throughout Canada and taught the initial cohort of eleven RCMP officers personally at the detachment gymnasium at 33rd Avenue & Heather Street, on the site now known as the Heather Street Lands. This helped generate more interest in judo, and people from outside the Japanese Canadian community began participating in tournaments in 1933. In 1936 Sasaki promoted all eleven officers in the first cohort to shodan, and in 1937 a six-man team of RCMP judoka placed second in a tournament. RCMP judo training ceased in 1941 after Japan entered the Second World War.

=== Work with Jigoro Kano ===
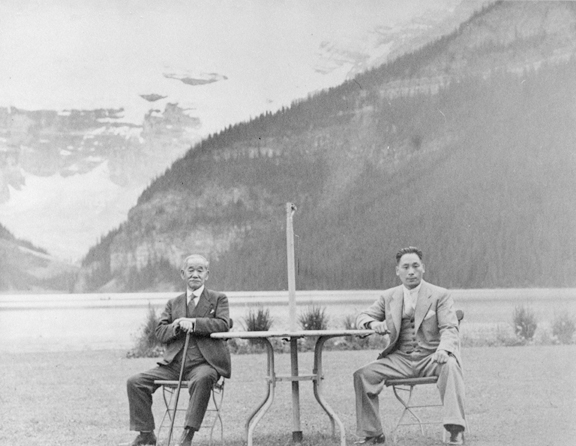
Jigoro Kano and Shigetaka Sasaki at Lake Louise, Alberta on their way to the Berlin Olympics in 1936

Jigoro Kano, the founder of judo who was also an accomplished professional educator and a member of Japan's House of Peers, visited Canada three times. During the first visit in 1932, when Kano was on his way back to Japan from the 1932 Summer Olympics in Los Angeles, he honoured Tai Iku Dojo by renaming it Kidokan (気道館, 'place of intrinsic energy' in Japanese), and all other dojos in British Columbia became branches of Kidokan. The second visit was in 1936, during which he asked Sasaki to accompany him to Berlin to make a presentation to the International Olympic Committee (IOC) and participate in a subsequent judo demonstration tour in Germany, France, England, the United States, and Canada. Sasaki had to return to Vancouver after a month in Berlin to attend to his business and judo obligations. Kano's last visit to Canada was in 1938, on his way home from meetings with the IOC in Cairo. He died of pneumonia later that year on the Hikawa Maru, mid-voyage from Vancouver to Yokohama.

== World War II and the Tashme Internment Camp ==
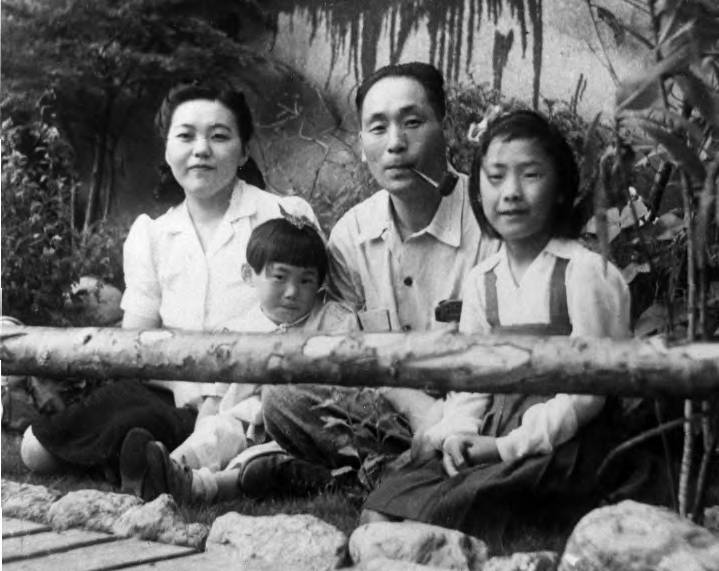
Sasaki and his family about two years before they were forcibly relocated to Tashme Internment Camp

Japan's attack on Pearl Harbor on 7 December 1941 began the war between the Japanese Empire and the Allies, including Canada. This sparked fears of a Japanese invasion on the Pacific coast in a context of already long-standing anti-Asian racism (Japantown was targeted during the 1907 anti-Asian riots in Vancouver, and most Japanese Canadians did not have the right to vote until 1949, for example). On 25 February 1942 the federal government invoked the War Measures Act to order the removal of all Japanese Canadians residing within 100 miles (160 km) of the Pacific coast, even though about 77% of them were British subjects (Canadian citizenship was not instituted until 1946) and 61% were Canada-born nisei.

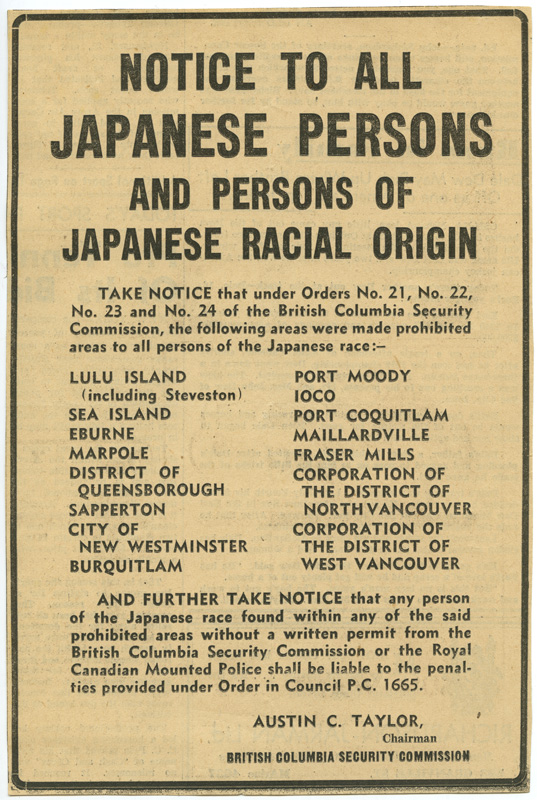
British Columbia Security Commission Japanese internment notice (1942)

21,000 Japanese Canadians (over 90% of the Japanese Canadian population), including Sasaki and his family, were expelled from their homes, and their property and personal possessions were confiscated by the Custodian of Enemy Property—including the confectionary store that Sasaki had bought just a year before.

700 men labelled as 'troublemakers' were sent to Prisoner of War Camp 101 in Angler, Ontario near Neys Provincial Park, 2,150 single men were sent to road labour camps, 3,500 people signed contracts to work on sugar beet farms outside British Columbia to avoid internment, and 3,000 were permitted to settle away from the coast at their own expense. The remaining 12,000 were relocated to government internment camps in the BC interior or elsewhere in Canada. Sasaki and his family were relocated to Tashme Internment Camp near Hope, British Columbia.

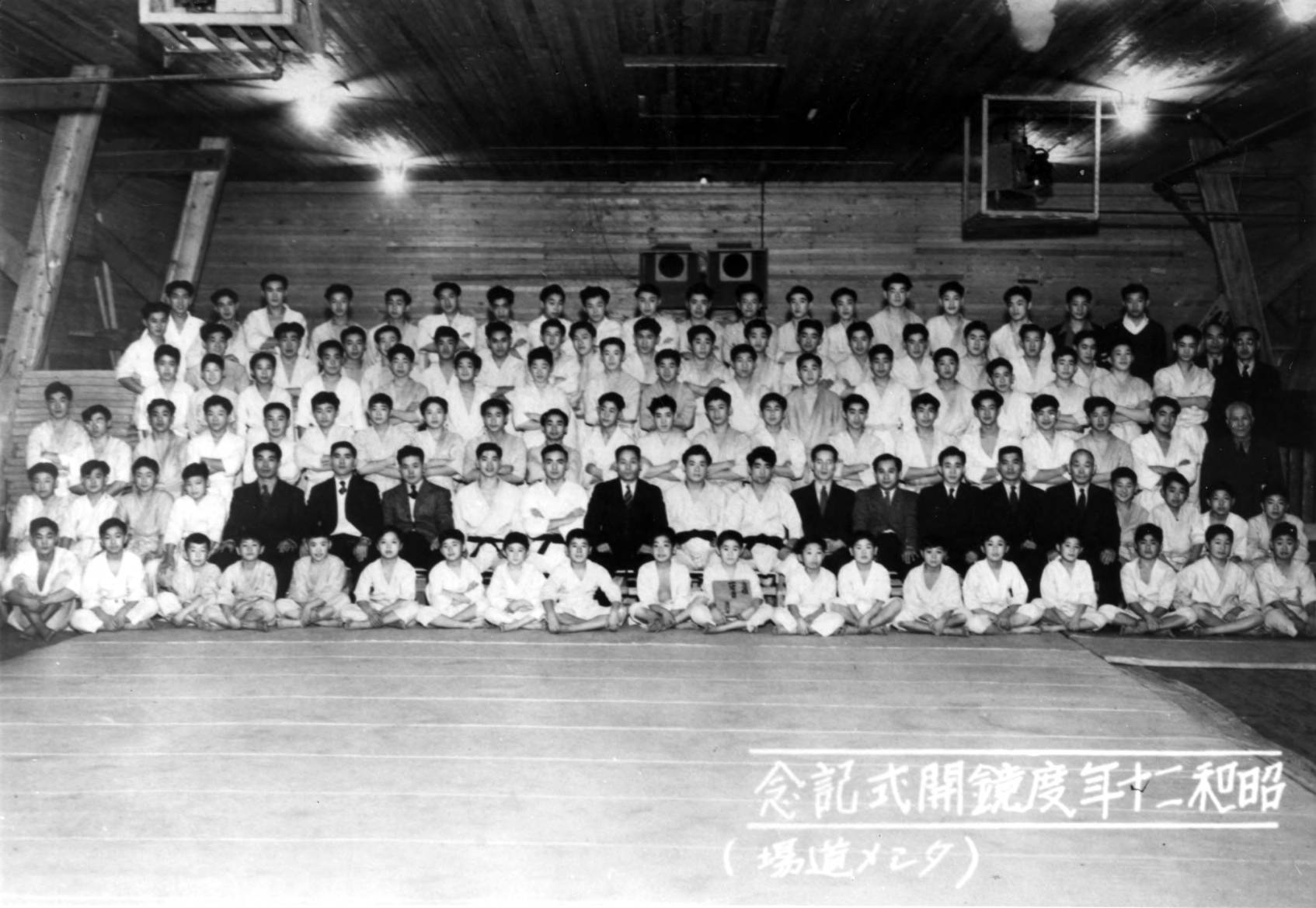
Judoka celebrating kagami biraki at Tashme Internment Camp in 1945 (Sasaki is the suited man in the centre of the second row)

Judo played an important role in the life of many internees, and there were well-attended dojos at three camps: Tashme Internment Camp, Popoff Internment Camp in the Slocan Valley, British Columbia, and the Prisoner of War (POW) camp in Angler. Tashme, where Sasaki was head instructor, was the largest of the BC internment camps and many judoka were held there, reportedly at Sasaki's request and out of respect for his work with the RCMP.

=== Resettlement after the war ===
When the war ended in 1945 the government gave interned Japanese Canadians two options: resettlement outside of the exclusion zone in British Columbia or 'voluntary repatriation' to Japan (despite the fact that most Japanese Canadians had been born in Canada). The majority agreed to move elsewhere in Canada, but approximately 10,000 refused to move and the government issued an order to deport them. 4,000 people were deported to Japan before the policy was abandoned due to public opposition. The Japanese exclusion zone remained in effect until 1949 and judo did not return to the Pacific coast until two years later. By then most Japanese Canadians had established themselves in other places, and there was nothing to go back to anyway because the Custodian of Enemy Property had sold all of their property and belongings.

Sasaki and his family were relocated to Ashcroft, British Columbia in 1946. Few employers there were willing to hire a middle-aged Japanese man, so Sasaki and his wife Sumye started a commercial laundry service for hotels and mining companies. He opened a dojo in Ashcroft in 1948. In 1949 Sasaki participated in the 'Royal Commission to Investigate Property Claims of Canadian Citizens of Japanese Origin Evacuated from Coast Areas of British Columbia in 1942' (1947–50, also known as the 'Bird Commission' because it was headed by Justice Henry Irvine Bird), and received modest financial compensation for some aspects of his family's dispossession.

== Organizing judo across Canada ==
Before the war, Sasaki's Tai Iku Dojo / Kidokan was the de facto governing body of judo in Canada since nearly every dojo in the country was one of its branches. Circumstances were different after the war and in 1946 Atsumu Kamino, who had helped Sasaki teach judo at Tashme, established the Canada Judo Yudanshakai (black belt association) in Toronto to help organize the administration of judo, including grading. Three years later, however, Bernard Gauthier of Hull, Quebec created the Canadian Judo Federation (CJF) and had it chartered as Canada's official judo organization, which was recognized by the International Judo Federation (IJF) in 1952. Gauthier was not associated with the Japanese Canadians who had established judo in Canada or the Kodokan. There was some cooperation between the two organizations, but the Yudanshakai decided to reorganize in 1956 when Gauthier alone represented Canada at the first World Judo Championships in Tokyo.

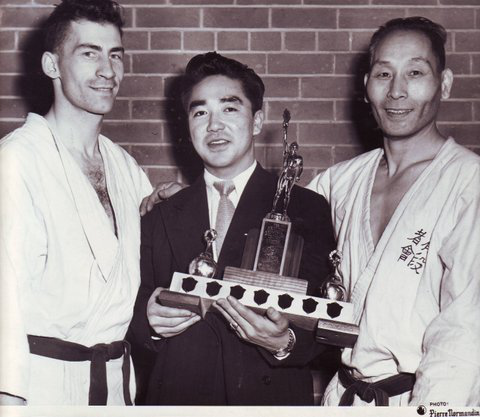
Bernard Gauthier, Masao Takahashi, and Shigetaka Sasaki at the first CJF National Championships, held in Ottawa in 1952

The Canadian Kodokan Black Belt Association (CKBBA) was chartered in 1956, with Sasaki as its president; its name used 'Kodokan' instead of 'Judo' to differentiate it from Gauthier's organization and give it authority. In 1958, reportedly after the IJF was unable to contact Gauthier, the CKBBA provided last-minute representation at that year's World Judo Championships. Sasaki travelled to Tokyo to make that CKBBA's case to the IJF, and the CKBBA was granted membership in the IJF and replaced the Canadian Judo Federation as the sole official governing body of judo in Canada. Nevertheless, when the International Olympic Committee announced in 1960 that judo would be included in the 1964 Summer Olympics in Tokyo, Gauthier lobbied the Canadian Olympic Association (COA) to allow his organization to select the judoka who would represent Canada at the Games. The COA held a hearing to determine which organization should have jurisdiction, and decided in favour of the CKBBA because it had members across the country and Gauthier's Federation was essentially limited to Quebec. The CKBBA has remained the official governing body of judo in Canada since that decision, and legally adopted its long-standing common name Judo Canada in 2011.

== Later life and recognition ==
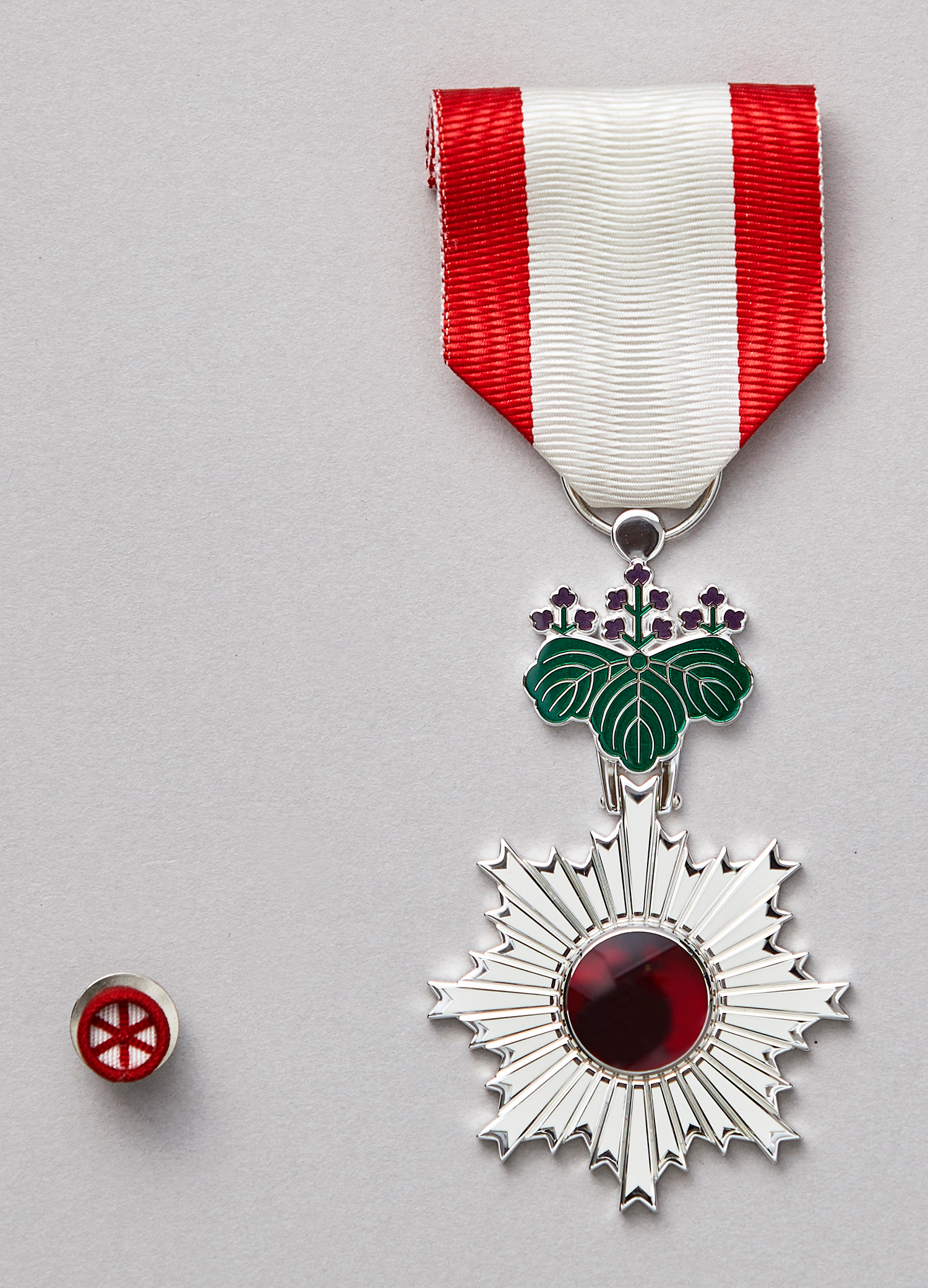
Order of the Rising Sun, Silver Rays, awarded to Sasaki in 1986

His objective of establishing a truly national judo association now accomplished, Sasaki stepped down from the Canadian Kodokan Black Belt Association's presidency in 1959 at the age of 56. He continued to teach at his Ashcroft dojo and visited other clubs around the country as a guest instructor.

Sasaki retired from his business career in 1968 and moved to Vancouver. With the help of Tomoaki Doi, he worked to help the city's struggling dojos, taking over the Marpole Judo Club in 1971, the Kitsilano Community Centre Judo Club in 1972, and the Killarney Community Centre Judo Club in 1978. He continued instructing at the Dunbar and Kerrisdale dojos into his 80s, and was promoted to shichidan (seventh dan) in 1975 and hachidan (eighth dan) in 1984.

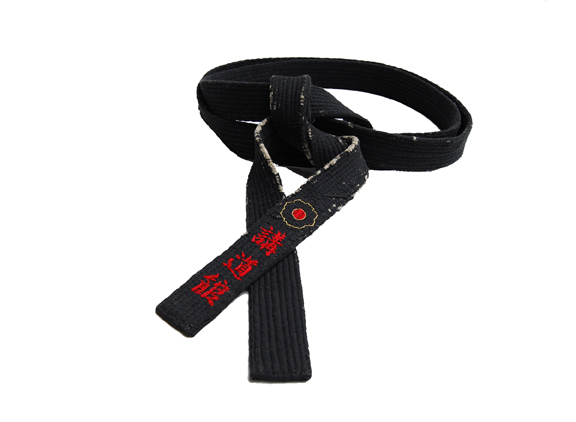
One of Sasaki's black belts bearing the Kodokan's logo and name in kanji

In 1986 Sasaki received two major honours: he was elected to the Canadian Amateur Sports Hall of Fame (now called the Canadian Olympic Hall of Fame), and decorated with the Order of the Rising Sun, Silver Rays by the Emperor of Japan in recognition of his service in improving the status of Japanese Canadians through his lifelong commitment to the promotion and development of judo in Canada.

Sasaki died in February 1993 at the age of 89. He taught judo for nearly 70 years of his life, and was posthumously inducted into the B.C. Sports Hall of Fame in 1995 and the Judo Canada Hall of Fame in 1996.

The Steve Sasaki Memorial Award is presented annually to a long-time member of Judo BC who exemplifies the principles of judo.

In 2011 the Nikkei National Museum & Cultural Centre in Burnaby, British Columbia established the Shigetaka (Steve) Sasaki Family fonds, a collection of documents, photos, film, and memorabilia from 1930 to 1991 donated by the Sasaki family.

== Publications ==
- Sasaki, S. (1986). "Outline of the Development of Judo in Canada". Judo B.C. Digest. 4 (2): 3–7.

== Interviews ==
- Sasaki, Shigetaka. "Interview with Shigetaka (Steve) Sasaki". Japanese Canadian Oral History Collection (in Japanese and English). Vancouver: National Nikkei Museum & Heritage Centre and Simon Fraser University.

== See also ==
- Judo in British Columbia
- Judo in Canada
- List of Canadian judoka
