= Donald Brenner =

Canadian judge

The Honourable Donald Brenner

Chief Justice of the Supreme Court of British Columbia
- In office 2000–2009
- Nominated by: Jean Chrétien
- Preceded by: Bryan Williams
- Succeeded by: Robert Bauman

Puisne Justice of the Supreme Court of British Columbia
- In office 1993–2000

Personal details
- Born: 1945
- Died: March 12, 2011 (aged 65–66)
- Education: University of British Columbia
- Profession: Lawyer

Donald I. Brenner (1945 – March 12, 2011) was a Canadian judge who served as the Chief Justice of the Supreme Court of British Columbia from 2000 until he stepped down from the position in 2009. In total Brenner spent more than 20 years as a member of the provincial Supreme Court. The Vancouver Sun called Brenner "the man who was most responsible for reforming the province's top trial bench."

Brenner was born in British Columbia to a World War II veteran and graduated from St. George's School in Vancouver in 1962. He obtained a commercial helicopter pilot's license when he was eighteen years old. He joined Canadian Pacific Airlines in 1966 as a pilot and finished his professional pilot career as a Boeing 737 captain.

Brenner obtained a bachelor's degree from the University of British Columbia and enrolled in law school in 1967. He received a law degree from the University of British Columbia Faculty of Law in 1970 and joined the bar in 1971.

In 1999, Brenner became chairman of the Supreme Court of British Columbia's litigation management committee. He also co-founded the B.C. Supreme Court's information technology committee. Under Brenner, who became Chief Justice in 2000, the British Columbia Supreme Court adopted a code of civil rules, the first major change in the court's procedures since the 19th Century. The B.C. Supreme Court is also one of the technological in Canada, as Brenner spearheaded to move to adopt video conferencing, electronic filing systems, and adopt new litigation management systems. Brenner stepped down as Chief Justice in 2009 and was succeeded by Chief Justice Robert Bauman.

Don Brenner died unexpectedly of natural causes on March 12, 2011, at the age of 64. He was survived by his wife, Robin, and two daughters.
