= Ronald Ian =

Ronald Ian may refer to:

- Ronald Ian Campbell (1890–1983), British diplomat
- Ronald Ian Cheffins (1930–2025), Canadian lawyer, judge, and political science professor
- Ronald Ian Currie (1928–1996), Scottish marine biologist
