= Government of British Columbia =

Canadian provincial government

- French: Gouvernement de la Colombie-Britannique
- Provincial government

Overview
- Established: July 20, 1871; 155 years ago
- Country: Canada
- Polity: Province
- Leader: Premier; Lorne Doerkson
- Appointed by: Lieutenant governor Wendy Lisogar-Cocchia
- Main organ: Executive Council
- Responsible to: Legislative Assembly
- Headquarters: Victoria
- Website: www2.gov.bc.ca

The Government of British Columbia (French: Gouvernement de la Colombie-Britannique) is the body responsible for the administration of the Canadian province of British Columbia. The term Government of British Columbia can refer to either the collective set of all three institutions, or more specifically to the executive—ministers of the Crown (the Executive Council) of the day, and the non-political staff within each provincial department or agency, i.e. the civil services, whom the ministers direct—which corporately brands itself as the Government of British Columbia, or more formally, His Majesty's Government (French: Gouvernement de Sa Majesté).

The current construct was established when the province joined Confederation in 1871. British Columbia is a secondary jurisdiction of Canada, a constitutional monarchy with a parliamentary democracy in the Westminster tradition; a premier—Lorne Doerkson of the Conservative Party since 2026—is the head of government and is invited by the Crown to form a government after securing the confidence of the Legislative Assembly, typically determined through the election of enough members of the Legislative Assembly (MLAs) of a single political party in an election to provide a majority of seats, forming a governing party or coalition. The sovereign is King Charles III, Canada's head of state, who is represented provincially in British Columbia by the lieutenant governor, Wendy Lisogar-Cocchia since 2025.

== Role of the Crown ==
Charles III is King in Right of British Columbia as of 2026

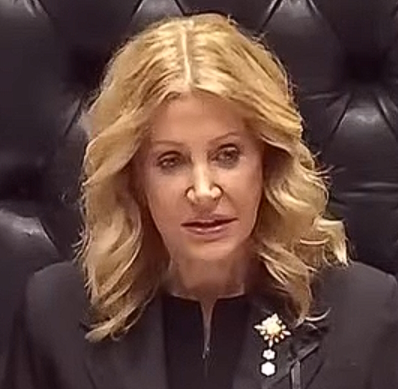
Wendy Lisogar-Cocchia is Lieutenant Governor as of 2026

King Charles III, as sovereign, is also the King in Right of British Columbia. As a Commonwealth realm, the Canadian monarch is shared with 14 other independent countries within the Commonwealth of Nations. Within Canada, the monarch exercises power individually on behalf of the federal government and the ten provinces.

The powers of the Crown are vested in the monarch and are exercised by the lieutenant governor. The advice of the premier and Executive Council is typically binding; the Constitution Act, 1867 requires executive power to be exercised only "by and with the advice of the Executive Council".

=== Lieutenant governor ===
The lieutenant governor is appointed by the governor general, on the advice of the prime minister of Canada. Thus, it is typically the lieutenant governor whom the premier and ministers advise, exercising much of the royal prerogative and granting royal assent.

The executive power is vested in the Crown and exercised in-Council, meaning on the advice of the Executive Council; conventionally, this is the Cabinet, which is chaired by the premier and comprises ministers of the Crown.

== Premier and Executive Council ==
Lorne Doerkson has been Premier of British Columbia since 2026

The term Government of British Columbia, or more formally His Majesty's Government, refers to the activities of the King-in-Council. The day-to-day operation and activities of the Government of British Columbia are performed by the provincial departments and agencies, staffed by the non-partisan public service and directed by the elected government.

=== Premier ===
The premier of British Columbia is the primary minister of the Crown. The premier acts as the head of government for the province, chairs and selects the membership of the Cabinet, and advises the Crown on the exercise of executive power and much of the royal prerogative. As premiers hold office by virtue of their ability to command the confidence of the elected Legislative Assembly, they typically sit as a MLA and lead the largest party or a coalition in the Assembly. Once sworn in, the premier holds office until either they resign or they are removed by the lieutenant governor after either a motion of no confidence or defeat in a general election.

Lorne Doerkson has been premier since November 20, 2026, after winning the 2026 provincial election. He succeeded David Eby, whose snap election call ended the New Democratic Party's majority government of the 43rd Parliament.

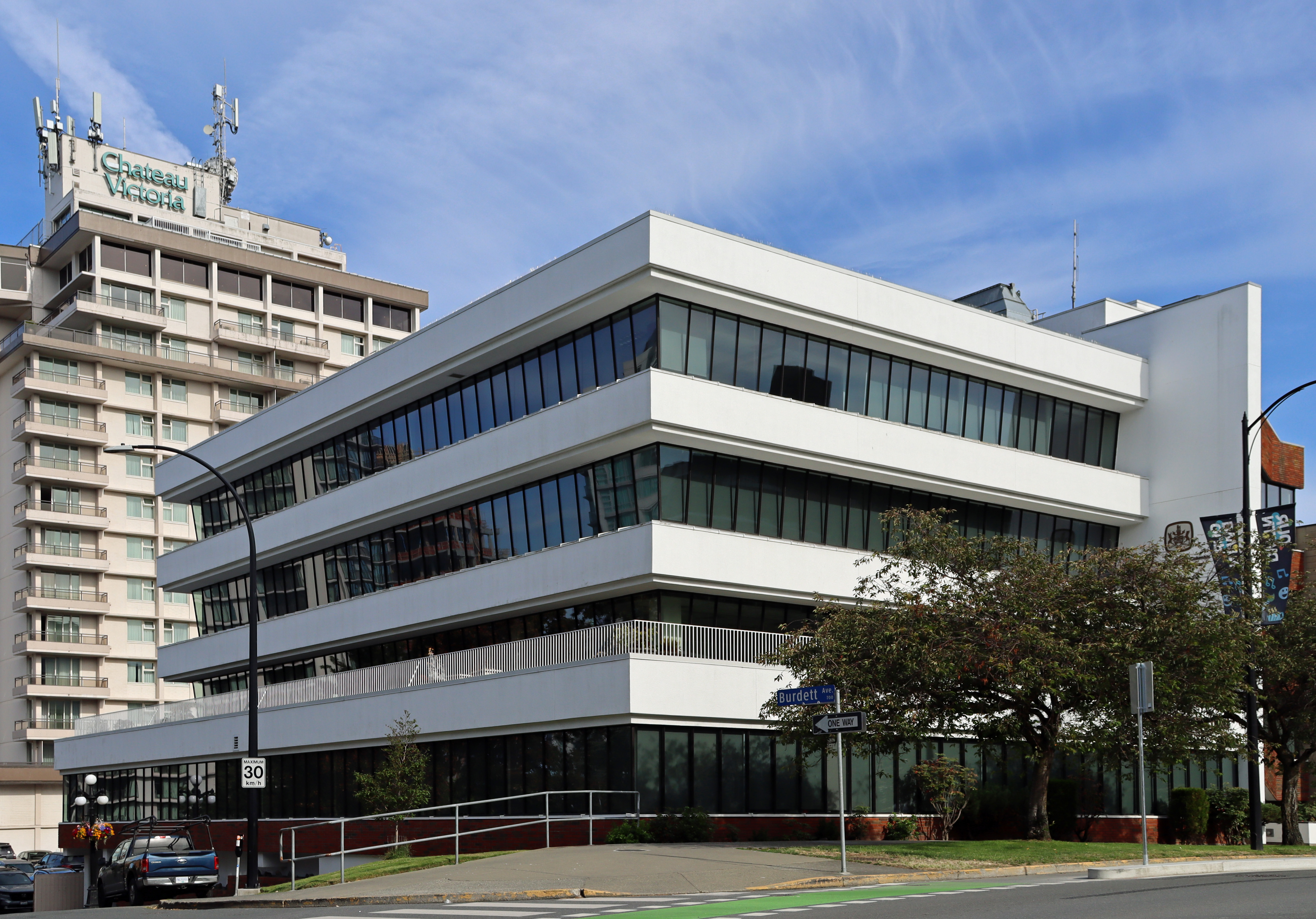
The headquarters of the BC Public Service Agency in Victoria, the human resources department of the provincial government

== See also ==
- Politics of British Columbia
- Politics of Canada and Government of Canada
