= Supreme Court of Yukon =

- Cour suprême du Yukon
- The Royal Arms as used by the Supreme Court
- Jurisdiction: Yukon
- Location: Whitehorse
- Composition method: appointed on advice of the federal government
- Appeals to: Court of Appeal of Yukon
- Number of positions: 3 (plus 5 justices from the Northwest Territories and Nunavut, and 42 deputy judges from other provinces)
- Website: yukoncourts.ca/en/supreme-court

Chief Justice
- Currently: Suzanne M. Duncan
- Since: 2020

The Supreme Court of Yukon (SCY; French: Cour suprême du Yukon) is the superior court having general jurisdiction for the Canadian territory of Yukon. Civil and criminal cases are heard by the court, as well as appeals from the Yukon Territorial Court, the Yukon Small Claims Court and other quasi-judicial boards. The court is based in Whitehorse. Appeals from the court are made to the Court of Appeal of Yukon.

The current Chief Justice of the Supreme Court of Yukon is Suzanne Duncan.

== Justices ==
The SCY consists of three resident judges, five judges from the Northwest Territories and Nunavut, and forty-two deputy judges appointed from across Canada. The rules of procedure for the SCY are based upon those of the Supreme Court of British Columbia.

Justices of the SCY are also ex officio members of the Court of Appeal of Yukon, Court of Appeal for the Northwest Territories, and Nunavut Court of Appeal.

Name	Appointed	Nominated by	Prior position(s)
Chief Justice Suzanne Duncan	November 30, 2018 October 1, 2020 (CJ)	J. Trudeau	Counsel, Kwanlin Dün First Nation
Justice Edith Campbell	March 15, 2018	J. Trudeau	Public Prosecution Service of Canada; PPSC's Competition Law Section
Justice Karen Wenckebach	November 19, 2020	J. Trudeau	Legal Counsel, Government of Yukon

== Notable decisions ==
- Dunbar & Edge v. Yukon (Government of) & Canada (A.G.)
