= YKSC =

YKSC may refer to:

- Kingscote Airport, Kangaroo Island, South Australia
- Supreme Court of Yukon, based in Whitehorse, Yukon
