= Gordon Hunter (judge) =

Chief Justice of British Columbia
- In office March 4, 1902 – March 15, 1929

Justice of the Supreme Court of British Columbia
- In office March 4, 1902 – March 15, 1929

Personal details
- Born: May 4, 1863 Bansville, Ontario
- Died: March 15, 1929 (aged 65) Victoria, British Columbia
- Education: University of Toronto
- Occupation: lawyer, judge

Gordon Hunter (May 4, 1863 – March 15, 1929) was a Canadian lawyer, judge and served as Chief Justice of British Columbia from 1902 to 1927.

== Career ==
Hunter attended the University of Toronto, where he became close friends with future Chief Justice of Canada Lyman Duff and future British Columbia criminal lawyer Stuart Alexander Henderson. He graduated in 1885, and was awarded the Lorne silver medal. He then attended Osgoode Hall and was called to the Bar of Ontario.

In 1891, Hunter moved to Victoria and took over the British Columbia Reports. In 1894, he invited Lyman Duff to partner with him in Victoria and formed the partnership Hunter & Duff, which lasted for two years until they amicably separated.

On March 4, 1902, Hunter was appointed Chief Justice of the Supreme Court of British Columbia. In 1909, the British Columbia Court of Appeal was created as a separate appeal body, and James Alexander MacDonald was appointed the Chief Justice of the Court of Appeal.

On March 15, 1929, Hunter died at St. Joseph's Hospital in Victoria.

== Works cited ==
- Verchere, David R. (1988). A progression of judges : a history of the Supreme Court of British Columbia. University of British Columbia Press. ISBN 978-0-7748-0293-2.
- Williams, David Ricardo (1984). Duff, a life in the law. University of British Columbia Press. ISBN 0-7748-0203-0.
