= Sarah Morgan-Silvester =

Chancellor of the University of British Columbia

Sarah Morgan-Silvester (born 1959) was the Chancellor of the University of British Columbia from November 19, 2008, through the end of her second three-year term on June 30, 2014. She was replaced by Lindsay Gordon on July 1, 2014.

== Biography ==
She was born in Victoria, British Columbia and received a B.Com. in Finance with Honours from the University of British Columbia in 1982. She has worked for HSBC Bank Canada and the C. D. Howe Institute.

She is the chairperson of the Vancouver Fraser Port Authority and the B.C. Women's Hospital & Health Centre. She also sits on the Boards of ENMAX, Women in the Lead Inc., and the David Suzuki Foundation.

Academic offices
Preceded by Allan McEachern	Chancellor of the University of British Columbia; 2008 - 2014	Succeeded by Lindsay Gordon
