= Peter A. Allard School of Law =

Law school of the University of British Columbia

Coordinates: 49.2698°N 123.2536°W

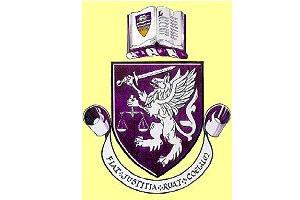
- Motto: Latin: Fiat justitia ruat cœlum
- Motto in English: Let justice be done though the heavens fall
- Type: Public Law School
- Established: 1945; 81 years ago
- Dean: Bruce MacDougall (pro tem)
- Students: 600 (2013)
- Location: Vancouver, British Columbia, Canada
- Website: allard.ubc.ca

The Peter A. Allard School of Law (abbreviated as Allard Law) is the law school of the University of British Columbia. The faculty offers the Juris Doctor degree. The faculty features courses on business law, tax law, environmental and natural resource law, indigenous law, Pacific Rim issues, and feminist legal theory.

It was renamed from the University of British Columbia Faculty of Law in 2015 to honour a $30,000,000 gift from Peter Allard, an alumnus, which followed a 2011 gift from him of about $12,000,000.

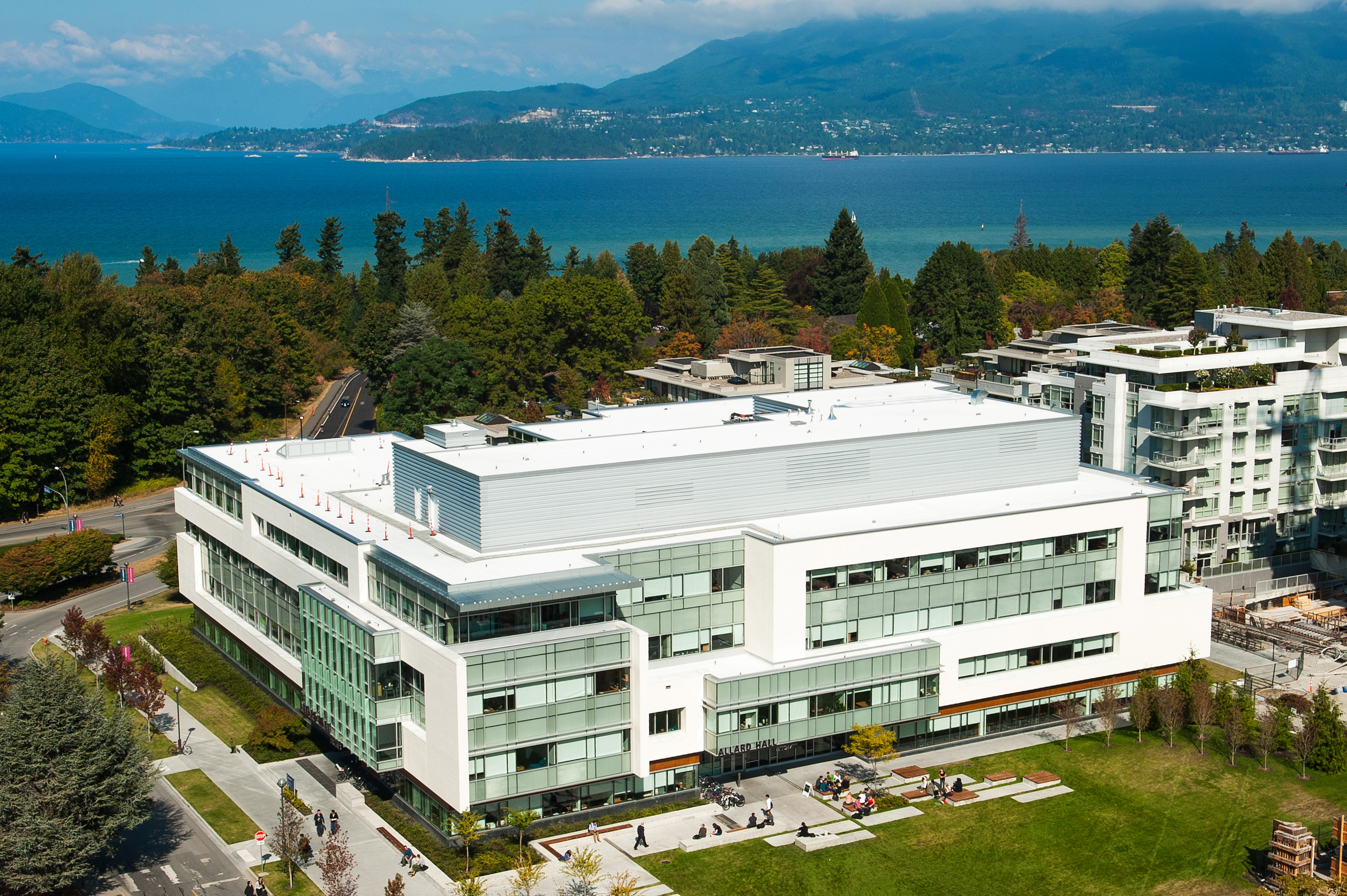
Aerial view of Allard Hall, home of Peter A. Allard School of Law, Vancouver, British Columbia (Canada)

== History ==
UBC offered lectures in law from 1920, but the university's faculty of law was established in 1945, and was served by George F. Curtis (1906–2005) as the founding dean, until he retired in 1971. Because it lacked adequate infrastructure, the law school used army huts from World War II, until a permanent structure was built in 1951, which was named after Curtis; it was replaced by Allard Hall in 2009.

In recognition of a donation from UBC law alumnus Peter A. Allard, the law school was renamed the Peter A. Allard School of Law, on 22 January 2015; previously, it had been named University of British Columbia Faculty of Law. Allard is the son of one-time Edmonton Oilers co-owner, Dr. Charles "Chuck" Allard, who also brought the SCTV sketch comedy television series to Edmonton.

== Academics ==
In 2023, both QS World and Times Higher Education ranked Allard the second-best common law school in the Canada, ranking behind the University of Toronto. Academically, the school is amongst the most selective in the nation, with a median LSAT score of 166, or the 91st percentile, for the entering class of 2022.

In 2024, the Times Higher Education ranked Allard the third-best law school within Canada, and the 37th in the world.

At least five of Allard's current faculty are former Rhodes scholars, with many more serving as former law clerks at the Supreme Court of Canada.

== Allard Hall ==
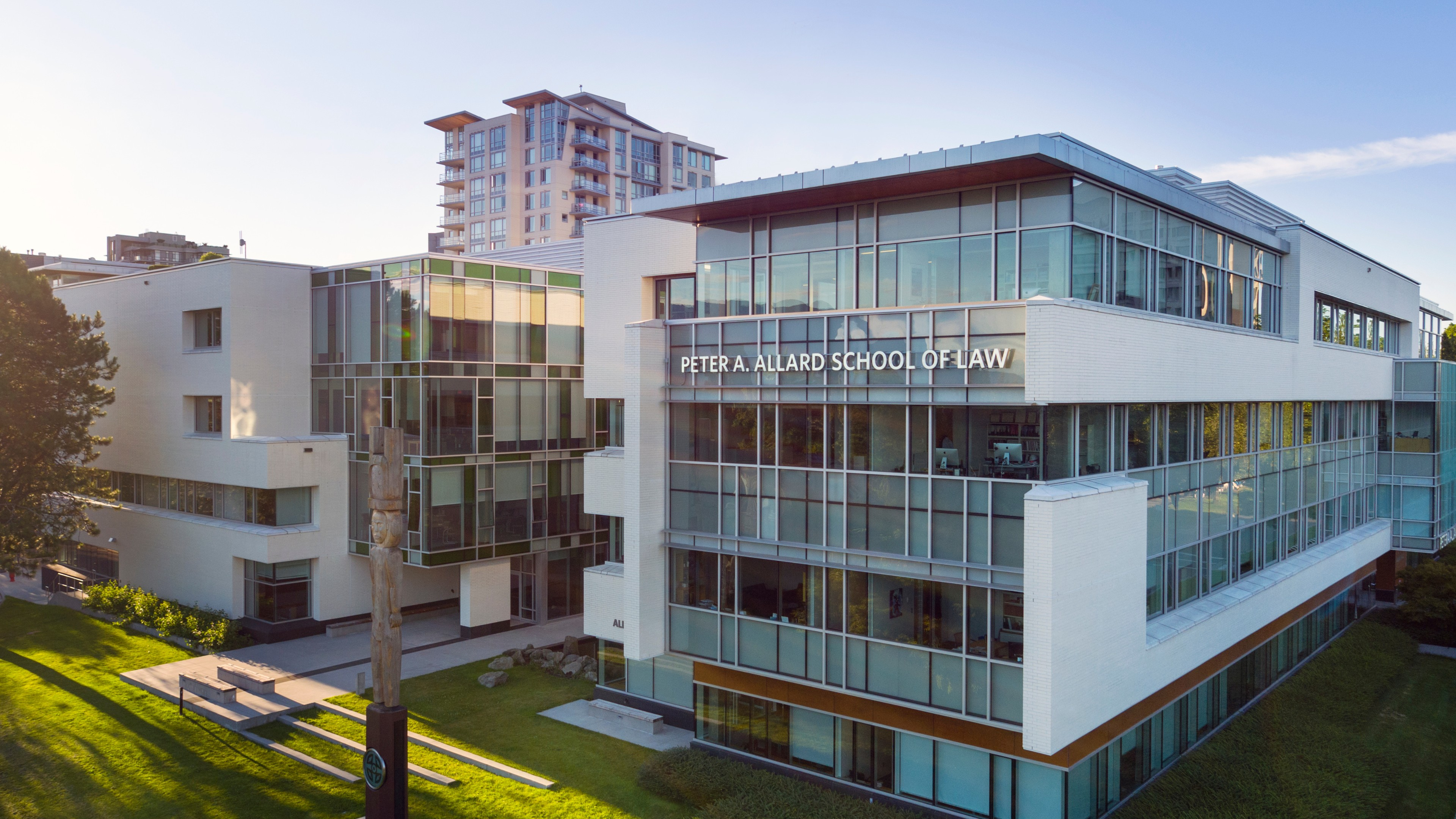
UBC Allard Law Building

The school is located at the University of British Columbia's campus in Vancouver, British Columbia. In 2011 it moved out of its former building, a Fred Hollingsworth designed brutalist-style building with malfunctioning heating and cooling and into a new building that had recently been completed. The building cost around $56,000,000; the university used $21,000,000 of its own funds and the rest came from donations, including $12,000,000 from The Law Foundation of B.C. In 2011 shortly before students and faculty began moving in, Peter Allard, an alumnus, donated about $12,000,000 to the school, with about $10,000,000 of it going to complete the capital campaign; the building was named after him.

== Allard Prize for International Integrity ==
The Allard Prize was established in 2012 and was initially funded by part of the 2011 gift from Allard and further funded by a subsequent $30,000,000 donation by Allard in 2015. The Allard Prize became independent of the Allard School of Law at the University of British Columbia on 21 June 2019.

The first prize was awarded in 2013, and it is given biennially to an individual, movement or organization that has "demonstrated exceptional courage and leadership in combating corruption, especially through promoting transparency, accountability and the Rule of Law". It is one of the world's largest prizes dedicated to the fight against corruption and protecting human rights.

The winner receives $100,000 and an Allard Prize award which is an original work of art; Honourable Mention recipients receive an Allard Prize award and may be awarded a cash amount at the discretion of the Allard Prize Committee.

Many Allard Prize nominees and recipients have been, and continue to be, subjected to threats, violence, imprisonment and other attacks associated with their anti-corruption and human rights activities. One Honourable Mention recipient (Sergei Magnitsky) was nominated posthumously after being tortured and dying in a Russian prison.

== Publications ==
=== UBC Law Review ===
The University of British Columbia Law Review is the school's official law review and is published by the UBC Law Review Society. Similar to the Harvard Law Review, the editorial process and business of the Society is run by Juris Doctor students, while manuscripts submitted to the journal are peer-reviewed by professors with specialized knowledge of the subject matter. It was first published in 1949 as a collection of legal essays entitled the UBC Legal Notes. In 1959, it officially became the UBC Law Review. It was incorporated as a non-profit society in 1966. The UBC Law Review is a top ranking scholarly publication in Canada and globally, alongside the University of Toronto Law Journal and McGill Law Journal.

=== Table of Statutory Limitations ===
First published in 1955 as a section of the UBC Law Review, the Table of Statutory Limitations has since matured into an annual compendium of legal limitation periods of various statutes. The TSL is published by students at the school.

=== Annual Review of Insolvency Law ===
The only Canadian peer-reviewed journal dedicated to insolvency and bankruptcy law. This annual publication offers articles by scholars and practitioners on personal and commercial insolvency law.

=== Canadian Journal of Family Law ===
First published in 1978, the Canadian Journal of Family Law is Canada's first family law journal. The journal is a biannual interdisciplinary journal that publishes both English and French academic articles on a broad range of issues related to family law. The journal is peer reviewed by an advisory board consisting of legal professionals and academics. It is produced by an editorial staff of students at the school.

=== Masks: The Online Journal of Law and Theatre ===
An interdisciplinary peer-reviewed journal based at the school. The journal focuses on the intersections of Law and theatre.

=== UBC International Law Journal ===
The UBC International Law Journal is an online open access academic journal published by students at the school. The journal was initially created through the UBC International Law Society. The journal publishes exclusively student work, reviewed by students. The first issue was published in November 2008.

=== Legal Eye newspaper ===
The Legal Eye is a newspaper published monthly by students at the school. Started in September 2003, the Legal Eye serves as a forum for reporting on news about the Faculty, broader legal community, case commentary, the occasional recipe, book/restaurant/film reviews, event reviews, and for recognizing student activities and achievements.

== Notable faculty ==
- Beverley McLachlin PC, 1974–1981, became Chief Justice of Canada in 2000.
- Joel Bakan, author of The Corporation.

== Notable alumni ==
- Donald Brenner, former chief justice of the Supreme Court of British Columbia
- Kim Brooks, dean of both law and management at Dalhousie University
- Kim Campbell, first woman prime minister of Canada
- Joe Clark PC CC AOE, former prime minister of Canada withdrew after first-year at Allard School of Law.
- Ujjal Dosanjh PC QC, 33rd premier of British Columbia
- Ed Fast, former minister of international trade, Member of Parliament for Abbotsford since 2006
- Lance Finch, former Chief Justice of British Columbia.
- Thomas Martin Franck, international law scholar and NYU law professor emeritus, former editor-In-chief of the American Journal of International Law.
- Frank Iacobucci CC, former Supreme Court of Canada justice and former dean of the University of Toronto Faculty of Law.
- Ted Lee, former diplomat and historian, former governor of Canada to the International Atomic Energy Agency.
- Mark Okerstrom, 2004 – president/CEO of Expedia Group
- Bud Smith QC, former attorney general of BC
- Ari Taub (born 1971), Olympic Greco-Roman wrestler
- Jody Wilson-Raybould, former attorney general of Canada Minister of Justice, Member of Parliament for Vancouver Granville
