= Allan McEachern =

Canadian judge (1926–2008)

Allan McEachern (May 20, 1926 – January 10, 2008) was a Canadian lawyer, a judge, and a Chancellor of the University of British Columbia.

== Personal ==
McEachern's first wife, Gloria, died in 1997 after 44 years of marriage. Two years later, he married Appeal Court Justice Mary Newbury.

== Education ==
McEachern graduated from the University of British Columbia with a Bachelor of Arts in 1949, followed by a law degree in 1950.

== Career ==
McEachern became UBC's 16th chancellor in 2002. He graduated from UBC with a Bachelor of Arts in 1949, a law degree in 1950 and was given an honorary doctor of Laws degree in 1990.

McEachern practiced law with the leading Vancouver law firm of Russell and DuMoulin for 28 years after being called to the bar in 1951. He became Chief Justice of the Supreme Court of British Columbia in 1979. In 1988. he was appointed Chief Justice of the British Columbia Court of Appeal. McEachern retired from that position in May 2001. Later that year he returned to the practice of law at his former firm, now called Fasken Martineau DuMoulin.

His career as Chief Justice in both courts was distinguished by his reform of court procedure and for bringing the Canadian legal system closer to the public by being the first judge in Canada to host his own web site, which invited the public to e-mail their questions about the legal system. In addition, he chaired the Legal Aid Society from 1975 to 1976 and served from 1996 to 2001 as vice-chair of the Canadian Judicial Council, the body responsible for dealing with issues relating to the performance of federally appointed judges in Canada.

McEachern also served as a Director of the Vancouver Bar Association, President of the Legal Aid Society, Bencher of the Law Society and a member of the Council of the Canadian Bar Association, President of the B.C. Lions (1967–69), President of the Canadian Football League, the third commissioner of the Canadian Football League and Ethics Commissioner for VANOC.

McEachern's career was not without controversy. B. Douglas Cox described McEachern's judgement in the 1991 Gitskan-West'suwet'en land claim case Delgamuukw et al. v. The Queen as "a stunning disappointment." In the judgement, McEachern found that Aboriginal title in BC had been extinguished, and commented that "it would not be accurate to assume that even pre-contact existence in the territory was in the least bit idyllic. The plaintiffs' ancestors had no written language, no horses or wheeled vehicles, slavery and starvation was not uncommon, wars with neighbouring peoples were common, and there is no doubt, to quote Hobbes, that aboriginal life in the territory was, at best, 'nasty, brutish and short.'" This characterization is still subject to significant criticism. McEachern's decision that Aboriginal title had been extinguished was overturned on appeal after BC's newly-elected NDP government appointed Bryan Williams as counsel. According to Williams, he advised the five-member BC Court of Appeal panel 'that the Crown did not wish to argue that the Chief Justice had been correct. Rather, it wished to argue that extinguishment [of Aboriginal title] had not taken place'. Accordingly, in 1993 the BC Court of Appeal decided that aboriginal title had not been extinguished by Confederation. The BC Court of Appeal decision was then appealed to the Supreme Court of Canada, which in 1997 confirmed in Delgamuukw v. British Columbia that Aboriginal title does exist in British Columbia and that it is a right to the land itself, not just the right to hunt, fish or gather'.

== Recognition ==
He was granted an honorary Doctor of Laws degree by the University of British Columbia in 1990. He was a Life Bencher of the Law Society of British Columbia.

== Achievements ==
In addition to his many judicial decisions, during his tenure as Chief Justice of both courts, McEachern is credited with streamlining the procedures of the courts, introducing online access to decisions of the court and establishing a website that allowed internet visitors to ask questions directly of the court. He wrote and published a Compendium of Law and Judges.

Academic offices
Preceded by William Sauder	Chancellor of the University of British Columbia; 2002 – January 10, 2008	Succeeded by Sarah Morgan-Silvester
