= Ronald Ian Cheffins =

Canadian lawyer (1930–2025)

The Honourable Ronald Cheffins
- Born: Ronald Ian Cheffins; January 13, 1930; Montreal, Quebec, Canada
- Died: November 2, 2025 (aged 95)
- Occupations: Lawyer, judge, law/political science professor
- Known for: Being a Canadian Constitutional expert and the first lawyer appointed directly to the British Columbia court of appeal (1985)

Ronald Ian Cheffins (January 13, 1930 – November 2, 2025) was a Canadian lawyer and politician scientist. He was professor of political science and law and the University of Victoria. He was the first lawyer to be appointed directly to the British Columbia court of appeal in 1985. He held the seat until resigning 2 years later in 1987 to return to legal and scholarly practice after finding judicial work too "uncongenial". In 1991, he served as the Vice-chair on the Law Reform Commission of British Columbia. He was an expert on the Canadian Constitution and advised five past lieutenants-governor. He was a weekly Friday guest on CFAX 1070's Adam Stirling radio programme, where he discussed both local and world politics.

== Life and career ==
Cheffins was born in Montreal, Quebec on January 30, 1930.

In 1953, Cheffins was appointed a Special Commissioner for taking Affidavits within the province of British Columbia by Lieutenant-Governor Clarence Wallace. In 1955, Cheffins graduated from the University of British Columbia with a Bachelor of Laws, before continuing his studies at the university.

Cheffins died on November 2, 2025, at the age of 95.

== Publications ==
Cheffins authored The Royal Prerogative and the Office of the Lieutenant Governor in 2000, a paper which has been used as a reference in multiple additional papers and books.
