= Edith Campbell (judge) =

Canadian judge

Edith Campbell is a Canadian judge serving on the Yukon Territory Supreme Court. She was appointed on March 15, 2018 and was sworn in on June 21, 2018.
