= Herbert William Davey =

Herbert William Davey (5 March 1899 – 15 October 1973) was a Canadian lawyer and judge. He was Chief Justice of British Columbia from 1967 to 1972.
