= Carol Huddart =

Canadian jurist

The Honourable Madam Justice Carol Huddart

Judge of the Supreme Court of British Columbia
- In office 1987–1996

Justice of the British Columbia Court of Appeal
- In office 1996–2011

Carol Mahood Huddart is a Canadian legal scholar and former justice of the Supreme Court of British Columbia and British Columbia Court of Appeal. She initially practised in Ontario, later moving to Victoria, British Columbia, where she maintained a family law practice. She was first appointed to the bench in 1981, when she began serving on the County Court Bench in Vancouver. In 1987, she took up a position on the Supreme Court of British Columbia; in 1996, she was named to the Court of Appeal. Huddart took supernumerary status in 2003 and retired from the bench as of January 1, 2012.

Huddart has published several works on family law, including a book chapter on division of property and a guide to the practice of family law in British Columbia.

== Publications ==
- Huddart, Carol (1981). "Property Division on Marriage Breakdown in the Common Law Provinces". In Doerr, Audrey; Carrier, Micheline (eds.). Women and the Constitution in Canada. Canadian Advisory Council on the Status of Women. pp. 94–112. ISBN 0-660-10872-0. OCLC 8002076.
- Huddart, Carol; Brown, Trudi L. (2014). British Columbia Family Law Practice: 2015. LexisNexis Canada. ISBN 978-0-433-47764-8. OCLC 887844806.
