= Alexander Campbell DesBrisay (judge) =

- Born: 27 June 1888; Winnipeg, Manitoba
- Died: 30 November 1963 (aged 75); Vancouver, British Columbia
- Education: Queen's University (BA 1910)
- Spouse: Ella Helen Wasmansdorff (m. 1916)

Alexander Campbell DesBrisay (27 June 1888 – 30 November 1963) was a Canadian lawyer and judge. He was Chief Justice of British Columbia from 1958 to 1963.
