= Philippine Chinese Baptist Convention =

Convention of Chinese-Filipino Southern Baptist Churches (CCF-SBC)
- Classification: Protestant
- Orientation: Baptist
- Theology: Evangelical Baptist
- Polity: Congregationalist
- Region: Philippines
- Origin: January 21, 1957; Baguio, Philippines
- Branched from: Southern Baptist Convention

The Convention of Chinese-Filipino Southern Baptist Churches was formally established on January 21, 1957, though they were technically in existence since 1950. It began in November 30, 1948, as Philippine Chinese Baptist Convention, when Southern Baptist missionaries in Shanghai, China were forced to relocate to the Philippines due to the civil unrest caused by the Chinese Civil War. The missionaries settled in Baguio where they started their work in converting the local Chinese there before eventually establishing churches in Dagupan, Manila and Davao City in 1952. The PCBC also established the Philippine Baptist Theological Seminary in Baguio on July 15, 1952. Eventually, PCBC was renamed to Convention of Chinese-Filipino Southern Baptist Churches (CCF-SBC).

== Member Churches ==
As of April 2013, the CCF-SBC has the following member churches:

1. Baguio Chinese Baptist Church
2. Manila Chinese Baptist Church
3. Davao Chinese Baptist Church
4. La Union Chinese Baptist Church
5. Dagupan Chinese Baptist Church
6. La Trinidad Benguet International Baptist Church
7. Caloocan Christian Baptist Church
8. Tarlac Living Faith Christian Baptist Church

== Summer Camps ==
The CCF-SBC has annual camps held during the Holy Week from Monday-Saturday for the Youth and the Children's Camp. The Adult Camp holds its camp on Thursday to Saturday of the Holy Week. The Youth and Children's Camp are usually held at the Philippine Baptist Theological Seminary in Baguio.
