= Court of Appeal of Yukon =

- Cour d'appel du Yukon
- The Royal Arms as used by the Court of Appeal
- Jurisdiction: Yukon
- Location: Whitehorse and Vancouver
- Website: www.yukoncourts.ca/en/court-appeal

The Court of Appeal of Yukon (French: Cour d'appel du Yukon) is the highest appellate court for Yukon. It hears appeals of both criminal and civil cases from the Supreme Court of Yukon and Yukon Territorial Court. The Court of Appeal sits in both Whitehorse and Vancouver. Cases are mostly heard by a panel of three judges.

The court consists of justices from the British Columbia Court of Appeal and justices from Yukon, Northwest Territories and Nunavut. The Chief Justice of British Columbia serves as the Chief Justice of the Court of Appeal for Yukon.
