= Wendy Lisogar-Cocchia =

Lieutenant Governor of British Columbia since 2025

Her Honour the Honourable Wendy Lisogar-Cocchia CM OBC
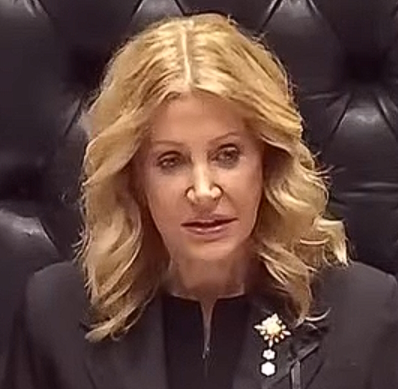
- Lisogar-Cocchia in 2026

31st Lieutenant Governor of British Columbia
- Incumbent
- Assumed office January 30, 2025
- Monarch: Charles III
- Governors General: Mary Simon; Louise Arbour
- Premier: David Eby; Lorne Doerkson
- Preceded by: Janet Austin

Personal details
- Education: University of British Columbia (B.A.)

Wendy Lisogar-Cocchia CM OBC is a Canadian entrepreneur and autism advocate who has served as the 31st lieutenant governor of British Columbia since 2025. She is the viceregal representative of King Charles III in the province of British Columbia.

Lisogar-Cocchia is the founder of Canada's largest independent spa chain, the Absolute Spa Group. In addition, she established the Pacific Autism Family Network. Lisogar-Cocchia is a member of the Order of Canada and the Order of British Columbia.

She was the CEO of the Century Plaza Hotel in Vancouver.

Order of precedence
Preceded by Charles III, King of Canada	Order of precedence in British Columbia as of January 2025	Succeeded by David Eby, Premier of British Columbia
Preceded by Anita Neville as Lieutenant Governor of Manitoba	Canadian order of precedence as Lieutenant Governor of British Columbia	Succeeded by Wassim Salamoun as Lieutenant Governor of Prince Edward Island
