= Henry Bird (judge) =

Henry Irvine Bird (1892– 8 November 1971) was a Canadian lawyer and judge. He was Chief Justice of British Columbia from 1964 to 1967.
