= Territorial Court of Yukon =

- Cour territoriale du Yukon
- The territorial arms as used by the Territorial Court
- Jurisdiction: Yukon
- Location: Whitehorse
- Website: www.yukoncourts.ca/en/territorial-court

The Territorial Court of Yukon (French: Cour territoriale du Yukon) is the lower trial court in the court system of the Canadian territory of Yukon. The court sits permanently in Whitehorse but also provides services in 14 other communities including Dawson City and Watson Lake.

== Responsibilities ==
According to the official website of the government of Yukon, the court deals with most criminal prosecutions in the territory under the Criminal Code and other federal statutes, as well as young offenders and offences under the laws of Yukon. It also handles bail hearings, first appearances, trials and sentencing, and has jurisdiction over both summary and indictable offences.

The Territorial Court does not deal with most matters of family law, such as divorce, child custody and adoption. Its jurisdiction in civil cases is limited to $25,000.

== Composition ==
The court has three full-time judges and twelve deputy judges, predominantly retired judges from other jurisdictions. The Justice of the Peace Court, which is also part of the Territorial Court, consists of one full-time judge and 32 part-time Justices of the Peace, who are not legally qualified.

=== List of current judges ===
Presiding Judges

- Judge Karen Ruddy
- Judge Michael Cozens
- Chief Judge Peter Chisholm

Deputy Judges

- Justice Michael S. Block, Ontario
- Judge Michel Chartier, Manitoba
- Judge Thomas Crabtree, British Columbia
- Justice Joseph De Filippis, Ontario
- Judge William Digby, Nova Scotia
- Judge John Faulkner, Yukon
- Judge Christine V. Harapiak, Manitoba
- Judge Murray J. Hinds, Saskatchewan
- Judge Martin Lambert, Ontario
- Judge Heino Lilles, Yukon
- Judge Donald S. Luther, Newfoundland
- Judge E. Ann Marie MacInnes, Nova Scotia
- Judge Gerald Morin, Saskatchewan
- Judge Brian M. Neal, British Columbia
- Judge Nancy K. Orr, Prince Edward Island
- Judge James Plemel, Saskatchewan
- Judge E. Dennis Schmidt, British Columbia
- Judge Richard D. Schneider, Ontario
- Judge Herman J. Seidemann III, British Columbia
- Judge Carol Ann Snell, Saskatchewan
- Judge Murray P. Thompson, Manitoba
- Judge David C. Walker, New Brunswick
- Judge Timothy W. White, Saskatchewan
- Judge Pamela Williams, Nova Scotia
- Judge Raymond E. Wyant, Manitoba
