= Lieutenant Governor of British Columbia =

Viceregal representative of the Canadian monarch

- Emblem of the lieutenant governor

- Flag of the lieutenant governor

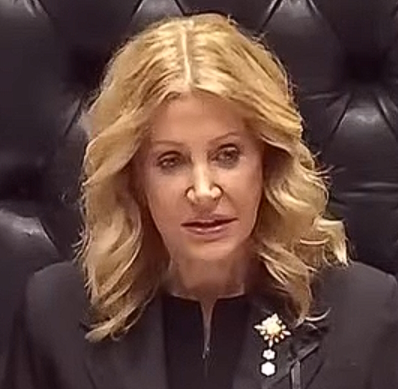
- Incumbent; Wendy Lisogar-Cocchia since 30 January 2025
- Viceroy
- Style: Her Honour the Honourable
- Residence: Government House, Victoria
- Appointer: The governor general on the advice of the prime minister
- Term length: At the governor general's pleasure (usually 5 years)
- Formation: 20 July 1871
- First holder: Joseph Trutch
- Salary: $126,241/year
- Website: ltgov.bc.ca

The lieutenant governor of British Columbia (/lɛfˈtɛnənt/) is the representative of the monarch in the province of British Columbia, Canada. The office of lieutenant governor is an office of the Crown and serves as a representative of the monarchy in the province, rather than the governor general of Canada. The office was created in 1871 when the Colony of British Columbia joined Confederation. Since then, the lieutenant governor has been the representative of the monarchy in British Columbia.

Previously, between December 1858 and July 1863, the title of lieutenant governor of British Columbia was given to Richard Clement Moody, who was Chief Commissioner of Lands and Works for British Columbia and Commander of the Royal Engineers, Columbia Detachment that founded the Colony of British Columbia in 1858. Moody's office coexisted with the office of governor of British Columbia that was held by James Douglas during that time.

The lieutenant governor of British Columbia is appointed in the same manner as the other provincial viceroys in Canada and is similarly tasked with carrying out most of the monarch's constitutional and ceremonial duties. Since 30 January 2025, Wendy Lisogar-Cocchia has served as the 31st lieutenant governor of British Columbia.

== Role and presence ==
The lieutenant governor of British Columbia is vested with a number of governmental duties. As viceroy, they are also expected to undertake various ceremonial roles. A member themselves and Chancellor of the Order of British Columbia, they will induct deserving individuals into the order and, upon installation, automatically become a Knight or Dame of Justice and the Vice-Prior in British Columbia of the Most Venerable Order of the Hospital of Saint John of Jerusalem. The viceroy further presents other provincial honours and decorations, as well as various awards that are named for and presented by the lieutenant governor; these are generally created in partnership with another government or charitable organization and linked specifically to their cause. These honours are presented at official ceremonies, which count amongst hundreds of other engagements the lieutenant governor partakes in each year, either as host or guest of honour; the lieutenant governor of British Columbia undertook 350 engagements in 2006 and 390 in 2007.

At these events, the lieutenant governor's presence is marked by the lieutenant governor's standard, consisting of a blue field bearing the escutcheon of the Arms of His Majesty in Right of British Columbia, surmounted by a crown and surrounded by ten gold maple leaves, symbolizing the ten provinces of Canada. Within British Columbia, they also follow only the sovereign in the province's order of precedence, preceding even other members of the Canadian Royal Family and the Canadian monarch's federal representative, the governor general of Canada.

== History ==
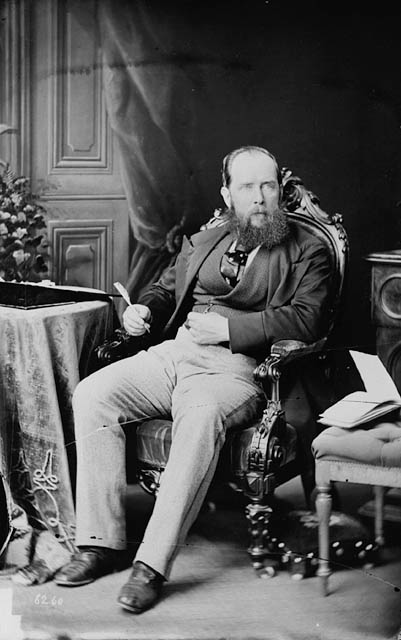
First lieutenant governor of the Province of British Columbia, Sir Joseph William Trutch KCMG, 1871–1876

The first British settlement in the area was the Colony of British Columbia, of which the founder and first lieutenant governor was Richard Clement Moody, who had previously served as the first governor of the Falkland Islands. Moody also had the title Chief Commissioner of Lands and Works for British Columbia. Moody selected the site for and founded New Westminster—the original capital of British Columbia—and established Cariboo Road and Stanley Park. He named Burnaby Lake after his private secretary, Robert Burnaby, and named Port Coquitlam's 400-foot (120 m) Mary Hill after his wife, Mary. Port Moody is named after him.

The original Colony of British Columbia was amalgamated with the Colony of Vancouver Island in 1866. That larger jurisdiction was succeeded by the present-day province of British Columbia, following the territory's entry into Canadian Confederation in 1871, when the present office of the lieutenant governor of British Columbia came into being.

Since 1871, 28 lieutenant governors have served the province, including firsts such as David Lam—the first Asian-Canadian lieutenant governor in Canada—and Iona Campagnolo—the first female lieutenant governor of British Columbia. The shortest mandate by a lieutenant governor of British Columbia was Edward Gawler Prior, from 1919 to his death in 1920, while the longest was George Pearkes, from October 1960 to July 1968.

Standard of the lieutenant governor of British Columbia from 1906 to 1982

Standard of the lieutenant governor of British Columbia from 1871 to 1906

In 1903, before political parties were a part of British Columbia politics, Henri-Gustave Joly de Lotbinière was the last lieutenant governor in Canada to dismiss an incumbent premier, Edward Gawler Prior, from office. Prior had been found to have given an important construction contract to his own hardware business; though, he was later appointed as lieutenant governor himself. In 1952, without a clear majority in the legislative assembly following the general election, Lieutenant Governor Clarence Wallace was required to exercise his personal judgement in selecting the province's premier. Though the Co-operative Commonwealth Federation (CCF; now the New Democratic Party) held one fewer seat than the Social Credit Party (Socred), Wallace was under pressure to call on the CCF leader to form a government. Wallace, however, went with Socred leader W.A.C. Bennett, which resulted in the start of a 20-year dynasty for the latter.

The provincial election in 2017 resulted in neither the incumbent Liberals, nor the opposition New Democrats (NDP), winning a majority. The balance rested with the Green Party, which eventually agreed to support an NDP minority government with NDP leader John Horgan as premier. Still, Premier Christy Clark refused to resign until she could test the legislative assembly's confidence in her. As the vote on the Speech from the Throne is automatically a confidence vote and the speech was voted down, Clark's government fell. She advised Lieutenant Governor Judith Guichon to call a new elections, contending that the NDP would be unable to provide a stable government due to the need for one of its members to act as speaker, likely resulting in frequent tied votes that could be broken only by the speaker. Guichon disagreed and refused to dissolve the legislature. Clark then resigned and Guichon invited Horgan to form a government, which was sworn in by Guichon on 18 July.

During Guichon's time serving as lieutenant governor, she put a strong focus on the interaction of the Crown in British Columbia with the Indigenous peoples in the province, which she said needed to be defined by "respect, relationships, and responsibility", stating that the Canadian monarchy was central to the treaty relationship.

== See also ==
- Monarchy in the Canadian provinces
- Government of British Columbia
- Lieutenant governors of Canada

== Bibliography ==
- McGregor, D.A. (1967). They Gave Royal Assent - The Lieutenant-Governors of British Columbia. Burnaby: Mitchell Press Limited.
