= Law Society of British Columbia =

Regulatory body for lawyers in British Columbia, Canada

The Law Society of British Columbia
- The motto emblazoned on the crest of the Law Society's common seal is LEX LIBERORUM REX, meaning "Law is King of the Free" or "Law is the King of Children."
- Formation: 1869
- Type: Law Society
- Legal status: active
- Purpose: regulatory body, advocate and public voice, educator and network
- Headquarters: Vancouver, British Columbia
- Location: British Columbia
- Region served: British Columbia Canada
- Official language: English; French
- Executive Director/CEO: Don Avison
- Website: www.lawsociety.bc.ca

The Law Society of British Columbia is the regulatory body for lawyers in British Columbia, Canada.

== Purpose ==
The society's primary mandate under the Legal Profession Act is to uphold and protect the public interest in the administration of justice by preserving and protecting the rights and freedoms of all persons, ensuring the independence, integrity, honour and competence of lawyers, establishing standards and programs for the education, professional responsibility and competence of BC lawyers. The society is also mandated to regulate the practice of law, and support and assist lawyers, articled students and lawyers of other jurisdictions who are permitted to practise law in British Columbia in fulfilling their duties in the practice of law.

== Governance structure ==
The Law Society is overseen by a board of governors known as Benchers, composed of 25 lawyers elected by the registrants of the Law Society, up to six Benchers who are not lawyers and who are appointed by the government, and the attorney general of BC. The attorney general is typically represented in this role by the deputy attorney general. The Benchers are responsible for governing and administering the affairs of the Law Society including setting standards for admission, conduct and competence. These are established through the Law Society Rules. The Law Society is a member of the Federation of Law Societies of Canada, the national coordinating body of Canada's 14 law societies.

With the exception of the president, first vice-president and second vice-president, all elected Benchers, as well as all members of Bencher committees, subcommittees and task forces, are volunteers to the Law Society. Benchers serve two-year terms up to a maximum of four terms and can be re-elected. The senior Bencher is the president, who serves a one-year term in that position.

The executive director, or chief executive officer, of the Law Society directs the Society's operations.

== History ==
The roots of the Law Society trace back to England. Motivated in part by the new-found wealth of the gold rush, Queen Victoria dispatched an experienced English lawyer, Matthew Baillie Begbie, to establish and protect the lands to which her country laid claim.

Begbie crossed the Atlantic Ocean, bringing with him official documents establishing the Colony of British Columbia. Those papers were signed by Governor James Douglas on November 18, 1858, at Fort Langley. The following day, Begbie was sworn into office as high court judge of the colonies of British Columbia and Vancouver Island.

On December 24, 1858, Justice Begbie published an Order of the Court which gave the first official recognition to barristers and solicitors in the colonies. The Order noted that only one lawyer was qualified to act as a barrister in a court of law—Henry Pering Pellew Crease.

Crease believed that the legal profession needed to be regulated, particularly since Begbie's lengthy absences while administering justice in BC's vast frontier made it difficult for the judge to do so in a timely and effective manner. On July 15, 1869, Crease assembled 13 members of the legal profession in the colony. Together, they founded the Law Society of British Columbia, the objectives of which were: creation of a law library; publication of legal decisions; regulation of calls to the bar; and protection of the interests of the legal profession.

In 1874, the Province incorporated "The Incorporated Law Society of British Columbia." This act also provides for the election of Benchers, but it does not allow the Benchers to make certain regulations unless such are approved at a special or general meeting by the members.

The Province re-established "The Incorporated Law Society of British Columbia" in 1877. This act allows the benchers to make rules without the approval of the members. This Act allows the Benchers to make regulations without the approval of the members. It also allows for Barristers and Attorneys "from other Courts, countries or Provinces...to be place on the Roll of Barristers or Attorneys of the Supreme Court of British Columbia."

In 1884, the Province gave the Law Society of British Columbia its current form by incorporating the Benchers as the "Law Society of British Columbia.". This act transferred the money and property of "The Incorporated Law Society of British Columbia" to the newly incorporated Society.

=== Historical timeline ===
- 1869: the Law Society is founded
- 1874: The Incorporated Law Society of British Columbia incorporated
- 1877: The Incorporated Law Society of British Columbia re-established, with certain modifications.
- 1884: Benchers incorporated as the Law Society of British Columbia
- 1912: the first woman, Mabel Penery French, is called to the Bar in BC
- 1921: the Law Society adopts the Canons of Legal Ethics
- 1947: the Law Society establishes a Special Compensation Fund for victims of theft by a lawyer
- 1953: the first Chinese Canadian, Andrew Joe, is called to the Bar in BC
- 1957: the first Black Canadian, Edsworth McAuley Searles, is called to the Bar in BC
- 1958: the first Japanese Canadian, George Fujisawa is called to the Bar in BC
- 1962: the first Aboriginal person, Alfred J. Scow, is called to the Bar in BC
- 1969: the Law Society proposes a Legal Aid Society
- 1970: the Law Society publishes the Professional Conduct Handbook
- 1971: the first woman, Mary Southin, QC, is elected a Bencher
- 1980: the first Benchers’ Bulletin is published
- 1983: the Law Society begins the Professional Legal Training Program for new lawyers
- 1988: the first Benchers without a legal background are appointed; among them is well-known BC journalist Jack Webster
- 1993: the Oath of Allegiance is no longer automatically tendered to lawyers upon call and admission

== Functions of the Law Society ==
Law Society of BC provides a range of services for lawyers and the public including:

- determining the standards for admission to the legal profession;
- providing several educational programs and overseeing the required annual ongoing development program for lawyers;
- setting ethical standards for all lawyers;
- setting practice standards of competency;
- providing liability insurance for lawyers and trust protection coverage for the public;
- investigating allegations of lawyer misconduct, resolving complaints and taking disciplinary action where necessary.

=== Determining the standards for admission to the legal profession ===
The Law Society ensures new lawyers are qualified to practice in BC by managing admissions and credentials.

The Professional Legal Training Course (PLTC) is the Law Society's 10-week, bar admission course. Successful completion of the course is one of the requirements for becoming a lawyer in BC. PLTC emphasises practical skills training, ethics, practice management and procedure to help new lawyers bridge the gap between law school and practice.

The Credentials Committee is responsible for overseeing the enrolment, education, examination and call to the bar of articled students, the transfer of lawyers to BC and the reinstatement of former lawyers. When the character or fitness of an applicant for admission, readmission or transfer needs to be addressed, the committee considers the application directly or orders a formal credentials hearing. The committee is also responsible for reviewing applications relating to a student's failed standing in PLTC and for considering any matters arising from the articling system.

=== Educational programs ===
The Law Society provides several educational programs online and oversees the mandatory continuing professional development program. It requires that, each calendar year, all practising BC lawyers complete and report completion of at least 12 hours of continuing professional development in accredited educational activities.

=== Setting ethical standards for all lawyers ===
The Law Society employs a team of staff lawyers, designated as practice advisors and dedicated to giving professional ethical advice. In carrying out their work, BC lawyers must maintain acceptable standards of conduct, many of which are set out in the Code of Professional Conduct for British Columbia (BC Code), as adopted by the Benchers.

Chapter 2 of the BC Code contains the Canons of Legal Ethics, which sets out some of the overriding principles of ethical conduct. It is a lawyer's duty to promote the interests of the state, serve the cause of justice, maintain the authority and dignity of the courts, be faithful to clients, be candid and courteous in relations with other lawyers and demonstrate personal integrity.

The Ethics Committee assists the Benchers in the setting ethical standards for BC lawyers. The committee identifies current professional responsibility issues and makes recommendations on changes to the BC Code for consideration by the Benchers. The committee also interprets existing BC Code rules, gives advice to individual lawyers and publishes opinions to the profession at large on matters of professional responsibility.

=== Setting practice standards of competency ===
To qualify as competent, the Law Society maintains that a lawyer in BC must acquire and maintain adequate knowledge of the substantive law, knowledge of the practice and procedures by which that substantive law can be effectively applied and skills to represent the client's interests effectively.

The Practice Standards Committee reviews information about lawyers who may have competency-related problems and, when appropriate, orders investigations. The Committee recommends ways for lawyers with competency problems to become competent, such as through remedial programs, or restricts them from some areas of practice when necessary to protect the public. The committee also helps plan programs to assist lawyers to practise more competently and maintain their own competence, and assists the Benchers in setting competency-related policy.

=== Providing liability insurance for lawyers ===
The Lawyers Insurance Fund is the program established by the Law Society to provide insurance for BC lawyers, and protects the profession and the public from the risks associated with the practice of law by providing high quality professional liability and defalcation insurance.

Professional liability insurance protects lawyers who are liable for negligence and ensures that clients receive compensation to which they are entitled.

Lawyers are also protected if they fall victim to the "bad cheque" scam, helping ensure that clients do not suffer a financial loss.

=== Providing trust protection coverage to the public ===
Since 1949, the Law Society has provided financial protection so that innocent members of the public do not suffer hardship because of the actions of a dishonest lawyer. Since 2004, this protection has been provided under the compulsory insurance program of the Lawyers Insurance Fund.

Law firms are required to submit an annual trust report to the Law Society. Some are also asked to file an additional accountant's report if a further review is necessary. Law Society compliance auditors conduct on-site audits of all law firms at least once every six years. The goal of the audits is to help law firms correct minor problems with record-keeping, do an in-depth review of client files to ensure trust funds are being handled properly, to answer any questions lawyers may have about trust accounting. The audits also ensure lawyers develop proper accounting systems, record-keeping practices and trust fund handling procedures.

=== Investigating lawyer misconduct, resolving complaints and taking disciplinary action ===
The Law Society has authority to review the conduct and competence of lawyers practising in BC, including lawyers in private practice, legal aid lawyers, government lawyers and Crown prosecutors. The Law Society can also review the conduct of a lawyer outside the practice of law if the alleged conduct is in violation of the BC Code. Every formal complaint about conduct and competence is reviewed and considered, approximately 1,100 complaints are handled each year.

Like most regulatory bodies, the Law Society uses a system of progressive or graduated discipline to respond to lawyer violations of the Act, Rules and the BC Code.

After a full investigation, about 13-16% of complaints made to the Law Society are considered for progressive discipline.

These complaints are referred to the Discipline Committee, which then decides whether any further action is required and if so, whether to issue letter of reprimand, order a conduct meeting or conduct review or direct that a citation be issued.

== Honours and awards ==
The Benchers offer formal recognition of those in the legal community for achievement and service to the public and the profession.
