= Provincial Court of British Columbia =

Canadian trial court

- The Royal Arms as used by the Provincial Court
- Established: 1969
- Jurisdiction: British Columbia
- Authorised by: Provincial Court Act
- Number of positions: 150
- Website: provincialcourt.bc.ca

Chief Judge
- Currently: Melissa Gillespie
- Since: 2018

The Provincial Court of British Columbia (BC Provincial Court) is a trial level court in British Columbia that hears cases in criminal, civil and family matters.

The Provincial Court is a creation of statute, and as such its jurisdiction is limited to only those matters over which is permitted by statute. It has no inherent jurisdiction, other than to the limited degree in which it may control its own procedures. Its caseload falls into one of four main categories: criminal and youth matters; family matters; small claims matters; and traffic and bylaw matters.

In criminal matters, it is a trial court for all summary conviction offences. For indictable criminal offences, it can be a trial court if an accused person elects to have his or her trial in that court. When an accused charged with an indictable offence elects trial by a superior court (the British Columbia Supreme Court), his preliminary inquiry will be held in the Provincial Court. The court will also deal with bail applications on most criminal charges except murder and a select few other offences. It is also designated as the Youth Justice Court under the Youth Criminal Justice Act of Canada.

In civil matters, the Small Claims division of the court is limited to claims for debt or damages up to $35,000, or where the claimant agrees to abandon his or her claim for any amount in excess of $35,000. The Provincial Court also has limited family law jurisdiction, except for divorce proceedings and the division of matrimonial property. The Supreme Court of British Columbia shares jurisdiction over all matters that may be heard by the Provincial Court, except where exclusive jurisdiction may be conferred by statute on the Provincial Court.

Judges of the Provincial Court are appointed by the provincial cabinet, on recommendation of the Attorney General. In court, judges are referred to as "Your Honour".

All courts in the Province of British Columbia display the Royal coat of arms of the United Kingdom, as a symbol of its judiciary.

== See also ==
- Supreme Court of British Columbia
- British Columbia Court of Appeal
- Powell Janulus, court translator for Provincial Court of British Columbia, who can speak 42 languages and certified to translate 28 of them in the court
