= British Columbia Court of Appeal =

Court of appeal in Canada

- The Royal Arms as used by the Court of Appeal
- Established: 1909
- Location: Vancouver (central registry), Victoria, Kamloops and Kelowna
- Authorised by: Court of Appeal Act, 1996
- Appeals to: Supreme Court of Canada
- Number of positions: 15
- Website: bccourts.ca/Court_of_Appeal/

Chief Justice
- Currently: Leonard Marchand
- Since: December 8, 2023

The British Columbia Court of Appeal (BCCA) is the highest appellate court in the province of British Columbia, Canada. It was established in 1910 following the 1907 Court of Appeal Act.

== Jurisdiction ==
The BCCA hears appeals from the Supreme Court of British Columbia and a number of boards and tribunals. The BCCA also hears criminal appeals from the Provincial Court of British Columbia where the proceedings in that court were by indictment. It will hear summary conviction appeals from the Supreme Court on criminal matters that originated in the Provincial Court. Statute restricts appeals on civil matters from the Provincial Court (Small Claims) to the Supreme Court. However, some Provincial Court civil matters may come before the BCCA on very narrow matters having to do with questions of administrative law or other unusual circumstances.

== Composition ==
The BCCA consists of 15 justices (including a chief justice) in addition to 9 supernumerary justices. All justices of the BCCA (including the position of Chief Justice) are appointed by the federal government. The central registry for the BCCA is in Vancouver, where the BCCA holds most of its sittings. The BCCA also occasionally hears cases in Victoria, Kelowna, and Kamloops. The judges for the court also double as judges for the Yukon Court of Appeal. Cases from Yukon are heard in both Vancouver and in Whitehorse.

A full division of the court consists of five justices; however, most cases are heard by a division of three justices. A single justice will preside over matters heard in "chambers", usually interlocutory matters or applications for leave to appeal. On occasion, and with especially challenging or controversial matters, five judges will be appointed to hear the appeal.

== Procedure ==
Unlike in Ontario where a sitting of the Court of Appeal is referred to as a "panel", in the BCCA a sitting of the court is referred to as a "division".

Counsel appearing in the BCCA are required to "gown". This court dress is identical to that worn in the Supreme Court of British Columbia, and consists of a white wing collar with tabs, along with a black bar jacket and black gown (some counsel will wear a black waistcoat and suit rather than a bar jacket). Male barristers will generally wear black or striped trousers, with female barristers wearing either trousers or a skirt. King's Counsel wear a more elaborate bar jacket as well as a silk gown. Court dress is not required for matters heard in Chambers, wherein standard business dress can be worn by both counsel and the sitting justice.

All courts in the province of British Columbia display the Arms of His Majesty in Right of the United Kingdom, as a symbol of its judiciary.

== Courthouse ==
The court moved from its previous location (what is now the Vancouver Art Gallery) to the present Arthur Erickson designed Vancouver Law Courts in 1980. One of the courtrooms from the old courthouse was reconstructed in the new building; when in session, a division of the court will often preside in this Heritage Courtroom (Courtroom 50).

== Current justices ==
Name	Appointed	Nominated by	Prior position
Chief Justice Leonard Marchand	December 8, 2023 (as Chief Justice); March 24, 2021 (as Justice)	Trudeau	Supreme Court of British Columbia (June 21, 2017 to March 24, 2021); Provincial Court of British Columbia (September 3, 2013 to June 21, 2017)
Madam Justice Joyce DeWitt-Van Oosten	May 6, 2019	Trudeau	Supreme Court of British Columbia (October 20, 2016 to May 6, 2019)
Madam Justice Karen Horsman	April 20, 2022	Trudeau	Supreme Court of British Columbia (August 31, 2018 to April 20, 2022)
Madam Justice Janet Winteringham	December 4, 2023	Trudeau	Supreme Court of British Columbia (August 17, 2017 to December 4, 2023)
Madam Justice Margot Fleming	May 27, 2024	Trudeau	Supreme Court of British Columbia (June 7, 2013 to May 27, 2024)
Madam Justice Nitya Iyer	May 27, 2024	Trudeau	Supreme Court of British Columbia (June 14, 2017 to May 27, 2024)
Madam Justice Sheri Ann Donegan	August 29, 2024	Trudeau	Supreme Court of British Columbia (2013 to 2024)
Mr. Justice Paul Riley	August 29, 2024	Trudeau	Supreme Court of British Columbia (2017 to 2024)
Mr. Justice Peter Edelmann	October 28, 2024	Trudeau	Supreme Court of British Columbia (2019 to 2024)
Mr. Justice Geoffrey Gomery	November 12, 2024	Trudeau	Supreme Court of British Columbia (2018 to 2024)
Madam Justice Lisa Warren	March 3, 2025	Trudeau	Supreme Court of British Columbia (2013 to 2025)
Mr. Justice Andrew Mayer	March 3, 2025	Trudeau	Supreme Court of British Columbia (2017 to 2025)
Madam Justice Heather MacNaughton	March 7, 2025	Trudeau	Supreme Court of British Columbia (2016 to 2025)

Supernumerary

Name	Appointed	Nominated by	Prior position
Mr. Justice Harvey M. Groberman (Supernumerary)	May 9, 2008	Harper	Supreme Court of British Columbia (December 14, 2001 to May 8, 2008)
Mr. Justice David C. Harris (Supernumerary)	April 10, 2012	Harper	Supreme Court of British Columbia (March 19, 2010 to April 5, 2012)
Mr. Justice Peter M. Willcock (Supernumerary)	June 7, 2013	Harper	Supreme Court of British Columbia (June 19, 2009 to June 6, 2013)
Madam Justice Lauri Ann Fenlon (Supernumerary)	June 26, 2015	Harper	Supreme Court of British Columbia (January 31, 2008 to June 26, 2015)
Madam Justice Gail M. Dickson (Supernumerary)	September 1, 2015	Harper	Supreme Court of British Columbia (December 15, 2006 to July 28, 2015)
Madam Justice Barbara L. Fisher (Supernumerary)	September 15, 2017	Trudeau	Supreme Court of British Columbia (November 26, 2004 to September 15, 2017)
Madam Justice Susan A. Griffin (Supernumerary)	February 7, 2018	Trudeau	Supreme Court of British Columbia (February 20, 2008 to February 7, 2018)
Mr. Justice Bruce Butler (Supernumerary)	August 31, 2018	Trudeau	Supreme Court of British Columbia (March 30, 2007 to August 31, 2018)
Mr. Justice Patrice Abrioux (Supernumerary)	March 8, 2019	Trudeau	Supreme Court of British Columbia (September 30, 2011 to March 8, 2019)
Mr. Justice Christopher Grauer (Supernumerary)	December 20, 2019	Trudeau	Supreme Court of British Columbia (April 11, 2008 to December 20, 2019)

== Chief justices ==
Since 1929, the Chief Justice of the BCCA has had the rank of Chief Justice of British Columbia.

- 2023–present Leonard Marchand
- 2013–2023 Robert J. Bauman
- 2001–2013 Lance Finch
- 1988–2001 Allan McEachern
- 1979–1988 Nathaniel Nemetz
- 1973–1978 John Lauchlan Farris
- 1967–1972 Herbert William Davey
- 1964–1967 Henry Irvine Bird
- 1963–1964 Sherwood Lett
- 1958–1963 Alexander Campbell DesBrisay
- 1944–1957 Gordon McGregor Sloan
- 1942–1944 David Alexander McDonald
- 1940–1941 Malcolm Archibald Macdonald
- 1937–1940 Archer Martin
- 1909–1937 James Alexander MacDonald (Chief Justice of the Court of Appeal)
- 1902–1929 Gordon Hunter (Chief Justice of the Supreme Court)

== Past justices ==
Name	Duration	Nominated by	Prior position
Mr. Justice P.D. Lowry	June 30, 2003 - 2018	Chretien	Supreme Court of British Columbia
Madam Justice Kathryn E. Neilson	May 9, 2008 - 2016	Stephen Harper (BCCA)	Supreme Court of British Columbia
Christopher E. Hinkson (2010-2013)			
Jo-Ann E. Prowse (1992-2013)			
Catherine Anne Ryan (1994-2013)			
Lance Finch (Chief Justice) (1993-2013)			
M. Anne Rowles (1991-2011)			
Carol Mahood Huddart (1996-2011)			
Kenneth C. Mackenzie (1998-2011)			
Ronald I. Cheffins (1985-1987)			
Allan D. Thackray (2001-2007)			
M.F. Southin (1988-2006)			
Thomas R. Braidwood (1996-2005)			
William A. Esson (1983-1989) (1996-2005) (Chief Justice, B.C. Supreme Court 1989-1996)			
Wallace T. Oppal (2003-2005)			
John Douglas Lambert (1978-2005)			
H.A. Hollinrake (1990-2004)			
Patricia M. Proudfoot (1989-2002)			
G.S. Cumming (1989-2001)			
Allan McEachern (Chief Justice) (1988-2001)			
D.B. Hinds (1990-1999)			
D.M.M. ("Michael") Goldie (1991-1999)			
A. B. Macfarlane (1982-1999)			
R. J. Gibbs (1989-1999)			
A.B.B. Carrothers (1973-1998)			
H.P. Legg (1989-1997)			
E.E. Hinkson (1977-1996)			
H.E. Hutcheon (1980-1996)			
Josiah Wood (1989-1996)			
Samuel Toy (1988-1993)			
Beverley McLachlin (1985-1988)			(Appointed puisne justice of the Supreme Court of Canada 1989-2000; appointed Chief Justice of Canada (2000–2017))
Bryan Williams			
Robert J. Bauman	June 16, 2013 - October 1, 2023	Harper	Chief Justice of the Supreme Court of British Columbia (September 9, 2009 to June 16, 2013); Puisne Justice, British Columbia Court of Appeal (February 20, 2008 to September 9, 2009); Supreme Court Justice (June 20, 1996 to February 20, 2008)
