= Supreme Court of British Columbia =

British Columbia's superior trial court

- The Royal Arms of the United Kingdom, used by the Supreme Court
- Jurisdiction: British Columbia
- Location: Cariboo; Kootenay; Nanaimo; Prince Rupert; Vancouver; Victoria; New Westminster; and Yale
- Authorised by: Supreme Court Act, 1996
- Appeals to: British Columbia Court of Appeal
- Number of positions: 102
- Website: bccourts.ca/supreme_court/

Chief Justice
- Currently: Ron Skolrood
- Since: October 2024

The Supreme Court of British Columbia is the superior trial court for the province of British Columbia, Canada. The Court hears civil and criminal law cases as well as appeals from the Provincial Court of British Columbia. There are 90 judicial positions on the Court in addition to supernumerary judges, making for a grand total of 108 judges. There are also 13 Supreme Court masters, who hear and dispose of a wide variety of applications in chambers.

The court was established in 1859 as the "Supreme Court of the Mainland of British Columbia" to distinguish it from the "Supreme Court of Vancouver Island". The two courts merged in 1870 under the present name.

== Jurisdiction ==
The British Columbia Supreme Court is a court of record and has original jurisdiction in all cases, civil and criminal, arising in British Columbia. The Court has inherent jurisdiction under the Constitution of Canada, in addition to any jurisdiction granted to it by federal or provincial statute.

The Court has jurisdiction in any civil dispute, including those matters where the dollar amount involved is within the jurisdiction of the Small Claims division of the Provincial Court. Under the Criminal Code, the Court is included as a "superior court of criminal jurisdiction" meaning that it has exclusive jurisdiction for the trial of serious crimes within British Columbia.

The Court also hears some appeals from the Provincial Court and some administrative tribunals. Appeals from its own judgments are heard by the British Columbia Court of Appeal.

The Supreme Court is also responsible for call ceremonies for admitting lawyers and notaries public where the respective oath of office is administered by a justice.

== Judges and associate judges ==
All justices of the Supreme Court (including the position of Chief Justice and Associate Chief Justice) are appointed by the federal cabinet, on recommendation of the Minister of Justice. All justices have full jurisdiction over any matter before the Court.

Associate judges are appointed by the provincial cabinet, on recommendation of the Attorney General in consultation with the Chief Justice. As provincial appointees, associate judges do not have inherent jurisdiction. Their jurisdiction is limited to those matters granted to them by statute and the Rules of Court. Associate judges preside in chambers, where they usually hear interlocutory applications and other pre-trial matters. Associate judges cannot hear civil trials and do not preside in criminal matters.

Associate judges were originally known as masters. Pursuant to a British Columbia Order in Council, the position was renamed from "master" to "associate judge". In court, masters were addressed as "Master," but in a practice direction issued on September 6, 1991, then Chief Justice Esson advised the most appropriate form of address would be "your Honour". Masters also sit and hear matters as registrars, hearing such matters as assessments of solicitors fees and accounts.

== Judicial districts ==
The Supreme Court sits in eight judicial districts called "counties". That is the only usage of "county" in British Columbia, which is a reference only to such court districts and has no similarity to the meaning in other provinces of Canada, the United States or United Kingdom. Prior to 1990, there existed in British Columbia a County Court, an intermediate court between the Provincial Court and the Supreme Court. In 1990, the County Court was merged with the Supreme Court, and its judges became justices of the Supreme Court. The judicial districts of the Supreme Court have the same boundaries of the counties of the former County Court. The judicial districts are: Cariboo; Kootenay; Nanaimo; Prince Rupert; Vancouver Westminster; Victoria; and Yale. Within each county, or judicial district, justices are resident in the following locations:

- Abbotsford
- Chilliwack
- Cranbrook
- Kamloops
- Kelowna
- Nanaimo
- Nelson
- New Westminster
- Prince George
- Prince Rupert
- Victoria
- Vancouver

The Supreme Court also holds sittings in the following court locations for which there is not a resident justice:

- Campbell River
- Courtenay
- Dawson Creek
- Duncan
- Fort Nelson
- Fort St. John
- Golden
- Penticton
- Port Alberni
- Powell River
- Quesnel
- Revelstoke
- Rossland
- Salmon Arm
- Smithers
- Terrace
- Vernon
- Williams Lake

== Chief Justices of the Supreme Court ==
Prior to 1909, when the British Columbia Court of Appeal was established, the Chief Justice of the Supreme Court was considered the Chief Justice of British Columbia.

Name	Duration
Ron Skolrood	2024-Present
Christopher E. Hinkson	2013–2024
Robert James Bauman	2009–2013
Donald Ian Brenner	2000–2009
Bryan Williams	1996–2000
William A. Esson	1989–1996
Beverley McLachlin (afterwards Chief Justice of Canada, 2000–2017)	1988–1989
Allan McEachern (afterwards Chief Justice of BC Court of Appeal, 1988)	1979–1988
Nathaniel Nemetz (afterwards Chief Justice of BC Court of Appeal, 1979)	1973–1979
John Owen Wilson	1963–1973
Sherwood Lett (afterwards Chief Justice of BC Court of Appeal, 1963)	1955–1963
Wendell Burpee Farris (died 1955)	1942–1955
Aulay MacAulay Morrison	1929–1942
Gordon Hunter	1902–1929
Angus John McColl	1898–1902
Theodore Davie	1895–1898
Matthew Baillie Begbie (incumbent Chief Justice of the Colony of British Columbia at the time B.C. joined Canada)	1869–1894

== Associate Chief Justices of the Supreme Court ==
Name	Duration
Heather J. Holmes	2018–present
Austin F. Cullen	2011–2017
Anne W. MacKenzie	2010–2011
Patrick D. Dohm	1995–2010
