= List of University of British Columbia people =

This is a list of alumni and faculty from the University of British Columbia.

== Alumni ==
=== Nobel laureates ===
Alumni of the University of British Columbia

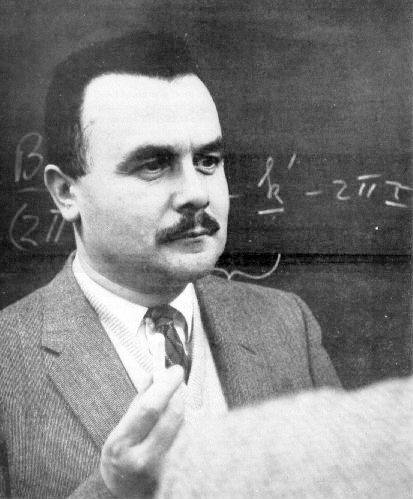
Bertram Brockhouse, BA 1947, Nobel laureate (Physics, 1994)

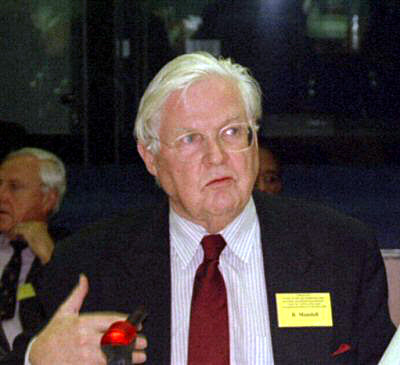
Robert Mundell, BA 1953, Nobel laureate (Economics, 1999)

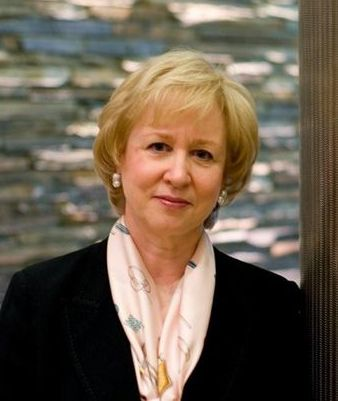
Kim Campbell, BA 1969, 19th Prime Minister of Canada

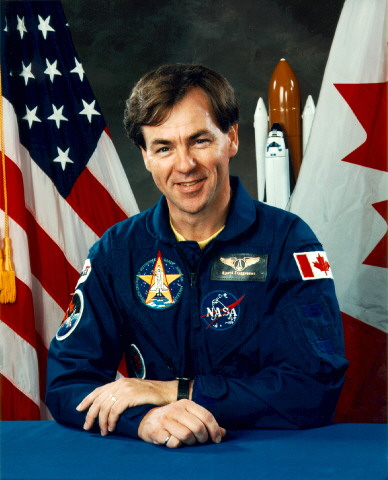
Bjarni Tryggvason, BS 1972, NRC/CSA astronaut

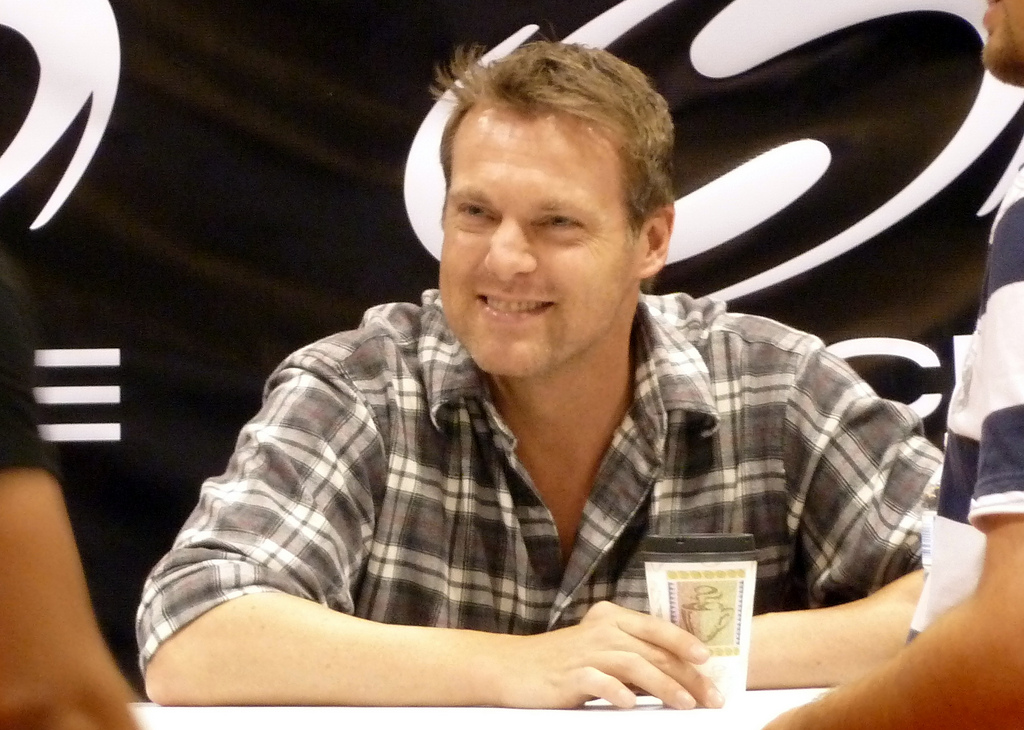
Michael Shanks, BFA 1994, actor (portrayed Dr. Daniel Jackson in the television series Stargate SG-1)

- Bertram Brockhouse, BA 1947 (math and physics), Nobel laureate (Physics, 1994) "for the development of neutron spectroscopy"
- Robert Mundell, BA 1953, Nobel laureate (Economics, 1999) "for his analysis of monetary and fiscal policy under different exchange rate regimes and his analysis of optimum currency areas"

=== Rhodes Scholars ===
- Dominic Barton (1984)

=== Academia ===
- Kanti Bajpai, former headmaster of The Doon School
- Amit Chakma, President, University of Western Ontario
- Patricia Churchland, philosopher
- John J. Clague, Geological Survey of Canada scientist and SFU professor
- Heather M. Ferguson FRSE Professor of Medical Entomology and Disease Ecology, at Glasgow University; a specialist in researching mosquito vectors that spread malaria
- Thomas Martin Franck, international law scholar; NYU Law Professor Emeritus; former Editor-In-Chief of the American Journal of International Law
- James Giles (philosopher) philosopher
- Rick Hansen, educator and Man in Motion
- Michiel Horn, historian, professor emeritus, Glendon College, York University
- Joy Johnson, Vice-President Research, Simon Fraser University
- Ravi S. Menon, Canadian-American biophysicist and Professor The University of Western Ontario
- Margaret C. Miller, archaeologist and the Arthur and Renee George Professor of Classical Archaeology
- Mayo Moran, Professor of Law, Provost and Vice-Chancellor of Trinity College, Toronto
- Santa J. Ono, President & Vice-Chancellor, University of British Columbia
- Geraldine Pratt (geographer) Head of Geography and the Canada Research Chair in Care Economies and Global Labour for the Government of Canada.
- Indira Samarasekera, President, University of Alberta
- Peter Todd, former dean of McGill University's Desautels Faculty of Management, dean of HEC Paris
- David Turpin, President, University of Victoria and University of Alberta

=== Architecture ===
- Arthur Erickson, AIA Gold Medal-winning architect of buildings including the Museum of Anthropology at UBC
- Bing Thom, architect of various urban design projects around Canada and the United States

=== Business ===
- David Cheriton, Google founding investor and computer science professor at Stanford University
- Dominic Barton, Global managing director of McKinsey & Co.
- Andrew Bibby, BCom 1980, president, Grosvenor Americas
- Yael Cohen, non-profit executive and philanthropist; founder of Fuck Cancer
- Herb Dhaliwal, businessman, real estate developer and philanthropist
- Herb Emery, economist and professor
- Lalith Gamage, CEO of Sri Lanka Institute of Information Technology
- Martin Glynn, MBA 1972, president and CEO, HSBC Canada
- Lindsay Gordon, MBA 1976, CEO of HSBC Canada, Chancellor, University of British Columbia
- Darren Huston, former president and CEO of Priceline
- Frank Iacobucci, BCom 1961, former Puisne Justice, Supreme Court of Canada; former Dean, University of Toronto's Faculty of Law
- David Ing, marketing scientist and senior consultant
- Paul Lee, former president of Electronic Arts
- Brandt C. Louie, president and CEO of H.Y. Louie Co. Limited, and Chairman of London Drugs Limited
- Kyle MacDonald, blogger and founder of the One red paperclip website
- John H. McArthur, BCom 1957, Dean Emeritus, Harvard Business School
- Henry McKinnell, CEO and chairman of the board, Pfizer
- Nadir Mohamed, BCom 1978, CEO, Rogers Communications
- Sarah Morgan-Silvester BCom 1982, former Chancellor, University of British Columbia
- Jim Pattison, chief executive officer, chairman and sole owner of the Jim Pattison Group, the second largest privately held company in Canada (did not graduate)
- Shahrzad Rafati, BSc Computer Science 2005, CEO, BroadbandTV Corp
- Ben Rutledge, BCom 2006, Canadian rower and '08 Olympic gold medalist
- Gregg Saretsky, MBA 1984, President & CEO, WestJet
- William Sauder, BCom 1948, Chairman of International Forest Products Ltd. and Sauder Industries; contributor to the Sauder School of Business; former Chancellor of UBC
- Patrick Soon-Shiong, South African-American surgeon and chairman of NantHealth
- Peter Wall, property developer in Vancouver; played a significant and controversial part in the city's real-estate boom in the 1992-2000s; established the Peter Wall Institute for Advanced Studies (did not graduate)
- Nolan Watson, co-founder of Sandstorm Resources Ltd.; known for his contribution to finance innovation in the mining industry; youngest CFO (age 26) of a New York Stock Exchange listed company; helped develop the silver streaming business model; raise over $1 billion in debt and equity to fund Silver Wheaton's growth into the largest streaming company in the world
- Kevin Ma, entrepreneur, Publisher, founder of Hypebeast.com,
- Brian Wong, internet entrepreneur; co-founded Kiip, a mobile app rewards platform; in 2010 surpassed Mark Zuckerberg to become youngest entrepreneur to raise venture capital funding
- Jacki Zehner, BCom 1987, President of Women Moving Millions; youngest woman to be made a partner in Goldman Sachs, in 1996

=== Government, politics, and law ===
- David Anderson, former Cabinet Minister, and former President of the Governing Council of the UN Environment Programme
- Demas Akpore, Nigerian politician and academic
- Jack Austin, former Cabinet Minister, and former Leader of the Government in the Senate
- John Alan Beesley, diplomat; former UN Ambassador
- Thomas Berger, First Nations' rights advocate; politician; former Justice of the Supreme Court of British Columbia
- Gary Botting, leading authority on Canada's extradition law, entomologist, author and poet
- Donald Brenner, former Chief Justice of the Supreme Court of British Columbia
- Kim Campbell, former Prime Minister of Canada
- Pat Carney, Canadian senator
- Arnold Chan, lawyer, former provincial Chief of Staff and aide (Ontario) and federal MP in Toronto
- Jim Chu, Chief Constable of the Vancouver Police Department
- Glen Clark, 31st Premier of British Columbia
- Elizabeth Denham, Information and Privacy Commissioner, British Columbia, 2010–6
- Patrick Dohm, Former Associate Chief Justice of British Columbia
- Ujjal Dosanjh, former B.C. premier
- Lance Finch, Chief Justice of British Columbia
- barbara findlay, Canadian lawyer
- Kerry-Lynne Findlay, Canadian lawyer and politician
- John Fraser, former Speaker of the House of Commons and Progressive Conservative MP
- Garde Gardom, former Lieutenant Governor of British Columbia
- Wade Grant, member of Parliament and Parliamentary Secretary to the Minister of Environment and Climate Change
- Robert Hampton Gray, awarded the Victoria Cross for heroism during World War II
- Mike Harcourt, former B.C. premier
- Nancy Heppner, Member of the Saskatchewan Legislative Assembly
- Russ Hiebert, Member of Parliament for South Surrey—White Rock—Cloverdale
- Frank Iacobucci, former Puisne Justice on the Supreme Court of Canada
- Ted Lee, former Head of the UN Economic and Social Affairs Section, former Ambassador to Israel, South Africa, Austria, former High Commissioner to Cypres, Lesotho, Swaziland, former Governor of Canada to the International Atomic Energy Agency
- Sherwood Lett, BA 1916, former Chief Justice of BC; former Chancellor of UBC
- Wendy Lisogar-Cocchia, Lieutenant Governor of British Columbia
- Rob Marris, British Labour party MP
- Allan McEachern, former Chancellor of UBC and Chief Justice of the Supreme Court of British Columbia
- Michael Omolewa, historian, diplomat and former President of UNESCO General Conference
- Wally Oppal, former Attorney General of British Columbia
- Stephen Owen, former Member of Parliament; former UBC V–P of External, Legal and Community Relations
- Richard Peck, Queen's Counsel and frequent Special Prosecutor
- Leslie Peterson, former Attorney General of BC and Chancellor of UBC
- Kiril Petkov, 17th Prime Minister of Bulgaria, 2021-2022
- Art Phillips, former mayor of Vancouver, British Columbia, Canada, 1973–1977
- Steven Point, Lieutenant Governor of British Columbia, 2007–2012
- Gregor Robertson, former mayor of Vancouver, 2008-2018, Member of Parliament and Minister of Housing and Infrastructure
- Svend Robinson, former NDP MP
- Randeep Sarai, member of Parliament
- Mark Satin, political activist and author
- Jake Sawatzky, member of Parliament
- Stanley Schumacher, Member of Parliament and Speaker of the Alberta Legislative Assembly
- Alfred Scow, the first First Nations judge in BC
- Ken Sim, mayor of Vancouver
- Bud Smith, former Attorney General of BC
- Justin Trudeau, the 23rd Prime Minister of Canada; former schoolteacher; eldest son of former Prime Minister Pierre Trudeau
- John Turner, former Prime Minister of Canada
- Patrick Weiler, member of Parliament
- Allan Williams, former Attorney General of BC
- John Yap, MBA 1983, former Minister of Advance Education and Minister Responsible for Multiculturalism, Province of BC

=== Journalism ===
- Ashleigh Banfield, CNN journalist
- Stevie Cameron, journalist
- Allan Fotheringham, journalist
- Tony Gallagher, journalist for The Province
- Robin Gill, anchor, Global News Toronto, Weekend Edition
- Nil Köksal, CBC Television journalist
- Duncan McCue, reporter for the CBC
- Laurence Meredith, United Press International reporter and later UPI's Portugal manager
- Blake Price, broadcaster
- Zafar Sobhan, Bangladeshi journalist and editor of the Dhaka Tribune

=== Literature ===
- Geoffrey Ashe, writer
- Earle Birney, poet
- Elizabeth Bachinsky, poet
- Pierre Berton, author and historian
- Cicely Belle Blain, poet and activist
- Gary Botting, poet, playwright, lawyer and legal scholar
- Will Clarke, novelist
- Sandra Djwa, writer
- Sarah Ens, poet
- Daniel Francis, historian and writer
- William Gibson, writer
- Genni Gunn, novelist and translator
- Valerie Haig-Brown, writer, editor, conservationist
- Hart Hanson, writer and show runner of Bones
- Anosh Irani, novelist and playwright
- Wanda John-Kehewin, poet
- Jessica Johns, writer
- Joan MacLeod, playwright
- Florence McNeil, poet and playwright
- Jane Munro, poet
- Angela Narth, children's author
- Gayla Reid, writer
- Renée Sarojini Saklikar, poet
- Jasmine Sealy, novelist and short story writer
- Bren Simmers, poet
- Gloria Cranmer Webster, activist and writer
- Rita Wong, poet

=== Music ===
- Michael Conway Baker, composer
- Alexander Gumuchian (bbno$), rapper
- Emily Haines, musician, Metric (band)
- Ben Heppner, tenor
- Anne Kang, BMus'99, Minister of Advanced Education and Skills Training of British Columbia
- Dan Mangan, musician
- Mark Takeshi McGregor, flutist
- Lance Ryan, tenor
- Natalie Ni Shi, operatic soprano
- Hildegard Westerkamp, composer
- Yung Kai, musician

=== Entertainment ===
- Lisa Ann Beley, voice actress
- Sonja Bennett, actress
- Andrea Brooks, actress
- Andrea Bang, actress, Kim's Convenience
- Diana Bang, actress
- Nicola Cavendish, actress
- Linda Chung, actress
- Julian Clarke, film editor
- Danica d'Hondt, actress
- Ann Marie Fleming, filmmaker, writer, and visual artist
- Judith Forst, mezzo-soprano
- Fran Gebhard, theatre director and actor
- Jason Gray-Stanford, actor
- Sturla Gunnarsson, Academy Award-nominated director
- Stephen Hegyes, film and television producer
- Ben Heppner, tenor
- Anne Heung, former Hong Kong actress
- Ed Hill, standup comedian
- Kris Holm, unicyclist
- Paul Johansson, actor
- Karen Lam, filmmaker
- Leanne Li, actress
- Andrea Libman, voice actress
- Evangeline Lilly, actress
- Bernice Liu, actress
- Spencer Lord, actor
- Evan Ma, actor
- Kenneth Ma, actor
- Greg Ng, film editor
- Grace Park, actress
- Eddie Peng, actor
- Manny Jacinto, actor, The Good Place
- Emily Perkins, actress
- John Ruskin, aka Nardwuar the Human Serviette, rock musician, radio, and television personality
- Michael Shanks, actor
- Hannah Simone, actress, New Girl
- Bruce Sweeney, filmmaker
- Anna Cathcart, actress
- Clint Hocking, video game designer and director
- Svetlana Zylin, playwright and director

=== Science and engineering ===
- Peggy Assinck, neuroscientist and ice sledge hockey silver medalist
- Albert Bandura, psychologist
- Stewart Blusson, diamond hunter and philanthropist
- Peter Borwein, mathematician
- Mary De Vera, pharmacoepidemiologist, health services researcher
- Vera Etches, physician and public health expert
- Charlotte Froese Fischer, mathematician and chemist
- Cecil Howard Green, geophysicist; co-founder of Texas Instruments; philanthropist who donated money for the Green College, University of British Columbia
- Andrej Karpathy, AI researcher
- Robert Langlands, mathematician specializing in automorphic forms and representation theory, Wolf Prize Laureate
- Parisa Mehrkhodavandi, chemist
- J. Don Read, psychologist
- Bjarni Tryggvason, astronaut
- Rabab Ward, signal processing engineer

=== Sports ===
- David Anderson, Olympic Silver Medalist in Rowing
- Donald Arnold, Olympic Gold Medalist in Rowing
- Laryssa Biesenthal, Olympic Bronze Medalist in Rowing
- Sohen Biln, Olympic Silver Medalist in Rowing
- Terry Cochrane, Canadian football player
- Megan Delehanty, Olympic Gold Medalist in Rowing
- Walter D'Hondt, Olympic Gold Medalist in Rowing
- Bruce Ford, Olympic rower
- Jeff Francis, Major League Baseball left-handed pitcher
- Felix Gelt, association football player
- Paul Girodo, football player
- Kyle Hamilton, Olympic Gold Medalist in Rowing
- Kathleen Heddle, three time Olympic Gold Medalist in Rowing
- Barbara Howard, sprinter
- George Hungerford, Olympic gold Medalist in Rowing
- Roger Jackson, Olympic Gold Medalist in Rowing
- Nelson Kuhn, Olympic Silver Medalist in Rowing
- John Lecky, Olympic Silver Medalist in Rowing
- Lorne Loomer, Olympic Gold Medalist in Rowing
- Archibald MacKinnon, Olympic Gold Medalist in Rowing
- Bill McKerlich, Olympic Silver Medalist in Rowing
- Glen Mervyn, Olympic Silver Medalist in Rowing
- Andrea Neil, women's soccer player and pioneer
- Pat Onstad, Major League Soccer goalkeeper, Houston Dynamo
- Annamay Pierse, world record-setting breaststroke swimmer
- David Pol, football player
- Ned Pratt, Olympic Bronze Medalist in Rowing, UBC's first Olympic Athlete
- Roy Radu, rugby union player
- Kevin Reynolds, figure skater; 2013 Four Continents champion and 2014 Winter Olympics team silver medalist
- Ben Rutledge, Olympic Gold Medalist in Rowing
- Tricia Smith, President of the Canadian Olympic Committee, and Olympic Silver Medalist
- Lara Mussell Savage, two time world champion in Ultimate
- Paul Steele, Olympic Gold Medalist in Rowing
- Brenda Taylor, Two time Olympic Gold Medalist in Rowing
- Tom Thomson, CFL player
- Pat Turner, Olympic Gold Medalist in Rowing
- Pieter Vanden Bos, football player

=== Visual arts ===
- Amy Malbeuf, visual artist, educator, and cultural tattoo practitioner
- Kimberly Phillips, educator and curator
- Theodore Wan, photographer and conceptual artist

== Faculty (former and current) ==
Faculty of the University of British Columbia

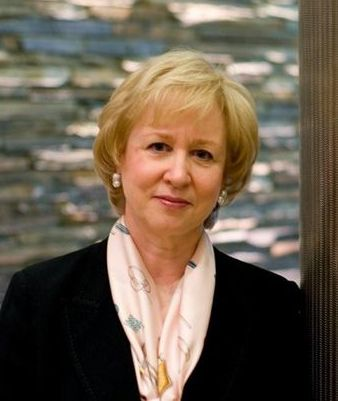
Kim Campbell, 19th Prime Minister of Canada

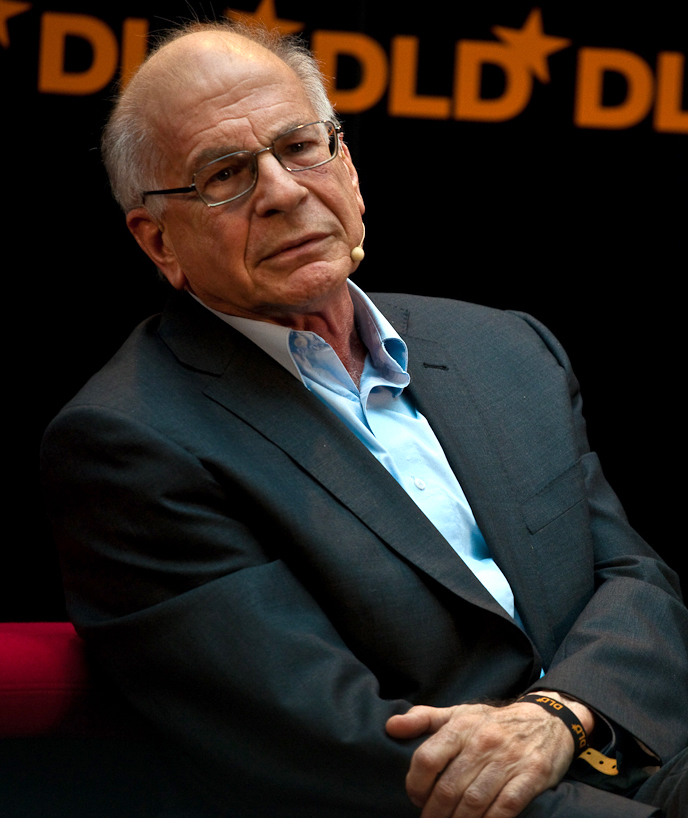
Daniel Kahneman, Nobel laureate (Economics, 2002)

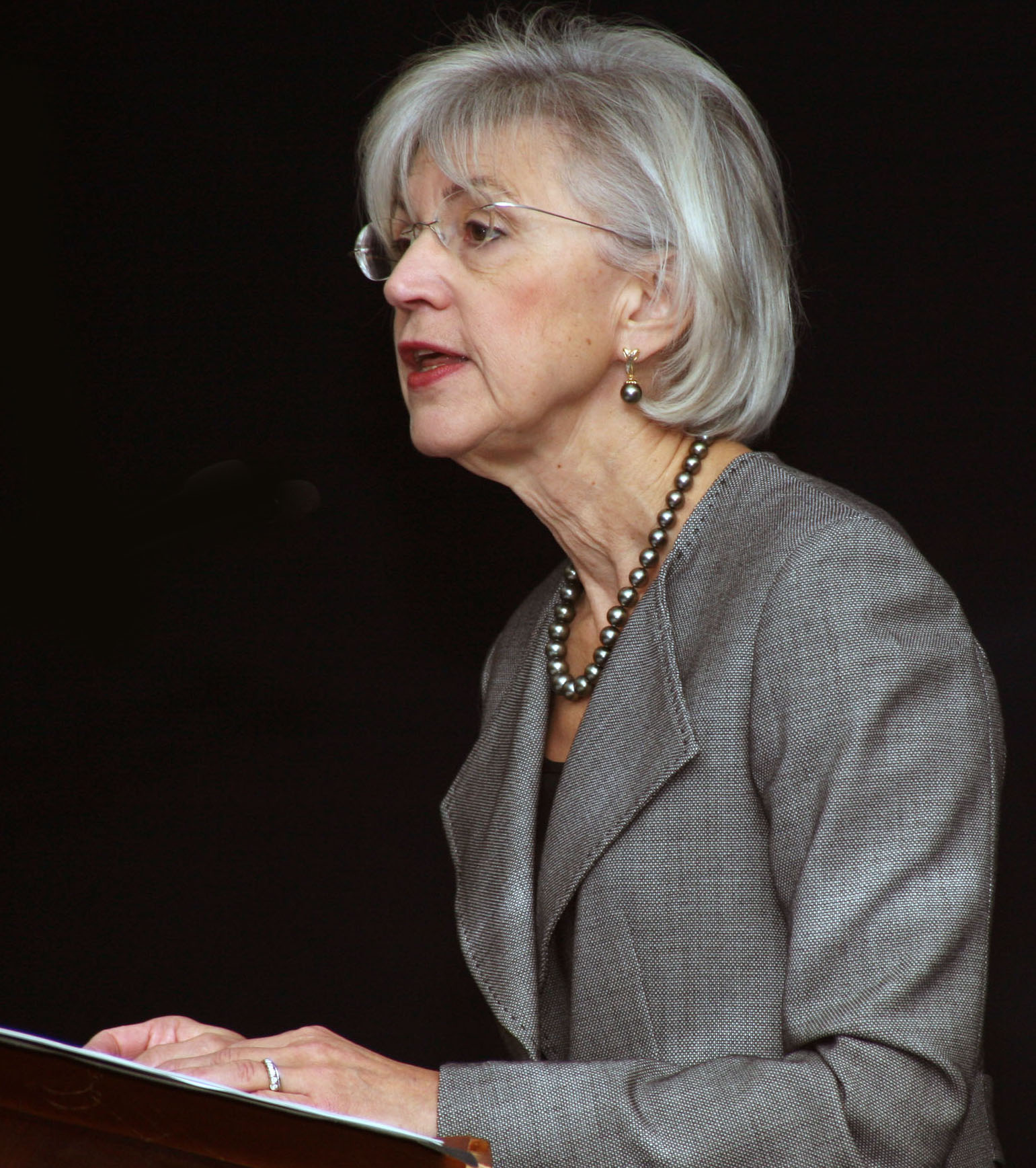
Beverley McLachlin, Chief Justice of the Supreme Court of Canada

=== Invested into the Order of Canada ===
- Father David Bauer OC (1967), Basilian priest, chaplain and ethics teacher at St. Mark's College (1961–1988)
- Basil Stuart-Stubbs, CM (2006), University Librarian (1964–1981)
- W.H. New OC (2007), Professor of English Literature (1965–2003)
- Jane Coop, CM (2013), Professor of Music (1980–2012)
- Clyde Hertzman, OC (2013), Professor of Population and Public Health (until 2013)
- Nassif Ghoussoub, OC (2016), FRSC, Professor of Mathematics (1979–present)
- Paula Gordon, CM (2023), Clinical Professor of Radiology
- Bob Hindmarch, CM (2019), professor and director of physical education (1961–1992)

=== Nobel laureates ===
- Hans G. Dehmelt, Nobel laureate (Physics, 1989); visiting researcher in 1955
- Daniel Kahneman, Nobel laureate (Economics, 2002); faculty member (1978–1986)
- Har Gobind Khorana, Nobel laureate (Medicine, 1968); faculty member (1952–1960)
- Michael Smith, Nobel laureate (Chemistry, 1993); professor of molecular biology (1966–2000)
- Richard Thaler, Nobel laureate (Economics, 2017); visiting associate professor (1984–1985)
- Carl E. Wieman, Nobel laureate (Physics, 2001); professor of physics (2007–2013)

=== Archaeology ===
- Richard J. Pearson, archaeologist and gardener

=== Architecture ===
- Arthur Erickson, architect

=== Business and economics ===
- Aslam Anis, health economist
- Brian Burke, former president and general manager of the Toronto Maple Leafs
- Rogemar Mamon, mathematician

=== Chemistry ===
- Laurel Schafer, Canada Research Chair in Catalyst Development, Full Professor (current)

=== English ===
- W. H. New, Professor of English Literature

=== First Nations and Indigenous studies ===
- Daniel Heath Justice, professor and chair of the First Nations Studies Program
- Glen Coulthard, Yellowknives Dene professor and political theorist

=== Geography ===
- Shahul Hasbullah, professor and researcher
- Avi Lewis, politician, journalist, filmmaker, and activist

=== History ===
- Timothy Brook (born 1951), sinologist
- George Stanley (1907–2002), historian; designer of Canadian flag; Lieutenant-Governor of New Brunswick
- Leslie Francis Stokes Upton (1931–1980), historian, author

=== Journalism ===
- David Rummel, Senior Producer of The New York Times; winner of Pulitzer Prize and the George Foster Peabody Awards
- Steve Woodward, Pulitzer Prize-winning journalist

=== Law ===
- David Eby, Premier of British Columbia, director of the British Columbia Civil Liberties Association from 2008 to 2012

=== Linguistics ===
- Robert John Gregg, linguist and specialist in Ulster Scots dialects and Canadian English
- Dale Kinkade, linguist and specialist on Salishan languages
- Edwin G. Pulleyblank, linguist and specialist in Old Chinese

=== Literature ===
- Margaret Atwood, novelist, poet, and literary critic
- Earle Birney, poet
- Joseph Boyden, writer
- Charlotte Gill, writer
- Roy Kiyooka, artist and poet
- Larissa Lai, writer
- Nancy Lee, writer
- Annabel Lyon, writer
- Keith Maillard, writer
- Marguerite-A. Primeau, Francophone writer
- Linda Svendsen, writer
- Timothy Taylor, writer
- Chia-ying Yeh, Chinese-Canadian poet and scholar of classical Chinese poetry

=== Music ===
- Stephanie Nakagawa, vocal teacher, winner of the Voice Gold Medal from the Royal Conservatory of Music
- Carol Wong, pianist, senior examiner at the Royal Conservatory of Music, first pianist to receive the Laureate Award from the Music Academy of the West
- Jasper Wood, chair, Strings Division Professor of Violin and Chamber Music
- Julia Nolan, saxophonist
- Fred Stride, Senior Sessional Lecturer, Jazz Theory and Arranging
- Jose Franch-Ballester, Assistant Professor, Clarinet and Chamber Music
- Nancy Hermiston, chair, Voice and Opera Divisions, director, UBC Opera Ensemble, Officer of the Order of Canada for her achievements as an opera singer, stage director, and educator
- Graeme Langager, Director of Choral Activities
- Andrew Dawes, Professor Emeritus of Music (2005), Violin, three-time Juno winner, Appointed Member of the Order of Canada in 1991
- T. Patrick Carrabré, director of the School of Music, professor, Composition, former associate composer for the Winnipeg Symphony Orchestra
- Krisztina Szabó, Assistant Professor, Voice and Opera
- Andrew Dawes, Professor Emeritus of Music (2005), Violin
- James Fankhauser, Professor Emeritus of Music (2000), Voice & Choral Conducting, former director, UBC University Singers
- Michael Tenzer, professor, Ethnomusicology, director, Balinese Gamelan Ensemble

=== Performing arts ===
- Joel Bakan, creator of The Corporation
- Sara Davis Buechner, pianist, recording artist, Koch International
- Meryn Cadell, writer and performance artist
- James Fankhauser, conductor
- Peter W. Klein, Emmy Award–winning journalist and filmmaker
- Barbara Pentland, composer
- Randy Raine-Reusch, composer and ethnomusicologist
- Lynne Stopkewich, film director
- Rachel Talalay, film and television director
- Patrick Walls, guitarist of Reverie Sound Revue

=== Physical education ===
- Ivor Wynne, director of intramural athletics and assistant director of physical education in the late 1940s

=== Political science ===
- Catherine Dauvergne, holds the Canada Research Chair in Migration Law
- Michael Ignatieff, academic, politician, and former Leader of the Opposition
- Norman MacKenzie
- Beverley McLachlin, former chief justice of the Supreme Court of Canada; professor at the University of British Columbia (1974–1981)

=== Psychology ===
- Larry Cochran, professor of Counseling Psychology
- Kenneth D. Craig, psychologist
- Steven Taylor (psychologist), psychologist
- Catharine Winstanley, behavioural neuroscientist

=== Science and engineering ===
- Catherine Anderson, Clinical Assistant Professor, researcher of pre-eclampsia
- Neil Bartlett, prepared the first known noble gas compound
- Vijay Bhargava, electrical engineer
- Wolfgang Bibel, one of the founders of the research area of Artificial Intelligence in Germany and Europe
- Frank E. Buck, Professor of Horticulture
- Nadine Caron, co-director of UBC's Centre for Excellence in Indigenous Health
- Brian Christie, neuroscientist
- David Dolphin, biochemist
- John Friedmann, urban theorist
- J. B. Gunn, semiconductor device physicist; discoverer of the Gunn Effect
- David F. Hardwick, medical academic and researcher in the field of paediatric pathology
- Sara Harris, climate scientist
- William S. Hoar, zoologist and author, head of zoology department 1964–71
- C.S. Holling, ecologist and co-founder of adaptive management
- Nicole Horseherder, environmental activist
- Ethel Johns, established first university degree program in nursing in Canada
- Patrick J. Keeling, protistologist
- Gregor Kiczales, computer scientist, instructor of CPSC 110
- Maja Krzic, soil scientist
- Kathy Martin, professor of ornithology
- Pat McGeer, neuroscientist and politician
- Parisa Mehrkhodavandi, chemist
- Ivan R. Nabi, cell biologist
- Peter Oberlander, Canada's first professor of urban and regional planning; founder of UBC's School of Community and Regional Planning
- Sarah Otto, evolutionary geneticist and MacArthur Fellow
- Daniel Pauly, fisheries scientist
- Reva Potashin, psychologist
- Rosemary Redfield, microbiologist
- William Rees, planning professor and originator of the ecological footprint
- Martin Schechter, epidemiologist awarded Order of British Columbia
- Gordon Walter Semenoff, physicist, Majorana Prize (2006)
- Gordon Shrum, physicist, head of the Physics Department; Dean of Graduate Studies (1957 to 1961)
- Linda Siegel, cognitive psychologist; holder of the Dorothy C. Lam Chair in Special Education, 1996–2015
- David Suzuki, biologist and environmental activist
- Bill Unruh, physicist, discoverer of the Unruh effect
- Erich Vogt, physicist, founder of TRIUMF
- Rudolf Vrba, Holocaust survivor and pharmacologist

=== Sociology ===
- Neil Guppy, former head of department
- Giselle O. Martin-Kniep, educator specializing in learning communities

=== Visual arts ===
- Ken Lum, artist; represented Canada at the Sydney Biennale, the São Paulo Art Biennial, the Shanghai Biennale and at Documenta XI
- Art Spiegelman, comics artist and Pulitzer Prize winner
- Jeff Wall, photographer; Tate Gallery Retrospective; MOMA; Hasselblad Award; key figure in the photoconceptualist Vancouver School

== Recipients of honorary degrees ==
- Louise Arbour, justice
- Rosemary Brown, first black Canadian woman elected to a provincial legislature
- Emily Carr, artist
- Raffi Cavoukian, musician
- The 14th Dalai Lama
- Robertson Davies, author
- John Diefenbaker, 13th Prime Minister of Canada
- David A. Dodge, economist
- Tommy Douglas, former Premier of Saskatchewan
- Shirin Ebadi, lawyer and Nobel Peace Prize winner
- Atom Egoyan, filmmaker
- Lance Finch, Chief Justice of British Columbia
- Judith Forst, mezzo-soprano
- Michael J. Fox, actor
- Mike Harcourt, former Premier of British Columbia
- Ben Heppner, operatic tenor
- Clara Hughes, Olympic cyclist and speedskater
- Finn E. Kydland, economist
- Grace McCarthy, former premier of British Columbia
- Beverley McLachlin, first woman to be Chief Justice of Canada
- Lester B. Pearson, 14th Prime Minister of Canada and winner of the Nobel Peace Prize
- Oscar Peterson, jazz pianist
- Grand Chief Stewart Phillip, president of the Union of BC Indian Chiefs
- Bill Reid, artist
- Amartya Sen, Indian economist awarded the 1998 Nobel Prize in Economic Sciences
- Carol Shields, author
- Adlai Stevenson II, former United States Ambassador to the United Nations
- Pierre Trudeau, 15th Prime Minister of Canada
- John Turner, 17th Prime Minister of Canada
- Archbishop Desmond Tutu
- Peter Wall, real estate developer and philanthropist
- George Woodcock, anarchist philosopher and founding editor of Canadian Literature
- Muhammad Yunus, founder of the Grameen Bank and winner of the Nobel Peace Prize
- The Aga Khan IV

== See also ==
- List of chancellors of the University of British Columbia
- List of presidents of the University of British Columbia
