= Overwaitea =

Overwaitea may refer to:

- Overwaitea Foods, a regional supermarket chain located in British Columbia, Canada
- Overwaitea Food Group, parent company of Overwaitea Foods
