= Dauvergne =

Dauvergne is a surname. Notable people with the surname include:

- Antoine Dauvergne (1713–1797), French composer and violinist
- Catherine Dauvergne (born 1964), Canadian legal scholar
- Geoffroy Dauvergne (1922–1977), French painter
- Peter Dauvergne, Canadian political scientist
