= Geraldine Pratt =

Geraldine Pratt may refer to:

- Geraldine Pratt May, first director of the Women's Air Force
- Geraldine Pratt (geographer), Canadian geographer, researcher, and professor
