= Darren Dahl =

Canadian business economist

Darren Dahl is a Canadian business professor of marketing, currently the BC Innovation Council Professor and current dean and director of the Robert H. Lee Graduate School, Sauder School of Business, University of British Columbia (UBC), and also a published author. At UBC, he was formerly the Fred H. Siller Professor in Applied Market Research.
