= Overwaitea Foods =

Former Canadian supermarket chain in British Columbia

- Company type: Subsidiary
- Industry: Supermarket
- Founded: 1915; 111 years ago British Columbia
- Defunct: March 22, 2018; 8 years ago
- Fate: Remaining stores converted to Save-On-Foods
- Headquarters: Langley, British Columbia, Canada
- Key people: Jim Pattison
- Products: Western Family, Western Classics, Good and Kind, Value Priced
- Owner: Jim Pattison Group
- Parent: Overwaitea Food Group
- Website: www.overwaitea.com

Overwaitea Foods was a regional chain of supermarkets located in British Columbia, Canada.

On March 8, 1915, Robert C. Kidd purchased a store at 746 Columbia Street in New Westminster, British Columbia. He developed several innovative merchandising techniques to attract customers, including odd-penny pricing and selling 18 ounces of tea for the price of a pound. The store was soon known as the "over-weight tea" store. When Kidd opened his second store, he called it "Overwaitea".

In 1968, Jim Pattison purchased Overwaitea. As of January 2007, the chain operated 15 outlets throughout the province, primarily in the smaller towns of British Columbia, while a number of stores formerly operated under the Overwaitea brand have since been converted to that of its sister chain, Save-On-Foods. Their parent company, the Overwaitea Food Group, also owns Urban Fare, PriceSmart Foods and Cooper's Foods. All are owned by the Jim Pattison Group.

On March 22, 2018, the remaining two Overwaitea locations in British Columbia were closed, reopening the following day as Save-On-Foods stores.

== See also ==
- List of Canadian supermarkets
