= Station Square collapse =

Collapse of a Save-On-Foods supermarket in Burnaby, British Columbia, Canada

Coordinates: 49.2270°N 123.0037°W

The Station Square collapse, also known as the Save-On-Foods collapse and "Cave-On-Foods", was a major structural failure of a new supermarket and parking facility in Burnaby, British Columbia, Canada. On April 23, 1988, within minutes of the grand opening of a new Save-On-Foods store, a 6,400 square foot (590 m^{2}) portion of the roof collapsed, sending the rooftop parking deck and 20 automobiles crashing into the produce section below. There were no fatalities, and 21 people were treated in hospital. In the years following the collapse, recommendations from a commission of inquiry resulted in significant changes to the practice of architecture and engineering throughout British Columbia.

== Collapse ==
At 9:00 am on the morning of April 23, 1988, customers were let into the store as part of a grand opening sale for senior citizens. Within 10 minutes an employee noticed water spraying from an overhead pipe that had burst. It was buckling under pressure from a roof beam that was twisting out of shape above a steel column. The 4.5-minute-long structural failure was heard and witnessed by many of the store occupants, including several who took photographs of the twisting and crushed beam. Evacuation alerts were issued through the public address system, and the store was emptied in less than 5 minutes. The mayor of Burnaby, Bill Copeland, who presided over the opening ceremonies, assisted in directing the evacuation of approximately 600 customers and 307 employees.

Four structural bays of the roof, measuring 27 by 23 metres (89 by 75 ft), collapsed into the produce section. One store employee was trapped under the debris and was removed by first responders using forklifts; he suffered a crushed pelvis. Several people were blown off their feet by the rushing air from the collapse.

== Background and cause ==
The $100 million Station Square development project was begun in 1985 by Georgilas Investments. In 1986, Station Square/Wesbild purchased the as-yet unbuilt project.

The supermarket facility was a $5.4 million part of the newly constructed mixed-use Station Square, complex in the Metrotown area of Burnaby, a suburb of Vancouver. The facility was owned and developed by Wesbild Enterprises and Station Square Developments Inc.. Urban Design Group were the architects. Amako Construction Ltd. was the general contractor. Two structural engineering firms were involved: Tamm Tacy and Associates and MSS Group who were engaged during construction to provide additional structural verification. Save-On-Foods, then owned by the Overwaitea Foods division of Jim Pattison Industries (now Jim Pattison Group), was a tenant, not the owner or developer of the building.

Before construction started, one of the contractors bidding on the work proposed adding car parking onto the roof. The owner asked the architects and engineers to determine if this was feasible; they did and recommended changes to the design of the structure for additional support and to provide access by way of a moving walkway.

The structural failure was a direct result of the failure of the roof beam to support the weight of the rooftop parking structure and automobiles above. It was determined that the steel beam was undersized for its intended purpose and did not have bracing required to resist buckling above where it was supported on the column.

Several factors were determined by the Commissioner of Inquiry into the collapse to have contributed to the collapse. These included, in part or in combination, errors on the part of the engineers, contractors, and steel supplier/mill. It has also been argued that then-industry standard procedures in engaging and valuation of engineering services and certification of contractors' work were also contributing factors.

=== Beam size ===
During the design phase, the thickness of the roof beam that failed was reduced by 27% to a size incapable of supporting the loads above, even with lateral bracing. The reasons for this change have not been determined. "The beam was greatly under designed. The beam column assembly lacked essential lateral supports. Failure was inevitable. If not under April 23 loads, then under full service loads."

In November 1987, during construction, a beam in the area of the moving walkway deflected and caused the residential structure above to tilt approximately 2 inches (51 mm) from vertical. The structural engineers reviewed the design in this area and recommended additional columns, stronger beams, and concrete reinforcing be added. This was done. In December 1987, Wesbild/Station Square hired the MSS Group to conduct a review of the engineering design in this area. They made recommendations, including remedial work to beams with insufficient capacity, to which Tamm Tacy concurred. Both firms later certified that this remedial work has been completed by the contractor.

In March 1988, the MSS Group was hired by the tenant, Save-On-Foods, to conduct a structural review of the entire project due to concerns about deflections of roof beams above the store. MSS found two beams to have "insufficient capacity" and made recommendations for correction. Both engineering firms, the architects, developer, and contractor took steps to initiate this action. The following day Tamm Tacy advised that this remedial work would not be necessary due to the steel mill who had fabricated the beam providing documentation indicating the actual capacity of the beam was significantly greater than in documentation used during design. MSS Group advised that the beam was therefore "satisfactory to resist the design loadings imposed" and "this information is a blessing for all concerned".

Two types of failure occurred: beam bending with buckling of the lower beam flange and buckling of the beam-column assembly. The first was determined to be the most probable prime failure and the second the less probable prime cause.

The beam that failed was a 24-inch-deep (610 mm) wide-flange steel beam. Failure occurred at the point where it was supported on top of a steel column. One end of the beam was continuously supported (on other columns) and the other end was cantilevered (not supported on other columns). With the weight of the cars parking on the roof, the beam began to buckle and was photographed to have rotated approximately 90 degrees from the vertical to the horizontal position above the supporting column. For an estimated 4 1/2 minutes, the roof deck and supporting joists sagged and functioned as a form of suspension bridge.

=== Concrete topping ===
The concrete topping on the roof deck was increased from 2 inches (51 mm) to 3 inches (76 mm) thickness. The design of the supporting roof joists was increased to account for this increased dead load, but the beam was not.

=== Rooftop sidewalk ===
The width of the rooftop sidewalk was increased from 5 feet (1.5 m) to 11 feet (3.4 m). The engineer's design called for this to be concrete over styrofoam; the contractor built the extra width of solid concrete. This increase in dead load was not known to the architects and engineers at the time and so no change to supporting structure was investigated.

=== Steel strength ===
The MSS Group recommended strengthening the beam above the column by adding a beam bracket with web stiffeners. This change was not implemented when Tamm Tacy advised that mill certificates obtained from the steel sub-contractor indicated it to be 25% higher strength than expected. It was later determined that this type of data is not a truly representative sampling of the steel as fabricated and so is not a valid measure of actual strength.

=== Lateral bracing ===
Lateral bracing can increase the capacity of beams. It can be provided by roof joists or beam web stiffeners. The engineering drawings did not indicate lateral bracing be provided at the column where the collapse occurred. The engineers did not study the reduced capacity of the beam due to lack of lateral support.

=== Scope of work ===
There was a misunderstanding of who was to determine the need for lateral bracing. The steel subcontractor stated they did not provide web stiffeners to the beam as they weren't indicated on the engineering drawings. Tamm Tacy stated they believed the decision to provide the stiffeners resided with the steel subcontractor's detailer.

=== Live load miscalculation ===
Engineers at the MSS Group made incorrect assumptions about the live loads on the roof deck in checking the design.

=== Industry practices ===
The Commissioner of Inquiry noted three common practices of the development and construction industry were cause for concern: fast-tracking, bidding for professional services, and fragmentation of contractual responsibility.

The Fast-track construction process obtaining permits and commencing construction on a portion of the project before the design is fully completed. This process, where "time is money", can involve significant design changes being made during construction. This can create confusion and delay and significantly increase opportunities for error.

The primary structural engineering firm for Station Square project, Tamm Tacy and Associates, was one of several firms who submitted fee proposals to the developer for services. The Commissioner's report stated that, based on the fees, all of the firms "did not intend to provide" the proper level of professional service Their fee of $17,000 on a $5.4 million total construction cost was a significantly lower percentage than recommended by the Association of Professional Engineers and Geoscientists of British Columbia tariff of fees.

The Commissioner's report recommended that the APEGBC be permitted to establish and enforce a minimum tariff of fees.

== Aftermath ==
The provincial government convened a Commissioner Inquiry on May 4, 1988, to report on the causes of the failure. It was headed by Dan J. Closkey, with Richard S. Campbell serving as commission legal counsel, and delivered its report on August 26 1988. The event also became known as "Cave-On-Foods" in the media and popular culture.

Key findings of the Commissioner of Inquiry's report are listed in the Background and cause section above. Major recommendations included:

=== Structural reviews ===
It was noted that contrary to the perception of the general public, engineering design, verification, and monitoring of construction lies with professional engineers hired for the project, not the building inspectors. The report recommended that the BC Building Code and Engineers Act be amended to require that structural calculations and drawings be submitted when applying for a building permit; detailed review should be conducted on a random sampling; where warranted the designs should be submitted for detailed review to the professional engineers' governing body; and review costs should be born by municipal levies on building permits.

=== Professional letters of assurance ===
The building code should include province-wide, standard Letters of Assurance, documents that the registered professionals (architects and engineers) responsible for the design would certify that the design conforms to the building codes, will be retained for construction review and, at the end of construction, to certify that the construction conforms with the approved construction documents and codes. This recommendation was implemented in the 1992 edition of the British Columbia Building Code.

=== Professional negligence ===
In 1989 the four engineers from the two engineering firms (Tammy Tacy and Associates, MSS Engineering (Structural) Ltd.) involved in the collapse were found guilty of incompetence, negligence or professional misconduct by a five-member panel of the professional engineers governing body. The panel noted inadequate design of the roof structure, including the support beams, failure to inspect the construction of the roof's assembly, and failure to direct or check the work on the project of the engineer in training who was directly managing the project. The panel also found that the engineers’ code of ethics had been breached by one of the firm's partners signing and applying his professional seal to plans and specifications that he had not prepared or supervised. Also faulted were the engineers for inadequately reviewing the structure before the collapse, including not noticing that lateral supports were missing.

Between 1991 and 1994, the APEGBC also made recommendations and took actions in their professional governance geared towards preventing reoccurrence of the actions that led to the collapse. The Canadian Institute of Steel Construction took action to implement recommendations of the inquiry's report.

=== Lawsuits ===
There were several lawsuits resulting from the collapse. These included litigation by the developers against the general contractor, architects, and structural engineers; by the developers against the consultants' insurance companies; and by owners of the automobiles destroyed in the collapse against the developer, contractor, architects, engineers, and the supermarket.

=== Re-opening ===
The Save-On-Foods and rooftop parking structure was repaired, and the store operated until 2012. The complex was demolished in 2013 as part of a new development with a 35-storey tower comprising condominium units, offices, and ground floor retail. The store reopened in a new space approximately half its previous size in late 2015 in this development.
