= Save-On-Foods =

Western Canadian supermarket chain

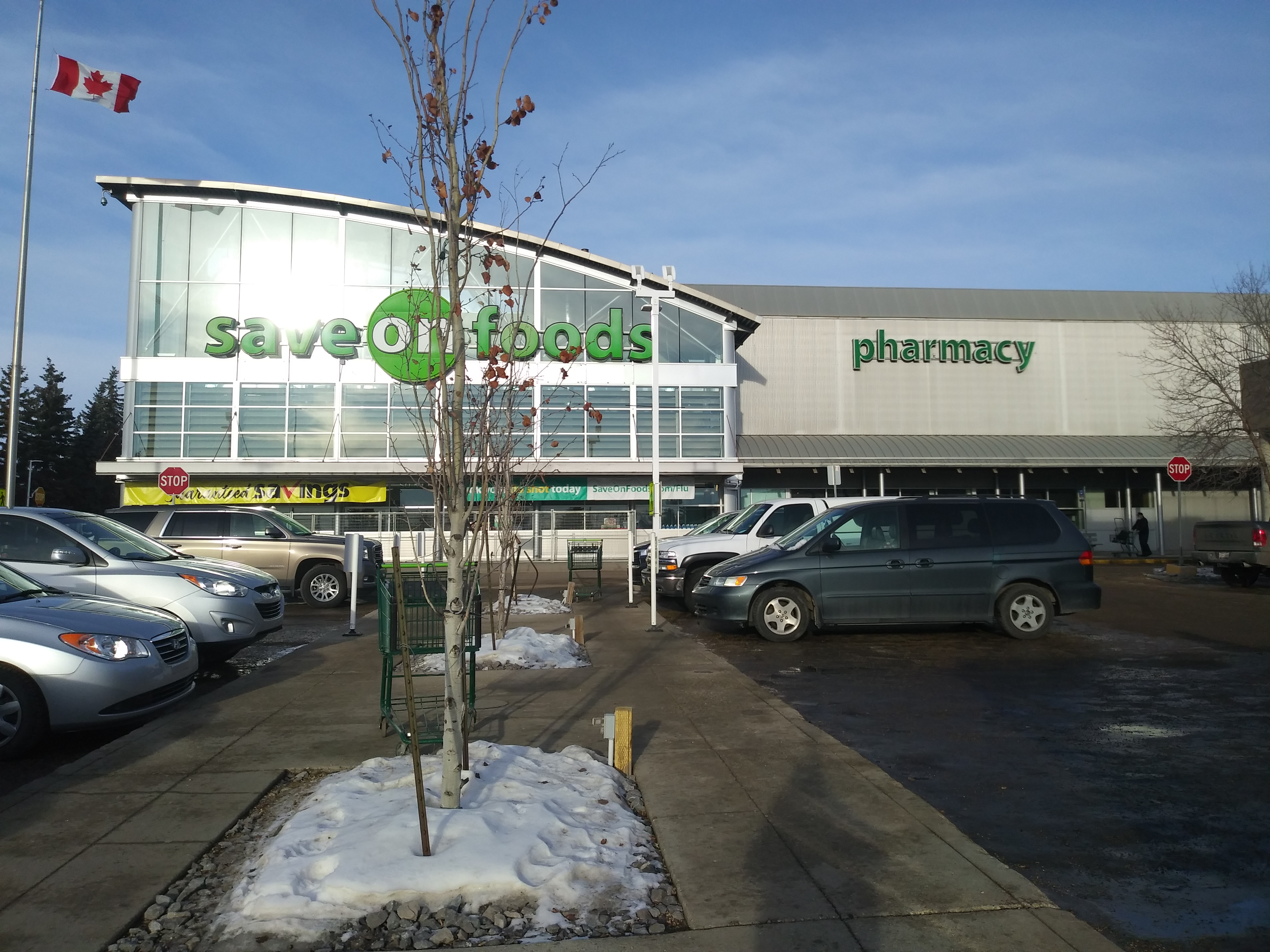
- Type: Subsidiary
- Industry: Supermarket
- Founded: 1982; 44 years ago British Columbia
- Headquarters: Langley Township, British Columbia, Canada
- Number of locations: 187 Stores
- Key people: Jim Pattison
- Products: Grocery, General Merchandise, Pharmacy, Personal Care, Wine (Select Stores)
- Brands: Western Family; Only Goodness
- Revenue: $1 billion
- Number of employees: 21,842 (2021)
- Parent: Pattison Food Group
- Website: www.saveonfoods.com

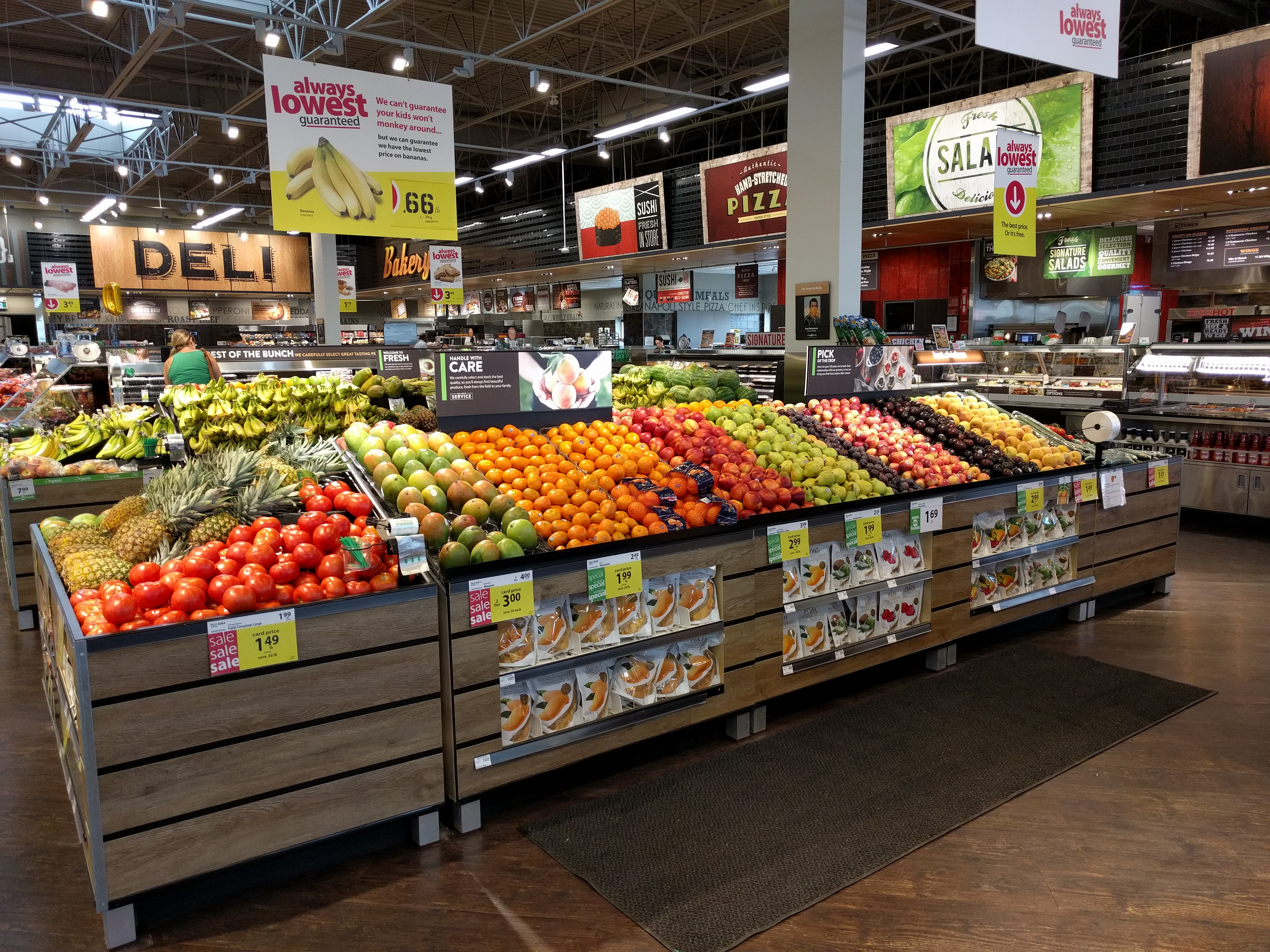

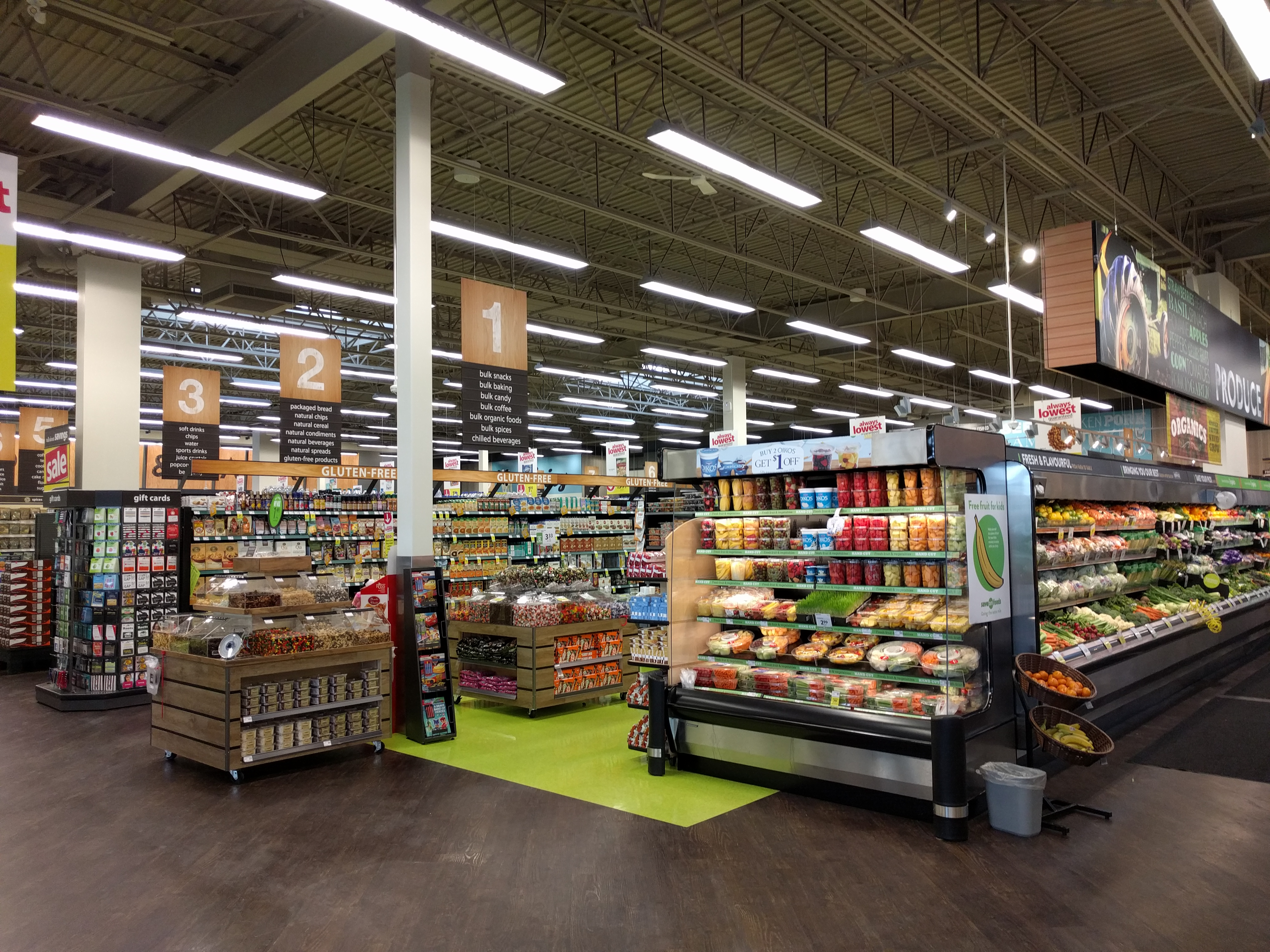

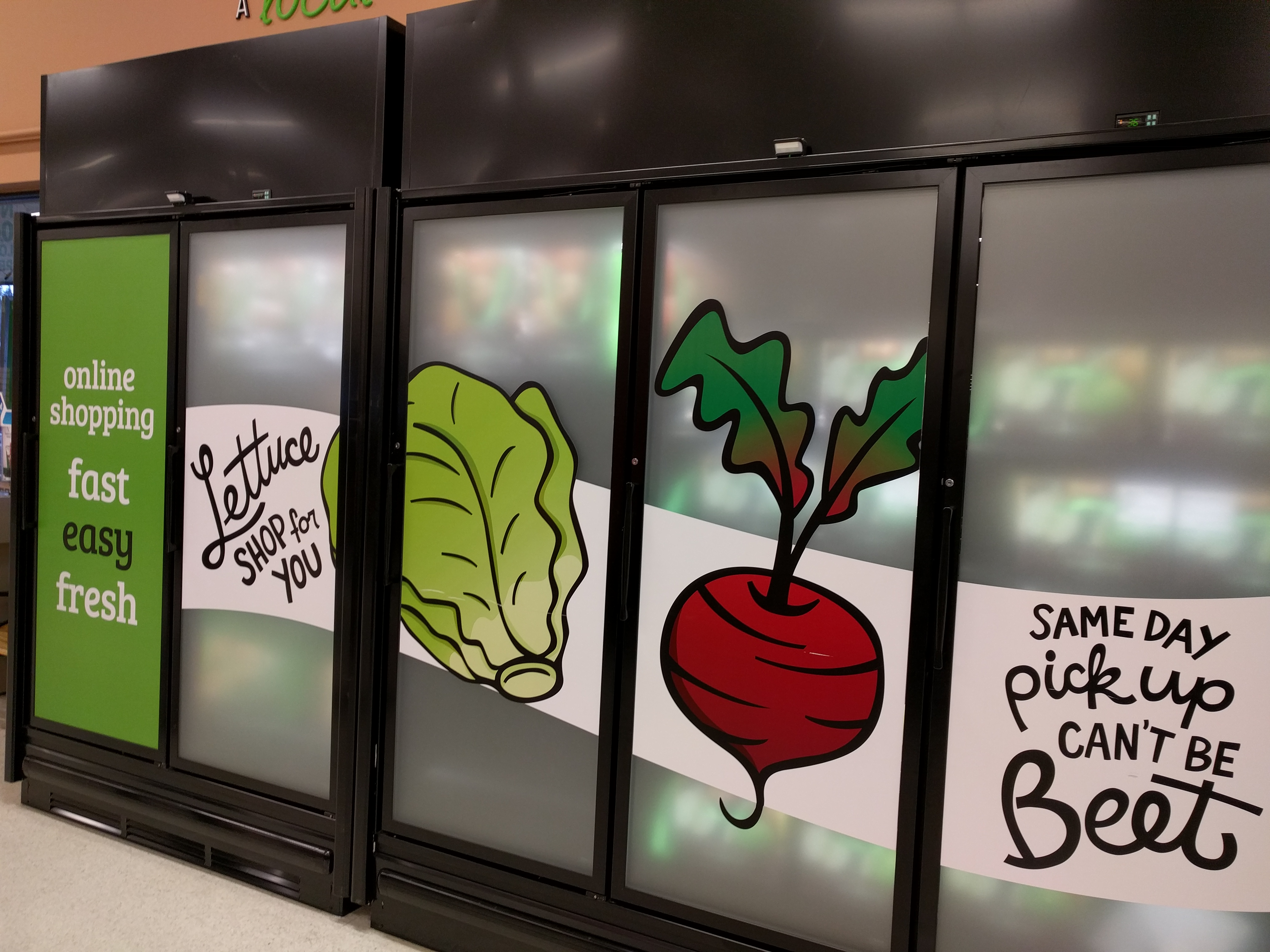
Online shopping order pick-up fridges at a Save-On-Foods store.

Save-On-Foods is a chain of supermarkets located across Western Canada, owned by the Pattison Food Group.

Stores carry both standard brands and private label brands, such as Western Family and Only Goodness. Many stores have a pharmacy, and some locations provide other services, including nutrition tours and health clinics, as well as other features such as Starbucks Coffee (all former Safeway locations) or Tim Hortons (some former Sobeys locations) kiosks, juice bars, and departments featuring BC wines. Today, Save-On-Foods operates 180 stores across British Columbia, Alberta, Saskatchewan, Manitoba and the Yukon Territory.

== History ==
The Save-On-Foods brand was launched in British Columbia in 1982 by Overwaitea Foods, which had been founded in 1915 and was later purchased by Jimmy Pattison in 1968. Most Overwaitea branded stores were gradually converted to Save-On-Foods stores beginning in the 1980s, with the last two remaining Overwaitea stores switching in 2018.

The first Save-On-Foods store in Alberta opened in 1990 in Edmonton. The store's loyalty card was launched in May 1992 as the Save-On-More card, but later rebranded as More Rewards.

Save-On-Foods is also the namesake company of the Save-On-Foods Memorial Centre Arena in Victoria, British Columbia. In 2004, the Jim Pattison Group agreed to pay $125,000 per year for 10 years for the Save-On-Foods name rights on Victoria’s new arena, amidst unpopular public opinion.

In February 2014, the company announced it was taking over 14 stores on Vancouver Island owned by Sobeys, mostly under the Safeway and Thrifty Foods banners. It was also announced that Overwaitea would convert 11 of its PriceSmart Foods locations to the Save-On-Foods brand.

Until 2015, Save-On-Foods operated exclusively in the provinces of British Columbia and Alberta. In July 2015, the company revealed it was planning to open as many as 40 stores in Manitoba and Saskatchewan over the following three to five years, the first of which was scheduled to open in 2016, including three locations in Winnipeg and four in Saskatchewan.

In March 2016, it was announced that Save-On-Foods would also expand to northern Canada opening up a store in Whitehorse, Yukon in 2017.

In 2017, Save-On-Foods began carrying private label products from UK grocery chain Tesco. This arrangement ended in early 2019.

In January 2026, the Green Party of British Columbia called for a boycott of Save-On Foods due to the Jim Pattison Group's plans to sell a warehouse it owned in Hanover County, Virginia, to the United States Department of Homeland Security for use by its ICE division, which had faced mass protests and had been involved in scandals that month relating to the killings of Renée Good and Alex Pretti. On January 30, the boycott was called off due to the sale being cancelled.

== Locations ==
=== Alberta ===
50 locations:

- Airdrie (2)
- Athabasca
- Blackfalds
- Calgary (9)
- Camrose
- Canmore
- Cochrane
- Didsbury
- Edmonton (15)
- Fort McMurray (3)
- Grande Prairie
- Langdon
- Lethbridge (2)
- Medicine Hat
- Okotoks
- Red Deer (2)
- Sherwood Park (3)
- St. Albert (2)
- Spruce Grove

=== British Columbia ===
122 locations:

- 100 Mile House
- Abbotsford (3)
- Aldergrove
- Burnaby (5)
- Burns Lake
- Campbell River
- Chilliwack (4)
- Clearwater, British Columbia
- Coquitlam (2)
- Cranbrook
- Creston
- Dawson Creek
- Delta (3)
- Duncan
- Fernie
- Fort St. James
- Fort St. John
- Fort Nelson
- Golden
- Grand Forks
- Hope
- Kamloops (5)
- Kelowna (5)
- Kimberley
- Kitimat
- Ladysmith
- Langford
- Langley (3)
- Maple Ridge (3)
- Merritt
- Mission
- Nakusp
- Nanaimo (3)
- Nelson
- New Westminster (3)
- North Vancouver (city)/(district) (4)
- Osoyoos
- Parksville
- Penticton
- Pitt Meadows
- Port Alberni
- Port Coquitlam (2)
- Port Hardy
- Port Moody
- Powell River
- Prince George (4)
- Prince Rupert
- Princeton
- Quesnel
- Revelstoke
- Richmond (4)
- Saanich
- Salmon Arm
- Sidney
- Sparwood
- Squamish
- Surrey (8)
- Terrace
- Vancouver (9)
- Vernon (2)
- Victoria (4)
- West Kelowna
- Williams Lake
- Winfield

=== Manitoba ===
5 locations:

- Winnipeg (5)

=== Saskatchewan ===
10 locations:

- Prince Albert
- Regina (2)
- Saskatoon (3)
- Yorkton

=== Yukon ===
1 location:

- Whitehorse

== See also ==
- List of supermarket chains in Canada
- Station Square collapse
- Urban Fare
