= Urban Fare =

Supermarket chain in British Columbia, Canada

- Type: Subsidiary
- Industry: Supermarket
- Founded: 1999; 27 years ago, in British Columbia
- Headquarters: Vancouver, British Columbia, Canada
- Number of locations: 5
- Key people: Jim Pattison
- Parent: Overwaitea Food Group
- Website: www.urbanfare.com

Urban Fare is a supermarket chain located in British Columbia. It is a subsidiary of the Overwaitea Food Group, which, in turn, is owned by the Vancouver-based Jim Pattison Group. The chain has five locations, three located in downtown Vancouver, one at the UBC Point Grey campus, and one in Kelowna. It is part of the 'More Rewards' rewards card program as also featured at other stores in the chain such as Save-On-Foods.

Urban Fare is primarily upmarket, with a focus on high-end, gourmet, organic and imported foods. In addition to selling food, most locations also have an in-store restaurant and coffee bar. Most of the stores also feature a florist, pharmacy and wide selection of prepackaged "grab and go" meals.

== History ==
The first Urban Fare opened in 1999 in Vancouver's trendy Yaletown neighbourhood, at the base of a new luxury condominium development. An Edmonton, Alberta store in the city's historic Crestwood neighbourhood opened shortly after but closed after its lease expired. A second Vancouver location in the Coal Harbour neighbourhood opened in 2007, and a third opened in 2008 in the Living Shangri-La tower in downtown Vancouver. In 2012 the chain added a new location in Vancouver's Olympic Village complex, billed as an "Express Urban Fare", being half the size of most other locations. A fifth location, the first outside Vancouver, was opened in a converted Cooper's Foods store in Kelowna also in 2012. A sixth location was opened in uptown Calgary in 2019.

Early in its history, the store made news for the price and luxury of some of its goods, notably an imported loaf of Poilâne bread which it sold for $100.

In 2025, the location in Olympic Village re-branded to a Save-On-Foods leaving the chain with two Vancouver locations.

== Locations ==
4 locations:

- Kelowna
- UBC Point Grey Campus
- Vancouver (2)

== See also ==
- List of supermarket chains in Canada
