= David F. Hardwick =

Canadian pathologist

Professor David F. Hardwick FRCPC
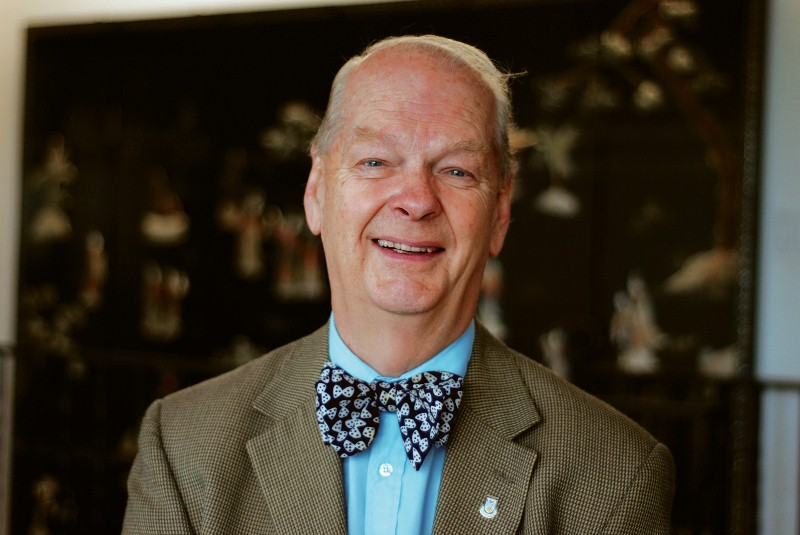
- Born: January 24, 1934
- Died: May 15, 2021 (aged 87)
- Occupation: Researcher

David Francis Hardwick (January 24, 1934 – May 15, 2021) was a Canadian researcher specializing in pediatric pathology. He was associated with the University of British Columbia (UBC) for over six decades, beginning as a student and later holding roles as professor and Professor Emeritus. In 1984, Hardwick established the Medical Student Alumni Center (MSAC) at UBC, an initiative aimed at connecting medical alumni.

== Early years and education ==
Hardwick was born in Vancouver, British Columbia, in 1934. He graduated from the University of British Columbia in 1957, where he completed his undergraduate and medical education. Hardwick pursued postgraduate education in Montreal, Charlotte, Vancouver, and Los Angeles. His studies focused on pediatrics, followed by pathology, medical biochemistry, and developmental physiology.

== Research ==
In 1963, he began his teaching, research, and administrative career at the University of British Columbia in the Department of Pathology. Hardwick was awarded an Honorary Doctor of Laws degree by the University of British Columbia in 2001. He served as the Associate Dean of Research and Planning in the UBC Faculty of Medicine from 1990 to 1996.

== Education for others ==
Hardwick's research included the first documented description of the histopathologic implications of differential survival of Wilms' tumors in relation to the pathogenesis of L-methionine toxicity. His work in pediatric pathology also included studies on childhood metabolic disorders. Later, his research interests extended to the economic effects of clinical laboratory testing.

== Education for others ==
Hardwick was elected Faculty Advisor to the Medical Advisory Undergraduate Society, serving for over 20 consecutive two-year terms. Upon retirement, he was invited to remain as Special Advisor for Planning.

In 2002, Hardwick collaborated with the Executive Council of British Columbia's Ministries of Health Services and Advanced Education to establish academic facilities at hospitals and clinics across the province. This initiative was part of a provincial effort to increase undergraduate student enrollment from 128 to 288 annually while also modestly expanding postgraduate residency opportunities for trainees.

Hardwick served as Secretary of the International Academy of Pathology (IAP) and co-founded a book series on classical liberalism.

== Distinguished Awards and Major Involvements ==
2004: Gold Medal of the IAP and the USCAP's Presidential Award.

1994: The UBC Teaching Excellence Award and Prize.

1986: The University of British Columbia's first Faculty Citation Award related to the creation of BC's Children's Hospital.

1974: The Master Teacher Award.

Dr. Hardwick worked with Dr. H.K. Ng to bring IAP and Pathology to mainland China.

Hardwick was a consultant to UAP and USCAP, and also served as USCAP's Chair of Long-Term Strategic Planning. He also served as IAP President (1992-1994), Chair of the Inter-Congress Education Committee (1994-1998), and Secretary (2006-2015).
