= Rape chant =

Chant made by members of a group that condones rape and sexual assault

A rape chant is a type of chant made by members of a group that condones rape and sexual assault. Incidents have consisted of chanted or sung lyrics that disregard sexual consent and are condemned as normalizing rape culture.

== History ==
Historically rape chants have been associated with the acceptance of violence against women. Rape chants relate to a sociological concept called rape culture. In the past chants have invoked violence against women, violence against children, paedophilia, political violence and even necrophilia.

Carleton University associate professor Rena Bivens stated that these chants normalize rape culture and that both men and women can be complicit. Roxanne Harde of the University of Alberta also contends that "sexist attitudes can become embedded in individual thinking so that chanting about rape can become normalized". The topic was explored at length in a The Agenda with Steve Paikin segment in 2013.

== Notable examples ==
=== Africa ===
Over 100 members of the youth wing of the ruling political party engaged in rape chants in Burundi in 2017. These chants were subsequently condemned by the United Nations.

=== Americas ===
In 2013 chants occurred at two Canadian universities. These incidents garnered significant media coverage in Canada. The first incident occurred on Labour Day when a group of Saint Mary's University students sung lyrics "condoning non-consensual sex with underage girls" during frosh-week. That same September, another incident occurred involving students from the University of British Columbia's prestigious Sauder School of Business. Students from the Commerce Undergraduate Society were recorded participating in these chants. Reforms were made following incidents at UBC and an investigation revealed that such chants were part of an "oral tradition" possibly dating back at least 20 years.

In 2010, Delta Kappa Epsilon, a prominent fraternity at Yale University, was implicated in an incident where members chanted "no means yes, yes means anal." The fraternity was suspended for five years following the chant in 2011.

=== Australia ===
A rape chant incident occurred on the University of New South Wales' campus in 2016. The same chant was repeated by students of Melbourne's St. Kevin's College in 2019, resulting in widespread condemnation.

=== Europe ===
In 2017 Jesus College, Cambridge, England disciplined students for allegedly shouting "woman-hating, rape-inciting chants". In 2022, a chant occurred at Complutense University, Madrid, Spain. The chants were criticised by Spanish Prime Minister Pedro Sánchez.

== See also ==
- Campus sexual assault
