= William Sauder =

William L. Sauder, OC, OBC (May 27, 1926 – December 19, 2007) was a Canadian businessman and philanthropist. He was formerly the chairman of Sauder Industries Ltd. and International Forest Products Limited.

Sauder graduated from the University of British Columbia, where he was a member of the Phi Delta Theta fraternity, in 1948 with a Bachelor of Commerce degree, and later returned to the university as a member of the Board of Governors. He was ultimately appointed chair of the board, and was later elected Chancellor, a position he held from 1996 to 2002. He was awarded an honorary Doctor of Laws degree by UBC in 1990.

On June 5, 2003, Sauder donated a $20 million endowment and the University of British Columbia's Faculty of Commerce and Business Administration which was subsequently renamed the Sauder School of Business. His gift of $20 million was the largest single private donation ever made to a Canadian business school at the time.

In 2004, he was awarded the Order of British Columbia. William Sauder died after a brief illness on December 19, 2007.

Academic offices
Preceded by Robert H. Lee	Chancellor of the University of British Columbia; 1996–2002	Succeeded by Allan McEachern
