= PriceSmart Foods =

Canadian supermarket chain in British Columbia

- Logo since 2023
- Company type: Subsidiary
- Industry: Supermarket
- Number of locations: 5 Stores
- Key people: Jim Pattison
- Brands: Western Family, Value Priced
- Parent: Overwaitea Food Group
- Website: www.pricesmartfoods.ca

PriceSmart Foods is a chain of Asian supermarkets located in British Columbia, Canada. It is a wholly owned subsidiary of the Overwaitea Food Group, which is owned by the Jim Pattison Group. PriceSmart shares the same brands and rewards card system as other Overwaitea chains, including Save-On-Foods.

In 2014, all but two PriceSmart Foods locations were converted into Save-On-Foods stores. The remaining locations have adjusted their focus into specializing as Asian-foods supermarkets. In the mid-2020s the chain began expanding again with a third location in Burnaby in 2024 and locations in Vancouver and Burnaby in 2025.

== Locations ==
5 locations:

- Vancouver
- Burnaby (Station Square)
- Burnaby (Lougheed)
- Burnaby (Edmonds)
- Richmond

== See also ==
- List of Canadian supermarkets
