= Florence McNeil =

Canadian poet, writer, playwright, and professor (died 2013)

- Born: Florence Ann McNeil c. 1932
- Died: August 26, 2013; Delta, British Columbia, Canada
- Occupations: Poet, writer, playwright, and professor

Florence Ann McNeal (née McNeil, c. 1932 – August 26, 2013) was a Canadian poet, writer, playwright, and professor.

== Personal life ==
Florence Ann McNeil was born in Vancouver, British Columbia around 1932 to John Peter McNeil and Jean (Gillies) McNeil, both of whom were of Scottish ancestry. Jean was the daughter of John Gillies, who was part of the "Barra Group" that immigrated to Canada from Scotland in 1924. When she married David McNeal, she kept Florence McNeil as her nom-de-plume.

McNeil graduated from the University of British Columbia in 1953 with an undergraduate degree in Arts, a Teacher Training Diploma in 1955, and an MA in Creative Writing, while being mentored by poet and UBC professor Earle Birney in 1965. Birney said she was "one of the best writers of poetry with a western base." Her thesis was a compilation of original poems entitled Interior August.

McNeil died in Delta, British Columbia on August 26, 2013.

=== University life ===
In 1951, while studying for her BA at UBC, she began writing for The Ubyssey. From the fall of 1951 to early spring 1953 she was the women's editor of the paper. McNeil was praised in Harry Logan's "Tuum Est," a history of the University of British Columbia, in 1957 for her high level of reporting and editorial writing as a result of her column "Scotch and Soda." However, she faced criticism during the winter of 1953 for her apparent defense of Archbishop Aloysius Stepinac in a poem published January 30, 1953 in "Scotch and Soda."

In 1953, she was elected by the graduating class to be the class poet. She was also sponsored by the Ubyssey to be a Homecoming Queen candidate. She was also treasurer of the Women's Undergraduate Society. And was an active member of UBC's Newman Club chapter.

== Professional career ==
- Instructor in English, Western Washington State College (now University), Bellingham, 1965–68.
- Assistant professor, University of Calgary, Alberta, 1968–73.
- Assistant professor The University of British Columbia, 1973–76
- Full-time writer beginning 1976

=== Creative work ===
It is said that her work is influenced by her Scottish ancestry and that her work provides evidence of her "interest in narrative and how the past impinges on the present." Her poems "take the form of linked sequences, typically grounded in a historical person, tribe, place, or event." Additional influences included her childhood and nature and her interest in the historical narrative was evident in her early career. For example, one of her first books was Overlanders, in which she described the community and inhabitants through the voices of the inhabitants. Later, she attempted to publish an historical non-fiction volume on a real ghost town named Barkerville that suffered a devastating fire on September 16, 1868. However, she discovered that the story of Barkerville was more impactful in poetic form than non-fiction, so she continued the same style as that in Overlanders. Subsequent to her initial poetry about the Overlanders and Barkerville, she continued writing similar poetry for other real places and people, as well as fictitious people and places. Her book Emily followed the pattern of poetry about a real person, Emily Carr in this case, in fictitious form.

Some of her poems were later adapted to stage, radio, and TV productions, including "John Drainie's CBC radio program, Canadian Short Stories." For example, Barkerville was adapted to both theatre and radio. The stage production of Barkerville premiered in 1987. Her Miss P. and Me TV adaptation was first broadcast as early as 1988.

McNeil's records, both personal and professional, including unpublished manuscripts, are located in the University of British Columbia Archives.

== Selected awards ==
- Sheila A. Egoff Prize for children's literature in 1989
- Macmillan of Canada prize, 1965
- Canada Council award, 1976, 1978, 1980, 1982
- Canadian National Magazine award, 1979

== Selected works ==
Unless otherwise noted, the following list was found on encyclopedia.com.

=== Poetry ===
- Interior August, Vancouver, 1965.
- A Silent Green Sky. Vancouver, Klanak Press, 1967.
- Walhachin. Fredericton, New Brunswick, Fiddlehead, 1972.
- The Rim of the Park. Port Clements, British Columbia, Sono Nis Press, 1972.
- Emily. Toronto, Clarke Irwin, 1975.
- Ghost Towns. Toronto, McClelland and Stewart, 1975.
- A Balancing Act. Toronto, McClelland and Stewart, 1979.
- The Overlanders. Saskatoon, Saskatchewan, Thistledown Press, 1982.
- Barkerville. Saskatoon, Saskatchewan, Thistledown Press, 1984.
- Swimming out of History: Poems Selected and New. Parksville, British Columbia, Oolichan Press, 1991.
- A Company of Angels. Victoria, British Columbia, Ekstasis Editions, 1999.
- In the Slow Twilight of the Standing Stones: The Barra Poems. Victoria, Ekstasis Editions, 2001.

=== Novel ===
- Breathing Each Other's Air. Vancouver, Polestar Press, 1994.

=== Plays ===
- Barkerville (produced Vancouver, 1987).
- Radio Play: Barkerville: A Play for Voices, 1980.

=== Other ===
- When Is a Poem: Creative Ideas for Teaching Poetry Collected from Canadian Poets. Toronto, League of Canadian Poets, 1980.
- Miss P and Me (for children). Toronto, Clarke Irwin, 1982; New York, Harper, 1984.
- All Kinds of Magic (for children). Vancouver, Douglas and Mclntyre, 1984.
- Catriona's Island (for children). Vancouver, Douglas and McIntyre, 1988.
- Editor, Here Is a Poem. Toronto, League of Canadian Poets, 1983.
- Editor, Do the Whales Jump at Night: An Anthology of Canadian Poetry for Children. Vancouver, Douglas and McIntyre, 1990.
- Critical Studies: In Canadian Literature (Vancouver), autumn 1977; CV 2 (Winnipeg), 4, spring 1979, and autumn 1982.
