= Catharine Winstanley =

Canadian behavioural neuroscientist

- Born: United Kingdom

Academic background
- Education: BA, University of Oxford; PhD, 2004, University of Cambridge
- Thesis: The neural and neurochemical basis of impulsive behaviour. (2004)
- Doctoral advisor: Trevor Robbins
- Website: winstanleylab.psych.ubc.ca

Catharine Antonia Winstanley is a Canadian behavioural neuroscientist. She is a Full professor in the Department of Psychology and the Djavad Mowafaghian Centre for Brain Health at the University of British Columbia. In this role, she co-created the world’s first rat casino in an animal lab experiment to model human gambling. In 2020, Winstanley was elected to the Royal Society of Canada's College of New Scholars, Artists and Scientists.

== Early life and education ==
Winstanley was born and raised in the United Kingdom, where she attended the University of Oxford for her psychology and physiology degree. She later earned her PhD from the University of Cambridge under the guidance of Trevor Robbins, whom she lists as a major influence.

== Career ==
Upon completing her PhD, Winstanley worked under Eric J. Nestler at the University of Texas Southwestern Medical Center as a post-doctoral researcher. In January 2007, Winstanley accepted a tenure-track assistant professorship position at the University of British Columbia, where she subsequently established the Laboratory of Molecular and Behavioural Neuroscience. In 2009, Winstanley and graduate student Fiona Zeeb co-created the world’s first rat casino in an animal lab experiment to model human gambling. They allowed rats to choose between four gambling options which rewarded them with sugar pellets if they won the gamble and a timeout period if they lost. She also injected rats with a drug which reduced their levels of serotonin levels and another which reduced dopamine levels to see how it affected their gambling ability. The results were consistent with those of human clinical findings.

In March 2012, Winstanley published an article in the journal Neuropsychopharmacology which found that stimulates such as caffeine and amphetamines, could de-motivate workers and causes those with higher motivation levels to slack off. She later collaborated with Paul Cocker and Bernard Le Foll on a study titled A Selective Role for Dopamine D4 Receptors in Modulating Reward Expectancy in a Rodent Slot Machine Task, which re-used the rat casino to reduce behaviours associated with problem gambling in rats. It was the first study to show that gambling could be treated with drugs that block dopamine D4 receptors. In recognition of her efforts in the "field of research for gambling disorder and responsible gaming," she was the recipient of the 2014 Scientific Achievement Award from the International Center for Responsible Gaming. She also received a 2014/15 UBC Killam Research Prize, an institutional prize "recognizing outstanding research and scholarly contributions at UBC."

Winstanley continued her studies into gambling addiction in rats and in 2016, found that flashing lights and music could turn rats into problem gamblers. She also conducted research which suggested that blinking lights and loud sounds in casinos could encourage risky decision-making and potentially promote problem gambling behaviour. In the same year, she received a Project Grant from the Canadian Institutes of Health Research to fund her research project "Neuroinflammation at the nexus of stimulant addiction, impulsivity and traumatic brain injury." In 2020, Winstanley was elected to the Royal Society of Canada's College of New Scholars, Artists and Scientists.

== Selected publications ==
The following is a list of selected publications:

- Behavioral models of impulsivity in relation to ADHD: translation between clinical and preclinical studies (2006)
- Contrasting roles of basolateral amygdala and orbitofrontal cortex in impulsive choice (2004)
