= Ivan R. Nabi =

Canadian cell biologist

Ivan Robert Nabi is a Canadian cell biologist and academic. He serves as professor and director of Imaging at the Life Sciences Institute of the University of British Columbia in Vancouver, Canada. His research focuses on cellular domains and their roles in cancer progression and metastasis.

== Education ==
Nabi earned his Bachelor of Science degree in Biochemistry from McGill University, Montreal, Quebec, in 1983. He completed his Ph.D. in Cancer Metastasis at the Weizmann Institute of Science in 1989.

== Career ==
Nabi pursued postdoctoral fellowships at the Michigan Cancer Foundation and Cornell University Medical College. His academic career includes positions at the Université de Montréal, where he served as Assistant, Associate and then Full Professor in the Departments of Pathology and Cell Biology and Anatomy from 1992 to 2005.

In 2004, he joined the University of British Columbia as a professor in the Department of Cellular and Physiological Sciences at the Life Sciences Institute.

== Research contributions ==
Nabi's research spans a range of topics in cell biology with application to cancer metastasis and viral infections such as Zika and SARS-CoV-2. His early work identified the Gp78 receptor of Autocrine motility factor during his graduate studies, later identified as an endoplasmic reticulum-associated E3 ubiquitin ligase. His recent work has identified a role for Gp78 in regulation of basal mitophagy, production of reactive oxygen species and a distinct class of ribosome-studded mitochondria-endoplasmic reticulum contacts (riboMERCs). He has studied cellular domains including Lipid raft, caveolae, non-caveolar caveolin-1 scaffolds, and the galectin lattice, elucidating their regulation of cancer cell signaling and migration. His recent focus involves applying weakly supervised computational machine learning approaches to super-resolution microscopy for biological discovery, applying network analysis to single molecule microscopy to identify non-caveolar scaffolds and developing sub-pixel super-resolution approaches to detect mitochondria-endoplasmic reticulum contact sites.

== Awards and service ==
Nabi is currently the Associate Editor for Biochemistry Society Transactions. He received the CPS Researcher of the Year Award from the University of British Columbia in 2008 and the Ambassador Award from the Cancer Research Society in 2017. He has also served in leadership roles such as Chair of the Scientific Advisory Board for the Cancer Research Society and Founding Member of the School of Biomedical Engineering at the University of British Columbia.

== Selected publications ==
- Alan, Parsa; Vandevoorde, Kurt R.; Joshi, Bharat; Cardoen, Ben; Gao, Guang; Mohammadzadeh, Yahya; Hamarneh, Ghassan; Nabi, Ivan R. (November 2022). "Basal Gp78-dependent mitophagy promotes mitochondrial health and limits mitochondrial ROS". Cellular and Molecular Life Sciences. 79 (11): 565. doi:10.1007/s00018-022-04585-8. PMC 9596570. PMID 36284011.
- Cardoen, Ben; Vandevoorde, Kurt R.; Gao, Guang; Ortiz-Silva, Milene; Alan, Parsa; Liu, William; Tiliakou, Ellie; Vogl, A. Wayne; Hamarneh, Ghassan; Nabi, Ivan R. (1 January 2024). "Membrane contact site detection (MCS-DETECT) reveals dual control of rough mitochondria–ER contacts". Journal of Cell Biology. 223 (1) e202206109. doi:10.1083/jcb.202206109. PMC 10638097. PMID 37948126.
- Khater, Ismail M.; Liu, Qian; Chou, Keng C.; Hamarneh, Ghassan; Nabi, Ivan Robert (8 July 2019). "Super-resolution modularity analysis shows polyhedral caveolin-1 oligomers combine to form scaffolds and caveolae". Scientific Reports. 9 (1): 9888. Bibcode:2019NatSR...9.9888K. doi:10.1038/s41598-019-46174-z. PMC 6614455. PMID 31285524.
