= UBC Sauder School of Business =

Business school of the University of British Columbia

University of British Columbia Sauder School of Business
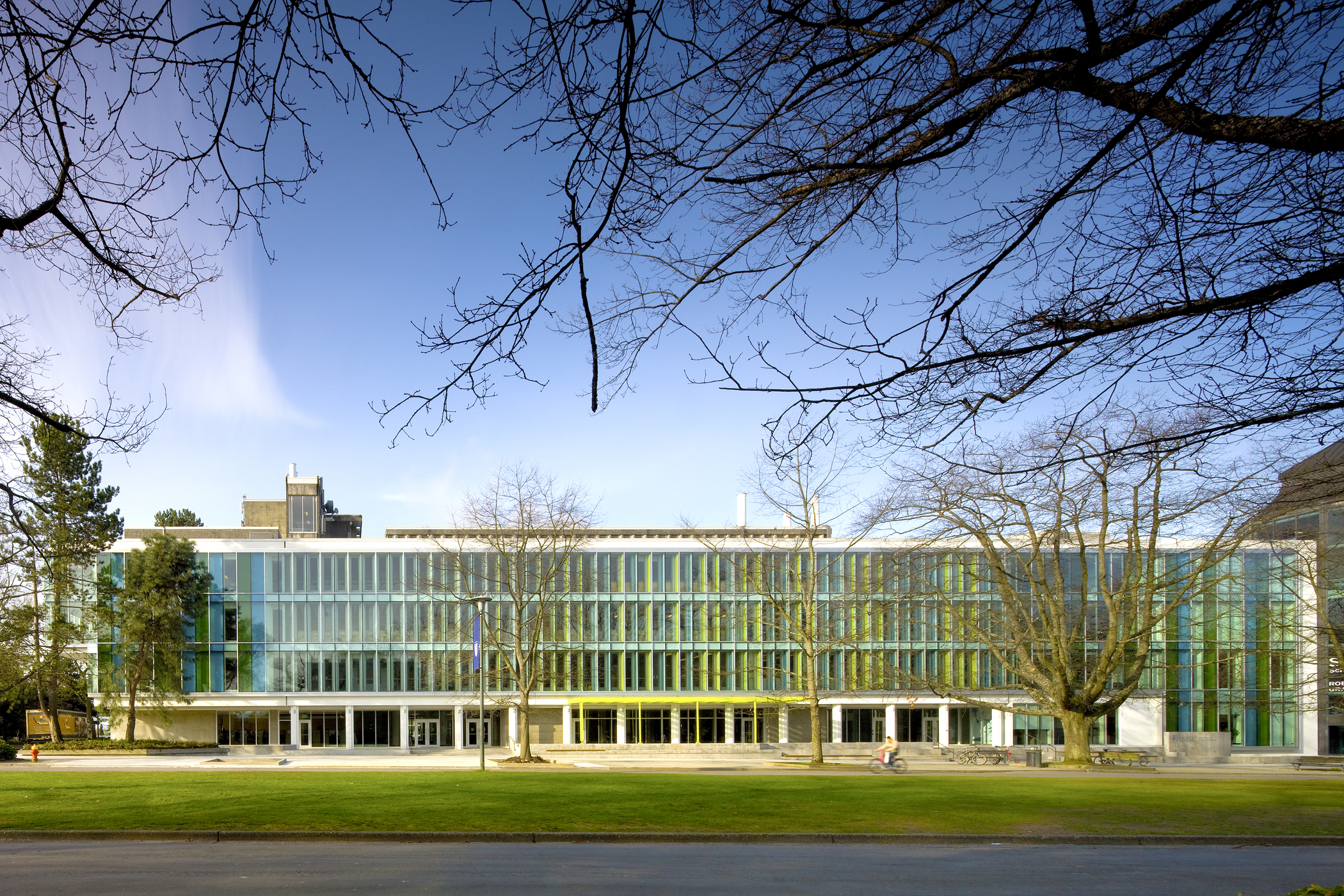
- Front facade of the school's main building
- Motto: Opening Worlds
- Type: Public business school
- Established: 1956; 70 years ago
- Parent institution: University of British Columbia
- Dean: Darren Dahl
- Faculty: Over 200 staff and faculty
- Undergraduates: 3,900
- Postgraduates: 200 MBA (full-time), 100 MBA (part-time), 80 International MBA, 50 MBAN, 100 MM, 80 MSc/PhD
- Location: Vancouver, British Columbia, Canada
- Campus: Urban, 402 ha (993 acres)
- Colours: Green, blue, yellow and grey
- Website: sauder.ubc.ca

The UBC Sauder School of Business is the business school of the University of British Columbia. It is located in Vancouver on UBC's Point Grey campus and has a secondary teaching facility at UBC Robson Square downtown. UBC Sauder has been accredited by AACSB since 2003. The faculty's official administrative name is the Faculty of Commerce and Business Administration. The current dean is Darren Dahl (since 2022).

== History ==
First established in 1956, the UBC Faculty of Commerce and Business Administration was renamed UBC Sauder School of Business in 2003, in recognition of a donation of a $20 million endowment by William Sauder.

Following a donation from Vancouver business philanthropist Robert H. Lee, the Robert H. Lee Graduate School was established at UBC Sauder in 2006 to support graduate-level education.

In 2012, the UBC Sauder School of Business completed a major renovation to its Henry Angus Building on the UBC campus, adding 55,000 square feet to the original 216,000 square-foot building. The renovation was designed by Acton Ostry Architects and added the Cannacord Learning Commons, Wayne Dean Investment Analysis Centre, and the Bruce Birmingham Undergraduate Centre along with new classrooms and a conference center.

== Programs ==
The UBC Sauder School of Business offers the following programs:

=== Graduate Programs (Robert H. Lee Graduate School) ===
==== Masters of Business Administration (MBA) ====
Students in UBC Sauder's MBA program choose between one of four career tracks (Technology and analytics leadership; Finance; Product and service management; and, Innovation and entrepreneurship), or build a custom career track. The program culminates with a three-day live-case competition, where students present solutions to real business problems to CEOs and business leaders.

The full-time MBA is 16 months, with intake in August. Part-time MBA, covering the same material as the full-time MBA takes longer, with classes delivered every two to three weekends at the UBC Point Grey campus.

===== Rankings =====
UBC Sauder is consistently ranked among the top 100 business schools by organizations such as the Financial Times and The Economist. The MBA program was indexed as the 16th best in North America in the 2015 QS Global 200 Business Schools Report. In 2015, the Financial Times ranked the MBA ranked second among Canadian business schools and in the top 5% of MBA programs worldwide; UBC Sauder was also ranked #1 in North America for “international mobility”, #1 in North America for "international faculty", and #5 in North America for International Students. The UBC MBA program has also been recognized in the Corporate Knights 2014 Global Green MBA Survey as 2nd in the world for its efforts to integrate sustainability into business education and was listed 23rd by Forbes in its top global business schools report. The school is also a founding member of the Canadian MBA Alliance which was created in 2013. All six members of the alliance rank among the world’s top 100 schools, according to their participation in key rankings – Financial Times, Business Week, and The Economist.

==== International Masters of Business Administration (IMBA) ====
The 20-month part-time IMBA, in collaboration with the Antai College of Economics and Management at Shanghai Jiao Tong University, was launched in 2002. The program offers the chance to study part-time in China, and a two-week residency at the UBC Point Grey campus in Vancouver. The UBC IMBA program has been adapted for the Chinese and Asian markets and is taught entirely in English by UBC Sauder School of Business professors. IMBA students also conclude their program with a case competition.

==== Masters of Management (MM) ====
The Masters of Management is a 9-month pre-experience program, designed for recent graduates looking to complement their bachelor's degree in non-business disciplines. The MM program teaches financial reporting, organizational behavior, and strategic management in a collaborative environment. Throughout the program, students also receive career development programming, consult for non-for-profit organizations with the Community Business Project, and may participate in study abroad programs. The Masters of Management has been recognized as one of the top 50 Masters of Management degrees in the world by the 2014 Financial Times.

==== Bachelor + Masters of Management (B+MM) Dual Degree ====
The Bachelor + Masters of Management Dual Degree program is a program offering both a bachelor's degree and a Master of Management.

==== PhD in Business Administration ====
The PhD in Business Administration is completed through a four-year program at UBC's Sauder School of Business, consisting of two years of coursework followed by a thesis completion and an oral defense.

=== Undergraduate Program: Bachelor of Commerce (BCom) ===
UBC Sauder's Bachelor of Commerce offers twelve different specializations: Accounting, Marketing, Real Estate, Finance, International Business, Operations & Logistics, Organizational Behavior & Human Resources, General Business Management, Business Technology Management, Global Supply Chain and Logistics Management, Entrepreneurship and Business & Computer Science. Students can further choose to add one of four concentrations: Sustainability and Social Impact, Business Analytics, Business Law, or International Business.

==== Admissions ====
The minimum required grade point average is 84%. The entering class of 2017 had a mean GPA of 96%.

In the Times Higher Education World University Rankings 2016–2017, UBC Sauder is ranked 1st in Canada and 19th globally for business and economics studies.

In 2020, UBC Sauder had over 5000 applicants for 740 spots for its Bachelor of Commerce program giving the program an applicant to placement percentage of approximately 14.8%.

According to the British Columbia Higher Education Accountability Dataset, UBC Sauder Bcom is the most competitive bachelor program in British Columbia with students residing within British Columbia that put Sauder as their first choice yielding a 40% admittance rate with 52% of them accepting their offer to the program.

The University of British Columbia (Vancouver) Business/Commerce, general
Year	Sum of APPLICANTS	Sum of ADMITTED STUDENTS FIRST CHOICE	Sum of REGISTERED STUDENTS FIRST CHOICE	Sum of Admit_rate	Sum of Yield_rate
2012–2013	4,292	1,540	843	36%	55%
2013–2014	4,552	1,585	861	35%	54%
2014–2015	4,442	1,778	924	40%	52%
2015–2016	4,659	1,731	838	37%	48%
2016–2017	4,018	1,696	856	42%	50%
2017–2018	4,052	1,721	862	42%	50%
2018–2019	4,171	1,682	852	40%	51%

This is the acceptance rate for students applying to Sauder from British Columbia from 2012 to 2019 (Out of Province and International Applicants are not included).

The dual undergraduate degree with Sciences Po was a program in which undergraduate students earned a Bachelor of Arts from Sciences Po and a Bachelor of Commerce from the UBC Sauder School of Business in four years. Students spent two years at one of three Sciences Po campuses in France (Le Havre, Menton, or Reims). Then, students enrolled at UBC. Graduates of the program are guaranteed admission to a Sciences Po graduate program. The dual undergraduate degree program with Sciences Po has since been discontinued, with the last intake of students occurring in September 2017.

==== Post-Baccalaureate Programs ====
- Diploma in Accounting (DAP)
- Diploma in Marketing & Sales Management

=== Non-Degree Programs ===
==== Portfolio Management Foundation ====
The Portfolio Management Foundation (PMF) is a two-year extracurricular program that is available to BCom students starting at the end their 2nd year. The program provides training and professional mentorship while the students are tasked with managing a $10 million investment portfolio. The program is run by the Dean of Sauder School of Business along with a PMF Board of Directors.

==== Executive Education ====
UBC Sauder offers Executive Education with more than 100 seminars and offers custom programs for organizations, which include executive training programs in Asia and Europe. It has partnerships with the Project Management Institute, Edumine and the FRED Scholars (SM) Program. UBC Sauder's Executive Education was ranked 51st in the world in 2013 by the Financial Times.

==== Real Estate Division ====
The Real Estate Division at UBC Sauder is a supplier of online and classroom education services: licensing and mortgage brokerage courses and examinations as well as credit and professional development courses. UBC Sauder offers real estate licensing services on behalf of regulatory bodies in British Columbia like BCREA, PAMA, RECBC, and AIC among others.

All courses are available by distance education and assistance is given to students via webinars, online resources, and email and telephone tutoring.

The Real Estate Division also has a publishing arm, providing print and online publications like real estate textbooks, workbooks, case studies, on-line lectures and custom produced course materials.

==== Other non-degree programs ====
- Ch'nook Indigenous Business Programs
- Business Families Centre Programs for Families & Advisors

== Research ==
UBC Sauder consistently ranks in the top 30 – among non-U.S. business schools worldwide – for business research by the Social Science Research Network (SSRN). The SSRN ranks UBC Sauder 16th out of 771 international business schools, not including U.S. schools, for research downloads of all time.

=== Research Centres ===
The school is host to 15 specialized research centres.

== Notable alumni ==
- Jim Chu, formerly Chief Constable of the Vancouver Police Department
- Yael Cohen, non-profit executive and philanthropist. Founder of Fuck Cancer
- Herb Dhaliwal, businessman, real estate developer and philanthropist
- Lalith Gamage, CEO of Sri Lanka Institute of Information Technology
- David Ing, marketing scientist, and senior consultant
- Frank Iacobucci, BCom 1961, Former puisne justice, Supreme Court of Canada, and former dean, University of Toronto's Faculty of Law
- Paul Lee, former president of Electronic Arts
- Robert H. Lee, chairman Prospero Group, real estate developer, philanthropist
- Brandt C. Louie, president and CEO of H.Y. Louie Co. Limited, and chairman of London Drugs Limited.
- Kyle MacDonald, blogger and founder of the One red paperclip website
- Henry McKinnell, CEO and chairman of the board, Pfizer
- John H. McArthur, BCom 1957, dean emeritus, Harvard Business School
- Nadir Mohamed, BCom 1978, former CEO, Rogers Communications
- Sarah Morgan-Silvester BCom 1982, chancellor, University of British Columbia
- Ben Rutledge, BCom 2006, Canadian rower and '08 Olympic gold-medalist
- Gregg Saretsky, MBA 1984, president & CEO, WestJet
- Jim Pattison, CEO of the Jim Pattison Group
- Eden Shand, MBA 1968, environmentalist, Trinidad and Tobago Minister of External Affairs and International Trade (1988–1991)
- William Sauder, BCom 1948, chairman of International Forest Products Ltd. and Sauder Industries
- Ken Sim, BCom 1993, Mayor of Vancouver
- Peter Todd, PhD, former dean of McGill University's Desautels Faculty of Management, dean of HEC Paris
- John Yap, MBA 1983, Minister of Advance Education and Minister Responsible for Multiculturalism, Province of BC
- Peter Wall, property developer
- Nolan Watson, Co-founder, President and CEO of Sandstorm Gold Royalties
- Brian Wong, Founder Kiip, internet entrepreneur
- Jacki Zehner, BCom 1987, youngest female partner in Goldman Sachs' history

== Controversies ==
In 2013 Commerce Undergraduate Society members faced controversy for participating in a rape chant during the beginning of the school year. The incident made national headlines.
