= Larry Cochran =

Canadian psychologist

Larry Cochran is a Canadian psychologist and Professor of Counseling Psychology at the University of British Columbia. In his writings he argues that life cycles can be observed.

== Bibliography ==
- Career Counseling: A Narrative Approach ISBN 0-7619-0442-5
- The sense of vocation: About the choice of vocation; life choices ISBN 0-7914-0245-2
- Becoming an agent: patterns and dynamics for shaping your life 1994 ISBN 0-7914-1719-0
- Portrait and Story: Dramaturgical Approaches to the Study of Persons ISBN 0-313-24966-0
- Position and the Nature of Personhood:An Approach to the Understanding of Persons ISBN 0-313-24633-5
- The Meaning of Grief: A Dramaturgical Approach to Understanding Emotion ISBN 0-313-25607-1
