= Parisa Mehrkhodavandi =

Canadian chemist

- Education: University of British Columbia B.Sc. (1998); Massachusetts Institute of Technology Ph.D. (2002)
- Scientific career
- Workplaces: University of British Columbia (2005-present); California Institute of Technology (2002-2005)
- Thesis: Living α-olefin polymerization by cationic zirconium and hafnium complexes containing chelating diamidopyridine ligands (2002)
- Doctoral advisor: Richard R. Schrock
- Other academic advisors: Chris Orvig, John E. Bercaw and Robert H. Grubbs

Parisa Mehrkhodavandi is a Canadian chemist and Professor of Chemistry at the University of British Columbia (UBC). Her research focuses on the design of new catalysts that can effect polymerization of sustainably sourced or biodegradable polymers.

== Education and training ==
Parisa Mehrkhodavandi completed her undergraduate degree in chemistry at the University of British Columbia in 1998. During her undergraduate, she worked with Prof. Chris Orvig on the synthesis of novel sugar-containing chelating ligands, and studies on the binding of these ligands to transition metal ions. Mehrkhodavandi also studied cationic lanthanide coordination complexes.

Mehrkhodavandi pursued graduate studies at the Massachusetts Institute of Technology under the supervision of Richard R. Schrock. Her work at MIT focused on the synthesis of cationic zirconium and hafnium complexes bearing arylated diamidopyridine ligands, and the polymerization of 1-hexene with these catalysts. Mehrkhodavandi graduated with her Ph.D. in 2002.

She conducted a post-doctoral research stint at the California Institute of Technology working together with John E. Bercaw and Robert H. Grubbs. There, she studied the mechanism of a reaction of methanol to triptane with indium(III) iodide and zinc(II) iodide as catalysts.

== Independent career ==
Mehrkhodavandi returned to the University of British Columbia as faculty in 2005 and was later promoted to associate professor in 2013, and subsequently promoted to Professor in 2018.

Over her career, Mehrkhodavandi has been recognized with numerous awards, including but not limited to:

- Alexander von Humboldt Fellowship (2015)
- UBC Killam Research Fellowship (2015)
- Ichikizaki Travel Award (2008, 2010)
- Government of France Mobility Award (2008)
- NSERC University Faculty Award (2005)
- NSERC Post Graduate Scholarship (2001)

== Research ==
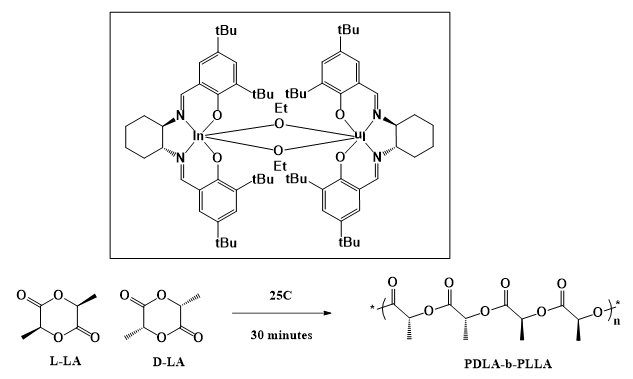
Mehrkhodavandi is interested in developing catalysts that are highly active and enantioselective for the polymerization of lactide. Currently, catalysts for similar polymerizations must strike a balance between activity and enantioselectivity; the highly-active catalysts have poor enantioselectivity and vice versa.

Mehrkhodavandi’s research focuses on catalysis, where her group is pursuing new ligand design strategies. Her work has contributed to new synthetic routes for biodegradable polymers, and fundamental insights into polymerization mechanisms. Her group has a specific interest in the formation of catalysts, such as chiral dinuclear indium complexes, that allow for enantioselective organic reactions. Mehrkhodavandi is also working on the development of biodegradable polyesters using these ligands using cyclic ester monomers. This is being done in three main ways: the first of which is the use of Lewis acid metal centers with chiral ligand supports to open cyclic lactones via ring-opening polymerizations. The second is the use of a chiral indium salen catalyst that allows for more precise iso-selectivity similar to chiral aluminum salen catalysts, but with higher activity than aluminum catalysts. The final method utilizes an ethoxy-bridged dinuclear indium catalyst that allows for the creation of diblock copolymers due to its high activity and selective control.

Mehrkhodavandi has patented salen indium catalysts for the ring-opening polymerization of cyclic ester monomers like lactides.

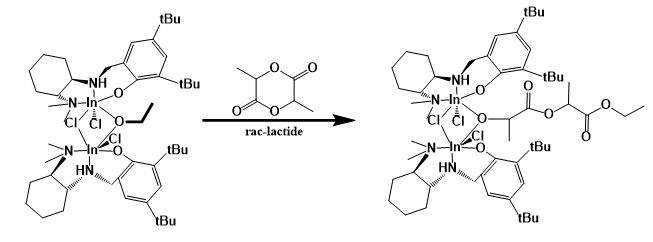
Mehrkhodavandi’s research interests involve developing catalysts for ring-opening polymerizations. Ring-opening polymerizations involve opening up a ring-molecule via. nucleophillic attack to form a nucleophillic monomer, which can then continue the reaction to form a polymer. For different combinations of nucleophiles and rings, different catalysts are required.

== Publications ==
Mehrkhodavandi has published a significant amount of publications over her career. In recent works, Mehrkhodavandi writes about the role of the first alkoxide-bridged indium complex and the zinc analogues as important catalysts in the ring opening polymerization of lactides into polylactic acid. The article pertains to how the indium complex bearing either the chiral or achiral ligand allows for the polymerization of racemic lactide into a highly heterotactic polylactic acid and how the indium complex along with the chiral ligand polymerizes meso-lactide into virtually atactic polylactic acid. Mehrkhodavandi discusses the mechanisms of these reactions in detail, along with the synthesis of the catalysts and activity of the resulting polymers. In another paper, Mehrkhodavandi writes about the use of an indium catalyst as a catalyst for lactide polymerization that has both high activity and high enantioselectivity - other lactide polymerizations feature either high activity or high enantioselectivity. The results demonstrate site control as the primary factor behind the selectivity of the catalyst.
