= Pediatric pathology =

Sub-specialty of pathology concerning children

Pediatric pathology is the sub-specialty of surgical pathology which deals with the diagnosis and characterization of neoplastic and non-neoplastic diseases of children. The duties of pediatric pathologists can be divided into two categories: the examination of tissue samples, and the performing autopsies and placental examinations.
