= Neil Guppy =

- Born: December 1, 1949 (age 76); North Bay, Ontario, Canada
- Education: Queen's University (BA) University of Waterloo (MA, PhD)
- Website: https://sociology.ubc.ca/profile/neil-guppy/

Neil Guppy (born December 1, 1949) is a professor and sociologist at the University of British Columbia in Vancouver, Canada. He was the department head of sociology until 2013. He has written several works relating to social inequality and education.

== Early life and education ==
Neil Guppy was born in North Bay, Ontario on December 1, 1949. His father worked for Ontario Hydro.

Guppy graduated in 1972 from Queen's University with a B.A. in sociology and a B.P.H.E in physical education. He continued his studies at the University of Waterloo (UW) where he gained his masters of science in human kinetics in 1974. From there, Guppy continued to study at UW to attain his Ph.D. in sociology in 1981.

== Career ==
Guppy joined the University of British Columbia in 1979, starting his career as an Instructor II in sociology at UBC from 1979 to 1981. After receiving his Ph.D. at the University of Waterloo, Guppy became an assistant professor of sociology from 1981, associate in 1987, and full professor in 1993. Three years later Guppy was appointed Associate Dean of the Faculty of Arts at UBC. He fulfilled this role until 1999, when he became the Associate Vice President of Academic Programs at UBC up until 2004. In 2006, Guppy became the Head of the Department of Sociology. In 2016 he was appointed as the Senior Advisor to the Provost on Academic Freedom at UBC. In that same year he won the Canadian Sociological Association's Outstanding Contributions Award. His paper, with Nicole Luongo, "The Rise and Stall of the Gender-Equity Revolution in Canada" was awarded an outstanding paper prize in 2016.

== Publications ==
Guppy's work ranges from issues dealing with education in Canada to analyses of social inequality. Below are a few of the works he has collaborated on:

- Education in Canada: Recent Trends and Future Challenges, Ottawa: Statistics Canada by Guppy, Neil and Scott Davies
- The Schooled Society: An Introduction to the Sociology of Education Toronto, by Guppy, Neil and Davies, Scott
- Successful Surveys: Research Methods and Practice (4th Edition) by Guppy, Neil and George Gray.
- "The Rise and Stall of the Gender-Equity Revolution in Canada" Canadian Review of Sociology, 2015.
