= Steven Taylor (psychologist) =

Australian clinical psychologist

- Education: University of Melbourne; University of British Columbia
- Scientific career
- Fields: Clinical psychology
- Institutions: University of British Columbia
- Thesis: The overprediction of fear (1991)

Steven Taylor is an Australian clinical psychologist and professor in the Department of Psychiatry at the University of British Columbia in Canada. He has conducted research on health anxiety for thirty years. In October 2019, about a month before the beginning of the COVID-19 pandemic, Taylor published the book The Psychology of Pandemics. When Taylor proposed the book to his publisher at the time, they rejected the book, telling him that the subject seemed interesting, but that nobody would want to read the book. He then convinced a different publishing company to publish the book instead.
