= Paul Lee (Canadian entrepreneur) =

Canadian video game developer, venture capitalist, businessman and entrepreneur

Paul Lee is a Canadian video game developer, venture capitalist, businessman, and entrepreneur. He is the former President of Electronic Arts, a video game and interactive software company.

== Early life and education ==
Lee is of Chinese heritage and was born and raised in Vancouver. He received an undergraduate degree from the University of British Columbia, with a Bachelor of Commerce with Honours. Lee was one of six students selected to enter the prestigious Portfolio Management Fund program at the UBC Sauder School of Business, where he was a Leslie Wong Fellow.

Before his career as a game developer took off, Lee worked as an investment manager at Chrysler Canada, managing its pension fund, corporate cash, and health and welfare trust. During his school days, Lee also worked at his father’s Vancouver restaurant, Dragon Inn, and at Save on Foods.

== Career ==
He joined Electronic Arts in 1991 and became an executive when it acquired Distinctive Software, a leading independent video game developer where he was part owner. He served as the President of Worldwide Studios at EA from 2005 to 2007, overseeing product development in 14 studios, managing 6,000 employees, and handling $1 billion in annual capital.

He is the Founder and Managing Partner of Vanedge Capital, a venture capital firm in Vancouver. Established in 2010, the $137 million venture capital fund Vanedge backed Wurldtech, acquired by General Electric in 2014; Recon Instruments, acquired by Intel in 2015; Mediacore, acquired by Workday in 2015, Privacy Analytics, acquired by IMS Health in 2016. Other notable investments by Vanedge include Unity, SpaceX, OmniSci, Plotly, Echodyne, Vendasta, Planet, and Go-Jek.

Before Vanedge Capital and during his time at Electronic Arts, Lee was a notable angel investor in the technology scene in BC, with investments in companies such as ALI Technologies (acquired by McKesson), Blast Radius (acquired by WPP), Bycast (acquired by NetApps), Active State (acquired by Sophos), among others including DWave Systems.

Lee discussed the lack of venture capital support for startups in British Columbia and the reasons he decided to found a venture capital firm there in an interview with BC Business.

== Boards ==
- Vancouver Board of Trade
- Chair of DigiBC
- Canada's representatives to Asia Pacific Economic Council's Business Advisory Council
- Dean's Advisory Council at the UBC Sauder School of Business
- Co-chair of Premier's Technology Council
- D-Wave Systems
- Premier's Jobs and Economic Investment Council

== Awards ==
- Outstanding Young Alumnus Award from the University of British Columbia (1996)
- British Columbia Technology Industries Association Person of the Year Award in 2002.
- Golden Jubilee of Her Majesty Queen Elizabeth II (2003)
- Honorary Fellow of the University of British Columbia's Sauder School of Business.
