= Maja Krzic =

Soil scientist

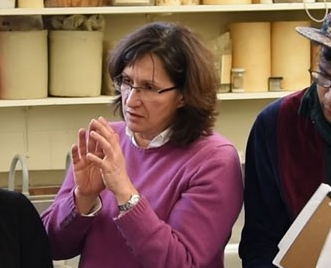
- Occupation: Soil Scientist

Academic background
- Education: University of Belgrade

Academic work
- Discipline: Soil Science
- Sub-discipline: Soil Management, Soil Quality
- Institutions: Faculty of Land and Food Systems; Faculty of Forestry; University of British Columbia

Maja Krzic is a soil scientist and a professor in the Department of Forest & Conservation Sciences in the Faculty of Forestry and Environmental Stewardship with a joint appointment in the Applied Biology and Soil Sciences programs in the Faculty of Land and Food Systems at the University of British Columbia. She is a founder of the Virtual Soil Science Learning Resources Group, a collaborative teaching effort among scientists, students, and multimedia experts from seven universities and three research institutions in Canada that create open access soil science educational resources. She is also the president of the Canadian Society of Soil Science and was named a 3M National Teaching Fellow in 2016.

== Education ==
Krzic has a PhD from the University of British Columbia and a MSc and BSc from the University of Belgrade. Her PhD dissertation, carried under the supervision of Dr. Art Bomke, focused on tillage-planting systems and cover cropping for sweet corn production in the Western Fraser Valley of British Columbia.

== Teaching ==
Krzic has focused on creating open educational resources such as SoilWeb. These innovative soil science teaching tools are used by close to 2000 students in over 30 courses at the University of British Columbia and other universities. One component of SoilWeb is SoilX, which "allows students to access the information through one database and also to upload their own findings, providing students with a sense of ownership in their learning."

Krzic has also collaborated on Forest Humus Forms Quest, a mobile app which enables students to take go on a self-guided scavenger hunt to locate and identify forest floor materials and soil composition.

== Awards and recognition ==
Krzic has received UBC Killam Teaching Award (2006), North American Colleges and Teachers of Agriculture Teaching Award of Merit (2006), Soil Science for Society Award by the Canadian Society of Soil Science (2012), Mentoring Award by the Association for Women Soil Scientists, Soil Science Society of America (2013), and is a 2016 3M National Teaching Fellow. She has also been recognized as a Fellow of the Canadian Society of Soil Science (2022) and a Fellow of the Soil Science Society of America (2023).
