= Pattison Food Group =

Canadian operator of supermarkets

Pattison Food Group Ltd.
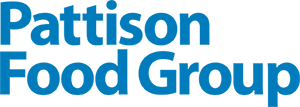
- Type: Subsidiary
- Industry: Supermarket
- Predecessors: Overwaitea Food Group; Buy-Low Foods LP; Quality Foods
- Founded: 1915; 111 years ago
- Headquarters: Langley, British Columbia, Canada
- Key people: Jamie Nelson (president)
- Products: Western Family; Only Goodness
- Number of employees: 15,000 (2015)
- Parent: Jim Pattison Group
- Website: pattisonfoodgroup.com

Pattison Food Group is an operator of supermarkets, based in Langley, British Columbia. It is owned by the Jim Pattison Group. Most stores are under the Save-On-Foods banner, which it launched in 1982.

== History and expansion ==
On March 8, 1915, Robert C. Kidd purchased a store at 746 Columbia Street in New Westminster, British Columbia. He developed several innovative merchandising techniques to attract customers to his store including odd-penny pricing and selling 18 ounces of tea for the price of a pound. The store was soon known as the "over-weight tea" store. When Kidd opened his second store, he decided to call it "Overwaitea".

As of August 2015, the Overwaitea Food Group owned and operated 145 grocery stores in B.C. and Alberta under six different brand names. OFG later opened four stores in Saskatchewan and three stores in Winnipeg, Manitoba during 2016. Additionally, in 2017 a full-size store was opened in Whitehorse, Yukon.

In February 2014, it was announced that Overwaitea would purchase 15 stores from Sobeys, three in Alberta and twelve in British Columbia. The stores purchased were under the Safeway, Thrifty Foods and Sobeys banners and all were converted to become Save-On-Foods stores. It was also announced that Overwaitea would convert 11 PriceSmart Foods locations to the Save-On-Foods brand.

OFG employed over 15,000 team members, as of August 2015.

On March 22, 2018, the Overwaitea Foods banner became defunct with the closure of the last two locations in British Columbia, which were reopened the following day as Save-On-Foods stores.

In August 2019, Calgary Co-op announced that it would switch grocery suppliers from Federated Co-operatives to Overwaitea, stating that this would "better serve members and ensure long-term sustainability".

In 2021, the Overwaitea Food Group was renamed Pattison Food Group. The operations of Buy-Low Foods and Quality Foods, also owned by the Jim Pattison Group, merged into the rebranded company. Later that year, Pattison Food Group acquired Roth's Fresh Markets, a chain of grocery stores in Oregon, marking its first retail expansion outside of western Canada.

== Store Banners ==
- AG Foods
- Bulkley Valley Wholesale
- Buy-Low Foods
- Choices Markets
- Everything Wine
- Meinhardt Fine Foods
- Nature's Fare Markets
- Nesters Market
- PriceSmart Foods
- Pure Integrative Pharmacy
- Quality Foods
- Roth's Fresh Markets
  - Chuck's Produce and Street Market
- Save-On-Foods
- Urban Fare
