= Geraldine Pratt (geographer) =

Canadian geographer

Geraldine Pratt (also known as Gerry Pratt) (born 12 November 1955) is a Canadian geographer, researcher, and professor.

She is currently the Head of Geography at the University of British Columbia, and the Canada Research Chair in Care Economies and Global Labour for the Government of Canada.

Pratt's research focuses on feminism, using theatre to encourage conversations about care work migrants, also focusing on elder care, dementia care, and gerontechnology, and ways to improve existing and create new communities of care. She was the recipient of the 2023 AAG Distinguished Scholarship Honours, and co-editor of the Dictionary of Human Geography (4th and 5th editions).

== Education ==
Pratt earned her Bachelor of Science in Psychology from the University of Toronto in 1977, and her Masters and PhD both in geography from the University of British Columbia in 1980 and 1984, respectively.

== Works ==
Geraldine Pratt has contributed to numerous books, and her research has led to authorship of two books of her own. A series of articles by Pratt and her co-author Susan Hanson culminated in the book Gender, Work, and Space. This book investigates intersections between gender and class, and reveals how the spatial and social segregation of women leads to occupational differences between men and women across geographical regions and socioeconomic classes.

Pratt also authored Working Feminism, which applies feminist theory and geographical perspectives to the struggles faced by Filipina domestic workers in Canada. Research for this book comes from collaboration with the Philippine Women Centre in Vancouver.

- Gender, Work, and Space (1995) with Susan Hanson, ISBN 9780415099417
- Working Feminism (2004). Edinburgh University Press, ISBN 9780748615704
- Film and Urban Space, Critical Possibilities (2014) with Rose Marie San Juan. Edinburgh University Press, ISBN 9780748623846
- Migration in Performance: crossing the colonial present (2019) with Caleb Johnston. Routledge Publishing, ISBN 9780367138301
