= Catherine Dauvergne =

Dean Catherine Dauvergne
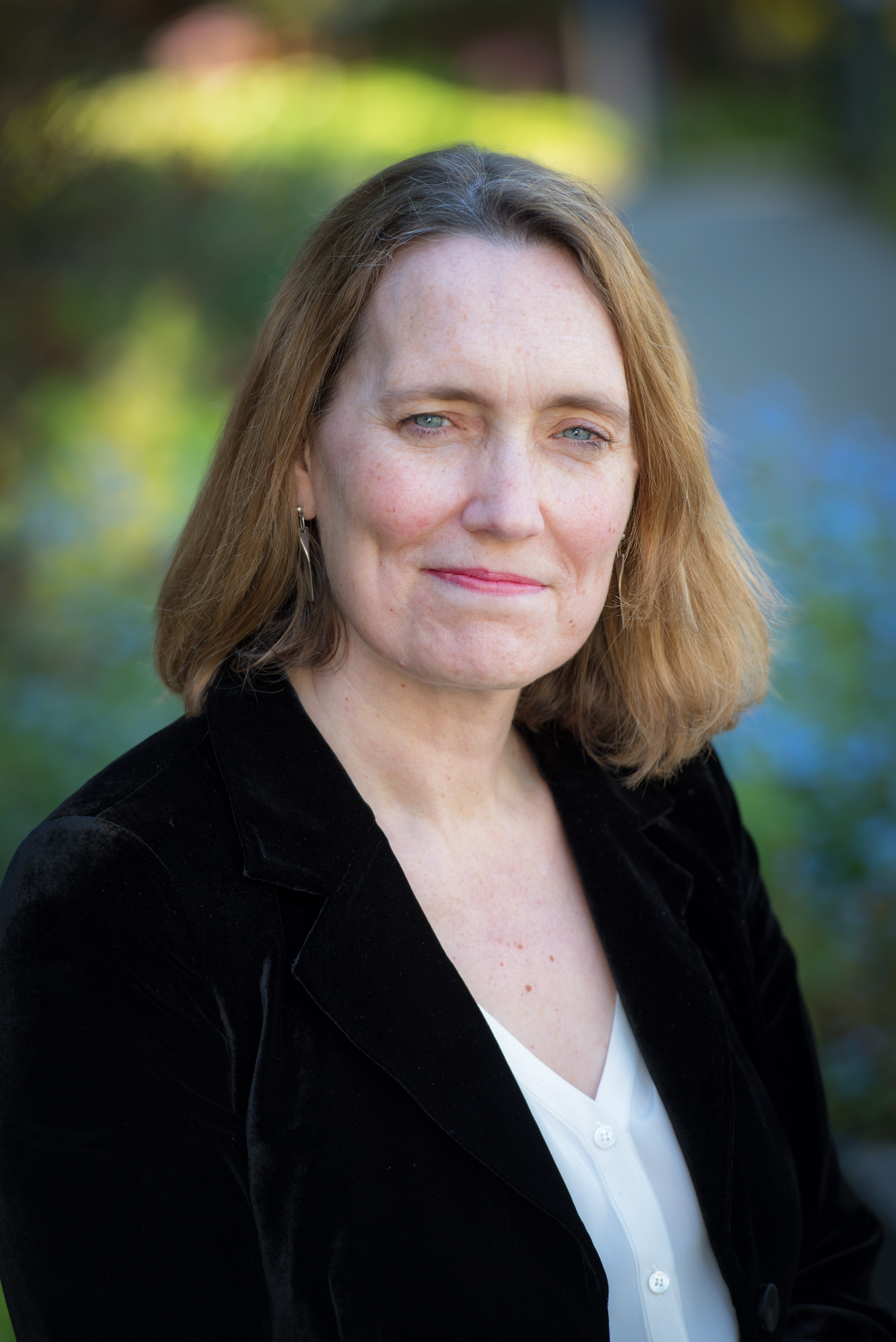
- Citizenship: Canadian
- Known for: Making People Illegal: What Globalization Means for Migration and Law
- Scientific career
- Fields: Immigration law Refugee law Citizenship law
- Institutions: Peter A. Allard School of Law at the University of British Columbia

Catherine Dauvergne was a former Vice-President, Academic and Provost of Simon Fraser University. Previously, she was dean of the Peter A. Allard School of Law at the University of British Columbia from 2015 to 2020. Prior to this, Dauvergne researched refugee, immigration, and citizenship law as a professor.

== Career ==
Dauvergne studied law at the University of British Columbia (UBC) and clerked for Chief Justice Antonio Lamer. She completed her PhD at the Australian National University and was a member of the Faculty of Law at the University of Sydney for four years before returning to Canada.

Dauvergne's 2008 book Making People Illegal: What Globalization Means for Migration and Law (Cambridge University Press) has been reprinted three times.

From 2002 to 2012, Dauvergne held the Canada Research Chair in Migration Law at UBC. From 2015 to 2020, she was dean of the Peter A. Allard School of Law at UBC.

She has also worked as a Pierre Elliott Trudeau Foundation Fellow.

== Published works ==
- Making People Illegal: What Globalization Means for Migration and Law, Cambridge University Press, 2008.
- Gendering Canada's Refugee Process, Status of Women Canada, 2006 (with co-authors Leonora Angeles and Agnes Huang)
- Humanitarianism, Identity and Nation, UBC Press, 2005 ISBN 0-7748-1112-9
- Jurisprudence for an Interconnected Globe (edited by Catherine Dauvergne). Aldershot and Burlington: Ashgate, 2003. ISBN 0-7546-2282-7
