= Robert H. Lee =

Canadian businessman (1933–2020)

Robert Horne Lee CM OBC (25 June 1933 – 19 February 2020) was a Canadian businessman, investor, and philanthropist. He was the founder and chairman of Prospero, a real estate firm in Vancouver, British Columbia.

== Biography ==
Lee was born and raised in Vancouver and grew up in the Chinatown neighbourhood. His father immigrated from China and settled in Vancouver, where he opened a restaurant. Lee worked in his father's restaurant as a cook.

Lee studied at a Chinese school for 12 years. In his early teenage years, he became interested in the real estate business and often shared this interest with his father. He aspired to become an entrepreneur. Lee enrolled at the Sauder School of Business at the University of British Columbia where he studied business and graduated in 1956.

After graduating from Sauder, Lee opened a real estate business and began to build an extensive network that included Tong Louie, the founder of the retail store chain London Drugs and philanthropist David Lam, later B.C.'s lieutenant governor, who immigrated to Canada from Hong Kong in 1967.

Lee's breakthrough into real estate came in the 1960s, when there was widespread fear of a Communist China takeover of the British colony of Hong Kong. A mass exodus of Hong Kong Chinese immigrants made their way to Vancouver and many of these newcomers were advised to visit Lee because he could speak their language.

During this time, he expanded his business into apartment building. In 1979, he founded Prospero, which had a diverse real estate portfolio, from retail to office and industrial properties. Prospero now has properties in the Okanagan, on Vancouver Island, and in Greater Vancouver. The company also has a property management division and is now run by Lee's son, Derek.

== Philanthropy ==
An ardent philanthropist, Lee donated money to a myriad of causes in Vancouver's Chinatown, including the Chinese School which he graduated from as well as to the University of British Columbia, where the Robert H. Lee Graduate School was named in his honour. He also sent money to his ancestral home village in China. The Robert Lee YMCA (Downtown Vancouver) is named after him in recognition of his leadership donation towards the new facility. A member for 45 years, Mr. Lee made the YMCA a part of his daily life.

== Awards and memberships ==
Lee was a recipient of many awards. He received the Order of British Columbia and was named Businessman of the Year in 1990, selected by a panel of Chinese-Canadian businessmen and the Vancouver Board of Trade. He was also a trustee of the Bank of British Columbia, a directorship of the Real Estate Institute of Canada, Vancouver Foundation, B.C. Paraplegic Foundation and of the Port Authority of Vancouver. He also received an Order of Canada and an Honorary Doctorate of Law UBC.

He also was a longtime member of YMCA Vancouver and served as a director of Crown Life Insurance, Canadian National Railway and Wall Financial Corporation. In addition, Lee was a Governor and later (1993–96) Chancellor of the University of British Columbia, and was responsible for generating $1.7 billion for the school's endowment as a founding member of the UBC Properties Fund.

== Personal life ==
Lee's wife Lily was also graduate of the University of British Columbia. They had four children, all of whom (and their spouses) are graduates of that same university. Lee died on February 19, 2020, after a short illness.
