= Jim Pattison =

Canadian businessman (born 1928)

Jim Pattison OC OBC
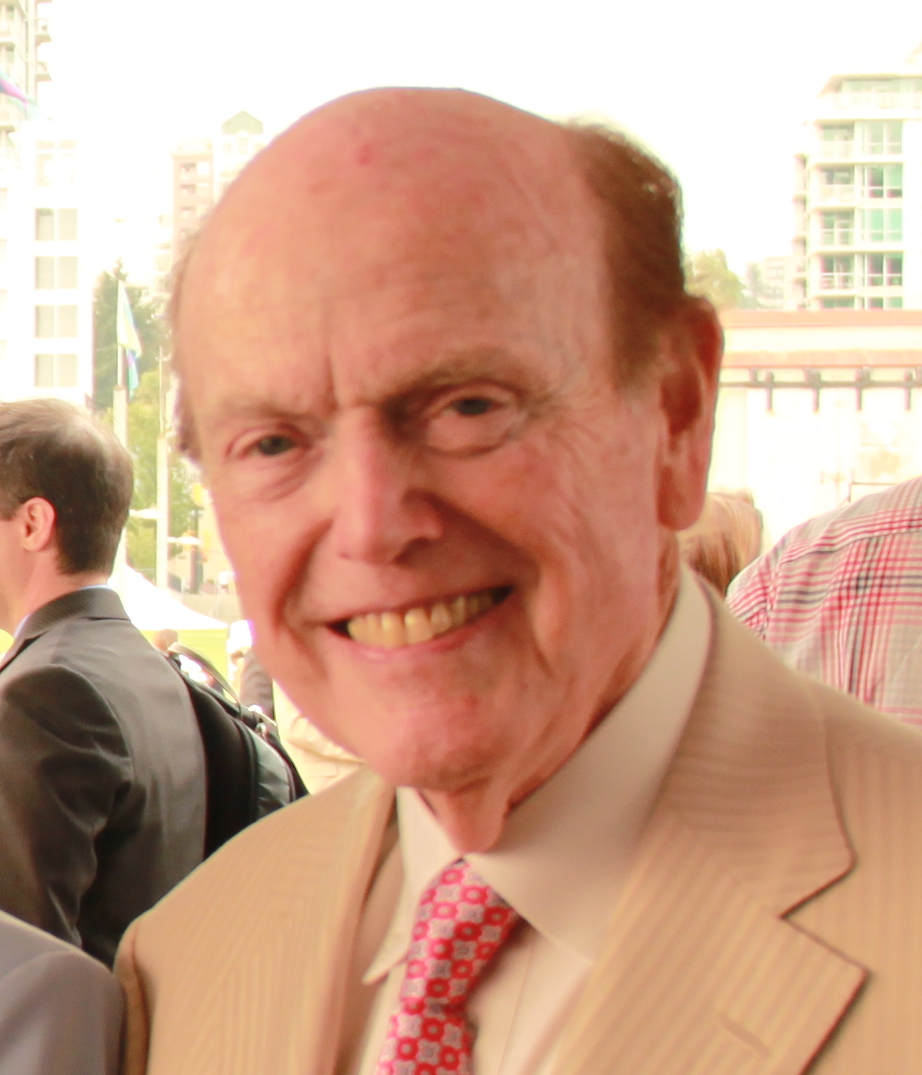
- Pattison in 2015
- Born: James Allen Pattison; October 1, 1928 (age 98); Saskatoon, Saskatchewan, Canada
- Education: University of British Columbia (attended)
- Known for: Founder of the Jim Pattison Group
- Spouse: Mary Hudson
- Children: 3

James Allen Pattison OC OBC (born October 1, 1928) is a Canadian business magnate and investor. He is based in Vancouver, British Columbia, where he holds the position of chief executive officer, chairman and sole owner of the Jim Pattison Group, Canada's second largest privately held company, with more than 45,000 employees worldwide, and annual sales of $10.1 billion. The Group is active in 25 divisions, according to Forbes, including packaging, food, and forestry products.

In 2015, he was considered to be Canada's fourth richest person. According to Forbes, Pattison's net worth in late 2018 was $5.7 billion, having increased substantially from the $2.1 billion reported in March 2009. At the time, he was described as Canada's third richest man by Bloomberg News. As of October 2026, his net worth is estimated at US$12 billion by Forbes

Pattison was inducted into Canada's Walk of Fame in December 2018, having previously been appointed to the Order of Canada (1987) and the Order of British Columbia (1990), and receiving the Governor General’s Commemorative Medal for the 125th Anniversary in Canada. Other recognitions include being inducted into the Canadian Business Hall of Fame and the Canadian Professional Sales Association Hall of Fame, as well as Entrepreneur of the Year – Lifetime Achievement Award (2000), the International Horatio Alger Award (U.S.A., 2004), and the Young Presidents Organization Canadian Icon Award (2007).

== Early life and education ==
Jim Pattison was born in Saskatoon, in the province of Saskatchewan, Canada. His parents were Americans whose families moved to Canada around the turn of the 20th century to homestead. In those days, the Canadian government gave farms to homesteaders who worked the land for 10 years.

When he was born, Pattison's parents resided in the rural town of Luseland, Saskatchewan, and he was born at the hospital in nearby Saskatoon.

The family moved to East Vancouver, British Columbia when Pattison was six years old, but he returned to Saskatchewan during summers. During the Great Depression, Pattison's father, who was then a partner in a car dealership in Luseland, had lost everything financially. The family was forced to move to Vancouver, where Pattison's father earned a living going door to door repairing pianos for $2. Pattison accompanied his father on his service calls to help him, and his mother home schooled him in the evenings. They were living in a rented, furnished attic room for $2 a month.

Pattison's first summer job was playing trumpet at a children's church camp and later picking fruit (raspberries, cherries, and peaches) during the summer while in high school. Pattison held many jobs while in high school, including selling doughnuts in the school parking lot, selling seeds door-to-door, delivering newspapers, and working as a page boy at the Georgia Hotel. He graduated from John Oliver Secondary School in 1947.

After high school, he worked in a cannery, a packing house, as a labourer building bridges in the mountains, and then for the Canadian Pacific Railway as a dining car attendant before accepting a job washing cars at a gas station with a small attached used-car lot. By chance, while the regular salesman was away, Pattison sold one of the cars on the lot and found his calling. He parlayed his sales success into a job selling used cars during the summer at one of the largest used-car lots in Vancouver, using his earnings that he made to pay for his tuition while studying at the University of British Columbia's Sauder School of Business (Pattison did not complete his studies, since he was three classes short of a completing a four-year bachelor's of commerce degree).

== Business career ==
In the summer of 1948, while taking a break from his studies, Pattison was employed at Richmond Motors in the southern Vancouver suburb of Richmond, British Columbia. Although he was primarily responsible for washing cars, his job also involved selling them. In summer 1949, he worked for Kingsway, a used car dealer in Vancouver. "I worked there all summer and then [my boss] gave me a car to drive to university. So, I then started to sell used cars at UBC," Pattison told a reporter.

In 1961 he was able to persuade a Royal Bank manager to lend him $40,000, significantly more than the branch's lending limit, to open a Pontiac dealership on Main Street near his children's elementary school. To complete the funding, he also sold his house, assigned the cash surrender value of his life insurance policy to General Motors and took a loan from GM for $190,000 for preferred shares in the company. 25 years later, he was selling more cars than anyone else in Western Canada.

His company owned 25 car dealerships as of March 2018, Peterbilt truck dealerships, Overwaitea Foods, Save-On-Foods, Quality Foods, Ripley's Believe It or Not!, Guinness World Records, and radio and TV stations in British Columbia, Alberta, Saskatchewan, and Manitoba. Pattison entered the media business when he bought Vancouver AM radio station CJOR with five partners. The Broadcast Group was Canada’s largest western-based radio and TV company in 2018, with 43 radio stations and three TV stations. Pattison Agriculture is the second-largest John Deere dealer in Canada, with 19 locations in Saskatchewan and Manitoba. He also owned the Vancouver Blazers of the World Hockey Association.

Pattison led the organization of Expo 86 in Vancouver as the chief executive officer and president of the Expo 86 Corporation. When he was appointed to the Order of British Columbia, the award noted, "Although others may have had the initial vision for Expo ’86, it was Jimmy Pattison who was the expediter – the one more than anyone else who made it happen. He demanded much of his team but no more than he himself was prepared to give. This he did, almost full-time over a five-year period, without compensation..."

On February 15, 2008, Jim Pattison Group announced the purchase of the GWR organization, the company known for its Guinness World Records franchise. Its annual book, published in more than 100 countries in 37 languages, is the world's best-selling copyrighted book. Pattison, who owns approximately 30% of the shares of Canfor, was in a dispute over governance with money manager Stephen A. Jarislowsky, whose firm owned 18%. Pattison won and ousted CEO Jim Shepherd over Canfor's poor performance and declining share price, replacing him for the interim with Jim Shepard (no relation).

He was involved with the committee for the 2010 Vancouver Olympics. Among other honours, Pattison is an Officer of the Order of Canada and a member of the Order of British Columbia. He was also listed as No. 177 on the 2015 Forbes list of the world's richest people. He was also listed then as the richest Canadian.

In the latter part of 2018, Pattison continued to remain active in his business career, conducting comprehensive visits to various Pattison Agriculture farm equipment dealerships in the western region, which involved covering extensive distances by driving a pickup truck for thousands of kilometres. When questioned by a Bloomberg reporter as to whether he ever took a vacation throughout his business career, Pattison expressed his passion and dedication for business and investing by stating, ""Well, I get 365 days. If you like your work, it’s not work." In September 2020, at 91 years old, Pattison exhibited an ongoing engagement in his business career and was actively pursuing new investment opportunities. At that time, a news item stated that "Jim Pattison Group Inc. had $10.9 billion in revenue and employed 48,000 people".

In 2026, Jim Pattison Developments announced intentions to sell a 550,000 square foot warehouse to a US government contractor. The company claims they were not aware the warehouse was to be used as an ICE detention camp. On January 30, 2026, the company announced the deal was cancelled, after sustained public pressure from BC Green Party leader Emily Lowan and BC’s largest private sector union, UFCW 1518.

== Philanthropy ==
Imagine Canada rated the Jim Pattison Foundation in 2008 as the eighth largest giver of charitable grants by a private foundation in Canada. That year, Pattison made a $1,000,000 donation as a matching gift for funds raised for the Apostolic Church of Pentecost’s creation of a church planting endowment fund.

On April 16, 2009, Jim Pattison announced that Save-On Foods donated $100,000 to CBC Television in order to rent high-definition television trucks for away games during the Vancouver Canucks' 2009 1st round NHL playoff series against the St. Louis Blues. Prior to this donation, CBC stated that it would not broadcast high-definition away games in St. Louis due to the cost of renting high-definition equipment during the current tough economic times and major cuts to funding for the CBC by the federal government.

Pattison is a well-known philanthropist, and an article in The Globe and Mail noted, "He has always given away 10% of his income." In July 2013, he donated up to $5 million to Victoria Hospitals Foundation (Victoria, British Columbia), to support its "Building Care Together" campaign to purchase new equipment for the new patient care tower at the Royal Jubilee Hospital. In recognition, the hospital named the ground floor lobby of the patient care tower "The Jim Pattison Atrium and Concourse." In 2011, Pattison contributed $5 million to add his name and to match public donations for a $10 million 100-day fundraising campaign in Surrey, British Columbia for the new Jim Pattison Outpatient Care and Surgery Centre run by Fraser Health. Other donations in the past included $20 million Vancouver General Hospital in 1999 and $5 million to the Lions Gate Hospital in 2008.

On March 28, 2017, Pattison donated $75 million to the construction of the new St. Paul's Hospital in Vancouver, a Canadian record for a private donation to a health care provider. On May 30, 2017, Pattison and the Jim Pattison Foundation announced they were donating $50 million, the largest private donation in Saskatchewan history, to the new Children's Hospital of Saskatchewan in Saskatoon, Saskatchewan which opened on September 29, 2019. It was also announced that day the new hospital would be named Jim Pattison Children's Hospital in his honour.

During a March 2018 interview, Pattison made the following comment about his philanthropy. "We’ve got the base of our company – it’s taken us 57 years to build – where we can do some serious things and give serious money away as time goes by. The bigger we get the more money we make, and the more we can give away. We’re just getting into it."

== Personal life ==
Pattison married Mary Hudson, whom he first met at the Swift Current church camp when both were 13. Hudson was from Moose Jaw. Some 66 years later in 2018, Pattison commented, "The secret [to a successful marriage] is to marry somebody from Saskatchewan. Then you won’t have a problem!" The couple has three children.

At a Los Angeles auction on November 17, 2016, Pattison purchased (for $4.8 million) the Jean Louis dress worn by Marilyn Monroe when she sang "Happy Birthday, Mr. President" to President John F. Kennedy at a celebration of his 45th birthday. At the age of 90, in addition to his business endeavours, Pattison remained dedicated to music, finding joy in playing instruments such as the piano, organ, and trumpet. Additionally, he is known to be an avid yachtsman, and owns the Nova Spirit, a 150-foot superyacht valued at approximately $25 million.

== See also ==
- Lists of billionaires
- Economic History of Vancouver
