= Vancouver Hospital and Health Sciences Centre =

- Vancouver Coastal Health
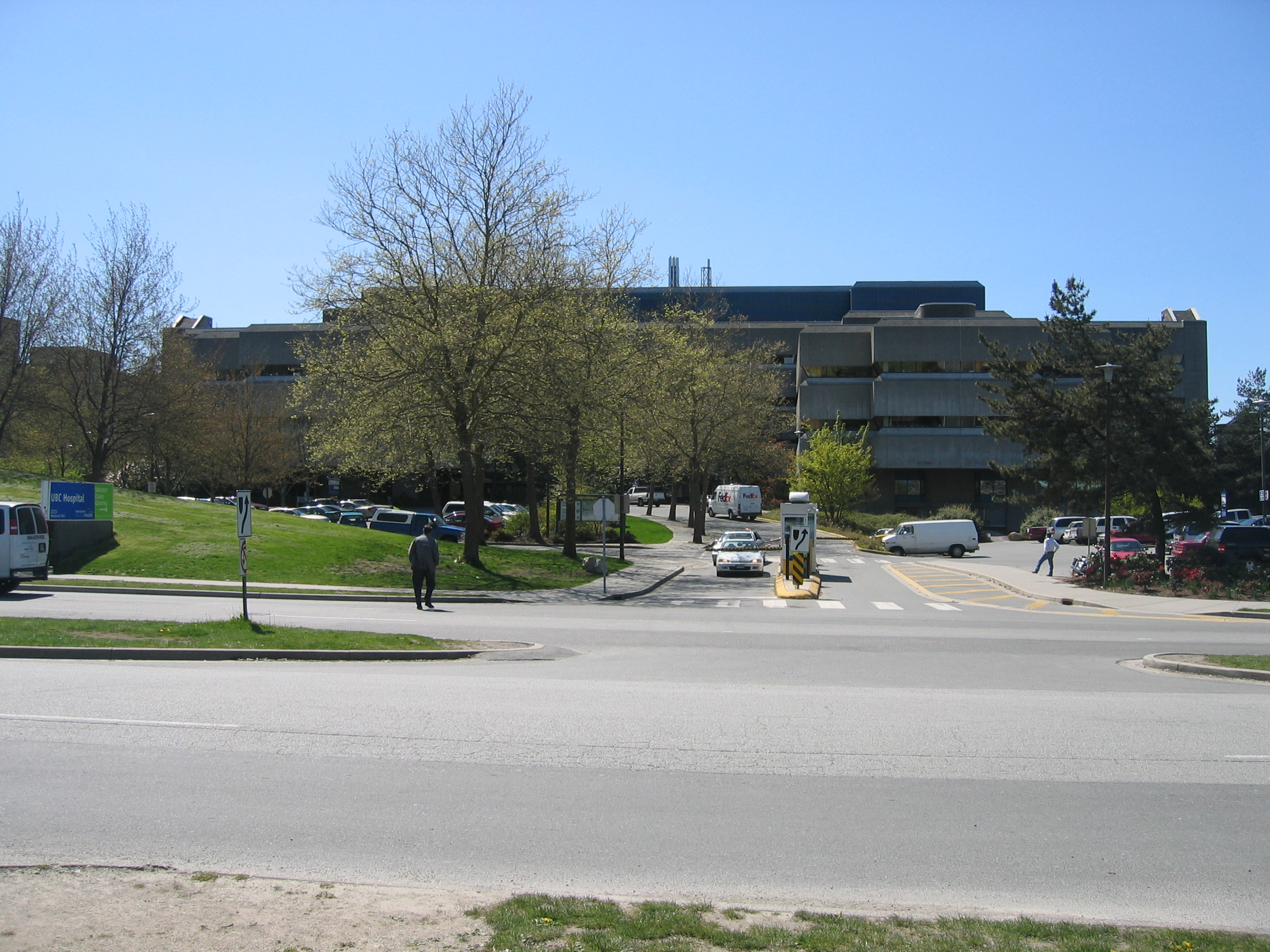
- UBC Hospital as seen from Wesbrook Mall

Geography
- Location: Vancouver, British Columbia, Canada
- Coordinates: 49°15′40″N 123°07′28″W

Organization
- Care system: Public Medicare (Canada) (MSP)
- Type: Teaching
- Affiliated university: UBC Faculty of Medicine

Services
- Emergency department: Yes
- Beds: 1900
- Speciality: Bone Marrow Transplant and Leukemia, Epilepsy Surgery Program, Organ Transplant, Spinal Cord Injury

History
- Founded: 1993

Links
- Website: http://www.vch.ca/
- Lists: Hospitals in Canada

Vancouver Hospital and Health Sciences Centre (VHHSC) is an acute care hospital affiliated with the University of British Columbia and located in Vancouver, British Columbia. The VHHSC is the second largest hospital in Canada, with 1,900 beds and nearly 116,000 patients each year. VHHSC employs 9500 staff and utilizes 1000 volunteers. As of 2005, the hospital's annual budget is $463 million. It is managed by Vancouver Coastal Health.

== History ==
The Vancouver Hospital and Health Sciences Centre was formed in 1993 when Vancouver General Hospital merged with UBC Hospital to operate as one entity on two sites.

In 1995, the GF Strong Rehab Centre and George Pearson Centre merged with the VHHSC.

In the spring of 1997, the VHHSC merged with the BC Rehab Society and the clinical component of the Arthritis Society, BC & Yukon Division. At this point, VHHSC operated at 5 sites.

In 2001, the ownership and operation of VHHSC entities (Vancouver General Hospital, UBC Hospital, George Pearson Centre and G.F. Strong Rehab Centre) was assumed by the Vancouver Coastal Health Authority.

== Facilities ==
VHHSC includes the primary referral, teaching & research hospital in the province and has strong ties with the Faculty of Medicine at the University of British Columbia.

Vancouver Hospital and Health Sciences Centre is composed of two sites: Vancouver General Hospital and UBC Hospital.

VHHSC has neither obstetrics nor pediatrics specialties. These are handled at the nearby BC Women's Hospital and Health Centre and BC Children's Hospital, respectively.

=== Vancouver General Hospital ===
Vancouver General Hospital is the largest hospital in the VHHSC and the second largest hospital in Canada.

=== UBC Hospital ===
The UBC Hospital, located at UBC Vancouver in British Columbia, Canada, opened in 1968. Units include; the Acute Care Unit, Surgical Observation Unit and Urgent Care Centre in Koerner Pavilion, the Extended Care Unit and Transitional Care Unit in Purdy Pavilion, and the Psychiatric Unit in Detwiller Pavilion. Specialty areas at UBC Hospital include: acute medicine, general surgery, reconstructive orthopedic surgery, psychiatry and gerontology.

UBC Hospital has eight operating rooms (including two for the Centre for Surgical Innovation) and 800 staff including 270 physicians and 450 nurses. Patients make approximately 28,000 clinic visits to the hospital, to clinics such as the Bladder Care Centre, Movement Disorders/Parkinson's Clinic, Sleep Disorders Program, Multiple Sclerosis Clinic, the Clinic for Alzheimer Disease and Cognitive Disorders, Breast Reconstruction Program, Mood Disorders Centre and the Operational Stress Injury (OSI) clinic.

The Centre for Surgical Innovation at UBC Hospital, a provincial specialty centre featuring two new operating rooms and 38 inpatient beds, opened in April 2006. Approximately 1600 hip and knee replacement surgeries are performed each year.

The UBC Hospital Urgent Care Centre offers specancialized treatment for non-life-threatening emergencies by emergency trained physicians and nurses. UBC Hospital Urgent Care Centre treat things such as; allergies, asthma, broken bones, cuts that need stitches, eye problems, fevers, flus, IV therapy, minor burns, nosebleeds, skin infections and sprains. The Urgent Care Centre also offers a range of diagnostic services and testing including X-rays, blood tests, Ultrasound, CT scans and ECGs. The Urgent Care Centre is open daily from 8 am to 10 pm. Appointments are not necessary. The centre handles approximately 17,000 visits every year.

Also located at UBC Hospital is the Brain Research Centre, a partnership of the UBC Faculty of Medicine and Vancouver Coastal Health Research Institute. The Brain Research Centre comprises more than 200 investigators with multidisciplinary expertise in neuroscience research ranging from the test tube, to the bedside, to industrial spin-offs.

The National Core for Neuroethics, a research-based facility, is also based at UBC Hospital.

=== GF Strong Rehab Centre ===
G.F. Strong Centre was part of VHHSC from 1995 to 2001. It is located in Vancouver's Fairview neighbourhood. It is British Columbia's largest rehabilitation centre and provides services in four main areas: acquired brain injury, spinal cord injury, arthritis and neuromusculoskeletal. It also has specialized programs for adolescents and young adults.

The centre opened in 1949 and was named after Dr. George Frederick Strong. It has about 800 employees.

=== George Pearson Centre ===
The George Pearson Centre was part of VHHSC from 1995 until 2001. Located in the Marpole neighbourhood in the south of Vancouver, is a home for 110-120 adults with severe disabilities. The centre opened in 1952 as a long-term care facility for tuberculosis patients and joined the VHHSC in 1995.

The Marpole Women's Auxiliary, established in 1938 to support the Marpole Infirmary which later moved to George Pearson Centre in 1965, continues to support the residents of the centre.
