= Oak Care Centre =

- Vancouver Coastal Health

Geography
- Location: Marpole, Vancouver, B.C., Canada
- Coordinates: 49.219041°N 123.120972°W

Organization
- Type: Residential Care

Services
- Beds: 119

History
- Founded: 1952

Oak Care Centre (formerly George Pearson Centre) is a long term residential care facility located in the Marpole neighbourhood of Vancouver, British Columbia, and is currently owned and operated by Vancouver Coastal Health. George Pearson Centre was initially named after former BC Minister of Health, George S. Pearson, and renamed in 2025. Built in 1952 to originally treat tuberculosis patients and then polio patients, in the 1960s the focus of George Pearson Centre changed to long term care for adults with disabilities.

Oak Care Centre now operates as a residential care facility. Care services are provided by Vancouver Coastal Health, food services were formerly privatized in 2003 and repatriated back into VCH as of 2024, housekeeping services to Compass Group Canada, laundry to K-Bro Linen.

== History ==
The 264-bed building originally opened on May 14, 1952, as George Pearson Tuberculosis Hospital to treat people with Tuberculosis (TB). The plans to build Pearson predated World War II but were delayed by the war. The cost of building was $1,800,000. The first patients arrived before the grand opening. On April 9, 1952, nine Japanese men arrived; they had been waiting seven years in a Japanese internment camp hospital for a bed. TB rates were declining due to advances in treatment and antibiotics. In 1955, the Polio Pavilion was added for polio patients. From 1963 to 1965 about 130 patients were transferred to Pearson Hospital from the nearby Marpole and Haney infirmaries. Marpole Infirmary building was condemned and Haney facility became a treatment centre for people with alcohol addiction. When these new patients came to George Pearson, they brought with them the Marpole Women's Auxiliary a charity that continues to donate to and support the residents who reside there today.

In 1966 the focus officially changed to long-term care, although since TB patients were not seen as long-term cases, the building was not built with permanent residents in mind. Other TB hospitals were closing including Coqualeetza TB hospital, formerly Canada's second largest residential school. Located near Chilliwack, Coqualeetza transferred their last TB patients to Pearson Hospital in Vancouver in 1968.

The 1970s saw an increase in spinal cord injuries resulting from traffic and recreational activities. Tuberculosis and polio were now considered far less of a public health threat. In May 1980 the Stan Stronge Pool opened.

There have been several owners/operators of this facility over the years. April 1984 the B.C. Government divested itself of Pearson Hospital, the province's last hospital. Pearson Hospital, along with G.F. Strong Rehabilitation Centre was now owned and operated by the Western Rehabilitation Society. In Aug 1989, the Western Rehabilitation Society was renamed BC Rehabilitation Society (BC Rehab) and Pearson Hospital was renamed George Pearson Centre.

BC Ministry of Health created the Vancouver Hospital and Health Sciences Centre (VHHSC) by merging Vancouver General Hospital and University of British Columbia (UBC) Hospital. In late 1997, G. F. Strong Centre and George Pearson Centre were merged into the VHHSC.

In 2001, the BC government created five health authorities including Vancouver Coastal Health Authority (later renamed to simply Vancouver Coastal Health) and George Pearson Centre came under the new health authority's management.

In 2025, the name changed to Oak Care Centre over concerns that the previous namesake, the British Columbia politician George Sharratt Pearson, stoked anti-Japanese sentiment during WWII.

== Residents of OCC ==
Adults of all ages live at Oak Care Centre from different places, and require care for many different reasons. Some people live at OCC for decades, while others live there for a short period of time.

Many residents have extensive physical disability and some require respiratory care including using a ventilator. Residents collaborated on creating a website, launched in 2010. OCC celebrated its 60th anniversary in 2012 with a 1950s themed party and an Open House. Past residents and staff returned to visit with those still living and working at OCC. A resident of OCC, Dan LeBlanc, had his own torch relay, after a medical emergency derailed his part in the 2010 Paralympic torch relay.

Over the years, people have raised concerns about living conditions at Oak Care Centre and institutional living in general.

== Features of OCC ==
The Stan Stronge Pool is a therapeutic pool attached to OCC, used by both OCC residents and community members. It is a heated swimming pool with ramps and hoists that allow complete access for people with disabilities, many who cannot use public swimming pools.

Farmers on 57th is a community group that started Community Gardens and a small productive farm in 2009, sponsored by the BC Coalition of People with Disabilities (BCCPD) now known as Disability Alliance of BC (DABC), on the VCH-owned site where Oak Care Centre is located. Clown Doctors have worked with residents of Oak Care Centre since May 2009, with Jest for Joy. The program is modeled after the Fools for Health program in Windsor. Since the 1960s, the Marpole Women's Auxiliary has raised funds to benefit the residents of OCC.

== Redevelopment ==
In April 2009, the City of Vancouver approved a planning process for VCH to consult with the community and stakeholders on the redevelopment of the 10-hectare (25.4 acre) land on which both Oak Care Centre and neighbouring seniors home Dogwood Lodge are located.

The process was delayed and began in late 2012. A series of Open Houses were held jointly by VCH and the City of Vancouver as part of the public consultation process. The land value is estimated to be over 100 million dollars. When the policy proposal went to Vancouver City Council for approval in January 2013, it was referred for further discussion in response to the many people who spoke out against the plan. Concerns were raised by the City's own Persons with Disabilities Advisory Committee as well as community members and disability rights advocates. Several representatives of the groups bringing concerns forward met with VCH planners and a revised policy plan was agreed upon by most parties. It was approved by Vancouver City Council on Feb 5, 2014 and moved onto the next stages of planning.

While in 2013 about 230 people live on the Pearson-Dogwood 25 acre land, estimates of the future population of this site range up to six thousand people and in buildings up to 28 stories high. As the planning process went on, concern grew about the planned increase in density.
