= Marpole Women's Auxiliary =

Marpole Women's Auxiliary is a charity in Vancouver, British Columbia that supports residents at Oak Care Centre (formerly George Pearson Centre until 2025) and G. F. Strong Centre. It was established in 1938 to support The Marpole Infirmary, located in an area of Vancouver referred to as Marpole.

== History ==
In 1938, when Miss. C.M. Motherwell took over as Matron of the Marpole Infirmary, she was appalled at the dressing conditions and low morale that existed. Realizing the pressing need for an auxiliary to help alleviate these conditions, she invited Mesdames Rose, Woodward, Grinnell and Strong to have lunch at the Infirmary and it was during this Luncheon that Marpole Women's Auxiliary was born.

These four women invited friends to join and were amazed at the interest and enthusiastic response they encountered. Miss Motherwell served as the guiding light and moving spirit in their endeavours. Mrs. Strong served as the first president and a quotation from her 1938-41 report sums up better than anything just how dedicated these early pioneers were:

"Many times while at the home I felt I couldn't take it - then I would see Miss Motherwell's cheeriness
and serenity and felt that if she could take it day after day we certainly could carry on. It has
been gratifying beyond words to watch a mental attitude of liveliness and interest begin to take the
place of the patient's previous apathy, and their appreciation for the things we have done has been
expressed in many ways, not so much in words as by the pressure of the hand or a look. It is hard
to see so many things crying to be done - our exchequer is definitely not up to the requirements but
with patience and hard work we will eventually make this place - maybe not a haven but a better place
to be in."

For many years, the new president was announced in the newspaper in May, along with their upcoming year's budget and plans.

== Provincial Infirmary ==
The Provincial Infirmary had been established in 1937 to take care of those people who required institutional care for chronic diseases, many of an incurable nature, but who would not benefit from treatment offered in a general or special hospital. Patients came from all parts of the province and after being screened through the Vancouver General Hospital or Maple Ridge Hospital at Haney, BC were sent to one of three branches:

- Marpole Infirmary at Vancouver with 124 beds for both male and female ambulatory cases
- Allco Infirmary at Haney with 84 beds for ambulatory men
- Mount St. Mary Hospital in Victoria with 90 beds for both male and female bed cases. These beds were under contract from the Sisters of St. Anne and the Auxiliary did not extend aid to these patients.

== Marpole Infirmary ==
The building stood at the corner of Hudson and SW Marine Drive, then one of Vancouver's busiest suburban traffic centres. It was built in 1912 as a hotel and in 1917 was taken over by the Vancouver General Hospital as a home for incurables when wounded veterans were returning from World War I. The provincial Government took it over in 1923 as a temporary measure until a new institution could be built.

The building was most unsatisfactory in every way—dark, noisy and overcrowded. Bed patients could not see out the windows, there was no provision made for bed lamps and privacy was an unheard of luxury. Following a visit to the Infirmary in January, 1947, the Vancouver Province newspaper described it thus:

"There are a lot of things wrong with the Marpole Infirmary...the building is a firetrap and at a recent
fire drill it took thirty minutes to evacuate all the patients. There are no proper facilities for the
treatment of the patients. There is no resident doctor, no full-time physiotherapist, no dietician
no laboratory, no space to use what sketchy equipment is available. For treatment of all cases the infirmary
offers: one small medical room equipped with one infra-red and one ultra-violet ray lamp, a
circulex machine, one microscope, a sterilizer, a wooden examination table and a medical cabinet. There
is one bathroom for forty-four patients on the first floor, two for sixty on the second floor, three
for forty women patients on the top floor. It was stated a year ago that the Marpole Infirmary lacked
decent privacy for either living or dying on medical, economic and humanitarian grounds it should
be replaced."

== Allco Infirmary ==
Bad as the conditions were at Marpole, they were even worse at the Allco Infirmary at Haney. It consisted of a series of huts, once the logging camp of the Abernethy Lougheed Logging Company, and later used by the City of Vancouver as a relief camp for the medically unfit.

The Provincial Government took it over in 1935 and in 1942 it became a branch of the Provincial Infirmary. Men of all ages suffering from chronic or incurable ailments were sent out there away from family and friends and were provided with little else but shelter and food. There was a twenty-bed hospital unit for the more seriously handicapped but medical treatment and therapy were at a minimum. In January, 1947 a report described it best when she said "Surely one of Canada's strangest and most primitive hospitals".

== Marpole Women's Auxiliary 1946 presentation to the Government ==
The Government's neglect of these elderly and chronically sick people was perhaps understandable during the war years, but in 1946 the Auxiliary made personal representations and presented a brief to the Government describing the appalling conditions and asking for a new 500-bed institution to replace the scattered units then operating.

The presentation of this brief alerted the newspapers to the conditions in the infirmaries and there appeared a spate of editorials condemning the Government of this supposedly enlightened province for allowing these conditions to exist. The clamor became so insistent that finally some members in Victoria were moved to comment on the need for new facilities. One member went so far as to actually visit Marpole Infirmary and was visibly shaken by what he saw.

Early in the spring of 1947 the Minister of Finance announced that money had been set aside and plans were being drawn up for a new hospital but when the budget came down there was no mention of such funds or plans and there the matter rested.

Pearson Hospital (now Oak Care Centre) was built in 1952 for tuberculosis patients at first, then an extension was built for polio patients. It wasn't until May 1964 that the Allco patients were transferred to Pearson Hospital and those from the Marpole Infirmary in April of the following year.

== Oak Care Centre, formerly George Pearson Centre ==
The staff at Pearson Hospital were notified late in 1963 that the patients in the three infirmaries were now its responsibility. By April, 1965 all the patients had been transferred into Pearson and it was quite a task getting them all settled and getting the Marpole Infirmary staff and the Pearson Hospital staff working together harmoniously and efficiently. Some of the patients came to Pearson with some fear that they would not like their new surroundings, but in a very short time all of them settled down and appeared quite happy.

The next year presented quite a number of difficulties, as the Activity Wing had not been built and the Physiotherapy and Occupational Therapy Departments had insufficient working space. The Auxiliary was influential in obtaining the Activity Wing and this helped greatly in the care of extended care patients.

When the patients were transferred to Pearson from Allco and Marpole Infirmary, the Auxiliary moved to Pearson too. They started visiting people already living in Pearson which included the Polio Pavilion and Tuberculosis Wards, totaling 179 patients. Each week the Auxiliary would write letters, do small sewing jobs and generally aided in the patients comforts, especially those who had limited visitors. The visiting time each month averaged over 100 hours. Christmas was a very busy period for the Auxiliary. Each year a committee purchased and wrapped gifts to be placed beside each patients bed. Flowers were donated for the chapel, wards and Activity room.

The Marpole Women's Auxiliary continues to support residents at Oak Care Centre. The Auxiliary turned 87 years old in 2025 (70 years old in 2008).

== Bargain Mart ==
When the Auxiliary was formed in 1938 one of the major fund-raising programs was a rummage sale, named Bargain Mart in 1952. The countless hours of work accumulating items to sell from clothing to furniture, along with running the event proved to be successful. Bargain Mart was held in a hall on Broadway in April 1939, expanding to a fall bazaar in which tea and goods were sold.

One day sales were held annually in various halls throughout the city until 1949 when the then fifty members decided to pioneer. From the Federal Government they secured the use of a vacated cafe at the corner of Burrard and Pender. It was filthy but the members attacked it with brooms and mops and soon had it presentable. The sale was kept open for the months of February and March and the members worked under the most difficult conditions. It was very cold with much snow and ice and there was no light, heat or water in the building. City Hall was prevailed on to grant a license and a permit for one light in the sorting room which was big enough to accommodate two members at a time. One member brought a small coal and wood heater in and the Fire Marshall promptly threatened to close the building. Another visit to City Hall straightened this out and husbands were recruited to get down an hour before the doors opened to light the stove. The lack of water did not present too much of a problem as just a block up the street the YMCA offered adequate washroom facilities.

The day after the sale opened, it was discovered that during the night thieves had broken in and stolen all the good men's suits. The members rectified this situation promptly by raiding their husband's wardrobes.

The President appointed herself chief swamper and could be seen for days on end, attired in slacks and gumboots, shoveling snow from the sidewalk so the customers could be in. When the thaw came she made it her job to mop up the floor and wring out the merchandise, as the roof leaked in a multitude of places. One member had a station wagon and it was her duty to pick up the rummage. When a load provided too big for the station wagon, she borrowed the ambulance that was used to transport patients from Allco to Marpole. For lack of storage space, the rummage was kept in members' cars until there was room for it on the counters.

The next two years the sales lasted just two weeks and were held in the downtown area, but from then on they were held in the Marpole Infirmary where the patients loved the crowds and excitement. Again, there was no room for storage and garages and vacant stores in the area were rented for this purpose.

The Bargain Mart continued after the Auxiliary moved to Pearson Hospital.

This continued, eventually shrinking to a one day 'Mini Mart' by the 1980s.

From 1939 to 1971 Bargain Mart generated $298,551.23.

== Calendars ==
Calendar sales started in 1939 when 500 were ordered. In latter years 20,000 were ordered and sold. In 1969 the sale price of the calendar rose from 50 cents to 75 cents. From 1939 to 1971 Calendar sales generated $84,086.11.

== Marpole Women's Auxiliary Early Donations to Pearson Hospital ==
During the year 1965 the Auxiliary provided at least half of the Physiotherapy and Occupational Therapy equipment that was required and much of this was transferred to the Activity Wing when it opened in 1966. In addition to the above, four wheelchairs were provided and these were sturdy chairs with removable arm rests so that the patients could be moved to and from their beds fairly easily. The Auxiliary provided a fund of $400 to Dr. Stalker, which they replenished when necessary, and this was used for small urgent matters that came up from time to time such as film for pictures, movies of various events taking place, buying paper for Pearsonality monthly paper, urgent needs for patients, or a treat for all patients such as candies with meals on special occasions.

Over the years various services and much equipment has been provided by the Auxiliary for use of patients, such as:

- In 1965 a hairdressing service was arranged for women patients. It was a morale builder and appreciated.
- In 1967 electric wheel chairs were provided, six to begin with, and during the next year one or two extra were added.
- In 1967 a stand-alone was obtained.
- A shuffle board for the Polio patients was also provided in 1967.
- A portable stereo record player was obtained and placed in the care of the Librarian to be loaned to patients for a week or ten days at a time.
- The bus to hold 16 patients in wheelchairs was the main budget item in 1968 and although there was some delay in its arrival, when it did come it provided a unique and delightful service.
- A washer, dryer and iron were provided in 1968 and were used for washing hoist slings and other small items which were difficult to send to the laundry.
- Washer-dryer machines for the patients were bought in 1969 along with a Kromayer Ultra Violet water-cooled lamp that was used for small wounds or sores in areas difficult to get at, particularly bed sores.
- An organ for entertainment.
- In 1969 seven colour television sets were donated.
- Alternating pressure mattresses were donated for use in special cases.
- Three or four combination wheelchair stretchers were donated in 1970 and were very useful for patients so weak that they required much help in transferring from their beds.
- A heavy duty electric typewriter was provided for the Occupational Therapy Department and proved so useful that a second one was added in 1970.
- Christmas menus are provided for the patients and the Auxiliary donated $75 each year to the Staff Christmas Coffee Break.

== GF Strong Rehabilitation Centre History ==
The G.F. Strong Centre was incorporated in 1947, as a non-profit organization, under the Societies Act of British Columbia. The objectives of the Society, as set out in its Constitution, are broad and far reaching, with the primary purpose of the Society being the building, equipping and operating of a rehabilitation centre for disabled children and adults.

It was the vision, leadership and untiring effort of the late Dr. George Frederick Strong that were largely responsible for the formation of this Society and the development of the Rehabilitation Centre.

The Society was governed by a representative board of sixteen directors. A formal Medical Staff Organization was established in 1969 replacing the Medical Advisory Committee, which had been in existence since the inception of the Centre.

The first unit (Unit 1)of the Centre opened in 1949 at a cost of $200,000 to build and equip the facility providing specially designed and equipped living accommodations for 13 patients. The funding was obtained entirely from private philanthropy and service clubs. The facilities and services provided by Unit 1 demonstrated the value and need for community rehabilitation services, which resulted in subsequent grants being received from the Provincial and Federal Governments toward the cost of building and equipping Units 2,3 and 4. Private individuals, companies and service clubs also contributed very generously to the cost of building these three other units.

The Centre provided a program of physical, psychological, social, recreational and vocational rehabilitation. The children's program included four academic schoolrooms staffed by the Vancouver School Board, and a visiting teacher was available to assist older children who were on correspondence courses. Although extensive vocational training services were not available in the Centre, suitable arrangements were made whereby vocational training was obtained as required through Vancouver Vocational Institute and other vocational schools and resources.

In keeping with its goal of maintaining the highest standards of service possible, the Centre was accredited in 1969 by the Commission on Accreditation of Rehabilitation Facilities. The Centre was the first rehabilitation facility to be accredited in Canada by the Commission which uses standards specifically researched and developed for rehabilitation facilities.

== Marpole Women's Auxiliary Early Donations to GF Strong Rehab Centre ==
In the period from 1949 to 1970 inclusive, the Auxiliary contributed over $180,000 to the Centre:

- When the Centre opened, there was an immediate need to provide transportation for patients to and from their homes. The Auxiliary paid the salary of a driver and the maintenance of the vehicle until the Centre was able to absorb this operating cost.
- Over the years the Auxiliary provided the funds to trade in the Centre's station wagon.
- When Units 1 and 2 were constructed, the Auxiliary provided the furnishings for the lounge and three bedrooms.
- The Auxiliary gave strong support in the payment of fees and in the purchase of appliances for patients. This support not only provided direct financial assistance, but also established the basis and acceptance of a sponsorship program which now embraces a number of other agencies.
- The rental of films, for which the Auxiliary paid as much as $600 per year. When the introduction of television lessened the need for movies, the Auxiliary provided a large television and paid for its subsequent maintenance and periodic replacement.
- The Occupational Therapy Department's training kitchen for assessment and training of disabled homemakers in a realistic setting: $2,000.
- When it was necessary to establish a driver-training program in conjunction with one of the professional driver-training schools, a grant from the Auxiliary guaranteed the operation of the program for a year. This driver-training program was a direct benefit to many patients, but of equal importance, it established an invaluable relationship with the Motor Vehicle Branch. This resulted in an improvement to the regulations, which benefited all disabled drivers.
- Many of the Centre's patients were without funds and their needs were financed by sponsoring agencies of which Marpole Women's Auxiliary is one.
- Funding for an outside play area.
- The Auxiliary made significant contributions to ensure the best equipment possible was available to: medical service, nursing service, physiotherapy, occupational therapy, speed therapy, gymnasium and brace shop.
- In 1959 the Auxiliary provided the funds for a physician to take a year's resident training in the Centre in physical medicine and rehabilitation.
- $1,300 grant was provided to the Centre to produce two films on rehabilitation for teaching purposes.
- 1970 a grant was given to establish a recreation program involving the employment of a director of recreation and part-time assistants.
- In addition to all of the foregoing, the Auxiliary sponsors a wide range of individual patient needs, such as wheelchairs, clothing, self-care devices and other requirements.

== Twenty-first century ==
In 2014, aligning a partnership with the UBC and VGH Hospital Foundation, Marpole Women’s Auxiliary purchased a wheelchair bus for residents of then-named George Pearson Centre. Residents with the most severe disability cannot use public transit nor Handy Dart; this bus allows residents to maintain a connection to their community. There are 5 to 6 community outings a week and sometimes 3 outings per day with an average of twenty residents taking part in the community outing program each week.

As a site of Vancouver Coastal Health Authority, Oak Care Centre receives funding for staffing, major equipment, etc.. Resident’s basic needs such as nursing care, food and shelter are provided for by the health authority. There is no budget for leisure and social programs. All funds supporting these programs come from Marpole Women’s Auxiliary. These programs have a huge impact on quality of life for residents of Oak Care Centre.

If Community Grants, through Marpole Women’s Auxiliary, were not received, residents would be required to cover costs for in-centre programs and community outings. For example: community outings, residents would be forced to pay for all their own admission fees, as well as, volunteers and staff. In the Artworks Studio program, Music Therapy, BBQ Events and Gardening Club, residents would pay for all of their own supplies. Memorials, birthdays and special holiday themed events for resident’s family, friends and surrounding community would not be available. Residents have very limited financial resources and consequences of not receiving Community Gaming Grants would result in residents’ non-participation or dramatically reduced involvement in the community and in-centre programs because they would not be able to afford it.

More than half of the residents of Oak Care Centre are on a $274.00 a month “comforts allowance” leaving very little or no money available each month for involvement in leisure programs and social activities either in the community or at OCC.

Through Community Gaming Grants, partnerships have been developed with many different community agencies including, Farmers on 57th garden group, DIGA (Disabled Independent Gardeners Association), local schools (Langara College, Churchill High School, Sir Wilfrid Laurier Elementary School), Rotary Club, CARMA (Community and Residents Mentoring Association), Disability Alliance of BC & Van Dusen Gardens Master Gardener program.

Marpole Women's Auxiliary first received Community Gaming Grants in 1998 when a portion of revenues from an assigned Casino from one night was given to a charity, which was $40,496.85. Selected members were required to be present to observe cash counting during the night through to close of business which was 3 am. In subsequent years this was not required, a grant proposal was reviewed by Community Gaming. In 2010 there were no Grants issued. This year British Columbia hosted the Olympics.

2023 Marpole Women's Community Gaming Account was closed when Grant requested was denied and appeal denied for Fiscal Year 2023. The Membership thanks Community Gaming for 25 years of support which enhanced lives that are riddled with chronic, debilitating and complicated medical issues.

From 1998 to 2023 Marpole Women's Auxiliary received $1,059,896.85 from Community Gaming Grants for programs supporting residents at George Pearson Center.

=== Redevelopment ===
Oak Care Centre was sold to developer Onni, and will be closed in 7 to 30 years. Sixty of the residents will be moving into the community within 3 years. Community Grants will play a crucial role in helping residents prepare for, and transition into, living in the community. Many of the residents have been institutionalized for years and will need much support through this process. They will need to increase their awareness of available community resources. They will need practice and education around accessing these community resources. As an example – many have not had to do their own shopping or banking for years. These folks will need to develop the confidence and skills to do this on their own prior to leaving OCC. Some residents will need practice in accessing and being comfortable on public transit. All of this will be facilitated by actually taking the residents on trips into the community. Community Grants will support all of these initiatives and make the likelihood of success in the community much greater.

Knowing OCC will be closing is very stressful for many residents; residents who have made OCC their home for 20, 30 and 40 years, Marpole Women’s Auxiliary’s Leisure and Social Wellness programs supported by Community Grants will make this experience less traumatic while transitioning into their new independent community.

Now, more than ever, residents of OCC will benefit from Community Grants support. The next few years will be a turning point in all of their lives.

== Current Board ==
- President – V. Mason, member since 2000
- Vice President – S. Alston, member since 1985
- Treasurer – M. Dixon, member since 1996
- Recording Secretary – M. Dixon, member since 1996
- Corresponding Secretary – C. Knowlend, member since 2009
