= Vancouver Prostate Centre =

Research centre in Vancouver, British Columbia, Canada

- Formation: 1998
- Type: Cancer Research
- Headquarters: Vancouver, British Columbia
- Executive Director: Dr. Martin Gleave
- Director of Development & Supportive Care: Dr. Larry Goldenberg
- Chief Operating Officer: Dr. Graeme Boniface
- Parent organization: Vancouver Coastal Health, University of British Columbia
- Staff: 250
- Website: Vancouver Prostate Centre
- Formerly called: The Prostate Centre at VGH

The Vancouver Prostate Centre (VPC) is a prostate cancer translational research centre located in Vancouver, British Columbia. It is a UBC and VGH Centre of Excellence and a designated national Centre of Excellence for Commercialization and Research. The VPC is hosted by the Vancouver Coastal Health Research Institute and the Department of Urologic Sciences, Faculty of Medicine, University of British Columbia.

The VPC's research laboratory was initially located in the Jack Bell Research Centre on the Vancouver General Hospital campus. In 2011, the Centre expanded its research laboratories into the Robert Hung-Ngai Ho Research Centre, a newly built adjoining building which also houses the Ovarian Cancer Research Program - OVCARE and the Centre for Hip Health and Mobility.

== Founding ==
Drs. Larry Goldenberg, Paul Rennie, Martin Gleave and Colleen Nelson founded the VPC (then called The Prostate Centre at VGH) in 1998. In 1999, the Centre was aided with a $20 million donation by Vancouver businessman Jim Pattison (the largest private donation ever made to a health care facility in Canada), a VGH and UBC Hospital Foundation $45 million campaign for matching funds, and a $10 million grant from Health Canada.

Research at the VPC is funded via peer-reviewed research grant awards and philanthropic support from the VGH and UBC Hospital Foundation.
