= Wallace B. Chung =

- Born: November 1, 1925 (age 100); Victoria, British Columbia, Canada
- Education: McGill University (MD)
- Spouse: Madeline Huang (m. 1953; died 2021)
- Children: 2
- Medical career
- Profession: Surgeon
- Institutions: Vancouver General Hospital; University of British Columbia
- Sub-specialties: Vascular surgery

Wallace Bakfu Chung (born November 1, 1925) is a Canadian retired surgeon and academic.

Born in Victoria, British Columbia in 1925 into a Chinese-Canadian family, Chung attended Victoria College and UBC before earning his medical degree from McGill University in 1953. Specializing in vascular surgery and stroke surgery techniques, he served as the head of the department of surgery at Vancouver General Hospital and UBC Hospital from 1980 to 1991. He was appointed as a professor of surgery at UBC in 1972.

In 1953, he married Madeline Huang, who was one of the first Chinese-Canadian female obstetrician-gynecologists. They had two children.

He was appointed as a member of the Order of Canada in 2005. In 2018, he was named to the Vancouver Medical, Dental and Allied Staff Association (VMDAS) Hall of Honour. Chung is also a prominent collector of historical artefacts, particularly related to Chinese-Canadian history, the Canadian Pacific Railway and Canadian Pacific steamships. He donated over 25,000 items to the UBC Library which comprise the Wallace B. Chung and Madeline H. Chung Collection. He also was involved in the Vancouver Chinese Cultural Centre and Canadian Multiculturalism Council.
