= Martin Gleave =

Canadian surgeon and cancer researcher

Martin E. Gleave is a Canadian urologic surgeon, physician-scientist, and cancer researcher. He is a Distinguished Professor and Head of the Department of Urologic Sciences at the University of British Columbia (UBC), British Columbia Leadership Chair in Prostate Cancer Research, and co-founder of the Vancouver Prostate Centre. He is internationally recognized for research on molecular mechanisms of treatment resistance in prostate cancer and for the development of targeted therapeutics that have advanced into late-phase clinical trials. In 2017, he was appointed a Member of the Order of Canada for contributions to prostate cancer research and therapy.

== Early life and education ==
Gleave was born in Toronto, Ontario, on February 22, 1959, the second-oldest son of Peter and Muriel Gleave.

In 1977, his family relocated to Vancouver, British Columbia. Gleave enrolled at the University of British Columbia (UBC), where he completed an undergraduate degree in Physical Education. He entered the UBC Faculty of Medicine in 1980 and graduated with a Doctor of Medicine degree in 1984. While at UBC, he competed in varsity wrestling for five years and was a two-time Canadian university wrestling champion. In 1983, he was awarded the Bobby Gaul Trophy as UBC's Male Athlete of the Year.

Following medical school, Gleave completed a rotating internship at St. Michael's Hospital in Toronto in 1985. He then returned to UBC for residency training in urology, which he completed in 1989. He subsequently undertook a three-year fellowship in urologic oncology at the University of Texas MD Anderson Cancer Center in Houston under the mentorship of Andrew von Eschenbach and Leland Chung. In 1992, he returned to Vancouver and married his wife Tracey Henry, and together they raised their two children, Anna and James.

== Academic and clinical career ==
Gleave returned to the University of British Columbia (UBC) in 1992 to begin his academic career as an assistant professor of surgery. He progressed through academic ranks to Full Professor and has held clinical appointments at Vancouver General Hospital and BC Cancer. He was appointed Distinguished University Scholar in 2003 and named British Columbia Leadership Chair in Prostate Cancer Research in 2005.

In 2015, Gleave became Head of the Department of Urologic Sciences at UBC, a role he continues to hold, with responsibility for academic, clinical, and research programs across the department. He has also served as Director of the Vancouver Prostate Centre since 2006 and, more recently, as inaugural Chief Scientific Officer of the M. H. Mohseni Institute of Urologic Sciences.

== Vancouver Prostate Centre and entrepreneurship ==
In 1998, Gleave co-founded the Vancouver Prostate Centre (VPC), which developed into a national and international centre of excellence in translational prostate cancer research. He served as executive director of the VPC from 2006 to 2024, during which time the centre expanded its integration of laboratory science, clinical trials, and commercialization.

Gleave has co-founded multiple biotechnology companies, including OncoGenex Pharmaceuticals, Sitka Biopharma, and Sustained Therapeutics. OncoGenex Pharmaceuticals was named Canadian Biotech Company of the Year in 2010.

== Research ==
Gleave's research focuses on adaptive stress responses, lineage plasticity, and genomic alterations that mediate resistance to cancer therapies, particularly in prostate cancer. Early in his career, he helped develop in vivo models that mimic the progression to castration-resistant prostate cancer, which have been widely adopted in preclinical research. He later contributed to the generation of patient-derived xenograft models, including early models of treatment-induced neuroendocrine prostate cancer, which informed seminal studies of disease evolution.

His laboratory identified clusterin as a stress-induced survival protein involved in resistance to hormone therapy and chemotherapy, leading to the development of the antisense inhibitor custirsen (OGX-011), which advanced into global Phase III clinical trials. He also led development of apatorsen (OGX-427), targeting heat shock protein 27 (Hsp27), which demonstrated biological and clinical activity in Phase I and II trials. Additional work has addressed androgen receptor signaling, epigenetic reprogramming, autophagy, tumor–microenvironment interactions, and biomarker-driven approaches to treatment selection.

== Honours and awards ==
Gleave was appointed a Member of the Order of Canada in 2017 for leadership in developing new treatments for prostate cancer and for advancing understanding of mechanisms underlying treatment resistance in cancer. He was elected a Fellow of the National Academy of Inventors in 2020.

His major awards include the Huggins Medal from the Society of Urologic Oncology, the Richard D. Williams Prostate Cancer Research Excellence Award and the Eugene Fuller Triennial Award from the American Urological Association, the Barringer Medal from the American Association of Genitourinary Surgeons, the Aubrey J. Tingle Prize, and the Dr. Chew Wei Memorial Prize in Cancer Research. In 2023, he received the Doctors of BC Terry Fox Medal.

== Selected publications ==
- Gleave ME, Hsieh JT, Gao C, von Eschenbach AC, Chung LW. "Acceleration of human prostate cancer growth in vivo by factors produced by prostate and bone fibroblasts." ''Cancer Research'' 51(14):3753–3761 (1991).
- Gleave ME et al. "In vivo models that mimic the course of castration-resistant prostate cancer." ''Cancer Research'' 52:1598–1605 (1992).
- Beltran H et al. "Divergent clonal evolution of castration-resistant neuroendocrine prostate cancer." ''Cancer Discovery'' 1(6):487–495 (2011).
- Zhang F et al. "Clusterin is a novel autophagy adaptor protein that promotes cancer cell survival under stress." ''Nature Communications'' (2015).
- Gleave ME, Monia BP. "Antisense therapy for cancer." ''Nature Reviews Cancer'' 5(6):468–479 (2005).
- Wyatt AW et al. "Concordance of circulating tumor DNA and matched metastatic tissue biopsy in prostate cancer." ''Journal of the National Cancer Institute'' 109(12):djx118 (2017).
- Rocchi P et al. "Heat shock protein 27 increases after androgen ablation and plays a cytoprotective role in hormone-refractory prostate cancer." ''Cancer Research'' 64(18):6595–6602 (2004).
- Gleave ME et al. "Randomized comparative study of 3 versus 8-month neoadjuvant hormonal therapy before radical prostatectomy: biochemical and pathological effects." ''The Journal of Urology'' 166(2):500–507 (2001).
- Chi KN et al. "A phase I pharmacokinetic and pharmacodynamic study of OGX-011, a 2′-methoxyethyl antisense oligonucleotide to clusterin, in patients with localized prostate cancer." ''Journal of the National Cancer Institute'' 97(17):1287–1296 (2005).
