= Stéphane Grenier =

Stéphane Grenier may refer to

- Stéphane Grenier (soldier), Canadian-French officer
- Stéphane Grenier (tennis) (born 1968), French former tennis player
