= OGX =

OGX or .ogx may refer to:

- Dommo Energia, formerly OGX, a Brazilian oil and natural gas company that is controlled by the conglomerate EBX Group
- .ogx, an audio/video file format, see Ogg
- OGX-011, or custirsen sodium, an anti-cancer drug
- Ain Beida Airport, in Ouargla, Algeria, by IATA code
- Ogden Express, a bus rapid transit line in Ogden, Utah
