= Roger Hayward Rogers =

Canadian medical doctor (1928–2011)

Roger Hayward Rogers (February 6, 1928 – November 22, 2011) was a Canadian medical doctor and co-founder of the Centre for Integrated Healing (now known as InspireHealth) in Vancouver, British Columbia. Rogers specialized in exploring alternative treatment possibilities for people with cancer who had not responded to conventional treatment. He worked in family practice for over thirty years and taught medical students as a Clinical Associate Professor Emeritus at the University of British Columbia. In 2001, Dr. Rogers was appointed to the Order of British Columbia for his pioneering work in alternative and complementary cancer care.

== Early life and education ==
Rogers was born in Vancouver, British Columbia. He was a graduate of the University of British Columbia (UBC) where he obtained a Bachelor of Arts degree in sociology and psychology, a Bachelor's degree in Social Work, and a Doctorate of Medicine in 1959.

== Career ==
Rogers opened his medical practice in East Vancouver in 1960. After attending a conference of the American Holistic Medicine Association, in the 1970s he opened a centre for holistic medicine with Robert Boese in an apartment near Vancouver General Hospital. This was later registered as a non-profit society, the Thera Wellness Centre.

In 1969, he was invited to join the Faculty of Medicine at UBC where he taught for the next 23 years. During that time he developed a model of integrated cancer care and treatment which was later adopted as standard practice by the province of British Columbia.

== Legacy ==
Every two years the $250,000 Dr. Rogers Prize is presented in his name to a researcher or provider of complementary medicine.
