= Amina Zoubeidi =

Canadian research scientist and urologist

Academic background
- Education: Bsc, Mohammed V University; M.Sc. Université du Québec à Montréal; PhD, Université de Montréal

Amina Zoubeidi is a Canadian research scientist and prostate cancer researcher. She's a scientist at the Vancouver Coastal Health Research Institute and a professor in the Department of Urologic Sciences at the University of British Columbia. During her tenure at UBC, Zoubeidi and her research team developed the first drug that targets and blocks BRN2, thus stopping Neuroendocrine prostate cancer (NEPC) tumours and creating a possible treatment for the previously thought incurable disease.

== Early life and education ==
Zoubeidi earned her Bachelor of Science degree from the Mohammed V University before moving to Montreal to earn her graduate degrees from the Université du Québec à Montréal and Université de Montréal.

== Career ==
Zoubeidi joined the Department of Urologic Sciences at the University of British Columbia as an assistant professor in 2010. In the same year, she was also the recipient of a Prostate Cancer Foundation Durden Foundation Young Investigator Award to fund her research on determining the function of Hsp27 in cancer treatment. She continued her research into Hsp27 and received funding from the Michael Smith Career Investigator Award for her project Adaptive Stress Response Signaling Driving Treatment Resistance and Metastasis in Cancer.

While serving in her role as an assistant professor, in collaboration with Vancouver Coastal Health, Zoubeidi continued to search for a cure for prostate cancer and led her research team to numerous discoveries. Zoubeidi and her research team designed a mouse model of Neuroendocrine Prostate Cancer (NEPC) to identify that BRN2 was essential for NEPC to develop. She firstly used genome editing CRISPR technology to freeze the gene producing the protein driving the emergence of NPEC for the first time. Following this discovery, she earned a three-year Translation Acceleration Grant from Prostate Cancer Canada and Movember to fund a project to develop blockers of BRN2, a gene linked to the growth of aggressive NPEC. She subsequently became the first female scientist to earn a Translation Acceleration Grant from Prostate Cancer Canada and Movember and later earned the 2018 UBC Faculty of Medicine Distinguished Achievement Award.

By 2019, Zoubeidi and her research team developed the first drug that targets and blocks BRN2, thus stopping NEPC tumours and creating a possible treatment for the previously thought incurable disease. They also modified the drug so it could be tested in clinical trials on humans. Similarly, her project The role of the lineage oncogene ASCL1 in treatment-induced neuroendocrine prostate cancer received funding from the Canadian Institutes of Health Research. She was eventually promoted to the rank of Full professor as a result of her "contributions within the UBC community and her outstanding research career to date."
