= Larry Goldenberg =

Canadian medical researcher

S. Larry Goldenberg, CM OBC (born 1953) is a Canadian researcher in the field of medicine and a pioneer in the treatment of prostate cancer.

Goldenberg was born in Toronto, Ontario to survivors of the Holocaust who had immigrated to Canada after the Second World War. He completed his medical training at the University of Toronto in 1978. He is married to Paula Gordon, a pioneer in the diagnostic imaging of breast cancer and recipient of the Order of Canada. They have two sons. Goldenberg is currently Professor and Head of the Department of Urologic Sciences at the University of British Columbia. He holds adjunct faculty appointments at the BC Cancer Agency and the University of Washington, and is a past president of the American Urological Association, Western Section of the Canadian Urological Association, and the Northwest Urological Association.

== Honours ==
- 1984, named a Terry Fox Fellow of the Cancer Research Centre
- 2006, named a Fellow of the Canadian Academy of Health Sciences
- 2006, named to the Order of British Columbia
- 2008, awarded the Scopus Award of the Hebrew University of Jerusalem
- 2009, made a Member of the Order of Canada "for his contributions to prostate cancer research and treatment, as well as for promoting public awareness of the disease".
- 2016 awarded a lifetime achievement award from the Society Internationale d'Urologie
- 2016 awarded a lifetime achievement award from the Canadian Urological Association
- 2017 awarded the prestigious HUgh Hampton Young award of the American Urology Association
