= Stephen M. Drance =

Canadian ophthalmologist (1925–2020)

Stephen Michael Drance OC FRSC (22 May 1925 – 2 September 2020) was emeritus professor of ophthalmology at the University of British Columbia. He was the head of glaucoma service at the Eye Care centre of Vancouver General Hospital, Vancouver, BC, Canada

== Early life and education ==
Drance was born in Bielsko, Poland. In about 1937, his family send him to a boarding school in London, England. The school was bombed in an air raid, so his family opted to move him to Scotland, where there were large numbers of Polish military personnel. Drance finished his London Matriculation in Scotland. He decided to enrol in the Polish School of Medicine at the University of Edinburgh to study medicine. He switched to the university proper, completing his medical studies in 1948 and gaining his clinical diploma (MD) in 1949.

Drance performed two years of national service in a Royal Air Force hospital in Aden. He then returned to Britain, completing a diploma in ophthalmology in 1953 and a Fellowship of the Royal Colleges of Surgeons after working at York University, at the University of Edinburgh, and at Oxford University. At Oxford, he started doing research in ophthalmology.

== Career ==
In 1957, Drance moved to Canada, where he became an assistant professor at the University of Saskatchewan. In 1963 he became an associate professor at the University of British Columbia in Vancouver. It was at this university in 1966, that he gained the position of professor and in 1973 head of the Department of Ophthalmology, which he held until his retirement in 1990.

Drance published more than 300 papers on glaucoma over half a century and addressed every conceivable aspect of the disease, along with being the co-author of five books.

The Vancouver General Hospital Eye Care Centre was established in Vancouver in 1983 due to the eight million dollars Drance helped raise. For 18 years, he served as Chairman of the University of British Columbia's Department of Ophthalmology, and merged clinical care seamlessly into an environment of teaching and research.

Drance trained 35 fellows, whose contributions continue to move glaucoma care forward.

Drance's accomplishments have been widely recognized, through numerous honorary fellowships, honorary degrees, and awards. His expertise took him around the world. He was a visiting professor or guest lecturer across Canada and the United States as well as in Australia, New Zealand, France, Mexico, England, Panama, Germany, the Netherlands, Belgium, Japan, Poland, Italy, Greece, the Czech Republic and Hungary.

== Recognition ==
In 1987, Drance was appointed as an Officer of the Order of Canada, one of the highest honors his country bestows.

His passion for music and the visual arts led him to found the Vancouver Summer Festival, and in 2005 he received the Vancouver Arts Award in recognition of his philanthropy in the arts. In 2012, he was awarded the Queen Elizabeth II Diamond Jubilee Medal.
