= Clusterin =

Protein found in humans

CLU

Identifiers
- Aliases: CLU, AAG4, APO-J, APOJ, CLI, CLU1, CLU2, KUB1, NA1/NA2, SGP-2, SGP2, SP-40, TRPM-2, TRPM2, clusterin
- External IDs: OMIM: 185430; MGI: 88423; GeneCards: CLU

Gene location (Human)
| Chr. | Chromosome 8 (human) |
| Band | 8p21.1 | Start | 27,596,917 bp |
| Band | 8p21.1 | End | 27,614,700 bp |

Gene location (Mouse)
| Chr. | Chromosome 14 (mouse) |
| Band | 14 D1|14 34.36 cM | Start | 66,205,932 bp |
| Band | 14 D1|14 34.36 cM | End | 66,218,996 bp |
RNA expression pattern
| Bgee | Human / Mouse (ortholog); Top expressed in: external globus pallidus; Achilles tendon; paraflocculus of cerebellum; palpebral conjunctiva; optic nerve; Brodmann area 10; right uterine tube; middle frontal gyrus; Brodmann area 9; right testis / Top expressed in: iris; ciliary body; epithelium of lens; habenula; paraventricular nucleus of hypothalamus; dorsomedial hypothalamic nucleus; Epithelium of choroid plexus; dorsal tegmental nucleus; subiculum; ventral tegmental area; More reference expression data |
| BioGPS | n/a |
Gene ontology
| Molecular function | chaperone binding; misfolded protein binding; ATPase activity; protein binding; ubiquitin protein ligase binding |
| Cellular component | cytoplasm; apical dendrite; cytosol; Golgi apparatus; blood microparticle; mitochondrial membranes; membrane; extracellular matrix; neurofibrillary tangle; chromaffin granule; spherical high-density lipoprotein particle; extracellular region; cell surface; intracellular membrane-bounded organelle; mitochondrion; endoplasmic reticulum; extracellular exosome; platelet alpha granule lumen; nucleus; cytoplasmic vesicle; intracellular anatomical structure; perinuclear region of cytoplasm; extracellular space |
| Biological process | apoptotic process; central nervous system myelin maintenance; negative regulation of protein homooligomerization; response to misfolded protein; chaperone-mediated protein complex assembly; positive regulation of tau-protein kinase activity; lipid metabolism; immune system process; negative regulation of amyloid-beta formation; positive regulation of nitric oxide biosynthetic process; complement activation; response to virus; protein stabilization; platelet degranulation; positive regulation of neuron death; negative regulation of intrinsic apoptotic signaling pathway in response to DNA damage; positive regulation of neurofibrillary tangle assembly; microglial cell activation; protein import; intrinsic apoptotic signaling pathway; positive regulation of amyloid-beta formation; regulation of neuronal signal transduction; microglial cell proliferation; positive regulation of NF-kappaB transcription factor activity; positive regulation of ubiquitin-dependent protein catabolic process; cell morphogenesis; regulation of neuron death; complement activation, classical pathway; positive regulation of tumor necrosis factor production; positive regulation of apoptotic process; regulation of amyloid-beta clearance; innate immune response; positive regulation of intrinsic apoptotic signaling pathway; positive regulation of proteasomal ubiquitin-dependent protein catabolic process; release of cytochrome c from mitochondria; reverse cholesterol transport; chaperone-mediated protein folding; antimicrobial humoral response; cell death |
Sources:Amigo / QuickGO
Orthologs
| Databases | NCBI: entry; OMA: entry |
| Species | Human | Mouse |
| Entrez | 1191 | 12759 |
| Ensembl | ENSG00000120885 | ENSMUSG00000022037 |
| UniProt | P10909 | Q06890 |
| RefSeq (mRNA) | NM_001831 | NM_013492 |
| RefSeq (protein) | NP_001822 | NP_038520 |
| Location (UCSC) | Chr 8: 27.6 – 27.61 Mb | Chr 14: 66.21 – 66.22 Mb |
| PubMed search |
- Wikidata
| View/Edit Human | View/Edit Mouse |

Clusterin is a protein that in humans is encoded by the CLU gene on chromosome 8. CLU is an extracellular molecular chaperone which binds to misfolded proteins in body fluids to neutralise their toxicity and mediate their cellular uptake by receptor-mediated endocytosis. Once internalised by cells, complexes between CLU and misfolded proteins are trafficked to lysosomes where they are degraded. CLU is involved in many diseases including neurodegenerative diseases, cancers, inflammatory diseases, and aging.

== Structure ==
The CLU gene contains nine exons and a variety of mRNA isoforms can be detected, although most of these are only ever expressed at very low levels (< 0.3% of the total). The full-length mRNA encoding the secreted isoform is by far the dominant species transcribed. Secreted CLU (apolipoprotein J) is an approximately 60 kDa disulfide-linked heterodimeric glycoprotein which migrates in SDS-PAGE with an apparent molecular mass of 75-80 kDa. Mature CLU is composed of disulfide-linked α- and β-chains. Although multiple previous publications proposed the existence of N-terminally truncated CLU protein isoforms in different cell compartments, recent work has highlighted the lack of direct evidence for this and shown that the full-length CLU polypeptide, with variable levels of glycosylation (and hence variable apparent mass), can translocate from the ER/Golgi to the cytosol and nucleus during stress.

== Function ==
Clusterin was first identified in ram rete testis fluid where it was shown to elicit in vitro clustering of rat Sertoli cells and erythrocytes, hence its name.

CLU has functional similarities to members of the small heat shock protein family and is thus a molecular chaperone. Unlike most other chaperone proteins, which aid intracellular proteins, CLU is trafficked through the ER/Golgi before normally being secreted. Within the secretory system, CLU has been suggested to facilitate the folding of secreted proteins in an ATP-independent way. The gene is highly conserved in species, and the protein is widely distributed in many tissues and organs, where it been implicated in a number of biological processes, including lipid transport, membrane recycling, cell adhesion, programmed cell death, and complement-mediated cell lysis. Overexpression of secretory CLU can protect cells from apoptosis induced by cellular stress, such as chemotherapy, radiotherapy, or androgen/estrogen depletion. CLU has been suggested to promote cell survival by a number of means, including inhibition of BAX on the mitochondrial membrane, activation of the phosphatidylinositol 3-kinase/protein kinase B pathway, modulation of extracellular signal-regulated kinase (ERK) 1/2 signaling and matrix metallopeptidase-9 expression, promotion of angiogenesis, and mediation of the nuclear factor kappa B (NF-κB) pathway. Meanwhile, its downregulation allows for p53 activation, which then skews the proapoptotic:antiapoptotic ratio of present Bcl-2 family members, resulting in mitochondrial dysfunction and cell death. p53 may also transcriptionally repress secretory CLU to further promote the proapoptotic cascade.

== Clinical significance ==
=== Alzheimer's disease ===
Two independent genome-wide association studies identified a statistical association between a single-nucleotide polymorphism (SNP) in the CLU gene and the risk of developing Alzheimer's disease.

Subsequent studies found elevated clusterin (CLU) protein levels in the blood of individuals with Alzheimer's disease, and these levels were correlated with faster cognitive decline. However, increased CLU levels did not reliably predict the onset of the disease.

CLU may also play a role in other neurodegenerative diseases, such as Huntington disease.

=== Cancer ===
CLU has been implicated in multiple cancers through its role in promoting tumor cell survival and resistance to apoptosis. It facilitates the binding of BAX to Ku70, thereby preventing BAX from localizing to the outer mitochondrial membrane to initiate apoptosis.

In clear cell renal cell carcinoma, CLU regulates ERK1/2 signaling and matrix metallopeptidase-9 expression to promote tumor cell migration, invasion, and metastasis. In epithelial ovarian cancer, CLU enhances angiogenesis and chemoresistance. It is also involved in the PI3K/AKT/mTOR pathway and NF-κB pathway, further supporting cell survival and resistance to therapy. In contrast, CLU expression is downregulated in testicular seminoma, making these tumors more sensitive to chemotherapy. CLU has also been implicated in breast cancer, pancreatic cancer, hepatocellular carcinoma, and melanoma.

Due to its central role in tumor biology, CLU has been investigated as a therapeutic target. Inhibition of CLU enhances the efficacy of chemotherapeutic agents. One promising agent, custirsen, is an antisense oligonucleotide that targets CLU mRNA. It was shown to improve the activity of HSP90 inhibitors by suppressing the heat shock response in castration-resistant prostate cancer, and was evaluated in phase III trials.

==== Prostate ====
The CLU transcript — at that time designated testosterone-repressed prostate message-2 (TRPM-2) — was idenfied as the most highly overexpressed gene during castration-induced involution of the rat ventral prostate, through complete cDNA cloning and sequencing. This finding established CLU as a marker of androgen-dependent apoptotic regression and opened subsequent investigation into its role in human prostate carcinogenesis.

Subsequently it was demonstrated that CLU expression is systematically downregulated during progression of human prostate cancer. A meta-analysis of available microarray data showed that CLU mRNA is significantly downregulated in prostate tumor tissue compared to normal prostate in 14 out of 15 independent studies, supporting its classification as a tumor suppressor gene in this context. The tumor suppressor role of CLU has been extended to other cancer types, including colon, ovarian, and lung carcinoma and neuroblastoma.

The apparent contradictions in the literature regarding the pro- or anti-apoptotic role of CLU have been in part resolved by clarifying the existence of distinct protein isoforms with opposite functions: the secreted isoform (sCLU, approximately 60 kDa) has cytoprotective and anti-apoptotic properties, while a nuclear isoform (nCLU, lacking the signal peptide encoded by exon 2) exerts pro-apoptotic activity. This isoform-dependent duality is critical for interpreting experimental results across different model systems.

The tumor suppressor function of CLU in prostate cancer was confirmed in vivo using the TRAMP (Transgenic Adenocarcinoma of the Mouse Prostate) mouse model. TRAMP mice with homozygous deletion of CLU showed highly aggressive tumor development with earlier onset, a greater number of primary tumors, and poorly differentiated metastatic tumors compared to CLU-wild-type TRAMP controls.

A mechanistic connection between CLU and green tea catechins in prostate cancer chemoprevention was established by the same group: CLU expression was found to be restored in TRAMP mice responding to chemoprevention with green tea catechins, suggesting that EGCG exerts part of its chemopreventive activity through reactivation of CLU as a tumor suppressor. This observation was clinically relevant given the results of a randomized, double-blind, placebo-controlled trial demonstrating that oral administration of a standardized green tea catechin preparation (600 mg/day, 51.88% EGCG) for 12 months significantly reduced the incidence of prostate cancer in men with high-grade prostatic intraepithelial neoplasia (HG-PIN).

=== Infectious diseases ===
CLU is also involved in the host response to infection. In hepatitis C virus infection, CLU is upregulated in response to cellular stress and assists in viral assembly by stabilizing the viral core and NS5A proteins.

=== Other conditions ===
Beyond its roles in neurodegeneration, cancer, and infection, CLU has been associated with conditions related to oxidative stress, including aging, glomerulonephritis, atherosclerosis, and myocardial infarction.

== Interactions ==
CLU has been shown to interact with many different protein ligands and several cell receptors.
