= Paula Gordon =

Canadian radiologist

- Occupation: Radiologist
- Title: Clinical Professor of Radiology
- Awards: Order of Canada (2023), Order of British Columbia (2013)

Academic work
- Institutions: University of British Columbia
- Notable ideas: Use of ultrasound for breast cancer screening

Paula Gordon is a Canadian radiologist and medical researcher specializing in breast cancer. She is a Clinical Professor in the Department of Radiology at the University of British Columbia.

Gordon is best known academically for her 1995 paper in The Cancer Journal, demonstrating for the first time that ultrasound could be used to find cancers missed on mammograms in women with dense breasts. Her paper attracted the attention of cancer researchers and has been cited in more than 200 academic works.

In addition to research and teaching work, she was appointed to a number of positions in public health. She has been the Chair of the Early Detection Committee of the Canadian Breast Cancer Foundation (BC/Yukon Division), Chair of the Academic Committee of the Screening Mammography Program of British Columbia, and co-chair of the Workforce Committee of the Provincial Breast Health Strategy. She has also been a member of the Steering and Prevention Committees of the Provincial Breast Health Strategy, the Provincial Radiology Expert Committee, the Provincial Screening Policy Review Committee and the BC Breast Imaging Services Working Group. As of 2023, she is a member of the board of the Canadian Society of Breast Imaging, of which she is also a founding member.

In her public education role, she advocates for early screening of breast cancer using appropriate techniques, favouring yearly examinations for women exposed to a greater risk of developing breast cancer (such as dense breasts and Ashkenazi) as early as 40 years old.

She published some 35 articles on medical journals and gave some 300 lectures to medical professionals.

She volunteers as Medical Advisor to Dense Breasts Canada and DenseBreast-Info.org, and as Director on the Board of the Canucks for Kids Fund.

== Honours ==
- Killam Teaching Prize (University of British Columbia), 2010-2011
- Order of British Columbia (2013)
- Order of Canada (2023)

== Selected publications ==
- Yong-Hing, Charlotte Jane; Gordon, Paula; Appavoo, Shushiela; Fitzgerald, Sabrina R. (September 2022). "Addressing Misinformation About the Canadian Breast Screening Guidelines". Canadian Association of Radiologists Journal. 74 (2): 388–397. doi:10.1177/08465371221120798. PMID 36048585.
- Gordon, Paula; Yen, Peggy P.W.; Dumas, Sandra; Albert, Marianne (February 2018). "Post–Vacuum-Assisted Stereotactic Core Biopsy Clip Displacement: A Comparison Between Commercially Available Clips and Surgical Clip". Canadian Association of Radiologists Journal. 69 (1): 10–15. doi:10.1016/j.carj.2017.08.004. PMID 29458952. S2CID 3624405.
- Zhang, Charlie; Gordon, Paula; Sutton, Roger; Lenton, Brian (March 2013). "Proximal Femoral Changes Related to Bisphosphonate Use and Looser Zones in Hypophosphatemic Osteomalacia: Dual-Energy X-Ray Absorptiometry Findings". Journal of Clinical Densitometry. 16 (3): 380–383. doi:10.1016/j.jocd.2013.01.008. PMID 23473957.
- Gordon, Paula; Borugian, Marilyn; Warren Burhenne, Linda J. (December 2007). "A True Screening Environment for Review of Interval Breast Cancers: Pilot Study to Reduce Bias 1". Radiology. 245 (2): 411–5. doi:10.1148/radiol.2451061798. PMID 17848684.
- Gordon, Paula; Goldenberg, Larry (15 August 1995). "Malignant breast masses detected only by ultrasound. A retrospective review". Cancer. 76 (4): 626–630. doi:10.1002/1097-0142(19950815)76:4<626::AID-CNCR2820760413>3.0.CO;2-Z. PMID 8625156. S2CID 29951255 – via Wiley.
