= Operational stress injury =

Operational stress injury or OSI is a non-clinical, non-medical term referring to a persistent psychological difficulty caused by traumatic experiences or prolonged high stress or fatigue during service as a military member or first responder. The term does not replace any individual diagnoses or disorders, but rather describes a category of mental health concerns linked to the particular challenges that these military members or first responders encounter in their service. There is not yet a single fixed definition. The term was first conceptualized within the Canadian Armed Forces to help foster understanding of the broader mental health challenges faced by military members who have been impacted by traumatic experiences and who face difficulty as a result. OSI encompasses a number of the diagnoses found in the Diagnostic and Statistical Manual of Mental Disorders (DSM) classification system, with the common thread being a linkage to the operational experiences of the afflicted. The term has gained traction outside of the military community as an appropriate way to describe similar challenges suffered by those whose work regularly exposes them to trauma, particularly front line emergency first responders such as but not limited to police, firefighters, paramedics, correctional officers, and emergency dispatchers. The term, at present mostly used within Canada, is increasingly significant in the development of legislation, policy, treatments and benefits in the military and first responder communities.

== History ==
Military members experiencing wartime trauma may suffer debilitating psychological effects from their experiences, and historical research has found literary references to these psychological packs throughout recorded history. During the First World War era, psychological symptoms suffered by soldiers in war came to be referred to as "shell shock". This progressed by the Second World War to being called "battle fatigue", or "combat stress reaction". As research continued and the understanding of psychology and psychiatry advanced, it gradually became more understood through the 20th century that experiencing trauma could have a variety of psychological and emotional impacts that were genuinely medical in nature. Increasingly, research focused on developing clinical definitions and exploring options for treatments and therapies. The term 'posttraumatic stress disorder' (PTSD), was developed for inclusion in the DSM-III in the 1980s. While not a condition limited to those who had experienced wartime trauma, PTSD is often associated with soldiers returning from wartime.

In 2001, Canadian Forces Lieutenant Colonel Stéphane Grenier coined the term 'Operational stress injury' to describe a mental or emotional injury suffered by soldiers in the course of their service. The term was designed to expand the understanding of mental health disorders related to service beyond just PTSD, and to include other clinical diagnoses linked to trauma. The word 'injury' was chosen to help shift the view of these disorders in order to extend to them the same legitimacy in discourse as physical injuries, and to help reduce the stigma surrounding mental health. Not a diagnosis itself, operational stress injury was described by the Canadian Forces as a “grouping of diagnoses that are related to injuries that occur as part of operations", most commonly PTSD, major depression, and generalized anxiety.

By 2016, the Canadian Parliamentary Standing Committee on Public Safety and National Security recognized OSIs as an issue faced by all first responder organizations, not just the military. As of late 2016, the Parliament of Canada is exploring a national strategy to address OSIs within the various public safety professions. The term does not as of yet have any regular use outside of Canada.

== Commonly included diagnoses ==
The concept of operational stress injury is still emerging and evolving, and does not as of yet have a commonly accepted fixed definition. Research within the Canadian military has nonetheless identified several disorders most commonly associated with traumatic service-related experiences, and which have generally been accepted as included in the term. The same psychiatric conditions are the subject of considerable study and public policy discussion among the first responder professions. Two or more of these diagnoses may be comorbid, and comorbidity may also exist with physical injuries or illnesses.

=== Posttraumatic stress disorder ===
Posttraumatic stress disorder, or PTSD, is among the most common individual diagnoses linked to traumatic exposure in military or first responder service. PTSD is related to anxiety disorders, and is linked to the intrusive and unwanted re-experiencing of traumatic events. Those suffering from PTSD will often seek to avoid and may be triggered by stimuli that cause recollection of their traumatic exposures. Symptoms may include inability to sleep, anger, irritability, fear, hypervigilance, and hyperarousal. A study of over 30,000 Canadian soldiers following deployments to Afghanistan and the former Yugoslavia found 8.9% of the study cohort to be suffering from PTSD after an average follow-up period of nearly four years.

=== Depression ===
Depression refers, generally, to major depressive disorder or related mood disorders. Depression is widely believed to be the most prevalent mental health diagnosis faced by military members and first responders, accounting for a significant portion of those who are unable to work fully or at all due to mental health reasons. Research within the Canadian Armed Forces has found that at least 8% of full-time members of the Canadian Military exhibit symptoms of major depression.

=== Anxiety disorders ===
Anxiety disorders, including general anxiety disorder, acute stress disorder, social anxiety disorder, and other related diagnoses are also frequently found in the military and first response community. While PTSD falls under the larger category of anxiety disorders, it is often considered distinctly due to its greater prevalence than other anxiety disorders. Anxiety disorders frequently manifest in the form of debilitating stress and anxiety experienced by a victim in the presence or anticipation of triggering stimuli. Anxiety may be disabling in that it may render someone incapable of coping well or at all with a situation that would normally be within their capabilities absent the clinical anxiety. Military research has found anxiety disorders to be more prevalent in those who had deployed to active conflicts. When PTSD is totalled with other anxiety disorders, this category of mental health diagnosis is the most prevalent among Canadian military personnel with deployments

=== Adjustment disorder ===
A lesser known but not uncommon diagnosis among military personnel, adjustment disorder (sometimes referred to as situational depression) is characterized by an individual's inability to adjust to external stressors, or major life events. Although presentation will vary, it may include a combination of depressive, anxious, or post-traumatic stress symptoms that do not meet the clinical threshold for those related named disorders. Adjustment disorder often abates once a person is able to adapt to new circumstances. Military members and first responders may potentially face significant life changes in their careers, including geographic relocations, exposure to very different cultural norms, and potentially the life changing impact of injury or illness and the inability to continue with their career.

=== Substance-related disorder ===
Substance-related disorder, or the abuse of alcohol or drugs, may also be included in the operational stress injury umbrella. The various psychological effects of different substances, particularly the depressive effects of excess alcohol consumption, often serve as a form of 'self medication' for those dealing with other stressors or traumas. Alcohol or drug addictions can often mask or complicate the treatment of symptoms of other disorders, and may need to be addressed before treatment for underlying disorders can be effective.

== Suicide ==
There is a well established link between operational stress injury symptoms, and a heightened risk of suicide. While suicide and suicidality data for military and public safety professions is not comprehensive, these professions are not exceptions to established links between the various mental health disorders and a greater risk of death by suicide.

== Treatment ==
The various disorders that are broadly called 'operational stress injuries' each have their own bodies of research into various treatments and therapies. Most treatments can either be considered pharmacological, such as antidepressant or antianxiety medication, or psychosocial therapy, such as cognitive behavioural therapy. For many patients a combined approach is used, with medications helping to stabilize moods and symptoms while behavioural therapy helps to address underlying memories, cognitions, situation appraisals, and other thinking patterns.

The military and public safety professions vary widely among differing jurisdictions as to what is available in terms of therapy. Military members in western nations typically are covered to some extent by their respective military health services, or by governmental departments dedicated to providing services to veterans, such as Veterans Affairs Canada or the United States Department of Veterans Affairs. Police, firefighters, paramedics, and other related professions will each have differing health care arrangements and benefits depending on the health services an insurance arrangements in their respective country, state, province, territory, or municipality.

In addition to formal healthcare settings, numerous grassroots or state-funded peer support organizations have emerged. Many of these organizations help affected veterans or first responders to connect with each other in physical or virtual peer support settings. Increasingly these organizations have played a role in crisis intervention, suicide prevention, and ongoing support. While informal peer support efforts do not substitute for proper clinical care, they help some affected personnel to begin accepting that they are suffering from traumatic or other stress linked to their occupations, and to begin accessing clinical resources.
