= UBC Hospital =

Public teaching hospital in Vancouver, Canada

- Vancouver Coastal Health
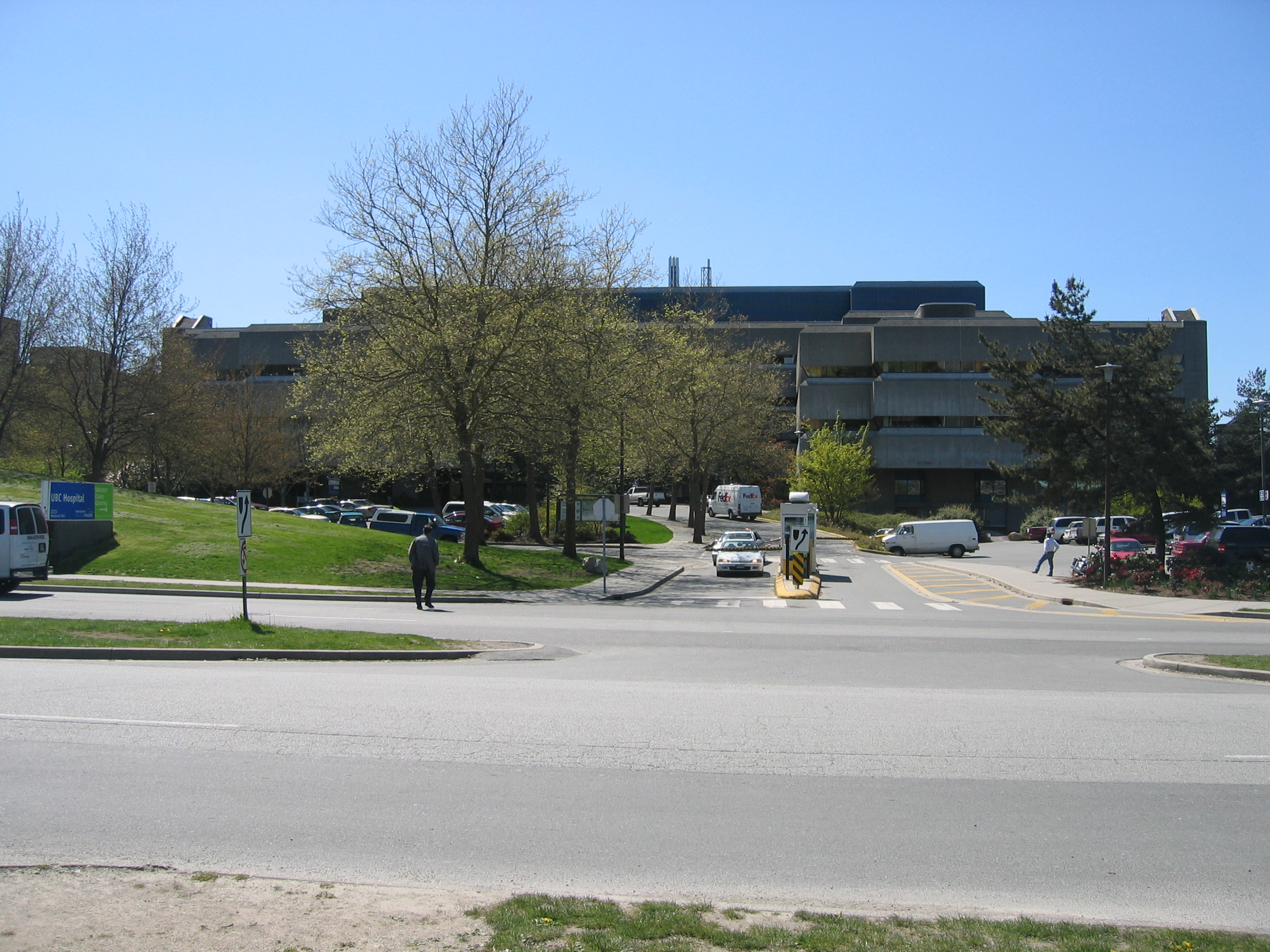
- UBC Hospital in 2006

Geography
- Location: Vancouver, British Columbia, Canada
- Coordinates: 49°15′51″N 123°14′45″W

Organization
- Affiliated university: UBC Faculty of Medicine

Services
- Emergency department: Yes
- Beds: 332

History
- Founded: 1968

Links
- Website: www.vch.ca/en/location/ubc-hospital
- Lists: Hospitals in Canada

UBC Hospital is a teaching hospital located on the UBC Vancouver campus in Vancouver, British Columbia, Canada. It opened in 1968, and is now operated by Vancouver Coastal Health.

== Overview ==
UBC Hospital is made up of three different buildings, the Purdy, Koerner and Detwiller Pavilions. Koerner houses mainly acute services, Purdy houses extended and residential care and Detwiller offers psychiatric services.

The acute portion of UBC Hospital has eight operating rooms (including two for the Centre for Surgical Innovation) and 800 staff including 270 physicians and 450 nurses. Patients make approximately 21,600 clinic visits to the hospital annually, to clinics such as the Bladder Care Centre, the Movement Disorders/Parkinson's Clinic, the Sleep Disorders Program, the Multiple Sclerosis Clinic, the Clinic for Alzheimer Disease and Cognitive Disorders, the Breast Reconstruction Program, the Mood Disorders Centre and the Operational Stress Injury Clinic.

== Units and specialties ==
Units include the Acute Care Unit, Surgical Observation Unit, Transitional Care Unit and Urgent Care Centre in Koerner Pavilion, the Extended Care Unit in Purdy Pavilion, and the Psychiatric Unit in Detwiller Pavilion. Specialty areas at UBC Hospital include acute medicine, general surgery, reconstructive orthopedic surgery, psychiatry and gerontology.

== Centre for Surgical Innovation ==
The Centre for Surgical Innovation is a provincial specialty centre featuring two operating rooms and 38 inpatient beds, opened in April 2006. Approximately 1600 hip and knee replacement surgeries are performed each year.

== Urgent care ==
The UBC Hospital Urgent Care Centre offers specialized treatment for non-life-threatening emergencies by emergency trained physicians and nurses. It is capable of treating allergies, asthma, broken bones, cuts that need stitches, eye problems, fevers, flus, IV therapy, minor burns, nosebleeds, skin infections and sprains and other conditions. The UBC Hospital Urgent Care Centre also offers a range of diagnostic services and testing including X-rays, blood tests, Ultrasound, CT scans and ECGs. The centre handles approximately 18,650 visits every year.

== Research ==
Also located at UBC Hospital is the Brain Research Centre, a partnership of the UBC Faculty of Medicine and Vancouver Coastal Health Research Institute. The Brain Research Centre employs more than 200 investigators with multidisciplinary expertise in neuroscience research ranging from the test tube, to the bedside, to industrial spin-offs.

The National Core for Neuroethics National Core for Neuroethics, a research-based facility, is also based at UBC Hospital.

Opened in 2013, the Djavad Mowafaghian Centre for Brain Health was built adjacent to UBC Hospital. The 135,000-square-foot (12,500 m^{2}) building, bring researchers and clinicians together from the areas of neurology, neuroscience, and psychiatry, and is dedicated solely to brain health. The VHC and UBC take a multi-disciplinary, collaborative approach to tackling brain diseases and disorders.
