= Stéphane Grenier (soldier) =

French-Canadian military officer

Lieutenant Colonel (Retired) Stéphane Grenier CM MSC CD is a French-Canadian military officer known for his work on psychological war trauma and posttraumatic stress disorder. Grenier developed the term Operational Stress Injury (OSI) to describe psychological injuries caused by military duty.

== Military career ==
Grenier joined the Canadian Army in 1983 serving in Rwanda 1994–95, where he was UNAMIR spokesperson. After Rwanda he suffered his own undiagnosed PTSD and depression. In 2001 he coined the term Operational Stress Injury (OSI) and took on a role as advisor and organiser for the Canadian military of the Operational Stress Injury Social Support (OSISS) Program. Grenier served again overseas in Kandahar in 2007.

Grenier gave an interview to CBC News for "Broken Heroes" 5 May 2009, and a statement to the Canadian Parliament 23 November 2010. Grenier has expanded his activity from military psychological trauma to civilian mental health programs. In April 2010, he became a part-time member of the staff at the Workforce Advisory Committee of the Mental Health Commission, on loan from the Canadian Forces.
