= Custirsen =

Chemical compound

Clinical data
- Other names: OGX-011, CC-8490

Identifiers
- IUPAC name: all-P-ambo-2'-O-(2-methoxyethyl)-5-methyl-P-thiocytidylyl-(3'→5')-2'-O-(2-methoxyethyl)-P-thioadenylyl-(3'→5')-2'-O-(2-methoxyethyl)-P-thioguanylyl-(3'→5')-2'-O-(2-methoxyethyl)-5-methyl-P-thiocytidylyl-(3'→5')-2'-deoxy-P-thioadenylyl-(3'→5')-2'-deoxy-P-thioguanylyl-(3'→5')-2'-deoxy-P-thiocytidylyl-(3'→5')-2'-deoxy-P-thioadenylyl-(3'→5')-2'-deoxy-P-thioguanylyl-(3'→5')-2'-deoxy-P-thioadenylyl-(3'→5')-2'-deoxy-P-thioguanylyl-(3'→5')-P-thiothymidylyl-(3'→5')-2'-deoxy-P-thiocytidylyl-(3'→5')-P-thiothymidylyl-(3'→5')-P-thiothymidylyl-(3'→5')-2'-deoxy-P-thiocytidylyl-(3'→5')-2'-deoxy-P-thioadenylyl-(3'→5')-2'-O-(2-methoxyethyl)-5-methyl-P-thiouridylyl-(3'→5')-2'-O-(2-methoxyethyl)-5-methyl-P-thiocytidylyl-(3'→5')-2'-O-(2-methoxyethyl)-P-thioadenylyl-(3'→5')-2'-O-(2-methoxyethyl)-5-methyluridine
- CAS Number: 890056-27-6
- DrugBank: DB05487
- ChemSpider: 34983386
- UNII: L26E95NLRK

Chemical and physical data
- Formula: C_{231}H_{312}N_{78}O_{119}P_{20}S_{20}
- Molar mass: 7346.14 g·mol^{−1}
- SMILES: COCCO[C@H]1[C@@H](O[C@@H]([C@H]1OP(=S)(O)OC[C@@H]1[C@H]([C@H]([C@@H](O1)N1C=NC=2C(N)=NC=NC12)OCCOC)OP(=S)(O)OC[C@@H]1[C@H]([C@H]([C@@H](O1)N1C=NC=2C(=O)NC(N)=NC12)OCCOC)OP(=S)(O)OC[C@@H]1[C@H]([C@H]([C@@H](O1)N1C(=O)N=C(N)C(=C1)C)OCCOC)OP(=S)(O)OC[C@@H]1[C@H](C[C@@H](O1)N1C=NC=2C(N)=NC=NC12)OP(=S)(O)OC[C@@H]1[C@H](C[C@@H](O1)N1C=NC=2C(=O)NC(N)=NC12)OP(=S)(O)OC[C@@H]1[C@H](C[C@@H](O1)N1C(=O)N=C(N)C=C1)OP(=S)(O)OC[C@@H]1[C@H](C[C@@H](O1)N1C=NC=2C(N)=NC=NC12)OP(=S)(O)OC[C@@H]1[C@H](C[C@@H](O1)N1C=NC=2C(=O)NC(N)=NC12)OP(=S)(O)OC[C@@H]1[C@H](C[C@@H](O1)N1C=NC=2C(N)=NC=NC12)OP(=S)(O)OC[C@@H]1[C@H](C[C@@H](O1)N1C=NC=2C(=O)NC(N)=NC12)OP(=S)(O)OC[C@@H]1[C@H](C[C@@H](O1)N1C(=O)NC(=O)C(C)=C1)OP(=S)(O)OC[C@@H]1[C@H](C[C@@H](O1)N1C(=O)N=C(N)C=C1)OP(=S)(O)OC[C@@H]1[C@H](C[C@@H](O1)N1C(=O)NC(=O)C(C)=C1)OP(=S)(O)OC[C@@H]1[C@H](C[C@@H](O1)N1C(=O)NC(=O)C(C)=C1)OP(=S)(O)OC[C@@H]1[C@H](C[C@@H](O1)N1C(=O)N=C(N)C=C1)OP(=S)(O)OC[C@@H]1[C@H](C[C@@H](O1)N1C=NC=2C(N)=NC=NC12)OP(=S)(O)OC[C@@H]1[C@H]([C@H]([C@@H](O1)N1C(=O)NC(=O)C(=C1)C)OCCOC)OP(=S)(O)OC[C@@H]1[C@H]([C@H]([C@@H](O1)N1C(=O)N=C(N)C(=C1)C)OCCOC)OP(=S)(O)OC[C@@H]1[C@H]([C@H]([C@@H](O1)N1C=NC=2C(N)=NC=NC12)OCCOC)OP(=S)(O)OC[C@@H]1[C@H]([C@H]([C@@H](O1)N1C(=O)NC(=O)C(=C1)C)OCCOC)O)CO)N1C(=O)N=C(N)C(=C1)C
- InChI: InChI=1S/C231H312N78O119P20S20/c1-97-52-295(224(324)273-181(97)235)210-174(361-32-24-353-10)166(118(60-310)401-210)422-444(347,464)383-78-136-171(179(366-37-29-358-15)215(406-136)308-95-265-160-189(243)253-86-259-195(160)308)427-448(351,468)387-80-138-172(180(367-38-30-359-16)216(408-138)309-96-269-164-199(309)279-220(247)283-208(164)320)428-447(350,467)385-76-134-168(175(362-33-25-354-11)211(403-134)296-53-98(2)182(236)274-225(296)325)423-442(345,462)380-73-131-114(48-151(397-131)303-90-263-158-187(241)251-84-257-193(158)303)417-439(342,459)379-72-128-115(49-152(398-128)304-91-266-161-196(304)276-217(244)280-205(161)317)418-435(338,455)370-63-121-107(41-144(390-121)291-22-19-141(234)272-223(291)323)411-430(333,450)374-67-125-111(45-148(394-125)300-87-260-155-184(238)248-81-254-190(155)300)415-437(340,457)378-71-130-117(51-154(400-130)306-93-268-163-198(306)278-219(246)282-207(163)319)420-440(343,460)376-68-126-112(46-149(395-126)301-88-261-156-185(239)249-82-255-191(156)301)416-438(341,458)377-70-129-116(50-153(399-129)305-92-267-162-197(305)277-218(245)281-206(162)318)419-436(339,456)373-66-124-109(43-146(393-124)293-56-101(5)201(313)285-228(293)328)413-433(336,453)368-61-119-105(39-142(388-119)289-20-17-139(232)270-221(289)321)409-429(332,449)371-64-122-110(44-147(391-122)294-57-102(6)202(314)286-229(294)329)414-434(337,454)372-65-123-108(42-145(392-123)292-55-100(4)200(312)284-227(292)327)412-432(335,452)369-62-120-106(40-143(389-120)290-21-18-140(233)271-222(290)322)410-431(334,451)375-69-127-113(47-150(396-127)302-89-262-157-186(240)250-83-256-192(157)302)421-441(344,461)382-75-133-167(177(364-35-27-356-13)213(405-133)299-59-104(8)204(316)288-231(299)331)424-445(348,465)384-77-135-169(176(363-34-26-355-12)212(404-135)297-54-99(3)183(237)275-226(297)326)425-446(349,466)386-79-137-170(178(365-36-28-357-14)214(407-137)307-94-264-159-188(242)252-85-258-194(159)307)426-443(346,463)381-74-132-165(311)173(360-31-23-352-9)209(402-132)298-58-103(7)203(315)287-230(298)330/h17-22,52-59,81-96,105-138,142-154,165-180,209-216,310-311H,23-51,60-80H2,1-16H3,(H,332,449)(H,333,450)(H,334,451)(H,335,452)(H,336,453)(H,337,454)(H,338,455)(H,339,456)(H,340,457)(H,341,458)(H,342,459)(H,343,460)(H,344,461)(H,345,462)(H,346,463)(H,347,464)(H,348,465)(H,349,466)(H,350,467)(H,351,468)(H2,232,270,321)(H2,233,271,322)(H2,234,272,323)(H2,235,273,324)(H2,236,274,325)(H2,237,275,326)(H2,238,248,254)(H2,239,249,255)(H2,240,250,256)(H2,241,251,257)(H2,242,252,258)(H2,243,253,259)(H,284,312,327)(H,285,313,328)(H,286,314,329)(H,287,315,330)(H,288,316,331)(H3,244,276,280,317)(H3,245,277,281,318)(H3,246,278,282,319)(H3,247,279,283,320)/t105-,106-,107-,108-,109-,110-,111-,112-,113-,114-,115-,116-,117-,118+,119+,120+,121+,122+,123+,124+,125+,126+,127+,128+,129+,130+,131+,132+,133+,134+,135+,136+,137+,138+,142+,143+,144+,145+,146+,147+,148+,149+,150+,151+,152+,153+,154+,165+,166+,167+,168+,169+,170+,171+,172+,173+,174+,175+,176+,177+,178+,179+,180+,209+,210+,211+,212+,213+,214+,215+,216+,429?,430?,431?,432?,433?,434?,435?,436?,437?,438?,439?,440?,441?,442?,443?,444?,445?,446?,447?,448?/m0/s1; Key:RCFZILUHCNXXFY-DEDWCYLFSA-N

Custirsen (also known as OGX-011 and CC-8490), usually supplied as its sodium salt, is an investigational drug that is under clinical testing for the treatment of cancer. It is an antisense oligonucleotide (ASO) targeting clusterin expression. In metastatic prostate cancer, custirsen showed no benefit in improving overall survival.

Custirsen was developed through a collaboration between OncoGenex Pharmaceuticals Inc. and Isis. In 2009, OncoGenex Pharmaceuticals Inc. and Teva Pharmaceutical Industries Ltd. agreed to develop and commercialize custirsen.

== Mechanism of action ==
An antisense oligonucleotide (ASO) is a single-strand DNA sequence complementary to a desired messenger RNA (mRNA) sequence. Antisense therapy targets gene sequences using antisense oligonucleotides by binding the ASO to the mRNA strand. This creates an inhibitory complex that reduces plasma protein levels by preventing translation.

Custirsen is a second-generation phosphorothioate antisense oligonucleotide. Phosphorothioates are oligonucleotides with a sulfur ion replacing an oxygen molecule in the chain. They have high antisense activity due to their increased chirality, nuclease stability, and solubility. Second-generation oligonucleotides are highly specific to the target mRNA sequence, increasing the affinity of the compound. Custirsen acts as an anti-cancer drug by binding to the mRNA initiation site of the clusterin gene, reducing clusterin protein plasma concentrations. The synthetic addition of a 2'-methoxyethyl on each nucleotide bookending the phosphorothioate backbone causes:

- An increased affinity for the RNA54 targeted gene sequence
- An increased resistance to digestive nucleases
- Decreased toxicity
- Increased tissue half-life by approximately seven days
- Decrease adverse side effects, enabling more potent concentrations

Clusterin is upregulation in many tumours including prostate, breast, non-small cell lung, ovary and colorectal. It has been linked with the development of aggressive tumours by protecting the cells from apoptosis. It is also upregulated in response to standard cancer treatments including chemotherapy, androgen deprivation therapy, and radiation therapy. This resistance is caused by the inhibition of the pro-apoptotic BLC2 gene, prevention of protein aggregation, and increased NF-KB.

The anti-apoptotic activity of clusterin in aiding tumour growth is due to interactions with protein complexes. These include:

- The binding of clusterin to a structurally altered Ku70–Bax complex
- Regulation of Nuclear Factor (NF)-κB activity and signalling
- Kinase ERK and AKT Kinase
- Promoted epithelial-mesenchymal transition

== Pharmacokinetics ==
A meta-analysis study evaluated 5588 Custirsen plasma concentrations from 631 subjects over seven clinical studies. Subjects with cancer received multiple doses between 40 mg and 640 mg intravenously over two hours, whilst healthy subjects received either a single or double dose at 320 mg-640 mg.

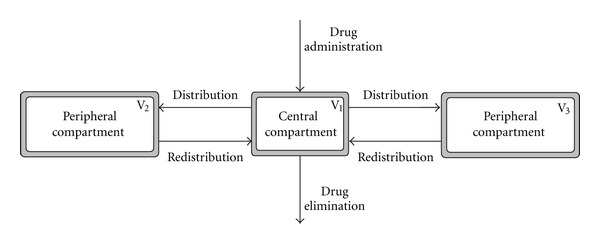
Three compartment model

The pharmacokinetics of Custirsen was described by a three-compartment model with first-order elimination where:

- Three-compartment model refers to the distribution of the drug. The body is divided into central, peripheral 1, and peripheral 2. Distribution rate of the drug is respectively highest to lowest.
- First-order elimination describes the elimination rate of the drug. In first-order kinetics, elimination is proportional to concentration of drug present in the body.

For a representative sixty-six year old with a body mass (kg) of eighty-two and a blood Custirsen level of 0.933 mg/dL, the estimated parameter values were:

- Clearance (CL) = 2.36
- Central Volume of Distribution (V) = 6.08
- Peripheral Volume of Distribution (V ) = 1.13
- Volume of the Second Peripheral Compartment (V ) = 15.8

== Side effects ==
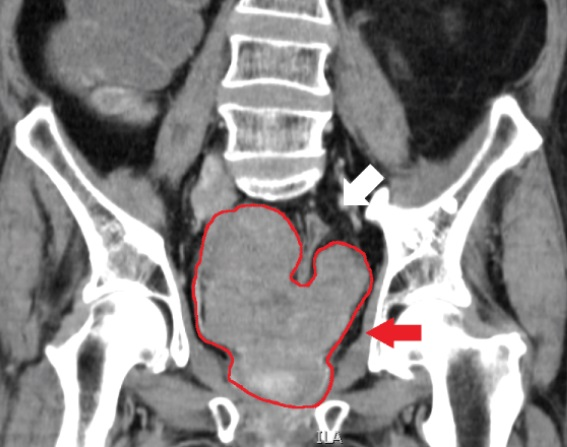
CT scan of prostate cancer

A phase I study investigated the maximum tolerated dose of Custirsen in patients with recurrent or refractory high-grade gliomas.

The recommended and safe dosing of Custirsen was determined in a Phase I same-dose escalation scheme involving forty patients with tumours known to upregulate clusterin with metastatic or locally recurrent disease (prostate, ovary, breast). Custirsen was infused intravenously on days 1, 3, and 5, with weekly dosing starting on day 8 for four weeks. The drug was increasingly administered in six dose cohorts of 40 mg, 80 mg, 160 mg, 320 mg, 480 mg, and 640 mg.

The results found that the recommended dose of Custirsen was 640 mg, with maximum decrease of clusterin blood plasma occurring at this dose. Researchers found a statistically significant increase in the apoptotic index in prostatectomy specimens.

This study provided the dosing framework for further studies into Custirsen, determining 640 mg as a tolerable and biologically active dose.

In this study, no dose-limiting toxicities were reported in doses up to and including 480 mg. For patients who received the 640 mg dose, the following adverse reactions were present:

- Thrombocytopenia
- Anaemia
- Leukopenia
- Fever
- Fatigue
- Rigors
- Alopecia
- Anorexia

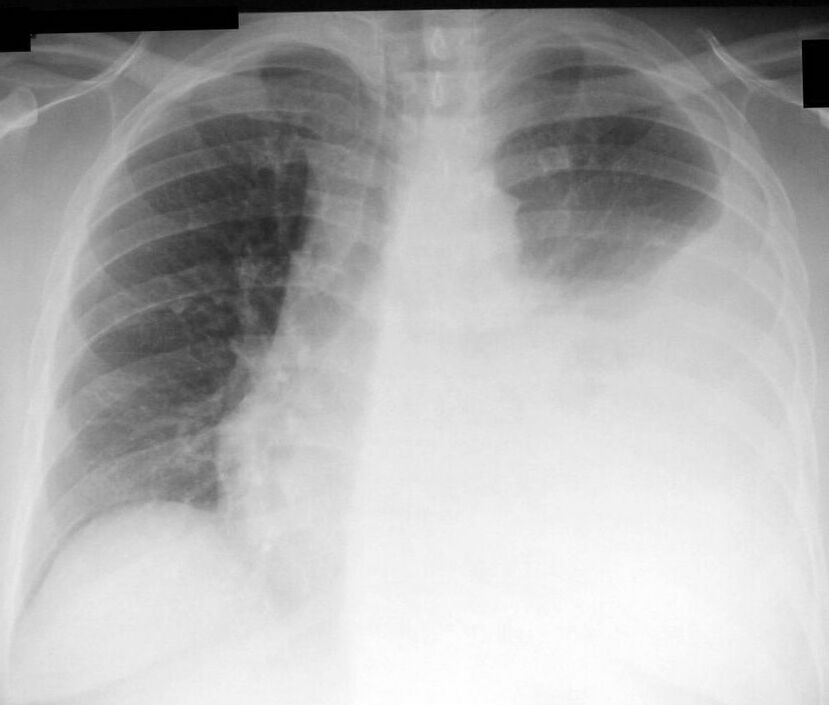
Pleural effusion of the left lung

In patients who received combined treatment with Docetaxel, four of sixteen patients experienced dose-limiting toxicities at 640 mg:

- Dyspnea
- Pleural effusion
- Neutropenia
- Fatigue
- Mucositis

=== Phase III Studies ===
Phase III studies into the effectiveness of the combinational treatment of Custirsen and chemotherapy as a treatment of metastatic-castration-resistant prostate cancer and also Custirsen as a biomarker for clusterin are currently under evaluation.

The Phase III SYNERGY trial looked into the addition of Custirsen to first-line Docetaxel and Prednisone chemotherapy, concluding that there was no marked increased survival rate compared to the Custirsen-independent treatment group. Researchers also found no difference in the progressive rates of the cancer. Contrasting previous research, subjects in the Custirsen group had more adverse reactions to the treatment than the Custirsen-independent group.

The findings of this clinical study contradict the results found in previous studies. However, researchers suggested further studies into patients with metastatic-castration-resistant prostate cancer whom have poor prognostic features, believing there is a therapeutic effect of Custirsen in individuals with this feature of the disease.
