= G. F. Strong Centre =

G. F. Strong Rehabilitation Centre
- GF Strong Rehabilitation Centre

Geography
- Location: Vancouver, Vancouver Fairview, British Columbia, Canada
- Coordinates: 49°14′50″N 123°07′33″W

Organization
- Care system: Public Medicare (Canada) (MSP)
- Type: Rehabilitation Centre
- Affiliated university: University of British Columbia

Services
- Beds: 83

History
- Founded: 1949

Links
- Website: http://www.vch.ca/Locations-Services/result?res_id=1277
- Lists: Hospitals in Canada

GF Strong Rehabilitation Centre is the largest rehabilitation hospital in British Columbia. It is located in the South Cambie neighbourhood of Vancouver.

It provides inpatient, outpatient, outreach and clinical support services to clients/patients across British Columbia and the Yukon in four programs: acquired brain injury, spinal cord injury, and neuromusculoskeletal. It also has specialized programs for adolescents and young adults. Health care professionals such physiatrists deliver individually tailored treatment for people with the most serious and complex injuries and illnesses requiring rehabilitation.

== History ==
Following World War II, there was a large influx of soldiers returning to Canada with permanent disabilities, and there was no facility located in British Columbia to accommodate their needs. Dr. George Frederick Strong was a strong advocate for the building of a rehabilitation centre in BC after his daughter sustained a spinal cord injury. Dr. Strong joined with the Western Division of the Paraplegic Association to realise his dream. GF Strong Rehabilitation Centre opened in 1949, and has since grown in size and scope, treating patients from through BC and the Yukon.

== Patient services ==
=== Acquired brain injuries (ABI) ===
This program offers rehabilitation treatment for patients who have ABIs, this may include strokes, traumatic and non-traumatic brain injuries. This program is run through inpatient and outpatient services, and help also help to connect patients with community supports.

=== Spinal cord injury (SCI) ===
The program has a 22-bed inpatient program, as well as outpatient support for people living in the community. The program encourages patients to realize their abilities and set goals towards rehabilitation.
