= Vancouver General Hospital =

Hospital in British Columbia, Canada

- Vancouver Coastal Health
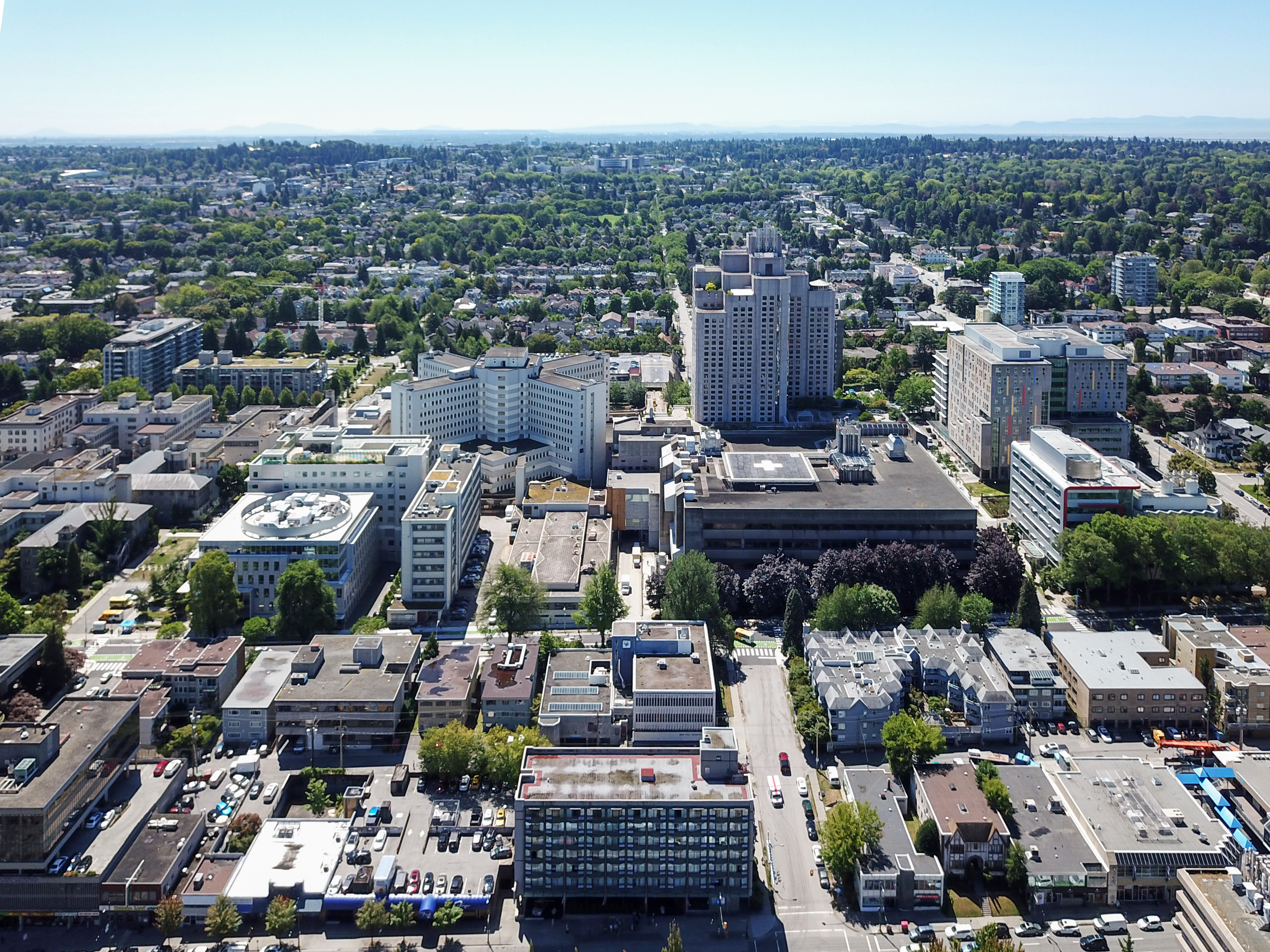
- Aerial view of Vancouver General Hospital

Geography
- Location: 899 West 12th Avenue, Vancouver, British Columbia, Canada
- Coordinates: 49.2612°N 123.1230°W

Organization
- Care system: Public Medicare (Canada)
- Type: Teaching
- Affiliated university: UBC Faculty of Medicine

Services
- Emergency department: Yes, level I trauma centre
- Beds: 1,000+
- Speciality: Bone marrow transplant and leukemia, burns and plastics, epilepsy surgery program, organ transplant, spinal cord injury, quaternary-level trauma care

Helipads
- Helipad: TC LID: CBK4

History
- Founded: 1906

Links
- Website: www.vch.ca/en/location/vancouver-general-hospital
- Lists: Hospitals in Canada

Vancouver General Hospital (locally known as VGH, or Vancouver General) is a medical facility located in Vancouver, British Columbia. It is the largest facility in the Vancouver Hospital and Health Sciences Centre (VHHSC) group of medical facilities. VGH is Canada's third largest hospital by bed count, after Hamilton General Hospital, and Foothills Medical Centre.

Vancouver Coastal Health (VCH) is responsible for all operations at Vancouver General Hospital.

== History ==
The Canadian Pacific Railway (CPR) first opened in 1886 a nine-bed tent, its primary use to treat railway workers. On June 13, 1886, a fire destroyed the tent hospital and by July, a new, one-storey building was built. In September, the City of Vancouver took over the facility, which became the City Hospital. In 1888, located at the southern edge of the original Gastown settlement, a 35-bed hospital opened, as the tent infirmary became too small. The upstairs ward was for female patients, the downstairs ward for males. In 1899, the Vancouver City Hospital Training School for Nurses was opened. In 1902, British Columbia provincial legislature transferred control from the city's board of health to a board of 15 directors. Vancouver City Hospital was renamed to Vancouver General Hospital.

In 1906, in Fairview Ridge, overlooking False Creek, a new building, the Heather Pavilion, began housing staff and patients. The University of British Columbia Medical School opened clinical facilities at VGH in 1950.

In 1959, VGH opened the "Centennial Pavilion" (named in commemoration of the centennial of the founding of British Columbia as a British Crown colony, in 1858), which at the time was the largest part of the VGH facilities. It was renamed for Leon Judah Blackmore in 2017.

In the 1960s, VGH built Canada's first intensive care nursery, equipped with the first effective apparatus used for natural breathing in infants with respiratory failure.

In 1996, VGH opened the first three floors of its newly constructed Laurel Pavilion. In 2000, the Laurel Pavilion was renamed to the Jim Pattison Pavilion and construction of the final 12 floors began in 2001. The Jim Pattison Pavilion opened in 2003.

In 2004, construction of the new Gordon and Leslie Diamond Health Care Centre began. This new building, adjacent to the Jim Pattison Pavilion, opened in August 2006 to provide acute day care services in a variety of areas.

The Lung Centre specializes in the treatment of pulmonary conditions such as asthma, emphysema, chronic bronchitis, bronchiectasis, lung cancer, occupational and environmental lung diseases, sarcoidosis, pneumonia, tuberculosis, pulmonary hypertension and interstitial lung disease.

The Blusson Spinal Cord Centre, the world's largest, most advanced and most comprehensive facility devoted to spinal cord injury research and patient care was opened in November 2008. The six-storey, $45-million centre is home to ICORD (International Collaboration on Repair Discoveries), the Rick Hansen Institute and the Brenda and Davide McLean Integrated Spine Clinic and is a partnership of the University of British Columbia, the Rick Hansen Foundation, Vancouver Coastal Health Research Institute, and the VGH & UBC Hospital Foundation.

The Robert H.N. Ho Research Centre, opened in September 2011, is a seven-storey, 69,350 sq ft (6,443 m^{2}) facility that houses three of VGH's key research programs: the Vancouver Prostate Centre at VGH; the Centre for Hip Health and Mobility; and the Ovarian Cancer Research Initiative.

== Facilities and amenities ==
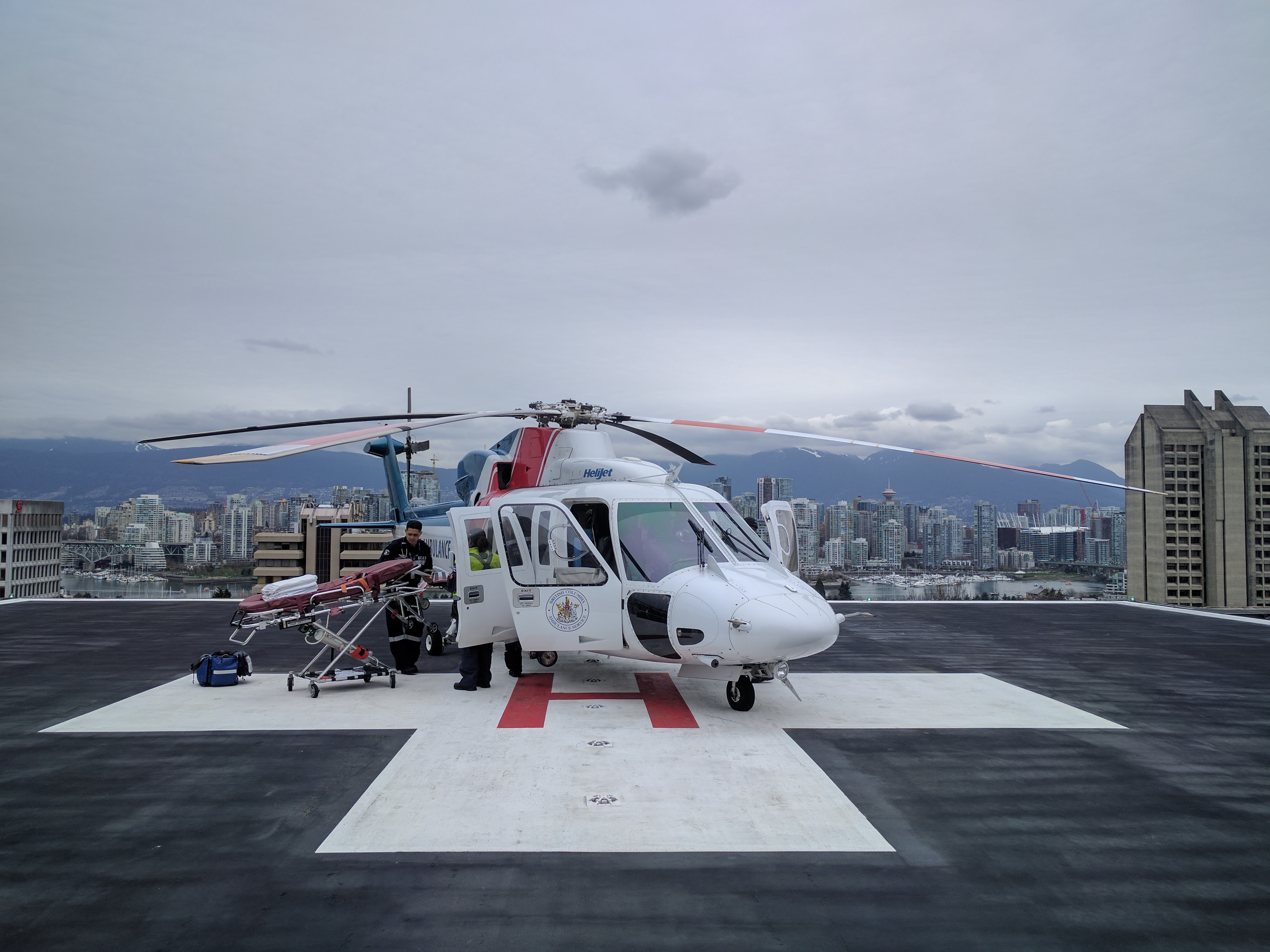
BCEHS critical care team on the helicopter pad on the top of Vancouver General Hospital following the offloading of a patient

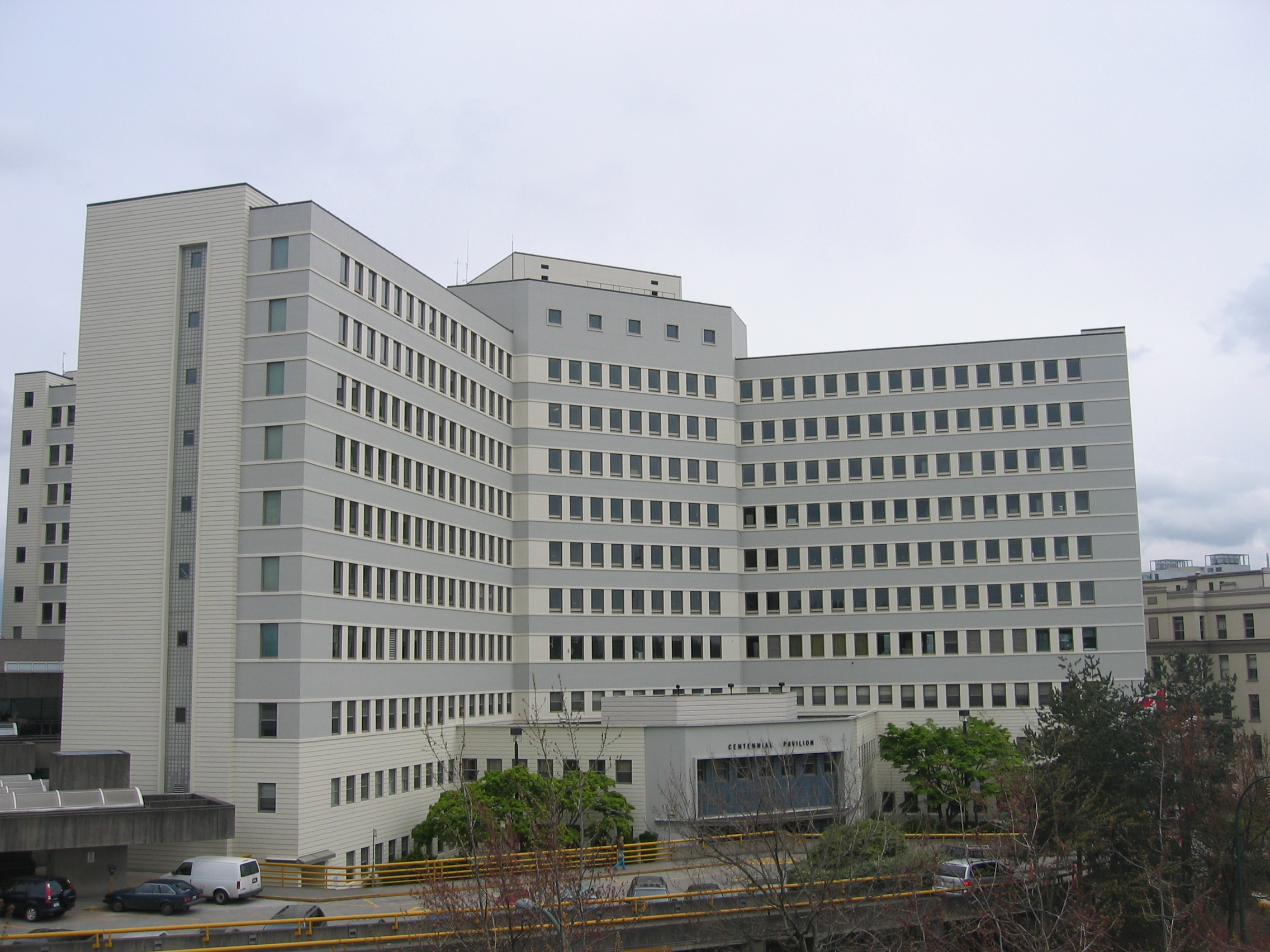
Vancouver General Hospital's Centennial Pavilion

VGH is the largest hospital in British Columbia, offering specialized and tertiary services to adult patients (18 and above) in Vancouver. The hospital accepts patients referred from other parts of the province requiring highly specialized services. Approximately 40% of the hospital's cases come from outside the Vancouver region. Vancouver General Hospital is an internal medicine hospital, with pediatric and maternal care services in the Vancouver region being offered by BC Children's Hospital and BC Women's Hospital & Health Centre, located roughly 2.5 km south of Vancouver General.

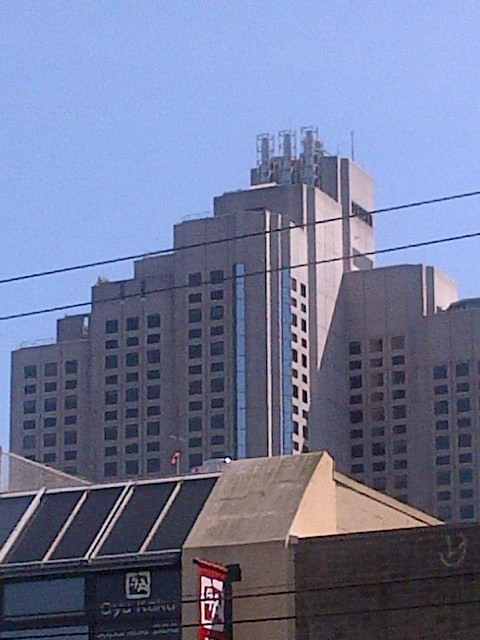
Street view of Vancouver General Hospital from West Broadway

In addition to providing specialized and tertiary medical services, VGH is also a teaching hospital in affiliation with the University of British Columbia Faculty of Medicine, providing training and advanced education to students from all disciplines. Unique in Canada is the Gordon and Leslie Diamond Health Care Centre at VGH which includes the UBC Faculty of Medicine facilities. The facility houses teaching space for about 250 third and fourth year medical students and 500 postgraduate residents, and nine Faculty of Medicine programs as well as the UBC medical school library.

VGH's main cafeteria, Sassafras Cafeteria, is located on the second floor of the Jim Pattison Pavilion. The pavilion also has a café at its main entrance called Café Ami.

== Facts and figures ==
- One emergency department
- 24 operating rooms
- 40 outpatient clinics
- 27,400 inpatient (overnight) visits per year
- 294,300 clinic visits per year
- 94,348 emergency department visits per year (15/16 fiscal)
- 23,000 outpatient and inpatient surgical cases per year

== Divisions ==
- Respiratory Medicine and Thoracic Surgery
- Alzheimer Clinic
- BC Injury Prevention Centre
- Centre for Cardiac Rehabilitation and Risk Factor Management
- Domestic Violence
- Eye Care Centre, established in 1983 with funds raised with the help of Stephen M. Drance
- Leukemia/Bone Marrow Transplant Program
- Mary Pack Arthritis Centre
- Trauma Services/Orthopedic Trauma Service
- Outpatient Psychiatry Clinic
- CIBC Centre for Patients and Families
- Vancouver Prostate Centre
- Short Term Assessment and Treatment Centre (STAT)
- Skin Care Centre
- Work Adjustment Program
- Vancouver Coastal Health Research Institute
- Centre for Hip Health

== Emergency Room documentary series ==
In 2014, Knowledge Network premiered "Emergency Room: Life + Death at VGH" a six-part documentary series directed by Kevin Eastwood which follows several VGH emergency department staff and patients over a period of 80 days between February and May 2013. The series won twice at the 2014 Leo Awards, taking home Best Documentary Series and the People's Choice Award for Favourite TV Series.

The second season of Emergency Room: Life + Death at VGH began on April 12, 2016.

== Notable deaths ==
- Errol Flynn, Australian-American actor
