= Vancouver Coastal Health =

Regional health authority in British Columbia, Canada

- VCH service area map
- Formation: 2001
- Type: British Columbia Health Authority
- President & Chief Executive Officer: Vivian Eliopoulos
- Key people: Bob Chapman, Michelle de Moor, Gail Malenstyn, Darlene MacKinnon, Charlene Chiang, Fernando Pica, Darcia Pope, Wayne Balshin, Lorraine Blackburn, Dr. Patricia Daly, Yasmin Jetha, Jo-Ann Tait
- Budget: $3.2 billion (CDN) (approx)
- Staff: 29,000 staff and medical staff (approx), 3,000 volunteers (approx), 900 researchers (approx)
- Website: www.vch.ca

Vancouver Coastal Health (VCH) is a regional health authority that provides health services including primary, secondary, tertiary and quaternary care, home and community care, mental health services, population and preventive health and addictions services in part of Greater Vancouver and the Coast Garibaldi area.

VCH is one of five publicly funded regional healthcare authorities within the Canadian province of British Columbia. The government of British Columbia, through the British Columbia Ministry of Health, sets province-wide goals, standards and performance agreements for health service delivery by the seven health authorities.

== Service area ==
Vancouver Coastal Health Authority serves the 1.25 million of British Columbia's population of five million (approximately one in four) who live in a geographic area of 58,560 square kilometres (22,610 sq mi) that includes 12 municipalities, four regional districts and 14 Aboriginal communities. VCH is geographically divided into three health service delivery areas (HSDA), which in turn are divided into 14 local health areas (LHA).

The following regional districts are partially or entirely covered by VCHA.

- Metro Vancouver Regional District (partial: includes city of Vancouver, Richmond, and the North Shore only)
- Squamish-Lillooet Regional District (partial: Howe Sound LHSA includes Squamish, Whistler, and Pemberton; excludes Lillooet)
- Sunshine Coast Regional District
- qathet Regional District (including Powell River)
- Central Coast Regional District (including Bella Bella and Bella Coola)
- Cariboo Regional District (partial: Bella Coola Valley LHSA includes Electoral Area J only)
