= Mamoru Oye =

Canadian judoka

Personal information
- Nickname: Moe
- Born: 1 April 1937 (age 87)
- Occupation: Judoka

Sport
- Country: Canada
- Sport: Judo
- Rank: 9th dan black belt
- Club: University of Manitoba Judo Club

Mamoru "Moe" Oye (born 1 April 1937) is a Canadian judoka, one of only five Canadian judoka to achieve the rank of kudan (ninth dan), and has been deeply involved in the development of Canadian Judo, especially in Manitoba. He has served as President of Judo Manitoba and Vice-President of Judo Canada, coached Olympic competitors Mark Berger, Ewan Beaton, and Niki Jenkins, and was inducted into the Judo Canada Hall of Fame in 1996 and the Manitoba Sports Hall of Fame in 2000. He was promoted to kudan in January 2021.

== Interviews ==
- "Mr. Judo". Sport Manitoba Podcast (Podcast). 26 February 2021.

== See also ==
- Judo in Manitoba
- Judo in Canada
- List of Canadian judoka
