= Judo at the 1983 Pan American Games =

Judo Judo at the 1983 Pan American Games
- Location: Caracas, Venezuela
- Dates: 15–18 August 1983

Competition at external databases
- Links: JudoInside

This page shows the results of the Judo Competition for men and women at the 1983 Pan American Games, held from August 14 to August 29, 1983 in Caracas, Venezuela. There were eight weight divisions, for both men and women. The women's judo competition made its debut at the Pan American Games.

== Medal table ==
Rank	Nation	Gold	Silver	Bronze	Total
1	United States (USA)	8	2	4	14
2	Cuba (CUB)	4	2	6	12
3	Canada (CAN)	2	4	5	11
4	Venezuela (VEN)	1	3	2	6
5	Mexico (MEX)	1	0	2	3
6	Brazil (BRA)	0	5	6	11
7	Argentina (ARG)	0	0	4	4
8	Chile (CHI)	0	0	1	1
8	Dominican Republic (DOM)	0	0	1	1
8	Puerto Rico (PUR)	0	0	1	1
Totals (10 entries)		16	16	32	64

== Men's competition ==
=== Men's Bantamweight (-60 kg) ===
RANK	NAME JUDOKA
	Rafael Rodríguez (CUB)
	Luis Juniti Shinohara (BRA)
	Rafael González (MEX)
	Phil Takahashi (CAN)

=== Men's Featherweight (-65 kg) ===
RANK	NAME JUDOKA
	Gerardo Padilla (MEX)
	James Martin (USA)
	Sergio Sano (BRA)
	Ricardo Tuero (CUB)

=== Men's Lightweight (-71 kg) ===
RANK	NAME JUDOKA
	Guillermo d'Nelson (CUB)
	Luís Onmura (BRA)
	Omar Abdala (ARG)
	Mike Swain (USA)

=== Men's Light Middleweight (-78 kg) ===
RANK	NAME JUDOKA
	Brett Barron (USA)
	Juan Ferrer (CUB)
	Carlos Huttich (MEX)
	José Strático (ARG)

=== Men's Middleweight (-86 kg) ===
RANK	NAME JUDOKA
	Louis Jani (CAN)
	Robert Berland (USA)
	Walter Carmona (BRA)
	Alejandro Strático (ARG)

=== Men's Light Heavyweight (-95 kg) ===
RANK	NAME JUDOKA
	Isaac Azcuy (CUB)
	Aurélio Fernández Miguel (BRA)
	Fabian Annutti (ARG)
	Leo White (USA)

=== Men's Heavyweight (+95 kg) ===
RANK	NAME JUDOKA
	Mark Berger (CAN)
	Frederico Flexa (BRA)
	Jorge Fis (CUB)
	Douglas Nelson (USA)

=== Men's Open ===
RANK	NAME JUDOKA
	Venancio Gómez (CUB)
	Fred Blaney (CAN)
	Desiderio Lebron (DOM)
	José O. Fuentes (PUR)

== Women's competition ==
=== Women's Extra Lightweight (-48 kg) ===
RANK	NAME JUDOKA
	Darlene Anaya (USA)
	Inêz Nazareth (BRA)
	Tina Takahashi (CAN)
	María Villapol (VEN)

=== Women's Half Lightweight (-52 kg) ===
RANK	NAME JUDOKA
	Mary Lewis (USA)
	Nancy Clayton (CAN)
	Cecilia Alacan (CUB)
	Solange Almeida (BRA)

=== Women's Lightweight (-56 kg) ===
RANK	NAME JUDOKA:
	Ann Maria Rousey DeMars (USA)
	Natasha Hernández (VEN)
	Ines Dantin (CUB)
	Tânia Ishii (BRA)

=== Women's Half Middleweight (-61 kg) ===
RANK	NAME JUDOKA
	Robin Chapman (USA)
	Nereida Brito (VEN)
	Diane Amyot (CAN)
	Carla Duarte (BRA)

=== Women's Middleweight (-66 kg) ===
RANK	NAME JUDOKA
	Christine Penick (USA)
	Lorraine Methot (CAN)
	Carolina Aguilar (VEN)
	Vilma Cianelli (CHI)

=== Women's Half Heavyweight (-72 kg) ===
RANK	NAME JUDOKA
	Allison Henry (VEN)
	Nancy Jewitt (CAN)
	Belinda Binkley (USA)
	Nilda Espinoza (CUB)

=== Women's Heavyweight (+72 kg) ===
RANK	NAME JUDOKA
	Margaret Castro (USA)
	Regla Povea (CUB)
	Soraia André (BRA)
	Sara Rilves (CAN)

=== Women's Open ===
RANK	NAME JUDOKA
	Heidi Bauersachs (USA)
	Allison Henry (VEN)
	Regla Povea (CUB)
	Sara Rilves (CAN)
