= Duncan Vignale =

Canadian judoka

Personal information
- Born: Mimico, Ontario
- Occupation: Judoka

Sport
- Country: Canada
- Sport: Judo
- Rank: 8th dan black belt
- Club: Tanino Judo Club; Centre for Martial Arts
- Coached by: Frank Hatashita; Masao Takahashi; Mits Tanino; Katsuyoshi Takata

Duncan Vignale is a Canadian judoka who has played a significant role in the development of judo in Canada and especially Ontario. He has held several important positions such as President of Judo Ontario and Vice-President of Judo Canada, coached the Ontario judo team, and served as a kata judge for the International Judo Federation. He won the Syl Apps Special Achievement Award in 2011, was made a Lifetime Member of Judo Ontario in 2013, and is one of just seventeen Canadian judoka to achieve the rank of hachidan (eighth dan). Vignale was also selected as an alternate to Doug Rogers for the 1964 Summer Olympics.

== Interviews ==
- "Duncan Vignale – Part One". The Dr. Vibe Show (Podcast). 14 March 2010.
- "Duncan Vignale – Part Two – "You Have To Put Pork Chops On The Table"". The Dr. Vibe Show (Podcast). 27 March 2010.
- "Duncan Vignale – Part Three – "The Watermelon Story"". The Dr. Vibe Show (Podcast). 19 July 2010.

== See also ==
- Judo in Ontario
- Judo in Canada
- List of Canadian judoka
