= Brad Farrow =

Canadian judoka (born 1956)

Personal information
- Born: 5 October 1956 (age 69)
- Occupation: Judoka

Sport
- Sport: Judo
Medal record
Men's judo
Representing Canada
Pan American Games
Gold medal – first place	1975 Mexico City	Featherweight
Gold medal – first place	1979 San Juan	Featherweight
Bronze medal – third place	1983 Caracas	Featherweight

Profile at external databases
- JudoInside.com: 796

Brad Farrow (born 5 October 1956, in Vancouver, British Columbia) is a retired judoka from Canada, who represented his native country at two Summer Olympics: 1976 and 1984. He twice won a gold medal at the Pan American Games during his career in the featherweight division (– 63 kg), in 1975 and 1979.

== See also ==
- Judo in Alberta
- Judo in Canada
- List of Canadian judoka
