= Judo at the 1987 Pan American Games =

Judo Judo at the 1987 Pan American Games
- Location: Indianapolis, Indiana, United States
- Dates: 8–12 August 1987

Competition at external databases
- Links: JudoInside

The Judo Competition for men and women at the 1987 Pan American Games was held from August 7 to August 23, 1987, in Indianapolis, United States. There were eight weight divisions for both men and women.

== Medal table ==
Place	Nation	Gold medal	Silver medal	Bronze medal	Total
1	Brazil	5	3	4	12
2	United States	4	5	4	13
3	Cuba	4	2	7	13
4	Puerto Rico	2	0	1	3
5	Canada	1	2	6	9
6	Venezuela	0	2	5	7
7	Dominican Republic	0	1	0	1
7	Mexico	0	1	0	1
9	Ecuador	0	0	2	2
9	Colombia	0	0	2	2
11	Argentina	0	0	1	1
Total		16	16	32	64

== Men's competition ==
=== Bantamweight (-60 kg) ===
RANK	NAME JUDOKA
	Sérgio Pessoa (BRA)
	Kevin Asano (USA)
	Jorge di Noco (ARG)
	Rafael Rodríguez (CUB)

=== Featherweight (-65 kg) ===
RANK	NAME JUDOKA
	Ismael Borbona (CUB)
	Nelson Onmura (BRA)
	Eduardo Landazury (COL)
	Víctor Rivera (PUR)

=== Lightweight (-71 kg) ===
RANK	NAME JUDOKA
	Mike Swain (USA)
	Luís Onmura (BRA)
	Rómulo Alvarez (VEN)
	Ignacio Sayu (CUB)

=== Light Middleweight (-78 kg) ===
RANK	NAME JUDOKA
	Jason Morris (USA)
	Carlos Huttich (MEX)
	Andrés Franco (CUB)
	Campos Kilmar (VEN)

=== Middleweight (-86 kg) ===
RANK	NAME JUDOKA
	Rinaldo Caggiano (BRA)
	Charles Griffith (VEN)
	José González (CUB)
	William Medina (COL)

=== Light Heavyweight (-95 kg) ===
RANK	NAME JUDOKA
	Aurélio Fernández Miguel (BRA)
	Joe Meli (CAN)
	Belarmino Salgado Martínez (CUB)
	Leo White (USA)

=== Heavyweight (+95 kg) ===
RANK	NAME JUDOKA
	Frank Moreno (CUB)
	Frederico Flexa (BRA)
	Fred Blaney (CAN)
	Douglas Nelson (USA)

=== Open ===
RANK	NAME JUDOKA
	Jorge Fis (CUB)
	Damon Keeve (USA)
	Fred Blaney (CAN)
	Rogério Cherobim (BRA)

== Women's competition ==
=== Extra Lightweight (-48 kg) ===
RANK	NAME JUDOKA
	Monica Angelucci (BRA)
	Maricela Bonelli (CUB)
	Darlene Anaya (USA)
	Lyne Poirier (CAN)

=== Half Lightweight (-52 kg) ===
RANK	NAME JUDOKA
	Lisa Boscarino (PUR)
	Joann Quiring (USA)
	Kathy Hubble (CAN)
	Maritza Pérez (CUB)

=== Lightweight (-56 kg) ===
RANK	NAME JUDOKA
	Cecilia Alacán (CUB)
	Eve Trivella (USA)
	Nathalie Gosselin (CAN)
	Olga Lugo (VEN)

=== Half Middleweight (-61 kg) ===
RANK	NAME JUDOKA
	Lynn Roethke (USA)
	Natasha Hernández (VEN)
	Soraya Carvalho (BRA)
	Amanda Clayton (CAN)

=== Middleweight (-66 kg) ===
RANK	NAME JUDOKA
	Sandra Greaves (CAN)
	Andrea Hernández (DOM)
	Marcia Quiñónez (ECU)
	Christine Penick (USA)

=== Half Heavyweight (-72 kg) ===
RANK	NAME JUDOKA
	Soraia André (BRA)
	Allison Webb (CAN)
	María Cangá (ECU)
	Anny Fernández (VEN)

=== Heavyweight (+72 kg) ===
RANK	NAME JUDOKA
	Nilmaris ("Nilmari") Santini Martin (PUR)
	Margaret Castro (USA)
	Estela Rodríguez Villanueva (CUB)
	Rosemeri Salvador (BRA)

=== Open ===
RANK	NAME JUDOKA
	Margaret Castro (USA)
	Estela Rodríguez (CUB)
	Francis Gómez (VEN)
	Ivana Santana (BRA)
