= Charles Maingon =

French and Canadian judoka and academic

Personal information
- Born: 12 October 1942 Paris, France
- Died: September 24, 2018 (aged 75) Kingston, Ontario, Canada
- Occupation: Professor

Sport
- Country: Canada
- Sport: Judo
- Rank: 4th dan black belt
- Club: Cloverdale Judo Club; Club de judo Hakudokan
- Coached by: Fred Okimura; Raymond Damblant; Doug Rogers

Profile at external databases
- JudoInside.com: 44809

Charles Maingon (12 October 1942 – 24 September 2018) was a French and Canadian judoka and university professor who won gold at the 1969 Canadian National Judo Championships and represented Canada at the 1969 and 1971 World Judo Championships in the -70 kg category. He and Vincent Grifo, who won the National Championship in his own weight category the same year as Maingon, were the first Canadian Champions from Quebec.

Maingon was born in Paris, France and moved to Montreal with his family in 1959 at the age of 17. He started practicing judo while still in France but most of his training took place in Canada. He was promoted to sankyu (third Kyū) at Seidokwan Academy of Judo under Fred Okimura in 1961, shodan (first dan) in 1964 at Club de judo Hakudokan under Raymond Damblant, and refused further promotion after reaching yondan (fourth dan). He was the long-time technical director at the Cloverdale Judo Club in Kingston, Ontario and travelled to Montreal on a near-weekly basis to practice at Hakudokan.

Maingon completed a bachelor's degree at McGill University (1967) and master's and PhD degrees (1969 and 1972, supervised by David J. Niederauer) at the University of British Columbia, all in French Literature. He became a professor of French Studies after finishing his PhD, first at Royal Roads Military College in Colwood, British Columbia, then at the Royal Military College of Canada in Kingston from 1970 until he retired in 2000. His PhD thesis and several of his publications focus on the work of French novelist and art critic Joris-Karl Huysmans.

== Selected publications ==
- Maingon, Charles (1994). La médecine dans l'œuvre de J.K. Huysmans (in French). Libr. A.-G. Nizet.
- Maingon, Charles (1984). Émile Verhaeren, critique d'art (in French). Libr. A.-G. Nizet.
- Maingon, Charles (1977). L'univers artistique de J.-K. Huysmans (in French). Paris: Libr. A.-G. Nizet.

== See also ==
- Judo in Ontario
- Judo in British Columbia
- Judo in Quebec
- Judo in Canada
- List of Canadian judoka
