= Yuzuru Kojima =

Canadian judoka (born 1938)

Personal information
- Nickname: Jim
- Born: 1938 (age 86–87); Richmond, British Columbia
- Occupation: Judoka

Sport
- Country: Canada
- Sport: Judo
- Rank: 8th dan black belt
- Club: Steveston Judo Club

Yuzuru "Jim" Kojima CM (born 1938) is a Canadian judoka who has been deeply involved in the development of Canadian Judo, and was made a Member of the Order of Canada in 1983 and decorated with the Order of the Rising Sun, Gold Rays with Rosette in 2011 for his efforts. He has been the President of Judo Canada, Director of the International Judo Federation Referee Commission, Chair of the 1993 World Judo Championships in Hamilton, Ontario, and was inducted into the BC Sports Hall of Fame in 2023.

== Publications ==
- Nykon, Daniel Allan; Kojima, Jim (2004). The Story of the Steveston Judo Club. Richmond, B.C.: Steveston Judo Club.

== See also ==
- Judo in British Columbia
- Judo in Canada
- List of Canadian judoka
