= Judo at the 1979 Pan American Games =

Judo Judo at the 1979 Pan American Games
- Location: San Juan, Puerto Rico
- Dates: 1–15 July 1979

Competition at external databases
- Links: JudoInside

This page shows the results of the Men's Judo Competition at the 1979 Pan American Games, held from July 1 to July 15, 1979 in San Juan, Puerto Rico. There were a total number of eight weight divisions, and just men competing.

== Medal table ==
Rank	Nation	Gold	Silver	Bronze	Total
1	Brazil (BRA)	4	1	2	7
2	Cuba (CUB)	2	1	3	6
3	Canada (CAN)	2	1	2	5
4	United States (USA)	0	2	3	5
5	Dominican Republic (DOM)	0	1	0	1
5	Puerto Rico (PUR)	0	1	0	1
5	Venezuela (VEN)	0	1	0	1
8	Mexico (MEX)	0	0	3	3
9	Argentina (ARG)	0	0	1	1
9	Chile (CHI)	0	0	1	1
9	Netherlands Antilles (AHO)	0	0	1	1
Totals (11 entries)		8	8	16	32

== Men's competition ==
=== Men's Bantamweight (-60 kg) ===
RANK	NAME JUDOKA
	Luis Shinohara (BRA)
	Edward Liddie (USA)
	Rafael González (MEX)
	Phil Takahashi (CAN)

=== Men's Featherweight (-65 kg) ===
RANK	NAME JUDOKA
	Brad Farrow (CAN)
	Luis Onmura (BRA)
	Gerardo Padilla (MEX)
	Héctor Rodríguez (CUB)

=== Men's Lightweight (-71 kg) ===
RANK	NAME JUDOKA
	Guillermo d'Nelson (CUB)
	Kevin Doherty (CAN)
	Roberto Machusso (BRA)
	Andrés Puentes (MEX)

=== Men's Light Middleweight (-78 kg) ===
RANK	NAME JUDOKA
	Carlos da Cunha (BRA)
	Radamés Lora (DOM)
	Brett Barron (USA)
	Juan Ferrer (CUB)

=== Men's Middleweight (-86 kg) ===
RANK	NAME JUDOKA
	Louis Jani (CAN)
	Alexis Mundo (VEN)
	Eduardo Novoa (CHI)
	Leo White (USA)

=== Men's Light Heavyweight (-95 kg) ===
RANK	NAME JUDOKA
	Carlos Pacheco (BRA)
	Venancio Gómez (CUB)
	Sergio Komornickie (ARG)
	Miguel Tudela (USA)

=== Men's Heavyweight (+95 kg) ===
RANK	NAME JUDOKA
	José Ibañez (CUB)
	Jesse Goldstein (USA)
	Jaime Felipa (AHO)
	Oswaldo Simões (BRA)

=== Men's Open ===
RANK	NAME JUDOKA
	Oswaldo Simões (BRA)
	Héctor Estévez (PUR)
	José Ibañez (CUB)
	Joseph Meli (CAN)
