= Tina Takahashi =

Canadian judoka

Personal information
- Born: 13 January 1960 (age 66) Toronto, Ontario
- Occupation: Judoka

Sport
- Country: Canada
- Sport: Judo
- Rank: 7th dan black belt
- Club: Takahashi Dojo

Profile at external databases
- JudoInside.com: 21357
- Updated on 12 August 2025

Tina Takahashi is a Canadian judoka, coach and author. She won Canada's first gold medal at the World University Games in Judo in 1984 and coached Canada's first women's Judo Olympian Sandra Greaves in the 1988 Olympics in Seoul. Takahashi was the first Canadian woman to achieve the rank of shichi-dan (seven-degree black belt), and the first women's Sport Canada carded athlete.

Takahashi was Canadian champion 9 times, has taught Judo for more than 30 years, and was inducted into the Judo Canada Hall of Fame in 1998 and the Ottawa Sports Hall of Fame in 2016. In 2008, she was named as Chair of the National Grading Board by Judo Canada.

Takahashi is the daughter of Canadian judoka Masao Takahashi and June Takahashi, and the sister of Olympians Phil Takahashi and Ray Takahashi.

In 2005, she co-authored a book titled Mastering Judo with her parents and three siblings.

== Publications ==
- Takahashi, Masao; Family (2005). Mastering Judo. Windsor, Ontario: Human Kinetics. ISBN 073605099X.

== Education ==
Bachelor of Physical Education, Bachelor of Education & Ontario Teachers Certificate.

== Championships and Accomplishments ==
=== Highlights ===
- Judo Canada Hall of Fame Inductee
- Former Olympic Judo coach
- World University Judo champion
- 7th degree Black Belt
- Former World Sambo Champion
- Co-Author of "Mastering Judo" by Masao Takahashi & Family

=== Competitive Highlights (National and International Tournaments) ===
- World University Championship – 1st place (1984 France)
- World Sambo Championships – 1st place (1980 Montreal)
- Pacific Rim – 1st place (1981 Japan, 1980 Hawaii)
- World Championships – 5th place (1980 USA, 1982 France)
- Senior Canadian Judo Nationals – 1st place (1976, 1978–1984)
- Canada Cup – 1st place (1980 Montreal)
- Cadet Canadian Nationals – 1st place (1974, 1976, 1977)
- Quebec Open – 1st place (1979–1981 Montreal)
- Pan Am Games – 3rd place (1983 Caracas, Venezuela)
- French International – 3rd place (1981 France)
- British Open – 3rd place (1977 England)
- Dutch Open – 3rd place (1981 Holland)
- Pan American Championships – 3rd place (1982 Chile, 1984 Mexico, 1985 Cuba)
- Pan American Championships – 2nd place (1980 Venezuela)
- Desert Open – 1st place (1980 Arizona)

=== Awards ===
- Ottawa Sport Hall of Fame (inducted 3 June 2016)
- Canadian Asian of the Year Finalist (2011 Sheila Copps Award)
- Female Coach of the Year Award from Judo Ontario (2010)
- Life member Judo Ontario/Judo Canada
- Certificate of Recognition, Pioneer of Women's Competitive Judo JC (2006)
- Judo Ontario Hall of Fame (2002)
- Judo Canada Hall of Fame (1998)
- City of Nepean Wall of Fame (1986)
- Canadian Sport Award, Athlete of the Month (1984)
- International Achievement Award, Sport Federation of Canada (1980)
- Ontario Distinguished Performance Achievement Award (1976–1984)

=== Judo Canada CAREER ACHIEVEMENT CATEGORIES ===
- COACHING: ’88 OLYMPICS, ’86 WORLDS, ’87 WORLDS COMPETITOR: ’80 WORLDS, ’82 WORLDS, ’84 WORLDS CONTRIBUTION TO SPORT: Chair National Grading Board ORIGINAL SENSEI: RENEE HOCK ’93 & ’95 WORLDS Promoted to Rokudan (6th degree) in 2003 (22 years as 6th dan) and Promoted to Shichidan (7th degree) in 2024, Judo practitioner for over 50 years, teaching/coaching for 40 years.
  - Coached Women’s National team at over 20 international tournaments throughout Europe, Asia, Africa, North, South and Central America
  - Participated in many national and international training camps and clinics throughout the world. NCCP level 3 certified
  - Judo Ontario Provincial Coach at several National Championships
  - Coached Ontario Winter Games for the East Region
  - Coached Women’s National Team in Ottawa ‘85-‘88, and at the Seoul Olympics. Judo Canada National Team Resource Coach until mid 1990s. Tina's three sons who are all National judo medalists. (Adam 3rd 2015 2nd 2011), Torin (1st x 2, 2011, 2012, 2nd x2, 2015, 2013, 2009 +), Liam Macfadyen (3rd 2012)
  - Taught judo to children, teens and adults recreationally and in schools for 40 years.
  - Taught judo to Prime Minister Justin Trudeau and his brothers and all the children of former Prime Minister, Brian Mulroney

=== Coaching Highlights with Women's National Team ===
- 1988 Olympic Games in Korea
- 1986 World Championships in Netherlands
- 1987 World Championships in Germany
- 1987 Pan Am Games in Indianapolis, USA
- 1989 Francophonie Games in Morocco
- 3-time Fukuoka International Women's Championships in Japan

=== Volunteer Highlights ===
- Chairperson for Judo Canada's National Grading Board (2008)
- Member of Judo Canada National Grading Board (2004–2008)
- Member Judo Ontario Black Belt Grading Board (2000–present)
- Women's National Judo Team Representative (mid ‘80s)
- Assistant Regional Director of East Region (early ‘90s)
- Provincial "A" referee
- East Region Tournament Organizer

=== Kata (Pre-arranged forms/patterns of movement) ===
- 1st place in Nage no Kata CNE Int’l 1989, medaled in Ju-no- kata, Katame-no-kata
- Course conductor kata, gokyo and competitive clinics in Ontario and Quebec
- Judge Pan Ams and several Nationals
- Chair for the National Grading Board
- Organizer of kata judging seminars in 2008 with Kuniko Takeuchi Sensei, Chairperson Pan Am Kata Committee

=== Athlete Development (National and International Judo Champions) ===
Original sensei, coached many athletes from children to national and international champions. i.e. Renee Hock (World competitor ’93, ’95, many int’l medals, Senior National Champion ‘86), Tony Walby (Para Olympics 2012, IBSA Worlds 2014, Sr. National Champ 2008 & multi time National medals), Evan O’Leary (Masters National Champion), Karen Hayde (KDK Cup Brazil champ, Sr. National champ ‘95), Linda Konkol (Senior National champ ‘89), Julie Leblanc (Senior National champ ’85, US Open 2nd, 3rd, ‘’87-’88) Michael and Kristina Kiss (Juv. National champs) Dave Shapiro (Juv, National champ), Torin Macfadyen (U18 National champ, U15 National Champ), Sean Macfadyen (Masters Pan Am champ ’07, QC Open ’09, RMC International 2009, Sr. Prov Team member) Stewart Tanaka (Senior National medalist), Thomas Filter (Junior National champ '02), Alicia Rimad (U17 National Champ '10)

== Videos and Photos ==
- Tina Takahashi on CTV Ottawa Morning Live, Part 1, Part 2, Part 3 (CTV Ottawa Morning Live on YouTube)
- Tina Takahashi Martial Art and Fitness (Videos)
- Photos

== See also ==
- Judo in Ontario
- Judo in Canada
- List of Canadian judoka
