= Yeiji Inouye =

Canadian judoka (1925–2018)

Personal information
- Nickname: Lanky
- Born: February 19, 1925; North Arm, British Columbia
- Died: June 26, 2018 (aged 93); Saanichton, British Columbia
- Occupation: Judoka

Sport
- Country: Canada
- Sport: Judo
- Rank: 9th dan black belt
- Club: Victoria Judo Club
- Coached by: Shigetaka Sasaki

Yeiji "Lanky" Inouye (19 February 1925 – 26 June 2018) was a Canadian judoka, is one of only five Canadian judoka to achieve the rank of Kudan (9th dan), and was deeply involved in the development of judo in Canada. He was President of Judo British Columbia, Coach for the 1969 Canadian World Judo Championships team, Chairman of the National Grading Board, inducted into the Judo Canada Hall of Fame in 2001, and inducted into the Victoria Hall of Fame in 2018. Inouye co-founded the Victoria Judo Club in 1957.

== See also ==
- Judo in British Columbia
- Judo in Canada
- List of Canadian judoka
