= Karen Sheffield =

Canadian judoka (born 1961)

Karen (Sheffield) Heney
Personal information
- Born: 7 April 1961 (age 65) Toronto, Ontario, Canada
- Occupation: Judoka
- Years active: 1977–1989 (competition)
- Weight: 56 kg (123 lb)

Sport
- Country: Canada
- Sport: Judo
- Rank: Yondan (4th dan) belt
- Club: Munster Judo Club
- Coached by: Masao Takahashi; Chris Toole; Frank Hatashita; Goki Uemura; Hiroshi Nakamura; Jim Wong
Medal record
Representing Canada
Pan American Championships
| Silver medal – second place | 1982 Santiago | –56 kg |
| Bronze medal – third place | 1984 Mexico City | –56 kg |
| Bronze medal – third place | 1986 Salinas | –56 kg |

Profile at external databases
- JudoInside.com: 10787

Karen Sheffield Heney (born 7 April 1961) is a Canadian retired judoka and coach who won three medals at the Pan American Judo Championships between 1982 and 1986. Sheffield was Canadian Champion 10 times, has taught judo for over 25 years and represented Canada at the 1980 World Judo Championships, in New York City, United States, the first edition of this competition to allow women.

== See also ==
- Judo in Ontario
- Judo in Canada
- List of Canadian judoka
