= Wayne Erdman =

Canadian judoka (born 1952)

Personal information
- Born: February 3, 1952 (age 74) Kitchener, Ontario
- Occupation: Judoka

Sport
- Sport: Judo
- Rank: 7th dan black belt
Medal record
Men's Judo
Representing Canada
Pan American Games
Gold medal – first place	1975 Mexico City	Lightweight

Profile at external databases
- JudoInside.com: 9942

Wayne Erdman (born February 3, 1952, in Kitchener, Ontario) is a Canadian retired judoka who represented Canada in Judo at the 1976 Summer Olympics in Montreal, Quebec, Canada. He won the gold medal at the 1975 Pan American Games in the men's lightweight division (– 70 kg). Erdman holds the rank of 7th dan and is the chair of the Grading Board for Judo Ontario. He is also a certified Level 3 NCCP coach and a former National Coach. He is currently a senior sensei at the Kaizen Judo Club in Kitchener, Ontario, Canada.

== See also ==
- Judo in Ontario
- Judo in Canada
- List of Canadian judoka
