= Colin Morgan (judoka) =

Canadian judoka (born 1973)

Personal information
- Born: 12 November 1973 (age 52) Calgary, Alberta, Canada
- Occupation: Judoka

Sport
- Sport: Judo
Medal record
Pan American Games
| Bronze medal – third place | 1995 Mar del Plata | Light Middleweight |

Profile at external databases
- JudoInside.com: 844

Colin Morgan (born 12 November 1973) is a Canadian judoka.

Morgan won a bronze medal at the 1995 Pan American Games in the Men's Light Middleweight (-78 kg) event. He competed in the men's half-middleweight event at the 1996 Summer Olympics.

He is the twin brother of Canadian judoka Keith Morgan.

== See also ==
- Judo in Alberta
- Judo in Canada
- List of Canadian judoka
