= William Morgan (judoka) =

Canadian judoka (born 1975)

Personal information
- Born: 2 March 1975 (age 50) Parry Sound, Ontario, Canada
- Occupation: Teaching assistant
- Employer: W. Ross Macdonald School for the Blind
- Height: 1.78 m (5 ft 10 in)
- Weight: 98 kg (216 lb) (2008)

Sport
- Country: Canada
- Sport: Judo
- Disability: Blind
- Rank: 3rd dan black belt
- Club: Brantford Judo Club
- Coached by: Tom Thompson

Profile at external databases
- JudoInside.com: 116457
- Updated on 29 August 2012

William "Bill" Morgan (born 2 March 1975) is a Canadian judoka who represented Canada in judo at the 2000, 2004, and 2008 Paralympics. He placed seventh in the -81 kg category, fifth in the -81 kg category, and seventh in the -100 kg category, respectively, and in 2004 and 2008 was Canada's only competitor in judo. Morgan won bronze at the International Blind Sports World Championships in 2006.

== See also ==
- Judo in Ontario
- Judo in Canada
- List of Canadian judoka
