= Glenn Beauchamp =

Canadian judoka (born 1962)

Personal information
- Born: 17 January 1962 (age 64) Toronto, Ontario, Canada
- Occupation: Judoka

Sport
- Sport: Judo
Medal record
Representing Canada
Summer Universiade
Silver medal – second place	1985 Kobe	-78kg

Glenn Beauchamp (born 17 January 1962) is a Canadian judoka. He competed at the 1984 Summer Olympics and the 1988 Summer Olympics.

== See also ==
- Judo in Ontario
- Judo in Canada
- List of Canadian judoka
