= Jane Patterson =

Canadian judoka (born 1960)

Personal information
- Born: 22 July 1960 (age 65)
- Occupation: Judoka

Sport
- Sport: Judo
Medal record
Women's Judo
Representing Canada
Pan American Games
Bronze medal – third place	1991 Havana	Heavyweight
Bronze medal – third place	1991 Havana	Open Class

Profile at external databases
- JudoInside.com: 9631

Jane Patterson Priddis, Alberta is a female judoka from Canada. She competed for her native country at the 1992 Summer Olympics in Barcelona, Spain, where she was defeated in the first round of the repêchage.

Patterson won two bronze medals at the 1991 Pan American Games, in the Women's Heavyweight (+ 72 kg) and in the Women's Open Class division. She was affiliated with the Shidokan Judo Club in Montreal.

== See also ==
- Judo in Ontario
- Judo in Canada
- List of Canadian judoka
