= Yves LeGal =

Canadian judoka

Personal information
- Born: Paris, France
- Occupation: Judoka

Sport
- Country: Canada
- Sport: Judo
- Rank: 8th dan black belt
- Club: Memorial University Judo Club; Nanaimo Judo Club

Yves M. LeGal is a French and Canadian judoka and retired professor of surgery who is considered the 'Father of Judo in Newfoundland and Labrador' for his work in developing and promoting judo in the province after moving there in 1968. He was Director of University Judo for Judo Canada, coached the Canadian University Judo Team, founded and served as President of the Newfoundland and Labrador Judo Association, and was inducted into the Sport Newfoundland and Labrador Hall of Fame in 1990 and the Judo Canada Hall of Fame in 2003. He also played a major role in the development of judo in Saskatchewan, serving as the chief instructor at six clubs and training 22 students to shodan (1st dan) in the province from 1953 to 1968. Since retirement from Memorial University LeGal has moved to Vancouver Island and serves as an instructor at the Nanaimo Judo Club.

== Selected publications ==
- LeGal, Yves M. (May 1990). "Lung and heart-lung transplantation". The Annals of Thoracic Surgery. 49 (5): 840–844. doi:10.1016/0003-4975(90)90044-7. PMID 2187426.
- Thomas, S.G.; M.H. Cox; Y.M. LeGal; T.J. Verde; H.K. Smith (September 1989). "Physiological profiles of the Canadian National Judo Team". Canadian Journal of Sport Sciences. 14 (3): 142–7. PMID 2819609.

== See also ==
- Judo in Canada
- List of Canadian judoka
