= Goki Uemura =

Canadian judoka

Personal information
- Born: 1943
- Died: 16 January 2025 (aged 81–82)
- Occupation: Judoka

Sport
- Country: Canada
- Sport: Judo
- Rank: 8th dan black belt
- Club: Shin Bu Kan Judo Club

Goki Uemura (1943 – 16 January 2025) was a Canadian judoka who represented Canada in the 1973 World Judo Championships in the -70 kg category. He is one of just seventeen Canadian judoka to achieve the rank of hachidan (eighth dan) and co-founded the Shin Bu Kan Judo Club in Etobicoke, Ontario in 1982, which later relocated in Mississauga, Ontario and is now also known as the Mississauga Judo Club.

== See also ==
- Judo in Ontario
- Judo in Canada
- List of Canadian judoka
