= Justin Karn =

Canadian judoka (born 1981)

Personal information
- Nickname: The Badger
- Born: June 16, 1981 (age 45) Guelph, Ontario
- Occupation: Judoka
- Height: 1.67 m (5 ft 6 in)
- Weight: 60 kg (132 lb) (2012)

Sport
- Country: Canada
- Sport: Judo
- Disability: Blind
- Disability class: B3
- Club: Asahi Judo Club
- Coached by: Tom Thompson
Medal record
Paralympic judo
Representing Canada
Parapan American Games
Bronze medal – third place	2011 Guadalajara	-60kg
- Updated on 29 March 2021

Justin Karn (born June 16, 1981) is a Canadian judoka who represented Canada in Judo at the 2012 Paralympics in the -60 kg category. He was eliminated from the tournament in repêchage due to disqualification by penalties (four shido leading to hansoku make) in his match against South Korea's Min-Jae Lee. Karn has been competing in Judo for around 18 years, and in 2011 won bronze in the -60 kg category of the Parapan American Games. He was born with aniridia, an eye condition that left him without irises, and also has astigmatism and mutated corneas in both eyes.

== See also ==
- Judo in Ontario
- Judo in Canada
- List of Canadian judoka
