= Carolyne Lepage =

Canadian judoka (born 1975)

Personal information
- Born: June 9, 1975 (age 51) Montreal, Quebec
- Occupation: Judoka

Sport
- Sport: Judo
Medal record
Women's Judo
Representing Canada
Pan American Games
Silver medal – second place	2003	Extra Lightweight

Profile at external databases
- JudoInside.com: 832

Carolyne Lepage (born June 9, 1975, in Montreal, Quebec) is a female judoka from Canada, who won the silver medal in the women's extra lightweight division (– 48 kg) at the 2003 Pan American Games in Santo Domingo, Dominican Republic. She represented her native country at two Summer Olympics: in 1996 and 2004.

== See also ==
- Judo in Ontario
- Judo in Canada
- List of Canadian judoka
