= David Miller (judoka) =

Canadian judoka (born 1961)

Personal information
- Born: 11 April 1961 (age 63); North York, Ontario, Canada
- Occupation: Judoka

Sport
- Country: Canada
- Sport: Judo
- Rank: 6th dan black belt
- Club: Annex Judo Academy
- Coached by: Nobuyuki Sato; Yasuhiro Yamashita

Profile at external databases
- JudoInside.com: 13620

David Miller (born 11 April 1961) is a Canadian judoka who represented Canada in the 1995 World Judo Championships. He is currently the head instructor of the Annex Judo Academy, located in the Annex neighbourhood of Toronto, Ontario, which he founded in 1997, and has taught judo and physical education at Royal St. George's College since 1999. Miller began practising judo in 1972 and later spent significant time studying judo in Japan, including 9 years at Tokai University under Nobuyuki Sato and Yasuhiro Yamashita.

== See also ==
- Judo in Ontario
- Judo in Canada
- List of Canadian judoka
