= Michelle Buckingham =

Canadian Olympic judoka

Personal information
- Born: September 1, 1968 (age 57) Los Angeles, California, United States
- Home town: Montreal, Canada

Sport
- Sport: Judo
Medal record
Representing Canada
Pan American Games
Silver medal – second place	1995 Mar del Plata	Half-middleweight

Michelle Thèrese Buckingham (born 1 September 1968 in Los Angeles) is a Canadian former judoka who competed in the 1992, 1996 and the 2000 Summer Olympics.

== See also ==
- Judo in Ontario
- Judo in Canada
- List of Canadian judoka
