= William McGregor (judoka) =

Canadian judoka

Personal information
- Born: 3 December 1949 Toronto, Ontario, Canada
- Died: 16 May 1997 (aged 47)
- Occupation: Judoka

Sport
- Sport: Judo

William McGregor (3 December 1949 – 16 May 1997) was a Canadian judoka. He competed in the men's half-middleweight event at the 1972 Summer Olympics.

== See also ==
- Judo in Ontario
- Judo in Canada
- List of Canadian judoka
