= Keith Morgan (judoka) =

Canadian judoka (born 1973)

Personal information
- Born: November 12, 1973 (age 53) Calgary, Alberta, Canada
- Occupation: Judoka
- Spouse: Waneek Horn-Miller

Sport
- Sport: Judo
Medal record
Men's judo
Representing Canada
Pan American Games
| Gold medal – first place | 1995 Mar del Plata | Light Heavyweight |
| Silver medal – second place | 2003 Santo Domingo | Middleweight |
| Silver medal – second place | 2007 Rio de Janeiro | Light Heavyweight |
| Bronze medal – third place | 1999 Winnipeg | Middleweight |
Summer Universiade
| Gold medal – first place | 1999 Palma de Mallorca | Middleweight |
Commonwealth Games
| Silver medal – second place | 2002 Manchester | Middleweight |

Profile at external databases
- JudoInside.com: 845

Keith Laurence Morgan (born November 12, 1973) is a retired judoka from Canada, who competed in four consecutive Summer Olympics, and won four medals at the Pan American Games.

== Sporting career ==
Morgan represented his native country at four consecutive Summer Olympics, starting in 1996 in Atlanta, Georgia. He was affiliated with the Club de Judo Shikodan in Montreal. He is the twin brother of Colin Morgan, who competed as a judoka at the 1996 Summer Olympics.

Morgan was inducted into Judo Canada's Hall of Fame in 2013. Keith is also a sponsored athlete of Healy Ford.

== See also ==
- Judo in Alberta
- Judo in Canada
- List of Canadian judoka
