= Judo at the 1995 Pan American Games =

Judo Judo at the 1995 Pan American Games
- Location: Mar del Plata, Argentina
- Dates: 23–26 March 1995

Competition at external databases
- Links: JudoInside

This page shows the results of the Judo Competition for men and women at the 1995 Pan American Games, held from March 11 to March 26 in Mar del Plata, Argentina. There were eight weight divisions.

== Medal table ==
Place	Nation	Gold medal	Silver medal	Bronze medal	Total
1	Cuba	10	3	1	14
2	Canada	3	2	6	11
3	United States	1	4	8	13
4	Brazil	1	3	9	13
5	Argentina	1	2	3	6
6	Venezuela	0	1	2	3
7	Dominican Republic	0	1	1	2
8	Honduras	0	0	1	1
8	Puerto Rico	0	0	1	1
Total		16	16	32	64

== Men's competition ==
=== Men's Flyweight (-56 kg) ===
RANK	FINAL
	Ismady Alonso (CUB)
	Luis Vizcaino (DOM)
	Jacob Flores (USA)
	Rodolfo Yamayose (BRA)

=== Men's Bantamweight (-60 kg) ===
RANK	FINAL
	Ewan Beaton (CAN)
	Manolo Poulot Ramos (CUB)
	Carlos Bortole (BRA)
	Jorge Daniel Lencina (ARG)

=== Men's Featherweight (-65 kg) ===
RANK	FINAL
	Israel Hernández Planas (CUB)
	Francisco Morales Vivas (ARG)
	Henrique Guimarães (BRA)
	Taro Tan (CAN)

=== Men's Lightweight (-71 kg) ===
RANK	FINAL
	James Pedro (USA)
	Erick de la Paz (CUB)
	Jean-Pierre Cantin (CAN)
	Sergio Oliveira (BRA)

=== Men's Light Middleweight (-78 kg) ===
RANK	FINAL
	Gastón García (ARG)
	Jason Morris (USA)
	Flávio Canto (BRA)
	Colin Morgan (CAN)

=== Men's Middleweight (-86 kg) ===
RANK	FINAL
	Nicolas Gill (CAN)
	Carlos Matt (BRA)
	Pablo Elisii (ARG)
	Brian Olson (USA)

=== Men's Light Heavyweight (-95 kg) ===
RANK	FINAL
	Keith Morgan (CAN)
	Daniel dell'Aquila (BRA)
	Rafael Hueso (USA)
	Belarmino Salgado Martínez (CUB)

=== Men's Heavyweight (+95 kg) ===
RANK	FINAL
	José Mario Tranquilini (BRA)
	Frank Moreno (CUB)
	Orlando Baccino (ARG)
	Damon Keeve (USA)

== Women's competition ==
=== Women's Flyweight (-45 kg) ===
RANK	FINAL
	Mirledis Turro (CUB)
	Sherrie Chambers (USA)
	Dora Maldonado (HON)
	Evelyn Matias (PUR)

=== Women's Extra Lightweight (-48 kg) ===
RANK	FINAL
	Amarilis Savón (CUB)
	Caroline Lepage (CAN)
	Andrea Rodrigues (BRA)
	María Villapol (VEN)

=== Women's Half Lightweight (-52 kg) ===
RANK	FINAL
	Legna Verdecia (CUB)
	Carolina Mariani (ARG)
	Nathalie Gosselin (CAN)
	Jo Anne Quiring (USA)

=== Women's Lightweight (-56 kg) ===
RANK	FINAL
	Driulis González (CUB)
	Corinna Broz (USA)
	Renee Hock (CAN)
	Danielle Zangrando (BRA)

=== Women's Half Middleweight (-61 kg) ===
RANK	FINAL
	Ileana Beltrán (CUB)
	Michelle Buckingham (CAN)
	Xiomara Griffith (VEN)
	Colleen MacDonald (USA)

=== Women's Middleweight (-66 kg) ===
RANK	FINAL
	Odalis Revé (CUB)
	Liliko Ogasawara (USA)
	Vânia Yukie Ishii (BRA)
	Dulce Piña (DOM)

=== Women's Half Heavyweight (-72 kg) ===
RANK	FINAL
	Diadenis Luna (CUB)
	Francis Gómez (VEN)
	Valéria Brandino (BRA)
	Grace Jividen (USA)

=== Women's Heavyweight (+72 kg) ===
RANK	FINAL
	Daima Beltrán (CUB)
	Adeline Andrade (BRA)
	Nancy Filteau (CAN)
	Colleen Rosensteel (USA)
