= Olia Berger =

Canadian judoka (born 1980)

Personal information
- Born: 1980 (age 45–46)
- Occupation: Judoka

Sport
- Sport: Judo
Medal record
Women's Judo
Representing Canada
Pan American Games
Bronze medal – third place	2003 Santo Domingo	Heavyweight
Maccabiah Games
Bronze medal – third place	1997 Maccabiah Games	+72 kg

Profile at external databases
- JudoInside.com: 13232

Olia Berger (born June 30, 1980) is a female judoka from Canada. Her father is judoka Mark Berger, who was an Olympic medalist for Canada in 1984.

Berger, who is Jewish, earned a bronze medal for Canada in judo in the O72 at the 1997 Maccabiah Games in Tel Aviv, Israel. In 1999, she won the Pan American Under-17 Championship in judo in the O70.

She won the bronze medal in the women's heavyweight division (+ 78 kg) at the 2003 Pan American Games in Santo Domingo, Dominican Republic, alongside Ecuador's Carmen Chalá. She came in fifth at the Judo World Cup Prague in 2005. In 2000, 2001, 2002, 2004, 2007, and 2008, she won the Canadian Championships in the O78.

== See also ==
- Judo in Canada
- List of Canadian judoka
