= Kevin Doherty (judoka) =

Canadian judoka (born 1958)

Personal information
- Born: November 6, 1958 (age 67) Toronto, Ontario
- Occupation: Judoka
- Height: 1.78 m (5 ft 10 in)
- Weight: 87 kg (192 lb) (1988)

Sport
- Country: Canada
- Sport: Judo
- Rank: 8th dan black belt
- Club: Ajax Budokan Judo Club
Medal record
Men's Judo
World Championships
Bronze medal – third place	1981 Maastricht	-78 kg
Pan American Games
Silver medal – second place	1979 San Juan	Lightweight

Profile at external databases
- JudoInside.com: 792
- Updated on 10 September 2012

Kevin Doherty (born November 6, 1958, in Toronto, Ontario) is a retired judoka from Canada, who represented his native country at two consecutive Summer Olympics: 1984 and 1988. He won the silver medal at the 1979 Pan American Games in the lightweight division (– 71 kg). He also won the bronze medal at the 1981 World Championships in the Half Middleweight division (78 kg). In 1986, he won the bronze medal in the 86 kg weight category at the judo demonstration sport event as part of the 1986 Commonwealth Games.

== See also ==
- Judo in Ontario
- Judo in Canada
- List of Canadian judoka
