= Roman Hatashita =

Canadian judoka

Personal information
- Born: 22 August 1965 (age 59); Waterloo, Ontario, Canada
- Occupation: Entrepreneur

Sport
- Sport: Judo
- Rank: 5th dan black belt
- Coached by: Frank Hatashita

Profile at external databases
- JudoInside.com: 44800

Roman Hatashita (born 22 August 1965) is a Canadian judoka and entrepreneur who represented Canada at the 1992 Olympics in the -71 kg category. Since 1998, he has owned and operated Hatashita International, a martial arts supply company founded by his uncle Frank Hatashita in 1947.

== See also ==
- Judo in Canada
- List of Canadian judoka
