= Tony Walby =

Canadian judoka (born 1973)

Personal information
- Born: August 22, 1973 (age 52) Ottawa, Ontario
- Occupation: Judoka
- Height: 1.76 m (5 ft 9 in)
- Weight: 118 kg (260 lb) (2012)

Sport
- Country: Canada
- Sport: Judo
- Disability: Cone dystrophy
- Disability class: B2
- Rank: 6th dan black belt
- Club: Takahashi School of Martial Arts
- Coached by: Tom Thompson
Medal record
Paralympic judo
Representing Canada
Parapan American Games
Bronze medal – third place	2011 Guadalajara	+100kg

Profile at external databases
- JudoInside.com: 880
- Updated on 12 November 2021

Tony Walby (born August 22, 1973) is a Canadian judoka who represented Canada in Judo at the 2012 Paralympics in the +100 kg category and - 90 kg division in the 2016 Paralympic Games in Rio. He won his first match, lost his second, and was then eliminated in repêchage.

Walby has been practising Judo since 1980, was a member of the able-bodied Canadian Judo team for 16 years, and won the national heavyweight championship in his last year of competition. He has genetic cone dystrophy, however, which caused his sight to begin deteriorating significantly in his early 20s, and he was declared legally blind around age 35. Two years later he learned that his visual impairment qualifies him to compete in the Paralympics and began training for competition again. In 2011 he won bronze in the +100 kg category of the Parapan American Games. Walby currently trains and coaches at the Takahashi Martial Arts School in Ottawa, Ontario, which was founded by Masao Takahashi. His Paralympic coach is Tom Thompson.

== See also ==
- Judo in Canada
- List of Canadian judoka
