= Rainer Fischer =

Canadian judoka (born 1949)

Personal information
- Born: September 14, 1949 (age 76) Hamburg, Germany
- Occupation: Judoka

Sport
- Sport: Judo
Medal record
Men's judo
Representing Canada
Pan American Games
Gold medal – first place	1975 Mexico City	-80 kg

Profile at external databases
- JudoInside.com: 44794

Rainer Fischer (born September 14, 1949 in Hamburg, Germany) is a Canadian retired judoka, who represented Canada at the 1976 Summer Olympics in Montreal, Quebec, Canada. He won the gold medal at the 1975 Pan American Games in the men's middleweight division (–80 kg) and a bronze medal at the 1974 Pan American judo championships in Panama. He won six national titles between 1972 and 1976 including three middleweight (–80 kg) and three open weight titles as a middleweight.

== See also ==
- Judo in Ontario
- Judo in Canada
- List of Canadian judoka
