= Priscilla Gagné =

Canadian judoka (born 1986)

Personal information
- Born: 21 May 1986 (age 40) Granby, Quebec, Canada
- Occupation: Judoka

Sport
- Country: Canada
- Sport: Paralympic judo
- Disability: Retinitis pigmentosa
- Coached by: Nathalie Gosselin; Andrzej Sądej
Medal record
Paralympic judo
Representing Canada
Paralympic Games
Silver medal – second place	Tokyo 2020	-52 kg
IBSA World Championships
Bronze medal – third place	2018 Odivelas	-52 kg
Parapan American Games
Silver medal – second place	2015 Toronto	-52 kg
Silver medal – second place	2019 Lima	-52 kg
IBSA Pan Am Championships
Gold medal – first place	2018 Calgary	-52 kg
Gold medal – first place	2020 Montreal	-52 kg

Profile at external databases
- JudoInside.com: 99668

Priscilla Gagné (born 21 May 1986) is a partially blind Canadian judoka. She won a silver medal at the 2020 Summer Paralympics.

On 21 August 2021, Gagné was announced as Canada's flagbearer during the 2020 Summer Paralympics opening ceremony.

== Career ==
Gagné won the bronze medal at the 2015 Para Judo World Cup.

She is a double Parapan silver medalist and was the first Canadian female medalist in the IBSA World Championships.

Gagné will be inducted into the Women's Wrestling Hall of Fame in 2024.

== See also ==
- Judo in Canada
- List of Canadian judoka
