= Ewan Beaton =

Canadian judoka (born 1969)

Personal information
- Born: July 13, 1969 (age 57) Edmonton, Alberta
- Occupation: Judoka

Sport
- Country: Canada
- Sport: Judo
- Rank: 5th dan black belt
- Coached by: Mamoru Oye
Medal record
Men's Judo
Pan American Games
Gold medal – first place	1995 Mar del Plata	Bantamweight
Silver medal – second place	1991 Havana	Bantamweight

Profile at external databases
- JudoInside.com: 766

Ewan Beaton (born July 13, 1969, in Edmonton, Alberta) is a male judoka from Canada. His daughter Evelyn Beaton also competes in Judo.

He claimed the silver medal in the Men's Bantamweight (– 60 kg) division at the 1991 Pan American Games in Havana, Cuba. In the final he was defeated by Brazil's Shigueto Yamasaki. Four years later he captured the gold medal.

Beaton represented his native country at the 1992 and the 1996 Summer Olympics. He was affiliated with the University of Manitoba.

Coaching career:

- 1997 to 2000 High Performance Coach Judo Saskatchewan
- 1999 to 2001 Junior National Coach Judo Canada
- 2001 to 2001 High Performance Coach Judo Manitoba
- 2001 to 2008 Coach Coordinator Judo Canada (Team Manager)
- 2008 to 2015 High Performance Coach Judo Saskatchewan
- 2004 Olympic Games Canadian Judo Coach
- 2008 Olympic Games Canadian Judo Team Leader
- 2015 to Current Alberta Regional Training Center Coach

== See also ==
- Judo in Manitoba
- Judo in Saskatchewan
- Judo in Canada
- List of Canadian judoka
