= Maingon =

Maingon is a French surname. Notable people with the surname include:

- Charles Maingon (1942–2018), Canadian judoka and professor
- Guy Maingon (born 1948), French cyclist
- Xavier Maingon (born 1980), writer and director
