= Vincent Grifo =

Canadian judoka

Personal information
- Born: August 14, 1943 (age 81); Montreal, Quebec
- Occupation: Judoka

Sport
- Country: Canada
- Sport: Judo
- Rank: 8th dan black belt
- Club: Club de judo Métropolitain

Profile at external databases
- JudoInside.com: 44797

Vincent Grifo (born 14 August 1943) is a Canadian judoka who represented Canada in the 1969 World Judo Championships in the -80 kg category. He also coached the Canadian Olympic judo team in 1984, was an Olympic referee in 1980, 1988, and 1992, was President of Judo Canada from 2008-2012, and was added to the Judo Canada Hall of Fame in 2005. He is currently the technical director at the Club de judo Métropolitain in Montreal, Quebec, which he founded in 1968.

== See also ==
- Judo in Quebec
- Judo in Canada
- List of Canadian judoka
