= Robin Chapman (judoka) =

American judoka (born 1957)

Robin Chapman Chow (born December 17, 1957) is an American former competitive judoka.

== Early life and education ==
Chapman was born in Pittsburgh and first competed nationally in judo for the University of Pittsburgh.

== Career ==
Chapman was a 5-time medalist in U.S. national judo championships, gold medalist in 1981 and 1983.

In international competition, she was a 6-time medalist. She won a gold medal at the 1983 Pan American Games in the Women's Half Middleweight class, and placed 5th in her class in the 1982 Women's World Judo Championships.

== Personal life ==
In 1988, Chapman married Greg Chow, an orthopedist and fellow judoka. They have three children, all whom qualified at the 2008 Olympic trials, and live in Honolulu, where they assist at Hawaii Tenri Judo Club under Hiroshi Toriyumi.
