= Marie-Hélène Chisholm =

Canadian judoka

Personal information
- Nationality: Canada
- Born: 8 January 1979 (age 47) Port-Cartier, Quebec
- Occupation: Judoka

Sport
- Sport: Judo
- Rank: 4th dan black belt

Profile at external databases
- JudoInside.com: 782

Marie-Hélène Chisholm (born January 8, 1979, in Port-Cartier, Quebec) is a Canadian judoka. She won a gold medal at the 2002 A Tournament in Sofia, Bulgaria in the 70 kg category.

== See also ==
- Judo in Quebec
- Judo in Canada
- List of Canadian judoka
