= Mark Berger (judoka) =

Canadian judoka

Personal information
- Born: January 3, 1954 (age 72) Chernivtsi, Ukrainian SSR, Soviet Union
- Occupation: Judoka
- Height: 1.85 m (6 ft 1 in)
- Weight: 116 kg (256 lb) (1984)
- Website: www.bergerjudo.ca

Sport
- Country: Canada
- Sport: Judo, Sambo
- Rank: 8th dan black belt
- Club: West Kildonan Judo Club; Ralph Brown Judo Club
- Coached by: Mamoru Oye

Achievements and titles
- Olympic Games: (bronze) (1984)
- World Champ.: 5th (1983)
- Pan American Champ.: (1985)
- Commonwealth Games: (silver) (1986)
Medal record
Men's judo
Representing Canada
Olympic Games
Bronze medal – third place	1984 Los Angeles	+95 kg
Pan American Games
Gold medal – first place	1983 Caracas	+95 kg
Pan American Championships
Bronze medal – third place	1985 Havana	+95 kg
Commonwealth Games
Silver medal – second place	1986 Edinburgh	+95 kg
Maccabiah Games
Gold medal – first place	1981 Israel	Heavyweight
Gold medal – first place	1985 Israel	Heavyweight
Men's Sambo
World Championships
Silver medal – second place	1988 Montreal	+100 kg

Profile at external databases
- IJF: 40427
- JudoInside.com: 769
- Updated on June 19, 2023

Mark Berger (born January 3, 1954) is a Ukrainian-born Canadian judoka. He won the gold medal in the men's heavyweight judo event at the 1983 Pan American Games and a bronze medal at the 1984 Summer Olympics. He also competed in sambo, winning silver at the 1988 World Championships.

Berger was born in Ukraine and became a Canadian citizen in the late 1970s. He was inducted into the Manitoba Sports Hall of Fame in 1994.

== Judo career ==
Berger immigrated to Canada from Ukraine through Vienna, Austria where he waited for the visa to go through in 1977. His Canadian career in Judo took off in 1978 when he won a gold medal in the Western Canada Summer Games.

=== National titles ===
He won the Canadian national title in 1980, 1981, 1983, 1984, and 1986.

=== World Championships ===
He finished 6th in the World Championships in 1981, and 5th in 1984.

=== Maccabiah Games ===
Berger, who is Jewish, won gold medals in the heavyweight division in the 1981 Maccabiah Games (in wrestling, and a silver medal in judo) and the 1985 Maccabiah Games in Israel, and also competed for Canada in judo in the 1997 Maccabiah Games.

=== Commonwealth Games ===
In 1986, he won the silver medal in the +95 kg weight category at the judo demonstration sport event as part of the 1986 Commonwealth Games.

=== Pan American Games ===
Berger won a gold medal at the 1983 Pan American Games, and was voted the province's Athlete of the Year.

=== Olympics ===
In 1984 at the Los Angeles Olympics, he earned a bronze medal in judo in the heavyweight division. He defeated Radomir Kovacevic of Yugoslavia to win the bronze medal.

=== Hall of Fame ===
He was inducted in 1994 into the Manitoba Sports Hall of Fame.

In 1996 he was inducted into the Judo Canada Hall of Fame.

== Miscellaneous ==
- Berger is currently a coach in Canada.
- Berger coached both the men's and women's judo teams at the Maccabiah Games in 2001.
- He is also an international referee.
- Berger holds a 8th degree black belt in judo, as well as 3-time Master of Sport ranking in wrestling.
- He placed 2nd at the 1988 World Sambo Championships.
- Berger is currently teaching in Ralph Brown School as a gym teacher, having since retired from teaching at Ralph Brown school.

== See also ==
- Judo in Manitoba
- Judo in Canada
- List of Canadian judoka
- List of prominent Jewish judoka
