= Tom Thomson (judoka) =

Canadian judoka (born 1947)

Personal information
- Born: May 7, 1947 (age 79) Hamilton, Ontario
- Occupation: Judoka

Sport
- Country: Canada
- Sport: Judo
- Club: Brantford Judo Club
- Now coaching: Justin Karn, Bill Morgan, Tim Rees, Tony Walby
- Updated on 3 September 2012

Tom Thomson (born May 7, 1947) is a Canadian judoka, coach, and head instructor at the Brantford Judo Club in Brantford, Ontario, who has been the head coach of the Canadian Paralympic Judo team since the 2000 Paralympic Games in Sydney. In 2006 Thomson won the Petro-Canada Coaching Excellence Award for his work in the promotion and development of Visually Impaired Judo in Canada, and in 2010 he was recognized with a Special Contribution award at an Elite Coaching Symposium for Ontario in Toronto.

Thomson, who has been practising Judo for 34 years, established the Brantford Judo Club in 1984 and remained a competitor himself until 1992, when he shifted his focus to coaching. The fact that the W. Ross Macdonald School for the Blind is located in Brantford has provided him with the opportunity to work with many visually impaired students.

== See also ==
- Judo in Canada
- List of Canadian judoka
