= Timothy Rees (judoka) =

Paralympic judoka

Personal information
- Born: July 24, 1980 (age 45) Kingston, Ontario
- Occupation: Judoka
- Height: 1.78 m (5 ft 10 in)
- Weight: 100 kg (220 lb) (2012)

Sport
- Country: Canada
- Sport: Judo
- Disability: Blind
- Disability class: B2
- Club: Victoria Judo Club
- Coached by: Tom Thompson
Medal record
Paralympic judo
Representing Canada
Parapan American Games
Bronze medal – third place	2011 Guadalajara	-100kg

Profile at external databases
- JudoInside.com: 89848
- Updated on 29 March 2021

Timothy Rees (born 24 July 1980) is a Canadian judoka and academic who represented Canada in Judo at the 2012 Paralympics in the -100 kg category. He was eliminated in the first round by Britain's Joe Ingram.

Rees won bronze at the 2011 Parapan American Games in the under -100 kg category. He holds a PhD in applied mathematics and worked as a postdoctoral research fellow at the University of Victoria. In 2015 he began work in industry, and he currently serves as the Chief Scientist at Allsalt Maritime Corporation.

== See also ==
- Judo in Canada
- List of Canadian judoka
