= Jacob Flores =

American judoka (born 1978)

Personal information
- Born: July 22, 1978 (age 47)
- Occupation: Judoka

Sport
- Sport: Judo
Medal record
Representing the United States
Pan American Games
Bronze medal – third place	1995 Mar del Plata	Flyweight

Profile at external databases
- JudoInside.com: 6730

Jacob "Jake" Flores (born July 22, 1978) is a retired American judoka who won a bronze medal in the flyweight (– 56 kg) division at the 1995 Pan American Games.
