= Sandra Greaves =

Canadian judoka (born 1963)

Personal information
- Born: 17 June 1963 (age 63)
- Occupation: Judoka

Sport
- Sport: Judo
Medal record
Women's judo
Representing Canada
Pan American Games
Gold medal – first place	1987 Indianapolis	Middleweight

Profile at external databases
- JudoInside.com: 9610

Sandra Greaves (born 17 June 1963 in St. Boniface, Manitoba) is a retired judoka from Canada, who won the gold medal in the women's middleweight (– 66 kg) competition at the 1987 Pan American Games, and many more nation-wide competitions. She was also the first female judoka to represent Canada at the Olympics, competing in both 1988 and 1992.

== See also ==
- Judo in Ontario
- Judo in Canada
- List of Canadian judoka
