= Phil Takahashi =

Canadian judoka (1957–2020)

Personal information
- Born: June 12, 1957 Toronto, Ontario, Canada
- Died: June 15, 2020 (aged 63) Ottawa, Ontario, Canada
- Occupation: Judoka

Sport
- Country: Canada
- Sport: Judo
- Rank: 7th dan black belt
- Club: Takahashi Dojo
Medal record
Men's Judo
World Judo Championships
Bronze medal – third place	1981	-60 kg
Pan American Games
Bronze medal – third place	1979	-60 kg
Bronze medal – third place	1983	-60 kg

Profile at external databases
- JudoInside.com: 871

Philip Masato Takahashi (June 12, 1957 – June 15, 2020) was a judoka from Canada, who represented his native country at two consecutive Summer Olympics (1984 and 1988). He twice won a bronze medal at the Pan American Games during his career in the bantamweight division (– 60 kg), in 1979 and 1983. His greatest achievement came as a bronze medal at the 1981 World Championships. In 1986, he won the bronze medal in the 60 kg weight category at the judo demonstration sport event as part of the 1986 Commonwealth Games.

He is the son of Masao and June Takahashi. He ran Takahashi Dojo in Ottawa, Ontario teaching Judo, Karate and other forms of martial arts. He also taught both English and Physical Education at Confederation High School (Ottawa). He held the rank of 7th dan in Judo. Takahashi died of cancer in 2020 at the age of 63.

== See also ==
- Judo in Ontario
- Judo in Canada
- List of Canadian judoka
