= Sophie Roberge =

Canadian Olympic judoka

Personal information
- Born: 18 October 1973 (age 53)
- Occupation: Judoka

Sport
- Sport: Judo

Profile at external databases
- JudoInside.com: 861

Sophie Roberge (born October 18, 1973 in Quebec City, Quebec) is a Canadian former judoka who competed in the 2000 Summer Olympics.

== See also ==
- Judo in Canada
- List of Canadian judoka
