= Alan Sakai =

Canadian judoka

Personal information
- Nationality: Canadian
- Born: 21 November 1954 (age 70); Vancouver, British Columbia, Canada
- Occupation: Judoka

Sport
- Sport: Judo

Profile at external databases
- IJF: 54471
- JudoInside.com: 8737

Alan Sakai (born 21 November 1954) is a Canadian judoka. He competed in the men's lightweight event at the 1972 Summer Olympics.

== See also ==
- Judo in Canada
- List of Canadian judoka
