= Joe Meli =

Canadian judoka (born 1956)

Personal information
- Born: 20 March 1956 (age 70) Lethbridge, Alberta
- Occupation: Judoka

Sport
- Sport: Judo
Medal record
Representing Canada
Men's Judo
Pan American Games
Bronze medal – third place	1979 San Juan	Open Class

Profile at external databases
- JudoInside.com: 9910

Joe Meli (born March 20, 1956, in Lethbridge, Alberta) is a retired judoka from Canada, who represented his native country at three Summer Olympics: 1976, 1984 and 1988. He won the bronze medal at the 1979 Pan American Games in the men's open class division. In 1986, he won the silver medal in the 95 kg weight category at the judo demonstration sport event as part of the 1986 Commonwealth Games.

== See also ==
- Judo in Alberta
- Judo in Canada
- List of Canadian judoka
