= Alison Webb =

Canadian judoka (born 1961)

Personal information
- Born: October 25, 1961 (age 64) Montreal, Quebec, Canada
- Occupation: Judoka
- Height: 165 cm (5 ft 5 in)
- Weight: 71 kg (157 lb)

Sport
- Sport: Judo
Medal record
Women's Judo
Representing Canada
Pan American Games
Silver medal – second place	1987 Indianapolis	Half-Heavyweight
Bronze medal – third place	1991 Havana	Half-Heavyweight

Profile at external databases
- IJF: 53894
- JudoInside.com: 882

Alison Webb (born October 25, 1961) is a retired judoka from Canada, who won the silver medal in the women's half-heavyweight (– 72 kg) competition at the 1987 Pan American Games. She represented her native country at the 1992 Summer Olympics in Barcelona, Spain.

== See also ==
- Judo in Quebec
- Judo in Canada
- List of Canadian judoka
