= Nancy Filteau =

Canadian judoka (born 1962)

Personal information
- Born: 3 April 1962 (age 64) Swift Current, Saskatchewan, Canada
- Occupation: Judoka

Sport
- Sport: Judo
Medal record
Representing Canada
Pan American Games
Silver medal – second place	1983 Caracas	Half-heavyweight
Bronze medal – third place	1995 Mar del Plata	Heavyweight

Profile at external databases
- JudoInside.com: 9426

Nancy Filteau (née Jewitt; born 3 April 1962) is a Canadian judoka. She competed in the women's heavyweight event at the 1996 Summer Olympics.

== See also ==
- Judo in Canada
- List of Canadian judoka
