= Frazer Will =

Canadian judoka (born 1982)

Personal information
- Born: May 10, 1982 (age 43); Star City, Saskatchewan
- Occupation: Judoka
- Height: 1.45 m (4 ft 9 in)
- Weight: 62 kg (137 lb) (2008)

Sport
- Country: Canada
- Sport: Judo

Profile at external databases
- JudoInside.com: 17729
- Updated on 8 September 2012

Frazer Will (born May 10, 1982 in Star City, Saskatchewan) is a Canadian judoka, who won gold medals at the 2006 and 2007 Pan American Judo Championships, the 2007 Chinese Open and four national championships in the lightweight (60 kg) division. He finished in 7th place in his division at the 2008 Summer Olympics in Beijing.

== See also ==
- Judo in Canada
- List of Canadian judoka
