= Louis Jani =

Canadian judoka (born 1957)

Personal information
- Born: 6 December 1957 (age 68)
- Occupation: Judoka

Sport
- Sport: Judo
Medal record
Representing Canada
Men's Judo
Pan American Games
Gold medal – first place	1979 San Juan	Middleweight
Gold medal – first place	1983 Caracas	Middleweight

Profile at external databases
- JudoInside.com: 812

Louis Jani (born 6 December 1957, in Montreal, Quebec) is a judoka from Canada, who represented his native country at two consecutive Summer Olympics: 1984 and 1988. He had unfortunately missed the 1980 Moscow Olympics due to Canada's boycott. Jani twice won the gold medal at the Pan American Games (1979 and 1983) in the middleweight division (– 86 kg). Competing as a member of Team Canada for 15 years, Jani went on to become the Technical Director for Judo Canada and eventually the National Coach. As National Coach he led the Canadian team at the 2000 Olympic Summer Games in Sydney, Australia, where Nicolas Gill won a silver medal.

== See all ==
- Judo in Canada
- List of Canadian judoka
