= 1997 Maccabiah Games =

15th edition of Jewish multi-sport event

15th Maccabiah
- Host city: Tel Aviv, Israel
- Nations: 33
- Athletes: 5,500
- Events: 34
- Torchbearers: Kerri Strug; Miki Berkovich
- Main venue: Ramat Gan Stadium

The 15th Maccabiah Games was an international Jewish multi-sport event held in Israel in 1997, featuring over 5,000 athletes from 33 countries. New sports for the Games included beach volleyball, ice hockey, and taekwondo.

The 1997 Maccabiah was marred by a bridge collapse ahead of the opening ceremony, resulting in the deaths of four members of the Australian delegation and injuring 60 others.

== History ==
The Maccabiah Games were first held in 1932. In 1961, they were declared a "Regional Sports Event" by, and under the auspices and supervision of, the International Olympic Committee. Among other Olympic and world champions, swimmer Mark Spitz won 10 Maccabiah gold medals before gaining his first of nine Olympic gold medals.

== Bridge collapse ==
The Games were marred by the collapse of the bridge, causing some athletes on the bridge who were marching into the Ramat Gan Stadium in Tel Aviv District for the Opening Ceremony to fall into the highly polluted Yarkon River; the polluted waters were considered a major factor in the deaths and injuries. Four Australians, Greg Small, Elizabeth Sawicki, Yetty Bennett, and Warren Zines, were killed when the bridge, supporting the Australian delegation, collapsed. Sixty others were injured.

After the accident, both the Opening Ceremony and the Games themselves continued with spectators in the stadium not given any information as to what had happened. The ceremony was delayed, and then only the torch lighting aspect of the ceremony took place. Spectators became aware that something was wrong when none of the scheduled events took place, including the march of the athletes, and when they listened to the radio. Many inquests were completed into the collapse of the bridge by both Israeli and Australian authorities and Yoram Eyal was found guilty of criminal negligence. To commemorate the tenth anniversary of the disaster, on July 20, 2007, a ceremony was held at Tel Aviv's Yarkon Park.

== Notable competitors ==
In track and field, Michael Halika of Israel, a future Olympian and World Championship bronze medalist, won the 800m freestyle and the 400m individual medley, among a total of 5 individual and 2 team gold medals in the juniors. Israeli Yoav Bruck won gold medals in the 50-meter freestyle and 100-meter freestyle.

American 1992 Olympian Tamara Levinson earned 5 golds in rhythmic gymnastics. David Bluthenthal and Ryan Lexer won a gold medal in basketball with Team USA. American Stuart Krohn won a gold medal in men's rugby team.

Daniela Krukower from Argentina won a silver medal in judo at U66. Israeli Gil Ofer won a gold medal in judo in the U78, and Israeli Ariel Ze'evi won a bronze medal in the U95. Canadian Olia Berger won a bronze medal for Canada in judo in the O72, and Canadian Olympic bronze medalist Mark Berger competed in judo.

In ice hockey, Team Canada won the gold medal, with National Hockey League players David Nemirovsky and Brian Wilks, as well as players Greg Gardner, Adam Henrich, Michael Henrich, Mikhail Nemirovsky, and Cory Pecker. Hockey player Billy Jaffe was team captain for the silver medal-winning Team USA, which also had on the team National Hockey League defenseman Mike Hartman and Gabe Polsky.

Australian first-class cricketer Michael Klinger won a gold medal, when he was 17 years old. Australian Jonathan Moss competed in cricket.

Shawn Lipman was the flag bearer for the U.S., represented the United States in rugby union, was team captain, and was selected as MVP of the Rugby Event, as the team won a gold medal.

Canada's Olympian Peter Bakonyi won a silver medal.

In soccer, Lev Kirshner played for the United States.

Olympic long-distance runner Dan Middleman competed for the U.S. Tennis player Dave Abelson competed for Canada. David Zalcberg competed for Australia in table tennis. Olympic champion sabre fencer Vadym Gutzeit competed for Ukraine.

== Participating communities ==
The number in parentheses indicates the number of participants that community contributed.

- Australia (400)
- Austria
- Brazil
- Canada
- Chile
- Colombia
- Costa Rica
- Croatia
- Czech Republic
- Finland
- France
- Georgia
- Hungary
- Israel
- Kyrgyzstan
- Lithuania
- Malta
- Mexico
- Moldova
- Netherlands
- New Zealand
- Norway
- Panama
- Paraguay
- Poland
- Portugal
- Romania
- Russia
- Singapore
- Slovakia
- Spain
- Sweden
- Switzerland
- South Africa
- Turkey
- United Kingdom
- United States
