= Lyne Poirier =

Canadian judoka (born 1968)

Personal information
- Born: June 16, 1968 (age 58)
- Occupation: Judoka

Sport
- Sport: Judo
Medal record
Women's Judo
Representing Canada
Pan American Games
Bronze medal – third place	1987 Indianapolis	Extra-Lightweight

Profile at external databases
- JudoInside.com: 854

Lyne Poirier (born June 16, 1968 in Port-Cartier, Quebec) is a retired judoka from Canada, who won the bronze medal in the women's extra-lightweight (– 48 kg) competition at the 1987 Pan American Games. She represented her native country at the 1992 Summer Olympics in Barcelona, Spain. In 1986, she won the bronze medal in the 48 kg weight category at the judo demonstration sport event as part of the 1986 Commonwealth Games.

== See also ==
- Judo in Quebec
- Judo in Canada
- List of Canadian judoka
