= Yoshio Senda =

Canadian judoka (1922–2009)

Personal information
- Nickname: Yosh
- Nationality: Canadian
- Born: February 14, 1922 Mission, British Columbia
- Died: September 9, 2009 (aged 87) Lethbridge, Alberta
- Occupation: Judoka

Sport
- Country: Canada
- Sport: Judo
- Rank: 9th dan black belt
- Club: Lethbridge Kyodokan Judo Club

Yoshio Senda CM (14 February 1922 – 9 September 2009) was a Canadian judoka, Member of the Order of Canada, Canada's first kudan (ninth-degree black belt) in Judo, and founder of the Lethbridge Kyodokan Judo Club.

Senda was forcibly relocated from Mission to Lethbridge during World War II.

In 1989, the University of Lethbridge awarded an honorary Doctor of Law degree (Hon. LL.D.) to Yoshio Senda. In 2004, Senda's daughter-in-law Jane Senda published a biography of her father-in-law and history of his club titled Kyodokan: the story of the Kyodokan Judo Club and the founder, Dr. Yoshio Senda.

== Early life ==
He worked as a farmer, employed by his father.

== Publications ==
- Senda, Yosh (11 December 2024). "Judo". The Canadian Encyclopedia. Historica–Dominion Institute.

== See also ==
- Judo in Alberta
- Judo in Canada
- List of Canadian judoka
