= Soraia André =

Brazilian judoka (born 1964)

Personal information
- Born: August 9, 1964 (age 61)
Medal record
Women's judo
Representing Brazil
Pan American Games
| Gold medal – first place | 1987 Indianapolis | Half Heavyweight |
| Bronze medal – third place | 1983 Caracas | Heavyweight |
| Bronze medal – third place | 1991 Havana | Open Class |

Soraia André César (born August 9, 1964) is a female judoka from Brazil. She competed for her native country at the 1992 Summer Olympics in Barcelona, Spain, where she was defeated in the first round of the repêchage.

In 1980, André participated in the first World Judo Championships in New York, where she lost in the first round. At the 1983 Pan American Games in Caracas, Venezuela, André won the bronze medal in the heavyweight division.

André also competed at the 1988 Summer Olympics, when women's judo was a demonstration sport. She won a bronze medal at the 1991 Pan American Games in the Women's Heavyweight (+ 72 kg), after having gained gold four years earlier in Indianapolis, United States.
