= Masao Takahashi =

Canadian judoka (1929–2020)

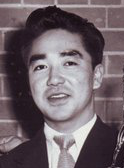
- Takahashi in 1950

Personal information
- Nickname: Mas
- Born: 24 June 1929 Stave Falls, British Columbia, Canada
- Died: 14 February 2020 (aged 90) Ottawa, Ontario, Canada
- Occupation: Judoka

Sport
- Country: Canada
- Sport: Judo
- Rank: 8th dan black belt
- Club: Takahashi Dojo

Masao Takahashi (June 24, 1929 – February 14, 2020) was a Canadian judoka, author, coach, and founder of the Takahashi School of Martial Arts (Est. 1969) in Ottawa, Ontario. He was involved in judo for more than 70 years, and was ranked hachi-dan (eighth-degree black belt), making him one of the highest ranked Canadian judoka. In 2002 he was decorated by the Emperor of Japan with the Order of the Sacred Treasure, Gold Rays with Rosette, in recognition of his service to improving the status of Japanese Canadians through his lifelong commitment to the promotion and development of Judo in Canada. He was inducted into the Judo Canada Hall of Fame in 1998 for his devotion to the development of judo in Canada. In 2005 Takahashi co-authored a book, Mastering Judo, with his family.

== Biography ==
Born in Stave Falls, British Columbia, Takahashi moved to the Kitsilano neighbourhood of Vancouver, British Columbia with his family in the late 1930s, where his father worked in a saw mill and his mother opened a day care centre. He was an outstanding athlete in high school, but his activities were limited following the outbreak of the Second World War. In March 1942, the government forced the family to give up their belongings and relocate as part of the internment of Japanese-Canadians due to fears that they would act against Canada on behalf of Japan. The Takahashis were moved to Raymond, Alberta to work as cheap labour in the sugar beet industry. The family stayed on a farm in a small house with no plumbing, and the children were prohibited from going to school. Takahashi and his friends continued to practice Judo during their years in Raymond under Yoshio Katsuta's supervision at a small Japanese Buddhist church. After the war was over, he returned to high school and graduated in 1948. In 1949, Takahashi joined the Royal Canadian Air Force, where he spent the next 22 years of his life. He retired from the Air Force in 1969 and began a second career by opening his dojo on Melrose Avenue near Wellington Street West in Ottawa.

== Family ==
Takahashi's wife and four children are also accomplished judoka who have made significant contributions to the development of Judo in Canada. His wife, June Takahashi, was one of the first women in Canada to earn a black belt in Judo, and is now ranked roku-dan (sixth-degree black belt), making her one of the highest-ranked women in the country. She coached Cameroonian judoka Françoise Nguele, who competed in the 2000 Olympic Games, and her approach to Judo is heavily influenced by the highest-ranked female judoka in history, Keiko Fukuda. Masao and June's children Allyn Takahashi, Phil Takahashi, Ray Takahashi, and Tina Takahashi, are all black belts who have been highly successful in competition, and three of them have participated in the Olympics: Phil as a competitor and Tina as a coach in Judo, and Ray as a competitor in wrestling.

== Awards ==
In 2002, Takahashi was decorated by the Emperor of Japan with the Order of the Sacred Treasure, Gold Rays with Rosette, in recognition of his service to improving the status of Japanese-Canadians through his lifelong commitment to the promotion and development of Judo in Canada.

== Popular culture ==
One of Takahashi's most famous students was former Canadian Prime Minister Pierre Elliott Trudeau. Trudeau began practicing Judo at Takahashi's sometime in the mid-1950s when he was in his mid-thirties, and by the end of the decade he was ranked ik-kyū (brown belt). Later, when he traveled to Japan as Prime Minister, he was promoted to sho-dan (first-degree black belt) by the Kodokan, and then promoted to ni-dan (second-degree black belt) by Takahashi before leaving office. Trudeau's three sons (Justin, Alexandre, & Michel) and the children of his successor, Brian Mulroney, also took lessons at Takahashi's dojo.

== Death ==
Takahashi died in his sleep on 14 February 2020, aged 90.

== Publications ==
- Takahashi, Masao; Family (2005). Mastering Judo. Windsor, Ontario: Human Kinetics. ISBN 073605099X.

== See also ==
- Judo in Ontario
- Judo in Manitoba
- Judo in Alberta
- Judo in Canada
- List of Canadian judoka
