= Niki Jenkins =

Canadian judoka (born 1973)

Personal information
- Born: July 27, 1973 (age 52) Selkirk, Manitoba
- Occupation: Judoka

Sport
- Sport: Judo
Medal record
Women's Judo
Representing Canada
Pan American Games
Silver medal – second place	1999 Winnipeg	Half-Heavyweight

Profile at external databases
- JudoInside.com: 814

Niki Jenkins (born July 27, 1973, in Selkirk, Manitoba) is a female judoka from Canada. She competed for Canada at the 1996 Summer Olympics and won a silver medal in the Women's Half-Heavyweight (under 78 kg) division at the 1999 Pan American Games. She trained with the Shidokan Judo Club in Montréal.

She is married to Neil Adams and has two daughters, Brooke and Taylor, and lives in Rugby.

== See also ==
- Judo in Canada
- List of Canadian judoka
