= Nathalie Gosselin =

Canadian judoka (born 1966)

Personal information
- Born: March 31, 1966 (age 60) Lévis, Quebec
- Occupation: Judoka

Sport
- Sport: Judo
Medal record
Women's Judo
Representing Canada
Pan American Games
Bronze medal – third place	1987 Indianapolis	Lightweight
Bronze medal – third place	1995 Mar del Plata	Half-Lightweight

Profile at external databases
- JudoInside.com: 802

Nathalie Gosselin (born March 31, 1966, in Lévis, Quebec) is a retired judoka from Canada, who won the bronze medal in the women's lightweight (– 56 kg) competition at the 1987 Pan American Games. She represented her native country at the 1996 Summer Olympics in Atlanta, Georgia, after having won the bronze medal in the women's half-lightweight division (– 52 kg) a year earlier at the 1995 Pan American Games. In 1986, she won the bronze medal in the 56 kg weight category at the judo demonstration sport event as part of the 1986 Commonwealth Games.

== See also ==
- Judo in Ontario
- Judo in Canada
- List of Canadian judoka
