= Judo in Manitoba =

- Country: Canada
- Governing body: Judo Manitoba; Judo Canada
- National team: Canadian Olympic team

The Japanese martial art and combat sport judo has been practised in the Canadian province of Manitoba since the 1940s.

== History ==
Judo was introduced to Canada in the early twentieth century by Japanese migrants, and was limited to British Columbia until the forced expulsion, internment, and resettlement of Japanese-Canadians after Japan entered the Second World War in 1941. Japanese Canadian expulsion and internment was pivotal in the development of Canadian judo because it forced judoka to settle in other parts of the country. Some returned to the Pacific coast after 1949, but most found new homes in other provinces. New dojos opened in the Prairies, Ontario, and Quebec, primarily in the mid-to-late 1940s, and the centre of Canadian judo shifted from Vancouver to Toronto, where a significant number of judoka had settled after the war. Many early dojos were housed at the local branch of the YMCA, which also provided short-term accommodation, assisted with finding employment, and coordinated social programs for resettled Japanese Canadians. Clubs at military bases, RCMP barracks, and universities were also common.

Glen and George Pridmore, two brothers and police officers from the St. James area of Winnipeg, started a nominal judo club at the Central YMCA in 1937, but they reportedly taught a mix of jujutsu and other unarmed combat techniques and called it 'judo' because it was a popular term at the time. The club appears to have closed at some point and then reopened in 1947. Tomatsu "Tom" Mitani, who was born in Japan and moved from British Columbia to Manitoba to avoid internment in 1942, visited the Pridmore's club in 1948 and assigned two of his ikkyū (first kyū / brown belt) students to assist them (it is unclear if Mitani had been teaching judo during the six years since he had arrived in Winnipeg, but the fact he had students suggests that he was). Glen Pridmore left Winnipeg in 1949, and by 1950 Mitani had taken over the YMCA club and established branches with the help of Ron Fulton, Jack Kelly, and Jimmy Iwabuchi at Carpiquet Barracks, the RCAF base, and the RCMP barracks on Portage Avenue. The branches lasted about a year, and in 1951 Mitani moved the YMCA club to the RCMP barracks. Bob Demby started another, short-lived judo club at the YMCA, which was followed by a self-defence class organised by Ron Fulton that slowly became a judo club over the years. In 1952, Mitani established The Manitoba Judo Institute, with the help of Harold Shimane and Noboru Shimizu, on the seventh floor of the McIntyre Block on Main Street. There was a club at the RCAF base again as early as 1956, organized by Flying Officer Vinsel and Leading Aircraftman Delasalle, and supported by Mitani (it may have operated sporadically or had different incarnations, as a 1960 article reports that it was founded by Masao Takahashi in 1958). The first club outside of Winnipeg was established at the Brandon YMCA in 1953 by Harold Starn, a former British special forces soldier who received his judo training from Japanese prisoners he guarded in Burma during the war.

== See also ==
- Judo in Canada
- List of Canadian judoka
