= Minoru Hatashita =

Canadian judoka (1919–1996)

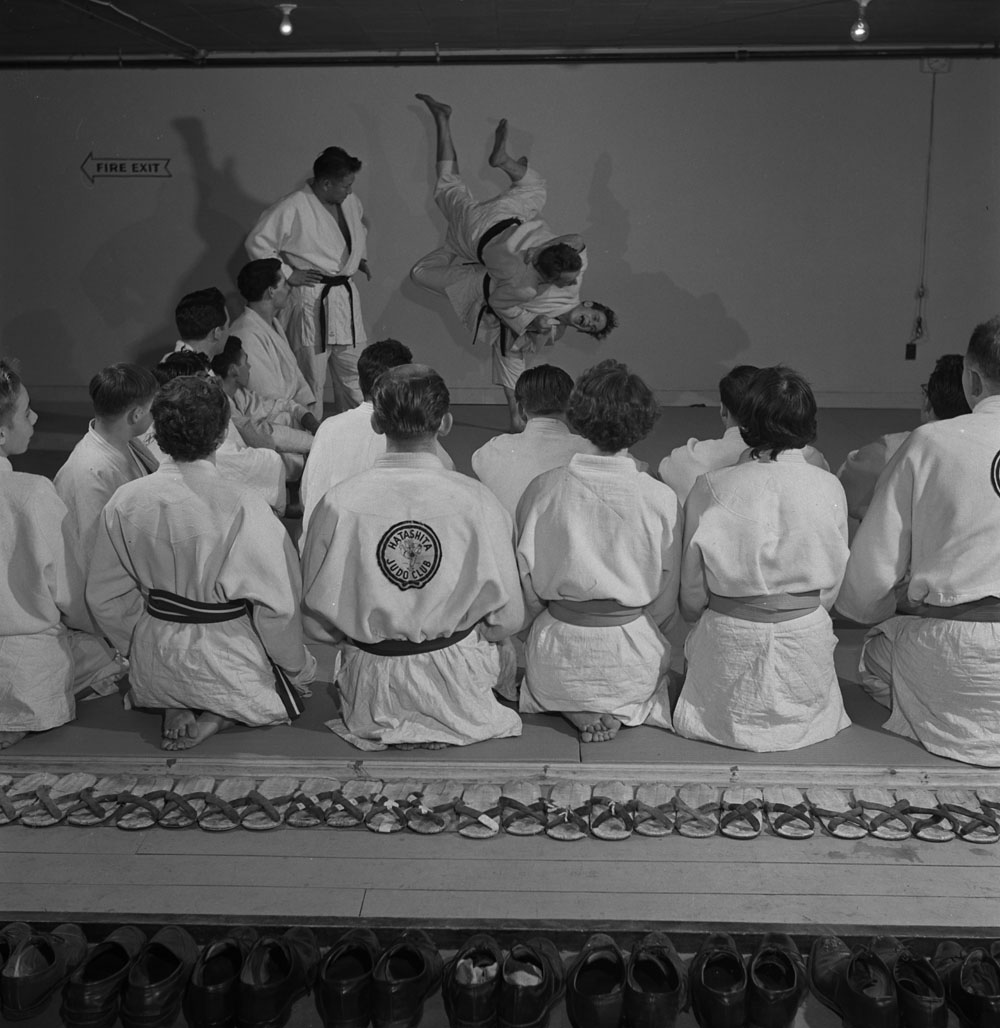
- Hatashita instructing a judo class in 1955

Personal information
- Nickname(s): Frank, Canada's Mr. Judo
- Born: 17 September 1919; Vancouver, British Columbia
- Died: 24 August 1996 (aged 76); Toronto, Ontario
- Occupation: Judoka

Sport
- Country: Canada
- Sport: Judo
- Rank: 8th dan black belt
- Club: Hatashita Judo Club
- Coached by: Shigetaka Sasaki; Atsumu Kamino

Minoru "Frank" Hatashita (17 September 1919 – 24 August 1996) was the first Canadian judoka to achieve the rank of hachidan (8th dan) and was deeply involved in the development and promotion of Judo in Canada. He was the President of the Canadian Kodokan Black Belt Association (now Judo Canada) for 18 years, President of the Pan-American Judo Union, Vice-President of the International Judo Federation, and Doug Rogers' coach at the 1964 Summer Olympics, where Rogers won silver. Hatashita was inducted into the Canadian Olympic Hall of Fame in 1975 and the Judo Canada Hall of Fame in 1996.

== See also ==
- Judo in Ontario
- Judo in Canada
- List of Canadian judoka
