= Taro Tan =

Canadian judoka (born 1967)

Personal information
- Born: 13 August 1967 (age 58) Montreal, Quebec, Canada
- Occupation: Judoka

Sport
- Sport: Judo
Medal record
Representing Canada
Pan American Games
Bronze medal – third place	1995 Mar del Plata	Half-lightweight

Profile at external databases
- JudoInside.com: 873

Taro Tan (born 13 August 1967) is a Canadian judoka. He competed in the men's half-lightweight event at the 1996 Summer Olympics.
