= Judo in British Columbia =

Overview of Judo in British Columbia

- Country: Canada
- Governing body: Judo BC; Judo Canada
- National team: Canadian Olympic team

The Japanese martial art and combat sport judo has been practised in the Canadian province of British Columbia since the early 1900s, and it was the only place in the country where judo was practised prior to the Second World War. The first long-term judo dojo in Canada, Tai Iku Dojo, was established by a Japanese immigrant named Shigetaka "Steve" Sasaki in Vancouver in 1924. Sasaki and his students opened several branch schools in British Columbia and even trained RCMP officers until 1942, when Japanese Canadians were expelled from the Pacific coast and either interned or forced to move elsewhere in Canada due to fears that they were a threat to the country after Japan entered the Second World War. When the war was over, the government gave interned Japanese Canadians two options: resettle in Canada outside of British Columbia or emigrate to Japan. Some returned to the Pacific coast after 1949, but most found new homes in other provinces. Those that did return, many of whom were fishermen, worked hard to rebuild the community that they had lost, and today there are about 50 judo clubs throughout the province.

== History ==
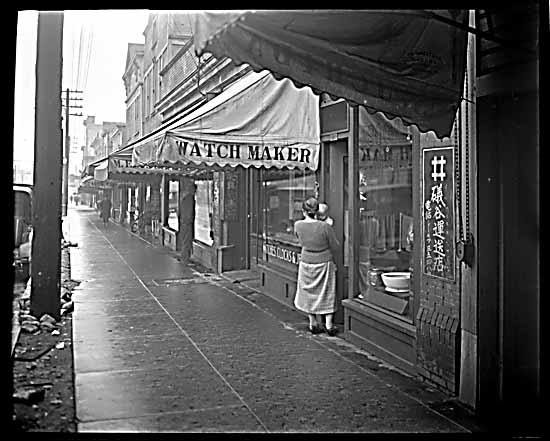
View of Powell Street in Vancouver's Japantown (1928)

Before World War II (1939 – 1945) most people from Japan or of Japanese ancestry in Canada (23,149 according to the 1941 census) lived in British Columbia. About a quarter of that population lived in Vancouver, and the majority of the Vancouver residents lived in the neighbourhood known as 'Japantown' or 'Little Tokyo', which was made up of about six blocks centred on Powell Street and bordered by Alexander, Jackson, Cordova, and Main. It was a distinct Japanese area with its own stores, banks, and theatres until all people of Japanese ancestry living within 100 miles (161 km) of the Pacific coast were expelled, their property was confiscated, and the majority were interned in 1942 (see 'World War II and Japanese internment' below). The area is now part of the Downtown Eastside.

There were several public 'jujitsu' exhibitions and matches in Vancouver beginning in 1906, which may have included or actually been judo since it was often referred to as 'Kano jujutsu' at the time. Judo may also have been practised privately in Vancouver as early as 1910, and Sataro Fujita reportedly taught judo in the city around 1914. Shinzo Takagaki, a Kodokan yondan (fourth dan) who promoted judo in many countries, reportedly moved to the United States with the intent of becoming a professional wrestler. He was admitted to Canada to study at the University of British Columbia in 1924, but never attended classes and instead competed in wrestling matches, taught judo, and also issued the first shodan (first dan) certificate in Canada to Kametaro Akiyama in 1925. Fujita and Takagaki did not settle in Canada, however, and neither established a long-term school.

=== Tai Iku Dojo ===
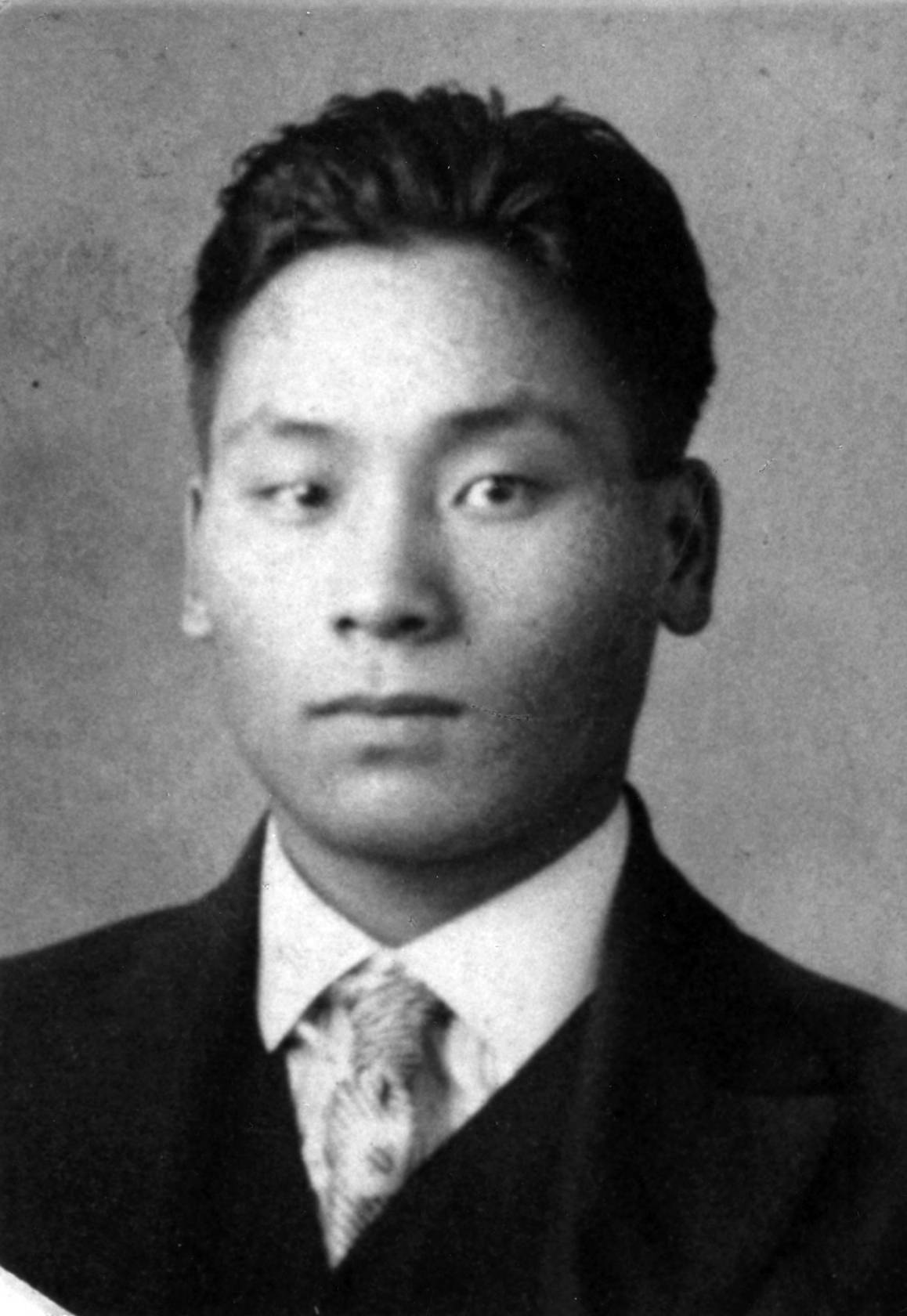
Photo of Shigetaka Sasaki, the 'Father of judo in Canada' taken around 1930

Shigetaka "Steve" Sasaki emigrated from Japan to Vancouver in 1922 at the age of 19 and worked as a shop assistant to study business. In 1923 he began attending local judo-versus-wrestling matches and was extremely disappointed to discover that they were fixed and badly misrepresented judo (it is unclear whether Takagaki was involved in any of the matches in question). Sasaki was nidan (second dan) and had been a judo instructor at Yonago High School in Japan, so he held a meeting with Vancouver's Japanese community to gauge their interest in establishing a non-profit dojo that adhered to judo's two fundamental principles: seiryoku zen'yō (精力善用, 'maximum efficiency, minimum effort' in Japanese) and jita kyōei (自他共栄, 'mutual welfare and benefit'). After a year of planning, meetings, and fundraising, Sasaki opened Tai Iku Dojo (体育道場, 'physical education training hall') in 1924.

It was difficult to secure an appropriate location and the first practices were held in the living room of Kanzo Ui, one of the dojo's sponsors, at 500 Alexander Street in Vancouver. A few months later it was relocated to a larger location in the 500 block of Powell Street (the dojo appears to have had more than one address on Powell Street over the years, and was recorded as 403 Powell in 1932). Over the next several years new branches of Tai Iku Dojo were established in Steveston (where Tomoaki Doi and Takeshi Yamamoto had already started a club but asked for Sasaki's help), Kitsilano, Fairview, Haney, Mission, Woodfibre, Chemainus, Victoria, Duncan, Whonnock, Hammond, and Vernon. Sasaki or his assistants helped with the instruction at all of the clubs.

=== RCMP training ===
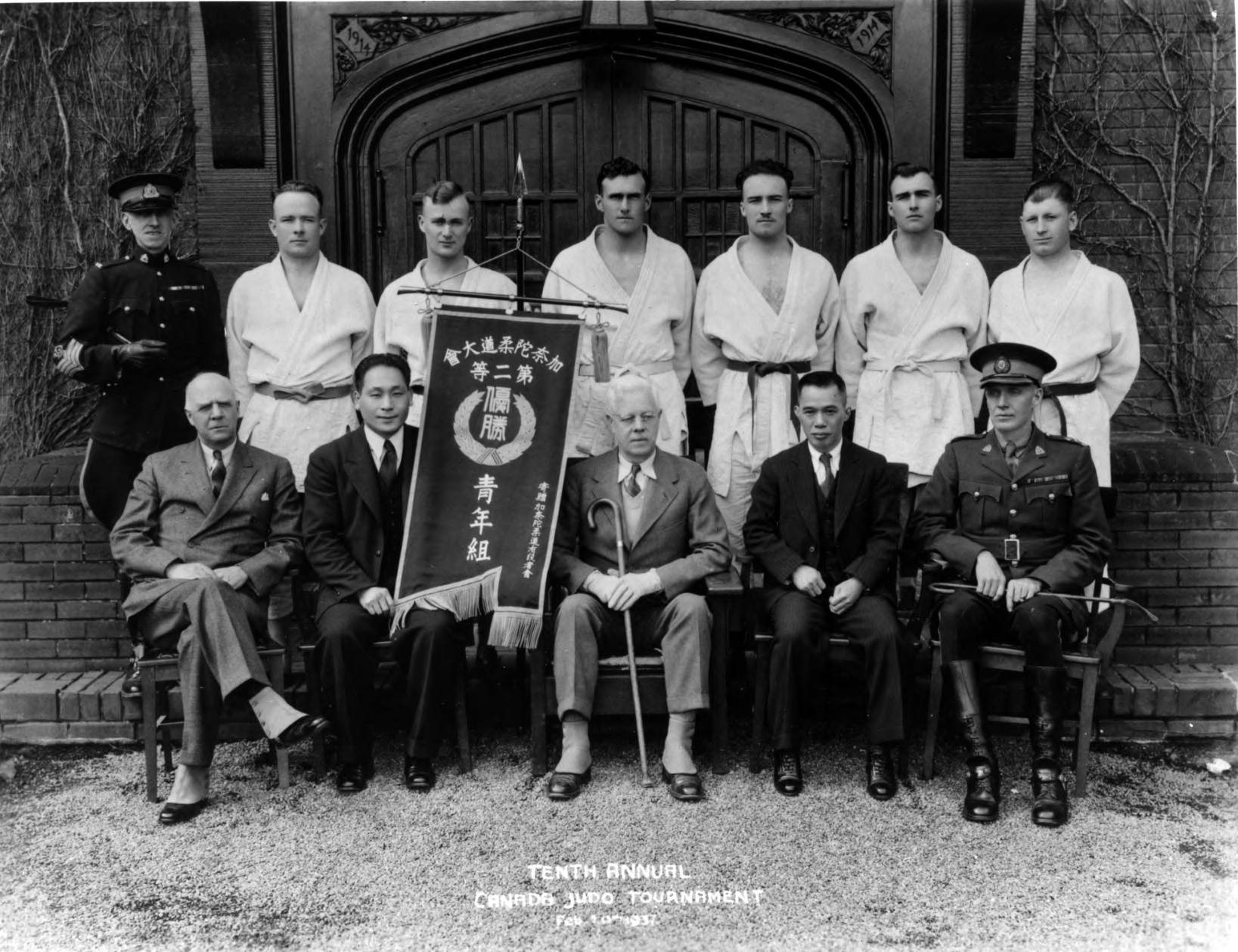
RCMP participants and officials at the 10th Annual Canadian Judo Championships in Vancouver in 1937. Front row, left to right: Superintendent Fowell, Shigetaka Sasaki, Assistant Commissioner Cadiz, Etsuji Morii, and Inspector Genan

For nearly a decade all of the judoka at Tai Iku Dojo's various branches were ethnically Japanese. In 1932, however, the commissioner of the Vancouver Royal Canadian Mounted Police (RCMP) detachment attended a judo tournament and was so impressed that he replaced his officer's boxing and wrestling training with judo. Sasaki saw this as an important opportunity to promote judo throughout Canada and taught the initial cohort of eleven RCMP officers personally at the detachment gymnasium at 33rd Avenue & Heather Street, on the site now known as the Heather Street Lands. This helped generate more interest in judo, and people from outside the Japanese-Canadian community began participating in tournaments in 1933. In 1936 all eleven officers in the first cohort were promoted to shodan, and in 1937 a six-man team of RCMP judoka placed second in a tournament. RCMP judo training ceased in 1941 after Japan entered the Second World War (see 'World War II and Japanese internment' below).

=== Jigoro Kano's visits to Canada ===
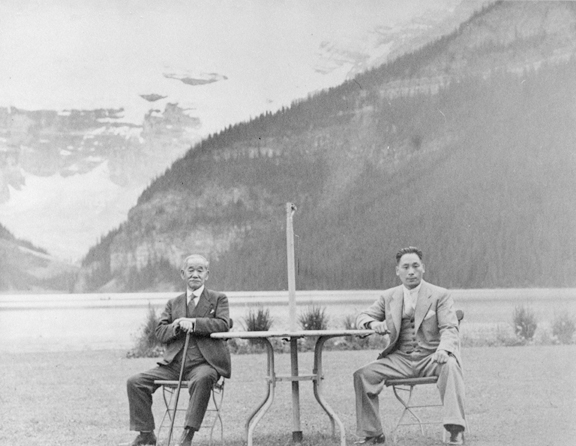
Jigoro Kano and Shigetaka Sasaki at Lake Louise, Alberta on their way to the Berlin Olympics in 1936

Jigoro Kano, the founder of Judo, visited Canada three times. During the first visit in 1932, when Kano was on his way back to Japan from the 1932 Summer Olympics in Los Angeles, he honoured Tai Iku Dojo by renaming it Kidokan (気道館, "place of intrinsic energy" in Japanese), and all other dojos in British Columbia became branches of Kidokan. The second visit was in 1936, during which he asked Sasaki to accompany him to Berlin to make a presentation to the International Olympic Committee (IOC) and participate in a subsequent judo demonstration tour in Germany, France, England, the United States, and Canada (Sasaki had to return to Vancouver after a month in Berlin to attend to his business and judo obligations). Kano's last visit to Canada was in 1938, on his way home from meetings with the IOC in Cairo. He died of pneumonia later that year on the Hikawa Maru, mid-voyage from Vancouver to Yokohama.

=== World War II and Japanese internment ===
Japan's attack on Pearl Harbor on 7 December 1941 began the war between the Japanese Empire and the Allies, including Canada. This sparked fears of a Japanese invasion on the Pacific coast in a context of already long-standing anti-Asian racism (Japantown was targeted during the 1907 anti-Asian riots in Vancouver, and most Japanese Canadians did not have the right to vote until 1949, for example). On 25 February 1942 the federal government invoked the War Measures Act to order the removal of all Japanese Canadians residing within 100 miles (160 km) of the Pacific coast, even though about 77% of them were British subjects (Canadian citizenship was not instituted until 1946) and 61% were Canada-born nisei.

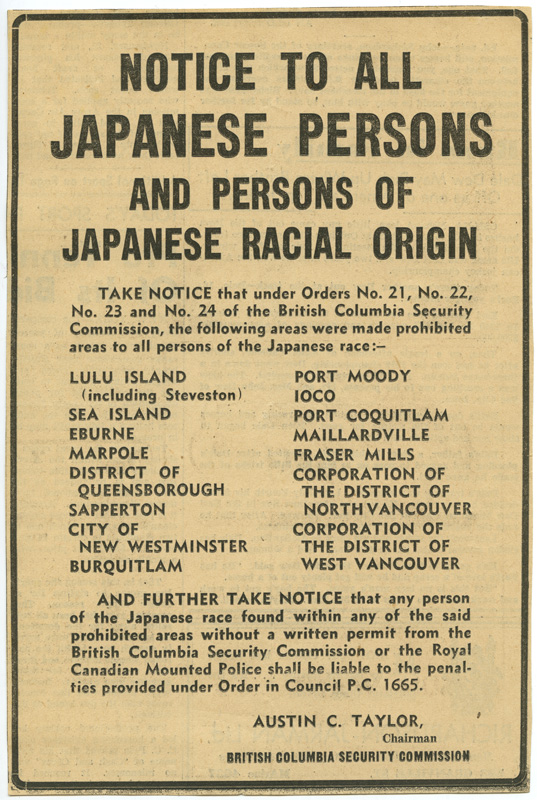
British Columbia Security Commission Japanese internment notice (1942)

21,000 Japanese Canadians (over 90% of the Japanese-Canadian population) were expelled from their homes, and their property and personal possessions were confiscated by the Custodian of Enemy Property. 700 men labelled as 'troublemakers' were sent to Prisoner of War Camp 101 in Angler, Ontario near Neys Provincial Park, 2,150 single men were sent to road labour camps, 3,500 people signed contracts to work on sugar beet farms outside British Columbia to avoid internment, and 3,000 were permitted to settle away from the coast at their own expense. The remaining 12,000 were relocated to government internment camps in the BC interior or elsewhere in Canada.

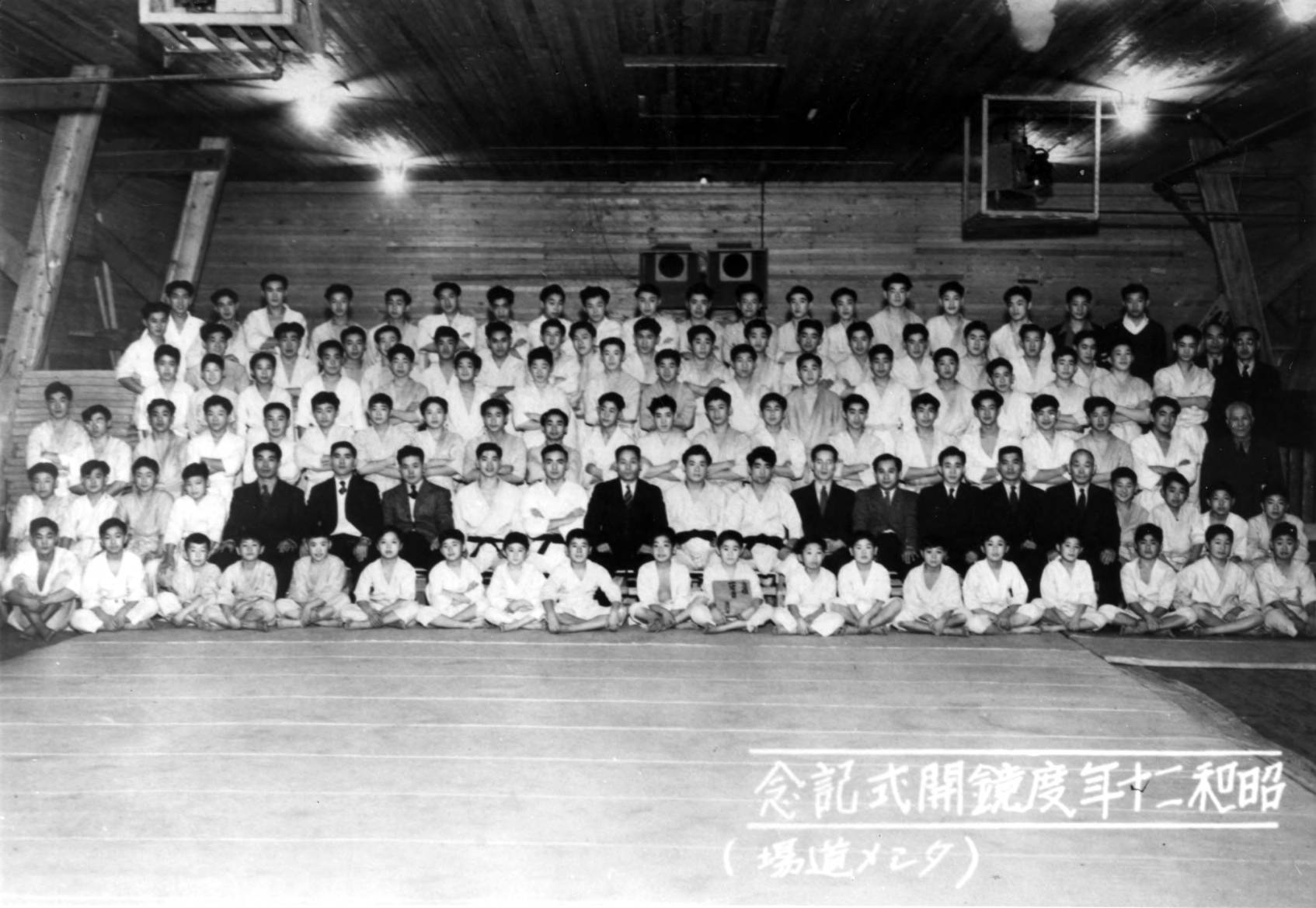
Judoka celebrating kagami biraki at Tashme Internment Camp

Judo played an important role in the life of many internees, and there were well-attended dojos at three camps: Tashme Internment Camp near Hope, British Columbia, Popoff Internment Camp in the Slocan Valley, British Columbia, and the Prisoner of War (POW) camp in Angler. Tashme, where Sasaki was head instructor, was the largest of the BC internment camps and many judoka were held there, reportedly at Sasaki's request and out of respect for his work with the RCMP. The head instructor at Popoff was Genichiro Nakahara, and Masato Ishibashi at the POW camp. Training was held on improvised tatami made from straw and canvas, with frequency ranging from twice a week at Tashme to daily at the POW camp. According to Robert Okazaki's diary from his time in the POW camp, "Despite food rationing, Mr. Masato Ishibashi and his judo students are excelling at their sport. Their training is awfully tough and their Kakegoe (sounds of hard practice) reverberates through the camp".

When the war ended in 1945 the government gave interned Japanese Canadians two options: resettlement outside of British Columbia or 'voluntary repatriation' to Japan (despite the fact that most Japanese Canadians had been born in Canada). The majority agreed to move elsewhere in Canada, but approximately 10,000 refused to move and the government issued an order to deport them. 4,000 people were deported to Japan before the policy was abandoned due to public opposition. Japanese Canadians were prevented from returning to the exclusion zone until 1949. By then most of them had established themselves in other places, and there was nothing to go back to anyway because the Custodian of Enemy Property had sold all of their property and belongings. In 1988, after more than 40 years of lobbying by activists, the Canadian government issued a formal apology to Japanese Canadians for their internment and partially compensated those who were still alive for their confiscated property.

=== Return to British Columbia ===
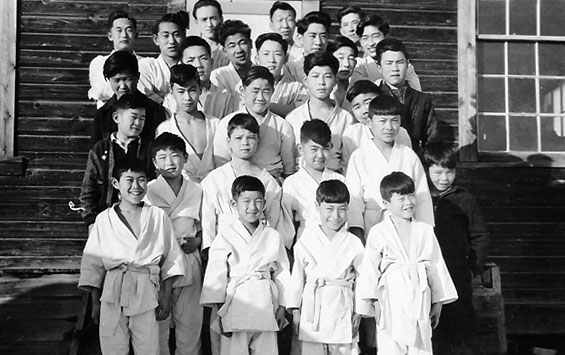
Vernon Judo Club in 1945

The Japanese-Canadian exclusion zone remained in effect until 1949 and judo did not return to the Pacific coast until two years later. Outside of the exclusion zone, the Vernon Judo Club was established with a police permit in 1944 by Yoshitaka Mori, who had been Hashizume's assistant in Mission (in a 1986 recollection, Shigetaka Sasaki wrote that in or around 1929 Mori went to Vernon as the head judo instructor for the Vernon Farmer's Association). This makes it the longest continuously operating judo club in Canada. Sasaki moved to Ashcroft in 1946 and opened a dojo there in 1948. The first dojo to reopen on the coast was the Vancouver Judo Club in 1951, in the old Ukrainian Hall at 600 East Cordova Street. The Steveston Judo Club reopened two years later in 1953, organized by Yonekazu "Frank" Sakai and Tomoaki "Tom" Doi with co-founders and instructors Seiichi Hamanishi, Takeo Kawasaki, Kunji Kuramoto, Yukio Mizuguchi, Kanezo Tokai, and Soichi Uyeyama, who were all local fishermen. After moving three times in three years, a major fundraising campaign led to the construction of a community centre in Steveston that opened in 1957, where the dojo remained until moving to the new Steveston Martial Arts Centre in 1971.

== See also ==
- Judo in Canada
- List of Canadian judoka
