= Rafael González (judoka) =

Mexican judoka (born 1958)

Personal information
- Nationality: Mexican
- Born: 24 August 1958 (age 66)

Sport
- Sport: Judo

Rafael González (born 24 August 1958) is a Mexican judoka. He competed at the 1980 Summer Olympics and the 1984 Summer Olympics.
