= Yoshio Katsuta =

Japanese-Canadian judoka

Personal information
- Born: 15 March 1904
- Died: 20 December 1997 (aged 93)
- Occupation: Judoka

Sport
- Sport: Judo

Yoshio "John" Katsuta (15 March 1904 – 20 December 1997) was a Japanese-Canadian judoka born in Okayama, Japan who founded Alberta's first Judo dojo in Raymond, Alberta in 1943, and was the first president of the Alberta Black Belt Association, founded in 1952. Katsuta was ranked roku-dan (sixth-degree black belt) and was the recipient of many honours and awards for his service to the community and promotion of Judo in Canada. He received the Canadian Centennial Medal in 1967 and the 125th Anniversary of the Confederation of Canada Medal in 1992, was awarded the Hokkaido Cup from the Governor of Japan in 1987, and was posthumously recognized with an Alberta Centennial Salute to Sport and Recreation Award in 2005. Katsuta was also inducted into the Raymond Sports Hall of Fame in 1987 and the Alberta Sports Hall of Fame in 2008, made a lifetime member of Judo Canada in 1983, and inducted into its Hall of Fame in 1996.

== See also ==
- Judo in Canada
- List of Canadian judoka
