= Fred Blaney =

Canadian judoka (born 1955)

Personal information
- Born: 14 November 1955 (age 69); Sudbury, Ontario, Canada
- Occupation: Judoka

Sport
- Sport: Judo

Profile at external databases
- JudoInside.com: 9911

Fred Blaney (born 14 November 1955) is a Canadian judoka. He competed in the men's open category event at the 1984 Summer Olympics.

== See also ==
- Judo in New Brunswick
- Judo in Canada
- List of Canadian judoka
