= Judo in Alberta =

- Country: Canada
- Governing body: Judo Alberta; Judo Canada
- National team: Canadian Olympic team

The Japanese martial art and combat sport judo has been practised in the Canadian province of Alberta since 1943.

== History ==
Judo was introduced to Canada in the early twentieth century by Japanese migrants, and was limited to British Columbia until the forced expulsion, internment, and resettlement of Japanese-Canadians after Japan entered the Second World War in 1941. Japanese Canadian expulsion and internment was pivotal in the development of Canadian judo because it forced judoka to settle in other parts of the country. Some returned to the Pacific coast after 1949, but most found new homes in other provinces. New dojos opened in the Prairies, Ontario, and Quebec, primarily in the mid-to-late 1940s, and the centre of Canadian judo shifted from Vancouver to Toronto, where a significant number of judoka had settled after the war. Many early dojos were housed at the local branch of the YMCA, which also provided short-term accommodation, assisted with finding employment, and coordinated social programs for resettled Japanese Canadians. Clubs at military bases, RCMP barracks, and universities were also common.

Alberta's first judo club was founded in 1943 in Raymond by Yoshio Katsuta and Yoshio Senda, both of whom moved from BC to Alberta to avoid being interned. Katsuta was born in Japan and had received his yondan (fourth dan) from the Kodokan before immigrating to Ocean Falls in 1937, and Senda was born in Mission and had earned his shodan (first dan) under Eichi "John" Hashizume and Yoshitaka Mori a few years before moving to Alberta. There were about 30 mostly Japanese Canadian students at the Raymond club, and practices were held in the reception room of the Raymond Buddhist Church. A year later, Hashizume (Senda's instructor in Mission) and a Mr. Kuramoto opened a dojo in Picture Butte. After the war, more than 300 displaced Japanese Canadians decided to stay in southern Alberta, and Senda established the Kyodokan Judo Club at the original Lethbridge YMCA building at 4th Avenue and 10th Street South in 1952.

== See also ==
- Judo in Canada
- List of Canadian judoka
