= Gerardo Padilla =

Mexican judoka (born 1959)

Personal information
- Nationality: Mexican
- Born: 23 March 1959 (age 66)

Sport
- Sport: Judo

Gerardo Padilla (born 23 March 1959) is a Mexican judoka. He competed at the 1976 Summer Olympics, 1980 Summer Olympics and the 1984 Summer Olympics.
