= List of Canadian judoka =

List of prominent Canadian judoka

This is a list of prominent Canadian judoka, including members of the Judo Canada Hall of Fame, lifetime members of Judo Canada, kōdansha (high dan-holders), all participants in the Olympics, Paralympics, and World Judo Championships, and coaches for those competitions.

== Judo Canada Hall of Fame ==
The following judoka are members of Judo Canada's Hall of Fame, which was created in 1996 to honour Canada's "ambassadors of judo". There are two categories: 'athletes' and 'builders'.

=== Athletes ===
==== 2023 ====
- Sophie Roberge

==== 2018 ====
- Glenn Beauchamp
- Amy Cotton
- Frazer Will

==== 2017 ====
- Lyne Poirier
- Nathalie Gosselin

==== 2014 ====
- Luce Baillargeon
- Michelle Buckingham
- Marie-Hélène Chisholm

==== 2013 ====
- Keith Morgan
- Ewan Beaton

==== 2012 ====
- Pier Morten

==== 2008 ====
- Nicolas Gill

==== 2001 ====
- Louis Jani

==== 2000 ====
- Rainer Fischer
- Sandra Greaves

==== 1999 ====
- Wayne Erdman

==== 1998 ====
- Fred Blaney
- Joe Meli
- Lorraine Methot
- Tina Takahashi

==== 1997 ====
- Brad Farrow

==== 1996 ====
- Mark Berger
- Kevin Doherty
- Doug Rogers
- Phil Takahashi

=== Builders ===
==== 2022 ====
- Roger Tremblay

==== 2019 ====
- Guy Sunada

==== 2015 ====
- Al Hadvick

==== 2014 ====
- Allan Sattin
- Joe Serianni

==== 2012 ====
- Serge Piquette

==== 2007 ====
- Jacques Lamade
- Giselle Gravel
- Céline Darveau

==== 2005 ====
- Vincent Grifo

==== 2004 ====
- Gérard Blanchet
- Yuzuru Kojima
- Perry Teale

==== 2003 ====
- Yves LeGal
- Carl Schell

==== 2001 ====
- Yeiji Inouye

==== 2000 ====
- Yoshitaka Mori
- Frank Sakai
- Daniel Tabouret

==== 1999 ====
- William Doherty
- Tomoaki Doi

==== 1998 ====
- Tomatsu Mitani
- Hiroshi Nakamura
- Masao Takahashi
- Satoru Tamoto

==== 1997 ====
- Leo Haunsberger
- Steve Kamino

==== 1996 ====
- Raymond Damblant
- Frank Hatashita
- Yoshio Katsuta
- Mamoru Oye
- Shigetaka Sasaki
- Yoshio Senda
- Masatoshi Umetsu
- Kenneth Whitney

== Lifetime members of Judo Canada ==
The following judoka were made lifetime members of Judo Canada in recognition of their major contributions to judo in Canada. Everyone in the Judo Canada Hall of Fame is also a lifetime member.

=== 2022 ===
- Roger Tremblay

=== 2019 ===
- Guy Sunada

=== 2018 ===
- Glenn Beauchamp
- Amy Cotton
- Frazer Will

=== 2017 ===
- Nathalie Gosselin
- Lyne Poirier

=== 2015 ===
- Al Hadvick

=== 2014 ===
- Luce Baillargeon
- Michelle Buckingham
- Marie-Hélène Chisholm
- Allan Sattin
- Joe Serianni

=== 2013 ===
- Keith Morgan
- Ewan Beaton

=== 2012 ===
- Pier Morten

=== 2011 ===
- Serge Piquette

=== 2008 ===
- Nicolas Gill

=== 2007 ===
- Céline Darveau
- Gisèle Gravel
- Jacques Lamade

=== 2005 ===
- Vincent Grifo

=== 2004 ===
- Gérard Blanchet
- James O'Sullivan

=== 2003 ===
- Yuzuru Kojima
- Yves LeGal
- Tom Mukai
- Momoru Oye
- Carl Schell

=== 2001 ===
- Yeiji Inouye
- Louis Jani
- Hiroshi Nakamura

=== 2000 ===
- Rainer Fischer
- Sandra Greaves
- Doug Rogers
- Daniel Tabouret

=== 1999 ===
- Wayne Erdman
- John Wright

=== 1998 ===
- Fred Blaney
- Joe Meli
- Lorraine Methot
- Tina Takahashi

=== 1997 ===
- William Doherty
- Brad Farrow

=== 1996 ===
- Mark Berger
- Kevin Doherty
- Tokio Kamino
- Phil Takahashi
- Goki Uemura
- Kenneth Whitney

=== 1994 ===
- Takeo Kawasaki
- Kunji Kuramoto
- Yonezuka Sakai

=== 1988 ===
- Joseph Lestrage

=== 1987 ===
- Leo Haunsberger
- Hisao Kuwada
- Yoshio Senda
- Masao Takahashi
- Harushi Tanigami

=== 1985 ===
- Frank Hatashita

=== 1984 ===
- Tomoaki Doi
- Yoshitaka Mori
- Shigetaka Sasaki
- Saturu Tamoto

=== 1983 ===
- Yoshio Katsuta

=== 1982 ===
- Tom Kamino
- Eiki Kawano
- Kameo Kawaguchi
- Hiroshi Mitani
- Frank Moritsugu
- Genichi Nakahara
- Shigeo Nakamura
- Mitsuyuki Sakata
- Masatoshi Umetsu
- Perry Teale

=== 1980 ===
- Yutaka Okimura

== Kōdansha ==
The following is a list of Canada's kōdansha ('high dan holders').

=== Kudan (ninth dan) ===
- Raymond Damblant
- Yeiji Inouye
- Hiroshi Nakamura
- Mamoru Oye
- Yoshio Senda

=== Hachidan (eighth dan) ===
- Mark Berger
- William Doherty
- Vincent Grifo
- Frank Hatashita
- Mitchell Kawasaki
- Yuzuru Kojima
- Yves LeGal
- Yoshitaka Mori
- Tom Mukai
- Genichiro Nakahara
- Yutaka Okimura
- Yonekazu Sakai
- Shigetaka Sasaki
- Masao Takahashi
- Satoru Tamoto
- Goki Uemura
- Duncan Vignale
- Robert Arbour

== Olympic Games ==
The following judoka have represented Canada at the Olympic Games. There are two categories: athletes and coaches.

=== Paris 2024 ===
==== Athletes ====
- Catherine Beauchemin-Pinard
- Christa Deguchi
- Kelly Deguchi
- Shady Elnahas
- François Gauthier-Drapeau
- Arthur Margelidon
- Ana Laura Portuondo Isasi

==== Coaches ====
- Janusz Pawlowski
- Antoine Valois-Fortier

=== Tokyo 2020 ===
The 2020 Summer Olympics were postponed due to the COVID-19 pandemic and were held from 23 July to 8 August 2021.

==== Athletes ====
- Catherine Beauchemin-Pinard
- Shady Elnahas
- Ecaterina Guica
- Jessica Klimkait
- Arthur Margelidon
- Antoine Valois-Fortier

==== Coaches ====
- Sasha Mehmedovic
- Janusz Pawlowski

=== Rio de Janeiro 2016 ===
==== Athletes ====
- Antoine Bouchard
- Antoine Valois-Fortier
- Catherine Beauchemin-Pinard
- Ecaterina Guica
- Kelita Zupancic
- Kyle Reyes
- Sergio Pessoa

==== Coaches ====
- Nicolas Gill
- Michel Almeida
- Sasha Mehmedovic

=== London 2012 ===
==== Athletes ====
- Amy Cotton
- Alexandre Emond
- Sasha Mehmedovic
- Joliane Melançon
- Sergio Pessoa
- Nicholas Tritton
- Antoine Valois-Fortier
- Kelita Zupancic

==== Coaches ====
- Nicolas Gill
- Sergio Pessoa

=== Beijing 2008 ===
==== Athletes ====
- Marylise Lévesque
- Sasha Mehmedovic
- Keith Morgan
- Nicholas Tritton
- Frazer Will

==== Coaches ====
- Nicolas Gill
- Sergio Pessoa

=== Athens 2004 ===
==== Athletes ====
- Amy Cotton
- Marie-Hélène Chisholm
- Nicolas Gill
- Carolyne Lepage
- Keith Morgan
- Catherine Roberge

==== Coaches ====
- Hiroshi Nakamura
- Ewan Beaton

=== Sydney 2000 ===
==== Athletes ====
- Luce Baillargeon
- Michelle Buckingham
- Nicolas Gill
- Keith Morgan
- Kimberly Ribble
- Sophie Roberge

==== Coaches ====
- Hiroshi Nakamura

=== Atlanta 1996 ===
==== Athletes ====
- Ewan Beaton
- Michelle Buckingham
- Nancy Filteau
- Nicolas Gill
- Nathalie Gosselin
- Niki Jenkins
- Carolyne Lepage
- Colin Morgan
- Keith Morgan
- Marie-Josée Morneau
- Taro Tan

==== Coaches ====
- Hiroshi Nakamura
- Andrzej Sądej

=== Barcelona 1992 ===
==== Athletes ====
- Ewan Beaton
- Michelle Buckingham
- Jean-Pierre Cantin
- Nicolas Gill
- Sandra Greaves
- Roman Hatashita
- Brigitte Lastrade
- Pascale Mainville
- Jane Patterson
- Lyne Poirier
- Patrick Roberge
- Alison Webb

==== Coaches ====
- Lionel Langlais
- Andrzej Sądej

=== Seoul 1988 ===
==== Athletes ====
- Glenn Beauchamp
- Kevin Doherty
- Louis Jani
- Joseph Meli
- Phil Takahashi
- Craig Weldon

==== Coaches ====
- Hiroshi Nakamura
- Tina Takahashi

=== Los Angeles 1984 ===
==== Athletes ====
- Glenn Beauchamp
- Mark Berger
- Fred Blaney
- Kevin Doherty
- Brad Farrow
- Louis Jani
- Joseph Meli
- Phil Takahashi

==== Coaches ====
- Jim Kojima

=== Moscow 1980 ===
A team was selected, but Canada boycotted the 1980 Olympic Games in protest of the Soviet Union's invasion of Afghanistan.

==== Athletes ====
- Alain Cyr
- Brad Farrow
- Tom Greenway
- Gary Hirose
- Tim Hirose
- Louis Jani
- Phil Takahashi

==== Coaches ====
- Yoshio Senda

=== Montreal 1976 ===
==== Athletes ====
- Wayne Erdman
- Brad Farrow
- Rainer Fischer
- Tom Greenway
- Joseph Meli

==== Coaches ====
- Hiroshi Nakamura

=== Munich 1972 ===
==== Athletes ====
- Terry Farnsworth
- Philip Illingworth
- William McGregor
- Doug Rogers
- Alan Sakai

==== Coaches ====
- Leo Haunsberger

=== Tokyo 1964 ===
==== Athletes ====
- Doug Rogers

== Paralympic Games ==
The following judoka have represented Canada at the Paralympic Games. There are two categories: athletes and coaches.

=== Tokyo 2020 ===
The 2020 Summer Paralympics were postponed due to the COVID-19 pandemic and were held from 24 August to 5 September 2021.

==== Athletes ====
- Priscilla Gagné

==== Coaches ====
- Andrzej Sądej

=== Rio de Janeiro 2016 ===
==== Athletes ====
- Priscilla Gagné
- Tony Walby

=== London 2012 ===
==== Athletes ====
- Justin Karn
- Tim Rees
- Tony Walby

==== Coaches ====
- Tom Thompson

=== Beijing 2008 ===
==== Athletes ====
- William Morgan

==== Coaches ====
- Tom Thompson

=== Athens 2004 ===
==== Athletes ====
- William Morgan

==== Coaches ====
- Tom Thompson

=== Sydney 2000 ===
==== Athletes ====
- William Morgan
- Pier Morten

==== Coaches ====
- Tom Thompson

=== Atlanta 1996 ===
==== Athletes ====
- Pier Morten

=== Barcelona 1992 ===
==== Athletes ====
- Pier Morten

=== Seoul 1988 ===
==== Athletes ====
- Eddie Morten
- Pier Morten

== World Judo Championships ==
The following judoka have represented Canada at the World Judo Championships. There are two categories: athletes and coaches.

=== Abu Dhabi 2024 ===
==== Athletes ====
- Catherine Beauchemin-Pinard
- Christa Deguchi
- Kelly Deguchi
- Shady Elnahas
- Julien Frascadore
- François Gauthier-Drapeau
- Jessica Klimkait
- Louis Krieber-Gagnon
- Arthur Margelidon
- Ana Laura Portuondo Isasi
- Kyle Reyes

=== Doha 2023 ===
==== Athletes ====
- Catherine Beauchemin-Pinard
- Christa Deguchi
- Kelly Deguchi
- Shady Elnahas
- François Gauthier-Drapeau
- Jessica Klimkait
- Louis Krieber-Gagnon
- Arthur Margelidon
- Kyle Reyes

=== Tashkent 2022 ===
==== Athletes ====
- Catherine Beauchemin-Pinard
- Marc Deschenes
- Christa Deguchi
- Kelly Deguchi
- Shady Elnahas
- François Gauthier-Drapeau
- Jessica Klimkait
- Arthur Margelidon
- Kyle Reyes

=== Budapest 2021 ===
==== Athletes ====
- Étienne Briand
- Christa Deguchi
- Marc Deschenes
- Shady Elnahas
- Mohab Elnahas
- Jessica Klimkait
- Ecaterina Guica
- Kyle Reyes

=== Tokyo 2019 ===
==== Athletes ====
- Catherine Beauchemin-Pinard
- Étienne Briand
- Zachary Burt
- Shady Elnahas
- Christa Deguchi
- Constantin Gabun
- Ecaterina Gucia
- Jessica Klimkait
- Arthur Margelidon
- Kyle Reyes
- Jacob Valois
- Antoine Valois-Fortier

=== Baku 2018 ===
==== Athletes ====
- Catherine Beauchemin-Pinard
- Antoine Bouchard
- Étienne Briand
- Emily Burt
- Zachary Burt
- Christa Deguchi
- Ecaterina Gucia
- Jessica Klimkait
- Louis Krieber-Gagon
- Arthur Margelidon
- Kyle Reyes
- Stéphanie Tremblay
- Kelita Zupancic

=== Budapest 2017 ===
==== Athletes ====
- Catherine Beauchemin-Pinard
- Antoine Bouchard
- Étienne Briand
- Zachary Burt
- Ecaterina Gucia
- Ana Laura Portundo Isasi
- Jessica Klimkait
- Louis Krieber-Gagon
- Bradley Langois
- Arthur Margelidon
- Kyle Reyes
- Stéphanie Tremblay
- Antoine Valois-Fortier
- Kelita Zupancic

=== Astana 2015 ===
==== Athletes ====
- Catherine Beauchemin-Pinard
- Antoine Bouchard
- Étienne Briand
- Patrick Gagné
- Ecaterina Gucia
- Arthur Margelidon
- Sérgio Pessoa Jr
- Alix Renaud-Roy
- Kyle Reyes
- Stéphanie Tremblay
- Antoine Valois-Fortier
- Kelita Zupancic

=== Chelyabinsk 2014 ===
==== Athletes ====
- Catherine Beauchemin-Pinard
- Antoine Bouchard
- Étienne Briand
- Monica Burgess
- Patrick Gagné
- Alexis Morin-Martel
- Kyle Reyes
- Catherine Roberge
- Stéphanie Tremblay
- Antoine Valois-Fortier
- Kelita Zupancic

=== Rio de Janeiro 2013 ===
==== Athletes ====
- Catherine Beauchemin-Pinard
- Étienne Briand
- Amy Cotton
- Alexandre Emond
- Patrick Gagné
- Sasha Mehmedovic
- Joliane Melançon
- Alexis Morin-Martel
- Sérgio Pessoa Jr
- Catherine Roberge
- Stéphanie Tremblay
- Antoine Valois-Fortier
- Kelita Zupancic

=== Paris 2011 ===
==== Athletes ====
- Amy Cotton
- Alexandre Emond
- Sasha Mehmedovic
- Joliane Melançon
- Guillaume Perrault
- Michal Popiel
- Catherine Roberge
- Nicholas Tritton
- Antoine Valois-Fortier
- Frazer Will
- Kelita Zupancic

=== Tokyo 2010 ===
==== Athletes ====
- Amy Cotton
- Alexandre Emond
- Kalem Kachur
- Isabel Latulippe
- Sasha Mehmedovic
- Joliane Melançon
- Guillaume Perrault
- Sérgio Pessoa Jr
- Michal Popiel
- Catherine Roberge
- Nicholas Tritton
- Frazer Will
- Kelita Zupancic

=== Rotterdam 2009 ===
==== Athletes ====
- Amy Cotton
- Scott Edward
- Alexandre Emond
- Kalem Kachur
- Joliane Melançon
- Sérgio Pessoa Jr
- Michal Popiel
- Nicholas Tritton

=== Rio de Janeiro 2007 ===
==== Athletes ====
- Olia Berger
- Marie-Hélène Chisholm
- Isabel Latulippe
- Marylise Levesque
- Sasha Mehmedovic
- Keith Morgan
- Catherine Roberge
- Aminata Sall
- Nicholas Tritton
- Frazer Will

=== Cairo 2005 ===
==== Athletes ====
- Olia Berger
- Michelle Buckingham
- Marie-Hélène Chisholm
- Alexandru Ciupe
- Amy Cotton
- Isabel Latulippe
- Sasha Mehmedovic
- Catherine Roberge
- Aminata Sall
- Nicholas Tritton
- Frazer Will

=== Osaka 2003 ===
==== Athletes ====
- Michelle Buckingham
- Marie-Hélène Chisholm
- Amy Cotton
- Nicolas Gill
- Carolyne Lepage
- Jean-François Marceau
- Keith Morgan
- Aminata Sall
- Daniel-Guillaume Simard

=== Munich 2001 ===
==== Athletes ====
- Michelle Buckingham
- Marie-Hélène Chisholm
- Alexandru Ciupe
- Stéphane Chrétien
- Nicolas Gill
- Jacynthe Maloney
- Jean-François Marceau
- Keith Morgan
- Sophie Roberge
- Aminata Sall

=== Birmingham 1999 ===
==== Athletes ====
- Luce Baillargeon
- Nicolas Gill
- Niki Jenkins
- Brigette Lastrade
- Carolyne Lepage
- Keith Morgan
- Sophie Roberge

=== Paris 1997 ===
==== Athletes ====
- Luce Baillargeon
- Michelle Buckingham
- Brigette Lastrade
- Carolyne Lepage
- Keith Morgan

=== Chiba 1995 ===
==== Athletes ====
- Ewan Beaton
- Michelle Buckingham
- Nicolas Gill
- Nathalie Gosselin
- Renee Hock
- Niki Jenkins
- Nancy Filteau
- James Kendrick
- Carolyne Lepage
- David Miller
- Keith Morgan
- Maxime Roberge
- Sophie Roberge
- Taro Tan

=== Hamilton 1993 ===
==== Athletes ====
- Ewan Beaton
- Michelle Buckingham
- Jean-Pierre Cantin
- Nicolas Gill
- Renee Hock
- Louis Jani
- Niki Jenkins
- Jan Karnik
- Brigette Lastrade
- Colin Morgan
- Jane Patterson
- Dominique Pilon
- Sophie Roberge
- Taro Tan

=== Barcelona 1991 ===
==== Athletes ====
- Ewan Beaton
- Jean-Pierre Cantin
- Andrée Dupont
- Nicolas Gill
- Roman Hatashita
- Louis Jani
- Kimberly Bergey Kaip
- Brigette Lastrade
- Pascale Mainville
- Jane Patterson
- Lyne Porier
- Allison Webb

=== Belgrade 1989 ===
==== Athletes ====
- Ronald Angus
- Jean-Pierre Cantin
- Mandy Clayton
- Roger Côté
- Nathalie Gosselin
- Sandra Greaves
- Roman Hatashita
- James Kendrick
- Charlotte Streicek
- Aartje Vroegh
- Allison Webb
- Kevin West

=== Essen 1987 ===
==== Athletes ====
- Fred Blaney
- Jean-Pierre Cantin
- Mandy Clayton
- Kevin Doherty
- Sandra Greaves
- Kathy Hubble
- Hartley Jones
- Joe Meli
- Jane Patterson
- Lyne Porier
- Karen Sheffield
- Steven Sheffield
- Allison Webb

=== Maastricht 1986 ===
==== Athletes ====
- Mandy Clayton
- Sandra Greaves
- Kathy Hubble
- Lyne Porier
- Karen Sheffield
- Allison Webb

=== Seoul 1985 ===
==== Athletes ====
- Glenn Beauchamp
- Mark Berger
- Fred Blaney
- Kevin Doherty
- Brad Farrow
- Louis Jani
- Joe Meli
- Phil Takahashi

=== Vienna 1984 ===
==== Athletes ====
- Nancy Filteau
- Lorraine Méthot
- Karen Sheffield
- Tina Takahashi
- Susan Ulrich
- Aartje Vroegh

=== Moscow 1983 ===
==== Athletes ====
- Mark Berger
- Fred Blaney
- Alain Cyr
- Kevin Doherty
- Brad Farrow
- Tim Hirose
- Louis Jani
- Phil Takahashi

=== Paris 1982 ===
==== Athletes ====
- Diane Amyot
- Mandy Clayton
- Nancy Filteau
- Lorraine Méthot
- Karen Sheffield
- Tina Takahashi

=== Maastricht 1981 ===
==== Athletes ====
- Mark Berger
- Brad Farrow
- Alain Cyr
- Kevin Doherty
- Gary Hirose
- Joe Meli
- Phil Takahashi

=== New York 1980 ===
==== Athletes ====
- Andrée Barrette
- Sara Hockett
- Lorraine Méthot
- Karen Millar
- Karen Sheffield
- Tina Takahashi
- Susan Ulrich

=== Paris 1979 ===
==== Athletes ====
- Alain Cyr
- Brad Farrow
- Tom Greenway
- Gary Hirose
- Tim Hirose
- Louis Jani
- Phil Takahashi

=== Vienna 1975 ===
==== Athletes ====
- Wayne Erdman
- Brad Farrow
- Rainer Fisher
- Daniel Hardy
- Gary Hirose
- Chris Preobrazenski

=== Lausanne 1973 ===
==== Athletes ====
- Wayne Erdman
- Terry Farnworth
- Mitchell Kawasaki
- Paul Kereliuk
- Roger Perron
- Alan Sakai
- Goki Uemura
- Udo Werner

=== Ludwigshafen 1971 ===
==== Athletes ====
- Nick Bleyendaal
- Gordon Buttle
- Wayne Erdman
- Terry Farnworth
- Mitchell Kawasaki
- Charles Maingon
- Henry Mukai
- John O'Neil
- Ron Powell

=== Mexico City 1969 ===
==== Athletes ====
- Nick Bleyendaal
- Gilles Champagne
- Albert Dore
- Vincent Grifo
- Marcel Gueymard
- Gary Hirose
- Algis Liauba
- Charles Maingon
- Henry Mukai
- Rick Yodogawa

=== Salt Lake City 1967 ===
==== Athletes ====
- Pat Bolger
- Gordon Buttle
- Mike Johnson
- Doug Rogers
- Tom Tamura

=== Rio de Janeiro 1965 ===
==== Athletes ====
- Doug Rogers

=== Paris 1961 ===
==== Athletes ====
- Manfred Matt

=== Tokyo 1958 ===
==== Athletes ====
- Masatoshi Umetsu

=== Tokyo 1956 ===
==== Athletes ====
- Bernard Gauthier

== See also ==
- Judo in Canada
