= Judo Canada =

Sports governing body

- Sport: Judo
- Category: Martial art; Combat sport
- Jurisdiction: Canada
- Founded: 1956
- Affiliation: IJF
- Affiliation date: 1958
- Regional affiliation: PJC
- Affiliation date: 2009
- Headquarters: Montreal, Quebec
- President: Donna Hanson
- Sponsor: Sport Canada

Official website
- www.judocanada.org

Judo Canada, formerly known as the Canadian Kodokan Black Belt Association, is the non-profit national governing body of the Japanese martial art and combat sport Judo in Canada, and a federation of Judo associations in each of the ten provinces and three territories. It was incorporated in 1956 and recognized by the International Judo Federation in 1958.

== See also ==
- Judo in Canada
- List of Canadian judoka
- List of judo organizations
- Judo by country
