= Judo in Ontario =

- Country: Canada
- Governing body: Judo Ontario; Judo Canada
- National team: Canadian Olympic team

The Japanese martial art and combat sport judo has been practised in the Canadian province of Ontario since 1942.

== History ==
Judo was introduced to Canada in the early twentieth century by Japanese migrants, and was limited to British Columbia until the forced expulsion, internment, and resettlement of Japanese-Canadians after Japan entered the Second World War in 1941. Japanese Canadian expulsion and internment was pivotal in the development of Canadian judo because it forced judoka to settle in other parts of the country. Some returned to the Pacific coast after 1949, but most found new homes in other provinces. New dojos opened in the Prairies, Ontario, and Quebec, primarily in the mid-to-late 1940s, and the centre of Canadian judo shifted from Vancouver to Toronto, where a significant number of judoka had settled after the war. Many early dojos were housed at the local branch of the YMCA, which also provided short-term accommodation, assisted with finding employment, and coordinated social programs for resettled Japanese Canadians. Clubs at military bases, RCMP barracks, and universities were also common.

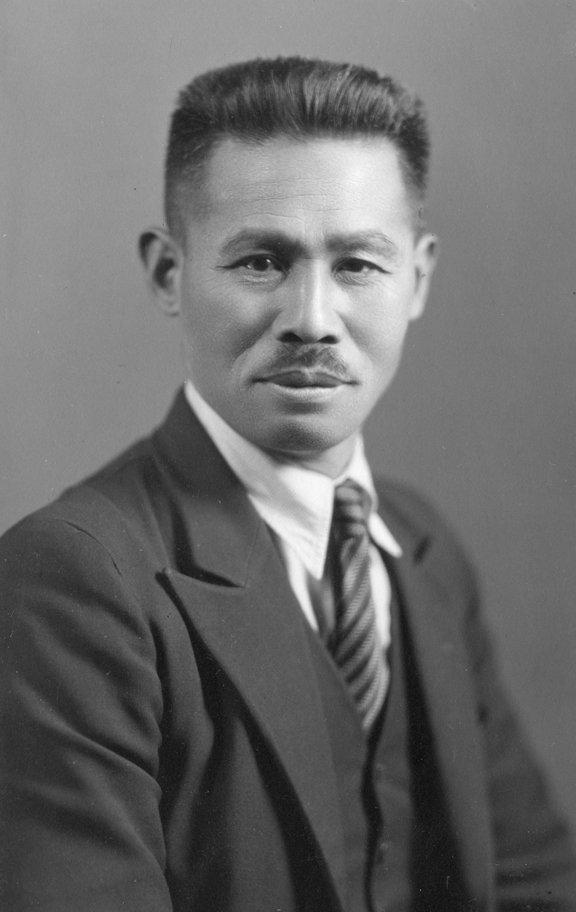
Photo of Atsumu Kamino taken sometime before 1942

The first judo club in Ontario was established at Prisoner of War Camp 101 in Angler, near Neys Provincial Park, following Japanese internment in 1942. Masato Ishibashi was the instructor, and the club trained daily. According to Robert Okazaki's diary from his time in the POW camp, "Despite food rationing, Mr. Masato Ishibashi and his judo students are excelling at their sport. Their training is awfully tough and their Kakegoe (sounds of hard practice) reverberates through the camp".

After the war, multiple dojos opened in Toronto from 1946–7: Frank Mukai's club at the West End YMCA at 931 College Street, Atsumu Kamino's at the Church of All Nations at 423 Queen Street West, and Minoru "Frank" Hatashita's in a friend's garage. All three men were interned at Tashme, but left for Ontario by 1944 through a provision of the War Measures Act that allowed Japanese Canadians to move elsewhere in Canada if they could find employment. Kamino had started the Kitsilano branch of Kidokan (Tai Iku Dojo until it was renamed by Jigoro Kano in 1932), and his Toronto dojo was called the Kidokwan Judo Institute after its Vancouver predecessor. The Hatashita Judo Club had several locations after it was established, including the basement of a restaurant on Carleton Street and a storefront at 131 Queen Street East.

Dojos were also established outside of Toronto, such as Masatoshi Umetsu's Seikeikan Judo Club in Burlington, founded in 1946, and often in small towns such as Dryden, where Hiroshi "Rush" Mitani opened a club in 1952. Masao Takahashi organised a judo club at RCAF Station Rockcliffe in 1950, and did the same at several other RCAF bases when he was restationed.

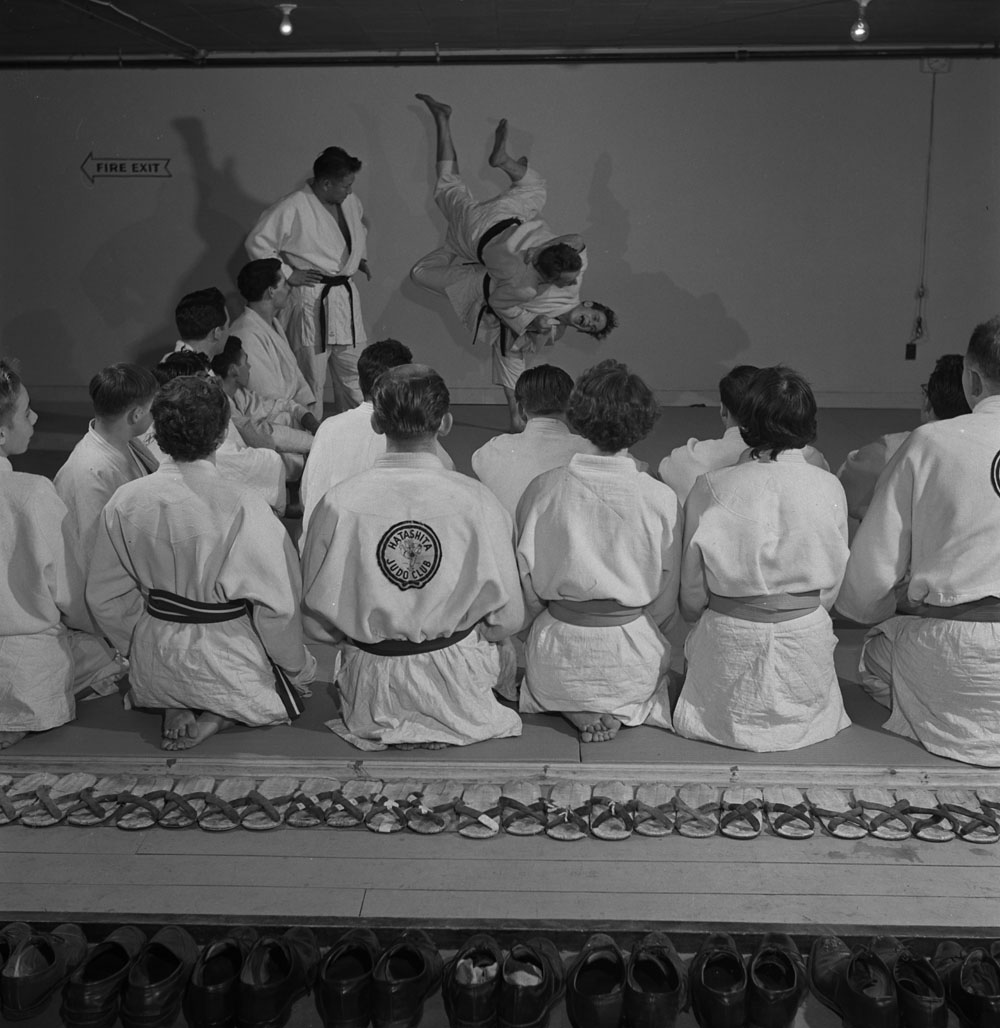
Frank Hatashita instructing a judo class in Toronto (1955)

The number of judo clubs increased significantly during the 1950s and 60s, in large part due to the efforts of Frank Hatashita, who played a role similar to Shigetaka Sasaki in British Columbia during the pre-war period. Hatashita, who first learned judo in British Columbia and later trained with Sasaki and Kamino at Tashme internment camp, moved to Toronto and turned judo into his full-time business after the war, making him the first professional judoka in Canada. Nicknamed "Canada's Mr. Judo", he promoted judo outside of the Japanese Canadian community by putting on public demonstrations and clinics, writing articles for newspapers, publishing the monthly Judo News Bulletin (which was renamed Canadian Judo News, then Judo World), and even appeared in a 1955 episode of the CBC television show Tabloid meant to introduce Japanese culture to Canadians. Hatashita also played a major organizational role, sponsoring close to 100 judo clubs across Ontario, and serving as President of the CKBBA and Pan American Judo Union and Vice President of the International Judo Federation.

== See also ==
- Judo in Canada
- List of Canadian judoka
