= Sasha Mehmedovic =

Canadian judoka

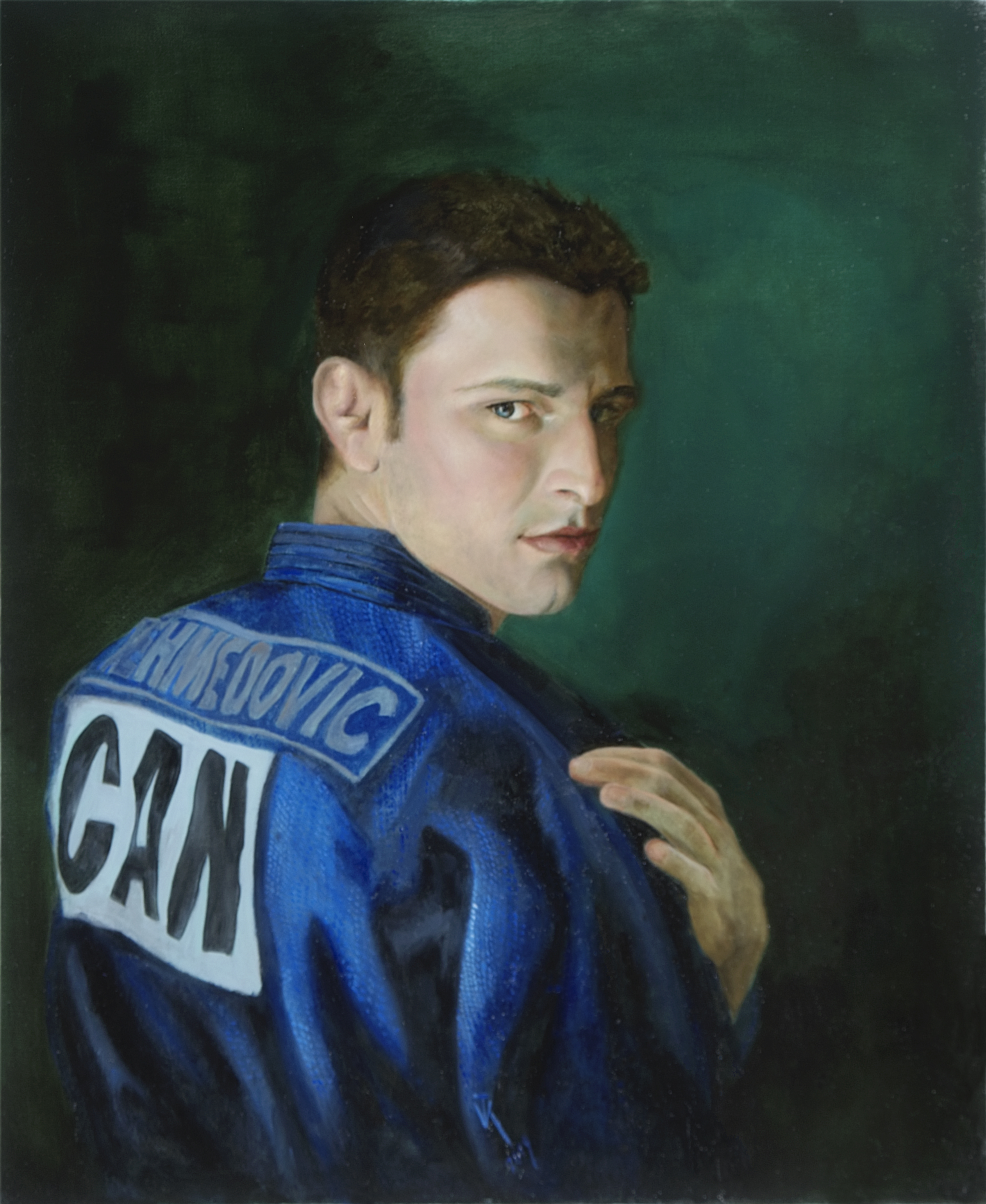
- A portrait of Mehmedovic by Veronica Kvassetskaia-Tsyglan

Personal information
- Born: 18 March 1985 (age 41) Pančevo, SR Serbia, SFR Yugoslavia
- Home town: Montreal, Quebec
- Occupation: Judoka
- Height: 1.73 m (5 ft 8 in)
- Weight: 70 kg (154 lb) (2012)

Sport
- Country: Canada
- Sport: Judo
- Weight class: –66 kg
- Rank: 3rd dan black belt
- Club: Shidokan
- Coached by: Nicolas Gill

Achievements and titles
- Olympic Games: 9th (2008)
- World Champ.: 7th (2007)
- Pan American Champ.: (2012)
Medal record
Men's judo
Representing Canada
Pan American Championships
| Silver medal – second place | 2012 Montreal | –66 kg |
| Bronze medal – third place | 2006 Buenos Aires | –66 kg |
| Bronze medal – third place | 2007 Montreal | –66 kg |
| Bronze medal – third place | 2008 Miami | –66 kg |
IJF Grand Prix
| Bronze medal – third place | 2009 Qingdao | –66 kg |
Pan American Cadet Championships
| Gold medal – first place | 2001 Acapulco | –66 kg |

Profile at external databases
- IJF: 1754
- JudoInside.com: 15642
- Updated on 2 January 2023

Sasha Mehmedovic is a Canadian judoka. At the 2012 Summer Olympics he competed in the Men's 66 kg, but was defeated in the second round.

== Portrait ==
In 2010 the Portrait Society of Canada held a month-long exhibition at the John B. Aird Gallery in Toronto, titled "Canadian Olympic Athletes: a Dialogue in Art", that featured portraits of Canadian Olympic athletes painted by members of the society. One of the portraits, painted with oil by society founder and president Veronica Kvassetskaia-Tsyglan, is of Mehmedovic.

== See also ==
- Judo in Ontario
- Judo in Quebec
- Judo in Canada
- List of Canadian judoka
