= Judo in Canada =

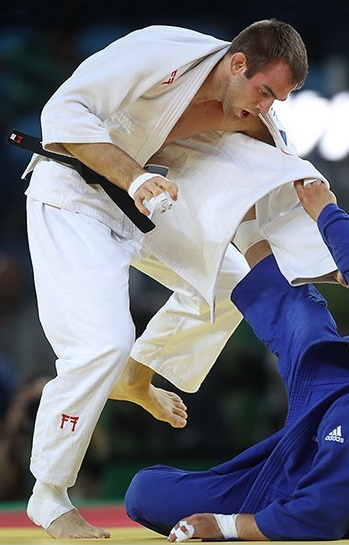
- Antoine Valois-Fortier, one of Canada's most successful Judoka, at the 2016 Olympics
- Country: Canada
- Governing body: Judo Canada
- National teams: Canadian Olympic team; Canadian Paralympic team

International competitions
- Summer Olympics; World Judo Championships; Summer Paralympics; IBSA Judo World Championships

The Japanese martial art and combat sport judo has been practised in Canada for over a century. The first long-term judo dojo in Canada, Tai Iku Dojo, was established by a Japanese immigrant named Shigetaka "Steve" Sasaki in Vancouver in 1924. Sasaki and his students opened several branch schools in British Columbia and even trained RCMP officers until 1942, when Japanese Canadians were expelled from the Pacific coast and either interned or forced to move elsewhere in Canada due to fears that they were a threat to the country after Japan entered the Second World War. When the war was over, the government gave interned Japanese Canadians two options: resettle in Canada outside of the 'Japanese exclusion zone' (within 100 miles of the Pacific coast) or emigrate to Japan.

The majority moved to other provinces, and Japanese Canadian resettlement is the main way that judo was introduced to the Prairies, Ontario, and Quebec. The pattern is different in Atlantic Canada and Northern Canada, where judo was typically introduced 5–10 years later and migrants from Europe played a more significant role. The Canadian Kodokan Black Belt Association, now known as Judo Canada, was established in Toronto in 1956 and recognized by the International Judo Federation as Canada's official governing body in 1958, and by 1960 there were more than 4,000 judoka in Canada, most of whom were not Japanese Canadian. Interest in judo also grew among the general public after Doug Rogers unexpectedly won silver at the 1964 Tokyo Olympics, and former Prime Minister Pierre Trudeau's practice of judo became a prominent part of his public persona in the late 1960s. Today there are about 400 judo clubs and approximately 25,000 judoka in Canada, and it is most popular in Quebec where there are around 120 clubs and 10,000 judoka.

While most Canadian judo clubs focus on physical education and recreation, Canada has fielded competitors in international competition since the 1950s, and its athletes have won eight medals at the Summer Olympics and twenty at the World Judo Championships. Canada's most successful competitor is Nicolas Gill, who won medals at two Olympic Games and three World Championships, and is now the CEO of Judo Canada after coaching the national team from 2009 to 2016. Antoine Valois-Fortier's bronze at the 2012 London Olympics—Canada's first Olympic medal since Gill's silver in 2000—led to increased federal funding that significantly improved Judo Canada's training capacity, including a new training centre in Montreal where the organization is now based. Since then Christa Deguchi and Jessica Klimkait have won the World Judo Championships, Klimkait and Catherine Beauchemin-Pinard became the first Canadian women in history to win Olympic medals in judo at the 2020 Olympics, Priscilla Gagné became both the first Canadian woman in history to win a medal and the first Canadian to win silver in Paralympic judo at the 2020 Paralympics, and Christa Deguchi became the first Canadian to win an Olympic gold medal at the 2024 Olympics.

== History ==
Judo is a Japanese martial art and combat sport founded by Jigoro Kano (1860 – 1938) in 1882. It was introduced to Canada by Japanese migrants in the early twentieth century, first in British Columbia and then in the Prairies, Ontario, and Quebec as Japanese Canadians who had been expelled from the Pacific coast during the Second World War resettled in other provinces. The pattern is different in Atlantic Canada and Northern Canada, where judo was typically introduced 5–10 years later and migrants from Europe played a more significant role.

=== Beginnings in British Columbia ===
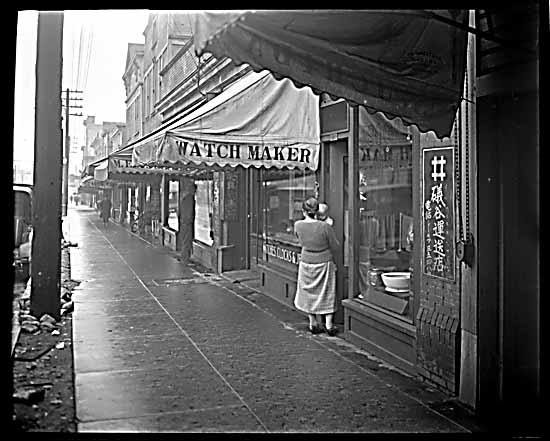
View of Powell Street in Vancouver's Japantown (1928)

Before World War II (1939 – 1945) most people from Japan or of Japanese ancestry in Canada (23,149 according to the 1941 census) lived in British Columbia. About a quarter of that population lived in Vancouver, and the majority of the Vancouver residents lived in the neighbourhood known as 'Japantown' or 'Little Tokyo', which was made up of about six blocks centred on Powell Street and bordered by Alexander, Jackson, Cordova, and Main. It was a distinct Japanese area with its own stores, banks, and theatres until all people of Japanese ancestry living within 100 miles (161 km) of the Pacific coast were expelled, their property was confiscated, and the majority were interned in 1942 (see 'World War II and Japanese internment' below). The area is now part of the Downtown Eastside.

There were several public 'jujutsu' exhibitions and matches in Vancouver beginning in 1906, which may have included or actually been judo since it was often referred to as 'Kano jujutsu' at the time. Judo may also have been practised privately in Vancouver as early as 1910, and Sataro Fujita reportedly taught judo in the city around 1914. Shinzo Takagaki, a Kodokan yondan (fourth dan) who promoted judo in many countries, reportedly moved to the United States with the intent of becoming a professional wrestler. He was admitted to Canada to study at the University of British Columbia in 1924, but never attended classes and instead competed in wrestling matches, taught judo, and also issued the first shodan (first dan) certificate in Canada to Kametaro Akiyama in 1925. Fujita and Takagaki did not settle in Canada, however, and neither established a long-term school.

==== Tai Iku Dojo ====
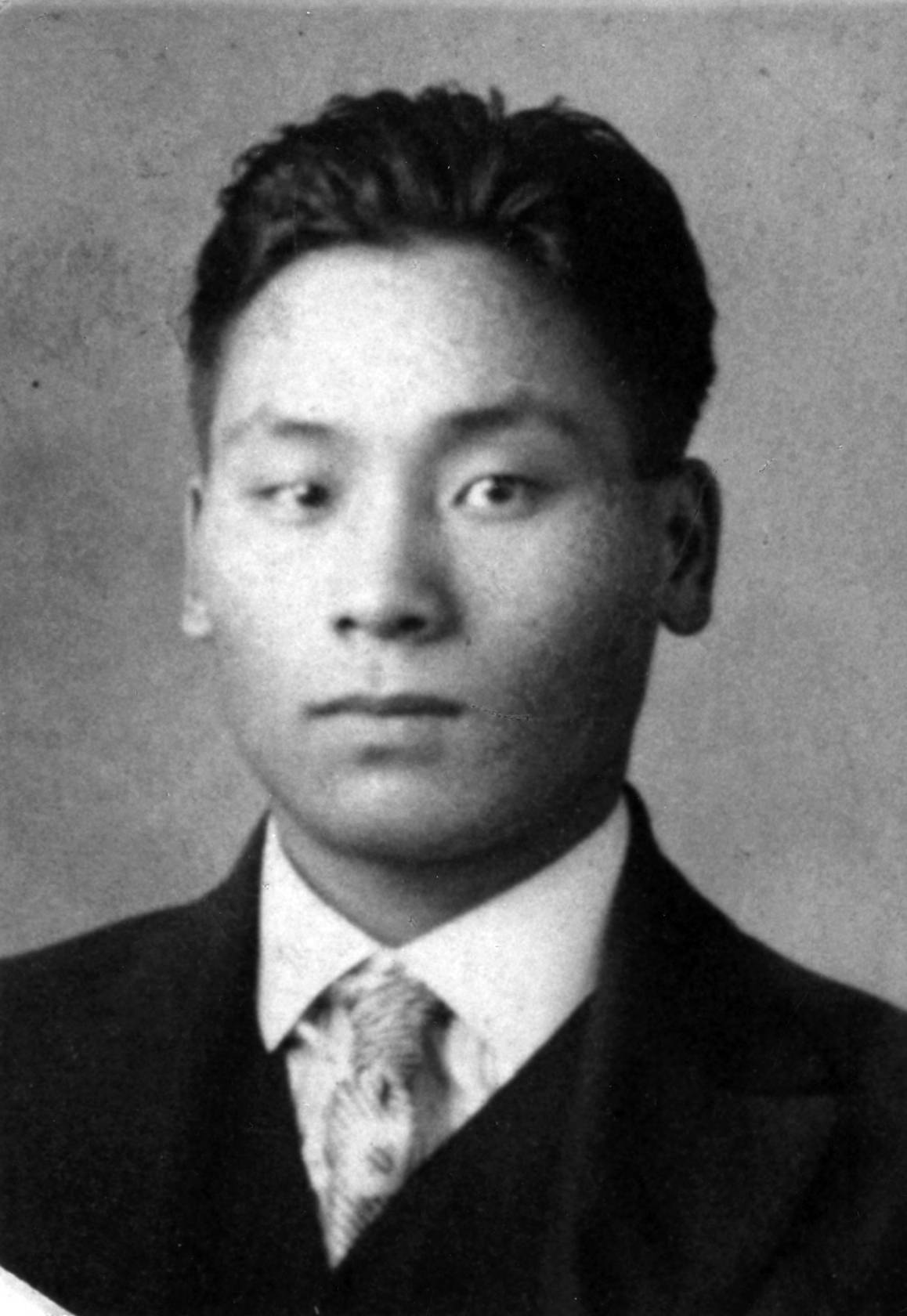
Photo of Shigetaka Sasaki, the 'Father of judo in Canada' taken around 1930

Shigetaka "Steve" Sasaki emigrated from Japan to Vancouver in 1922 at the age of 19 and worked as a shop assistant to study business. In 1923 he began attending local judo-versus-wrestling matches and was extremely disappointed to discover that they were fixed and badly misrepresented judo (it is unclear whether Takagaki was involved in any of the matches in question). Sasaki was nidan (second dan) and had been a judo instructor at Yonago High School in Japan, so he held a meeting with Vancouver's Japanese community to gauge their interest in establishing a non-profit dojo that adhered to judo's two fundamental principles: seiryoku zen'yō (精力善用, 'maximum efficiency, minimum effort' in Japanese) and jita kyōei (自他共栄, 'mutual welfare and benefit'). After a year of planning, meetings, and fundraising, Sasaki opened Tai Iku Dojo (体育道場, 'physical education training hall') in 1924.

It was difficult to secure an appropriate location and the first practices were held in the living room of Kanzo Ui, one of the dojo's sponsors, at 500 Alexander Street in Vancouver. A few months later it was relocated to a larger location in the 500 block of Powell Street (the dojo appears to have had more than one address on Powell Street over the years, and was recorded as 403 Powell in 1932). Over the next several years new branches of Tai Iku Dojo were established in Steveston (where Tomoaki Doi and Takeshi Yamamoto had already started a club but asked for Sasaki's help), Kitsilano, Fairview, Haney, Mission, Woodfibre, Chemainus, Victoria, Duncan, Whonnock, Hammond, and Vernon. Sasaki or his assistants helped with the instruction at all of the clubs.

==== RCMP training ====
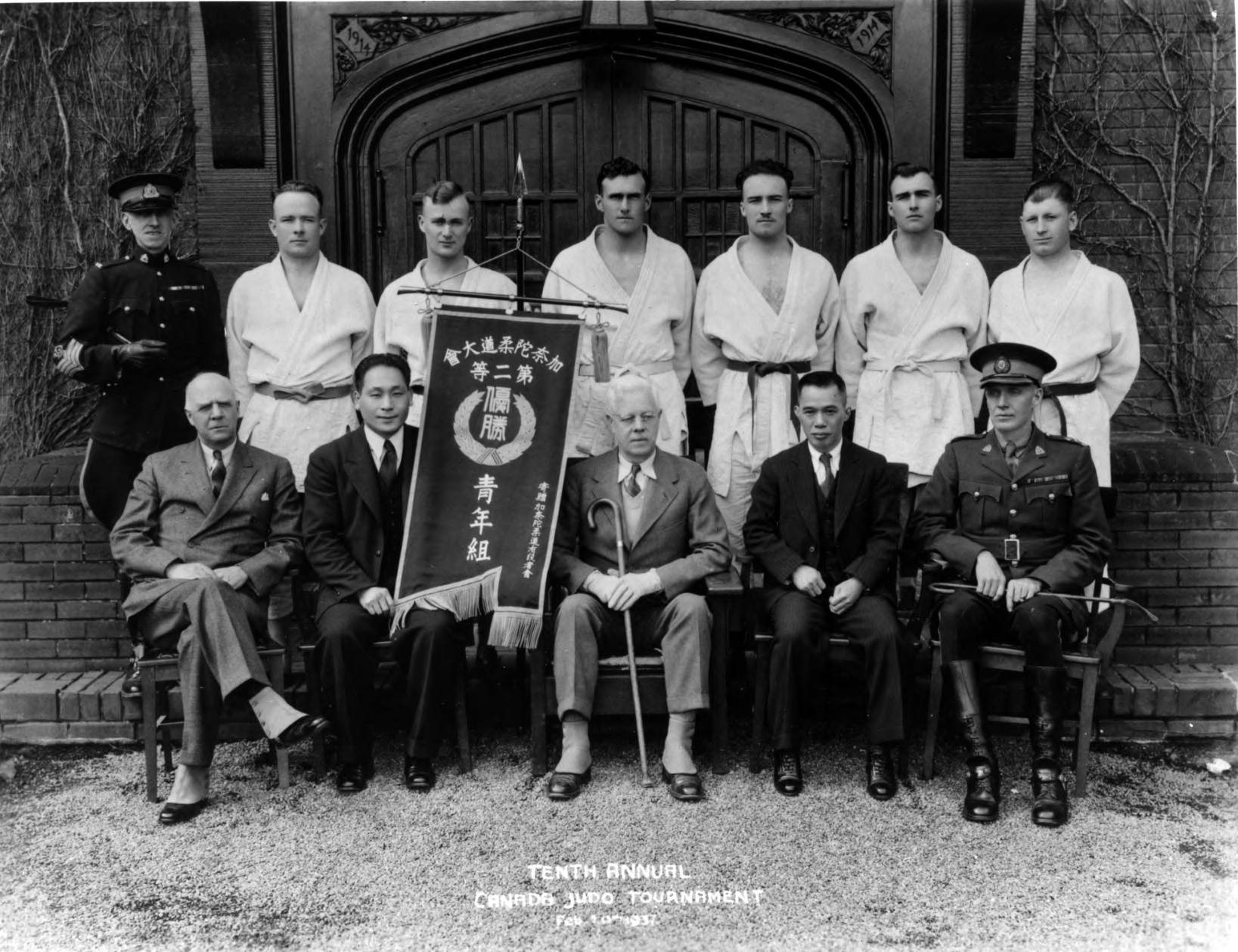
RCMP participants and officials at the 10th Annual Canadian Judo Championships in Vancouver in 1937. Front row, left to right: Superintendent Fowell, Shigetaka Sasaki, Assistant Commissioner Cadiz, Etsuji Morii, and Inspector Genan

For nearly a decade all of the judoka at Tai Iku Dojo's various branches were ethnically Japanese. In 1932, however, the commissioner of the Vancouver Royal Canadian Mounted Police (RCMP) detachment attended a judo tournament and was so impressed that he replaced his officer's boxing and wrestling training with judo. Sasaki saw this as an important opportunity to promote judo throughout Canada and taught the initial cohort of eleven RCMP officers personally at the detachment gymnasium at 33rd Avenue & Heather Street, on the site now known as the Heather Street Lands. This helped generate more interest in judo, and people from outside the Japanese-Canadian community began participating in tournaments in 1933. In 1936 all eleven officers in the first cohort were promoted to shodan, and in 1937 a six-man team of RCMP judoka placed second in a tournament. RCMP judo training ceased in 1941 after Japan entered the Second World War (see 'World War II and Japanese internment' below).

==== Jigoro Kano's visits to Canada ====
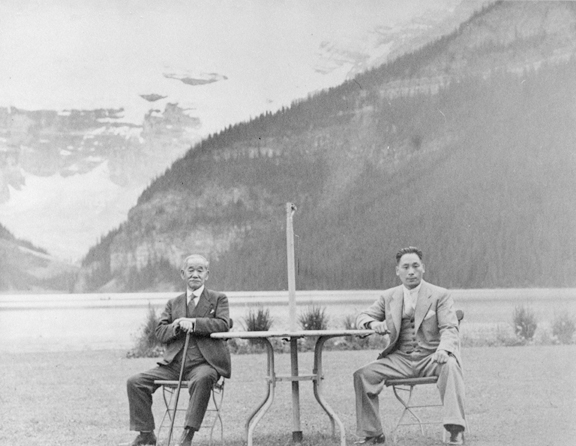
Jigoro Kano and Shigetaka Sasaki at Lake Louise, Alberta on their way to the Berlin Olympics in 1936

Jigoro Kano, the founder of judo who was also an accomplished professional educator and a member of Japan's House of Peers, visited Canada three times. During the first visit in 1932, when Kano was on his way back to Japan from the 1932 Summer Olympics in Los Angeles, he honoured Tai Iku Dojo by renaming it Kidokan (気道館, 'place of intrinsic energy' in Japanese), and all other dojos in British Columbia became branches of Kidokan. The second visit was in 1936, during which he asked Sasaki to accompany him to Berlin to make a presentation to the International Olympic Committee (IOC) and participate in a subsequent judo demonstration tour in Germany, France, England, the United States, and Canada (Sasaki had to return to Vancouver after a month in Berlin to attend to his business and judo obligations). Kano's last visit to Canada was in 1938, on his way home from meetings with the IOC in Cairo. He died of pneumonia later that year on the Hikawa Maru, mid-voyage from Vancouver to Yokohama.

=== World War II and Japanese internment ===
Japan's attack on Pearl Harbor on 7 December 1941 began the war between the Japanese Empire and the Allies, including Canada. This sparked fears of a Japanese invasion on the Pacific coast in a context of already long-standing anti-Asian racism (Japantown was targeted during the 1907 anti-Asian riots in Vancouver, and most Japanese Canadians did not have the right to vote until 1949, for example). On 25 February 1942 the federal government invoked the War Measures Act to order the removal of all Japanese Canadians residing within 100 miles (160 km) of the Pacific coast, even though about 77% of them were British subjects (Canadian citizenship was not instituted until 1946) and 61% were Canada-born nisei.

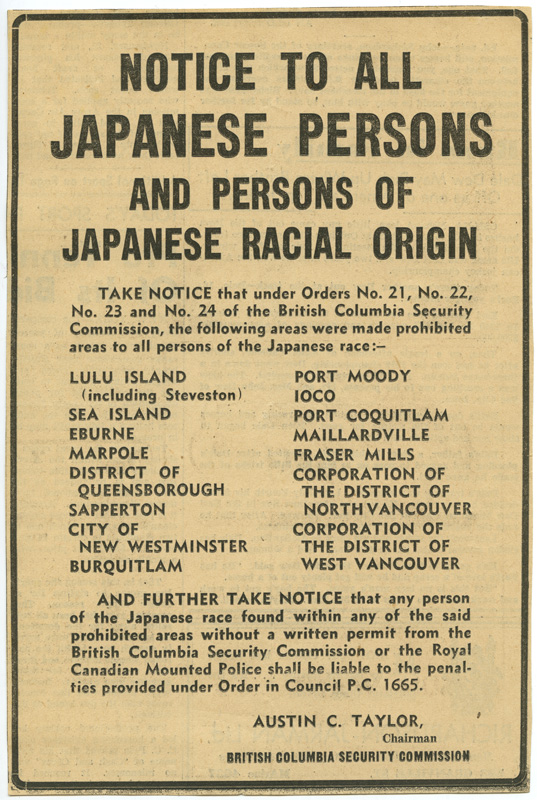
British Columbia Security Commission Japanese internment notice (1942)

21,000 Japanese Canadians (over 90% of the Japanese-Canadian population) were expelled from their homes, and their property and personal possessions were confiscated by the Custodian of Enemy Property. 700 men labelled as 'troublemakers' were sent to Prisoner of War Camp 101 in Angler, Ontario near Neys Provincial Park, 2,150 single men were sent to road labour camps, 3,500 people signed contracts to work on sugar beet farms outside British Columbia to avoid internment, and 3,000 were permitted to settle away from the coast at their own expense. The remaining 12,000 were relocated to government internment camps in the BC interior or elsewhere in Canada.

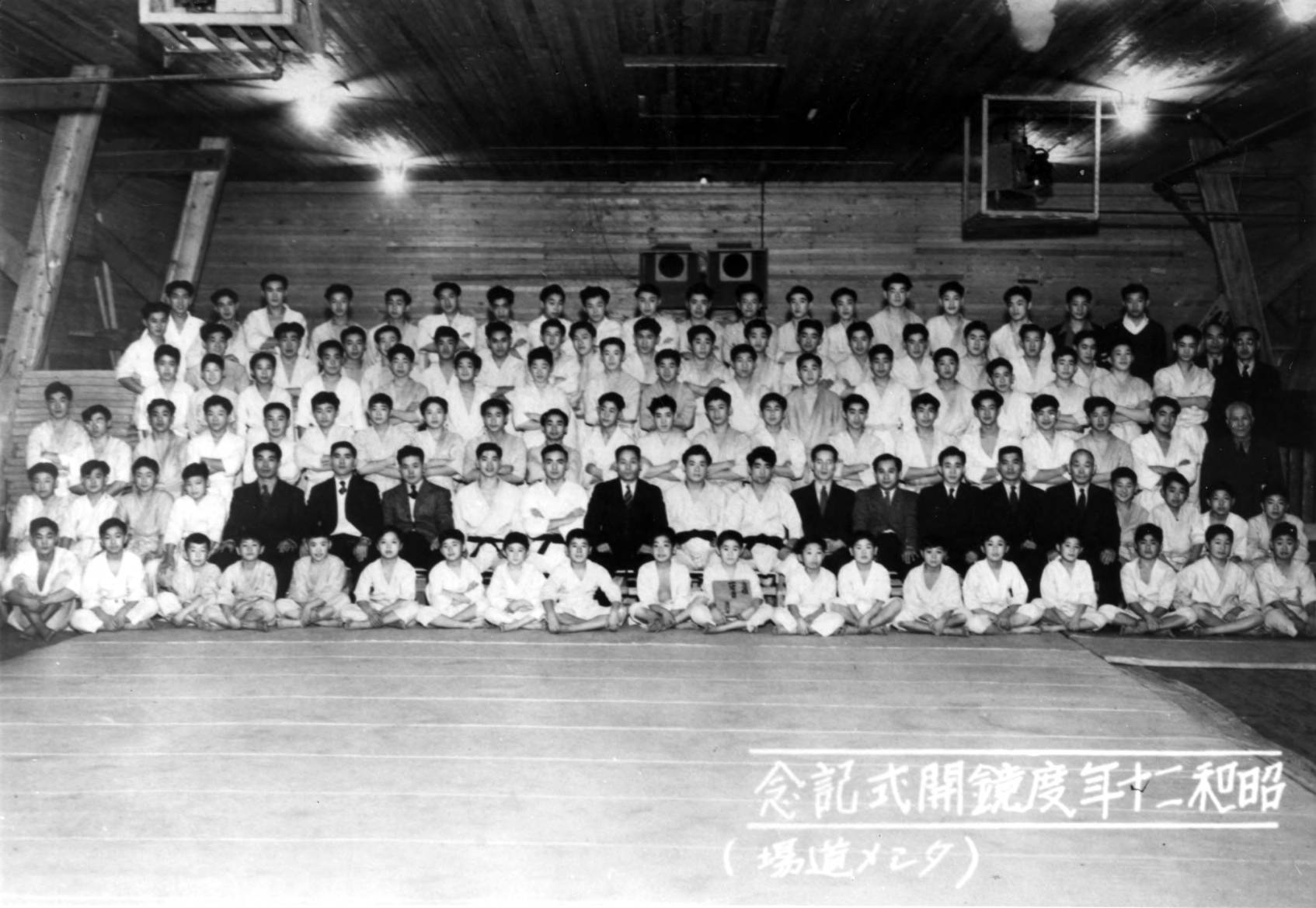
Judoka celebrating kagami biraki at Tashme Internment Camp

Judo played an important role in the life of many internees, and there were well-attended dojos at three camps: Tashme Internment Camp near Hope, British Columbia, Popoff Internment Camp in the Slocan Valley, British Columbia, and the Prisoner of War (POW) camp in Angler. Tashme, where Sasaki was head instructor, was the largest of the BC internment camps and many judoka were held there, reportedly at Sasaki's request and out of respect for his work with the RCMP. The head instructor at Popoff was Genichiro Nakahara, and Masato Ishibashi at the POW camp. Training was held on improvised tatami made from straw and canvas, with frequency ranging from twice a week at Tashme to daily at the POW camp. According to Robert Okazaki's diary from his time in the POW camp, "Despite food rationing, Mr. Masato Ishibashi and his judo students are excelling at their sport. Their training is awfully tough and their Kakegoe (sounds of hard practice) reverberates through the camp".

When the war ended in 1945 the government gave interned Japanese Canadians two options: resettlement outside of the 'Japanese exclusion zone' (within 100 miles of the Pacific coast) or 'voluntary repatriation' to Japan (despite the fact that most Japanese Canadians had been born in Canada). The majority agreed to move elsewhere in Canada, but approximately 10,000 refused to move and the government issued an order to deport them. 4,000 people were deported to Japan before the policy was abandoned due to public opposition. Japanese Canadians were prevented from returning to the exclusion zone until 1949. By then most of them had established themselves in other places, and there was nothing to go back to anyway because the Custodian of Enemy Property had sold all of their property and belongings. In 1988, after more than 40 years of lobbying by activists, the Canadian government issued a formal apology to Japanese Canadians for their internment and partially compensated those who were still alive for their confiscated property.

=== Spread to other parts of Canada ===
Japanese Canadian expulsion and internment was pivotal in the development of Canadian judo because it forced judoka to settle in other parts of the country. About a third returned to the Pacific coast after 1949, but most found new homes in other provinces, and by 1951 39.6% lived in Ontario, 33.1% in British Columbia, 21.8% in the Prairies, 5.2% in Quebec, 0.2% in Northern Canada, and 0.1% in Atlantic Canada. Dojos opened in the Prairies, Ontario, and Quebec in the mid-to-late 1940s and in British Columbia in the early-to-mid 1950s, and the centre of Canadian judo shifted from Vancouver to Toronto, where a significant number of judoka had settled after the war. The pattern is different in Atlantic Canada and Northern Canada where there were very few Japanese Canadians, judo was typically introduced 5–10 years later, and migrants from Europe played a more significant role. Many early dojos were housed at the local branch of the YMCA, which also provided short-term accommodation, assisted with finding employment, and coordinated social programs for resettled Japanese Canadians. Clubs at military bases, RCMP barracks, and universities were also common.

==== Alberta ====
Alberta's first judo club was founded in 1943 in Raymond, Alberta by Yoshio Katsuta and Yoshio Senda, both of whom moved from BC to Alberta to avoid being interned. Katsuta was born in Japan and had received his yondan (fourth dan) from the Kodokan before immigrating to Ocean Falls in 1937, and Senda was born in Mission and had earned his shodan (first dan) under Eichi "John" Hashizume and Yoshitaka Mori a few years before moving to Alberta. There were about 30 mostly Japanese Canadian students at the Raymond club, and practices were held in the reception room of the Raymond Buddhist Church. A year later, Hashizume (Senda's instructor in Mission) and a Mr. Kuramoto opened a dojo in Picture Butte. After the war, more than 300 displaced Japanese Canadians decided to stay in southern Alberta, and Senda established the Kyodokan Judo Club at the original Lethbridge YMCA building at 4th Avenue and 10th Street South in 1952.

==== Manitoba ====
Glen and George Pridmore, two brothers and police officers from the St. James area of Winnipeg, started a nominal judo club at the Central YMCA in 1937, but they reportedly taught a mix of jujutsu and other unarmed combat techniques and called it 'judo' because it was a popular term at the time. The club appears to have closed at some point and then reopened in 1947. Tomatsu "Tom" Mitani, who was born in Japan and moved from British Columbia to Manitoba to avoid internment in 1942, visited the Pridmore's club in 1948 and assigned two of his ikkyū (first kyū / brown belt) students to assist them (it is unclear if Mitani had been teaching judo during the six years since he had arrived in Winnipeg, but the fact he had students suggests that he was). Glen Pridmore left Winnipeg in 1949, and by 1950 Mitani had taken over the YMCA club and established branches with the help of Ron Fulton, Jack Kelly, and Jimmy Iwabuchi at Carpiquet Barracks, the RCAF base, and the RCMP barracks on Portage Avenue. The branches lasted about a year, and in 1951 Mitani moved the YMCA club to the RCMP barracks. Bob Demby started another, short-lived judo club at the YMCA, which was followed by a self-defence class organised by Ron Fulton that slowly became a judo club over the years. In 1952 Mitani established The Manitoba Judo Institute with the help of Harold Shimane and Noboru Shimizu, on the seventh floor of the McIntyre Block on Main Street. There was a club at the RCAF base again as early as 1956, organized by Flying Officer Vinsel and Leading Aircraftman Delasalle, and supported by Mitani (it may have operated sporadically or had different incarnations, as a 1960 article reports that it was founded by Masao Takahashi in 1958). The first club outside of Winnipeg was established at the Brandon YMCA in 1953 by Harold Starn, a former British special forces soldier who received his judo training from Japanese prisoners he guarded in Burma during the war.

==== Ontario ====
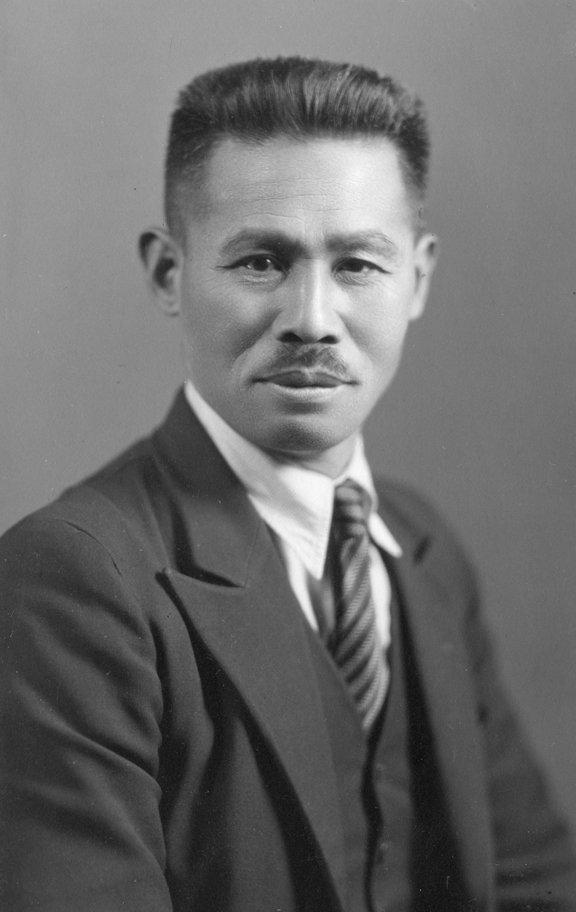
Photo of Atsumu Kamino taken sometime before 1942

The first judo club in Ontario was established at Prisoner of War Camp 101 in Angler, following Japanese internment in 1942. After the war, multiple dojos opened in Toronto from 1946 to 1947: Frank Mukai's club at the West End YMCA at 931 College Street, Atsumu Kamino's at the Church of All Nations at 423 Queen Street West, and Minoru "Frank" Hatashita's in a friend's garage. All three men were interned at Tashme, but left for Ontario by 1944 through a provision of the War Measures Act that allowed Japanese Canadians to move elsewhere in Canada if they could find employment. Kamino had started the Kitsilano branch of Kidokan (Tai Iku Dojo until it was renamed by Kano in 1932), and his Toronto dojo was called the Kidokwan Judo Institute after its Vancouver predecessor. The Hatashita Judo Club had several locations after it was established, including the basement of a restaurant on Carleton Street and a storefront at 131 Queen Street East. Dojos were also established outside of Toronto, such as Masatoshi Umetsu's Seikeikan Judo Club in Burlington, founded in 1946, and often in small towns such as Dryden, where Hiroshi "Rush" Mitani opened a club in 1952. Masao Takahashi, who had been a student of Kamino in Kitsilano and Katsuta in Raymond, organised a judo club at RCAF Station Rockcliffe in 1950, and did the same at several other RCAF bases when he was restationed.

==== Quebec ====
Hideo "Harold" Tokairin and Yutaka "Fred" Okimura moved from British Columbia to Montreal after the war and started the YMCA Judo Club in 1946. Okimura also established the McGill University Judo Club at the request of the Department of Athletics in 1950, making it the first organized university judo club in Canada. In 1952 Kametaro Akiyama, Okimura, and Tokairin opened the Seidokwan Academy of Judo on Rachel Street in a recreation centre un by the local Catholic parish. It was the first long-term community dojo in Montreal, was sponsored by many of the city's Japanese Canadians, and provided most of the instructors for the McGill club. Seidokwan changed locations several times over the years, but did not close its doors permanently until 2019. French judoka Marc Scala operated several dojos in Montreal in the early 1950s; the one located at 1423 Drummond Street went by the names "Canadian Academy of Judo" in 1953 and "North American Academy of Judo" in 1954, and was likely associated with the Downtown YMCA, which is directly adjacent to this address. Outside of Montreal, Bernard Gauthier began teaching judo and jujitsu in Gatineau and the surrounding area in the late 1940s, and established the Kano Judo Club in Hull in or around 1947. He also taught judo across the river in Ottawa, Ontario at the YMCA, the University of Ottawa, and Carleton University.

==== New Brunswick ====
Judo was first introduced to New Brunswick in 1955 by two sankyu (third kyū, green belt) German immigrants, Heinz Wazel and George Taenzer, who moved to Saint John and began practicing judo at the local YMCA. This attracted the attention of some of the other YMCA members, including Carl "Dutchie" Schell, and a small group referred to as both the Saint John Judo Club and the YMCA Judo Club was formed in January 1956. Wazel and Taenzer, who had been taught by Peter Neufeld in Germany, served as the instructors. At the Club's request, Frank Hatashita sent Vern Fagan to Saint John to instruct for almost a month in March 1956, and its members began making trips to Toronto to learn more at Hatashita's dojo. The Club also received guest instruction from Jon Bluming, a Dutch martial artist who was teaching judo in Halifax, Nova Scotia in 1958, and another dojo was established in Fredericton by RCMP Sergeant Melrose around the same time. In 1959 Schell, Harry Thomas, John Crawford, Ken Meating, and Doug Kearns left the YMCA Judo Club amicably to establish the Judo Shimpokai (named by Gunji Koizumi in collaboration with E.J. Harrison, the club's honorary president) at 15 Sydney Street, Saint John.

==== Yukon ====
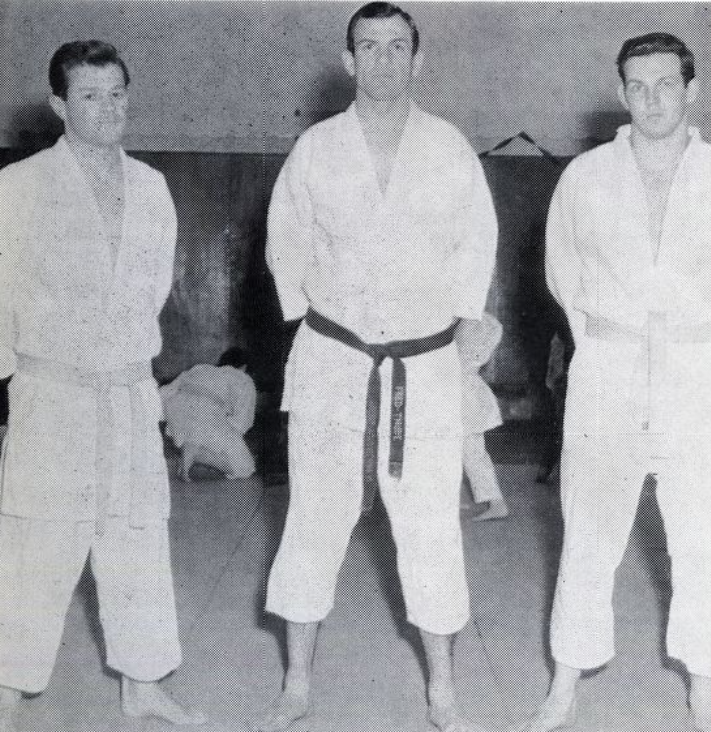
Keno Hill Judo Club instructors Gerd Scholz, Fred Thode, and Roy Hogarth (1969)

It is difficult to determine when judo was first introduced to Yukon, but it was taught to members of the Forest Girl Guards and Junior Forest Wardens as part of their physical education in 1950, and courses were offered at the Whitehorse Gymnasium in 1953. The first dedicated judo club was the Keno Hill Judo Club in Elsa, founded in 1960 by Laurie Wayman, who had earned his nidan (second dan) at the Budokwai in London, England, and received financial support from the Budokwai to purchase mats. It is likely that Wayman was an employee of United Keno Hill Mines Ltd., given that many club members were employees and Wayman's successor as instructor, Fred Thode, was a Project Engineer for the company. The club had 100 members at its peak.

==== Return to British Columbia ====
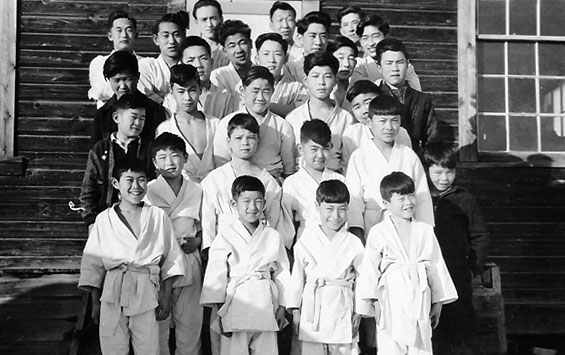
Vernon Judo Club in 1945

The Japanese-Canadian exclusion zone remained in effect until 1949 and judo did not return to the Pacific coast until two years later. Outside of the exclusion zone, the Vernon Judo Club was established with a police permit in 1944 by Yoshitaka Mori, who had been Hashizume's assistant in Mission (in a 1986 recollection, Shigetaka Sasaki wrote that in or around 1929 Mori went to Vernon as the head judo instructor for the Vernon Farmer's Association). This makes it the longest continuously operating judo club in Canada. Sasaki moved to Ashcroft in 1946 and opened a dojo there in 1948. The first dojo to reopen on the coast was the Vancouver Judo Club in 1951, in the old Ukrainian Hall at 600 East Cordova Street. The Steveston Judo Club reopened two years later in 1953, organized by Yonekazu "Frank" Sakai and Tomoaki "Tom" Doi with co-founders and instructors Seiichi Hamanishi, Takeo Kawasaki, Kunji Kuramoto, Yukio Mizuguchi, Kanezo Tokai, and Soichi Uyeyama, who were all local fishermen. After moving three times in three years, a major fundraising campaign led to the construction of a community centre in Steveston that opened in 1957, where the dojo remained until moving to the new Steveston Martial Arts Centre in 1971.

==== Other provinces and territories ====
The spread of judo to other Canadian provinces and territories is less well-documented. In Saskatchewan, where Japanese Canadians introduced judo in the mid-to-late 1940s, it followed a similar pattern to Alberta, Ontario, and Quebec. The Moose Jaw Judo Club was established around 1945 by Dave Pyle and Joe Guild, who had learned judo from two Japanese men interned at RCAF Station Moose Jaw during the war. The first dojo in Saskatoon was established at the YMCA by RCMP officer Gene Traynor in 1953, in the original YMCA building at the corner of 20th Street & Spadina Crescent.

The pattern was different in Atlantic Canada and Northern Canada, where migrants from Europe played a more significant role. In Nova Scotia, Dutch martial artist Jon Bluming taught judo at the YMCA and Dalhousie University in Halifax for about a year before moving to Tokyo in 1959. Perry Teale opened a dojo at the Stadacona naval base in 1960, after earning his black belt under Frank Hatashita during visits to Toronto. There were judo clubs at RCAF Station Summerside and the University in Prince Edward Island by the 1960s, but the dates of their establishment and people responsible are unclear. Newfoundland and Labrador's fist dojo appears to be the Memorial University Judo Club, founded by Yves LeGal in 1968. In the Northwest Territories (NWT) the first dojo appears to be the Yellowknife Judo Club, founded by Kurt Roder in 1968. He was assisted and possibly succeeded by Louis Tetteroo, who coached teams at the 1972 and 1974 Arctic Winter Games. Judo Nunavut is a program and club at Aqsarniit Middle School in Iqaluit that focuses on at-risk youth and was founded by Mario Des Forges in 2001.

==== Overseas military bases ====
There was at least one club at an overseas Canadian military base as early as the 1950s, the Kubokwai Judo Club at the Royal Canadian Air Force base at Baden-Baden, Germany. Richard "Tug" Wilson was the instructor in the late 1950s (he returned to Canada and was a member of the Winnipeg RCAF Judo Club by 1961), followed by Masao Takahashi in the early 1960s.

=== Organization ===
Before the war, Shigetaka Sasaki's Tai Iku Dojo / Kidokan was the de facto governing body of judo in Canada since nearly every dojo in the country was one of its branches. Circumstances were different after the war, and in 1946 Atsumu Kamino established the Canada Judo Yudanshakai (black belt association) in Toronto to help organize the administration of judo, including grading. Three years later, however, Bernard Gauthier of Hull, Quebec created the Canadian Judo Federation and had it chartered as Canada's official judo organization, which was recognized by the International Judo Federation (IJF) in 1952. Gauthier was not associated with the Japanese Canadians who had established judo in Canada or the Kodokan, and had instead learned judo through a Mr. Shimizu from the Japanese Embassy in Ottawa, Mikinosuke Kawaishi's books, and lessons from Marc Scala, one of Kawaishi's students who had moved from Paris to Montreal in 1950. There was some cooperation between the two organizations, but the Yudanshakai decided to reorganize in 1956 when Gauthier alone represented Canada at the first World Judo Championships in Tokyo.

The Canadian Kodokan Black Belt Association (CKBBA) was chartered in 1956, with Sasaki as its president; its name used 'Kodokan' instead of 'Judo' to differentiate it from Gauthier's organization and give it authority. In 1958, reportedly after the IJF was unable to contact Gauthier and the CKBBA provided last-minute representation at that year's World Judo Championships, the CKBBA was granted membership in the IJF and replaced the Canadian Judo Federation as the sole official governing body of judo in Canada. Nevertheless, when the International Olympic Committee announced in 1960 that judo would be included in the 1964 Summer Olympics in Tokyo, Gauthier lobbied the Canadian Olympic Association (COA) to allow his organization to select the judoka who would represent Canada at the Games. The COA held a hearing to determine which organization should have jurisdiction, and decided in favour of the CKBBA because it had members across the country and Gauthier's Federation was essentially limited to Quebec. The CKBBA has remained the official governing body of judo in Canada since that decision, and legally adopted its long-standing common name Judo Canada in 2011. Provincial associations were also established in every province by the end of the 1960s, in 1973 in the Northwest Territories, 1974 in Yukon, and 2001 in Nunavut, two years after it was separated from the NWT.

=== Growth and public interest ===
By the 1950s judo was growing across the country and more people began to take an interest. New competitions and clubs attracted both spectators and participants, and by 1960 there were more than 4,000 judoka in Canada, most of whom were not Japanese Canadian.

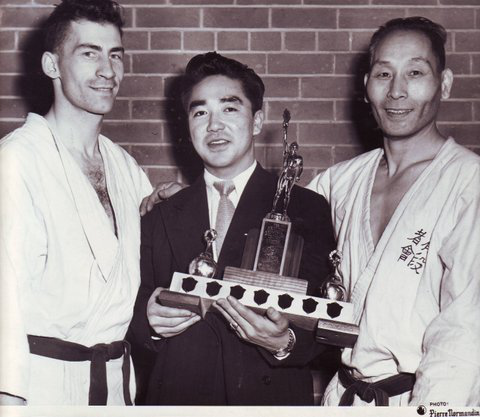
Bernard Gauthier, Masao Takahashi, and Shigetaka Sasaki at the first CJF National Championships in 1952

Bernard Gauthier's Canadian Judo Federation (CJF) sponsored its first Canadian Championships in 1952, held in Ottawa and won by Masao Takahashi, who was awarded a trophy donated by the Japanese embassy. The CJF organised at least one other national championship in Toronto, but most of the larger tournaments were regional rather than national until the Canadian Kodokan Black Belt Association (CKBBA) held its first Canadian Championships in Winnipeg in 1959. There were 15 competitors who qualified through three regional selection tournaments, no weight classes, about 1,500 spectators, and one winner: Manfred Matt of Vancouver, who also won the second Canadian Championships and represented Canada at the World Judo Championships in 1961.

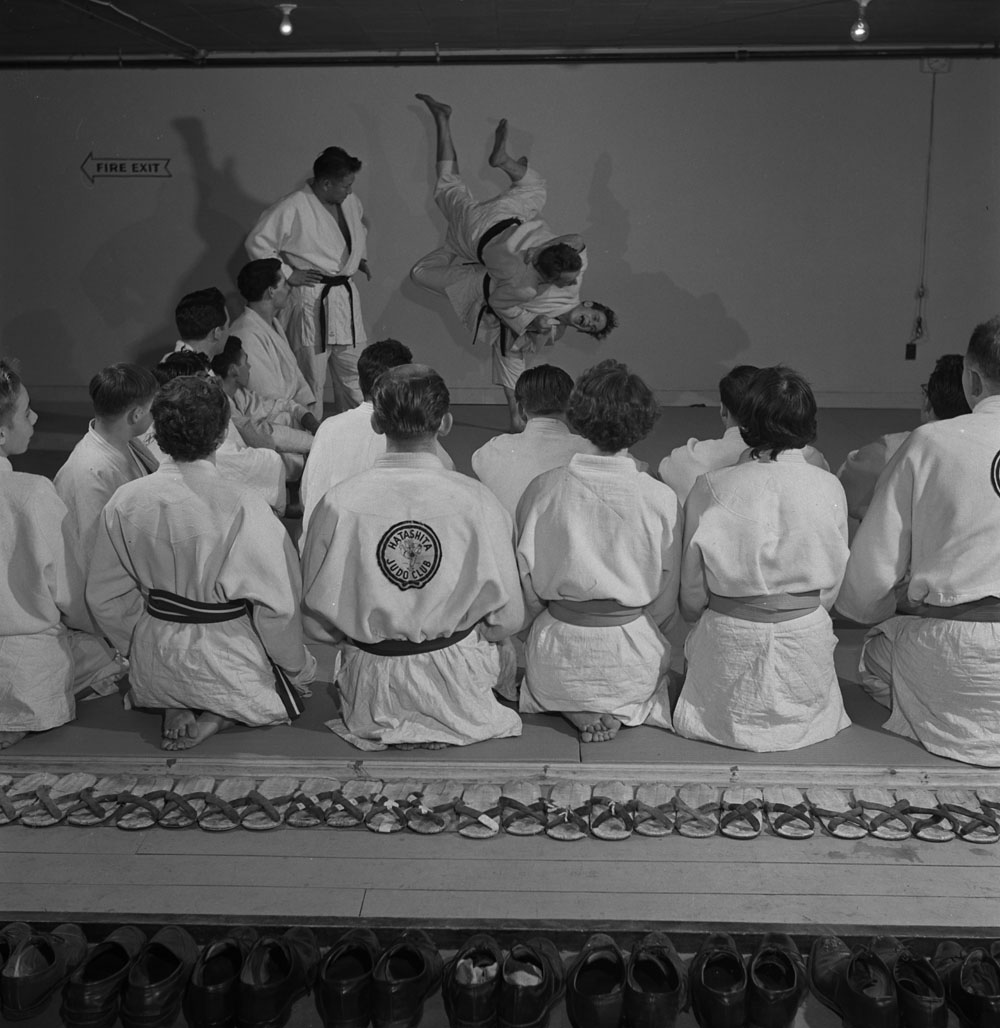
Frank Hatashita instructing a judo class in Toronto (1955)

The number or judo clubs in Canada increased significantly during the 1950s and 60s, especially in Ontario and Quebec in large part due to the efforts of Frank Hatashita and Raymond Damblant, who both played a role similar to Shigetaka Sasaki in the pre-war period. Hatashita, who first learned judo in British Columbia and later trained with Sasaki and Kamino at Tashme internment camp, moved to Toronto and turned judo into his full-time business after the war, making him the first professional judoka in Canada. Nicknamed "Canada's Mr. Judo", he promoted judo outside of the Japanese Canadian community by putting on public demonstrations and clinics, writing articles for newspapers, publishing the monthly Judo News Bulletin (which was renamed Canadian Judo News, then Judo World), and even appeared in a 1955 episode of the CBC television show Tabloid meant to introduce Japanese culture to Canadians. Hatashita also played a major organizational role, sponsoring close to 100 judo clubs across Ontario, and serving as President of the CKBBA and Pan American Judo Union and Vice President of the International Judo Federation.

Damblant was Hatashita's counterpart in Quebec. He moved from France to Montreal in 1959 to help promote judo in the province on behalf of the French Judo Federation. Damblant began travelling around Quebec's regions to provide instruction and help organize local judo associations, and he consolidated the provincial administration of judo by reorganizing the Quebec Kodokan Judo Black Belt Association in 1966 and serving as its first President. When Damblant first arrived in Quebec there were only 10 dojos, and he is credited with spearheading the infrastructure that led to about 120 clubs and 10,000 judoka in Quebec today.

==== Women in judo ====
Judo was initially restricted to men due to patriarchal gender roles and mistaken ideas about the physical differences between the sexes. Some women were taught judo as early as the 1890s, but the Kodokan did not allow women to train regularly until 1923, and even then they were restricted to kata and randori and forbidden from competition. Canada followed the Kodokan's lead until the 1970s, when judo associations in Europe and North America began organizing women's tournaments. The first Women's Canadian Judo Championships were held in Montreal in 1976. The first Women's World Judo Championships were held in New York in 1980, and men and women have competed separately at the same World Judo Championships events since 1987. Women's judo was a demonstration sport at the 1988 Seoul Olympics, where Sandra Greaves became Canada's first female competitor and Tina Takahashi its first female coach at the Olympics, and it has been a full-fledged Olympic sport since the Barcelona Olympics in 1992 (see 'List of Canadian judoka' for the names of everyone who has represented Canada at the World Judo Championships and the Olympics, and 'Competition' for medal results).

While participation in competition was delayed, women had been able to practice judo in Canada since Sasaki opened Tai Iku Dojo in 1924, though it was uncommon before the war. A 1960 article in Maclean's magazine titled "Judo Tightening Grip on Canada" reports that "scores" of women had taken up judo by that time. The first woman to be promoted to shodan (first dan, black belt) was Elaine McCossan at the Hatashita Judo Club in Toronto in 1959. As of 2021, thousands of Canadian women have earned a black belt, about 10 are kōdansha (sixth dan or higher), and the highest-ranked women are Gisèle Gravel of Saguenay, Quebec and June Takahashi of Ottawa, both shichidan (seventh dan, red and white belt).

==== 1964 Olympics ====
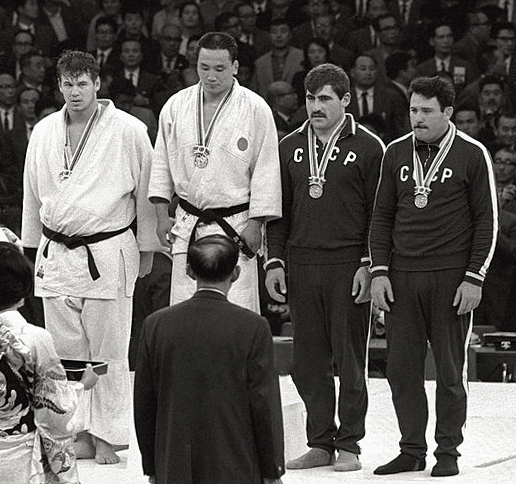
Doug Rogers (left) receiving a silver medal at the Tokyo Olympics (1964)

Jigoro Kano was the first Asian member of the International Olympic Committee (IOC). He had reservations about adding judo to the Olympics because of the Games' focus on sport and encouragement of nationalism, but he did not object to it and in 1937 the IOC decided that judo would be a demonstration sport at the 1940 Olympics in Tokyo. Those Games were cancelled due to the war, however, and judo did not make its Olympic debut until 24 years later at the 1964 Olympics in Tokyo. This was the first time an Asian sport had been included in the Games and it generated significant interest in judo worldwide. Coupled with the Kodokan's long-term efforts to spread judo around the world, judo became the first Asian martial art to gain a worldwide following.

Some countries put significant effort into readying their judo competitors for the 1964 Olympics, but Canada was not one of them. In fact, the Canadian Olympic Association (CAO) did not plan to send any judoka to Japan until Frank Hatashita, who was President of the Canadian Kodokan Black Belt Association at the time, led a publicity campaign to add Doug Rogers to the Olympic team. Rogers, who was born in Truro, Nova Scotia, had begun studying judo in Montreal and moved to Tokyo in 1960 at the age of 19 to train full-time at the Kodokan. The CAO agreed to let him compete in the Olympics with Hatashita as his coach because Rogers was already based in Japan, but resisted paying for him to return there from Canada after he competed in 1964 Canadian Championships ahead of the Olympics, providing just a one-way ticket in the end. Rogers won the silver medal in the heavyweight category: it made him famous in Japan, sparked "a boom in the sport in his native land", and for a time he was almost a household name in Canada. The National Film Board of Canada even sent a crew to Japan to produce a short film titled Judoka (1965), which documents Rogers' post-Olympics life and intense training under the famous Masahiko Kimura.

==== Organizational development ====
In its early years the Canadian Kodokan Blackbelt Association (CKBBA) was entirely dependent on membership fees and donations. In the early 1960s, 80% of its funding was based on dues from 986 members: 309 yudansha (black belts), and 677 mudansha (non-black belts). Frank Hatashita became President of the CKBBA in 1961 and held the position until 1978, overseeing major organizational changes including recognition and funding from Sport Canada, more domestic competitions and greater participation in international tournaments, and the establishment of a national office in Vanier, Ontario with a paid professional staff.

==== International competition ====
Poster advertising judo at the 1976 Olympics in Montreal

Since Doug Rogers' success at the 1964 Olympics, Canada has sent at least five and as many as fourteen judoka to every World Judo Championships and Summer Olympics, except for 1968 when judo was not included in the Olympics, and 1980 when Canada boycotted the Moscow Olympics in protest of the Soviet Union's invasion of Afghanistan (see 'List of Canadian judoka' for the names of everyone who has represented Canada at the World Judo Championships and the Olympics, and 'Competition' for medal results). Rogers won bronze at the 1965 World Judo Championships, and some of his Canadian contemporaries won medals at other international tournaments—especially the Pan American Games—but no other Canadian made it to the podium at the highest level again until Kevin Doherty and Phil Takahashi from Ontario won bronze in their respective weight categories at the 1981 World Judo Championships, and Mark Berger from Manitoba won bronze at the 1984 Olympics.Canada's most competitively successful judoka is Nicolas Gill, who won bronze at the 1992 Barcelona Olympics, silver at the 2000 Sydney Olympics, and bronze at three World Championships. Gill was coached by Hiroshi Nakamura, whose Shidokan Judo Club in Montreal served as the National Training Centre until 2014.

Canada has also hosted a variety of major international judo tournaments, including the Pan American Games (1967, 1999, and 2015), the Pan American Judo Championships (1992, 2007, 2012, and 2015), the 1996 World University Judo Championships, the 2000 Commonwealth Judo Championships, and the 2001 Jeux de la Francophonie. The two highest-level tournaments hosted in Canada are the 1976 Olympics in Montreal and the 1993 World Judo Championships in Hamilton, Ontario. The Olympic judo tournament was held at the Olympic Park Velodrome (now the Biodome), which was considered a poor venue choice because the spectators were at least 60 metres (197 feet) away from the mats on the other side of the cycling track.

==== Judo for people with disabilities ====
Judo is also practiced by people with disabilities, most commonly visual impairment. While judo for the visually impaired is often referred to as 'blind judo', it includes athletes with three different levels of visual impairment (ranging from blind to partially sighted), all of whom may compete against one another so long as they are in the same weight category. It became a Paralympic sport in 1988 for men and 2004 for women, and the only differences from Olympic judo are that competitors take hold of their opponent before the start of the match and the mat has different textures to indicate zones and the competition area.

Judo for the visually impaired has a long history in Canada. It is unclear when visually impaired judoka first began training in Canada, but Bernard Gauthier established the Ottawa YMCA Blind Men's Judo Club sometime in or before 1952, when he claimed that it was the only judo club for the blind in the world. Dedicated clubs are rare, however, and in most cases visually impaired and non-impaired judoka belong to the same clubs and practice together.

People with other disabilities also practice judo, and Judo Canada has established guidelines for including judoka who are deaf, have special needs, or have intellectual disabilities. Sometimes this takes the form of dedicated clubs, such as the now-closed Jita Kyoei Judo Club at the Community Head Injury Resource Services in Toronto, which catered to people with Acquired brain injury.

Canada was first represented in international competition for the visually impaired by brothers Pier Morten and Eddie Morten at the European Open Blind Judo Championships in 1987, and both brothers won bronze in their weight categories the following year at the 1988 Paralympics in Seoul. Pier, who is the first deafblind person in the world to earn a black belt in judo, also won bronze at the Paralympics in 1992 and 2000, making him Canada's most competitively successful disabled judoka (see 'List of Canadian judoka' for the names of everyone who has represented Canada at the Paralympics, and 'Competition' for medal results).

Some disabled Canadian judoka compete in the non-disabled domestic and international circuits. David Miller, for example, is legally blind in one eye and won the Canadian National Championships in the +95 kg category and represented Canada in the open weight category at the World Judo Championships in 1995.

=== Present day ===
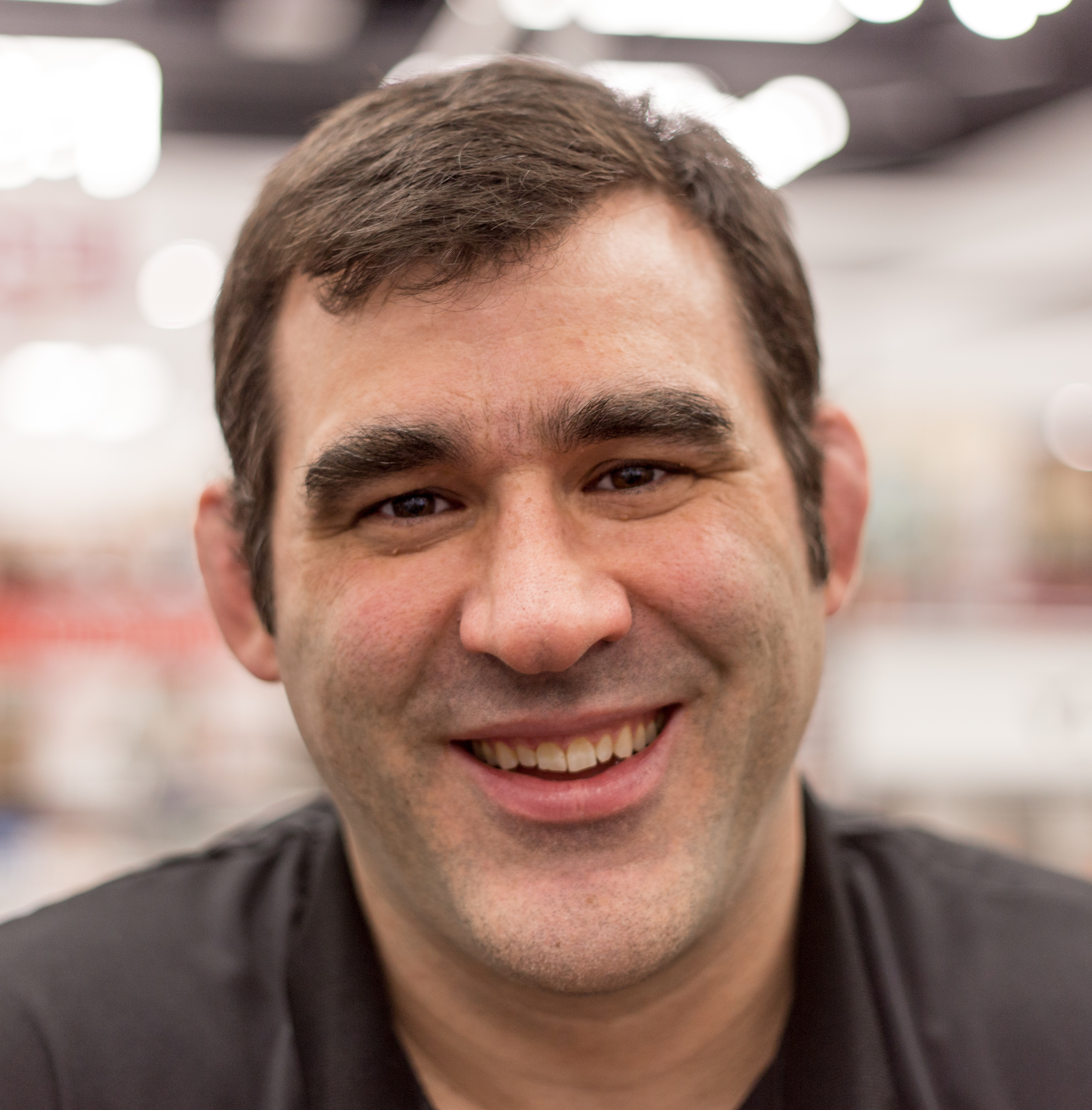
Nicolas Gill, one of Canada's most successful international competitors and CEO of Judo Canada

Today there are about 400 judo clubs and approximately 25,000 judoka in Canada, and it is most popular in Quebec where there are around 120 clubs and 10,000 judoka. That popularity is partly driven by the success of Nicolas Gill, who still receives attention in Canada's French-language press more than 15 years after his retirement from competition, and Antoine Valois-Fortier's bronze at the 2012 London Olympics, which began a new era in high-level Canadian judo.

Valois-Fortier's bronze at the 2012 London Olympics was Canada's first Olympic medal in judo since Gill's silver in 2000 and led to increased funding from Sport Canada and other funding agencies that significantly improved Judo Canada's training capacity. According to Own the Podium, the organization that plans and coordinates most high-level amateur sport investment in Canada, its four-year funding recommendations for Olympic judo increased from $1,870,000 for London 2012 to $3,109,830 for Rio de Janeiro 2016 and $5,169,500 for Tokyo 2020 (in a five-year period due to the COVID-19 pandemic), and from nothing to $125,000 for the 2020 Paralympics.

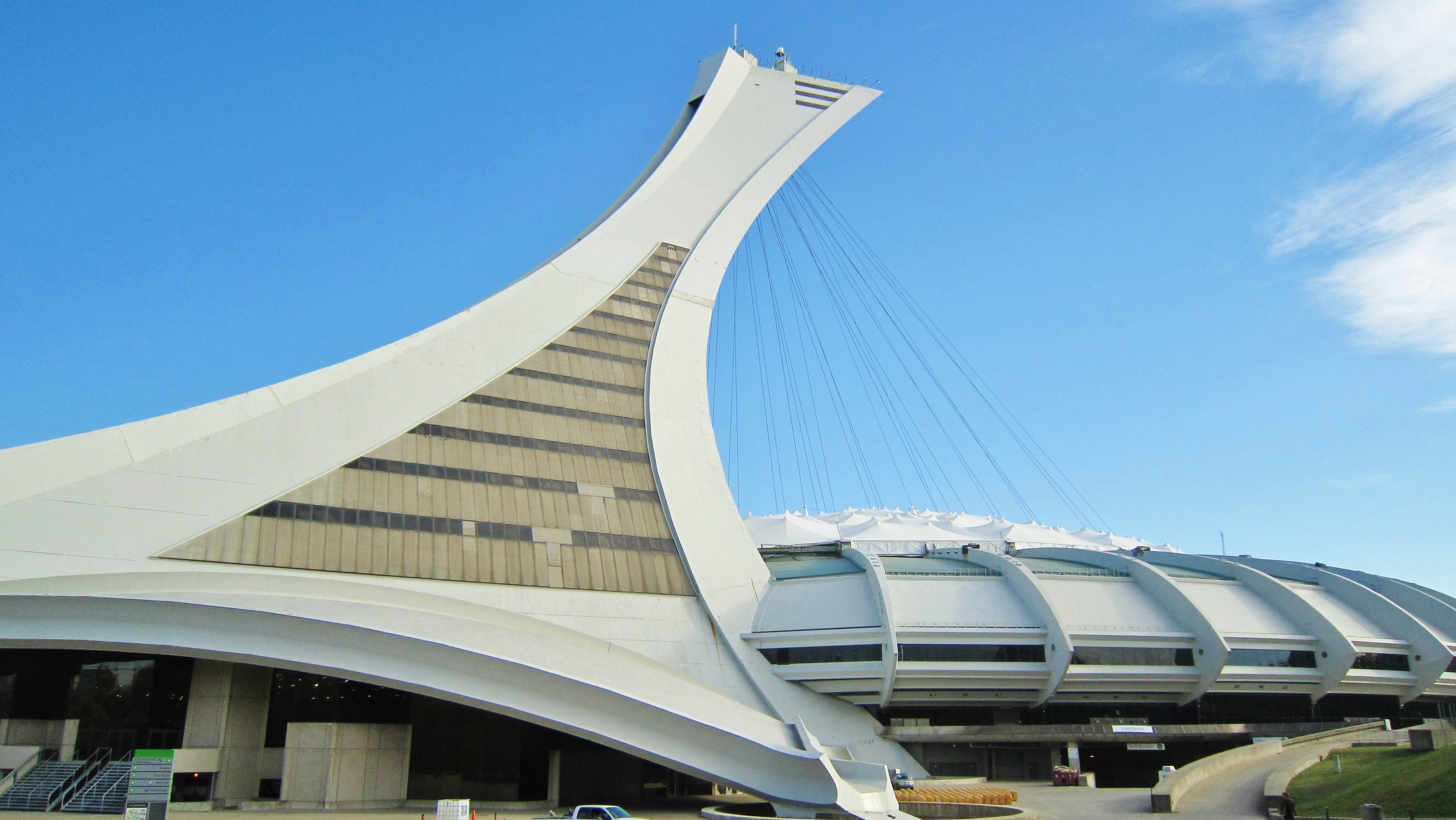
The Judo Canada National Training Centre is housed in the Quebec National Institute of Sport at Montreal's Olympic Stadium

This has led to major changes. In 2014, Judo Canada moved its National Training Centre from Shidokan Judo Club to the Quebec National Institute of Sport at Montreal's Olympic Stadium, where the national office was also moved after Gill became CEO of Judo Canada in 2016. The new training facilities have twice the mat space of the previous centre, a weight and conditioning room with new equipment, and sport science specialists on staff. Gill, who coached the national team from 2009 to 2016, said that "the equipment is of better quality and the space is much better. There's no possible comparison. In the current sports system, it's a step in the right direction. The athletes were visibly excited about their new training facilities". Two other Regional Training Centres have also been established at Kyodokan Judo Club in Lethbridge, Alberta and the Toronto Pan Am Sports Centre in Scarborough, Ontario.

While Valois-Fortier did not place again in the 2016 or the 2020 Olympics, he won silver at the 2014 World Judo Championships and bronze in 2015 and 2019, making him Canada's second-most competitively successful judoka at the highest levels after Gill. Other Canadians have also had recent success at the highest levels. Christa Deguchi, who was born and resides in Japan but has Canadian citizenship through her father, joined the Canadian team in 2017 and won bronze in 2018 and gold in 2019 at the World Judo Championships, making her the first Canadian World Champion. Priscilla Gagné won bronze at the 2018 IBSA World Judo Championships and silver at the 2019 IBSA World Games, eight Canadians won medals at the Junior (under 21) or Cadet (under 18) World Judo Championships, and Jessica Klimkait won gold at the 2021 World Judo Championships in the -57 kg category, the same as her domestic rival Deguchi.

At the 2020 Tokyo Olympics Jessica Klimkait and Catherine Beauchemin-Pinard became the first Canadian women in to win Olympic medals in judo, and Arthur Margelidon and Shady Elnahas both placed fifth in their weight categories after losing bronze medal matches (judo has two bronze medals in every category due to repechage). These results make it Canada's most successful Olympic judo tournament in history. At the 2020 Paralympics, Priscilla Gagné became both the first Canadian woman to win a medal and the first Canadian to win silver in Paralympic judo.

== Ranking ==
Judo uses a hierarchical ranking system divided into kyū and dan grades adapted from the ranking system for the traditional board game Go. Kyū grades are for people ranked below black belt (mudansha, or 'ones without dan'), and dan grades are for those who have a black belt (yūdansha, or 'ones with dan'). A person's rank is represented by a number, and the names of each grade are a combination of the name of the number in Japanese and the appropriate suffix (kyū or dan). For kyū grades, this number goes down with each promotion, from sixth kyū (rokkyū) to first kyū (ikkyū). For dan grades, the number goes up with each promotion, from first dan (shodan) to tenth dan (jūdan). Grades are also differentiated by belt colour. Jigoro Kano originally adopted white and black belts in 1886 to mark the distinction between kyū and dan grades, and red and white and solid red belts were later introduced to distinguish yūdansha who are sixth dan and higher (kōdansha, or 'ones with high dan'). Coloured belts for kyū grades were first introduced by Mikinosuke Kawaishi in France in 1935 because he felt that European students would progress more quickly if they received visible recognition of their achievements.

In Canada there are six kyū grades for seniors (people 16 years of age or older), eleven kyū grades for juniors (people under the age of 16), and ten dan grades that are restricted to seniors. Both senior and junior students begin as white belts (rokkyū, sixth kyū) and progress with promotion through yellow, orange, green, and blue to brown belt (ikkyū, first kyū). Half-grades for juniors are represented by belts that combine the colours of the previous grade and the next grade (a white and yellow belt, for example, represents a half-grade between rokkyū and gokyū, which the grading syllabus calls "6th+ kyū"). The first five dan grades (shodan to godan) are represented by a black belt. Judoka ranked sixth to eighth dan may wear a red and white belt, and those ranked ninth or tenth dan may wear a solid red belt, but this is not required and the black belt remains the standard for all dan grades. In the past women's belts would include a white stripe in the centre of the length of the belt to differentiate them from men, but this is much less common now.

Standard kyū grades
Grade	6th	5th	4th	3rd	2nd	1st
Name	Rokkyū	Gokyū	Yonkyū	Sankyū	Nikyū	Ikkyū
Colour						
Age	–	6	8	10	12	14

Dan grades
Grade	1st	2nd	3rd	4th	5th	6th	7th	8th	9th	10th
Name	Shodan	Nidan	Sandan	Yondan	Godan	Rokudan	Shichidan	Hachidan	Kudan	Jūdan
Colour										
Age	15	17	20	24	29	37	47	57	67	77
Time	1 yr	2 yrs	3 yrs	4 yrs	5 yrs	8 yrs	10 yrs	10 yrs	10 yrs	10 yrs
Points	100	170	215	300	360	–	–	–	–	–

=== Grading and promotion ===
Kudan (9th dan)
Raymond Damblant†
Yeiji Inouye†
Hiroshi Nakamura
Mamoru Oye
Yoshio Senda†

Hachidan (8th dan)
William Doherty
Vincent Grifo
Frank Hatashita†
Mitchell Kawasaki
Jim Kojima
Yves LeGal
Yoshitaka Mori†
Tom Mukai
Genichiro Nakahara†
Yutaka Okimura†
Yonekazu Sakai†
Shigetaka Sasaki†
Masao Takahashi†
Satoru Tamoto†
Goki Uemura†
Duncan Vignale

Promotions are regulated by Judo Canada using guidelines set by the National Grading Board, but most of the responsibility for grading is delegated to other organizations. All kyū grade promotions are based on examination at the student's club by its technical director or grading board following the Judo Canada grading syllabus. Shodan (first dan) to hachidan (eighth dan) promotions in the 'technical stream' are based on examination by a regional grading board and must be ratified by Judo Canada; 'competitive stream' judoka can be promoted through success in tournaments. Kudan (ninth dan) and jūdan (tenth dan) promotions are rare honours that are conferred directly by Judo Canada, the International Judo Federation, or the Kodokan.

==== Kyū grades ====
The time between promotions for kyū grades varies, and is based on a combination of technical skill, physical fitness, age, regular class attendance, frequency of classes per week, student–teacher ratio, facilities and equipment, and the disposition of the student. Students must be at least 6 years old to be promoted and at least 15 years old to be eligible to test for black belt. Each kyū promotion requires a test of proficiency in a specific set of techniques. The foundation of the syllabus is Kano's revised Gokyo no Waza ('five sets of techniques') from 1920, which covers judo's 40 fundamental throws. There are now 67 official throws, however, and Judo Canada's syllabus does not directly match each stage of the Gokyo (which is divided into five sets that correspond with the five graded kyū). Some throws are now associated with different grades than indicated in the Gokyo, the 27 throws that were added in 1982 and 1997 have been incorporated into the curriculum at various stages, and each kyū also requires proficiency in certain hold-downs, arm-locks, strangles and chokes (the last three are restricted to seniors).Students are also expected to remain proficient in all techniques associated with their previous grades and learn judo's history and standard Japanese terms.

==== Dan grades ====
The requirements for dan promotion are more demanding. As of 2021, to test for shodan (first dan, black belt) the applicant must be at least 15 years old, have been an ikkyū (first kyū, brown belt) for at least one year, have been active in judo with a paid association membership for at least three years, and have 100 points. Points can be earned through competition, technical activities such as attending an instructional clinic or assisting with club development, volunteering at judo events, and consistent class attendance on a yearly basis, depending on whether the person has chosen the 'competitive' or 'technical' promotion stream. Candidates in the competitive stream can be promoted without formal grading based on success in tournaments. Technical stream candidates complete an examination that includes: (1) demonstration of eight throws, three hold downs, three strangles or chokes, and three arm-locks, all chosen by the examiners at the time of the examination; (2) demonstration of the ability to successfully apply such techniques at full force and speed against a resisting opponent in randori (free practice); and (3) demonstration of the first three sets of the Nage-no-kata as tori (the person executing the throws). Second to tenth dan have similar but progressively higher requirements, with the necessary minimum age, time in current grade, number of points, and the number and type of techniques to be demonstrated increasing with each grade. Junior national-level and senior international-level competitors may also be promoted by batsugun (outstanding performance in designated competitions).

=== High-ranking Canadians ===
Only fifteen people have been promoted to jūdan (tenth dan, red belt) by the Kodokan, and there are eight jūdan not recognised by the Kodokan who were promoted by the International Judo Federation. None of them are Canadian, but Canada does have a group of about 150 kōdansha ranked sixth dan or higher, all of whom have devoted much of their lives to Canadian judo.

The late Yoshio Senda became Canada's first kudan (ninth dan, red belt) in 2007, and since then four more Canadians have been promoted to kudan by Judo Canada: Yeiji Inouye (2011), Raymond Damblant (2012), Hiroshi Nakamura (2012), and Mamoru Oye (2021). As of 2021, sixteen Canadians are ranked hachidan (eighth dan, red and white belt), thirty-seven are ranked shichidan (seventh dan, red and white belt), and about 90 are ranked rokudan (sixth dan, red and white belt). Tony Walby became the first visually impaired Canadian judoka to be promoted to rokudan in 2021. The names of the ninth and eighth dan holders are listed in the tables to the right; a typographic dagger (†) follows the names of those who are deceased. A registry of approximately 5000 black belts from 1946–1997 is included in the first edition Glynn Leyshon's book Judoka: a History of Judo in Canada, and a list of all Canadians ranked rokudan or higher as of 2019 is included in the second edition.

== Competition ==
Medal record

Olympic Games
Gold medal – first place	Christa Deguchi	2024
Bronze medal – third place	Catherine Beauchemin-Pinard	2020
Bronze medal – third place	Jessica Klimkait	2020
Bronze medal – third place	Antoine Valois-Fortier	2012
Silver medal – second place	Nicolas Gill	2000
Bronze medal – third place	Nicolas Gill	1992
Bronze medal – third place	Mark Berger	1984
Silver medal – second place	Doug Rogers	1964

World Judo Championships
Silver medal – second place	Christa Deguchi	2024
Silver medal – second place	Shady Elnahas	2024
Bronze medal – third place	Jessica Klimkait	2024
Gold medal – first place	Christa Deguchi	2023
Bronze medal – third place	Jessica Klimkait	2023
Silver medal – second place	Catherine Beauchemin-Pinard	2022
Bronze medal – third place	Jessica Klimkait	2022
Silver medal – second place	Kyle Reyes	2022
Gold medal – first place	Jessica Klimkait	2021
Gold medal – first place	Christa Deguchi	2019
Bronze medal – third place	Antoine Valois-Fortier	2019
Bronze medal – third place	Christa Deguchi	2018
Bronze medal – third place	Antoine Valois-Fortier	2015
Silver medal – second place	Antoine Valois-Fortier	2014
Bronze medal – third place	Nicolas Gill	1999
Bronze medal – third place	Nicolas Gill	1995
Silver medal – second place	Nicolas Gill	1993
Bronze medal – third place	Kevin Doherty	1981
Bronze medal – third place	Phil Takahashi	1981
Bronze medal – third place	Doug Rogers	1965

=== Olympics ===
Canadians have won eight Olympic medals in judo since it was added to the Summer games in 1964. Doug Rogers won silver in the +80 kg category in 1964, Mark Berger won bronze in the +95 kg category in 1984, Nicolas Gill won bronze in the 86 kg category in 1992 and silver in the 100 kg category in 2000, Antoine Valois-Fortier won bronze in the -81 kg category in 2012, both Jessica Klimkait (-57 kg) and Catherine Beauchemin-Pinard (-63 kg) won bronze at the 2020 Tokyo Olympics, held in 2021 due to the COVID-19 pandemic, and Christa Deguchi won gold in the -57 kg category at the 2024 Paris Olympics.

=== World Championships ===
Twenty medals have been awarded to Canadians at the World Judo Championships. Rogers won bronze in the +80 kg category in 1965, Phil Takahashi won bronze in the -60 kg category and Kevin Doherty won bronze in the -78 kg category in 1981; Gill won silver in the 86 kg category in 1993, bronze in 1995, and bronze in 100 kg in 1999; Valois-Fortier won silver (2014) and bronze (2015, 2019) in the -81 kg category; Christa Deguchi won bronze (2018), silver (2024), and gold (2019, 2023) in the -57 kg category; and Jessica Klimkait won gold (2021) and bronze (2022, 2023, 2024) in the -57 kg category; Kyle Reyes won silver (2022) in the -100 kg category; Catherine Beauchemin-Pinard won silver (2022) in the -63 kg category; and Shady Elnahas won silver (2024) in the -100 kg category.

Jessica Klimkait (-51 kg) and Louis Krieber-Gagnon (-81 kg) both won gold at the 2013 World Cadets Judo Championships.

=== Paralympics & IBSA Championships ===
Medal record

Paralympic Games
Silver medal – second place	Priscilla Gagné	2020
Bronze medal – third place	Pier Morten	2000
Bronze medal – third place	Pier Morten	1992
Bronze medal – third place	Eddie Morten	1988
Bronze medal – third place	Pier Morten	1988

IBSA World Games
Silver medal – second place	Priscilla Gagné	2019
Bronze medal – third place	William Morgan	2003
Bronze medal – third place	Pier Morten	1998

IBSA World Judo Championships
Silver medal – second place	Priscilla Gagné	2022
Bronze medal – third place	Priscilla Gagné	2018
Bronze medal – third place	William Morgan	2006

Canada was first represented in international competition for the visually impaired by brothers Pier Morten and Eddie Morten at the 1988 Paralympics, where they each won bronze in the -65 kg and -71 kg categories, respectively. Pier, who is the first deaf-blind person in the world to earn a black belt in judo and was inducted into the Judo Canada Hall of Fame in 2012, also won bronze in the -71 kg category in 1992 and the -73 kg category in 2000 at the Paralympics, making him Canada's most successful visually impaired judoka. Priscilla Gagné won silver in the -52 kg category at the 2020 Paralympics. William Morgan placed fifth in the 2004 and seventh in the 2008 Paralympics, where he was Canada's only competitor. Tom Thompson coached the Paralympic judo team from 2000 to 2014, when he was replaced by Andrzej Sądej. A video of Morgan explaining Paralympic judo is available in the 'External links' section below.

Pier Morten won bronze at the first IBSA World Games in 1998, William Morgan won bronze in the -81 kg category at the IBSA World Games in 2003 and the -100 kg category at the IBSA World Judo Championships in 2006, and Priscilla Gagné won bronze in the -52 kg category in 2018 and silver in the -57 kg category in 2022. Gagné also won silver at the 2019 IBSA Judo International Qualifier, which is equivalent to the IBSA World Games but was held instead of the latter because the IBSA could not find a suitable host for a full edition of the Games.

=== Regional ===
Canada's greatest success in international competition has been at the Pan American Games, with a total of 84 medals (15 gold, 23 silver, and 46 bronze) awarded since 1967, the fourth-highest medal count out of 20 countries (see 'Judo at the Pan American Games' for a list of the results).

== Recognition of public service ==
=== Domestic ===
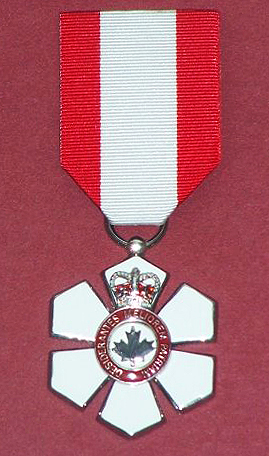
Member of the Order of Canada medal

Four judoka have been awarded Membership in the Order of Canada, the country's second highest civilian honour of merit, for outstanding contributions to their communities through judo: James Driscoll (1978), Yuzuru "Jim" Kojima (1983), Yoshio Senda (2008), and Hiroshi Nakamura (2013).

Five judoka are members of the Canadian Olympic Hall of Fame: Doug Rogers as an athlete (1973), and Minoru "Frank" Hatashita (1974), Yoshio Senda (1977), and Shigetaka Sasaki (1986), and Hiroshi Nakamura (2019) as 'builders' (officials, administrators, and volunteers).

In 2002 Jim Kojima and Yoshio Senda were awarded the Queen Elizabeth II Golden Jubilee Medal.

In 2012 at least thirteen judoka were awarded the Queen Elizabeth II Diamond Jubilee Medal by the Canadian Olympic Committee as either athletes (including the entire 2012 Olympic team) or builders: Fred Blaney, Amy Cotton, Mario Des Forges, Alexandre Émond, Gisèle Gravel, Jim Kojima, Sasha Mehmedovic, Joliane Melançon, Hiroshi Nakamura, Sérgio Pesoa, Nicholas Tritton, Antoine Valois-Fortier, and Kelita Zupancic.

=== International ===
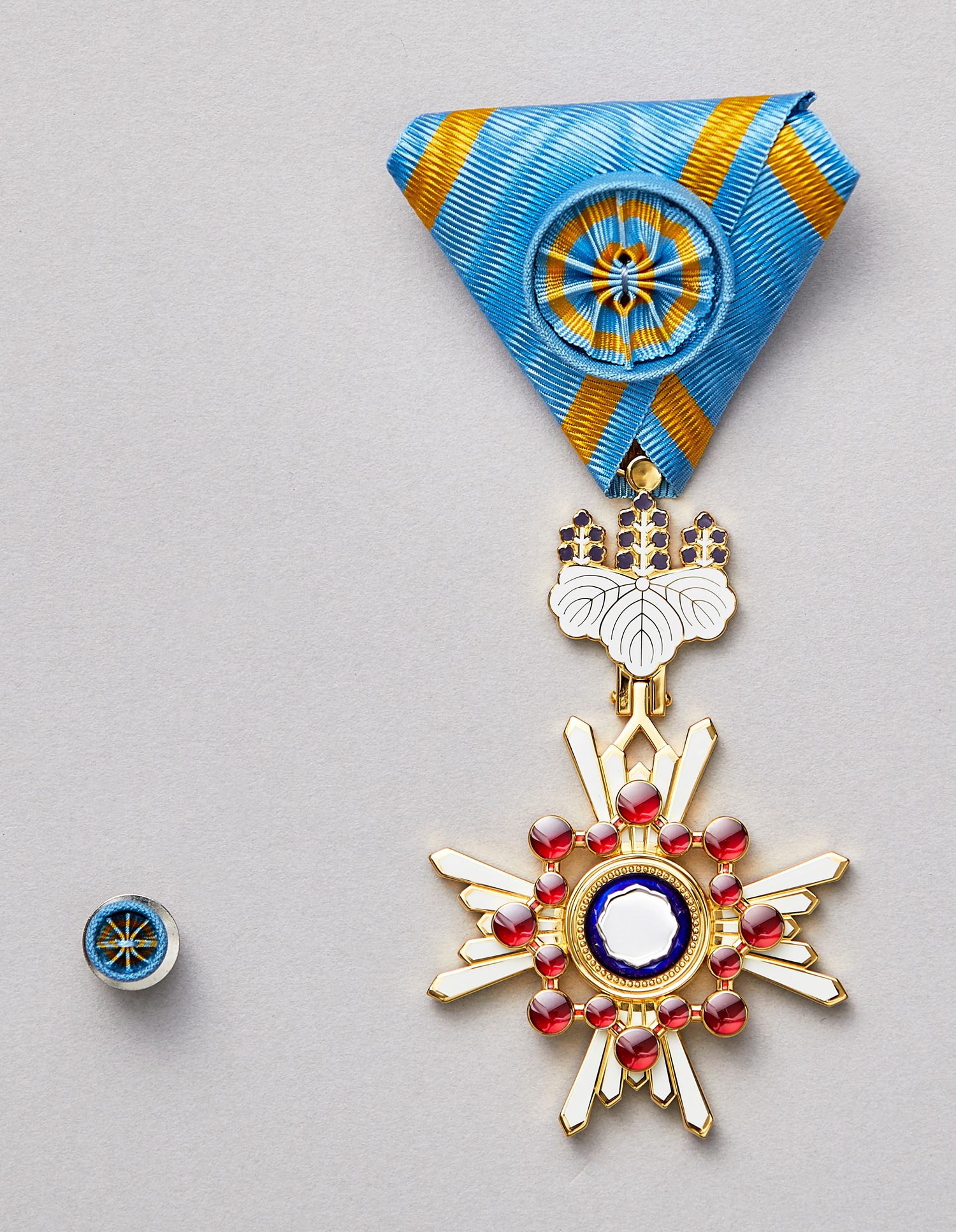
Order of the Sacred Treasure, Gold Rays with Rosette medal and lapel pin

Four Canadians have been decorated by the Emperor of Japan in recognition of their service in improving the status of Japanese-Canadians through a lifelong commitment to the promotion and development of judo in Canada: Shigetaka Sasaki with the Order of the Rising Sun, Silver Rays in 1986, Yoshio Senda with the Order of the Sacred Treasure, Gold and Silver Rays in 1991, Masao Takahashi with the Order of the Sacred Treasure, Gold Rays with Rosette in 2002, and Jim Kojima with the Order of the Rising Sun, Gold Rays with Rosette in 2011.

Raymond Damblant was awarded the International Judo Federation's Silver Medal Award of Merit in 1997.

== Research ==
Judo has been the subject of significant research worldwide, most notably in Japan. It has received less attention in Canada, but is still addressed in both non-academic and academic research across a variety of different disciplines.

=== Popular history ===
Cover of Judoka: The History of Judo in Canada by Gill and Leyshon

Most research on judo in Canada is non-academic popular history that is usually self-published through club and regional association websites, newsletters, and books. The most complete history of Canadian judo is Glynn Leyshon's book Judoka: the History of Judo in Canada, first published in 1998 and then updated in a second edition with Nicolas Gill as co-author in 2019. Leyshon was Professor Emeritus of kinesiology at the University of Western Ontario, but Judoka is an official history commissioned by Judo Canada rather than an academic study. Other examples of popular history include Daniel Nykon and Jim Kojima's The Story of the Steveston Judo Club (2004), Jane Senda's Kyodokan: the Story of the Kyodokan Judo Club and the Founder, Dr. Yoshio Senda (2004), and Carl "Dutchie" Schell's memoir The Origin of Judo in New Brunswick and the Judo Shimpokai (2019).

=== Natural sciences ===
The most widely cited academic publications are journal articles and books written by sports scientists and collaborators from other disciplines. The earliest, "A physiological profile of the Canadian judo team" by A.W. Taylor and L. Brassard, was published in The Journal of Sports Medicine and Physical Fitness in 1981. The similarly titled "Physiological profiles of the Canadian National Judo Team" was published by S.G. Thomas, M.H. Cox, Y.M. LeGal, T.J. Verde, and H.K. Smith in the Canadian Journal of Sport Sciences in 1989. A third article, "Physical performance attributes of junior and senior women, juvenile, junior, and senior men judokas", presents the results of a study of the 1989 Alberta judo team and was published by N.G. Little in The Journal of Sports Medicine and Physical Fitness in 1991. Kinesiologist and judoka Wayland Pulkkinen self-published The Sport Science of Elite Judo Athletes: a Review & Application for Training in 2001.

=== Humanities and social sciences ===
Other scholars have focused on the social aspects of judo. Anne Doré's article "Japanese-Canadian Sport History in the Fraser Valley: Judo and Baseball in the Interwar Years" (2002) and Joseph Svinth's book Getting a Grip: Judo in the Nikkei Communities of the Pacific Northwest, 1900–1950 (2003) both address the history of Judo in British Columbia. Luiz Moraes' PhD thesis in education at the University of Ottawa, Influences on the Development of Beliefs of Canadian Expert Judo Coaches and Their Impact on Action (1998), describes the beliefs of Canadian judo coaches and how these beliefs were represented in their actions during training. And Michelle Rogers' MA thesis in anthropology at the University of Victoria, Twentieth Century Travels: Tales of a Canadian Judoka (2005), examines the life of her father, Olympian Doug Rogers, and uses his story as a case study of how large-scale global processes can influence the life of an individual.

== Popular culture ==
=== Television ===
The most common television coverage of judo in Canada is interviews conducted with Olympic athletes, particularly after a medal has been won, along with short athlete profiles that are interspersed throughout coverage of the Games. One such profile, shown during the 2012 Olympics as part of a CTV series called "The Difference Makers", features Kelita Zupancic, who was training in Japan during the 2011 Tōhoku earthquake and tsunami disaster.

Most of judo's television appearances that are not directly related to the Olympics occurred in the 1950s on either the CBC or its French-language counterpart Radio-Canada, and coincided with the spread of new judo clubs throughout the country following the Second World War. The earliest seems to be an interview at the Ottawa Judo Club, conducted in French by then-journalist René Lévesque and accompanied by a demonstration, in 1955. Another French-language interview and demonstration, this time focusing on the role of women in judo, also aired on Radio-Canada two years later. The first coverage of judo on English television appears to have been in 1956, starting with a demonstration by Fred Okimura and assistants on the Vic Obeck Show, and then in an episode of the information program Tabloid, titled "From foe to friend: Japanese culture in Canada". The episode covers several different elements of Japanese culture, and includes a judo demonstration by Frank Hatashita and his daughter Patsy Yuriko Hatashita. Four other programs (Around Town, Graphic, Hobby Corner, and Spotlight) aired episodes that included judo demonstrations or interviews with judoka from 1957 to 1959. In 1971 the children's show Alphabet Soup ran an episode titled "J is for Judo" which featured journalist and judoka Frank Moritsugu instructing host Mavis Kerr in the basics of judo, and in 1976 The National Film Board of Canada produced a seven-minute 'sport interlude' titled "Capsule – Judo" that was shown on television as part of the coverage leading up to and during the Montreal Olympics.

A 2015 Canadian Tire commercial featured members of Toronto's Ronin Judo Club performing throws on a driveway to demonstrate that the driveway sealer being advertised is dry after 12 hours and does not stain their uniforms.

=== Film ===
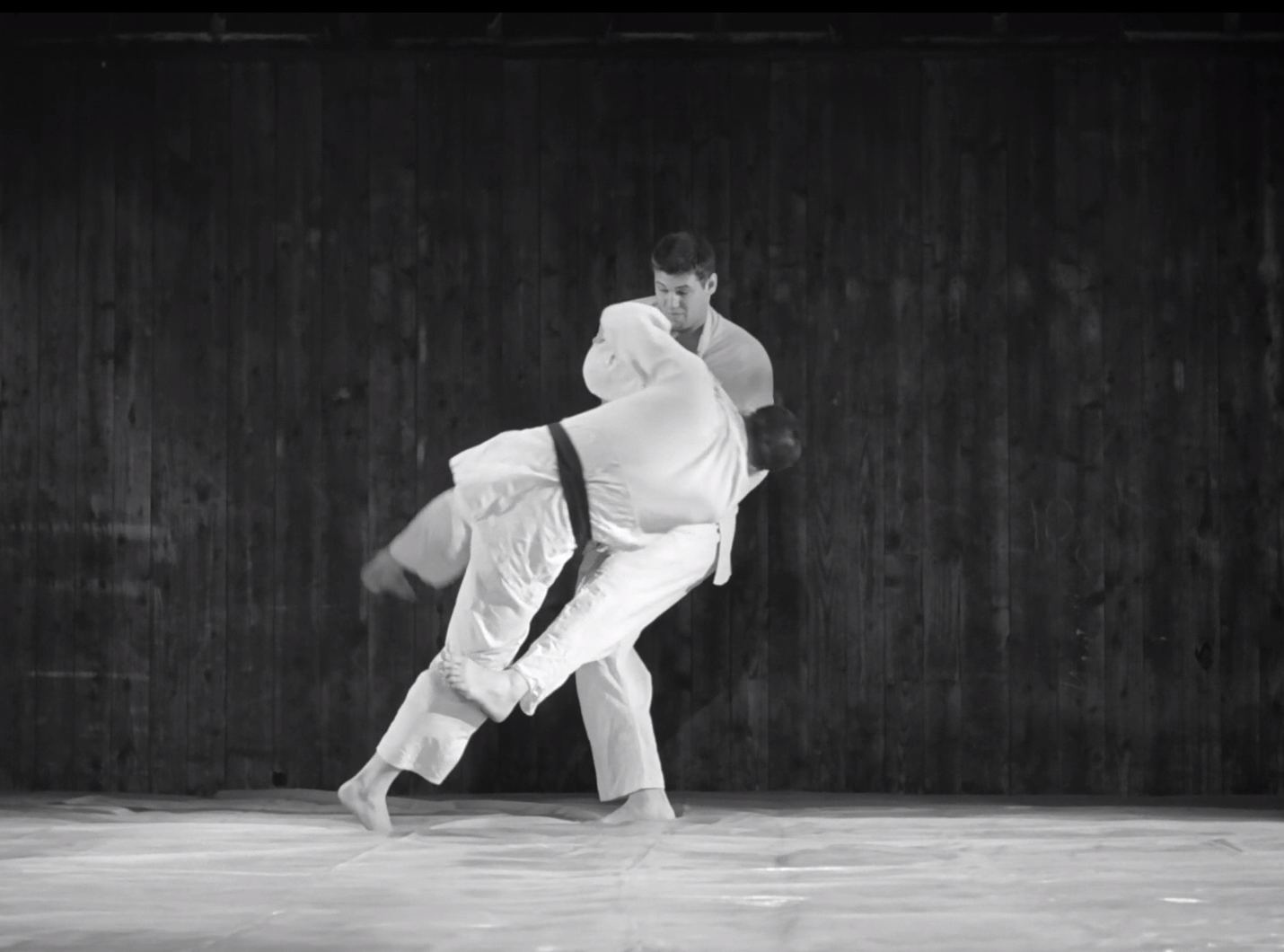
Doug Rogers throwing a training partner in Judoka (1965)

The National Film Board has produced two short documentaries about judo. The first is Judo Jinks (1954), hosted by journalist Fred Davis, which includes a brief history of judo, some demonstrations, and an interview with Bernard Gauthier. The second, Judoka (1965), features Doug Rogers and was filmed after he won silver at the 1964 Olympics in Tokyo. It shows his intensive training under the famous Masahiko Kimura and glimpses of Rogers' life in Japan. Clips of Rogers' silver medal match and the medal ceremony also appear in Kon Ichikawa's celebrated documentary Tokyo Olympiad (1965).

In 2019 the International Judo Federation produced a short film titled Judo for the World – Canada, which focuses on judo in Northern Canada and Montreal. It features Mario Des Forges, Sarah Mazouz, and Antoine Valois-Fortier, among others.

=== Other visual arts ===
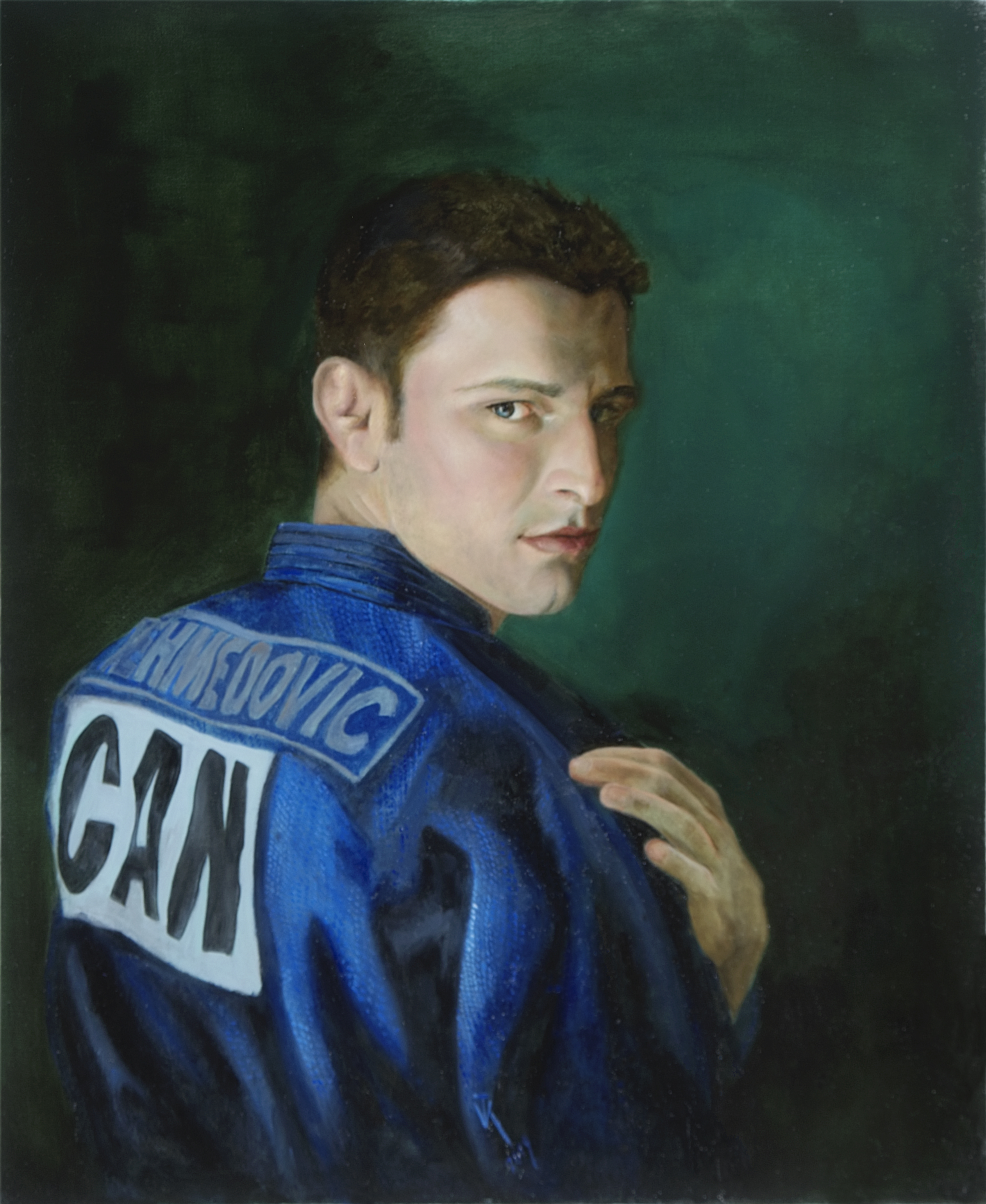
Portrait of Sasha Mehmedovic by Veronica Kvassetskaia-Tsyglan

In 2010 the Portrait Society of Canada held a month-long exhibition at the John B. Aird Gallery in Toronto, titled "Canadian Olympic Athletes: a Dialogue in Art", that featured portraits of Canadian Olympic athletes painted by members of the Society: an oil portrait of Sasha Mehmedovic by Veronica Kvassetskaia-Tsyglan, and an acrylic portrait of Frazer Will by Hon Kong.

=== Podcasts ===
Prominent judoka such as Nicolas Gill have been interviewed and Canadian judo topics (such as the rivalry between Jessica Klimkait and Christa Deguchi) have been discussed on judo-related podcasts, and Judo Canada started its own podcast in 2021.

=== Music ===
Musician Mark Kasprzyk, who previously went by the stage name 'Kazzer' and now goes by 'M. Rivers', was an alternate for Canada's 2000 Olympic Judo team. In the video for his best known song as Kazzer, "Pedal to the Metal" (2002), Kasprzyk stops a bully using the judo throw ippon seoi nage.

=== Postage stamps ===
Canada Post issued a postage stamp that illustrated judo at the 1976 Summer Olympics in Montreal. In 2012, it issued another judo stamp as part of its "Definitives: Canadian Pride" series, this time featuring Nicolas Gill as the flag bearer for the opening ceremony of the 2004 Summer Olympics in Athens.

=== Public figures ===
Former Prime Minister Pierre Elliot Trudeau began practising judo sometime in the mid-1950s when he was in his mid-thirties, and by the end of the decade he was ranked ikkyū (first kyū, brown belt). Later, when he travelled to Japan as Prime Minister, he was promoted to shodan (first dan, black belt) by the Kodokan, and then promoted to nidan (second dan) by Masao Takahashi in Ottawa before leaving office. Trudeau began the night of his famous 'walk in the snow' before announcing his retirement in 1984 by going to judo with his sons, including former Prime Minister Justin Trudeau.

Other Canadian politicians and their families have also been associated with judo. The children of Trudeau's successor in office, Brian Mulroney, also practised at the Takahashi Dojo, and Judo Canada has presented two honorary black belts to Members of Parliament: Minister of Health and Welfare Judy LaMarsh at the Eastern Canada Championships in 1964, and former Prime Minister John Diefenbaker at the Senior Women and Junior National Championships in 1979.

== See also ==
=== General ===
- List of Canadian judoka
- Judo by country

=== Judo by province and territory ===
- Alberta
- British Columbia
- Manitoba
- New Brunswick
- Ontario
- Quebec
- Yukon
