= Leyshon =

Leyshon is a Welsh surname derived from the Welsh masculine given name Lleision. A variant of the surname is Leyson.

Notable people with the surname include:

Leyshon

- Glynn Leyshon, Canadian wrestler and academic
- Nell Leyshon, British playwright and novelist
- Thyrza Anne Leyshon, Welsh artist
- William Leyshon (born 1976), Australian rugby league footballer

Leyson

- Armando Leyson (born 1956), Mexican politician
- Jose Leyson, Filipino lawyer and politician
- Leon Leyson (1929–2013), Polish-American Holocaust survivor and author
- Thomas Leyson (16th century), Welsh poet and physician

== See also ==
- Leyson Séptimo, Dominican baseball player
- Estadio Armando "Kory" Leyson, Mexico
- Mount Leyshon, Queensland, Australia
