= Hiroshi Nakamura (judoka) =

Japanese and Canadian judoka

Personal information
- Born: June 22, 1942 (age 82); Tokyo, Japan
- Occupation: Judoka

Sport
- Country: Canada
- Sport: Judo
- Rank: 9th dan black belt
- Club: Shidokan

Hiroshi Nakamura CM (born 22 June 1942) is a Japanese and Canadian judoka, one of only five Canadian judoka to achieve the rank of Kudan (9th dan), and has been deeply involved in the development of Canadian Judo. He has coached the Olympic judo team five times, was inducted into the Judo Canada Hall of Fame in 1998, was made a Member of the Order of Canada in 2013, and was inducted into the Canadian Olympic Committee Hall of Fame in 2019. In 2023, he was awarded the Order of Sport, marking his induction into Canada's Sports Hall of Fame. Nakamura trains future Olympians at the Shidokan Judo Club, a training club that he opened in 1973.

== See also ==
- Judo in Quebec
- Judo in Canada
- List of Canadian judoka
