= Raymond Damblant =

French and Canadian judoka (1931–2025)

Personal information
- Born: 10 January 1931; France
- Died: 19 July 2025 (aged 94); Montreal, Quebec, Canada
- Occupation: Judoka

Sport
- Country: Canada
- Sport: Judo
- Rank: 9th dan black belt
- Club: Club de judo Hakudokan

Raymond Damblant (French: [ʁɛmɔ̃ dɑ̃blɑ̃]; 10 January 1931 – 19 July 2025) was a French and Canadian judoka, one of only five Canadian judoka to achieve the rank of kudan (ninth dan), and was deeply involved in the development of Canadian Judo, especially in Quebec. He refereed at three Olympics and six World Judo Championships, coached the Canadian judo team on multiple occasions, held multiple positions on Judo Canada's executive committee, served as the founding President of Judo Quebec, and was inducted into the Judo Canada Hall of Fame in 1996.

Damblant was born in France and moved to Canada in 1959 to help promote judo in Quebec on behalf of the French Judo Federation. He had planned to stay for a year but instead settled in Montreal permanently. Damblant founded Club de judo Hakudokan in 1968, and retired as its technical director in 2017.

Damblant died on 19 July 2025, at the age of 94.

== See also ==
- Judo in Quebec
- Judo in Canada
- List of Canadian judoka
