= Judo in Yukon =

- Country: Canada
- Governing body: Judo Yukon; Judo Canada
- National team: Canadian Olympic team

The Japanese martial art judo has been practised in Yukon, Canada since at least 1950.

== History ==
Judo was introduced to Canada in the early twentieth century by Japanese migrants, and the first dojo was established in Vancouver by Shigetaka Sasaki in 1924. It was initially limited to British Columbia, but spread throughout the country following the forced expulsion, internment, and resettlement of Japanese-Canadians after Japan entered the Second World War in 1941.

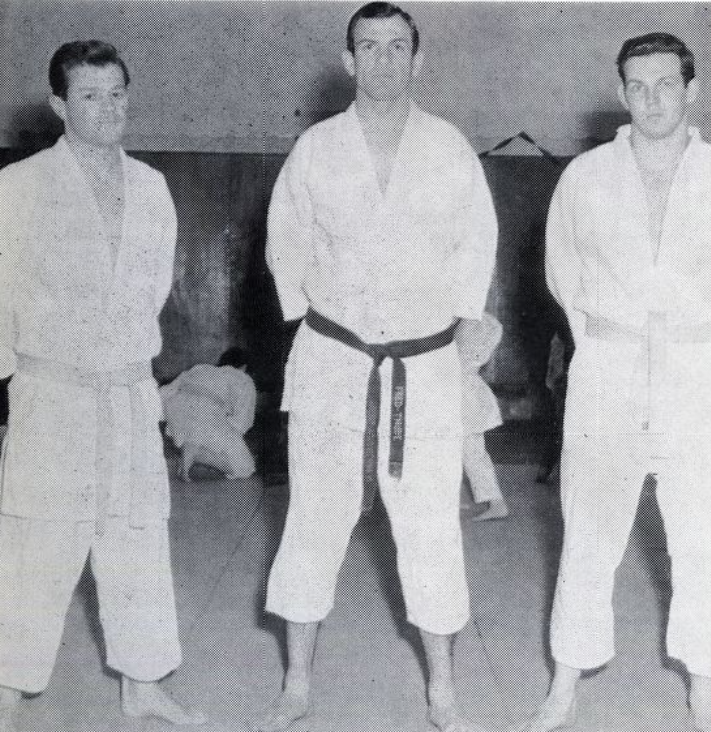
Keno Hill Judo Club instructors Gerd Scholz, Fred Thode, and Roy Hogarth (1969)

It is difficult to determine when judo was first introduced to Yukon, but it was taught to members of the Forest Girl Guards and Junior Forest Wardens as part of their physical education in 1950, and courses were offered at the Whitehorse Gymnasium in 1953. The first dedicated judo club was the Keno Hill Judo Club in Elsa, founded in 1960 by Laurie Wayman, who had earned his nidan (second dan) at the Budokwai in London, England, and received financial support from the Budokwai to purchase mats. It is likely that Wayman was an employee of United Keno Hill Mines Ltd., given that many club members were employees and Wayman's successor as instructor, Fred Thode, was a Project Engineer for the company. At its peak, the club had 100 members.

The Whitehorse Judo Club was established at the Takhini Recreation Centre by Mike Waddell for members of the armed forces who were stationed in the city. By 1961 George Takahashi, a student of Thode, was in charge of the club. Chuck MacKenzie, one of Takahashi's students, founded his own club at the Whitehorse Elementary School in 1964, and went on to be Yukon's most successful judoka: he won the 1963 Yukon Judo Championships in the junior heavyweight division, won two gold ulus at the 1972 Arctic Winter Games, and was the first judoka from the Yukon to compete in the Senior National Championships, with George Peary as his coach. MacKenzie was inducted into the Sport Yukon Hall of Fame in 1982.

The Yukon Kodokan Black Belt Association was established as the judo governing body for the territory in 1974, and was replaced by Judo Yukon in 1996.

== Competition ==
The 1973 Canadian National Judo Championships were held in Whitehorse.

== See also ==
- Judo in Canada
- List of Canadian judoka
