= Glynn Leyshon =

Canadian wrestler and academic (1929–2018)

Personal information
- Nickname: Big Louie
- Born: August 2, 1929 Hamilton, Ontario, Canada
- Died: November 15, 2018 (aged 89) London, Ontario, Canada

Sport
- Country: Canada
- Sport: Wrestling
- Coached by: Earle F. Zeigler

Glynn Arthur Leyshon (2 August 1929 – 15 November 2018) was a Canadian wrestler and university professor who played a significant role in the development of wrestling in Canada. As a wrestler himself, Leyshon won the Ontario–Quebec University Wrestling Championships in 1953 and 1954, but his most noteworthy contributions to wrestling are in organizing and coaching. He organized and established rules for high school wrestling in Ontario, founded the London–Western Wrestling Club, co-founded the Ontario Wrestling Officials Association, founded and served as President of the Canadian Amateur Wrestling Association, and was the Athletic Director of the University of Western Ontario. Leyshon also coached Western's wrestling team from 1964–1980 and the Canadian national wrestling team from 1966–80. He was meant to be 1976 Olympic coach but was unable to accept the role because he could not secure a leave of absence from his university position in time, and was named the 1980 Olympic coach but Canada boycotted the 1980 Olympic Games in protest of the Soviet Union's invasion of Afghanistan. Leyshon is a member of the Western Mustangs Sports Hall of Fame, the London Sports Hall of Fame, and the Canadian Amateur Wrestling Hall of Fame.

== Selected publications ==
- Gill, Nicolas; Leyshon, Glynn (2019). Judoka: The History of Judo in Canada (Second ed.). Montreal: Marcel Broquet. Leyshon was the sole author of the first edition (1998) and died the year before the second edition was published.
- Glynn Leyshon (1984). Of Mats and Men: The Story of Canadian Amateur and Olympic Wrestling from 1600 to 1984. London, Ont.: Sports Dynamics.

== See also ==
- Wrestling in Canada
- Judo in Canada
