= Henri Bernard Gauthier =

Canadian judoka (1926–1987)

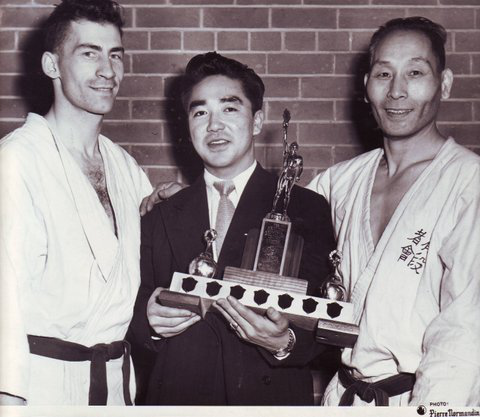
- Left to right: Bernard Gauthier with Masao Takahashi and Shigetaka Sasaki in 1950

Personal information
- Born: January 12, 1926 Hull, Quebec
- Died: August 7, 1987 (aged 61) Val-des-Monts, Quebec

Sport
- Country: Canada
- Sport: Judo
- Rank: Godan (5th dan)
- Updated on 7 September 2012

Henri Bernard Gauthier (12 January 1926 – 7 August 1987) was a judo practitioner involved in the creation of the Pan-American Judo Union. He served as the first president of the Canadian Judo Federation from 1949 until 1960. He introduced the formation of several judo leagues for the expansion of judo throughout the Canada and abroad. He maintained continuous liaison with the International Judo Federation and the affiliated national delegations for the purpose of exchanging on technical and administrative matters.

== Background ==
In 1951, Gauthier represented the interests of Judo at the First Canadian Sports conference held in Ottawa. He served as a member of the executive board of the Canadian Sports council from 1952-54. He held the positions of secretary and treasury for the Canadian Amateur Sports from 1951-55. He was the Canadian delegate to the first International Judo Federation congress in 1956. Mr Gauthier held the position of Vice-President for the PJU in 1952-54.

As a competitor and team captain, he participated in the First Pan American Championship in Havana in 1952. He participated in the Argentina Championship in 1955 and he was the Canadian delegate to the First World Judo Championships in Tokyo in 1956. In the course of his teaching, several of his students achieved national competition ranking.

Gauthier taught judo and self-defense techniques to members of the Royal Canadian Mounted Police, the military police, The Royal Canadian Air Force, the Salvation Army, the municipal police forces, the University of Ottawa Physical Education Department, the Prison and Penitentiary guards and at private civilian dojos in Canada and the United States. Gauthier was also founder of the first known Judo club in Canada catering to the blind.

In 1965, Gauthier made three judo and self-defense films in collaboration with the National Film Board and the Canadian Penitentiary authorities. He designed and maintained several Judo newsletters and Pan-Canadian bulletins for several years. He also organized and participated in over 200 public demonstrations, tournaments and championships towards the emancipation of Judo in Canada. The National Film Board of Canada produced a video clip of his achievements in 1954 under the title: Judo Jinks.

== Awards and honors ==
In 1954, he was awarded the Gil-O Julien trophy for the best French-Canadian athlete in Ontario-Québec. Judo-Québec made him a member of its Hall of Fame as a pioneer in 1990. In June 2007, he was posthumously inducted into the Pan-American Judo Union Hall of Fame.

== Publications ==
- Gauthier, Bernard (1952). Canadian and American Modern Judo. Hull, Quebec: Canadian Judo Information Centre.

== See also ==
- Judo in Quebec
- Judo in Canada
- List of Canadian judoka
