= Carl Schell =

Canadian judoka (1924–2020)

Personal information
- Nickname(s): Dutchie, Mr. Judo
- Born: 2 December 1924; Saint John, New Brunswick
- Died: 28 February 2020 (aged 95); Saint John, New Brunswick
- Occupation: Judoka

Sport
- Country: Canada
- Sport: Judo
- Rank: 6th dan black belt
- Club: Saint John YMCA; Shimpokai Judo Club

Carl "Dutchie" Schell (2 December 1924 – 28 February 2020) was a Canadian judoka who played a significant role in the development of judo in Canada, especially New Brunswick. Schell established the first judo club in New Brunswick at the Saint John YMCA in 1958, then co-founded the Shimpokai Judo Club with Harry Thomas, John Crawford, Doug Kearns, and Ken Meeting in Saint John in 1959. He also founded the New Brunswick Kodokan Black Belt Association in 1961, served as its President and in other executive roles, served as Atlantic vice-president of Judo Canada, and coached the New Brunswick judo team. Schell was inducted into the Saint John Sports Hall of Fame in 2000, the Judo Canada Hall of Fame in 2003, and the New Brunswick Sports Hall of Fame in 2007.

== Publications ==
- Carl "Dutchie" Schell (2019). The Origin of Judo in New Brunswick and the Judo Shimpokai: A Judo Memoir. Long Books.

== See also ==
- Judo in New Brunswick
- Judo in Canada
- List of Canadian judoka
