= Mario Des Forges =

Canadian judoka (born 1965)

Personal information
- Birth name: Mario Des Forges
- Full name: Mario Des Forges
- Nationality: Canadian
- Born: 1965 (age 59–60); Montreal, Quebec

Sport
- Country: Canada
- Sport: Judo

Mario Des Forges (born 1965) is a Canadian judoka who has played a significant role in the development of judo in Canada's territories, especially Nunavut and the Northwest Territories. He founded the Nunavut Judo Association in 2001 and the Northwest Territories Judo Association in 2008, was President of the Northwest Territories Judo Association and Director of the Aboriginal and Territorial Affairs Committee of Judo Canada, and was prominently featured in the International Judo Federation's short film Judo for the World – Canada (2019). Des Forges won Judo Quebec's Educator of the Year award in 2005, was awarded the Queen Elizabeth II Diamond Jubilee Medal by the Canadian Olympic Committee in 2012, and was named Coach of the Year by the Sport North Federation in 2015. He is also the co-author of a French-language novel for young adults about judo titled Chutes (2013).

== Publications ==
- Jaillet, Maxence; Des Forges, Mario (2013). Chutes (in French). Montreal: Carte blanche.

== Interviews ==
- Servel, Nicolas (12 December 2016). "On parle judo avec Mario Desforges". Radio Taïga (in French).

== See also ==
- Judo in Canada
- List of Canadian judoka
