= Nicolas Gill =

Canadian judoka (born 1972)

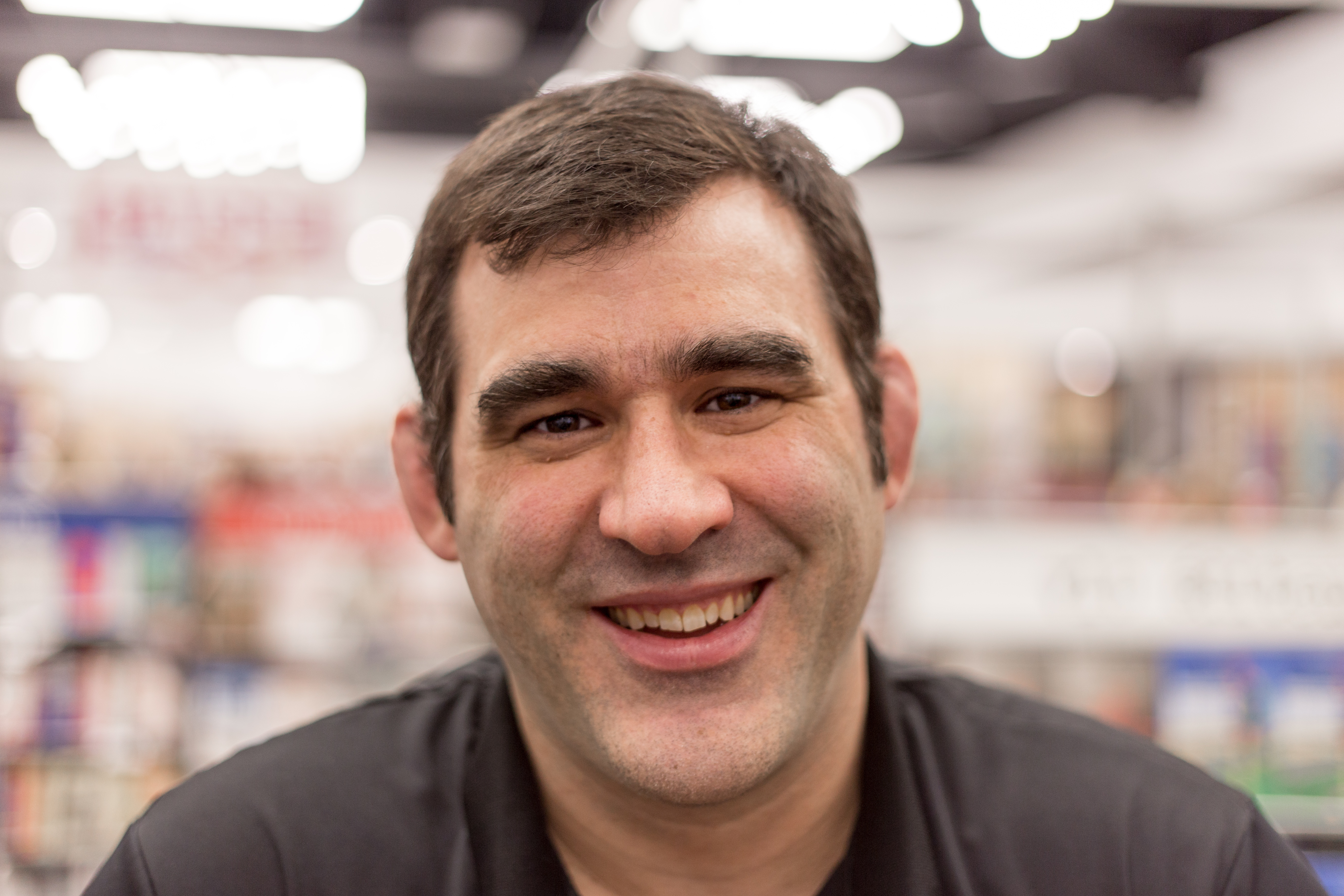
- Gill in 2018

Personal information
- Born: 24 April 1972 (age 54) Montreal, Quebec
- Occupation: Judoka
- Height: 1.85 m (6 ft 1 in)
- Weight: 105 kg (231 lb) (2004)

Sport
- Country: Canada
- Sport: Judo
- Weight class: –86 kg, –100 kg
- Rank: 7th dan black belt
- Club: Shidokan
- Coached by: Hiroshi Nakamura
- Now coaching: Antoine Valois-Fortier

Achievements and titles
- Olympic Games: (silver) (2000)
- World Champ.: (silver) (1993)
- Pan American Champ.: (1990, 1998, 2002)
- Commonwealth Games: (silver) (2002)
Medal record
Men's judo
Representing Canada
Olympic Games
Silver medal – second place	2000 Sydney	‍–‍100 kg
Bronze medal – third place	1992 Barcelona	‍–‍86 kg
World Championships
Silver medal – second place	1993 Hamilton	‍–‍86 kg
Bronze medal – third place	1995 Chiba	‍–‍86 kg
Bronze medal – third place	1999 Birmingham	‍–‍100 kg
Pan American Games
Gold medal – first place	1995 Mara del Plata	‍–‍86 kg
Gold medal – first place	1999 Winnipeg	‍–‍100 kg
Silver medal – second place	2003 Santo Domingo	‍–‍100 kg
Pan American Championships
Gold medal – first place	1990 Caracas	‍–‍86 kg
Gold medal – first place	1998 Santo Domingo	‍–‍100 kg
Gold medal – first place	2002 Santo Domingo	‍–‍100 kg
Silver medal – second place	1994 Santiago	‍–‍86 kg
World Juniors Championships
Silver medal – second place	1992 Buenos Aires	‍–‍86 kg
Commonwealth Games
Gold medal – first place	2002 Manchester	‍–‍100 kg
Jeux de la Francophonie
Gold medal – first place	2001 Gatineau	‍–‍100 kg

Profile at external databases
- IJF: 132
- JudoInside.com: 801
- Updated on 31 May 2023

Nicolas Gill (born 24 April 1972 in Montreal, Quebec) is a Canadian judoka who competed at four consecutive Olympic Games. He is a two-time Olympic medalist, receiving a bronze in the middleweight (86 kg) division at his inaugural Olympiad in Barcelona. He received a silver medal in the men's half-heavyweight (100 kg) division at the 2000 Sydney Summer Olympics.

Gill was honored by his teammates as Canada's flag bearer in the opening ceremony at the 2004 Summer Olympics in Athens. A mild controversy developed after it was revealed that Gill had made comments in favour of Quebec separatism, and had voted 'yes' in the 1995 Quebec referendum. Gill went on the lose his opening match which eliminated him from the tournament.

In 2007, he received the prix reconnaissance from UQAM as a TÉLUQ student.

He has since become a coach; one of his athletes, Antoine Valois-Fortier, won a bronze medal at the 2012 London Summer Olympics.

Nicolas Gill is an Order of Sport recipient and was inducted into Canada's Sports Hall of Fame in 2015.

== See also ==
- Judo in Quebec
- Judo in Canada
- List of Canadian judoka
