= Judo in New Brunswick =

- Country: Canada
- Governing body: Judo New Brunswick; Judo Canada
- National team: Canadian Olympic team

The Japanese martial art and combat sport judo has been practised in the Canadian province of New Brunswick since 1955.

== History ==
Judo was introduced to Canada in the early twentieth century by Japanese migrants, and was limited to British Columbia until the forced expulsion, internment, and resettlement of Japanese-Canadians after Japan entered the Second World War in 1941. Japanese Canadian expulsion and internment was pivotal in the development of Canadian judo because it forced judoka to settle in other parts of the country. Some returned to the Pacific coast after 1949, but most found new homes in other provinces. New dojos opened in the Prairies, Ontario, and Quebec, primarily in the mid-to-late 1940s, and the centre of Canadian judo shifted from Vancouver to Toronto, where a significant number of judoka had settled after the war. The pattern is different in Atlantic Canada and Northern Canada, where judo was typically introduced 5–10 years later and migrants from Europe played a more significant role. Many early dojos were housed at the local branch of the YMCA, which also provided short-term accommodation, assisted with finding employment, and coordinated social programs for resettled Japanese Canadians. Clubs at military bases, RCMP barracks, and universities were also common.

Judo was first introduced to New Brunswick in 1955 by two sankyu (third kyū, green belt) German immigrants, Heinz Wazel and George Taenzer, who moved to Saint John and began practicing judo at the local YMCA. This attracted the attention of some of the other YMCA members, including Carl "Dutchie" Schell, and a small group referred to as both the Saint John Judo Club and the YMCA Judo Club was formed in January 1956. Wazel and Taenzer, who had been taught by Peter Neufeld in Germany, served as the instructors. At the Club's request, Frank Hatashita sent Vern Fagan to Saint John to instruct for almost a month in March 1956, and its members began making trips to Toronto to learn more at Hatashita's dojo. The Club also received guest instruction from Jon Bluming, a Dutch martial artist who was teaching judo in Halifax, Nova Scotia in 1958, and another dojo was established in Fredericton by RCMP Sergeant Melrose around the same time. In 1959 Schell, Harry Thomas, John Crawford, Ken Meating, and Doug Kearns left the YMCA Judo Club amicably to establish the Judo Shimpokai (named by Gunji Koizumi in collaboration with E.J. Harrison, the club's honorary president) at 15 Sydney Street, Saint John.

== See also ==
- Judo in Canada
- List of Canadian judoka
