= Veronica Kvassetskaia-Tsyglan =

Canadian artist

Veronica Kvassetskaia-Tsyglan (Kva-set–sky-ya – t-see-g-lan) (born December 28, 1966) is a Canadian classical realist painter specializing in the Old Masters' technique. She is active in the contemporary revival of the classical tradition of fine art portraiture in Canada. She founded the Portrait Society of Canada in 2001 in Toronto, Canada, and is the current chairman.

== Life ==
Kvassetskaia was born on December 28, 1966, in Moscow to Russian mother Taisia Levicheva and Polish father Vladimir Kvassetski. She has an older sister named Olga. Kvassetskaia-Tsyglan began displaying talent and an affection for the arts at an early age—playing the violin, singing, sculpting and drawing. Later on, she developed an interest in analytical chemistry, science and psychology. From a young age, Kvassetskaia knew that she wanted to be an artist and as a teenager she began reproducing works of the Old Masters. She became a pupil of the Soviet Ossetian artist Lolita Gally. She studied Fine Art at the V. Surikov State Academy Art Institute, then Art History at the Moscow State University.

She emigrated from Russia in 1991.

Kvassetskaia-Tsyglan studied in Frankfurt, Germany while working in the field of restoration. She reproduced Old Masters' works in Alte Pinakothek, the Louvre, and then in Larnaca, Cyprus where she studied Greek Orthodox iconography at the Agia Moni Monastery workshop. In 1996, she moved to Toronto, Canada, where she lives and paints at her studio in Willowdale.

== Work ==
Kvassetskaia-Tsyglan is a realist painter specializing in classical portraiture. She follows in the style of the Old Masters, such as Michelangelo and Leonardo da Vinci.

Kvassetskaia-Tsyglan has researched her craft, its history and techniques. Her central focus has been uncovering, understanding and reproducing the secrets of the Old Masters.

Her portraits have been exhibited in museums and private and corporate collections internationally. Her works can be found in the collections of former Canadian Finance Minister Jim Flaherty and the 28th Lieutenant Governor of Ontario, The Hon. David Onley, the Countess Von Wedel, Sonja Bata Museum and St. Marks Coptic Museum.

She has received portrait commissions from Vladislav Tretiak, Measha Brueggergosman, Ekaterina Gubanova, Dmitri Hvorostovsky, Lee Carroll, Larysa Kuzmenko, Tom Diamond, Simon Whitfield, Jessica Zelinka, Claire Hopkinson, Brahm Goldhamer, Patricia Bezzoubenko, Murray Pollitt and a historical portrait of Grand Duchess Anastasia Nikolaevna of Russia.

== Awards and recognition ==
- 2002 First Place Award, International Portrait Competition, Jackman Hall, AGO, PSC
- 2002 Peoples’ Choice Award, International Portrait Competition, Jackman Hall, AGO, PSC
- 2003 Elizabeth Greenshield Foundation Award Grant, Canada
- 2004 Certificate of Excellence in Fine Art Portraiture, PSC, Canada
- 2013 International Contemporary Artist catalogue, Volume XVIII, USA
- 2014 International Contemporary Artist, Volume X, USA,
- 2002–Present, Professional Member of the Arts and Letters Club of Toronto

== Appearances in media ==
- 2009 Featured On Bravo (Canada) in “Star Portraits, episode 3, Measha Brueggergossman”(TV Series). PTV Productions. Canada
- 2014 “Creating life on Canvas” - Biographical Documentary by M. Petrenko Productions

== Gallery exhibitions ==
- Gallery 7, Yorkville, Toronto
- Grimsby Public Art Gallery, Grimsby, ON
- Art Student league, New York, NY
- Frederick Horsman Varley Art Gallery, Unionville, ON
- Imaginart Gallery, Toronto, ON
- Heliconian Club, Toronto, ON
- Toronto Centre for the Arts Gallery, Toronto, ON
- John B. Aird Gallery, Toronto, ON
- St Marks Coptic Museum, Iconography Exhibition, Toronto, ON
- Bohemiarte Gallery, Montreal, QC
- The Arts and Letters Club of Toronto, ON
