= Judo in Quebec =

- Country: Canada
- Governing body: Judo Quebec; Judo Canada
- National team: Canadian Olympic team

The Japanese martial art and combat sport judo has been practised in the Canadian province of Quebec since 1946.

== History ==
Judo was introduced to Canada in the early twentieth century by Japanese migrants, and was limited to British Columbia until the forced expulsion, internment, and resettlement of Japanese-Canadians after Japan entered the Second World War in 1941. Japanese Canadian expulsion and internment was pivotal in the development of Canadian judo because it forced judoka to settle in other parts of the country. Some returned to the Pacific coast after 1949, but most found new homes in other provinces. New dojos opened in the Prairies, Ontario, and Quebec, primarily in the mid-to-late 1940s, and the centre of Canadian judo shifted from Vancouver to Toronto, where a significant number of judoka had settled after the war. Many early dojos were housed at the local branch of the YMCA, which also provided short-term accommodation, assisted with finding employment, and coordinated social programs for resettled Japanese Canadians. Clubs at military bases, RCMP barracks, and universities were also common.

Hideo "Harold" Tokairin and Yutaka "Fred" Okimura moved from British Columbia to Montreal after the war and started the YMCA Judo Club in 1946. Okimura also established the McGill University Judo Club at the request of the Department of Athletics in 1950, making it the first organized university judo club in Canada. In 1952 Kametaro Akiyama, Okimura, and Tokairin opened the Seidokwan Academy of Judo on Rachel Street in a recreation centre un by the local Catholic parish. It was the first long-term community dojo in Montreal, was sponsored by many of the city's Japanese Canadians, and provided most of the instructors for the McGill club. Seidokwan changed locations several times over the years, but did not close its doors permanently until 2019. French judoka Marc Scala operated several dojos in Montreal in the early 1950s; the one located at 1423 Drummond Street went by the names "Canadian Academy of Judo" in 1953 and "North American Academy of Judo" in 1954, and was likely associated with the Downtown YMCA, which is directly adjacent to this address. Outside of Montreal, Bernard Gauthier began teaching judo and jujitsu in Gatineau and the surrounding area in the late 1940s, and established the Kano Judo Club in Hull in or c. 1947. He also taught judo across the river in Ottawa, Ontario at the YMCA, the University of Ottawa, and Carleton University.

The number or judo clubs increased significantly during the 1960s, in large part due to Raymond Damblant who played a role similar to Shigetaka Sasaki in British Columbia during the pre-war period. Damblant moved from France to Montreal in 1959 to help promote judo in the province on behalf of the French Judo Federation. He began travelling around Quebec's regions to provide instruction and help organize local judo associations, and he consolidated the provincial administration of judo by reorganizing the Quebec Kodokan Judo Black Belt Association in 1966 and serving as its first President. When Damblant first arrived in Quebec there were only 10 dojos, and he is credited with spearheading the infrastructure that led to about 120 clubs and 10,000 judoka in Quebec today.

== See also ==
- Judo in Canada
- List of Canadian judoka
