= List of Pan American Games medalists in judo =

This is the complete list of Pan American Games medalists in judo from 1963 to 2023.

== Men's events ==
=== Flyweight ===
- 56 kg

Year	Gold	Silver	Bronze	
1991	Luis Martínez (PUR)	Clifton Sunada (USA)	Willis García (VEN)	Sumio Tsujimoto (BRA)
1995	Ismady Alonso (CUB)	Luis Vizcaíno (DOM)	Jacob Flores (USA)	Rodolfo Yamayose (BRA)

=== Extra Lightweight ===
- 60 kg

Year	Gold	Silver	Bronze	
1979	Luis Shinohara (BRA)	Edward Liddie (USA)	Rafael González (MEX)	Phil Takahashi (CAN)
1983	Rafael Rodríguez (CUB)	Luis Shinohara (BRA)	Rafael González (MEX)	Phil Takahashi (CAN)
1987	Sérgio Pessoa (BRA)	Kevin Asano (USA)	Jorge di Noco (ARG)	Rafael Rodríguez (CUB)
1991	Shigueto Yamasaki (BRA)	Ewan Beaton (CAN)	Israel Hernández (CUB)	Edward Liddie (USA)
1995	Ewan Beaton (CAN)	Manolo Poulot (CUB)	Carlos Bortole (BRA)	Jorge Lencina (ARG)
1999	Manolo Poulot (CUB)	Denílson Lourenço (BRA)	Juan Jacinto (DOM)	Jorge Lencina (ARG)
2003	Angelo Gómez (CUB)	Modesto Lara (DOM)	Miguel Albarracín (ARG)	Reiver Alvarenga (VEN)
2007	Miguel Albarracín (ARG)	Yosmani Piker (CUB)	Alexandre Lee (BRA)	Javier Guédez (VEN)
2011	Felipe Kitadai (BRA)	Nabor Castillo (MEX)	Juan Postigos (PER)	Aaron Kunihiro (USA)
2015	Lenin Preciado (ECU)	Felipe Kitadai (BRA)	John Futtinico (COL)	Yandry Torres (CUB)
2019	Renan Torres (BRA)	Lenin Preciado (ECU)	Roberto Almenares (CUB)	Adonis Diaz (USA)
2023	Michel Augusto (BRA)	Johan Rojas (COL)	Arath Juárez (MEX)	Juan Ayala (ECU)

=== Half Lightweight ===
- 63 kg (1967–1975)
- 65 kg (1979–1995)
- 66 kg (1999–)

Year	Gold	Silver	Bronze	
1967	Akira Ono (BRA)	Patrick Bolger (CAN)	Larry Fukuhara (USA)	Luis Teodoro Gastón (CUB)
1975	Brad Farrow (CAN)	Héctor Rodríguez (CUB)	Manuel Luna (VEN)	Luis Shinohara (BRA)
1979	Brad Farrow (CAN)	Luís Onmura (BRA)	Gerardo Padilla (MEX)	Héctor Rodríguez (CUB)
1983	Gerardo Padilla (MEX)	Jimmy Martin (USA)	Brad Farrow (CAN)	Ricardo Tuero (CUB)
1987	Ismael Borbona (ARG)	Nelson Onmura (BRA)	Eduardo Landazury (COL)	Víctor Rivera (PUR)
1991	Francisco Morales (ARG)	Jean Pierre Cantin (CAN)	Pablo Hernández (CUB)	Jimmy Pedro (USA)
1995	Israel Hernández (CUB)	Francisco Morales (ARG)	Henrique Guimarães (BRA)	Taro Tan (CAN)
1999	Martin Ríos (ARG)	Ludwig Ortíz (VEN)	Yordanis Arencibia (CUB)	Alex Ottiano (USA)
2003	Yordanis Arencibia (CUB)	Ludwig Ortíz (VEN)	Henrique Guimarães (BRA)	Alex Ottiano (USA)
2007	João Derly (BRA)	Roberto Ibáñez (ECU)	Yordanis Arencibia (CUB)	Ludwig Ortíz (VEN)
2011	Leandro Cunha (BRA)	Kenny Hashimoto (USA)	Anyelo Gomez (CUB)	Ricardo Valderrama (VEN)
2015	Charles Chibana (BRA)	Antoine Bouchard (CAN)	Carlos Tondique (CUB)	Fernando González (ARG)
2019	Wander Mateo (DOM)	Daniel Cargnin (BRA)	Osniel Solís (CUB)	Ricardo Valderrama (VEN)
2023	Willis García (VEN)	Julien Frascadore (CAN)	Orlando Polanco (CUB)	Willian Lima (BRA)

=== Lightweight ===
- 70 kg (1963–1975)
- 71 kg (1979–1995)
- 73 kg (1999–)

Year	Gold	Silver	Bronze	
1963	Toshiyuki Seino (USA)	Jorge Yamashita (BRA)	—	—
1967	Takeshi Miura (BRA)	Toshiyuki Seino (USA)	René Arredondo (MEX)	Ibrahim Torres (CUB)
1975	Wayne Erdman (CAN)	Roberto Machusso (BRA)	Patrick Burris (USA)	Oscar Strático (ARG)
1979	Guillermo d'Nelson (CUB)	Kevin Doherty (CAN)	Roberto Machusso (BRA)	Andrés Puentes (MEX)
1983	Guillermo d'Nelson (CUB)	Luís Onmura (BRA)	Omar Abdala (ARG)	Mike Swain (USA)
1987	Mike Swain (USA)	Luís Onmura (BRA)	Rómulo Alvarez (VEN)	Ignacio Sayu (CUB)
1991	Mario González (MEX)	Sérgio Oliveira (BRA)	Dan Hatano (USA)	Ismael Borbona (CUB)
1995	Jimmy Pedro (USA)	Erick de la Paz (CUB)	Jean Pierre Cantin (CAN)	Sérgio Oliveira (BRA)
1999	Jimmy Pedro (USA)	Carlos Méndez (PUR)	Israel Hernández (CUB)	Sebastian Pereira (BRA)
2003	Luiz Camilo Jr. (BRA)	Rubert Martínez (CUB)	Ernst Laraque (HAI)	Jean-François Marceau (CAN)
2007	Ryan Reser (USA)	Leandro Guilheiro (BRA)	Ronald Girones (CUB)	Nicholas Tritton (CAN)
2011	Bruno Mendonça (BRA)	Alejandro Clara (ARG)	Ronald Girones (CUB)	Nicholas Tritton (CAN)
2015	Magdiel Estrada (CUB)	Alejandro Clara (ARG)	Augusto Miranda (PUR)	Arthur Margelidon (CAN)
2019	Magdiel Estrada (CUB)	Alonso Wong (PER)	Jeferson Santos Junior (BRA)	Nicholas Delpopolo (USA)
2023	Gabriel Falcão (BRA)	Daniel Cargnin (BRA)	Antoine Bouchard (CAN)	Gilberto Cardoso (MEX)

=== Half Middleweight ===
- 78 kg (1979–1995)
- 81 kg (1999–)

Year	Gold	Silver	Bronze	
1979	Carlos Alberto Cunha (BRA)	Radamés Lora (DOM)	Brett Barron (USA)	Juan Ferrer (CUB)
1983	Brett Barron (USA)	Juan Ferrer (CUB)	Carlos Huttich (MEX)	José Strático (ARG)
1987	Jason Morris (USA)	Carlos Huttich (MEX)	Andrés Franco (CUB)	Kilmar Campos (VEN)
1991	Jason Morris (USA)	Armando Maldonado (CUB)	Renato Dagnino (BRA)	Gastón García (ARG)
1995	Gastón García (ARG)	Jason Morris (USA)	Flávio Canto (BRA)	Colin Morgan (CAN)
1999	Gabriel Arteaga (CUB)	Flávio Canto (BRA)	Maxime Roberge (CAN)	Gastón García (ARG)
2003	Flávio Canto (BRA)	Gabriel Arteaga (CUB)	Mario Valles (COL)	Ariel Sganga (ARG)
2007	Travis Stevens (USA)	Mario Valles (COL)	Oscar Cárdenas (CUB)	Franklin Cisneros (ESA)
2011	Leandro Guilheiro (BRA)	Gadiel Miranda (PUR)	Antoine Valois-Fortier (CAN)	Emmanuel Lucenti (ARG)
2015	Travis Stevens (USA)	Iván Felipe Silva (CUB)	Pedro Castro (COL)	Victor Penalber (BRA)
2019	Eduardo Yudy Santos (BRA)	Medickson del Orbe (DOM)	Adrián Gandía (PUR)	Jorge Martínez (CUB)
2023	Guilherme Schimidt (BRA)	Jorge Pérez (CHI)	David Popovici (CAN)	Medickson del Orbe (DOM)

=== Middleweight ===
- 80 kg (1963–1975)
- 86 kg (1979–1995)
- 90 kg (1999–)

Year	Gold	Silver	Bronze	
1963	Lhofei Shiozawa (BRA)	Paul Maruyama (USA)	Rómulo Etcheverry (URU)	—
1967	Hayward Nishioka (USA)	Lhofei Shiozawa (BRA)	Gordon Buttle (CAN)	Gabriel Goldschmied (MEX)
1975	Rainer Fischer (CAN)	Carlos Eduardo Motta (BRA)	Steve Cohen (USA)	Rafael Kidd (DOM)
1979	Louis Jani (CAN)	Alexis Mundo (VEN)	Eduardo Novoa (CHI)	Leo White (USA)
1983	Louis Jani (CAN)	Robert Berland (USA)	Walter Carmona (BRA)	Alejandro Strático (ARG)
1987	Rinaldo Caggiano (BRA)	Charles Griffith (VEN)	José González (CUB)	William Medina (COL)
1991	Joseph Wanag (USA)	José Vera (DOM)	Andrés Franco (CUB)	Hermate Souffrant (HAI)
1995	Nicolas Gill (CAN)	Carlos Hespanha (BRA)	Pablo Elisii (ARG)	Brian Olson (USA)
1999	Brian Olson (USA)	Eduardo Costa (ARG)	Yosvany Despaigne (CUB)	Keith Morgan (CAN)
2003	Brian Olson (USA)	Keith Morgan (CAN)	Yosvany Despaigne (CUB)	Carlos Honorato (BRA)
2007	Tiago Camilo (BRA)	Jorge Benavides (CUB)	José Camacho (VEN)	Rick Hawn (USA)
2011	Tiago Camilo (BRA)	Asley González (CUB)	Alexandre Émond (CAN)	Isao Cardenas (MEX)
2015	Tiago Camilo (BRA)	Asley González (CUB)	Jacob Larsen (USA)	Isao Cárdenas (MEX)
2019	Iván Felipe Silva (CUB)	Francisco Balanta (COL)	Mohab Elnahas (CAN)	Yuta Galarreta (PER)
2023	Iván Felipe Silva (CUB)	Rafael Macedo (BRA)	Alexander Knauf (USA)	Robert Florentino (DOM)

=== Half Heavyweight ===
- 93 kg (1967–1975)
- 95 kg (1979–1995)
- 100 kg (1999–)

Year	Gold	Silver	Bronze	
1967	Michael Johnson (CAN)	Rodolfo Pérez (ARG)	William Paul (USA)	Rolando Sánchez (CUB)
1975	Ricardo Campos (BRA)	Irwin Cohen (USA)	Chris Preobrazenski (CAN)	Roberto Batista (CUB)
1979	Carlos Pacheco (BRA)	Venancio Gómez (CUB)	Sergio Komornickie (ARG)	Miguel Tudela (USA)
1983	Isaac Azcuy (CUB)	Aurélio Miguel (BRA)	Fabián Lannutti (ARG)	Leo White (USA)
1987	Aurélio Miguel (BRA)	Joe Meli (USA)	Belarmino Salgado (CUB)	Leo White (USA)
1991	Belarmino Salgado (CUB)	Leo White (USA)	Jorge Aguirre (ARG)	Charles Griffith (VEN)
1995	Keith Morgan (CAN)	Daniel dell'Aquila (BRA)	Belarmino Salgado (CUB)	Rafael Hueso (USA)
1999	Nicolas Gill (CAN)	Yosvani Kessel (CUB)	Marcelo Figueiredo (BRA)	Ato Hand (USA)
2003	Mário Sabino (BRA)	Nicolas Gill (CAN)	Oreidis Despaigne (CUB)	Michael Barnes (USA)
2007	Oreidis Despaigne (CUB)	Keith Morgan (CAN)	Luciano Corrêa (BRA)	Teófilo Diek (DOM)
2011	Luciano Corrêa (BRA)	Oreidis Despaigne (CUB)	Cristian Schmidt (ARG)	Sergio García (MEX)
2015	Luciano Corrêa (BRA)	Marc Deschenes (CAN)	Héctor Campos (ARG)	José Armenteros (CUB)
2019	Thomas Briceño (CHI)	L.A. Smith III (USA)	Lewis Medina (DOM)	Junior Angulo (ECU)
2023	Shady Elnahas (CAN)	Thomas Briceño (CHI)	Francisco Balanta (COL)	Kayo Santos (BRA)

=== Heavyweight ===
- 90 kg (1963)
- +93 kg (1967–1975)
- +95 kg (1979–1995)
- +100 kg (1999–)

Year	Gold	Silver	Bronze	
1963	George Harris (USA)	Milton Lovato (BRA)	Heraldo Viazzi (URU)	—
1967	Allen Coage (USA)	Douglas Rogers (CAN)	Euladio Nicolaas (AHO)	José Luis Turletto (ARG)
1975	Allen Coage (USA)	José Ibañez (CUB)	Juan Santos (PUR)	Femelo da Silva (BRA)
1979	José Ibañez (CUB)	Jesse Goldstein (USA)	Jaime Felipa (AHO)	Oswaldo Simões (BRA)
1983	Mark Berger (CAN)	Frederico Flexa (BRA)	Jorge Fis (CUB)	Douglas Nelson (USA)
1987	Frank Moreno (CUB)	Frederico Flexa (BRA)	Fred Blaney (CAN)	Douglas Nelson (USA)
1991	Frank Moreno (CUB)	Orlando Baccino (ARG)	Frederico Flexa (BRA)	James Bacon (USA)
1995	José Mario Tranquillini (BRA)	Frank Moreno (CUB)	Orlando Baccino (ARG)	Damon Keeve (USA)
1999	Ángel Sánchez (CUB)	Daniel Hernandes (BRA)	Orlando Baccino (ARG)	Douglas Cardozo (VEN)
2003	Daniel Hernandes (BRA)	Joel Brutus (HAI)	Martin Boonzaayer (USA)	Rigoberto Trujillo (CUB)
2007	Óscar Brayson (CUB)	João Schlittler (BRA)	Joel Brutus (HAI)	Carlos Zegarra (PER)
2011	Óscar Brayson (CUB)	Rafael Silva (BRA)	Anthony Turner (USA)	Pablo Figueroa (PUR)
2015	David Moura (BRA)	Freddy Figueroa (ECU)	Alex García Mendoza (CUB)	José Cuevas (MEX)
2019	Andy Granda (CUB)	Pedro Pineda (VEN)	Freddy Figueroa (ECU)	David Moura (BRA)
2023	Andy Granda (CUB)	Francisco Solis (CHI)	Rafael Silva (BRA)	José Nova (DOM)

=== Open ===
Year	Gold	Silver	Bronze	
1963	Benjamin Campbell (USA)	Georges Mehdi (BRA)	Joaquín Antrate (URU)	—
1967	Douglas Rogers (CAN)	James Westbrook (USA)	Humberto Medina (CUB)	Georges Mehdi (BRA)
1975	José Ibañez (CUB)	Jaime Felipa (AHO)	Chris Preobrazenski (CAN)	James Wooley (USA)
1979	Oswaldo Simões (BRA)	Héctor Estévez (PUR)	José Ibañez (CUB)	Joe Meli (CAN)
1983	Venancio Gómez (CUB)	Fred Blaney (CAN)	Desiderio Lebron (DOM)	José Fuentes (PUR)
1987	Jorge Fis (CUB)	Damon Keeve (USA)	Fred Blaney (CAN)	Rogério Cherobim (BRA)
1991	Jorge Fis (CUB)	Christophe Leininger (USA)	Orlando Baccino (ARG)	Charles Griffith (VEN)

== Women's events ==
=== Flyweight ===
- 45 kg

Year	Gold	Silver	Bronze	
1991	Mabel Fonseca (CUB)	Cathy Lee (USA)	Mônica Angelucci (BRA)	María Villapol (VEN)
1995	Mirledis Turro (CUB)	Sherrie Chambers (USA)	Dora Maldonado (HON)	Evelyn Matias (PUR)

=== Extra Lightweight ===
- 48 kg

Year	Gold	Silver	Bronze	
1983	Darlene Anaya (USA)	Inês Nazareth (BRA)	Tina Takahashi (CAN)	María Villapol (VEN)
1987	Mônica Angelucci (BRA)	Maricela Bonelli (CUB)	Darlene Anaya (USA)	Lyne Poirier (CAN)
1991	Legna Verdecia (CUB)	Valerie Lafon (USA)	Cristina de Souza (BRA)	Brigitte Lastrade (CAN)
1995	Amarilis Savón (CUB)	Carolyne Lepage (CAN)	Andrea Rodrigues (BRA)	María Villapol (VEN)
1999	Amarilis Savón (CUB)	Roselys Guacaran (VEN)	Adriana Angeles (MEX)	Lauren Meece (USA)
2003	Danieska Carrión (CUB)	Carolyne Lepage (CAN)	Lisseth Orozco (COL)	Analy Rodríguez (VEN)
2007	Yanet Bermoy (CUB)	Daniela Polzin (BRA)	Paula Pareto (ARG)	Jeanette Rodriguez (USA)
2011	Paula Pareto (ARG)	Dayaris Mestre (CUB)	Angela Woosley (USA)	Sarah Menezes (BRA)
2015	Dayaris Mestre (CUB)	Paula Pareto (ARG)	Edna Carrillo (MEX)	Nathália Brigida (BRA)
2019	Estefanía Soriano (DOM)	Vanesa Godinez (CUB)	Edna Carrillo (MEX)	Mary Dee Vargas (CHI)
2023	Alexia Nascimento (BRA)	Edna Carrillo (MEX)	Maria Celia Laborde (USA)	Amanda Lima (BRA)

=== Half Lightweight ===
- 52 kg

Year	Gold	Silver	Bronze	
1983	Mary Lewis (USA)	Nancy Clayton (CAN)	Cecilia Alacán (CUB)	Solange Almeida (BRA)
1987	Lisa Boscarino (PUR)	Jo Anne Quiring (USA)	Maritza Pérez (CUB)	Kathy Hubble (CAN)
1991	Maritza Pérez (CUB)	Patricia Bevilacqua (BRA)	Lisa Boscarino (PUR)	Carolina Mariani (ARG)
1995	Legna Verdecia (CUB)	Carolina Mariani (ARG)	Jo Anne Quiring (USA)	Nathalie Gosselin (CAN)
1999	Legna Verdecia (CUB)	Carolina Mariani (ARG)	Fabiane Hukuda (BRA)	Luce Baillargeon (CAN)
2003	Amarilis Savón (CUB)	Charlee Minkin (USA)	Fabiane Hukuda (BRA)	Flor Velázquez (VEN)
2007	Sheila Espinosa (CUB)	Érika Miranda (BRA)	María García (DOM)	Flor Velázquez (VEN)
2011	Yanet Bermoy (CUB)	Érika Miranda (BRA)	Angelica Delgado (USA)	Yulieth Sánchez (COL)
2015	Érika Miranda (BRA)	Ecaterina Guica (CAN)	Angelica Delgado (USA)	Gretter Romero (CUB)
2019	Larissa Pimenta (BRA)	Luz Olvera (MEX)	Kristine Jiménez (PAN)	Nahomys Acosta (CUB)
2023	Larissa Pimenta (BRA)	Paulina Martínez (MEX)	Angelica Delgado (USA)	Lilian Cordones (PAN)

=== Lightweight ===
- 56 kg (1983–1995)
- 57 kg (1999–)

Year	Gold	Silver	Bronze	
1983	AnnMaria De Mars (USA)	Natasha Hernández (VEN)	Ines Dantin (CUB)	Tânia Ishii (BRA)
1987	Cecilia Alacán (CUB)	Eve Trivella (USA)	Nathalie Gosselin (CAN)	Olga Lugo (VEN)
1991	Kate Donahoo (USA)	Altagracia Contreras (DOM)	Kenia Rodríguez (CUB)	Maniliz Segarra (PUR)
1995	Driulis González (CUB)	Corinna Broz (USA)	Renee Hock (CAN)	Danielle Zangrando (BRA)
1999	Driulis González (CUB)	Roxana García (PUR)	Brigitte Lastrade (CAN)	Danielle Zangrando (BRA)
2003	Yurisleidy Lupetey (CUB)	Rudymar Fleming (VEN)	Tânia Ferreira (BRA)	Ellen Wilson (USA)
2007	Danielle Zangrando (BRA)	Valerie Gotay (USA)	Yagnelis Mestre (CUB)	Diana Villavicencio (VEN)
2011	Yurisleidy Lupetey (CUB)	Rafaela Silva (BRA)	Joliane Melançon (CAN)	Hana Carmichael (USA)
2015	Marti Malloy (USA)	Catherine Beauchemin-Pinard (CAN)	Rafaela Silva (BRA)	Aliuska Ojeda (CUB)
2019	Ana Rosa García (DOM)	Yadinis Amarís (COL)	Anailis Dorvigni (CUB)	Miryam Roper (PAN)
2023	Rafaela Silva (BRA)	Brisa Gómez (ARG)	Kristine Jiménez (PAN)	María Villalba (COL)

=== Half Middleweight ===
- 61 kg (1983–1995)
- 63 kg (1999–)

Year	Gold	Silver	Bronze	
1983	Robin Chapman (USA)	Nereida Brito (VEN)	Diane Amyot (CAN)	Carla Duarte (BRA)
1987	Lynn Roethke (USA)	Natasha Hernández (VEN)	Amanda Clayton (CAN)	Soraya Carvalho (BRA)
1991	Ileana Beltrán (CUB)	Lynn Roethke (USA)	Xiomara Griffith (VEN)	Eleucadia Vargas (DOM)
1995	Ileana Beltrán (CUB)	Michelle Buckingham (CAN)	Xiomara Griffith (VEN)	Colleen MacDonald (USA)
1999	Vânia Ishii (BRA)	Celita Schutz (USA)	Kenia Rodríguez (CUB)	Eleucadia Vargas (DOM)
2003	Driulis González (CUB)	Vânia Ishii (BRA)	Daniela Krukower (ARG)	Isabelle Pearson (CAN)
2007	Driulis González (CUB)	Danielli Yuri (BRA)	Daniela Krukower (ARG)	Ysis Barreto (VEN)
2011	Yaritza Abel (CUB)	Karina Acosta (MEX)	Christal Ransom (USA)	Stéfanie Tremblay (CAN)
2015	Estefania García (ECU)	Stéfanie Tremblay (CAN)	Maylin del Toro (CUB)	Mariana Silva (BRA)
2019	Maylín del Toro (CUB)	Anriquelis Barrios (VEN)	Aléxia Castilhos (BRA)	Hannah Martin (USA)
2023	Maylín del Toro (CUB)	Isabelle Harris (CAN)	Prisca Awiti Alcaraz (MEX)	Ketleyn Quadros (BRA)

=== Middleweight ===
- 66 kg (1983–1995)
- 70 kg (1999–)

Year	Gold	Silver	Bronze	
1983	Christine Penick (USA)	Lorraine Methot (CAN)	Carolina Aguilar (VEN)	Vilma Cianelli (CHI)
1987	Sandra Greaves (CAN)	Andrea Hernández (DOM)	Marcia Quiñónez (ECU)	Christine Penick (USA)
1991	Odalis Revé (CUB)	Laura Martinel (ARG)	Francis Gómez (VEN)	Liliko Ogasawara (USA)
1995	Odalis Revé (CUB)	Liliko Ogasawara (USA)	Vânia Ishii (BRA)	Dulce Piña (DOM)
1999	Sibelis Veranes (CUB)	Xiomara Griffith (VEN)	Sandra Bacher (USA)	Lorena Briceño (ARG)
2003	Leyén Zulueta (CUB)	Christina Yannetsos (USA)	Diana Chalá (ECU)	Dulce Piña (DOM)
2007	Ronda Rousey (USA)	Mayra Aguiar (BRA)	Yuri Alvear (COL)	Catherine Roberge (CAN)
2011	Onix Cortés (CUB)	Yuri Alvear (COL)	María Pérez (PUR)	Maria Portela (BRA)
2015	Kelita Zupancic (CAN)	Onix Cortés (CUB)	Yuri Alvear (COL)	Maria Portela (BRA)
2019	Elvismar Rodríguez (VEN)	Yuri Alvear (COL)	María Pérez (PUR)	Onix Cortés (CUB)
2023	Idelannis Gómez (CUB)	María Pérez (PUR)	Elvismar Rodríguez (VEN)	Celinda Corozo (ECU)

=== Half Heavyweight ===
- 72 kg (1983–1995)
- 78 kg (1999–)

Year	Gold	Silver	Bronze	
1983	Allison Henry (VEN)	Nancy Jewitt (CAN)	Belinda Binkley (USA)	Nilda Espinoza (CUB)
1987	Soraia André (BRA)	Alison Webb (CAN)	María Cangá (ECU)	Anny Fernández (VEN)
1991	Niurka Moreno (CUB)	María Cangá (ECU)	Tammy Hensley (USA)	Alison Webb (CAN)
1995	Diadenis Luna (CUB)	Francis Gómez (VEN)	Valéria Brandino (BRA)	Grace Jividen (USA)
1999	Diadenis Luna (CUB)	Niki Jenkins (CAN)	Edinanci Silva (BRA)	Amy Tong (USA)
2003	Edinanci Silva (BRA)	Yurisel Laborde (CUB)	Amy Cotton (CAN)	Keivi Pinto (VEN)
2007	Edinanci Silva (BRA)	Yurisel Laborde (CUB)	Lorena Briceño (ARG)	Marylise Lévesque (CAN)
2011	Kayla Harrison (USA)	Catherine Roberge (CAN)	Yalennis Castillo (CUB)	Mayra Aguiar (BRA)
2015	Kayla Harrison (USA)	Mayra Aguiar (BRA)	Yalennis Castillo (CUB)	Catherine Roberge (CAN)
2019	Mayra Aguiar (BRA)	Kaliema Antomarchi (CUB)	Diana Brenes (CRC)	Vanessa Chalá (ECU)
2023	Samanta Soares (BRA)	Sairy Colón (PUR)	Camila Figueroa (PER)	Eiraima Silvestre (DOM)

=== Heavyweight ===
- +72 kg (1983–1995)
- +78 kg (1999–)

Year	Gold	Silver	Bronze	
1983	Margaret Castro (USA)	Regla Povea (CUB)	Soraia André (BRA)	Sara Rilves (CAN)
1987	Nilmaris Santini (PUR)	Margaret Castro (USA)	Estela Rodríguez (CUB)	Rosemeri Salvador (BRA)
1991	Estela Rodríguez (CUB)	Nilmaris Santini (PUR)	Edilene Andrade (BRA)	Jane Patterson (CAN)
1995	Daima Beltrán (CUB)	Edilene Andrade (BRA)	Nancy Filteau (CAN)	Colleen Rosensteel (USA)
1999	Daima Beltrán (CUB)	Colleen Rosensteel (USA)	Carmen Chalá (ECU)	Priscila Marques (BRA)
2003	Daima Beltrán (CUB)	Giovanna Blanco (VEN)	Olia Berger (CAN)	Carmen Chalá (ECU)
2007	Vanessa Zambotti (MEX)	Carmen Chalá (ECU)	Ivis Dueñas (CUB)	Priscila Marques (BRA)
2011	Idalys Ortiz (CUB)	Melissa Mojica (PUR)	Maria Suelen Altheman (BRA)	Vanessa Zambotti (MEX)
2015	Idalys Ortiz (CUB)	Vanessa Zambotti (MEX)	Maria Suelen Altheman (BRA)	Nina Cutro-Kelly (USA)
2019	Idalys Ortiz (CUB)	Melissa Mojica (PUR)	Beatriz Souza (BRA)	Yuliana Bolívar (PER)
2023	Idalys Ortiz (CUB)	Brigitte Carabalí (COL)	Moira Morillo (DOM)	Beatriz Souza (BRA)

=== Open ===
Year	Gold	Silver	Bronze	
1983	Heidi Bauersachs (USA)	Allison Henry (VEN)	Regla Povea (CUB)	Sara Rilves (CAN)
1987	Margaret Castro (USA)	Estela Rodríguez (CUB)	Francis Gómez (VEN)	Ivana Santana (BRA)
1991	Estela Rodríguez (CUB)	Nilmaris Santini (PUR)	Soraia André (BRA)	Jane Patterson (CAN)

== Mixed events ==
Year	Gold	Silver	Bronze	
2023	Cuba; Lianet Cardona; Idelannis Gómez; Liester Cardona; Omar Cruz; Magdiel Estrada; Andy Granda; Maikel McKenzie; Orlando Polanco; Iván Felipe Silva; Maylín del Toro; Idalys Ortíz	Brazil; Gabriel Falcão; Luana Carvalho; Rafael Macedo; Rafael Silva; Rafaela Silva; Samanta Soares; Daniel Cargnin; Leonardo Gonçalves; Willian Lima; Larissa Pimenta; Alexia Castilhos; Beatriz Souza; Guilherme Schimidt	Colombia; Brigitte Carabalí; Francisco Balanta; María Villalba; Luisa Bonilla; Daniel Paz; Andrés Sandoval	Dominican Republic; Ariela Sánchez; Eiraima Silvestre; Estefanía Soriano; Moira Morillo; Medickson del Orbe; Ana Rosa García; Robert Florentino; José Nova; Elmert Ramírez; Antonio Tornal
