= Brazil at the 1972 Summer Olympics =

- IOC code: BRA
- NOC: Brazilian Olympic Committee

in Munich
- Competitors: 81 (78 men and 3 women) in 13 sports
- Flag bearer: Luiz Cláudio Menon
- Medals Ranked 41st: Gold 0 Silver 0 Bronze 2 Total 2

Summer Olympics appearances (overview)
- 1920; 1924; 1928; 1932; 1936; 1948; 1952; 1956; 1960; 1964; 1968; 1972; 1976; 1980; 1984; 1988; 1992; 1996; 2000; 2004; 2008; 2012; 2016; 2020; 2024; 2028

Brazil competed at the 1972 Summer Olympics in Munich, West Germany. 81 competitors, 78 men and 3 women, took part in 44 events in 13 sports. Brazil obtained two bronze medals in 1972. Japanese Brazilian judoka Chiaki Ishii won Brazil's first Olympic medal in judo. Triple jumper Nelson Prudêncio won his second medal in men's triple jump.

== Medalists ==
Medal	Name	Sport	Event	Date
Bronze	Chiaki Ishii	Judo	Men's 93 kg	September 1
Bronze	Nelson Prudêncio	Athletics	Men's triple jump	September 4

Medals by sport
Sport	1st place, gold medalist(s)	2nd place, silver medalist(s)	3rd place, bronze medalist(s)	Total
Judo	0	0	1	1
Athletics	0	0	1	1
Total	0	0	2	2

Medals by gender
Gender	1st place, gold medalist(s)	2nd place, silver medalist(s)	3rd place, bronze medalist(s)	Total
Male	0	0	2	2
Female	0	0	0	0
Mixed	0	0	0	0
Total	0	0	2	2

== Athletics ==
Men
Track & road events

Athlete	Event	Heat		Quarterfinal		Semifinal		Final	
Athlete	Event	Result	Rank	Result	Rank	Result	Rank	Result	Rank
Luiz Gonzaga da Silva	100 m	10.63	5	Did not advance					
Luiz Gonzaga da Silva	200 m	21.81	5	Did not advance					

Field events

Athlete	Event	Qualification		Final	
Athlete	Event	Distance	Position	Distance	Position
Nelson Prudêncio	Triple jump	16.42	7 Q	17.05	3rd place, bronze medalist(s)

== Basketball ==
=== Preliminary round ===
==== Group A ====
The top two teams from each group advance to the semifinals, while the remaining teams compete for 5th through 16th places in separate brackets.

Qualified for the semifinals

Team	W	L	PF	PA	PD	Pts	1st Tie
United States	7	0	542	312	+230	14	
Cuba	6	1	560	445	+115	13	
Brazil	4	3	561	490	+71	11	1W–0L
Czechoslovakia	4	3	493	489	+4	11	0W–1L
Spain	3	4	486	500	−14	10	1W–0L
Australia	3	4	523	524	−1	10	0W–1L
Japan	1	6	442	643	−201	8	
Egypt	0	7	440	644	−204	7	

August 27
14:30

Japan	55–110	Brazil

Rudi-Sedlmayer-Halle, Munich

August 28
9:00

Brazil	110–84	Egypt

Rudi-Sedlmayer-Halle, Munich

August 29
9:00

Brazil	72–69	Spain

Rudi-Sedlmayer-Halle, Munich

August 30
21:30

Brazil	54–61	United States

Rudi-Sedlmayer-Halle, Munich

September 1
21:30

Czechoslovakia	82–83	Brazil

Rudi-Sedlmayer-Halle, Munich

September 2
9:00

Australia	75–69	Brazil

Rudi-Sedlmayer-Halle, Munich

September 3
21:30

Cuba	64–63	Brazil

Rudi-Sedlmayer-Halle, Munich

=== Classification brackets ===
September 7
21:30

Puerto Rico	87–83	Brazil

Rudi-Sedlmayer-Halle, Munich

September 7
21:30

Brazil	87–69	Czechoslovakia

Rudi-Sedlmayer-Halle, Munich

== Boxing ==
Men

Athlete	Event	1 Round	2 Round	3 Round	Quarterfinals	Semifinals	Final	
Athlete	Event	Opposition Result	Opposition Result	Opposition Result	Opposition Result	Opposition Result	Opposition Result	Rank
Deusdete Vasconcelos	Bantamweight	BYE	Kim Jong-Ik (PRK); L 1-4	Did not advance				
Waldemar de Oliveira	Light heavyweight	BYE	Nghivav Mehtab Singh (IND); W 5-0	Isaac Ikhouria (NGR); L 0-5	Did not advance			

== Cycling ==
Two cyclists represented Brazil in 1972.

=== Road ===
Athlete	Event	Time	Rank
Luiz Carlos Flores	Road race	DNF	
Miguel Silva Júnior	Road race	DNF	

== Equestrian ==
=== Dressage ===
Athlete	Horse	Event	Qualification		Final		Overall	
Athlete	Horse	Event	Score	Rank	Score	Rank	Score	Rank
Sylvio de Rezende	Othelo	Individual	1431	25	Did not advance			

=== Show jumping ===
Athlete	Horse	Event	Round 1		Round 2		Final		
Athlete	Horse	Event	Penalties	Rank	Penalties	Rank	Total	Jump-off	Rank
Antônio Simões	Individual	Bon Soir	16.00	31	Did not advance				
Nelson Pessoa Filho	Individual	Nagir	21.00	39	Did not advance				

== Football ==
=== First round ===
==== Group C ====
Team	Pld	W	D	L	GF	GA	GD	Pts
Hungary	3	2	1	0	9	2	+7	5
Denmark	3	2	0	1	7	4	+3	4
Iran	3	1	0	2	1	9	−8	2
Brazil	3	0	1	2	4	6	−2	1

27 August 1972
12:00

Denmark	3 – 2	Brazil
Simonsen 28' 83'; Røntved 50'	Report	Dirceu 68'; Zé Carlos 69'

Dreiflüssestadion, Passau
Attendance: 10.000
Referee: Pavel Kazakov (Soviet Union)

29 August 1972
12:00

Hungary	2 – 2	Brazil
A. Dunai 4'; Juhász 84'	Report	Pedrinho 67'; Dirceu 73'

Olympic Stadium, Munich
Attendance: 50.000
Referee: William Mullan (United Kingdom)

31 August 1972
12:00

Iran	1 – 0	Brazil
Halvai 63'	Report

Jahnstadion, Regensburg
Attendance: 2.200
Referee: Gerhard Schulenburg (West Germany)
- Team Roster
  - Vitor
  - Osmar
  - Fred
  - Terezo
  - Falcão
  - Celso
  - Pedrinho
  - Rubens Galaxe
  - Washington
  - Roberto Dinamite
  - Dirceu
  - Nielsen
  - Abel Braga
  - Wagner
  - Bolívar
  - Ângelo
  - Pintinho
  - Zé Carlos
  - Manoel

== Judo ==
Men

Athlete	Event	Round 1	Round 2	Round 3	Round 4	Repechage 1	Repechage 2	Repechage 3	Semifinal	Final / BM	
Athlete	Event	Opposition Result	Opposition Result	Opposition Result	Opposition Result	Opposition Result	Opposition Result	Opposition Result	Opposition Result	Opposition Result	Rank
Lhofei Shiozawa	−80 kg	—N/a	Tommy Tegelgård (SWE); W 1000-0000	Jean-Paul Coche (FRA); L 0000-0100	Did not advance						13
Chiaki Ishii	−93 kg	Mohamed Dione (SEN); W 1000-0000	Juang Jen-Wuh (ROC); W 1000-0000	Pavle Bajčetić (YUG); W 1000-0000	Paul Barth (FRG); L 0000-0100	Did not advance			Helmut Howiller (GDR); W 1000-0000	David Starbrook (GBR); W 1000-0000	3rd place, bronze medalist(s)
Chiaki Ishii	Open	—N/a	BYE	Vitali Kuznetsov (URS); L 0000-1000	Did not advance	Barry Johnson (AUS); W 1000-0000	Wim Ruska (NED); L 0000-1000	Did not advance			7

== Rowing ==
Men

Athlete	Event	Heats		Repechage		Semifinals		Final	
Athlete	Event	Time	Rank	Time	Rank	Time	Rank	Time	Rank
Raúl Bagattini; Érico de Souza	Coxless pair	7:42.02	4 R	7:42.63	3	Did not advance			

== Sailing ==
Open

Athlete	Event	Race														Final rank	
Athlete	Event	1		2		3		4		5		6		7		Final rank	
Athlete	Event	Score	Rank	Score	Rank	Score	Rank	Score	Rank	Score	Rank	Score	Rank	Score	Rank	Score	Rank
Claudio Biekarck	Finn	14	20.0	13	19.0	23	29.0	16	22.0	10	16.0	~~DNF~~	~~41.0~~	3	5.7	105.7	9
Reinaldo Conrad; Burkhard Cordes	Flying Dutchman	12	18.0	3	5.7	~~19~~	~~25.0~~	9	15.0	9	15.0	2	3.0	3	5.7	62.4	4
Mario Buckup; Peter Ficker	Tempest	~~19~~	~~25.0~~	3	5.7	7	13.0	7	13.0	16	22.0	5	10.0	5	10.0	73.7	7
Jörg Bruder; Jan Willem Aten	Star	6	11.7	~~16.0~~	~~8~~	10	14.0	5	10.0	1	0.0	2	3.0	8	14.0	52.7	4
Erik Schmidt; Axel Schmidt; Patrick Mascarenhas	Soling	5	10.0	9	15.0	4	8.0	14	20.0	6	11.7	~~17~~	~~23.0~~	—N/a		64.7	6

== Shooting ==
Four male shooters represented Brazil in 1972.

Men

Athlete	Event	Final	
Athlete	Event	Score	Rank
Durval Guimarães	50 m pistol	534	46
Túlio Miraglia	Trap	171	46
Marcos José Olsen	Trap	191	8
Bertino de Souza	50 m pistol	539	36

== Swimming ==
Men

Athlete	Event	Heat		Semifinal		Final	
Athlete	Event	Time	Rank	Time	Rank	Time	Rank
José Aranha	100 metre freestyle	54.06	3 Q	53.47	5	Did not advance	
Rômulo Arantes	100 metre backstroke	1:03.18	4	Did not advance			
Rômulo Arantes	200 metre backstroke	2:18.15	6	Did not advance			
Antônio Azevedo	200 metre medley	2:19.41	4	Did not advance			
Antônio Azevedo	400 metre medley	4:57.27	6	Did not advance			
José Fiolo	100 metre breaststroke	1:06.23	2 Q	1:05.99	2 Q	1:06.24	6
José Fiolo	200 metre breaststroke	2:30.21	3	Did not advance			
Alfredo Machado	200 metre freestyle	2:00.14	5	Did not advance			
Alfredo Machado	400 metre freestyle	4:18.05	5	Did not advance			
Alfredo Machado	1500 metre freestyle	17:20.34	6	Did not advance			
Ruy de Oliveira	100 metre freestyle	54.26	1	Did not advance			
Ruy de Oliveira	200 metre freestyle	2:00.48	4	Did not advance			
Sérgio Waismann	100 metre butterfly	58.37	3 Q	58.07	6	Did not advance	
Paulo Zanetti	100 metre freestyle	54.97	4	Did not advance			
Ruy de Oliveira; Paulo Zanetti; Paulo Becskehazy; José Aranha	4 × 100 metre freestyle relay	3:35.84	4 Q	—N/a		3:33.14	4
Alfredo Machado; Ruy de Oliveira; Paulo Zanetti; José Aranha	4 × 200 metre freestyle relay	8:17.91	6	Did not advance			
Rômulo Arantes Filho; José Sylvio Fiolo; Sérgio Waismann; José Aranha	4 × 100 metre medley relay	3:58.56	3 Q	—N/a		3:57.89	5

Women

Athlete	Event	Heat		Semifinal		Final	
Athlete	Event	Time	Rank	Time	Rank	Time	Rank
Lucy Burle	100 metre freestyle	1:03.12	6	Did not advance			
Lucy Burle	200 metre freestyle	2:18.57	6	Did not advance			
Maria Isabel Guerra	100 metre butterfly	2:32.60	7	Did not advance			
Maria Isabel Guerra	200 metre medley	2:32.95	6	Did not advance			
Maria Isabel Guerra	400 metre medley	5:24.43	4	Did not advance			
Cristina Teixeira	100 metre breaststroke	1:20.58	7	Did not advance			
Cristina Teixeira	200 metre breaststroke	2:57.03	DSQ	Did not advance			

== Volleyball ==
=== Preliminary round ===
Pool B

Pos	Team	Pld	W	L	Pts	SW	SL	SR	SPW	SPL	SPR	Qualification
1	Japan	5	5	0	10	15	0	MAX	225	95	2.368	Semifinals
2	East Germany	5	4	1	9	12	4	3.000	200	162	1.235	Semifinals
3	Romania	5	2	3	7	8	9	0.889	201	213	0.944	5th–8th semifinals
4	Brazil	5	2	3	7	9	13	0.692	273	280	0.975	5th–8th semifinals
5	Cuba	5	2	3	7	6	13	0.462	212	254	0.835	9th place match
6	West Germany	5	0	5	5	4	15	0.267	163	270	0.604	11th place match

Date		Score		Set 1	Set 2	Set 3	Set 4	Set 5	Total
28 Aug	Brazil	3–2	West Germany	15–7	15–8	17–19	6–15	15–9	68–58
30 Aug	East Germany	3–1	Brazil	15–5	7–15	16–14	15–10		53–44
01 Sep	Brazil	3–2	Romania	18–16	11–15	15–7	11–15	15–12	70–65
03 Sep	Japan	3–0	Brazil	15–7	15–13	15–11			45–31
06 Sep	Cuba	3–2	Brazil	16–14	6–15	15–7	7–15	15–9	59–60

=== 5th–8th semifinals ===
Date		Score		Set 1	Set 2	Set 3	Set 4	Set 5	Total
08 Sep	Czechoslovakia	3–0	Brazil	15–8	15–6	15–1			45–15

=== 7th place match ===
Date		Score		Set 1	Set 2	Set 3	Set 4	Set 5	Total
09 Sep	Brazil	0–3	South Korea	16–18	7–15	5–15			28–48

=== Team roster ===
- João Lens
- Delano Couto
- Antônio Carlos Moreno
- Luiz Eymard Coelho
- José Marcelino
- Mário Marcos Procópio
- Bebeto de Freitas
- Paulo Sevciuc
- Décio Cattaruzzi
- Alexandre Abeid
- Celso Alexandre Kalache
- Aderval Luis Arvani

== Weightlifting ==
Men

Athlete	Event	Military Press		Snatch		Clean & jerk		Total	Rank
Athlete	Event	Result	Rank	Result	Rank	Result	Rank	Total	Rank
Luiz de Almeida	82.5 kg	140.0	15	120.0	17	165.0	15	425.0	15
Thamer Chaim	+110 kg	175.0	12	135.0	11	180.0	10	490.0	11
