= Judo at the 1972 Summer Olympics – Men's 93 kg =

Judo competition

Men's 93kg at the Games of the XX Olympiad
- Venue: Judo and Wrestling Hall
- Date: 1 September 1972
- Competitors: 29 from 29 nations

Medalists
1st place, gold medalist(s)		Shota Chochishvili	Soviet Union
2nd place, silver medalist(s)		David Starbrook	Great Britain
3rd place, bronze medalist(s)		Paul Barth	West Germany
3rd place, bronze medalist(s)		Chiaki Ishii	Brazil

The men's 93 kg competition in judo at the 1972 Summer Olympics in Munich, West Germany was held at the Judo and Wrestling Hall.

== Results ==
=== Finals ===
Semi-finals
Shota Chochishvili (URS)	1:05
Paul Barth (FRG)	3rd place, bronze medalist(s)
David Starbrook (GBR)	5:00
Chiaki Ishii (BRA)	3rd place, bronze medalist(s)

Final
Shota Chochishvili (URS)	10:00 (gold)
David Starbrook (GBR)	2nd place, silver medalist(s)

=== Repechages ===
Repechage		Repechage semifinal		Repechage final
Pierre Albertini (FRA)	6:00
Frédéric Kyburz (SUI)	E	Shota Chochoshvili (URS)	1:37
		Pierre Albertini (FRA)	E
				Shota Chochoshvili (URS)	2:36
				James Wooley (USA)	E

Repechage		Repechage semifinal		Repechage final
Helmut Howiller (GDR)	6:00
Włodzimierz Lewin (POL)	E	Helmut Howiller (GDR)	6:00
		Terry Farnsworth (CAN)	E
				Helmut Howiller (GDR)	E
				Chiaki Ishii (BRA)	0:57

=== Pool A ===
Round of 32
Du Yong Cha (PRK)	E DNS
Shota Chochoshvili (URS)	0:00
Fumio Sasahara (JPN)	0:27
Barry Johnson (AUS)	E
Pierre Albertini (FRA)	2:29
Hans-Jakob Schädler (LIE)	E
David Starbrook (GBR)	0:24
Frédéric Kyburz (SUI)	R
James Wooley (USA)	1:57
Juan Marin (PUR)	E
Hamadi Camara (MLI)	E
Kim Euy-Tae (KOR)	0:22
Antoine Chidiac (LIB)	E
Jan Bosman (NED)	1:00
Fernando García (PHI)	0:00
BYE

Round of 16
Shota Chochoshvili (URS)	5:10
Fumio Sasahara (JPN)	E
Pierre Albertini (FRA)	R
David Starbrook (GBR)	6:00
James Wooley (USA)	1:27
Kim Euy-Tae (KOR)	E
Jan Bosman (NED)	0:30
Fernando García (PHI)	E

Quarterfinal
Shota Chochoshvili (URS)	R
David Starbrook (GBR)	6:00
James Wooley (USA)	6:00
Jan Bosman (NED)	E

Semifinal
David Starbrook (GBR)	4:33
James Wooley (USA)	R

=== Pool B ===
Round of 32
Paul Barth (FRG)	6:00
Helmut Howiller (GDR)	R
Włodzimierz Lewin (POL)	6:00
Patrick Murphy (IRL)	E
José Ibañez (CUB)	6:00
Luvsansharavyn Rentsendorj (MGL)	E
Terry Farnsworth (CAN)	6:00
Imre Varga (HUN)	E
Epigmenio Exiga (MEX)	E
Juang Jen-wuh (ROC)	5:00
Mohamed Dione (SEN)	E
Chiaki Ishii (BRA)	0:16
Roberto Solórzano (CRC)	E
Eduard Aellig (AUT)	0:19
Pavle Bajčetić (YUG)	0:00
BYE

Round of 16
Paul Barth (FRG)	6:00
Włodzimierz Lewin (POL)	R
José Ibañez (CUB)	E
Terry Farnsworth (CAN)	0:37
Juang Jen-Wuh (ROC)	E
Chiaki Ishii (BRA)	0:38
Eduard Aellig (AUT)	E
Pavle Bajčetić (YUG)	6:00

Quarterfinal
Paul Barth (FRG)	6:00
Terry Farnsworth (CAN)	R
Chiaki Ishii (BRA)	6:00
Pavle Bajčetić (YUG)	E

Semifinal
Paul Barth (FRG)	6:00
Chiaki Ishii (BRA)	R
