= WWE Hall of Fame (2026) =

Professional wrestling induction event

- Promotional poster featuring 2026 inductees AJ Styles, Stephanie McMahon, and Demolition (Ax and Smash)
- Promotion: WWE
- Date: April 17, 2026
- City: Las Vegas, Nevada
- Venue: Dolby Live at Park MGM

WWE Hall of Fame chronology
← Previous; 2025	Next → —

The 2026 WWE Hall of Fame was a professional wrestling event produced by WWE that featured the induction of the 27th class into the WWE Hall of Fame. The ceremony took place on April 17, 2026, in Las Vegas, Nevada at Dolby Live at Park MGM the night before WrestleMania 42. It aired live on the ESPN app in the United States and on YouTube internationally.

The first announced inductee into the Class of 2026 was former WWE executive and on-screen personality Stephanie McMahon, who was revealed via an announcement by the promotion during the Wrestlepalooza event on September 20, 2025. Additional inductees for the Class of 2026 were announced in the months leading up to WrestleMania 42.

== Background ==
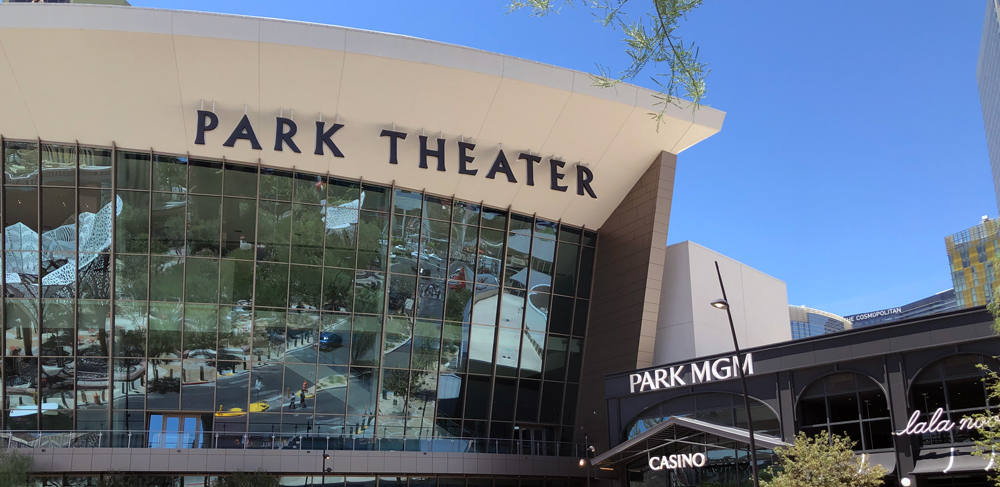
The ceremony was held at Dolby Live at Park MGM in Las Vegas, Nevada.

On September 20, 2025, during WWE's event Wrestlepalooza, Class of 2022 WWE Hall of Famer The Undertaker officially announced Stephanie McMahon as the first inductee of the Class of 2026.

On the February 23, 2026, episode of Raw, Undertaker made another appearance to announce that AJ Styles, who was holding his retirement ceremony that night, would be the second inductee.

On March 2, 2026, Undertaker announced the third inductees as the tag team of Demolition (Ax and Smash). WWE later announced that the ceremony would take place the night before WrestleMania 42 on April 17, 2026, at Dolby Live at Park MGM in Las Vegas, Nevada, following the broadcast of their regular Friday night program, SmackDown.

On March 20, 2026, it was reported by ESPN that National Basketball Association (NBA) player Dennis Rodman, known in wrestling primarily for his time in World Championship Wrestling as part of the New World Order in the late 1990s, would be the first celebrity inductee of the Class of 2026. Eric Bischoff was asked to induct Rodman, but declined due to his commitments producing RAF 08 that same weekend.

On March 24, 2026, WWE announced that former two-time WWF Champion and two-time WCW World Heavyweight Champion Sid Eudy, notably known as Sid Vicious, Sid Justice, and Sycho Sid, would be posthumously inducted as the first legacy inductee of the Class of 2026.

On March 26, 2026, WWE announced that the two-time gold medalist and one-time bronze medalist and former four-time Stampede Wrestling North American Heavyweight Champion Allen Coage, notably known as Buffalo Allen, Bad News Allen, and Bad News Brown, would be posthumously inducted as a legacy inductee of the Class of 2026.

On March 31, 2026, WWE announced that the WrestleMania III match between Hulk Hogan and André the Giant for the WWF World Heavyweight Championship would be the Immortal Moment for the Class of 2026. This induction made Hogan a three-time inductee, having previously been inducted for his solo career in 2005 and as part of the stable, the New World Order, in 2020. This also made André a two-time inductee after previously being inducted posthumously for his solo career in 1993, which was also the inaugural induction for the Hall of Fame.

== Reception ==
The Hall of Fame ceremony didn't get much interest in comparison with previous years, with only 2,549 tickets sold before the event. Sid's son, Gunnar Eudy, heavily criticized the induction of his father, mentioning lack of merchandise, publicity and being rushed in a video package. This criticism was backed by several supporters such as Jim Ross, calling the Legacy Wing "a joke".

== Inductees ==
=== Individual ===
- Class headliners appear in **boldface**

Image	Inductee (real name)	Inducted by	WWE recognized accolades
	**Stephanie McMahon**	Linda McMahon, Aurora Levesque, Murphy Levesque, and Vaughn Levesque	Former WWE Chief Brand Officer, Chairwoman, and Co-CEO; On-screen authority figure for over two decades One-time WWF Women's Champion; Two-time Slammy Award winner
	AJ Styles (Allen Jones)	Luke Gallows and Karl Anderson	Two-time WWE Champion; One-time WWE Intercontinental Champion; Three-time WWE United States Champion; Two-time WWE Raw/World Tag Team Champion; One-time Slammy Award winner

=== Group ===
Image	Inductee (real name)	Inducted by	WWE recognized accolades as a team
	Demolition	Arn Anderson, Haku, and The Warlord	Three-time and longest-reigning WWF Tag Team Champions
Ax (William Eadie); Smash (Barry Darsow)

=== Celebrity ===
Image	Inductee (real name)	Inducted by	WWE recognized accolades
	Dennis Rodman	Kevin Nash and Sean Waltman	Five-time NBA champion Wrestled in World Championship Wrestling as a member of the New World Order

=== Legacy ===
Image	Recipient (Birth name)	WWE recognized accolades
	Sid (Sidney Eudy)	Two-time WWF Champion; Two-time WCW World Heavyweight Champion; One-time WCW United States Champion
	Bad News Brown (Allen Coage)	1976 Olympic Bronze Medalist; Two-time Pan American Games Gold Medalist (1967 and 1975); Four-time Stampede Wrestling North American Heavyweight Champion

=== Immortal Moment ===
Image	Recipient	Inducted by	Description
	Hulk Hogan (c) vs. André the Giant from WrestleMania III	Jimmy Hart	Singles match for the WWF World Heavyweight Championship
Accepted by Hogan's son Nick Hogan and Andre's daughter Robin Roussimoff; Hulk Hogan (Terry Bollea) – Posthumous and three-time inductee: previously inducted in 2005 for his individual career and in 2020 as a member of the New World Order (both while alive); André the Giant (André Roussimoff) – Posthumous and two-time inductee: previously inducted in 1993 for his individual career
