= Andrea Fernández =

Andrea Fernández may refer to:

- Andrea Fernández (politician) (born 1992), Spanish lawyer and politician
- Andrea Fernández (gymnast) (born 2006), Spanish gymnast
- Andrea Fernández (footballer) (fl. present), Spanish footballer

== See also ==
- Andrea Hernández (disambiguation)
- Andrés Fernández (disambiguation)
