= Inés Kaspers =

Spanish judoka

Personal information
- Born: 7 February 1948 (age 78) Amsterdam, Netherlands
- Occupation: Judoka

Sport
- Country: Spain
- Sport: Judo
- Weight class: –72 kg

Achievements and titles
- World Champ.: 5th (1980)
- European Champ.: (bronze) (1982)
Medal record
Women's judo
Representing Spain
European Championships
Gold medal – first place	1982 Oslo	–72 kg

Profile at external databases
- JudoInside.com: 5941
- Updated on 21 June 2022

Inés Kaspers (born 7 February 1948) is a Dutch-born Spanish judoka who competed at international judo competitions. She was a four-time Spanish national champion, a European bronze medalist and was the first Spanish female judoka to compete at the first women's World Judo Championships in New York City.

Kaspers grew up in Amsterdam, she had a hard upbringing as her parents worked in the city's red light district. She left the Netherlands aged eighteen and emigrated to Spain where she married and gave birth to her son.
