= Terry Farnsworth =

Canadian judoka (born 1942)

Personal information
- National team: Canada
- Born: 27 August 1942 (age 83) Portland, Maine, United States
- Education: Chuo University
- Occupation: Judoka
- Height: 183 cm (6 ft 0 in)
- Weight: 91 kg (201 lb)

Sport
- Country: Canada
- Sport: Judo
- Weight class: 93 kg (half-heavyweight)

Achievements and titles
- National finals: Canadian U-93 kg Champion (1972, 1973)
Medal record
Judo
Representing Canada
Maccabiah Games
Gold medal – first place	1969 Israel	Men's 93 kg
Silver medal – second place	1973 Israel	Men's 93 kg

Terry Farnsworth (born 27 August 1942) is a Canadian former Olympic judoka. Born in Portland, Maine, he represented Canada in international judo competitions. He won the Canadian under-93 kg national championship in both 1972 and 1973, and competed in the men's half-heavyweight event at the 1972 Summer Olympics. Farnsworth also won a gold medal at the 1969 Maccabiah Games and a silver medal at the 1973 Maccabiah Games, both held in Israel.

== Biography ==
Farnsworth was born in Portland, Maine, and is Jewish. After graduating high school, he completed two years of a pre-college program in Canada. He then lived in Roppongi, Tokyo, Japan, from the age of 20 to 26, during which he studied at Chuo University. He has also lived in Bois-des-Filion, Quebec, Canada.

=== Judo career ===
Farnsworth earned a black belt in judo in Montreal, after which he moved to Tokyo to further his training.

At the 1969 Maccabiah Games in Israel, he won a gold medal in the light-heavyweight division. He won the under-93 kg category at the 1972 Canadian Judo Championships, held in Halifax.

Farnsworth represented Canada in the men's half-heavyweight (under 93 kg) event at the 1972 Summer Olympics, finishing in 7th place. He defeated Imre Varga of Hungary and José Ibáñez Gómez of Cuba, but was eliminated after losses to eventual bronze medalist Paul Barth and European Judo Champion Helmut Howiller, both from West Germany.

Farnsworth recounted his experience during the Munich massacre at the 1972 Olympics, in which members of the Palestinian militant group Black September infiltrated the Olympic Village:

I was 50 feet away. I saw... the Arab with the mask, standing on the balcony. I saw the guy. I mean, we had to run underneath where the Israelis were, and one of my buddies had an Israeli friend, went to visit him, and he came back at 1:30 in the morning, and the terrorists came in at about 3:00. So he was an hour and a half away from being dead himself. That was horrible. We were 50 feet away from the whole thing. One interesting story was, separating us was the Korean housing, and when it first happened, I walked down to the Korean apartments, and I saw the door open in one apartment. I see a Korean guy sitting in the window with his rifle, facing the Arabs or where the Israelis were held. He told me he was an ex-American Marine, but he was a Korean citizen. He was on the rifle team. He said, “I’m going to get one of those f*cking Arabs!” ... But they came and took his rifle away!

In 1973, Farnsworth won the Canadian Championships again in the under-93 kg category, this time in Whitehorse.

He was selected as the flag bearer for Team Canada at the 1973 Maccabiah Games in Israel, where he won a silver medal in the light-heavyweight division, losing in the final to American Olympian Irwin Cohen.

=== Film career ===
Farnsworth appeared in several films, including a minor role in Walk, Don't Run (1966), an American comedy starring Cary Grant, and a supporting role in The Drifting Avenger (1968), a Japanese Western filmed in Australia. He also acted in the Japanese tokusatsu science fiction television series Ultraseven (1967–1968).

== See also ==
- Judo in Canada
- List of Canadian judoka
