= Seino (surname) =

Seino (written: 清野) is a Japanese surname. Notable people with the surname include:

- Hiromi Seino-Suga (清野-菅 弘美; born 1973), Japanese biathlete
- Nana Seino (清野 菜名; born 1994), Japanese actress
- Shizuru Seino (清野 静流; born 1976), Japanese manga artist
- Tomoaki Seino (清野 智秋; born 1981), Japanese footballer
- Toshiyuki Seino (清野 敏幸; born 1938), American competitive judoka
