= Jimmy Westbrook =

James or Jimmy Westbrook may refer to:

- Jimmy Westbrook, character in Captain America and the Falcon
- Jimi Westbrook, musician in Little Big Town
- James Westbrook (judoka), participated in Judo at the 1967 Pan American Games
