= Bajčetić =

Bajčetić (Serbian Cyrillic: Бајчетић) is a South Slavic surname. It may be photetically transliterated as Baychetich. Notable people with the surname include:

- Pavle Bajčetić (born 1945), Yugoslav Olympic judoka
- Srđan Bajčetić (born 1971), Serbian football midfielder, father of Stefan
- Stefan Bajcetic (born 2004), Spanish football midfielder, son of Srđan
