= James Wooley =

'James Wooley or Woolley may refer to:

- Jimmy Wooley (born March 8, 1949), American judoka.
- James Woolley, keyboard player for the group Nine Inch Nails
