= Barbara Fest =

American judoka

Barbara Fest (born 6 July 1953) is a retired American judoka. She medalled multiple times in the US National Championships. She won a bronze medal at the 1980 World Judo Championships in the open weight division. For a period she was coached by James Pedro Sr.
