= Pierre Albertini =

Pierre Albertini may refer to:

- Pierre Albertini (politician) (born 1944), French politician
- Pierre Albertini (judoka) (1942–2017), French judoka
