= Frédéric Kyburz =

Swiss judoka (1943–2018)

Personal information
- Nationality: Swiss
- Born: 10 August 1943
- Died: 1 August 2018 (aged 74)

Sport
- Sport: Judo

Frédéric Kyburz (10 August 1943 – 1 August 2018) was a Swiss judoka. He competed in the men's half-heavyweight event at the 1972 Summer Olympics.
