= Toshiyuki Seino =

American judoka (born 1938)

Personal information
- Nationality: (United States) American
- Born: Toshiyuki Seino; October 26, 1938 (age 87) Hawthorne, California, U.S.
- Education: Los Angeles City College
- Occupation: Judo Instructor
- Height: 5 ft 9 in (1.75 m)
- Spouse: Midori Seino

Sport
- Country: United States
- Sport: Judo
- Rank: 8th dan black belt
- Club: Gardena Judo Club
Medal record
Men's judo
Representing the United States
Pan American Games
Gold medal – first place	1963 São Paulo	U70 kg
Silver medal – second place	1967 Winnipeg	U70 kg
Pan American Judo Championships
Gold medal – first place	1965 Guatemala City	U68 kg
Gold medal – first place	1968 San Juan	U70 kg

Profile at external databases
- JudoInside.com: 9962

Toshiyuki “Tosh” Seino (born October 1938) is an American former competitive judo athlete. Seino was born in Hawthorne, California, United States. After spending several years incarcerated in an internment camp at California's Tule Lake during World War II, he and his family moved to Japan. Seino won numerous judo competitions at both the national and international levels, beating heavyweight Olympian George Harris, despite being a middleweight. He returned to the United States at age 20. Seino was an AAU National Champion in Judo. Seino enlisted in the US Air Force in 1959 and served as a self defense instructor. Seino competed in three Judo World Championships.
