= Edith Simon (judoka) =

Austrian judoka (born 1961)

Personal information
- Born: 24 August 1961 (age 64)
- Occupation: Judoka

Sport
- Sport: Judo
- Rank: 4th dan black belt
- Club: JGV Schuh Ski

Achievements and titles
- World Champ.: (1980)
- European Champ.: (gold) (1982, 1982)
Medal record
Women's judo
Representing Austria
World Championships
Gold medal – first place	1980 New York City	‍–‍66 kg
European Championships
Gold medal – first place	1982 Oslo	‍–‍66 kg
Gold medal – first place	1982 Oslo	open
Bronze medal – third place	1980 Udine	‍–‍66 kg

Profile at external databases
- IJF: 61753
- JudoInside.com: 5695

Edith Simon (born August 24, 1961 in Vienna) is a former Austrian judoka. She holds the 4th Dan.

== Judo career ==
Edith Simon competed for the JGV Schuh Ski. In 1980, she won the title in the -66 kg class at the first women's World Championship in New York City. After finishing third at the 1981 European Championship, she became double European champion in 1982, when she won the title in both her weight class up to 66 kg and in the all-category category. Due to a cruciate ligament injury, this was her last competition.

== Results ==
- 1st place World Championship 1980 New York up to 66 kg
- 1st place European Championship 1982 Oslo up to 66 kg
- 1st place European Championship 1982 Oslo all category
- 3rd place European Championship 1981 Madrid up to 66 kg
- Austrian champion

== Awards ==
- 2018: Honorary member of the Vienna Judo Association
