= Juan Marin (judoka) =

Puerto Rican judoka

Personal information
- Nationality: Puerto Rican
- Born: 25 August 1952 (age 73)

Sport
- Sport: Judo

Juan Marin (born 25 August 1952) is a Puerto Rican judoka. He competed in the men's half-heavyweight event at the 1972 Summer Olympics.
