= Barry Johnson (judoka) =

Australian judoka

Personal information
- Full name: Barry John Allen Johnson
- Nationality: Australian
- Born: 30 October 1947 (age 78)

Sport
- Sport: Judo
- Weight class: Heavyweight; Light heavyweight

Barry John Allen Johnson (born 30 October 1947) was an Australian judoka. He competed in the men's half-heavyweight event at the 1972 Summer Olympics. He was defeated by Fumio Sasahara in the event's round of 32.

In 1976, Johnson was the NSW light heavyweight champion in judo.

The Australasian Martial Arts Hall of Fame website reported Johnson to have died in late 2024 or early 2025. The website removed their claim to Johnson's death in August 2025.
