= Andrés Fernández =

Andrés Fernández may refer to:

- Andrés Fernandez de Ipenza (died 1643), Spanish Roman Catholic prelate
- Andrés Fernández Pacheco, 10th Duke of Escalona (1710–1746), Spanish aristocrat and academic
- Andrés Fernández (footballer, born August 1986), Uruguayan football defender
- Andrés Fernández (footballer, born December 1986), Spanish football goalkeeper

== See also ==
- Andre Fernandez (born 1968), American president of CBS Radio
- Andrea Fernández (disambiguation)
