= Roberto Solórzano =

Costa Rican judoka

Personal information
- Born: 26 April 1945; Alajuela, Costa Rica
- Died: 30 January 2022 (aged 76)

Sport
- Sport: Judo

Roberto Solórzano (26 April 1945 – 30 January 2022) was a Costa Rican judoka. He competed in the men's half-heavyweight event at the 1972 Summer Olympics.
