= Paulette Fouillet =

French judoka (1950–2015)

Personal information
- Nickname: Grand Dame
- Born: Paulette Madeleine Georgette Louise Fouillet; 30 June 1950 Angers, France
- Died: 29 July 2015 (aged 65) Saint-Jean-de-Linières, France
- Home town: Chambellay, France
- Occupation: Judoka

Sport
- Country: France
- Sport: Judo
- Retired: 1980
Medal record
Judo
Representing France
World Championships
Silver medal – second place	1980 New York City	+72kg
Silver medal – second place	1980 New York City	open
European Championships
Gold medal – first place	1975 Munich	-66kg
Gold medal – first place	1975 Munich	open
Gold medal – first place	1976 Vienna	-66kg
Silver medal – second place	1980 Udine	+72kg
Bronze medal – third place	1978 Cologne	-66kg
Bronze medal – third place	1980 Udine	open

Profile at external databases
- IJF: 61743
- JudoInside.com: 5117

Paulette Madeleine Georgette Louise Fouillet (30 June 1950 - 29 July 2015) was a French judoka who competed in international elite events. She was a double World silver medalist, triple European champion and four-time French national champion.

Fouillet died of a short illness aged 65 on 29 July 2015.
