= Jane Bridge =

British judoka

Personal information
- Nationality: British (English)
- Born: 4 February 1960 (age 66) England
- Occupation: Judo coach

Sport
- Country: Great Britain
- Sport: Judo
- Weight class: ‍–‍48 kg
- Rank: 8th dan black belt

Achievements and titles
- World Champ.: (1980)
- European Champ.: (gold) (1976, 1978, 1980)
Medal record
Women's judo
Representing Great Britain
World Championships
Gold medal – first place	1980 New York	-48 kg
European Championships
Gold medal – first place	1976 Vienna	-48 kg
Gold medal – first place	1978 Cologne	-48 kg
Gold medal – first place	1980 Udine	-48 kg

Profile at external databases
- JudoInside.com: 4903

Jane Bridge (born 4 February 1960) is a British retired judoka and judo coach.

== Judo career ==
Bridge came to prominence winning the gold medal at the 1976 European Judo Championships in Vienna. The following year in 1977, she became champion of Great Britain for the second time, winning the bantamweight division at the British Judo Championships. She had first won the title in 1975.

In 1978, she won her second European Judo Championships gold medal, after winning the –‍48kg category at the women's 1978 European Championships in Cologne. In 1980, she won her third Eureopean Championship gold. The same year Bridge won a gold medal at the inaugural women's 1980 World Judo Championships in New York. She defeated Anna de Novellis in the final of the –‍48kg category.

In 1982, she won a third British Championship at bantamweight.

== Coaching ==
From 1993 to 1997 she coached the British women's judo team and taught Performance Judo at the University of Bath. In 2016, Bridge began working with the European Judo Union as Vice President for Education. In 2022, she started working for the Swedish Judo Federation as sporting director. She also started coaching Tara Babulfath, who won bronze at the 2024 Summer Olympics in the Women's 48 kg weight class.

== Other ==
After retiring from judo she lived in Paris and was once a bodyguard to Sylvester Stallone and Alain Delon.
