= Epigmenio Exiga =

Mexican judoka

Personal information
- Nationality: Mexican
- Born: 28 March 1950 (age 74)

Sport
- Sport: Judo

Epigmenio Exiga (born 28 March 1950) is a Mexican judoka. He competed in the men's half-heavyweight event at the 1972 Summer Olympics.
