= Jan Bosman =

Dutch judoka

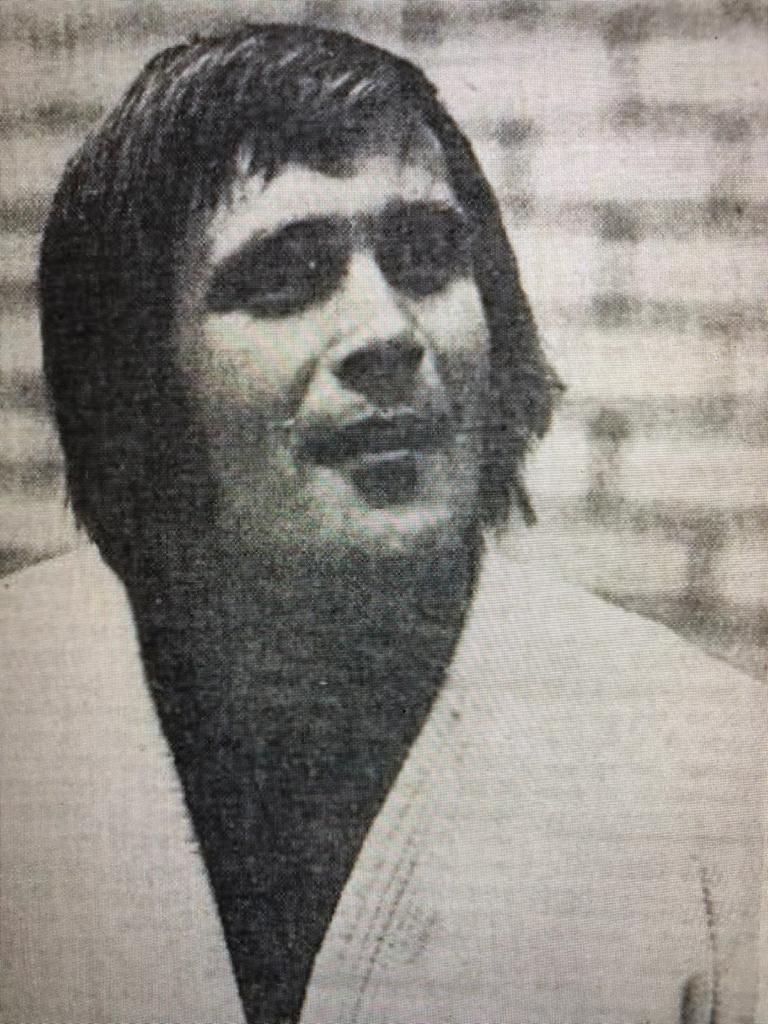

Personal information
- Nationality: Dutch
- Born: 27 November 1945; Amsterdam, Netherlands
- Died: 28 September 1992 (aged 46); Amsterdam, Netherlands

Sport
- Sport: Judo

Jan Bosman (27 November 1945 – 28 September 1992) was a Dutch judoka. He competed in the men's half-heavyweight event at the 1972 Summer Olympics.
