= Aaron Cohen (judoka) =

American judoka (born 1981)

Personal information
- Full name: Aaron Cohen
- Born: September 28, 1981 (age 44)
- Occupation: Judoka

Sport
- Sport: Judo
Medal record
Men's judo
Representing United States
Maccabiah Games
Bronze medal – third place	2009 Israel

Profile at external databases
- JudoInside.com: 12249

Aaron Cohen (born September 28, 1981) is an American former judoka. He was a 5-time US national champion (2004, 2005, 2006, 2008, and 2009), and earned a silver medal in the 2008 US Olympic trials. He earned a bronze medal at the 2009 Maccabiah Games in Israel.

== Biography ==
He is the son of Irwin Cohen, a former Olympian, is Jewish, and lives in Buffalo Grove, Illinois. Aaron's uncle Steve Cohen is a former Olympic competitor and coach, and his brother Richard also competed at the national level.

He trained at the New York Athletic Club.

He was a 5-time US national champion (2004, 2005, 2006, 2008, and 2009), and placed second 4 times, and third once. He earned a silver medal in the 2008 US Olympic trials.

Aaron Cohen won silver at the 2003 Pan American Championships, and bronze at the 2000, 2005, 2006, and 2007 Pan American Judo Championships. He also competed in four Judo World Championships.

Cohen competed for Team USA at the 2009 Maccabiah Games in Israel, earning a bronze medal.

Cohen is currently a coach at Deerfield High School in Deerfield, Illinois.

== See also ==
- List of select Jewish judokas
