= Massao Shinohara =

Brazilian judoka

Massao Shinohara (1925 – 2020) was a judoka from Brazil. Massao is considered to be a pioneer of Judo in Brazil. In 2017 he was the only 10th Dan in Judo in Brazil. At the age of 15, Massao began practicing Judo. Massao was the coach of the 1984 Judo Olympic Team for Brazil. He coached numerous individuals including his son, the future Judo National Team of Brazil Coach Luiz Shinohara. He died at the age of 95 in 2020.
