= 1973 Maccabiah Games =

9th Maccabiah
- Host city: Tel Aviv, Israel
- Nations: 27
- Debuting countries: Costa Rica; Spain
- Athletes: 1,800
- Events: 20 branches of sport
- Opening: July 9, 1973
- Closing: July 19, 1973
- Opened by: President Ephraim Katzir
- Torchbearer: Tal Brody
- Main venue: Ramat Gan Stadium

The 9th Maccabiah Games, which were held from July 9 to 19, 1973, were opened in Ramat Gan Stadium, Israel. Spain and Costa Rica made their debuts in the Games. A total of 1,800 athletes competed on behalf of 27 countries in 20 branches of sport, in 30 venues across Israel. The Games took place ten months after the 1972 Summer Olympics in Munich, where 11 Israeli athletes and coaches were slain during the Munich Massacre. The United States won 76 gold medals (and 162 total medals), and Israel was next with 60 gold medals (and 166 total medals).

== History ==
The Maccabiah Games were first held in 1932. In 1961, they were declared a "Regional Sports Event" by, and under the auspices and supervision of, the International Olympic Committee. Among other Olympic and world champions, swimmer Mark Spitz won 10 Maccabiah gold medals before earning his first of nine Olympic gold medals.

== Opening ceremonies ==
60,000 spectators packed Ramat Gan Stadium for the Opening Ceremonies on July 9, 1973, as Israeli Prime Minister Golda Meir, Israeli President Ephraim Katzir, and Israeli Minister Minister of Foreign Affairs Abba Eban paid homage to the slain athletes. The Maccabiah torch had been carried 30 miles to the stadium by a relay of runners from Modi'in in Israel, which is believed to be the burial place of the Maccabees, Jewish warriors of the 2nd century BC in whose memory the Games are named. Those in the stadium rose for a memorial prayer, inspired by the Biblical text of King David's lament for Jonathan and Saul. The prayer said: "They were swifter than eagles and stronger than lions when coming to represent Israel before the nations and peoples of the world." 11 candle-shaped torches at the top of the stands were kindled one by one, as the name of each victim was mentioned, and the large crowd was hushed as each torch was lit.

The honor of lighting the torch over the stadium was given to basketball player Tal Brody, who had played for Team USA as an American in the 1965 Maccabiah Games, and subsequently moved to Israel, where he became captain of the basketball team. Israeli jumper and basketball player Tamara Metal was chosen as torch bearer, but Metal recited the Vow of the Maccabiah Games instead because she was pregnant.

== Notable competitors ==
In swimming, Olympian Anita Zarnowiecki from Sweden, 19 years of age, won seven gold medals (including the 100 m backstroke, the 400 m freestyle, and the 200 m individual medley) and one silver medal (in the 800 m freestyle), surpassing American Olympian Mark Spitz's record of five gold medals in the 1969 Maccabiah Games. American future Olympic medalist Wendy Weinberg won four gold medals, including in the women's 200 m butterfly, the women's 400 m medley, and the women's 800 m freestyle. Swedish Olympian Bernt Zarnowiecki, Anita's twin brother, won three gold medals in swimming, including in the men's 400 m freestyle and the 1,500 m freestyle. American future Pan American Games champion Barbara Weinstein won a gold medal in three metre diving. Mexican Olympian Roberto Strauss won three bronze medals in freestyle.

In track and field, Israeli Olympian and world record holder Shaul Ladany, who had competed at the 1972 Summer Olympics (the Olympics of the Munich massacre), won the 20-km and 50-km walks. Israeli Asian Games champion and Olympian Esther Roth, who withdrew from the 1972 Olympics after the Munich Massacre, won the 100 m race in 11.75, as well as the 200 m and the 100 m hurdles. Maya Kalle-Bentzur of Israel, a future Olympian, was also a medalist at the Games.

In basketball, 18-year-old Ernie Grunfeld, who three years later won an Olympic gold medal, was the only high school student on the American team's starting five, and led the team in scoring with a 20-point average as the US was coached by Hall of Famer Harry Litwack and took the silver medal. Grunfeld later played in the NBA, and became General Manager of the New York Knicks.

In tennis, South African Ilana Kloss—a future world #1 women's doubles player—won gold medals in women's singles (defeating American Janet Haas in the finals), women's doubles (with Helen Weiner defeating silver medalists Vicki Berner and Pam Gullish of Canada in the finals), and mixed doubles. David Schneider won three gold medals, in the men's singles, doubles with Errol Kilov, and mixed doubles with Ilana Kloss.

In judo, American Olympian Irwin Cohen won the light-heavyweight gold medal, defeating Canadian Olympian Terry Farnsworth who won the silver medal. Irwin's brother, American future Olympian Steve Cohen, won a gold medal in judo at 176 pounds. American Bernard Lepkofker won a gold medal in the heavyweight competition. Israeli future Olympian Yona Melnik won a gold medal at 154 pounds. Canadian future Olympian Howard Stupp won a silver medal.

In soccer, Vicky Peretz played for Israel, which won the gold medal over Mexico. Yoram Kessel played for Israel in cricket. Canada's Olympian Peter Bakonyi competed in fencing.

The organizers of the Games invited two non-Jewish Dutch athletes, who in sympathy with the Israelis had withdrawn from the Munich Olympics after the murders. Wilma van Gool, who had qualified for the semifinals in the sprints at Munich, raced as a pacer—not as a competitor, and Bert Kops, a heavyweight wrestler, appeared in an exhibition match.

== National delegations ==
A total of 27 nations sent delegations of athletes to the Games. The United States delegation consisted of 263 athletes, and was the second-largest after Israel. South African track and field, wrestling, and weight-lifting teams did not participate, because international federations in those sports had imposed bans on the athletes, but the South African delegation of 150 athletes was the third-largest delegation. Canada had 56 athletes. Rhodesia had a delegation of 21 athletes. A total of 27 former Soviet Jews who had immigrated to Israel competed, with their strengths being in wrestling, weight lifting, boxing, fencing, and tennis, and pole vault.

The United States won 76 gold medals (and 162 total medals), and Israel was next with 60 gold medals (and 166 total medals). They were followed by South Africa, Great Britain, and France.
