= Patrick Murphy (judoka) =

Irish judoka

Personal information
- Nationality: Irish
- Born: 9 January 1944 (age 81)

Sport
- Sport: Judo

Patrick Murphy (born 9 January 1944) is an Irish judoka. He competed in the men's half-heavyweight event at the 1972 Summer Olympics.
