= Andrea Hernández =

Andrea Hernández may refer to:

- Andrea Confesora Hernández (born 1967), Dominican judoka
- Andrea Hernández Fitzner (born 1982), Mexican politician
- Andrea Hernández (footballer) (born 1998), Mexican footballer
- Andrea Hernández (taekwondo), Bolivian competitor at the 2017 World Taekwondo Championships – Women's bantamweight

== See also ==
- Andrea Fernández (disambiguation)
