= Rubens Galaxe =

Brazilian footballer

Personal information
- Full name: Rubens Márcio Cordeiro Galaxe
- Date of birth: 29 April 1952 (age 74)
- Place of birth: Rio de Janeiro, Brazil
- Height: 1.70 m (5 ft 7 in)
- Position: Midfielder

Senior career*
Years	Team	Apps	(Gls)
1971–1982	Fluminense		
1974	→ Millonarios (loan)		
1983	São Cristóvão		
1985	Goytacaz		

International career
1971–1972	Brazil Olympic	9	(0)

Managerial career
- 1989: Fluminense
- 1994: Remo
- * Club domestic league appearances and goals

Rubens Márcio Cordeiro Galaxe (born 29 April 1952) is a Brazilian former football player and manager who played as a midfielder. He competed in the men's tournament at the 1972 Summer Olympics.
