= Vitor (footballer, born 1953) =

Brazilian footballer

Vitor de Paula Braga
Personal information
- Full name: Vitor de Paula Oliveira Braga
- Date of birth: 21 November 1953 (age 72)
- Place of birth: Pedro Leopoldo, Brazil
- Position: Goalkeeper

Senior career*
Years	Team	Apps	(Gls)
1972–1974	Cruzeiro	28	(0)
1977–1979	Santos		
1982–1984	Cruzeiro	25	(0)

International career
1972	Brazil Olympic	3	(0)
- * Club domestic league appearances and goals

Vitor de Paula Braga (born 21 November 1953), known as Vitor, is a Brazilian former professional footballer who played as a goalkeeper at Cruzeiro and Santos FC.
