= Eduard Aellig =

Austrian Olympic judoka (born 1948)

Personal information
- Nationality: Austria
- Born: 11 January 1948 (age 77)
- Height: 1.81 m (5 ft 11 in)
- Weight: 93 kg (205 lb)

Sport
- Sport: Judo

Eduard Aellig (born 11 January 1948) is an Austrian judoka. He competed in the 1972 Summer Olympics.
