= Pedrinho Gaúcho =

Brazilian footballer (1953–2019)

Personal information
- Full name: Pedro Antônio Simeão
- Date of birth: 4 August 1953
- Place of birth: Lajeado, Rio Grande do Sul, Brazil
- Date of death: 19 June 2019 (aged 65)
- Height: 1.73 m (5 ft 8 in)
- Position: Forward

International career
Years	Team	Apps	(Gls)
- Brazil Olympic

Pedro Antônio Simeão (4 August 1953–19 June 2019), known as Pedrinho Gaúcho, was a Brazilian footballer who played as a forward. He competed in the men's tournament at the 1972 Summer Olympics.
