= Andre Fernandez =

Andre John Fernandez (born August 26, 1968) is the current president of CBS Radio. He was previously President and Chief Operating Officer of Journal Communications, now Journal Media Group, where he began as Chief Financial Officer in 2008. Prior to that time, Fernandez served in various roles at General Electric, United Technologies, Merrill Lynch, and Brown Brothers Harriman.

Radio Ink named Andre Fernandez as the second most powerful person in radio in August 2016.
