= Mohamed Dione =

Senegalese judoka

Personal information
- Nationality: Senegalese
- Born: 25 May 1948 (age 77)

Sport
- Sport: Judo

Mohamed Dione (born 25 May 1948) is a Senegalese former judoka. He competed in the men's half-heavyweight event at the 1972 Summer Olympics.
