= Andrea Confesora Hernández =

Dominican judoka (born 1967)

Personal information
- Born: Andrea Confesora Hernández Peralta; 10 January 1967 (age 59) La Vega, Dominican Republic
Medal record
Women's Judo
Representing Dominican Republic
Central American and Caribbean Games
| Gold medal – first place | 1986 Santiago | -72 kg |
| Silver medal – second place | 1998 Maracaibo | +72 kg |
Pan American Games
| Silver medal – second place | 1987 Indianapolis | Middleweight |

Andrea Confesora Hernández Peralta (Note: In this Spanish name, the first or paternal surname is Hernández and the second or maternal family name is Peralta.) (born 10 January 1967) is a Dominican judoka.

== Early years ==
Andrea Confesora Hernández was born in La Vega on 10 January 1967, the fifth of six children of Ramón María Hernández and María Peralta Carmona. She completed her primary studies at the Ramón del Orbe School, and secondary at Liceo Don Pepe Álvarez. She later earned a licentiate in physical education.

== Career ==
Hernández was selected to represent her country in judo at the 1986 Central American and Caribbean Games in Santiago. There, she took the gold medal in the -72 kg category, winning her final bout again Idania Hernández of Cuba. Venezuelan Anny Hernández finished third.

She won a silver medal in the middleweight (-66 kg) category at the 1987 Pan American Games in Indianapolis, finishing behind Sandra Greaves of Canada and ahead of Christine Penick of the United States and Marcia Quiñónez of Ecuador. She became the first Dominican woman medalist in the event.

For her achievements, Hernández was selected as the Athlete of the Year at the national level, becoming the first woman to obtain the recognition. She would go on to receive it again in 1987 and 1988.

The Dominican judo team did not select Hernández to compete at the 1988 Summer Olympics in Seoul. Despondent, she decided to retire while at the peak of her career. She moved to the United States, where she began her professional studies, and had two children. After seven years, she decided to move back to the Dominican Republic. She was given the responsibility of carrying the torch at a sporting event, and this inspired her to return to judo. At age 27, she rejoined the national team.

She won a gold medal in the +72 kg category at the 3rd Central American and Caribbean Judo Championship in 1997. The following year, she took the silver medal at the 1998 Central American and Caribbean Games in Maracaibo.

Hernández formally retired in 1999, after her father fell ill. She later joined the Judo Association of the Province of La Vega, and taught physical education at Liceo Don Pepe Álvarez.

== Awards and recognition ==
- 2006: La Vega Athlete Hall of Fame
- 2012: Dominican Republic Martial Arts Hall of Fame
- 2014: Dominican Sports Hall of Fame
- 2017: Panamerican Judo Hall of Fame
