= Nielsen Elias =

Brazilian footballer

Personal information
- Date of birth: 19 June 1952 (age 74)
- Place of birth: Rio de Janeiro, Brazil
- Position: Goalkeeper

International career
Years	Team	Apps	(Gls)
1972	Brazil Olympic		

Nielsen Elias (born 19 June 1952) is a Brazilian former footballer who played as a goalkeeper. He competed in the men's tournament at the 1972 Summer Olympics.
