= Cecilia Alacán =

Cuban judoka (born 1966)

Personal information
- Full name: Cecilia Alacán Garcia
- Citizenship: Cuban

Sport
- Country: Cuba
- Sport: Judo

Achievements and titles
- Regional finals: 1983, 1987
Medal record
Representing Cuba
Pan American Games
Bronze medal – third place	1983 Caracas	U52
Gold medal – first place	1987 Indianapolis	U56
Pan American Judo Championships
Gold medal – first place	1984 Mexico City	U52
Gold medal – first place	1986 Puerto Rico	U56
Gold medal – first place	1988 Buenos Aires	U56

Cecilia Alacán Garcia (born 22 November 1966) is a Cuban former judoka, who won three gold medals at the Pan American Judo Championships and two medals at the Pan American Games.

== Career ==
Alacán won a bronze medal at the 1983 Pan American Games in the U52 event. In 1984, she won the U52 event at the Pan American Judo Championships in Mexico City. She won the U56 event in 1986 and 1988, in Puerto Rico and Buenos Aires. Alacán also won the gold medal in the U56 event at the 1987 Pan American Games. She came joint fifth in the U56 event at the 1987 World Judo Championships.
