= Luis Shinohara =

Brazilian judoka (born 1954)

Medal record

Men's judo

Representing Brazil

Pan American Games
| Gold medal – first place | 1979 San Juan | Bantamweight |
| Silver medal – second place | 1983 Caracas | Bantamweight |
| Bronze medal – third place | 1975 Mexico City | Featherweight |

Luis Juniti Shinohara (born August 29, 1954) is a retired judoka from Brazil, who won a total number of three medals at the Pan American Games during his career. He also competed at the 1980 Summer Olympics and the 1984 Summer Olympics.

He coaches Olympic medalist judoka Felipe Kitadai. His father is Brazilian-Japanese Judo pioneer, Massao Shinohara.
