= Allen Coage =

American-Canadian judoka and professional wrestler (1943–2007)

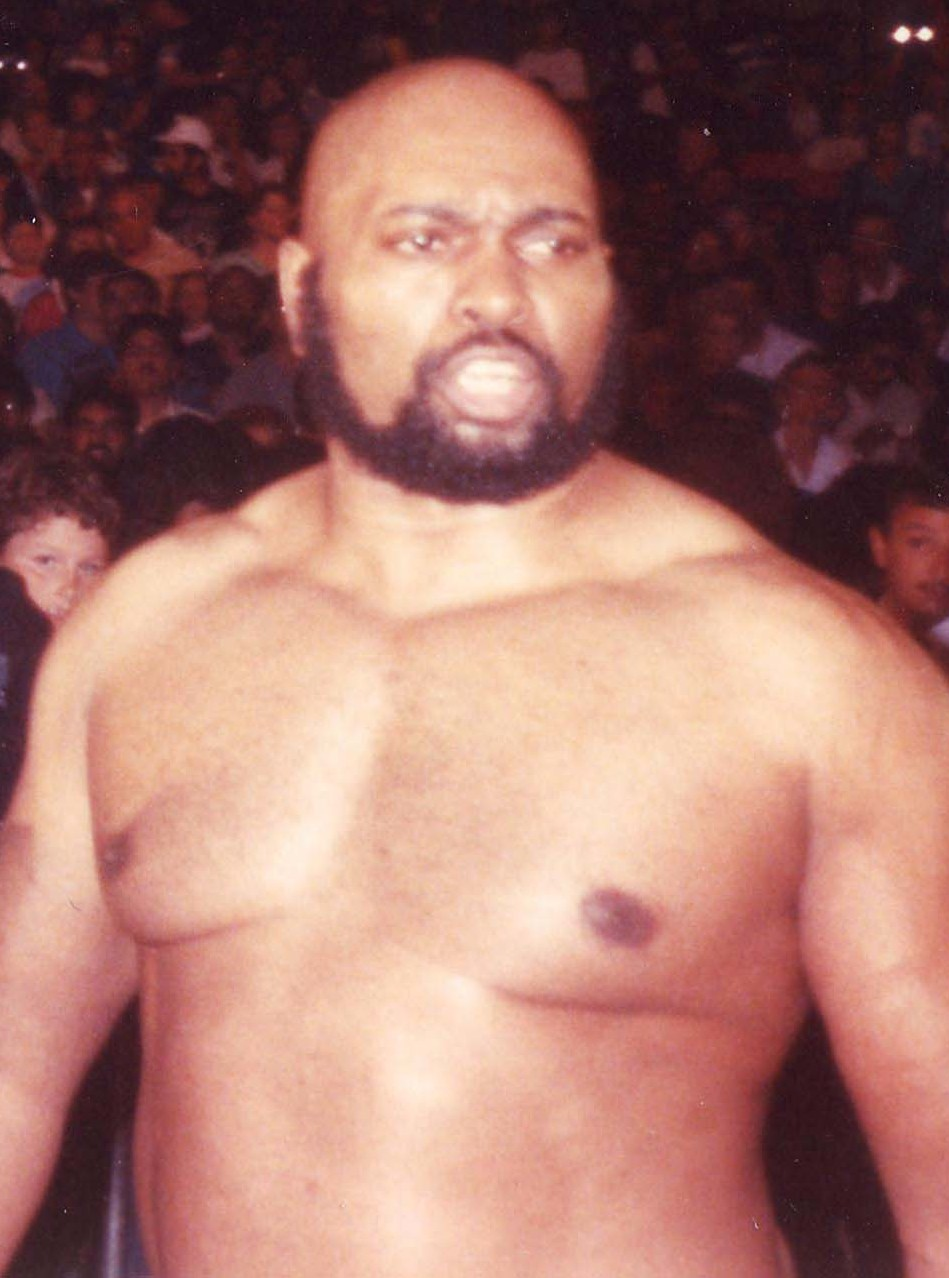
- Coage in 1989

Personal information
- Born: Allen James Coage; October 22, 1943 New York City, U.S.
- Died: March 6, 2007 (aged 63) Calgary, Alberta, Canada
- Cause of death: Heart attack
- Education: Nihon University
- Spouse: Helen Coage (1983–2007; his death)
- Children: 9

Professional wrestling career
- Ring name(s): Allen Coage; Bad News; Bad News Allen; Bad News Brown; B.L. Brown; Buffalo Allen
- Billed height: 6 ft 2 in (188 cm)
- Billed weight: 271 lb (123 kg)
- Billed from: Harlem, New York; Tokyo, Japan (WWWF 1978–79)
- Trained by: Antonio Inoki; Kotetsu Yamamoto
- Debut: October 25, 1977
- Retired: May 10, 1999
- Judo career
- Weight class: +93 kg
- Rank: 3rd dan black belt

Judo achievements and titles
- Olympic Games: (bronze) (1976)
- World Champ.: 7th (1975)
- Pan American Champ.: (gold) (1968)
Medal record
Men's judo
Representing United States
Olympic Games
Bronze medal – third place	1976 Montreal	+93 kg
Pan American Games
Gold medal – first place	1967 Winnipeg	+93 kg
Gold medal – first place	1975 Mexico City	+93 kg
Pan American Championships
Gold medal – first place	1968 San Juan	+93 kg

Profile at external judo databases
- IJF: 54440
- JudoInside.com: 6003

Allen James Coage (October 22, 1943 – March 6, 2007) was an American judoka and professional wrestler. He won medals for the United States at several international judo competitions, including the heavyweight bronze medal at the 1976 Summer Olympics, and later appeared in professional wrestling promotions such as the World Wrestling Federation, New Japan Pro-Wrestling and Stampede Wrestling under the ring names Bad News Brown, Buffalo Allen, and Bad News Allen.

== Early life ==
Coage was born in Harlem, New York City and raised in St. Albans, Queens, attending Thomas A. Edison High School. After graduating in 1962, Coage began working in a bakery, eventually becoming a foreman.

== Judo career ==
Coage began training in judo under Jerome Mackey after seeing a poster for Mackey's dojo on the New York City Subway, at the age of 15. He began his career in 1964 at the relatively late age of 22. After seven months as a white belt, he placed first in the Chicago Invitational tournament. Coage achieved a black belt in two and a half years and after five years was named a sandan. Coage practised a "classical" style, with his favored throws being the Ōuchi gari and the Tai otoshi. Coage also studied judo and Tomiki Aikido under Kastuo Watanabe who awarded him shodan in the latter.

Coage won the Amateur Athletic Union judo championship (heavyweight class) in 1966, 1968, 1969, 1970, and 1975, as well as winning the open division in 1970. He also competed in the Pan American Games, winning gold medals in the heavyweight class in 1967 and 1975.

In 1970, Coage relocated to Japan for two years, where he studied at Nihon University, majoring and minoring in judo. In 1972, Coage suffered a severe knee injury during an Olympic Trials bout with Jimmy Wooley, rendering him unable to compete in the 1972 Summer Olympics.

Upon recovering, Coage began training for the 1976 Summer Olympics. Coage was initially excluded from the United States judo team until a class action lawsuit was filed against the United States Olympic Committee by the United States Judo Association. Coage ultimately won a bronze medal. His victory made him the first African American to win a solo Olympic Games medal in a sport other than boxing or track and field.

Coage retired from competitive judo following the 1976 Summer Olympics because of frustrations with internal politics. He went on to hold a number of other jobs, including briefly working as a bodyguard for singer Aretha Franklin, before deciding to train as a professional wrestler.

== Professional wrestling career ==
=== New Japan Pro-Wrestling (1977–1988, 1990–1992) ===
Coage began training as a professional wrestler under Antonio Inoki in the New Japan Pro-Wrestling dojo in 1977. He debuted in October 1977, briefly performing under his birth name before adopting the ring name "Buffalo Allen". Coage wrestled intermittently for NJPW over the next 15 years.

=== World Wide Wrestling Federation (1978–1979) ===
Coage made a one-off appearance in the World Wide Wrestling Federation in February 1978, defeating jobber Frank Williams at a live event under his birth name. He returned to the promotion in January 1979 and wrestled for the WWWF for the remainder of the year, appearing on several episodes of WWF Championship Wrestling.

Late in 1979, at Madison Square Garden, teaming with JoJo Andrews, Coage challenged for the NWA North American Tag Team Championship against Riki Choshu and Seiji Sakaguchi. Coage's team was unsuccessful when Andrews submitted to a Boston crab by Sakaguchi in a match that lasted just under 10 minutes.

=== NWA Hollywood (1979–1981) ===
Coage worked in Los Angeles for NWA Hollywood Wrestling where he won the NWA Americas Tag Team Championship twice with Víctor Rivera.

=== Mexico (1980-1984) ===
Coage would work in Mexico for Universal Wrestling Association.

=== Stampede Wrestling (1982–1988) ===
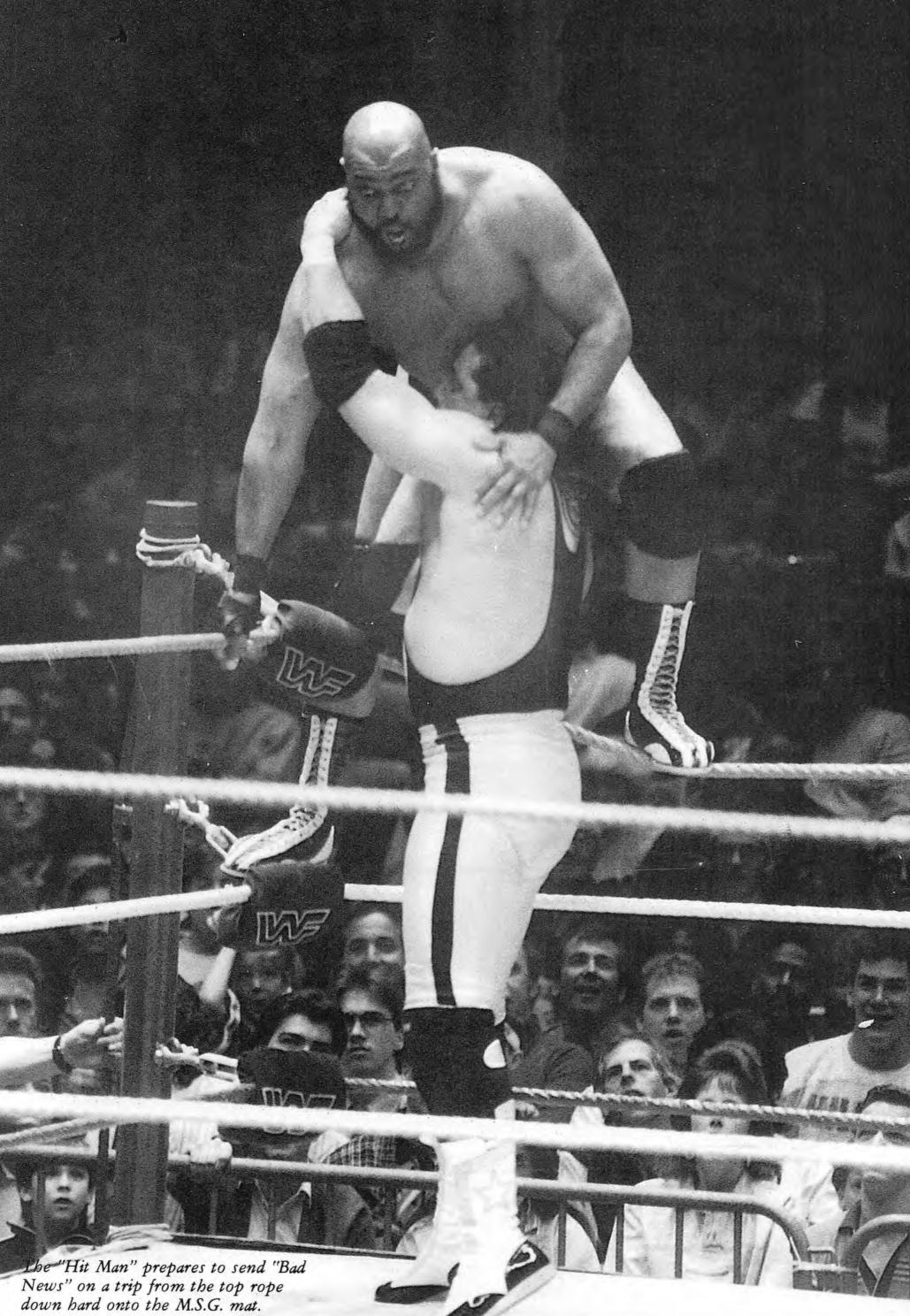
Coage (top) vs Bret Hart (bottom), circa 1988

In 1982, Bad News Allen found a long-term home in Stu Hart's Stampede Wrestling, centered in Allen's adopted home city of Calgary. Allen remained with Stampede from 1982 until 1988, with some tours of Australia and Florida during that time, and had matches with wrestlers such as the Dynamite Kid and Bret Hart.

=== Return to WWF (1988–1990) ===
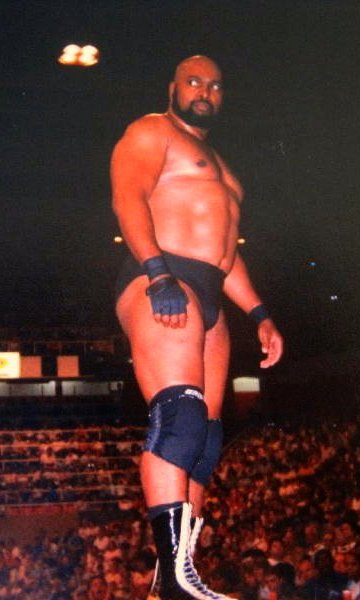
Bad News Brown in the late 1980s

Allen returned to the World Wrestling Federation in early 1988 as Bad News Brown, and it was during this time that he achieved his greatest notoriety. His trademark characteristic as Bad News Brown was never smiling—either he kept an angry face, or he "laughed loud" at the expense of opponents' misfortunes. While the roster was mostly filled with ultra-virtuous babyfaces and cowardly and monster heels, Bad News was something entirely different: a tough loner.

While other heels were likely to form alliances with one another, Bad News was reclusive. His dislike for all fellow wrestlers was clear when he abandoned his teams at the Survivor Series of 1988 and 1989. Some memorable moments from his WWF tenure included winning the battle royal at WrestleMania IV by last eliminating Bret Hart, who was then a heel, after a sneak attack. Followed by a brief feud with WWF World Heavyweight Champion "Macho Man" Randy Savage and his manager Miss Elizabeth in late 1988 that led to more main-event matches. Around this time, Brown was worked into a story where he attacked WWF president Jack Tunney on The Brother Love Show after confronting him about being denied title matches.

On the March 11, 1989 edition of Saturday Night's Main Event XX Bad News memorably took a microphone towards the end of his match with Hulk Hogan and told him that it was time for the Ghetto Blaster (an enzuigiri). As he was getting ready to execute it, however, Hogan got out of the way, leading him to miss the move and suffer an eventual loss.

Brown's next feud was with "Rowdy" Roddy Piper, starting at the 1990 Royal Rumble when he was eliminated by Piper, then illegally eliminated Piper. This led to Brown being ridiculed, which he countered by calling Piper out for wearing a "skirt". This culminated at WrestleMania VI in a match where both men were counted out. Brown was initially planned to continue this feud with Piper, but since neither man would agree to lose to each other, their program was scrapped and instead Brown was assigned to work with Jake "The Snake" Roberts, where Bad News used a sewer rat, actually a possum, against Jake's snake.

Brown eventually left the WWF after SummerSlam 1990, claiming Vince McMahon failed to live up to his promise to make him the company's first black champion, which reportedly affected him and his wife.

As written in the autobiography of the Dynamite Kid, Coage's legitimate toughness was displayed in a confrontation involving André the Giant, who allegedly made a racist comment on a tour bus for New Japan Pro-Wrestling. Coage overheard it and made the driver stop the bus, walked off and demanded the Giant get off and fight him one on one. André did not move from his seat and later apologized for the remark.

=== Later career (1990–1999) ===
Coage continued to work in independent promotions for several more years, including Japan's shoot wrestling UWFi promotion and return to Mexico's Universal Wrestling Association. In 1994, he worked in South Africa and feuded with former Stampede wrestler Gama Singh. He also worked for Tokyo Pro Wrestling from 1997 to 1998 and worked in independent shows in Calgary and Western Canada.

Coage retired in 1999 due to knee damage. He continued occasionally working independent shows for friends while living in Calgary with his wife, and had considered starting a promotion himself. Additionally, he taught wrestling with Canadian wrestling coach Leo Jean, and worked as a mall security officer in Airdrie, Alberta.

== Personal life ==
Coage was married three times. With his first wife, Audrey, he had his eldest child, Tonya. Then Coage was in a long-term relationship with Lorriane, in which he had his eldest son, Bryan, and April, and two step children—Martin and Ronda. He had another relationship with Lottie, in which he had two more children, Michael and Nancy.

Coage was then married for a second time to Katharine, in which he had Lynnette. During his last marriage until his death, Coage was married to Helen, with whom he had one son, Allen Jr. (AJ) and raised two step children, Dawn and Frances.

At one point, Rick Bognar and Coage ran a wrestling school out of Calgary, Alberta. He was working on a book about his career and other wrestling stories before his death.

== Death ==
Coage died of a heart attack on the morning of March 6, 2007, at Rockyview General Hospital in Calgary, minutes after being rushed there due to chest pain. Three weeks prior to his death, he had undergone hip replacement surgery. His wife Helen Coage attended with some of Allen's children and grandchildren at the Bad News Allen Memorial Show.

== Championships and accomplishments ==
=== Judo ===
- Amateur Athletic Union
  - Grand Champion (1970)
  - Heavyweight Champion (1966, 1968, 1969, 1970, 1975)
- Black Belt
  - Hall of Fame
- Olympic Games
  - 1976 Bronze medalist, Heavyweight
- Pan American Games
  - 1967 Gold medalist, Heavyweight
  - 1975 Gold medalist, Heavyweight

=== Professional wrestling ===
- Canadian Wrestling Hall of Fame
  - Class of 2007
- Championship Wrestling from Florida
  - NWA Florida Bahamian Championship (1 time)
  - NWA Florida Heavyweight Championship (1 time)
  - NWA Southern Heavyweight Championship (Florida version) (1 time)
- International Wrestling Alliance
  - IWA Heavyweight Championship (1 time)
- NWA Hollywood Wrestling
  - NWA Americas Tag Team Championship (3 times) – with Leroy Brown (1 time) and Víctor Rivera (2 times)
- Polynesian Pacific Championship Wrestling
  - NWA Polynesian Pacific Heavyweight Championship (1 time)
- Pro Wrestling Illustrated
  - PWI ranked him #187 of the 500 best singles wrestlers during the "PWI Years" in 2003.
- Stampede Wrestling
  - Stampede North American Heavyweight Championship (4 times)
- West Coast Championship Wrestling
  - WCCW Unified Heavyweight Championship (1 time)
- WWE
  - WWE Hall of Fame (Class of 2026)
- Other titles
  - ICW Heavyweight Championship (1 time)
