= Irwin Cohen =

American judoka

Personal information
- Full name: Irwin Lee Cohen
- Born: January 21, 1952 Chicago, Illinois, U.S.
- Died: August 27, 2012 (aged 60) Chicago, Illinois, U.S.
- Occupation: Judoka

Sport
- Sport: Judo
Medal record
Men's judo
Representing United States
Pan American Games
Silver medal – second place	1975 Mexico City	-93 kg
Maccabiah Games
Gold medal – first place	1973 Maccabiah Games	-93 kg

Profile at external databases
- JudoInside.com: 8681

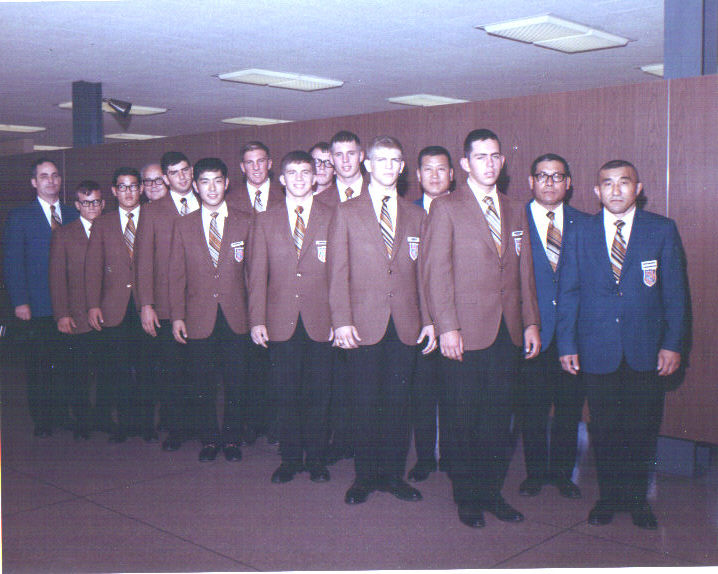
1970 USA High school Judo Team to Japan. George Wilson far left, Tommy Rigg 2nd from the left, Irwin Cohen 5th from the left, Steve Comer 8th from the left, and George Uchida on the far right.

Irwin Lee Cohen (January 21, 1952 – August 27, 2012) was an American judoka who represented the United States at the 1972 Summer Olympics in Munich, Germany. He won a gold medal at the 1973 Maccabiah Games in Israel, and a silver medal at the 1975 Pan American Games.

== Biography ==
He represented the United States at the 1972 Summer Olympics in Munich, Germany.

At the 1973 Maccabiah Games in Israel, he won the light-heavyweight gold medal, defeating Canadian Olympian Terry Farnsworth. He won silver at the 1975 Pan American Games.

Irwin Cohen's two sons Aaron and Richard were also accomplished judokas. Aaron in particular was a five-time national champion and three-time bronze medallist at the Pan American Judo Championships.

Irwin Cohen's brother Steve Cohen is a former Olympic Team competitor (1988) and Olympic coach (2000).

Irwin Cohen, who had lived in Buffalo Grove, Illinois, died on August 27, 2012, from amyloidosis and myelodysplastic syndromes.
