= Steve Cohen (judoka) =

American judoka (born 1955)

Personal information
- Full name: Steven Jay Cohen
- Born: August 29, 1955 (age 70) Chicago, Illinois, U.S.
Medal record
Men's Judo
Representing United States
Pan American Games
| Bronze medal – third place | 1975 Mexico City | Middleweight (-80 kg) |
Maccabiah Games
| Gold medal – first place | 1973 Israel | 176 pounds |

Steven Jay "Steve" Cohen (born August 29, 1955) is an American former Olympic judoka and Olympic coach. He won the US National Judo Championships in 1974, 1975, 1977, 1985, and 1987. He won a gold medal at the 1973 Maccabiah Games, a bronze medal at the 1975 Pan American Games, and a silver medal at the 1986 Goodwill Games.

== Early and personal life ==
Cohen was born in Chicago, Illinois, and is Jewish. He taught judo at his own club, and became CEO of food ingredient company Z-Trim Holdings. He lives in Grayslake, Illinois. Cohen's brother Irwin Cohen and two nephews Aaron Cohen and Richard are all accomplished judoka.

== Judo career ==
Cohen is a 7th-degree black belt.

He won a gold medal at the 1973 Maccabiah Games in Israel in judo, at 176 pounds.

He won the US National Judo Championships in 1974 (U93), 1975 (U80), 1977 (U78), 1985 (O95), and 1987 (O95).

Cohen won the bronze medal in the -80 kg division at the 1975 Pan American Games.

In 1986 he won a silver medal at the Goodwill Games as a heavyweight.

He came out of retirement and competed as a member of the 1988 Olympic Judo team for the United States as a heavyweight at 33 years of age, and came in 13th. He competed in the 95 kg division.

== Coaching career ==
He was the coach of the Olympic team in 2000.

He now coaches judo. Among his students have been five-time US champion Aaron Cohen, three-time Olympian and Pam American Games bronze medalist Colleen Rosensteel, two-time Olympian and Pan American Games bronze medalist Martin Boonzaayer, junior world champion and two-time Olympian Hillary Wolf, and Olympic silver medalist Robert Berland.
