= Patrick Mascarenhas =

Brazilian sailor

Patrick Mascarenhas (born 7 December 1953 in Rio de Janeiro) is a Brazilian sailor who competed in the 1972 Summer Olympics.
