= Judo at the 1967 Pan American Games =

Judo Judo at the 1967 Pan American Games
- Location: Winnipeg, Manitoba, Canada
- Dates: 23 July – 13 August 1967

Competition at external databases
- Links: JudoInside

The following is the results from the Judo Competition at the 1967 Pan American Games, held from July 23 to August 6, 1967 in Winnipeg, Manitoba, Canada. The men's-only competition was organized into six weight divisions.

== Men's competition ==
=== Men's Featherweight (-63 kg) ===
RANK	NAME JUDOKA
	Akira Ono (BRA)
	Patrick Bolger (CAN)
	Larry Fukuhara (USA)
	Luis Teodoro Gastón (CUB)

=== Men's Lightweight (-70 kg) ===
RANK	NAME JUDOKA
	Takeshi Miura (BRA)
	Toshiyuki Seino (USA)
	René Arredondo (MEX)
	Ibrahim Torres (CUB)

=== Men's Middleweight (-80 kg) ===
RANK	NAME JUDOKA
	Hayward Nishioka (USA)
	Lhofei Shiozawa (BRA)
	Gordon Buttle (CAN)
	Gabriel Goldschmied (MEX)

=== Men's Light Heavyweight (-93 kg) ===
RANK	NAME JUDOKA
	Michael Johnson (CAN)
	Rodolfo Pérez (ARG)
	William Paul (USA)
	Rolando Sánchez (CUB)

=== Men's Heavyweight (+93 kg) ===
RANK	NAME JUDOKA
	Allen Coage (USA)
	Douglas Rogers (CAN)
	Euladio Nicolaas (AHO)
	José Luis Turletto (ARG)

=== Men's Open ===
RANK	NAME JUDOKA
	Douglas Rogers (CAN)
	James Westbrook (USA)
	Humberto Medina (CUB)
	Georges Mehdi (BRA)

== Medal table ==
Rank	Nation	Gold	Silver	Bronze	Total
1	United States (USA)	2	2	2	6
2	Canada (CAN)	2	2	1	5
3	Brazil (BRA)	2	1	1	4
4	Argentina (ARG)	0	1	1	2
5	Cuba (CUB)	0	0	4	4
6	Mexico (MEX)	0	0	2	2
7	Netherlands Antilles (AHO)	0	0	1	1
Totals (7 entries)		6	6	12	24
