= Mary Lewis Nicotera =

American judoka

Mary Lewis Nicotera is a retired American judoka. She won a bronze medal winner in the 48 kg. division at the 1980 World Judo Championships. This was the first women's judo world championship event. She was one of the first American medal winners at a judo world championships. At the U.S. national championships, she finished first 4 times, second 3 times, and third 2 times.
