= Washington (footballer, born 1953) =

Brazilian footballer

Washington Luiz de Paula (23 January 1953 – 15 February 2010), known as Washington, was a Brazilian footballer who played as forward.

== Career ==
Born in Bauru, Washington was a standout youth player who was compared to Pelé after his performance for the Brazilian national youth team in a 1972 tournament in Cannes. His professional career did not match this early success, but he played for the Brazil national Olympic team in 1972, and for a number of professional teams including Corinthians and Guarani.
