= Chris Preobrazenski =

Canadian judoka

Personal information
- Born: November 1, 1951 Toronto, Ontario, Canada
- Died: July 26, 2023 (aged 71)
- Occupation: Judoka
- Weight: 207 lb (94 kg) (Note: Preobrazenski weighed about 207 pounds in 1976)

Sport
- Country: Canada (Note: Preobrazenski was Canada's heavyweight judo champion in 1975)
- Sport: Judo
Medal record
Representing Canada
Pan American Games
Judo
Bronze medal – third place	1975 Mexico City	-93 kg
Bronze medal – third place	1975 Mexico City	Open

Profile at external databases
- JudoInside.com: 9960

Chris Preobrazenski (November 1, 1951 – July 26, 2023) was a Canadian judoka.

== Life and career ==
Preobrazenski was born in Toronto. He was a criminal defense attorney.

Preobrazenski represented Canada at the 1975 Pan American Games, winning two bronze medals in judo.

Preobrazenski died on July 26, 2023, at the age of 71.

== See also ==
- Judo in Canada
- List of Canadian judoka
