= José Marcelino =

Brazilian volleyball player (1950–2022)

Personal information
- Born: 8 April 1950; Santos, Brazil
- Died: 14 September 2022 (aged 72); Santos, Brazil

Sport
- Sport: Volleyball

José Marcelino (8 April 1950 – 14 September 2022) was a Brazilian volleyball player. He competed in the men's tournament at the 1972 Summer Olympics.
