= José Ibáñez Gómez =

Cuban judoka (born 1951)

José Ibañez
Personal information
- Full name: José Ibañez Gómez
- Born: September 28, 1951 (age 74)
- Died: 17 December 2024
Medal record
Men's judo
Representing Cuba
Pan American Games
Gold medal – first place	1975 Mexico City	Open Class
Gold medal – first place	1979 San Juan	Heavyweight
Silver medal – second place	1975 Mexico City	Heavyweight
Bronze medal – third place	1979 San Juan	Open Class

José Ibañez Gómez (born September 28, 1951 died 17 December 2024) was a retired competitive judoka from Cuba, who represented his native country at two consecutive Summer Olympics, starting in 1972 in Munich, West Germany, where he was defeated by Canadian Terry Farnsworth, and came in 13th. He won the silver medal at the 1975 Pan American Games in the men's heavyweight division (+ 93 kg), after a loss in the final against USA's Allen Coage. In total he gained four medals in his career at the Pan American Games. He died 17 December 2024.
