= 1980 World Judo Championships =

Judo competition

Judo 1980 Women's World Judo Championships
- Venue: Madison Square Garden
- Location: New York City, United States
- Dates: 29–30 November 1980
- Competitors: 149 from 27 nations

Competition at external databases
- Links: IJF • JudoInside

The 1980 World Judo Championships were the first edition of the women's World Judo Championships, and were held in New York, New York from 29 to 30 November 1980.

== Medal overview ==
=== Women ===
Event	Gold	Silver	Bronze
-48 kg	(United Kingdom) Jane Bridge	(Italy) Anna de Novellis	Marie-France Colignon (United States) Marie Lewis
-52 kg	(Austria) Edith Hrovat	(Japan) Kaori Yamaguchi	(France) Pascale Doger (United Kingdom) Bridgette McCarthy
-56 kg	(Austria) Gerda Winklbauer	(France) Marie-Paule Panza	(United Kingdom) Loretta Doyle (Belgium) Jeannine Meulemans
-61 kg	(Netherlands) Anita Staps	(Italy) Laura Di Toma	(Germany) Inge Berg (France) Martine Rottier
-66 kg	(Austria) Edith Simon	(United Kingdom) Dawn Netherwood	(United States) Christine Penick (France) Catherine Pierre
-72 kg	(France) Jocelyne Triadou	(Germany) Barbara Claßen	(United Kingdom) Avril Malley (Netherlands) Jolanda van Meggelen
+72 kg	(Italy) Margherita De Cal	(France) Paulette Fouillet	(Belgium) Ingrid Berghmans (Germany) Christiane Kieburg
Open	(Belgium) Ingrid Berghmans	(France) Paulette Fouillet	(Germany) Barbara Claßen (United States) Barbara Fest

=== Medal table ===
Rank	Nation	Gold	Silver	Bronze	Total
1	Austria (AUT)	3	0	0	3
2	France (FRA)	1	3	4	8
3	Italy (ITA)	1	2	0	3
4	Great Britain (GBR)	1	1	3	5
5	Belgium (BEL)	1	0	2	3
6	Netherlands (NED)	1	0	1	2
7	West Germany (FRG)	0	1	3	4
8	Japan (JPN)	0	1	0	1
9	United States (USA)	0	0	3	3
Totals (9 entries)		8	8	16	32
