= Hayward Nishioka =

American judoka

Hayward Nishioka is a Japanese-American community college physical education instructor and former judo competitor.

== Early life ==
Nishioka was born in 1942, and lived some of his early years in the Manzanar internment camp. He started to learn judo at age 13 from his step father Dan Oka.

== Career ==
Nishioka competed in Kata in the 1962 All-Japan National Championship. Nishioka won a gold medal for judo at the 1967 Pan American Games. He won five consecutive national championships from 1965 to 1970. He ranked 5th in the world in 1965 and 1967. He is a former world team member and world team coach for judo. He is known for his gripping skills and techniques.

Nishioka currently teaches Judo at Los Angeles City College. On January 13, 1987, Rorion, Royler and Rickson Gracie came to Nishioka's judo school. Nishioka, at the age of 44, demonstrated to Rickson Gracie (age 28) a number of judo throws.

One of his students was Yuji Okumoto, who is known as Chozen Toguchi in The Karate Kid Part II and Cobra Kai.

Nishioka earned a black belt in Karate under trainer Tsutomu Oshima. He is a two-time Black Belt Hall of Fame member. He is a 10th degree black belt (as of April 2024) in judo. Nishioka is a Class A-rated International Judo Federation referee.

== Media ==
In the movie, Best of the Best 2, Nishioka played the Korean, Sae-jin Kwon. He also appeared in the movie Ulterior Motives. He interviewed celebrities and author articles for Black Belt Magazine including Russia's controversial judoka. Nishioka is the author books including Training for Competition: Judo – Coaching, Strategy and the Science for Success, The Judo Textbook and Judo Heart and Soul. He made 38 instructional tapes on judo.
