= Celsinho (footballer, born 1950) =

Brazilian footballer

Personal information
- Full name: Celso Ferreira
- Date of birth: 2 October 1950
- Place of birth: São Paulo, Brazil
- Date of death: 14 January 1997 (aged 46)
- Height: 1.73 m (5 ft 8 in)
- Position: Left-back

Senior career*
Years	Team	Apps	(Gls)
1970–1975	Palmeiras		
1971	→ Portuguesa Santista (loan)		
1974	→ Santa Cruz (loan)		
1975	→ Ponte Preta (loan)		
1975–1976	Portuguesa Santista		
1976–1977	Coritiba		
1977–1979	Joinville		
1979–1980	Caxias		
1981	Operário-MS		

International career
- Brazil Olympic
- * Club domestic league appearances and goals

Celso Ferreira (2 October 1950 – 14 January 1997), also known as Celsinho, was a Brazilian footballer who played as a left-back. He competed in the men's tournament at the 1972 Summer Olympics.
