= Imre Varga (judoka) =

Hungarian judoka (1945–2011)

Personal information
- Nationality: Hungarian
- Born: 19 August 1945; Nagyszénás, Hungary
- Died: 18 September 2011 (aged 66)
- Occupation: Judoka

Sport
- Sport: Judo

Profile at external databases
- JudoInside.com: 5292

Imre Varga (19 August 1945 – 18 September 2011) was a Hungarian judoka. He competed at the 1972 (where he was defeated by Canadian Terry Farnsworth, and came in 19th), 1976, and the 1980 Summer Olympics.
