= Sérgio Waismann =

Brazilian swimmer

Personal information
- Full name: Sérgio Waismann
- Born: August 7, 1955 (age 70) Brazil
- Height: 1.85 m (6 ft 1 in)
- Weight: 70 kg (150 lb)

Sport
- Sport: Swimming
- Strokes: Freestyle
Medal record
Men's swimming
Representing Brazil

Sérgio Waismann (born August 7, 1955) is a former international butterfly swimmer from Brazil, who competed at one Summer Olympics for his native country.

At the 1972 Summer Olympics, in Munich, he finished 5th in the 4×100-metre medley (improving in 5 seconds the South American record), along with Rômulo Arantes, José Fiolo and José Aranha. He also swam the 100-metre butterfly, not reaching the finals.

Participated at the inaugural World Aquatics Championships in 1973 Belgrade, in the 200-metre butterfly race.
