= Juang Jen-wuh =

Taiwanese judoka

Personal information
- Full name: 莊 振戊, Pinyin: Zhuāng Zhèn-wù
- Nationality: Taiwanese
- Born: 20 October 1950 (age 74)

Sport
- Sport: Judo

Juang Jen-wuh (born 20 October 1950) is a Taiwanese judoka. He competed in the men's half-heavyweight event at the 1972 Summer Olympics.
