= Fumio Sasahara =

Japanese judoka

Personal information
- Nationality: Japanese
- Born: 28 March 1945 (age 79); Hokkaido, Japan

Sport
- Sport: Judo

Fumio Sasahara (笹原 富美雄, Sasahara Fumio, born 28 March 1945) is a Japanese former judoka. He competed in the men's half-heavyweight event at the 1972 Summer Olympics.
