= Gabriel Goldschmied =

Mexican judoka (born 1939)

Personal information
- Nationality: Mexican
- Born: 22 April 1939 (age 86)

Sport
- Sport: Judo

Gabriel Goldschmied (born 22 April 1939) is a Mexican judoka. He competed in the men's middleweight event at the 1964 Summer Olympics.
