= Lhofei Shiozawa =

Brazilian judoka (1941–2008)

Personal information
- Born: 10 July 1941 São Paulo, Brazil
- Died: 3 November 2008 (aged 67) Goiania, Brazil
- Occupation: Judoka
- Height: 166 cm (5 ft 5 in)
- Weight: 80 kg (176 lb)

Sport
- Sport: Judo
Medal record
Men's judo
Representing Brazil
Pan American Games
Gold medal – first place	1963 São Paulo	-80 kg
Silver medal – second place	1967 Winnipeg	-80 kg
Pan American Championships
Gold medal – first place	1968 San Juan	-80 kg
Gold medal – first place	1970 Londrina	-80 kg
Gold medal – first place	1972 Buenos Aires	-80 kg
Silver medal – second place	1972 Buenos Aires	Open

Profile at external databases
- JudoInside.com: 6763

Lhofei Shiozawa (10 July 1941 – 3 November 2008) was a Brazilian judoka. He competed at the 1964 Summer Olympics and the 1972 Summer Olympics.
