= Judo at the 1963 Pan American Games =

Judo Judo at the 1963 Pan American Games
- Location: São Paulo, Brazil
- Dates: 27 August – 7 September 1963

Competition at external databases
- Links: JudoInside

This page shows the results of the Men's Judo Competition at the 1963 Pan American Games, held from April 20 to May 5, 1963, in São Paulo, Brazil. There were a total number of four weight divisions. Judo made its first appearance at the Pan American Games. Just men were competing.

== Men's competition ==
=== Men's Lightweight (-70 kg) ===
RANK	NAME JUDOKA
	Thoshiyuki Seino (USA)
	Jorge Yamashita (BRA)
	—

=== Men's Middleweight (-80 kg) ===
RANK	NAME JUDOKA
	Lhofei Shiozawa (BRA)
	Paul Marayama (USA)
	Rómulo Etcheverry (URU)

=== Men's Heavyweight (-90 kg) ===
RANK	NAME JUDOKA
	George Harris (USA)
	Milton Lovato (BRA)
	Heraldo Viazzi (URU)

=== Men's Open ===
RANK	NAME JUDOKA
	Benjamin Campbell (USA)
	Georges Mehdi (BRA)
	Joaquín Antrate (URU)

== Medal table ==
Rank	Nation	Gold	Silver	Bronze	Total
1	United States	3	1	0	4
2	Brazil	1	3	0	4
3	Uruguay	0	0	3	3
Totals (3 entries)		4	4	3	11
