= René Arredondo (judoka) =

Mexican judoka (born 1944)

Personal information
- Full name: René Arredondo Cepeda
- Nationality: Mexican
- Born: 18 August 1944
- Died: 20 February 2024 (aged 79) Mexico City, Mexico

Sport
- Sport: Judo

René Arredondo Cepeda (18 August 1944 – 20 February 2024) was a Mexican judoka. He competed in the men's lightweight event at the 1964 Summer Olympics.

Arredondo died on 20 February 2024 in Mexico City, at the age of 79.
