= Paul Barth (judoka) =

West German judoka (1945–2026)

Personal information
- Born: 20 September 1945 Munich, Bavaria, Allied-occupied Germany
- Died: 31 August 2026 (aged 80)
- Occupation: Judoka

Sport
- Country: West Germany
- Sport: Judo
- Weight class: ‍–‍93 kg

Achievements and titles
- Olympic Games: (bronze) (1972)
- World Champ.: 5th (1969)
- European Champ.: (bronze) (1968)
Medal record
Men's judo
Representing West Germany
Olympic Games
Bronze medal – third place	1972 Munich	‍–‍93 kg
European Championships
Bronze medal – third place	1968 Lausanne	‍–‍93 kg

Profile at external databases
- IJF: 54536
- JudoInside.com: 4774
- Updated on 24 June 2023

Paul Barth (20 September 1945 – 31 August 2026) was a German judoka who competed in the 1972 Summer Olympics.

Barth died on 31 August 2026, at the age of 80.
