= George Harris (judoka) =

American judoka (1933–2011)

Personal information
- Full name: George Lee Harris
- Born: January 15, 1933 Kittrell, North Carolina, U.S.
- Died: January 7, 2011 (aged 77) Brick, New Jersey, U.S.
- Occupation: Judoka
- Height: 6 ft 2 in (188 cm)
- Weight: 220 lb (100 kg)

Sport
- Sport: Judo
Medal record
Men's judo
Representing the United States
Pan American Games
Gold medal – first place	1963 São Paulo	Heavyweight
Pan American Championships
Gold medal – first place	1958 Río de Janeiro	3 Dan
Silver medal – second place	1958 Río de Janeiro	Open

Profile at external databases
- JudoInside.com: 9947

George Lee Harris (January 15, 1933 – January 7, 2011) was a member of the first United States Olympic judo team. He was born in Kittrell, North Carolina.

He was a 10th dan in Judo. Harris began his judo career after 1952. Harris while speaking at Jack Krystek's School of Judo stated he was initially a boxer before becoming a Judoka. Harris was a gold medalist at the Pan American Games, four-time United States National Champion, and six time Air Force Champion. He also trained at the Kodokan where he earned his blackbelt.

Harris had a long involvement with military judo in the United States Air Force, and later served as president of the United States Judo Association.

He starred in the late-1970s martial-arts film, "The Year of the Gentle Tiger", a forerunner to "The Karate Kid". He also appeared on talk shows and was twice a guest on "To Tell the Truth".

== Sources ==
- Nishioka, Hayward (2000). Judo: Heart and Soul. Ohara Publications. ISBN 0-89750-137-3.
- Evans, Hilary; Gjerde, Arild; Heijmans, Jeroen; Mallon, Bill; et al. "George Harris". Olympics at Sports-Reference.com. Sports Reference LLC. Archived from the original on May 19, 2011.
