= Pavle Bajčetić =

Yugoslav judoka (born 1945)

Personal information
- Nationality: Yugoslav
- Born: 21 April 1945 (age 81)
- Occupation: Judoka

Sport
- Sport: Judo

Profile at external databases
- IJF: 54549

Pavle Bajčetić (born 21 April 1945) is a Yugoslav judoka. He competed in the men's half-heavyweight event at the 1972 Summer Olympics. He is from Novi Sad.
