= Judo at the 1975 Pan American Games =

Judo Judo at the 1975 Pan American Games
- Location: Mexico City, Mexico
- Dates: 12–26 October 1975

Competition at external databases
- Links: JudoInside

This page shows the results of the Men's Judo Competition at the 1975 Pan American Games, held from October 12 to October 26, 1975 in Mexico City, Mexico. There were a total number of six weight divisions. The judo event returned to the Pan American Games after eight years.

== Medal table ==
Rank	Nation	Gold	Silver	Bronze	Total
1	Canada (CAN)	3	0	2	5
2	Brazil (BRA)	1	2	2	5
3	Cuba (CUB)	1	2	1	4
4	United States (USA)	1	1	3	5
5	Netherlands Antilles (AHO)	0	1	0	1
6	Argentina (ARG)	0	0	1	1
6	Dominican Republic (DOM)	0	0	1	1
6	Puerto Rico (PUR)	0	0	1	1
6	Venezuela (VEN)	0	0	1	1
Totals (9 entries)		6	6	12	24

== Men's competition ==
=== Men's Featherweight (-63 kg) ===
RANK	NAME JUDOKA
	Brad Farrow (CAN)
	Héctor Rodríguez (CUB)
	Manuel Luna (VEN)
	Luis Shinohara (BRA)

=== Men's Lightweight (-70 kg) ===
RANK	NAME JUDOKA
	Wayne Erdman (CAN)
	Roberto Machusso (BRA)
	Patrick Burris (USA)
	Oscar Strático (ARG)

=== Men's Middleweight (-80 kg) ===
RANK	NAME JUDOKA
	Rainer Fischer (CAN)
	Carlos Motta (BRA)
	Steve Cohen (USA)
	Rafael Kidd (DOM)

=== Men's Light Heavyweight (-93 kg) ===
RANK	NAME JUDOKA
	Ricardo Campos (BRA)
	Irwin Cohen (USA)
	Roberto Batista (CUB)
	Chris Preobrazenski (CAN)

=== Men's Heavyweight (+93 kg) ===
RANK	NAME JUDOKA
	Allen Coage (USA)
	José Ibañez (CUB)
	Juan Santos (PUR)
	Femelo da Silva (BRA)

=== Men's Open ===
RANK	NAME JUDOKA
	José Ibañez (CUB)
	Jaime Felipa (AHO)
	Chris Preobrazenski (CAN)
	James Wooley (USA)
