= Christine Penick =

American judoka

Christine Penick (Christine Penick Lincoln; born November 30, 1956) is a judoka from the United States. She placed as a bronze medalist at the First Women's World Judo Championship (1980) venue in Madison Square Garden in New York, USA, which made her the first American woman and also the first African-American woman to ever place in American Judo history.

== Martial arts ==
From the age of 13 to 17 she gained over 30 state and local trophies with only first-place finishes. As a 17-year-old white belt with four years of training under Bob Ota, she beat 4 black belts and two color belts en route to gaining the 1965 national title. She would win in the international Desert Judo Championships in 1977. She would win Bronze at the First Women's World Judo Championship in the 145 pound division. She would win 10 Gold's in the National championships, 7 Golds in International Tournaments, and one Bronze in a world championship. Her last world championship was in 1987 where she placed 5th. She was considered for a US National Sambo Team.

== Personal life ==
She was an All City Swimmer. She would attend Trade Technical college. She would train with Cliff Penick.

Currently she teaches Judo and Self Defense at various locations in the Modesto area in California.

== See also ==
- 1980 World Judo Championships
