= Jimmy Wooley =

American judoka (born 1949)

Personal information
- Full name: James Ralph Wooley
- Born: March 8, 1949 (age 77) Houston, Texas, U.S.
Medal record
Men's judo
Representing the United States
Pan American Games
Bronze medal – third place	1975 Mexico City	Open Class

James Ralph Wooley (born March 8, 1949) is an American judoka and two time Olympian. He was born in Houston, Texas.

Wooley was a student of Karl Geis. He utilized ballet as a method of increasing his flexibility and improving his technique. Wooley was on the 1972 Olympic Team in Judo where he competed in the under 93 kg division. He was also on the 1976 Olympic Team competing in the open division. Wooley went on to become a doctor and a judo coach.
