= Portugal at the 1976 Summer Olympics =

- IOC code: POR
- NOC: Olympic Committee of Portugal

in Montreal
- Competitors: 19 in 6 sports
- Officials: 11
- Medals Ranked 30th: Gold 0 Silver 2 Bronze 0 Total 2

Summer Olympics appearances (overview)
- 1912; 1920; 1924; 1928; 1932; 1936; 1948; 1952; 1956; 1960; 1964; 1968; 1972; 1976; 1980; 1984; 1988; 1992; 1996; 2000; 2004; 2008; 2012; 2016; 2020; 2024

Portugal competed at the 1976 Summer Olympics in Montreal, Canada.

A delegation of nineteen competitors participated in six sports, conquering, for the first time, two silver medals in one Olympiad and one olympic medal in the athletics. The long-distance runner and future marathon olympic champion Carlos Lopes conquered, here in Montreal, the first of his two olympic medals.

== Medalists ==
=== Silver ===
- Carlos Lopes — Athletics, 10000m
- Armando Silva Marques — Shooting, Trap

== Results by event ==
=== Athletics ===
Men's 400m:

- José de Jesus Carvalho

- Round 1 (heat 6) — 48.47 (→ 7th, did not advance)

Men's 800m:

- Fernando Mamede

- Round 1 (heat 2) — 1:49.58 (→ 5th, did not advance)

Men's 1500m:

- Fernando Mamede

- Round 1 (heat 2) — 3:37.98 (→ 3rd)
- Semi-final (heat 1) — 3:42.59 (→ 8th, did not advance)

- Helder Baiona de Jesus

- Round 1 (heat 1) — 3:44.20 (→ 2nd)
- Semi-final (heat 2) — 3:47.37 (→ 8th, did not advance)

Men's 5000m:

- Aniceto Silva Simões

- Qualifying (heat 3) — 13:21.93 (→ 6th, qualified as 2nd fastest loser)
- Final — 13:29.38 (→ 8th)

- Carlos Lopes

- Qualifying (heat 2) — did not participate

Men's 10000m

- Carlos Lopes

- Qualifying (heat 1) — 28:04.53 (→ 1st)
- Final — 27:45.17 (→ Silver Medal)

Men's 400m Hurdles:

- José de Jesus Carvalho

- Round 1 (heat 1) — 50.99 (→ 4th)
- Semi-final — 49.97 (→ 2nd)
- Final → 49.94 (→ 5th)

Men's Marathon:

- Anacleto Pereira Pinto — 2:18:53.4 (→ 22nd)
- Carlos Lopes — did not participate

=== Judo ===
Men's Lightweight (–63 kg):

- José Gomes

Group B
- Round 1 — Mustapha Belahmira (MAR) (→ forfeited)
- Round 2 — Osman Yanar (TUR) (→ won by jury decision)
- Round 3 — Hector Rodriguez (CUB) (→ lost by ippon)
- Repêchage — Marian Standowicz (POL) (→ lost by yuko)

Men's Light Middleweight (–70 kg):

- António Roquete Andrade

Group A
- Round 1 — Koji Kuramoto (JAP) (→ lost by jury decision)
- Repêchage — Juan-Carlos Rodriguez (ESP) (→ lost by koka)

=== Sailing ===
Men's Double-Handed Dinghy (470):

- Joaquim Leça Ramada and Francisco Antunes Mourão — 137 pts (→ 21st)

Race	1	2	3	4	5	6	7	Total	Net
Place	18	18	14	9	~~28~~	22	20	Total	Net
Pts	24	24	20	15	~~34~~	28	26	171	137

=== Shooting ===
Trap:

- Armando Silva Marques — 189 hits (→ Silver Medal)

Round	1	2	3	4	5	6	7	8	Total
Hits	22	24	24	25	23	24	25	22	189

=== Swimming ===
Men's 100m Freestyle:

- José Gomes Pereira

- Heats (heat 6) — 55.46 (→ 7th, did not advance)

Men's 200m Freestyle:

- Paulo Frischknecht

- Heats (heat 5) — 2:02.65 (→ 7th, did not advance)

- José Gomes Pereira

- Heats (heat 4) — 2:03.03 (→ 6th, did not advance)

Men's 400m Freestyle:

- Rui Pinto de Abreu

- Heats (heat 4) — 4:28.43 (→ 7th, did not advance)

Men's 1500m Freestyle:

- António Botelho Melo

- Heats (heat 4) — 17:24.31 (→ 6th, did not advance)

Men's 4 × 200 m Freestyle Relay:

- António Botelho Melo, José Gomes Pereira, Paulo Frischknecht and Rui Pinto de Abreu

- Heats (heat 2) — 8:26.68 (→ 5th, did not advance)

Men's 100m Backstroke:

- António Botelho Melo

- Heats (heat 3) — 1:05.76 (→ 7th, did not advance)

Men's 200m Backstroke:

- António Botelho Melo

- Heats (heat 1) — 2:26.65 (→ 7th, did not advance)

Men's 100m Breaststroke:

- Henrique Carvalho Vicêncio

- Heats (heat 2) — 1:13.55 (→ 7th, did not advance)

Men's 200m Breaststroke:

- Henrique Carvalho Vicêncio

- Heats (heat 3) — 2:41.97 (→ 7th, did not advance)

Men's 100m Butterfly:

- Paulo Frischknecht

- Heats (heat 4) — 1:01.97 (→ 7th, did not advance)

Men's 200m Butterfly:

- Paulo Frischknecht

- Heats (heat 4) — 2:20.54 (→ 5th, did not advance)

Men's 400m Individual Medley:

- António Botelho Melo

- Heats (heat 3) — 5:11.48 (→ 7th, did not advance)

Men's 4 × 100 m Medley Relay:

- António Botelho Melo, Henrique Carvalho Vicêncio, José Gomes Pereira and Paulo Frischknecht

- Heats (heat 2) — 4:20.84 (→ 8th, did not advance)

=== Wrestling ===
Men's Greco-Roman Flyweight (–52 kg):

- Leonel Duarte

- Round 1 — Mohamed Karmous (MAR) (→ opponent disqualified; –4 pts)
- Round 2 — Rolf Krauss (GER) (→ won by fall; –8pts: did not advance)

Men's Greco-Roman Bantamweight (–57 kg):

- Luís Grilo

- Round 1 — Ali Lachkar (MAR) (→ opponent disqualified; –4 pts)
- Round 2 — Doug Yeats (CAN) (→ won by fall)
- Round 3 — Joseph Sade (USA) (→ lost by 30:1; –8 pts: did not advance)

Men's Greco-Roman Featherweight (–62 kg):

- Joaquim Jesus Vieira

- Round 1 — Stoyan Lazarov (BUL) (→ lost by fall; –4 pts)
- Round 2 — Kazimier Lipien (POL) (→ lost by fall; –8 pts: did not advance)

== Officials ==
- Luís Caldas (chief of mission)
