= List of recipients of Today's Top 10 Award =

This is a list of the recipients of the Today's Top 10 Award given each year by the National Collegiate Athletic Association (NCAA) since its inception in 1973. The names of these exceptional individuals are engraved in the Hall of Honor at the NCAA Hall of Champions on the NCAA Headquarters in Indianapolis, Indiana. Recognition in the NCAA Hall of Honor ensures these athletes are remembered. They have reached the pinnacle of national athletic and academic success through their accomplishments. As of 2020, there are more than 480,000 NCAA student-athletes annually. This award recognizes the nation's best former student-athletes from every NCAA sport and division. Each year, the recipients are honored at the NCAA Convention.

Note that the award was previously known as the Today's Top V Award (1973 through 1985), Today's Top VI Award (1986 through 1994), and Today's Top VIII Award (1995 through 2013).

== Today's Top 10 Award (2014–present) ==
=== 2021 Recipients ===
Recipient	School	Sport
Nia Akins	University of Pennsylvania	Cross Country, Indoor Track and Field, Outdoor Track and Field
Bernardo Amaral Neves	Washington University in St. Louis	Tennis
Brittny Ellis	University of Miami	Indoor Track and Field, Outdoor Track and Field
Alison Gibson	University of Texas at Austin	Swimming, Diving
Eoin Gronningsater	Duke University	Fencing
Deshawn Jones	Missouri University of Science and Technology	Football
Lily Justine	University of California, Los Angeles	Beach Volleyball
Kayla Leland	Whitworth University	Cross Country, Indoor Track and Field, Outdoor Track and Field, Basketball
Asia Seidt	University of Kentucky	Swimming, Diving
Juah Toe	West Chester University	Rugby

=== 2020 Recipients ===
Recipient	School	Sport
Jimmy Bendeck	Baylor University	Tennis
Iman Blow	Columbia University	Fencing
Virginia Elena Carta	Duke University	Golf
Kaitlin Hatch	West Chester University	Field Hockey
Kirby Hora	Augustana University	Football
Cassandra Laios	Case Western Reserve University	Indoor Track and Field, Outdoor Track and Field
Hannah Orbach-Mandel	Kenyon College	Swimming
Kristin Quah	Vanderbilt University	Bowling
Anton Stephenson	University of Nebraska–Lincoln	Gymnastics
Virginia Thrasher	West Virginia University	Rifle

=== 2019 Recipients ===
Recipient	School	Sport
Ama Biney	Worcester Polytechnic Institute	Basketball, Softball
Andrea Bryson	St. Cloud State University	Swimming
Jevon Carter	West Virginia University	Basketball
Lucas Kaliszak	University of Alabama	Swimming
Alison Lindsay	Washington University in St. Louis	Cross Country, Indoor Track and Field, Outdoor Track and Field
Alex McMurty	University of Georgia	Gymnastics
Kenturah Orji	University of Georgia	Track and field
Ben Reeves	Yale University	Lacrosse
Kyle Snyder	Ohio State University	Wrestling
Julia Wilson	Kenyon College	Swimming

=== 2018 Recipients ===
Recipient	School	Sport
Kasey Cooper	Auburn University	Softball
Marie Coors	Saint Leo University	Golf
Elizabeth Crist	Washington University in St. Louis	Soccer
Danielle Galyer	University of Kentucky	Swimming, Diving
Sarah Gibson	Texas A&M University, College Station	Swimming, Diving
Riley Hanson	Concordia University, St. Paul	Volleyball
Thai-Son Kwiatkowski	University of Virginia	Tennis
Amy Regan	Stevens Institute of Technology	Track and field
Deko Ricketts	Washington University in St. Louis	Track and field
Maggie Steffens	Stanford University	Water Polo

=== 2017 Recipients ===
Recipient	School	Sport
Logan Andryk	Milwaukee School of Engineering	Soccer
Elizabeth Aronoff	Emory University	Swimming, Diving
Kendall Coyne	Northeastern University	Ice hockey
Taylor Ellis-Watson	University of Arkansas, Fayetteville	Track and field
Nicole Hensley	Lindenwood University	Ice hockey
C.J. Krimbill	Case Western Reserve University	Tennis
Haylie McCleney	University of Alabama	Softball
Tiffany Mitchell	University of South Carolina, Columbia	Basketball
Dak Prescott	Mississippi State University	Football
Jason Vander Laan	Ferris State University	Football

=== 2016 Recipients ===
Recipient	School	Sport
Anastasia Bogdanovski	Johns Hopkins	Swimming, Diving
Matt Brown	Penn State	Wrestling
Lucy Cheadle	Washington (MO)	Cross-country, track and field
John Coleman	Clarkson	Baseball, basketball
Georgia Dabritz	Utah	Gymnastics
Kristin Day	Clarion	Swimming, Diving
Ruben Gimenez	Bridgeport	Swimming, Diving
Kendra Harrison	Kentucky	Track and field
Colleen Quigley	Florida State	Cross-country, track and field
Zach Zenner	South Dakota State	Football

=== 2015 Recipients ===
Recipient	School	Sport
Lauren Battista	Bentley University	Basketball
Abbey D'Agostino	Dartmouth College	Cross Country, Track and field
Joe Fletcher	Loyola University	Lacrosse
Kristen Hixon	Grand Valley State University	Track and field
Gabe Ikard	University of Oklahoma	Football
Kim Jacob	University of Alabama	Gymnastics
Megan Light	Emory University	Softball
Nicole Michmerhuizen	Calvin College	Cross Country, Track and field
Mark Thomas	Livingstone College	Basketball
Shannon Vreeland	University of Georgia	Swimming

=== 2014 Recipients ===
Recipient	School	Sport
Brigetta Barrett	Arizona	Track and field
Amber Brooks	North Carolina	Soccer
Raven Chavanne	Tennessee	Softball
Elena Delle Donne	Delaware	Basketball, volleyball
Ellie Duffy	Concordia (St. Paul)	Volleyball
Barrett Jones	Alabama	Football
Jocelyne Lamoureux	North Dakota	Ice hockey
Tim Nelson	Wisconsin–Stout	Cross-country, track and field
Kayla Shull	Clarion	Swimming, Diving
Mary Weatherholt	Nebraska	Tennis

== Today's Top VIII Award (1995–2013) ==
Year	Recipient	School	Sport
Class of 2011	Amy Backel	University of Oklahoma	Indoor and outdoor track and field
	Zach Carr	Stevens Institute of Technology	Soccer
	Casie Hanson	University of North Dakota	Ice hockey and softball
	Dan Laurent	University of Wisconsin–La Crosse	Wrestling
	Greg McElroy	University of Alabama	Football
	Marcia Newby	University of Georgia	Gymnastics
	Jessica Pixler	Seattle Pacific University	Cross country and indoor and outdoor track and field
	Jeff Spear	Columbia University	Fencing
Class of 2010	Amanda Blumenherst	Duke University	Golf
	Courtney Kupets	University of Georgia	Gymnastics
	Venessa Lee	Pittsburg State University	Cross country and indoor and outdoor track and field
	Jeff Lerg	Michigan State University	Ice hockey
	Kent Raymond	Wheaton College (Illinois)	Basketball
	Brittany Rogers	University of Alabama	Softball
	Sarah Stevens	Arizona State University	Indoor and outdoor track and field
	Tim Tebow	University of Florida	Football
Class of 2009	Yael Averbuch	University of North Carolina at Chapel Hill	Soccer
	Kirby Blackley	University of Findlay	Indoor and outdoor track and field
	Dylan Carney	Stanford University	Gymnastics
	Gregory Mitchell	Mount Union College	Football
	Kristi Miller	Georgia Institute of Technology	Tennis
	Louis Sakoda	University of Utah	Football
	Katy Tafler	Grand Valley State University	Soccer
	Angela Tincher	Virginia Polytechnic Institute and State University	Softball
Class of 2008	Rachel Buehler	Stanford University	Soccer
	Roberto Castro	Georgia Institute of Technology	Golf
	Dennis L. Dixon, Jr.	University of Oregon	Football
	Sarah Pavan	University of Nebraska–Lincoln	Volleyball
	Ben Wildman-Tobriner	Stanford University	Swimming
	Lisa Winkle	Calvin College	Basketball, Outdoor Track and Field
	Jaimie Wolf	Clarion University of Pennsylvania	Diving
	Sarah Zerzan	Willamette University	Cross Country, Outdoor Track and Field
Class of 2007	Alison Crocker	Dartmouth College	Skiing and rowing
	Laura Gerraughty	University of North Carolina at Chapel Hill	Indoor and outdoor track and field
	Ryan Koch	St. Cloud State University	football and outdoor track and field
	Adrianne Musu Jackson-Buckner	State University College at Oneonta	Indoor track and field
	Beth Mallory	University of Alabama	Indoor and outdoor track and field
	Heather A. O'Reilly	University of North Carolina at Chapel Hill	Soccer
	Catherine L. Osterman	The University of Texas at Austin	Softball
	Kate Richardson	University of California, Los Angeles	Gymnastics
Class of 2006	Samantha Arsenault	University of Georgia	Swimming and Diving
	Sarah Dance	Truman State University	Swimming and Diving
	Carter Hamill	Amherst College	Outdoor track and field, and cross country
	Nicholas Hartigan	Brown University	Football
	DeMeco Ryans	University of Alabama	Football
	Richelle Simpson	University of Nebraska–Lincoln	Gymnastics
	Christine Sinclair	University of Portland	Soccer
	Jamie Southern	California State University, Fresno	Softball
Class of 2005	Kelly Albin	University of California, Davis	Lacrosse
	Caesar Garcia	Auburn University	Swimming
	Tara Kirk	Stanford University	Swimming
	Kelly Mazzante	Pennsylvania State University	Basketball
	Kay Mikolajczak	University of Wisconsin, Oshkosh	Women’s Basketball and Outdoor Track and Field
	Ogonna Nnamani	Stanford University	Volleyball
	Angela Ruggiero	Harvard University	Women’s Ice Hockey
	Kelly Wilson	University of Texas at Austin	Women’s Soccer
Class of 2004	Elisha N. Manning	University of Mississippi	Football
	Craig Krenzel	Ohio State University	Football
Class of 2003	Stacey Nuveman	University of California, Los Angeles	Softball
	Aly Wagner	Santa Clara University	Soccer
Class of 2002	Kimberly A. Black	University of Georgia	Swimming
	André Davis	Virginia Tech	Football / Track & Field
	Misty Hyman	Stanford University	Swimming
	Ruth Riley	University of Notre Dame	Basketball
Class of 2001	Drew C. Brees	Purdue University	Football
	Kristy Kowal	University of Georgia	Swimming
	Josh Sims	Princeton University	Lacrosse
	Matthew Busbee	Auburn University	Swimming
	Alia Fischer	Washington University	Basketball
	Andrea M. Garner	Penn State University	Basketball
	Amanda Scott	California State University, Fresno	Softball
	Kevin M. Listerman	Northern Kentucky University	Basketball
Class of 2000	J. Chadwick Pennington	Marshall University	Football
Class of 1999	Peggy Boutilier	University of Virginia	Lacrosse / Field Hockey
	Kristin Folkl	Stanford University	Basketball / Volleyball
	Kevin Sullivan	University of Michigan	Track & Field / Cross Country
Class of 1998	Lisa Coole	University of Georgia	Swimming
	Brian D. Griese	University of Michigan	Football
	Peyton W. Manning	University of Tennessee	Football
	Obadele Thompson	University of Texas at El Paso	Track
Class of 1997	Attim K. H. "Tiki" Barber	University of Virginia	Football
	Jennifer Marie Renola	University of Notre Dame	Soccer
	Daniel C. Wuerffel	University of Florida	Football
Class of 1996	Rebecca R. Lobo	University of Connecticut	Basketball
	Jennifer B. Thompson	Stanford University	Swimming
Class of 1995	Kelly Blair	University of Oregon	Track & Field
	Derrick Brooks	Florida State University	Football
	Lisa Anne Flood	Villanova University	Swimming

== Today's Top VI Award (1986–1994) ==
Year	Recipient	School	Sport
Class of 1994	Trev Alberts	University of Nebraska–Lincoln	Football
	Kenneth J. Alexander	Florida State University	Football
	Christie Allen	Pittsburg State University	Track & Field
	Lisa M. Fernandez	University of California, Los Angeles	Softball
	Nnenna J. Lynch	Villanova University	Track & Field
	John L. Roethlisberger	University of Minnesota	Gymnastics
Class of 1993	Michael Compton	West Virginia University	Football
	Carlton P. Gray	University of California, Los Angeles	Football
	Clyston "Steve" Holman	Georgetown University	Track & Field
	Melissa A. Marlowe	University of Utah	Gymnastics
	Susan K. Robinson	Pennsylvania State University	Basketball
	Gino Torretta	University of Miami	Football
Class of 1992	Ty H. Detmer	Brigham Young University	Football
	Gea Johnson	Arizona State University	Track & Field
	Janet Kruse	University of Nebraska–Lincoln	Volleyball
	Joy Selig	Oregon State University	Gymnastics
	Brad Werenka	Northern Michigan University	Ice Hockey
	David L. Wharton	University of Southern California	Swimming
Class of 1991	Suzanne M. Favor	University of Wisconsin	Track & Field / Cross Country
	Patrick Kirksey	University of Nebraska–Lincoln	Gymnastics
	Edward T. McCaffrey	Stanford University	Football
	Meredith Rainey	Harvard University	Track & Field
	Marie Roethlisberger	University of Minnesota	Gymnastics
	Pat Tyrance	University of Nebraska–Lincoln	Football
Class of 1990	Vicki Huber	Villanova University	Track & Field
	John M. Jackson	University of Southern California	Football
	Jolanda F. Jones	University of Houston	Track & Field
	James S. Martin	Pennsylvania State University	Wrestling
	Virginia Stahr	University of Nebraska–Lincoln	Volleyball
	Jacob C. Young III	University of Nebraska–Lincoln	Football
Class of 1989	Dylann Duncan	Brigham Young University	Volleyball
	Suzanne T. McConnell	Pennsylvania State University	Basketball
	Faith E. "Betsy" Mitchell	University of Texas at Austin	Swimming and Diving
	Anthony P. Phillips	University of Oklahoma	Football
	Thomas Schlesinger	University of Nebraska–Lincoln	Gymnastics
	Mark M. Stepnoski	University of Pittsburgh	Football
Class of 1988	Regina K. Cavanaugh	Rice University	Track & Field
	Charles D. Cecil	University of Arizona	Football
	Keith J. Jackson	University of Oklahoma	Football
	Gordon C. Lockbaum	College of the Holy Cross	Football
	Mary T. Meagher	University of California, Berkeley	Swimming
	David M. Robinson	United States Naval Academy	Basketball
Class of 1987	Lisa L. Ice	San José State University	Volleyball
	Jon L. Louis	Stanford University	Gymnastics
	Cheryl D. Miller	University of Southern California	Basketball
	John C. Moffet	Stanford University	Swimming
	Dub W. Myers	University of Oregon	Cross Country / Track
	Megan L. Neyer	University of Florida	Diving
Class of 1986	James A. Dombrowski	University of Virginia	Football
	Edward D. Eyestone	Brigham Young University	Track
	Timothy J. Green	Syracuse University	Football
	Susan K. Harbour	University of Oregon	Volleyball
	Kathryn L. Hayes	University of Oregon	Track
	Lauri A. Young	Northeast Louisiana University	Track

== Today's Top V Award (1973–1985) ==
Year	Recipient	School	Sport
Class of 1985	Gregg Carr	Auburn University	Football
	Tracy Caulkins	University of Florida	Swimming
	Douglas R. Flutie	Boston College	Football
	Mark J. Traynowicz	University of Nebraska–Lincoln	Football
	Susan E. Walsh	University of North Carolina	Swimming
Class of 1984	John E. Frank	Ohio State University	Football
	Elizabeth Heiden	University of Vermont	Multiple sports
	Terrell L. Hoage	University of Georgia	Football
	Stefan G. Humphries	University of Michigan	Football
	J. Steven Young	Brigham Young University	Football
Class of 1983	Bruce R. Baumgartner	Indiana State University	Wrestling
	John A. Elway	Stanford University	Football
	Richard J. Giusto	University of Virginia	Lacrosse
	Charles F. "Karch" Kiraly	University of California, Los Angeles	Volleyball
	Dave Rimington	University of Nebraska–Lincoln	Football
Class of 1982	Par J. Arvidsson	University of California, Berkeley	Swimming
	Ambrose "Rowdy" Gaines IV	Auburn University	Swimming
	Oliver Luck	West Virginia University	Football
	Kenneth W. Sims	University of Texas at Austin	Football
	Lynette Woodard	University of Kansas	Basketball
Class of 1981	Darrell Griffith	University of Louisville	Basketball
	Mark D. Herrmann	Purdue University	Football
	Donald J. Paige	Villanova University	Track
	Ronald K. Perry	College of the Holy Cross	Basketball
	Randy Lee Schleusener	University of Nebraska–Lincoln	Football
Class of 1980	Gregory Kelser	Michigan State University	Basketball
	Paul B. McDonald	University of Southern California	Football
	R. Scott Neilson	University of Washington	Track & Field
	Steadman S. Shealy	University of Alabama	Football
	Marc D. Wilson	Brigham Young University	Football
Class of 1979	William A. Banks III	University of California, Los Angeles	Track & Field
	Robert W. Dugas	Louisiana State University	Football
	Stephen R. Fuller	Clemson University	Football
	Daniel L. Harrigan	North Carolina State University	Swimming
	James J. Kovach	University of Kentucky	Football
Class of 1978	Michael J. Bourdeau	Randolph-Macon College	Baseball / Soccer
	Daniel R. Mackesey	Cornell College	Lacrosse / Soccer
	John P. Naber	University of Southern California	Swimming
	S. Gifford Nielsen	Brigham Young University	Football
	Bryan L. Rodgers	Delta State University	Baseball
Class of 1977	Jeffrey A. Dankworth	University of California, Los Angeles	Football
	Randolph H. Dean	Northwestern University	Football
	Steven C. Furniss	University of Southern California	Swimming
	John F. Hencken	Stanford University	Swimming
	Gerald G. Huesken	Susquehanna University	Football
Class of 1976	Marvin L. Cobb	University of Southern California	Baseball / Football
	Archie M. Griffin	Ohio State University	Football
	Bruce A. Hamming	Augustana College (Illinois)	Basketball
	P. Timothy Moore	Ohio State University	Diving
	John M. Sciarra	University of California, Los Angeles	Football
Class of 1975	John R. Baiorunos	Pennsylvania State University	Football
	Patrick C. Haden	University of Southern California	Football
	Randy L. Hall	University of Alabama	Football
	Jarrett T. Hubbard	University of Michigan	Wrestling
	Tony G. Waldrop	University of North Carolina	Track
Class of 1974	David A. Blandino	University of Pittsburgh	Football
	Paul D. Collins	Illinois State University	Basketball
	David D. Gallagher	University of Michigan	Football
	Gary W. Hall	Indiana University	Swimming
	David J. Wottle	Bowling Green State University	Track
Class of 1973	Robert W. Ash	Cornell University	Football
	Bruce P. Bannon	Pennsylvania State University	Football
	Blake L. Ferguson	Drexel University	Lacrosse
	Jerry A. Heidenreich	Southern Methodist University	Swimming
	Sidney A. Sink	Bowling Green State University	Track
