= Judo at the 1976 Summer Olympics – Men's 63 kg =

Judo competition

Men's 63 kg at the Games of the XXI Olympiad
- Venue: Olympic Velodrome
- Date: 30 July 1976
- Competitors: 29 from 29 nations

Medalists
| 1st place, gold medalist(s) | | Héctor Rodríguez | Cuba |
| 2nd place, silver medalist(s) | | Chang Eun-kyung | South Korea |
| 3rd place, bronze medalist(s) | | József Tuncsik | Hungary |
| 3rd place, bronze medalist(s) | | Felice Mariani | Italy |

The men's 63 kg competition in judo at the 1976 Summer Olympics in Montreal was held on 30 July at the Olympic Velodrome. Two single-elimination pools, with winner of each pool advanced to the final. All judoka losing to the winner of each pool advanced to repêchage pools, with the winners of the repêchage pools earning bronze medals.

== Results ==
=== Finals ===
Semi-finals
Chang Eun-kyung (KOR) | W
Felice Mariani (ITA) | L
József Tuncsik (HUN) | L
Héctor Rodríguez (CUB) | W

Final
Chang Eun-kyung (KOR) | L
Héctor Rodríguez (CUB) | W

=== Repechages ===
| Repechage | | Repechage semifinal | | Repechage final |
| Erich Pointner (AUT) | W |
| Pakit Santhisiri (THA) | W | Erich Pointner (AUT) | W |
| | | Brad Farrow (CAN) | L |
| | | | | Erich Pointner (AUT) | L |
| | | | | Felice Mariani (ITA) | W (bronze) |

| Repechage | Repechage semifinal | | Repechage final |
| | Marian Standowicz (POL) | W |
| | José Gomes (POR) | L |
| | | | Marian Standowicz (POL) | L |
| | | | József Tuncsik (HUN) | W (bronze) |

=== Pool A ===
Round of 32
Papa M'Bengue (SEN) | L
Angelo Ruiz (PUR) | W
Brad Farrow (CAN) | W
Kamal Al-Athari (KUW) | L
Chang Eun-kyung (KOR) | W
Erich Pointner (AUT) | L
Larseric Flygh (SWE) | -
Pakit Santhisiri (THA) | WO
Constantine Alexander (GBR) | W
Joseph Bost (USA) | L
Felice Mariani (ITA) | W
Oleg Zurabiani (URS) | L
Enrique del Valle (ECU) | L
Yves Delvingt (FRA) | W
Bye
Yoshiha Minami (JPN)

Round of 16
Angelo Ruíz (PUR) | L
Brad Farrow (CAN) | W
Chang Eun-kyung (KOR) | W
Pakit Santhisiri (THA) | L
Konstantin Alexander (GBR) | L
Felice Mariani (ITA) | W
Yves Delvingt (FRA) | W
Yoshiharu Minami (JPN) | L

Quarterfinal
Brad Farrow (CAN) | L
Chang Eun-kyung (KOR) | W
Felice Mariani (ITA) | W
Yves Delvingt (FRA) | L

Semifinal
Chang Eun-kyung (KOR) | W
Felice Mariani (ITA) | R

=== Pool B ===
Round of 32
Warren Richards (AUS) | L
Ivan Vidmajer (YUG) | W
Gerardo Padilla (MEX) | L
József Tuncsik (HUN) | W
Parvan Parvanov (BUL) | W
David Saad (LIB) | L
Alexander Leibkind (FRG) | L
Bakhvain Buyadaa (MGL) | W
Mustapha Belahmira (MAR)
José Gomes (POR) | WO
Pak Yong Un (PRK)
Osman Yanar (TUR) | WO
Manuel Luna (VEN) | L
Marian Standowicz (POL) | W
Héctor Rodríguez (CUB) | WO
Emmanuel Abolo (CMR)

Round of 16
Ivan Vidmajer (YUG) | L
József Tuncsik (HUN) | W
Parvan Parvanov (BUL) | L
Bakhvain Buyadaa (MGL) | W
José Gomes (POR) | W
Osman Yanar (TUR) | L
Marian Standowicz (POL) | L
Héctor Rodríguez (CUB) | W

Quarterfinal
József Tuncsik (HUN) | W
Bakhvain Buyadaa (MGL) | L
José Gomes (POR) | L
Héctor Rodríguez (CUB) | W

Semifinal
József Tuncsik (HUN) | L
Héctor Rodríguez (CUB) | W
