= Ariel Helwani =

Canadian-American sports journalist (born 1982)

Ariel Jacob Helwani
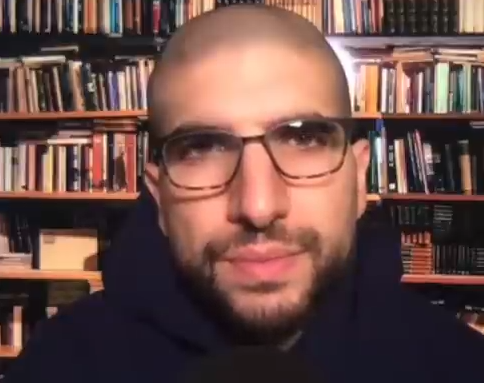
- Helwani in 2021
- Born: July 8, 1982 (age 44); Montreal, Quebec, Canada
- Occupation: Sports journalist
- Years active: 2006–present
- Spouse: Jaclyn Stein Helwani
- Children: 3
- Relatives: Gad Saad (uncle); David Saad (uncle)

Ariel Jacob Helwani (Arabic: ارئيل يعقوب حلواني; Hebrew: אריאל יעקב חלוואני; born July 8, 1982) is a Canadian-American sports journalist, known for his coverage of mixed martial arts (MMA), boxing, and professional wrestling. He is best known for his work at MMA Fighting, but has also worked for Fox and ESPN. He has won MMA Journalist of the Year at the World MMA Awards every year since 2010.

== Early life and education ==
Ariel Helwani (the surname indicates a family connection to the city of Helwan in Egypt) was born to Mizrahi Jewish parents in Montreal, Canada, as the youngest of four siblings. His father is of Syrian lineage but was born and raised in Alexandria, Egypt, and his mother is from Beirut, Lebanon. His father moved to Lebanon in his late teens, before he and his family moved to Montreal in 1967, while his mother and her family moved to the same Canadian city in 1973 because "it was starting to get increasingly dangerous for Jews in Lebanon". Helwani is the maternal nephew of David Saad, a judoka who competed in the men's lightweight event at the 1976 Summer Olympics, and Gad Saad, an evolutionary psychologist. Helwani is fluent in English, French, and Hebrew, and understands Spanish and Arabic.

Helwani grew up in Montreal and Westmount, Quebec, and attended the Akiva School and Herzliah High School. In 2004, Helwani graduated from Syracuse University's S.I. Newhouse School of Public Communications in Syracuse, New York. While there, he hosted a sports radio show on the student-run WERW and received a summer internship with NBC covering the 2004 Summer Olympics, but had to withdraw due to an ankle injury. Although he had encountered mixed martial arts (MMA) as a preteen, it was when he came across it again while attending university that he decided to pursue a career in it, knowing that his classmates and future rivals in sports journalism would not be interested in the then-fringe sport. Helwani has stated that he wanted to be the "Howard Cosell of MMA". He credits his mother, "who [his] friends would always call for advice", for his interview skills, and his father, "who never gave an excuse or took a sick day", for his work ethic.

== Career ==
Having had an internship with HBO in early 2003, Helwani became a sports production assistant at the company in 2004. After a month-long stint at Spike TV, Helwani quit and founded his own website on October 19, 2007, JarryPark.com. He stated that he starting building his network by messaging every fighter he could find on Myspace. Helwani also worked for the websites MMA Rated, Versus.com (later NBCSports.com), and AOL's FanHouse. He started working at MMA Fighting, after it was bought by AOL in 2009. There, Helwani launched the weekly show The MMA Hour with Ariel Helwani in June 2009, which he produced and hosted. The dual audio and visual nature of the show was influenced by his love of The Howard Stern Show. Helwani also hosted the website's The MMA Beat show on YouTube and co-hosted the SiriusXM radio show Fight Club.

Helwani served as an "MMA Insider" for Fox Sports 1's weekly UFC Tonight show and other pre- and post-event programming from 2011. He was fired from Fox in March 2016. Helwani then revealed that his position on UFC Tonight came under the condition that his paycheck had to come from the UFC's parent company, Zuffa. Calling it the biggest regret of his life, Helwani said he accepted the arrangement by viewing the money as coming from Fox and "filtered through" Zuffa. According to Helwani, "they didn't like certain things I was talking about on my show, and for going to a Bellator media event. But they never told me not to go, or not talk about certain things. The people I was really mad at were the people at FOX, who just let the UFC dictate what they were doing and not standing up for me."

=== UFC ban and reinstatement ===
On June 4, 2016, Helwani and two of his MMA Fighting colleagues were escorted out of UFC 199 before the main event started. Their press credentials were taken and they were banned for life from all UFC events. UFC president Dana White announced that the ban would last "As long as I'm here." and reputedly later added "[Helwani] can cover all the events he wants, he just can't have a credential". Earlier in the day, Helwani had reported that Brock Lesnar would be returning at UFC 200, hours before the UFC announced it on the 199 broadcast. UFC spokesman Dave Sholler said "professional standards dictate that journalists are to contact the UFC for comment before reporting a story", but that the scoop on Lesnar's return was not the sole reason for Helwani's removal. On an episode of The MMA Hour, Helwani detailed the incident in an emotional broadcast. He said he was brought to see Dana White, who told him he was banned for being "too negative". He later learned this decision was made by then-UFC CEO and Zuffa founder Lorenzo Fertitta. Helwani stood by his decision to report the news in a timely manner.

The UFC's actions were widely criticized by journalists, and several high profile UFC fighters sympathized with Helwani, including Jon Jones and Chris Weidman, the latter of which said, "This sport needs the GOAT of MMA reporting".

Two days later, the UFC rescinded the ban on June 6, 2016, stating:

Following a conversation with the editorial team at SB Nation, UFC will not prevent MMAFighting.com from receiving media credentials to cover live UFC events. We respect the role the media plays in our sport and beyond, including MMAFighting's ability to report news. However, in our opinion, we believe the recurring tactics used by its lead reporter extended beyond the purpose of journalism. We feel confident our position has now been adequately communicated to the SB Nation editorial team.

Helwani credited the reactions from the media and fans for forcing the UFC to lift the ban. The UFC 199 incident facilitated the June 2017 formation of the Mixed Martial Arts Journalists Association, with interim president Dann Stupp stating "Our initial efforts in 2009 never got off the ground, but we're doing this now because it's become increasingly obvious that it's long overdue". At formation, Helwani was a member of its board of directors.

In August 2017, Helwani claimed that he was removed from the Showtime Sports broadcast team for the Floyd Mayweather Jr. vs. Conor McGregor press tour, hours before the first press conference in Los Angeles at the UFC's request. "Not working for @SHOsports anymore on the May/Mac tour," wrote Helwani on Twitter, "UFC specifically asked to have me removed. Incredibly disappointed."

=== ESPN ===
With his contract with MMA Fighting set to expire in June 2018, Helwani received an offer from ESPN that February. He notified MMA Fighting, but they never offered him a new contract. Helwani joined ESPN in June 2018, shortly after the company announced their 5-year, $1.5 billion rights package with the UFC. He hosted Ariel Helwani's MMA Show on Twitter and YouTube, Ariel & the Bad Guy with Chael Sonnen on ESPN+, and the DC & Helwani podcast with Daniel Cormier. He also contributed to occasional ESPN broadcasts of the NBA. In June 2021, Helwani announced his departure from ESPN after failing to reach terms on a new contract. Andrew Marchand of the New York Post reported that Helwani made just short of $500,000 a year at ESPN, but their new offers to him included a 5% pay reduction as part of company wide cost-cutting.

=== Return to MMA Fighting & New Ventures ===
Helwani subsequently announced his return to MMA Fighting and as host and producer of The MMA Hour, with a new twice weekly schedule. He also began working for BT Sport and Spotify/The Ringer, where he also covers boxing and professional wrestling, while creating non-MMA content for his own YouTube channel. He also launched a Substack account for his written thoughts. Helwani explained that he does not want to just be viewed as "the MMA guy" or "the combat guy. I want to be viewed, quite honestly if I can be so brash, as the best interviewer in sports. And if I want to do that, I need to do many different things." In September 2021, he became a brand ambassador for BetMGM. After interning on the show in 2003, Helwani returned to Real Sports with Bryant Gumbel in July 2022, this time as an on-air correspondent.

=== Yahoo Sports and Uncrowned ===
In August 2024 Helwani announced his contracts with Spotify and MMA Fighting had been fulfilled, and even though they offered him a new contract, he announced he was joining Yahoo Sports where he would serve as the anchor of a new Combat Sports Vertical called Uncrowned. He announced he will be hosting a new program alongside some of his colleagues from MMA Fighting and Spotify, called The Ariel Helwani Show, set to begin airing three times a week in mid October 2024. He has said one of the reasons for the move is now he will be free to discuss more than MMA, and that he will now own his own content.

Helwani has also worked presenting duties for CBC for both the 2024 and 2026 Olympics as well as various boxing events on DAZN and Netflix.

== Personal life ==
Helwani married Jaclyn Stein, CEO and designer at Anzie Jewelry, on October 25, 2008. They have three children, one daughter and two sons, and both became American citizens on March 8, 2022. Helwani kept kosher from seventh grade until his mid-20s, when he found it too difficult to stick to while traveling for work, but said he still uses tefillin every day.

He is a fan of the New York Knicks, Buffalo Bills, Toronto Blue Jays, and Montreal Canadiens. He has previously supported the association football team Everton FC, but rescinded his support for the club at the end of the 2021-22 season. Helwani currently supports Nottingham Forest, and has interviewed former Nottingham Forest forward Brennan Johnson, claiming to be a "huge fan" of his.

Helwani is also a fan of darts. He has received praise from Eddie Hearn and Hearn believes that Ariel can be a catalyst for the growth and popularity of the sport in North America.

== Honors and awards ==
Helwani has won MMA Journalist of the Year at the World MMA Awards every year since 2010. In 2011, Fight! Magazine named him as one of their "Power 20", a list of the "most significant power players, movers, shakers, ambassadors, and game-changers in MMA". Helwani won 2014 Journalist of the Year at the Awakening WMMA Awards.

Helwani has hosted two separate Helwani Nose Awards events in Chicago and Las Vegas, where current and former MMA fighters participate in a UFC trivia show for the Nose World Order belt.
