= Pointner =

Pointner is a German surname. Notable people with the surname include:

- Alexander Pointner (born 1971), Austrian ski jumping coach
- Anton Pointner (1894–1949), Austrian film actor
- Erich Pointner (born 1950), Austrian judoka
- Hans Pointner (1908–date of death unknown), Austrian wrestler

== See also ==
- Peintner
