= Vidmajer =

Vidmajer is a surname. Notable people with the surname include:

- Ivan Vidmajer (born 1949), Slovenian judoka
- Tadej Vidmajer (born 1992), Slovenian footballer
