= Sugar Creek Elementary School =

Sugar Creek Elementary School or Sugarcreek Elementary School may refer to:

- Sugar Creek Elementary School, Bentonville School District, Bentonville, Arkansas
- Sugar Creek Elementary School, McLean County Unit District No. 5, Normal, Illinois
- Sugar Creek Elementary School, North Montgomery School Corporation, Montgomery County, Indiana
- Sugar Creek Elementary School, Community School Corporation of Southern Hancock County, New Palestine, Indiana
- Sugar Creek Elementary School, Independence Public School District, Sugar Creek, Missouri
- Sugar Creek Elementary School, York County School District 4, Fort Mill, South Carolina
- Sugar Creek Elementary School, Verona Area School District, Verona, Wisconsin
- Sugarcreek Elementary School, Karns City Area School District, Cowansville, Pennsylvania
