= Maxen Hook =

American football player (born 2001)

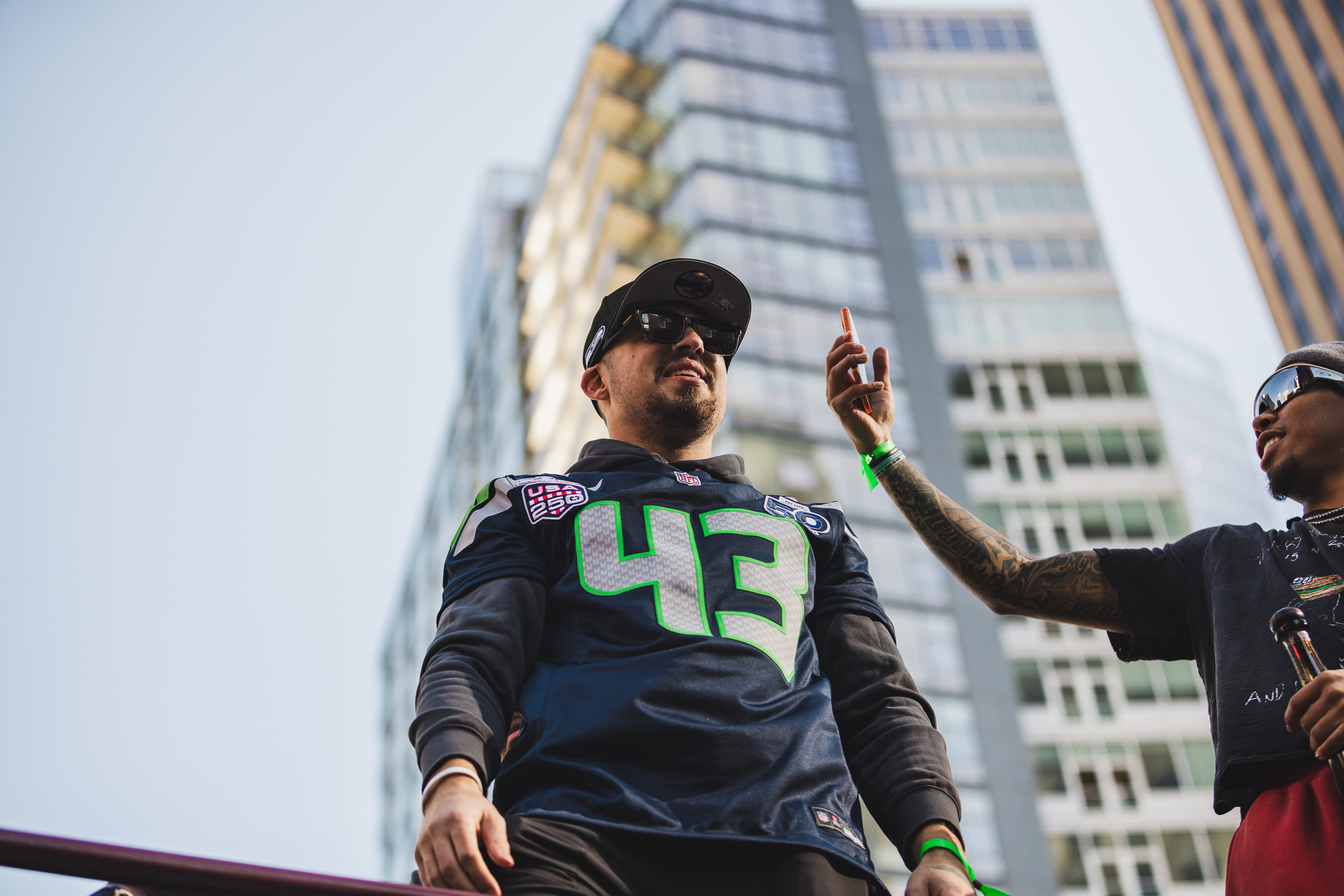
- Hook at the Super Bowl LX victory parade

No. 43 – Seattle Seahawks
- Position: Safety
- Roster status: Practice squad

Personal information
- Born: August 19, 2001 (age 25); New Palestine, Indiana, U.S.
- Listed height: 6 ft 0 in (1.83 m)
- Listed weight: 205 lb (93 kg)

Career information
- High school: New Palestine (IN)
- College: Toledo (2020-2024)
- NFL draft: 2025: undrafted

Career history
- Philadelphia Eagles (2025)*; Seattle Seahawks (2025–present)
- * Offseason or practice squad member only

Awards and highlights
- Super Bowl champion (LX); 3× First-team All-MAC (2022–2024); Third-team All-MAC (2021)

Career NFL statistics as of Week 3, 2026
- Games played: 1
- Stats at Pro Football Reference

Maxen Michael Hook (born August 19, 2001) is an American professional football safety for the Seattle Seahawks of the National Football League (NFL). He played college football for the Toledo Rockets.

== Early life ==
Hook attended New Palestine High School in New Palestine, Indiana. He was rated as a two-star recruit and committed to play college football for the Toledo Rockets.

== College career ==
As a freshman in 2020 Hook appeared in six games where he notched three tackles. During the 2021 and 2022 seasons, he recorded 176 tackles with seven being for a loss, two sacks, seven pass deflections, and two interceptions. In week 7 of the 2023 season, Hook totaled five tackles, a pass deflection, and the game-sealing interception against Ball State. During the 2023 season, he appeared in nine games where he totaled 69 tackles, seven pass deflections, three interceptions, a forced fumble, and a fumble recovery. In week 13 of the 2024 season, Hook recorded a career-high 16 tackles versus Ohio. In the 2024 season, he totaled 107 tackles with one being for a loss, and two interceptions for Toledo. Hook was named all-MAC four times, being named first team all-MAC three times from 2022 to 2024, and third team all-MAC in 2021. He was also a two-time team captain. After the 2024 season, Hook declared for the 2025 NFL draft, while also accepting an invite to participate in the 2025 Senior Bowl.

== Professional career ==
Pre-draft measurables
Height	Weight	Arm length	Hand span	Wingspan	40-yard dash	10-yard split	20-yard split	20-yard shuttle	Three-cone drill	Vertical jump	Broad jump	Bench press
6 ft 0 1/2 in (1.84 m)	202 lb (92 kg)	31 1/2 in (0.80 m)	9 1/8 in (0.23 m)	6 ft 3 1/2 in (1.92 m)	4.55 s	1.55 s	2.64 s	4.34 s	6.92 s	35.5 in (0.90 m)	10 ft 4 in (3.15 m)	18 reps
All values from NFL Combine/Pro Day

=== Philadelphia Eagles ===
Hook signed with the Philadelphia Eagles as an undrafted free agent on May 2, 2025. The signing reunited him with his former Toledo teammate Quinyon Mitchell. On August 25, he was waived by Philadelphia as a part of final roster cuts.

=== Seattle Seahawks ===
On October 8, 2025, Hook signed with the Seattle Seahawks' practice squad. On February 12, 2026, he signed a reserve/futures contract with Seattle.

Hook was waived by the Seahawks on August 30, 2026, as a part of final roster cuts, and re-signed a day later to the practice squad.
