= Yanar =

Yanar (Turkish for "flammable") is both a feminine given name and a Turkish surname. Notable people with the name include:

== Given name ==
- Yanar Mohammed (1960–2026), Iraqi feminist and women's rights activist

== Surname ==
- Ali Emre Yanar (born 1998), Turkish footballer
- Kaya Yanar (born 1973), German comedian of Turkish descent
- Osman Yanar (born 1953), Turkish judoka
- Ozan Yanar (born 1987), Turkish-born Finnish politician

== See also ==
- Yanar Dagh, a persistent natural fire in Azerbaijan
