= Swimming at the 1976 Summer Olympics – Men's 200 metre backstroke =

Men's 200 metre backstroke at the Games of the XXI Olympiad
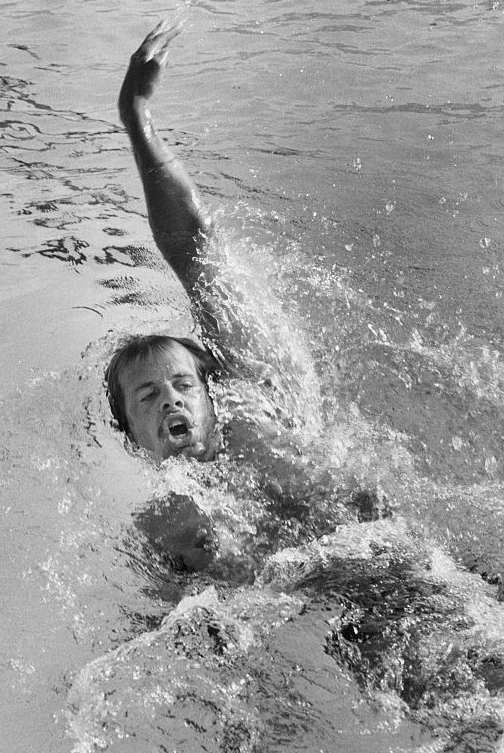
- Gold medalist John Naber
- Venue: Olympic Pool, Montreal
- Date: 24 July 1976 (heats & final)
- Competitors: 33 from 23 nations
- Winning time: 1:59.19 WR

Medalists
1st place, gold medalist(s)		John Naber	United States
2nd place, silver medalist(s)		Peter Rocca	United States
3rd place, bronze medalist(s)		Dan Harrigan	United States

The men's 200 metre backstroke event for the 1976 Summer Olympics was held in Montreal. The event took place on 24 July. There were 33 competitors from 23 nations, with each nation having up to 3 swimmers. The event was won by John Naber of the United States in world-record time; he was the first person to swim the event in under 2 minutes (1:59.19). It was Naber's fifth medal (fourth gold) of the Games: completing a double in the backstroke events as well as golds in the medley relay and the 4×200 free relay, along with a silver in the 200 free. It was the second American victory and second American medal sweep in the men's 200 metre backstroke, after 1968; of the 12 medals from 1968 through 1976, 10 were won by Americans and the other two (both gold) by Roland Matthes. Peter Rocca (silver) and Dan Harrigan (bronze) were the other two Americans, along with Naber, to reach the podium in 1976. The rules changed in 1984 to limit nations to two swimmers each, preventing further sweeps.

== Background ==
This was the fifth appearance of the 200 metre backstroke event. It was first held in 1900. The event did not return until 1964; since then, it has been on the programme at every Summer Games. From 1904 to 1960, a men's 100 metre backstroke was held instead. In 1964, only the 200 metres was held. Beginning in 1968 and ever since, both the 100 and 200 metre versions have been held.

One of the 8 finalists from the 1972 Games returned: seventh-place finisher Zoltán Verrasztó of Hungary. Two-time reigning Olympic champion, world champion, and world record holder from 1970 to a month before the Games Roland Matthes of East Germany was entered in the event but did not start. The favourite was John Naber of the United States, who had broken Matthes' world record at the U.S. Olympic trials as well as beating Matthes in the 100 metre backstroke event five days earlier. Matthes had won the inaugural World Championship in 1973, with Verrasztó second and Naber third; Verrasztó was the World Champion in 1975.

Bulgaria, Poland, and Portugal each made their debut in the event. The Netherlands made its fifth appearance, the only nation to have competed at each appearance of the event to that point (Italy did not compete in the event for the first time).

== Competition format ==
The competition used a two-round (heats and final) format. The advancement rule followed the format introduced in 1952. A swimmer's place in the heat was not used to determine advancement; instead, the fastest times from across all heats in a round were used. There were 5 heats of up to 8 swimmers each. The top 8 swimmers advanced to the final. Swim-offs were used as necessary to break ties.

This swimming event used backstroke. Because an Olympic-size swimming pool is 50 metres long, this race consisted of four lengths of the pool.

== Records ==
These were the standing world and Olympic records (in seconds) prior to the 1964 Summer Olympics.

World record	John Naber (USA)	2:00.64	Long Beach, United States	19 June 1976
Olympic record	Roland Matthes (GDR)	2:02.82	Munich, West Germany	2 September 1972

The heats saw two swimmers break the Olympic record: Dan Harrigan in heat 2, with 2:02.25, then John Naber in heat 5 with 2:02.01. In the final, Naber broke the world record and the 2-minute barrier, swimming 1:59.19. Peter Rocca, in second-place, was also under the previous world record time.

== Schedule ==
All times are Eastern Daylight Time (UTC-4)

Date	Time	Round
Saturday, 24 July 1976	9:30; 20:30	Heats; Final

== Results ==
=== Heats ===
Rank	Heat	Swimmer	Nation	Time	Notes
1	5	John Naber	United States	2:02.01	Q, OR
2	2	Dan Harrigan	United States	2:02.25	Q, OR
3	4	Peter Rocca	United States	2:03.31	Q
4	1	Mark Kerry	Australia	2:03.54	Q
5	4	Mark Tonelli	Australia	2:05.10	Q
6	5	Miloslav Roľko	Czechoslovakia	2:05.33	Q
7	3	Zoltán Verrasztó	Hungary	2:05.93	Q
8	5	Róbert Rudolf	Hungary	2:06.37	Q
9	4	Mike Scarth	Canada	2:07.16	
10	5	Rômulo Arantes Filho	Brazil	2:07.38	
11	2	Leif Ericsson	Sweden	2:07.57	
12	1	Daryl Skilling	Canada	2:07.77	
13	1	Igor Omelchenk'o	Soviet Union	2:07.95	
14	2	Lutz Wanja	East Germany	2:08.02	
15	3	Jim Carter	Great Britain	2:08.05	
16	3	Steve Hardy	Canada	2:08.56	
17	1	Santiago Esteva	Spain	2:08.63	
18	2	Reinhold Becker	West Germany	2:09.54	
19	3	Krasimir Stoykov	Bulgaria	2:09.67	
20	4	José Urueta	Mexico	2:09.74	
21	5	Conrado Porta	Argentina	2:09.75	
22	2	Ivan Mikolutsky	Soviet Union	2:09.78	
23	5	Peter Lerpiniere	Great Britain	2:09.88	
24	3	Ignacio Álvarez	Mexico	2:11.08	
25	1	Carlos Berrocal	Puerto Rico	2:11.14	
26	2	Nenad Miloš	Yugoslavia	2:11.25	
27	3	Karim Ressang	Netherlands	2:11.25	
28	4	Predrag Miloš	Yugoslavia	2:12.21	
29	1	Ryszard Żugaj	Poland	2:12.53	
30	4	Thomas Hofer	Switzerland	2:12.75	
31	5	Gerardo Rosario	Philippines	2:13.89	
32	2	Chiang Jin Choon	Malaysia	2:21.04	
33	1	António de Melo	Portugal	2:26.65	

=== Final ===
Naber set a strong pace to start, hitting the 50-metre turn at 27.73—already a full second ahead of Rocca and Harrigan. Naber's second turn, at 100 metres, came at 57.45 (which would have been 5th place in the 100 metre final) and pushed his lead further. In the final 50 metres, Rocca closed the lead somewhat; he finished with what would have been a new world record except that he was still 1.36 seconds behind Naber.

Rank	Swimmer	Nation	Time	Notes
1st place, gold medalist(s)	John Naber	United States	1:59.19	WR
2nd place, silver medalist(s)	Peter Rocca	United States	2:00.55	
3rd place, bronze medalist(s)	Dan Harrigan	United States	2:01.35	
4	Mark Tonelli	Australia	2:03.17	
5	Mark Kerry	Australia	2:04.07	
6	Miloslav Roľko	Czechoslovakia	2:05.81	
7	Róbert Rudolf	Hungary	2:07.30	
8	Zoltán Verrasztó	Hungary	2:08.23	
