= New Palestine High School =

Location
- 4485 S Victory Dr; New Palestine, Hancock County, Indiana 46163; United States; 39.718653°N 85.890571°W

Information
- Type: Public high school
- Established: 1919
- School district: New Palestine Community Schools
- Principal: James Voelz
- Teaching staff: 72.50 (on an FTE basis)
- Grades: 9-12
- Enrollment: 1,254 (2024–2025)
- Student to teacher ratio: 17.30
- Colors: Red and white
- Athletics conference: Hoosier Heritage Conference
- Mascot: Dragon
- Newspaper: Crimson Messenger
- Yearbook: Avalon
- Website: NPHS

New Palestine High School is a suburban public high school (grades 9–12) located in New Palestine, Indiana, managed by the New Palestine Community Schools. As of the 2024–2025 school year it serves 1,216 students and employed 61 faculty members.

New Palestine High School was named an Indiana Four Star School by the Indiana Department of Education for the 2018–2019 academic year. In 2012, it was named a National Blue Ribbon School by the United States Department of Education.

New Palestine High School serves suburban and rural communities. It has students from the communities of Finly A.K.A Carrolton, New Palestine, Gem, Sugar Creek, Philadelphia and Fountaintown.

== Athletics and extracurricular activities ==
New Palestine High School is part of the Hoosier Heritage Conference and offers soccer, tennis, cross country, American football, golf, volleyball, basketball, gymnastics, swimming, wrestling, baseball, softball and track and field. In addition, New Palestine High School has award-winning marching band, choir and journalism programs.

New Palestine has won eleven IHSAA state championships: in baseball (2004), softball (2004, 2008, 2009, 2017, 2018, 2019), and football (2014, 2018, 2019, 2024). In addition, the Dragons have had State Finals appearances in baseball (2003, 2004), softball (2003, 2004, 2006, 2008, 2009, 2017, 2018, 2024) and football (1990, 2014, 2015, 2018, 2019, 2024), as well as team state finals appearances in golf and gymnastics. NPHS also has eight individual IHSAA state championships, won by Kyle Ulrey (1), Chad Red (4) and Alec White (1) in wrestling, as well as Lori Swegman (1, 880 yard run) and Samuel Voelz (1, 800 meter run) in track and field.

A former football coach, Marvin Shepler, is a member of the Indiana Football Hall of Fame and a former basketball coach, Fred Keesling, is a member of the Indiana Basketball Hall of Fame, and the IHSAA's Mental Attitude Award for boys' golf is named for him. Former football player, Todd Yoder, was also inducted in the Indiana Football Hall of Fame in 2015. Former assistant football coach Gary Scott is also a member of the Indiana Football Hall of Fame.

== Notable graduates ==
- Angela Ahrendts (1977), former CEO of Burberry
- Matt Canada (1990), NFL and college football coach
- Todd Yoder (1996), NFL player
- Kent Raymond (2004), basketball player who played overseas
- Patrick Feeney (2009), track & field athlete
- Maxen Hook (2020), NFL player
- Ian Moore (2024), college football player
