= John Adams High School (Indiana) =

Public school in Indiana, United States

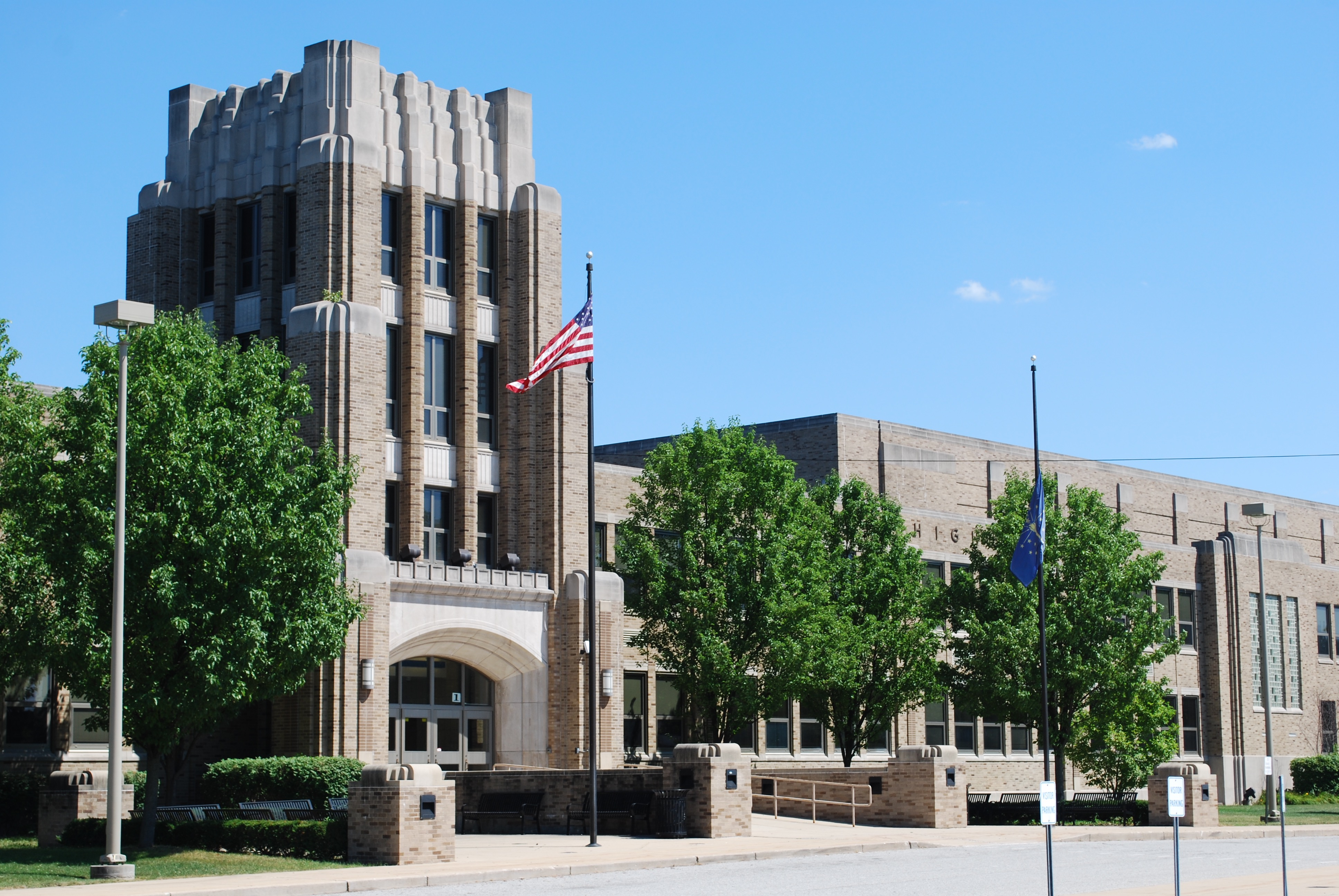

Location
- 808 S. Twyckenham Drive; South Bend, St. Joseph County County, Indiana 46615; United States; 41.667025°N 86.222848°W

Information
- Type: Public high school
- Established: 1940
- School district: South Bend Community School Corporation
- Principal: James Seitz
- Teaching staff: 133.95 (FTE)
- Grades: 9-12
- Enrollment: 1,987 (2023-2024)
- Student to teacher ratio: 14.83
- Colors: Red, blue, and white
- Athletics conference: Northern Indiana Athletic Conference
- Team name: Eagles
- Gym Capacity: 2250
- Website: Official Website

John Adams High School (often referred to simply as Adams) is a public high school in South Bend, Indiana.

== Location ==
The campus is located between the River Park and Sunnymede neighborhoods in South Bend, Indiana. The neighborhood is on the east side of town, and Adams is referred to as "The Pride of the East Side". The school sits on around 20 acres (81,000 m^{2}) across from Indiana University South Bend.

School Field, the home stadium for Adams football, is on the other side of the Sunnymede neighborhood, next to Jefferson Intermediate School.

== History ==
John Adams High School opened on September 30, 1940, as part of a program sponsored by the Federal Works Agency and the Public Works Administration. The school opened late due to the polio epidemic of the 1930s. The school auditorium was once the only large performing stage in South Bend. It has been the site of many historical events and performers such as the premiere screening of Knute Rockne, All American, concerts by Kate Smith, Ezio Pinza and the Chicago Symphony Orchestra, a taping of The Fred Waring Show and a speech by John Wooden.

Selected scenes from the movie Rudy were filmed in John Adams High School.

The school's 2008–2009 enrollment was approximately 2000, which made it the second-largest high school in the South Bend metropolitan area. The mock trial team at Adams won two national titles, in 2009 and 2011, as well as 16 state titles, making it the most successful competitive high school mock trial program in state history.

== State and national recognition ==
John Adams Athletics has a total of 27 Indiana state championships and 2 national championships.

Seven sports have won state championships, and the mock trial program has won two national championships.

State champions	Years
Boys wrestling	1966
Boys swimming	1966, 1967, 1968
Girls swimming	1972
Boys golf	1973
Boys tennis	1975
Volleyball	1977, 1979
Mock trial	1998, 1999, 2001, 2002, 2003, 2004, 2005, 2006, 2007, 2008, 2009, 2010, 2011, 2012, 2013, 2015, 2016, 2017, 2020
National champions	Years
Mock trial	2009, 2011

In 1966, the football team was ranked 3rd in Indiana state rankings and 9th nationally.

In the 1972–1973 season, the boys basketball team finished 2nd in Indiana state tournament.

In the 1978–1979 season, the boys basketball team was ranked 1st in every Indiana regular season poll.

In 1994, boys soccer was changed to a unified state tournament, allowing all Indiana teams to compete on the same level for a state championship. The Adams boys team won their sectional, regional and semi-state games. They were victorious in the first game of the final four, but after a loss in the championship game, they finished the season as state runner-up.

In 2012, the basketball team won a sectional title and defeated the Lake Central Indians in the regional semifinals. The following school year the football team, coached by Craig Redman, compiled a 9–3 record, equaling the school record for wins. Coach Redman won conference coach of the year in football, as well as wrestling. The basketball team again won a sectional title. Along the way they defeated Penn, Mishawaka Marian, and New Haven, all teams who had players committed to play basketball at Notre Dame.

== Fine arts ==
- Orchestra
- Choir
- Marching Band
- Indoor Percussion
- Concert band
- Jazz band
- Football Team Dancing

== Academics ==
- Adams students have garnered grants and awards totaling over two million dollars. Recent awards include the two winners of the Indiana Academy of Science State Competition. Also, in 2010, the program produced an Intel Science Talent Search finalist.

== IB program ==
John Adams began offering the IB Program in May, 2006. Adams was the first inner-city school to offer the program, and remains the only South Bend high school to do so. The IB two-year program is among the most rigorous academic programs of study available to high school students. IB test scores for Adams students in 2009 were above the world average in 6 out of the 10 tests.

Budget cuts proposed in early 2010 by the South Bend Community School Corporation that would have raised the cost to families of some IB testing fees were reduced or eliminated in March 2010.

== Notable alumni ==
- Robert Eugene Brashers was a serial killer who perpetrated the 1991 Austin yogurt shop murders.
- Paul Koscielski is a former professional tennis player who won three consecutive IHSAA state singles titles from 1982 to 1984 for the Eagles. Koscielski went on to captain the Texas Longhorns men's team in the NCAA and achieved a career-high ranking of 254th in the world.
- Gita Pullapilly is a Hollywood film director, screenwriter, and producer. Nominated for an Emmy; Guggenheim Fellow. Co-wrote and co-directed the comedy, Queenpins, starring Kristen Bell, Vince Vaughn, Paul Walter Hauser, and Kirby Howell Baptiste.
- Danny Pinter played for Ball State Cardinals football (2015–2019) and 5th Round pick Offensive guard for the Indianapolis Colts.
- Anthony Johnson (1986) – former NFL running back for Jacksonville Jaguars (2000), Carolina Panthers (1995–1999), Chicago Bears (1995), New York Jets (1994) and Indianapolis Colts (1990–1993); played for Notre Dame Fighting Irish football team (1986–1989).
- Tom Ehlers (1970) – former NFL linebacker for Philadelphia Eagles (1975–1977) and Buffalo Bills (1978); played for Kentucky Wildcats football team.
- Isiah Whitlock Jr. (1972) – actor, best known for his role as Clay Davis on the HBO television series The Wire.
- Dan Harrigan (1974) – bronze medalist in men's 200-meter backstroke at 1976 Summer Olympics.

== See also ==
- List of high schools in Indiana
