= Ian Moore (American football) =

American football player (born 2005)

No. 69 – Ohio State Buckeyes
- Position: Offensive tackle
- Class: Redshirt Sophomore

Personal information
- Born: September 14, 2005 (age 21)
- Listed height: 6 ft 6 in (1.98 m)
- Listed weight: 315 lb (143 kg)

Career information
- High school: New Palestine (New Palestine, Indiana)
- College: Ohio State (2024–present)

Awards and highlights
- CFP national champion (2024)
- Stats at ESPN

Ian Moore (born September 14, 2005) is an American football offensive tackle for the Ohio State Buckeyes.

== Early life ==
Moore attended New Palestine High School in New Palestine, Indiana. He was rated as a four-star recruit and the 138th overall player in the class of 2024 by 247Sports. Moore committed to play college football for the Ohio State Buckeyes over offers from Florida State, Indiana, Miami, Notre Dame, Penn State, Tennessee, and Wisconsin.

== College career ==
As a freshman in 2024, Moore appeared in four games and was redshirted. In week 11 of the 2025 season, he made his first collegiate start against Purdue. During the 2025 season, Moore appeared in all 14 games while making one start for the Buckeyes. He entered the 2026 season as the Buckeyes' starting left tackle.
