= Héctor Rodríguez (judoka) =

Cuban judoka (born 1951)

Personal information
- Full name: Héctor Rodríguez Torres
- Born: 12 August 1951 (age 74)
- Occupation: Judoka

Sport
- Country: Cuba
- Sport: Judo
- Weight class: ‍–‍63 kg, ‍–‍65 kg

Achievements and titles
- Olympic Games: (gold) (1976)
- World Champ.: (bronze) (1973)
Medal record
Men's judo
Representing Cuba
Olympic Games
Gold medal – first place	1976 Montreal	‍–‍63 kg
World Championships
Bronze medal – third place	1973 Lausanne	‍–‍63 kg
Pan American Games
Silver medal – second place	1975 Mexico City	‍–‍63 kg
Bronze medal – third place	1979 San Juan	‍–‍65 kg

Profile at external databases
- IJF: 54355
- JudoInside.com: 989
- Updated on 21 June 2023

Héctor Rodríguez Torres (born 12 August 1951) is a Cuban judoka and Olympic champion. He won a gold medal at the 1976 Summer Olympics in Montreal by defeating South Korea's Chang Eun-kyung in the final.
