= Suicidal empathy =

Theory of pathological and excessive empathy

Suicidal empathy is a purported phenomenon in which excessive, misdirected and pathological forms of empathy are destructive for the party that exhibits them. Proponents of the concept claim it happens through prioritizing compassion before commitment, understanding before alignment, and most simply – empathy over logic and long-term consequences.

== Definition and popularization ==
The term was popularized by Canadian marketing professor Gad Saad in his book Suicidal Empathy: Dying to Be Kind. According to Saad, suicidal empathy is the inability to implement optimal decisions when one is psychologically conditioned to prioritize empathy or displays of empathy over a rational course of action. He argues that suicidal empathy prioritizes minority groups such as illegal immigrants at the expense of survival and security of one's own groups and values. For example, Saad argues that in the United States, soldiers fighting for the country receive much less empathy than immigrant gang members. He associates the concept with the morals of Aesop's fables The Farmer and the Viper and The Scorpion and the Frog.

The Wall Street Journal linked Saad to Elon Musk, claiming the two had a 'public bromance'. Musk's usage of the term popularized it. In a 2025 interview with podcaster Joe Rogan, Musk uses the phrase "civilizational suicidal empathy" to refer to the alleged corrosion of American culture. According to Musk, suicidal empathy refers to weaponized empathy to bring about political and policy modifications.

== Usage ==
The term is sometimes used by right-wing commentators including Tommy Robinson, Benny Johnson, and Nick Shirley, political figures including Mike Lee, Ron DeSantis, and Randy Fine, and Christian nationalist figures to criticize empathy toward groups such as immigrants and non-white racial groups. In this context, it is sometimes linked to the Great Replacement conspiracy theory.

Iain Macwhirter has compared Britain's net zero strategy to suicidal empathy, arguing that the UK was undermining its own energy security and industrial base.

Writing for The Bulwark in early 2026, Cathy Young said the phrase was "becoming a right-wing buzzword".

== Reception ==
Pope Francis criticized JD Vance in 2025 for citing the medieval Catholic doctrine of ordo amoris to justify the withholding of empathy for migrants. However, American theologian R. R. Reno wrote in an article titled "JD Vance is Right about the 'Ordo Amoris'" that "We should love our family first, then our neighbors, then love our community, then our country, and only then consider the interests of the rest of the world." The news magazine Salon called the portrayal of empathy as a weapon an "overt assault" on what is a "natural virtue" of human beings. The magazine Eureka Street criticized Elon Musk for using the term "suicidal empathy" as a way to say "barbarians" are going to threaten "the American way of life".

Historian of psychology Susan Lanzonia stated that she has never perceived a vilification of empathy as reflected in "current sources". Lanzonia believes that the disparagement of the concept of empathy is a structured attempt to dehumanize people who might be in need of it.

The Guardian discussed Saad's book among other works critical of empathy, characterizing the topic as a right-wing effort "...to dismantle and discredit one of the essential tools for any society – our capacity to recognize and respond to suffering. We should see the campaign against empathy by Trump supporters for what it is: a flashing red light warning of fascist intent." Gad Saad's book Suicidal Empathy: Dying to Be Kind debuted at #1 on the New York Times' Combined Print & E-Book Nonfiction sales chart.

== See also ==
- Virtue signalling
- Hyper-empathy
- Empathy gap
- Empathy-altruism
- Danger to rescuer
- Paradox of tolerance
- Stockholm syndrome
- Useful idiot
- Xenocentrism
- Turkeys voting for Christmas
- Camp of the Saints
