= Pakit Santhisiri =

Thai judoka

Personal information
- Nationality: Thai
- Born: 11 September 1948 (age 76)

Sport
- Sport: Judo

Pakit Santhisiri (born 11 September 1948) is a Thai judoka. He competed in the men's lightweight event at the 1976 Summer Olympics.
