= Constantine Alexander =

British judoka

Personal information
- Nationality: British
- Born: 8 April 1950 (age 75)

Sport
- Sport: Judo

Constantine Alexander (born 8 April 1950) is a British judoka. He competed in the men's lightweight event at the 1976 Summer Olympics.
