= Peintner =

Peintner is a German surname. Notable people with the surname include:

- Elmar Peintner (born 1954), Austrian contemporary artist
- Markus Peintner (born 1980), Austrian ice hockey player
- Paula Peintner (born ?), Italian luger

== See also ==
- Pointner
