= Peter Lerpiniere =

British swimmer

Personal information
- Nationality: British
- Born: 3 February 1957 (age 69)

Sport
- Sport: Swimming

Peter Lerpiniere (born 3 February 1957) is a male British former swimmer. Lerpiniere competed in the men's 200 metre backstroke at the 1976 Summer Olympics. At the ASA National British Championships he won the 200 metres backstroke title in 1975 and 1976.

Lerpiniere attended Millfield School from 1971 to 1976. After his swimming career he completed 30 years Police Service, a further 6 years training recruits and then as a lecturer at Canterbury Christ Church University teaching in the School of Law, Criminal Justice and Computing.
