= Daryl Skilling =

Canadian swimmer

Personal information
- Born: 17 May 1960 (age 66) Port Kembla, New South Wales, Australia

Sport
- Sport: Swimming
Medal record
Representing Canada
Pan American Games
Silver medal – second place	1975 Mexico City	4x100m medley relay

Daryl Skilling (born 17 May 1960) is a Canadian former swimmer. He competed in the men's 200 metre backstroke at the 1976 Summer Olympics.
