= Warren Richards =

Australian judoka

Personal information
- Nationality: Australian
- Born: 4 July 1950 (age 74)

Sport
- Sport: Judo

Warren Richards (born 4 July 1950) is an Australian judoka. He competed in the men's lightweight event at the 1976 Summer Olympics. He attended Newington College from 1960 until 1966.

In January 2000, as a former Olympian, Richards applied to be a torchbearer in the 2000 Summer Olympics torch relay. His invitation was withdrawn when the organising committee learned that he was imprisoned at Long Bay Jail on a drug trafficking conviction.
