= Kamal Al-Athari =

Kuwaiti judoka

Personal information
- Nationality: Kuwaiti
- Born: 18 July 1959 (age 66)

Sport
- Sport: Judo

Kamal Al-Athari (born 18 July 1959) is a Kuwaiti judoka. He competed in the men's lightweight event at the 1976 Summer Olympics.

Al-Athari was in 1976 among the first Judoka that represented Kuwait at the Olympics.
