= Gad Saad =

Canadian marketing academic (born 1964)

- جاد سعد
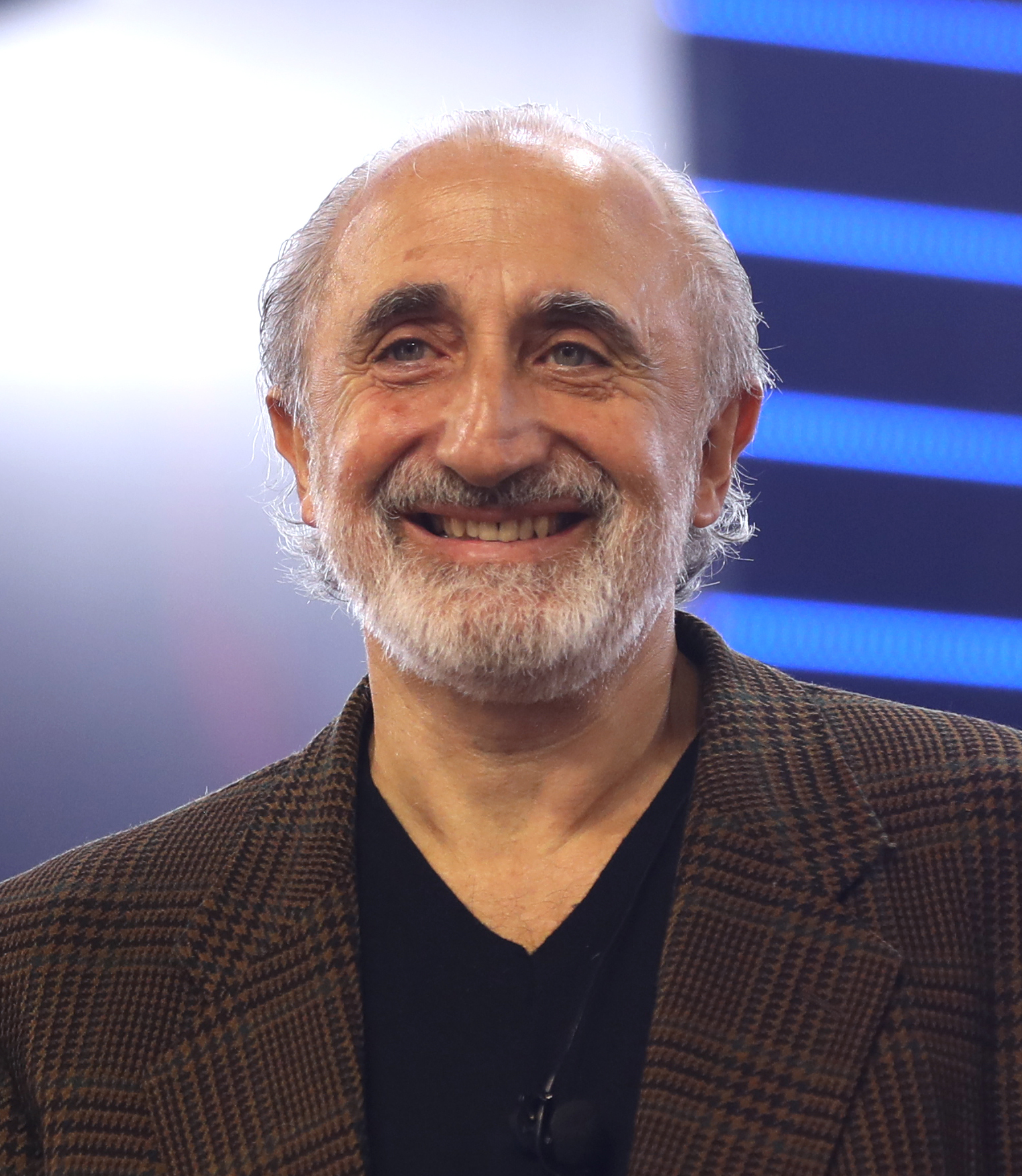
- Saad in 2023
- Born: 13 October 1964 (age 62); Beirut, Lebanon
- Citizenship: Canada

Academic background
- Education: McGill University (BSc, MBA); Cornell University (MS, PhD)
- Thesis: The Adaptive Use of Stopping Policies in Sequential Consumer Choice (1994)
- Doctoral advisor: Edward Russo

Academic work
- Discipline: Business
- Sub-discipline: Marketing
- Institutions: Concordia University; University of Mississippi
- Main interests: Consumer behaviour; evolutionary psychology
- Notable ideas: Suicidal empathy

YouTube information
- Channel: GadSaad
- Subscribers: 348 thousand
- Views: 40.4 million
- Last updated: September 16, 2025
- Website: gadsaad.com

Gad Saad (Note: Pronounced /ˈɡæd ˈsæd/. Arabic: جاد سعد; Hebrew: גד סעד.) (born 13 October 1964) is a Canadian marketing professor, currently at the University of Mississippi, and formerly at the John Molson School of Business at Concordia University in Montreal. He has argued for applying evolutionary psychology to marketing and consumer behaviour. He wrote a blog for Psychology Today and hosts a podcast titled The Saad Truth.

== Early life and education ==
Saad was born on October 13, 1964, in Beirut, Lebanon, to a family of both Lebanese Jewish and Syrian Jewish descent. His family was part of the shrinking Jewish population in Lebanon, which had fallen from around 20,000 to only 3,000 from 1940 to 1960. While most of his extended family had already fled the country, Saad and his immediate family left in October 1975 for Montreal, Canada to escape the Lebanese Civil War.

Saad recalled in an interview with Spiked that following then Egyptian president Gamal Abdel Nasser's death in 1970, there was a demonstration in Beirut chanting slogans like "death to the Jews," which led his family to hide in fear. Saad says that when he was about nine or ten, a classmate of his who knew that he was Jewish announced to the class that he wanted to be a "Jew killer" when he grew up, a proclamation which was met with applause and laughter from Saad's classmates. Saad said the teacher took no action in response.

Saad's elder brother, David, is a national judo champion who competed at the 1976 Summer Olympics in Montreal for Lebanon. His nephew, Ariel Helwani, is a mixed martial arts journalist.

Saad obtained a bachelor's degree in mathematics and computer science in 1988 and an MBA in marketing in 1990 from McGill University. He then earned a master's degree in management in 1993 and a PhD in marketing in 1994 from Cornell University. His doctoral thesis, The Adaptive Use of Stopping Policies in Sequential Consumer Choice, was supervised by Edward Russo.

Saad is an atheist who describes himself as culturally Jewish.

== Career ==
Saad had been a professor of marketing at Concordia University in Montreal, since 1994. From 2008 until 2018, he held the Concordia University Research Chair in Evolutionary Behavioural Sciences and Darwinian Consumption. He has held visiting professorships at Cornell University, Dartmouth College, University of California, Irvine, and Northwood University.

He was an associate editor for the journal Evolutionary Psychology from 2012 to 2015. He is an advisory fellow for the Centre for Inquiry Canada. Saad wrote a blog for Psychology Today titled Homo Consumericus from 2008 until 2020, and contributed to The Wall Street Journal in 2011.

Saad hosts a YouTube show titled The Saad Truth. His channel has received more than 40 million views.

In May 2026, he announced he was leaving Montreal to take a position at the Declaration of Independence Center at the University of Mississippi.

=== Research ===
Saad has researched how hormones affect and are affected by consumer behavior, such as how conspicuous consumption affects testosterone levels, how testosterone levels affect risk-taking, and how hormones in the menstrual cycle affect buying decisions.

== Views ==
Saad has long publicly argued against political correctness and social justice activism, which he believes limits academia. In 2017, he provided testimony to the Canadian Senate Committee on Legal and Constitutional Affairs arguing against Bill C-16 which added gender expression and gender identity as protected grounds to the Canadian Human Rights Act. More recently he has argued against what he calls "wokeism", especially with regards to transgender people.

Saad coined the phrase suicidal empathy, which he defines as a form of empathy that has the potential to cause the destruction of the party exhibiting it. The concept has been criticized, by Valerie Stivers, senior editor at UnHerd, as "fake science" and somewhere between "off-putting and hateful". Matthew d'Ancona described Saad's rhetoric around the term as "spectacularly divisive".

Saad has been critical of immigration from Islamic countries to Western countries. The Council on American–Islamic Relations and the Global Project Against Hate and Extremism have accused Saad of promoting hostility towards Muslims. Saad has endorsed an inflated estimate of grooming gang victims in the United Kingdom to denounce Muslim immigrants.

Saad is critical of Jewish anti-Zionists, calling them “the most execrable of all anti-Zionists.” Saad refers to Jewish anti-Zionists as "wood cricket Jews", a reference to wood crickets who are parasitized by hair worms into drowning themselves. Saad holds a recurring segment on his podcast where he names a "Wood Cricket Jew of the Week" criticizing Jews he believes are acting against Jewish interests. For instance, Saad has referred to actor Mandy Patinkin as a "Self-Loathing Degenerate, Lobotomized Wood Cricket Jew". During a speech at the World Symposium Against Antizionism, Saad called upon the audience to name "degenerate wood crickets." Saad named Gabor Maté, a critic of Israeli policies towards Palestinians, as an example. Saad called it a "stretch" to call Maté, who was removed from his family as an infant to escape the Nazis, a Holocaust survivor. “If he is a Holocaust survivor, then I too am a Holocaust survivor, because in the 1940s I was swimming in my dad’s testicles as a spermatozoa,” Saad said.

== Leaving Canada ==
In May 2026, Saad said on The Joe Rogan Experience podcast that he and his family were moving to Oxford, Mississippi, due to Canada's tax system and immigration policies. On June 18, 2026, in a post on X Saad wrote: "I decided to leave Quebec/Canada because: 1) the taxation system is astounding, rendering it nearly impossible to accumulate enough money to truly retire" and "2) the government's open immigration policies have made it unsafe for my family to remain here (due to the exponential increase in Jew-hatred)."

In an interview with the Cleveland Jewish News, posted on September 2, 2026, Saad attributed the rise of "Jew-hatred" in Canada to "the immigration policies of the government of Quebec". Saad also expressed his intent to go "shooting soon" in Mississippi as he would have the "dignity to defend himself".

== Bibliography ==
=== Books ===
- Saad, G. (2007). The Evolutionary Bases of Consumption. Mahwah, NJ: Lawrence Erlbaum. ISBN 9780805851502. Book review
- Saad, G. (ed.) (2011). Evolutionary Psychology in the Business Sciences. Springer: Heidelberg, Germany. ISBN 9783540927839. Book review
- Saad, G. (2011). The Consuming Instinct: What Juicy Burgers, Ferraris, Pornography, and Gift Giving Reveal About Human Nature. Amherst, NY: Prometheus Books. ISBN 9781616144296. Book review
- Saad, G. (2020). The Parasitic Mind: How Infectious Ideas Are Killing Common Sense. Washington, DC: Regnery Publishing. ISBN 9781621579595.
- Saad, G. (2023). The Saad Truth About Happiness: 8 Secrets for Leading the Good Life. Washington, DC: Regnery Publishing. ISBN 9781684515288.
- Saad, G. (2026). Suicidal Empathy: Dying to Be Kind. New York, NY: Broadside Books. ISBN 9780063446533.
