= Danny Pinter =

American football player (born 1996)

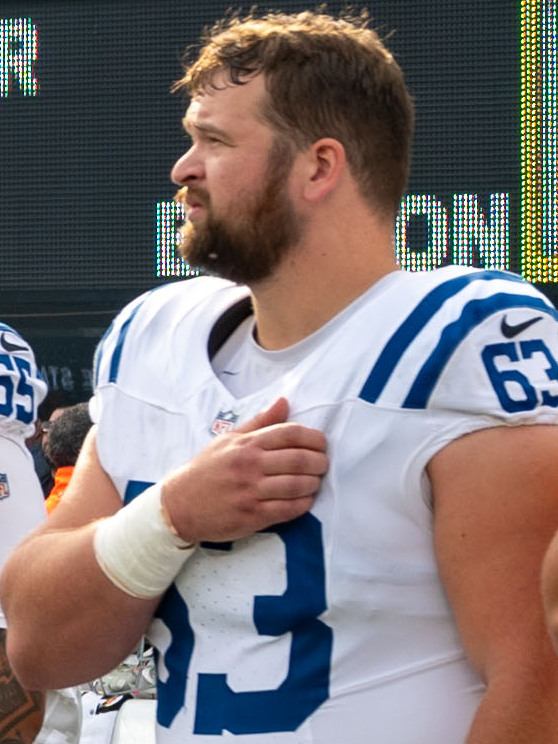
- Pinter with the Indianapolis Colts in 2024

No. 63 – Baltimore Ravens
- Position: Center
- Roster status: Injured reserve

Personal information
- Born: June 19, 1996 (age 30); South Bend, Indiana, U.S.
- Listed height: 6 ft 4 in (1.93 m)
- Listed weight: 310 lb (141 kg)

Career information
- High school: John Adams (South Bend)
- College: Ball State (2015–2019)
- NFL draft: 2020: 5th round, 149th overall pick

Career history
- Indianapolis Colts (2020–2025); Baltimore Ravens (2026–present)

Awards and highlights
- First-team All-MAC (2019)

Career NFL statistics as of 2025
- Games played: 77
- Games started: 10
- Stats at Pro Football Reference

Daniel James Pinter (born June 19, 1996) is an American professional football center for the Baltimore Ravens of the National Football League (NFL). He played college football for the Ball State Cardinals. Pinter is the brother of Noblesville Fire Department lieutenant Matt Pinter, who is the department's longest-serving "Firefighter of the Year."

== College career ==
Coming out of Adams High School, located in his hometown of South Bend, Indiana, Pinter was recruited to Ball State to play tight end. He transitioned to offensive tackle as a sophomore. After his senior season, he was named Ball State's most outstanding player. He was an All-Mid-American Conference first-team honoree. Pinter played in the 2020 NFLPA Collegiate Bowl in Pasadena, California.

== Professional career ==
Pre-draft measurables
Height	Weight	Arm length	Hand span	Wingspan	40-yard dash	10-yard split	20-yard split	20-yard shuttle	Three-cone drill	Vertical jump	Broad jump	Bench press	Wonderlic
6 ft 4 1/4 in (1.94 m)	306 lb (139 kg)	31 7/8 in (0.81 m)	9 1/2 in (0.24 m)	6 ft 5 7/8 in (1.98 m)	4.91 s	1.73 s	2.87 s	4.62 s	7.76 s	29.5 in (0.75 m)	9 ft 2 in (2.79 m)	24 reps	27
All values from NFL Combine

=== Indianapolis Colts ===
Pinter was selected by the Indianapolis Colts with the 149th overall pick in the fifth round of the 2020 NFL draft.

Pinter got his first playing time as a rookie at center on September 26, 2020, against the New York Jets when the Colts relieved the left side of their starting offensive line once victory was imminent.

Pinter caught his first career NFL touchdown in a Thursday Night Football game against the Jets from Carson Wentz on November 4, 2021.

On August 29, 2023, Pinter was placed on injured reserve.

On March 19, 2024, Pinter signed a one-year contract extension with the Colts.

=== Baltimore Ravens ===
On March 26, 2026, Pinter signed a one-year contract with a maximum value of $2.75 million with the Baltimore Ravens. On August 20, Pinter suffered a knee injury during practice, which was later revealed to be a torn patellar tendon, which prematurely ended his season. On August 26, Pinter was placed on injured reserve.
