= József Tuncsik =

Hungarian judoka (born 1949)

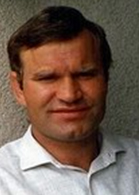

Personal information
- Born: 23 September 1949 (age 76)
- Occupation: Judoka

Sport
- Country: Hungary
- Sport: Judo
- Weight class: ‍–‍63 kg, ‍–‍65 kg

Achievements and titles
- Olympic Games: (bronze) (1976)
- European Champ.: (gold) (1976)
Medal record
Men's judo
Representing Hungary
Olympic Games
Bronze medal – third place	1976 Montreal	‍–‍63 kg
European Championships
Gold medal – first place	1976 Kyiv	‍–‍63 kg
Bronze medal – third place	1978 Helsinki	‍–‍65 kg

Profile at external databases
- IJF: 54343
- JudoInside.com: 5291
- Updated on 21 June 2023

József Tuncsik (born 23 September 1949 in Debrecen) is a Hungarian former judoka who competed in the 1976 Summer Olympics. Hungarian Champion, 1972, 1973, 1974, 1975, 1977. European Champion at the 1976 European Championships, Kiev.
