= Todd Yoder =

American football player (born 1978)

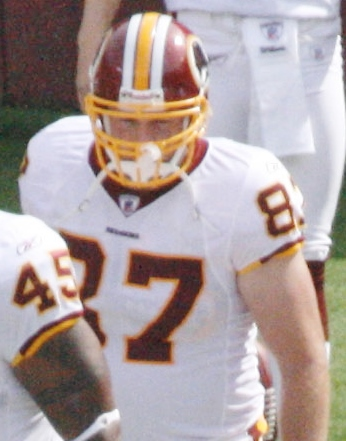
- Yoder in 2008

No. 80, 83, 87
- Position: Tight end

Personal information
- Born: March 18, 1978 (age 48); New Palestine, Indiana, U.S.
- Listed height: 6 ft 4 in (1.93 m)
- Listed weight: 262 lb (119 kg)

Career information
- High school: New Palestine
- College: Vanderbilt
- NFL draft: 2000: undrafted

Career history
- Tampa Bay Buccaneers (2000–2003); Jacksonville Jaguars (2004–2005); Washington Redskins (2006–2009)

Awards and highlights
- Super Bowl champion (XXXVII)

Career NFL statistics
- Receptions: 48
- Receiving yards: 460
- Receiving touchdowns: 8
- Stats at Pro Football Reference

Todd Matthew Yoder (born March 18, 1978) is an American former professional football player who was a tight end in the National Football League (NFL). Yoder was signed as an undrafted free agent by the Tampa Bay Buccaneers in 2000. He played college football for the Vanderbilt Commodores. He was also a member of the Jacksonville Jaguars and Washington Redskins. He now resides in Clearwater, Florida, coaching high school football at Calvary Christian High School.

== Early life ==
Yoder attended New Palestine High School in New Palestine, Indiana, where he lettered in football, basketball, and track. In football, he was an All-State running back as a senior, after he rushed for 1,219 yards and made 14 receptions for 12 touchdowns. He played wide receiver as a junior and sophomore.

== College career ==
Yoder was a four-year letterman at Vanderbilt and posted 80 career receptions for 1,267 yards and eight touchdowns, during those four years. He caught 25 passes for 361 yards and two touchdowns as a senior. He was named to the SEC's Goodworks Team as a junior. He finished second on the team with 21 receptions during sophomore season. Todd was named to the freshman All-SEC after leading the Commodores in receiving with 21 catches for 471 yards and three touchdowns, and his first collegiate catch was a 50-yard touchdown reception versus Notre Dame. He graduated with a degree in chemistry.

== Professional career ==
In his career, he has 48 catches 460 yards and eight touchdowns. Years previous to joining the Washington Redskins, Yoder had only caught two touchdown passes.

== Radio career ==
While a member of the Tampa Bay Buccaneers, Yoder co-hosted "The Todd Yoder Show" with radio host Randy Harris. The program was broadcast weekly, usually from a different venue throughout Tampa Bay, in front of a live audience.
