= Yoshiharu Minami =

Japanese judoka (born 1951)

Personal information
- Nationality: Japanese
- Born: 10 September 1951 Hiroshima, Japan
- Died: 29 December 2024 (aged 73)
- Occupation: Judoka

Sport
- Sport: Judo

Profile at external databases
- JudoInside.com: 5426

Yoshiharu Minami (南 喜陽, Minami Yoshiharu; 10 September 1951 – 29 December 2024) was a Japanese judoka. He competed in the men's lightweight event at the 1976 Summer Olympics. He was World Champion in 1973 and 1975, and Asia Champion in 1974.
