= Enrique del Valle =

Ecuadorian judoka (born 1958)

Personal information
- Nationality: Ecuadorian
- Born: 22 July 1958 (age 66)

Sport
- Sport: Judo

Enrique del Valle (born 22 July 1958) is an Ecuadorian judoka. He competed in the men's lightweight event at the 1976 Summer Olympics.
