= David Saad =

Lebanese judoka (born 1954)

Personal information
- Born: 15 October 1954 (age 72) Beirut, Lebanon
- Occupation: Judoka

Sport
- Country: Lebanon
- Sport: Judo
- Weight class: ‍–‍63 kg

Achievements and titles
- Olympic Games: R32 (1976)
- World Champ.: R64 (1975)

Profile at external databases
- IJF: 54346
- JudoInside.com: 89538
- Updated on 17 June 2024

David Saad (born 15 October 1954) is a Lebanese judoka. He competed in the men's lightweight event at the 1976 Summer Olympics. He also competed in the 1975 World Judo Championships.

== Biography ==
Born to Lebanese Jews and Syrian Jews who had to emigrate from Lebanon to Canada due to antisemitism, Saad studied computer science in which he had a DEUG from the University of Paris-Sud, a BSc from Concordia University, an MSc.A. from McGill University, and a PhD from the University of Paris-Sud.

His younger brother, Gad Saad, is a Lebanese-Canadian evolutionary behavioural scientist at the John Molson School of Business. His nephew is Ariel Helwani, who is a Canadian mixed martial arts (MMA) journalist.
