= Manuel Luna (judoka) =

Venezuelan judoka (born 1945)

Personal information
- Nationality: Venezuelan
- Born: 14 August 1945 (age 80)

Sport
- Sport: Judo

Achievements and titles
- Olympic finals: 1976 Summer Olympics

Manuel Luna (born 14 August 1945) is a Venezuelan former judoka. He competed in the men's lightweight event at the 1976 Summer Olympics.
