= Dan Harrigan =

American swimmer (born 1955)

Personal information
- Full name: Daniel Lee Harrigan
- National team: United States
- Born: October 29, 1955 (age 70) South Bend, Indiana, U.S.
- Height: 6 ft 0 in (1.83 m)
- Weight: 170 lb (77 kg)

Sport
- Sport: Swimming
- Strokes: Backstroke, Freestyle
- Club: Michiana Marlins
- College team: North Carolina State University
- Coach: Don Easterling (NCSU)
Medal record
Representing the United States
Olympic Games
Bronze medal – third place	1976 Montreal	200 m backstroke
Pan American Games
Gold medal – first place	1975 Mexico City	200 m backstroke

Daniel Lee Harrigan (born October 29, 1955) is an American former competitive swimmer for North Carolina State University and a 1976 Montreal Olympic bronze medalist in the 200-meter backstroke. At the 1975 Pan American Games he won the 200 m backstroke event, but also contracted hepatitis and had to stop training for several months, managing to recover by the 1976 Olympics where he medaled in the event. He would later have a career as an architect.

Harrigan was born in South Bend, Indiana on October 29, 1955. He began competitive swimming by the age of ten, and swam for both the Michiana Marlins and South Bend Adams High School, where he attended from 1970 to 1974 and was coached by Steve Smith. Gaining recognition early in his swimming career, he set a national age group record in the 50-yard backstroke at the age of only 10. At the Michiana Marlins, a highly competitive AAU age group swim club in South Bend, he was coached by Tony and Karen Kowals, whom he strongly credited for improving his times and technique during his High School years. He was a two-time State Champion by his High School Junior year and trained four hours a day, with a one-hour morning session, and a three-hour session after school. In 1974, serving as his High School team co-captain, he set a national High School record of 4:42.2 in the 500-yard freestyle as a Senior at Adams High. His 1974 High School state records included a time of 1:42.9 in the 200-yard freestyle, and an improvement in the 500-yard freestyle to 4:35.158, setting both records at the Indiana State Meet in February, 1974. As a Junior, he held Indiana state titles in both the 100-yard backstroke and 200-yard freestyle events.

== Career ==
=== North Carolina State swimmer ===
Harrigan was an outstanding student who earned a 3.5 grade point average and majored in architecture at North Carolina State University (NCSU), where he swam for the NC State Wolfpack swimming and diving team in National Collegiate Athletic Association (NCAA) competition. At NCSU, where he graduated in 1979, receiving a scholarship, he swam for Hall of Fame Coach Don Easterling, who coached NCSU from 1971 to 1995. Easterling was a demanding coach who led NCSU's swimming team to twelve consecutive Atlantic Coast Conference (ACC) Titles from 1971 to 1982, which included ACC conference titles during Harrigan's tenure with the swimming team. In February 1978, Harrigan was voted the "Outstanding Performer" at the ACC Championship meet in Charlottesville, leading the team to another conference championship. He won the 100 and 200-yard backstroke, the 500-yard freestyle, and was the winning 400-yard medley relay and 800 freestyle relay teams.

After his time at North Carolina, Harrigan studied for a master's degree in Architecture at Pennsylvania State University, completing the degree in 1983, while spending time assisting with their swimming team.

=== 1976 Olympic bronze ===
In the summer after his Sophomore year in college in June, 1976, Harrigan had the third fastest 200 backstroke time of 2:02.96 at the U.S. Olympic Swimming trials in Long Beach, California, finishing third behind John Naber and Peter Rocca, as he would at the Olympics.

After travelling with a strong team to Montreal in 1976, despite setting an Olympic record time of 2:02.25 in the 200-meter backstroke behind gold medalist John Naber in the preliminary heat, he placed only third in the final heat, taking a bronze medal with a still impressive time of 2:01.35. His time was .8 seconds behind the American silver medalist Peter Rocca who touched just behind American John Naber, which gave the Americans all three Olympic medals. Naber became the first swimmer to go under 2 minutes for the 200-meter backstroke with a time of 1:59.19. The American Olympic swimming team won 25 of 33 medals, becoming the most successful American swim team in U.S. Olympic history.

=== Later life ===
Twenty years after his Olympic medal, Harrigan was a busy employee of the Spillman Farmer architectural firm in Bethlehem, Pennsylvania, where he had worked since 1983, after studying at Penn State. His architectural achievements included designing Bethlehem's Calypso School and the outside of Lehigh University's Goodman Stadium, used for their football games. He and his wife, the former Therese Rucker, another All American swimmer from North Carolina State, had three sons.

Continuing to swim during his professional life, he trained with United States Masters and competed in U.S. Masters backstroke competitions between 1985 and 1994 in the Delaware Valley area.

== Honors ==
In High School, Harrigan received the honor of "Athlete of the Year" by the American Athletic Union. He was made a member of the Indiana High School Swimming and Diving Hall of Fame, and was made a member of the North Carolina Swimming Hall of Fame in 1986. During his years at North Carolina State University, while swimming at the 1978 Atlantic Coast Championship, the coaches voted him the meet's outstanding performer. In his Senior year at North Carolina State, he was awarded NCAA's "Top Five Award", for both athletic and academic excellence. The award was presented to only five outstanding NCAA American collegiate athletes.

== See also ==
- List of North Carolina State University people
- List of Olympic medalists in swimming (men)
