= Angelo Ruiz =

Puerto Rican judoka

Personal information
- Nationality: Puerto Rican
- Born: 5 October 1957 (age 67)
- Height: 169 cm (5 ft 7 in)
- Weight: 63 kg (139 lb)

Sport
- Sport: Judo

Angelo Ruiz (born 5 October 1957) is a Puerto Rican judoka. He competed at the 1976 Summer Olympics and the 1988 Summer Olympics.
