= Helder Baiona de Jesús =

Portuguese middle-distance runner

Helder Baiona de Jesus
Personal information
- Nationality: Portuguese
- Born: 12 April 1954 (age 72) Lisbon
- Height: 178 cm (5 ft 10 in)
- Weight: 65 kg (143 lb)

Sport
- Country: Portugal
- Sport: Middle-distance running

Helder Baiona de Jesus is a Portuguese Olympic middle-distance runner. He represented his country in the men's 1500 meters at the 1976 Summer Olympics. His time was a 3:44.20 in the first heat, and a 3:47.37 in the semifinals.
