= Henrique Vicêncio =

Portuguese swimmer

Personal information
- Born: 8 February 1959 (age 67)

Sport
- Sport: Swimming

Henrique Vicêncio (born 8 February 1959) is a Portuguese former swimmer. He competed in three events at the 1976 Summer Olympics.
