= Chang Eun-kyung =

South Korean Olympic judoka (1951–1996)

Personal information
- Born: 26 May 1951
- Died: 12 May 1996 (aged 44)
- Occupation: Judoka

Korean name
- Hangul: 장은경
- Hanja: 張銀景
- RR: Jang Eungyeong
- MR: Chang Ŭn'gyŏng

Sport
- Country: South Korea
- Sport: Judo
- Weight class: ‍–‍63 kg

Achievements and titles
- Olympic Games: (silver) (1976)
- World Champ.: R16 (1975)
Medal record
Men's judo
Representing South Korea
Olympic Games
Silver medal – second place	1976 Montreal	‍–‍63 kg

Profile at external databases
- IJF: 54319
- JudoInside.com: 6074
- Updated on 21 June 2023

Chang Eun-kyung (Korean: 장은경; 26 May 1951 – 12 May 1996) was a Korean judoka and silver medalist in the 1976 Summer Olympics.
