= Marian Standowicz =

Polish judoka

Personal information
- Nationality: Polish
- Born: 3 December 1955 (age 69); Koszalin, Poland

Sport
- Sport: Judo

Marian Standowicz (born 3 December 1955) is a Polish judoka. He competed in the men's lightweight event at the 1976 Summer Olympics.
