= Ivan Vidmajer =

Slovene judoka

Personal information
- Nationality: Slovenian
- Born: 24 December 1949 (age 75); Slovenska Bistrica, Yugoslavia

Sport
- Sport: Judo

Ivan Vidmajer (born 24 December 1949) is a Slovenian judoka. He competed in the men's lightweight event at the 1976 Summer Olympics, representing Yugoslavia.
