= José Gomes (judoka) =

Portuguese judoka

Personal information
- Nationality: Portuguese
- Born: 14 July 1954 (age 70)

Sport
- Sport: Judo

José Gomes (born 14 July 1954) is a Portuguese judoka. He competed in the men's lightweight event at the 1976 Summer Olympics.
