= Community School Corporation of Southern Hancock County =

School district in Indiana, United States

Community School Corporation of Southern Hancock County is a school district headquartered in New Palestine, Indiana.

== Schools ==
Secondary:

- New Palestine High School
- New Palestine Junior High School

Primary:

- New Palestine Intermediate School
- Brandywine Elementary School
- New Palestine Elementary School
- Sugar Creek Elementary School

Preschool:

- Little Dragons Preschool
