= Erich Pointner =

Austrian judoka

Personal information
- Nationality: Austria
- Born: 19 August 1950 (age 74); Sandl, Austria
- Occupation: Judoka

Sport
- Sport: Judo

Profile at external databases
- IJF: 54323
- JudoInside.com: 8728

Erich Pointner (born 19 August 1950) is an Austrian judoka. He competed at the 1972 Summer Olympics and the 1976 Summer Olympics.
