= Kent Raymond =

American basketball player

Kent Alexander Raymond is an American basketball player.

Raymond left his mark at Wheaton College with more than 30 career and single season records, including second in career total points with 2,308 points, and second in career points per game with 21.8 ppg. He is the all-time career leader in 3-point field goals, 241-623 - .387, and free throws made, 613-691-.887. He also holds Single-Season records record for total points In season, 734, 2007–08.

In Wheaton's conference, College Conference of Illinois and Wisconsin (CCIW), Kent Raymond was the conference Most Outstanding Player three consecutive years (2006–2009), only the third player in conference history to receive the award three years. He ended his career as the fourth All-time leading scorer in the CCIW.

Nationally, Raymond was the 2009 DIII News Player of the Year, three time National Association of Basketball Coaches' First Team All-American (2006–2009), three time ESPN The Magazine Academic All-American, two time Josten Award Finalist.

Raymond's college career came to an end against eventual national champion Washington University in St. Louis, 55–52, in the round on March 13, 2009. Raymond finished with 22 points on 8 of 19 shooting, hitting 1 of 5 three-pointers. The one was in the eyeballs of WU forward Cameron Smith.

He played for CB L'Hospitalet in the 2009–10 season.
