= New Palestine, Indiana =

- Town
- Town of New Palestine
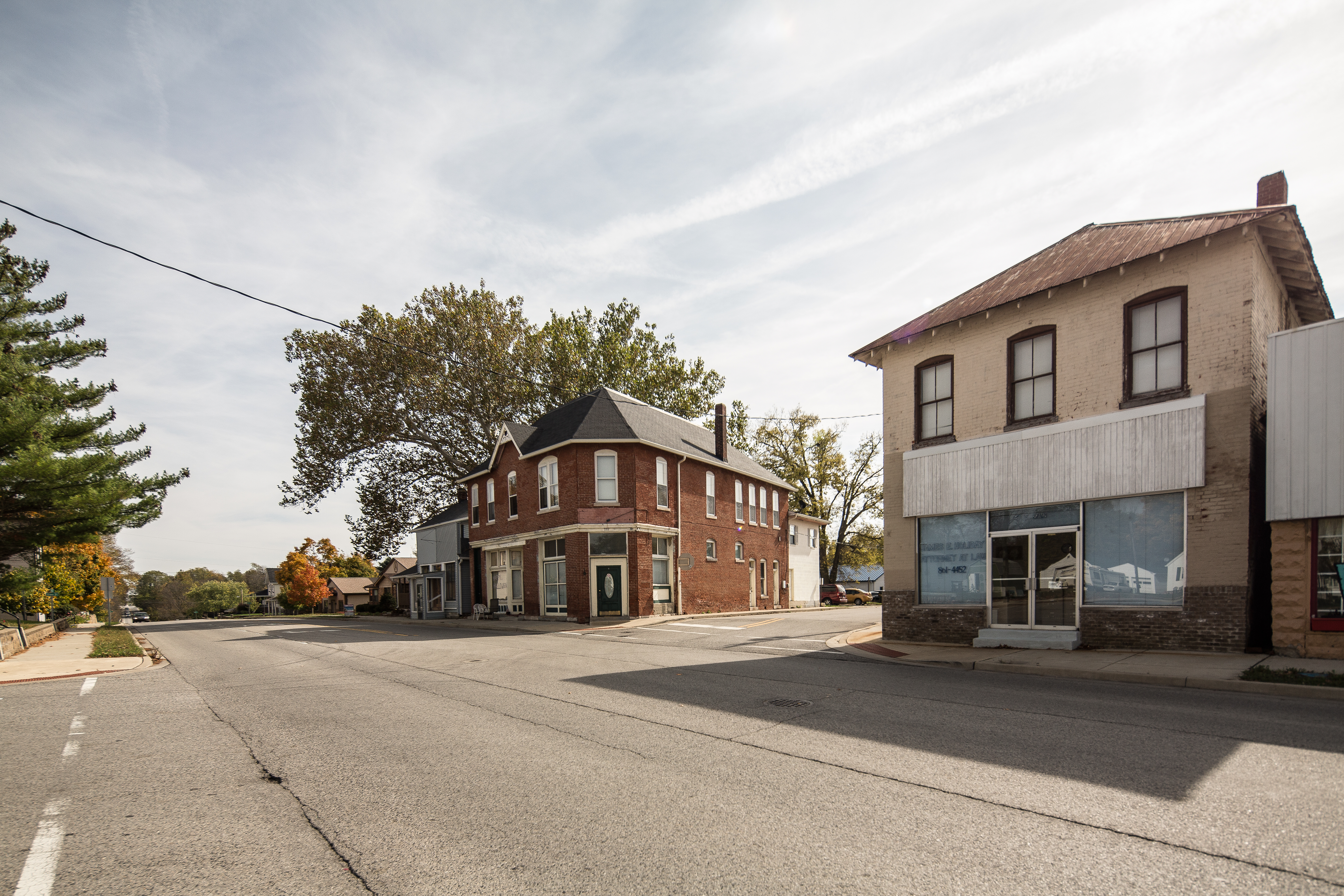
- New Palestine in 2016

- Logo
- Nickname: New Pal
- Location of New Palestine in Hancock County, Indiana.
- Coordinates: 39°44′21″N 85°53′38″W
- Country: United States
- State: Indiana
- County: Hancock
- Township: Sugar Creek

Area
  - Total: 1.99 sq mi (5.15 km^{2})
  - Land: 1.98 sq mi (5.13 km^{2})
  - Water: 0.0077 sq mi (0.02 km^{2})
- Elevation: 824 ft (251 m)

Population (2020)
  - Total: 2,744
  - Density: 1,385.5/sq mi (534.96/km^{2})
- Time zone: UTC-5 (EST)
  - Summer (DST): UTC-4 (EDT)
- ZIP code: 46163
- Area code: 317
- FIPS code: 18-53352
- GNIS feature ID: 2396805
- Website: newpalestine.in.gov

New Palestine (pronounced PAL-es-teen) is a town in Sugar Creek Township, Hancock County, Indiana, along Sugar Creek. As of the 2020 census, New Palestine had a population of 2,744.

== History ==
New Palestine was laid out October 1, 1838, by Jonathan Evans. It first consisted of fifteen blocks and thirty six lots. A petition for the incorporation of New Palestine as a town was dated May 22, 1871, and presented to the board of county commissioners at the June session of 1871. At the time of the petition, New Palestine had a population of around 669 people. The vote for incorporation was held on June 24, 1871. Many years after incorporation, the town had difficulty with its name. The post office was known as Sugar Creek, the railroad and express stations as Palestine and the name of the town itself was New Palestine. Through the efforts of E.F. Faut and Congressman William D. Bynum, the name of the post office was changed from Sugar Creek to New Palestine on January 16, 1889, and the name of the railroad station and express office were also changed to New Palestine. New Palestine High School has been involved in some rumors that stem from Ku Klux Klan (KKK) presence in Indiana in late 1910s to early 1920s. The rumors include New Palestine High School having been funded by a KKK member, in return, the high school mascot would be a dragon. Most of the rumors are pure speculation, with only a small bit of evidence supporting these claims. It is reported that a Klansman lived where the current New Palestine High School football field sits before the school was built.

== Geography ==
According to the 2010 census, New Palestine has a total area of 1.09 square miles (2.82 km^{2}), all land.

== Demographics ==
Historical population
Census	Pop.	Note	%±
1880	391		—
1890	404		3.3%
1900	444		9.9%
1910	450		1.4%
1920	442		−1.8%
1930	450		1.8%
1940	448		−0.4%
1950	504		12.5%
1960	725		43.8%
1970	863		19.0%
1980	749		−13.2%
1990	671		−10.4%
2000	1,264		88.4%
2010	2,055		62.6%
2020	2,744		33.5%
U.S. Decennial Census

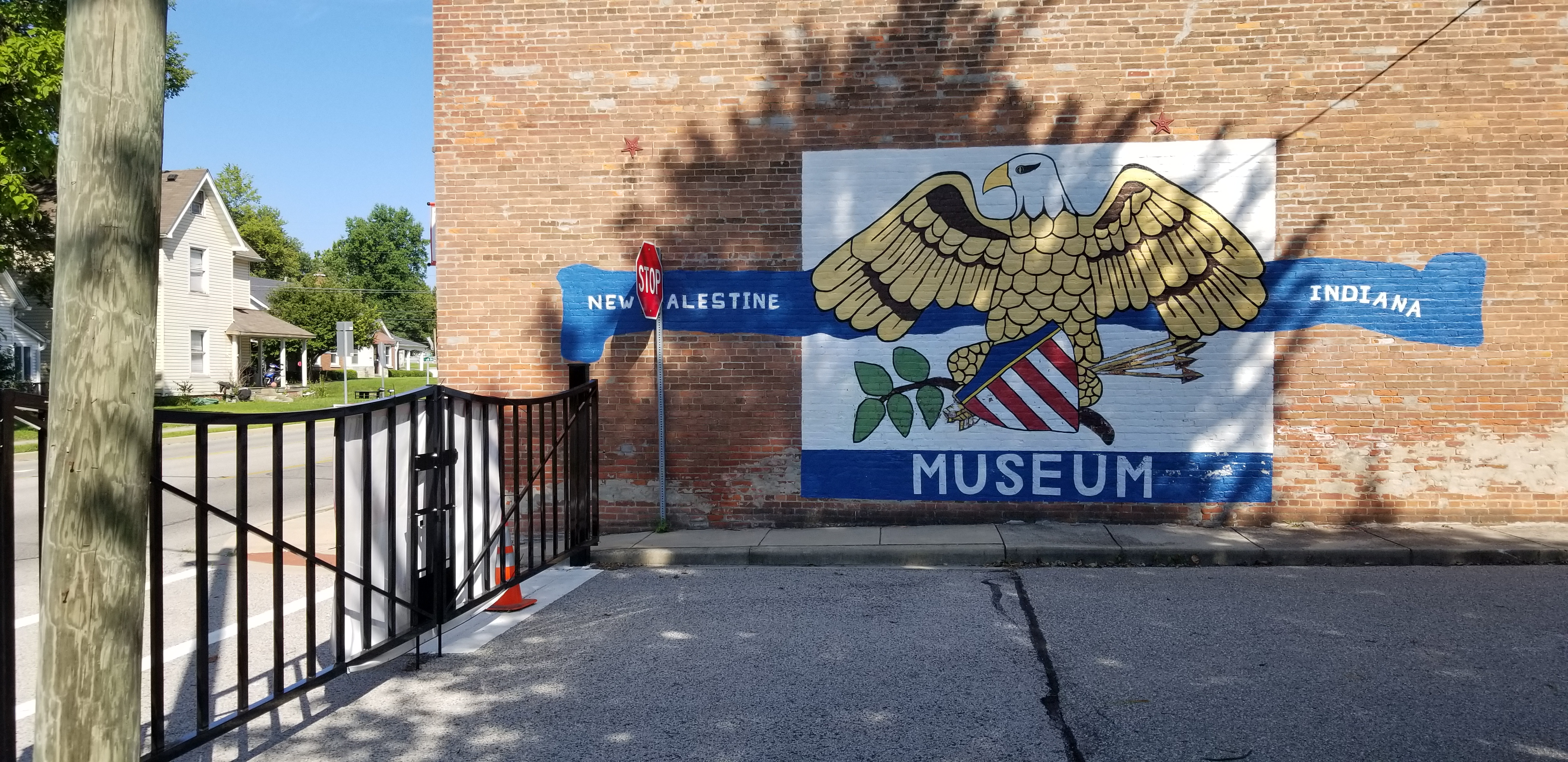
Mural on the side of the New Palestine Museum

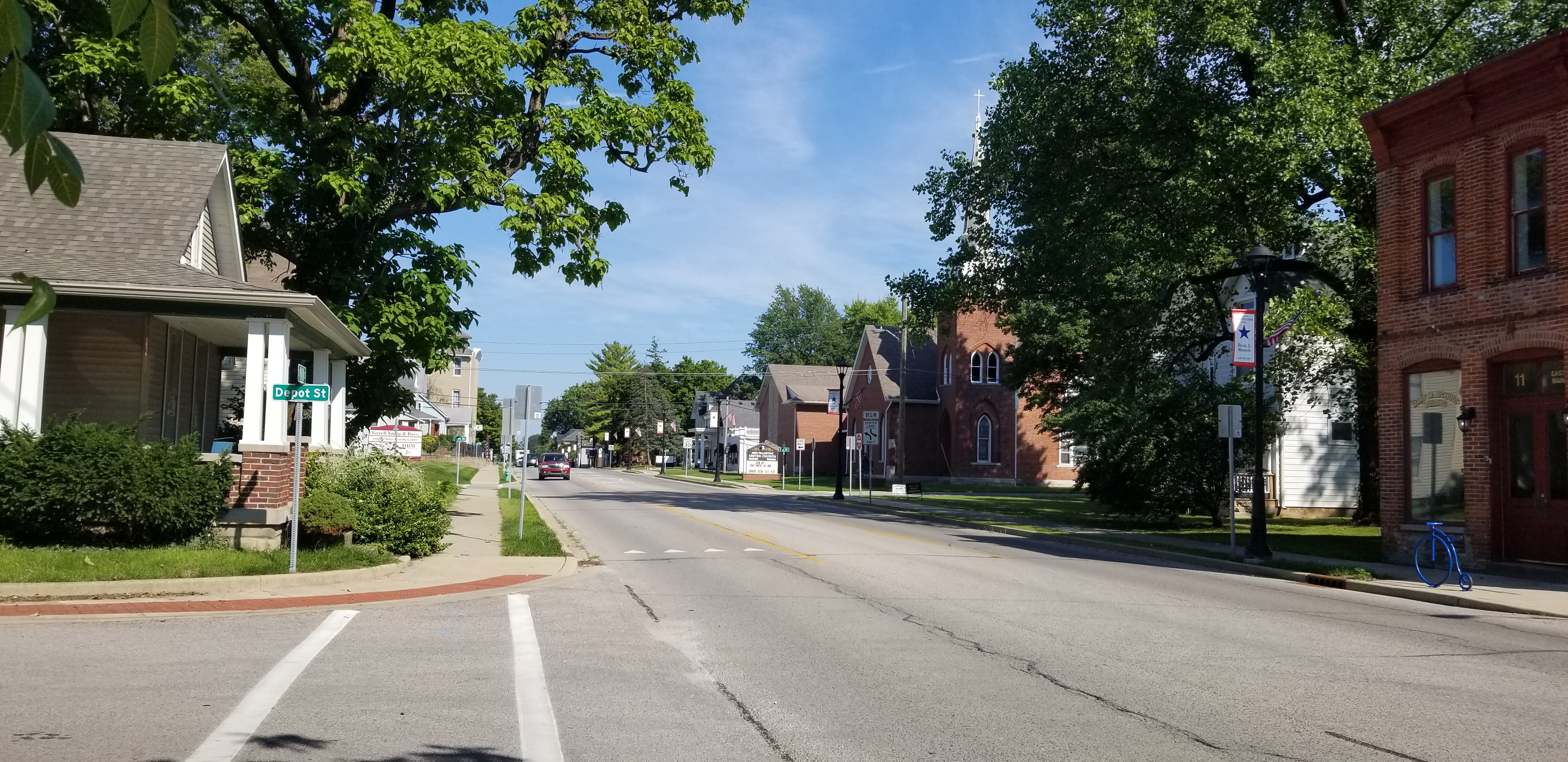
Intersection of Main Street and Depot

=== 2020 census ===
As of the 2020 census, New Palestine had a population of 2,744. The median age was 44.5 years. 22.8% of residents were under the age of 18 and 21.8% of residents were 65 years of age or older. For every 100 females there were 89.2 males, and for every 100 females age 18 and over there were 85.2 males age 18 and over.

99.1% of residents lived in urban areas, while 0.9% lived in rural areas.

There were 1,085 households in New Palestine, of which 31.9% had children under the age of 18 living in them. Of all households, 55.5% were married-couple households, 13.6% were households with a male householder and no spouse or partner present, and 26.7% were households with a female householder and no spouse or partner present. About 27.4% of all households were made up of individuals and 16.4% had someone living alone who was 65 years of age or older.

There were 1,148 housing units, of which 5.5% were vacant. The homeowner vacancy rate was 1.6% and the rental vacancy rate was 7.5%.

Racial composition as of the 2020 census
Race	Number	Percent
White	2,569	93.6%
Black or African American	15	0.5%
American Indian and Alaska Native	9	0.3%
Asian	16	0.6%
Native Hawaiian and Other Pacific Islander	0	0.0%
Some other race	2	0.1%
Two or more races	133	4.8%
Hispanic or Latino (of any race)	42	1.5%

=== 2010 census ===
As of the census of 2010, there were 2,055 people, 779 households, and 587 families living in the town. The population density was 1,885.3 inhabitants per square mile (727.9/km^{2}). There were 825 housing units at an average density of 756.9 per square mile (292.2/km^{2}). The racial makeup of the town was 97.8% White, 0.2% Native American, 0.6% Asian, 0.1% from other races, and 1.2% from two or more races. Hispanic or Latino of any race were 1.0% of the population.

There were 779 households, of which 41.7% had children under the age of 18 living with them, 59.2% were married couples living together, 11.9% had a female householder with no husband present, 4.2% had a male householder with no wife present, and 24.6% were non-families. 20.4% of all households were made up of individuals, and 8.7% had someone living alone who was 65 years of age or older. The average household size was 2.64 and the average family size was 3.04.

The median age in the town was 37.2 years. 28.9% of residents were under the age of 18; 6.9% were between the ages of 18 and 24; 26.2% were from 25 to 44; 25.4% were from 45 to 64; and 12.5% were 65 years of age or older. The gender makeup of the town was 49.8% male and 50.2% female.

=== 2000 census ===
As of the 2000 census, there were 1,264 people, 469 households, and 364 families living in the town. The population density was 1,685.7 inhabitants per square mile (650.9/km^{2}). There were 500 housing units at an average density of 666.8 per square mile (257.5/km^{2}). The racial makeup of the town was 98.66% White, 0.08% African American, 0.24% Native American, 0.16% Asian, 0.16% from other races, and 0.71% from two or more races. Hispanic or Latino of any race were 0.32% of the population.

There were 469 households, out of which 42.6% had children under the age of 18 living with them, 67.0% were married couples living together, 7.7% had a female householder with no husband present, and 22.2% were non-families. 20.7% of all households were made up of individuals, and 7.7% had someone living alone who was 65 years of age or older. The average household size was 2.70 and the average family size was 3.10.

In the town, the population was spread out, with 30.5% under the age of 18, 4.4% from 18 to 24, 35.4% from 25 to 44, 18.7% from 45 to 64, and 11.1% who were 65 years of age or older. The median age was 36 years. For every 100 females, there were 96.9 males. For every 100 females age 18 and over, there were 93.0 males.

The median income for a household in the town was $61,875, and the median income for a family was $71,667. Males had a median income of $50,156 versus $31,538 for females. The per capita income for the town was $27,821. About 1.7% of families and 2.6% of the population were below the poverty line, including 1.0% of those under age 18 and 9.3% of those age 65 or over.

== Arts and culture ==
New Palestine has a public library, a branch of the Hancock County Public Library.

== Education ==
New Palestine is home to the New Palestine Community Schools, which includes three elementary schools (New Palestine, Sugar Creek, and Brandywine), one junior high school (New Palestine Junior High), and one high school (also referred to as New Palestine High School).

The area includes Brandywine and Sugar Creek townships and is approximately 60 square miles (160 km^{2}) in area. There are currently 3,206 students enrolled in the entire district. It is adjacent to Warren and Franklin township to its west and Shelby County to its south.

New Palestine High School is arguably the central hub of the town. Countless events occur year-round in the area, the most attended including football and basketball games, the beginning of the annual New Palestine Parade, and the annual Fall festival at the Lion's Club.

== Notable people ==
- Angela Ahrendts, former CEO of Burberry and Senior Vice President, Retail, Apple Inc.
- Matt Canada, former offensive coordinator for the Pittsburgh Steelers
- William Larrabee, U.S. representative from Indiana
- Todd Yoder, former American football tight end and Super Bowl XXXVII Champion
