= Osman Yanar =

Turkish judoka

Personal information
- Nationality: Turkish
- Born: 2 March 1953 (age 72)

Sport
- Sport: Judo

Osman Yanar (born 2 March 1953) is a Turkish judoka. He competed in the men's lightweight event at the 1976 Summer Olympics.
