= António de Melo =

Portuguese swimmer

Personal information
- Born: 30 January 1960 (age 66)

Sport
- Sport: Swimming

António de Melo (born 30 January 1960) is a Portuguese former freestyle, backstroke and medley swimmer. He competed in six events at the 1976 Summer Olympics.
