= Savannah River Plant =

U.S. Department of Energy reservation in South Carolina

- Aiken, Allendale and Barnwell in South Carolina; Near Augusta, Georgia in United States
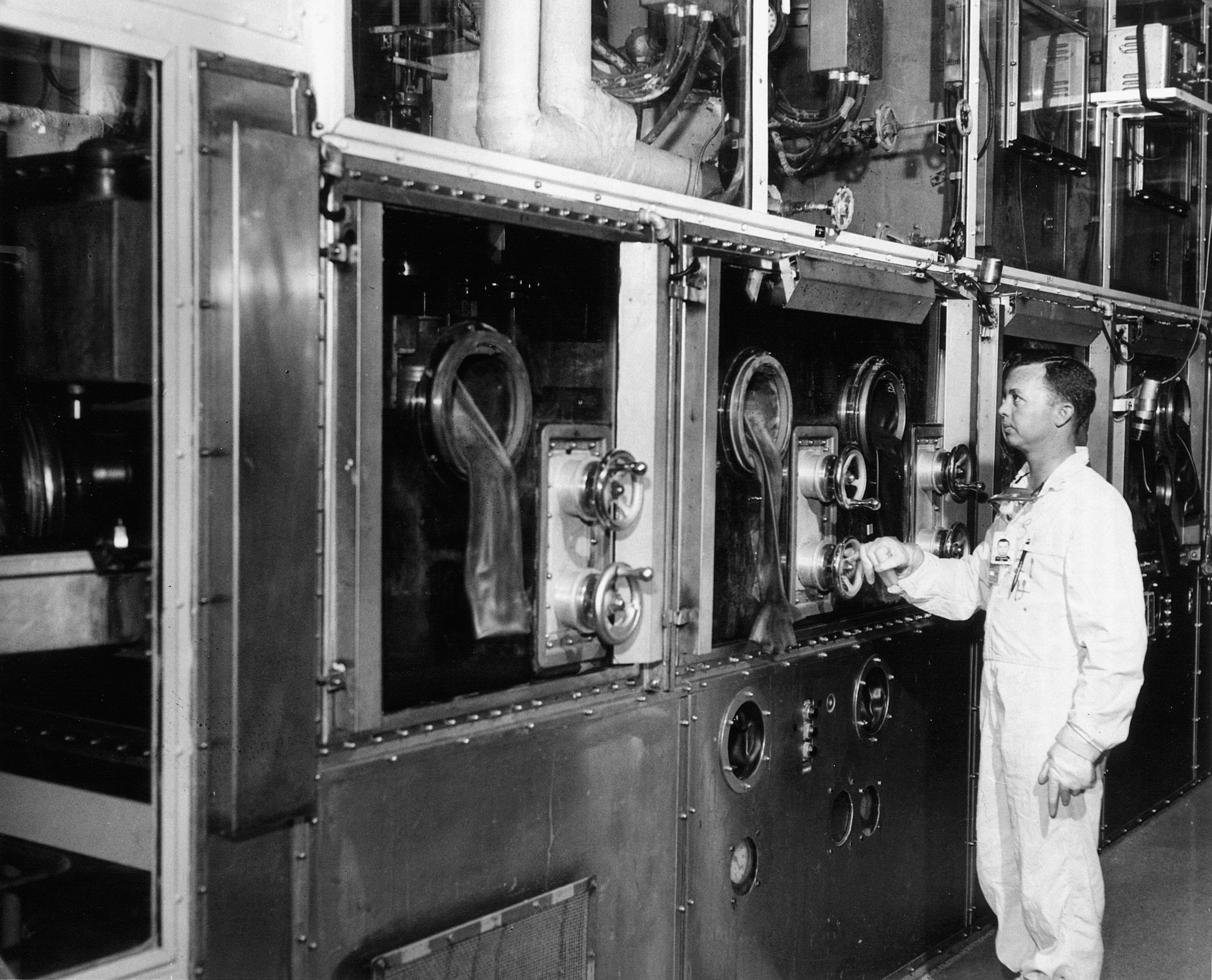
- Plutonium is produced for weapons purposes at the Atomic Energy Commission's Savannah River Plant by irradiating uranium in a nuclear reactor.

Site information
- Type: Nuclear materials production and processing facilities
- Owner: United States Department of Energy
- Operator: DuPont
- Open to the public: No
- Status: Renamed Savannah River Site in 1989

Location
- Map showing location of the site Savannah River Plant (the United States)
- Coordinates: 33°15′N 81°39′W
- Area: 310 sq mi (800 km^{2})

Site history
- Built: 1951
- In use: 1951–1989

Test information
- Remediation: 1981–present

The Savannah River Plant (SRP) facilities were built in the 1950s to produce materials used in the fabrication of nuclear weapons, primarily tritium and plutonium-239, by irradiating target materials with neutrons in nuclear reactors. Five heavy water reactors were built on the site. Other facilities at the plant included two chemical separation plants, a heavy water extraction plant, a nuclear fuel and target fabrication facility and waste management facilities. Production of nuclear materials for military use ceased in 1988.

DuPont was awarded the contract to manage and operate the plant. The site selected was on the Savannah River in Aiken and Barnwell Counties, South Carolina, about 20 miles (32 km) southeast of Augusta, Georgia. The choice was based on its being inland, with proximity to cooling water, highway and railroad access, electric power, and stable geology. The government eventually acquired 1,706 tracts totaling 200,742 acres (81,237 ha), including the entire small towns of Dunbarton and Ellenton. Until 1960, the SRP was protected by anti-aircraft guns.

In addition to producing plutonium and tritium for nuclear weapons, the SRP also produced transuranic elements for research and space exploration. In 1956, Clyde Cowan and Frederick Reines conducted an experiment at SRP that proved the existence of the neutrino, for which Reines was awarded the 1995 Nobel Prize in Physics. DuPont monitored the environmental impact of the SRP. This stewardship evolved into full-fledged research programs that monitored and continued to explore the impact of the site on the environmental health of the surrounding ecosystems, turning SRP into an early center of ecological activity in the United States.

== Establishment and construction ==
=== Background ===
On 1 January 1947, the Atomic Energy Commission (AEC) assumed responsibility for the research and production facilities the Army's Manhattan Project had created during World War II. The AEC's gaseous diffusion plants at Oak Ridge produced enriched uranium and its production reactors at the Hanford Site irradiated uranium to breed plutonium for nuclear weapons. In response to the detonation of the Soviet Union's first atomic bomb on 29 August 1949, the AEC embarked on an expansion program. On 31 January 1950, President Harry S. Truman directed the AEC to continue its work on all forms of atomic weapons, including the development of the hydrogen bomb.

An increase in plutonium production required more reactors. There were concerns about the vulnerability of the Hanford Site to Soviet bombers, but considerations of cost led to the idea of a second plutonium production site being rejected in 1947 and 1948. Now, the AEC faced a new challenge: producing large quantities of tritium, which was believed to be required by the hydrogen bomb. Tritium was produced by the irradiation of lithium-6. It has a half-life of 12.3 years, so about 5.6 percent decays in a given year, requiring a continuous replenishment process, whereas plutonium-239 has a half-life of 25,000 years, so the stockpile is only meaningfully reduced by weapons tests, accidents or use in warfare.

The Hanford reactors used nuclear graphite as a neutron moderator, even though heavy water offered superior neutron moderation properties. Heavy water also had the advantage of being both a moderator and a coolant. This made it a theoretically ideal choice for production reactors, but the scarcity of heavy water during World War II made its large-scale use impractical, leaving graphite as the only viable option, despite its limitations. At a meeting on 30 March 1950, Walter Zinn from the Argonne National Laboratory argued that reactors moderated and cooled with heavy water would be more suitable for tritium production, although they could produce plutonium as well. By using heavy water as a moderator, they could be fueled with natural rather than enriched uranium. The AEC's director of production, Walter J. Williams, suggested that what was required was a new production site, a new site office, and a new major contractor. For the contractor, the AEC Commissioners turned to DuPont.

DuPont had expertise in nuclear engineering operations, having designed and built the plutonium production complex at the Hanford Site and the X-10 graphite reactor at Oak Ridge National Laboratory. It had left Hanford at its own request in September 1946, turning it over to General Electric, but had continued to provide assistance to the AEC. Since 1948, the president of the company had been Crawford Greenewalt, who had been DuPont's man at Hanford during the war. The AEC formally requested that DuPont take the assignment on 12 June 1950. Greenewalt asked for a personal letter from Truman endorsing the urgency and importance of the project, which Truman provided on 25 July. The contract, which was signed on 30 September 1953, was a cost-plus-fixed-fee contract, with the fee set at one dollar.

=== Site selection ===
==== Search ====
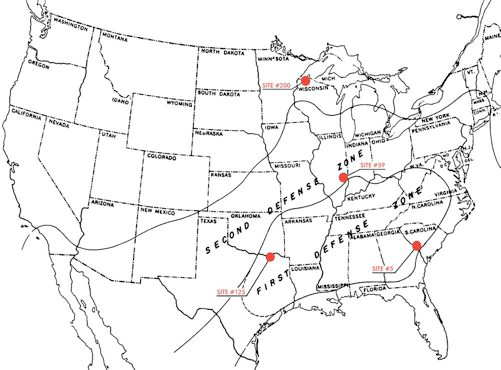
Defense zone location map

The contract with DuPont specified that it was in charge of all aspects of the project, including site selection. The AEC did have some input into the process. The AEC Military Liaison Committee obtained a map showing defense zones. The preferred defense zone was the First Defense Zone, which was beyond the range of Soviet bombers. It consisted mostly of the southeastern states, but excluded Florida and a 100-mile (160 km) strip along the coastline. The other factor which weighed heavily on the AEC was that while an isolated location with a low population density was preferred for safety and security reasons, the commissioners did not want it to be too isolated. The wartime construction of government towns at Richland, Oak Ridge and Los Alamos had left the AEC with communities it had to administer and was now eager to divest them. If yet another government town was indeed required, then DuPont would have to administer it.

DuPont employed a version of the criteria that it used for chemical plants. The United States Army Corps of Engineers was asked to identify government-owned reserves of 100,000 to 150,000 acres (40,000 to 61,000 ha) in the First Defense Zone in areas that were isolated but within 15 miles (24 km) or so of a town or towns with a population of 25,000 to 50,000. This yielded 105 potential sites. A key criterion was the availability of cooling water: the two reactors would each require about 100 cubic feet per second (2.8 m^{3}/s). This reduced the number of potential sites to 84, and applying further criteria brought it down to 17. Secondary criteria included highway and railroad access, at least 125,000 kW of electric power, and stable geology with a low probability of earthquakes.

With the outbreak of the Korean War in June 1950, the United States moved to a war economy, and the AEC sought to expand its production facilities. In September, the AEC increased the number of new reactors to be built to five, with the possibility of a sixth, power-generating, reactor. It calculated that 1,800 MW was required to create enough tritium for the hydrogen bomb program, and since each of the Savannah River Reactors was rated at 300 MW, six would be required. (Note: As early as 1952, the AEC realised that it had overbuilt. The sixth reactor was dropped from the budget in November 1952 and was never built.) This increased the cooling water requirement to 600 cubic feet per second (17 m^{3}/s), and cut the number of suitable sites to just five. Each of the six production reactors would need a separation plant, so this meant twelve facilities, each of which would occupy about 1 square mile (2.6 km^{2}). The separation plants had to be at least 1 mile (1.6 km) apart and the reactors at least 2 miles (3.2 km) from any other plant. For safety and security, the whole area had to be surrounded by a 5.5 miles (8.9 km) exclusion zone from which any inhabitants would have to be removed. This increased the desired size of the site to about 160,000 acres (65,000 ha).

==== Decision ====
In October, the preferred region criterion was relaxed in the hope of saving by using colder water. The search was expanded to the Second Defense Zone, covering much of the northeastern, central, and southwestern United States, to include areas with lower water temperatures and humidity. Site inspections reduced the final candidates down to four, two of which were in the First Defense Zone:

- Site Number 5 – on the Savannah River in Aiken and Barnwell Counties South Carolina, about 20 miles (32 km) southeast of Augusta, Georgia;
- Site Number 125 – on the Red River in Fannin and Lamar Counties in Texas and Bryan and Choctaw Counties in Oklahoma, about 76 miles (122 km) northeast of Dallas, Texas;
- Site Number 59 – on the Wabash River in Crawford and Clark Counties in Illinois and Sullivan County in Indiana, about 20 miles (32 km) southeast of Terre Haute, Indiana; and
- Site Number 205 – on the shores of Lake Superior in Bayfield and Douglas Counties in Wisconsin, about 26 miles (42 km) southeast of Duluth, Minnesota.

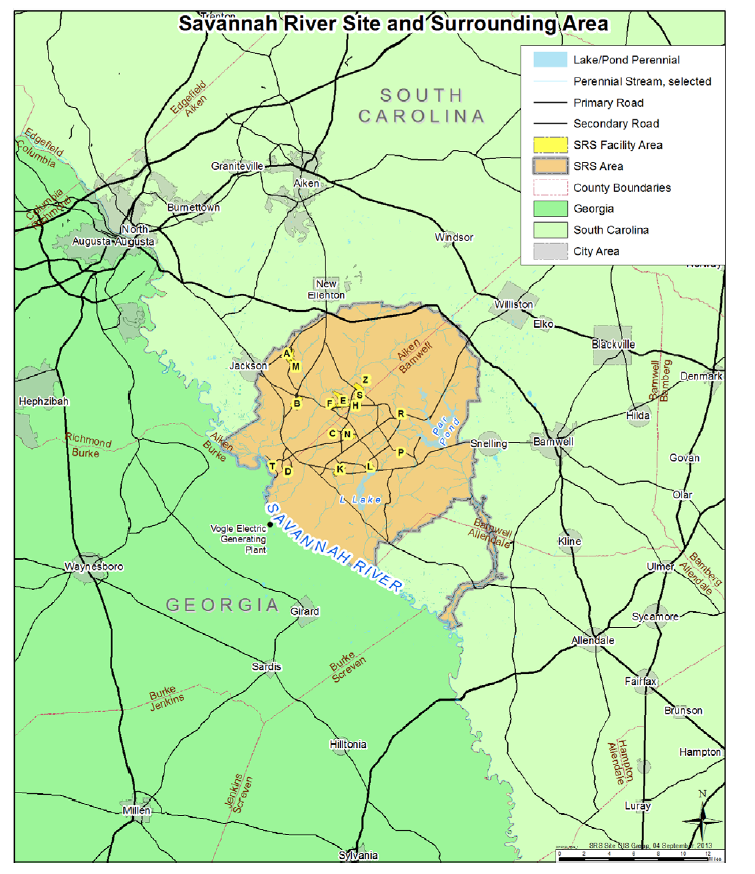
Savannah River Site and surrounding area

Site Number 5 emerged as DuPont's preferred location. The Savannah River had better water quality than the Red River, which would save on the cost of expensive water purification facilities. The Wabash had colder water, but Site Number 59 was in prime farm land, whereas Site Number 5 was in land considered marginal for agriculture. During site inspection, the survey team also visited, and was impressed by, the Clarks Hill Dam, which was then under construction. Site Number 205 had benefits, but these were not considered sufficient to select a site outside the preferred defense zone.

The AEC was informed of DuPont's choice on 10 November 1950, and the findings of the site survey were presented to the AEC Site Review Committee on 20 November. The Site Review Committee had been established by the AEC in August to review DuPont's findings, and was headed by Leif Sverdrup, who had been a Corps of Engineers officer in the Southwest Pacific Area during World War II.

Two days later, seven members of the DuPont site survey team met with the AEC commissioners in Washington, D.C. The commissioners learned that DuPont was recommending the acquisition of 240,000 acres (97,000 ha) instead of 160,000 acres (65,000 ha). The additional land provided river frontage as a natural boundary, secured access to the water supply, and provided flexibility in the location of pumping stations. The commissioners were unhappy that the proposed boundary involved the removal of the small towns of Dunbarton, Ellenton, Jackson and Snelling. Commissioners Henry D. Smyth and T. Keith Glennan inspected the site by air and car on 26 November, and later that day the commissioners approved the acquisition.

An announcement was issued on 28 November, in which the site was officially named the "Savannah River Plant" (SRP). Commissioner Sumner Pike was frank about the prospects of developing the hydrogen bomb, which he described as "somewhere between the possible and the probable". Doubts about the feasibility of the hydrogen bomb persisted until the Operation Greenhouse nuclear tests in April and May 1951.

=== Land acquisition ===
Haggling over the SRP boundaries continued into December. By moving the manufacturing area slightly, the towns of Jackson and Snelling were saved, but Dunbarton and Ellenton remained within the boundary. The Supplemental Appropriation Act of 1950 (Public Law 81-843 [H. R. 9526]), approved on September 27, 1950, increased the AEC budget by $250,000,000 (equivalent to $3×10^{9} in 2025) to acquire land for a plant to manufacture radioactive products. Responsibility for land acquisition was delegated to the South Atlantic Division of the Corps of Engineers.

On 28 December, the Corps of Engineers was told to proceed with the land acquisition, although the precise boundaries of the site were not finalized until 11 January 1951. The surveyors commenced compiling an accurate map of the site and its ownership. A team of 13 appraisers was assembled, all with appraisal experience in South Carolina. The appraisers valued the property, and if the owner accepted the valuation, then a contract was signed. If not, then the property was condemned in the federal district court. The money was deposited with the court, and the owner could ask for up to 80 to 90 percent as credit against the final award. Property that was required immediately was obtained under a federal declaration of taking.

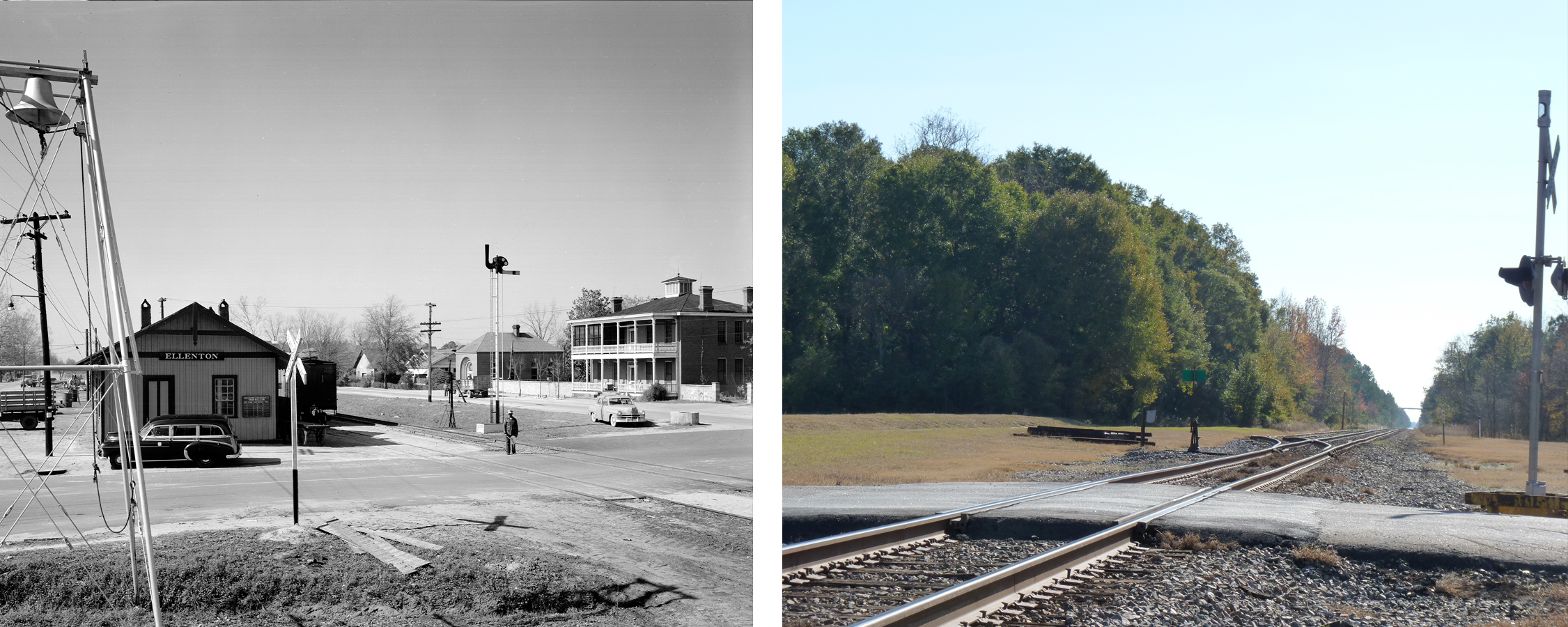
Ellenton in 1950 (left) and 2010 (right)

A major case heard in May 1951 involved the Leigh Banana Crate Company, which valued its factory at $3 million (equivalent to $37 million in 2025), while the Corps of Engineers thought it was worth half that. The government eventually had to pay out $1,280,965 (equivalent to $15,888,893 in 2025). Of the 1,706 tracts acquired, totaling 200,742 acres (81,237 ha), 73 percent were occupied by farmers, the majority of whom were African-American. Many were sharecroppers, although sharecropping was in decline in the region. Sharecroppers and tenants were paid for the value of crops that were already planted.

The towns of Ellenton (population 746 in 1950) and Dunbarton (population about 300) were acquired, the residents were forced to relocate, and 126 cemeteries were removed. About 120 black and 30 white families moved from Ellenton to the new development of New Ellenton. While black and white neighborhoods were intermingled in the old town, the new was built with strict racial segregation, black and white communities being divided by the highway.

Eventually, 46 percent of the land was acquired through condemnation. Strom Thurmond, a former governor of South Carolina who had run against Truman in 1948, was a partner in the Aiken law firm of Thurmond, Lybrand and Simons. The firm represented many of the landholders in court, pocketing more than a third of the settlement in legal fees. Of the 646 condemnation lawsuits, 251 went to trial and 445 were settled out of court. The last of the land suits was settled on 1 April 1958.

The total cost of the property acquired was $15,582,026 (equivalent to $193,277,053 in 2025). In addition, the state of South Carolina was reimbursed $471,621 (equivalent to $5,849,914 in 2025) for the cost of relocating highways and $270,673 (equivalent to $3,357,386 in 2025) was spent relocating utilities. Also, 126 cemeteries with 5,894 graves, some dating back to the 18th century, were relocated at a cost of $168,749 (equivalent to $2,093,137 in 2025). As estimated in 1959, the total value of land acquisition came to about $19 million (equivalent to about $236 million in 2025). The site eventually encompassed 310 square miles (800 km^{2}).

=== Construction ===
==== Reactors ====
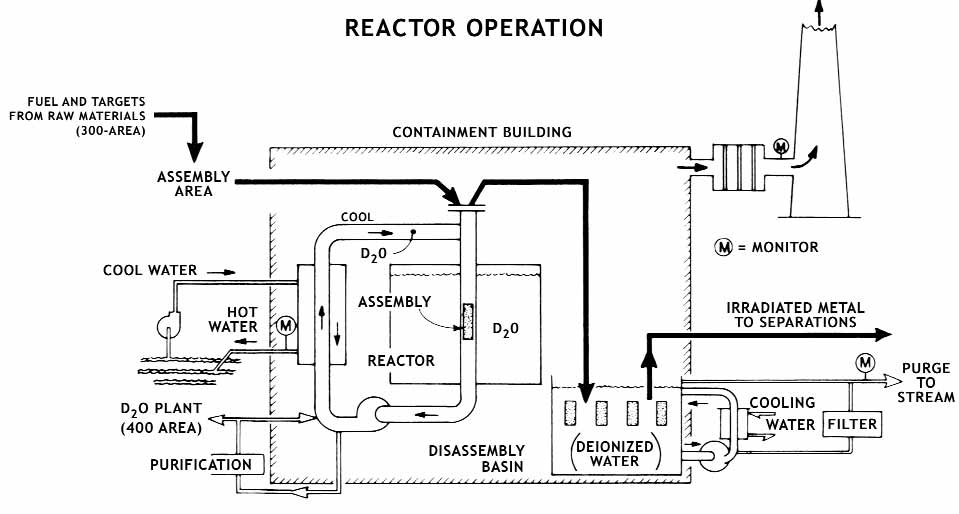
Reactor design

Hanford, the Argonne National Laboratory, the Oak Ridge National Laboratory and the Knolls Atomic Power Laboratory all had significant input into the design of the Savannah River Plant and the training of its designers and operators. Physicists Eugene Wigner and John Wheeler were consulted. At Argonne, scientists researched the effects of irradiation on various alloys. The decision to clad the Savannah River Plant fuel elements in aluminium arose from these tests.

The AEC initially wanted DuPont to build two heavy-water-cooled-and-moderated nuclear reactors using natural uranium as fuel to produce plutonium and tritium for nuclear weapons. DuPont adopted a flexible design approach, in which critical design issues were postponed as long as possible in the hope that the best possible design would be determined through research or consultation. Decisions were taken where necessary, in awareness that they might narrow future choices. Partly this arose out of necessity, as the requirement for tritium, and therefore the balance between plutonium and tritium production, remained uncertain. At a conference in Princeton, New Jersey, in 1951, it was suggested that lithium could be placed in the weapon and the neutrons produced by nuclear fission used to generate tritium in situ.

P Reactor under construction

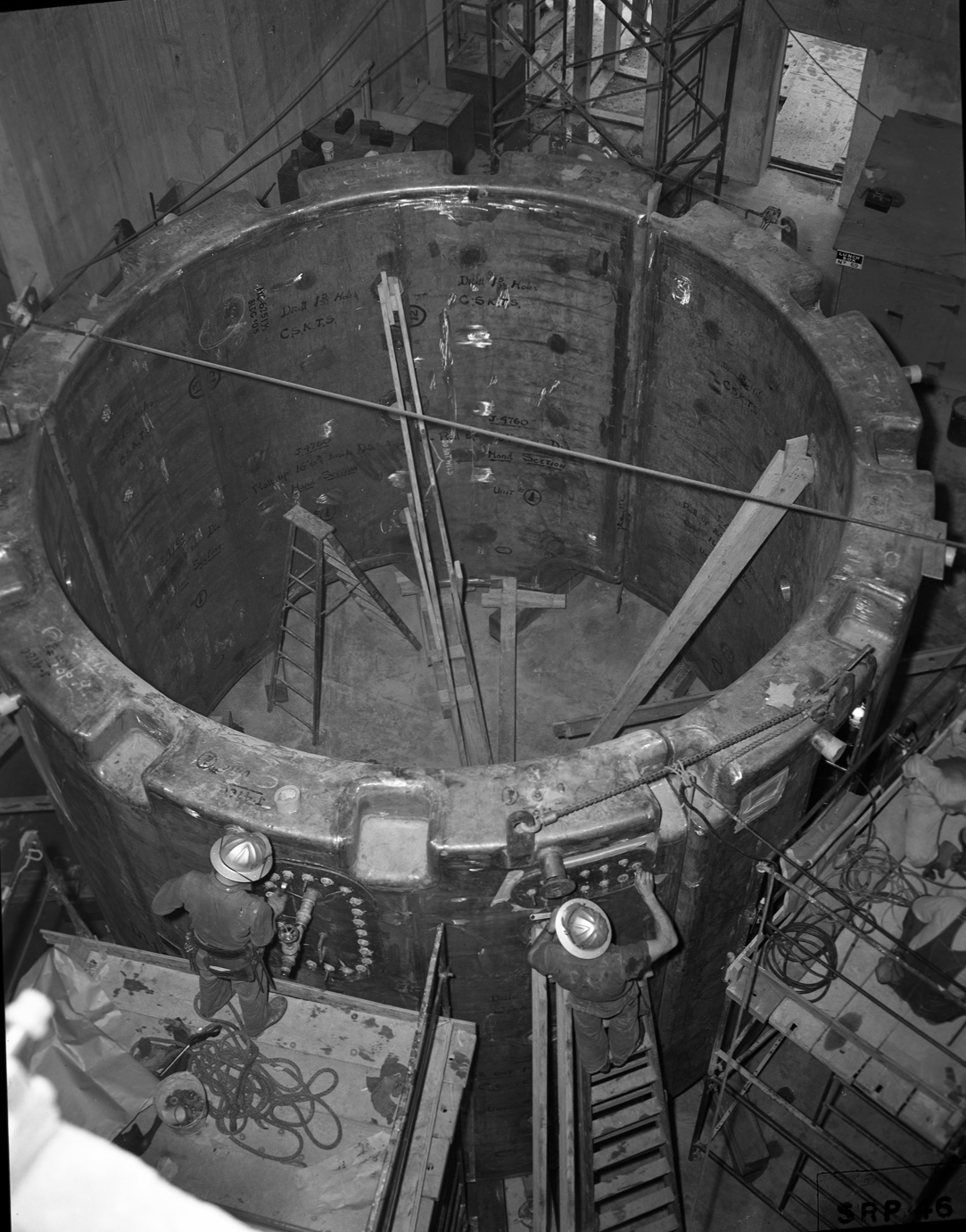
Reactor vessel

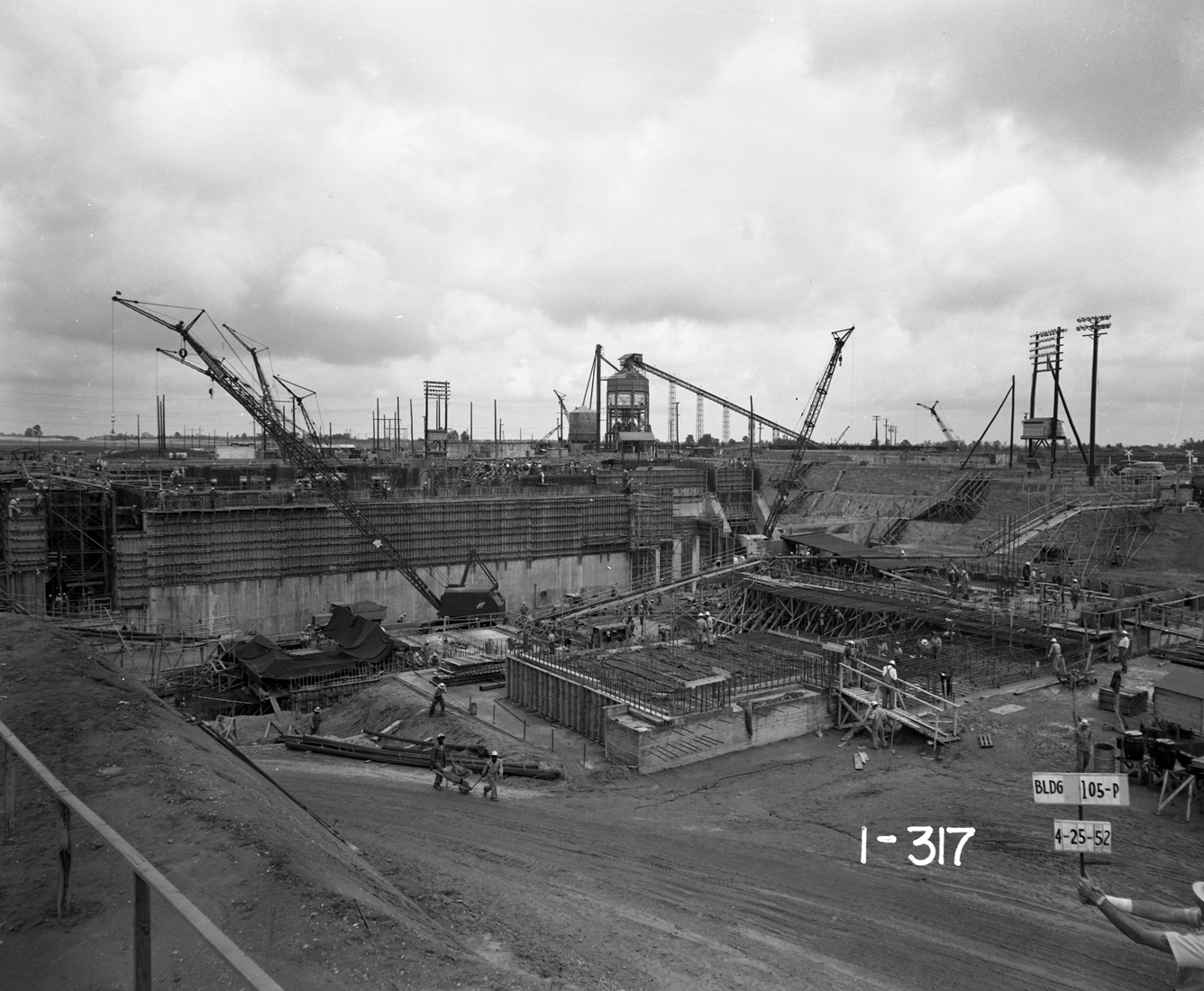
On 25 April 1952

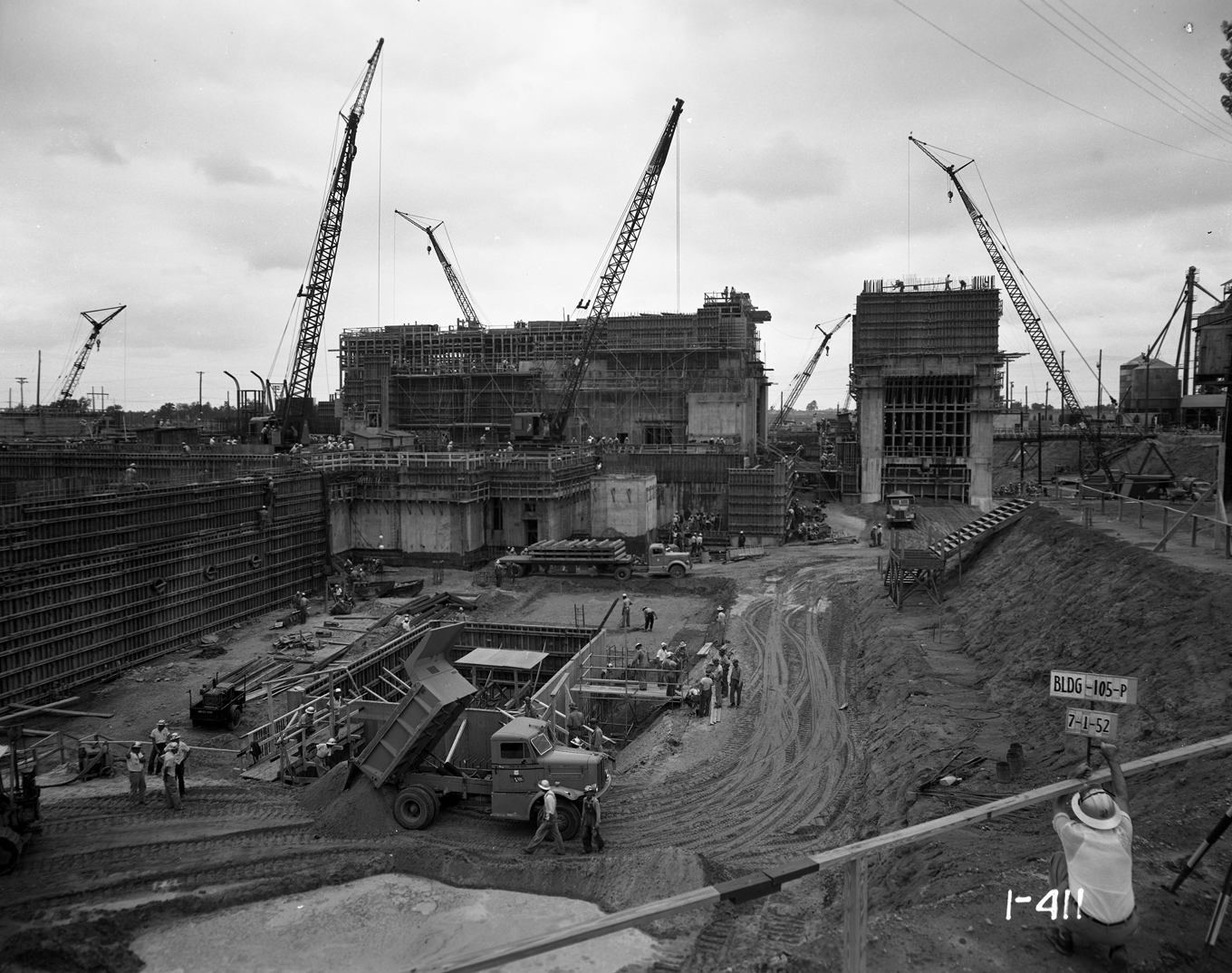
On 1 July 1952

The design of the SRP production reactors was based primarily on the Zero Power Reactor II, a small heavy water reactor commonly referred to as "ZPR-II", at Argonne National Laboratory. The AEC and DuPont finally accepted Argonne's conceptual production reactor design "CP-6" at the end of 1950. An early design decision was to use cylindrical canned slugs for fuel. Although plates might have been easier to cool due to their larger surface area, and therefore allow the reactors to operate at greater power levels, all the experience at Hanford was with slugs. Once slugs were chosen, future choices became restricted by the tubes in the original design, and more complex shapes could not be explored. This did not prove to be a problem, as even before startup, R Reactor was found to be capable of 700 MW, and upgrades in later years permitted the reactors to be run at up to 2,000 MW. On the other hand, it was found that raw river water was more effective as a coolant in the heat exchangers than treated river water, so the four expensive water treatment plants were omitted. Tests also revealed that heavy water was less corrosive than the Columbia River water used as a coolant at Hanford. The first nuclear reactor to operate was the 305-M graphite test pile. The low-power (30 W) test reactor went critical in September 1952 and operated until 1981. It was primarily used to measure the reactivity of fuel metals and other reactor component materials. Several other test reactors were later built in the Physics Assembly Laboratory, like the Process Development Pile that was instrumental in optimizing the chemical and physical parameters for plutonium and tritium production.

Construction of the first production reactor at the Savannah River Plant, R Reactor, commenced in June 1951, and was completed in July 1953, twenty-five months later. R Reactor became operational in December 1953. Although slow by Hanford standards (the SRP reactors required a longer period of testing and tweaking before becoming fully operational than Hanford's graphite reactors), this was much faster than later generations of nuclear engineers were able to achieve. P, L, and K Reactors followed in February, July and October 1954, respectively, and the first irradiated fuel was discharged, from R Reactor, in March 1955. C Reactor went critical in February 1955.

Reactor construction and completion
Reactor name	Date approved	Date commenced	Date completed	Date operational	Date shut down
R Reactor	May 1950	June 1951	July 1953	December 1953	June 1964
P Reactor	May 1950	July 1951	October 1953	February 1954	August 1988
L Reactor	October 1950	October 1951	February 1954	July 1954	June 1988
K Reactor	October 1950	October 1951	July 1954	October 1954	April 1988
C Reactor	October 1950	February 1952	February 1955	March 1955	June 1985

==== Chemical separation facilities ====
Two chemical separation facilities were built, 200-F and 200-H. The former was fully built, the latter initially partly built but expandable. They were located in the center of the site, 2.5 miles (4.0 km) from the nearest reactor area and 6 miles (9.7 km) from the site perimeter. Construction involved the erection of 50 major buildings, the grading of 300 acres (120 ha) of ground, the movement of 2,500,000 cubic yards (1,900,000 m^{3}) of earth, and the pouring of 300,000 cubic yards (230,000 m^{3}) of concrete. The centerpieces were the canyon buildings, monumental reinforced concrete structures four stories high and divided into 16 sections where the separation of highly radioactive substances took place.

H Canyon under construction (left) and as finished (center and right)

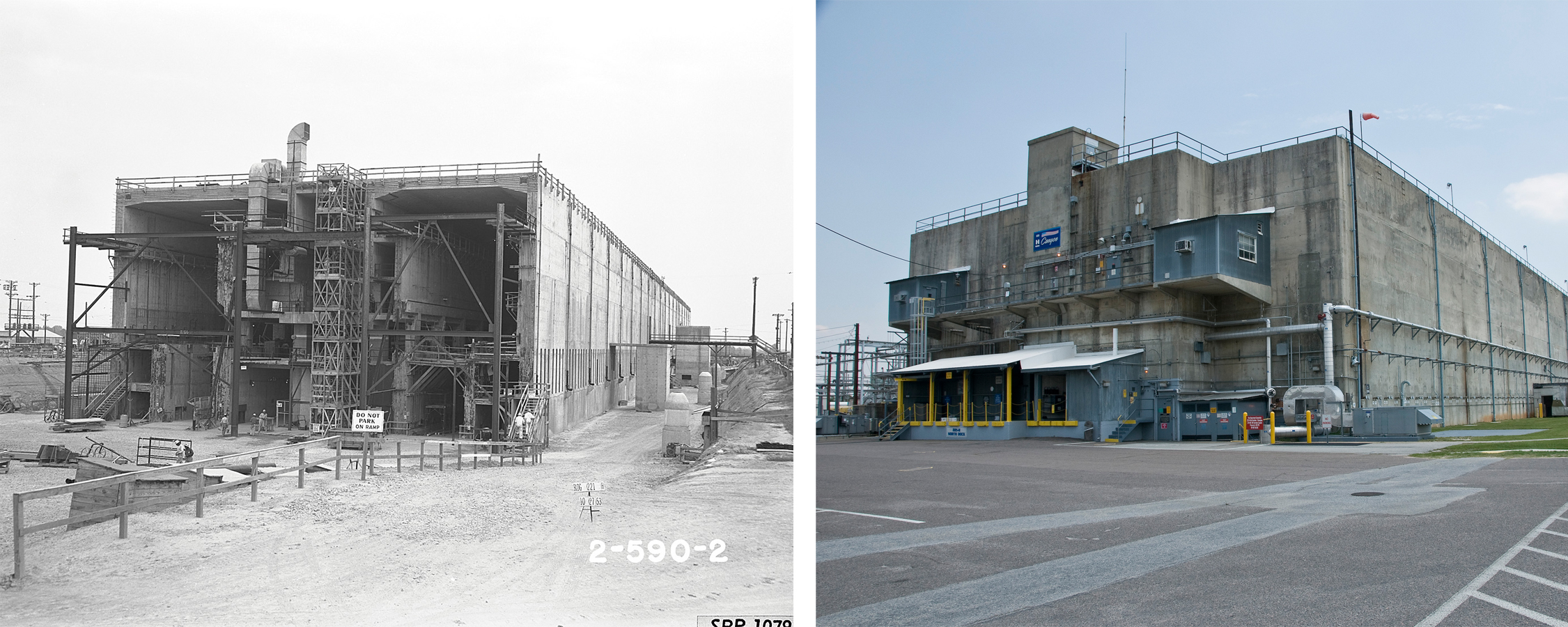

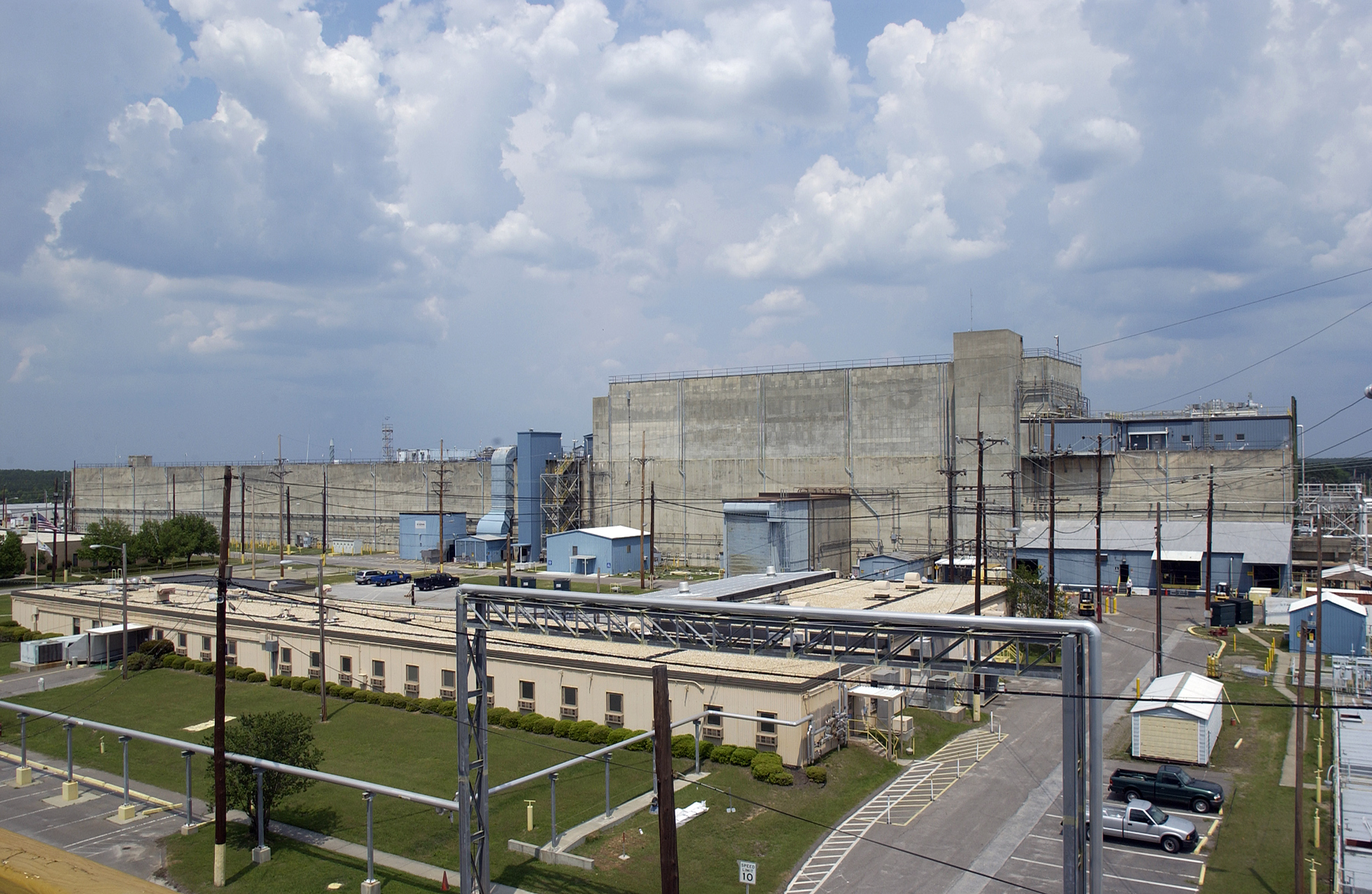

==== Workforce ====
Construction required large numbers of skilled workers such as carpenters, painters, electricians, plumbers, concreters, pipe fitters and truck drivers. Within six months of the project's commencement, DuPont was hiring more than one hundred workers per day. There were national labor shortages due to the call up of draftees and reservists for the Korean War. The Davis–Bacon Act of 1931 mandated that workers on federal construction projects be paid the local prevailing wage at a minimum, but DuPont consistently paid over and above that. It could not satisfy its requirements locally, and therefore had to offer higher wages to lure workers from other parts of the country, although most came from the southeastern states.

DuPont recruited most of its workers through building trade unions associated with the American Federation of Labor (AFL). Congressman Don Wheeler alleged that DuPont was operating a closed shop in violation of the Taft–Hartley Act. There were exceptions, such as the twenty to thirty displaced residents of Ellenton that were hired, and Granville M. Read, DuPont's chief engineer denied that there was an agreement with the unions to keep the bumber of non-union workers down to the minimum needed to meet the requirements of the act. Truman's 1948 Executive Order 9980 abolished segregation in the federal establishment, of which AEC was a part, but DuPont had only one black white-collar worker, and the AEC had no black employees at any level at all. Most AFL unions excluded black members, and many of those that did not kept them in segregated local branches. About 90 percent of the black people employed at the construction site were common laborers.

=== Construction costs ===
By 1 January 1956, the construction of the basic plant was complete, at a cost of $1,065,500,500 (equivalent to $1.2617769079×10^{10} in 2025). The work had involved 80 million board feet (190,000 m^{3}) of lumber, 126,000 carloads of materials, 118,000 short tons (107,000 t) of reinforcing steel, 1.5 million cubic yards (1.1 million cubic meters) of concrete, 26,000 short tons (24,000 t) of structural steel, 85 miles (137 km) of underground water pipes, and 82 miles (132 km) of railroad tracks.

=== Defenses ===
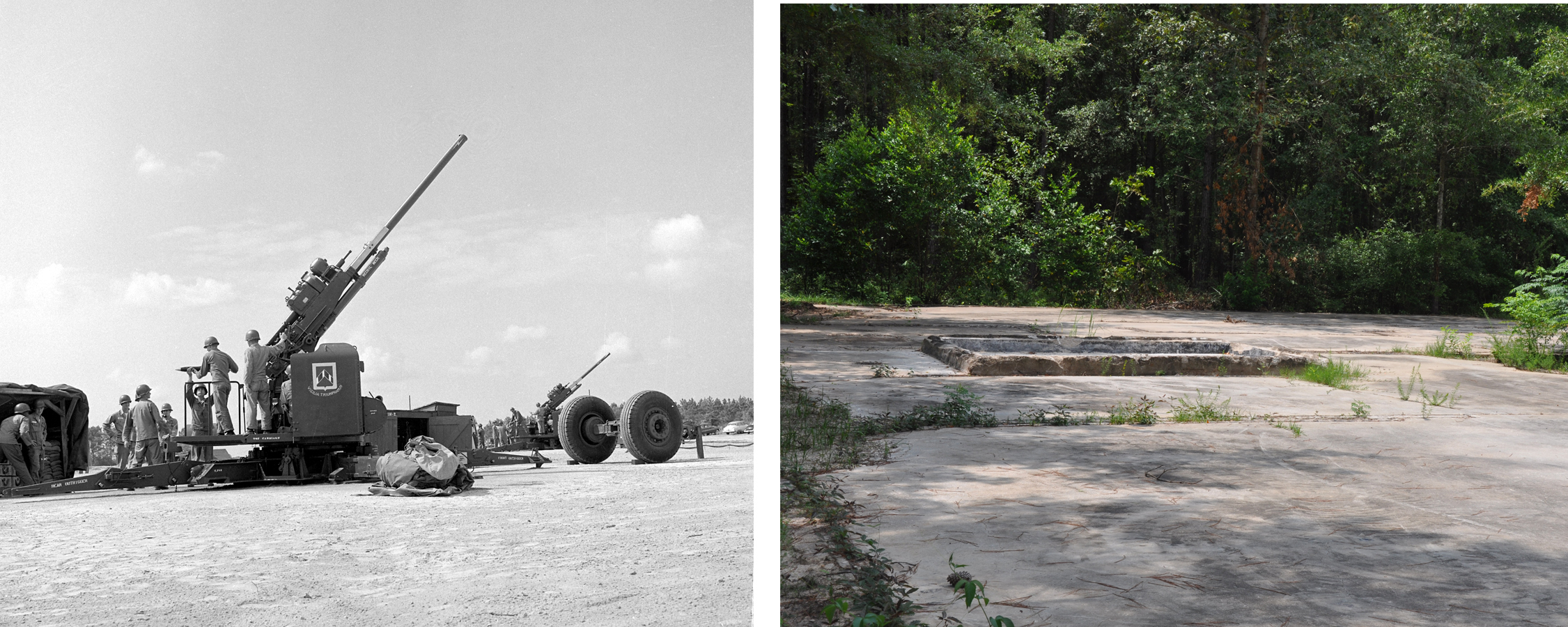
Anti-aircraft guns emplacements in 1955 (left) and 2010 (right). These guns defended the Savannah River Plant from 1955 until 1960, although there is no record of any threat of air attack.

Two rings of anti-aircraft gun sites were built surrounding the Savannah Plant. Four 90-mm gun sites were completed by April 1956 and a further thirteen 75-mm Skysweeper sites were under construction by September. The 33rd Anti-Aircraft Artillery (AAA) Battalion arrived in 1955. It had four batteries, each equipped with four 90-mm guns. Each 90-mm gun site had a concrete barracks built to house 120 men, a mess hall, gun emplacements, a motor pool area, an administration building, and a command post. The battalion had a computerized radar fire-control system that identified and tracked targets.

The 33rd AAA Battalion was soon joined by the 425th and 478th AAA Battalions, which were equipped with 75-mm Skysweeper guns. Together, the three battalions formed the 11th AAA Group, which in turn was part of the Army Air Defense Command. One of the star-shaped temporary buildings used during construction was refurbished for military use. The anti-aircraft guns were supposed to be an interim measure, to be replaced by Nike Hercules missiles, but this never occurred. In March 1957, the 33rd AAA Battalion departed and the 90-mm guns were removed. Further military construction was cancelled and excess construction materials were removed. The 425th and 478th remained for another two years before being disbanded. The last U.S. Army personnel departed on 20 January 1960, leaving the protection of the site to the U.S. Air Force and its jets from surrounding airbases in South Carolina and Georgia.

== Cold War era operations ==
=== Production ===
As the operators became more familiar with the reactors, they found that the power levels could be increased. C Reactor was built with twelve heat exchangers, but the others had only six due to limited supplies of heavy water and a shortage of heat exchangers. In 1956, the number of heat exchangers was increased to twelve on all five reactors, and the power output was increased from 378 MW to 2,250 MW. This in turn meant that the cooling water, which was discharged back into the river, was hotter. A 2,600-acre (1,100 ha) cooling pond, known as the P and R (or Par) Pond, was constructed in 1958 to allow water to cool before being discharged. P and R Reactors could also draw on Par Pond for cooling water, thereby saving pumping costs, and it made more river water available to the other reactors. This allowed C Reactor's power level to be raised to 2,575 MW in 1960, and then to 2,915 MW in 1967.

The Savannah River Plant produced basic materials for nuclear weapons, primarily tritium and plutonium-239, in its five nuclear reactors by irradiating target materials. It featured two chemical separation plants, known as "canyons", a heavy water extraction plant, a nuclear fuel and target fabrication facility, and the corresponding nuclear waste management infrastructure (landfills, waste seepage basins, waste tanks, and waste conditioning facilities). Plutonium production for defense purposes ceased in mid-1988.

By 1964, the United States had nine graphite-moderated production reactors at Hanford and five heavy-water production reactors at the SRP operating and upgraded with over 36,000 MW of production capacity in service. In comparison, fewer than 750 MW were needed to produce the strategic material for the Trinity test and Fat Man. Over the thirty years of operation, the Savannah River Plant produced about 36.1 metric tons of weapons-grade plutonium.

==== Computers ====
In the late 1950s, SRP pioneered the use of computers to enhance the productivity and safety of the production reactors. The operation of these reactors had become increasingly complex owing to the extensive manual oversight required to control various nuclear fuel types and to monitor targets irradiated at ever higher specific powers in 600 fuel positions. The first mainframe computers installed in the production reactors were the General Electric GE-412. The utility of on-line computers for process control was demonstrated in 1964, when they were used to process data from about 3,500 reactor process sensors and to alert operators to faulty instrument signals in the K reactor. By the end of the year, this system was scanning more signals than any other computer in the United States. As a result, on-line computers were installed in the three other operational reactors by the end of 1966.

In 1970, a closed loop controller system of the K reactor power began trial operation. Computers were used to control reactor power by moving its control rods in a stepwise manner, optimizing reactor performance. Closed-loop computer control was used for about 90% of the reactor production cycle. In 1971, K Reactor had become the first nuclear reactor to be controlled by computer. In the late 1970s, new computer systems were installed to provide dual safety functions and automatic safety backup functions. Following the lessons learned from the 1979 Three Mile Island accident, SRP computerized the automatic diagnosis alarms in 1982, using fault tree analysis to support plant operators in accidental situations.

==== Détente ====
In his 8 January 1964 State of the Union Address, President Lyndon B. Johnson announced a reduction in nuclear materials production, ostensibly as part of an initiative to slow the nuclear arms race, but in fact because production had outstripped demand. In 1964, there were nine production reactors at Hanford and five at the Savannah River Plant. The announcement was followed on 22 January by the AEC ordering the shutdown of F, DR and H Reactors at Hanford, and R Reactor at the Savannah River Plant. These were chosen for being the reactors in the worst condition; R Reactor had already sprung some heavy water leaks, and during a scheduled shut down on 22 April 1964, there was an unexpected power surge from 500 MW to 925 MW within 2.5 minutes. An internal DuPont report ranked this as one of the three worst reactor incidents at the SRP. R Reactor was shut down for good in June 1964.

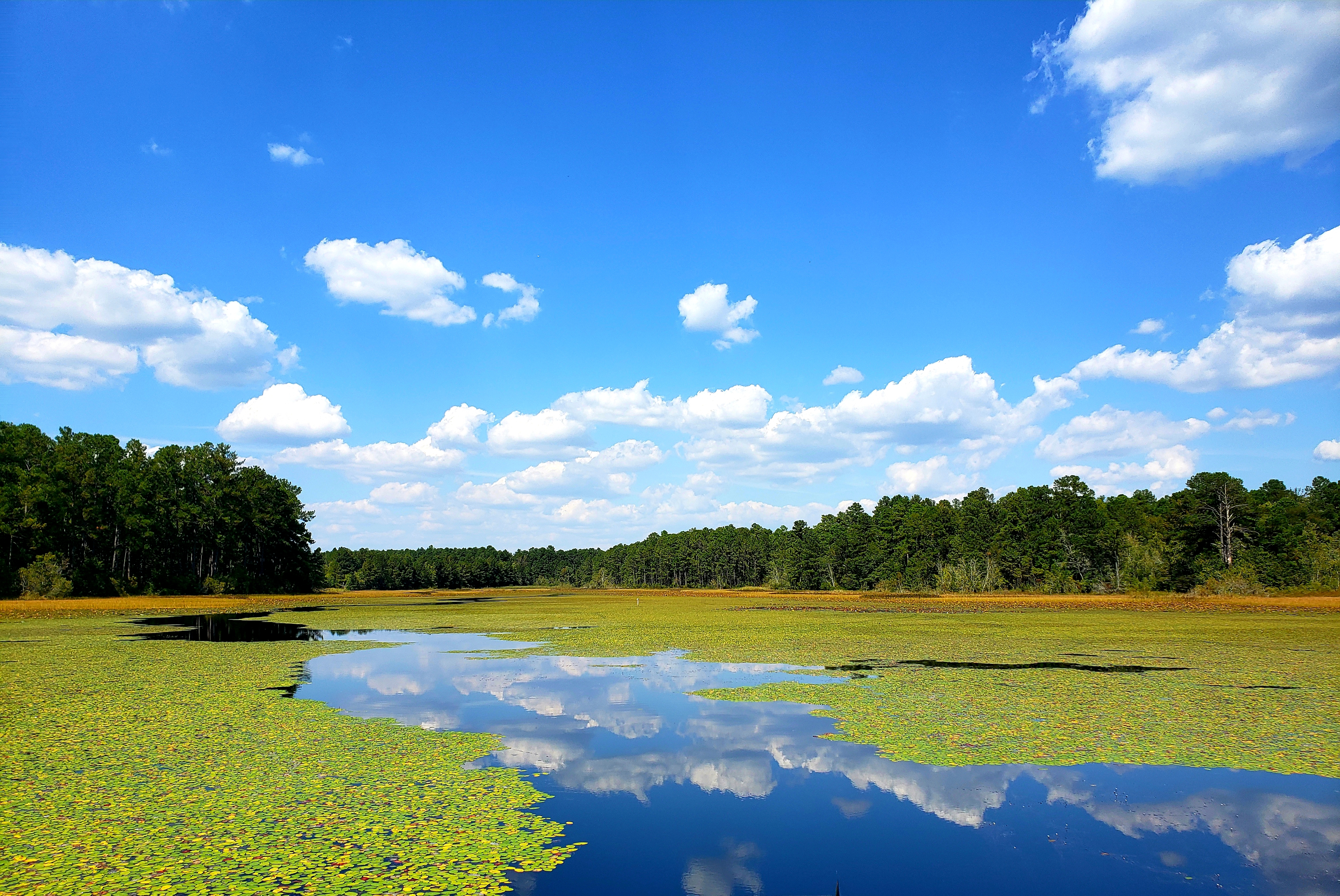
Par Pond

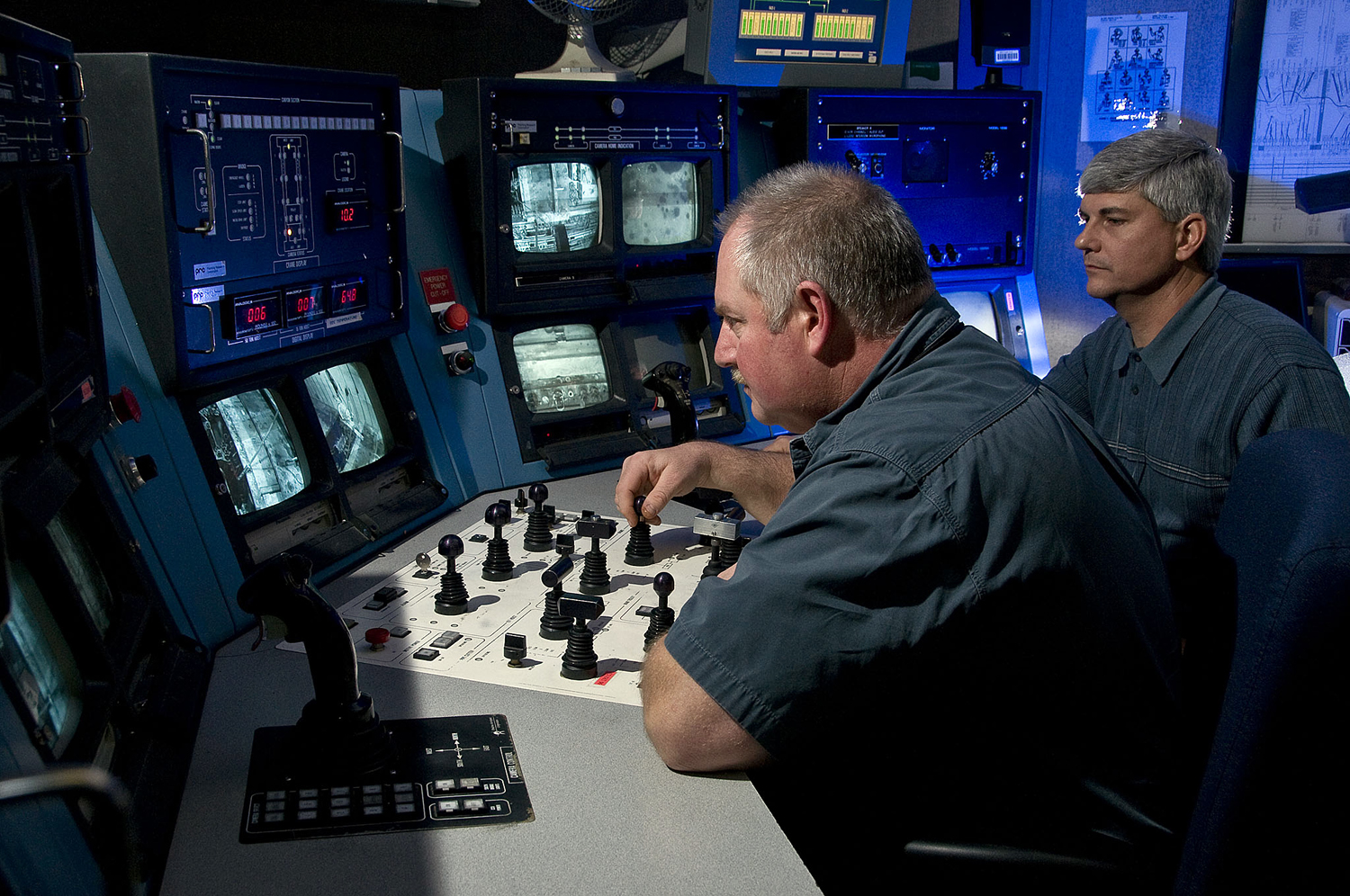
H Canyon crane control room

D Reactor was shut down at Hanford in 1967, and in January 1968, AEC chairman Glenn Seaborg announced that another reactor would be shut down at Hanford (B Reactor was selected) and one more at the Savannah River Plant. Although C Reactor had a history of leaks, L Reactor was chosen for shutdown, because C Reactor was used for tritium production and reconfiguring L Reactor would have cost more money.

By 1972, all the Hanford production reactors and reprocessing activities had been shut down and N Reactor converted to maximize electricity production. The nuclear weapons production complex was reduced to just four reactors: P, K, and C reactors at Savannah River Plant, able to keep pace with demand by operating at high power levels, and N reactor at Hanford which continued to operate as a dual-purpose reactor. The F and H canyon reprocessing facilities continued to operate. The last of the heavy water production units at the Savannah River Plant was closed in 1982.

==== Restart of plutonium production and reactor closures ====
By 1980, détente between the United States and the Soviet Union was starting to fray. The Soviet Union deployed SS-20 intermediate-range ballistic missiles in Eastern Europe, each carrying three nuclear warheads and capable of striking NATO bases and cities in Western Europe with little warning. As a reaction, NATO decided to deploy American Pershing II missiles and BGM-109G Ground Launched Cruise Missiles in Western Europe in an attempt to counter the SS-20 deployment, known as the NATO Double-Track Decision. The United States decided to increase fissile materials production to support a nuclear weapons modernization program.

On 11 April 1980, Secretary of Defense Harold Brown expressed doubts about the ability of the new United States Department of Energy (DOE) to meet the needs of the military-industrial complex. (Note: The DOE succeeded the short-lived Energy Research and Development Administration on 4 August 1977, which had assumed the functions of the AEC not assumed by the Nuclear Regulatory Commission on 11 October 1974.) The need for a new production reactor was debated in Congress, but the advocates of certain sites and technologies tended to cancel each other out, and years went by without action.

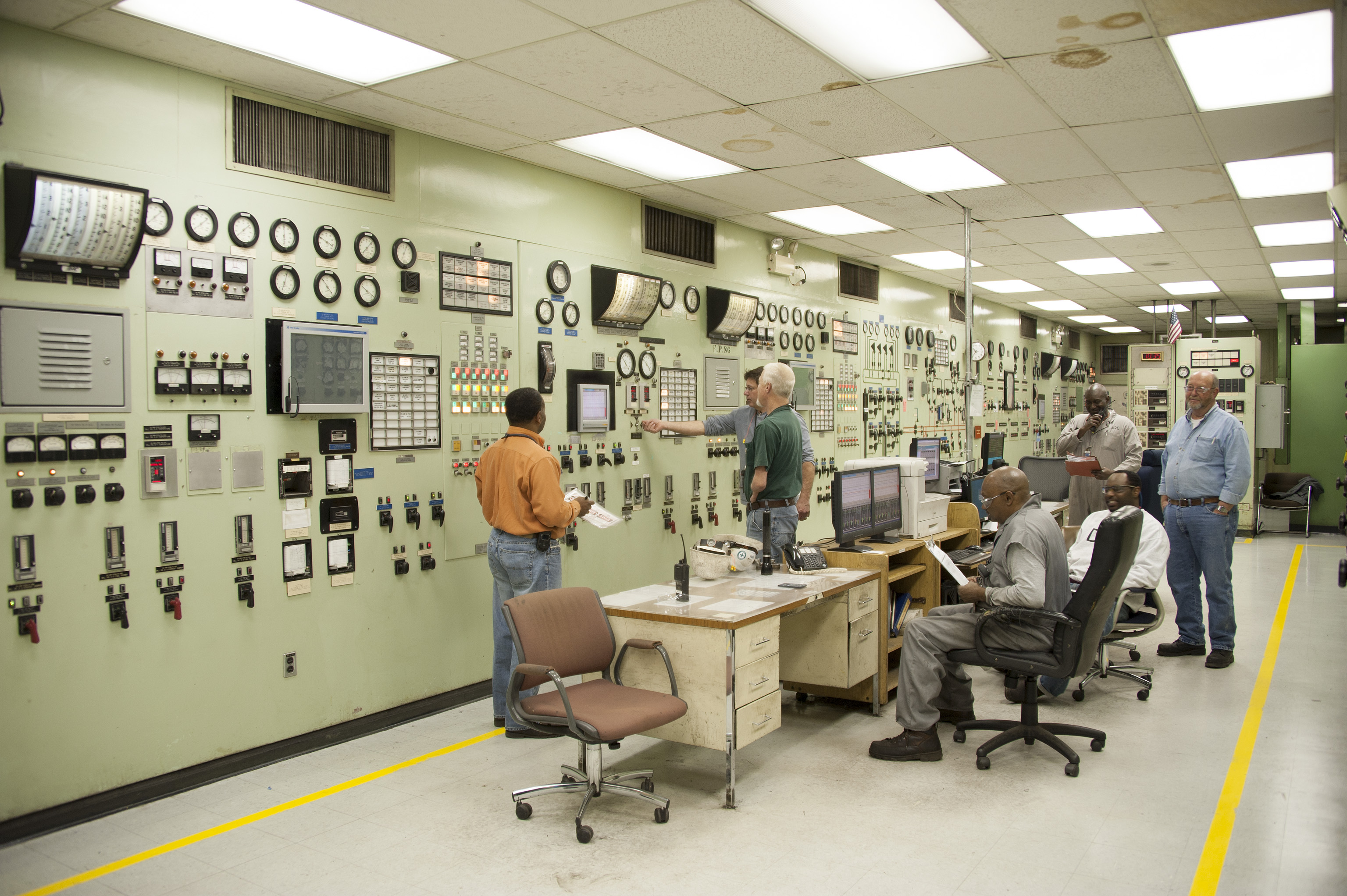
400-D Area Powerhouse Control Room

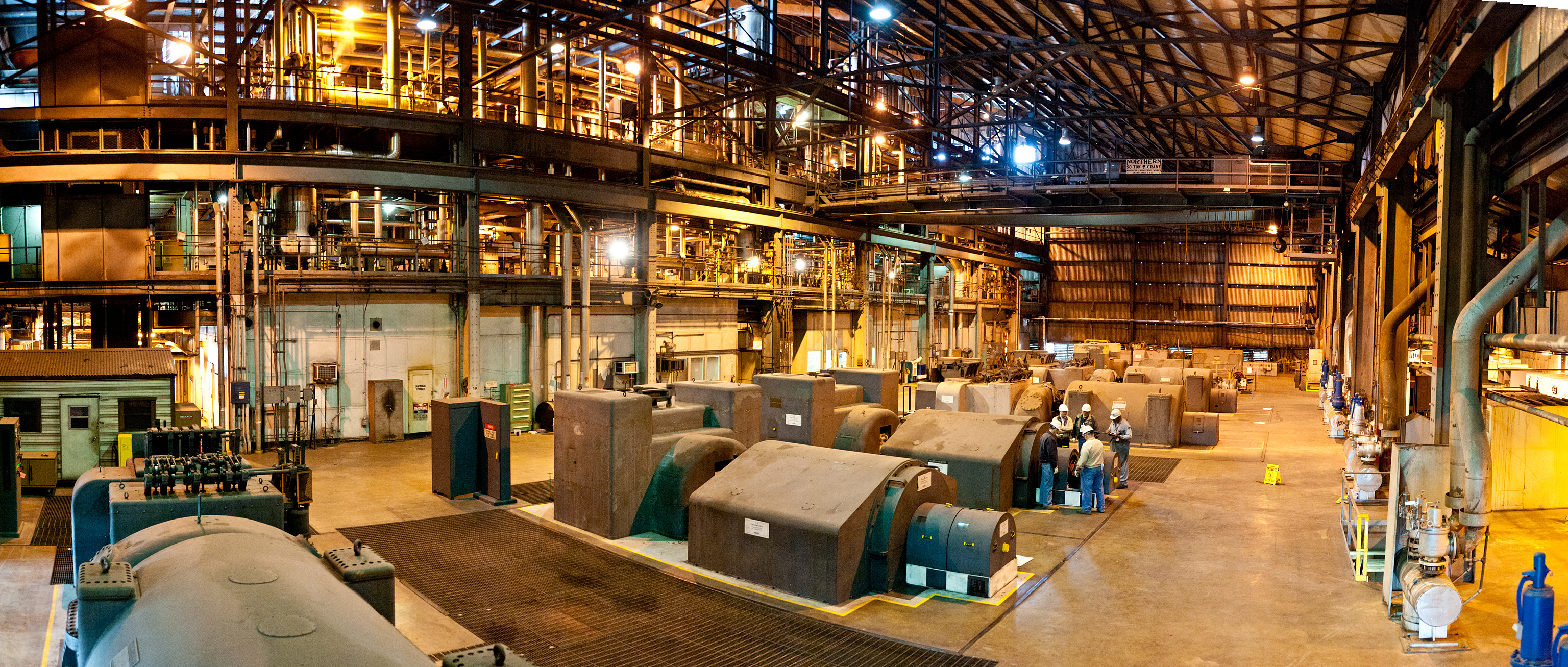
400-D Area Powerhouse

N Reactor at Hanford started producing plutonium again in 1982 and reprocessing in 1983. To meet the immediate need, the DOE decided to restart L Reactor. The renovation effort had a budget of $214 million (equivalent to $836 million in 2025) and employed a workforce of 800. It was the first time that a reactor on standby had been restarted after a hiatus of more than a decade. Asbestos insulation was removed and cooling pipes were replaced. The heat exchangers (and those of the R Reactor) were found to be in very poor condition, and repair was uneconomical. No bids were received from U.S. firms, so the contracts for new heat exchangers were awarded to two Japanese firms, Hitachi and Mitsui. Various safety upgrades that had already been installed on the other reactors were added. These included a new console, computer systems for control rod operations, and an improved emergency cooling system. Twelve years' worth of pigeon fecal waste had to be removed from the stack area.

By June 1983, the project was ahead of schedule and $10 million under budget, but then it hit a snag in the form of a series of lawsuits from individuals and organizations concerning the proposed discharge of hot water into Steel Creek and 14 curies (520 GBq) of caesium-137 from Steel Creek into the Savannah River. An environmental impact assessment was prepared, which found that the Savannah River water temperature would remain well under the 32 °C (90 °F) mandated by South Carolina law, and that the level of caesium-137 in river water immediately downstream would be 1/20,000th of the United States Environmental Protection Agency standard for drinking water.

Nonetheless, using Steel Creek as a sacrifice zone was no longer considered environmental best practice, and the discharge of 250,000 U.S. gallons per minute (16,000 L/s) of water at 93 °C (200 °F) would have been a violation of the standards for a commercial reactor. To address the objections, construction of a large cooling pond known as L Lake commenced in 1984. It was completed in 1985, allowing L Reactor to go critical again on 31 October 1985. The temperature of L Lake was kept to 32 °C (90 °F), which sometimes required restricting reactor operations in the summer months.

The DOE decided to produce weapon-grade plutonium by recovering the fuel-grade material produced in the N reactor since 1966 and by blending it with supergrade plutonium to produce weapon-grade plutonium. In 1985, the DOE configured the Savannah P, K, and C reactors to produce 2.8 tons of plutonium with 3% content ^{240}Pu for that purpose.

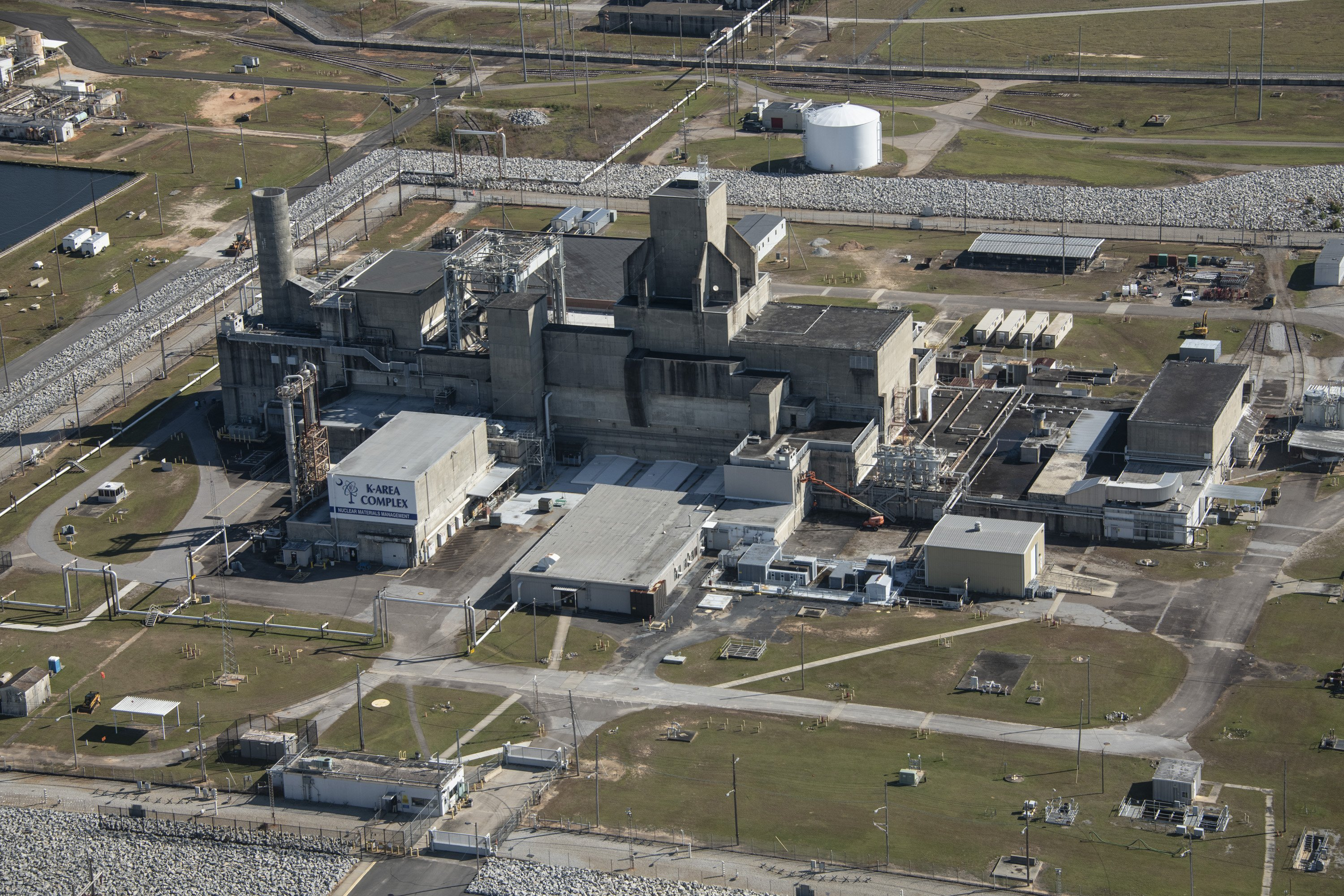
K Reactor

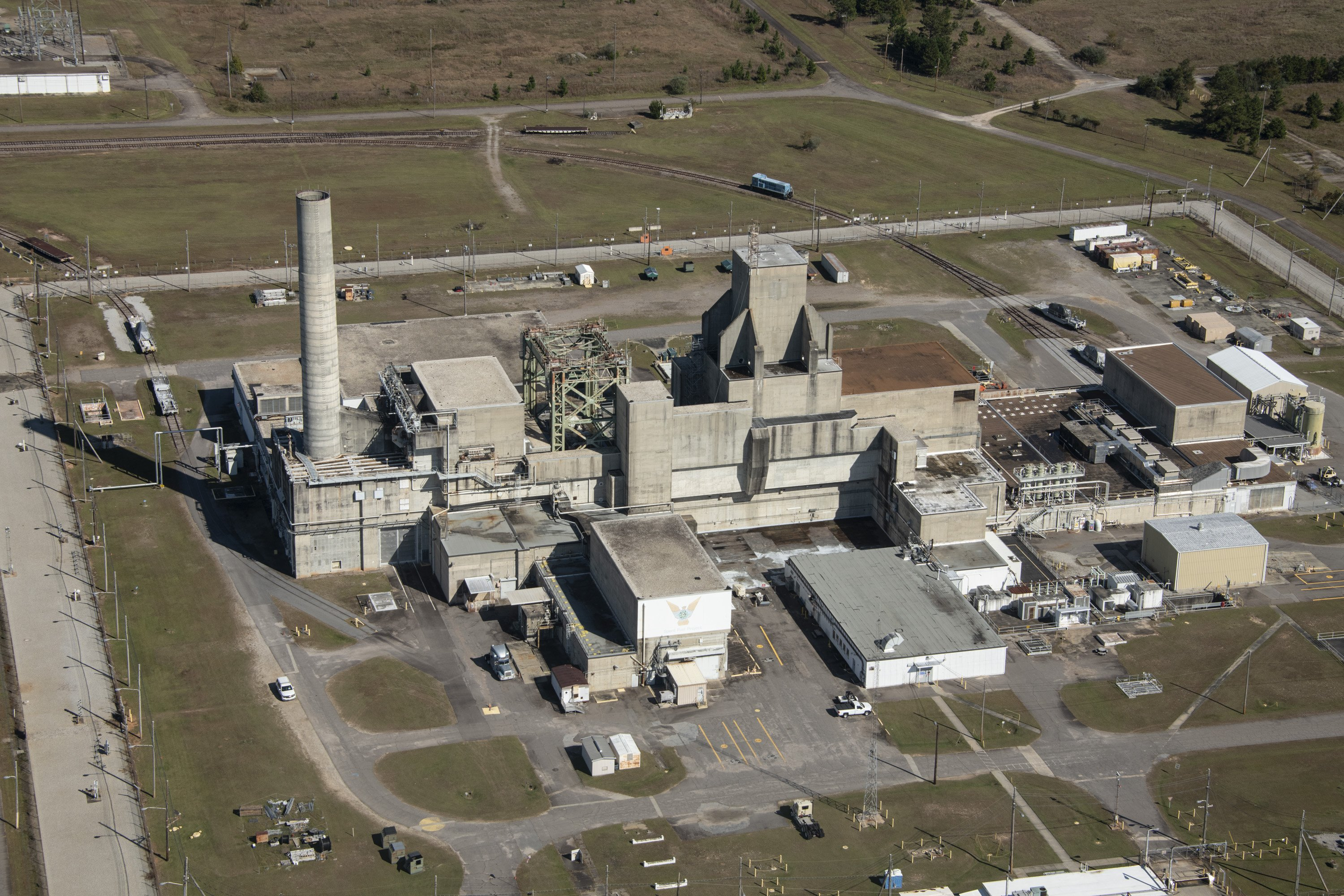
L Reactor

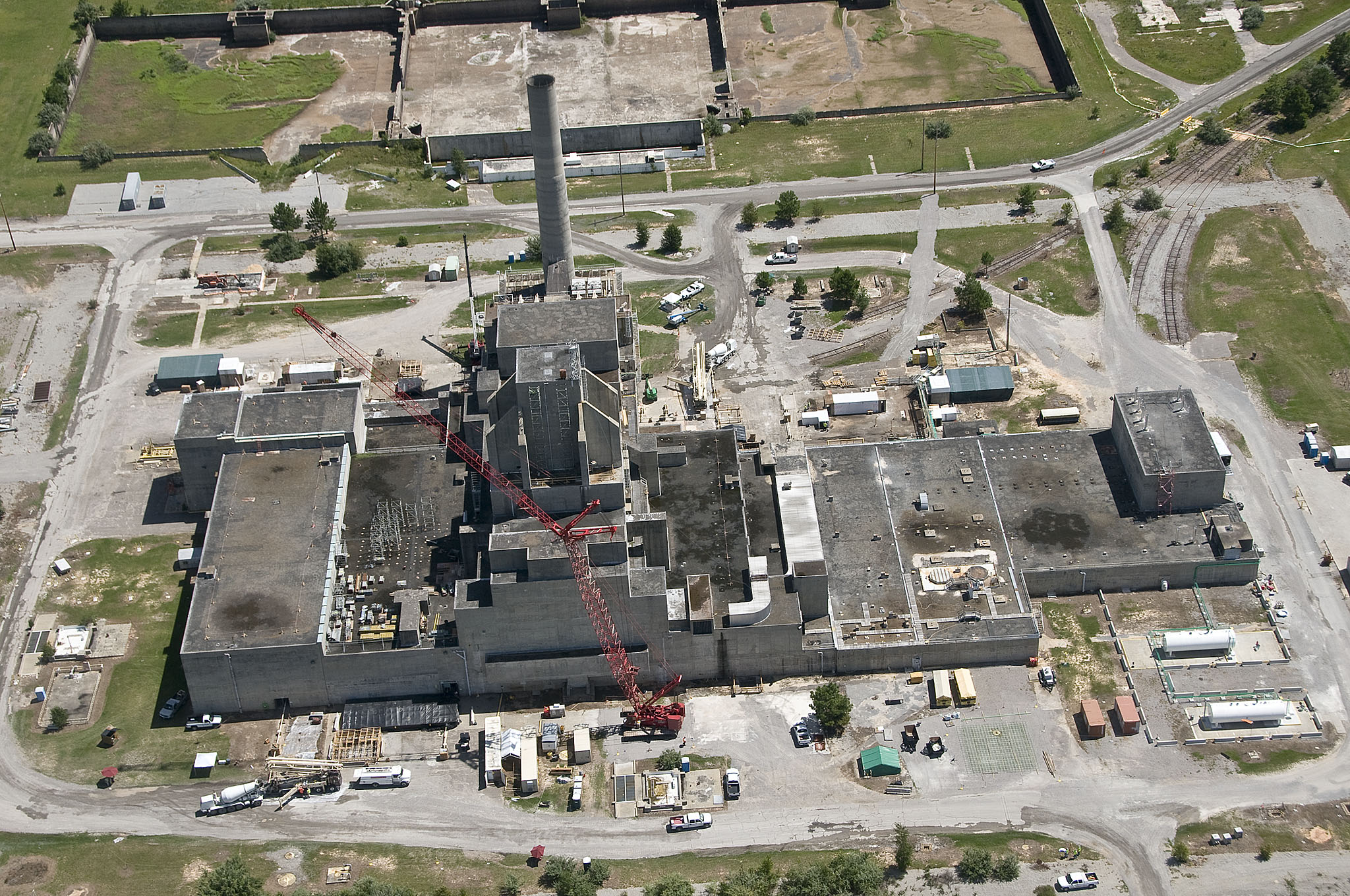
P Reactor

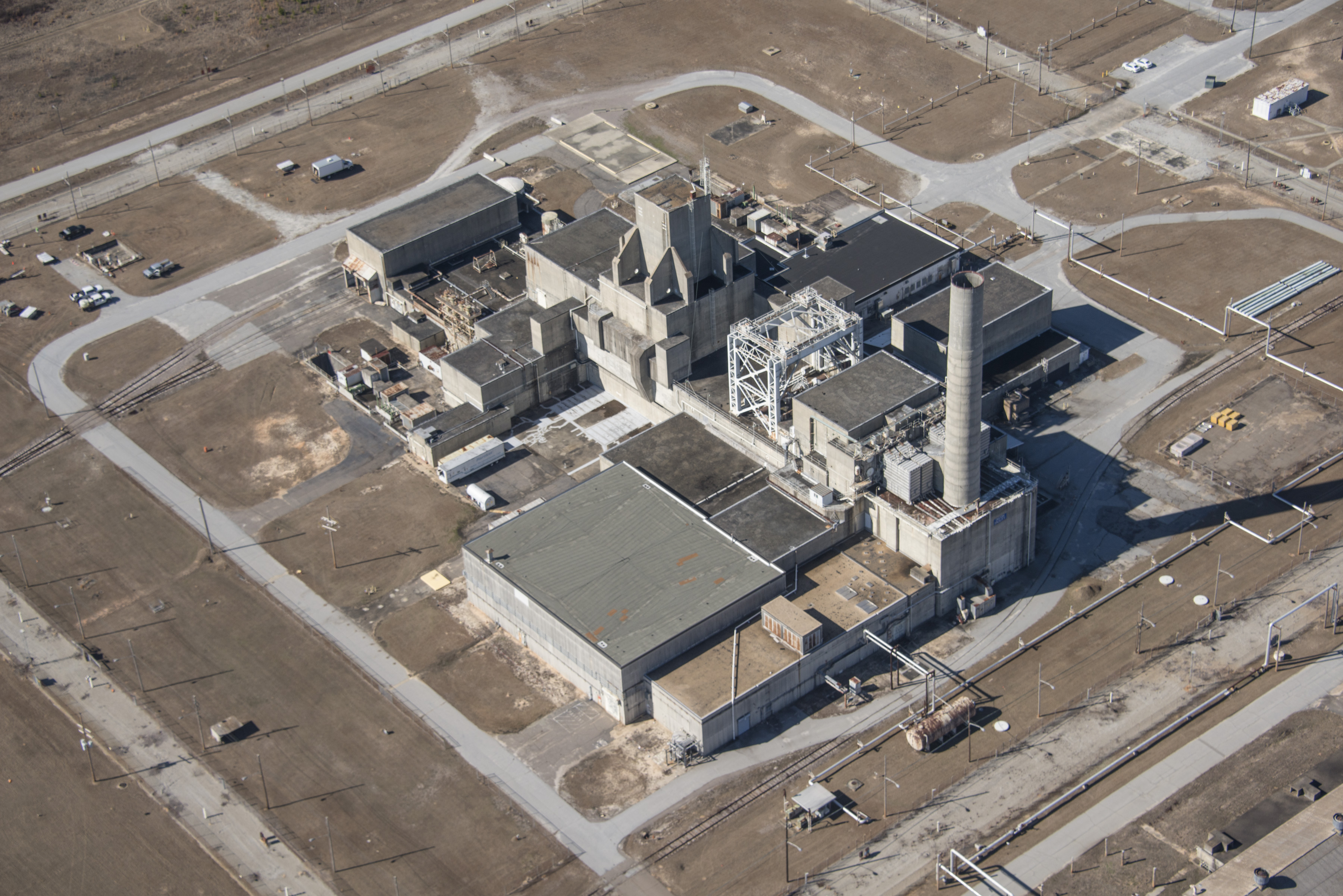
C reactor

C Reactor was shut down in June 1985 following another leak, and was not restarted after unsuccessful attempts to repair it. In March 1987, power level limits were instituted on K, L and P Reactors due to problems with the emergency core cooling system and the increased risk of a loss-of-coolant accident. Congress asked for sprinkler systems to be installed in the reactor buildings, but DuPont resisted this on the grounds that concrete structures did not easily burn. K reactor was put in an outage status in April 1988 and L Reactor in June as part of their normal operations but their restart never happened.

On 7 August 1988, operators attempted to restart P Reactor, which had been shut down since 10 April. By the following morning, a power level of 850 MW was attained, about 75% of the expected level, and it could not be raised without further removing control rods, which were already near their maximum positions. At this point, xenon, a potent neutron poison began to build up and the power level declined. When it reached 20 MW, the shift supervisor ordered a shutdown. The problem was traced to the decay of tritium in the core during the shutdown period, which had produced helium-3, a neutron poison. A new control rod configuration was drawn up, and the reactor restarted on 10 August. It ran normally until 17 August, when it was shut down again on orders from DuPont management.

This incident attracted media attention. What had been covered for years only in local and specialist publications now drew national attention. This triggered congressional hearings, and spurred the decision to implement much-needed nuclear safety improvements, enhance operator qualifications, and bolster management oversight before restarting any of the production reactors. A congressional committee hearing in September 1988 received a copy of an internal report listing over thirty significant incidents at the facility. These included: the near loss of control of L Reactor in 1960 when technicians tried to restart it; the "very significant leak" of heavy water from the C Reactor in May 1965 when 2,100 U.S. gallons (7,900 L) was spilt on the floor; a large radiation release in November 1970; and a melting of fuel rods in the C Reactor in December 1970. The national media confused "incidents" with "accidents".

By April 1989, when Westinghouse took over from DuPont, the United States had completely ceased production of weapons-grade plutonium. Between 1988 and 1993, the DOE invested over $2 billion in refurbishing the K, L, and P Reactors, but this refurbishment program was terminated, and the reactors remained shut down. One of Westinghouse's first actions was to rename the Savannah River Plant to the Savannah River Site, reflecting both the fact that there were several plants on the site and the shift of the primary focus from production of nuclear to other missions.

==== Chemical separation plants ====
F Canyon, the world's first operational full-scale PUREX separation plant, began radioactive operations in April 1954. PUREX (plutonium and uranium extraction) extracted plutonium and uranium from materials irradiated in the reactors. Plutonium was then stored as metal and uranium as an oxide. This processing resulted in the production of large amounts of highly radioactive liquid waste that was transferred for storage in two underground H- and F-tank farms at the site. The first plutonium shipment left the site on 28 December 1954. H Canyon, the second chemical separation facility, began operations in March 1955.

==== Tritium production ====
Permanent tritium facilities became operational and the first shipment of tritium to the AEC was made in 1955. The tritium plant originally planned for the H area was dropped during the initial construction project due to the drop in demand for tritium by the weapons program. As its requirements evolved, an improved plant was built and all tritium production shifted to the H area in 1958. Tritium produced in the K Reactor was finally transported to Mound Plant, a nuclear weapons research laboratory in Ohio, for purification by removing impurities and helium-3, considered a waste product and vented to the atmosphere.

==== Heavy water production ====
Heavy water is a form of water that contains two atoms of the hydrogen isotope deuterium, rather than the common protium isotope that makes up most of the hydrogen in ordinary water. Zinn's heavy-water-moderated reactors would each require up to 300 short tons (270 t) of heavy water, but the global inventory of heavy water in 1950 was less than 50 tons. During the war, the Manhattan Project's P-9 Project had produced heavy water at three DuPont munitions plants: the Morgantown Ordnance Works, near Morgantown, West Virginia; the Wabash River Ordnance Works, near Dana, Indiana; and the Alabama Ordnance Works, near Sylacauga, Alabama. They used a distillation process to extract heavy water from ordinary water, based on the slightly higher boiling point of heavy water. Final concentration was done by an electrolysis process at Morgantown, which used the property that heavy water did not dissociate under electrolysis as readily as light water. The production process was not very efficient, but the P-9 Project supplied 6.5 tons of heavy water that was used in CP-3, the world's first heavy water reactor, which was designed by Zinn.

The P-9 heavy water plants had been shut down in 1945 but research continued into heavy water production, with Harold Urey and Jerome S. Spevack investigating a new process called the Girdler sulfide (GS) process. This involved mixing hydrogen sulfide (H_{2}S) gas with water at different temperatures, under conditions where deuterium atoms prefer being bound to oxygen rather than sulfur. The AEC commissioners were initially skeptical of the new process, due to its high costs, but approved the construction of a pilot plant at the Wabash River Ordnance Works. Girdler, as a DuPont subcontractor, worked through the problems associated with the new process. The Dana pilot plant completed its first test run on 26 October 1950.

The increase in the number of reactors from two to five meant that the Wabash River Ordnance Works plant did not have sufficient capacity. A second GS facility was therefore authorized in January 1951, to be built in the 400-D area at the SRP. This construction had top priority, as the reactors could not operate without their heavy water. Despite concerns, about 250 short tons (230 t) of heavy water was produced by the time the first reactor, R Reactor, was ready. In addition to the GS units, the plant had twelve distillation towers for the second step, and an electrolysis building for the final step. The facility had its own pumping station to bring river water and a power station to supply electricity and steam that could burn up to 350 short tons (320 t) of coal per hour.

AEC chairman Lewis Strauss visited the SRP in March 1955, and announced that the United States was going to sell Italy 10 short tons (9.1 t) of heavy water for its first research reactor. In 1956, the market price of heavy water was $28 per pound ($62/kg) or $14,000 per drum (equivalent to $166,000 in 2025). Subsequently, Australia, Canada, France, Norway, Sweden, Switzerland and the United Kingdom received heavy water under the AEC's Atoms for Peace program. Production of heavy water peaked in 1969 when 412,000 kg (908,400 lb) was produced. In 1970, $27 million worth (equivalent to $580.33 million in 2025) was sold to Canada for use in the Pickering Nuclear Generating Station. That year, 842,200 kg (1,856,800 lb) of heavy water was sold for $50,656,000 (equivalent to $599,873,684 in 2025). It was the only product of the production facility that made money.

=== Neutrino discovery ===
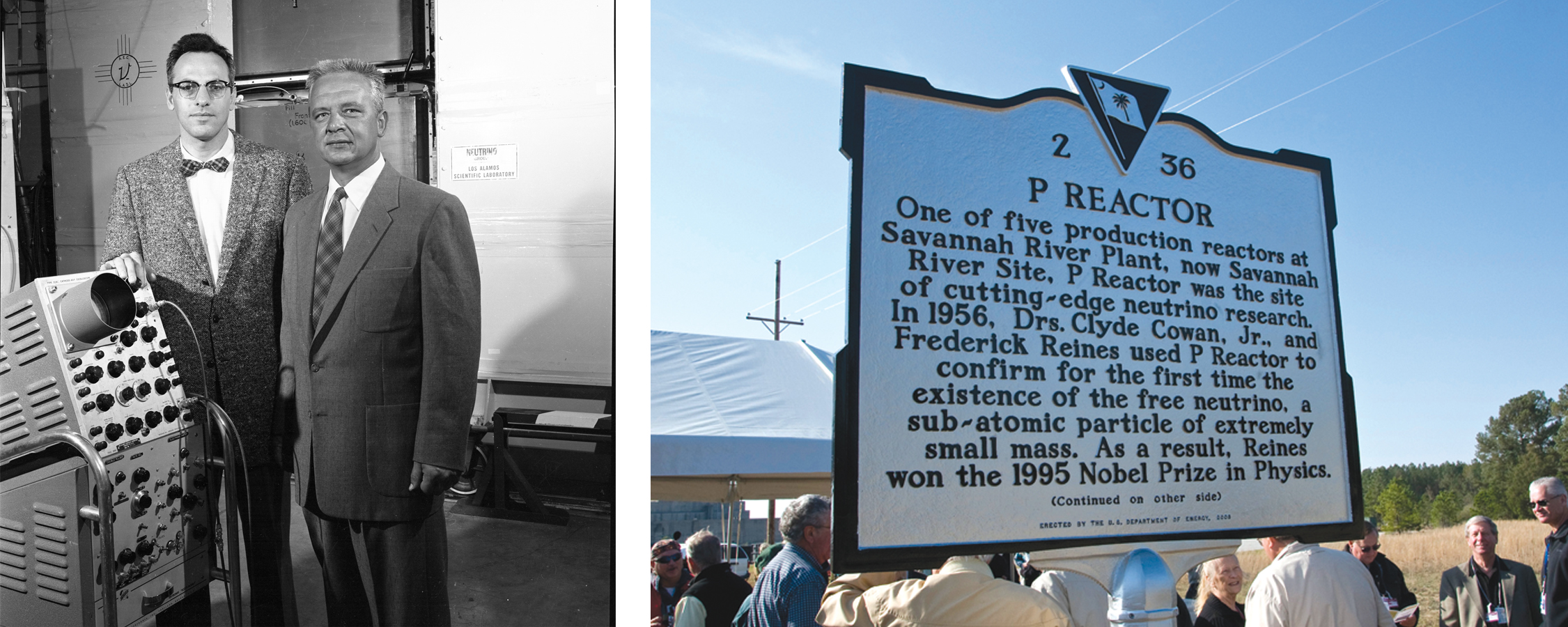
In 1956, Clyde Cowan (right) and Frederick Reines (left) came from the Los Alamos Scientific Laboratory to perform an experiment in which they proved the existence of the neutrino.

The neutrino was a hypothetical particle whose existence was first suggested by Wolfgang Pauli in 1930 as a means of reconciling the apparent loss of energy that occurred during beta decay. There was still doubt about whether they existed in 1952, when Frederick Reines and Clyde Cowan at the Los Alamos Scientific Laboratory set out to find them using a nuclear reactor, a good source of neutrinos. Their first attempts at Hanford in 1953 were unsuccessful. In 1954, their team transferred their research to the Savannah River Plant, where they set up several truckloads of equipment at the P Reactor. The neutrino detector, weighing approximately 10 tons excluding its shielding, was composed of two large, flat plastic tanks, each containing 200 liters of water with trace amounts of cadmium chloride, positioned between three scintillation detectors, which incorporated a total of 1,400 liters of liquid scintillator and 110 photomultiplier tubes in total. This time, neutrinos were detected, and they announced their discovery in the 20 July 1956 issue of Science. Reines was awarded the 1995 Physics Nobel Prize for the discovery; Cowan had already died. Neutrino research continued at P Reactor, sponsored by the University of California, Irvine, until the reactor was shut down in 1988.

=== Heavy Water Components Test Reactor ===
The use of heavy water put the Savannah River Plant on a different path to the commercial nuclear power plant industry, as pressurized water reactors using enriched fuel and light water as a moderator and coolant became the technology of choice in the United States. The AEC did not give up on the idea of heavy water reactors though, and in 1956 initiated a project to demonstrate the feasibility of electric power production using heavy water and evaluate various components for their suitability in heavy water reactors. At first, it was to be a small reactor with an electric power output of 100 MW, but this was raised to 400 MW after studies indicated that 100 MW would be uneconomical. The use of heavy water would add to the capital cost, but this could be offset by the use of cheaper natural uranium as fuel instead of enriched uranium. DuPont doubted that it would be competitive with conventional fossil fuel power plants.

Heavy Water Components Test Reactor

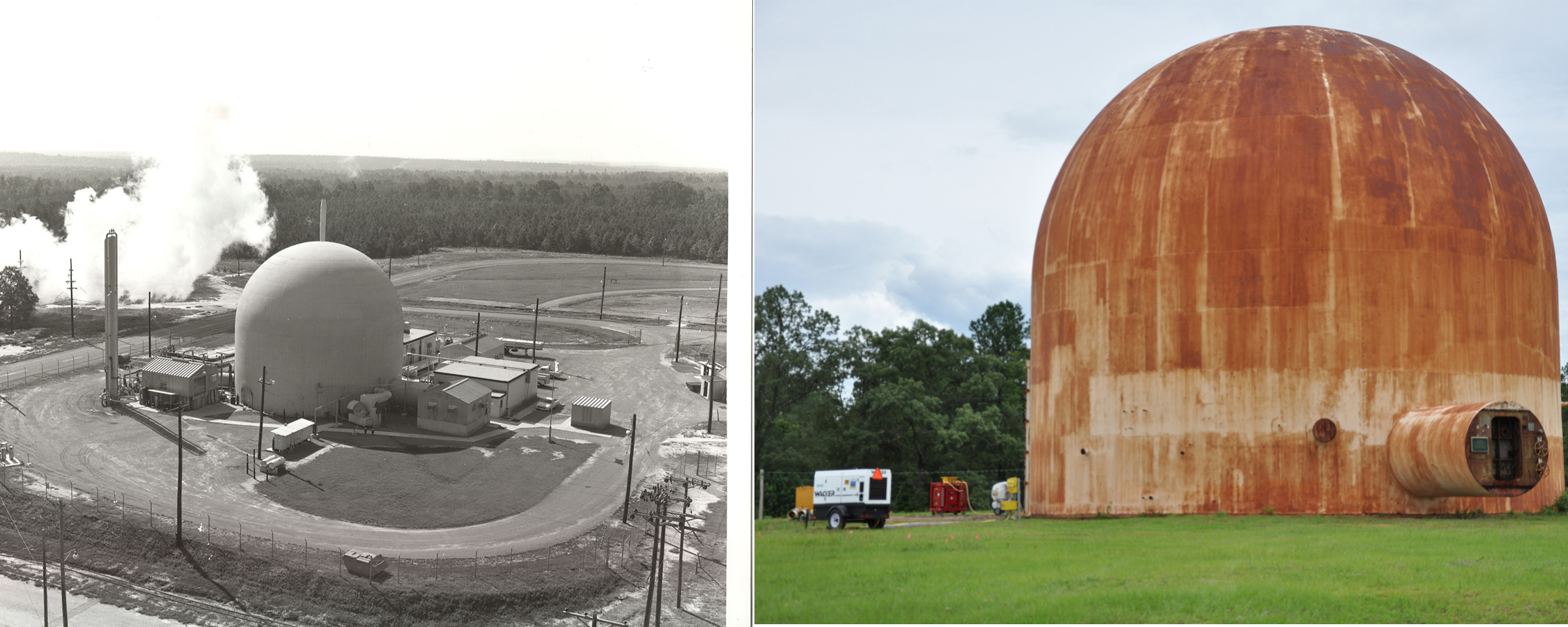
In 1964 and 2010

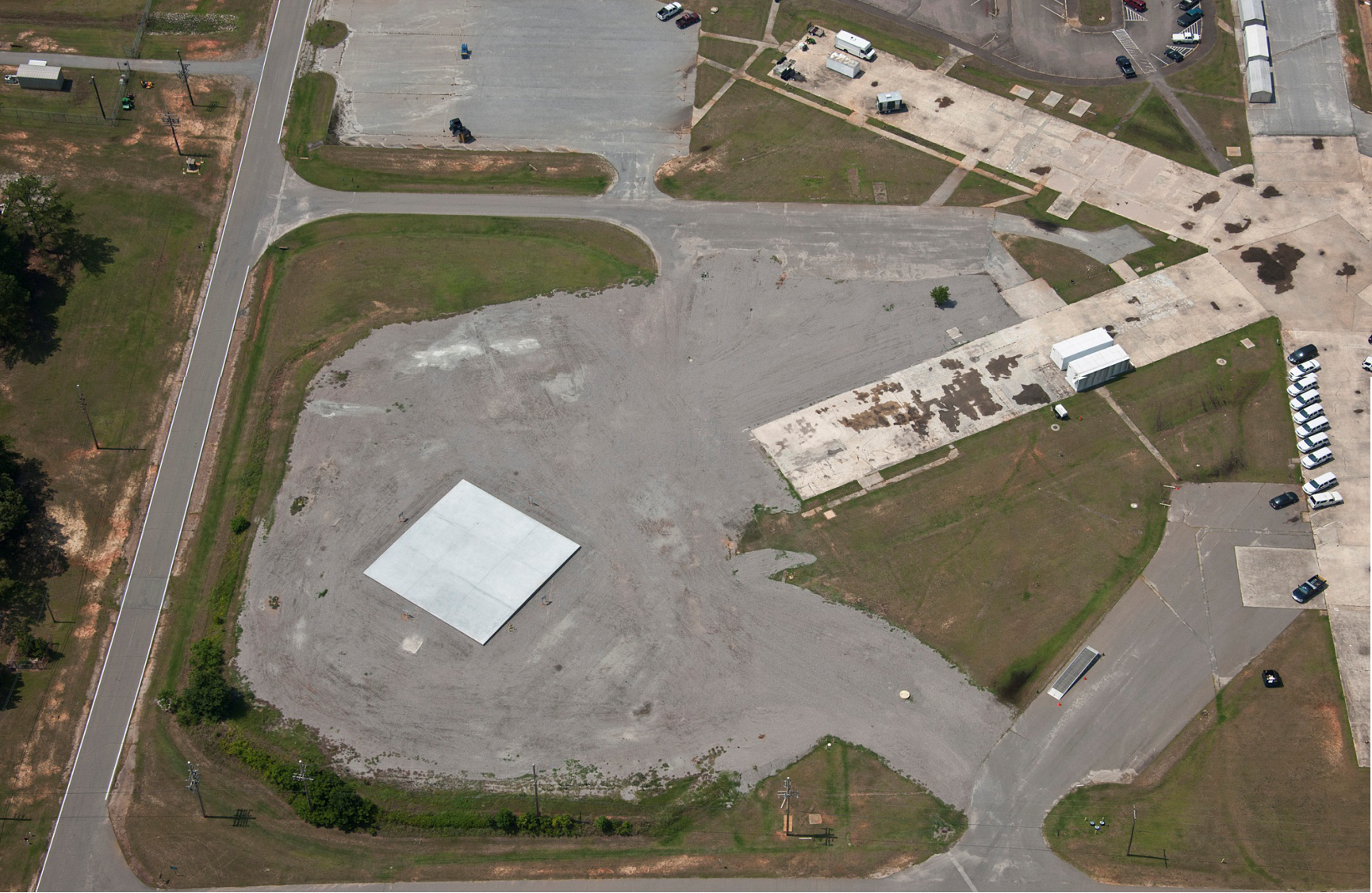
Concrete cap after decommissioning in 2011

DuPont chose to build the reactor at the Savannah River Plant, as this was where all the expertise in heavy water reactors resided. It was originally planned to build it in the K Area, but AEC feared that this might compromise the security of the production reactors, so a site was chosen in the old temporary construction area adjacent to the TC-1 administrative building. Construction commenced in 1959, and after a series of delays, the Heavy Water Components Test Reactor (HWCTR, known as "Hector") was completed in October 1961, and started up in 1962. Although the suitability of heavy water reactors for power generation was demonstrated, the savings on fuel were insufficient to offset the cost of the heavy water, and the AEC decided to curtail their development. Operations at the HWCTR were terminated in December 1964 and the reactor placed in standby status. The heavy water and fuel assemblies were removed in 1965. In 2009 the American Recovery and Reinvestment Act (ARRA) provided a $1.6 billion (equivalent to $2.4 billion in 2025) to seal and decommission the reactor. This work was completed in June 2011.

Despite AEC efforts to promote heavy-water power reactors, U.S. utility companies had already shown by 1962 a clear preference for pressurized light-water reactor technology that originated in the U.S. Navy's propulsion reactors program and had been demonstrated at the Shippingport Atomic Power Station. The AEC 1954 Atoms for Peace program, by providing electric utilities with enriched uranium, also played a crucial role in this choice. Consequently, the heavy-water reactor's key advantage of using natural uranium became less significant, as enriched uranium grew more readily available in the United States. As a result, the Carolinas–Virginia Tube Reactor remained United States' only commercial heavy water reactor. Canada developed its own heavy water power reactor design, later known as CANDU, based on natural uranium fuel, a strategic choice given that uranium enrichment facilities at the time were predominantly operated for military purposes, despite the fact that heavy water represented up to 20% of the total capital cost of each CANDU power plant in the 1970s.

=== Radioisotope production ===
==== Space exploration ====
During the 1950s, there was also research conducted at the SRP into heat and power sources that could be used in the Arctic and in space. Early research concerned cobalt-60, which was not only a heat source, but could also be used for food irradiation. Cobalt-60 was produced at the SRP between 1955 and 1967, and was used as a heat source by Distant Early Warning Line stations in Alaska, Canada and Greenland. Plutonium-238 proved to be an ideal source of radioisotope heater unit sources and radioisotope thermoelectric generators (RTGs) for space exploration: it was easily shielded and with a half-life of about 88 years, it could power a spacecraft for a long mission. The AEC gave the SRP the mission of producing plutonium-238 in the late 1950s.

Plutonium-238 from the SRP was first used in the early 1960s by the U.S. Navy's Transit navigation and NASA's Nimbus 3 meteorological satellites. It was taken to the Moon by the Project Apollo missions (where it was used to power the Apollo Lunar Surface Experiments Packages left on the Moon; to Mars by the Viking program; solar orbit by the Ulysses spacecraft; Jupiter by the Galileo spacecraft; Saturn by the Cassini–Huygens project; and the outer reaches of the Solar System by the Voyager program spacecraft.

Plutonium-238 was produced by the irradiation of neptunium-237, a byproduct of the irradiation of uranium in the reactors that occurred when uranium-235 captured two neutrons. This creates uranium-237, which has a half-life of 6.7 days, decaying into neptunium-237 through beta decay. The neptunium-237 was recovered and purified, and then irradiated to produce plutonium-238. When work began in the late 1950s, there was already a large body of literature on the chemistry of neptunium and plutonium. An anion exchange process was used to separate neptunium(IV) nitrate (Np(NO_{3})_{4}) and plutonium(IV) nitrate (Pu(NO_{3})_{4}) from uranium. The plutonium (IV) nitrate was then reduced to plutonium (III) nitrate (Pu(NO_{3})_{3}) and a second anion exchange process separated neptunium(IV) nitrate from plutonium (III) nitrate. The neptunium nitrate was then precipitated as neptunium(IV) oxalate (Np(C_{2}O_{4})_{2}), which was heated in air to 550 °C (1,020 °F) to produce neptunium dioxide (NpO_{2}) and clad with aluminium to create targets suitable for irradiation in the reactors. The processing of neptunium-237 to create targets began in 1961.

Throughout the 1960s and well into the 1970s, plutonium-238 was then shipped to the Mound Laboratories as an oxalate or a nitrate and subsequently as an oxide to enter into any one of the following processes for the production of heat source materials: pressed plutonium oxide, plutonium-molybdenum cermet, or plutonium metal. In September 1971, the AEC decided to transfer from Mound Laboratories to the SRP the production of plutonium-molybdenum cermet, a nuclear fuel form consisting of sintered ~80% plutonium-238 in oxide form embedded in metallic molybdenum. In 1972–1973, the original scope of the Plutonium Fuel Form (PUFF) Facility was expanded to include the fabrication of pressed plutonium-238 oxide (PPO) spheres or pellets and the iridium encapsulation of the PPO spheres to eliminate the need for transporting plutonium-238 powder in the public domain. The construction began in 1973 and became operational in 1977. Although cermet discs were never fabricated at PUFF, the production of iridium-encapsulated 100-watt PPO spheres for Multi-Hundred Watt RTGs started in 1978 and was completed in April 1980.

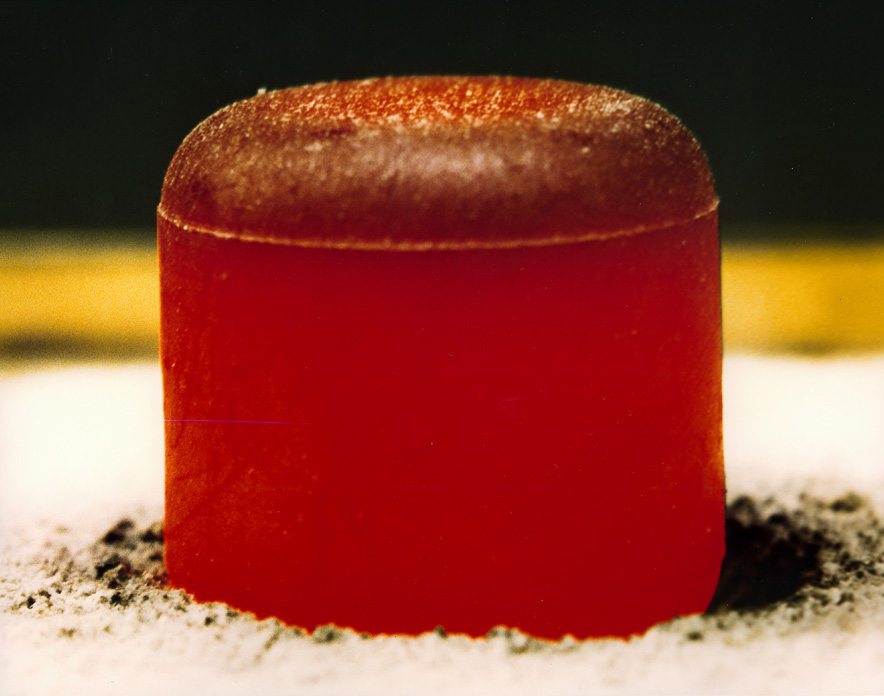
A pellet of Plutonium-238

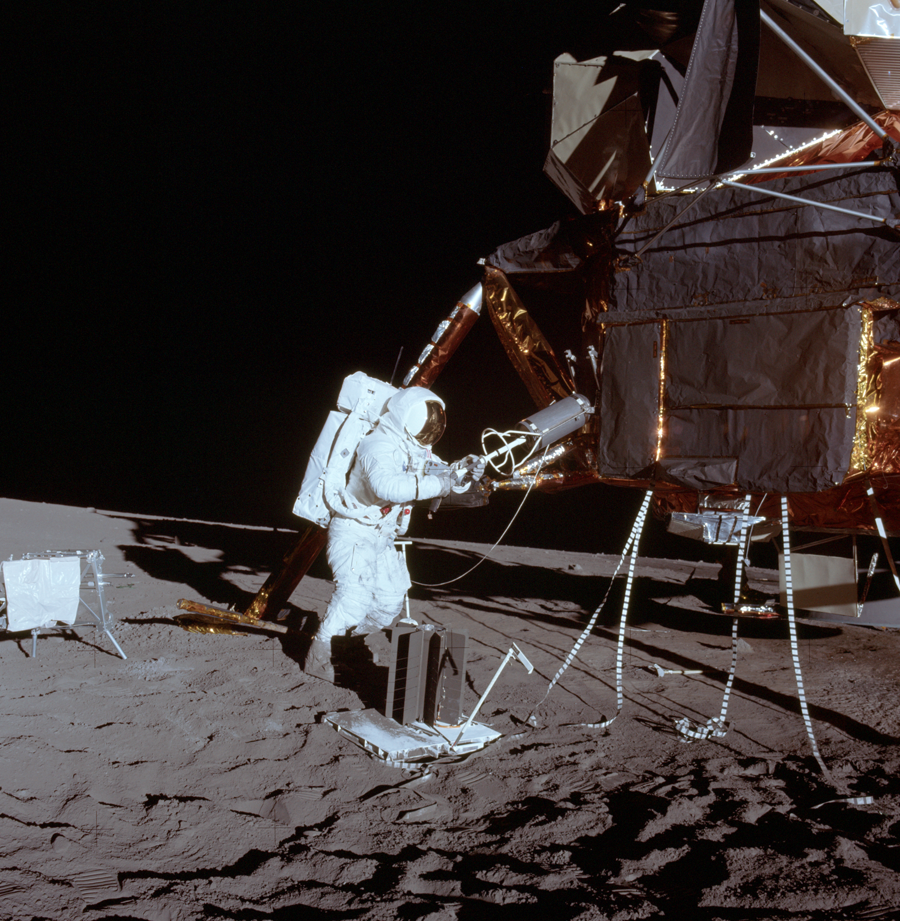
Apollo 12 astronaut Alan Bean unloads the plutonium core that powered the ALSEP on the Ocean of Storms.

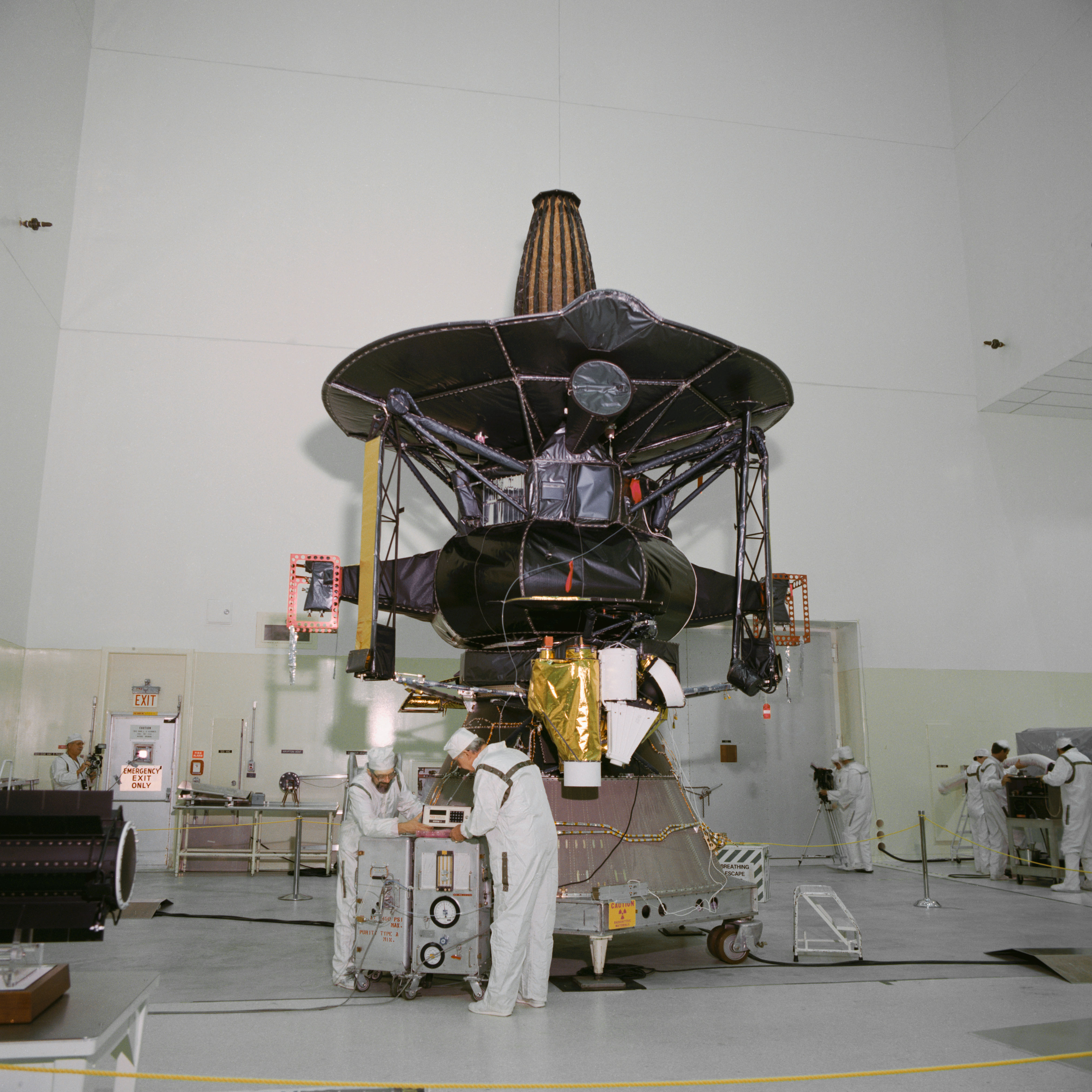
Galileo spacecraft

The general-purpose heat sources used by Galileo, Ulysses and Cassini each contained seventy-two cylindrical plutonium dioxide (^{238}_{94}PuO_{2}) pellets that were fabricated at the SRP from June 1980 until December 1983. The fabrication process involved hot pressing to induce the sintering of the plutonium-238 oxide. Each pellet was approximately 2.7 cm by 2.7 cm, weighed about 150 g, and radiated 62.5 W of heat. Seventy-two of them in a radioisotope thermoelectric generator (RTG) generated about 285 W of electrical power. Galileo had two RTGs (totaling 22 kg of plutonium-238); Ulysses had one; Cassini had three.

Production of plutonium-238 at PUFF, at a rate of about 20 kg per year, was put on hold in December 1983 and ceased in 1988 when the production reactors were shut down. Between 1978 and 1984, the PUFF facility produced approximately 165 kilograms of iridium-encapsulated PPO spheres and pellets for use as radioisotope thermal generators, primarily for the space program. This stockpile was projected to be depleted in 2018. In 2015, the U.S. Department of Energy decided to address the impending shortage of Pu-238 fuel for future NASA missions and restarted its production at Oak Ridge National Laboratory leveraging both the High Flux Isotope Reactor at Oak Ridge and the Advanced Test Reactor at Idaho National Laboratory.

==== Synthesis of transplutonium isotopes ====
The U.S. Transplutonium Production Program began in 1959 with irradiations in SRP's reactors and in the High Flux Isotope Reactor at Oak Ridge National Laboratory. The SRP also produced heavier transplutonium elements, including plutonium-242, curium-244 and californium-252. Curium-244 production began in C Reactor in May 1964. The work was done in two stages. In the first, plutonium-239 was irradiated to produce plutonium-242. In the second stage, between February 1965 and February 1966, plutonium-242 was irradiated to produce curium-244 in C and K Reactors. In the process, a small amount of californium was also created. For high neutron flux operations, cobalt-59 is preferred over lithium for the control rods, as the latter tended to melt at high temperatures. As a result, some cobalt-60 with 700 curies per gram (26,000 GBq/g) was produced. Another curium-244 production run was carried out in K Reactor between December 1965 and May 1967. The result of all this work was 5.9 kilograms of curium-244 and about three milligrams of californium-252.

Between August 1969 and November 1970, an effort was made to produce gram-scale amounts of californium-252 in K Reactor to develop a market for californium-252 neutron sources. Eighty-six targets containing more than 8 kilograms of plutonium-242 were irradiated for ten years. Twenty-one targets were processed in 1972–1973 at Oak Ridge National Laboratory (ORNL) to recover about 4 grams of plutonium-244, "heavy curium" (i.e., curium rich in curium-246 and curium-248) and about 2.1 grams of californium-252, but an incident occurred in November 1970 when an antimony-beryllium control rod melted. The cleanup took three months, and effectively ended the Transplutonium Production Program at SRP. Production of californium-252 and other transuranium isotopes for research, industrial, and medical applications continued at the High Flux Isotope Reactor at ORNL. The DOE distribution center for californium-252 transitioned from the SRP to the ORNL in the late 1980s.

=== Whistleblower ===
The case of Roger D. Wensil, a pipe-fitter, who worked for the B.F. Shaw Co., a subcontractor at Savannah River Plant, stands as a significant milestone in the evolution of whistleblower protection in the U.S. nuclear sector. Dismissed in 1985 after raising concerns about safety violations and illegal drug trafficking among construction personnel at a nuclear waste-handling facility at SRP, he filed a claim under the nuclear safety whistleblower law but was dismissed as it was found to not apply to nuclear weapons facilities. After involving the press, DOE ordered Wensil to be rehired.

Wensil's case evidenced a significant deficiency in legal protections for employees working under DOE contractors. In 1992, the section 2902 "Employee protection for nuclear whistleblowers" of the 1992 Energy Policy Act, amending 1974 Energy Reorganization Act, extended the whistleblower protection to DOE contractor employees, establishing the legal framework for nuclear weapons whistleblower protection.

=== Environmental monitoring ===
DuPont started its environmental stewardship program for SRP when the Site's acquisition process was still on-going. In accordance with its company policy, DuPont decided to establish the pre-operational environmental baseline to be able to monitor the future impact of the Savannah River Plant on its environment. This stewardship later evolved into full-fledged research programs that monitored and continue to explore the impact of the site on the environmental health of the surrounding ecosystems, turning SRP into an early center of ecological activity in the United States, with research projects on old-field succession, thermal ecology, radioecology, environmental chemistry, and toxicology.

In 1950, once the contract was formally awarded, DuPont integrated Ruth Patrick and her team from the Academy of Natural Sciences of Philadelphia (ANSP) into the Savannah River Project to study the river's biological diversity prior to the operation of the planned SRP reactors, which were anticipated to elevate the river's water temperature. The land surrounding the production facilities became a protected buffer zone that would become part of the Savannah River Ecology Laboratory led by Eugene P. Odum. Their reports studied the biological conditions on the river and surrounding wetlands. Earlier studies had tended to use certain species as indicators of the health of the environment; Patrick's team examined all the major plant and animal species and noted the interaction between them, something that had not been done before on an area of this size. The methods they developed were later employed on studies of the Amazon River. After the initial survey, ANSP scientists carried out studies at three- to five-year intervals. Between 1954 and 1968, water as hot as 45 °C (113 °F) was discharged into Steel Creek, resulting in the gradual destruction of the vegetation over a thirty-year period.

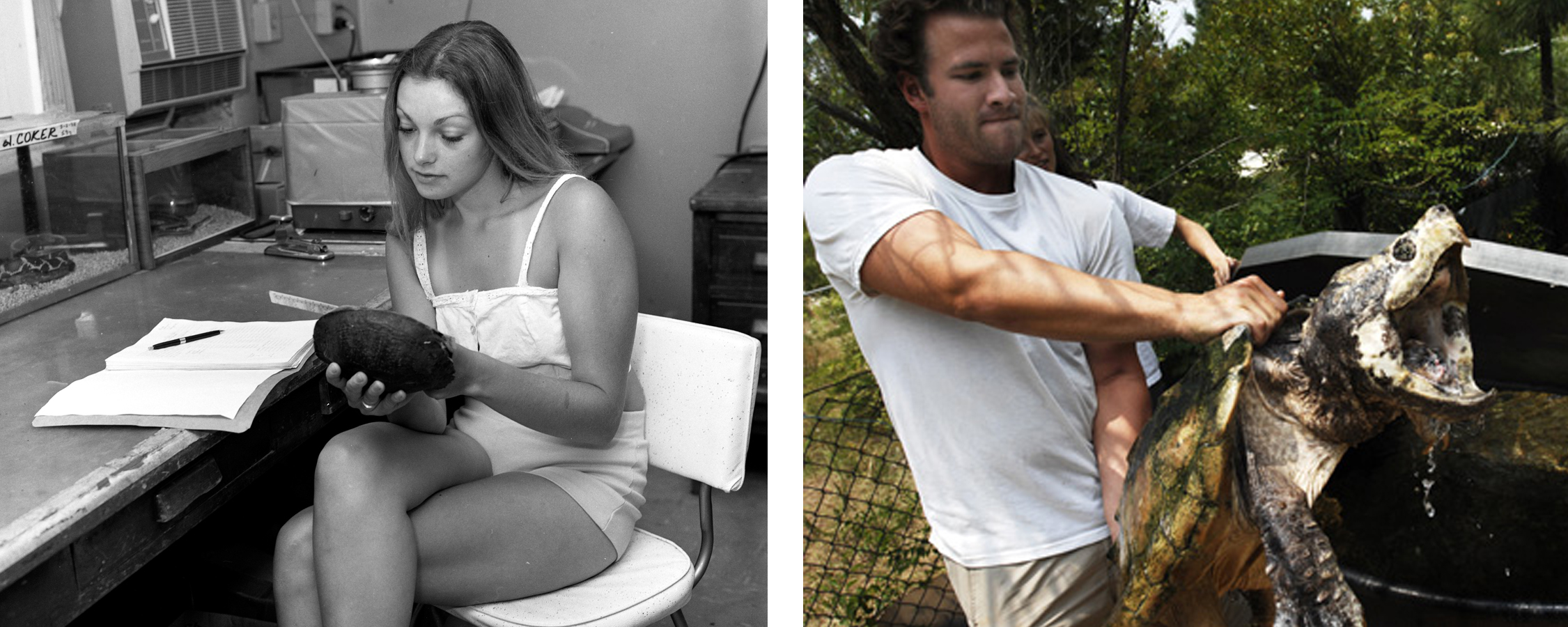
In 1951, researchers were asked to conduct censuses of plants and animals before the nuclear production facilities began operations. A permanent ecology laboratory was established in 1961. Today, it is still operated by the University of Georgia and supported by federal, state, industry and foundation funding to research the long-term ecological impacts.

Biologists from the University of Georgia and the University of South Carolina began ecological studies of local plants and animals in 1951. Eugene Odum from the University of Georgia put forward an ambitious $150,000 (equivalent to $1,900,000 in 2025) proposal that was rejected by the AEC on the grounds of cost and because it wanted to involve both universities. Instead, $10,000 (equivalent to $120,000 in 2025) was given to each university. While the ANSP team focused exclusively on the aquatic ecosystems, the universities carried out terrestrial studies concomitantly. Odum began working on the site in 1951, with three graduate students, each from a different university. The University of South Carolina left after the initial survey work was completed, but the University of Georgia remained, and established the Laboratory of Radiation Ecology at the Savannah River Plant under Robert Allen Norris. In 1961, the AEC established a permanent ecology laboratory on the site, the Savannah River Ecology Laboratory, under Frank Golley. Two Army barracks were converted into laboratory space for the scientists. The site was designated as a National Environmental Research Park in 1972. A large laboratory building was completed in 1979, and in 1997 the Ecology Laboratory Conference Center was opened on the extreme northern edge of the site, near the town of New Ellenton.

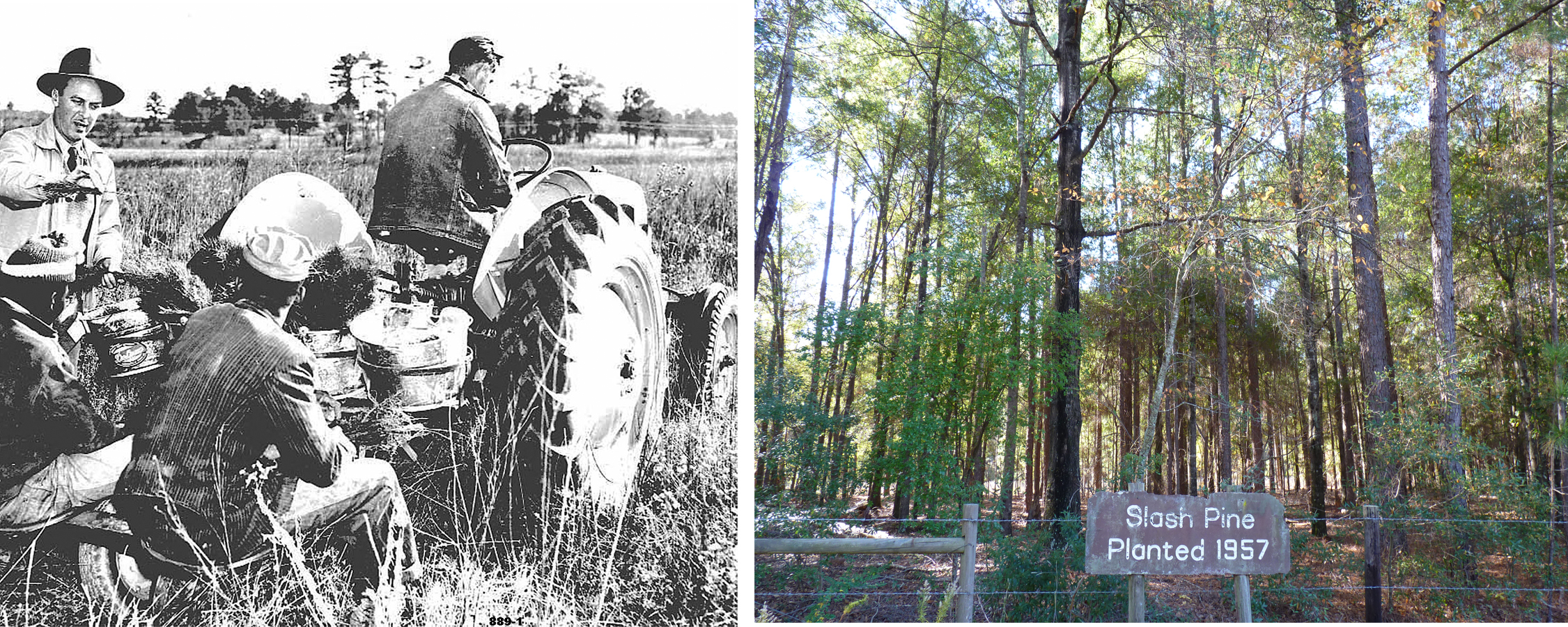
The Savannah River Site is surrounded by a working pine plantation, planted with longleaf, loblolly and slash pine. The U.S. Forest Service was asked to plant trees on the thousands of acres that farmers had used for generations to plant their crops. When the planting process began in 1953, it was the largest mechanized planting program in the United States, with 400,000 trees planted per day during the first two years. The 100 millionth pine seedling was planted in 1968.

In August 1951, the United States Forest Service was brought in to manage and protect the forests that occupied 67 percent of the Savannah River Plant reservation at that time. A large tree planting project was initiated to provide screening, prevent erosion, and control dust and the spread of noxious weeds. Seeds were collected locally, and then sent to the Forest Service's Stuart Forest Nursery in Pollock, Louisiana, established in 1933 in response to the important need for reforestation in West Virginia and eastern Texas. After nine months, they were brought to the Savannah River Plant for planting. Some 75 million seedlings had been planted by June 1960. The timber was later harvested and sold, returning $300,000 (equivalent to $2,500,000 in 2025) in the 1960s and 1970s. By 1999, 72 percent of the site was forest, and the value of the timber was nearly $500 million (equivalent to $1000 million in 2025), with 25 million board feet (59,000 m^{3}) harvested annually for sawlogs, pulpwood and pinestraw.

The Forest Service also maintained wildlife and botany conservation programs. The red-cockaded woodpecker was listed as an endangered species in 1970, but through the efforts of the Forest Service their numbers on site grew from 4 in 1970 to 120 in 2002. Other species being monitored and protected included the bald eagle, wood stork, American alligator, shortnose sturgeon and the smooth purple coneflower. In 1996, the Forest Service established the Savannah River Environmental Sciences Field Station to provide instruction in environmental sciences to university undergraduates.

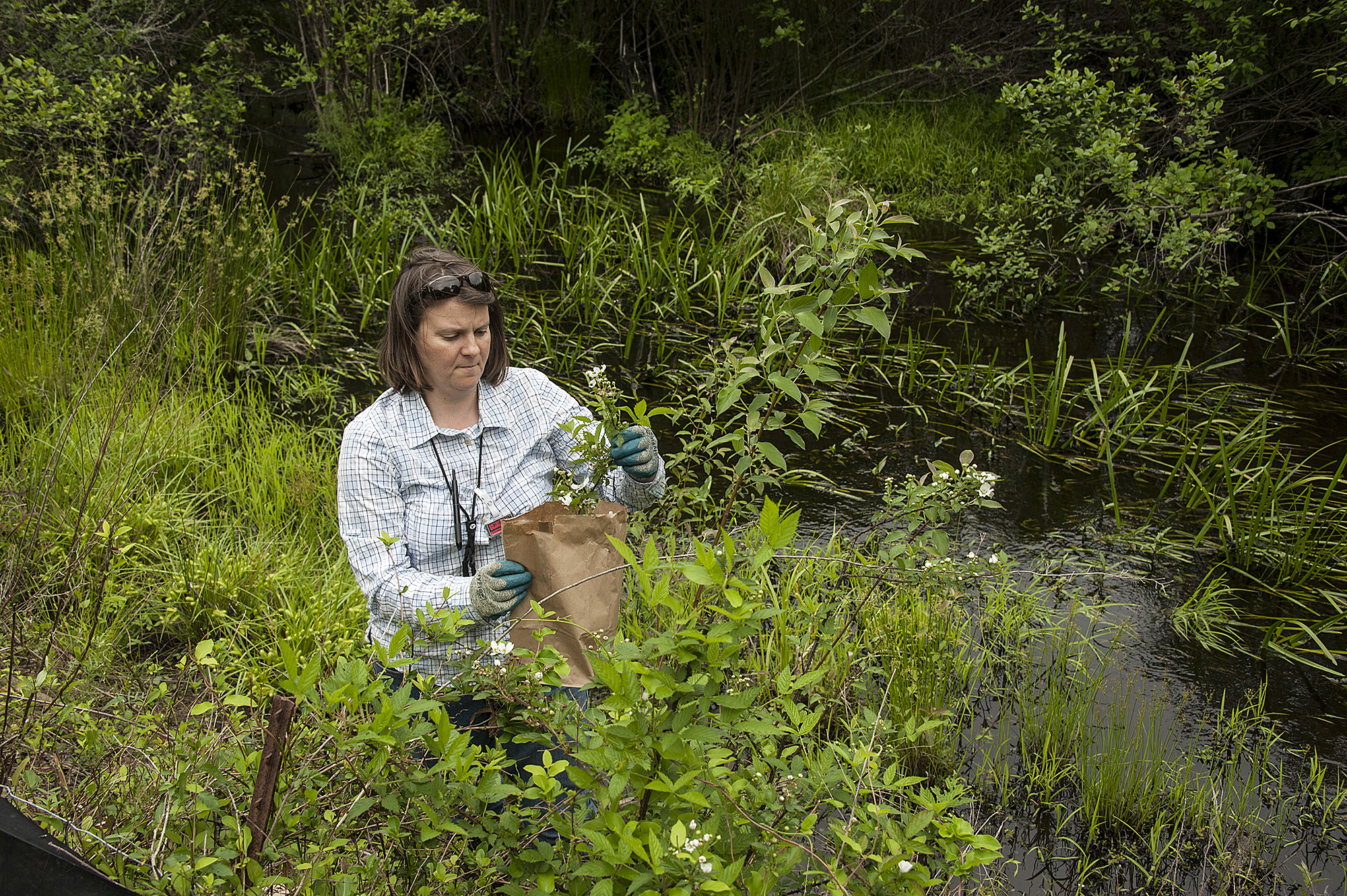
SRNL Senior Scientist Wendy Kuhne collects plant samples along Tinker Creek.

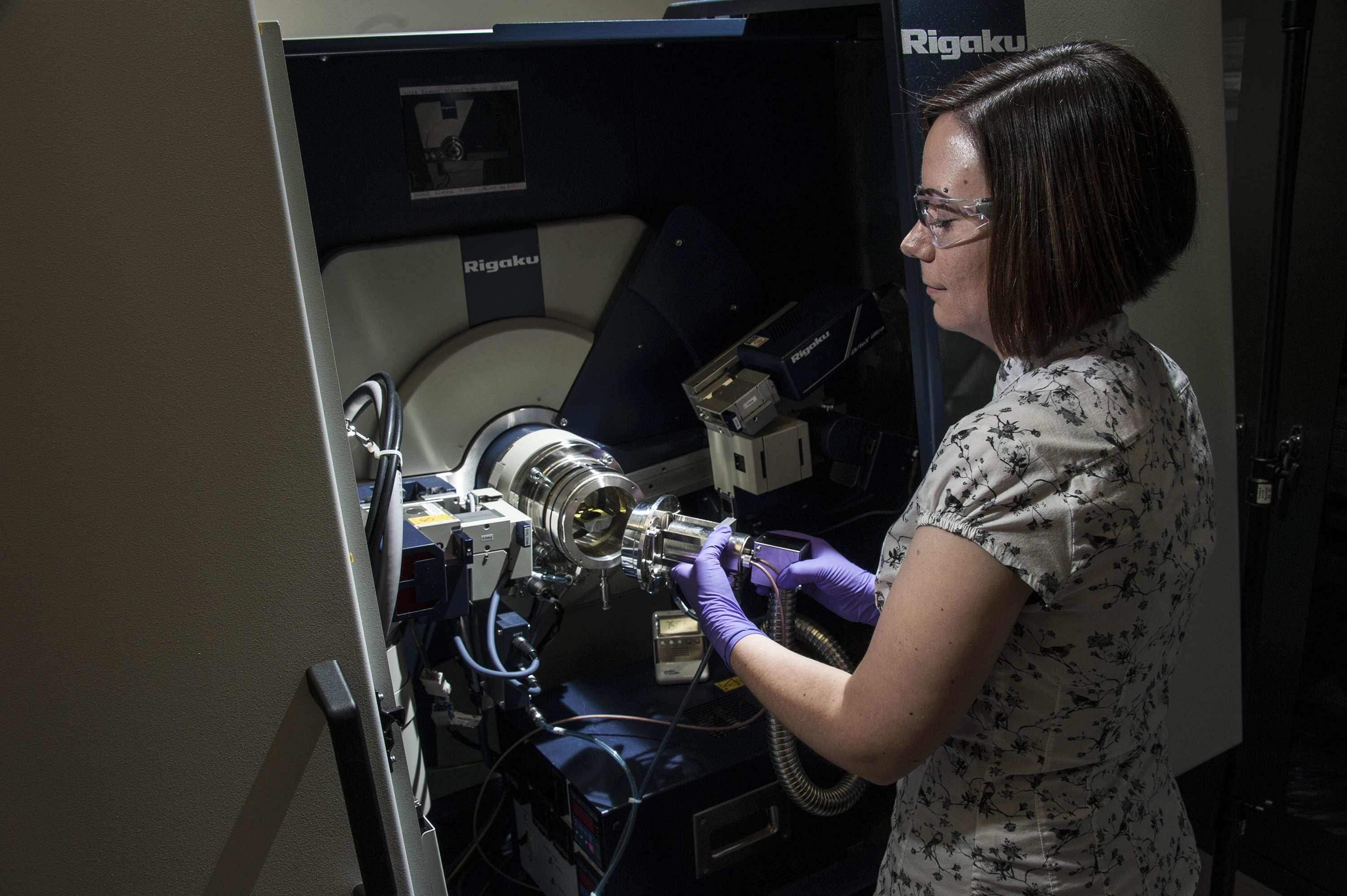
SRNL postdoctoral researcher Maria Kriz works on structural characterization of materials using X-Rays.

In 2007, scientists examining the high-level waste storage tanks were surprised to find a new species of radiation-resistant extremophiles inside one of the tanks. The greenish-orange slime was named Kineococcus radiotolerans. While the high level of radiation inside the tanks would have been lethal to almost any other species, this one had the ability to rebuild its DNA in four to six hours.

Archaeological investigations were initiated on the site in 1973 at the request of the DOE to comply with Executive Order 11593. The South Carolina Institute of Archaeology and Anthropology of the University of South Carolina began conducting archaeology at the Savannah River Plant in 1973 and established a permanent presence on site in 1978 as the Savannah River Archaeological Program, which performed data analysis of prehistoric and historic sites on the land. This resulted in a greater understanding of the site's past in a series of books, journal articles and monographs.

== Sources ==
- Bebbington, William P. (1990). History of Du Pont at the Savannah River Plant. Wilmington, Delaware: E. I. Du Pont De Nemours & Co. ISBN 978-0-934870-27-6. OCLC 24143604.
- Buck, Alice (1983). A History of the Atomic Energy Commission. Washington, D.C.: United States Department of Energy. OCLC 1017233738. Archived from the original on 20 March 2025.
- Carlisle, Rodney P.; Zenzen, Joan M. (2019). Supplying the Nuclear Arsenal: American Production Reactors, 1942–1992. Baltimore, Maryland: Johns Hopkins University Press. ISBN 978-1-4214-3590-9. OCLC 1325858668.
- Department of Energy (February 1996). Plutonium: The First 50 Years: United States Plutonium Production, Acquisition, and Utilization from 1944 through 1994 (Report). Washington, D.C.: Department of Energy. OSTI 219368. DOE/DP-0137. Archived from the original on 27 February 2025.
- Frederickson, Kari (2013). Cold War Dixie: Militarization and Modernization in the American South. Athens, Georgia: University of Georgia Press. ISBN 978-0-8203-4519-2. OCLC 849919737.
- Hewlett, Richard G.; Duncan, Francis (1969). Atomic Shield, 1947–1952 (PDF). A History of the United States Atomic Energy Commission. Vol. II. University Park, Pennsylvania: Pennsylvania State University Press. ISBN 0-520-07187-5. OCLC 3717478. Archived (PDF) from the original on 7 April 2021.
- Gimmy, Kris L. (17 May 2000). "Reactor On-Line Computer Applications". In Reinig, Bill (ed.). 50 Years of Excellence in Science and Engineering at the Savannah River Site (PDF). Savannah River Site, Aiken, South Carolina: Westinghouse Savannah River Company. pp. 67–73. OSTI 754224. Archived (PDF) from the original on 19 August 2024.
- Gorrell, Thomas C. (17 May 2000). "The Restart of L Reactor". In Reinig, Bill (ed.). 50 Years of Excellence in Science and Engineering at the Savannah River Site (PDF). Savannah River Site, Aiken, South Carolina: Westinghouse Savannah River Company. pp. 109–116. OSTI 754224. Archived (PDF) from the original on 19 August 2024.
- Groh, Harold J.; Poe, W. Lee; Porter, John A. (17 May 2000). "Development and Performance of Processes and Equipment to Recover Neptunium-237 and Plutonium-238". In Reinig, Bill (ed.). 50 Years of Excellence in Science and Engineering at the Savannah River Site (PDF). Savannah River Site, Aiken, South Carolina: Westinghouse Savannah River Company. pp. 165–176. OSTI 754224. Archived (PDF) from the original on 19 August 2024.
- Hewlett, Richard G.; Holl, Jack M. (1989). Atoms for Peace and War, 1953–1961 Eisenhower and the Atomic Energy Commission. A History of the United States Atomic Energy Commission. Vol. III. University Park, Pennsylvania: Pennsylvania State University Press. ISBN 0-520-06018-0. OCLC 82275622.
- History Associates Incorporated (September 1987). History of the Production Complex: The Methods of Site Selection (Report). Rockville, Maryland. OSTI 5745137.
- Holl, Jack M.; Hewlett, Richard G.; Harris, Ruth Roy (1997). Argonne National Laboratory, 1946–96. Urbana, Illinois: University of Illinois Press. ISBN 978-0-252-02341-5. OCLC 36074441.
- International Atomic Energy Agency (2002). Heavy Water Reactors: Status and Projected Development (PDF). Vienna: International Atomic Energy Agency. ISBN 978-92-0-111502-7. OCLC 50546918. Archived (PDF) from the original on 10 February 2025.
- Joseph, J. Walter; Banick, Cy J. (17 May 2000). "The Genesis of the Savannah River Site: Key Decisions, 1950". In Reinig, Bill (ed.). 50 Years of Excellence in Science and Engineering at the Savannah River Site (PDF). Savannah River Site, Aiken, South Carolina: Westinghouse Savannah River Company. pp. 1–10. OSTI 754224. Archived (PDF) from the original on 19 August 2024.
- Kohn, Stephen M. (2023). Rules for Whistleblowers: A Handbook for Doing What's Right. Blue Ridge Summit: The Globe Pequot Press. ISBN 978-1-4930-7280-4. OCLC 1378936700.
- Rankin, D. Thomas; Kanne, William R. Jr.; Louthan, McIntyre R. Jr; Bickford, Dennis F.; Congdon, James W. (17 May 2000). "Production of Pu-238 Oxide Fuel for Space Exploration". In Reinig, Bill (ed.). 50 Years of Excellence in Science and Engineering at the Savannah River Site (PDF). Savannah River Site, Aiken, South Carolina: Westinghouse Savannah River Company. pp. 179–186. OSTI 754224. Archived (PDF) from the original on 19 August 2024.
- Reed, Mary Beth; Swanson, Mark T.; Gaither, Steven; Joseph, J. W.; Henry, William R. (2002). Strack, Barbara Smith (ed.). Savannah River Site at Fifty (PDF). Washington, D.C.: Department of Energy. ISBN 978-0-16-067182-1. OCLC 50648911. Archived (PDF) from the original on 24 May 2025.
- Reed, Mary Beth; Swanson, Mark T. (27 November 2006). 300/M Area – Fuel and Target Fabrication (PDF) (Report). Savannah River Site Cold War Historic Property Documentation. Stone Mountain, Georgia: New South Associates. Technical Report 1189. Archived (PDF) from the original on 21 January 2022.
- Reed, Mary Beth; Swanson, Mark T. (14 March 2008). 400/D Area – Heavy Water Production (PDF) (Report). Savannah River Site Cold War Historic Property Documentation. Stone Mountain, Georgia: New South Associates. Technical Report 1568. Archived (PDF) from the original on 21 January 2022.
- Reed, Mary Beth (24 March 2010). Reactor on – Thematic Study of Savannah River's Five Reactor Area (PDF) (Report). Savannah River Site Cold War Historic Property Documentation. Stone Mountain, Georgia: New South Associates. Technical Report 1743. Archived (PDF) from the original on 4 November 2023.
- Reed, Mary Beth; Swanson, Mark T.; Olson, Christina (30 September 2010). You Can't Run a Reactor If You Can't Get to It – Thematic Study of Savannah River Site's Infrastructure (PDF) (Report). Savannah River Site Cold War Historic Property Documentation. Stone Mountain, Georgia: New South Associates. Technical Report 1793. Archived (PDF) from the original on 5 October 2022.
- Reed, Mary Beth; Swanson, Mark T.; Tyson, Jackie; DeLoach Gillett, Terri (29 July 2013). Bringing It to Form – A Thematic Study of Savannah River Site's Separations Processes, F and H Areas (PDF) (Report). Savannah River Site Cold War Historic Property Documentation. Stone Mountain, Georgia: New South Associates. Technical Report 2202. Archived from the original (PDF) on 1 July 2022.
- Savannah River Archaeological Research Program (2003). 25 Years of Discovering the Past: The Savannah River Research Program: A Silver Anniversary Retrospective 1978–2003 (PDF). Columbia, South Carolina: University of South Carolina. OCLC 665067165. Archived (PDF) from the original on 3 July 2024.
- Schwartz, Stephen I. (1998). Atomic Audit: The Costs and Consequences of U. S. Nuclear Weapons Since 1940. Washington, D.C.: Brookings Institution Press. ISBN 978-0-8157-7774-8. OCLC 39093551.
- Waltham, Chris (20 June 2002). An Early History of Heavy Water. Department of Physics and Astronomy, University of British Columbia. arXiv:physics/0206076.
