= Judo at the 1988 Summer Olympics – Men's 60 kg =

Judo at the Olympics

Men's 60 kg at the Games of the XXIV Olympiad
- Venue: Jangchung Gymnasium
- Date: 25 September 1988
- Competitors: 36 from 36 nations

Medalists
1st place, gold medalist(s)		Kim Jae-yup	South Korea
2nd place, silver medalist(s)		Kevin Asano	United States
3rd place, bronze medalist(s)		Shinji Hosokawa	Japan
3rd place, bronze medalist(s)		Amiran Totikashvili	Soviet Union

The men's 60 kg competition in judo at the 1988 Summer Olympics in Seoul was held on 25 September at the Jangchung Gymnasium. The gold medal was won by Kim Jae-yup of South Korea.

== Results ==
=== Pool A ===
Round of 64
Kim Jae-yup (KOR)	IPO
Mohamed Madhar (SUR)	R
Alberto Francini (SMR)	WIP
Mohamed Kohsrof (YAR)	E
József Csák (HUN)	WAZ
Marino Cattedra (ITA)	E

Round of 32
Kim Jae-yup (KOR)	KOK
Amiran Totikashvili (URS)	R
Sérgio Pessoa (BRA)	IPO
Gilles Pages (MON)	E
Alberto Francini (SMR)	E
Guno Berenstein (NED)	IPO
Ireneusz Kiejda (POL)	E
Helmut Dietz (FRG)	KEI
József Csák (HUN)	KOK
Haldun Efemgil (TUR)	E
Phil Takahashi (CAN)	E
Ali Idir (ALG)	IPO
Pavel Botev (BUL)	IPO
Mikhalakis Skouroumounis (CYP)	E
Emad El-Din Hassan (EGY)	E
Patrick Roux (FRA)	YUS

Round of 16
Kim Jae-yup (KOR)	YUS
Sérgio Pessoa (BRA)	R
Guno Berenstein (NED)	E
Helmut Dietz (FRG)	KEI
József Csák (HUN)	KOK
Ali Idir (ALG)	E
Pavel Botev (BUL)	E
Patrick Roux (FRA)	KOK

Quarterfinal
Kim Jae-yup (KOR)	IPO
Helmut Dietz (FRG)	R
József Csák (HUN)	E
Patrick Roux (FRA)	IPO

Semifinal
Kim Jae-yup (KOR)	KOK
Patrick Roux (FRA)	R

=== Pool B ===
Round of 64
Jerry Dino (PHI)	E
Zhang Guojun (CHN)	IPO
Luis Martínez (PUR)	E
Neil Eckersley (GBR)	IPO

Round of 32
Zhang Guojun (CHN)	YUS
Badrakhyn Nyamjav (MGL)	E
Renato Santos (POR)	KIK
Carlos Sotillo (ESP)	E
Salvador Hernández (MEX)	WO
Michel Nakouze (LIB)	DNS
Shinji Hosokawa (JPN)	IPO
Abbão Bartolomeu (ANG)	E
Neil Eckersley (GBR)	IPO
Daniel Brunhart (LIE)	E
Sheu Tsay-chwan (TPE)	IPO
Ricardo Belmonte (BOL)	E
Gilberto García (DOM)	E
Lee Kan (HKG)	IPO
Kevin Asano (USA)	KOK
Petr Šedivák (TCH)	R

Round of 16
Zhang Guojun (CHN)	YUS
Renato Santos (POR)	E
Salvador Hernández (MEX)	E
Shinji Hosokawa (JPN)	IPO
Neil Eckersley (GBR)	E
Sheu Tsay-chwan (TPE)	IPO
Lee Kan (HKG)	R
Kevin Asano (USA)	IPO

Quarterfinal
Zhang Guojun (CHN)	E
Shinji Hosokawa (JPN)	IPO
Sheu Tsay-chwan (TPE)	R
Kevin Asano (USA)	IPO

Semifinal
Shinji Hosokawa (JPN)	R
Kevin Asano (USA)	YUS

=== Repechages ===
Repechage
Mohamed Madhar (SUR)	E
Amiran Totikashvili (URS)	IPO

Repechage quarterfinal
Amiran Totikashvili (URS)	IPO
Sérgio Pessoa (BRA)	E

Repechage semifinal
Amiran Totikashvili (URS)	YUK
Helmut Dietz (FRG)	E

Repechage final
Amiran Totikashvili (URS)	YUK (bronze)
Patrick Roux (FRA)	E

Repechage

Repechage quarterfinal
Petr Šedivák (TCH)	IPO
Lee Kan (HKG)	E

Repechage semifinal
Petr Šedivák (TCH)	E
Sheu Tsay-chwan (TPE)	YUS

Repechage final
Sheu Tsay-chwan (TPE)	E
Shinji Hosokawa (JPN)	IPO (bronze)

=== Final ===
Final
Kim Jae-yup (KOR)	SHI (gold)
Kevin Asano (USA)	2nd place, silver medalist(s)

== Final classification ==
Rank	Judoka	Nation
1st place, gold medalist(s)	Kim Jae-yup	South Korea
2nd place, silver medalist(s)	Kevin Asano	United States
3rd place, bronze medalist(s)	Shinji Hosokawa	Japan
3rd place, bronze medalist(s)	Amiran Totikashvili	Soviet Union
5T	Patrick Roux	France
5T	Sheu Tsay-chwan	Chinese Taipei
7T	Petr Šedivák	Czechoslovakia
7T	Helmut Dietz	West Germany
9T	Sérgio Pessoa	Brazil
9T	Lee Kan	Hong Kong
11	Mohamed Madhar	Suriname
12T	József Csák	Hungary
12T	Zhang Guojun	China
14T	Guno Berenstein	Netherlands
14T	Ali Idir	Algeria
14T	Pavel Botev	Bulgaria
14T	Renato Santos	Portugal
14T	Salvador Hernández	Mexico
14T	Neil Eckersley	Great Britain
20T	Gilberto García	Dominican Republic
20T	Luis Martínez	Puerto Rico
20T	Gilles Pages	Monaco
20T	Alberto Francini	San Marino
20T	Ireneusz Kiejda	Poland
20T	Haldun Efemgil	Turkey
20T	Phil Takahashi	Canada
20T	Mikhalakis Skouroumounis	Cyprus
20T	Emad El-Din Hassan	Egypt
20T	Badrakhyn Nyamjav	Mongolia
20T	Carlos Sotillo	Spain
20T	Abbão Bartolomeu	Angola
20T	Daniel Brunhart	Liechtenstein
20T	Ricardo Belmonte	Bolivia
34T	Mohamed Kohsrof	North Yemen
34T	Marino Cattedra	Italy
34T	Jerry Dino	Philippines
