= Suriname at the 1984 Summer Olympics =

- IOC code: SUR
- NOC: Suriname Olympic Committee

in Los Angeles
- Competitors: 5 (all men) in 3 sports
- Flag bearer: Siegfried Cruden
- Medals: Gold 0 Silver 0 Bronze 0 Total 0

Summer Olympics appearances (overview)
- 1960; 1964; 1968; 1972; 1976; 1980; 1984; 1988; 1992; 1996; 2000; 2004; 2008; 2012; 2016; 2020; 2024

Suriname competed at the 1984 Summer Olympics in Los Angeles, United States, from 28 July to 12 August 1984. It was the nation's fifth appearance at the Summer Olympics, since its debut at the 1960 Summer Olympics in Rome. Suriname returned to the Olympics having boycotted the 1980 Summer Olympics in Moscow. The Suriname delegation consisted of five athletes (all men) competing in three sports.

== Background ==
The Suriname Olympic Committee was founded in 1956 and was recognized by the International Olympic Committee (IOC) in 1959. The nation made its Olympic debut at the 1960 Summer Olympics in Rome, and has competed in every Summer Olympics since then except in 1964 and 1980. The 1984 Summer Olympics marked the country's fifth appearance at the Summer Olympics. Suriname returned to the Olympics having boycotted the previous 1980 Summer Olympics in Moscow.

The 1984 Summer Olympics were held in Los Angeles, United States, from 28 July to 12 August 1984. Sprinter Siegfried Cruden was the flagbearer for Suriname during the opening ceremony. Suriname did not win any medal at the Games.

== Competitors ==
The Suriname delegation consisted of six athletes (four men and two women) competing in four sports.

Sport	Men	Women	Total
Athletics	2	0	2
Judo	1	0	1
Swimming	2	0	2
Total	5	0	5

== Athletics ==
Suriname entered two athletes for the athletics competitions at the 1984 Summer Olympics– Siegfried Cruden competed in the men's 400 metres and 800 metres, and Tito Rodrigues in the men's 1,500 metres. Both Cruden and Rodrigues were competing in their first and only Summer Olympics.

The athletics events were held at the Los Angeles Memorial Coliseum. In the men's 400 metres preliminary heats held on 4 August, Cruden finished seventh with a time of 50.07 seconds and did not advance further. In the 800 metres race, he clocked a time of 1:53.31 in the fifth heat, and finished eighth and last. He did not make it to further rounds. In the men's 1500 metres event, Rodrigues set a time of 4:02.87 and finished tenth in the fourth heat to not advance further.

Athlete	Event	Heat		Semifinal		Final	
Athlete	Event	Result	Rank	Result	Rank	Result	Rank
Siegfried Cruden	Men's 400 m	50.07	7	Did not advance			
Siegfried Cruden	Men's 800 m	1:53.31	8	Did not advance			
Tito Rodrigues	Men's 1500 m	4:02.87	10	Did not advance			

== Judo ==
Suriname entered one judoka, Mohamed Madhar, who competed in the men's extra-lightweight (–60 kg) event. Madhar was born on 28 October 1962 and was making his Olympic debut. He was the third ever judoka to represent Suriname at the Olympics, and would go on to compete in the 1988 Summer Olympics.

The judo events were held at the Eagle's Nest Arena in Los Angeles. In the round of 32 match, against Christian Nkamgang of Cameroon, Madhar won by an ippon. In the round of 16, he was defeated by Peter Jupke by an ippon and finished joint 12th overall.

Athlete	Event	Preliminary	Round of 32	Round of 16	Quarterfinals	Semifinals	Repechage 1	Repechage 2	Repechage 3	Final / BM	
Athlete	Event	Opposition Result	Opposition Result	Opposition Result	Opposition Result	Opposition Result	Opposition Result	Opposition Result	Opposition Result	Opposition Result	Rank
Mohamed Madhar	Men's −60 kg	—N/a	Christian Nkamgang (CMR); W 0010-0000	Peter Jupke (FRG); L 0000-1000	Did not advance						

== Swimming ==
Suriname entered two swimmers, Anthony Nesty, who competed in the men's 100 m freestyle and 100 m butterfly events, and Hugo Goossen in the men's 100 m backstroke. Nesty was born on 25 November 1967 in Trinidad and his family moved to Suriname when he was seven months old. He began swimming at the age of five. After attending the Bolles School in Jacksonville, Florida, he enrolled at the University of Florida. He made his debut for Suriname at the 1984 Summer Olympics. After the Games, he won gold in the event at the 1987 Pan American Games and the 1988 Summer Olympics. This was the first and only Olympic appearance for Goossen.

The swimming events were held at the Olympic Swim Stadium at the University of Southern California. In the men's 100 metres backstroke, held on 3 August 1984, Goossen finished fifth in the second heat, placing 36th out of the 45 competitors, and did not advance further. In the 100 metres butterfly, Nesty clocked 56.15 seconds in the third heat to finish third. He was classified 21st amongst the 53 participants, and did not make it to further rounds. In the 100 metres freestyle held on 31 July, he set a time of 54.99 seconds to place sixth in the sixth heat. He was classified 49th overall amongst the 68 swimmers, and failed to make it further.

Athlete	Event	Heat		Final B		Final	
Athlete	Event	Time	Rank	Time	Rank	Time	Rank
Hugo Goossen	Men's 100 m backstroke	1:03.77	36	Did not advance			
Anthony Nesty	Men's 100 m freestyle	54.99	49	Did not advance			
Anthony Nesty	Men's 100 m butterfly	56.15	21	Did not advance			
