= Renato Santos =

Renato Santos may refer to:

- Renato Santos (footballer, born 1987), Brazilian footballer
- Renato Santos (footballer, born 1991), Portuguese footballer
- Renato Dias Santos (born 1987), Brazilian striker
- Renato Santos (judoka) (born 1964), Portuguese judoka
