= Judo at the 1984 Summer Olympics – Men's 60 kg =

Judo competition

Men's 60 kg at the Games of the XXIII Olympiad
- Venue: California State University, Los Angeles
- Date: 4 August 1984
- Competitors: 27 from 27 nations

Medalists
| 1st place, gold medalist(s) | | Shinji Hosokawa | Japan |
| 2nd place, silver medalist(s) | | Kim Jae-yup | South Korea |
| 3rd place, bronze medalist(s) | | Neil Eckersley | Great Britain |
| 3rd place, bronze medalist(s) | | Edward Liddie | United States |

The men's 60 kg competition in judo at the 1984 Summer Olympics in Los Angeles was held on 4 August at the California State University. The gold medal was won by Shinji Hosokawa of Japan.

== Results ==
=== Pool A ===
Round of 32
Gino Ciampa (AUS) | 1:35
James Mafuta (ZAM) | E
Zhang Guojun (CHN) | E
Guy Delvingt (FRA) | 5:00
Carlos Sotillo (ESP) | 5:00
Alberto Francini (SMR) | E
Mohamed Madhar (SUR) | 5:00
Christian Nkamgang (CMR) | E
Djibril Sall (SEN) | E
Peter Jupke (FRG) | 4:14
Jorge di Noco (ARG) | 1:02
Yeung Luen Lin (HKG) | E

Round of 16
Gino Ciampa (AUS) | E
Guy Delvingt (FRA) | 5:00
Carlos Sotillo (ESP) | R
Kim Jae-yup (KOR) | 5:00
Mohamed Madhar (SUR) | E
Peter Jupke (FRG) | 0:24
Jorge di Noco (ARG) | E
Edward Liddie (USA) | 3:29

Quarterfinal
Guy Delvingt (FRA) | R
Kim Jae-yup (KOR) | 5:00
Peter Jupke (FRG) | E
Edward Liddie (USA) | 5:00

Semifinal
Kim Jae-yup (KOR) | 5:00
Edward Liddie (USA) | R

=== Pool B ===
Round of 32
Cengiz Guler (TUR) | DNS
Chau Chin-fu (TPE) | WO
Ronny Sanabria (CRC) | E
Eddy Koaz (ISR) | 0:14
Neil Eckersley (GBR) | 4:27
Anders Hellqvist (SWE) | E
João Neves (POR) | R
Shinji Hosokawa (JPN) | 1:56
Phil Takahashi (CAN) | E
Luiz Shinohara (BRA) | 5:00
Abdel Hamid Slimani (MAR) | 3:20
Michel Estephan (LIB) | E

Round of 16
Chau Chin-fu (TPE) | E
Eddy Koaz (ISR) | 3:04
Neil Eckersley (GBR) | 5:00
Rafael González (MEX) | E
Shinji Hosokawa (JPN) | 2:58
Luiz Shinohara (BRA) | R
Abdel Hamid Slimani (MAR) | E
Felice Mariani (ITA) | 5:00

Quarterfinal
Eddy Koaz (ISR) | E
Neil Eckersley (GBR) | 4:24
Shinji Hosokawa (JPN) | 5:00
Felice Mariani (ITA) | R

Semifinal
Neil Eckersley (GBR) | R
Shinji Hosokawa (JPN) | 0:51

=== Repechages ===
| Repechage | Repechage semifinal | | Repechage final |
| | Carlos Sotillo (ESP) | E |
| | Guy Delvingt (FRA) | 5:00 |
| | | | Guy Delvingt (FRA) | E |
| | | | Edward Liddie (USA) | 7:00 (bronze) |

| Repechage | | Repechage semifinal | | Repechage final |
| João Neves (POR) | DNS |
| Luiz Shinohara (BRA) | WO | Luiz Shinohara (BRA) | E |
| | | Felice Mariani (ITA) | 5:00 |
| | | | | Felice Mariani (ITA) | E |
| | | | | Neil Eckersley (GBR) | 2:09 (bronze) |

=== Final ===
| Final |
| Kim Jae-yup (KOR) | 2nd place, silver medalist(s) |
| Shinji Hosokawa (JPN) | 1:09 (gold) |

== Final classification ==
| Rank | Judoka | Nation |
|---|---|---|
| 1st place, gold medalist(s) | Shinji Hosokawa | Japan |
| 2nd place, silver medalist(s) | Kim Jae-yup | South Korea |
| 3rd place, bronze medalist(s) | Neil Eckersley | Great Britain |
| 3rd place, bronze medalist(s) | Edward Liddie | United States |
| 5 | Guy Delvingt | France |
| 5 | Felice Mariani | Italy |
| 7 | Luiz Shinohara | Brazil |
| 7 | Carlos Sotillo | Spain |
| 9 | João Neves | Portugal |
| 10 | Peter Jupke | West Germany |
| 10 | Eddy Koaz | Israel |
| 12 | Gino Ciampa | Australia |
| 12 | Abdel Hamid Slimani | Morocco |
| 12 | Mohamed Madhar | Suriname |
| 12 | Jorge di Noco | Argentina |
| 12 | Chau Chin-fu | Chinese Taipei |
| 12 | Rafael González | Mexico |
| 18 | James Mafuta | Zambia |
| 18 | Zhang Guojun | China |
| 18 | Alberto Francini | San Marino |
| 18 | Christian Nkamgang | Cameroon |
| 18 | Djibril Sall | Senegal |
| 18 | Yeung Luen Lin | Hong Kong |
| 18 | Ronny Sanabria | Costa Rica |
| 18 | Anders Hellqvist | Sweden |
| 18 | Michel Estephan | Lebanon |
| 18 | Phil Takahashi | Canada |
