= Botev =

Botev (Bulgarian: Ботев) may refer to:

== Places ==
- Botevgrad, a town in Bulgaria
- Botev Peak, the highest peak of the Balkan mountains
- Botev Point

== Sports ==
- FC Botev Galabovo, a football club from Galabovo, Bulgaria
- OFC Botev Ihtiman, a football club from Ihtiman, Bulgaria
- FC Botev Krivodol, a football club from Krivodol, Bulgaria
- FC Botev Lukovit, a football club from Lukovit, Bulgaria
- FC Botev Novi Pazar, a football club from Novi Pazar, Bulgaria
- PFC Botev Plovdiv, a football club from Plovdiv, Bulgaria
- POFC Botev Vratsa, a football club from Vratsa

== Other uses ==
- Botev (surname)
- Hristo Botev Stadium (disambiguation)
