= Ciampa =

Ciampa may refer to:

== People with the surname ==
- Emilius R. Ciampa (1896–1996), American sculptor born in Italy
- Gian Marco Ciampa (born 1990), Italian classical and electric guitarist
- Gino Ciampa (born 1962), Australian judoka
- John Ciampa (1922–1984), Italian-American stuntman
- Letizia Ciampa (born 1986), Italian voice actress
- Tommaso Ciampa (born 1985), American professional wrestler

== Biology ==
- Ciampa (moth), a genus of moths in the family Geometridae
