= Kevin Asano =

American Olympic judoka

Personal information
- Full name: Kevin Yoshimi Asano
- Born: April 20, 1963 (age 63) Hawaii, U.S.
- Occupation: Judoka
- Website: kevinasano.com

Sport
- Country: United States
- Sport: Judo
- Weight class: ‍–‍60 kg

Achievements and titles
- Olympic Games: (silver) (1988)
- World Champ.: (bronze) (1987)
- Pan American Champ.: (1984)
Medal record
Men's judo
Representing United States
Olympic Games
Silver medal – second place	1988 Seoul	‍–‍60 kg
World Championships
Bronze medal – third place	1987 Essen	‍–‍60 kg
Pan American Games
Silver medal – second place	1987 Indianapolis	‍–‍60 kg
Pan American Championships
Bronze medal – third place	1984 Mexico CIty	‍–‍60 kg

Profile at external databases
- IJF: 53658
- JudoInside.com: 5995
- Updated on June 6, 2023

Kevin Yoshimi Asano (born April 20, 1963) is a retired judoka from the United States, who won the silver medal in the men's extra-lightweight competition at the 1988 Summer Olympics. On his way to capturing the medal he beat Shinji Hosokawa, who was the reigning world champion and 1984 Gold Medalist. Asano came close to winning the gold medal, but lost it on a one-point penalty to Kim Jae-Yup of South Korea.

== Personal life ==
Asano was born in Hawaii. He graduated from Pearl City High School in Hawaii in 1981, studied Japanese and trained in judo at Tokai University for two years, then went on to study at San José State University where he graduated in 1989 in accounting. In 2008, Kevin Asano's autobiography, Step Onto the Mat: Journey to True Success, was published by White Mountain Castle Publishing. He co-founded Pacific Rim Legacy Group, a financial planning organization and Personal Transformation International, a 501(c)3 organization. He has served as President of Hawaii Judo, Inc., the state judo governing body of USA Judo and President of the United States Judo Federation, a grassroots national judo organization. He is also the head instructor of Leeward Judo Club in Hawaii.

== Awards and honors ==
USA Judo announced Kevin Asano among its inaugural Hall of Fame inductees in 2008 along with Edward Liddie, Mike Swain and Jimmy Pedro. He is also a member of the Hawaii Sports Hall of Fame 2000 inductees is also a member of the San Jose State University Sports Hall of Fame. In 1988, Asano was named the US Olympic Committee's US Judo Athlete of the Year.

== Books authored ==
Asano has authored the following book:

- Step Onto the Mat (White Mountain Castle Publishing, LLC, 2008) ISBN 978-0-9815219-1-6
