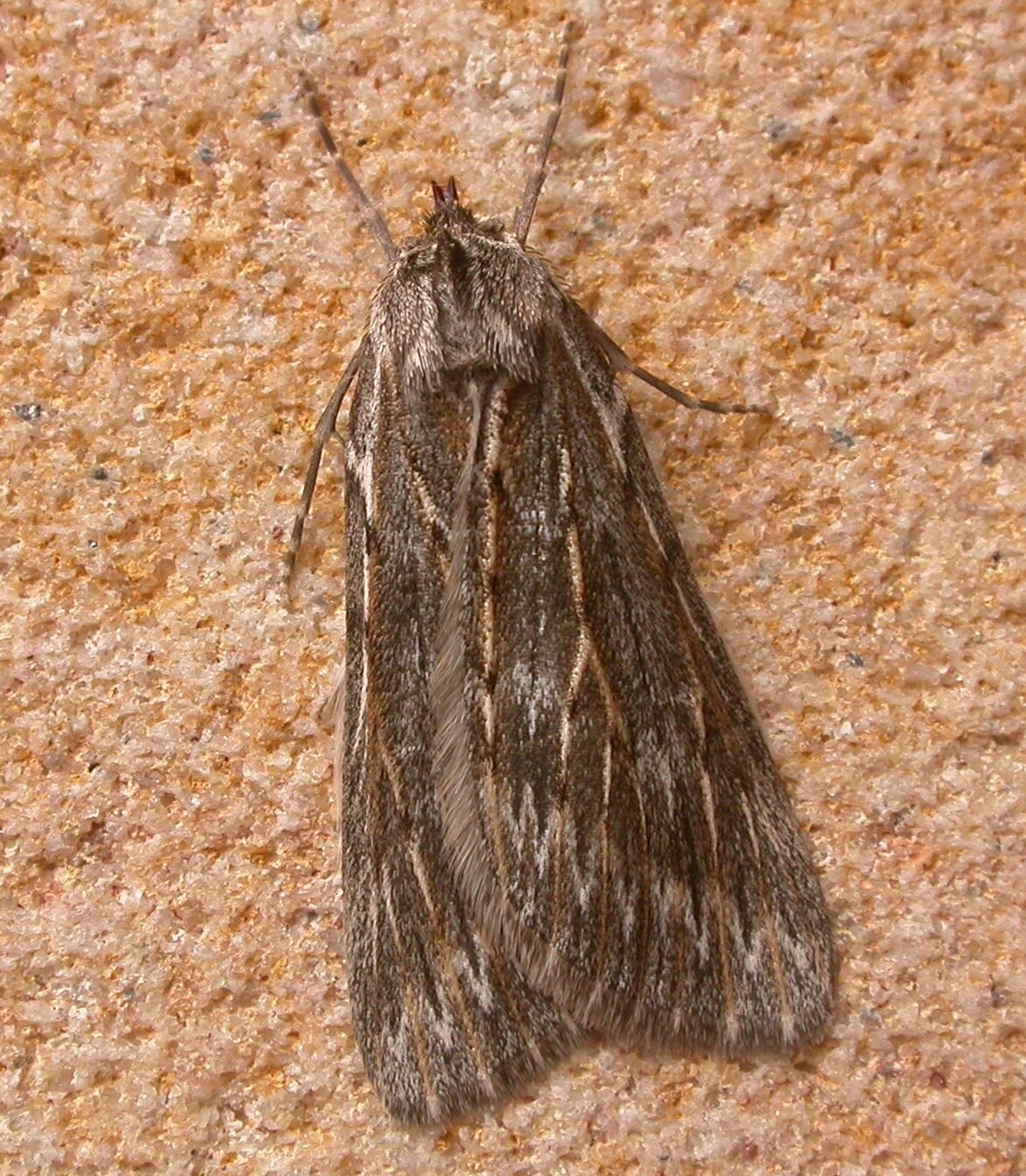

Scientific classification
- Domain: Eukaryota
- Kingdom: Animalia
- Phylum: Arthropoda
- Class: Insecta
- Order: Lepidoptera
- Family: Geometridae
- Genus: Ciampa
- Species: C. arietaria

Binomial name
- Ciampa arietaria (Guenée, 1857)

Synonyms
- Chlenias arietaria Guenée, 1857; Chemerina cuneifera Walker, 1862; Ciampa defixella Walker, 1863; Hypata moderatella Walker, 1869; Chlenias crambaria Felder & Rogenhofer, 1875; Ciampa stenoptila Turner, 1947

= Ciampa arietaria =

Species of moth

Ciampa arietaria, the brown pasture looper, is a moth of the family Geometridae. It is found in most of Australia, including Tasmania.

The wingspan is about 40 mm.

The larvae feed on various herbaceous plants, including Arctotheca calendula, Onopordum acaulon, Lupinus nanus, Medicago sativa, Erodium species and Zaluzianskya divaricata. They are considered a pest on pastures.
