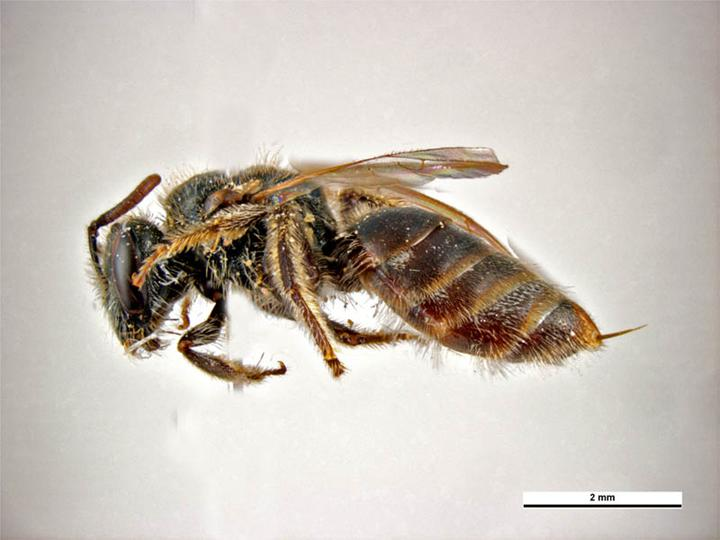
- Female

Scientific classification
- Kingdom: Animalia
- Phylum: Arthropoda
- Clade: Pancrustacea
- Class: Insecta
- Order: Hymenoptera
- Family: Halictidae
- Genus: Lasioglossum
- Species: L. globosum

Binomial name
- Lasioglossum globosum Smith, 1853

Synonyms
- Halictus globosus Smith, 1853

= Lasioglossum globosum =

Species of bee

Lasioglossum globosum, or Lasioglossum (Chilalictus) globosum, is a species of bee in the family Halictidae and subfamily Halictinae. It is endemic to Australia. It was described by English entomologist Frederick Smith in 1853.

== Distribution and habitat ==
The species occurs in south-eastern Australia.

== Behaviour ==
The adults are flying mellivores. Flowering plants visited by the bees include Arctotheca, Calytrix, Carpobrotus, Craspedia, Daviesia, Eucalyptus, Medicago, Oxalis, Pultenaea, Senecio and Veronica species.

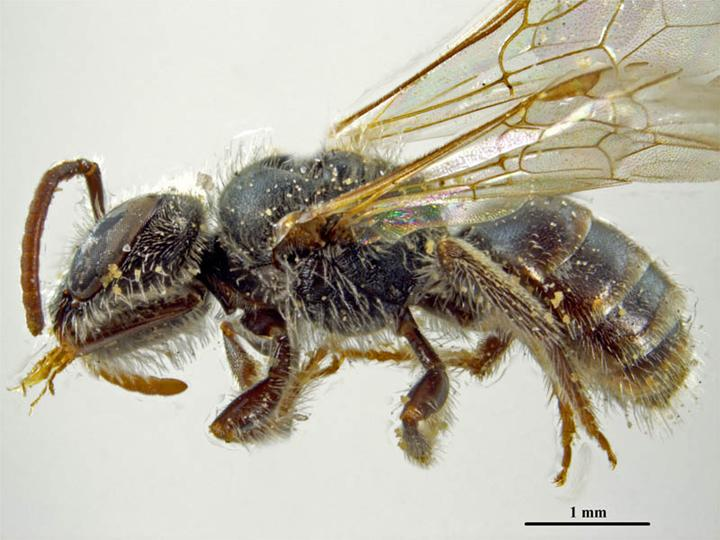
Male
