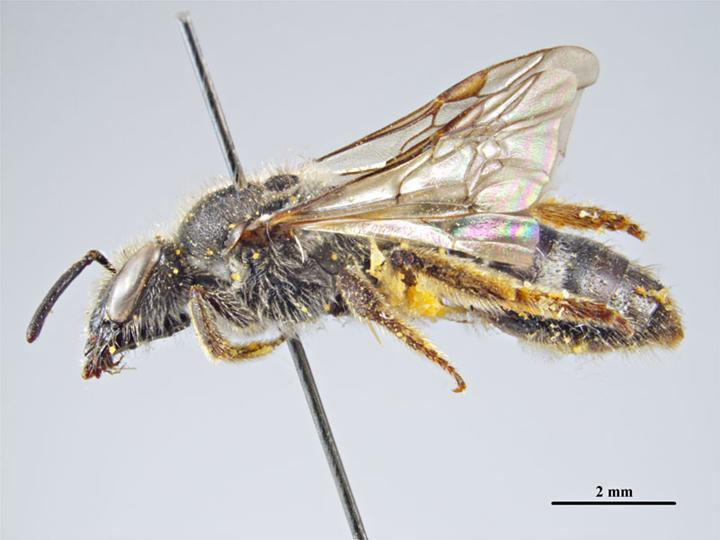
- Female
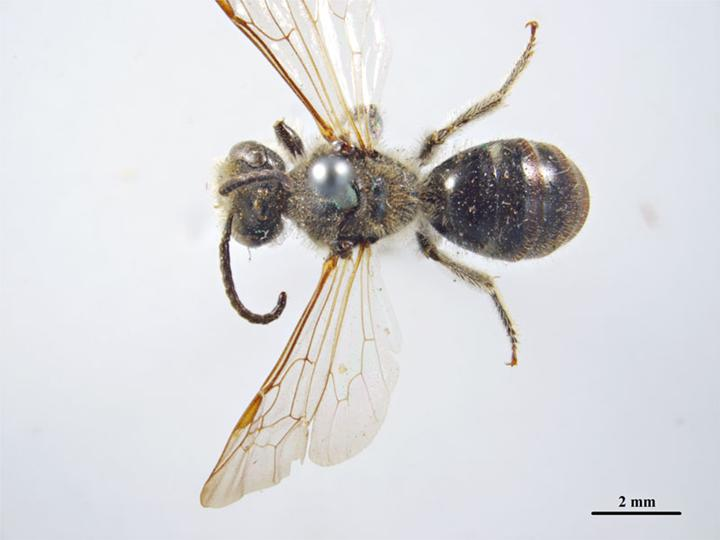
- Male

Scientific classification
- Kingdom: Animalia
- Phylum: Arthropoda
- Clade: Pancrustacea
- Class: Insecta
- Order: Hymenoptera
- Family: Halictidae
- Genus: Lasioglossum
- Species: L. seductum

Binomial name
- Lasioglossum seductum (Cockerell, 1914)

Synonyms
- Halictus seductus Cockerell, 1914; Halictus seductus nudus Rayment, 1935

= Lasioglossum seductum =

Species of bee

Lasioglossum seductum, or Lasioglossum (Chilalictus) seductum, is a species of bee in the family Halictidae and subfamily Halictinae. It is endemic to Australia. It was described by British-American entomologist Theodore Dru Alison Cockerell in 1914.

== Description ==
Female body length is about 10 mm. Integumental colouration is mainly black, with reddish markings; the hair is white to grey-brown.

== Distribution and habitat ==
The species occurs in south-eastern Australia. Type localities include Windsor and Sorrento in Victoria.

== Behaviour ==
The adults are flying mellivores that nest in soil. Flowering plants visited by the bees include Acacia, Arctotheca, Boronia, Carpobrotus, Conospermum, Euphrasia, Hibbertia, Hypochaeris, Leucopogon, Myoporum, Pultenaea, Veronica and Xanthorrhoea species.
