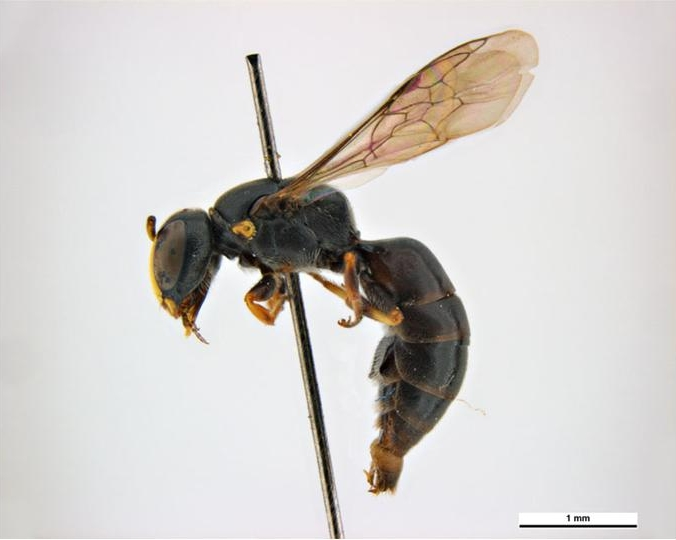
- Male

Scientific classification
- Kingdom: Animalia
- Phylum: Arthropoda
- Clade: Pancrustacea
- Class: Insecta
- Order: Hymenoptera
- Family: Colletidae
- Genus: Hylaeus
- Species: H. quadriceps

Binomial name
- Hylaeus quadriceps (Smith, 1879)

Synonyms
- Prosopis quadriceps Smith, 1879; Prosopis hobartiana Cockerell, 1905; Gnathoprosopis marianella Rayment, 1931; Gnathoprosopis striata Rayment, 1935

= Hylaeus quadriceps =

Species of bee

Hylaeus quadriceps, or Hylaeus (Planihylaeus) quadriceps, is a species of bee in the family Colletidae and subfamily Hylaeinae. It is endemic to Australia. It was described by English entomologist Frederick Smith in 1879.

== Distribution and habitat ==
The species occurs in southern Australia. Type localities include Hobart in Tasmania, Ferntree Gully in Victoria, and Denmark, Western Australia.

== Behaviour ==
The adults are solitary flying mellivores with sedentary larvae. They nest in Juncus effusus reeds. Flowering plants visited by the bees include Arctotheca, Hypochaeris, Lobelia and Wahlenbergia species.
