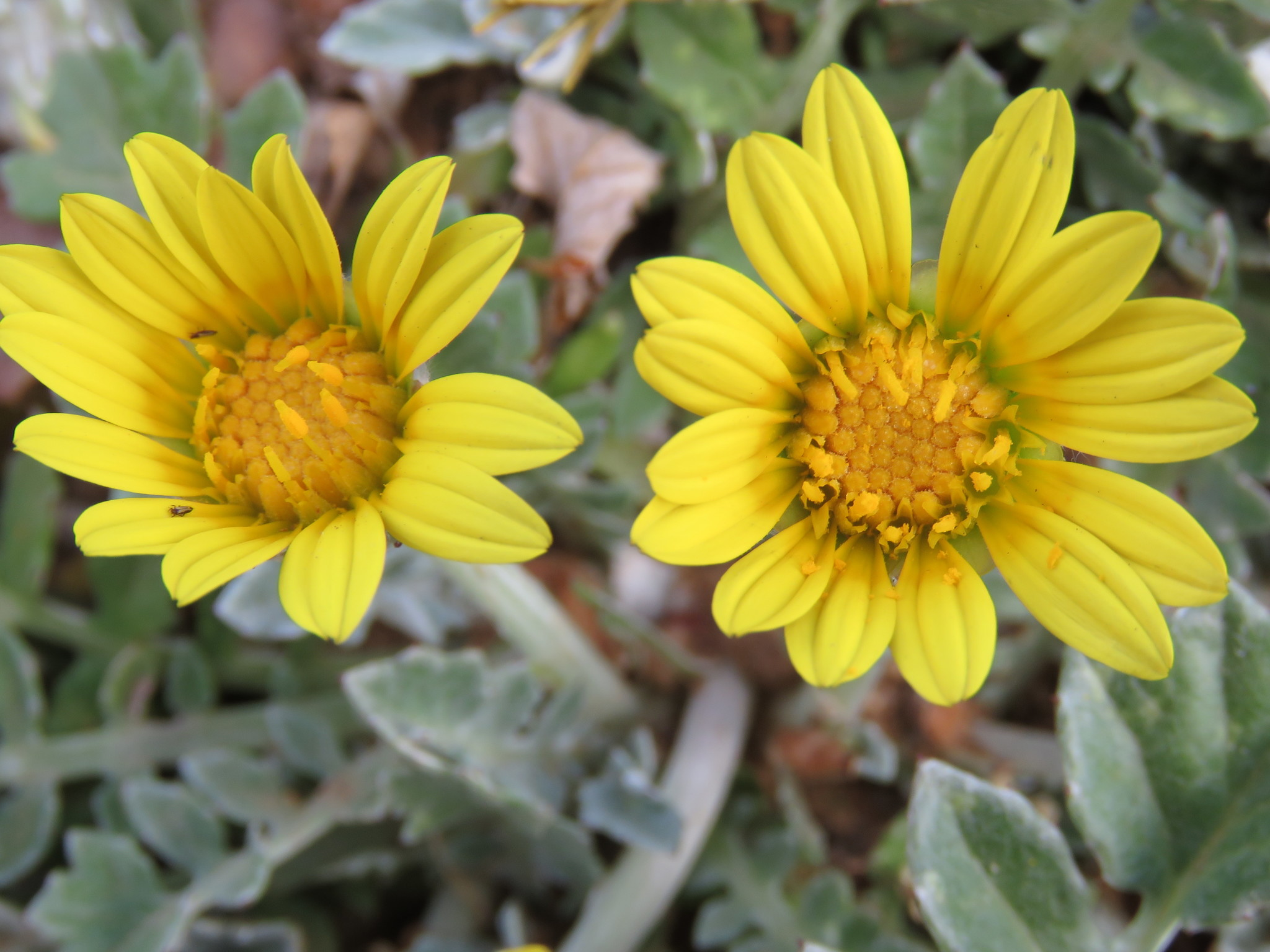

Scientific classification
- Kingdom: Plantae
- Clade: Tracheophytes
- Clade: Angiosperms
- Clade: Eudicots
- Clade: Asterids
- Order: Asterales
- Family: Asteraceae
- Genus: Arctotheca
- Species: A. prostrata

Binomial name
- Arctotheca prostrata (Salisb.) Britten

Synonyms
- Synonymy: Arctotheca grandiflora Schrad.; Arctotheca hirta Schrad. ex Steud.; Arctotheca repens J.C.Wendl.; Arctotis interrupta Thunb.; Arctotis prostrata Salisb.; Arctotis repens Jacq.

= Arctotheca prostrata =

Species of plant

Arctotheca prostrata (commonly known as Capeweed, South African Capeweed, Cape Dandelion, and Cape Gold) is a rosette-forming plant in the family Asteraceae native to Namibia and the Cape Provinces of South Africa. The infertile form is often cultivated as a ground cover, while the fertile form spreads rapidly in disturbed areas like beside roads and trails, threatening native ecosystems. It is listed as an invasive weed in California and Australia.

== History ==
The introduction of this plant to regions outside of its native South African range likely occurred through the horticultural trade, as it was valued for its use as an ornamental ground cover. Its spread in California and Australia is particularly well-documented, where it quickly became invasive due to its ability to thrive in disturbed areas. This species found ideal conditions in California along the coastal prairies and urban areas, where it was established through stolon propagation. Over time, the spread of the fertile form of this plant in Australia has had significant agricultural impacts, smothering crops and dominating overgrazed pastures.

Initially introduced with ornamental intentions, herbarium studies indicate that this species is sterile, although some reports suggest a fertile, invasive variety. This plant is difficult to control once established and has naturalized in regions where Arctotheca calendula is also present. Arctotheca prostrata has been given a moderate invasiveness rating by Cal-IPC.

== Habitat ==
Arctotheca prostrata thrives in coastal prairies, sandy soils, and disturbed areas. It has naturalized in parts of California, particularly along the north, central, and southern coasts. While the sterile form is cultivated as an ornamental ground cover, the fertile form poses significant ecological threats due to its rapid spread and colonization in disturbed habitats.

== Appearance ==
The Arctotheca prostrata is characterized by a prostrate growth that is low, flat, and leans on the ground. Leaves are described to be oval or slightly lobed with a pale green color on the adaxial surface and a silver coating on the surface, which gives the leaf of the flower a glossy appearance. In addition to this, Arctotheca prostrata has small, daisy-like flowers in a bright yellow arrangement that mimics that of a sunflower and looks quite prominent against the dull green leaves. These flowers perch on very short stalks, or pedicels, that instantly provide a splash of color but do not extend too high. The plant exhibits these rooted runners known as creeping stolons which give the plant a blanket-like appearance. This annual herbaceous plant grows slowly (mainly during late winter) and has semi-flowering stems up to 11.8 inches (30 cm) tall. It either has small creeping or spreading stems before flowering, or it is stemless and forms a basal rosette. As for its petals and foliage, they can range in size from 2-10 inches (5-25 cm) cm long and 1.4 (2-6 cm) wide. The most noticeable feature of the flower is its 20-26 bright yellow flower petals, each ranging in size from 0.4-1 inch (1–2.5 cm), while the flower size itself is around 2.5 inches (6.5cm).

== Containing the species ==
Arctotheca prostrata is measured on the Cal-IPC ratings. Depending on an organism's negative impact on its newfound ecological ecosystem, it is rated as high, moderate, limited, alert, and watch. Cal-IPC has given Arctotheca prostrata a moderate rating, meaning that these species have noticeable and significant ecological effects on vegetation structure, plant and animal populations, and physical processes, although they are usually not severe. Although establishment often requires ecological disturbance, their reproductive biology and other characteristics support moderate to high spread rates. Even though Arctotheca prostrata does not cause noticeable harm to its ecosystem, it is a fierce invader and difficult to exterminate once present in a new environment. In residential gardens, pastures, and crops, Arctotheca prostrata can be a troublesome weed. There are instances where it may choke out grass and clover seedlings in recently seeded pastures, and in dry areas, it frequently takes over overgrazed pastures, even up to the entire area.
