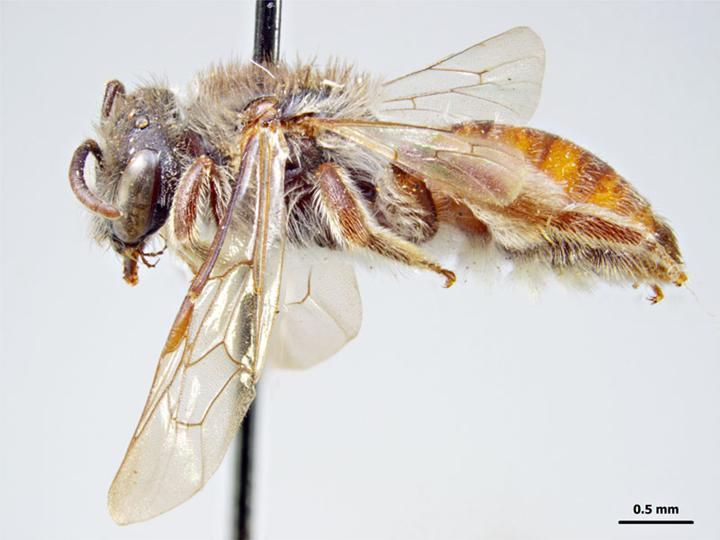
- Female

Scientific classification
- Kingdom: Animalia
- Phylum: Arthropoda
- Clade: Pancrustacea
- Class: Insecta
- Order: Hymenoptera
- Family: Colletidae
- Genus: Leioproctus
- Species: L. maculatus

Binomial name
- Leioproctus maculatus (Rayment, 1930)

Synonyms
- Paracolletes maculatus Rayment, 1930

= Leioproctus maculatus =

Species of bee

Leioproctus maculatus, or Leioproctus (Leioproctus) maculatus, is a species of bee in the family Colletidae and subfamily Colletinae. It is endemic to Australia. It was described by Australian entomologist Tarlton Rayment in 1930.

== Description ==
Female body length is about 10 mm, male about 9 mm. Integumental colouration is mainly black, the abdomen red, the hair white to drab and golden.

== Distribution and habitat ==
The species occurs across southern mainland Australia. The type locality is Sandringham, Victoria.

== Behaviour ==
The adults are flying mellivores. Flowering plants visited by the bees include Arctotheca, Leucopogon, Myoporum, Cassia, Eutaxia and Eucalyptus species.
