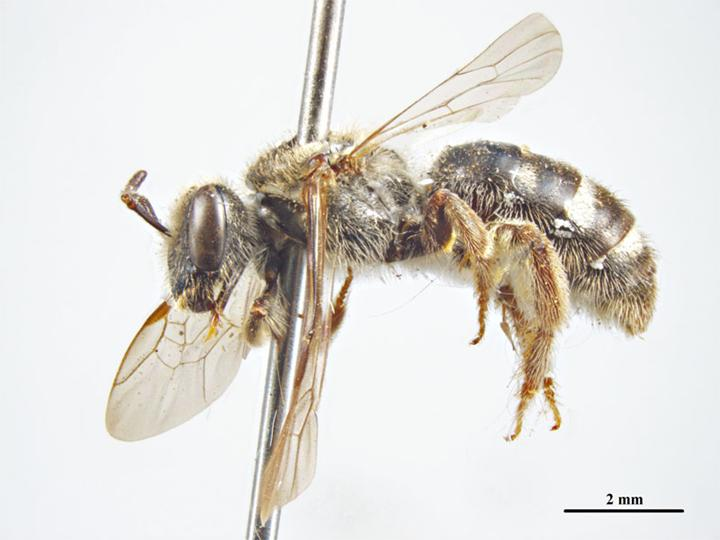
- Female

Scientific classification
- Kingdom: Animalia
- Phylum: Arthropoda
- Clade: Pancrustacea
- Class: Insecta
- Order: Hymenoptera
- Family: Halictidae
- Genus: Lasioglossum
- Species: L. repraesentans

Binomial name
- Lasioglossum repraesentans Smith, 1853

Synonyms
- Halictus repraesentans Smith, 1853; Halictus seductus aptus Rayment, 1935; Halictus seductus gippsii Rayment, 1935

= Lasioglossum repraesentans =

Species of bee

Lasioglossum repraesentans, or Lasioglossum (Chilalictus) repraesentans, is a species of bee in the family Halictidae and subfamily Halictinae. It is endemic to Australia. It was described by English entomologist Frederick Smith in 1853.

== Distribution and habitat ==
The species occurs in south-eastern Australia. Type localities include Hurstbridge and Leongatha in Victoria.

== Behaviour ==
The adults are flying mellivores. Flowering plants visited by the bees include Arctotheca, Bursaria, Daviesia, Eucalyptus, Hakea, Kunzea, Leptospermum, Persoonia, Senecio, Spyridium and Watsonia species.

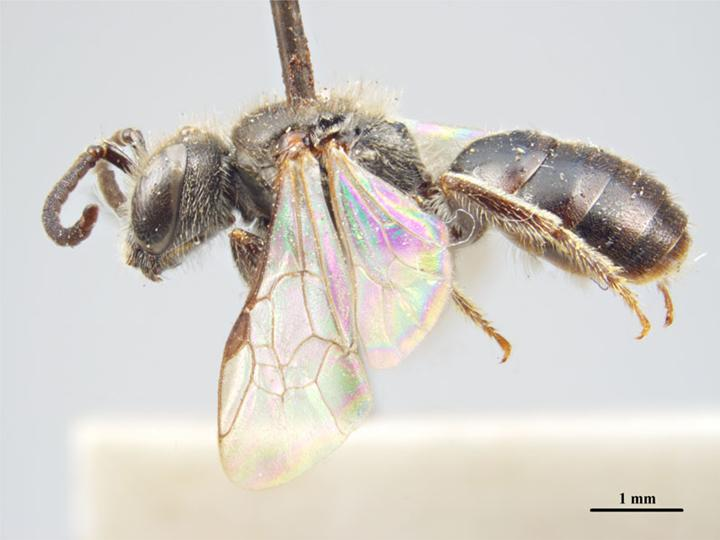
Male
