= KOAZ (disambiguation) =

KOAZ may refer to:

== People ==
- Eddy Koaz (born 1959), Israeli Olympic judoka

== Radio and tv stations ==
- 1510 KOAZ Isleta, New Mexico (facility ID #65389) — an AM station that formerly used the callsigns KABR and KMYN when it was on 1500 kHz
- 48 KOAZ-LP O'Neill, Nebraska (facility ID #128007) — a short-lived low-power TV station that relayed KFXL-TV and went off the air in 2011
- 97.5 KSZR Oro Valley, Arizona (facility ID #39734) — an FM station that used the callsign KOAZ from 1998 to 2003
- 103.5 KLNZ Glendale, Arizona (facility ID #48738) — an FM station that used the callsign KOAZ from 1996 to 1997, then KWCY before KLNZ
