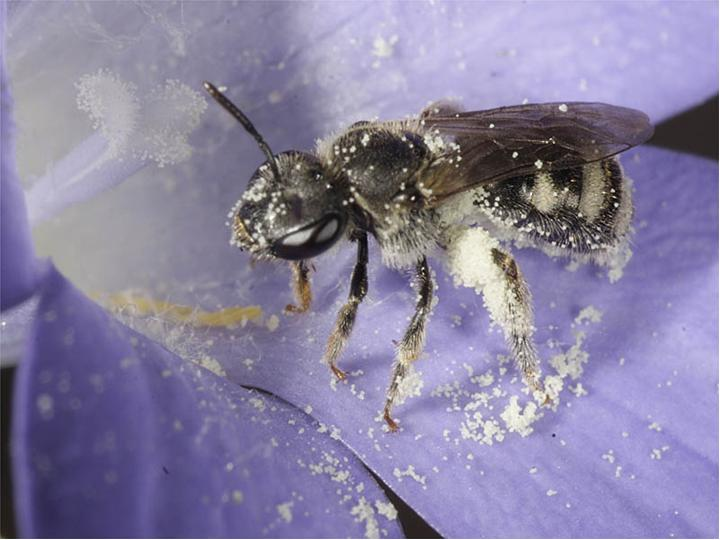
- Female
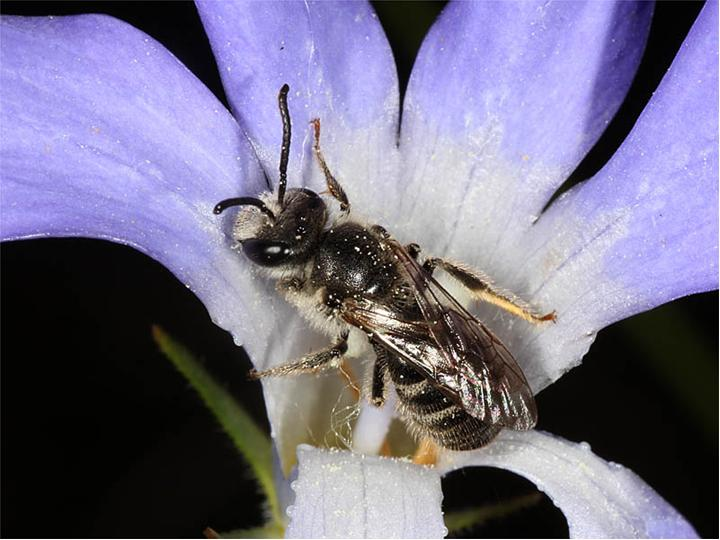
- Male

Scientific classification
- Kingdom: Animalia
- Phylum: Arthropoda
- Clade: Pancrustacea
- Class: Insecta
- Order: Hymenoptera
- Family: Halictidae
- Genus: Lasioglossum
- Species: L. willsi

Binomial name
- Lasioglossum willsi (Cockerell, 1906)

Synonyms
- Halictus willsi Cockerell, 1906; Lasioglossum (Chilalictus) wahlenbergiae Michener, 1965

= Lasioglossum willsi =

Species of bee

Lasioglossum willsi, or Lasioglossum (Ctenonomia) willsi, is a species of bee in the family Halictidae and subfamily Halictinae. It is endemic to Australia. It was described by British-American entomologist Theodore Dru Alison Cockerell in 1906.

== Description ==
Male body length is about 6 mm. Integumental colouration is mainly black, with reddish markings; the hair is white.

== Distribution and habitat ==
The species occurs in eastern and south-eastern Australia. Type localities include Armidale in New South Wales.

== Behaviour ==
The adults are flying mellivores. Flowering plants visited by the bees include Arctotheca, Atalaya, Cymbidium, Daviesia, Eucalyptus, Lippia, Schinus and Wahlenbergia species.
