= João Neves (disambiguation) =

João Neves may refer to:

- João Neves (judoka), Portuguese judoka
- João Neves (footballer), Portuguese footballer
