= Jorge di Noco =

Argentine judoka (born 1966)

Personal information
- Nationality: Argentine
- Born: 27 February 1966 (age 59)

Sport
- Sport: Judo

Jorge di Noco (born 27 February 1966) is an Argentine judoka. He competed in the men's extra-lightweight event at the 1984 Summer Olympics.
