= Mohamed Madhar =

Surinamese judoka

Personal information
- Nationality: Surinamese
- Born: 28 October 1962 (age 63)

Sport
- Sport: Judo

Mohamed Shies Madhar (born 28 October 1962) is a Surinamese judoka, who represented his country at the 1984 Summer Olympics and 1988 Summer Olympics.

Madhar was just 21 years old when he competed in the 1984 Summer Olympics in the 60 kg event. He became the first Surinamese judoka to win a contest at the Olympics, when he beat Christian Nkamgang from Cameroon in the first round; however, he was then beaten in the second round by West German Peter Jupke. Four years later in the 1988 Summer Olympics he competed in the same weight division, but lost this time in the first round against Korean Kim Jae-yup, who went on to win the gold medal.
