= Patrick Roux =

French judoka (born 1962)

Personal information
- Born: 29 April 1962 (age 64)
- Occupation: Judoka

Sport
- Country: France
- Sport: Judo
- Weight class: ‍–‍60 kg

Achievements and titles
- Olympic Games: 5th (1988)
- World Champ.: (bronze) (1987)
- European Champ.: (gold) (1987)
Medal record
Men's judo
Representing France
World Championships
Bronze medal – third place	1987 Essen	‍–‍60 kg
European Championships
Gold medal – first place	1987 Paris	‍–‍60 kg
Silver medal – second place	1988 Pamplona	‍–‍60 kg
Bronze medal – third place	1984 Liege	‍–‍60 kg
Bronze medal – third place	1985 Hamar	‍–‍60 kg
Bronze medal – third place	1986 Belgrade	‍–‍60 kg
Summer Universiade
Silver medal – second place	1986 Sao Paulo	‍–‍60 kg
Bronze medal – third place	1984 Strasbourg	‍–‍60 kg

Profile at external databases
- IJF: 11846
- JudoInside.com: 2524
- Updated on 8 July 2024

Patrick Roux (born 29 April 1962) is a French judoka. He competed in the men's extra-lightweight event at the 1988 Summer Olympics.
