= Gilles Pages =

Monegasque judoka (born 1963)

Personal information
- Nationality: Monegasque
- Born: 17 September 1963 (age 61)

Sport
- Sport: Judo

Gilles Pages (born 17 September 1963) is a Monegasque judoka. He competed in the men's extra-lightweight event at the 1988 Summer Olympics.
