= Botev (surname) =

Botev (Bulgarian: Ботев), feminine Boteva (Bulgarian: Ботева), is a Bulgarian surname. Notable people with the surname include:

- Anton Botev (born 1986), Azerbaijani Olympic wrestler
- Gratsian Botev (1928–1981), Soviet sprint canoer
- Hristo Botev (1847–1876), Bulgarian poet and revolutionary
- Ivan Botev (born 1955), Bulgarian Olympic rower
- Nikolay Botev (born 1963), Bulgarian Olympic bobsledder
- Pavel Botev (born 1963), Bulgarian Olympic judoka
- Stefan Botev (born 1968), Bulgarian weightlifter
- Neli Boteva (born 1974), Bulgarian badminton player
