= Salvador Hernández (judoka) =

Mexican judoka

Personal information
- Nationality: Mexican
- Born: 31 July 1961
- Died: 31 January 2022 (aged 60)

Sport
- Sport: Judo

Salvador Hernández (31 July 1961 – 31 January 2022) was a Mexican judoka. He competed in the men's extra-lightweight event at the 1988 Summer Olympics.
