= Michel Estephan =

Lebanese judoka

Personal information
- Nationality: Lebanese
- Born: 15 March 1959 (age 66)

Sport
- Sport: Judo

Michel Estephan (born 15 March 1959) is a Lebanese judoka. He competed in the men's extra-lightweight event at the 1984 Summer Olympics.
