= Neil Eckersley =

British judoka (born 1964)

Personal information
- Nationality: British (English)
- Born: 5 April 1964 (age 62)
- Occupation: Judoka
- Website: www.olyart.no

Sport
- Country: Great Britain
- Sport: Judo
- Weight class: –‍60 kg

Achievements and titles
- Olympic Games: (bronze) (1984)
- World Champ.: 7th (1987)
- European Champ.: (bronze) (1987, 1988)
- Commonwealth Games: (silver) (1986)
Medal record
Men's judo
Representing Great Britain
Olympic Games
Bronze medal – third place	1984 Los Angeles	‍–‍60 kg
European Championships
Bronze medal – third place	1987 Paris	‍–‍60 kg
Bronze medal – third place	1988 Pamplona	‍–‍60 kg
European Junior Championships
Bronze medal – third place	1983 Arnhem	‍–‍60 kg
Representing England
Commonwealth Games
Silver medal – second place	1986 Edinburgh	‍–‍60 kg

Profile at external databases
- IJF: 53654
- JudoInside.com: 4926
- Updated on 19 June 2023

Neil Eckersley (born 5 April 1964) is a retired judoka from the United Kingdom, who represented Great Britain at the 1984 Summer Olympics in Los Angeles, California. There he won a bronze medal in the men's extra-lightweight division (‍–‍60 kg), alongside USA's Edward "Ed" Liddie.

== Judo career ==
In 1986, he won the silver medal in the 60 kg weight category at the judo demonstration sport event as part of the 1986 Commonwealth Games.

Bronze Olympic medallist. Olympic British team captain. European medallist. Placed seventh at the world Championships. Winning a bronze medal in the light-weight division (-60 kg) of the 1987 Matsutarō Shoriki cup in Tokyo likely made Eckersley to become the first British male judoka to win a medal during a major international tournament held in Japan. Since December 2014 Eckersley has held the rank of 7th dan awarded by the British Judo Association and International judo Federation. Eckersley holds a Diploma in Sports Coaching from Herriott Watt University in Edinburgh, and in 2005 completed a Bachelor of Arts (Hon.) degree in Sports Studies at St. Martins College, Lancaster, today known as the University of Cumbria. In 2015, Eckersley with IJF 7 Dan certificates on Day 1 of the British Open.

Eckersley is a judo instructor and from 2014 he has been head of the regional program in Judoregion West in Norway and club coach in Sandnes Judo Club.

Eckersley is a painter and digital artist and member of Art of the Olympians (AOTO).
