= Ireneusz Kiejda =

Polish judoka

Personal information
- Nationality: Polish
- Born: 30 January 1964 (age 61); Rejów, Poland

Sport
- Sport: Judo

Ireneusz Kiejda (born 30 January 1964) is a Polish judoka. He competed in the men's extra-lightweight event at the 1988 Summer Olympics.
