= Capuava =

- District
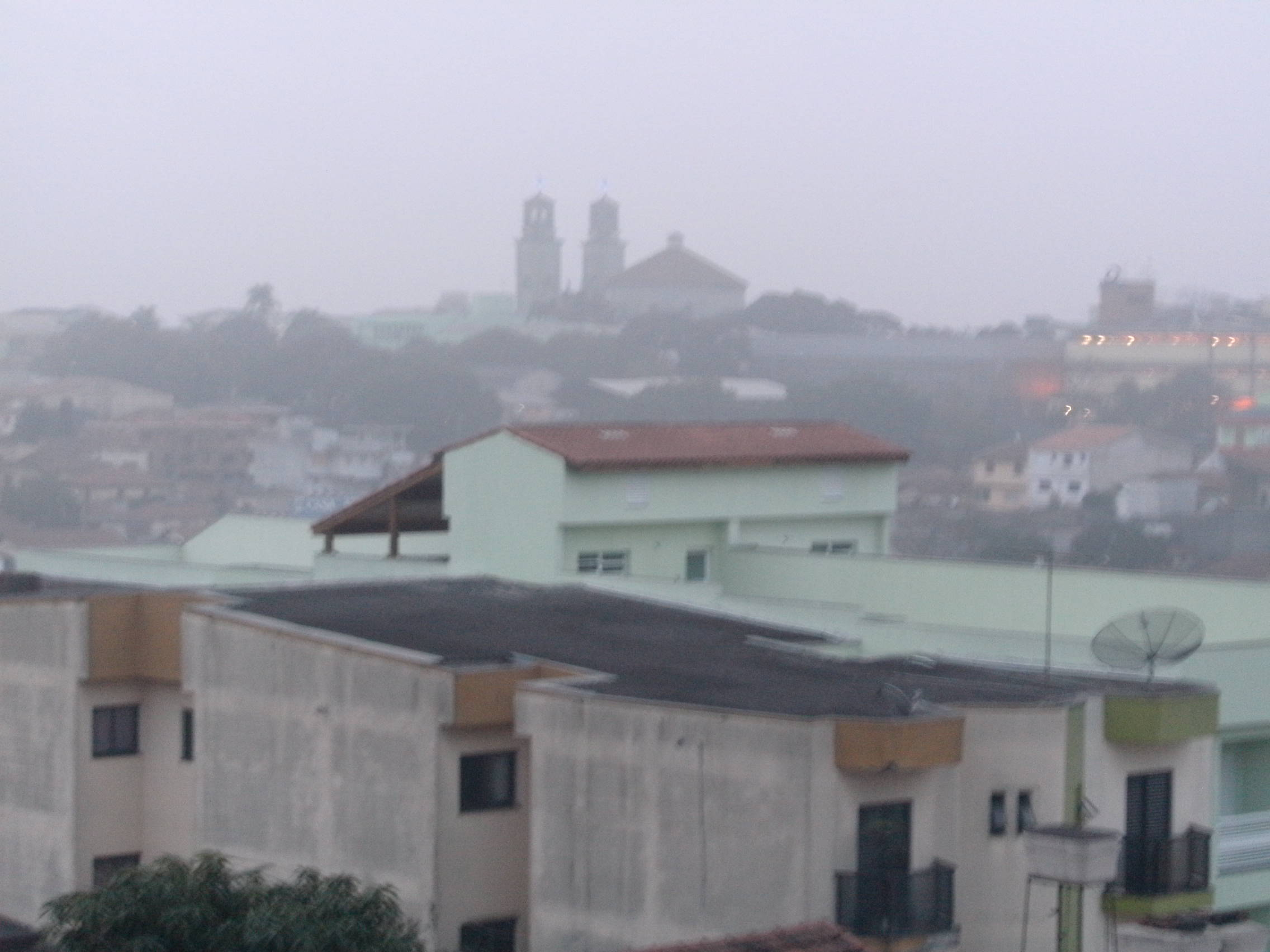
- Interactive map of Capuava
- Coordinates: 23°38′40″S 46°29′47″W
- Country: Brazil
- State: São Paulo

Area
  - Total: 10.943 km^{2} (4.225 sq mi)

Population (2022)
  - Total: 104,697
  - Density: 9,567.5/km^{2} (24,780/sq mi)
- Time zone: UTC-3

Capuava is a district of the municipality of Santo André, in the Brazilian state of São Paulo.

Created in 1985, the district of Capuava was formed from a part of the Utinga subdistrict, and is situated in one of the most industrialized regions of the city. Geopolitical researchers say that one of the reasons for the creation of this new district was mainly to prevent the subdistrict of Utinga from separating from Santo André, since the industrial power of Utinga was set in Capuava zone.

It is constituted by the following suburbs: Jardim Alzira Franco, Jardim Ana Maria, Jardim Itapoan, Jardim Santo Alberto, Parque Capuava, Parque Erasmo Assunção, Parque Jaçatuba, Parque João Ramalho, Parque Novo Oratório, Varzea do Tamanduateí, Vila Curuçá and Jardim Rina.
