= Amiran Totikashvili =

Georgian judoka (born 1969)

Personal information
- Born: 21 July 1969 (age 56) Martkopi, Kvemo Kartli, Georgian SSR, Soviet Union
- Occupation: Judoka

Sport
- Country: Soviet Union
- Sport: Judo

Achievements and titles
- Olympic Games: (bronze) (1988)
- World Champ.: (1989)
- European Champ.: (gold) (1988, 1989)
Medal record
Men's judo
Representing Soviet Union
Olympic Games
Bronze medal – third place	1988 Seoul	‍–‍60 kg
World Championships
Gold medal – first place	1989 Belgrade	‍–‍60 kg
European Championships
Gold medal – first place	1988 Pamplona	‍–‍60 kg
Gold medal – first place	1989 Helsinki	‍–‍60 kg
Bronze medal – third place	1990 Frankfurt	‍–‍60 kg

Profile at external databases
- IJF: 53635, 1719
- JudoInside.com: 5747
- Updated on 6 June 2023

Amiran Totikashvili (Georgian: ამირან ტოტიკაშვილი) (born 21 July 1969 in Martkopi) is a Georgian judoka who competed for the Soviet Union in the 1988 Summer Olympics. There he won the bronze medal in the extra lightweight class. He is the current trainer of the Turkmenistan National Judo team.

He is also two times European champion in 1988 Pamplona and 1989 Helsinki. He was a Bronze medalist in 1990 Frankfurt.

Champion International Tournaments in Paris in 1990 and the Goodwill Games in Seattle.

== Coach career ==
In March 2019, it became known that Amiran Totikashvili would train Turkmenistan judo wrestlers for the 2020 Summer Olympics, which will be held in Tokyo.
