= Abdel Hamid Slimani =

Moroccan judoka

Personal information
- Nationality: Moroccan
- Born: 19 February 1956 (age 69)

Sport
- Sport: Judo

Abdel Hamid Slimani (born 19 February 1956) is a Moroccan judoka. He competed in the men's extra-lightweight event at the 1984 Summer Olympics.
