= Ricardo Belmonte =

Bolivian judoka

Personal information
- Nationality: Bolivian
- Born: 20 June 1965 (age 59)

Sport
- Sport: Judo

Ricardo Belmonte (born 20 June 1965) is a Bolivian judoka. He competed in the men's extra-lightweight event at the 1988 Summer Olympics.
