= Djibril Sall =

Senegalese judoka

Personal information
- Nationality: Senegalese
- Born: 6 April 1961 (age 63)

Sport
- Sport: Judo

Djibril Sall (born 6 April 1961) is a Senegalese judoka. He competed in the men's extra-lightweight event at the 1984 Summer Olympics.
