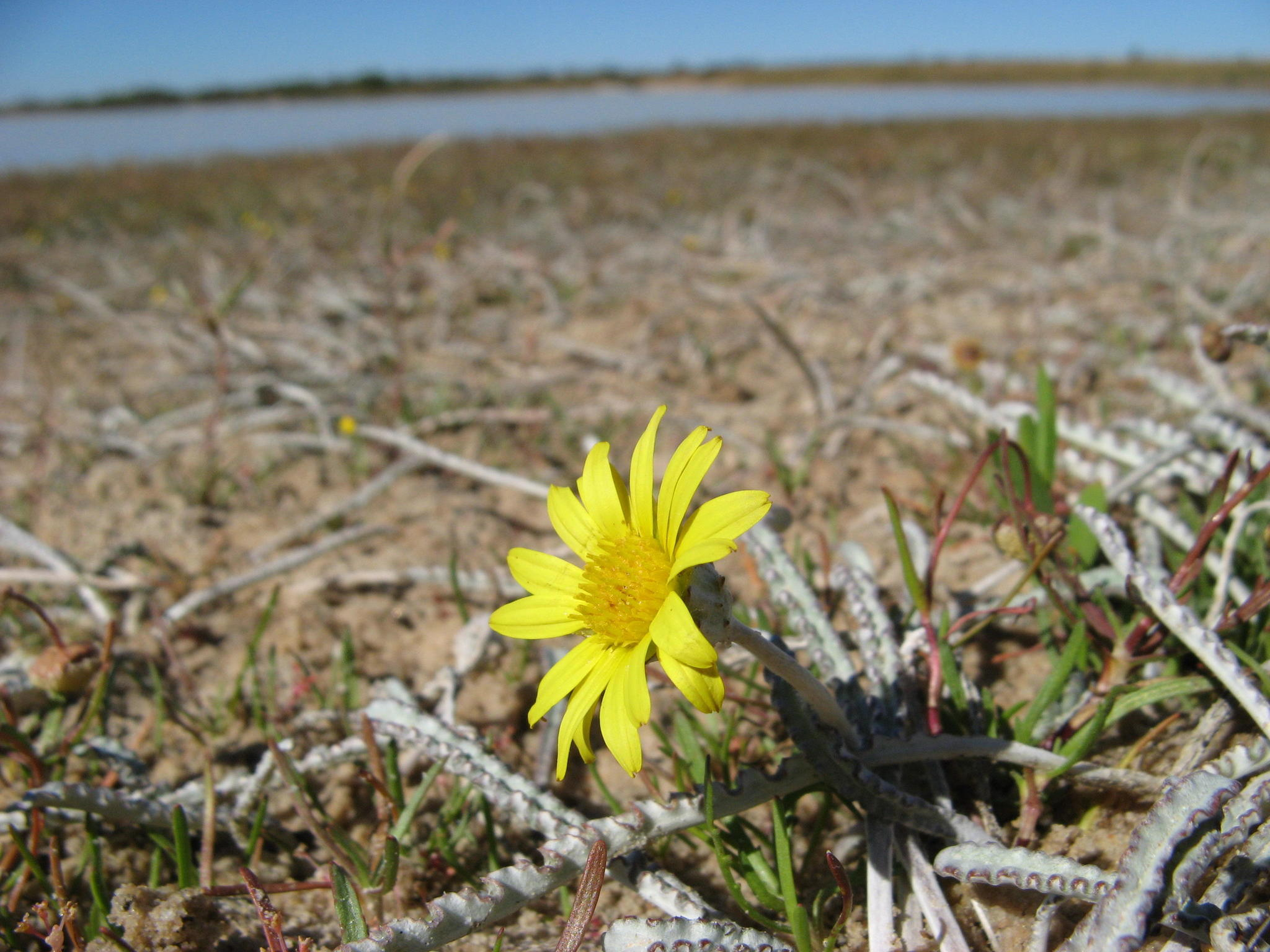

Scientific classification
- Kingdom: Plantae
- Clade: Tracheophytes
- Clade: Angiosperms
- Clade: Eudicots
- Clade: Asterids
- Order: Asterales
- Family: Asteraceae
- Genus: Arctotheca
- Species: A. marginata

Binomial name
- Arctotheca marginata Beyers (2002)

= Arctotheca marginata =

Species of plant

Arctotheca marginata is a plant belonging to the genus Arctotheca. The species is endemic to the Northern Cape and occurs on the Bokkeveld Mountains escarpment near Nieuwoudtville where it is part of the fynbos is. There are two subpopulations on one farm and they are threatened by overgrazing and the extraction of groundwater.
