= Utinga (Santo André) =

Utinga is a district in the city of Santo André, state of São Paulo, Brazil. Located at the banks of Tamanduateí River.

It is constituted by the following suburbs: Camilópolis, Santa Terezinha, Vila Sá, Parque das Nações, Parque Novo Oratório, Vila Metalúrgica e Bangu.

In 1985 the Utinga district was split in two, resulting in the creation of Capuava's district.
