= Chau Chin-fu =

Taiwanese judoka

Personal information
- Full name: 趙 進富, Pinyin: Zhào Jìn-fù
- Nationality: Taiwanese
- Born: 28 October 1952 (age 72)

Sport
- Sport: Judo

Chau Chin-fu (born 28 October 1952) is a Taiwanese judoka. He competed in the men's extra-lightweight event at the 1984 Summer Olympics.
