= Yeung Luen Lin =

Hong Kong judoka (born 1956)

Personal information
- Nationality: Hong Konger
- Born: 8 February 1956 (age 69)

Sport
- Sport: Judo

Yeung Luen Lin (born 8 February 1956) is a Hong Kong judoka who lasted 1:02 in the 60 kg event at the 1984 Summer Olympics.
