= Sérgio Pessoa (judoka, born 1962) =

Brazilian judoka

Personal information
- Full name: Sérgio Antônio Almeida Pessoa
- Born: 5 July 1962 (age 63) São Paulo, Brazil
- Occupation: Judoka

Sport
- Country: Brazil
- Sport: Judo
- Weight class: ‍–‍60 kg

Achievements and titles
- Olympic Games: R16 (1988)
- World Champ.: 5th (1987)
- Pan American Champ.: (1986, 1988)
Medal record
Men's judo
Representing Brazil
Pan American Games
Gold medal – first place	1987 Indianapolis	‍–‍60 kg
Pan American Championships
Gold medal – first place	1986 Salinas	‍–‍60 kg
Gold medal – first place	1988 Buenos Aires	‍–‍60 kg

Profile at external databases
- IJF: 134
- JudoInside.com: 715
- Updated on 28 November 2023

Sérgio Antônio Almeida Pessoa (born 5 July 1962) is a Brazilian judoka. He competed in the men's extra-lightweight event at the 1988 Summer Olympics.
