= Ali Idir =

Algerian judoka

Personal information
- Nationality: Algerian
- Born: 22 December 1966 (age 59)
- Occupation: Judoka

Sport
- Sport: Judo

Profile at external databases
- JudoInside.com: 10623

Ali Idir (born 22 December 1966) is an Algerian judoka. He competed in the men's extra-lightweight event at the 1988 Summer Olympics.
