= Santo André, São Paulo =

Santo André
- Municipality
- Municipality of Santo André
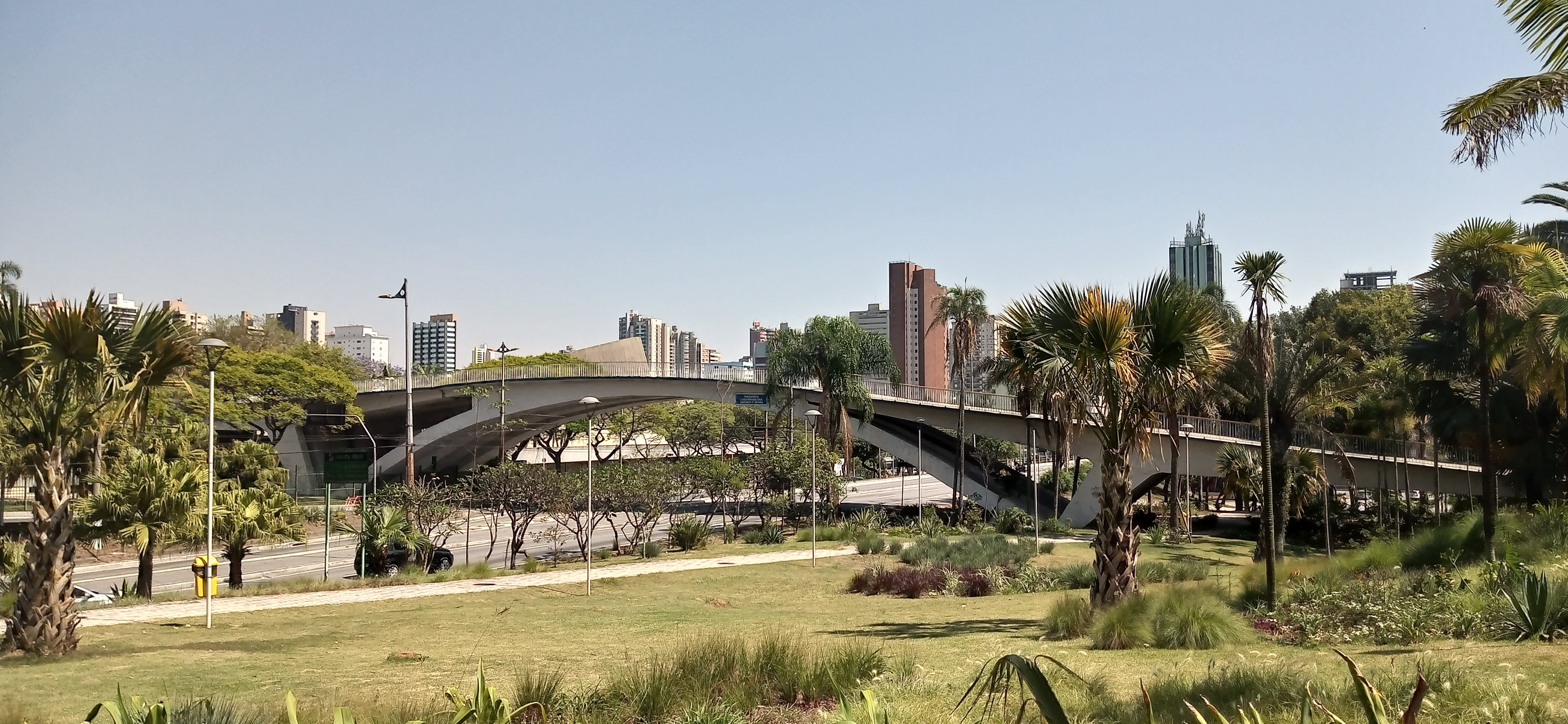
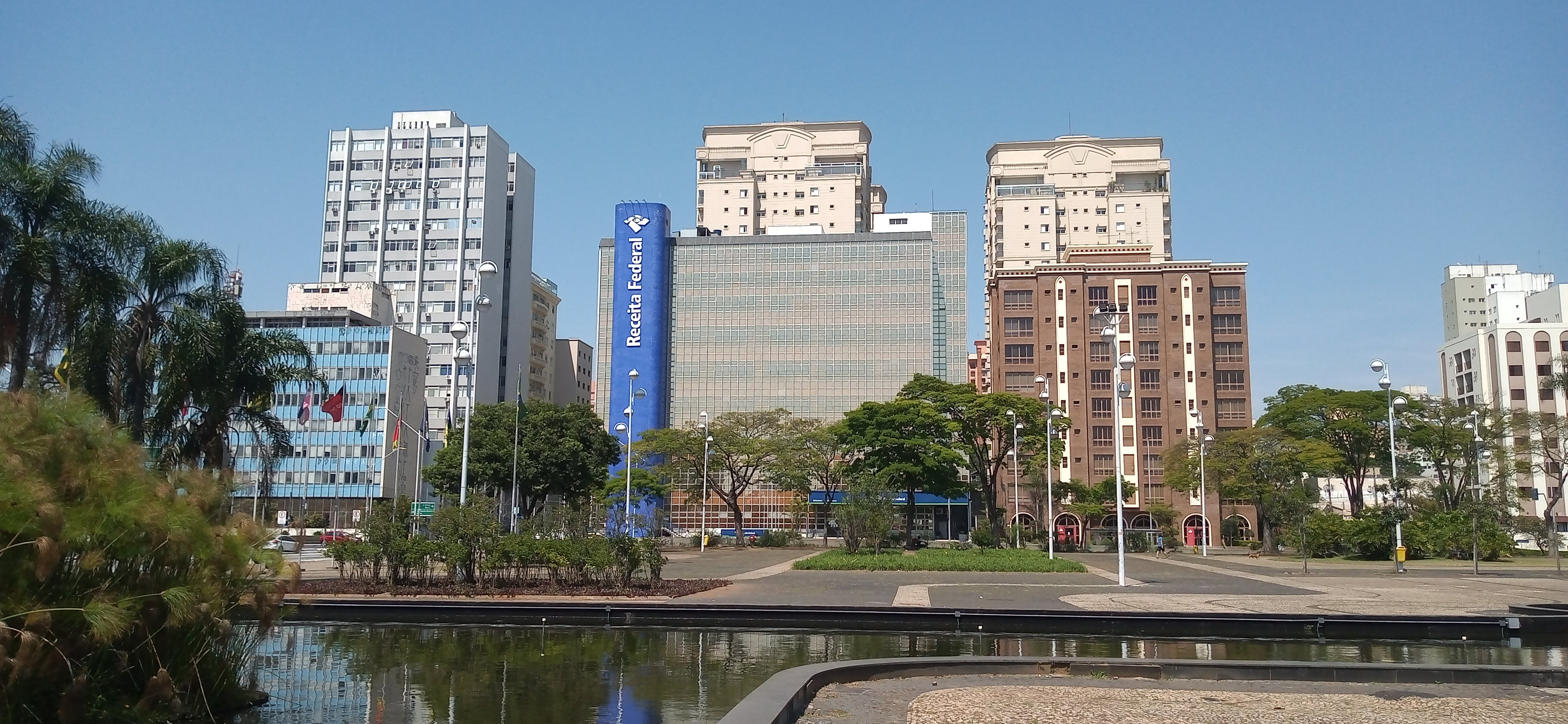
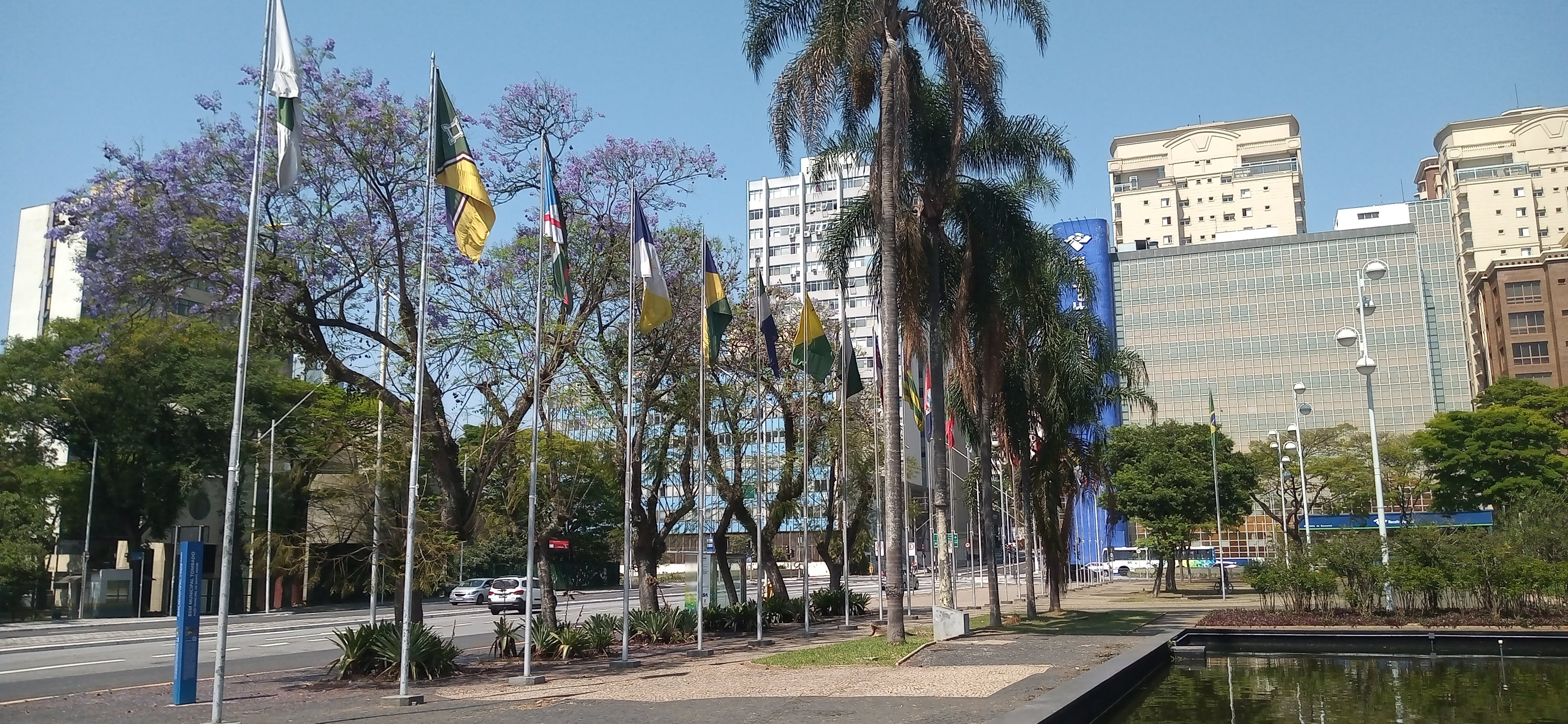

- Flag Coat of arms
- Motto: Paulistarum terra mater (Latin)
- Location in São Paulo
- Coordinates: 23°39′26″S 46°32′00″W
- Country: Brazil
- Region: Southeast
- State: São Paulo
- Named for: Andrew the Apostle

Government
  - Mayor: Gilvan Junior (PSDB)

Area
  - Total: 175.8 km^{2} (67.9 sq mi)
- Elevation: 700 m (2,300 ft)

Population (2024)
  - Total: 778,711
  - Density: 4,430/km^{2} (11,470/sq mi)
- Demonym: andreense
- Time zone: UTC-03:00 (BRT)
- Postal code: 09000-000
- Area code: +55 11
- HDI (2010): 0.815 – very high
- Website: web.santoandre.sp.gov.br

Santo André (Portuguese pronunciation: [sɐ̃twɐ̃ˈdɾɛ], Saint Andrew) is a Brazilian municipality located in the Metropolitan Region of São Paulo. It is part of a group of municipalities known as the ABC Region. According to the most recent census in 2024, the population is estimated at 778,711 in an area of 175.8 km^{2} (67.9 sq mi). or about 43,441 Acres of landmass.

It is the 15th most developed Brazilian city, and the eighth most developed city in the State of São Paulo, according to the UN. The city is also known to be the fifth best city in the country to raise children on the grounds of public and private education and health care.

== History ==
The first settlement named Santo André in the region where the modern city stands was founded by João Ramalho in 1553, with the name of Santo André da Borda do Campo. However, this first village was short lived, as in 1560, the then governor-general of the State of Brazil, Mem de Sá, ordered the transfer of inhabitants to the proximities of the Jesuit college of São Paulo, which was deemed to be in a more secure position.

A town with the name of Santo André would only emerge again in the 1938, when the headquarters of the then municipality of São Bernardo was transferred to the proximities of the then-district of Santo André, near a train station founded in 1867 by means of the São Paulo Railway Company. The town experienced rapid growth beginning in the 1930s.

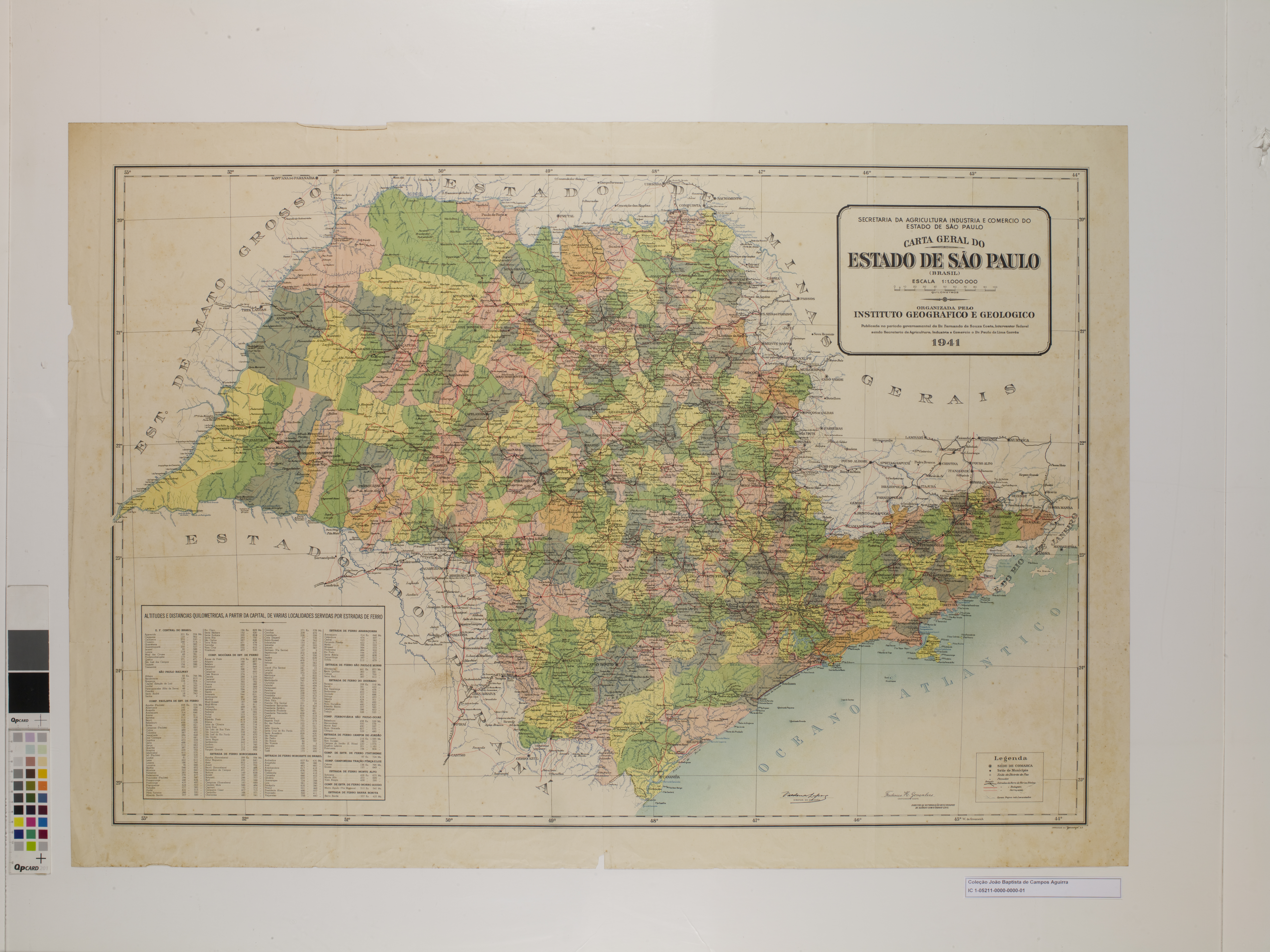
Map of the state of São Paulo (1938).

Industries include chemical engineering, textiles, oil, metal products, metallurgy and printed matter. Despite being an industrial city, more than 60% of Santo André's total area are protected by environmental water laws, mainly in the district of Paranapiacaba.

In 1954, it became the seat of the Roman Catholic Diocese of Santo André.

In 2002, the city rose to national prominence with the assassination of serving mayor Celso Daniel, whose murder remains unsolved.

== Geography ==
=== Districts ===
The municipality is subdivided into the following districts:

- Paranapiacaba
- Utinga
- Capuava

== Demographics ==
Historical population (municipality)
Year	Population	%±
1940	89,874	—
1950	127,032	41.3%
1960	245,147	93.0%
1970	418,826	70.8%
1980	553,077	32.1%
1991	616,991	11.6%
2000	649,331	5.2%
2010	676,407	4.2%
2022	748,919	10.7%

=== Ethnicity ===
Color/Race	Percentage
White	65.2%
Mixed	27.0%
Black	6.4%
Asian	1.3%
Amerindian	0.1%

Source: Census 2022

== Media ==
In telecommunications, the city was served by Companhia Telefônica da Borda do Campo. In July 1998, this company was acquired by Telefónica, which adopted the Vivo brand in 2012. The company is currently an operator of cell phones, fixed lines, internet (fiber optics/4G) and television (satellite and cable).

== Sports ==
=== Football ===
- Football Team - Esporte Clube Santo André, the football (soccer) team of the city
- City Stadium - Estádio Bruno José Daniel - Capacity: 15,157

==== Titles ====
- Brazilian National Cup Champion in 2004, beating Flamengo in final game at Maracanã Stadium in front of more than 80,000 Flamengo fans
- Paulista 2nd Division Champions in 1967, 1975, 1981 and 2008
- Copa Estado de São Paulo, 2003
- Copa São Paulo Under-20, 2002
- Pelé scored his first professional goal ever at Santos Futebol Clube in Santo André Stadium

=== Volleyball ===
- Men's Volleyball Team - Pirelli Volleyball Club
- Men's World Club Champion in 1984
- Later, the team had his name changed to Shopping ABC Santo André due to a new sponsorship contract signed with Shopping ABC, one of the biggest malls in the city.

=== Basketball ===
- Men's Basketball Team - Pinheiros Santo André - Plays Paulista League of Basketball

=== Boxing ===
- Hosts national Olympic team at Pedro Dell'Antonia Gymnasium facilities

== Twin towns – sister cities ==
Santo André is twinned with:

- Ribeira Brava, São Nicolau Island, Cape Verde
- Takasaki, Gunma, Japan

== Notable people ==
- Sandro Dias
- Eloy Casagrande
- André Domingos
- Beatriz Travalon
- Renato Dias Santos
- Danilo Gentili
- Daniele Hypólito
- Diego Hypólito
- Angélica Ksyvickis
- Bruno David Roma
- Lucélia Santos
- Milena Toscano

== See also ==
- List of municipalities in São Paulo
