= Mikhalakis Skouroumounis =

Cypriot judoka (born 1956)

Personal information
- Nationality: Cypriot
- Born: 16 November 1956 (age 68)
- Occupation: Judoka

Sport
- Sport: Judo

Mikhalakis Skouroumounis (born 16 November 1956) is a Cypriot judoka. He competed in the men's extra-lightweight event at the 1988 Summer Olympics.
