= Badrakhyn Nyamjav =

Mongolian judoka (born 1962)

Personal information
- Nationality: Mongolian
- Born: 20 November 1962 (age 62)

Sport
- Sport: Judo

Badrakhyn Nyamjav (born 20 November 1962) is a Mongolian judoka. He competed in the men's extra-lightweight event at the 1988 Summer Olympics.
