= Guy Delvingt =

French judoka

Personal information
- Nationality: French
- Born: 28 June 1958 (age 66)

Sport
- Sport: Judo

Guy Delvingt (born 28 June 1958) is a French judoka. He competed in the men's extra-lightweight event at the 1984 Summer Olympics.
