= Alberto Francini =

Sammarinese judoka

Personal information
- Nationality: Sammarinese
- Born: 13 July 1958 (age 68)
- Occupation: Judoka
- Height: 168 cm (5 ft 6 in)
- Weight: 60 kg (132 lb)

Sport
- Sport: Judo

Profile at external databases
- IJF: 53477
- JudoInside.com: 10629

Alberto Francini (born 13 July 1958) is a Sammarinese judoka. He competed at the Summer Olympics in 1980, 1984, 1988 and the 1992.

== Sports career ==
began his career in judo representing the Republic of San Marino in the late 1970s and continued to compete internationally for more than a decade.

Francini took part in four consecutive Olympic Games in the extra-lightweight (–60 kg) category:

- Moscow 1980
- Los Angeles 1984
- Seoul 1988
- Barcelona 1992

Although he did not win an Olympic medal, his consistent participation strengthened San Marino’s presence in international judo competitions. He also competed in several European and international tournaments as a representative of the San Marino National Olympic Committee (CONS).
