= Anders Hellqvist =

Swedish judoka

Personal information
- Nationality: Swedish
- Born: 5 December 1963 (age 61); Stockholm, Sweden

Sport
- Sport: Judo

Anders Hellqvist (born 5 December 1963) is a Swedish judoka. He competed in the men's extra-lightweight event at the 1984 Summer Olympics.
