= Helmut Dietz =

German judoka

Personal information
- Born: 26 January 1965 (age 61) Neustadt an der Donau, Germany
- Occupation: Judoka

Sport
- Country: West Germany
- Sport: Judo
- Weight class: ‍–‍60 kg

Achievements and titles
- Olympic Games: 7th (1988)
- World Champ.: 7th (1989)
- European Champ.: (bronze) (1987)
Medal record
Men's judo
Representing West Germany
European Championships
Bronze medal – third place	1987 Paris	‍–‍60 kg

Profile at external databases
- IJF: 53639
- JudoInside.com: 2112
- Updated on 8 July 2024

Helmut Dietz (born 26 January 1965) is a German former judoka. He competed in the men's extra-lightweight event at the 1988 Summer Olympics.
