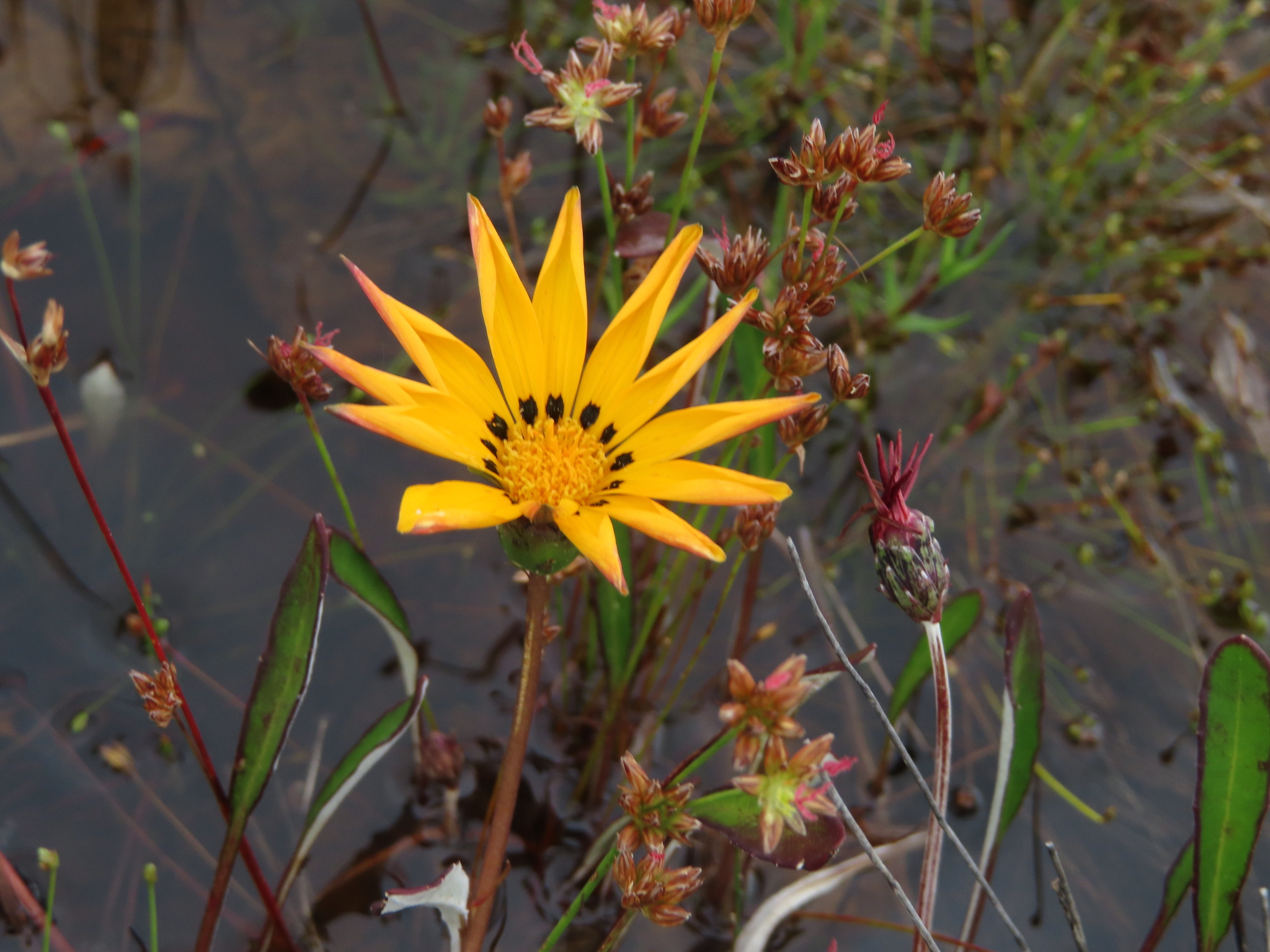

Scientific classification
- Kingdom: Plantae
- Clade: Tracheophytes
- Clade: Angiosperms
- Clade: Eudicots
- Clade: Asterids
- Order: Asterales
- Family: Asteraceae
- Genus: Arctotheca
- Species: A. forbesiana

Binomial name
- Arctotheca forbesiana K.Lewin (1922)

Synonyms
- Cryptostemma forbesianum Harv.; Gazania forbesiana DC.; Gazania subbipinnata DC.

= Arctotheca forbesiana =

Species of plant

Arctotheca forbesiana is a plant belonging to the genus Arctotheca. The species is endemic to the Western Cape and occurs from Malmesbury to Somerset West, Caledon and Elim. The plant is part of the fynbos and renosterveld vegetation. Although the area of occurrence is 4,266 km^{2}, the area of occupation is smaller than 10 km^{2}. The plant has given up large parts of its habitat to crop cultivation and suburban development, especially on the Cape Flats and at the Strand. The subpopulations at Faure, Kraaifontein and Raapenberg have been lost. Low-cost housing is also a threat at Caledon.
