= Renato (footballer, born 1987) =

Brazilian footballer

Personal information
- Full name: Renato Dias Santos
- Date of birth: January 28, 1987 (age 39)
- Place of birth: Santo André, Brazil
- Height: 1.81 m (5 ft 11 in)
- Position: Striker

Team information
- Current team: Atlético-PR

Youth career
- 2000: Juventus-SP

Senior career*
Years	Team	Apps	(Gls)
2001–2004	Santo André		
2004–2009	Atlético-PR		
2009–2011	Santo André		
2011–2012	União Barbarense		
2012–	SV Horn		
- * Club domestic league appearances and goals

Renato Dias Santos (born January 28, 1987, in Santo André), or simply Renato, is a Brazilian striker. He currently plays for SV Horn in Austria.

== Honours ==
- São Paulo State League: 2001
- Paraná State League: 2005
