= Eddy Koaz =

Israeli judoka (born 1959)

Personal information
- Native name: אדי קואז
- Born: 10 May 1959 (age 67)
- Occupation: Judoka

Sport
- Country: Israel
- Sport: Judo
- Weight class: –60 kg

Achievements and titles
- Olympic Games: QF (1984)
- World Champ.: QF (1979)
- European Champ.: 5th (1982)

Profile at external databases
- IJF: 22389
- JudoInside.com: 10729
- Updated on 6 February 2022

Eddy Koaz (Hebrew: אדי קואז; born 10 May 1959) is an Israeli Olympic judoka.

When Koaz competed in the Olympics he was 5 ft 4.5 in (165 cm), and weighed 132 lb (60 kg). He has a younger brother, Shiki, who was also a judoka. He practiced at a dojo in Petah Tikvah, Israel.

Koaz came in tied for third at the British Open London in 1981 in the U60 category, and in the Belgian Open Championships Visé in 1986 in the U65 category. He came in fifth in the 1982 European Championships in the Men's Extra Lightweight (60 kg) category.

Koaz competed for Israel at the 1984 Summer Olympics in Los Angeles in Judo Men's Extra-Lightweight when he was 25 years old. He came in tied for 10th.

Koaz served as President of the Israeli Judo Federation, and as Marketing Director of the European Judo Union.
