= Hugo Goossen =

Surinamese swimmer

Personal information
- Full name: Hugo Goossen
- Born: 15 October 1963 (age 62) Netherlands

Sport
- Sport: Swimming

Hugo Goossen (born 15 October 1963) is a Surinamese former swimmer. He competed in the men's 100 metre backstroke at the 1984 Summer Olympics. He also represented Suriname at the 1982 Central American and Caribbean Games in Havana and at the 1983 Pan American Games in Caracas. Born in the Netherlands, he came to Suriname when he was six months old and spent the next few years in Moengo. In 1969 his family moved to Paramaribo and Goossen joined the 'Dolfijn' swim club. Goossen studied at the Delft University of Technology and later worked as a communications engineer in Qatar.
