= Renato Santos (judoka) =

Portuguese judoka

Personal information
- Nationality: Portuguese
- Born: 13 November 1964 (age 60)

Sport
- Sport: Judo

Renato Santos (born 13 November 1964) is a Portuguese judoka. He competed in the men's extra-lightweight event at the 1988 Summer Olympics.
