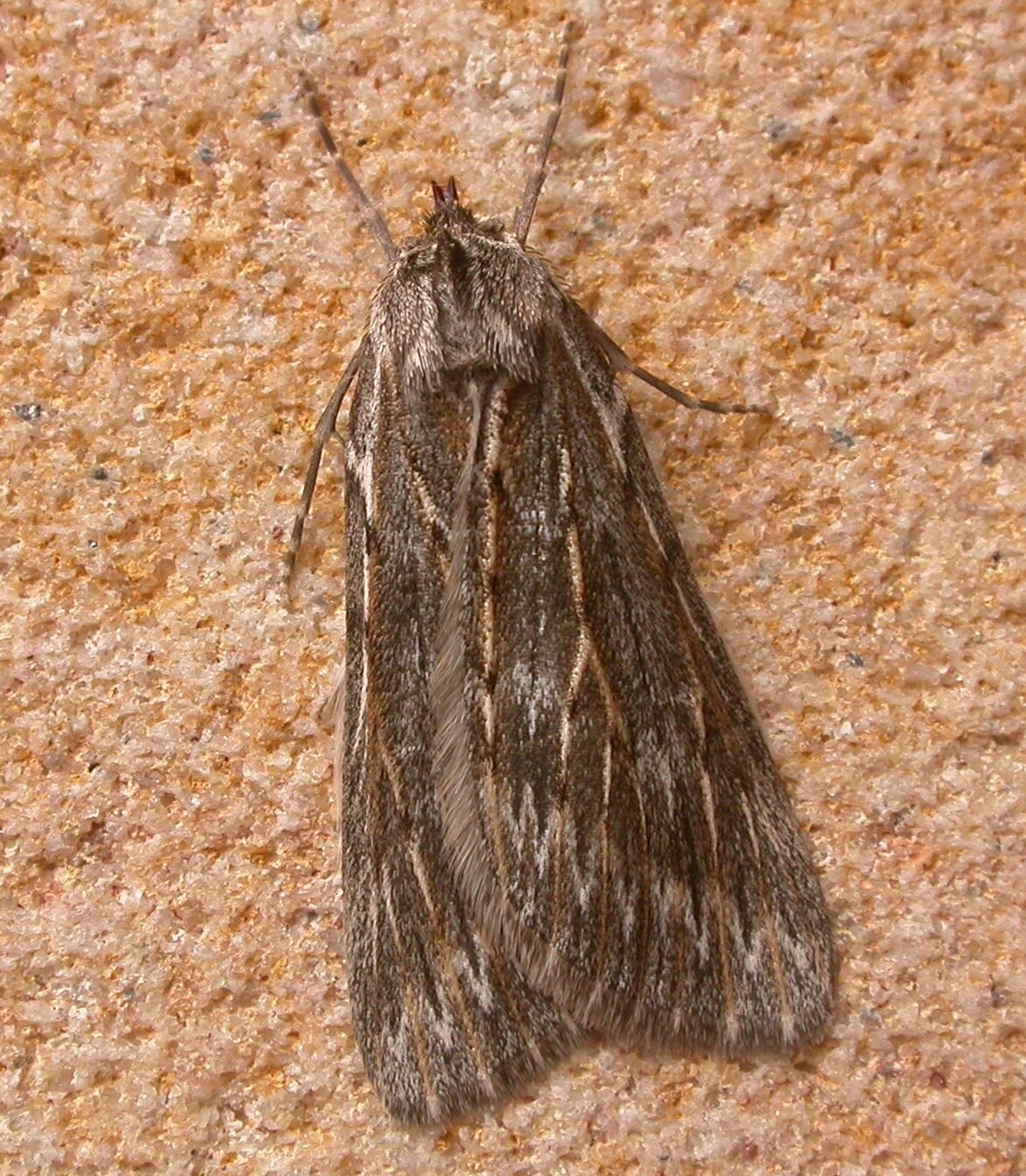
- Ciampa arietaria

Scientific classification
- Kingdom: Animalia
- Phylum: Arthropoda
- Class: Insecta
- Order: Lepidoptera
- Family: Geometridae
- Tribe: Nacophorini
- Genus: Ciampa; Walker, 1863

= Ciampa (moth) =

Genus of moths

Ciampa is a genus of moths in the family Geometridae.

== Species ==
- Ciampa arietaria (Guenée, 1857)
- Ciampa chordota (Meyrick, 1890)
- Ciampa heteromorpha (Lower, 1901)
- Ciampa melanostrepta (Lower, 1893)
