= Petr Šedivák =

Czech judoka

Personal information
- Nationality: Czech
- Born: 13 November 1961 (age 63); Plzeň, Czechoslovakia

Sport
- Sport: Judo

Petr Šedivák (born 13 November 1961) is a Czech judoka. He competed at the 1988 Summer Olympics and the 1992 Summer Olympics.
