= Gino Ciampa =

Australian judoka

Personal information
- Nationality: Australian
- Born: 24 September 1962 (age 62)

Sport
- Sport: Judo

Gino Ciampa (born 24 September 1962) is an Australian judoka. He competed in the men's extra-lightweight event at the 1984 Summer Olympics.
