= João Neves (judoka) =

Portuguese judoka

Personal information
- Nationality: Portuguese
- Born: 6 November 1963 (age 62)

Sport
- Sport: Judo

João Neves (born 6 November 1963) is a Portuguese judoka. He competed in the men's extra-lightweight event at the 1984 Summer Olympics.
