= Pavel Botev =

Bulgarian judoka (born 1963)

Personal information
- Nationality: Bulgarian
- Born: 19 October 1963 (age 63) Sofia, Bulgaria
- Occupation: Judoka

Sport
- Sport: Judo
Medal record
Men's judo
Representing Bulgaria
Universiade
Bronze medal – third place	1985 Kobe	60 kg
European Championships
Bronze medal – third place	1993 Athens	60 kg
Bronze medal – third place	1990 Frankfurt	60 kg

Profile at external databases
- JudoInside.com: 734

Pavel Botev (Bulgarian: Павел Ботев; born 19 October 1963) is a Bulgarian judoka. He competed in the men's extra-lightweight event at the 1988 Summer Olympics.
