= Hristo Botev Stadium =

Hristo Botev Stadium may refer to:

- Hristo Botev Stadium (Blagoevgrad)
- Hristo Botev Stadium (Gabrovo)
- Hristo Botev Stadium (Plovdiv)
- Hristo Botev Stadium (Vratsa)
- Hristo Botev Stadium (Botevgrad)
