= Guno Berenstein =

Dutch judoka (born 1967)

Guno Berenstein (born 18 December 1967 in Nickerie, Suriname) is a Dutch judoka who competed at the 1988 Summer Olympics in the men's extra-lightweight division.
