= Kim Jae-yup =

South Korean judoka (born 1965)

Personal information
- Born: 17 May 1965 (age 61)
- Occupation: Judoka

Korean name
- Hangul: 김재엽
- Hanja: 金載燁
- RR: Gim Jaeyeop
- MR: Kim Chaeyŏp

Sport
- Country: South Korea
- Sport: Judo
- Weight class: –‍60 kg

Achievements and titles
- Olympic Games: (gold) (1988)
- World Champ.: (1987)
- Asian Champ.: (gold) (1986)
Medal record
Men's judo
Representing South Korea
Olympic Games
Gold medal – first place	1988 Seoul	‍–‍60 kg
Silver medal – second place	1984 Los Angeles	‍–‍60 kg
World Championships
Gold medal – first place	1987 Essen	‍–‍60 kg
Asian Games
Gold medal – first place	1986 Seoul	‍–‍60 kg
Asian Championships
Bronze medal – third place	1988 Damascus	‍–‍60 kg
World Juniors Championships
Gold medal – first place	1983 Mayaguez	‍–‍60 kg

Profile at external databases
- IJF: 53634
- JudoInside.com: 6093
- Updated on 6 June 2023

Kim Jae-Yup (born 17 May 1965) is a South Korean retired judoka.

At the age of 19, Kim became runner-up in the extra-lightweight (60 kg) division in the 1984 Summer Olympics, losing to Shinji Hosokawa of Japan, who was the resigning world champion, by ippon.

== History ==
But three years later, Kim went up against Hosokawa in the final again at the World Championship held in Essen, Germany, and avenged the loss, beating by ippon.

In the 1988 Seoul Olympics, Kim finally captured an Olympic gold medal by defeating Kevin Asano of the United States, dominating all the matches without allowing any single point.

He currently serves as a full-time professor at Dong Seoul College in South Korea.
