= Tito Rodrigues =

Surinamese middle-distance runner

Personal information
- Nationality: Surinamese
- Born: 30 December 1965 (age 60) Suriname
- Height: 168 cm (5 ft 6 in)
- Weight: 68 kg (150 lb)

Sport
- Country: Suriname
- Sport: Middle-distance running

Tito Rodrigues is a Suriname Olympic middle-distance runner. He represented his country in the men's 1500 meters at the 1984 Summer Olympics. His time was a 4:02.87 in the first heat.
