= Shinji Hosokawa =

Japanese judoka (born 1960)

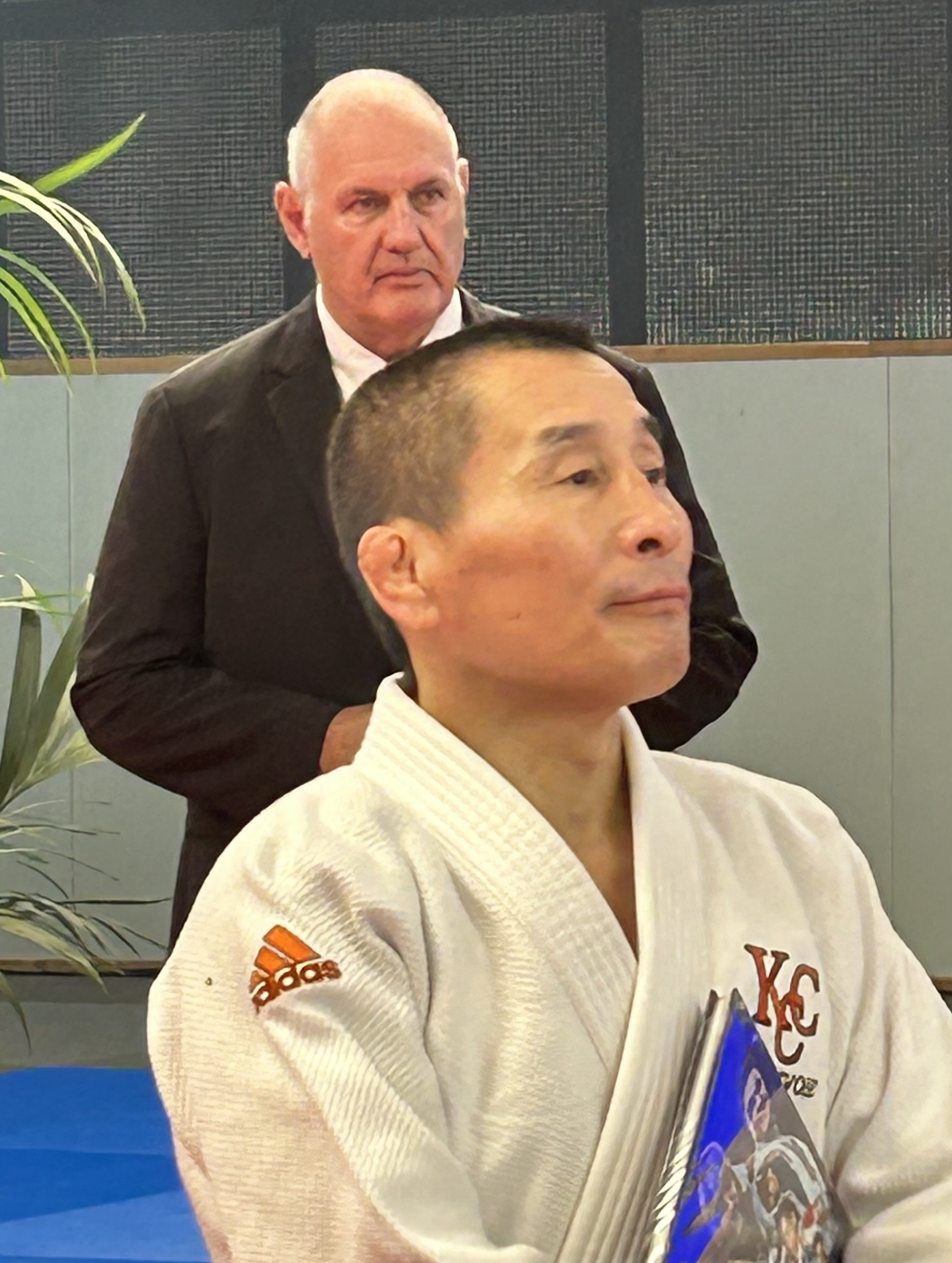

Personal information
- Born: 2 January 1960 (age 66)
- Occupation: Judoka

Sport
- Country: Japan
- Sport: Judo
- Weight class: ‍‍–‍60 kg

Achievements and titles
- Olympic Games: (gold) (1984)
- World Champ.: (gold) (1985)
Medal record
Men's judo
Representing Japan
Olympic Games
Gold medal – first place	1984 Los Angeles	‍–‍60 kg
Bronze medal – third place	1988 Seoul	‍–‍60 kg
World Championships
Gold medal – first place	1985 Seoul	‍–‍60 kg
Silver medal – second place	1987 Essen	‍–‍60 kg

Profile at external databases
- IJF: 14358
- JudoInside.com: 5379
- Updated on 6 June 2023

Shinji Hosokawa (細川伸二, Hosokawa Shinji; born on 2 January 1960 in Ichinomiya, Hyogo, Japan) is a Japanese retired judoka who won two Olympic medals during the 1980s.

== Biography ==
Hosokawa began judo in junior-high school, and won the Japanese inter-high school judo competition in 1977. He entered Tenri University in 1978, and continued his success by winning the college-level world judo championship in 1979 and 1980.

After graduating from Tenri University, he began work as a teacher for a school in Nara Prefecture in 1982. He was chosen as the -60 kg representative for the Japanese olympic judo team for the 1984 Summer Olympics, where he won a gold medal by defeating future gold medalist Kim Jae-Yup only 69 seconds into the match. He also won a gold medal at the 1985 World Judo Championships, but retired to concentrate on his work as a teacher. He restarted his judo career in 1987 with a silver medal at the 1987 World Judo Championships, and retired after finishing with a bronze medal at the 1988 Summer Olympics.

Hosokawa has served as an instructor for the Japanese Olympic Committee since April, 1997, where he coached many lightweight judoka, most notably 3-time gold medalist Tadahiro Nomura, whose father was Hosokawa's coach during high school. He also coaches judo at Tenri University, and for the All Japan Judo Federation.

== See also ==
- List of judoka
- List of Olympic medalists in judo
