= Lee Kan =

Hong Kong judoka

Personal information
- Nationality: Hong Konger
- Born: 22 February 1962 (age 63)

Sport
- Sport: Judo

Lee Kan (born 22 February 1962) is a Hong Kong judoka. He competed at the 1988 Summer Olympics and the 1992 Summer Olympics.
