= Edward Liddie =

American judoka (born 1959)

Personal information
- Born: July 24, 1959 (age 67) Union City, Georgia, U.S.
- Occupation: Judoka

Sport
- Country: United States
- Sport: Judo
- Weight class: ‍–‍60 kg

Achievements and titles
- Olympic Games: (bronze) (1984)
- World Champ.: 5th (1983, 1989)
Medal record
Men's judo
Representing United States
Olympic Games
Bronze medal – third place	1984 Los Angeles	‍–‍60 kg
Pan American Games
Silver medal – second place	1979 San Juan	‍–‍60 kg
Bronze medal – third place	1991 Havana	‍–‍60 kg

Profile at external databases
- IJF: 786
- JudoInside.com: 6012
- Updated on 19 June 2023

Edward J. "Ed" Liddie (born 21 July 1959 in Union City, Georgia) is an American former judoka. He represented his native country at the 1984 Summer Olympics in Los Angeles, California and was a bronze medalist in the men's extra-lightweight division (‍–‍60 kg). He also won judo medals at the Pan American Games in 1979 and 1991. He graduated from Cumberland College in 1983. He teaches at the United States Olympic Training Center in Colorado Springs, Colorado. He was named as a finalist for the USOC Paralympic Coach of the Year in 2013. He served as a coach for some Olympic judoka such as Taraje Williams-Murray.
