= Peter Jupke =

German judoka

Personal information
- Nationality: German
- Born: 3 June 1957 (age 67); Ingolstadt, Germany
- Occupation: Judoka

Sport
- Sport: Judo

Profile at external databases
- JudoInside.com: 4826

Peter Jupke (born 3 June 1957) is a German judoka. He competed in the men's extra-lightweight event at the 1984 Summer Olympics.
