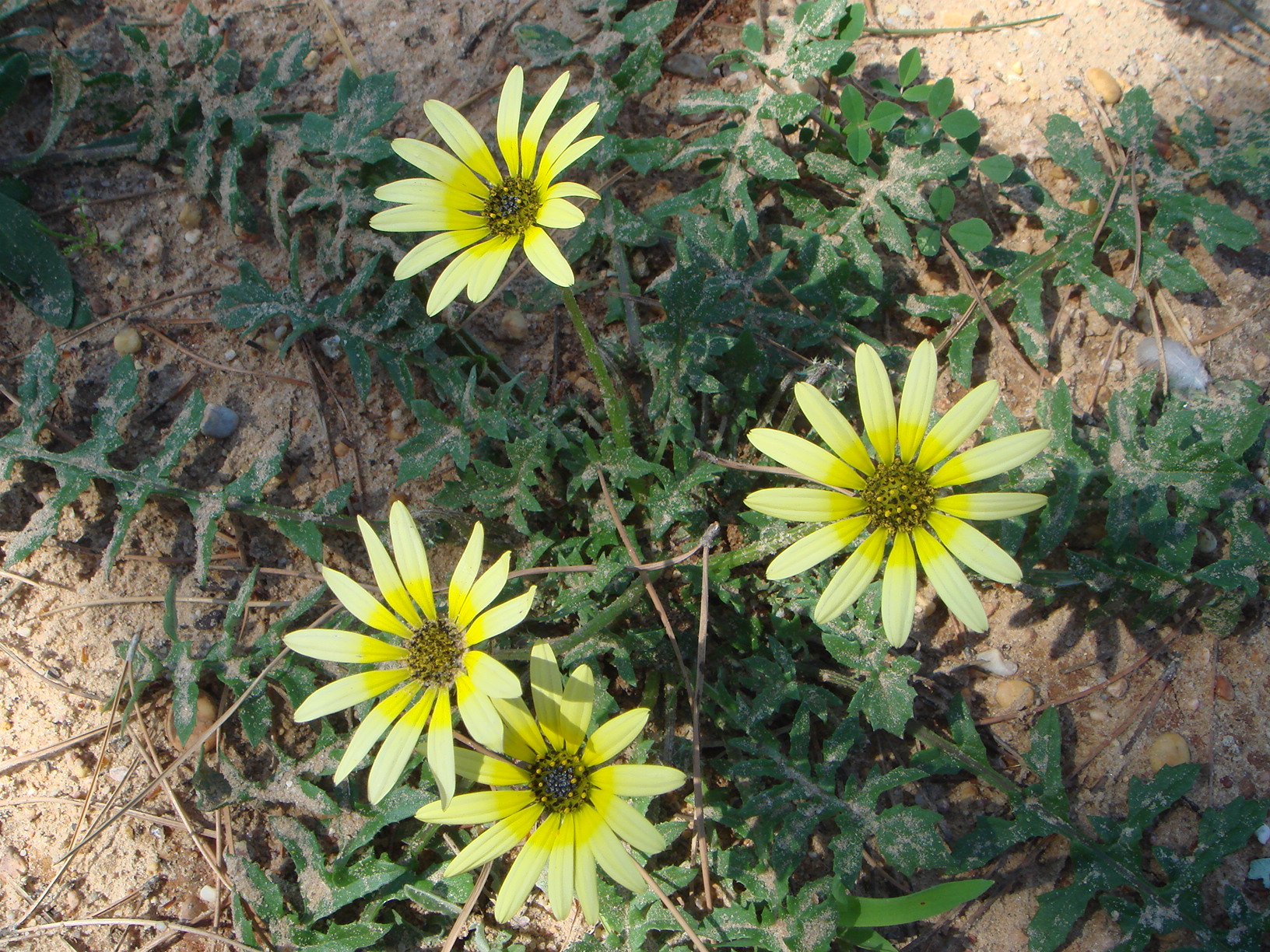

Scientific classification
- Kingdom: Plantae
- Clade: Tracheophytes
- Clade: Angiosperms
- Clade: Eudicots
- Clade: Asterids
- Order: Asterales
- Family: Asteraceae
- Genus: Arctotheca
- Species: A. calendula

Binomial name
- Arctotheca calendula (L.) Levyns

Synonyms
- Synonymy: Alloiozonium arctotideum Kunze; Arctotheca calendulacea (L.) K.Lewin; Arctotheca calendulaceum K.Lewin; Arctotis calendula L.; Arctotis calendulacea L.; Arctotis hypochondriaca Willd.; Arctotis speciosa Salisb.; Arctotis sulphurea Gaertn.; Arctotis superba L.; Arctotis tristis L.; Cryptostemma calendula (L.) Druce; Cryptostemma calendulaceum (L.) R.Br.; Cryptostemma hypochondriacum R.Br.; Cryptostemma runcinatum R.Br.; Cryptostemma triste (L.) Domin; Cynotis hypochondriaca Hoffmanns

= Arctotheca calendula =

Species of plant

Arctotheca calendula is a plant in the sunflower family commonly known as capeweed, plain treasureflower, cape dandelion, or cape marigold because it occurs in the Western Cape Province in South Africa. It has a wide distribution in coastal areas of South Africa, extending from Namaqualand to Cape Point and as far as KwaZulu-Natal.

== Description ==
Arctotheca calendula is a squat perennial or annual herb which grows in rosettes and sends out stolons and can spread across the ground quickly. The leaves are covered with white woolly hairs, especially on their undersides. The leaves are lobed or deeply toothed, arranged in a basal rosette and distributed along the stem, are divided into a petiole and a leaf blade. The leaf blade is 5 to 25 centimeters long and 2 to 5 centimeters wide, with the uppermost almost simple and obovate; the lower ones are pinnately lobed to lyre-shaped. The upper surface of the leaf is finely hairy, cobweb-like, and the underside is densely covered with white, tomentose or woolly hairs.

The name 'Actotheca' comes from Greek words 'arktos' meaning 'a bear', and 'theke', which translates to 'a capsule' (or a 'case'); referring to the heavily fuzzy fruits. The species name 'calendula' may refer to its resemblance to the European genus Calendula that means 'little calendar', which derives from the Greek word 'kalendae', meaning 'the first day of the month', and could refer to its long-flowering span.

=== Inflorescence ===
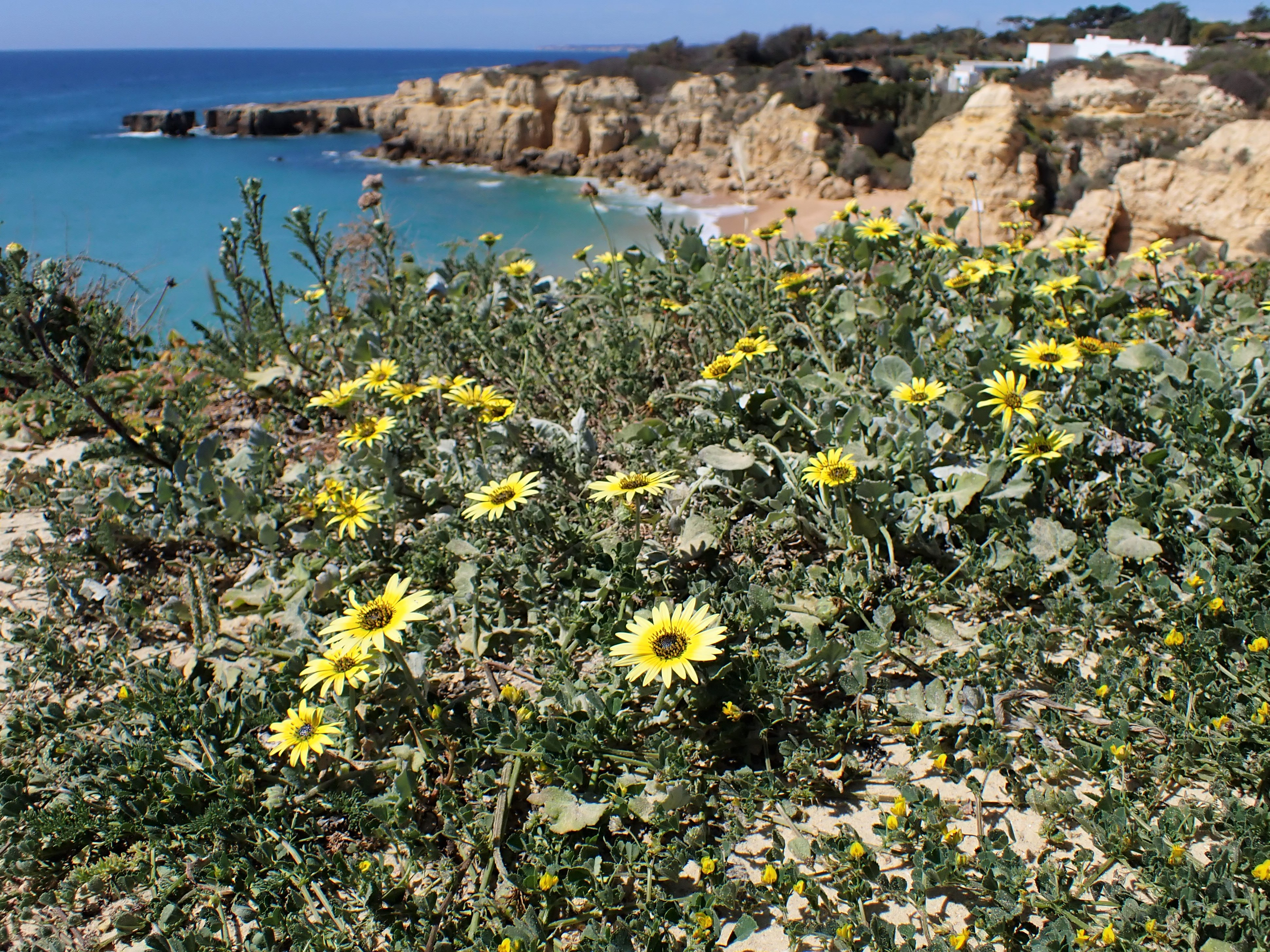
Groundcover with flowers

Hairy stems bear daisy-like flowers with small yellow petals that sometimes have a green or purple tint surrounded by white or yellow ray petals extending further out from the flower centers. The flower heads are located on leaf-axillary inflorescence stalks that are usually 15 to 20 (10 to 25) centimeters long. The hemispherical involucrum with a diameter of about 1.5 centimeters consists of several rows of bracts.

The flower heads have a diameter of about 5, 2.5 to 4, rarely up to 6 centimeters. There are fewer than 20 (6 to 13, rarely up to 17) ray florets in a flower head. The approximately 3 millimeter long achenes are pinkish-brown and covered with silky, woolly hairs. The flowering period in South Africa is in winter, spring to early summer and extends from July to November. In southern Europe, however, the flowering period is March to June.

== Cultivation ==
It is cultivated as an attractive ornamental groundcover but has invasive potential when introduced to a new area. Growing best in full sun and hardy to moderate frost, the plant can reproduce vegetatively or via seed. Seed-bearing plants are most likely to become weedy, taking hold most easily in bare or sparsely vegetated soil or disturbed areas.

== Distribution ==
Arctotheca calendula is native to southern Africa in Lesotho and in the South African provinces of KwaZulu-Natal, Eastern Cape, Northern Cape and Western Cape, where it thrives in Namaqualand, the Karoo and as far as the Cape Peninsula, where it is found in coastal areas on ruderal sandy soils, along roadsides, on old farmland, and on disturbed sites.

It is naturalized in California, Spain, Portugal, Italy, Australia, New Zealand, and Chile, and considered a noxious weed in some of those places.
