= Christian Nkamgang =

Cameroonian judoka

Personal information
- Nationality: Cameroonian
- Born: 27 October 1965 (age 59)

Sport
- Sport: Judo

Christian Nkamgang (born 27 October 1965) is a Cameroonian judoka. He competed in the men's extra-lightweight event at the 1984 Summer Olympics.
