= Zhang Guojun =

Chinese judoka (born 1963)

Personal information
- Full name: simplified Chinese: 张国君; traditional Chinese: 張國軍; pinyin: Zhāng Guójūn
- Nationality: Chinese
- Born: 5 March 1963 (age 62)

Sport
- Sport: Judo

Zhang Guojun (born 5 March 1963) is a Chinese judoka. He competed at the 1984 Summer Olympics and the 1988 Summer Olympics.
