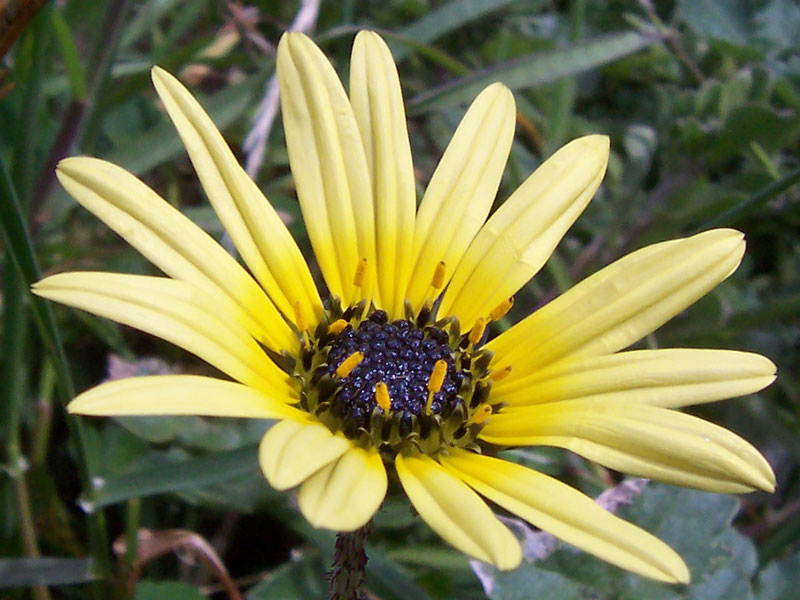
- Arctotheca calendula

Scientific classification
- Kingdom: Plantae
- Clade: Tracheophytes
- Clade: Angiosperms
- Clade: Eudicots
- Clade: Asterids
- Order: Asterales
- Family: Asteraceae
- Subfamily: Vernonioideae
- Tribe: Arctotideae
- Subtribe: Arctotidinae
- Genus: Arctotheca; Vaill.

Synonyms
- Cryptostemma R.Br. ex R.Br.; Alloiozonium Kunze; Cynotis Hoffmanns.; Arctotis sect. Arctotheca (Wendl.) Baillon.

= Arctotheca =

Genus of plants

Arctotheca /ˌɑːrktoʊˈθiːkə/ is a small genus of flowering plants in the family Asteraceae. They are annuals or perennials native to southern Africa. It is becoming an invasive weed in other parts of the world.

== Species ==
The following is a list of the accepted species and their native countries:

- Arctotheca calendula (L.) Levyns — Cape Provinces, Free State, KwaZulu-Natal, Lesotho
- Arctotheca forbesiana K.Lewin — Cape Provinces
- Arctotheca marginata Beyers — Northern Cape
- Arctotheca populifolia (P.J.Bergius) Norl. — Cape Provinces, KwaZulu-Natal, Mozambique
- Arctotheca prostrata Britten — Cape Provinces, Namibia
