= Goos (disambiguation) =

Goos is a commune in France.

Goos may also refer to:

- Goos (name), a masculine given name and derived patronymic surname
- Goos Lake, in Schleswig-Holstein, Germany
- Global Ocean Observing System

== See also ==
- Goose (disambiguation)
- Goosen, Goossens, other forms of the surname
- Goss (disambiguation)
