= Goss (surname) =

Goss is a Saxon surname meaning "goose" (from Gos, a goose). Notable people with the surname include:

- Alexander Goss (1814–1872), English bishop
- Andrew Goss ( Born 1958), English Automotive expert. CEO Porsche GB, Global Sales Director Jaguar Land Rover
- Antonio Goss (born 1966), American football player and coach
- Bob Goss (born 1898), Texas Ranger
- Belinda Goss (born 1984), Australian cyclist
- Chris Goss (born 1959), American record producer and musician
- Eleanor Goss (1895–1982), American tennis player
- Ephraim Goss (1806–1877), New York politician
- Francis P. Goss (1879–1973), Washington politician
- Fred Goss (born 1961), American television actor and director
- Freddie Goss, American basketball player and coach
- George Goss (1893–1967), English naval officer and football manager
- Iannis Goss, English Interior Designer & conservationist in London
- Indigo Goss (born 1987), English fashion model
- James Goss (disambiguation), several people
- Jeremy Goss (born 1965), Welsh international footballer
- Joe Goss (1838–1885), English boxer
- John Goss (1894-1953), English baritone
- John Goss (composer) (1800–1880), English organist and composer
- John Goss (racing driver) (born 1943), Australian racing driver
- Kelli Goss (born 1992), American film and television actress
- Kennedy Goss (born 1996), Canadian swimmer
- Kieran Goss (born 1962), Northern Irish contemporary singer-songwriter
- Kimberly Goss (born 1978), Korean-American singer
- Luke Goss (born 1968), English actor and drummer
- Linda Goss, American storyteller
- Linda Goss, Royal Ballet teacher
- Matt Goss (born 1968), English singer-songwriter and musician
- Matthew Goss (born 1986), Australian cyclist
- Norm Goss Jr. (born 1951), former Australian rules footballer
- Norm Goss Sr. (1915–1983), former Australian rules footballer
- Norman P. Goss (1906–1977), American inventor and researcher
- Olga May Goss (1916–1994), Australian plant pathologist
- Pat Goss, American automotive expert and radio/television personality
- Pearl Goss, Indian badminton player
- Pete Goss (born 1960s), British yachtsman
- Porter Goss (born 1938), American politician
- Rebecca Goss (poet) (born 1974), English poet
- Rebecca Goss (chemist) (born 1976), British Bioorganic chemist/chemical biologist
- Ricardo Goss (born 1994) South African footballer
- Richard Goss (Irish republican), (1915-1941), executed Irish Republican
- Sandy Goss (born 1968), Canadian swimmer
- Sarah Goss (born 1992), New Zealand rugby union player
- Sean Goss (born 1995), German-English footballer
- Stephen Goss (born 1964), Welsh composer and guitarist
- Stephen S. Goss (1961-2019), American judge
- Steve Goss (1949-2015), American politician and reverend
- Theodora Goss (born 1968), American writer
- Tim Goss (born 1963), British motor racing engineer
- Tom Goss (disambiguation), several people
- Wayne Goss (1951–2014), Australian politician and former Queensland Premier
- William Henry Goss (1833–1906), English porcelain manufacturer
- Woody Goss, American musician
- Zoe Goss (born 1968), Australian cricketer

== Characters ==
- Ian Goss, from Blue Heelers

== See also ==
- Gosse
