= Goss =

Goss may refer to:

== Places ==
- Goss, Georgia, a place in Georgia, United States
- Goss, Mississippi, United States
- Goss, Missouri, United States
- Göss Abbey (Stift Göß), Leoben, Austria
- Goss Moor, Cornwall, United Kingdom
- Goss Stadium at Coleman Field, Oregon State University, United States

== Other uses ==
- Goss (surname)
- Goss crested china, a brand of porcelain
- Goss International, a former printing press manufacturer, now part of Manroland
- The Goss Ministry of the government of Queensland, Australia
- Goss v. Lopez, U.S. Supreme Court case
- Goss zeta function in mathematics
- Short for Gossamer (fabric), the traditional material used for the body of a top hat
- Short for gossip
- GOSS, ICAO code for Saint-Louis Airport

== See also ==
- Government of Southern Sudan (1972–1983)
- Government of Southern Sudan (2005–2011)
- Government of South Sudan (since 2011)
- Justice Goss (disambiguation)
- GOS (disambiguation)
