= Robert Allen Norris =

American ornithologist and botanist (1922–2010)

- Born: December 16, 1922; Waycross, Georgia, U.S.
- Died: September 5, 2010 (aged 87); Americus, Georgia, U.S.
- Education: University of Georgia, B.S. (1948), M.S. (1949); University of California, Berkeley, Ph.D. (1954)
- Scientific career
- Fields: Ornithology, Botany
- Thesis: A Comparative Study of the Nuthatches, Sitta Pygmaea and Sitta Pusilla (1954)
- Doctoral advisor: Alden H. Miller and Frank A. Pitelka

Robert Allen Norris (16 December 1922 – 5 September 2010) was an American ornithologist. After service in the U.S. Navy during World War II, he graduated from the University of Georgia with a Master of Science degree in 1949. He then entered the University of California, Berkeley, where he earned Ph.D. in 1954. In 1958, he became the full-time resident ecologist at the Savannah River Plant in Georgia. In later life he became interested in botany and assembled a herbarium with 10,000 specimens of southern Georgia plants. He donated this to Georgia Southwestern State University, and became its curator.

== Biography ==
Robert Allen Norris was born on December 16, 1922, in Waycross, Georgia, the son of Robert P. and Nell Marie Norris. While his father's job with the state highway department required the family to moved frequently, he spent most of his childhood in Tifton and Fitzgerald, Georgia. Norris formed lasting friendships with fellow bird enthusiasts Milton N. Hopkins and David W. Johnston. The trio shared a deep interest in ornithology and became involved with the Georgia Ornithological Society, where they connected with influential figures such as Herbert L. Stoddard, the organization's founding president. Norris published his first paper in the Georgia Ornithological Society's journal, The Oriole, when he was 16, and he had a paper published in The Auk, the journal of the American Ornithological Society at age 18.

After graduating from Fitzgerald High School, Norris briefly attended Abraham Baldwin Agricultural College in Tifton, then began his studies at the University of Georgia in 1942. His academic studies were put on hold due to World War II, during which he spent three years in the U.S. Navy, serving in the Pacific, including participating in the 1945 Battle of Okinawa.

After the war ended, he was discharged from the Navy in 1946 and returned to the University of Georgia to complete his studies. He graduated with his Bachelor of Science degree in 1948, and his Master of Science degree the following year, writing a thesis on the Distribution and Populations of Summer Birds in Southwestern Georgia under the supervision of Eugene P. Odum. He then entered the University of California, Berkeley, where he earned Ph.D. in 1954, writing his dissertation on the brown-headed nuthatch (Sitta pusilla) from the southeastern United States and the pygmy nuthatch (Sitta pygmaea), which is found in the western United States. He subsequently described his dissertation as "A Tale of Two Sittas".

A tale of two sittas

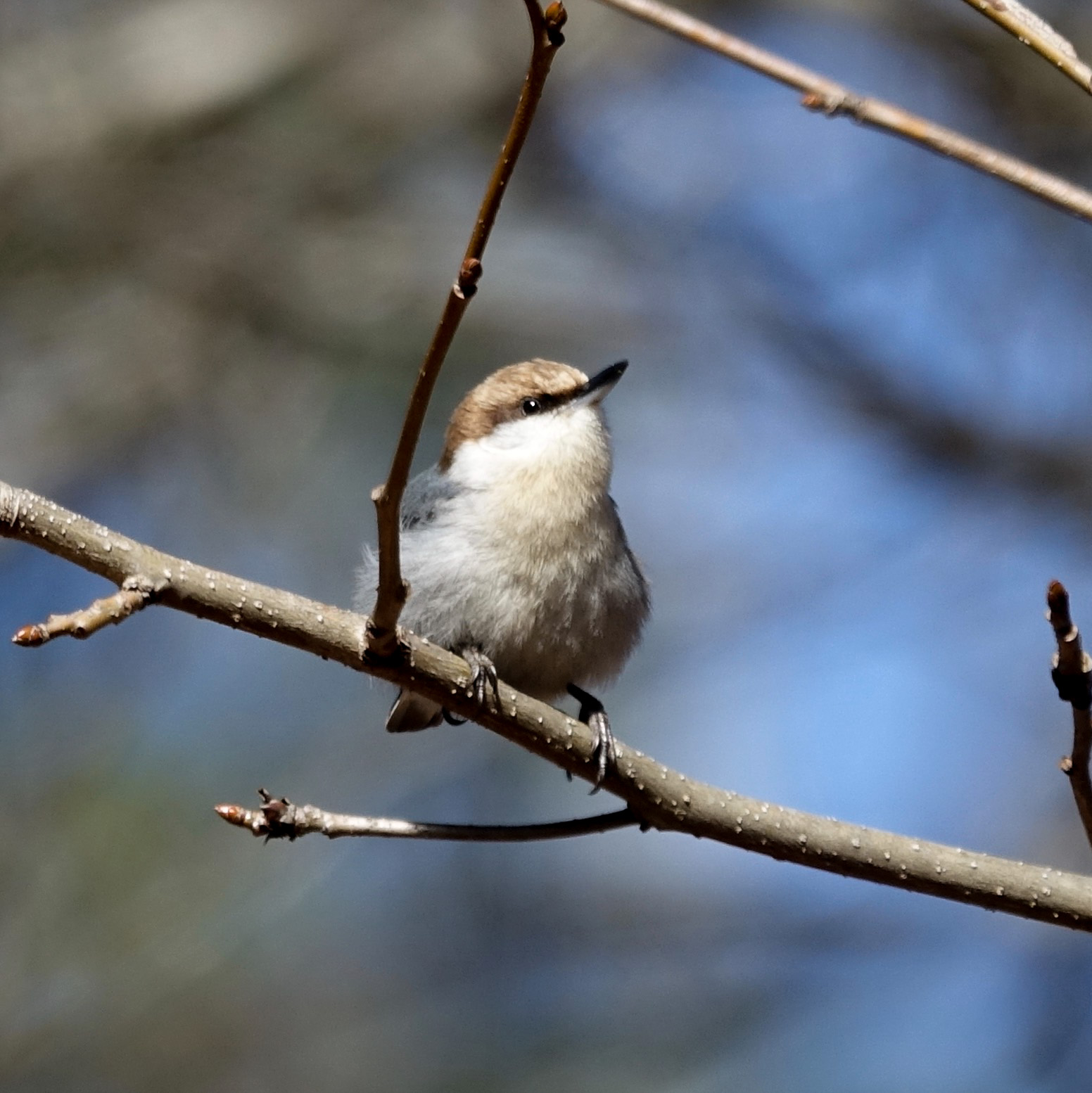
Brown-headed nuthatch (Sitta pusilla)

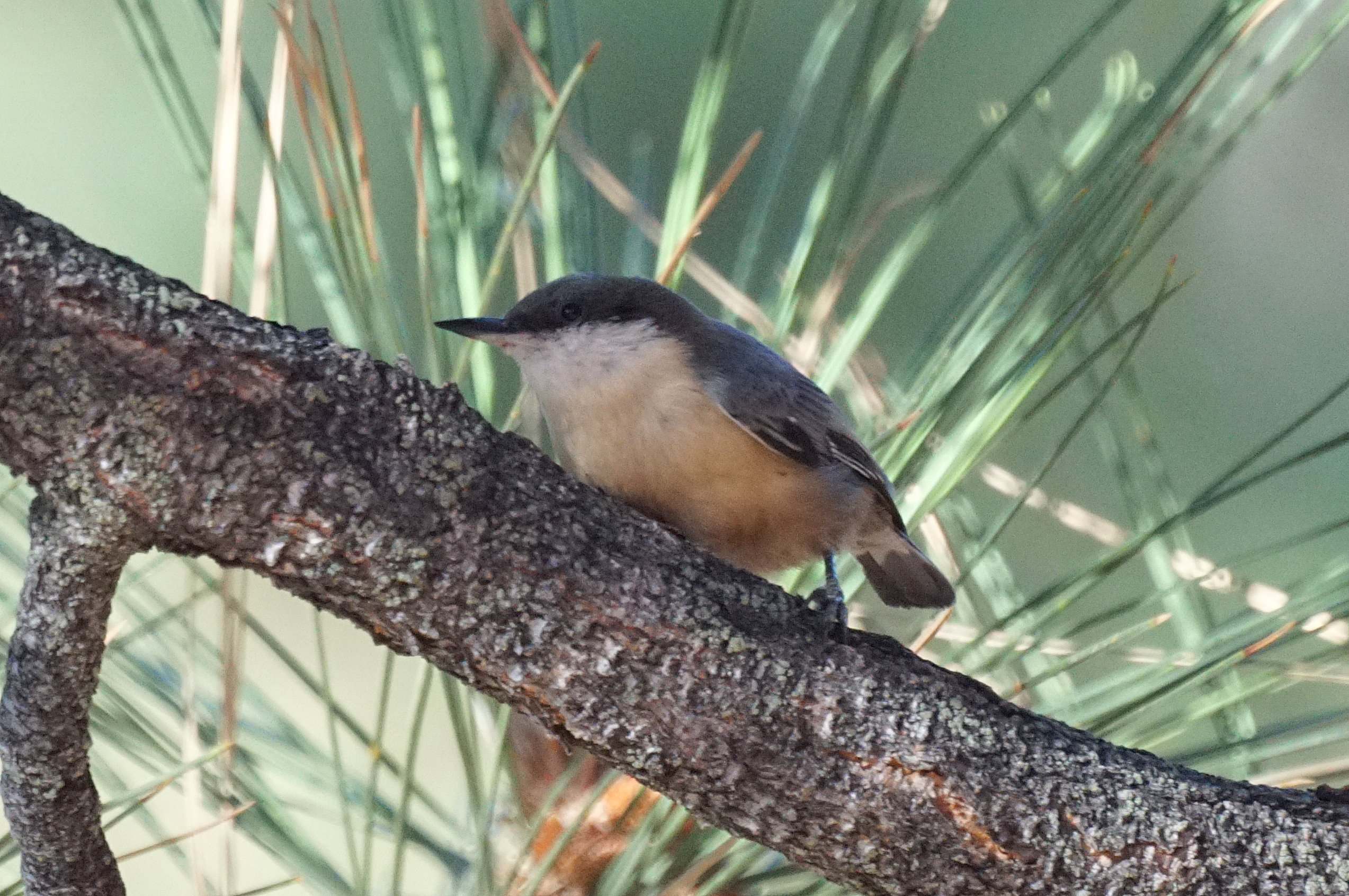
Pygmy nuthatch (Sitta pygmaea)

While in California, Norris also wrote a 51-page chapter on the "Physiographic & Biogeographic Regions of Georgia with Special Reference to the Distribution of Breeding Birds" for Thomas D. Burleigh's book on Georgia Birds. After teaching at Rutgers University for a year, Norris accepted an offer from Odum to become the full-time resident ecologist at the Savannah River Plant, an 81,000-hectare (200,000-acre) facility in Georgia that produced plutonium and tritium for nuclear weapons. He studied bird populations there, particularly the Savannah sparrow (Passerculus sandwichensis). He was awarded the Ecological Society of America's Mercer Award for 1961 for his research paper on "Density, racial composition, sociality, and selective predation in nonbreeding populations of Savannah sparrows". He left the Savannah River Plant in 1958 and briefly taught at Tulane University and the Louisiana State University.

Norris returned to California, where he worked in a blood bank. He used the knowledge he gained there to study the blood of birds, with the objective of being able to categorize avian taxonomy through blood groups. In 1962, Stoddard hired him to assist him at the Tall Timbers Research Station with a study of the impact of birds on the WCTV tower in Florida. This gave Norris access to blood samples from scores of birds. Norris published his results in 1963, but they were inconclusive. The idea of using biochemical analysis to determine the avian phylogenetic tree was a good one, but blood sampling was too crude; in subsequent decades DNA sampling would be employed to great effect. He climbed the transmission tower to install a mist net designed to help determine the altitude at which birds such as the Ruby-throated hummingbird (Archilochus colubris) fly during their nocturnal migration. He was able to determine the age of a Pine warbler (Setophaga pinus) by counting the barbs on its tail feathers under a microscope.

In 1966, Norris left the Tall Timbers Research Station to teach at Valdosta State College. He became interested in botany and assembled a herbarium with 10,000 specimens of southern Georgia plants. He donated this to Georgia Southwestern State University, and became its curator. Although botany became his passion in later life, he continued to submit articles on birds to The Oriole.

Norris died at the Phoebe Sumter Medical Center in Americus, Georgia, on September 5, 2010. His wife Vivian had died before him.
