= GOS =

GOS may refer to:

== Animals ==
- Gos (bird)
- Gloucestershire Old Spots, a pig breed

== Government ==
- Government Offices for the English Regions (GOs)
- Government of Sindh, Pakistan

== Places ==
- Gos (Fils), a river in Germany
- Grange-over-Sands railway station, England (GBR:GOS)
- Green Oasis School, Shenzhen, China
- Somersby Airfield, Australia (IATA:GOS)

== Science and technology ==
=== Computing ===
- gOS (operating system), a deprecated Linux distribution
- GrapheneOS, a secure mobile operating system
- Grid-oriented storage

=== Chemicals ===
- Gadolinium oxysulfide, an inorganic compound
- Galactooligosaccharide, carbohydrates found in milk

=== Ecology ===
- Georgia Ornithological Society, United States
- Global Ocean Sampling Expedition, a marine microbial study

=== Medicine ===
- Glasgow Outcome Scale, for cerebral trauma
- General ophthalmic services, for eye care

=== Telecommunication ===
- Geographical Operations System, mapping and database software for telecommunications companies
- Grade of service, a measure of voice service quality

=== Other uses in science ===
- Galactic O star catalogue, in astronomy

== Other uses ==
- Gronings dialect of Low German (ISO 639-3 language code:gos)
- Gross operating surplus, the surplus due to owners of incorporated businesses
