= Department of Agriculture and Food =

Department of Agriculture and Food may refer to:

- Department of Agriculture and Food (Western Australia), former name of Department of Primary Industries and Regional Development
- Department of Agriculture and Food (Ireland), former name of Department of Agriculture, Food and the Marine
