= Milton Hopkins =

Milton Hopkins may refer to:

- Milton Hopkins (biologist) (1906–1983), professor of biology
- Milton N. Hopkins (1926–2007), American farmer, conservationist, naturalist, and author from Georgia
- Milton W. Hopkins (1789–1844), American portrait painter in the folk art tradition
