= Geus =

Geus or GEUS may refer to:

== People ==
- Armin Geus (born 1937), German historian
- Jacques Geus (1920–1991), Belgian racing cyclist
- Rob Geus (born 1971), Dutch cook and TV presenter

== Other uses ==
- Geus, a Dutch type of jack flag
- Geological Survey of Denmark and Greenland, GEUS, a research institute
- Geus River, Guam

== See also ==
- GEU (disambiguation)
- De Geus, a Dutch surname
