= Goossens =

Goossens is a Dutch-language patronymic surname meaning "son of Goos/Goossen" (Goswin). It is the 8th most common name in Belgium. Notable people with the surname include:

- Adolphe Goossens (1896–1916), Horn player who died in action at the Somme, aged 20
- Albert Goossens (1887–before 1947), operatic baritone active in Belgium and Australia
- Ben Goossens (born 1985), Belgian ad agency art director and photomontage artist
- Carry Goossens (born 1953), Belgian actor and comedian
- Colette Goossens (born 1942), Belgian swimmer
- Daniel Goossens, (born 1954), French cartoonist
- Dennis Goossens (born 1993), Belgian gymnast
- Ellen Goossens (living), Belgian biomedical scientist
- Ester Goossens (born 1972), Dutch middle-distance runner
- Eugène Goossens, père (1845–1906), Belgian conductor
- Eugène Goossens, fils (1867–1958), French conductor and violinist, son of Eugène Goossens, père
- Eugene Aynsley Goossens (1893–1962), English conductor and composer, son of Eugène Goossens, fils
- Hanne Goossens (born 1992), Belgian chess player
- Jan Goossens (born 1930), Belgian dialectologist and philologist
- Jan Goossens (born 1958), Dutch-born American indoor soccer player
- Jean-Maurice Goossens (1892–1965), Belgian ice hockey player
- John Goossens (born 1988), Dutch footballer
- John J. Goossens (1944–2002), Belgian businessman
- Kris Goossens (born 1974), Belgian tennis player
- Lou Goossens (born 2009), Belgian actor
- Léon Goossens (1897–1988), British oboist, son of Eugène Goossens, fils
- Marc Goossens (cyclist) (born 1958), Belgian racing cyclist
- Marc Goossens (born 1969), Belgian racecar driver
- Marie Goossens (1894–1991), English harpist, older sister of Sidonie Goossens
- Michaël Goossens (born 1973), Belgian footballer
- Pierre-Lambert Goossens (1827–1906), Belgian Cardinal of the Roman Catholic Church
- Ray Goossens (1924–1998), Flemish artist, animator and director
- Reinhilde Goossens (born 1961), Belgian singer known by the name "Lisa del Bo"
- Robert Goossens (1927–2016), French jewelry maker
- Roland Goossens (born 1937), Belgian comics artist known as "Gos"
- Sidonie Goossens (1899–2004), British harpist, daughter of Eugène Goossens, fils
- Simon Goossens (1893–1964), Belgian sculptor
- Victor Goossens, founder and co-owner of the multiregional professional esports organization Team Liquid

== See also ==
- Goosen, form of surname most common in South Africa
- Goossen, another form of the surname
- Mount Goossens, named after the Belgian photographer Leon Goossens
