= Goossen =

Goossen is a Dutch surname, meaning "son of Goos/Goossen" ("Goswin"). Notable people with this name include:

- Duane Goossen, American politician
- Eugene Goossen (1921–1997), American art critic and art historian
- Greg Goossen (1945–2011), American baseball player
- Hugo Goossen (born 1960s), Surinamese swimmer
- Jan Goossen (1937–2005), Dutch sculptor
- Jeananne Goossen (born 1985), Canadian actress
- Matthias Goossen (born 1992), Canadian football player
- Nicholaus Goossen (born 1978), American director and photographer
- Pol Goossen (born 1949), Flemish film and television actor
- Steve Goossen (born 1968), Dutch footballer

As a given name

- Goossen van der Weyden (ca. 1465– aft. 1538), Flemish painter

== See also ==
- Goosen
- Goossens
