= Olga May Goss =

Australian plant pathologist (1916–1994)

- Born: 1916; Perth
- Died: 1994 (aged 77–78)
- Education: University of Western Australia (BSc)
- Scientific career
- Workplaces: Western Australia Department of Agriculture

Olga May Goss (1916–1994) was an Australian plant pathologist. Her research made the Australian agricultural industry more resilient through discoveries on plant diseases.

== Education ==
Goss was born in Perth in 1916. She was the elder of two daughters. Her parents had received little formal education, but they encouraged Goss's interest in biological sciences. In her teens, she was given a microscope and began to examine small specimens.

Goss was academically gifted and won a scholarship to attend a good high school. In 1934, she won the statewide Science Exhibition to attend the University of Western Australia. She graduated in 1937 with First Class Honours. During her studies, she assisted in research work on cormorant parasites, translating relevant documents from German to English.

== Career ==
In 1938, Goss was appointed Laboratory Assistant at the University of Western Australia. She worked in undergraduate labs and performed parasitology research. In 1939, she became a Demonstrator; this increased her teaching load and left her with little time for research.

In 1943, she was hired at the Princess Margaret Hospital for Children as a Pathologist. Around this time, she became ill and was unable to walk for two years. She spent months in hospital. Hoping to find a new position away from the hospital to limit her infection risk, Goss came into contact with the Western Australia Department of Agriculture, where she was offered work in plant pathology. Service personnel returning to Australia after the Second World War were interested in agricultural work, and the department was responsible for assisting these new growers.

Goss worked at the Western Australia Department of Agriculture from 1945 to 1980. Her final role was as Senior Plant Pathologist. She developed expertise, especially concerning nematodes. As a woman, Goss was paid less than her male counterparts despite her expertise. She was also restricted in her ability to perform official field visits. Among her first successes were treatments to reduce bacterial canker in tomatoes and apple scab. She tracked the movement of infections due to importation. She also established nitrifying rhizobia in the region. She later performed a study of nematodes in Australia and discovered that many crop diseases were due to nematodes attacking roots and could be treated with fumigants.

In 1983, Goss published a guide entitled Practical guidelines for nursery hygiene with recommendations for garden pest and disease control. It served as part of the basis for a nursery accreditation system in Western Australia.

== Awards ==
- 2017 Posthumous Inductee into Western Australia Women's Hall of Fame
- 1978 Australian Nurseryman of the Year – the first woman awarded the honour

== Personal life ==
Goss would have been forced to resign from the Department of Agriculture if she had married, so she remained unwed and childless though she was in a long-term relationship.

She suffered from chronic pain and asthma.

Goss is remembered by colleagues as a selfless, caring, mentor with extensive scientific expertise.
