= De Geus =

De Geus is a Dutch surname. In the Middle Ages, "geus," (derived from French "gueux"), meant "beggar" or "rogue." However, it is likely that the surname originally reflected an association with the geuzen, a group that opposed Spanish rule in the Netherland from 1566s. In contrast, the surname Geus has a patronymic origin, with Geus as it is a shortened form of the given name Goswin. People with the surname "de Geus" include:

- Aart de Geus (born 1954), Dutch businessman
- Aart Jan de Geus (born 1955), Dutch politician
- Arie de Geus (1930–2019), Dutch businessman
- Brett de Geus (born 1997), American baseball player for the Texas Rangers
- Jonas de Geus, Dutch field hockey player
- Lilian de Geus (born 1991), Dutch competitive sailor
- Pieter de Geus (1929–2004), Dutch politician

== See also ==
- Gilles de Geus, Dutch comics
- De Geus, publishing house affiliated with Singel Uitgeverijen
