= Armorial ware =

Ceramic dishes with coat of arms

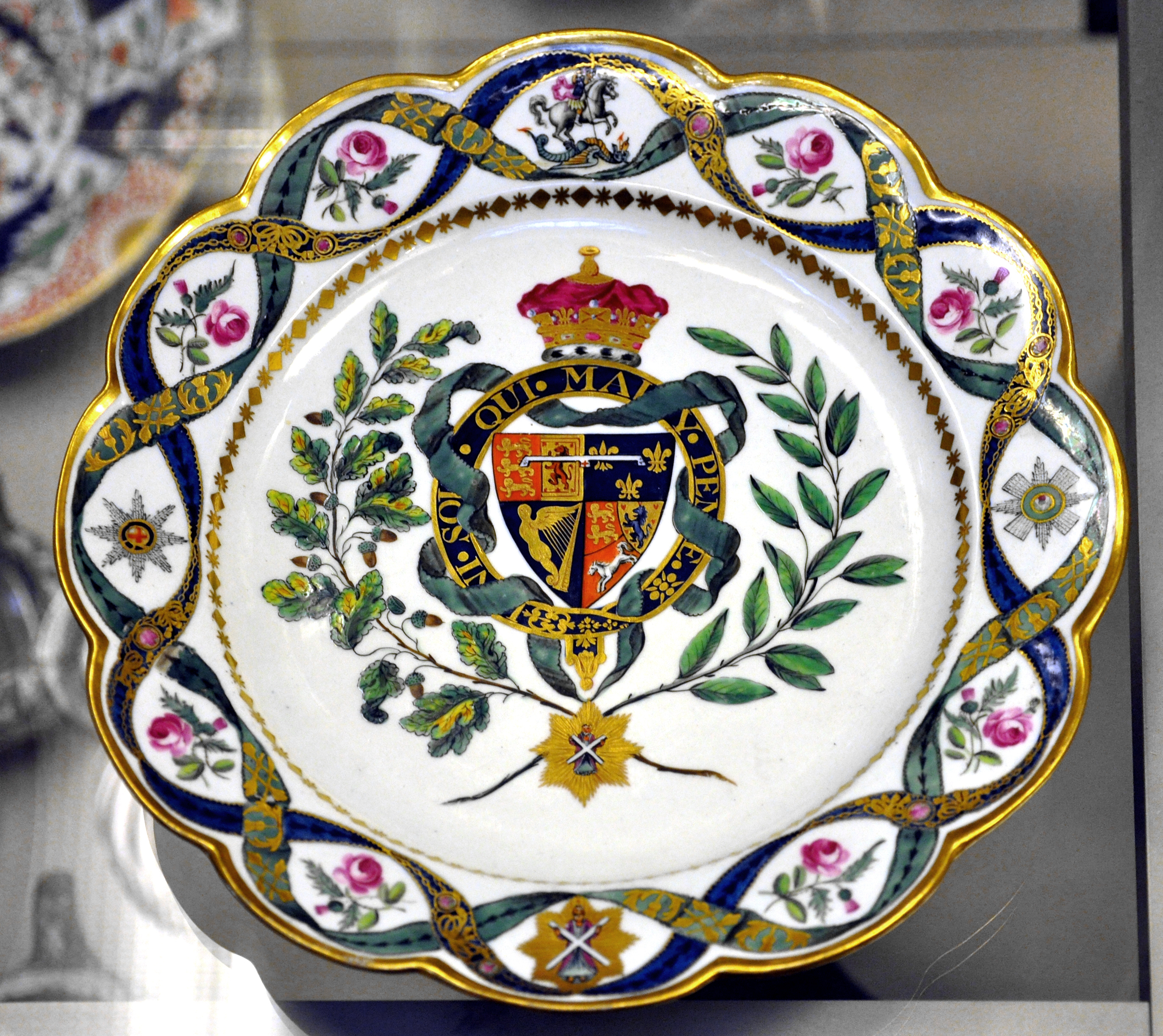
Soft-paste porcelain plate with the coat of arms of the Duke of Clarence, future William IV, 1789, Worcester porcelain, Flight factory, Diameter: 9.7 inches

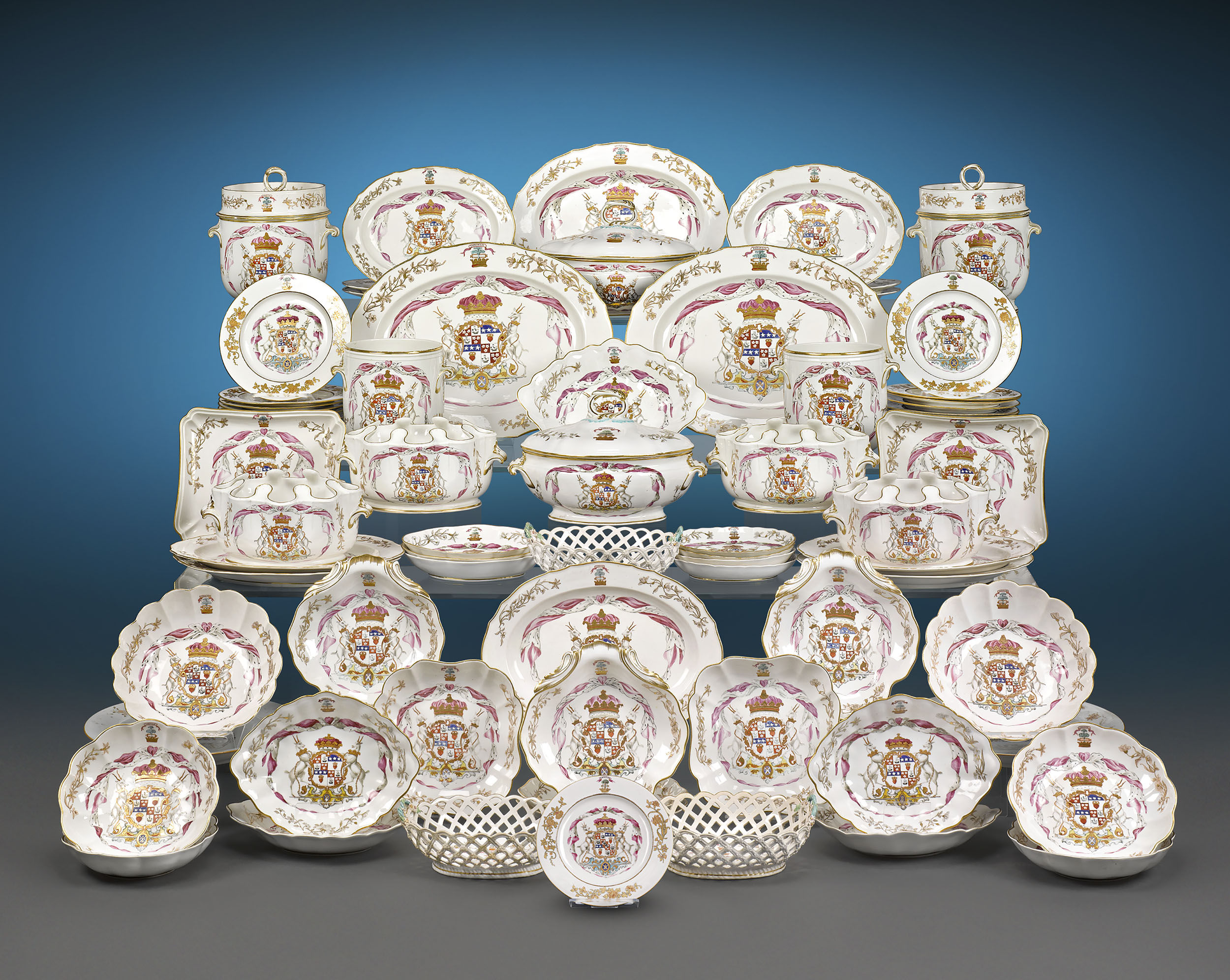
85-piece Derby porcelain dinner service for the 8th Duke of Hamilton, circa 1780–1790

Armorial ware or heraldic china (and a variety of other terms) are ceramics decorated with a coat of arms, either that of a family, or an institution or place. Armorials have been popular on European pottery from the Middle Ages with examples seen on Spanish Hispano-Moresque ware, Italian maiolica, slipware, English and Dutch Delft, and on porcelain from the 18th century. Earlier examples were mostly large pieces such as jugs or basins and ewers, but later whole table services, all painted with the arms, were produced.

Silver tableware also often had coats of arms engraved on it, but as porcelain replaced metal as the favoured material for elite tableware in the 18th century, armorial porcelain became very popular. When overglaze decoration was used, the pottery could produce the glazed ware without the arms, which were then added when a commission was received.

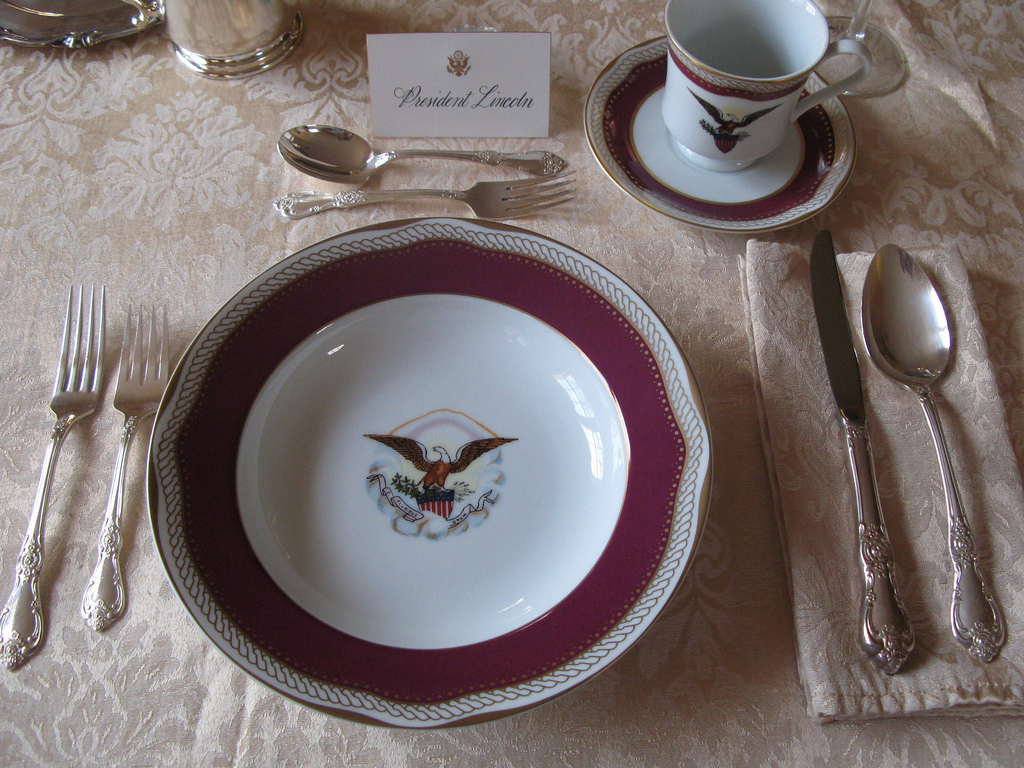
Replica White House china with the arms of the United States

The term is most often associated with Chinese export porcelain, often decorated with the arms and crests of European and American families from the late 17th century through the 19th century. A painting of the arms was sent out to China, and after a considerable period the painted service arrived. British clients imported about 4000 services from 1695 until 1820, when a new prohibitive tax stopped the trade, as the British government sought to protect the domestic potteries.

They were, and even more are, often used at table only on special occasions. They are popular with collectors. Seventeenth-century Dutch armorial plates are called wapenborden and were commonly sold with recurring emblems that cannot be traced to any specific family.

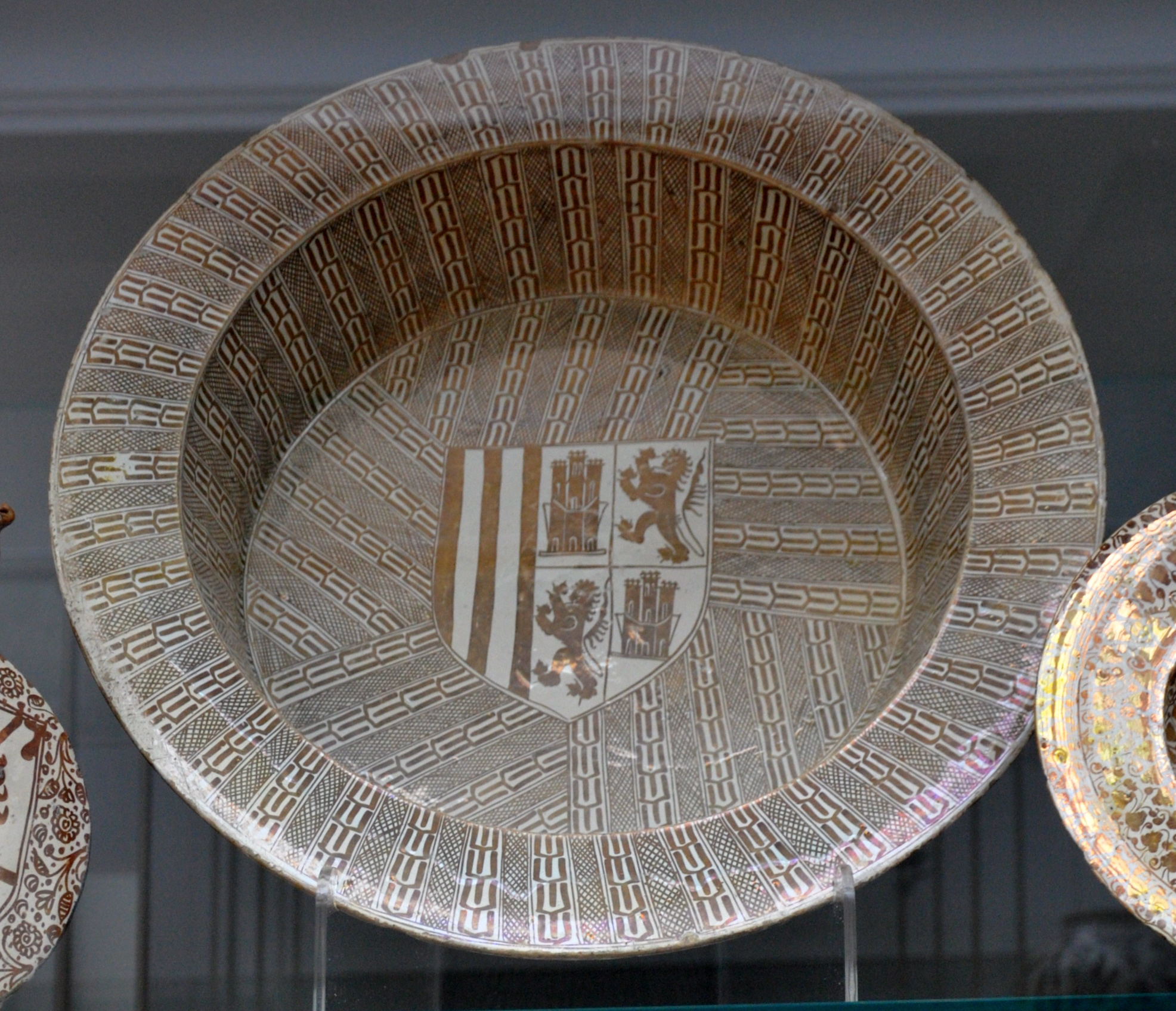
Hispano-Moresque ware, Manises, basin with arms of Maria of Castile, before 1458

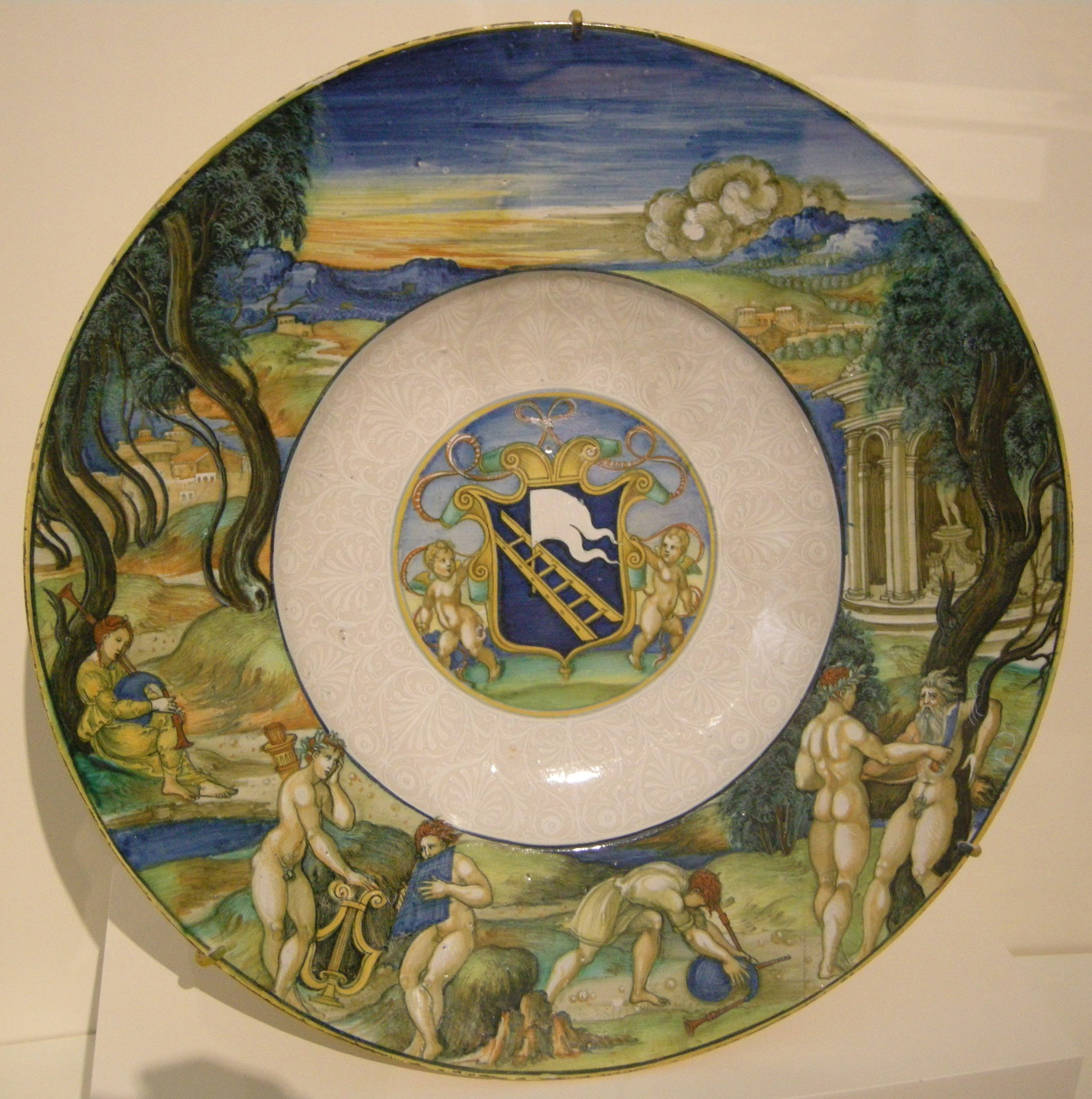
Italian maiolica dish by Nicola da Urbino, c. 1525, with story of Marsyas

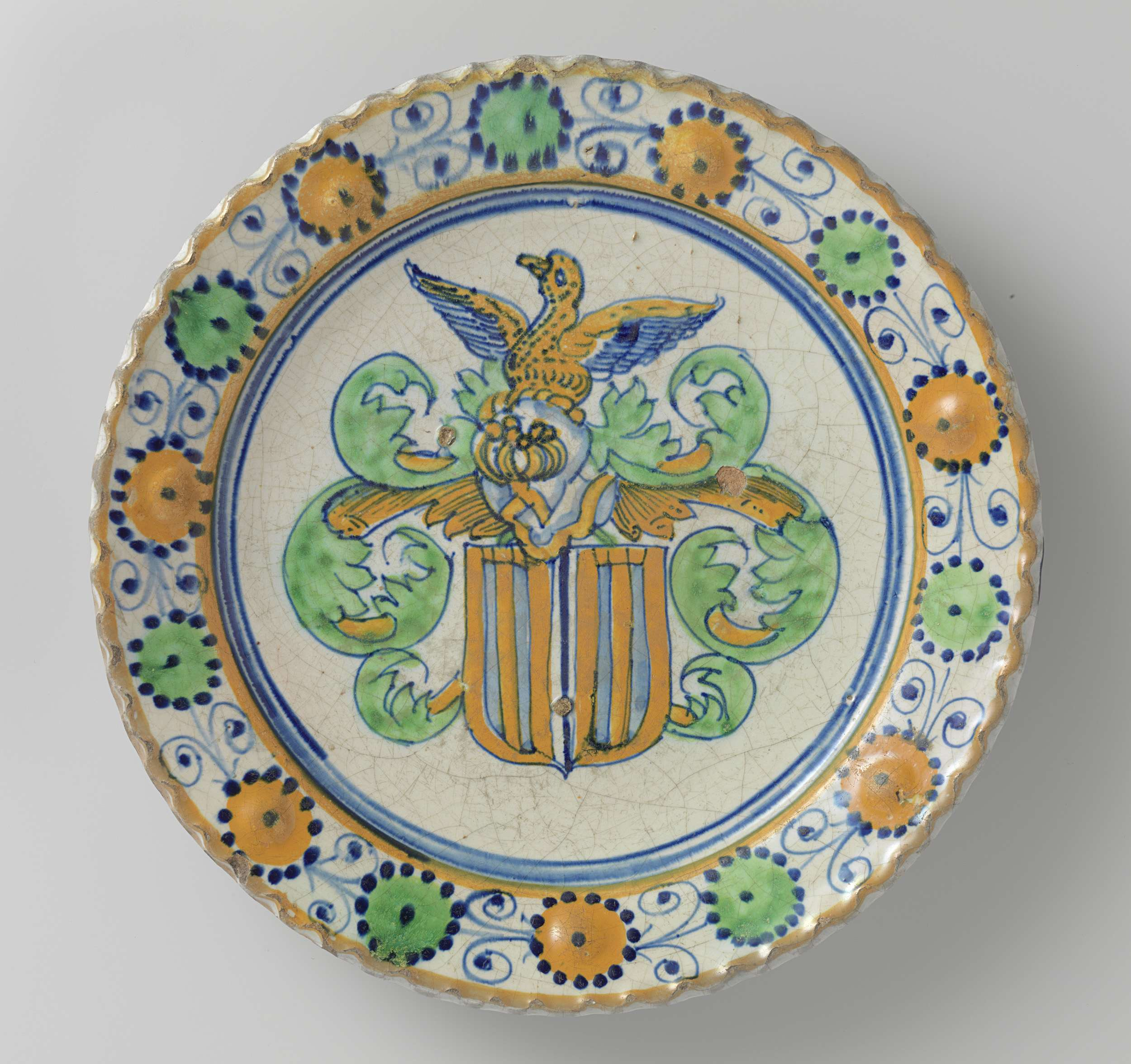
1620 – c. 1640 Dutch armorial plate, Rijksmuseum

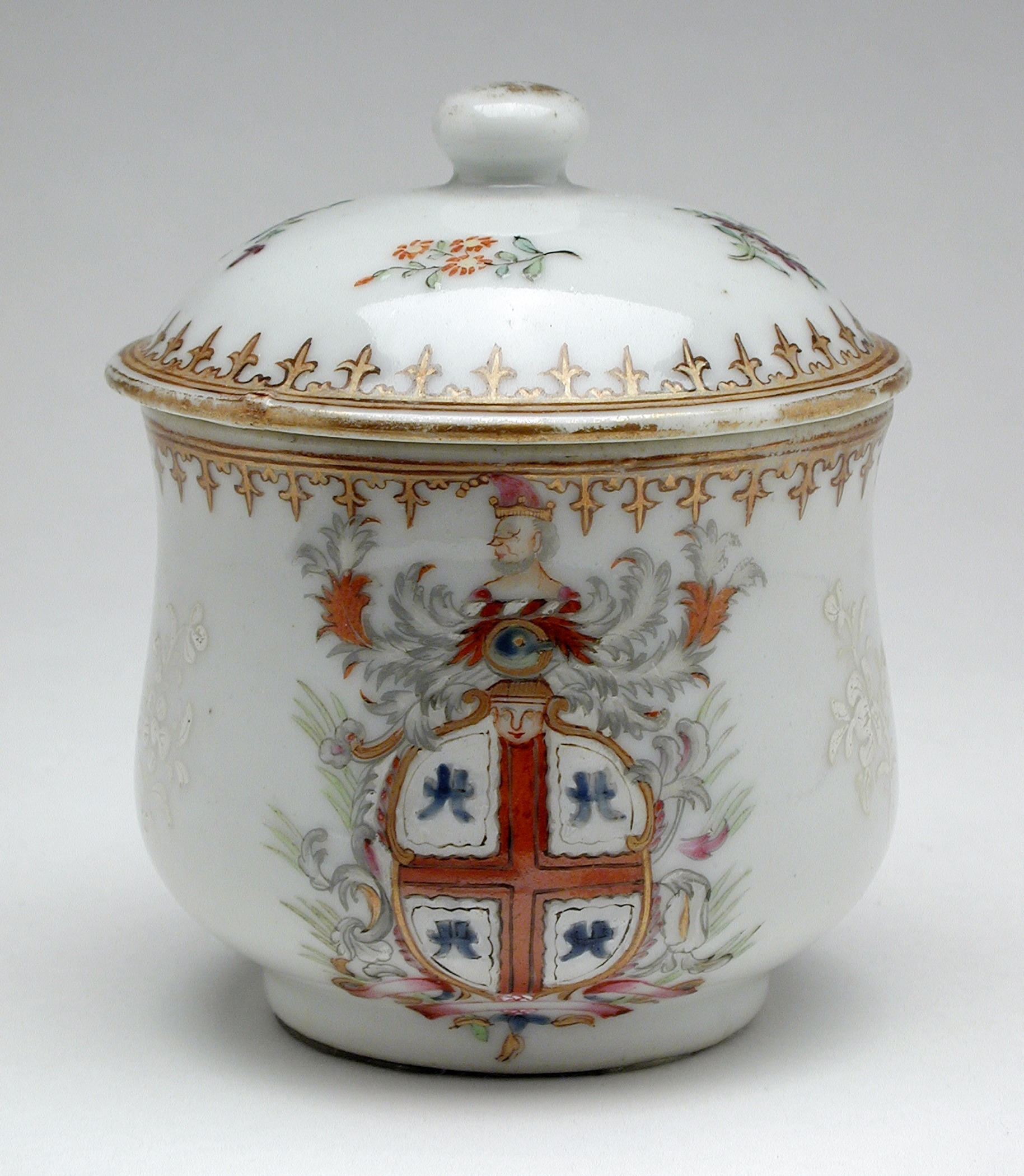
Chinese "custard cup", c. 1750

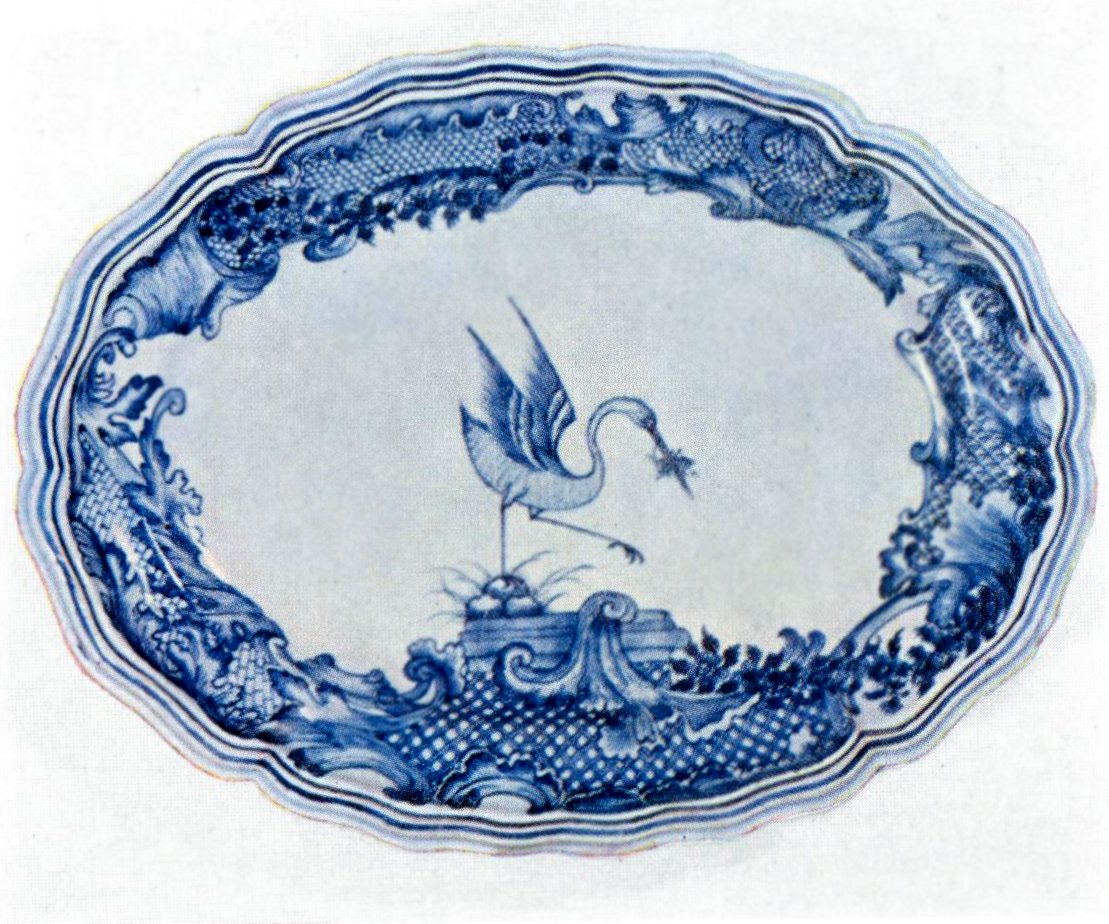
Plate for the Swedish Grill family, China, 18th century

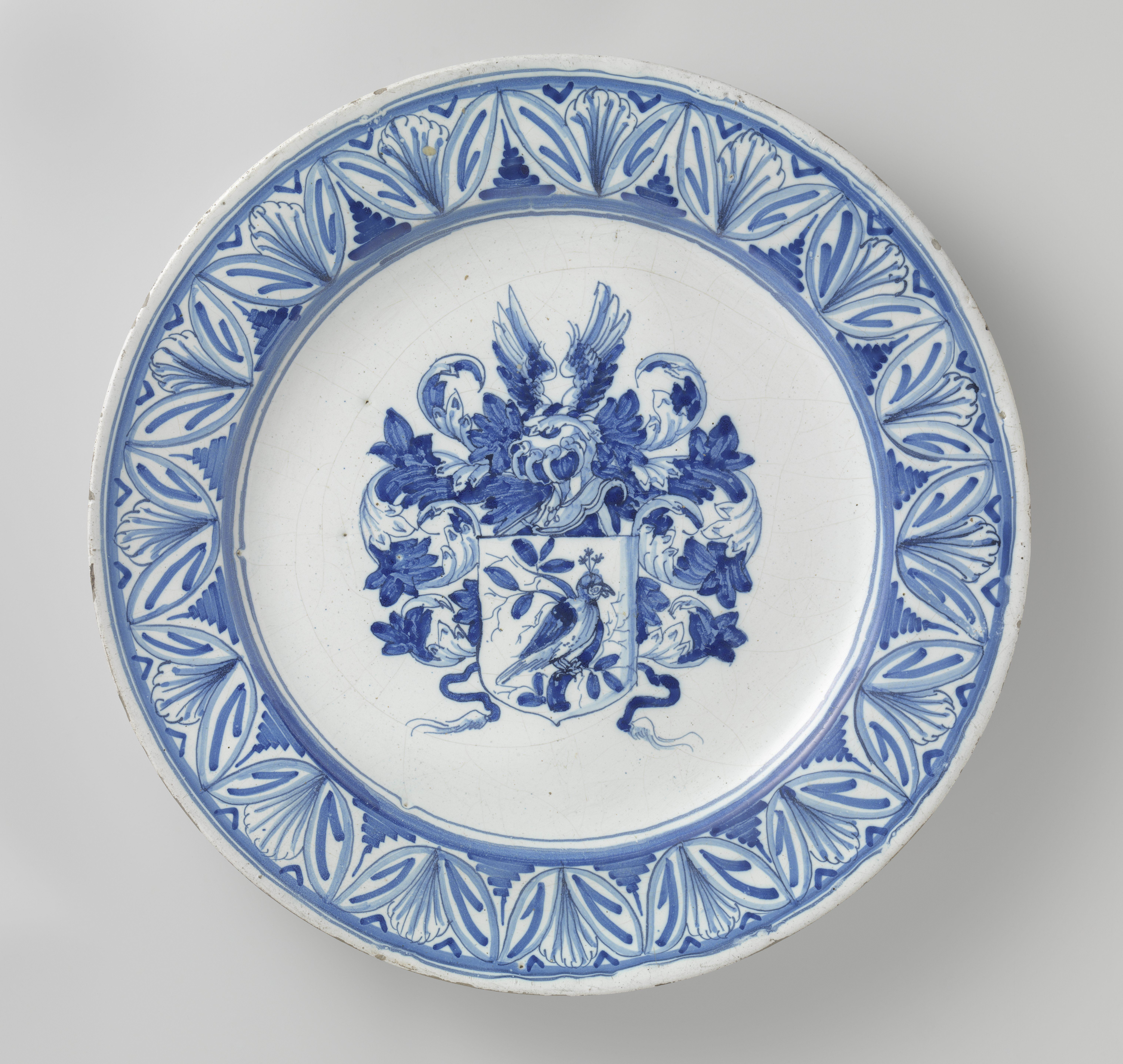
1645–1655 Haarlem armorial plate, Rijksmuseum

== See also ==
- Goss crested china
