= Milton N. Hopkins =

Milton Newton Hopkins Jr (1926 – 5 March 2007) was a farmer in southern Georgia, in the south-eastern United States, as well as a conservationist, naturalist, and author, who had a long association with the Georgia Ornithological Society (GOS).

Hopkins grew up in Fitzgerald, Georgia. He developed an interest in birds from about eight years of age and spent much time exploring the countryside around his home town. He became a member of GOS in 1939, when he was 15, and contributed his first field note to its journal The Oriole in 1942.

Hopkins served in the Navy in World War II, in the Pacific theatre. He was on a destroyer in Tokyo Bay when Japan surrendered. After the war he made use of the G.I. Bill to study zoology at the University of Georgia, eventually achieving a master's degree in 1951.

Hopkins was known primarily as an ornithologist, and was editor of The Oriole 1960–1965, and received the Society's Earl R. Greene Award for outstanding contributions to Georgia ornithology. He published numerous observations of birdlife in South Georgia over the years, and was good friends with many preeminent southern naturalists, notably Herbert L. Stoddard, author of The Bobwhite Quail: Its Habits, Preservation and Increase, the standard reference on bobwhite quail. In 1975 GOS published Hopkins' book, The Birdlife of Ben Hill County, Georgia and Adjacent Areas.

Hopkins traveled widely, but was firmly rooted in his native southern Georgia. The bulk of his adult life was spent at Osierfield, in Irwin County, where he and his family lived in a restored train depot. An ardent conservationist who balanced agribusiness with a concern for the environment, Hopkins was named national Outstanding Tree Farmer of the Year in 1981 by the American Tree Farm System.

In his later years, Hopkins remained very active and befriended Janisse Ray, author of the modern classic Ecology of a Cracker Childhood. Ray was instrumental in encouraging him to publish a collection of his stories of farm life in South Georgia, and in 2001 his book In One Place: The Natural History of a Georgia Farmer was issued to great reviews. In 2001 he also published Around Fitzgerald, Georgia, In Vintage Picture Postcards, part of Arcadia's Postcard History Series. A lifelong student of local history and collector of related ephemera, most of the items highlighted were from his vast personal collection.

Hopkins died at the age of 80 after suffering an aneurysm.
