= Goswin =

Male given name

Goswin is a Germanic male given name originally meaning "friend (win) of the Goths (gos)" As Gosewijn, Goswijn or Gozewijn (with short forms Goos, Goes, Gosse and Geus) it was quite common in the Middle Ages in the Low Countries. Latinized versions include Gos(s)uinus, Gosvinus, and Goswinus, while in French the name has been rendered Gosvin and Gossuin (e.g. Gossuin d'Anchin).

People with this name include:

- Goswin (bishop of Osnabrück) (r. 829–845)
- Gosse Ludigman (died 1000), possibly fictitious governor of Western Frisia
- Goswin I of Heinsberg (ca. 1060–1128), Limburg count, lord of Valkenburg
- Goswin of Anchin (c. 1085–1165), Flemish Benedictine abbot and saint
- Goswin (bishop of Poznań), 12th-century Polish Bishop
- Goswin of Bossut (fl. 1230s), Cistercian writer
- Gozewijn van Randerath (fl. 1250), Bishop of Utrecht
- Goswin von Herike (died 1359), ruler of Livonia
- Goswin Haex van Loenhout (died 1475), Auxiliary Bishop of Utrecht
- Goswin van der Weyden (1455–1543), Flemish painter
- Goswin Nickel (1582–1664), German Jesuit priest
- Goswin de Fierlant (ca. 1735—1804), Flemish councillor
- Goswin de Stassart (1780–1854), Dutch-Belgian politician
- Gozewijn Jan Loncq (1810–1887), Dutch physician and University Dean
- Goswin Karl Uphues(1841–1916), German philosopher
- Goswin von der Ropp (1850–1919), German historian

== See also ==
- Goos (name)
- Goosen, Goossen and Goossens
- Gosse (disambiguation)
- De Geus
