= Goosen =

Goosen is a common Afrikaans surname, meaning "son of Goos" ("Goswin"). Notable people with the surname include:

- Anton Goosen (born 1946), South African musician and songwriter
- Frank Goosen (born 1966), German cabaret artist and author
- Glenn Goosen (born 1962), South African lawyer and judge
- Glenn Goosen (born 1982), Zimbabwean cricketer
- Guy Goosen (born 1959), Zimbabwean swimmer
- Hendrik Goosen (1904–1990), South African fishing captain, discoverer of the coelacanth
- Jeanne Goosen (1938–2020), South African journalist
- Johan Goosen (born 1993), South African rugby player
- Mathys Goosen (born 1996), Dutch swimmer
- Retief Goosen (born 1969), South African golfer
- Quintin Goosen (1946–2014), Zimbabwean cricketer and umpire
- Sammy Goosen (1892–?), South African cyclist
- Wes Goosen (born 1995), South African-born, New Zealand rugby player

== Republiek Goosen ==
Goosen was also the Dutch/Afrikaans name of the State of Goshen (1882–83) in South Africa.

== See also ==
- Goos (name)
- Goossen, Dutch surname
- Goossens, Dutch surname common in Belgium
