= Ben Goossens =

Belgian artist

Ben Goossens is a Belgian artist. He worked for 35 years in his native Belgium as an ad agency art director. After retiring, he has turned to creating photo montages with a distinctive surrealist style reminiscent of his fellow countryman, René Magritte.

Goossens' images have received awards in a number of prestigious international photography competitions, including gold and silver medals at the Trierenberg Super Circuit, the world's largest annual photography salon. Goossens has also seen his work widely published, including an in-depth 10 page exposition in the March 2007 edition of Photo Art International. His composite photos are remarkable for their seamless yet painterly renderings of surrealist dreamscapes.
