= Ellen Goossens =

Belgian biomedical scientist

- Education: Vrije Universiteit Brussel
- Scientific career
- Workplaces: Vrije Universiteit Brussel

Ellen Goossens is a Belgian biomedical scientist who is a professor at the Vrije Universiteit Brussel specialising in male fertility preservation. Her work focuses on cryopreservation, transplantation, and in vitro differentiation of spermatogonial stem cells. She was awarded the 2011 Prize of the Royal Belgian Academy for Medicine and the 2026 Liebaers–Van Steirteghem Prize.

== Early life and education ==
Goossens graduated in biomedical sciences from the Vrije Universiteit Brussels in 2000. She trained in male fertility preservation under the supervision of Herman Tournaye, and obtained her doctoral degree in 2006. Tournaye encouraged her to pursue research ideas with clinical applications. Goossens continued her postdoctoral training at the same laboratory and was appointed lab coordinator in 2012.

== Career and research ==
Gossens became chair of the VUB research group Biology of the Testis. Goossens is affiliated with the Faculty of Medicine and Pharmacy at the Vrije Universiteit Brussel. She was appointed assistant professor in 2011 and promoted to full professor in 2016.

Goossens' research focuses on male reproductive biology, with particular emphasis on the formation of sperm cells and the preservation and restoration of fertility in boys and men at risk of infertility due to disease or medical treatment. Goossens work has targeted patient groups with limited reproductive options. She has developed techniques for the cryopreservation and transplantation of testicular tissue, as well as approaches involving spermatogonial stem cells.

Since 2002, testicular tissue from prepubertal boys at risk of infertility has been cryopreserved at for potential future use. Following preclinical studies, ethical approval was granted for clinical investigations into the autologous transplantation of previously cryopreserved testicular tissue. In 2023, an adult patient underwent transplantation of autologous testicular tissue. In 2026, a patient underwent autologous transplantation of previously cryopreserved testicular tissue that had been collected during childhood prior to chemotherapy. The patient, who had undergone chemotherapy for sickle cell disease during childhood, had experienced treatment-related impairment of spermatogenesis. Following transplantation, the patient produced sperm cells.

== Awards and honours ==
- 2011 Prize of the Royal Belgian Academy for Medicine
- 2026 Liebaers–Van Steirteghem Prize

== Selected publications ==
- Helen M Picton; Christine Wyns; Richard A Anderson; et al. (2015). "A European perspective on testicular tissue cryopreservation for fertility preservation in prepubertal and adolescent boys". Human Reproduction. 30 (11): 2463–2475. doi:10.1093/humrep/dev190. PMID 26358785. Wikidata Q38584517.
- J Onofre; Y Baert; K Faes; Goossens, Ellen (2016). "Cryopreservation of testicular tissue or testicular cell suspensions: a pivotal step in fertility preservation". Human Reproduction Update. 22 (6): 744–761. doi:10.1093/humupd/dmw029. PMC 5099994. PMID 27566839. Wikidata Q26738594.
- Yoni Baert; Joery De Kock; João P Alves-Lopes; Olle Söder; Jan-Bernd Stukenborg; Goossens, Ellen (2016). "Primary Human Testicular Cells Self-Organize into Organoids with Testicular Properties". Stem Cell Reports. 8 (1): 30–38. doi:10.1016/j.stemcr.2016.11.012. PMC 5233407. PMID 28017656. Wikidata Q37583606.
