= Geographical Operations System =

In the telecommunications industry, a Geographical Operations System (GOS) is an integrated process that combines data integration with geographic mapping capabilities within telecommunications companies. This system encompasses the integration of Geographic Information Systems (GIS) and Operational Support Systems (OSS) to facilitate the seamless exchange of information among employees.

== GOS Software ==
GOS software relies on a central repository for critical data to foster better communication between the various branches of a telecom. GOS software may offer companies a means to achieve technological convergence in their marketed products. Open Database Connectivity (ODBC) is utilized to create a discernible pathway for retrieving information from GOS software for a range of employees that may not be familiar with database protocols. The software creates a channel within a company for experts to share information on the various aspects of the telecommunications company, thus opening the spread of information and increasing efficiency for employees.

== Uniqueness ==
The increasing pressures of competition and expansion in the telecommunications market have driven many vendors in the field to reassess the internal organization and cooperation. Technological innovation has introduced greater capacity and capabilities in the telecommunications market, but also added complexity for many companies, as they attempt to develop commercial offerings with an ever-growing list of products and services. A Geographical Operations Systems meshes the importance of Geographical Information Systems – which provides the ability to store data in a geographically-correct map – with the reliance of telecommunications companies on Operational Support Systems as a way to categorize and maintain customer and equipment records.

The Geographical Operations System simplifies interoperability in a telecommunications company by converging resources that may be stored in different programming languages from across the company into a single software program to be utilized by customer satisfaction representatives, equipment technicians, telecommunications engineers, and the accounting department, among others. Information is made general and uniform throughout a company to allow independent employees to carry out tasks without seeking out the expertise and time of coworkers. In practice, GIS platforms integrated with OSS have been used as the master source for network inventory and infrastructure data, with automated links between the two systems supporting real-time spatial queries against operational records instead of manual re-entry.
