= Goss, Missouri =

- Village
- Location within Missouri Location within the United States
- Coordinates: 39°30′53″N 91°56′43″W
- Country: United States
- State: Missouri
- County: Monroe
- Incorporated: March 26, 2001

Area
  - Total: 0.058 sq mi (0.15 km^{2})
  - Land: 0.058 sq mi (0.15 km^{2})
  - Water: 0 sq mi (0.00 km^{2})
- Elevation: 751 ft (229 m)

Population (2020)
  - Total: 0
  - Density: 0/sq mi (0/km^{2})
- Time zone: UTC-6 (Central (CST))
  - Summer (DST): UTC-5 (CDT)
- ZIP code: 65275 (Paris)
- Area code: 660
- FIPS code: 29-28000
- GNIS feature ID: 2396966

Goss is a village in Monroe County, Missouri, United States; it was once incorporated as a town, but reclassified as a village in 2010. According to the 2020 census, the village has no permanent residents.

== History ==
A post office called Goss was established in 1885, and remained in operation until 1954. The community has the name of James Goss, an early settler.

== Geography ==
Goss is in central Monroe County, along U.S. Route 24, which leads southwest 4 miles (6 km) to Paris, the county seat, and northeast 16 miles (26 km) to Monroe City.

According to the U.S. Census Bureau, Goss has an area of 0.06 square miles (0.16 km^{2}), all land. The village lies on a high ground which drains north toward Otter Creek, an east-flowing tributary of the North Fork of the Salt River, and south toward the Middle Fork of the Salt River.

== Demographics ==
Historical population
Census	Pop.	Note	%±
2010	0		—
2020	0		—
U.S. Decennial Census
