= James Goss =

James Goss may refer to:

- James Goss (judge) (born 1953), judge of the High Court of England and Wales
- James Goss (producer) (born 1974), British television producer and writer
- James H. Goss (1820–1886), American politician
