= Georgia Ornithological Society =

U.S. bird conservation organization

- Abbreviation: GOS
- Formation: December 1936; 89 years ago
- Tax ID no.: 23-7044027
- Headquarters: Brookhaven, Georgia
- Executive Committee President: Ed Maioriello
- Website: www.gos.org

The Georgia Ornithological Society is the principal birding and bird conservation organization in the American state of Georgia.

== History ==
The Georgia Ornithological Society (GOS) was founded by a group of 22 people from the Atlanta Birding Club in December 1936. Unlike many ornithological societies, the GOS's main focus is researching birds in a more scientific manner. Over time, however, membership among non-professional scientists has increased. One of the prominent people in attendance of the Atlanta Birding Club's meeting the night before the GOS was established was Roger Tory Peterson, an important 20th century environmentalist.

Herbert Stoddard was chosen as the first president of the Georgia Ornithological Society. Stoddard was an early proponent of the controlled burn, which was a very controversial practice at the time. Stoddard argued that these fires could be used for healthy ecological management. Specifically, these intentional fires acted as disturbances in longleaf-grassland environments in the South. He wrote about these fires in his book The Bobwhite Quail: Its Habits, Preservation, and Increase in 1931. This book is still very influential in the field of wildlife management.

== Mission ==
The mission of the Georgia Ornithological Society is to encourage the scientific study of birds by gathering and disseminating information on Georgia birdlife. It actively promotes bird conservation by encouraging the preservation of habitats vital to the survival of resident and migratory birds. It also awards scholarships, produces scientific publications, and provides fellowship among people interested in nature.

== Activities ==
The Georgia Ornithological Society is involved with the promotion of birding and bird conservation in Georgia. This involves publishing guides on Georgia birds, providing grants and scholarships to bird enthusiasts, and creating community for birders across the state. According to the society's website, meetings are held "two or three times per year in the spring, winter and fall". These meetings last from Friday evening for two or three days, until Sunday or Monday. Meeting activities include presentations by local birders and field trips.

=== The Earle R. Greene Memorial Award ===
The Earle R. Greene Memorial Award is given out yearly to an individual for contributions in ornithology, promoting birding, and service to the Georgia Ornithological Society. Every year, a pool of people are nominated for this honor. This award is named after Earle R. Greene, the second GOS president and founder of the Louisiana Ornithological Society. He assisted in the creation of the first printed checklist by the organization in the state. The inaugural recipient of the Earle R. Greene Award was Harriett DiGiola, awarded in 1975.

=== Publications and periodicals ===
The Georgia Ornithological Society publishes guides to birds in various areas in Georgia, an annotated checklist of Georgia birds, and an index to Georgia bird records.

The more regular publications by the society are The Oriole, a biannual Georgia ornithological journal, and GOShawk, a newsletter with updated information about the society and its activities. Both periodicals are available to members in good standing.

== Leadership ==
The Georgia Ornithological Society is presided over by an executive committee of 18 members under President Larry Carlile. There is also a larger group of general committee members.
