= Goos (name) =

Goos is a Dutch and Low German masculine given name, a short form of Goswin, as well as a patronymic surname ("son of Goos").

Surname

- Abraham Goos (c.1590–1643), Dutch cartographer and publisher, father of Pieter Goos
- August Hermann Ferdinand Carl Goos (1835–1917), Danish lawyer, professor and Minister of Iceland
- Carl Andreas August Goos (1797–1855), German-Danish painter
- Chris Goos (born 1981), American soccer player
- Elies Goos (born 1989), Belgian volleyball player
- Fritz Goos (1883–1968), German physicist and astronomer a.o. known for the Goos–Hänchen effect
- Marc Goos (born 1990), Dutch racing cyclist
- Maria Goos (born 1956), Dutch playwright and screenwriter
- Merrilyn Goos, Australian mathematician
- Michelle Goos (born 1989), Dutch handball player
- Pieter Goos (1616–1675), Dutch cartographer, copperplate engraver, publisher and bookseller
- Sofie Goos (born 1980), Belgian triathlete

Given name

- Goos Meeuwsen (born 1982), Dutch circus performer

== See also ==
- Goos (disambiguation)
