= Goss crested china =

English ceramics manufacturer

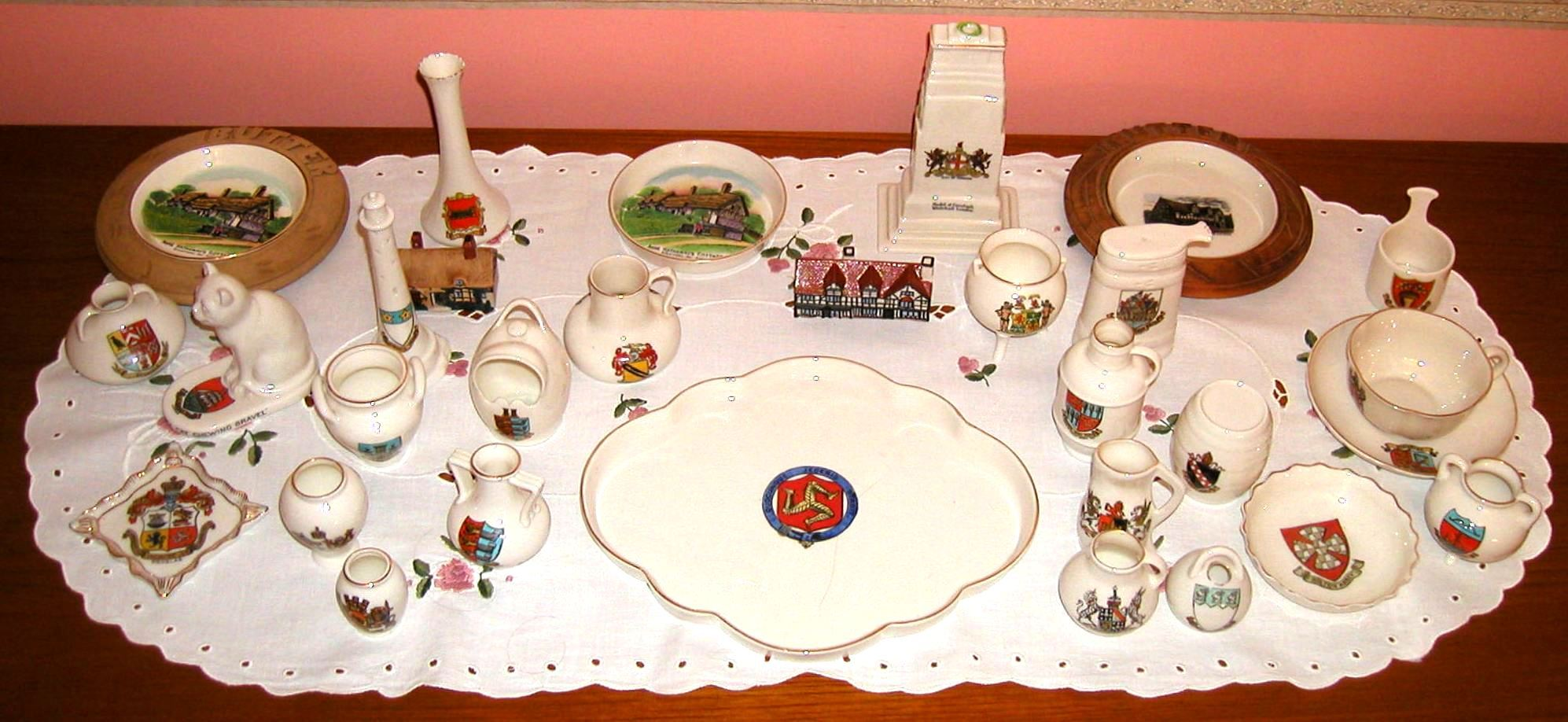
Typical Goss collection

Goss, England mark

Goss crested china is typically in the form of small white glazed porcelain models, made from 1858 to 1939, carrying the coat of arms of the place where they were sold as a souvenir, thus being a form of model heraldic china.

Other factories, including Carlton, Shelley and Arcadian, also made souvenir ware but Goss is still the most collectable.

== Historical ==
The Industrial Revolution and the coming of railways opened up travel to working people rather than just the wealthy and, in particular, it led to the growth of English seaside resorts like Blackpool and Southend-on-Sea.

William Henry Goss (1833–1906), owner of the Falcon pottery in Stoke-on-Trent, and his sons, Adolphus and Victor, are often credited with the idea of making souvenir ware bearing crests and names of seaside resorts in the late 19th century. In fact, Lowestoft porcelain in particular, but also other factories, had been producing such pieces for a century of so, but not as their main type of product. Now, many British people are familiar with the white glazed porcelain souvenirs, typically in classical shapes of Roman and Greek antiquities. They also made tiny replicas of visitor attractions like a statue of Captain Cook with the name and crest of the Captain's home town of Whitby. Small busts of famous people like Queen Victoria or George V, were also made together with of ships and cars. Goss cottages are amongst the most collectible.

By the end of the 19th century and the beginning of the 20th century, Goss china was immensely popular and, it is said, at least 90% of homes had at least one piece of Goss crested China. The First World War caused a decline and in 1929 the Goss family sold their factory which continued to produce souvenir ware until the end of the 1930s. After the Second World War interest in Goss revived and has continued.

== Pieces ==
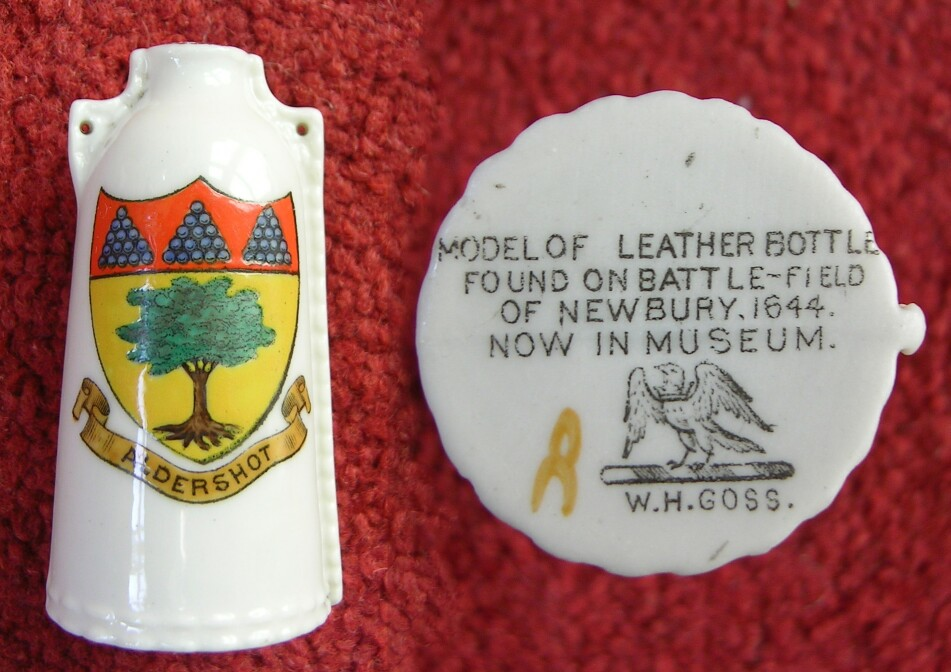

Genuine Goss usually has an inscription on the base describing the item and also a goshawk crest with the name W.H.Goss below it. The impressed Serif mark 'W.H.Goss' shows manufacture 1858–1887 while the Sans-serif mark indicates 1887–1916. Some examples carry Registration numbers and these were made from 1884–1914. Where the Goss mark is the larger 'rubber stamped' then production from 1925–1930 is indicated. Pieces made from 1930, after the factory was sold, also bear the word 'England'.

In all there are over 2,500 different models ranging from parian figures to tea services to pots and jugs to beautiful coloured figures and cottages and they can be found with over 10,000 different decorations. The most valuable pieces have a crest of the place where the antiquity was found or of the location of the landmark—so called 'matching crests'.

== Falcon Pottery building ==
Although the production of Goss China has long finished, the remaining Falcon Pottery building is a grade two listed building part of the London Road site owned by an unrelated company, Portmeirion.
