= Tom Goss =

Tom Goss may refer to:

- Tom Goss (American football) (born c. 1946), American football player, college athletics administrator
- Tom Goss (musician) (born 1981), American musician
- Tom Goss, drummer in New York-based American rock bands St. Johnny and Grand Mal
