= Jan Goossen =

Dutch sculptor

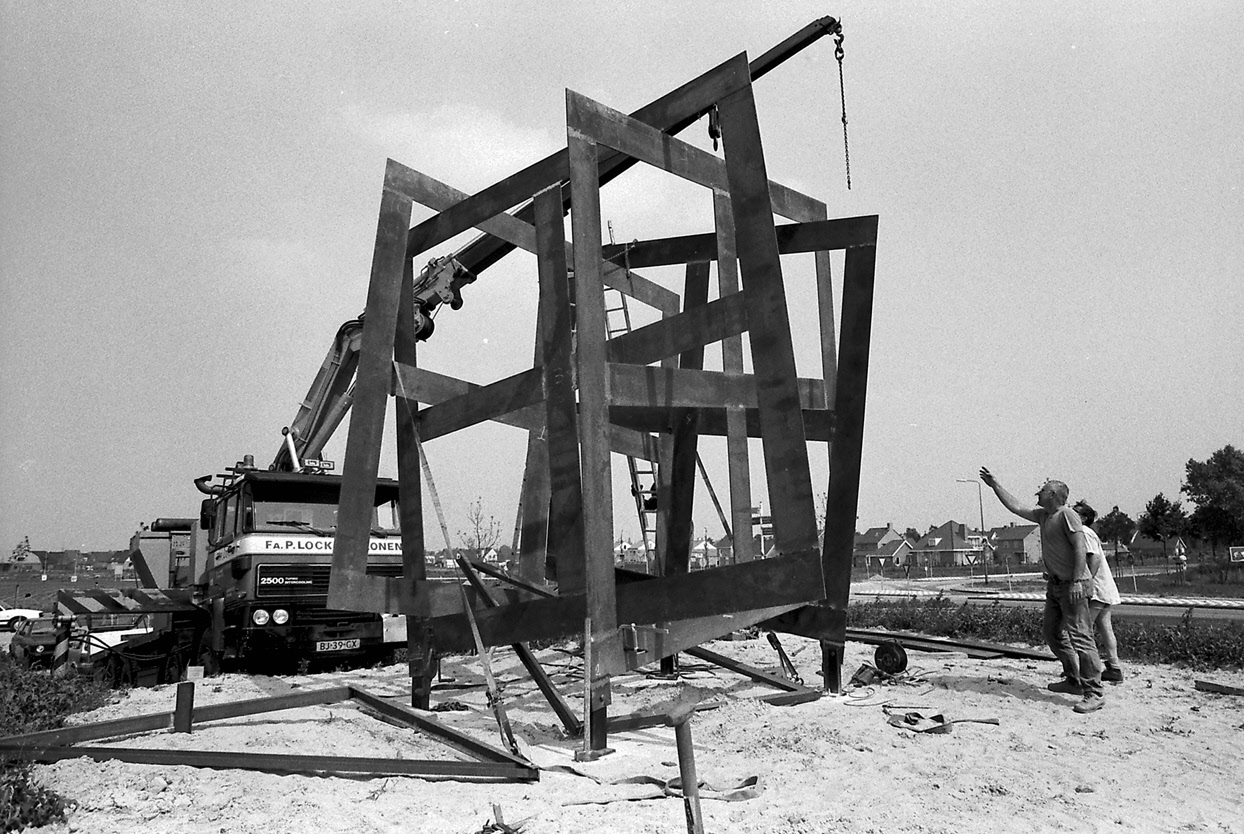
- Installation of artwork "Running Squares" by artist Jan Goossen, 1989
- Born: 9 October 1937; Maracaibo, Venezuela
- Died: 1 January 2005 (aged 67); Goes, Netherlands
- Education: Rietveld Academy; Heald College

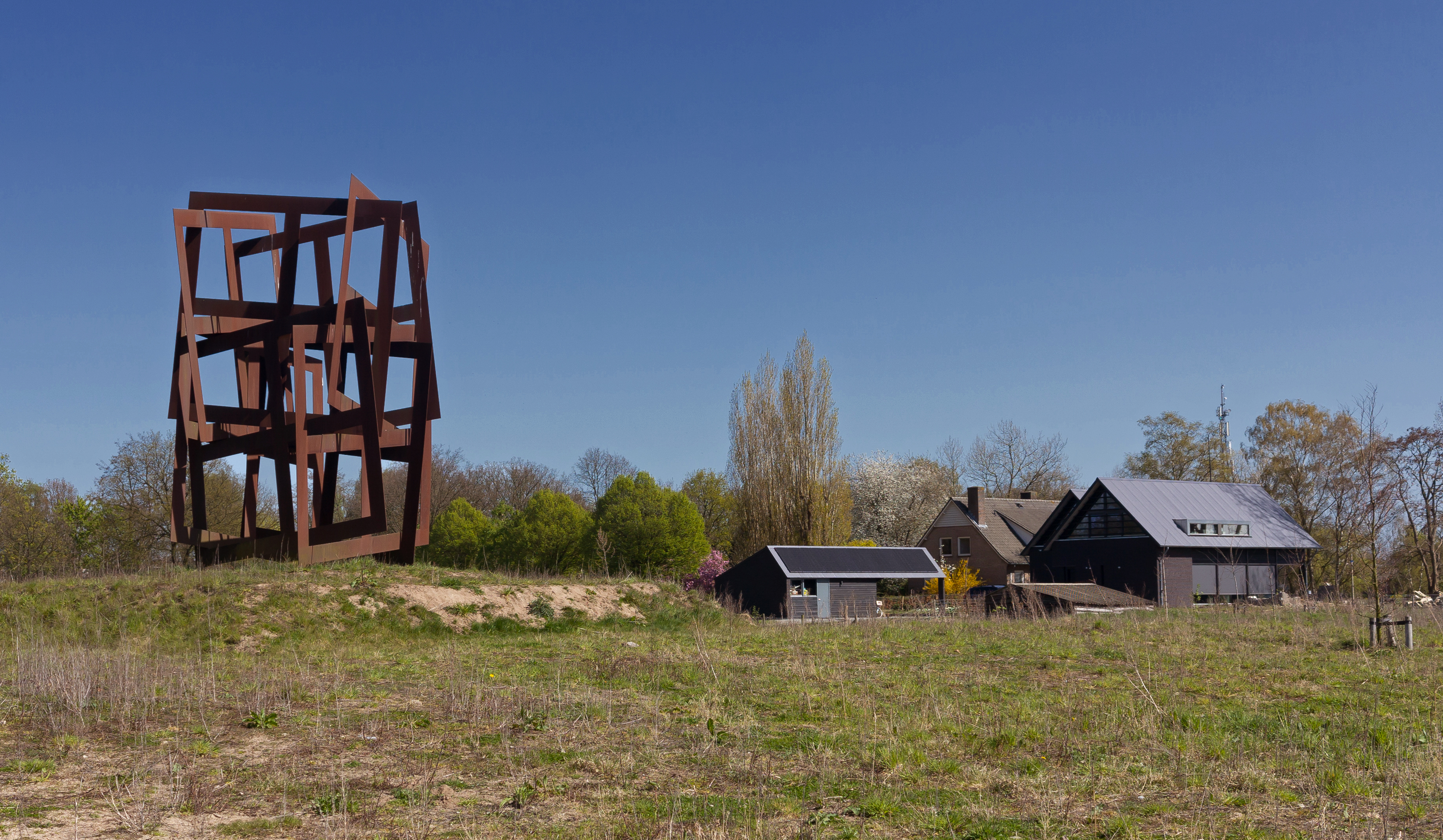
Rosmalen, street art Running Squares

Jan Goossen (9 October 1937 – 1 January 2005) was a Dutch sculptor.

== Life and work ==
Goossen was born in Maracaibo to Dutch parents. He studied at the Rietveld Academy in Amsterdam (1956–1961), and earned a bachelor's degree in architecture at Heald College in San Francisco, USA (1965–1967). He also received several stipends to travel abroad for his craft (i.e, Maison Descartes Paris 1961–1962, finalist Zellerbach competition San Francisco 1965, Stipendium C.R.M. 1973, and a travel grant in 1978). In his training period, he specialized as a sculptor, designer and draftsman.

Goossen's work can be defined as non-figurative, geometric and abstract, with a focus on people and their relationships with the industrial world. His pieces display intricate horizontal and vertical lines which create gaps where the light penetrates. All these angularities emphasized Goossen's use of vibrant colors, like bright red.

Jan Goossen's sculptures can be seen in the Netherlands and in the United States. His first assignment was a relief at the Wells Fargo Bank, San Francisco (1966), followed by a sculptural wall in the Golden Gate Center (1967). Back in the Netherlands, he worked for the Blaricum aged care home and for the Shell-laboratorium of Rijswijk (1969). After finishing a commission for Lisse (1970), he produced one of his most controversial pieces, the sculpture at the Spui 'Piramide' (1976). The pyramidal shape of the piece offered pedestrians a shaded place to sit down and rest, but the aesthetic of the piece led to discontent in the neighborhood. Eventually, it was relocated to Gaasperplaspark on the outskirts of the city (1987). Other works are found in Gemeente, Amsterdam (1972), Royal Building Service, Zuidwolde (1974), 'East Jesus County Revisited' next to the Ir. Otten bad in Eindhoven (1975), 'Septum, in gesprek met de vorigen' Stadswandelpark Eindhoven (1982), 'Running Squares' for Rosmalen (1988). The fountain-like sculpture next to the Maas’ bridge in Heusden 'Maasbeeld' was finished in 1994, 'Tree of Learning'(1998) in front of the Carolus Borromeus College in Helmond and his last piece 'Donjon' (2002) is found in Vlijmen (Heusden) in front of the Rabobank.

Goossen also lectured at the Mollerinstituut in Tilburg, Netherlands (1976–1989), and became a member of the Beroepsvereniging van Beeldende Kunstenaars (Professional Association of Visual Artists) BBK'69 (Amsterdam). He was also a member of the Dutch Circle of Sculptors Amsterdam (1975–1981). He married twice—his second wife known to be the ceramist artist Yvette Lardinois. Jan Goossen died of cancer in the hospital of Goes on 1 January 2005.
