= Francis P. Goss =

American politician

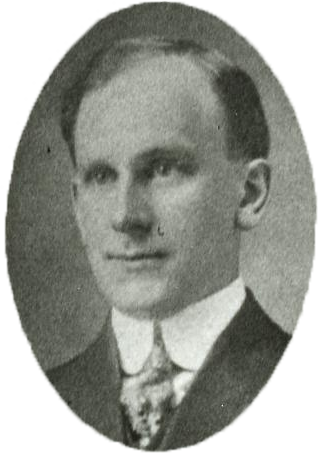
- Goss in 1913

Member of the Washington House of Representatives for the 45th district
- In office 1911–1915

Personal details
- Born: July 21, 1879 Blackrock, Ireland
- Died: October 10, 1973 (aged 94) Los Angeles County, California, United States
- Party: Republican

Francis Patrick Goss (July 21, 1879 – October 10, 1973) was an American politician in the state of Washington. He served in the Washington House of Representatives.
