= William Henry Goss =

English potter (1833-1906)

William Henry Goss (30 July 1833 London - 4 January 1906 Stoke upon Trent) was an English potter notable for having developed the souvenir trade in pottery with his Goss crested china.

== Gossware ==
Born in London to Richard Goss and Sophia Mann, William was a student at the School of Design at Somerset House in London, from where in 1857 he was employed as chief artist of the Stoke upon Trent firm of William Taylor Copeland, who had bought the business interests of his partner Josiah Spode II. Shortly after, in 1858, Goss started his own business in Stoke upon Trent. At first he produced ivory porcelain of such quality as to merit an award at the 1851 International Exhibition. His experiments led to marked improvements in jewelled porcelain and heraldic china. It was not until the 1880s, under the influence of his sons Adolphus, Godfrey, Victor and Huntley, were the famous small white-glazed vases and pots with heraldic arms for presentations being produced. These items made up a large portion of his production. These were soon joined by small items depicting interesting local scenery.

In 1906, a League of Goss Collectors was founded, becoming the International League in 1918

The business was taken over by Cauldon Potteries in 1929, the name Goss still being used. Finally it became a subsidiary of the Royal Doulton group. By 1940, the Goss factory had ceased production.

In the late 1960s, Gossware became very collectable and in 1970 a modern Goss Collectors club was founded. Nearly all pieces of Gossware can be identified by a goshawk crest on the base with W. H. Goss printed underneath. Pieces made after 1931 also have the word England below the mark.

Besides his work in pottery, he wrote a few books, was the biographer of Llewellynn Jewitt, was vice-president of the North Staffordshire Field Club, a fellow of the Royal Geographical Society and the Royal Meteorological Society.

His wife was Georgiana Goldswain whom he married in 1854 and they produced seven children, his son Adolphus later joining the business.

He was buried in Hartshill cemetery.

== Books ==
- William Henry Goss, The Life and Death of Llewellyn Jewitt (London: Henry Gray, 1884)

== See also ==
- Goss crested china
