= Goossee =

Lake in Schleswig-Holstein, Germany

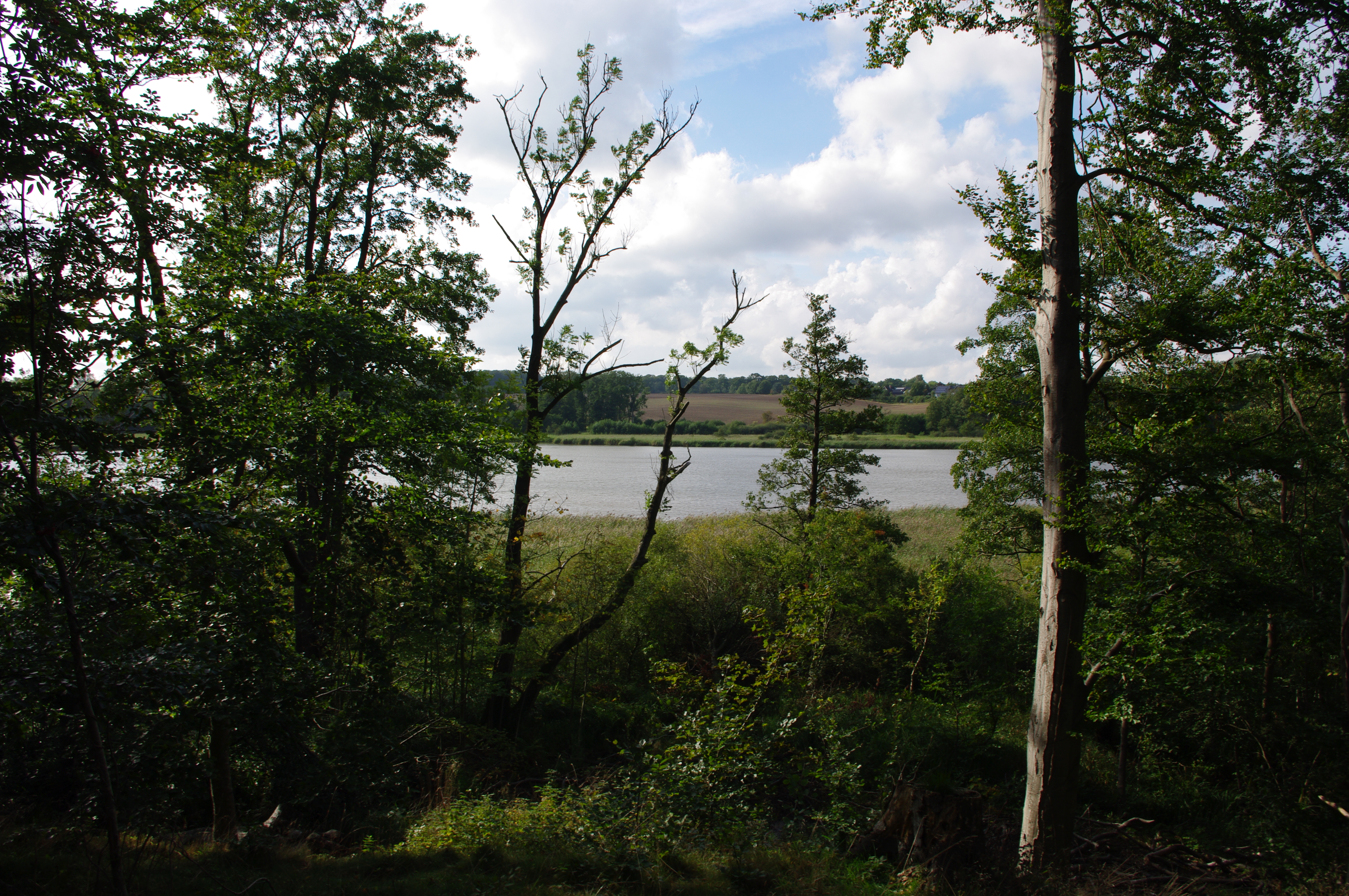
- Protected landscape area "Coastal Landscape Danish Wohld": The Goossee viewed from the east.

- Location within Schleswig-Holstein
- Location: Kreis Rendsburg-Eckernförde, Schleswig-Holstein
- Coordinates: 54°26′29″N 9°51′20″E
- Basin countries: Germany

Goossee (Danish: Goos Sø) is a lake in Kreis Rendsburg-Eckernförde, Schleswig-Holstein, Germany.
