= GEU =

GEU may refer to:

- Geu, a commune in France
- Glendale Municipal Airport, in Arizona, United States, FAA identifier GEU
- Graphic Era University, in Uttarakhand, India
