= Justice Goss =

Justice Goss may refer to:

- Charles A. Goss (1864–1938), associate justice of the Nebraska Supreme Court
- Evan B. Goss (1872–1930), associate justice of the North Dakota Supreme Court
