= Department of Primary Industries and Regional Development (Western Australia) =

Western Australian government department

Department of Primary Industries and Regional Development, Western Australia

Agency overview
- Formed: 1894
- Jurisdiction: Government of Western Australia
- Headquarters: 1 Nash Street, Perth, Western Australia
- Employees: 1,687 (2006), 900 (2016)
- Agency executive: Heather Brayford, Director General
- Website: www.dpird.wa.gov.au

The Department of Primary Industries and Regional Development (DPIRD) is a Western Australian government department responsible for regulating and advancing agricultural and food industries, fisheries and regional development within the state. It was formed by an amalgamation of the Department of Agriculture and Food, Department of Fisheries and Department of Regional Development in 2017.

The Minister for Agriculture and Food, the Minister for Regional Development and the Minister for Fisheries are responsible for the department.

In 2004 the department had operating costs of $215,000,000 approx with $120,000,000 provided directly by the state government. The balance was from federal government grants, public operating activities and user charges and fees.

This department was also responsible for quarantine control on all plants, soil and animal products brought into the state. The Agricultural Protection Board [needs updating] is also part of this and responsible for the eradication of pests in Western Australia; including the rainbow lorikeet (Trichoglossus moluccanus), skeleton weed (Chondrilla juncea), and Portuguese millipede (Ommatoiulus moreletii).

== History ==
In 1894, Premier John Forrest, established the Bureau of Agriculture under the chairmanship of Charles Harper. The members were A. R. Richardson, W. Paterson (the first manager of the Agricultural Bank), J. H. D. Amherst, F. H. Piesse and G. L. Throssell. Initially, the bureau was not placed under the supervision of a minister. This changed in April 1898 when the bureau became the Agricultural Advisory Board and a new Department of Agriculture was gazetted under the control of Throssell as Commissioner for Crown Lands.

Professor William Lowrie was appointed director in 1908. He resigned in 1911. Sir James Mitchell was at this time Minister for Agriculture and he expanded the senior position to three commissioners: George Lowe Sutton, as Commissioner for the Wheat Belt, James M. B. Connor as Commissioner for the South-West; and James P. Moody as Commissioner for the Fruit Industries.

=== Names ===
- Western Australian Bureau of Agriculture 1894–1898
- Department of Agriculture 1898–1996
- Agriculture Western Australia 1996–2006
- Department of Agriculture and Food (Western Australia) 2006–2017
- Department of Primary Industries and Regional Development 2017

== Research stations ==
The department operates the following research stations throughout Western Australia:

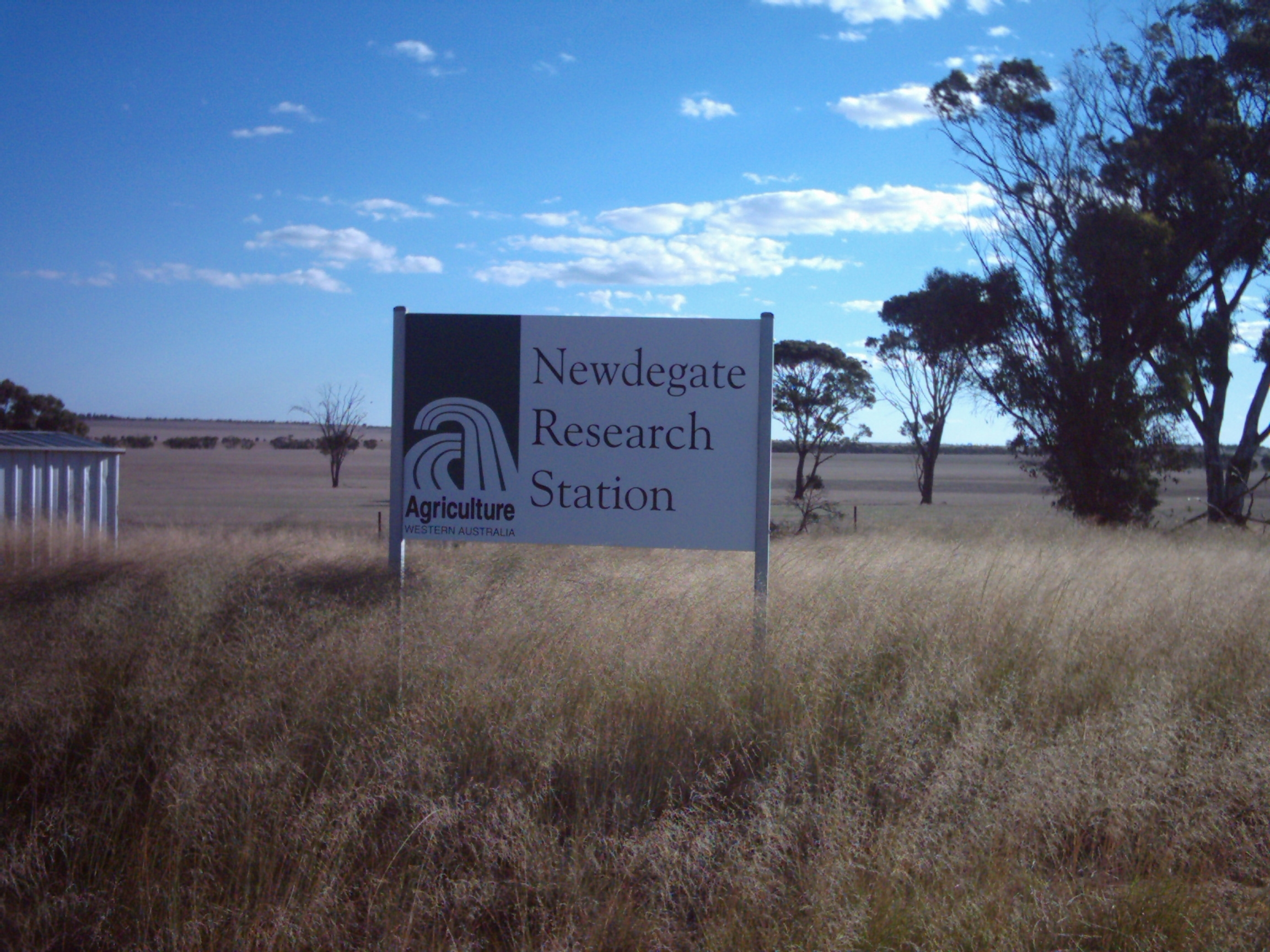
Newdegate Research Station entrance

- Avondale Agricultural Research Station
- Badgingarra Research Station
- Esperance Downs Research Station
- Gascoyne Research Station – Carnarvon
- Katanning Research Station
- Kununurra: Frank Wise Research Institute
- Manjimup Research Station
- Medina Research Station
- Merredin Research Station
- Mount Barker Research Station
- Newdegate Research Station
- Vasse Research Station
- Wongan Hills Research Station

== See also ==
- Buy West, Eat Best
