= Herbert L. Stoddard =

American conservationist

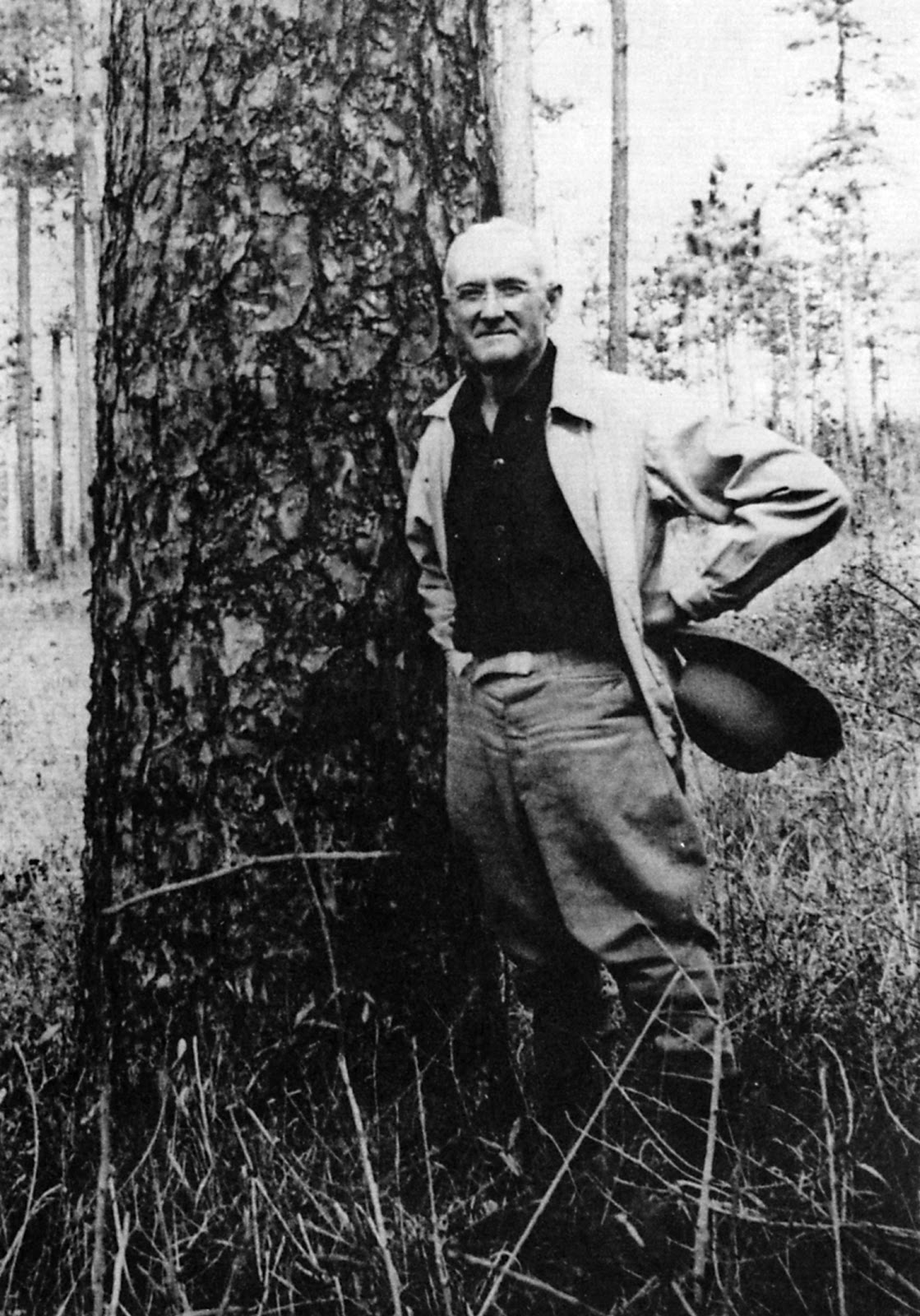
Stoddard stands among a stand of old-growth longleaf pine

Herbert Lee Stoddard (February 24, 1889 – November 15, 1970) was an American naturalist, conservationist, forester, wildlife biologist, ecologist, ornithologist, taxidermist, and author. In the 20th century he earned a reputation for being one of the American Southeast's most prominent conservationists and a pioneering forest ecologist. He is most well known for his seminal book, The Bobwhite Quail: Its habits, preservation, and increase (1931). He is also widely credited with advocating for the practice of prescribed fire as a tool for wildlife management. He was married to Ada Wechselberg, with whom he had one son, Herbert "Sonny" L. Stoddard Jr.

The forest management method he developed with Leon Neel in Georgia's longleaf-wiregrass region is still used today. Stoddard was also a friend and colleague of Aldo Leopold and helped establish wildlife management as a profession while encouraging America to reject industrialized agriculture in favor of ecological preservation. This was codified in his book Memoirs of a Naturalist. The U.S. Bureau of Biological Survey hired Stoddard to study the habitat and life history of Red Hills quail, ensuring its sustainability in the region.

In 1935 he received the William Brewster Memorial Award from the American Ornithological Society. He thereafter received the Silver Star and Letter of Commendation from Admiral Nimitz Herb for his actions during World War II.^{[needs verification]}

In 1958 Stoddard co-founded Tall Timbers Research Station.

== Early life ==
Herbert Lee Stoddard was born on February 24, 1889, in Rockford, Illinois, to Helen Eugenia Wallace and Herbert A. Stoddard. While he never finished high school, he had a keen sense for the natural world. Like many early naturalists, Stoddard gained insight into the world through agricultural and taxidermy. A few years after he was born, his family moved from Chicago to Florida at the age of four where Stoddard spent 7 years in the pinewoods prior to the timber industry arriving. During this time he worked at a very young age with cattlemen and observed them setting fire to the woods. Stoddard remarked years later about his experiences at such a young age, "that no schooling or advantages could have been more valuable to me ... in my later years as ornithologist, ecologist, and wildlife researcher."

Stoddard's family moved back to Rockford, Illinois in 1900 where he pursued his love of nature. With his patience for formal education in short supply, Stoddard dropped out just before high school and moved to Prairie du Sac, Wisconsin to work on the Herman Wagner farm in Sauk County. During that time, he had the fortune to apprentice as a taxidermist under a man named Ed Ochsner. Stoddard paid Ochsner $25 to learn taxidermy under the condition that Stoddard would not compete with Ochsner locally. Stoddard rotated his residence by spending summers working on the farm and winters working with Ochsner, who also happened to be a field contact for the Milwaukee Public Museum. Stoddard received his first professional break when a hippopotamus owned by the Ringling Brothers Circus died in Maraboo, Wisconsin. The Ringlings were friends and hunting partners of Ochsner. Alfred Ringling contacted Ochsner who, in turn, decided that it should be transported to the Milwaukee Public Museum. Being such a large animal, Stoddard stuck around for a week to assist the head taxidermist for the Milwaukee Public Museum, George Shrosbree, with processing the animal for transport. Shrosbree was suitably impressed with Stoddard's enthusiasm and offered Stoddard a job as assistant taxidermist in March 1910.

== Career ==
Stoddard worked as a taxidermist for the Milwaukee Public Museum in Wisconsin (1910-1913) and the Field Museum of Natural History in Chicago, Illinois (1913-1920) as a taxidermist, field collector, and ornithologist. In 1920, Stoddard returned to work at the Milwaukee Public Museum and shortly thereafter became increasingly involved with the ornithological community. Realizing that museum work would likely keep him indoors for more time than he fancied, Stoddard began thinking about a career shift that focused more on being a field naturalist, with an emphasis on birds, rather than taxidermy. He helped found the Inland Bird Banding Association during the 1922 meeting of the American Ornithologist's Union and began bird banding during his travels for the Milwaukee Public Museum. This led to a number of publications in ornithological journals. Stoddard documented several rare bird records for the state of Wisconsin including the first definitive specimen of the European Starling in 1923.

In 1924 Stoddard was recruited by the U.S. Bureau of Biological Survey, a predecessor bureau to the U.S. Fish and Wildlife Service, to study northern bobwhite quail (Colinus virginianus) in northern Florida and southern Georgia. Bobwhite quail populations had recently been in decline and a study was launched to investigate the causes, and what could be done to reverse the trend. This investigation, known as the Cooperative Quail Investigation, was funded by wealthy landowners in the region that began to suspect a downward trend in bobwhite quail numbers. The study culminated in the publication of his most well-known work, The Bobwhite Quail: Its habits, preservation, and increase (1931). After the book was published, Stoddard formed the Cooperative Quail Study Association in order to continue his quail research.

In conjunction with Stoddard's wildlife management work, forestry played a central role in his conservation of some of the most ecologically preserved longleaf pine savannas remaining. Following his bobwhite quail investigation, Stoddard became a forestry consultant. In 1950, Stoddard hired Leon Neel, a graduate of the University of Georgia's forestry school and developed what is currently referred to as the Stoddard-Neel Method of forestry. This practice of managing longleaf pine forests relies on a selective logging approach resulting in a diverse forest structure of uneven-aged trees. Management of the understory is principally controlled by the use of prescribed fire and harvest selection takes into account many factors including sustained yield and aesthetics. The open park-like structure that results from this management largely fits the description of early explorers to the region, including William Bartram who wrote, "...a forest of the great long-leaved pine, the earth covered with grass, interspersed with an infinite variety of herbaceous plants, and embellished with extensive savannas."

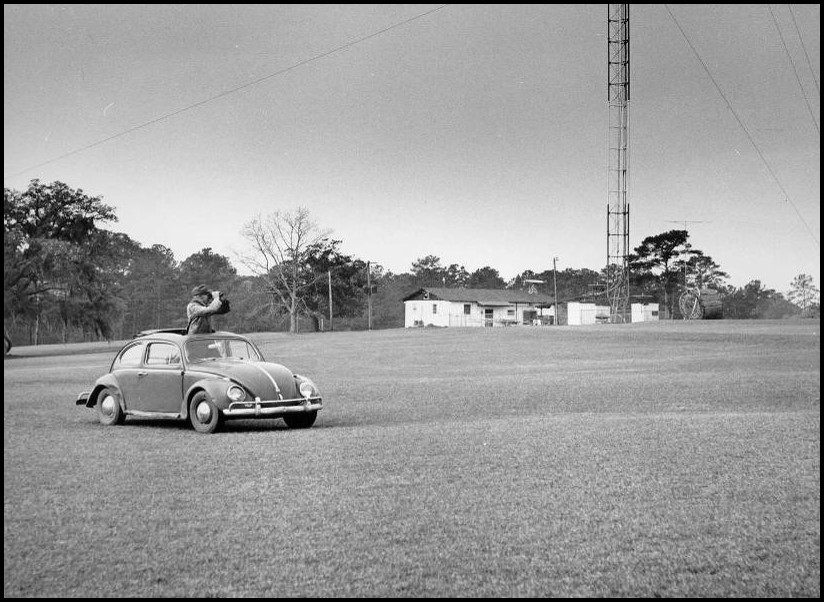
Stoddard looking for bird carcasses from his Volkswagen Beetle

In 1955, Stoddard initiated a study of birds killed by the recently erected WCTV transmission tower in northwest Florida. TV and radio towers were known to kill large numbers of birds, so Stoddard set out to document total numbers, species, timing, and spatial distribution of the kills. Almost daily for 28 years, Stoddard, his assistant Robert A. Norris, and others visited the cleared area below the tower to pick up bird carcasses, primarily songbirds, and record data. Stoddard often did this by scanning the area from the open top of a Volkswagen Beetle. Stoddard's bird study documented mass kills of birds that collided with the guy wires and the tower itself. In one instance, Stoddard documented the death of over 800 birds on September 19, 1962. Over the length of the study, over 44,000 individual birds were collected representing 186 species. Many valuable insights were gained from his study including the documentation of several rare species migrating through the area that were previously unknown, as well as the factors that affect the rate at which birds incur mortality. These insights have been used to provide guidelines for reducing avian mortality at communication tower sites, as well as to estimate the total impact that towers may have on bird populations across the United States and Canada. Man-made structures remain one the largest causes of mortality for songbirds in the United States.

=== The Red Hills ===
Stoddard made his entry into wildlife management on a landscape known as the Red Hills Region of southern Georgia and north Florida. The Red Hills occupy an area covering parts of five counties across the southern border of Georgia and northern border of Florida. It is bounded on the west by the Ochlockonee River, on the south by the Cody Scarp, on the east by the watershed of the Aucilla River, and on the north by the Tifton Upland of Georgia. The history of this region provided a unique setting for Stoddard to study. The Red Hills became a refuge for northerners seeking warming climes during the winter months and purported health benefits of breathing the air of the piney woods. Those with the means—and suffering from long winters or diseases such as tuberculosis—found the southern atmosphere charming and therapeutic. In short time, these visitors began to recreate by seeking hunting opportunities, particularly the pursuit of northern bobwhite quail. Not long after their initial arrival, these wealthy visitors began purchasing land in the region, and by 1930, owned over 250,000 acres of land used for hunting.

The mark of wealthy industrialists is still evident in the landowners that occupy this region to this day. Descendants of the Ford family, Western Union Telegraph founders, Vanderbilts, the New York Herald Tribune owner, and others still own, or recently owned, property in the Red Hills. Many properties are now under conservation easements, which restrict development and incentivize owners with tax breaks. This new conservation culture in the region is playing an important role in a landscape-level preservation strategy for some of last remnants of the longleaf pine ecosystem.

=== Wildlife Management and Prescribed Fire ===
Among Stoddard's friends and colleagues was famed author and conservationist Aldo Leopold. While Leopold is often regarded as the founder of wildlife management, Leopold himself thought that distinction belonged to Stoddard by remarking, "Herbert Stoddard, in Georgia, started the first management of wildlife based on research." Despite being a high school drop out, his intuition for scientific investigation was keen. One of his observational experiments studying the effects of fire frequency, which is still running to this day, was set up in a near-block design allowing for the control of potential nuisance variables. Stoddard's intuition was recognized early in his career, which led to his recruitment for the study of bobwhite quail as part of the U. S. Biological Survey.

Fire, controlled or uncontrolled, was considered anathema in the 1920s and many efforts were put forth to extinguish its use within southern woodlands. A large reason for this was the misconception that fires, which were often set annually by African American sharecroppers, were perceived as destroying bobwhite quail habitat that was prized by wealthy landowners. Many of these landowners were from more northern regions and products of the industrial revolution. Around the turn of the 20th century, hunting preserve owners began to dramatically reduce the acreage burned each year. By the late teens and early 1920s, a steep decline in bobwhite numbers began to draw the attention of the wealthy-landowners-turned-hunters. In 1924, the Cooperative Quail Study Investigation was born. Led by Herbert Stoddard, this effort was a jointly-funded effort of the Bureau of Biological Survey several landowners in the region. The purpose was to examine cause of the decline of bobwhite and to find a way to reverse the apparent population trajectory. One of the principal causes for the decline that Stoddard recognized immediately was the decrease in the use of the prescribed fire as a habitat management tool.

Among this was a man named Henry Beadel, the son of a northern industrialist.

=== Cultural Landscapes and Ecosystem Management ===
Recent work on Stoddard (and the most comprehensive examination of his life and work to date) argues that not only was he a champion for putting fire back on the landscape and one of the first to conduct active wildlife management, but he was also one of the first to recognize that cultural landscapes could harbor substantial ecological diversity. The intersection of these three components forms the foundation of ecosystem management.
