= Abraham B. Jacob =

Dutch Jewish engraver

Abraham Ben Jacob was a Dutch Jewish engraver who worked in Amsterdam in the 17th century.

Ben Jacob, a German man who converted to Judaism and moved to Amsterdam, is best known for his engravings for the so-called Amsterdam Haggadah (1695), a haggadah whose popularity lasted until the 18th century, judging by the number of times the book was reprinted. Ben Jacob made the engravings from a Christian text that was illustrated by the Swiss artist Matthäus Merian.

He was generally held to be the printer of the first map of the Holy Land in Hebrew, in 1695, though it appears there is an older map, printed by Abraham Goos and designed by Jacob ben Abraham Zaddiq.
