= Abraham Goos =

Dutch cartographer, publisher, and engraver

Abraham Goos (Dutch pronunciation: [ˈaːbraːɦɑm ˈɣoːs]; 1590 – c. 1643) was a Dutch cartographer, publisher, and engraver. He made globes, maps of North America, a comprehensive map of European coastlines, and the first printed Hebrew language map of The Holy Land.

== Early life and family ==
Abraham Goos (born about 1590) was the son of Pieter Goos, a diamond cutter, and Margriete van den Keere. Through his mother he was related to the engraver Pieter van den Keere (Petrus Kaerius).

His first teacher was the engraver and cartographer Jodocus Hondius (1563–1612), who was related to Goos by marriage.

He married Stijntgen Theunisdr de Ram ("Stijntje Teunis") in 1614 in Haarlem. Goos lived on the Nieuwendijk in Amsterdam, and by 1615 had moved to the Kalverstraat, in "'t Vergulde Caertboeck".

The couple had several children, including the engraver and publisher Pieter Goos (1616–1675), as well as another son, Abraham Goos (baptized 1621), and a daughter, Cathalyna Goos (baptized 1623).

== Career ==
After training under the engraver and cartographer Jodocus Hondius (1563–1612), Goos began his professional career in Amsterdam in the early seventeenth century.

After Hondius died, his son-in-law Jan Janssonius took over Hondius's business and continued the partnership with Goos. One of Hondius' specialties was the manufacture of globes, and Goos and Janssonius continued this work, regularly modifying the globes as new geographical information became available.

With his cousin Pieter van den Keere (in Latin, Petrus Kaerius; Goos's mother was van den Keere's sister), Goos engraved the globe of Petrus Plancius in 1614. Goos became known as a specialist engraver and for the accuracy of his work. He also engraved maps for several publishers, including the English cartographer John Speed.

In 1616, Goos published the Nieuw Nederlandtsch Caertboeck, one of the first atlases of the Netherlands. He was paid 120 guilders by the States General of the Netherlands. The atlas was republished in 1625.

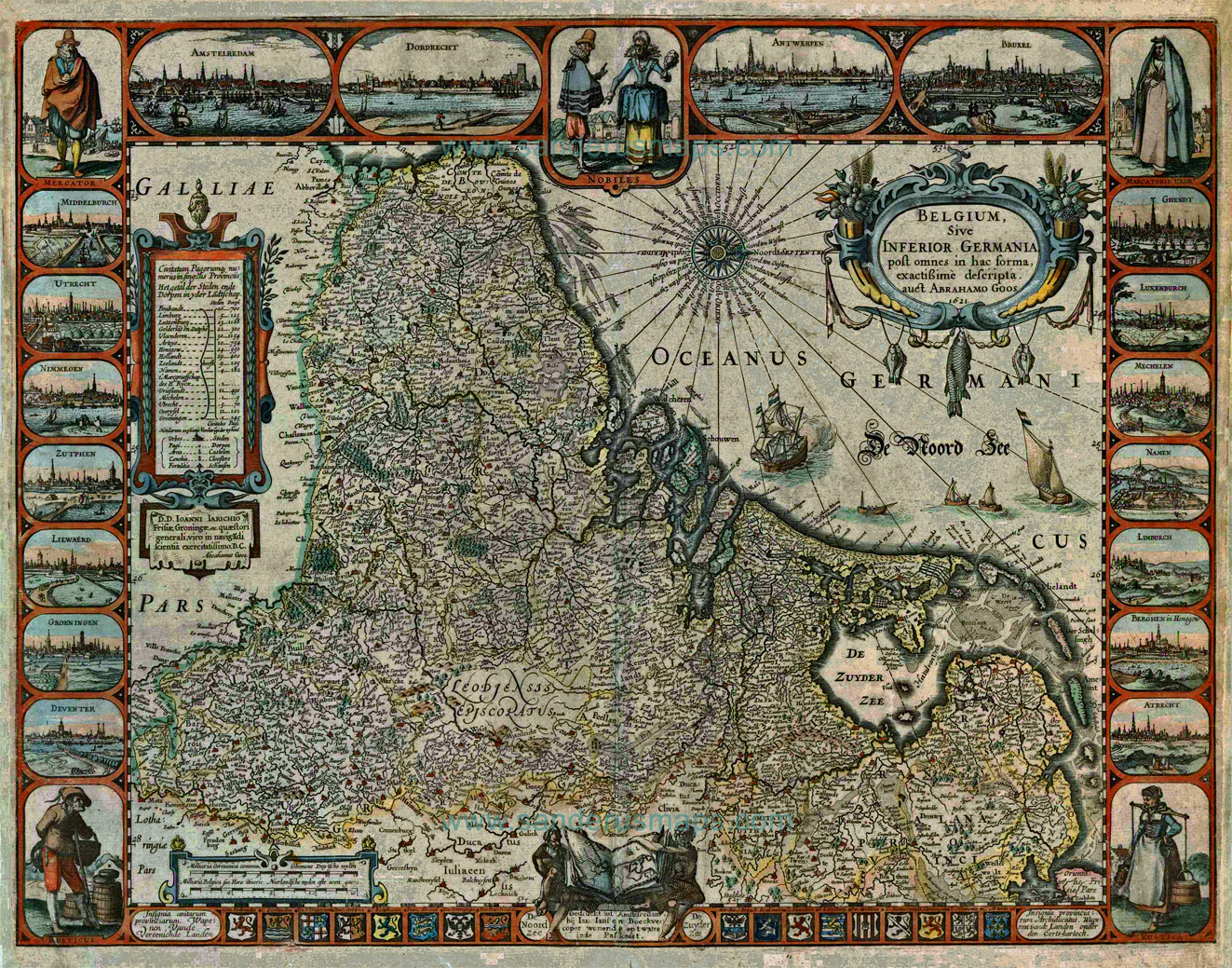
Belgium Sive Inferior Germania, 1621. "Leodiensis Episcopatus", below the center of the image, is the area of the Liège diocese.

Janssonius and Goos collaborated until the latter's death. In 1619 Janssonius printed Goos's Novus tabularum geographicarum Belgicae liber in Amsterdam, and Goos engraved seven maps for Janssonius's atlas of Germany.

In 1620 Goos engraved a map of Europe's coasts, with a separate map showing parts of Greenland, Spitsbergen, and Nova Zembla; the maps were drawn by Harmen and Marten Jansz.

A year later Janssonius issued a globe engraved by Goos, and in the same year he published Goos's map of the Seventeen Provinces, Belgium Sive Inferior Germania post omnes in hac forma, exactissime descripta, based on a 1608 map by Willem Blaeu. The map is notable because the Liège diocese was deliberately omitted, since it was not part of the Seventeen Provinces.

The map also records contemporary land-reclamation projects, indicating the drainage of lakes that would form three polders: the Beemster, the Purmer, and the Zijpe- en Hazepolder. In a later edition published by Janssonius, some of these lakes were shown filled in with parcels.

== Cartographic works ==
With Jacob ben Abraham Zaddiq, he printed what is called the first map of the Holy Land in Hebrew, in 1620/21. It was thought that a Jewish engraver in Amsterdam named Abraham B. Jacob was the first one to do so, in 1695. The map is cited as an example of "Jewish authors creat[ing] artistic maps as part of their encounter with Christian society". (An earlier, much more schematic map not drawn to scale is a woodcut from Mantua, from the 1560s, with Hebrew designations.)

Another first is his 1624 map of North America, published in Amsterdam; it is "the first major map to depict California as a distinct island" (though it does not mention "California"). It is the first to name the Hudson River, among other landmarks. Whether it really predates the map by Henry Briggs, published in 1625 in London, is a matter of some contention; it has been argued (based on a note from 1622, which said California was an island) that Briggs had sent a draft of a map to his Amsterdam publisher, which in turn influenced Goos. Maps of his are published in various editions of the Atlas minor version of Gerard Mercator's 1595 (folio) atlas, starting in 1628 (Jodocus Hondius had acquired the copper plates from Mercator's son in 1604).

== Death ==
His death date is unknown, though it was likely before 1643.

== Maps by Abraham Goos ==
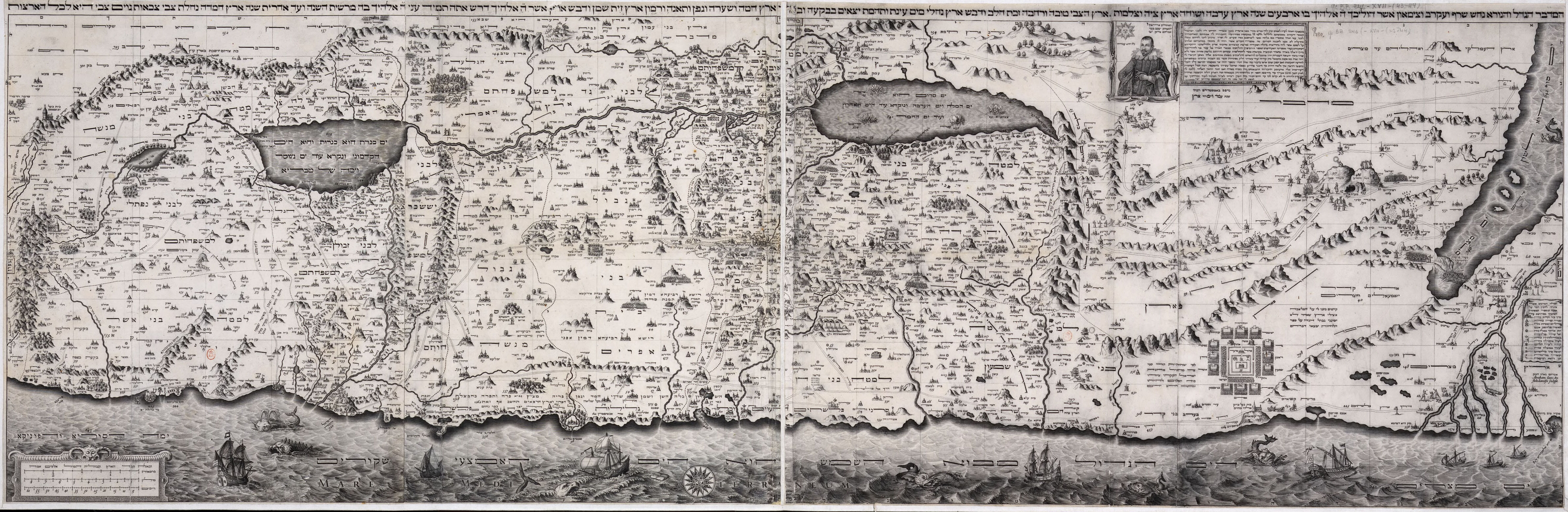
Map of the Holy Land in Hebrew, 1620

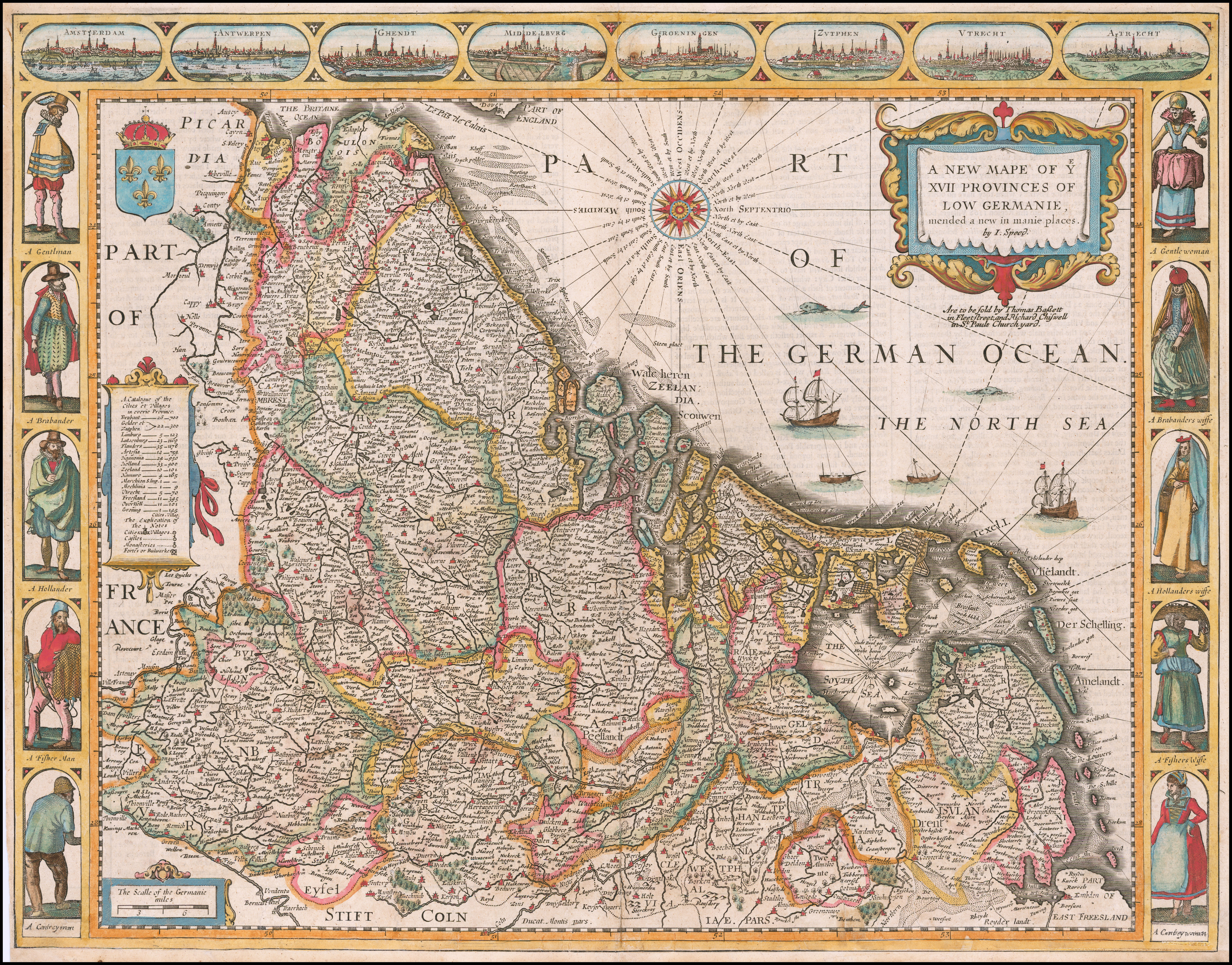
Map of the Seventeen Provinces, published by I. Speed, 1626

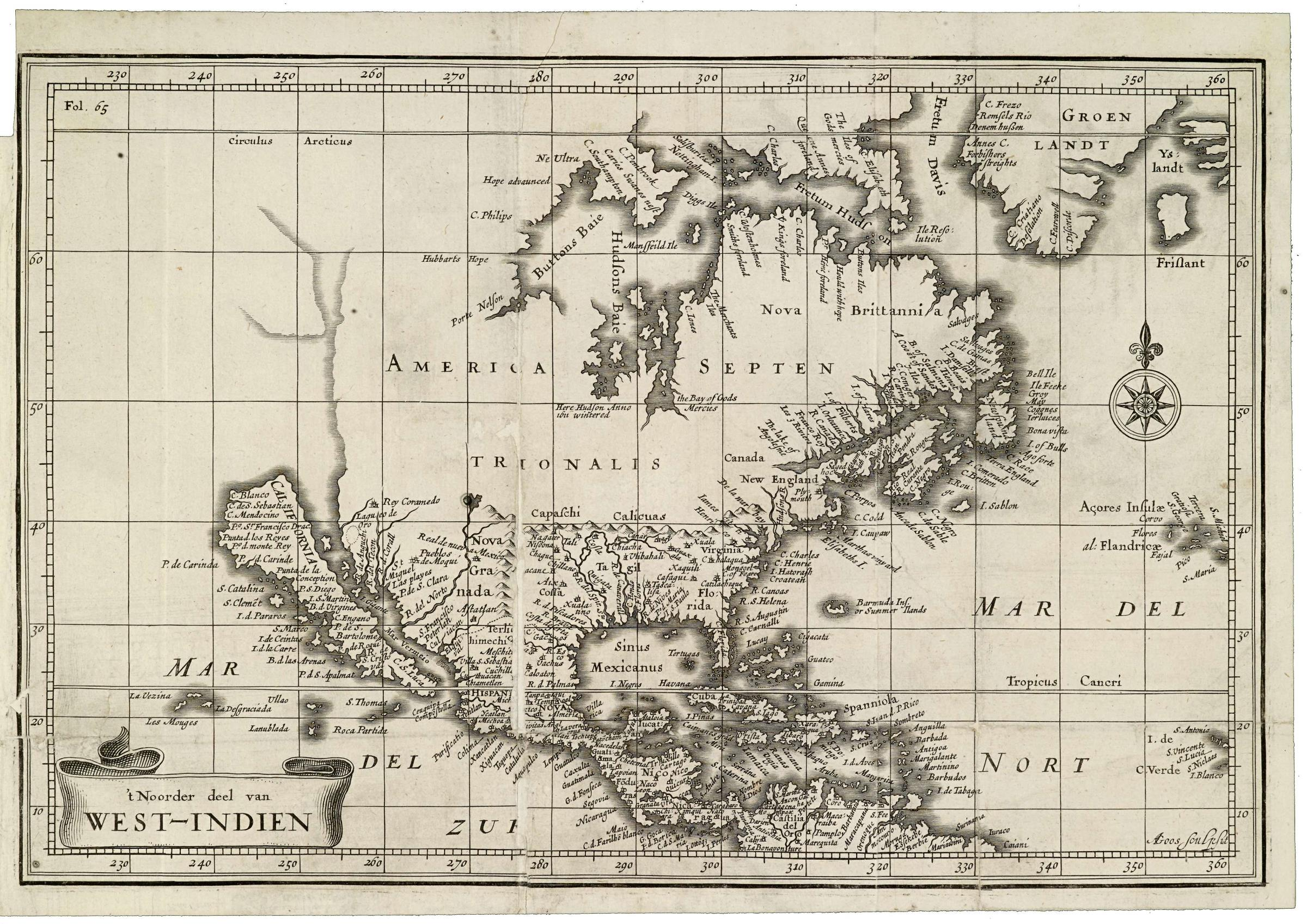
North America and the Caribbean, 1624

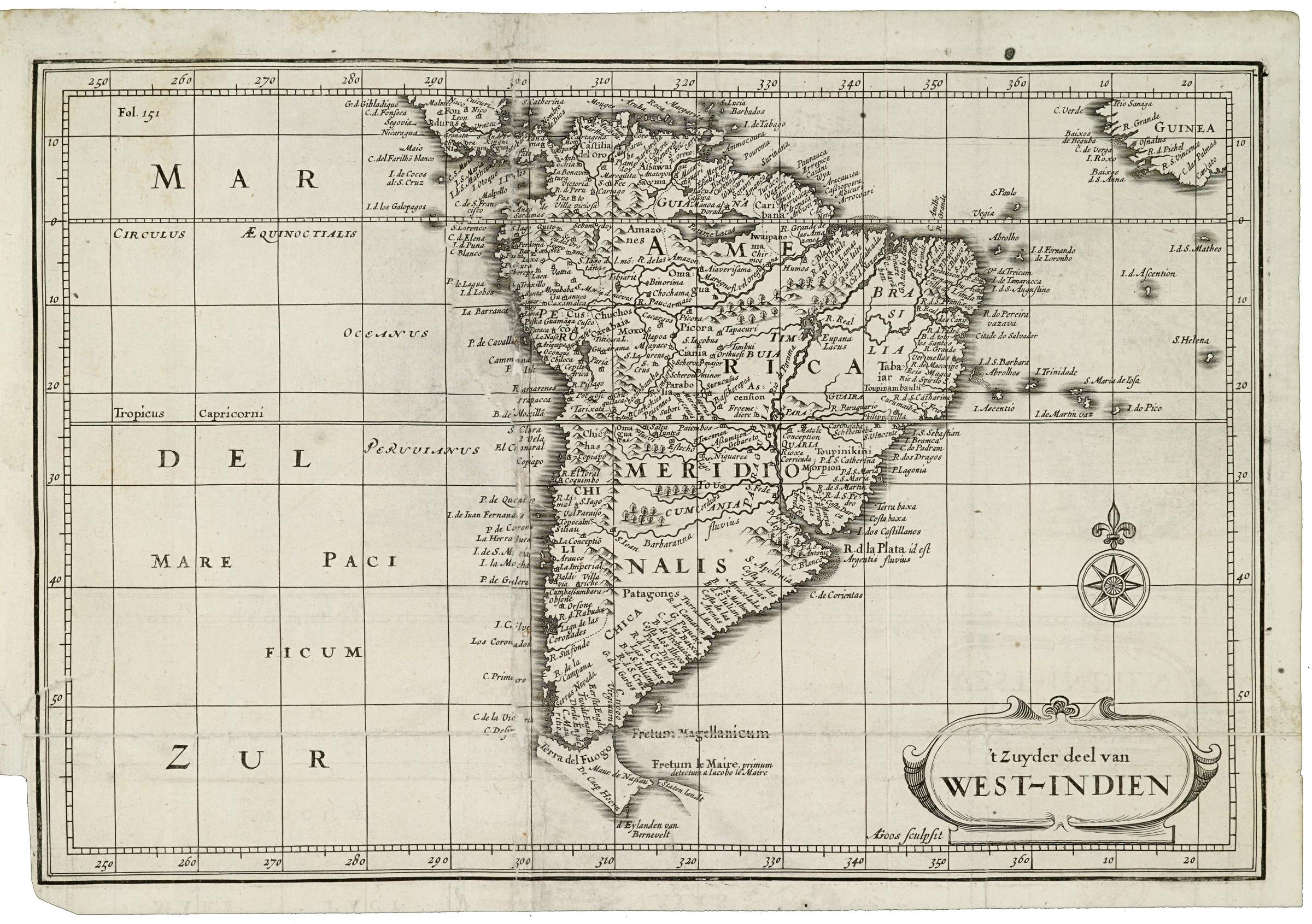
South America, 1624

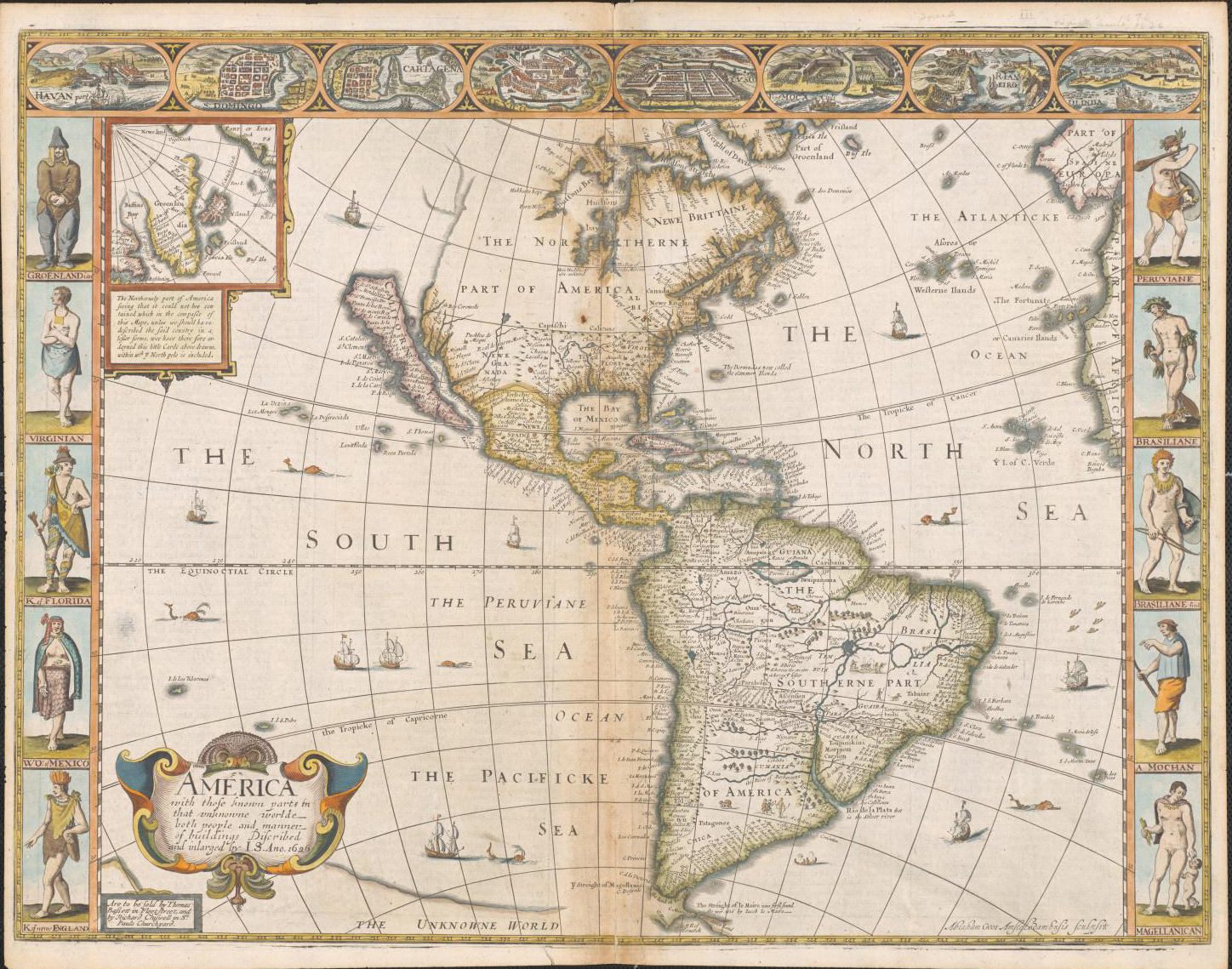
America, 1626

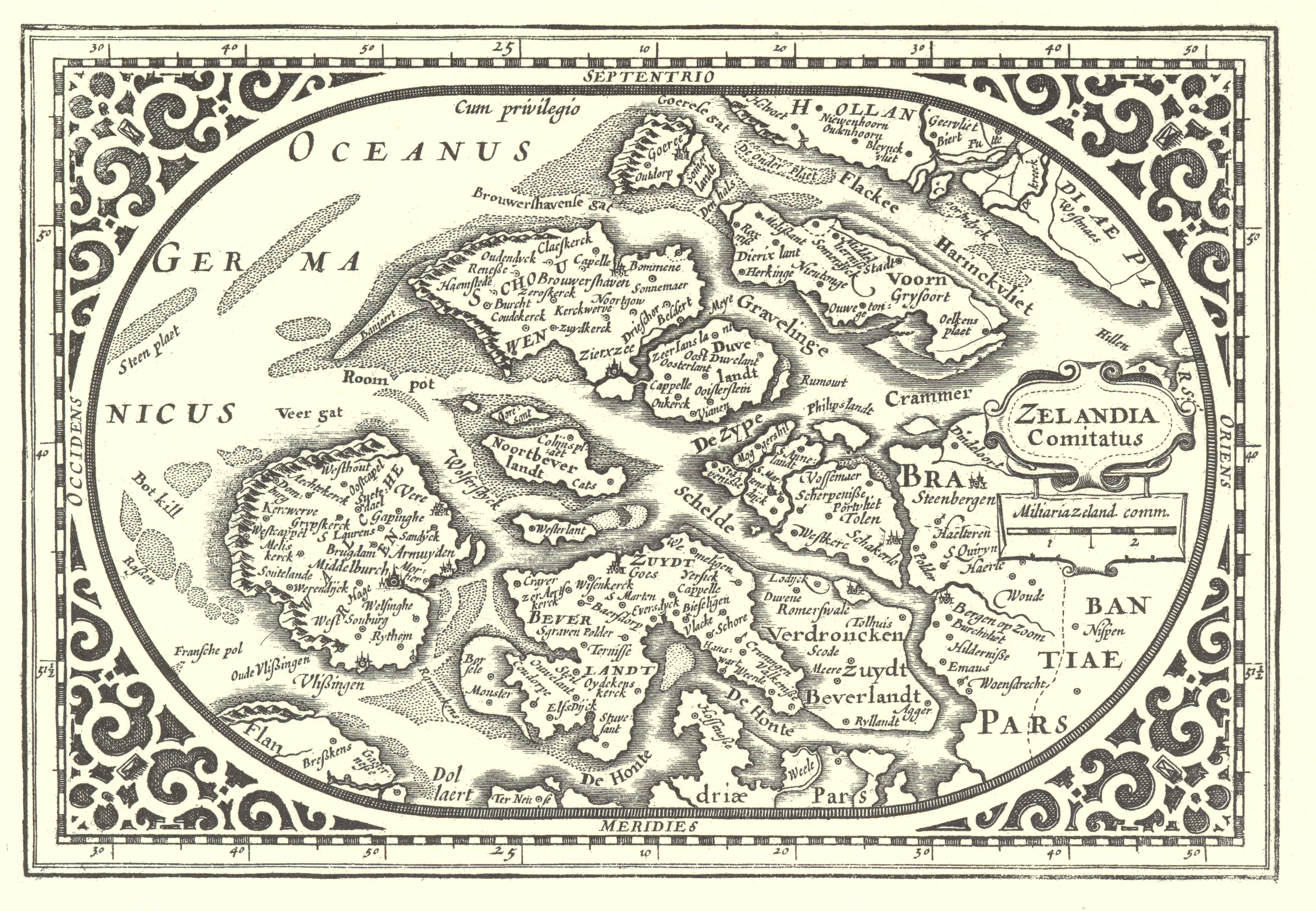
Zeelandia, from Nieuw Nederlandtsch Caertboeck, 1625

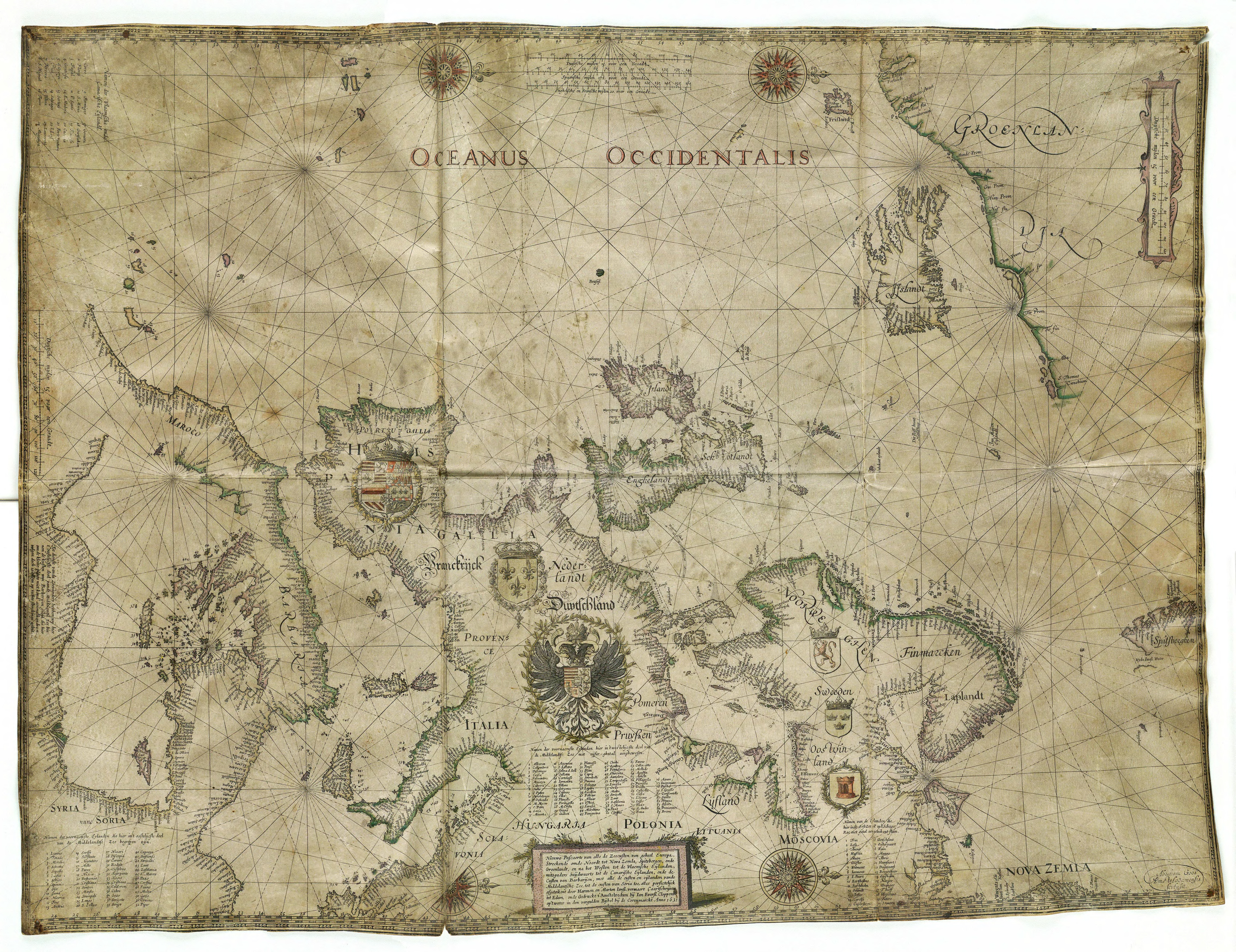
Map of the European coasts, 1631
