= Amsterdam Haggadah =

Illustrated Jewish Passover service book

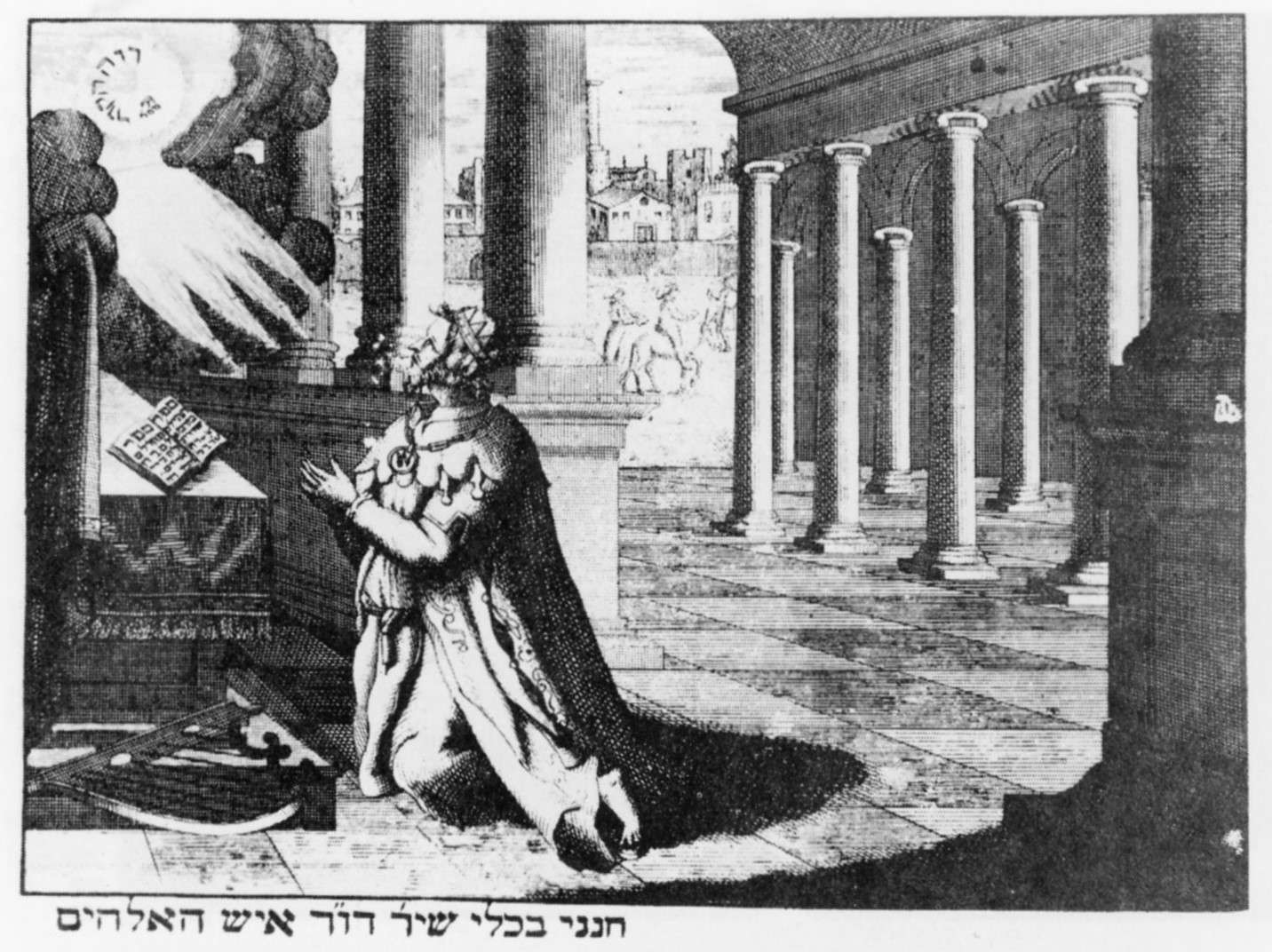
David with harp, from the 1712 edition

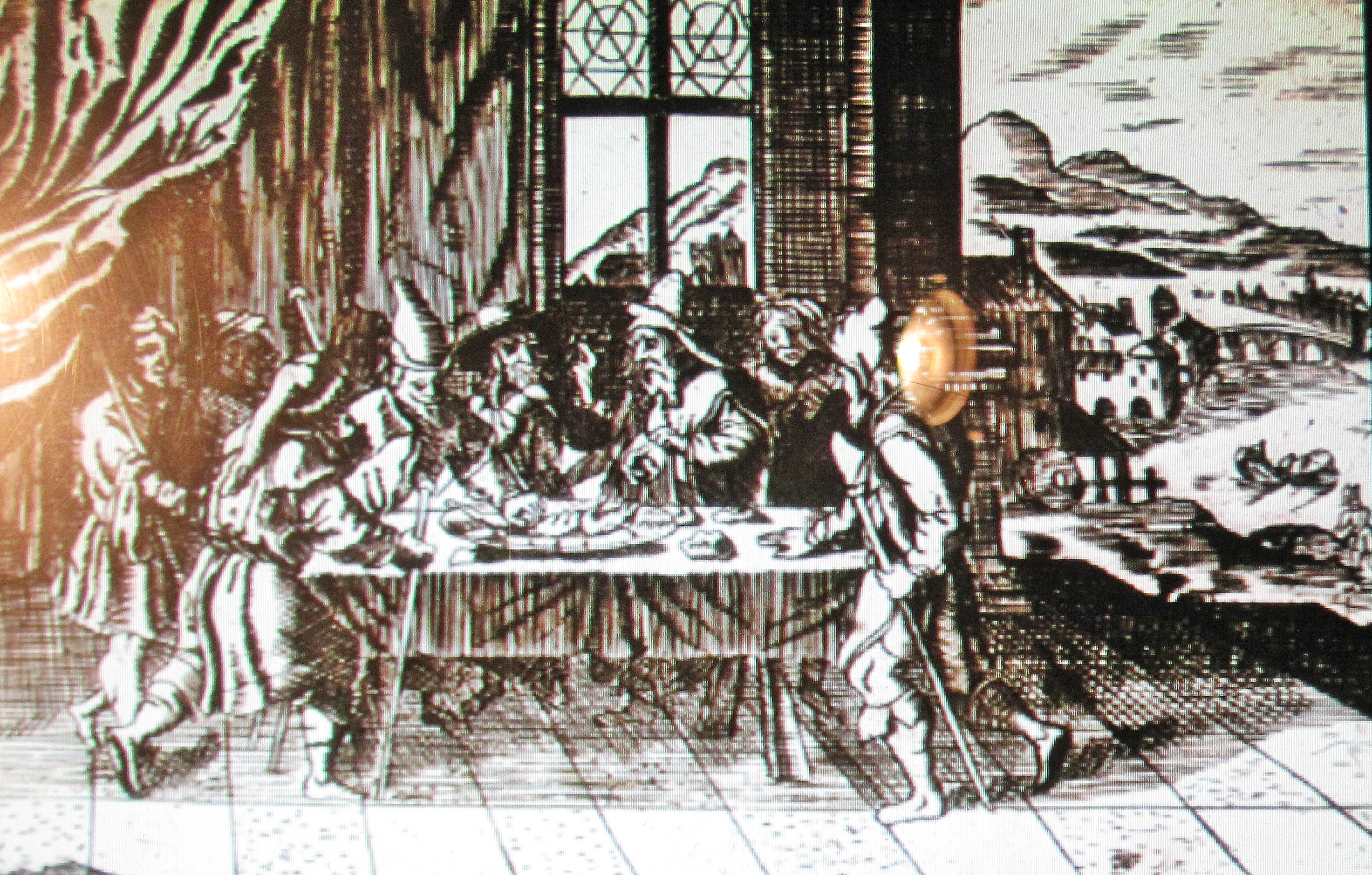
The sages reclining in Bnei Brak (1712 edition)

The Amsterdam Haggadah is an illustrated and annotated edition of the Passover Haggadah, the text that accompanies the Passover Seder. It was first printed in Amsterdam in 1695, and a second edition with only minor changes followed in 1712. It is notable for its copperplate illustrations by Abraham B. Jacob, which include one of the earliest printed maps of the Holy Land.

The Haggadah was printed at the press of Asher Anshel ben Eliezer Hazan and Issachar Ber ben Abraham Eliezer, with financing from Moses ben Joseph Wesel.

== Description ==
The Haggadah comprises a title page, 26 pages of text, 137 illustrations and a map. The map shows the route taken by Jacob and his sons down to Egypt, the route by which the Israelites returned to the land, and the territories of the tribes. It is printed across the centre of the book and folds out to the size of two pages.

The text was printed by letterpress. The Hebrew typeface designed for the Haggadah was highly regarded and became known as "Amsterdam letters". The illustrations and the map were produced as copperplate engravings in black and white, without colour or decoration.

== Texts ==
The text of the Haggadah is printed in the centre of the page in large, vocalised square Hebrew letters. The outer margins carry the commentary of Isaac Abarbanel in Rashi script, and the bottom margins carry a kabbalistic commentary, the "commentary according to the secret", in small square letters. The commentaries are not vocalised. Each illustration has a caption, usually a verse from the Hebrew Bible, printed in small square letters without vowels.

The Haggadah combines the Sephardi and Ashkenazi rites. For that reason it gives instructions to the leader of the Seder in Judeo-Italian, Yiddish and Ladino. Headings mark where the rites differ, such as "until here the Sephardi custom, and the Ashkenazim continue". The songs "Adir Hu", "Echad Mi Yodea" and "Chad Gadya", which were sung only by Ashkenazim, are accompanied by Yiddish translations.

== Illustrations ==
The copperplate engravings broke with the long tradition of Haggadah illustration. The cycle of illustrations opens with the sages "who were reclining in Bnei Brak all that night". It omits the familiar scenes of preparation for Passover, such as the search for leaven, the baking of matzah, the family reclining around the Seder table and the father reciting the blessing.

In preparing the engravings, Abraham B. Jacob drew on the work of the Swiss artist Matthäus Merian the Elder, whose illustrations for the New Testament and for history books were well known across Europe. He adapted the figures and their clothing, and combined figures from different illustrations to create new scenes suited to the Haggadah, while leaving the backgrounds unchanged.

The innovations of the Amsterdam Haggadah became a landmark in Haggadah illustration. They influenced many later editions, including Amsterdam Haggadahs of 1721 and 1741, the Hamburg–Amsterdam Haggadah of 1728, and later Haggadahs printed in Europe and the United States into the 20th century.
