= Pieter Goos =

Dutch cartographer and publisher

- Born: Pieter Goos; 1616; Amsterdam
- Died: 1675 (aged 58–59); Amsterdam
- Children: One son, Henrik Goos
- Parent(s): Father, Abraham Goos and mother Stijntgen Theunisdr de Ram

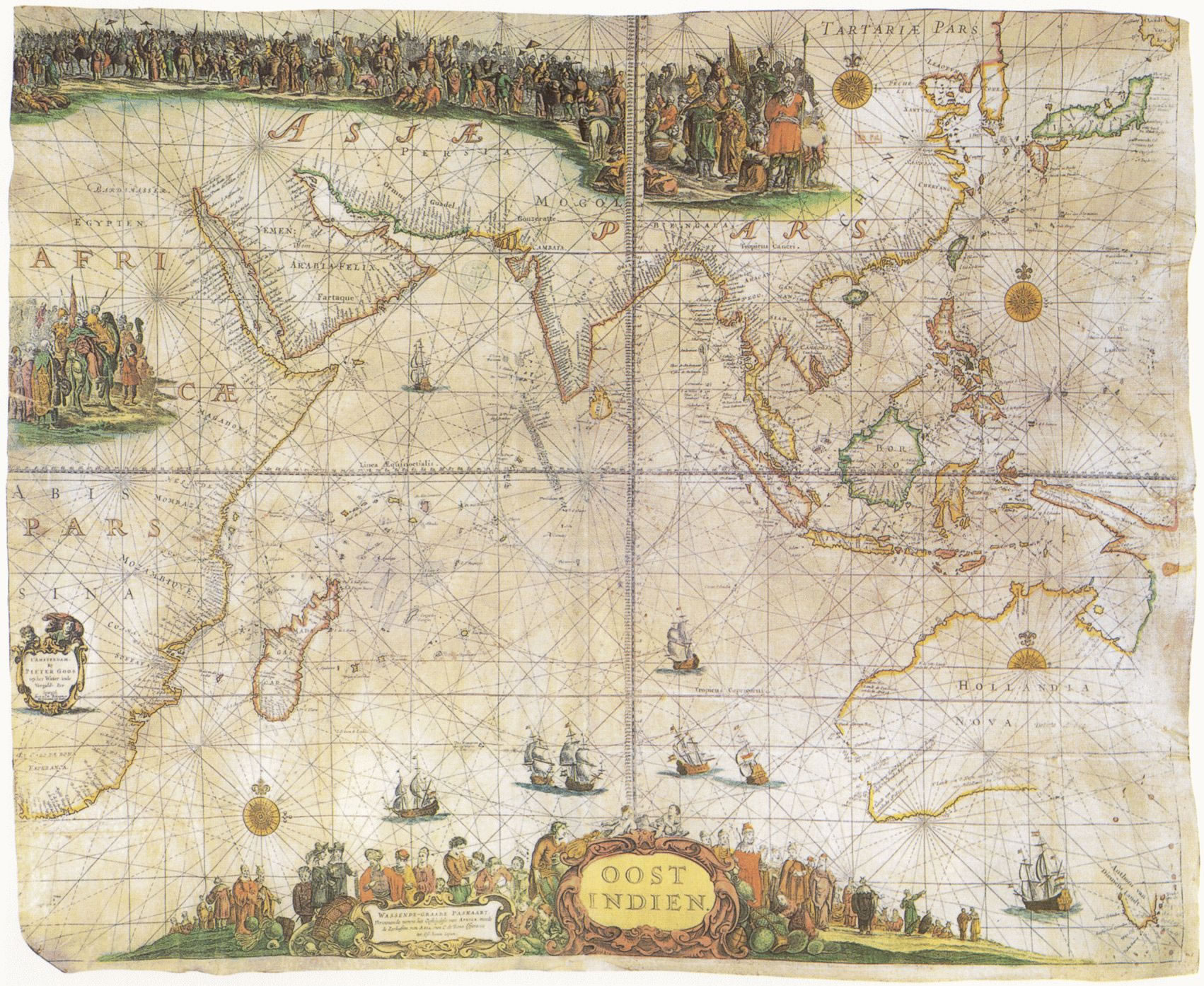
Pieter Goos' map of the East Indies (1660)

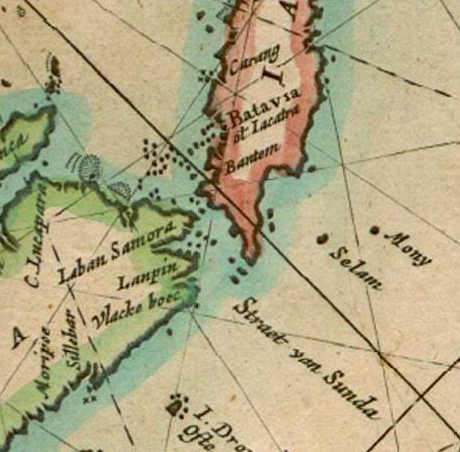
Detail of his East Indies map showing Christmas Island

Pieter Goos (1616–1675) was a Dutch cartographer, copperplate engraver, publisher and bookseller. He was the son of Abraham Goos (1590–1643), also a cartographer and map seller. From 1666, Pieter Goos published a number of well produced atlases. He was the first to map Christmas Island, which he labelled "Mony" in his map of the East Indies, published in his 1666 Zee-Atlas (Sea Atlas). His Atlas ofte Water-Weereld (Atlas or Water World) has been cited as one of the best maritime atlases of its time. Another of his fine works was the Oost Indien (East Indies) map published in 1680.

== Early life and family ==
Goos was born in 1616 into a cartographer's family in Amsterdam, Netherlands. His father, Abraham Goos, was an established cartographer having published globes as well as land and sea maps at Antwerp. His mother was Stijntgen Theunisdr de Ram.

In Antwerp, his father had associated with Jodocus Hondius and Johannes Janssonius. Goos followed in his footsteps, first creating pilot books and then moving into global sea atlases to assist navigation. His son, Henrik Goos, followed in the family tradition of cartography and publishing.

== Career ==
Goos operated from Amsterdam, which was the focal point of cartography (as Antwerp was affected by war) and also trade during the seventeenth century. The Dutch maps were very detailed, colourful and attractive.

=== Pilot books and navigational manuals ===
Pilot books, which contained a large number of navigation charts, were published by many authors, including Goos. He had a notarized agreement with two others, Jacob Lootsman and Hendrick Doncker, to publish pilot books for navigation along the Mediterranean coast, also covering easterly and westerly navigational routes. These were called the Dutch pilot books and remained valid for the period from 1643 to 1680.

Goos was also instrumental in publishing the first pilot book for coastlines outside Europe. A further improvement over the pilot books in Dutch cartography was the publication of sea atlases covering the whole world. Initiated in 1659 by Doncker, the approach was also adopted by Goos from 1666.

One of his larger works is named le grand & nouveau miroir ou flambeau de la mer (1662). In the same year, Goos published "The Lighting Colomne or Sea-Mirrour", which not only contained nautical charts, but also "a brief instruction of the art of navigation".

=== Sea atlases and world mapping ===
Goos' famous world map titled Atlas ofte Water-Weereld was in two parts, one for each hemisphere. The colourful presentation included the two poles. His maritime maps encompassed not only Europe, Great Britain and Ireland but also the North Sea and the Baltic Sea.

The Zee Atlas covered the English Channel, the Mediterranean and the Arctic Ocean as well as the Indian and Pacific Oceans.

He also published regional maps covering the coastal areas of all the continents, facilitating navigation by including details of sandbars, sea depths and the islands near the coast.

A particular feature of the Goos maps was that they were embellished with "large descriptive cartouches" supplemented with sketches of ships, compass cards, and wind roses. His sea atlas of 1666, one of the most complete maritime atlases in existence in the second half of the seventeenth century, contained a frontispiece which featured ships in combat.

Printed on thick paper with gilding, people bought the colourful maps just to decorate their offices and homes. At least one of Goos' atlases was published by his widow.

=== Reception and later influence ===
The maps of Goos and Gerard van Keulen were used exclusively during the eighteenth century until 1740. They were, however, found to have deficiencies such as the location of sandbars, grand banks and islands in the Gulf of St. Lawrence, with inaccuracies of as much as 44 leagues on the reduced Goos maps.

== Gallery ==
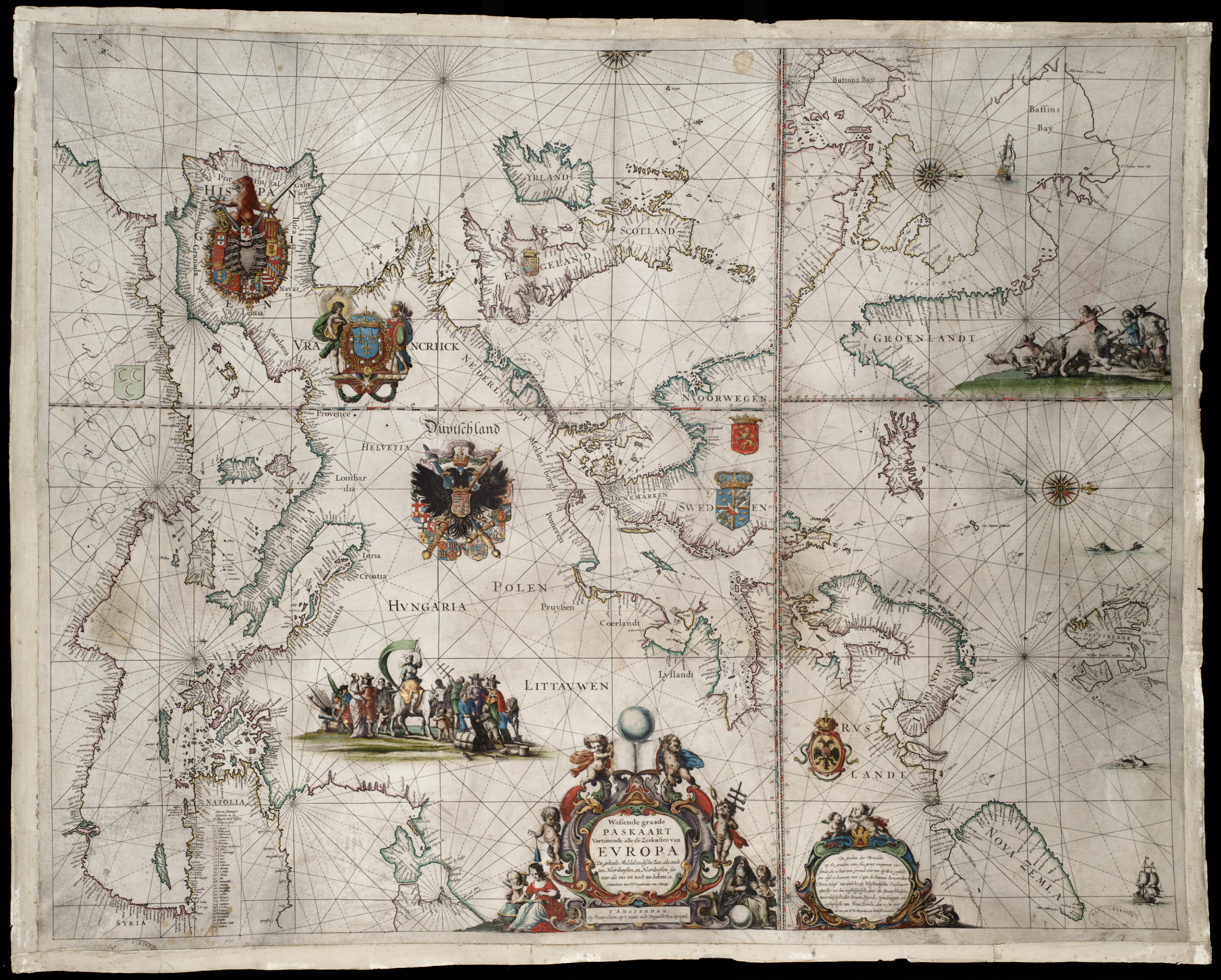
1658 Paskaart Europa: Pieter Goos

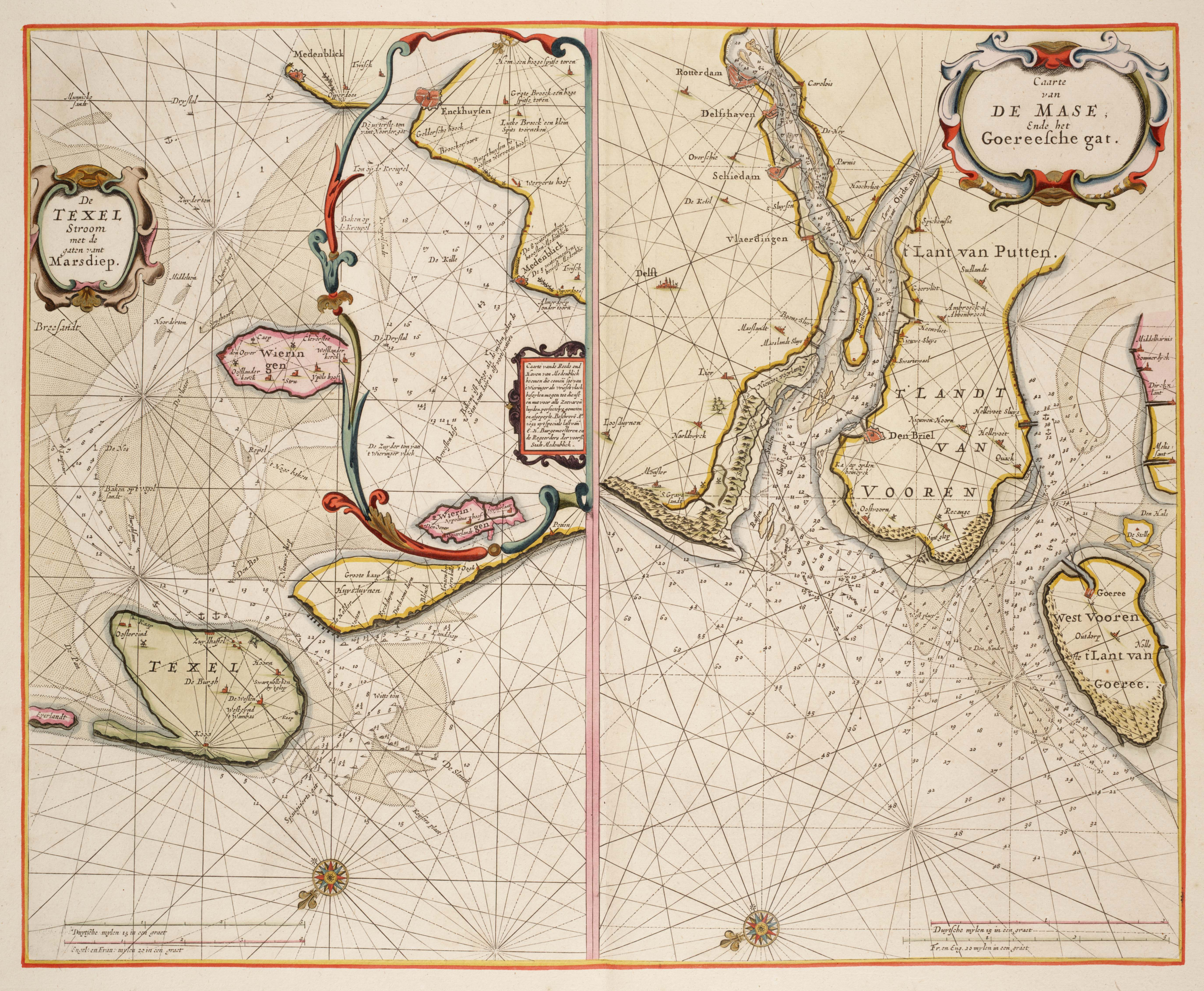
1660 De Texel Stroom & De Mase: Pieter Goos

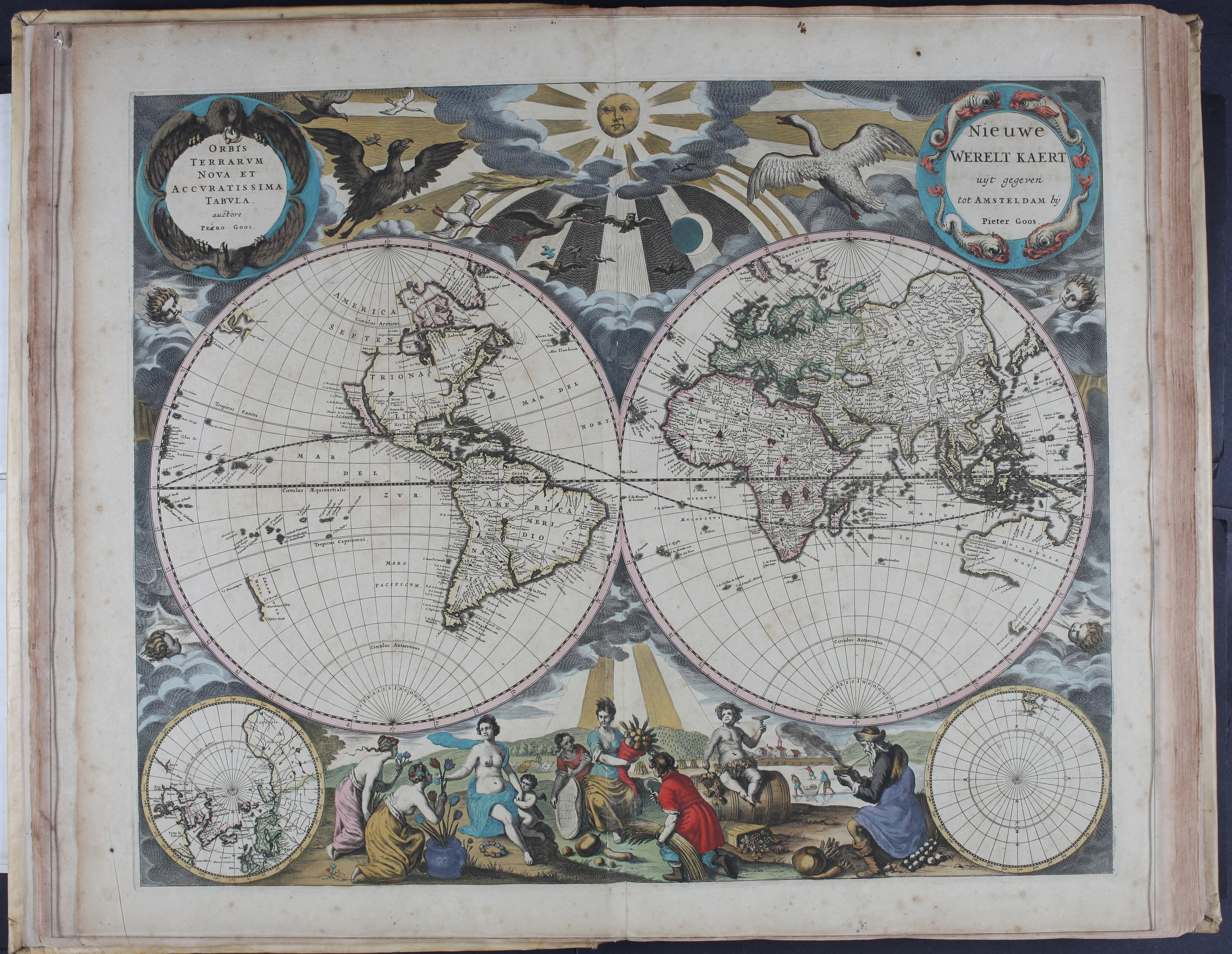
1666 Orbis Terrarum (World Map): Pieter Goos

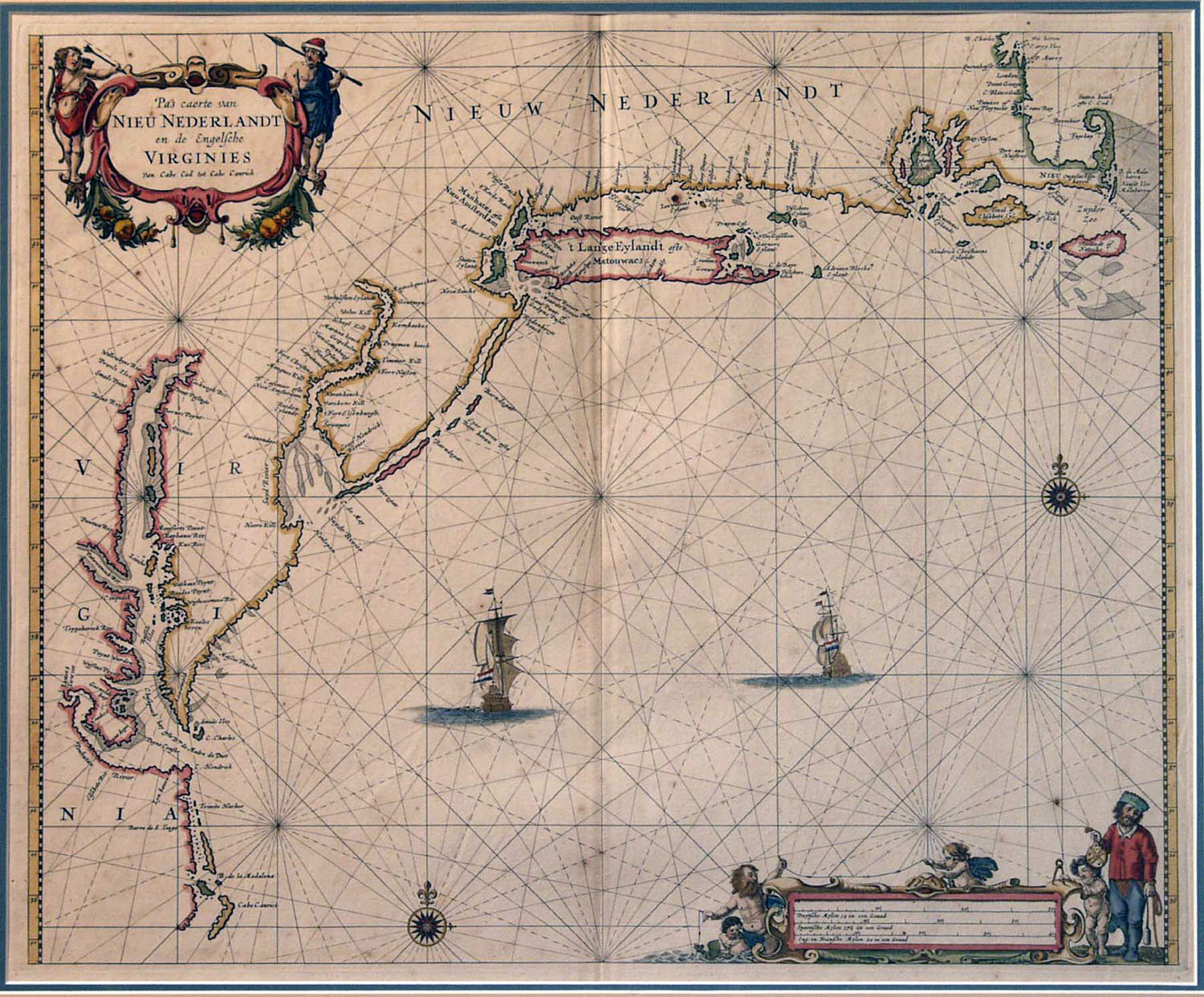
1666 Nieu Nederlandt (New Netherland): Pieter Goos

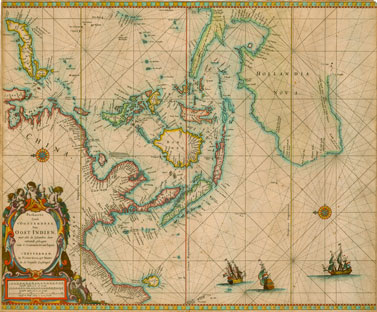
map of south Asia, southwest Asia, Australia, and the Indian Ocean
