= Jacob ben Abraham Zaddiq =

Dutch Jewish merchant

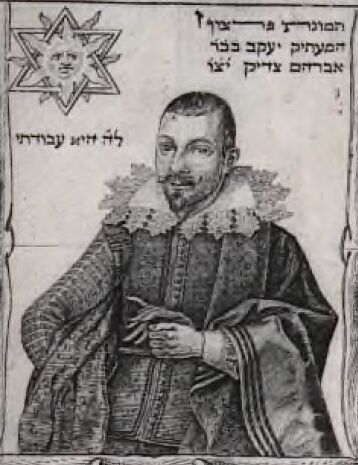
Portrait of Zaddiq extracted from his map of Canaan

Jacob ben Abraham Zaddiq (Hebrew: יעקב בן אברהם צדיק; also written Zaddik, and known under the Latinized name Jacob Justo) was a Dutch Jewish merchant of Portuguese descent who worked in Amsterdam in the early 17th century.

== Biography ==
Zaddiq was a Portuguese-Jewish banker and merchant whose community moved to Amsterdam following the 1579 Union of Utrecht. He was married to Gracia da Costa (in Hebrew, Rita Zaddiq) both had come from Hamburg to Amsterdam.

== Map of the Land of Israel ==
=== Production ===
Zaddiq is responsible, with engraver Abraham Goos, for the first printed map of the Holy Land in Hebrew, produced in Amsterdam in 1620/21. In the framed colophon, the opening line reads: Hebrew: ציור מצב ארצות כנען, lit. 'A Drawing of the Situation of the Lands of Canaan'.

Christian van Adrichem's 1590 map which was copied by Zaddiq

The map was based on the work of the Dutch theologian and cartographer Christian Kruik van Adrichem. In the colophon he prepared for the map, Zaddiq explains that he had copied van Adrichem’s model and translated its captions into Hebrew, adding that he had "carefully checked that every detail would be appropriate for his Jewish audience".

Zaddiq is also described in later sources as the author of a chart of the Land of Israel, originally written in Portuguese under the title Relação do Sítio de Terra de Israel. The work was later published in Latin in Amsterdam and included historical information relating to the places shown.

=== Changes ===
Zaddiq made some significant changes to the original map. It contained a number of illustrations of Jesus's life at the appropriate places in Canaan, which Zaddiq removed—details such as a miniature illustrating the Exorcism of the Gerasene demoniac and one for the Transfiguration of Jesus on Mount Tabor. On the other hand, he added details appropriate to a Jewish audience, including a number of ships that fly historically important flags: a ship near the Nile delta flies a Muslim flag, signifying the Muslim rule over Egypt, and another off the coast of north Sinai flies the Star of David. According to Rehav Rubin, "This Jewish element perhaps gives voice to the author's desire to visit Eretz Yisrael or his deep yearning for the reestablishment of the Judean kingdom".

=== Design ===
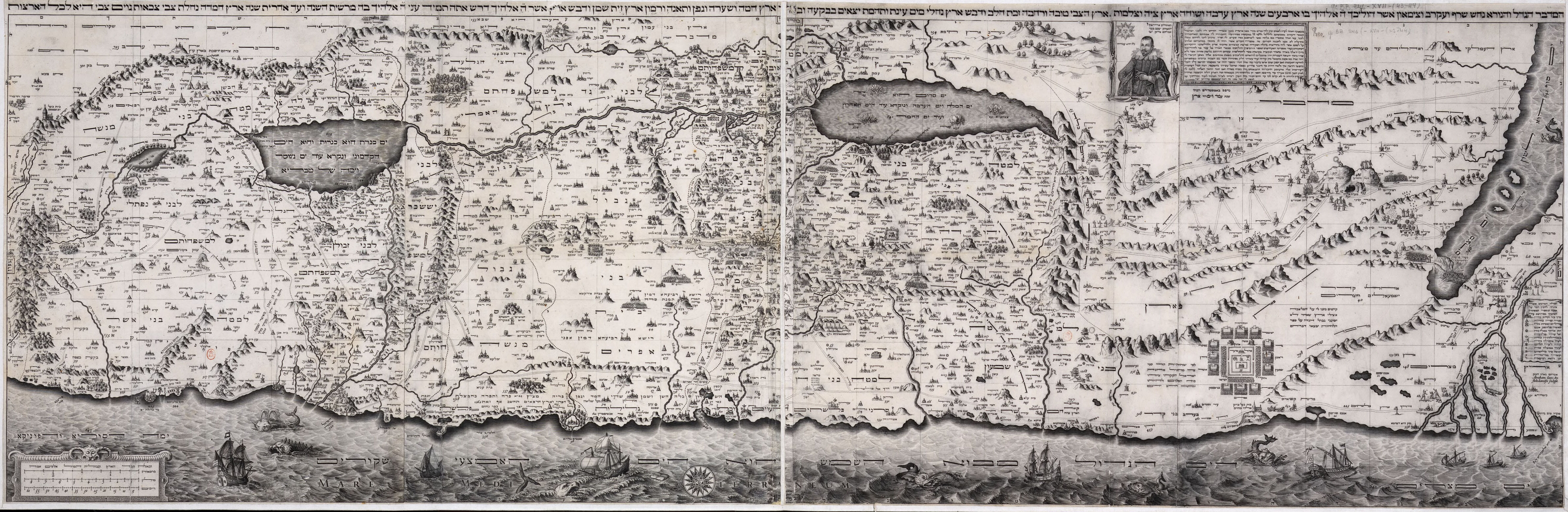
Zaddiq's 1620–21 map of the Holy Land

Zaddiq’s 1620–21 map of the Holy Land combines a map of the region with a large amount of Hebrew text. Unlike the Latin text on the map by van Adrichem, on which it was based, the upper part of Zaddiq's map contains a series of quotations from the Hebrew Bible, including passages from Deuteronomy, Jeremiah, Ezekiel, and Exodus.

The map also includes a detailed explanatory note that describes how it was made and why. It states that the map was engraved in Amsterdam by Abraham Goos and explains that it was intended to help Jewish viewers become more familiar with the Holy Land.

Zaddiq also notes that he included his own portrait so that his audience would "preserve a good keepsake" of him. In this portrait, Zaddiq is shown in the style of a Baroque Spanish courtier, presenting himself in a formal and dignified manner. Zaddiq is described elsewhere as a merchant.

== Legal case ==
Zaddiq was reported to Amsterdam authorities for domestic violence. Witnesses testified that he had beaten his wife with a stick and thrown her down the stairs. He was sentenced to one year in prison.

== See also ==
- Cartography of Palestine
