= Christian van Adrichem =

Catholic priest and theologian (1533–1585)

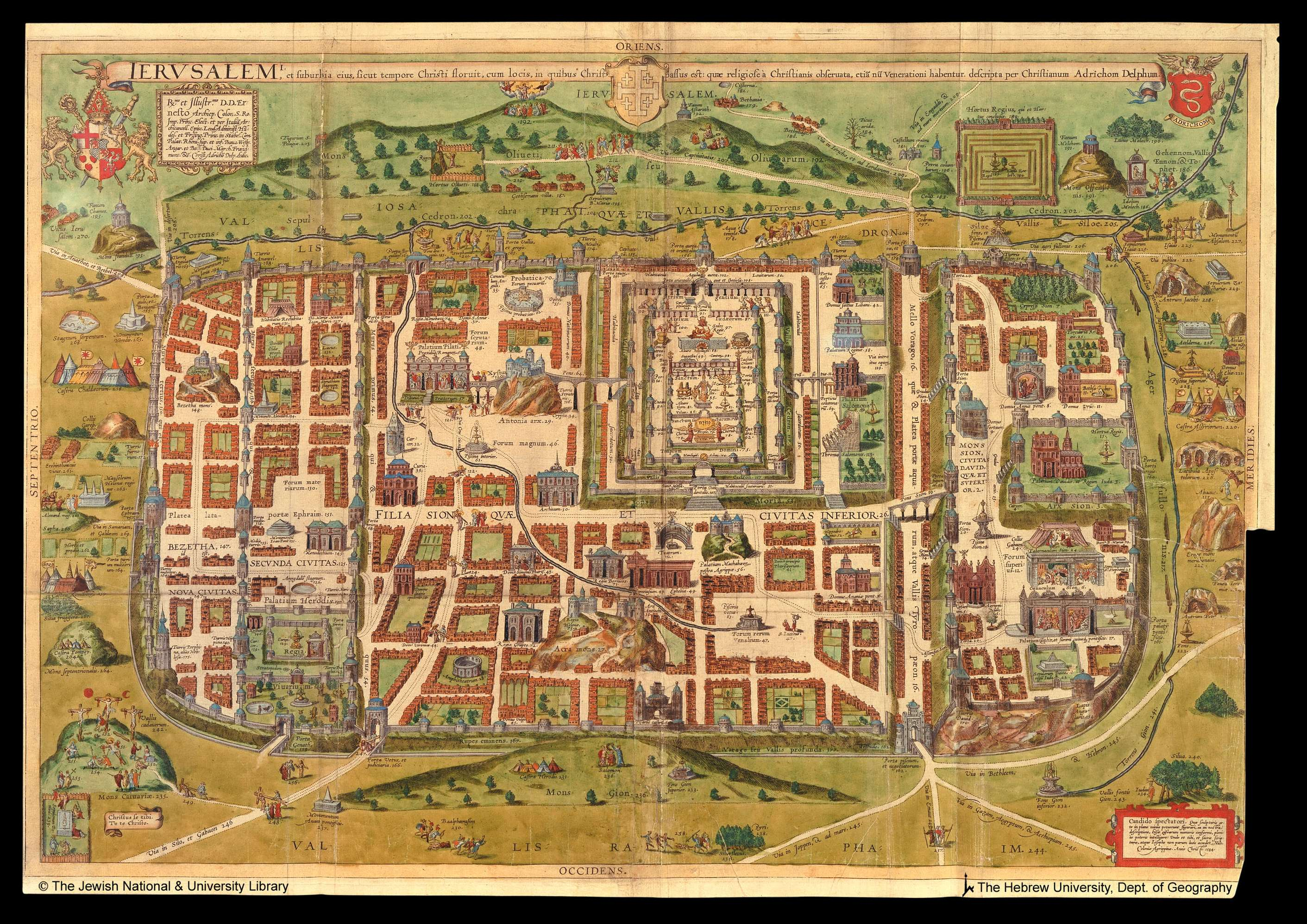
A map of Jerusalem, 1584

Christian Kruik van Adrichem, or Christianus Crucius Adrichomius, (February 13, 1533 – June 20, 1585) was a Catholic priest and theological writer.

== Biography ==
Van Adrichem was born in Delft. He was ordained in 1566, and was Director of the Convent of St. Barbara in Delft before being expelled by the storm of the Reformation. He died in Cologne.

His works are: Vita Jesu Christi (Antwerp, 1578) and Theatrum Terrae Sanctae et Biblicarum Historiarum (Cologne, 1590). This last work gives a description of Palestine, of the antiquities of Jerusalem, and a chronology from Adam till the death of John the Apostle in 109.

== Gallery from original 1590 edition of Theatrum Terrae Sanctae et Biblicarum Historiarum ==

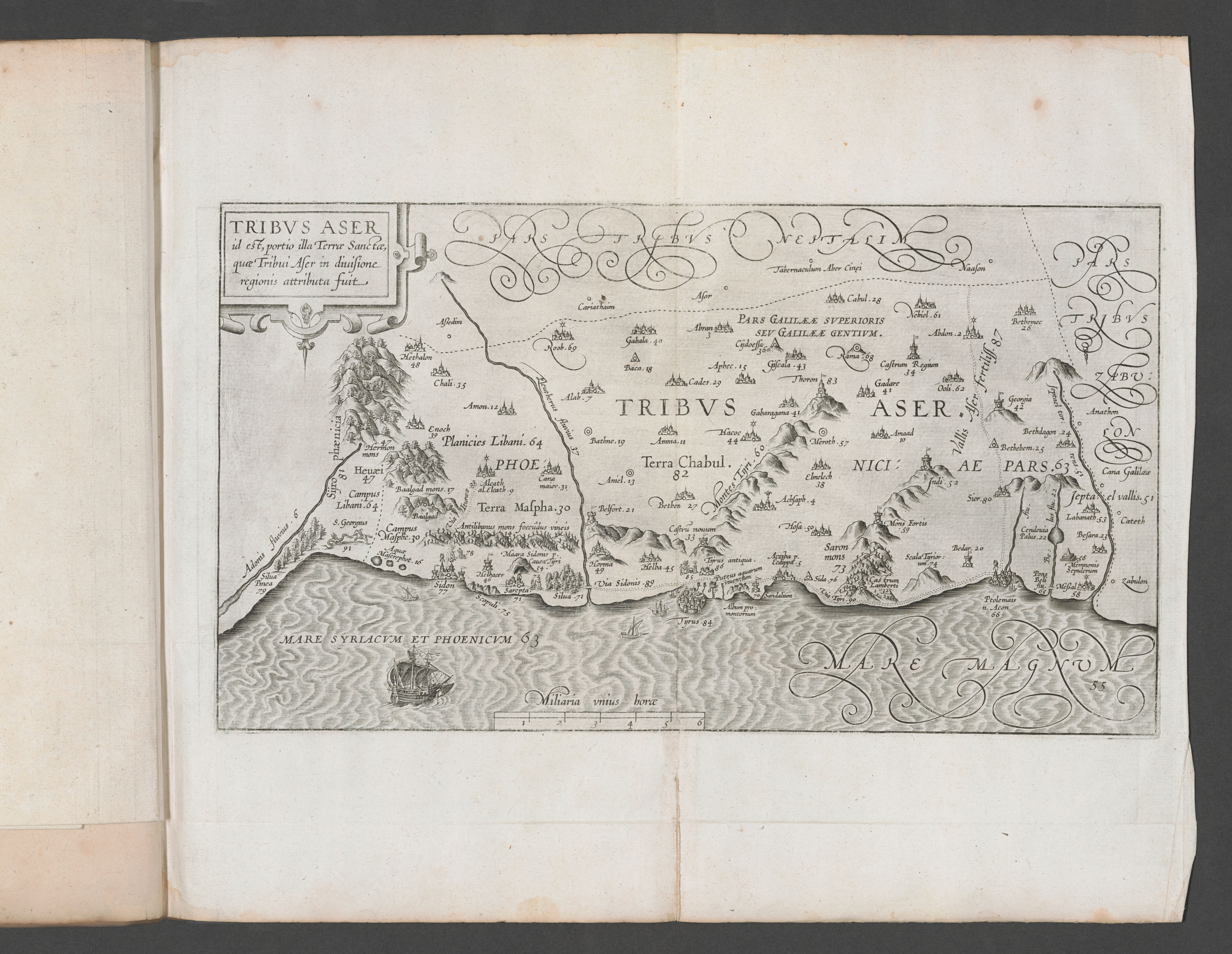

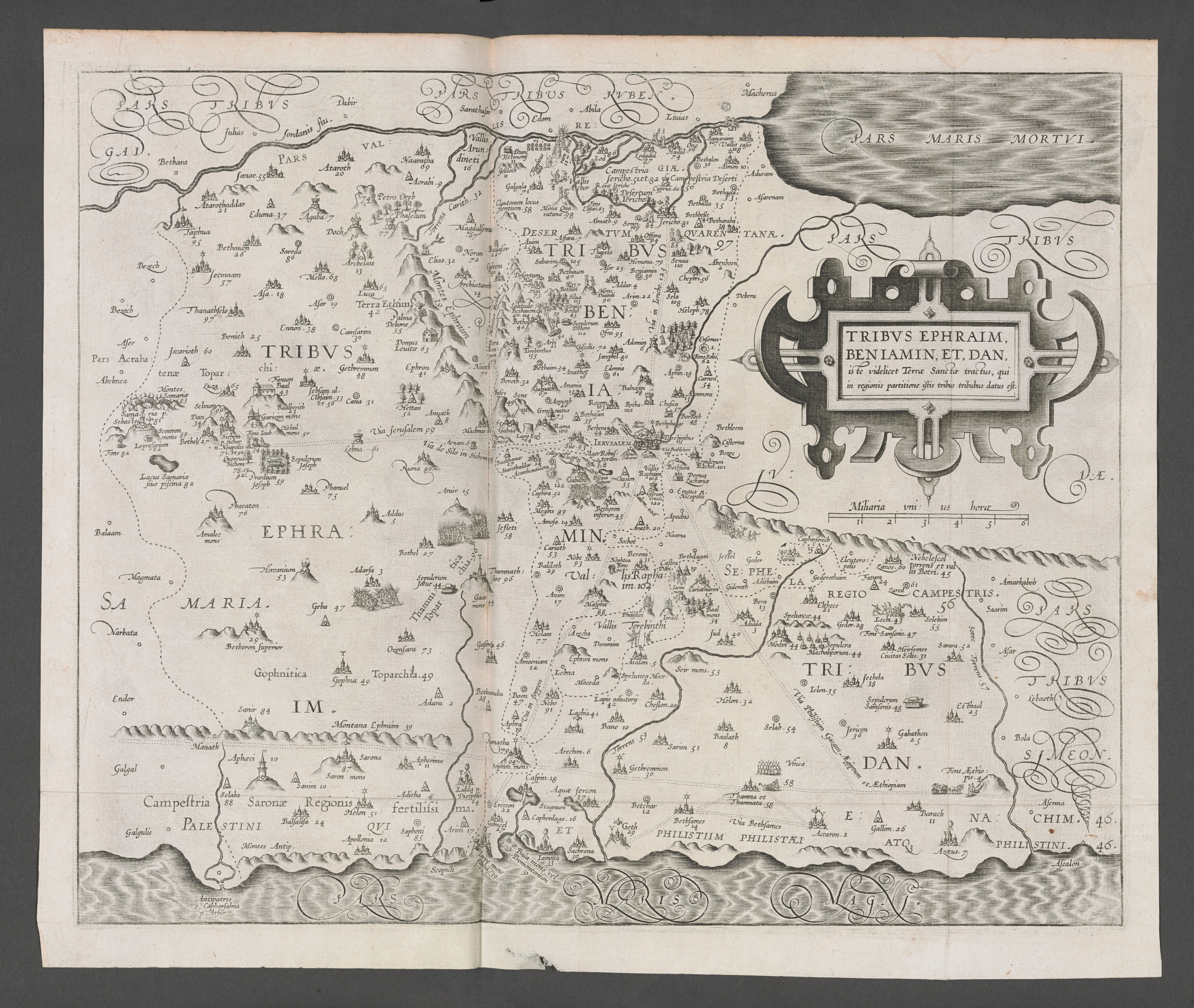

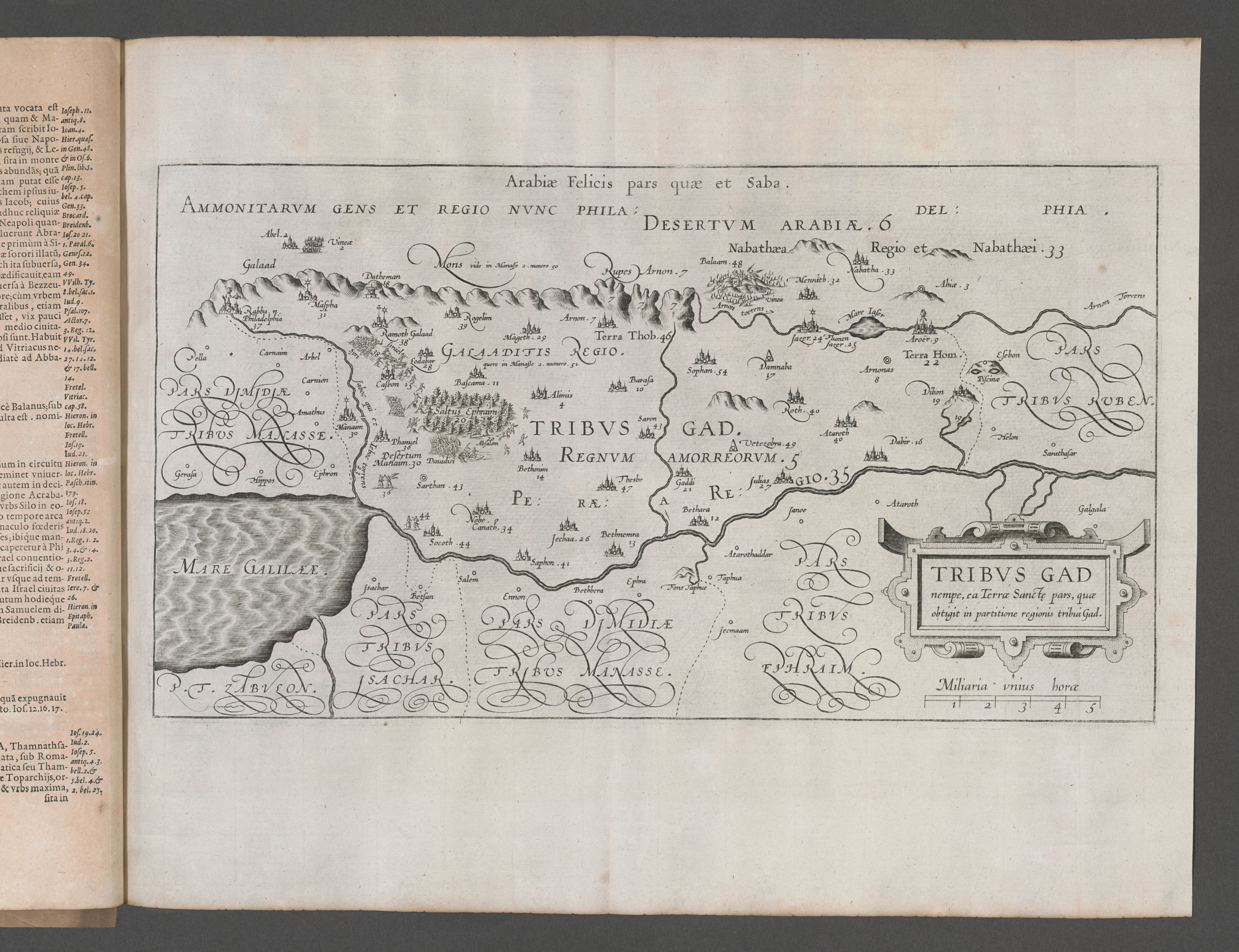

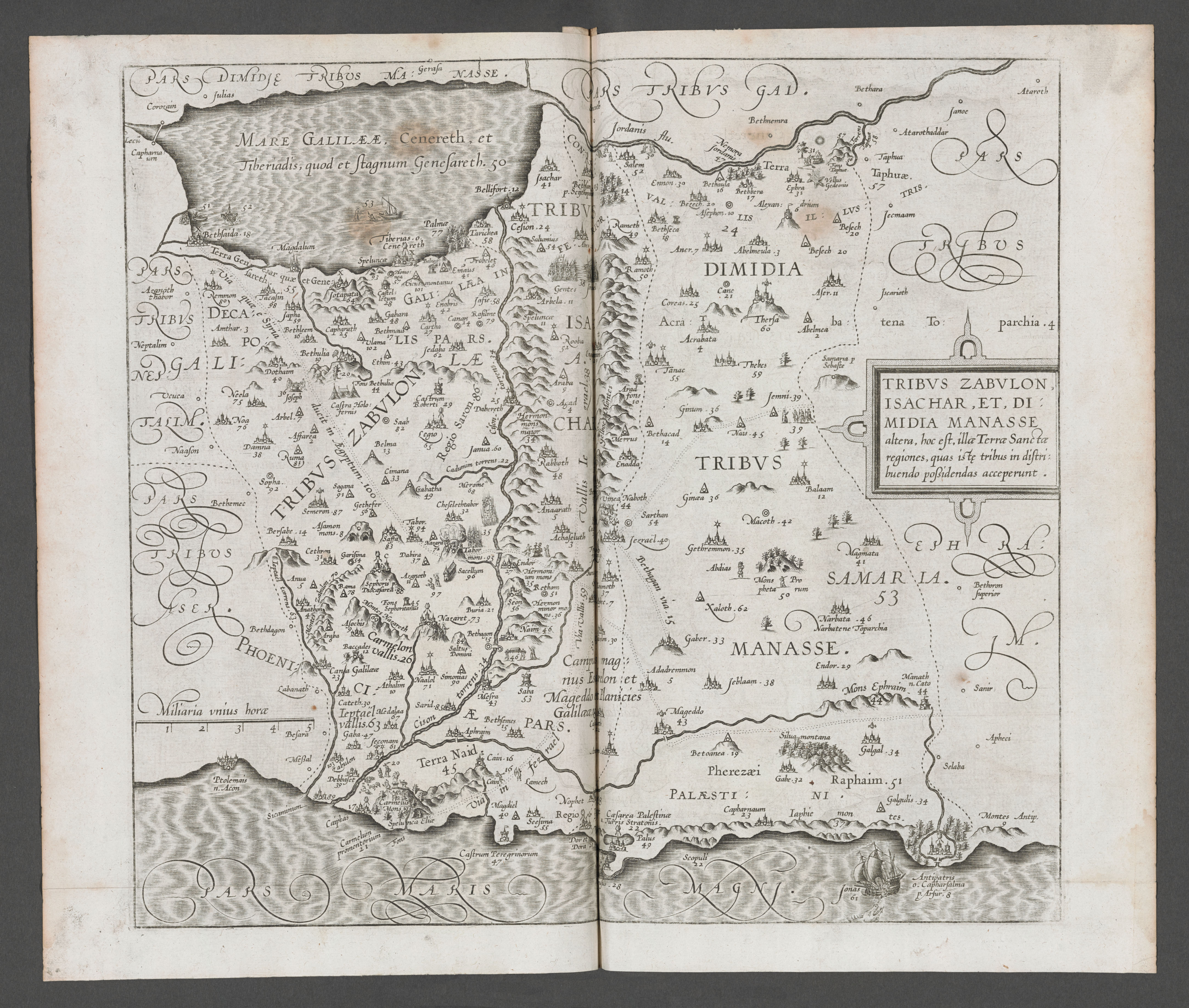

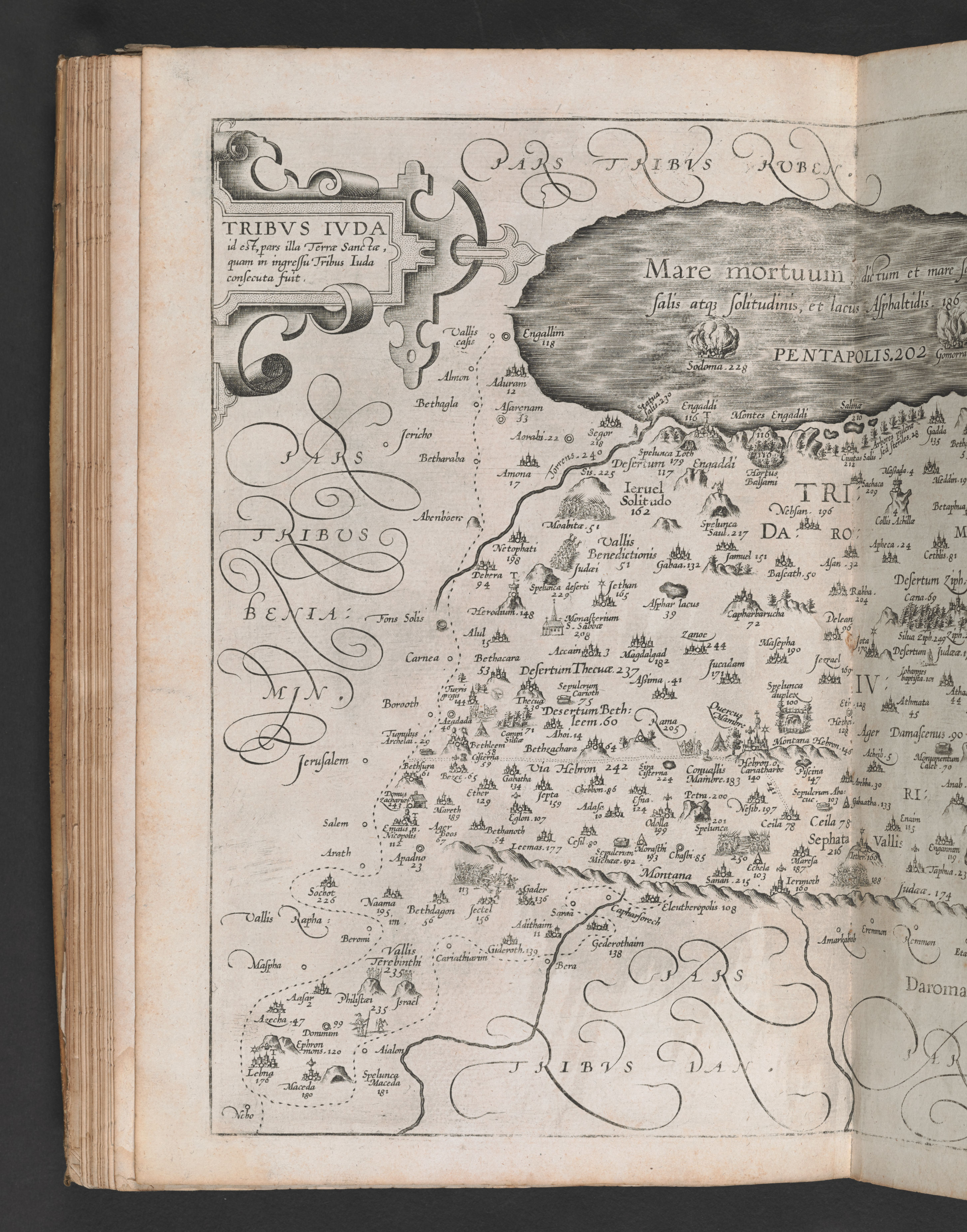

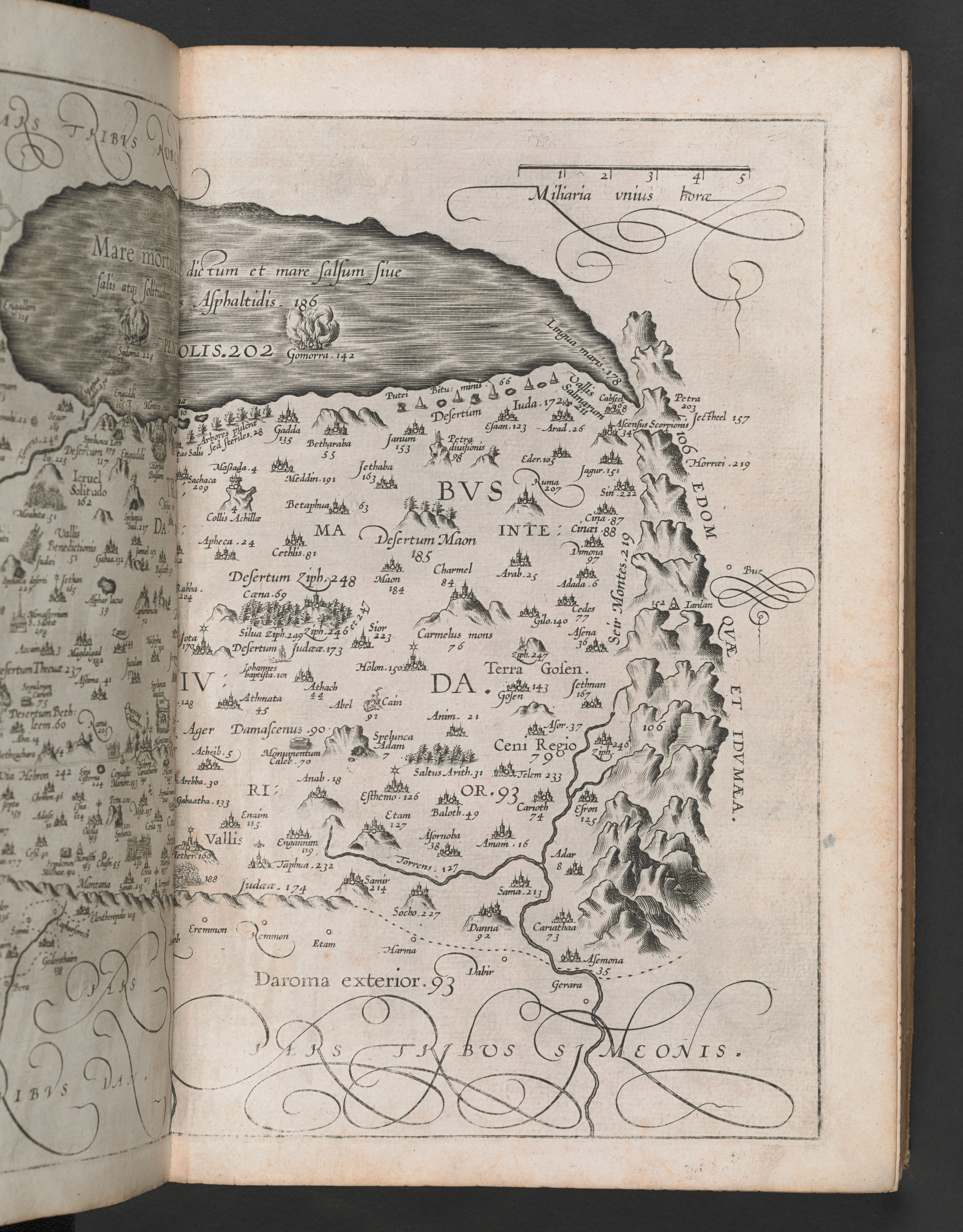

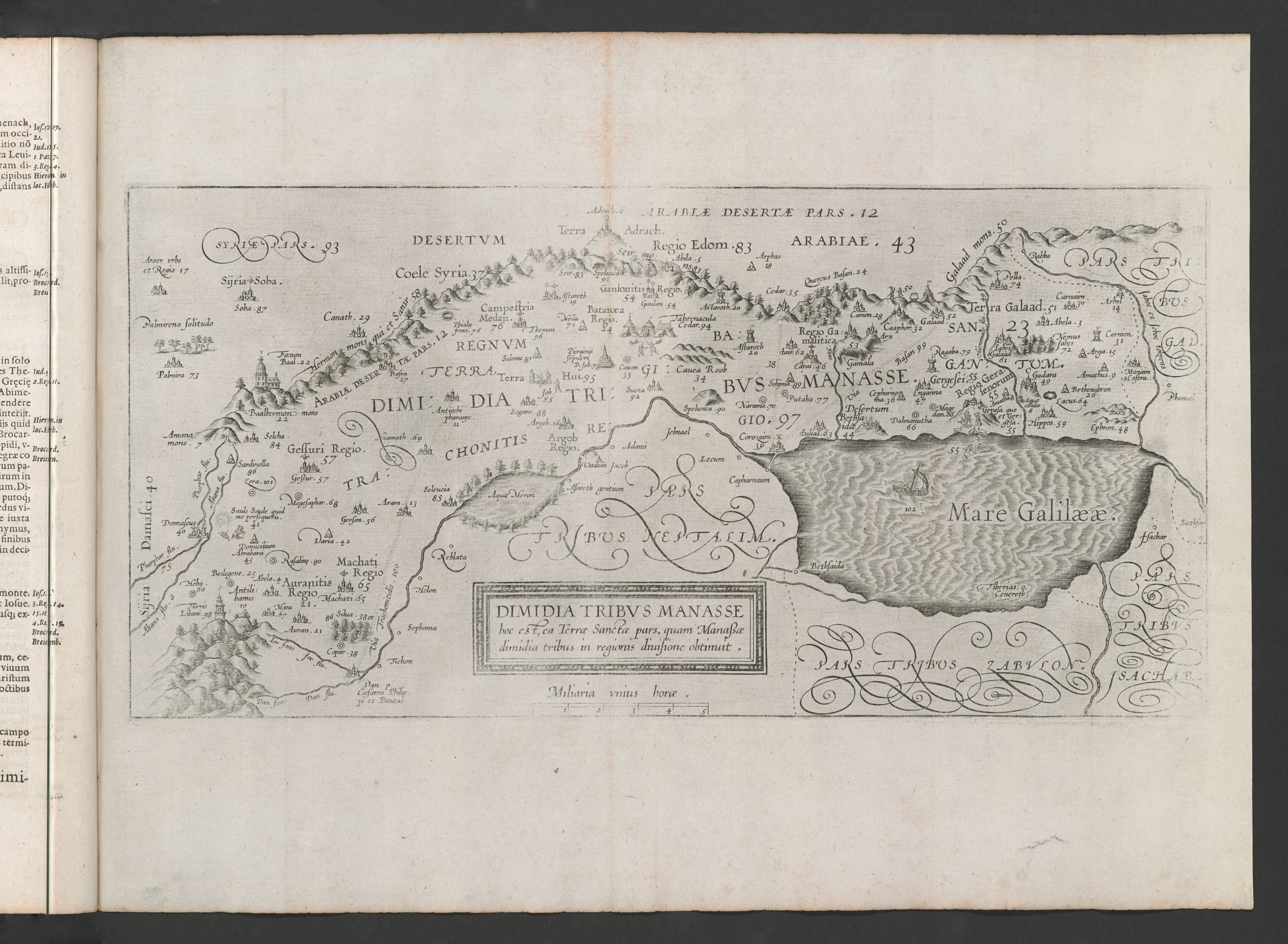

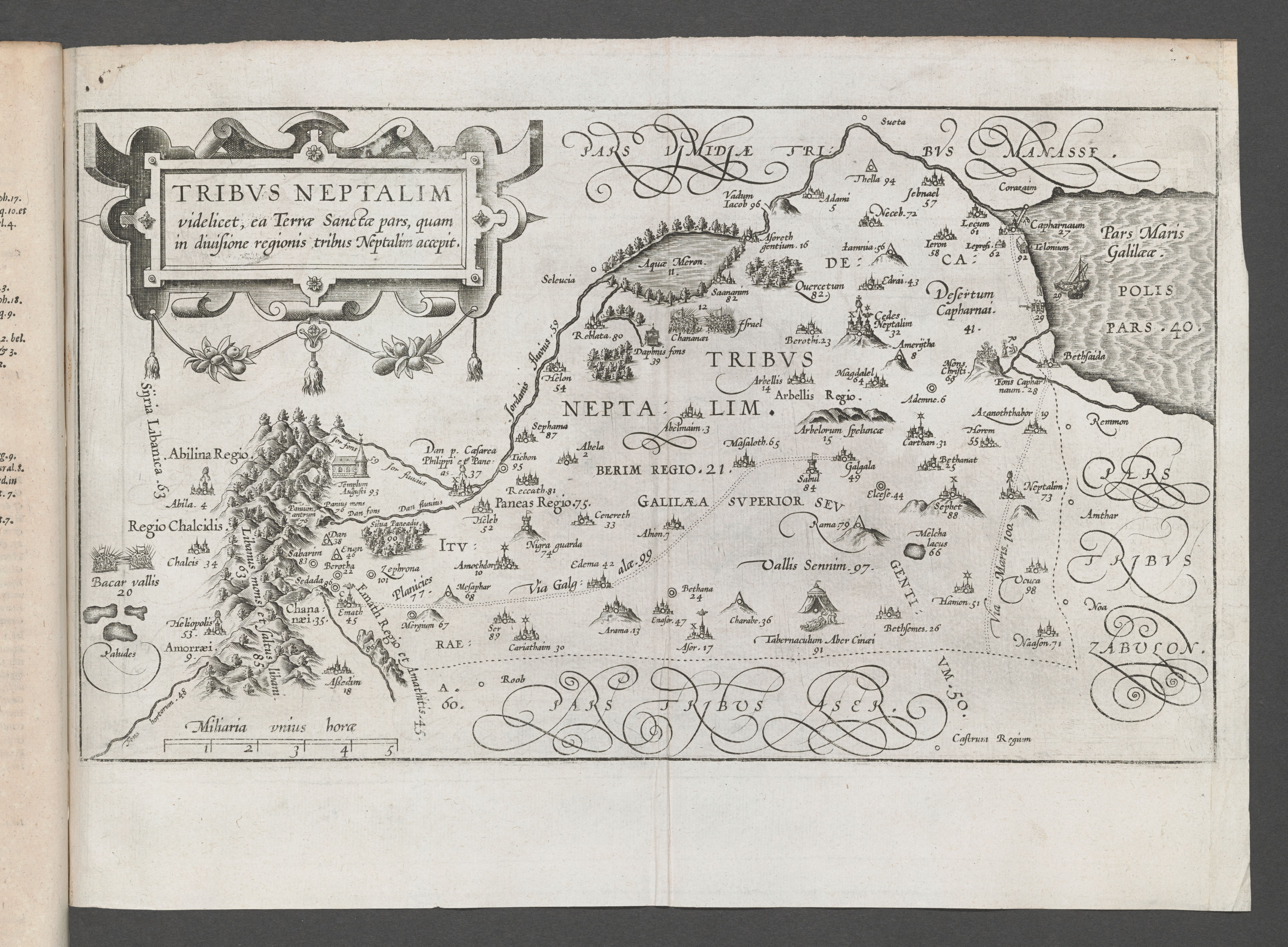

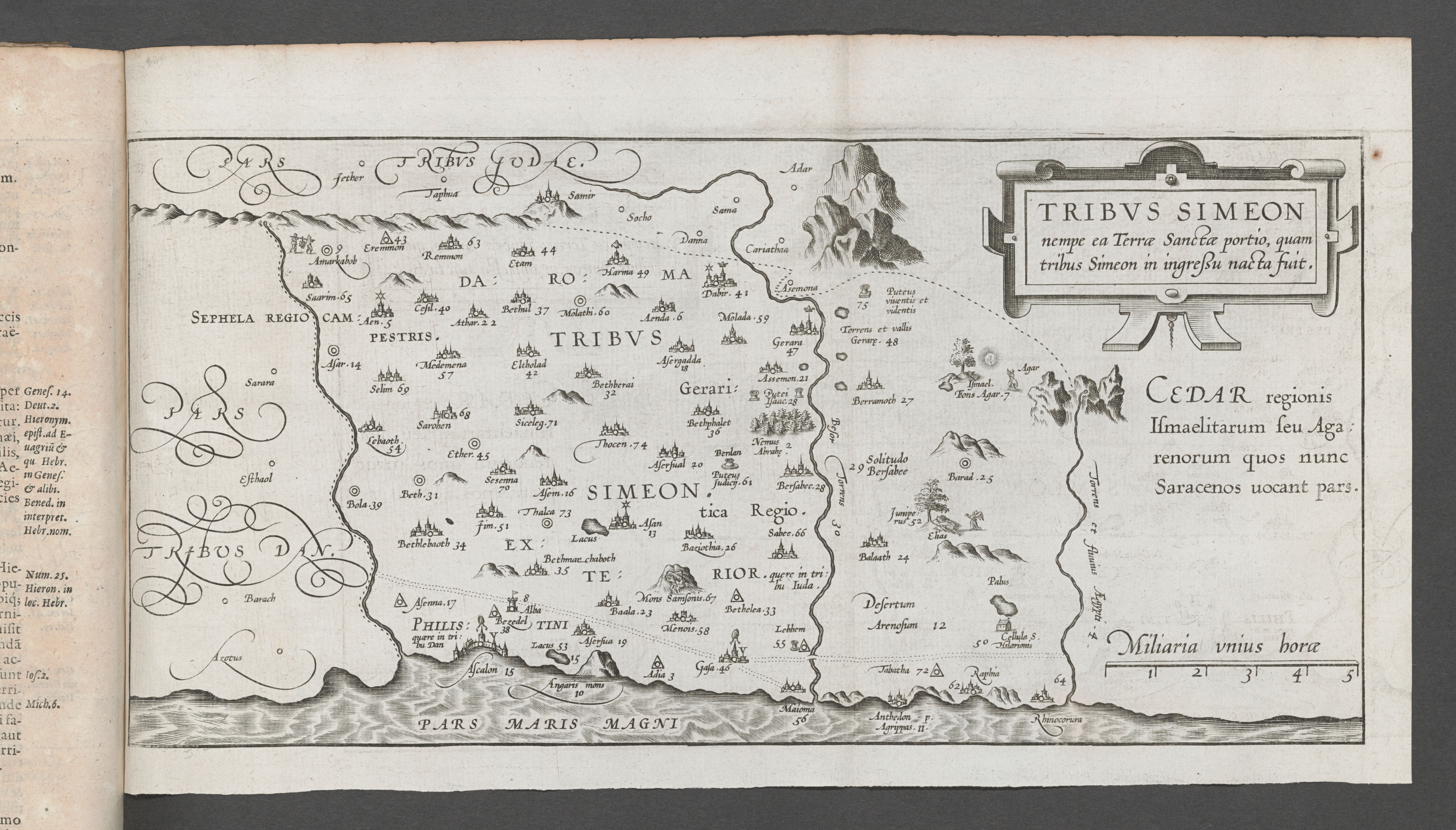

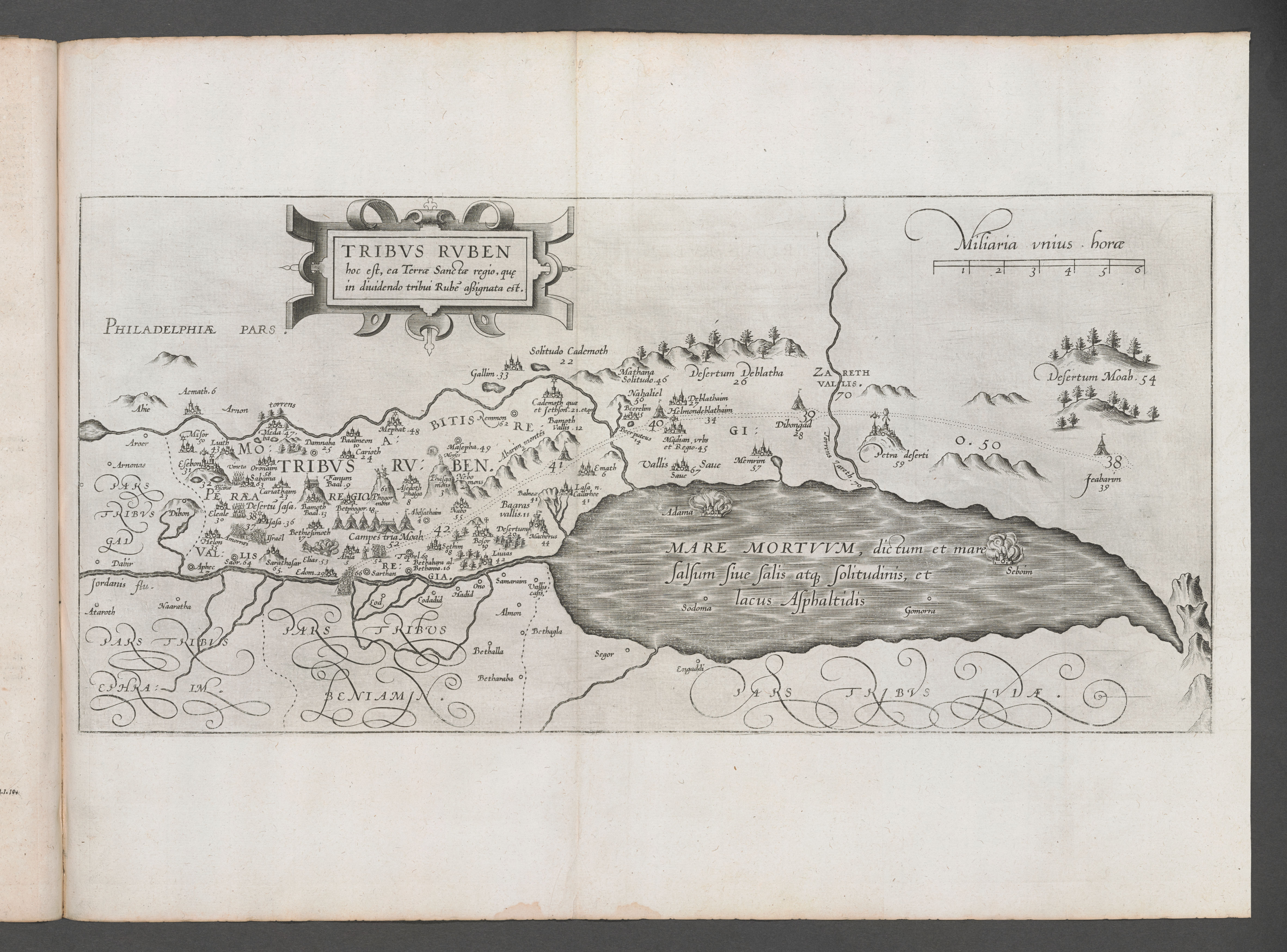

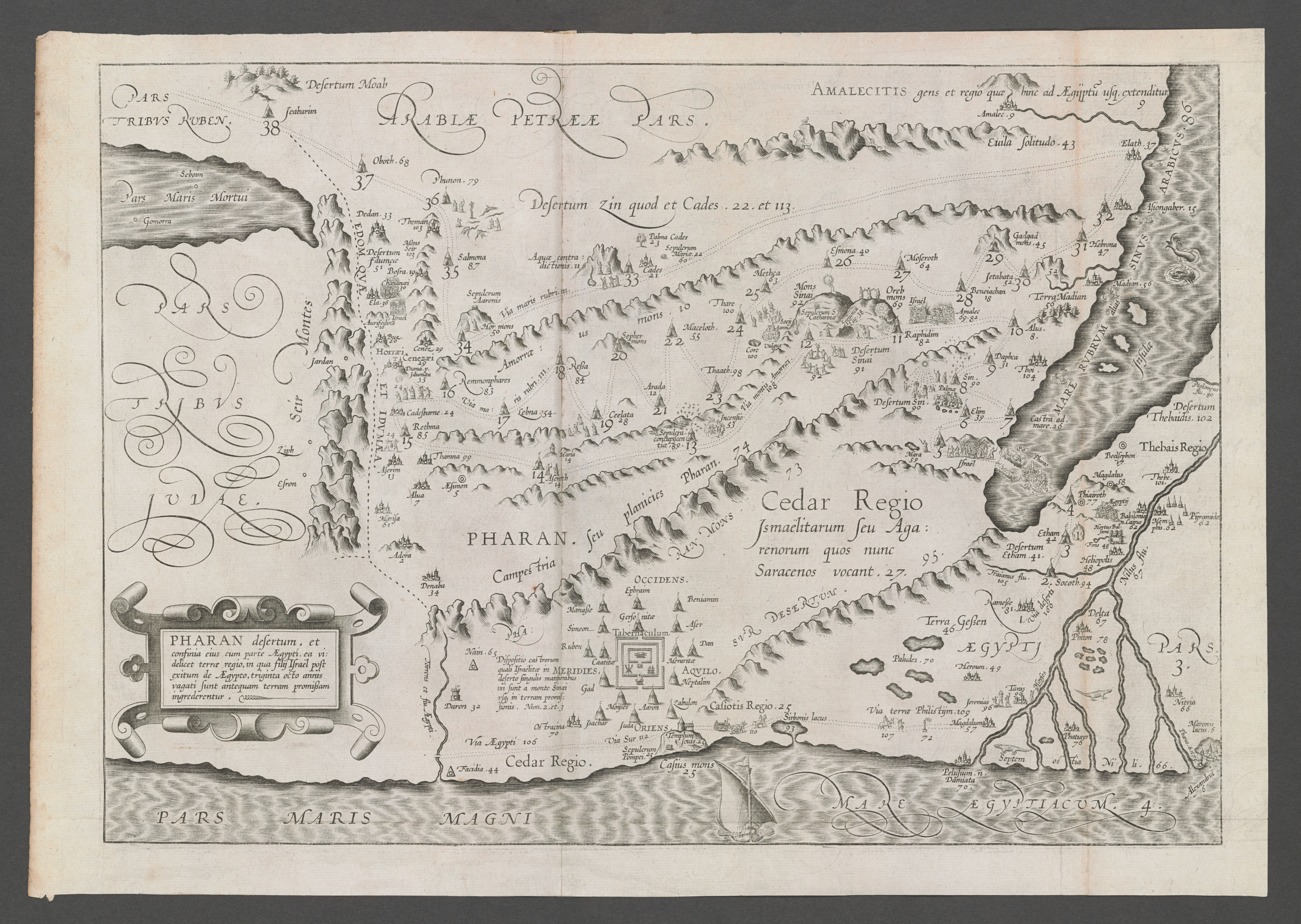
